= Timeline of progressive rock (2000–2009) =

This is a timeline of artists, albums, and events in progressive rock and its subgenres. This article contains the timeline for the period 2000–2009.

== Contents ==
2000 - 2001 - 2002 - 2003 - 2004 - 2005 - 2006 - 2007 - 2008 - 2009

- See also
- Further reading

== 2000 ==
=== Newly formed bands ===
- AraPacis
- Between The Buried And Me
- Daedalus
- Electric Light Orchestra (reformed line-up; only Jeff Lynne and Richard Tandy return from original line-up)
- Planet X
- The Orchestra (formed from remaining members of Electric Light Orchestra Part II, and not affiliated with Electric Light Orchestra listed above)
- Von Hertzen Brothers

=== Albums ===
Release date	Artist	Album	Country
6 March 2000	Ian Anderson	The Secret Language of Birds	England
21 March 2000	Transatlantic	SMPTe	Various
27 March 2000	Pink Floyd	Is There Anybody Out There? The Wall Live 1980-81	England
11 April 2000	Trans-Siberian Orchestra	Beethoven's Last Night	US
25 April 2000	Arena	Immortal?	England
1 May 2000	Glass Hammer	Chronometree	US
8 May 2000	Iona	Open Sky	England
9 May 2000	Roger Hodgson	Open the Door	England
22 May 2000	Porcupine Tree	Lightbulb Sun	England
23 May 2000	King Crimson	the construKction of light	England
6 June 2000	Planet X	Universe	US
20 June 2000	Ayreon	Universal Migrator Part 1: The Dream Sequencer	Netherlands
20 June 2000	Ayreon	Universal Migrator Part 2: Flight of the Migrator	Netherlands
4 July 2000	The Flower Kings	Space Revolver	Sweden
11 July 2000	Kansas	Somewhere to Elsewhere	US
22 August 2000	Spock's Beard	V	US
11 September 2000	RPWL	God Has Failed	Germany
20 September 2000	Dir En Grey	Macabre	Japan
3 October 2000	Enchant	Juggling 9 Or Dropping 10	US
10 October 2000	Symphony X	V-The New Mythology Suite	US
31 October 2000	Pain of Salvation	The Perfect Element	Sweden
2000 Oct	CMX	Dinosaurus Stereophonicus	Finland
14 November 2000	Geddy Lee	My Favourite Headache	Canada
2000 Nov	IQ	The Seventh House	England
12 December 2000	Tool	Salival	US
2000	Echolyn	Cowboy Poems Free	US
2000	Steve Howe	Homebrew 2	England
2000	IQ	Subterannea: The Concert	England
2000	Karnataka	The Storm	UK
2000	Little Tragedies	The Sun of Spirit	Russia
2000	Little Tragedies	Porcelain Pavilion	Russia
2000	Mastermind	Angels of the Apocalypse	US
2000	Species Being	Orgone Therapy	US
2000	Sylvan	Encounters	Germany
2000	Volapük	Polyglöt	France
2000	White Willow	Sacrament	Norway

=== Disbandments ===
- Electric Light Orchestra Part II

=== Events ===
- Billy Sherwood left and Igor Khoroshev was fired from Yes. This left Yes for the first time in its history without a full-time keyboardist.
- Little Tragedies grew from a three piece band to five.

== 2001 ==
=== Newly formed bands ===
- Beardfish
- EXIT project
- The Mars Volta
- Coheed & Cambria

=== Albums ===
Release date	Artist	Album	Country
12 February 2001	Saga	House of Cards	Canada
12 March 2001	Opeth	Blackwater Park	Sweden
22 March 2001	Koenji Hyakkei	Nivraym	Japan
27 March 2001	No-Man	Returning Jesus	England
3 April 2001	Amorphis	Am Universum	Finland
15 May 2001	Shadow Gallery	Legacy	US
15 May 2001	Marillion	Anoraknophobia	England
15 May 2001	Tool	Lateralus	US
30 May 2001	Dredg	Leitmotif	US
5 June 2001	Asia	Aura	England
12 June 2001	Electric Light Orchestra	Zoom	England
12 June 2001	Pendragon	Not of This World	England
18 June 2001	Muse	Origin of Symmetry	England
10 July 2001	Pallas	The Cross and the Crucible	Scotland
21 August 2001	Mastodon	Lifesblood	US
10 September 2001	Yes	Magnification	England
18 September 2001	The Flower Kings	The Rainmaker	Sweden
9 October 2001	Transatlantic	Bridge Across Forever	Various
30 October 2001	Sleepytime Gorilla Museum	Grand Opening and Closing	US
17 December 2001	Mostly Autumn	Music Inspired by The Lord of the Rings	England
2001	Ange	Culinaire Lingus	France
2001	Apocalypse	Apocalypse Live in USA	Brazil
2001	Ark	Burn the Sun	Norway
2001	Divinity Destroyed	Nocturnal Dawn	US
2001	Djam Karet	New Dark Age	US
2001	Glass	No Stranger to the Skies	US
2001	Halloween	Le Festin	France
2001	Hidria Spacefolk	HDRSF-01	Finland
2001	Steve Howe	Guitar Player	England
2001	Steve Howe	Guitar Plus	England
2001	Steve Howe	Natural Timbre	England
2001	Isildurs Bane	Mind Volume 2	Sweden
2001	La Torre dell'Alchimista	La torre dell'alchimista	Italy
2001	Le Orme	Elementi	Italy
2001	Los Jaivas	Arrebol	Chile
2001	Magma	Trilogie Theusz Hamtaahk	France
2001	maudlin of the Well	Bath	US
2001	maudlin of the Well	Leaving Your Body Map	US
2001	Miriodor	Mekano	Canada
2001	Mostly Autumn	The Last Bright Light	England
2001	Mastermind	Prog, Fusion, Metal, Leather & Sweat	US
2001	Olive Mess	Live Without Audience	Latvia
2001	One Shot	Vendredi 13	France
2001	Present	High Infidelity	Belgium
2001	The Orchestra	No Rewind	England
2001	Spaced Out	Eponymus II	Canada
2001	Thieves' Kitchen	Argot	England
2001	Von Hertzen Brothers	Experience	Finland

=== Disbandments ===
- Death
- Electric Light Orchestra

=== Events ===
- Dream Theater released Live Scenes from New York on September 11, 2001 which made headlines because the album's artwork had an image of the New York City skyline in flames, including a depiction of the World Trade Center. The terrorist attack on the World Trade Center occurred the same day. The album was recalled and a new version was released. The original artwork is now a rare collectible.
- Russian Prog Rock festival InProg took place for the first time.
- Chuck Schuldiner, the frontman of Death, died from brain cancer.

== 2002 ==
=== Newly formed bands ===
- Protest The Hero
- Mechanical Poet
- Pig Farm On The Moon
- Riverside
- a.P.A.t.T.

=== Albums ===
Release date	Artist	Album	Country
29 January 2002	Dream Theater	Six Degrees Of Inner Turbulence	US
30 January 2002	Dir En Grey	Kisō	Japan
February 2002	Pain of Salvation	Remedy Lane	Sweden
5 March 2002	Coheed & Cambria	The Second Stage Turbine Blade	US
5 March 2002	IZZ	I Move	US
2 April 2002	The Mars Volta	Tremulant	US
23 April 2002	Supertramp	Slow Motion	England
25 April 2002	Kaipa	Notes from the Past	Sweden
1 May 2002	Quidam	The Time Beneath The Sky	Poland
14 May 2002	Rush	Vapor Trails	Canada
28 May 2002	Mastodon	Remission	US
June 2002	Echolyn	Mei	US
2 July 2002	RPWL	Trying to Kiss the Sun	Germany
19 July 2002	Camel	A Nod and a Wink	England
23 July 2002	Enchant	Blink of an Eye	US
31 July 2002	Dir En Grey	Six Ugly	Japan
16 August 2002	Frank Zappa	FZ:OZ	US
27 August 2002	Spock's Beard	Snow	USA
27 August 2002	Thirty Seconds to Mars	30 Seconds to Mars	US
1 September 2002	Glass Hammer	Lex Rex	US
10 September 2002	Magellan	Hundred Year Flood	US
23 September 2002	Peter Gabriel	Up	England
24 September 2002	Porcupine Tree	In Absentia	England
7 October 2002	Karmakanic	Entering The Spectra	Sweden
8 October 2002	Dredg	El Cielo	US
28 October 2002	Sigur Rós	( )	Iceland
October 2002	Sylvan	Artificial Paradise	Germany
5 November 2002	The Flower Kings	Unfold the Future	Sweden
12 November 2002	Opeth	Deliverance	Sweden
2002	Dave Kerman/5uu's	Abandonship	US
2002	Bubblemath	Such Fine Particles of the Universe	US
2002	Big Big Train	Bard	England
2002	Deus Ex Machina	Cinque	Italy
2002	Everon	Bridge	Germany
2002	Everon	Flesh	Germany
2002	EXIT project	Live Electricity	Russia
2002	Farpoint	First Light	US
2002	Hidria Spacefolk	Symbiosis	Finland
2002	Höstsonaten	Springsong	Italy
2002	Steve Howe	Skyline	England
2002	Inviolet Row	Consolation Prizes	US
2002	Kenso	Fabulis Mirabilibus De Bombycosi Scriptis	Japan
2002	Tony Levin	Pieces of the Sun	US
2002	Mats / Morgan	On Air With Guests	Sweden
2002	NeBeLNeST	Nova Express	France
2002	Olive Mess	Gramercy	Latvia
2002	Le Orme	L'infinito	Italy
2002	Paatos	Timeloss	Sweden
2002	Planet X	MoonBabies	US
2002	Pig Farm On The Moon	Orbital	Venezuela
2002	Sotos	Platypus	France
2002	Sphere3	Comeuppance	UK
2002	Témpano	The Agony and the Ecstasy	Venezuela
2002	Uzva	Niittoaika	Finland
c.2002	Citizen Cain	Playing Dead	UK

=== Disbandments ===
- Transatlantic - Neal Morse announced his departure from "mainstream music". Transatlantic would reform with the same line-up in 2009.
- After the "One More for the Road" tour, Supertramp goes on hiatus once again.

=== Events ===
- Rick Wakeman re-joined Yes.
- Having grown in popularity since its inception in 1999, NEARfest relocated to Trenton, New Jersey for the next two years to a venue that seats 1,850.
- Neal Morse, the frontman and primary contributor for Spock's Beard, embraced Christianity and left the band. He would later pursue a solo career producing progressive rock albums as well as occasional folk and worship albums. Spock's Beard continued on with drummer Nick D'Virgilio taking on lead vocal/frontman duties.
- First Progman Cometh Music Festival in Seattle
- Rush released Vapor Trails, their first album since 1996's Test For Echo. The band had been on hiatus after the death of drummer Neil Peart's daughter in 1997, and wife in 1998.
- Former Camel keyboardist Peter Bardens died.
- Drummer Chris Maitland left Porcupine Tree.

== 2003 ==
=== Newly formed bands ===
- Pure Reason Revolution
- Black Bonzo
- Moon Safari
- OSI
- AraPacis

=== Albums ===
Release date	Artist	Album	Country
27 January 2003	Arena	Contagion	England
4 February 2003	Frank Zappa	Halloween	US
10 February 2003	Karnataka	Delicate Flame of Desire	UK
17 February 2003	OSI	Office of Strategic Influence	US
4 March 2003	King Crimson	The Power to Believe	England
8 April 2003	Saga	Marathon	Canada
22 April 2003	Opeth	Damnation	Sweden
26 May 2003	Amorphis	Far from the Sun	Finland
24 June 2003	The Mars Volta	De-Loused In The Comatorium	US
2003 Jun	Anekdoten	Gravity	Sweden
8 July 2003	Spock's Beard	Feel Euphoria	US
5 August 2003	Enchant	Tug of War	US
19 August 2003	Ian Anderson	Rupi's Dance	England
2 September 2003	Kaipa	Keyholder	Sweden
2 September 2003	No-Man	Together We're Stranger	England
8 September 2003	Iron Maiden	Dance of Death	England
10 September 2003	Dir En Grey	Vulgar	Japan
21 September 2003	Muse	Absolution	England
21 September 2003	Riverside	Out of Myself	Poland
23 September 2003	Neal Morse	Testimony	US
29 September 2003	Oceansize	Effloresce	England
30 September 2003	Jethro Tull	The Jethro Tull Christmas Album	England
7 October 2003	Coheed & Cambria	In Keeping Secrets of Silent Earth: 3	US
7 October 2003	The Tangent	The Music That Died Alone	Various
11 November 2003	Dream Theater	Train Of Thought	US
2003 Oct	Daedalus	Leading Far From a Mistake	Italy
2003	After Crying	Show	Hungary
2003	Apocalypse	Refúgio	Brazil
2003	Azigza	Kriya	US
2003	Beardfish	Från en plats du ej kan se...	Sweden
2003	Cast	Al-Bandaluz	Mexico
2003	Divinity Destroyed	Divinity Destroyed	
2003	Divinity Destroyed	Eden in Ashes	US
2003	Djam Karet	A Night For Baku	US
2003	Farpoint	Grace	US
2003	Frogg Café	Creatures	US
2003	Kostarev Group	Live@InProg 2003	Russia
2003	Knight Area	The Sun Also Rises	Netherlands
2003	Krakatoa	We Are the Rowboats	US
2003	Little Tragedies	New Faust	Russia
2003	Magellan	Impossible Figures	US
2003	Mechanical Poet	Handmade Essence	Russia
2003	Mostly Autumn	Passengers	England
2003	Pineapple Thief	Variations on a Dream	England
2003	Satellite	A Street Between Sunrise And Sunset	Poland
2003	Steve Howe	Masterpiece Guitars	England
2003	Steve Howe	Elements	England
2003	Steve Howe	Light Walls	England
2003	Steve Howe	Guitar World	England
2003	Taal	Skymind	France
2003	The Science Group	Spoors	Various
2003	Thinking Plague	A History of Madness	US
2003	Ten Jinn	Alone	US

=== Disbandments ===
- Ark

=== Events ===
- InProg takes place for the second time.
- The Mars Volta forms out of the punk group At the Drive-In and releases their first full studio album De-Loused in the Comatorium. The album mixes elements of prog, post-rock, punk, Latin, and jazz. The release is very successful and becomes an example of progressive rock success in the mainstream.
- Second Progman Cometh Music Festival in Seattle
- Robert Fripp and King Crimson release The Power to Believe, their first studio album since 2000.
- The Tangent is formed and releases their first album The Music That Died Alone. The initial lineup of this "supergroup" consisted of Andy Tillison & Sam Baine (Parallel Or 90 Degrees), Roine Stolt, Jonas Reingold, & Zoltan Czsorz (The Flower Kings), David Jackson (Van der Graaf Generator), and Guy Manning (Manning). It featured the epic track The Canterbury Sequence, which was an homage to the Canterbury scene of the 1970s.
- Los Jaivas Frontman/Guitarist/Vocalist Eduardo "Gato" Alquinta, Died of a Heart Attack.

== 2004 ==
=== Newly formed bands ===
- FromUz (Uzbekistan)
- Janvs (Italy)
- Karmic Juggernaut (U.S.A.)
- Sanctuary Rig (England)
- Tinyfish (England)

=== Reformed bands ===
- Van Der Graaf Generator

=== Albums ===
Release date	Artist	Album	Country
6 January 2004	Disen Gage	The Screw-Loose Entertainment	Russia
14 January 2004	Glass Hammer	Shadowlands	US
2004 Feb	Blackfield	Blackfield	Various
2004 Feb	Porcupine Tree	Warszawa	England
5 April 2004	Proto-Kaw	Before Became After	US
27 April 2004	Eric Burdon	My Secret Life	England
27 April 2004	Marillion	Marbles	England
25 May 2004	Ayreon	The Human Equation	Netherlands
30 May 2004	Frank Zappa	Joe's Corsage	US
29 June 2004	IQ	Dark Matter	England
26 July 2004	Dave Bainbridge	Veil of Gossamer	England
3 August 2004	The Flower Kings	Adam & Eve	Sweden
31 August 2004	Asia	Silent Nation	England
31 August 2004	Mastodon	Leviathan	US
14 September 2004	Frank Zappa	QuAUDIOPHILIAc	US
27 September 2004	Pain of Salvation	Be	Sweden
1 October 2004	Frank Zappa	Joe's Domage	US
12 October 2004	The Tangent	The World That We Drive Through	Various
25 October 2004	Sleepytime Gorilla Museum	Of Natural History	US
26 October 2004	3	Wake Pig	US
2 November 2004	Neal Morse	One	US
15 November 2004	Eyefear	9 Elements of Inner Vision	Australia
30 November 2004	Saga	Network	Canada
2004	Ahvak	Ahvak	Israel
2004	Amarok	Quentadharkën	Spain
2004	Apocalypse	Magic-Radio Edits	Brazil
2004	Big Big Train	Gathering Speed	England
2004	Black Bonzo	Lady of the Light	Sweden
2004	EXIT project	Quintet	Russia
2004	Farpoint	From Dreaming to Dreaming	US
2004	Finisterre	Le Meccanica Naturale	Italy
2004	Glass	No Stranger to the Skies	France
2004	Guapo	Five Suns	England
2004	Happy the Man	The Muse Awakens	US
2004	Hidria Spacefolk	Balansia	Finland
2004	Karmakanic	Wheel of Life	Sweden
2004	Le Orme	L'Infinito	Italy
2004	Magenta	Seven	England
2004	Magma	K.A. (Kohntarkosz Anteria)	France
2004	Mechanical Poet	Woodland Prattlers	Russia
2004	Metamorfosi	Paradiso	Italy
2004	Mizraab	Mazi Haal Mustaqbil	Pakistan
2004	Myriad	Natural Elements	US
2004	Ozric Tentacles	Spirals in Hyperspace	England
2004	Panzerpappa	Farlig Vandring	Norway
2004	Sylvan	X-Rayed	Germany
2004	The Watch	Vacuum	Italy
2004	White Willow	Storm Season	Norway

=== Events ===
- Anton Kochurkin and Michail "Kotovsky" Finagin leave EXIT Project.
- InProg 2004.
- Mel Pritchard, original drummer with Barclay James Harvest, dies of a heart attack.
- French 70s Zeuhl pioneers Magma release K.A (Köhntarkösz Anteria), a long anticipated follow-up album containing material written in the 1970s.
- Happy the Man, a popular 70s American group who had reunited a few years earlier, release their first recorded studio album in 25 years titled The Muse Awakens.
- Rush celebrated their 30th anniversary, along with releasing an 8-track cover EP titled Feedback.
- Yuri Alaverdyan, the guitarist of Disen Gage, leaves the band and is replaced by Sergey Bagin.
- Former members Derek Sherinian and Charlie Dominici join Dream Theater on stage to commemorate the 15th anniversary of "When Dream and Day Unite"

== 2005 ==
=== Newly formed bands ===
- Deluge Grander (U.S.A.)
- Dominici (U.S.A.)
- Outlaws of Ravenhurst (Canada)
- Qelbanix - Albania
- We Are The Music Makers (U.S.A.)
- Solarys (Lisbon, Portugal), http://solarys.pt.vu, formerly Project W.I.L.L. (1999–2004)

=== Albums ===
Release date	Artist	Album	Country
17 January 2005	Arena	Pepper's Ghost	England
24 January 2005	RPWL	World Through My Eyes	Germany
25 January 2005	Spock's Beard	Octane	US
7 February 2005	Karnivool	Themata	Australia
15 February 2005	The Sound of Animals Fighting	Tiger and the Duke	US
22 February 2005	Kino	Picture	England
1 March 2005	The Mars Volta	Frances The Mute	US
9 March 2005	Dir En Grey	Withering to Death	Japan
28 March 2005	Porcupine Tree	Deadwing	England
12 April 2005	Cog	The New Normal	Australia
18 April 2005	Magellan	Symphony for a Misanthrope	US
19 April 2005	Circa Survive	Juturna	US
25 April 2005	Van der Graaf Generator	Present	England
30 May 2005	Kaipa	Mindrevolutions	Sweden
6 June 2005	Quidam	surREvival	Poland
7 June 2005	Dream Theater	Octavarium	US
5 July 2005	Dominici	O3: A Trilogy, Part One	US
12 July 2005	Glass Hammer	The Inconsolable Secret	US
16 August 2005	The Fall of Troy	Doppelganger	US
20 August 2005	Koenji Hyakkei	Angherr Shisspa	Japan
29 August 2005	Opeth	Ghost Reveries	Sweden
30 August 2005	Protest The Hero	Kezia	Canada
30 August 2005	Thirty Seconds to Mars	A Beautiful Lie	US
2005 Aug	Echolyn	The End Is Beautiful	US
6 September 2005	Between The Buried And Me	Alaska	US
12 September 2005	Sigur Rós	Takk...	Iceland
19 September 2005	Oceansize	Everyone Into Position	England
20 September 2005	Coheed & Cambria	Good Apollo, I'm Burning Star IV, Volume One: From Fear Through the Eyes of Madness	US
20 September 2005	Indukti	S.U.S.A.R.	Poland
27 September 2005	KTU	8 Armed Monkey	Various
2005 Sep	Wobbler	Hinterland	Norway
1 October 2005	Moon Safari	A Doorway to Summer	Sweden
1 November 2005	Neal Morse	?	US
8 November 2005	The Mars Volta	Scabdates	US
8 November 2005	Riverside	Second Life Syndrome	Poland
11 November 2005	Roine Stolt	Wallstreet Voodoo	Sweden
21 December 2005	Frank Zappa	Joe's Xmasage	US
2005	Ange	Point D'interrogation	France
2005	Beardfish	The Sane Day	Sweden
2005	Cerebus Effect	Acts of Deception	US
2005	Divinity Destroyed	Eden in Ashes	US
2005	Divinity Destroyed	The Plague	US
2005	Djam Karet	Recollection Harvest	US
2005	EXIT project	Hack The World	Russia
2005	Frogg Café	Fortunate Observer of Time	US
2005	The Future Kings of England	The Future Kings of England	UK
2005	Glass	Illuminations	US
2005	Guapo	Black Oni	England
2005	John Hackett	Checking Out Of London	England
2005	IZZ	My River Flows	US
2005	K2	Book of the Dead	England
2005	Little Tragedies	Return	Russia
2005	Machine and the Synergetic Nuts	Leap Second Neutral	Japan
2005	Miasma & The Carousel of Headless Horses	Perils	England
2005	Miriodor	Parade + Live at NEARfest 2002	Canada
2005	Mostly Autumn	Storms Over Still Water	England
2005	Nil	Nil Novo Sub Sole	France
2005	Nurkostam	XIII	Finland
2005	Mastermind	Broken	US
2005	Pallas	The Dreams Of Men	Scotland
2005	Pendragon	Believe	England
2005	Robert Beriau	Falling Back To Where I Began	Canada
2005	Sanctuary Rig	Sail On	England
2005	Satellite	Evening Games	Poland
2005	Underground Railroad	The Origin of Consciousnes	US
2005	Unitopia	More Than a Dream	Australia

=== Events ===
- 1970s progressive rock legends Van der Graaf Generator reunite and release a double CD titled Present which contained strong lyrical content and an entire disc of improvisations.
- InProg turned into a two-day international festival.
- Kino, a new progressive rock supergroup consisting of members from Porcupine Tree, Arena, Marillion, and It Bites is formed. They release their first album, Picture in 2005.
- Pink Floyd members David Gilmour, Nick Mason, and Richard Wright reunite with Roger Waters, the leading creative force of the band during its 1970s heyday, at Live 8 on July 2 in Hyde Park, England. Waters had acrimoniously left the band in 1985, and the quartet had last played together during a performance of The Wall in 1981.
- Former Gong drummer Pierre Moerlen died.
- Yugoslav band Na Lepem Prijazni reunites after 24 years.

== 2006 ==
=== Newly formed bands ===
- American Flag (US)
- Birds and Buildings (US)
- GPS
- Grand Tour (Scotland)
- Mother Military
- Pomme De Chien
- Proyecto Eskhata (Spain)
- Ride the Sky
- Thought Chamber
- Ved Buens Ende (reformed with previous line-up)

=== Albums ===
Release date	Artist	Album	Country
13 January 2006	Frank Zappa	Imaginary Diseases	US
31 January 2006	Proto-Kaw	The Wait of Glory	US
31 January 2006	The Tangent	A Place in the Queue	Various
15 February 2006	Amorphis	Eclipse	Finland
6 March 2006	David Gilmour	On An Island	England
27 March 2006	Lizard	Spam	Poland
2006 Mar	Queensrÿche	Operation: Mindcrime II	US
4 April 2006	The Flower Kings	Paradox Hotel	Sweden
10 April 2006	Pure Reason Revolution	The Dark Third	England
21 April 2006	OSI	Free	US
2 May 2006	Tool	10,000 Days	US
17 May 2006	Von Hertzen Brothers	Approach	Finland
23 May 2006	Saga	Trust	Canada
13 June 2006	Between The Buried And Me	The Anatomy Of	US
11 July 2006	Muse	Black Holes and Revelations	England
25 Aug 2006	Iron Maiden	A Matter of Life and Death	United Kingdom
1 September 2006	Disen Gage	Libertage	Russia
11 September 2006	Mastodon	Blood Mountain	US
11 September 2006	To-Mera	Transcendental	United Kingdom
12 September 2006	The Mars Volta	Amputechture	US
26 September 2006	The Dear Hunter	Act I: The Lake South, the River North	US
2 October 2006	Iona	The Circling Hour	England
3 October 2006	The Decemberists	The Crane Wife	US
24 October 2006	Frank Zappa	Trance-Fusion	US
21 November 2006	Spock's Beard	Spock's Beard	US
5 December 2006	Frank Zappa	The MOFO Project/Object	US
15 December 2006	Frank Zappa	The Frank Zappa AAAFNRAA Birthday Bundle (2006)	US
19 December 2006	Tinyfish	Tinyfish Album	England
2006	A Triggering Myth	The Remedy of Abstraction	US
2006	Kostarev	Works 1978-2006	Russia
2006	Deluge Grander	August in the Urals	US
2006	Little Tragedies	The Six Sense	Russia
2006	Mostly Autumn	Heart Full Of Sky	England
2006	Pomme De Chien	The Death Of Logan	Canada
2006	Quidam	...bez półPRĄDU...halfPLUGGED...	Poland
2006	Sylvan	Posthumous Silence	Germany
2006	Sympozion	Kundabuffer	Israel
2006	The Sound of Animals Fighting	Lover, The Lord Has Left Us...	US
2006	Univers Zero	Live	Belgium
2006	Unjust	Glow	US
2006	Zaar	Zaar	France
2006	AraPacis	So Many Leapers	Canada

=== Events ===
- A combination of high-speed internet connections, MP3 compression, inexpensive streaming web servers, and the iPod/iTunes phenomenon has resulted in an explosion of internet radio stations devoted to playing progressive rock and other similar music. Some of these stations and radio programs have begun podcasting their programming, making it even more convenient to access music online.
- Former Soft Machine member Elton Dean died.
- Former Pink Floyd member Syd Barrett died on July 7 due to diabetic related complications.
- Former Hatfield and the North/National Health drummer Pip Pyle died in August.
- Josh Eppard and Michael Todd, the drummer and bassist respectively for Coheed & Cambria left the group for personal reasons. Eppard was replaced with Chris Pennie of The Dillinger Escape Plan fame, but Michael Todd returned to help finish recording their next album.
- Genesis announced plans to reunite for a reunion tour in 2007 with Phil Collins, Tony Banks and Mike Rutherford being augmented by Daryl Stuermer and Chester Thompson. Members Peter Gabriel and Steve Hackett would not take part.

== 2007 ==
=== Newly formed bands ===
- Animist
- Beggar's Loot
- Circa (formed 2006, announced March 2007)
- Dennis
- Distant Lights
- Fractal Dimension - Turkey (İstanbul)
- Haken - England
- Headspace
- Porn Sheep Hospital - Portugal
- Skyshroud Claim
- White Nurse Gene

=== Albums ===
Release date	Artist	Album	Country
22 January 2007	Pain of Salvation	Scarsick	Sweden
23 January 2007	Damiera	M(US)IC	US
7 February 2007	Dir En Grey	The Marrow of a Bone	Japan
13 February 2007	Blackfield	Blackfield II	multi-international
20 February 2007	Psyopus	Our Puzzling Encounters Considered	US
26 February 2007	Dominici	O3: A Trilogy, Part Two	US
2007 Feb	Gazpacho	Night	Norway
18 March 2007	Distant Lights	Simulacrum	US
1 April 2007	Frank Zappa	Buffalo	US
9 April 2007	Marillion	Somewhere Else	UK
16 April 2007	Porcupine Tree	Fear of a Blank Planet	UK
2007 Apr	Anekdoten	A Time Of Day	Sweden
1 May 2007	Rush	Snakes & Arrows	Canada
1 May 2007	The Fall of Troy	Manipulator	US
15 May 2007	Mystery	Beneath the Veil of Winter's Face	Canada
18 May 2007	Kaipa	Angling Feelings	Sweden
18 May 2007	Planet X	Quantum	US
21 May 2007	Beardfish	Sleeping in Traffic: Part One	Sweden
22 May 2007	The Dear Hunter	Act II: The Meaning of, and All Things Regarding Ms. Leading	US
25 May 2007	Sonata Arctica	Unia	Finland
29 May 2007	Circa Survive	On Letting Go	US
5 June 2007	Dream Theater	Systematic Chaos	US
24 July 2007	3	The End is Begun	US
9 August 2007	Headspace	I Am (EP)	England
24 August 2007	Frank Zappa	The Dub Room Special	US
29 August 2007	Amorphis	Silent Waters	Finland
30 August 2007	Big Big Train	The Difference Machine	England
5 September 2007	CMX	Talvikuningas	Finland
18 September 2007	Between the Buried and Me	Colors	US
24 September 2007	Riverside	Rapid Eye Movement	Poland
25 September 2007	The Flower Kings	The Sum of No Evil	Sweden
1 October 2007	Oceansize	Frames	England
23 October 2007	Coheed & Cambria	Good Apollo, I'm Burning Star IV, Volume Two: No World for Tomorrow	US
23 October 2007	Glass Hammer	Culture of Ascent	US
30 October 2007	Frank Zappa	Wazoo	US
5 November 2007	Quidam	Alone Together	Poland
6 November 2007	Saga	10,000 Days	Canada
13 November 2007	Din Within	Awaken the Man	US
20 November 2007	Genesis	Live Over Europe 2007	UK
2007	Ange	Souffleurs De Vers	France
2007	Apocalypse	Apocalypse Live in Rio	Brazil
2007	Black Bonzo	Sound of the Apocalypse	Sweden
2007	Eyefear	A World Full of Grey	Australia
2007	EXIT Project	Mystery Journey of Girl With Her Death	Russia
2007	The Future Kings of England	The Fate of Old Mother Orvis	UK
2007	FromUz	Audio Diplomacy	Uzbekistan
2007	Glass	Live at Progman Cometh	US
2007	Hidria Spacefolk	Symetria	Finland
2007	Little Tragedies	Chinese Songs	Russia
2007	Magic Pie	Circus of Life	Norway
2007	Mechanical Poet	Creepy Tales for Freaky Children	Russia
2007	Mechanical Poet	Who Did It To Michelle Waters?	Russia
2007	Magellan	Innocent God	US
2007	Outer Limits	Stromatolite	Japan
2007	Pentwater	Ab-Dul	US
2007	Pomme De Chien	The Allegory of Benjamin Franklin	Canada
2007	Pomme De Chien	Pandamonium	Canada
2007	Sylvan	Presets	Germany
2007	Témpano	Memoria selectiva - Selective memory	Venezuela
2007	Thought Chamber	Angular Perceptions	US

=== Disbandments ===
- Ved Buens Ende (after less than a year back together)

=== Events ===
- Canadian rock band Rush streamed their lead single "Far Cry" from their official website a day before releasing it to terrestrial radio stations.
- UK Progressive Rock festival SummersEnd announces its second year after a successful first year at the Robin venue in Bilston, Wolverhampton, UK.
- 1980s neo-progressive band Twelfth Night reunite for the first time since 1987 for sporadic live appearances.
- Muse were the first band to sell out the newly rebuilt Wembley Stadium, performing two nights there and filming the shows for their H.A.A.R.P live album and DVD.

== 2008 ==
=== Newly formed bands ===
- Demians (France)
- Traumatized (Korea Rep.)
- Octillian (Canada)
- Awake (Australia)
- Timeless Infamy (US)
- Ill Omen (Australia)
- Oh, Lenore! (Canada)

=== Albums ===
Release date	Artist	Album	Country
3 January 2008	Moon Safari	Blomljud	Sweden
25 January 2008	Ayreon	01011001	Netherlands
26 January 2008	The Mars Volta	The Bedlam in Goliath	US
29 January 2008	Protest The Hero	Fortress	Canada
18 February 2008	To-Mera	Delusions	England
29 February 2008	RPWL	The RPWL Experience	Germany
3 March 2008	The Tangent	Not as Good as the Book	England
7 March 2008	Meshuggah	ObZen	Sweden
17 March 2008	Van der Graaf Generator	Trisector	England
11 April 2008	Asia	Phoenix	England
12 April 2008	Cog	Sharing Space	Australia
14 May 2008	Von Hertzen Brothers	Love Remains the Same	Finland
19 May 2008	Beardfish	Sleeping in Traffic: Part Two	Sweden
30 May 2008	Opeth	Watershed	Sweden
13 June 2008	Frank Zappa	One Shot Deal	US
20 June 2008	Sigur Rós	Með suð í eyrum við spilum endalaust	Iceland
9 September 2008	The Sound of Animals Fighting	The Ocean and the Sun	US
1 October 2008	Frank Zappa	Joe's Menage	US
1 October 2008	Pendragon	Pure	England
14 October 2008	Between The Buried And Me	Colors Live	US
20 October 2008	Marillion	Happiness is the Road	England
27 October 2008	Karmakanic	Who's the Boss in the Factory?	Sweden
11 November 2008	Dir En Grey	Uroboros	Japan
18 November 2008	Unitopia	The Garden	Australia
31 December 2008	Disen Gage	...The Reverse May Be True	Russia
2008	Abel Ganz	Shooting Albatross	Scotland
2008	a.P.A.t.T.	Black & White Mass	England
2008	7 Hz	-	Finland
2008	Robert Beriau	Selfishness: Source Of War & Violence	Canada
2008	Birds and Buildings	Bantom to Behemoth	US
2008	Demians	Building an Empire	France
2008	Everon	North	Germany
2008	Farpoint	Cold Star Quiet Star	US
2008	FromUz	Overlook	Uzbekistan
2008	Little Tragedies	Cross	Russia
2008	Mostly Autumn	Glass Shadows	England
2008	Pomme De Chien	The Five Food Groups	Canada
2008	Qelbanix	Infinit Relativ	Albania
2008	Pomme De Chien	Untitled {Thoughts of You}	Canada
2008	Sanctuary Rig	Khnosti	England
2008	Unjust	Too Lose a Name	US

=== Events ===
- Progressive Nation 2008 takes place, featuring Dream Theater, Opeth, Between the Buried and Me, and 3.
- Liquid Tension Experiment goes on a 10th anniversary tour.
- Rush's first drummer John Rutsey dies. Rutsey played on Rush's debut album.
- Richard Wright, keyboardist for Pink Floyd, dies of complications due to cancer.
- Coheed and Cambria play Neverender, a series of four-night shows played from October to November in four cities.
- Jon Anderson is fired from Yes after being admitted to hospital and Rick Wakeman leaves due to health complications. They are replaced by Benoît David and Oliver Wakeman (Rick's son).
- Cardiacs frontman Tim Smith suffers a heart attack after attending a My Bloody Valentine gig, causing lifelong dystonia.

== 2009 ==
=== Newly formed bands ===
- Ashes Of Nothing (Slovenia)
- Sincara (Norway)
- Projected Twin (Australia)
- The Hopeful Calling (Canada)
- Intrepid (Canada)
- The Pepper Machine (France)
- The Muhittin Experience (Turkey)
- Caterpillarmen (Iceland)
- Astra (US)

=== Albums ===
Release date	Artist	Album	Country
23 Jan 2009	Frank Zappa	Lumpy Money	US
Jan 2009	Daedalus	The Never Ending Illusion	Italy
Jan 2009	Henry Cow	The 40th Anniversary Henry Cow Box Set	England
Feb 2009	Wobbler	Afterglow	Norway
15 Mar 2009	Gazpacho	Tick Tock	Norway
24 Mar 2009	The Decemberists	The Hazards of Love	US
24 Mar 2009	Mastodon	Crack the Skye	US
27 Apr 2009	OSI	Blood	US
4 May 2009	Tinyfish	Curious Things	England
11 May 2009	Anekdoten	Chapters	Sweden
14 May 2009	maudlin of the Well	Part the Second	US
19 May 2009	Saga	The Human Condition	Canada
25 May 2009	Astra	The Weirding	US
26 May 2009	IQ	Frequency	England
27 May 2009	Amorphis	Skyforger	Finland
29 May 2009	Phideaux Xavier	Number Seven	US
5 Jun 2009	Karnivool	Sound Awake	Australia
9 Jun 2009	Quidam	The Fifth Season - Live In Concert	Poland
19 Jun 2009	Riverside	Anno Domini High Definition	Poland
22 Jun 2009	Marillion	Recital of the Script	England
23 Jun 2009	Dream Theater	Black Clouds & Silver Linings	US
23 Jun 2009	The Dear Hunter	Act III: Life and Death	US
23 Jun 2009	The Mars Volta	Octahedron	US
Jun 2009	Peter Hammill	Thin Air	England
24 Jul 2009	Beardfish	Destined Solitaire	Sweden
11 Aug 2009	Tinyfish	One Night on Fire	England
14 Sep 2009	Muse	The Resistance	England
14 Sep 2009	Porcupine Tree	The Incident	England
16 Sep 2009	Sonata Arctica	The Days of Grays	Finland
21 Sep 2009	Gong	2032	England
21 Sep 2009	Gong	Gong Global Family - Live in Brazil 2007	England
23 Oct 2009	Transatlantic	The Whirlwind	Various
26 Oct 2009	Oceansize	Home and Minor	England
27 Oct 2009	Between the Buried and Me	The Great Misdirect	US
27 Oct 2009	3	Revisions	US
30 Oct 2009	Steve Hackett	Out of the Tunnel's Mouth	England
3 Nov 2009	Glass Hammer	Three Cheers for the Broken-Hearted	US
16 Nov 2009	The Tangent	Down and Out in Paris and London	England
8 Dec 2009	Thirty Seconds to Mars	This Is War	US
15 Dec 2009	Big Big Train	The Underfall Yard	United Kingdom
21 Dec 2009	Frank Zappa	Philly '76	US
2009	AraPacis	Consequences of Dreams	England
2009	Barclay James Harvest	Sea Of Tranquility ~ The Polydor Years • 1974-1997	England
2009	Deluge Grander	The Form of the Good	US
2009	Different Light	Icons That Weep	Czech Republic
2009	IZZ	The Darkened Room	US
2009	Little Tragedies	Paris Symphony	Russia
2009	Manir Donaghue	Reflections	England
2009	Mostly Autumn	Pass the Clock	England
2009	Nurkostam	III of Dreamers	Finland
2009	Pantokraator	Tormidesööjad	Estonia
2009	Anthony Phillips	Missing Links Volume IV: Pathways & Promenades	England
2009	Sylvan	Force of Gravity	Germany
2009	The Future Kings of England	The Viewing Point	UK
2009	The Pineapple Thief	3000 Days	England

=== Events ===
- Soft Machine bassist Hugh Hopper dies on June 7.
- Progressive rock supergroup, Transatlantic, reunites in April with the original line-up (Neal Morse, Pete Trewavas, Roine Stolt, and Mike Portnoy). They release their third studio album, The Whirlwind, in October and announce a 2010 world tour.
- The Norwegian group Ark officially reunites and begin songwriting sessions for the third album.
- Original lead vocalist of Crimson Glory, Midnight, dies on June 8 of a stomach aneurysm.

== See also ==
- Timeline of progressive rock: other decades: 1960s - 1970s - 1980s - 1990s - 2010s – 2020s
- Timeline of progressive rock (Parent article)
- Progressive rock
- Canterbury Scene
- Symphonic rock
- Avant-rock
- Rock in Opposition
- Neo-prog
- Progressive metal
- Jazz fusion
