= Future Kings =

Future Kings may refer to:

- Future Kings of Spain, a rock band and their self-titled debut album
- The Future Kings of England, a rock band and their self-titled album
- "Future Kings", a song by Reks on his album The Greatest X
- Inhumans: Once & Future Kings, a comic book series centering on the superhero group Inhumans
