= Early Recordings from Kansas 1971–1973 =

Studio album by Proto-Kaw
- Released: 21 October 2002
- Recorded: 1971–1974
- Genre: Progressive rock
- Length: 78:54
- Label: Cuneiform

Proto-Kaw chronology
Early Recordings from Kansas 1971–1973 (2002)	Before Became After (2005)

Professional ratings
Review scores
Source	Rating
AllMusic	3.5/5 stars

Early Recordings from Kansas 1971–1973 is a collection of recordings made by the second edition of Kansas (Proto-Kaw) released in 2002 on Cuneiform Records. The songs contain numerous nods to the then-burgeoning scene of experimental progressive rock, often echoing the early work of luminaries King Crimson. The tracks "Belexes" and "Incomudro" were later recorded for the Kansas albums Kansas and Song for America, respectively.

== Track listing ==
All tracks by Kerry Livgren

1. "Hegemonium" – 7:49
2. "Reunion in the Mountains of Sarne" – 7:47
3. "Nactolos 21" – 11:38
4. "Belexes" – 5:11
5. "Totus Nemesis" – 13:54
6. "Greek Structure Sunbeam" – 5:42
7. "Incomudro" – 11:28
8. "Cyclopy" (live) – 5:46
9. "Skont" (live) – 9:39

== Musicians ==
- Lynn Meredith – vocals
- John Bolton – electric saxophone, flute
- Don Montre – piano, flute, alto saxophone
- Kerry Livgren – guitars
- Dan Wright – hammond organ
- Rod Mikinski – bass
- Zeke Low – drums
- Brad Schulz – drums

== Release details ==
- 2002, USA, Cuneiform Records Rune 171, Release date 21 October 2002, CD
