= The Black Chord =

Studio album by Astra
- Released: March 27, 2012
- Recorded: April–October 2011
- Genre: Progressive rock, psychedelic rock, space rock
- Length: 47:04
- Label: Metal Blade, Rise Above
- Producer: Ian Lehrfeld

Astra chronology
The Weirding (2009)	The Black Chord (2012)

Professional ratings
Review scores
Source	Rating
heavymetal.about.com	4.5/5 stars
Spin	8/10 stars
Sputnikmusic	4.5/5 stars
ytsejam.com	5/5 stars

The Black Chord is an album by American progressive rock band Astra. It is their second album, released in the United States on March 27, 2012 on Metal Blade Records, and on April 16 in the United Kingdom on the independent label Rise Above Records.

== Reception ==
The album inspired positive reviews upon release, and was praised for its even more psychedelic and space rock feel as well as higher production values compared to their debut The Weirding. The heavy metal review at About.com stated "San Diego maestros Astra craft expansive suites that hearken back to the original root of mind-expanding, unrestrained and genuinely progressive rock. Rich with hallucinogenic and hypnotic promise, and slathered in layers of vintage, billowing instrumentation, the band's stunning sophomore album, The Black Chord, expertly evokes the spirit, tone and vision of '70s cosmic prog." Ytsejam.com described the album as "combining the dark grooves of Sabbath, with the improvisational tangents of King Crimson, the moods of the early eras of both Yes and Genesis, as well as hints of space rock from Hawkwind… the use of crunched guitars, brass [sic], woodwinds, a variety of Mellotron sounds and Moog/analog synths, syncopated jazz drumming, and growling bass… yield honest results as everything sounds organic…." According to Sound Colour Vibration, there is a "depth and reality that a lot of progressive rock bands fail to obtain."

== Track listing ==
No.	Title	Length
1.	"Cocoon"	8:43
2.	"The Black Chord"	14:58
3.	"Quake Meat"	6:39
4.	"Drift"	4:37
5.	"Bull Torpis"	2:54
6.	"Barefoot in the Head"	9:13

== Personnel ==
- Richard Vaughan: vocals, electric guitar, Mellotron M400, Memotron, Minimoog, Moog Rogue, Echoplex
- Conor Riley: vocals, Mellotron M400, Memotron, Minimoog, Moog Rogue, ARP Odyssey, Oberheim Two Voice, Crumar Orchestrator, Hammond A-100 organ, grand piano
- Brian Ellis: lead electric guitar, electric 12-string guitar, acoustic guitar
- Stuart Sclater: bass
- David Hurley: drums, percussion, flute

== Production ==
- Produced, engineered and mixed by Ian Lehrfeld
- Mastered by Brad Blackwood
- Album sleeve art, design & illustration by Arik "Moonhawk" Roper
