= The Big Red Spark =

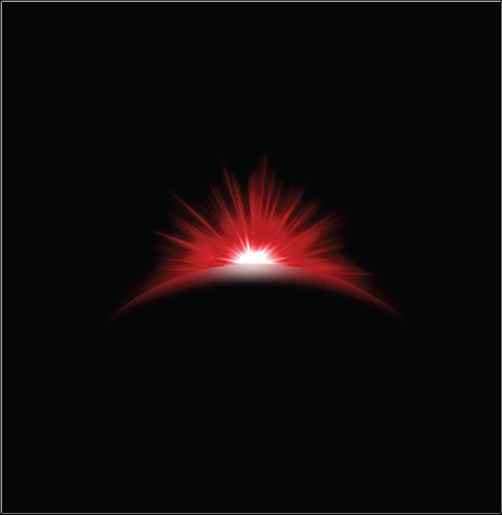

Studio album by Tinyfish
- Released: 13 September 2010
- Genre: Progressive rock
- Length: 53:27
- Label: Festival Music
- Producer: Mike Varty & Simon Godfrey

Tinyfish chronology
| One Night On Fire (2009) | The Big Red Spark (2010) |

Professional ratings
Review scores
| Source | Rating |
|---|---|
| Classic Rock | October 2010 |
| The Harmonic Lizard | |

The Big Red Spark is the second full-length album by the English progressive rock band Tinyfish.

== Track listing ==
1. "The Loose Ends" – 3:11 (Godfrey/Ramsay)
2. "Rainland" – 6:54 (Godfrey/Ramsay/Sanders)
3. "A Million Differences" - 2:05 (Godfrey/Ramsay/Sanders)
4. "Bad Weather Road" - 6:20 (Godfrey/Ramsay)
5. "I'm Not Crashing" - 4:36 (Godfrey)
6. "Building The Machine" - 3:16 (Godfrey/Ramsay)
7. "Refugee" - 2:24 (Godfrey/Ramsay)
8. "The Big Red Spark" - 4:51 (Godfrey/Ramsay/Sanders/Worwood)
9. "Weak Machine" - 3:28 (Godfrey)
10. "Activation" - 0:38 (Godfrey/Ramsay)
11. "The Final Act" - 2:36 (Godfrey/Ramsay/Sanders)
12. "The Loose Ends Pt II" - 2:42 (Godfrey/Ramsay)
13. "Wide Awake At Midnight" - 10:21 (Godfrey/Ramsay/Sanders/Worwood)

== Bonus disc DVD listing ==
Initial pressings of The Big Red Spark came with a bonus DVD containing a video interview with the band and the following four additional tracks:

1. "The Sarcasm Never Stops" - 5:17 (Godfrey/Ramsay)
2. "Ride" - 5:26 (Godfrey/Ramsay)
3. "Eat The Ashes" - 3:19 (Godfrey)
4. "Let's Get Invisible" - 4:02 (Godfrey/Ramsay)

== Personnel ==
- Simon Godfrey – Vocals, rhythm guitars and drums
- Jim Sanders - Lead and rhythm guitars
- Paul Worwood - Bass guitar
- Robert Ramsay - Voice of the young Professor

with

- Iain Houston - Voice of the Refugee
- Peter Godfrey - Voice of the old Professor
- Jem Godfrey - Mellotron on "Weak Machine"
- Geoff Wootton - Lead vocals on "Ride"
- Mike Varty - Keyboards on "Ride"

and The Big Red Strings

- Zhanna Neckrich - Violin
- Dina Zikeyeva - Violin
- Gocha Skhirlasze - Violin
- Marianna Pulkis - Viola
- Felix Korobov - Cello

== Reception ==
The Big Red Spark was awarded nine out of ten by Geoff Barton in the October edition of Classic Rock.
