= The Wait of Glory =

Studio album by Proto-Kaw
- Released: 31 January 2006
- Recorded: 2005
- Genre: Progressive rock
- Length: 70:41
- Label: InsideOut
- Producer: Kerry Livgren

Proto-Kaw chronology
Before Became After (2005)	The Wait of Glory (2006)	Forth (2011)

Professional ratings
Review scores
Source	Rating
Allmusic	3/5 stars

The Wait of Glory is the third album from Proto-Kaw after their retrospective initial release and debut recording Before Became After.

The album introduced newcomers Mike Patrum (drums) and Jake Livgren on lead and background vocals, alto saxophone, and percussion. Jake Livgren had been with the band since its re-inception, but was officially credited as a member for the first time on this album.

The Special Edition release includes the primary eleven tracks, plus a bonus studio track and a DVD with songs from the band's performance at North East Art Rock Festival (NEARfest) on July 8, 2005.

The album was recorded at Grandyzine Recording Company, Berryton, Kansas. Kerry Livgren was engineer on the album and Ken Westphal provided the cover art.

== Track listing ==
All songs written by Kerry Livgren.

1. "Nevermore" – 9:17
2. "Relics of the Tempest" – 5:07
3. "When the Rains Come" – 8:56
4. "On the Eve of the Great Decline" – 4:51
5. "Physic" – 5:45
6. "At Morning's Gate" – 3:11
7. "Melicus Gladiator" – 4:52
8. "The Vigil" – 7:20
9. "Old Number 63 (Is What It Always Was)" – 6:51
10. "Osvaldo's Groceries" – 3:17
11. "Picture This" – 6:42

Bonus track on special edition

12. "One Fine Day" – 4:32

Special edition DVD of July 2005 performance at Progressive Legends Rock Festival

1. "The Occasion of Your Honest Dreaming" – 6:12
2. "Words of Honour" – 4:40
3. "Skont" – 8:01

== Musicians ==
=== Band members ===
- Lynn Meredith – vocals, narration
- John Bolton – saxophones, flute
- Kerry Livgren – guitars, piano, keyboards, percussion, background vocals
- Dan Wright – organ, keyboards, percussion, background vocals
- Craig Kew – bass, background vocals
- Mike Patrum – drums
- Jake Livgren – guitar, alto saxophone, keyboards, percussion, backing vocals, lead vocals (on Melicus Gladiator)

=== Guest musicians ===
- Daryl Batchelor – Trumpet, Flugelhorn

== Release details ==
- 2006, USA, InsideOut Music SPV48772, Release date 31 January 2006, CD
- 2006, USA, InsideOut Music SPV48770, Release date 31 January 2006, CD special edition
