= Proto-Kaw =

American progressive rock band

- Origin: United States
- Genres: Progressive rock
- Years active: 1971–1973, 2004–2008, 2011–
- Labels: Cuneiform, Inside Out
- Spinoff of: Kansas
- Members: John Bolton; Kerry Livgren; Lynn Meredith; Dan Wright; Craig Kew; Mike Patrum; Jake Livgren
- Past members: Zeke Low; Rod Mikinski; Don Montre; Brad Schulz

Proto-Kaw is an American progressive rock band. Featuring Kerry Livgren, the group is a reformation of a band formed in the early 1970s which served as the direct precursor to Kansas.

== History ==
In the early 1970s, the band Kansas went through three incarnations, the common member in all three being composer, keyboardist and guitarist Kerry Livgren. The sound of the band changed along with the group members. Proto-Kaw is a modern name given to the second version of Kansas, whose arrangements prominently featured guitar, keyboards, and saxophone (an instrument not found in the following line-up.) The famous Kansas was actually the third edition of the band, and before a name change it was the third incarnation of Topeka band White Clover.

Formed in 1971 and disbanding in 1973, "Kansas II" played mostly original material written by Livgren. After Kansas II broke up, the group went their separate ways with Livgren reaching fame with the more-popular Kansas and the others assuming normal lives. Then in 2002, the band's demos saw release as Early Recordings from Kansas 1971-1973, which gave the band the new moniker Proto-Kaw. The name was derived from the words Proto ("original"), and Kaw (the root of the word Kansas, referring to a Native American tribe). Most members had not had any contact with each other for the intervening 30 years and many did not play music during this time. However, when they came together to celebrate the album's release, they rediscovered their old chemistry. Proto-Kaw reformed and at last got to record its first proper album, "Before Became After" (2004).

The band released its second new CD in February, 2006, titled The Wait of Glory which features 12 new original songs from writer Kerry Livgren. Coinciding with the album release the band embarked on a European tour, bringing it to four countries in seven days.

== Disbanded ==
In May 2007, the band reported it had begun studio work on its next effort, a collection of new tracks coupled with several previously recorded Livgren tracks interpreted by Proto-Kaw. However, in early December 2008 Kerry Livgren confirmed that Proto Kaw was no longer together for a variety of external reasons. Several tracks of the pending album were worked on, but plans to include them on a Proto-Kaw album were scuttled. Livgren thought that they may appear within a solo work of Livgren's at some future, undetermined date.

== Reunited again ==
Following Kerry Livgren's massive stroke, and partial recovery, he announced in late 2010 that Proto-Kaw was back together and at work on a new album, slated for January 2011 release.

The new album entitled Forth was released on Livgren's Numavox website in August 2011 and a CD release party was held in Kansas City.

== Band members ==
Original band

- Lynn Meredith – vocals
- John Bolton – electric saxophone, flute
- Don Montre – RMI piano, flute, alto saxophone
- Kerry Livgren – guitar, piano
- Dan Wright – Hammond organ
- Rod Mikinski – bass guitar
- Zeke Low – drums
- Brad Schulz – drums

Current band

- Kerry Livgren – guitar, keyboards
- Lynn Meredith – vocals, narration
- John Bolton – saxophones, flute
- Dan Wright – organ, keyboards, percussion, background vocals
- Craig Kew – bass, background vocals
- Mike Patrum – drums
- Jake Livgren – lead and backing vocals, saxophones, guitars, keyboards, percussion

== Discography ==
=== Studio albums ===
- Early Recordings from Kansas 1971-1973 (2002)
- Before Became After (2004)
- The Wait of Glory (2006)
- Forth (2011)
