= Moon Safari (band) =

Swedish progressive rock band

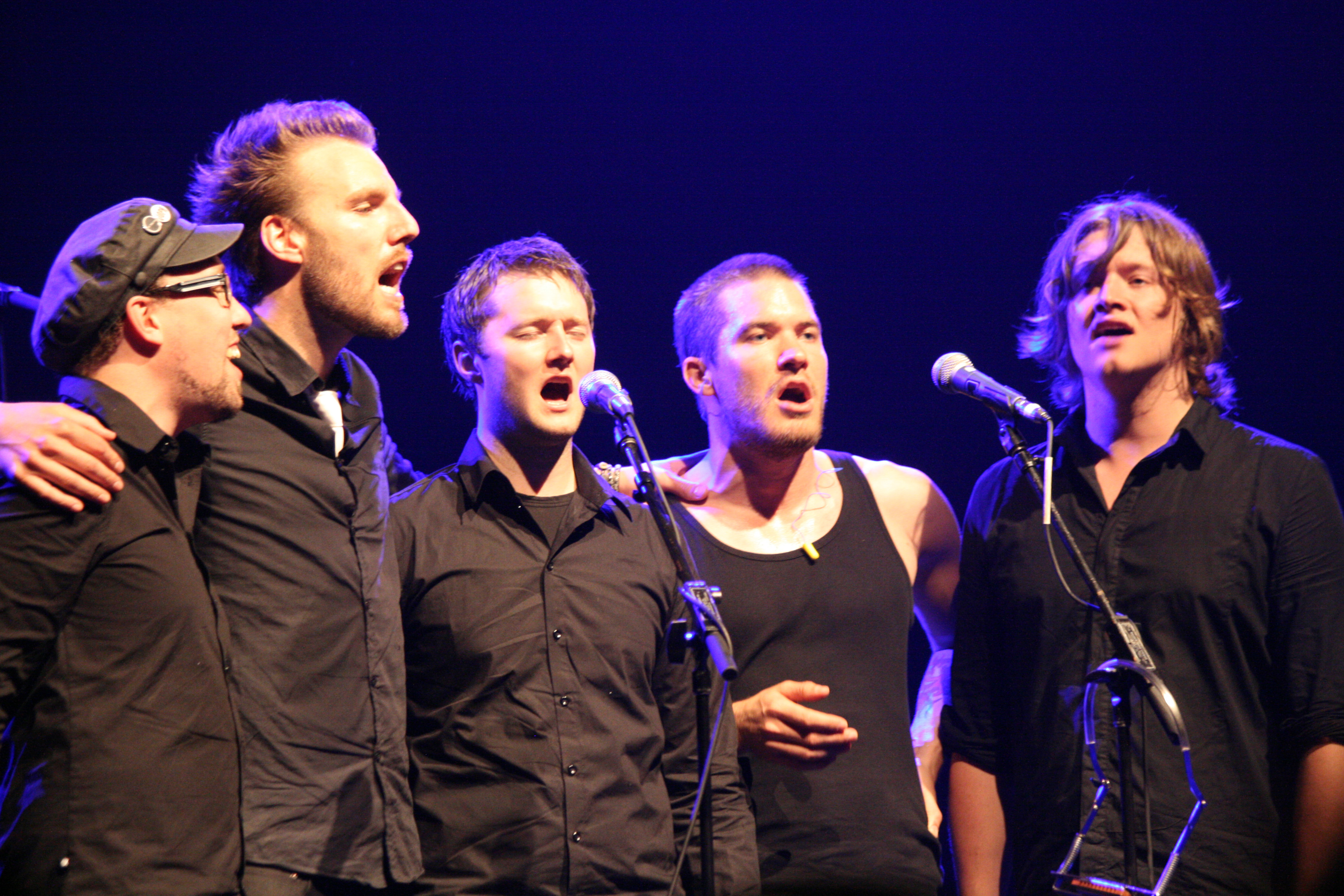
- Moon Safari in May 2009 at Rites of Spring Festival (Rosfest)

Background information
- Origin: Skellefteå, Sweden
- Genres: Progressive rock
- Years active: 2003–present
- Labels: Blomljud
- Members: Simon Åkesson; Petter Sandström; Johan Westerlund; Pontus Åkesson; Sebastian Åkesson; Mikael Israelsson
- Past members: Anthon Johansson; Tobias Lundgren; Tomas Bodin
- Website: www.moonsafari.se

Moon Safari is a Swedish progressive rock band formed in Skellefteå in 2003. It gained recognition after it recorded a demo tape that caught the attention of keyboardist Tomas Bodin of The Flower Kings. Their genre is predominantly symphonic rock, though their music incorporates many different styles. Common characteristics of their sound include intricate vocal harmonization, acoustic or smoothly electric instrumentals, and pervasive tonal structures in the major and minor modes.

== History ==
Moon Safari formed in 2003. The first line-up was formed of keyboardist and singer Simon Åkesson, guitarist and singer Petter Sandström, bassist Johan Westerlund, guitarist Anthon Johansson, and drummer Tobias Lundgren, lasting until 2005. They released four studio albums, recorded and mixed by the group and released on their own label, Blomljud Records. Their first, A Doorway to Summer (2005) was produced by Tomas Bodin, the keyboardist of fellow Swedish progressive rock band The Flower Kings. It evokes themes of summer, the sun, and light in general as a comforting and hopeful concept. In their double album Blomljud (2008), Swedish for "Flower Sound", themes of flowers and nature prevail throughout, with science fiction themes also playing a key role.

Lover's End (2010) juxtaposes the story of a painful breakup with themes of nascent love, illustrating and accentuating emotions commonly associated with the stages before, during, and after a romantic relationship. Their EP Lover's End Pt. III: Skellefteå Serenade (2012) functions as a continuation of the breakup story described in Lover's End, with an additional emphasis on the powerful feelings associated with one's hometown. It also develops and reprises themes from the songs Lover's End Pt. I and Lover's End Pt. II.

Their first live album The Gettysburg Address (2012) was recorded at a performance in Gettysburg, Pennsylvania, and features songs from their first three studio albums. Their fourth studio album, Himlabacken Vol. 1 (2013), Swedish for "Heaven Hill", is about the band's childhoods, growing up, and responsibilities of adulthood.

On 11 July 2017, Simon Åkesson announced he was leaving the group via Facebook, but rejoined later the same year.

On 31 August 2023, the group announced that their fifth studio album, Himlabacken Vol. 2, would be released on 8 December of that year.

== Musical style ==
The musical style of Moon Safari is characterised by a symphonic rock sound with five-part vocal harmonies, something that the group struggled with at first until Simon taught the band how to perform them as each one could sing. Lundgren later said the harmonies soon became second nature. Simon Åkesson and Petter Sandström each perform lead vocals, with both of their voices often providing solo vocal melodies. However, all six members contribute to the vocal aspect of their music. Many of their melodies are sung as full vocal harmonies, and a number of their songs feature a capella sections. Major keys comprise the majority of their music, with minor keys often featured only in specific sections of their songs. They list their influences as The Beatles, and notable progressive rock bands Genesis, Marillion, IQ, and Yes, among others.

== Awards ==
Moon Safari won the 9th annual Independent Music Awards Vox Pop vote for best Eclectic Album "In the Countryside". The Classic Rock Society awarded them the 2012 title of "best track" for their song Lover's End Pt. III: Skellefteå Serenade

== Personnel ==
Current members

- Petter Sandström - lead vocals, acoustic guitar, harmonica (2003–present)
- Johan Westerlund - bass, backing and occasional lead vocals (2003–present)
- Simon Åkesson - lead vocals, keyboards, synthesizers (2003–2017, 2017-present)
- Pontus Åkesson - guitars, backing and occasional lead vocals (2005–present)
- Sebastian Åkesson - keyboards, percussion, backing vocals (2008–present; studio only since 2024)
- Mikael Israelsson - drums, percussion, keyboards, backing vocals (2015–present)

Former members

- Anthon Johansson - guitars, backing vocals (2003–2005)
- Tobias Lundgren - drums, percussion, backing vocals (2003–2015)
- Tomas Bodin - keyboards, synthesizers, backing vocals (2017)

Timeline

== Discography ==
Studio albums

- A Doorway to Summer (2005)
- Blomljud (2008)
- Lover's End (2010)
- Himlabacken Vol. 1 (2013)
- Himlabacken Vol. 2 (2023)

EPs

- Lover's End Pt. III: Skellefteå Serenade (2012)

Live albums

- The Gettysburg Address (2012)
- Live in Mexico (2014)
