= Curious Things =

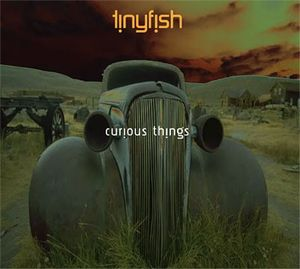

Studio album by Tinyfish
- Released: 4 May 2009
- Genre: Progressive rock
- Length: 28:49
- Label: Festival Music
- Producer: Tinyfish; Mixed by Jem Godfrey

Tinyfish chronology
Tinyfish (2006)	Curious Things (2009)	One Night On Fire (2009)

Curious Things is a mini-album by the English progressive rock band Tinyfish.

== Track listing ==
1. "The June Jar" – 3:20
2. "Ack Ack" – 0:25
3. "She's All I Want" – 3:03
4. "Driving All Night" – 4:12
5. "Why VHF?" – 8:18
6. "Wrecking Ball" - 3:28
7. "Cinnamon" - 6:03

== Personnel ==
- Simon Godfrey – Lead vocals, guitars, guitar synthesizer, drums
- Jim Sanders – Guitars, backing vocals
- Paul Worwood – Bass guitar, bass pedals
- Robert Ramsay – Spoken word, harmonica

== Reception ==
Curious Things was named as fifteenth best album of 2009 by Geoff Barton in Classic Rock Presents Prog, a sister publication of the UK magazine Classic Rock.
