= Olive Mess =

Latvian musical group

- Origin: Riga, Latvia
- Genres: Avant-prog, progressive rock, progressive folk, medieval folk, experimental rock
- Years active: 1998–present
- Labels: Soleil Zeuhl, Mellow
- Members: Denis Arsenin; Edgar Kempish; Alexey Syomin; Ilze Paegle; Lilija Voronova; Sergey Syomin

Olive Mess is a progressive rock band from Latvia that sings in English. They are one of the most famous Baltic progressive rock bands.

== History ==
The band was formed in 1998 by Denis Arsenin (bass), Edgars Kempišs (drums) and Alexey Syomin (guitar).

In 2001, the group self-released a demo recording made during a rehearsal, Live Without Audience. The main theme of the record was history of Medieval France.

Later in 2001 more members joined the group: Ilze Paegle (classical trained soprano singer), Lilija Voronova (keyboards) and Sergey Syomin (Archlute, Baroque guitar).

In 2002 the band was signed by the French music label Soleil Zeuhl and released their debut album, Gramercy. The album consisted of 5 tracks with a total length of more than one hour.

After the successful debut album, the band was invited to a variety of regional and local prog rock festivals, including InProg 2005, to open the second day of the festival, Proguary 2005 and Proguary 2006 (photo coverage), Latvia's first widely publicised progressive rock festival. They also played at BalticProgFest 2007, the biggest Baltic progressive rock festival, organised in Lithuania.

On 6 September 2007 the band released their second album, Cherdak. The album was released on a new record label, the Italian Mellow Records, sometime in 2008 and consists of 4 tracks. In November 2007 the band went on tour to promote their latest album.

== Discography ==
This list includes only official discography.

- Gramercy (2002) (Soleil Zeuhl)
- Cherdak (2008) (Mellow Records)

== Trivia ==
- The band named itself in honour of the 20th-century French composer Olivier Messiaen.
