= The Watch (band) =

Italian progressive rock band

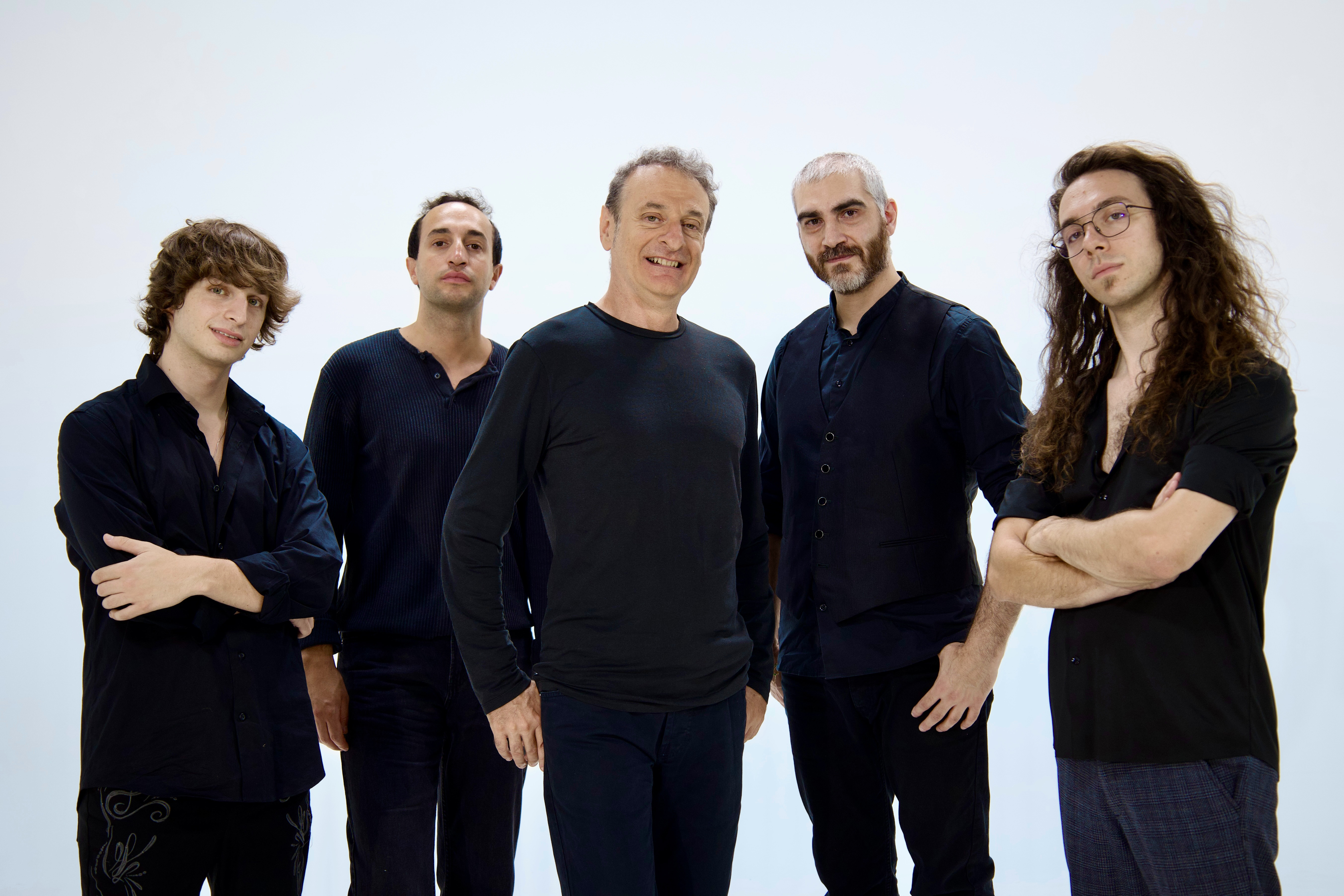
- The Watch in 2024

Background information
- Also known as: The Night Watch (1997–2000)
- Origin: Milan, Italy
- Genre: Progressive rock
- Years active: 1997–present
- Label: Pick Up Records
- Members: Simone Rossetti (Vocals); Francesco Vaccarezza (Drums); Giacomo Gagliardini (Guitar); Valerio De Vittorio (Keyboards); Mattia Rossetti (Bass)
- Past members: Giovanni Alessi; Diego Donadio; Antonio Mauri; Francesco Zago; Roberto Leoni; Ettore Salati; Marco Schembri; Gabriele Manzini; Sergio Taglioni; Fabio Mancini; Cristiano Roversi; Guglielmo Mariotti; Stefano Castrucci; Marco Fabbri; Giorgio Gabriel; Andrea Giustiniani
- Website: thewatchmusic.net

The Watch is an Italian progressive rock band from Milan, led by vocalist, principal songwriter and teacher Simone Rossetti, originally formed in 1997. Their music is inspired by classic progressive rock style of the 1970s and in particular by the music of Genesis. Melody and energy are the main aspects of The Watch music and the live dimension is one of the greatest features of the band.

== History ==
The band was founded in 1997 with the name 'The Night Watch', lining up vocalist Simone Rossetti, guitarist Francesco Zago, bassist Antonio Mauri, keyboardist Giovanni Alessi and drummer Diego Donadio. The band released their debut album, Twilight, before the line-up collapsed in 2000 leaving only Rossetti to continue the band under the shortened name 'The Watch'.

Following the name change, Rossetti rebuilt the band with a new line-up that initially consisted of himself, guitarist Ettore Salati, bassist Marco Schembri, keyboardist Gabriele Manzini and drummer Roberto Leoni: they released their next two albums, 2001's Ghost and 2004's Vacuum. Manzini departed following Vacuum's release and was replaced by longtime band collaborator Sergio Taglioni (who had performed some keyboards on the band's two previous albums), who remained in the band for the fan released Live Bootleg in 2006, as for the band's fourth studio album as well, 2007's Primitive, and the band's first official live album in 2008.

It was at this point in 2008 that the band underwent its second major line-up change, as once again all of the members with the exception of Rossetti (Leoni, Salati, Schembri, and Taglioni) departed the band, with the new line-up consisting of Rossetti, drummer Marco Fabbri, guitarist Giorgio Gabriel, keyboardist Fabio Mancini and bassist Cristiano Roversi. Further line-up changes occurred in 2009 when Mancini and Roversi departed the band and were replaced by Valerio De Vittorio and Guglielmo Mariotti respectively. The band once again found stability, and over the following four years they would release the Planet Earth? (2010) and Timeless (2011) studio albums, and the Green Show 2011 – Official Live Bootleg (2012) live album.

In 2013 the band underwent a further line-up change when Mariotti left the band, and was replaced by Stefano Castrucci, who in turn was replaced the following year by Mattia Rossetti, the son of the band's frontman Simone Rossetti. This band's new line-up produced their most recent studio output, 2014's Tracks from the Alps and 2017's Seven and continues to exist to this day.

In 2022, Marco Fabbri left the band and was replaced by Francesco Vaccarezza and in 2023, Giorgio Gabriel left the band and was replaced by Andrea Giustiniani.

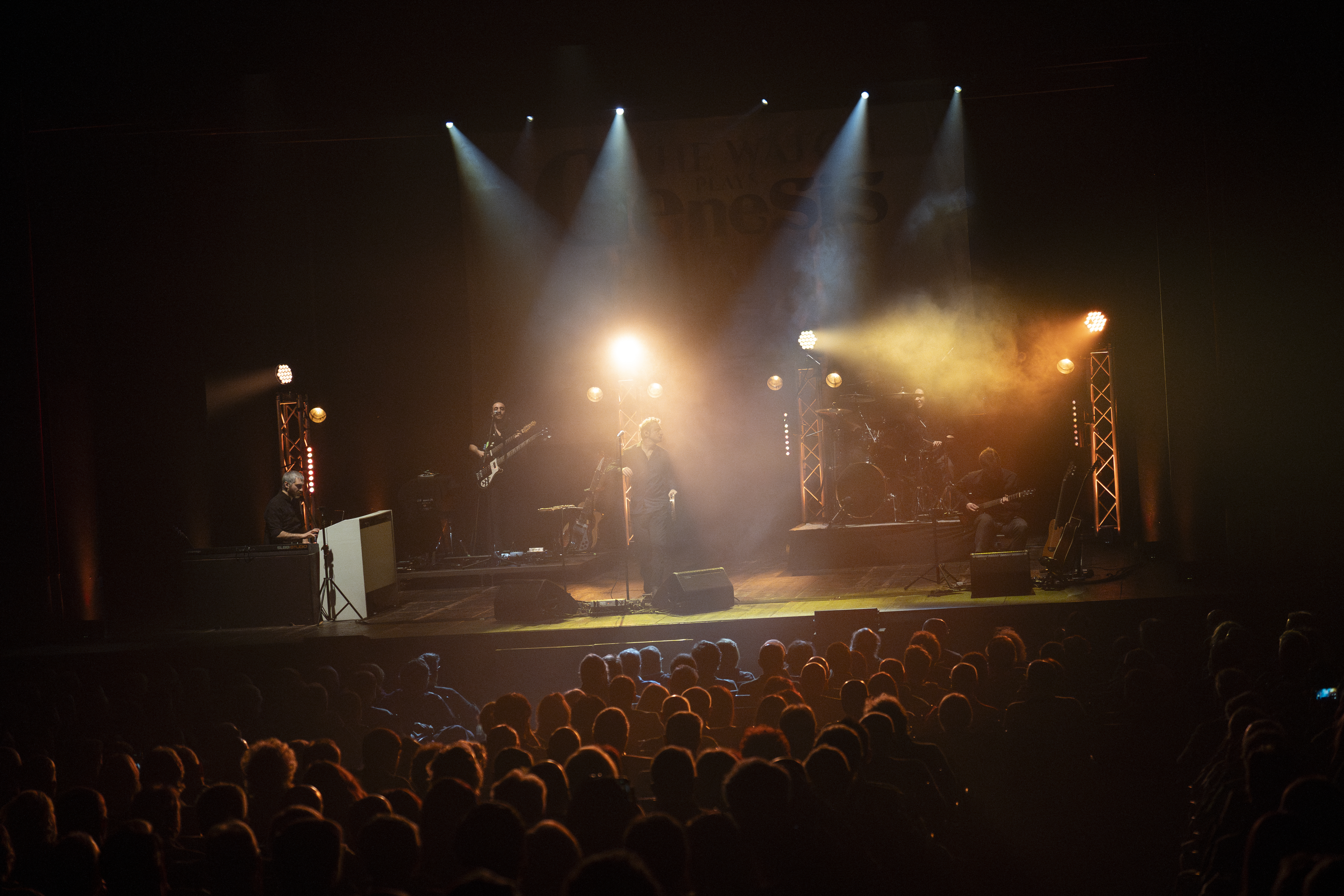
The Watch live at Teatro Carcano in Milan, Italy in 2024

== Personnel ==
=== Members ===
Current members

- Simone Rossetti – lead vocals, flute, keyboards, synthesisers (1997–present)
- Francesco Vaccarezza – drums, percussion (2022–present)
- Giacomo Gagliardini – lead guitars (2026–present)
- Valerio De Vittorio – keyboards, synthesisers (2009–present)
- Mattia Rossetti – bass, guitars (2014–present)

Former members

- Giovanni Alessi – keyboards, synthesisers (1997–2000)
- Diego Donadio – drums, percussion (1997–2000)
- Antonio Mauri – bass, guitars (1997–2000)
- Francesco Zago – lead guitars (1997–2000)
- Roberto Leoni – drums, percussion (2000–2008)
- Ettore Salati – lead guitars (2000–2008)
- Marco Schembri – bass, guitars (2000–2008)
- Gabriele Manzini – keyboards, synthesisers (2000–2004)
- Sergio Taglioni – keyboards, synthesisers (2004–2008)
- Fabio Mancini – keyboards, synthesisers (2008–2009)
- Cristiano Roversi – bass, guitars (2008–2009)
- Guglielmo Mariotti – bass, guitars (2009–2013)
- Stefano Castrucci – bass, guitars (2013–2014)
- Marco Fabbri – drums, percussion (2008–2022)
- Giorgio Gabriel – lead guitars (2008–2023)
- Andrea Giustiniani – lead guitars (2023–2026)

=== Lineups ===
Years	Lineup	Albums
1997–2000 (The Night Watch)	Simone Rossetti – vocals, flute, keyboards, synthesisers; Giovanni Alessi – keyboards, synthesisers; Diego Donadio – drums, percussion; Antonio Mauri – bass, guitars; Franceso Zago – lead guitars	Twilight (1997)
2000–2004	Simone Rossetti – vocals, flute, keyboards, synthesisers; Roberto Leoni – drums, percussion; Gabriele Manzini – keyboards, synthesisers; Ettore Salati – lead guitars; Marco Schembri – bass, guitars	Ghost (2001); Vacuum (2004)
2004–2008	Simone Rossetti – vocals, flute, keyboards, synthesisers; Roberto Leoni – drums, percussion; Ettore Salati – lead guitars; Marco Schembri – bass, guitars; Sergio Taglioni – keyboards, synthesisers	Live Bootleg (2006); Primitive (2007); Live (2008)
2008–2009	Simone Rossetti – vocals, flute, keyboards, synthesisers; Marco Fabbri – drums, percussion; Giorgio Gabriel – lead guitars; Fabio Mancini – keyboards, synthesisers; Cristiano Roversi – bass, guitars
2009–2013	Simone Rossetti – vocals, flute, keyboards, synthesisers; Marco Fabbri – drums, percussion; Giorgio Gabriel – lead guitars; Valerio De Vittorio – keyboards, synthesisers; Guglielmo Mariotti – bass, guitars	Planet Earth? (2010); Timeless (2011); Green Show 2011 – Official Live Bootleg (2012)
2013–2014	Simone Rossetti – vocals, flute, keyboards, synthesisers; Marco Fabbri – drums, percussion; Giorgio Gabriel – lead guitars; Valerio De Vittorio – keyboards, synthesisers; Stefano Castrucci – bass, guitars
2014–2022	Simone Rossetti – vocals, flute, keyboards, synthesisers; Marco Fabbri – drums, percussion; Giorgio Gabriel – lead guitars; Valerio De Vittorio – keyboards, synthesisers; Mattia Rossetti – bass, guitars	Tracks from the Alps (2014); Seven (2017)
2022–2023	Simone Rossetti – vocals, flute, keyboards, synthesisers; Francesco Vaccarezza – drums, percussion; Giorgio Gabriel – lead guitars; Valerio De Vittorio – keyboards, synthesisers; Mattia Rossetti – bass, guitars
2023–2026	Simone Rossetti – vocals, flute, keyboards, synthesisers; Francesco Vaccarezza – drums, percussion; Andrea Giustiniani – lead guitars; Valerio De Vittorio – keyboards, synthesisers; Mattia Rossetti – bass, guitars
2026 - Present	Simone Rossetti – vocals, flute, keyboards, synthesisers; Francesco Vaccarezza – drums, percussion; Giacomo Gagliardini – lead guitars; Valerio De Vittorio – keyboards, synthesisers; Mattia Rossetti – bass, guitars

== Discography ==
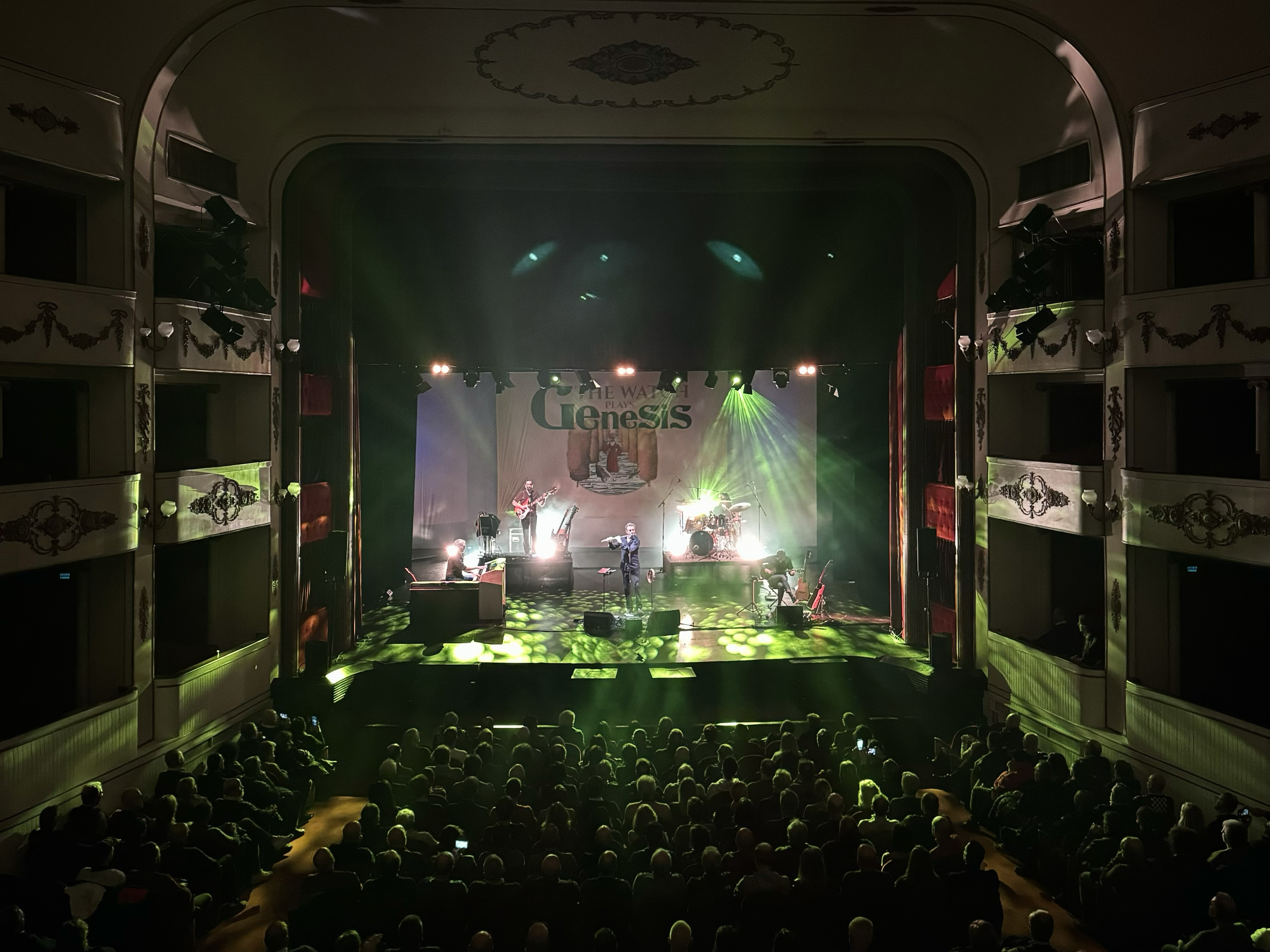
The band performing in 2024

Studio

- Twilight (as The Night Watch) (1997)
- Ghost (2001)
- Vacuum (2004)
- Primitive (2007)
- Planet Earth? (2010)
- Timeless (2011)
- Tracks from the Alps (2014)
- Seven (2017)
- The Art Of Bleeding (2021)

Live

- Live Bootleg (2006)
- Live (2009)
- Green Show 2011 – Official Live Bootleg (2011)
