= Exit Project =

Russian band

EXIT project
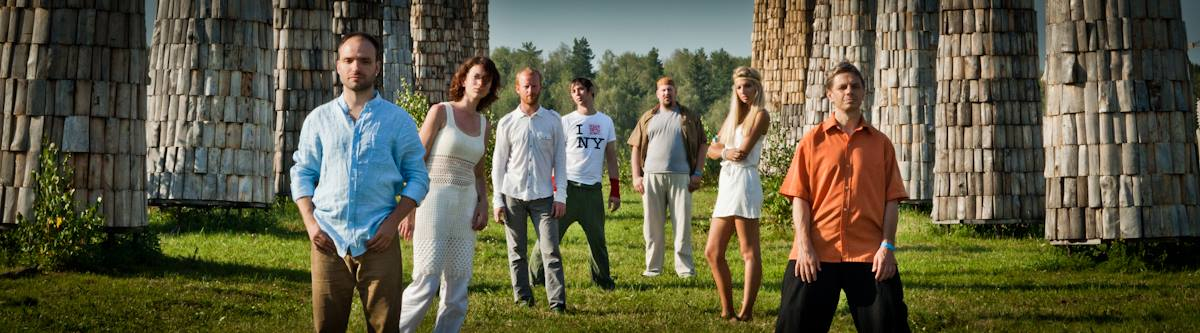

Background information
- Origin: Moscow, Russia
- Genres: Nu jazz, IDM, world, chill-out, downtempo, electronic, art rock, experimental, instrumental, easy listening, electronica, jazz fusion
- Years active: 2001–present
- Members: Oleg Smirnov (Producer, Bass, Guitars, Programming)(2002–present); Vladimir "Big" Glushko (Drums, percussion)(2003–present); Valery "MIF" Mifodovsky (Promotion, Management)(2001–present), John Kukaryamba (percussion, effects, voices) (2006–present), Anastasia Boguslavskaya (alto saxophone) (2007–present), Maria Logofet (violin) (2010–present), Kirill Parenchuk (tabla, soprano sax) (2008–present); Oleg Mariakhin (Saxophones, Trumpet) (2011–present); Nikolay Rubanov (Saxophones)(2011–present); Roman "ROmix" Smirnov (Guitar, Programming)(2001–present)
- Past members: Katerina "Kotya" Zinich (vocals) (2006–2010); Michael "Kotovsky" Finagin (double bass) (2003–2004); Anton Kochurkin (Flute)(2003–2004); Timur Pirogov (bass) (2007–2008); Gregory Sandomirsky (keyboards) (2007–2008); Nikita Filippov (live sound)(2009–2012)
- Website: www.exitproject.org

EXIT project is an instrumental, nu jazz, world, IDM, electronic music, art rock, experimental music, and jazz fusion band from Russia. The band created its own unique style which was labeled as art-fusion.

== The Concept ==
Music aiming people, not the showbiz In terms of management and music distribution EXIT project was aims to promote innovative ways for music distribution and promotion in media, culture and economics. The motto of the project is – "The way out exists" – implies on the one hand, the way out for creative musician, bounded by the limits imposed on music content by commercially driven show business; on the other – the search for alternative way for music distribution. According to Valery Mifodovsky, manager of EXIT project, the goal of management of the project is "popularization and implementation of the concept of innovative music distribution in commercial and non-commercial purposes".

=== The style ===
EXIT project – Paint It Blue Or Say It's Sad

Art-Fusion. The musicians of EXIT project say that they "use all means of expression in music at hand to bring the music in". Virtually every other album is somehow different. Music of EXIT project comprises the elements of Instrumental Music, Nu-Jazz, Chill-out, Downtempo, IDM, Electronic Music, art rock, Experimental Music, and Jazz fusion Musical critic and publisher Vladimir Impaler (InRock Magazine) named this unique blend and stylistic approach as Art-fusion.

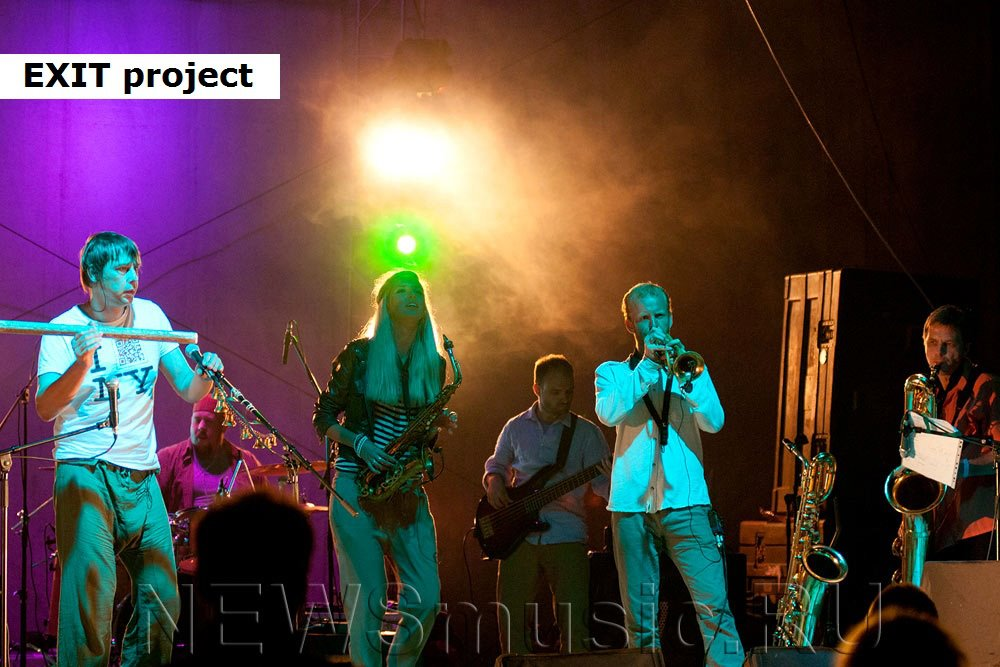
on stage

=== Licensing ===
Music of EXIT project is issued under Creative Commons CC-BY-ND, which allows anyone to use it for any (including commercial) purposes with requirement to credit and cite the author with default prohibition to make any derivative works out of it without the consent of the author. The music is subject for copying, broadcasting and sending/spreading among fans. Licensing and live concerts are perceived as the main source of revenue for an artist.

=== Innovations in music publishing formats ===
EXIT project are innovators in music publishing formats. In October 2012 the band's release LiveSplashes became the first in the world music album to be published in 3plet format. Before that in 2008, EXIT project presented their third album as a multimedia playcast – a synthesis of music, visual art and poetry: thus the music is perceived straight from the screen/speakers as a part of a holistic mix of multimedia art comprising sound + image + word.

Before the debut in 3plet format there was a similar effort: a release for iPhone – Appbum (APPlication alBUM) – a new format of publishing music, a smart combination of iPhone application and music album.

== Live Show program ==
In spring 2010 the band started working on a new live program – Color Splashes – which is a mix of contemporary Nu Jazz and Electronic music. As some critics, as well as the musicians, admit this is the brightest and most colorful live show the band has ever produced. The on-stage line-up consists of Oleg Smirnov (Programming, Bass, Guitars), Vladimir 'BIG' Glushko (drums), Maria Logofet (violin), Anastasia Boguslavskaya (alto sax), Oleg Mariakhin (baritone sax, trumpet), Jon Kukaryamba (percussion, vocals, effects) and band's live soundman – Nikita Filippov. The band is now performing shows in clubs and at festivals. The touring line-up however is usually reduced to 4–5 musicians on stage. The concert debut of this program was released in 2012 as a 4-track concert EP "LiveSplashes" on a CD and in a 3plet format. The release received numerous acknowledgements and reviews around Russia and the USA. The current touring band consists of 5 musicians on stage and a live sound engineer. The current live show program, as well as reviews, videos and music etc. is available at band's official website.

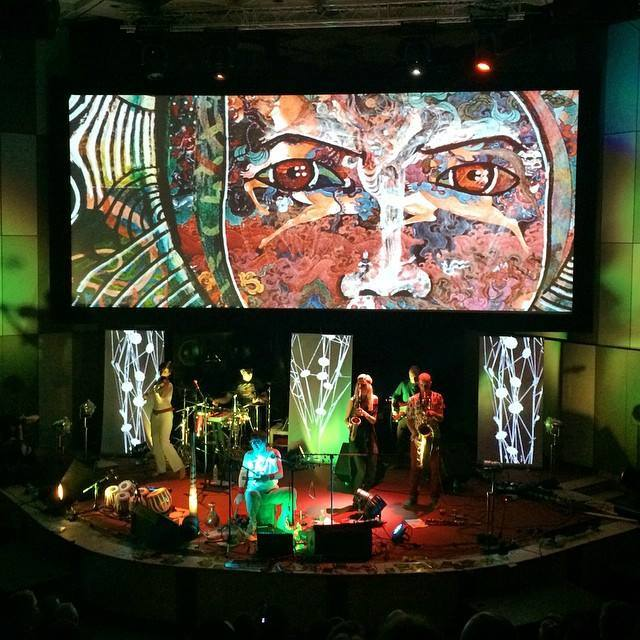
Live at Central House of Artist (Moscow, RU)

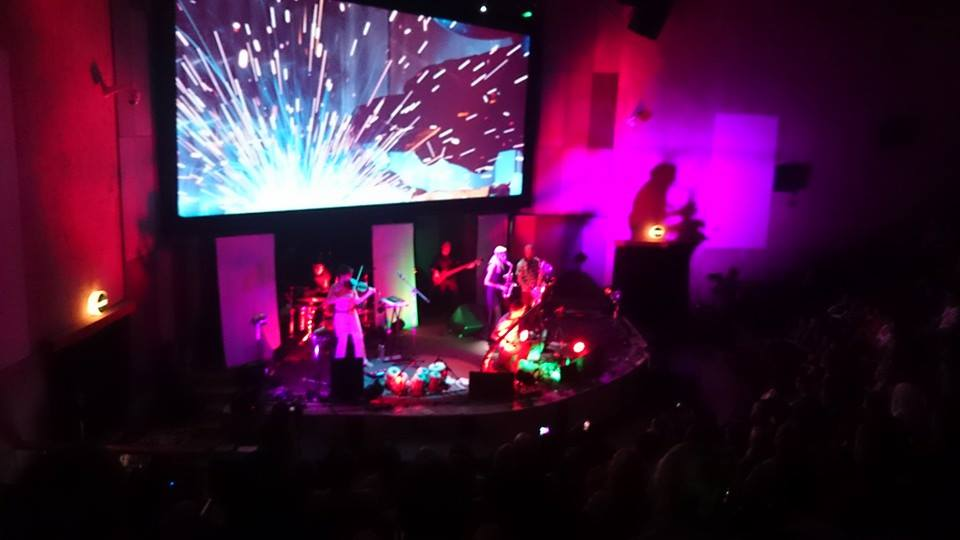
Live at Central House of Artist (Moscow, RU) 2

== History ==
EXIT project was formed in 2001 as an open experimental music community of musicians. "Open" means that any thoughtful and contented musician could join in and contribute. The point was from the start to create a non-commercial music project. The first lineup was: RO-mix (Guitars, Programming, Vocals), Michael (keyboards, vocals, programming). Soon Michael parted, but in a year the band grew in size, when Oleg Smirnov (Guitars, producer), Vladimir "Big" Glushko (Drums), Michael "Kotovsky" Finagin (double bass), Anton Kochurkin (Flute) joined the project.

The first album of the project Live Electricity, was released in 2002 by the label CD Land Records. Several songs from the album entered different compilations. All the sale proceeds from the album were directed to the WWF program (protection of animals). The album received highly positive reviews from the critics, and the band was identified to have its own unique style by the top music critic and journalist Artemy Troitsky.

In 2004 having played some local-scale shows and recorded a demo-release for live show program "Quintet "Michael "Kotovsky" Finagin and Anton Kochurkin left the band.

Meanwhile, the second album of the band, Hack The World, which was mostly a studio work. "Hack the World" was predominantly Electronic music, and was released in 2005 by the declaration FREE!MUSIC 2.1, which allows anyone download and use the music freely. Some of its tracks were used in an audio-story Karandash i samodelkin v Egipte, by Moscow-based art project called Audio-Theater. The album became a success, and the musical journals Salon Audio Video and Avtozvuk released the album in a 50,000 copies edition as an add-on to the journal issue. Songs from the album were also used for the audio-show Space Mowgli based on a story by Strugatsky brothers and in Peoples book based on Yevgeniy Grishkovts's Rivers.

After the success of Hack The World the band started an active touring career in various venues as well as Russian and Ukrainian jazz, alternative and rock festivals, including InProg (2006), Space of Joy (2006), Pustye Holmi (2006), etc. It was in these days when the unique style of the band was named by the critics as art-fusion. On 22 October 2007, the band together with Sergey Letov were the first to perform at the TV show "Brat Jivyom" ("Taking Alive") on the major Russian TV channel O2TV. The official DVD released by the O2TV channel followed this remarkable performance. The following year (2008) this line-up of performers broke up, having naturally completed its agenda.

Meanwhile, in 2007 Ro-mix and producer Oleg Smirnov with some other sidemen recorded EXIT project's third studio album Mystery Journey of Girl with her Death (2007). Being primarily a studio work, the sound of the album was a more distortion oriented and included more traditional music elements and song-line compositions.

In 2008 the new – parallel – line-up was formed consisting of Oleg Smirnov, "Ro-mix" and world music and jazz virtuoso Kirill Parenchuk playing soprano sax and Indian percussion instrument tabla. In 2010 the band released the amazing concert album featuring collaboration with avant-garde saxophonist Sergey Letov – "Live at Golden Mask" recorded live in 2007.

In 2012 the concert debut of live program was released in 2012 as a 5-track concert EP "LiveSplashes" on a CD and became the first music album to be released in a 3plet format. The release received numerous acknowledgements and reviews around Russia and the USA.

Later in 2012 the band's producer, bandleader and bassist Oleg Smirnov released a studio multimedia project in collaboration with multi-instrumentalist Kirill Parnchuk. The multi-media album "Son Cherished Most" is a unity of music, visual arts and text citations as well as a 10-minute documentary film revealing the concept and the process of creation.

The latest official release of the band is The Best 20.20 and is an anniversary album highlighting the twentieth year in the band's history. The release is available in all major digital stores. The album got high critical acclaim in the music media.

=== Present members ===
- Oleg Smirnov (Bandleader, Producer, Guitar, Bass, Programming) (2002–present)
- Vladimir «Big» Glushko (Drums, percussion)(2003–present)
- Valery «MIF» Mifodovsky (Promotion, Management)(2001–present),
- John Kukaryamba (percussion, effects, voices) (2006–present),
- Anastasia Boguslavskaya (alto saxophone) (2007–present),
- Maria Logofet (violin) (2010–present),
- Oleg Mariakhin (saxophones, trumpet) (2012–present),
- Roman «RO-mix» (Guitar, Programming)(2001–present)
- Kirill Parenchuk (tabla, soprano sax) (2008–present)

=== Past members ===
- Katerina «Kotya» Zinich (vocals) (2006–2010)
- Michael «Kotovsky» Finagin (double bass) (2003–2004)
- Anton Kochurkin (Flute) (2003–2004)
- Timur pirogov (bass) (2007–2008)
- Gregory Sandomirsky (keys) (2007–2008)

== Discography ==
=== Studio albums ===
- Live Electricity (2002, CD Land Records)
- Hack the World (CD 2005, available in digital online stores as well as for free download, broadcast and distribution under Creative Commons)
- Mystery Journey of Girl with her Death (CD 2007, Digital, available in digital online stores as well as for free download, broadcast and distribution under Creative Commons)
- Shanti Place (Digital 2010, available in digital online stores as well as for free download, broadcast and distribution under Creative Commons)
- Son Cherished Most by Oleg Smirnov & Kirill Parenchuk (CD, Digital 2012, available in digital online stores as well as for free download, broadcast and distribution under Creative Commons)
- Color Splashes (CD 2015, available in digital online stores as well as for free download, broadcast and distribution under Creative Commons)
- The Past is the Future (Digital 2014, available in digital online stores as well as for free download, broadcast and distribution under Creative Commons)
- 20.20 (Digital 2020, available in digital online stores as well as for free download, broadcast and distribution under Creative Commons)

=== Concert albums ===
- Live at Golden Mask (2007), at concert at Golden Mask festival feat. Sergey Letov (sax)
- LiveSplashes (2011), live release featuring 4 tracks of 'Color Splashes' program

=== Compilations and other releases ===
- EXIT project – demo 2001.
- Play magazine – № 3 2002 (Russian edition)
- Propaganda − 2 (CD, compilation) 2002
- OpenMusic Compilation (CD 2002), Alt Linux.
- Propaganda − 3 (CD, compilation) 2003
- Music for designers – Compilation (CD, 2003) Indexdesign
- Quintet (demo 2004, available for free download, broadcast and distribution under Creative Commons)
- Play magazine – "replay" № 12 2004 (CD compilation)
- Free!Music Compilation (CD, mp3 compilation), Alt Linux.
- CD: EXIT project «Hack the World» AutoZvuk magazine №2/2006, Salon Audio & Video magazine №2/2006
- Music for the Brains – 3: «Submerging» AutoZvuk magazine №4/2006, Salon Audio & Video magazine №4/2006 CD SAV 06051
- EXIT project «Mystery Journey of Girl With Her Death» (DVD edition to Mobi magazine №12 2007)
- "FREE!Music compilation – Music for the People" (DVD edition to Mobi magazine №12 2007)
- CD Free!Music AutoZvuk magazine (№1 01.2007), Salon Audio & Video magazine (№1 01.2007)
- CD StereoSummer Compilation of Russian electronic music. Avtozvuk magazine (№8 08.2007), Salon Audio Video magazine (№8 08.2007).
- «Ad Astra». Raussian <Cosmic> music. (AutoZvuk magazine №4 01.2007, Salon Audio & Video magazine №4 04.2007)
- GoldenMask.Club – compilation – Zibaldone (2007, BAd TaStE, btp27)
- New year streamer (AutoZvuk magazine (№1 01.2008), Salon Audio & Video magazine №1 01.2008)
- CD Music of Blogosphere AutoZvuk magazine (№7 07/2008), Salon Audio & Video magazine №7 07/2008
- "Four Seasons – Russian Winter" – third compilation of Russian СhillOut-music – 2009 (CD, compilation) Pitch Music Publishing & Fusion label
- Gorchitza RMXS 2009 Lavina Music (Ukraine)
- "Four Seasons – Russian Autumn" 2009 (CD, compilation)
- Tunguska Chillout Grooves vol. 2 2009 (CD, compilation)
- Tunguska Electronic Music Society – Tunguska Chillout Grooves vol. 3 (Lilith & Selena) 2009 (digital, compilation)
- Tunguska Electronic Music Society – Tunguska Chillout Grooves vol. 4 2009 (digital, compilation)
- Tunguska Electronic Music Society – Ellipsis: Tunguska.Shaman.Vimana. 2010 (digital, compilation)
- Tunguska Electronic Music Society – Ellipsis II_ Tunguska.Shaman.Vimana. vol.2 (digital, compilation)
- Tunguska Electronic Music Society – Craters_ Cheko (digital, compilation)
- Tunguska Electronic Music Society – Craters_ Romeiko (digital, compilation)
- Tunguska Electronic Music Society – Decade for Decide (Best of 2007–2017) (digital, compilation)
- Tunguska Electronic Music Society – Siberian Jungle Vol1 (digital, compilation)
- Tunguska Electronic Music Society – Tunguska Artefacts_ Autumn Tram (digital, compilation)
- Tunguska Electronic Music Society – Tunguska Artefacts_ Orange Tram (digital, compilation)
- Tunguska Electronic Music Society – Tunguska Artefacts_ Spring Bloom (digital, compilation)
- Tunguska Electronic Music Society – Tunguska Chillout Grooves vol.7 (digital, compilation)
- Tunguska Electronic Music Society – Tunguska Chillout Grooves X (digital, compilation)
- EXIT project – Mystery Journey of Girl with her Death (DVD edition for Mobi magazine) № 84; Aug 2010
- EXIT project «Paper Release». CD for paper Ballet promo (International Paper, 2010)
- Tunguska – Favorite (DVD edition for Mobi magazine) № 86; Oct. 2010
- First Cosmic (digital, compilation) (2016)
- Greenpeace. World Heritage (2014) (digital, compilation)

LIST OF FESTIVALS:

Island of Light (2006)

In Prog (2006)

Space of Joy (2006),

Golden Mask Club (2007)

Noumen Art (2008)

Long Arms 5 (2008)

Ethnolife (2008);

Wild Mint (2009); (Oleg Smirnov)

Pustye Holmi (2006, 2007, 2008, 2010, 2011, 2012)

Kazantip (2011)

Ethno Planeta (2012)

Archstoyanie (2010, 2012)

Russian-German Festival "On Rozhdenstvensky Side" (2013)

WaFest (2012, 2013)

Troitza: All Live (2014)

JetLag (2017) (Oleg Smirnov)

THE LIST OF SOME PRINT (HARD-COPY) MUSIC MAGAZINES WHERE YOU CAN FIND REVIEWS OF THE EXIT PROJECT ALBUMS:

Billboard (#4 2008; #6 2010)

InRock (#17-2005; #28-2008; #39-2009; #49-2011; #58-2013)

Play (#6-2002; #7-2002; #11-2006)

Salon Audio&Video (#2-2006; #4-2007; #1-2008)

AutoZvuk (#2-2006; #1-2007; #8-2007; #7-2008)

Fuzz (#10-2007)

== Trivia ==
- The overall total number of copies of various CDs featuring EXIT project is above 1,000,000 copies
- Music by EXIT project has many times been used in WWF videos. and Greenpeace videos
- EXIT project was the first band to support free music distribution movement – Free!Music.
- Album Mystery Journey of Girl with her Death was the first Russian music album to be published under Creative Commons
- Album "LiveSplashes" was the first music album ever to be released in innovative digital publishing format "3PLET"
- The EXIT project music was used in TV series "Ticket to the Bolshoy" by major Russian federal TV channel "Rossiya Kultura"
- Roman "RO-mix" and Valery "MIF" Mifodovsky are among the founders of the non-profit organization "FREE!MUSIC".
- In 2005 PepsiCo released a CD which included a few of the songs from Hack The World in remixed versions. The band didn't like the remixes so much that they asked their name wouldn't be mentioned on the CD.
- EXIT project was the second in the world to have released their album on a flash memory stick USB Flash (March 2006)
- The band doesn't fight piracy. Moreover, – it supports innovative forms of distribution: the exclusive CD edition of band's drummer Vladimir "BIG" Glushko personal EXIT has one more – blank CD suggesting to make a copy.
