= The Weirding =

Studio album by Astra
- Released: May 25, 2009
- Genre: Progressive rock, psychedelic rock
- Length: 78:45
- Label: Rise Above
- Producer: Astra

Astra chronology
The Weirding (2009)	The Black Chord (2012)

Professional ratings
Review scores
Source	Rating
Allmusic	3.5/5 stars
Prog Archives	4/5 stars
Sputnikmusic	3.5/5 stars

The Weirding is an album by American progressive rock band Astra. It was their debut album, released in the United Kingdom on May 25, 2009, and on June 23 of that year in the United States. It was released on the independent label Rise Above Records. The album was released and received overall positive reviews, noting that the music was very similar to that of 1970s progressive rock bands like Pink Floyd and Yes, along with the space-rock outfit Hawkwind. Mojo said "The quintet's lengthy gestation period has resulted in a sublime debut that evokes various '70s colossi - panoramic Pink Floyd, mellotron-era King Crimson, Black Sabbath in philosophical mode - without ever stooping to pastiche".

The album was released as both a compact disc and a double LP set. The latter comes with a bonus 7" single disc containing demos of two older, unreleased songs: "Winter Witch" and "Cosmic Wind".

== The Weirding/Cocoon Synchronicity ==
Shortly after The Weirding's release in 2009, rumors have been circulated on the Internet stating that The Weirding was written as a soundtrack for the 1985 science fiction film Cocoon. Observers playing the film and the album simultaneously have reported apparent synchronicities.

== Track listing ==
No.	Title	Length
1.	"The Rising of the Black Sun"	5:43
2.	"The Weirding"	15:27
3.	"Silent Sleep"	10:41
4.	"The River Under"	8:40
5.	"Ouroboros"	17:24
6.	"Broken Glass"	3:44
7.	"The Dawning of Ophiuchus"	5:29
8.	"Beyond to Slight the Maze"	11:37

=== Bonus 7" single ===
No.	Title	Length
1.	"Winter Witch (Demo)"
2.	"Cosmic Wind (Demo)"

== Personnel ==
- Richard Vaughan – vocals, guitars, Mellotron, ARP Odyssey Synthesizer, Echoplex
- Conor Riley – vocals, guitars, Mellotron, ARP Odyssey Synthesizer, piano, keyboards
- Brian Ellis – guitars, Moog synthesizer
- Stuart Sclater – bass
- David Hurley – drums, percussion, flute

== Production ==
- Arranged & Produced by Astra
- Engineered by Astra & James Mullen
- Mastered by Noel Summerville
- Album sleeve art, design & illustration by Arik "Moonhawk" Roper
