= Divinity Destroyed =

American progressive metal band

- Origin: Toms River, New Jersey, United States
- Genres: Progressive metal
- Years active: 1999–
- Label: Screaming Ferret Wreckords
- Past members: Jonathan Kilburn; Mark Ward; Tom Ward; Jim Cowen; Rick Flanegan; Joe Grinnelli; Jonny Heerema; Rob Proft; Emily Heerema; Paul Gaita; Dan Leonard

Divinity Destroyed was an American progressive metal band, formed in 1999 and based in central New Jersey. The band's music incorporating everything from Japanese folk to progressive rock to videogame scores.

Divinity Destroyed released a number of independent discs and has opened for international acts such as the Misfits, Overkill, Balzac, and Cradle of Filth. In the Summer of 2005, they competed for the PNC Bank Arts Center stop of the Gigantour 2005, sharing the crowd with the likes of Megadeth, Fear Factory and Dillinger Escape Plan. The band was awarded the opening slot after winning a "battle of the bands" run by WRAT 95.9 FM, a local rock station. Divinity has received several positive write-ups in magazines like Metal Maniacs, Unrestrained, the Aquarian, and even two articles in Billboard magazine. Their 2003 release Eden In Ashes was picked up for national distribution and re-released by Screaming Ferret Wreckords in early 2005.

The band was slated to perform at a charity show on May 19, 2006, hosted by St. Mary's Parish in Stafford Township, New Jersey, and benefitting cerebral palsy and the Sunshine Foundation. With a week to go before the benefit, church leaders canceled the show, specifically citing the band's name and website as factors. The band and the show's organizers had put together a petition to keep the benefit concert alive for a different time and location.

On July 30, 2007, Divinity Destroyed announced that their 2005 release, The Plague, was available for download on iTunes.

October 16, 2007 saw the release of another EP, Death or Glory recorded at Entrolab in Manchester, NJ. Copies of the EP are available from the band's official website.

On March 15, 2008, Divinity Destroyed dismissed their drummer, Dan Leonard.

On January 10, 2009, Divinity Destroyed played their first show with new drummer Joe Grinnelli, who became the official drummer of the band.

The band frequently performed concerts with Laptop Rockers and End of an Era.

On November 18, Divinity Destroyed announced they would play their farewell show on December 19, Dan Leonard will be playing drums with the band for this last show. However, the show was postponed twice due to weather and was instead performed on May 22, 2010.

In November 2013 The Divinity Destroyed Facebook page hinted at the band producing some new music. A picture of a makeshift recording studio in one of the band members house was later published. The album, Nova was released in December, 2013.

== Discography ==
- 4 song demo (2000) (independent)
- Nocturnal Dawn (2000) (independent)
- Divinity Destroyed (EP) (2003) (independent)
- Eden in Ashes (2003) (independent) / (2005) (Screaming Ferret/Escapi)
- The Plague (EP) (2005)
- Death or Glory (EP) (2007)
- Nova (2013)
