= Sylvan (band) =

German progressive rock band

- Origin: Hamburg, Germany
- Genres: Progressive rock, neo-progressive rock, symphonic rock
- Years active: 1990–present
- Label: Sylvan Music
- Members: Volker Söhl; Matthias Harder; Marco Glühmann; Sebastian Harnack
- Past members: Kay Söhl; Marko Heisig; Matthias Koops; Jan Petersen
- Website: www.sylvan.de

Sylvan is a German progressive rock band.

== History ==
Kay Söhl and keyboardists Volker Söhl and Matthias Harder founded the band Temporal Temptation in 1990. That summer, the eventual founders of Sylvan first played live — mostly hard rock sung in German, with only a little progressive rock.

In Autumn 1990, the band changed its name to Chameleon as a symbol of changeability. The album artwork resembled early Marillion covers and it was never issued. In Summer 1991, Marko Heisig joined Chameleon as the lead singer and bassist. Between 1992 and 1994, their music turned gloomy and aggressive. In 1992, the first official demo tape of Chameleon was released. With Matthias Koops as lead singer, the second official demo tape was recorded. The title was Slaves and its track list was Time, Slaves, Mirror of a Lifetime, and Childhood Dreams.

In 1995, guest musician Marco Glühmann joined the band, and a third and final demo tape was recorded. The track list was Beren and Luthien, Golden Cage, and Outro. All of these songs later appeared on the Deliverance album in some way.

In 1997 the last live concert took place under the name Chameleon. The band then changed its name to Sylvan. Deliverance was recorded in 1998 and a second CD, Encounters, was released in 2000.

Sylvan had utilized several bassists, but, in Spring 2000, Sebastian Harnack filled the role permanently. After releasing Encounters, the band toured in Germany and at several festivals in Europe and even in Mexico. Another highlight was the performance of Encounters / Das Rockballet together with the "New Dance Project". In October 2002, Sylvan released a third album, Artificial Paradise.

Sylvan's fourth album, X-Rayed, sounds rougher and darker, another concept album, with each song telling a story of people coping with an emotional situation. The 2004 tour throughout Germany and Europe featured an appearance at the Rites of Spring Festival in Pennsylvania, USA, and the support of Marillion in Cologne.

Sylvan then produced two albums, both released in April 2006. Posthumous Silence tells of a father who reads the diary of his apparently dead daughter and learns of her desperation. Presets had shorter and catchier songs with the intention to make Sylvan's music known to a wider range of rock fans.

Shortly after finishing this work, founder and guitarist Kay Söhl left the band. He was replaced at the end of 2007 by Jan Petersen, who had been a guest guitarist during the Posthumous Silence live show.

Their 2021 release, and tenth album, One to Zero was considered a return to form by prog critics. The album was conceptual and examined the topic of artificial intelligence, considering what a new intelligence might consider of humanity and its development.

== Band members ==
Current members

- Volker Söhl - keyboards (1990–present)
- Matthias Harder - drums (1990–present)
- Marco Glühmann - vocals (1995–present)
- Sebastian Harnack - bass (2000–present)

Former members

- Kay Söhl - guitar (1990–2007)
- Marko Heisig - vocals (1991)
- Matthias Koops - vocals (1992)
- Jan Petersen - guitar (2007–2013)

== Discography ==
Albums

- Deliverance (1999)
- Encounters (2000)
- Artificial Paradise (2002)
- X-Rayed (2004)
- Posthumous Silence (2006)
- Presets (2007)
- Force of Gravity (2009)
- Sceneries (2012)
- Home (2015)
- One to Zero (2021)

Live

- Posthumous Silence - The Show (DVD, 2008)
- Leaving Backstage (Album, 2008)
- Back to Live (DVD and album, 2024)
