= One Night On Fire =

One Night on Fire
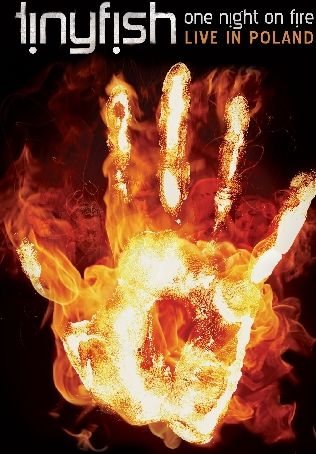

Live album by Tinyfish
- Released: 11 August 2009
- Genre: Progressive rock
- Label: Metal Mind
- Producer: Tinyfish; Mixed by Rob Aubrey

Tinyfish chronology
Curious Things (2006)	One Night on Fire (2009)	The Big Red Spark (2010)

Professional ratings
Review scores
Source	Rating
Green Man Music	

One Night on Fire is a DVD and live album by the English progressive rock band Tinyfish. It was recorded during the band's performance at the Wyspianski Theatre, Katowice, Poland on 16 February 2009.

== DVD Track listing ==
1. "Honey Nut Loops"
2. "Motorville"
3. "The Big Red Spark"
4. "Build Your Own Enemy"
5. "Pagodas"
6. "Wide Awake at Midnight"
7. "Eat The Ashes"
8. "The Sarcasm Never Stops"
9. "Ride"
10. "Driving All Night"
11. "Too High For Low Company"
12. "Cinnamon"
13. "Fly Like A Bird"
14. "Nine Months on Fire"
15. "All Hands Lost (part 1)"
16. "Tinyfish"
17. "All Hands Lost (part 2)"

== CD Track listing ==
1. "Honey Nut Loops"
2. "Motorville"
3. "The Big Red Spark"
4. "Build Your Own Enemy"
5. "Pagodas"
6. "Wide Awake at Midnight"
7. "The Sarcasm Never Stops"
8. "Ride"
9. "Driving All Night"
10. "Too High For Low Company"
11. "Cinnamon"
12. "Fly Like A Bird"
13. "Nine Months on Fire"
14. "All Hands Lost (part 1)"
15. "Tinyfish"
16. "All Hands Lost (part 2)"

== Personnel ==
- Simon Godfrey – Lead vocals, guitars, guitar synthesizer
- Jim Sanders – Guitars, backing vocals
- Paul Worwood – Bass guitar
- Robert Ramsay – Spoken word
- Leon Camfield – Drums, percussion, samples, backing vocals
