= Tinyfish =

English progressive rock band

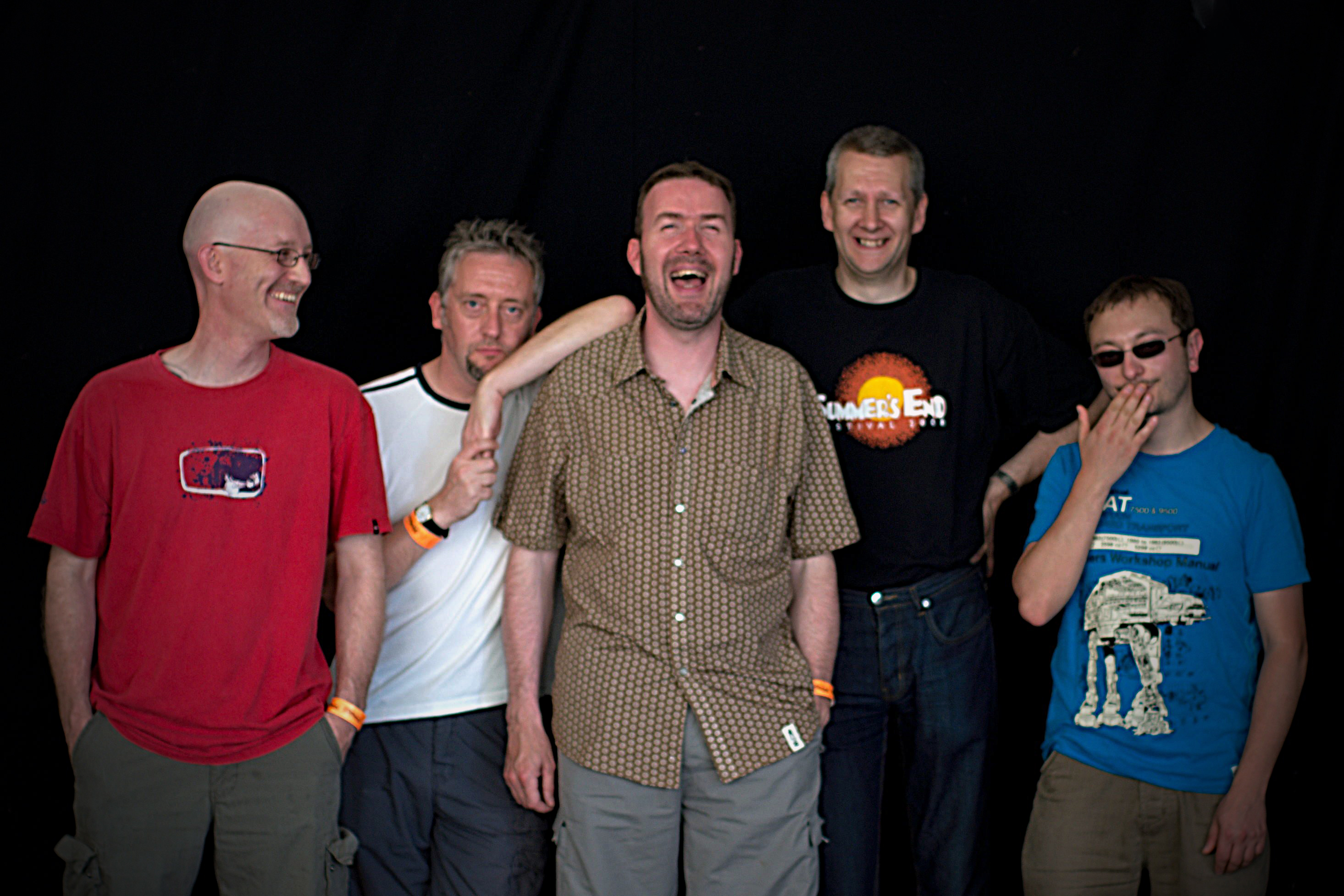
- Tinyfish in 2009 (l-r) Jim Sanders, Paul Worwood, Simon Godfrey, Robert Ramsay, Leon Camfield

Background information
- Origin: England
- Genres: progressive rock
- Years active: 2004-present
- Labels: Lazy Gun Records; Festival Music (F2); Metal Mind Productions
- Members: Simon Godfrey; Jim Sanders; Paul Worwood; Rob Ramsay; Leon Camfield
- Website: tinyfish.org

Tinyfish is an English progressive rock band, founded in 2004. The band members are Simon Godfrey (lead vocal, guitar), Jim Sanders (lead guitar, backing vocals), Paul Worwood (bass), Robert Ramsay (spoken word, harmonica) and Leon Camfield (drums, backing vocals).

== Band history ==
=== Formation ===
Tinyfish was formed in September 2004. Simon Godfrey, Jim Sanders and Paul Worwood were all members of Freefall, described by Simon as "our first prog band" , and which also featured Simon's brother Jem Godfrey (now of Frost*) on keyboards. After Freefall split in the early nineties Simon played drums in a number of bands while developing his songwriting talents in the guise of Men Are Dead (with Robert and Paul) and playing the open mike spots of London as Simon Walsh.

=== First album ===
The band released their eponymous debut album in 2006 to critical acclaim. Geoff Barton gave the album 8/10 in Classic Rock Magazine , and the magazine ranked it 15 in the best albums of the year . The songs on the album are shorter than is often the case for progressive rock (with the exception of the 'mini-epic' All Hands Lost) with an emphasis on tightly-written songs rather than long, self-indulgent solos and unorthodox time signatures. The album features no keyboards, which is again unusual for the genre, instead using guitar synthesizers to produce musical textures. There are three spoken-word tracks performed by Rob Ramsay, who is also the principal song lyricist for the band.

=== Live performance ===
Tinyfish played several shows throughout 2007 and 2008 in support of the album, including three shows at the Peel 'House Of Progression' in Kingston upon Thames, and at the 2007 Summer's End progressive rock festival. The core line-up was supplemented by drummer Leon Camfield when playing full electric band shows, although the band also performed - and occasionally still does perform - as a four-piece acoustic line-up.

=== Curious Things ===
In early 2009 Tinyfish released a mini-album, Curious Things, comprising a number of 'rarities' written over the previous few years, and produced by Jem Godfrey.

=== One Night On Fire ===
Later in 2009 the band released a DVD and live album, One Night On Fire (on the Metal Mind label), recorded at a performance at the Wyspianski Theatre, Katowice, Poland. The DVD contains performances of songs from both of the previous releases together with material from the yet-to-be-released Big Red Spark. Rob's spoken-word performances are a particular highlight, accompanied for the first time by the use of costumes to enhance theatricality. The DVD garnered more positive reviews .

=== The Big Red Spark ===
On 19 April 2010 the band announced that their second full-length album, The Big Red Spark, would be released by F2 Records in September 2010. After a long period of recording the album was mixed and mastered in June 2010 at Wolf Studios by Dominique Brethes, with Mike Varty as co-producer. The album was publicly available for the first time at a launch concert on 10 September 2010 at The Luminaire in North London, and was officially launched on 13 September 2010, to critical acclaim, Classic Rock magazine awarding it 9 out of 10 stars.

=== Summer's End 2010 ===
On 8 October 2010 Tinyfish once again played at the Summer's End festival. It was after this concert that Leon Camfield joined the band as a full member, having previously played drums for live dates only. On 13 October the band announced that "Leon Camfield is now a full time member of Tinyfish and...he will be contributing not only drums but will become part of the writing team for the next album".

=== RoSfest 2011 ===
Tinyfish played the Rites of Spring Festival RoSfest in Gettysburg, USA in May 2011. This show (along with a short tour of the UK) completed their promotion of the Big Red Spark album.

=== Celebr8 2012 and retirement from live performance ===
The band played at the inaugural Celebr8 progressive rock festival on 8 July 2012 at the Hippodrome, Kingston upon Thames. This is likely to be their last full electric show for the foreseeable future, as on 12 May 2012 an announcement was made that due to the onset of tinnitus Simon Godfrey would no longer be able to perform 'at volume'. The band still exists as a recording entity and plans to make an announcement concerning its future in early 2013.

== Discography ==
Studio albums

- Tinyfish (2006; Lazy Gun Records)
- Curious Things (2009; Lazy Gun Records / Festival Music)
- The Big Red Spark (2010; Festival Music)

Live albums

- One Night on Fire (2009; Metal Mind Productions)

== Line-up ==
=== Current members ===
- Simon Godfrey (vocals, guitars, guitar synthesizer and drums)
- Jim Sanders (guitars, guitar synthesizer and backing vocals)
- Paul Worwood (bass)
- Rob Ramsay (spoken word, harmonica)
- Leon Camfield (drums, percussion, backing vocals)
