= Little Tragedies (rock group) =

Russian musical group

- Origin: Kursk, Russia
- Genres: Progressive rock art rock symphonic rock
- Years active: 1994–present
- Labels: Boheme Music (2000); Musea (2005, 2009-2014); MALS (2006-2008); Macalla records (2019-present)
- Members: Gennady Ilyin – composer, keyboards, vocals (1994-present); Oleg Babynin – bass guitar(1994-present); Yuri Skripkin – drums (1994-present); Alexander Malakhovsky – guitar (2000-present); Aleksey Bildin – saxophone (2000-present)
- Website: Littletragedies.com

Little Tragedies (Russian: Маленькие Трагедии-Malenkiye Tragediyi) are a Russian language progressive rock, art rock and symphonic rock band from Russia. Arguably the most important progressive rock band in Russia.

== Style ==
The band described its style as "a battery of keyboards - drums - bass; hard rhythm section support and soloing keyboards". Little Tragedies has their very own style, influenced by classical music and heavy art rock. The music of Little Tragedies is very melodic and always features a keyboard solo with an improvisation accent. The band are one of the only progressive rock bands in Russia using Moog and Hammond keyboards. Most of the songs of the band are based on known Russian poets, especially Nikolai Gumilev. The name of the group itself is taken from a piece by Alexander Pushkin.

Due to the fact Ilyin moved to live in Germany, he sends the music scores to the band members via email, and after they learn it he arrives to Kursk for the rehearsals and recordings.

== History ==
Little Tragedies were founded in 1994 by the graduate of St. Petersburg Conservatory, composer Gennady Ilyin, in the city of Kursk, after previously performing with a band called Paradox. The name was taken from a play by Alexander Pushkin. The group's first recording, 1, was never recorded as an album. It exists only on an amateur videotape made from the group's only concert at that moment. Since 1995 the band was a trio: Gennady Ilyin - keyboards; Yuri Skripkin - drums; Oleg Babynin - bass. With such a line-up the group played till 2000. After visiting Paris, Gennady Ilyin started working on the Paris Symphony.

1997 - the beginning of 1998. It took G. Ilyin a month to compose a fairytale ballet "Magic Shop" about a little girl's Christmas adventures. He practiced it with the band and it was performed on the stage only two and a half years later. In the year 2000, Little Tragedies released their first two albums, The Sun of Spirit and Porcelain Pavilion, on the record label Boheme Music. The albums were recorded by Ilyin in 1998–1999, with the help of musicians Igor Mihel (guitar) and Yevgeniy Shukin (audio engineering). Though originally recorded as Gennady Ilyin's solo albums, Ilyin decided to release the albums under the Little Tragedies name.

In summer 2000, Alexander Malakhovsky (guitar) and Aleksey Bildin (saxophone) joined the original trio (Ilyin, Skripkin and Babynin). With the new line-up, in 2001 the group created the last album of the trilogy to the poems of N. Gumilev, Return (the first were The Sun of Spirit and Porcelain Pavilion). The album was first released by the French label Musea Records. At the same time the band signed with the record label MALS, the biggest progressive music label in Russia, and the album also became available for the Russian public.

In 2003 the band released their fourth album, New Faust, a double concept album which was written back in 1997–98.

In 2006 the band released a fifth album, The Sixth Sense. In the same year the band opened the second day of the InProg 2006 festival. In 2007 the band released the first and later the second part of their sixth album based on Russian translations to Chinese poetry, Chinese Songs, with the main theme of the album being the relationship between man and nature.

In 2006 an event happened which attracted the media attention when the instruments of the band were stolen from their rehearsal studio. The thief was caught and the instruments were returned to the band.

In August 2008 the band recorded an instrumental Christmas album called The Magic Shop, which was written ten years before. It was released in November 2009 as a free download on the band's web-site as a Christmas gift for the fans. In 2009 the band finished recording a new album called Obsessed.

In 2014 Little Tragedies held a special performance in the Kursk Philharmonic Hall to celebrate twenty years since the founding of the band. It was planned show would be later released on a double DVD. It was the first live concert held by the band since 2006. The concert was the band's first live performance in seven years, mostly due to the fact the lead singer had moved to Germany, whilst the rest remained in Kursk

In 2019, the band released Paradise behind the Stove with a different record label, Macalla records. The band celebrated the release of the new album with a show commemorating their 25's anniversary.

== Discography ==
=== Studio albums ===
- The Sun of Spirit – Солнце Духа (2000, Boheme Music) (2009, re-release, MALS) •
- Porcelain Pavilion – Фарфоровый павильон (2000, Boheme Music) (2009, re-release, MALS) •
- Return – Возвращение (2005, Musea Records) (2006, re-release, MALS)
- New Faust – Новый Фауст (2006, MALS, Double Album)
- The Sixth Sense – Шестое чувство (2006, MALS)
- Chinese Songs – Китайские песни (2007, MALS, Double Album)
- Cross – Крест (2008, MALS)
- Paris Symphony – Парижская симфония (2009, Musea Records)
- The Magic Shop – Волшебная лавка (2009, released as a free download on the internet) (2014, re-release, Musea Records)
- Obsessed – Одержимый (2011, Musea Records)
- At Nights – По ночам (2014, Musea Records)
- Paradise behind the Stove - Запечный рай (2019, Macalla records)

• Re-released in 2009 as Gennady Ilyin's solo albums by MALS.
