= Before Became After =

Studio album by Proto-Kaw
- Released: 5 April 2004
- Recorded: 2003–2004
- Genre: Progressive rock
- Length: 65:34
- Label: InsideOut
- Producer: Kerry Livgren

Proto-Kaw chronology
| Early Recordings from Kansas 1971-1973 (2004) | Before Became After (2004) | The Wait of Glory (2006) |

Before Became After is a reunion album from the original Kansas II lineup, under their new name of Proto-Kaw. The Special Edition contains three bonus tracks - one new original song, a live version of "Belexes", plus a “single” version of “Words of Honor”. It also includes an informative interview CD-ROM video about the group.

"Greenburg, Glickstein, Charles, David, Smith and Jones" is a cover of a song by The Cryan' Shames from their 1968 album Synthesis.

== Track listing ==
1. "Alt. More Worlds than Known" – 7:28
2. "Words of Honor" – 4:28
3. "Leaven" – 8:26
4. "Axolotl" – 6:04
5. "Quantum Leapfrog" – 5:42
6. "Greenburg, Glickstein, Charles, David, Smith and Jones" (Isaac Guillory, Jim Fairs) – 3:05
7. "Gloriana" – 9:07
8. "Occasion of Your Honest Dreaming" – 3:38
9. "Heavenly Man" – 5:53
10. "Theophany" – 11:43
11. "Belexes" (live) – 8:08
12. "It Moves You" – 4:26
13. "Words of Honor" (single edit) – 3:18

== Personnel ==
Proto-Kaw

- Lynn Meredith - vocals, narration
- John Bolton - saxophones, flute
- Kerry Livgren - guitars, backing vocals, piano, keyboards, percussion, engineer
- Dan Wright - organ, backing vocals, keyboards, percussion
- Craig Kew - bass, backing vocals
- Brad Schulz - drums

Additional musicians

- Jake Livgren - backing vocals
- Rod Mikinski - bass on "Axolotl"
- Eva Peterson - backing vocals on "It Moves You"

Packaging team

- Ken Westphal - design, illustrations
- Thomas Ewerhard - design
- Kerrick James - original photography
- Barak Hill - web design

== Release details ==
- 2005, USA, InsideOut Music SPV08760650, Release date 5 April 2005, CD
- 2005, USA, InsideOut Music SPV08560652, Release date 5 April 2005, CD Special edition
