= Astra (band) =

Rock band from San Diego

- Also known as: Silver Sunshine (2001-2006)
- Origin: San Diego, California, United States
- Genres: Progressive rock, psychedelic rock, space rock
- Years active: 2001–present
- Labels: Rise Above Records; Metal Blade Records
- Members: Richard Vaughan; Conor Riley; Stuart Sclater; Brian Ellis
- Past members: Iain Sclater; David Hurley; Paul Marrone
- Website: www.astratheband.com

Astra is a rock band from San Diego, California. Their sound is in the style of the 1970s progressive rock and psychedelic rock, and includes a variety of synthesizers, mellotron and long jams.

== History ==
Astra was formed in San Diego in 2001 by Richard Vaughan (vocals, guitars, keyboards), Conor Riley (vocals, guitars, keyboards), and brothers Iain (drums, percussion) and Stuart Sclater (bass guitar) under the name 'Silver Sunshine'. Following the departure of Iain Sclater and the subsequent recruitment of guitarist Brian Ellis and drummer David Hurley to the line-up, the band underwent its name change to Astra. This line-up of the band went on to produce the band's first two albums, 2009's The Weirding and 2012's The Black Chord, both of which were released on Rise Above Records in the UK and on Metal Blade Records in the USA. A further line-up change occurred in 2013 with David Hurley departing to be replaced on drums by Radio Moscow drummer Paul Marrone. Due to some members focusing on other musical projects and some members relocating across the U.S., Astra is currently on an indefinite hiatus.

== Personnel ==
Current members

- Richard Vaughan – vocals, guitars, keyboards (2001–present)
- Conor Riley – vocals, guitars, keyboards (2001–present)
- Stuart Sclater – bass guitar (2001–present)
- Brian Ellis – guitars, moog synthesizer (2006–present)

Past members

- Iain Sclater - drums, percussion (2001–2006)
- David Hurley – drums, percussion, flute (2006–2013)
- Paul Marrone – drums, percussion (2013–2016)

== Discography ==
=== Albums ===
- The Weirding (2009)
- The Black Chord (2012)
