= Tinyfish (album) =

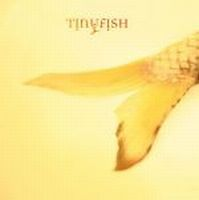

Studio album by Tinyfish
- Released: 19 December 2006
- Genre: Progressive rock
- Length: 47:14
- Label: Lazy Gun Records
- Producer: Tinyfish

Tinyfish chronology
Tinyfish (2006)	Curious Things (2009)

Tinyfish is the debut album by the English progressive rock band Tinyfish.

== Track listing ==
1. "Motorville" – 4:54
2. "Fly Like A Bird" – 4:11
3. "Nine Months on Fire" – 5:46
4. "Too High For Low Company" – 4:15
5. "All of the People, All of the Time" – 1:22
6. "Build Your Own Enemy" – 5:16
7. "God Eat God" – 3:12
8. "Sundried" – 1:56
9. "All Hands Lost" – 12:26
10. "Tinyfish" – 3:56

== Personnel ==
- Simon Godfrey – Lead vocals, guitars, guitar synthesizer, drums
- Jim Sanders – Guitars, guitar synthesizer, backing vocals
- Paul Worwood – Bass guitar, bass pedals
- Robert Ramsay – Spoken word, harmonica
