= Fromuz =

Uzbek progressive rock band

- Origin: Tashkent, Uzbekistan
- Genres: Progressive rock, jazz fusion
- Years active: 2004–present
- Label: 10T Records
- Members: Vitaly Popeloff; Albert Khalmurzaev; Evgeniy Popelov
- Past members: Andrew Mara-Novik; Vladimir Badirov; Surat Kasimov; Ali Izmailov; Igor Elizov
- Website: www.fromuzband.com

Fromuz (also known briefly as ‘’’FROM.UZ’’’) is an Uzbek progressive rock band founded in 2004 in Tashkent by guitarist Vitaly Popeloff, bassist Andrew Mara-Novik, drummer Vladimir Badirov, and keyboard player Albert Khalmurzaev. They wanted to compose music that would bring them the greatest pleasure, as well as help to splash out emotions and express their ideas and feelings. The name Fromuz was borrowed from an early song title and is short for “from Uzbekistan”. Fromuz has become one of the most successful progressive rock/fusion bands in Central Asia. The band's sound is predominantly instrumental.

== History ==
Fromuz's first test of playing together live was at a concert dance "Sodom & Gomorra XXI” composed by Albert Khalmurzaev for the Youth Theater of Uzbekistan. This play, done in a progressive rock style, was performed at the International Theater Festival in St. Petersburg in 2008.

In 2005, the band performed at The International Blues Music Festival, “Astana Blues 2005”, and took part in a series of ethnic music concerts, including “Greeting from Nostradamus”, by drummer V. Badirov. In 2006, Fromuz was awarded one of the Crystal Awards by Snob Collection as the best music project of the year in Uzbekistan.

In 2006, the band attracted the attention of 10T Records. Fromuz signed their first record contract with 10T in August that year and set out to record their debut album. "Audio Diplomacy" was released in February 2007 as a CD/DVD set. It is a live album consisting of 8 instrumental tracks. In 2008, Fromuz released their second album "Overlook" via 10T Records. "Overlook" was recorded at Losis studio in Tashkent and mixed at Charleston Sound. "Overlook" was the last album recorded by the original lineup. ‘’Quartus Artifactus’’, the 4th band album and an acoustic anthology of Fromuz music, was released in May 2011.

In 2008 after Andrew Mara-Novik and Vladimir Badirov left the band to seek employment in another country, Ali Izmailov and Surat Kasimov filled the drummers and assist positions in Fromuz. Also, Igor Elizov was hired as the second keyboard player. In this new membership, Fromuz were signed by Iosis Studio to work on their fresh material, and ‘’Seventh Story’’ album became the result of this collaboration. Besides the changes in the lineup, Fromuz modified the structure of their compositions. The sound became more energetic and vocals appeared in several compositions. It was at this time that the dot/period was added to the name to differentiate from ‘’’the original lineup. To support the ‘’Seventh Story’’ album, Fromuz gave a series of concerts in September 2008 and March 2009 on the stages of Youth theatre of Uzbekistan and Ilkhom Theatre. In September 2010, band released a second live DVD recorded and shot during Fromuz’s live performance at the Youth Theatre of Uzbekistan in September 2008.

== Influences ==
Bands that the members of Fromuz have been inspired by include various musicians such as King Crimson, Pink Floyd, Yes, Jethro Tull, Miles Davis, Led Zeppelin, Jeff Beck and Rush. .

== Live performances ==
Concert activity of Fromuz includes report-concerts. It can be two or three concerts in the year. Each concert takes 2–3 days on the same stage. The first Fromuz concert was playing the Imitation–live at the Youth Theatre of Uzbekistan. The band was chosen to open the ceremony for Uzbekistan’s first rock music awards, the 2009 IOSIS Fest. Also there were 2 big conceptual shows in Fromuz history. They are «Quartus Artifactus» and «Fromuz Anthology». «Quartus Artifactus» gig took place on June 23, 2009, at the Ilkhom Theatre in Tashkent. The conception of this show was to play compositions using just acoustic instruments. At the beginning of 2010, Fromuz performed «Quartus Artifactus» concert, named so because of the planned set list. It comprises best tracks from all albums.

Throughout their career, Fromuz performed at several progressive rock and blues festivals. In 2007 band was invited to The Baja Prog Festival in Mexico where they played on one stage with other famous progressive rock figures such as Jordan Rudess (Dream Theater), Univers Zero, Focus. In August 2007, Fromuz participated in the «Summer Nights» festival in Chimkent (Kazakhstan) where the band performed compositions from their first album ‘’Audio Diplomacy’’.

== Cover songs ==
Fromuz has covered some other artists’ work during their career. In 2009 Fromuz took part in ‘’10T: Undercover’’ album where they performed their cover version of King Crimson’s “Starless and Bible Black”. Also in summer 2010, Fromuz started working on Jeff Beck’s “Brush with the Blues”.

== Band members ==
There have been four different lineups of Fromuz. The original lineup of guitarist Vitaly Popeloff, keyboardist Albert Khalmurzaev, drummer Vladimir Badirov, and bassist Andrew Mara-Novik released two albums. Then in May 2008 Mara-Novik and Badirov were replaced by Surat Kasimov and Ali Izmailov, also Igor Elizov was hired as the second keyboard player. After leaving Surat Kasimov in July 2009, Albert Khalmurzaev started playing bass. And finally, in September 2010, Ali Izmailov left the group. Nowadays there is no constant drummer in Fromuz and every concert the band invites different session drummers.

=== Current members ===
- Vitaly Popeloff–guitars, lead vocals
- Albert Khalmurzaev–bass, backing vocals
- Evgeniy Popelov–keyboards, backing vocals

=== Former members ===
- Andrew Mara-Novik–bass (2004–2008)
- Vladimir Badirov–drums (2004–2008)
- Surat Kasimov–bass (2008–2009)
- Ali Izmailov–drums (2008–2010)
- Igor Elizov - piano keyboards (2008-2011)
- Evegeniy Popelov - keyboards (session in 2007)

== Discography ==
=== Studio albums ===
- Overlook (2008)
- Seventh Story (2010)
- Quartus Artifactus (2011)
- Sodom and Gomorrah (2013)

=== Live albums ===
- Audio Diplomacy (2007)

=== Live DVD releases ===
- Playing the Imitation (2007)
- Inside Seventh Story (2010)
