= The Future Kings of England =

British progressive rock band

- Origin: Ipswich, United Kingdom
- Genres: Progressive rock
- Years active: 2003–present
- Members: Ian Fitch; Karl Mallett; Simon Green; Steven Mann
- Website: www.thefuturekingsofengland.com

The Future Kings of England are a British progressive rock band from Ipswich. Influenced by early Pink Floyd, Hawkwind, and King Crimson their music also contains some elements of post-rock along the lines of Mogwai or Sigur Rós.

== Discography ==
- 2003: 10:66 (EP)
- 2005: The Future Kings of England
- 2007: The fate of old mother Orvis
- 2009: The viewing point
- 2011: Who Is This Who Is Coming

== Personnel ==
- Ian Fitch – Guitars
- Karl Mallett – Bass
- Simon Green – Drums
- Steven Mann – Keyboards

== See also ==
- "'Oh, Whistle, and I'll Come to You, My Lad'", the ghost story that Who Is This Who Is Coming is based on.
