= Lynn Meredith =

American musician

- Born: Yankton, South Dakota, United States
- Genres: Rhythm and blues, progressive rock
- Occupation: Singer

Lynn Meredith is an American musician and abstract artist who was a founding member of the group Kansas.

== Early life and education ==
Born in Yankton, South Dakota, Meredith's roots are in rhythm and blues, later branching out into progressive rock in his late teens. Meredith graduated from Manhattan High School in 1969.

== Career ==
=== Kansas I and II ===
Meredith lived in Manhattan, Kansas and formed Saratoga with Kerry Livgren, Don Montre and Dan Wright after high school in Topeka, Kansas. Saratoga merged with another Topeka group, White Clover, that became the first version of Kansas in 1970. As Kansas began to play original music from member Kerry Livgren, Meredith began using his voice as another instrument, and searched for ways to add to the music using falsetto and various vocalizations.

Kansas I broke up later that year and Kansas II began with some additional new members, but the core of Meredith, Livgren, Montre and Wright remained. Kansas II stayed together until early 1974 when Livgren left the band to join White Clover. That version became the well known version of Kansas.

=== Proto-Kaw ===
After Kansas, Meredith did not sing professionally for many years, but recorded with a band called Plastique in the early 1980s. He has since reunited with his other Kansas II cohorts in Proto-Kaw.

Currently, Meredith records with Proto Kaw, the reformed version of Kansas. Proto Kaw re-grouped after the original Kansas II demo recordings were discovered and released on Cuneiform Records in 2002. This release caused the original members of Kansas to communicate for the first time in 28 years. A reunion party was planned in Kansas City in 2002 and the band enjoyed playing together again. This led to Kerry Livgren writing music for some experimental recordings with the members and an album, Before Became After was released under the Proto Kaw name in April 2004 on the Inside Out Music Label. Since that time, Proto Kaw has begun performing live again and released their third CD The Wait of Glory in January 2006. They toured Europe in 2006 and released their fourth CD in 2011 entitled "Forth". Recently Lynn Meredith took part in "Ancient Rites of the Moon", the first álbum of the international super group Stardust Reverie Project released in 2014 and performed the vocals for "Song for Catina". He was also asked to perform two additional songs on the new Stardust Reverie album "Proclamation of Shadows" entitled "Silver Bullet" and "Wuthering Heights".

=== Football coach ===
While away from professional music, Meredith served as an assistant football coach at Kansas State University, Panhandle State University, and Pittsburg State University.

=== Color analyst ===
Later, he spent over fifteen years as color analyst for Pittsburg State football on KKOW (AM).

=== Music exec and manager ===
Meredith managed singing star Andy Williams Theatre in Branson prior to his death, then became vice-president of Marketing and Communications for the NAIA (National Association of Intercollegiate Athletics) and CDL Electric in Pittsburg, Kansas.

=== Plastique reunion ===
Meredith currently is devoting a majority of his time to painting and preparing for a Fall 2023 recording session with the band Plastique, a band he sang lead vocals with in the 1980s.

== Awards and honours ==
In 2011, Meredith, a 1969 graduate of Manhattan High School, was inducted in their "Wall of Fame" in a ceremony at the school. He was inducted along with guitarist Dwayne Bailey, who played with Bob Seger and Chicago.

In 2015, Meredith was inducted in the Kansas Music Hall of Fame, as a member of the group Proto Kaw. The ceremony was held at the Opera House in Lawrence, Kansas.

== Discography ==
=== Plastique ===
- Plastique (1984)

=== Proto-Kaw ===
- Proto-Kaw:Early Recordings from Kansas 1971-73 (2002)
- Before Became After (2004)
- Compilation CD - CPROGROCK:Leaven (2004)
- Wait of Glory (2006)
- Forth (2011)
- Before Became After:Partially Re-recorded, re-mixed and re-mastered (2014)
- Wait of Glory:Partially Re-recorded, re-mixed and re-mastered (2015)
- Forth:Partially Re-recorded, re-mixed and re-mastered (2016)

=== Stardust Reverie Project ===
- Ancient Rites of the Moon (2014)
- Proclamation of Shadows (2015)

=== Kerry Livgren Q.A.R. Album ===
- The Days We Live (2022)
