= Timeline of progressive rock (1990–1999) =

This is a timeline of artists, albums, and events in progressive rock and its subgenres. This article contains the timeline for the period 1990–1999.

== Contents ==
1990 - 1991 - 1992 - 1993 - 1994 - 1995 - 1996 - 1997 - 1998 - 1999

- See also
- Links and references

== 1990 ==
=== Newly formed bands ===
- Amorphis
- Ark
- Big Big Train
- Opeth
- Tool
- Ulysses

=== Albums ===
Release date	Artist	Album	Country
29 January 1990	Fish	Vigil in a Wilderness of Mirrors	England
1 May 1990	Devil Doll	Eliogabalus	Italy
21 May 1990	Mike Oldfield	Amarok	UK
12 June 1990	Jeff Lynne	Armchair Theatre	England
25 June 1990	Ozric Tentacles	Erpland	England
1990 Jun	Iona	Iona	England
20 August 1990	Queensrÿche	Empire	US
23 October 1990	King's X	Faith Hope Love	US
1990	After Crying	Overground Music	Hungary
1990	Asturias	Brilliant Streams	Japan
1990	Barclay James Harvest	Welcome to the Show	England
1990	Begnagrad	Jodlovska Urška	Yugoslavia
1990	Collage	Basnie	Poland
1990	Doctor Nerve	Did Sprinting Die?	US
1990	Electric Light Orchestra Part Two	Electric Light Orchestra Part Two	England
1990	Ezra Winston	Ancient Afternoons	Italy
1990	Halloween	Laz	France
1990	L'Ensemble Raye	Meme en Hiver, Comme un Pinson dans l'Eau	Switzerland
1990	Mastermind	Volume One	US
1990	MCH Band	Es Reut Mich F	Czechoslovakia
1990	Minimum Vital	Sarabandes	France
1990	Ne Zhdali	Rhinoceros And Other Forms Of Life	Estonia
1990	Nimal	Voix De Surface	Various
1990	Not Drowning, Waving	Tabaran	Australia/Papua New Guinea
1990	Pantokraator	Pantokrator I	Estonia
1990	PFS	279	US
1990	Providence	And I'll Recite an Old Myth	Japan
1990	Quaterna Requiem	Velha Gravura	Brazil
1990	Sieges Even	Steps	US
1990	Solaris	1990	Hungary
1990	Tiemko	Ocean	France
1990	Toy Matinee	Toy Matinee	US
1990	U Totem	U Totem	US

=== Events ===
- Rick Wright is made a full member of Pink Floyd again, after being fired by Roger Waters in 1980 but remaining as a paid session musician until the end of the 1987-1989 world tours in support of A Momentary Lapse of Reason.

== 1991 ==
=== Newly formed bands ===
- Änglagård
- Eleven
- Pain of Salvation
- Eldritch
- Ten Jinn

=== Albums ===
Release date	Artist	Album	Country
4 February 1991	Queen	Innuendo	England
18 February 1991	Mike Oldfield	Heaven's Open	England
10 March 1991	Motoi Sakuraba	Gikyokuonsou	Japan
16 April 1991	Frank Zappa	The Best Band You Never Heard in Your Life	US
30 April 1991	Yes	Union	Various
3 June 1991	Hawkwind	Palace Springs	England
4 June 1991	Frank Zappa	Make a Jazz Noise Here	US
14 June 1991	Frank Zappa	You Can't Do That on Stage Anymore, Vol. 4	US
24 June 1991	Marillion	Holidays in Eden	England
13 August 1991	Mr. Bungle	Mr. Bungle	US
19 August 1991	Ozric Tentacles	Strangeitude	England
29 August 1991	Marc Catley And Geoff Mann	The Off The End Of The Pier Show	England
2 September 1991	Jethro Tull	Catfish Rising	England
3 September 1991	Rush	Roll the Bones	Canada
24 September 1991	Magellan	Hour of Restoration	US
28 October 1991	Fish	Internal Exile	England
1991 Oct	Echolyn	Echolyn	US
11 November 1991	Genesis	We Can't Dance	England
1991	Ain Soph	Marine Menagerie	Japan
1991	Apocalypse	Apocalypse	Brazil
1991	Banco del Mutuo Soccorso	Da qui messere si domina la valle	Italy
1991	Daniel Denis	Sirius and The Ghosts	Belgium
1991	Deus Ex Machina	Gladium Caeli	Italy
1991	Djam Karet	Burning the Hard City	US
1991	Djam Karet	Suspension & Displacement	US
1991	Doctor Nerve	Beta 14 OK	US
1991	Galahad	Nothing is Written	England
1991	Steve Howe	Turbulence	England
1991	IQ	J'ai Pollette D'arnu	England
1991	Kenso	Yume No Oka	Japan
1991	Mastermind	Brainstorm	US
1991	Miriodor	3rd Warning	Canada
1991	Not Drowning, Waving	Proof	Australia
1991	Pendragon	The World	England
1991	Sepsis	Литургия Безумия (Liturgia Bezumia)	Russia
1991	Shub-Niggurath	C'Étaient De Très Grands Vents	France

=== Disbandments ===
- Keep the Dog

=== Events ===
- Yes becomes composed of an eight-man supergroup constituted by members from Yes (Squire, Rabin, White, Kaye & Anderson) and Anderson Bruford Wakeman Howe. The band undertakes a world tour lasting into 1992.
- Freddie Mercury (Queen) dies from complications of AIDS.
- IQ - Peter Nicholls (vocals) formally re-joins. Bass player John Jowitt replaces Les Marshall.
- Kevin "James" Labrie is hired as new vocalist for Dream Theater.

== 1992 ==
=== Newly formed bands ===
- Sirrah
- Spock's Beard

=== Reformed bands ===
- Emerson, Lake & Palmer
- Gong

=== Albums ===
Release date	Artist	Album	Country
1992 Jan	Kingston Wall	I	Finland
10 March 1992	Tool	Opiate	US
21 April 1992	Porcupine Tree	On the Sunday of Life...	England
11 May 1992	Hawkwind	Electric Tepee	England
18 May 1992	Cardiacs	Heaven Born and Ever Bright	England
18 May 1992	Emerson, Lake & Palmer	Black Moon	England
1992 May	Devil Doll	Sacrilegium	Italy
8 June 1992	Asia	Aqua	England
7 July 1992	Dream Theater	Images and Words	US
10 July 1992	Frank Zappa	You Can't Do That on Stage Anymore, Vol. 5	US
10 July 1992	Frank Zappa	You Can't Do That on Stage Anymore, Vol. 6	US
31 August 1992	Mike Oldfield	Tubular Bells II	England
7 September 1992	Roger Waters	Amused to Death	England
27 October 1992	Frank Zappa	Playground Psychotics	US
2 November 1992	Porcupine Tree	Voyage 34	England
2 November 1992	Pink Floyd	Shine On (9-CD box set)	England
16 November 1992	Genesis	The Way We Walk, Volume One: The Shorts	England
16 November 1992	King Crimson	The Great Deceiver	England
1992	After Crying	Megalazottak Es Megszomoritottak	Hungary
1992	Ange	Les Larmes Du Dalaï Lama	France
1992	Änglagård	Hybris	Sweden
1992	Ars Nova	Fear & Anxiety	Japan
1992	Atavism of Twilight	Atavism of Twilight	US
1992	Begnagrad	Tastare (Theoldwones)	Slovenia
1992	Biglietto per l'Inferno	Il tempo della semina	Italy
1992	Calliope	La Terra dei Grandi Occhi	Italy
1992	Camel	Dust and Dreams	England
1992	Casino	Casino	England
1992	Citizen Cain	Serpents in Camouflage	Scotland
1992	Echolyn	Suffocating the Bloom	US
1992	Galadriel	Chasing The Dragonfly	Spain
1992	Il Berlione	Il Berlione	Japan
1992	Il Castello di Atlante	Sono io il signore delle terre a Nord	Italy
1992	Iona	The Book of Kells	England
1992	Isildurs Bane	The Voyage - A Trip to Elsewhere	Sweden
1992	Jadis	More than Meets the Eye	England
1992	Landberk	Riktigt Äkta	Sweden
1992	Nuova Era	Io e Il Tempo	Italy
1992	Pentwater	Out of the Abyss	US
1992	Eris Pluvia	Rings of Earthly Light	Italy
1992	Sithonia	Spettacolo Annullato	Italy
1992	Xaal	On the Way	France

=== Events ===
- The Yes Union tour ends. Yes reverts to the 1980s lineup (Anderson, Squire, Kaye, Rabin & White).

== 1993 ==
=== Newly formed bands ===
- Kasandrin Glas
- Moongarden
- Neverne Bebe
- Paley's Watch (project of Marc Catley, lately of Marc Catley/Geoff Mann collaborations)

=== Albums ===
Release date	Artist	Album	Country
11 January 1993	Genesis	The Way We Walk, Volume Two: The Longs	England
1993 Feb	Kingston Wall	II	Finland
23 March 1993	Frank Zappa	Ahead of Their Time	US
6 April 1993	Tool	Undertow	US
26 April 1993	Jethro Tull	25th Anniversary Box Set	England
17 May 1993	Steve Hackett	Guitar Noir	England
7 June 1993	Porcupine Tree	Up the Downstair	England
30 July 1993	Camel	Never Let Go	England
3 August 1993	Voivod	The Outer Limits	Canada
24 August 1993	Steve Howe	The Grand Scheme of Things	England
31 August 1993	Dream Theater	Live at the Marquee	US
24 September 1993	Anekdoten	Vemod	Sweden
19 October 1993	Rush	Counterparts	Canada
1993	Barclay James Harvest	Caught in the Light	England
1993	Ain Soph	Five Evolved From Nine	Japan
1993	Daniel Denis	Les Eaux Troubles	Belgium
1993	Deus Ex Machina	Deus Ex Machina	Italy
1993	Devil Doll	The Sacrilege of Fatal Arms	Italy
1993	Discipline	Push and Profit	US
1993	Echolyn	...and every blossom (EP)	US
1993	Everon	Paradoxes	Germany
1993	Iona	Beyond These Shores	England
1993	Glass Hammer	Journey of the Dunadan	US
1993	Lars Hollmer & The Looping Home Orchestra	Door Floor Something Window	Sweden
1993	Iluvatar	Iluvatar	US
1993	I Mother Earth	Dig	Canada
1993	IQ	Ever	England
1993	Kenso	Live 92	Japan
1993	L'Ensemble Raye	Quelques Pièces Détachées	Switzerland
1993	LiR	Magico Magico!	Ireland
1993	Magellan	Impending Ascension	US
1993	Montefeltro	Il Tempo di Far la Fantasia	Italy
1993	Nimal	Dis Tanz	Various
1993	Not Drowning, Waving	Circus	Australia
1993	Ozric Tentacles	Jurassic Shift	England
1993	Pendragon	The Window of Life	England
1993	Philharmonie	Les Elephants Carrillonneurs	France
1993	Saga	The Security of Illusion	Canada
1993	Spacious Mind	Cosmic Minds at Play	Sweden
1993	Ulysses	Neronia	Germany

=== Events ===
- Frank Zappa dies of prostate cancer.

== 1994 ==
=== Newly formed bands ===
- Eyefear
- Little Tragedies
- Portal
- Symphony X
- Ved Buens Ende

=== Albums ===
Release date	Artist	Album	Country
7 February 1994	Marillion	Brave	England
21 March 1994	Yes	Talk	England
28 March 1994	Pink Floyd	The Division Bell	England
13 June 1994	Asia	Aria	England
15 June 1994	Kingston Wall	III – Tri-Logy	Finland
27 June 1994	No-Man	Flowermouth	England
27 June 1994	Ozric Tentacles	Arborescence	England
26 July 1994	Fates Warning	Inside Out	US
25 August 1994	Paley's Watch	November	England
26 September 1994	Emerson, Lake & Palmer	In the Hot Seat	England
3 October 1994	Electric Light Orchestra Part II	Moment Of Truth	England
4 October 1994	Dream Theater	Awake	US
10 October 1994	Porcupine Tree	Staircase Infinities	England
18 October 1994	Queensrÿche	Promised Land	US
21 November 1994	Mike Oldfield	The Songs of Distant Earth	England
1994 Nov	Mastermind	Mastermind III: Tragic Symphony	US
1994	5uu's	Hunger's Teeth	US
1994	After Crying	Föld és ég	Hungary
1994	Änglagård	Epilog	Sweden
1994	A Piedi Nudi	A Piedi Nudi	Italy
1994	Ars Nova	Transi	Japan
1994	Big Big Train	Goodbye to the Age of Steam	England
1994	Citizen Cain	Somewhere But Yesterday	Scotland
1994	Collage	Moonshine	Poland
1994	Deus Ex Machina	De Republica	Italy
1994	Djam Karet	Collaborator	US
1994	Earthstone	Seed	England
1994	Enchant	A Blueprint of the World	US
1994	Finisterre	Finisterre	Italy
1994	Halloween	Merlin	France
1994	Il Trono dei Ricordi	Il Trono dei Ricordi	Italy
1994	Jadis	Across the Water	England
1994	Mike Keneally	Boil That Dust Speck	US
1994	Koenji Hyakkei	Hundred Sights of Koenji	Japan
1994	Landberk	One Man Tell's Another	Sweden
1994	Neverne Bebe	Neverne Bebe I	Serbia
1994	Not Drowning, Waving	Hammers	Australia
1994	Pär Lindh Project	Gothic Impressions	Sweden
1994	Philharmonie	Nord	France
1994	Roine Stolt	The Flower King	Sweden
1994	Strangelove	Time For The Rest of Your Life	England
1994	The EC Nudes	Vanishing Point	Various
1994	Tipographica	Tipographica	Japan
1994	U Totem	Strange Attractors	US
1994	Versailles	Le Tresor de Valliesres	France

=== Disbandments ===
- Änglagård
- Pink Floyd

=== Events ===
- King Crimson reforms as a sextet.
- Pink Floyd goes on single largest tour the band has ever done. The tour is a hit, grossing a record US$300 million. It also marks the first time since 1975 the band plays The Dark Side of the Moon live in its entirety.
- The "90125" era Yes releases Talk on Victory Records. Though plans had been worked on to include possibly Steve Howe and Rick Wakeman, Victory president Phil Carson insists on signing only Anderson, Squire, Rabin, White, and Kaye. Talk marks the last album of this version of Yes.
- Dream Theater keyboardist Kevin Moore leaves the band to pursue a solo career. His replacement is former Alice Cooper and Kiss keyboardist Derek Sherinian.

== 1995 ==
=== Newly formed bands ===
- The Flower Kings

=== Albums ===
Release date	Artist	Album	Country
1995 Jan	Spock's Beard	The Light	US
30 January 1995	Porcupine Tree	The Sky Moves Sideways	England
6 February 1995	Arena	Songs from the Lion's Cage	England
7 March 1995	Echolyn	As The World	US
1 April 1995	Höyry-Kone	Hyönteisiä voi rakastaa	Finland
3 April 1995	King Crimson	Thrak	England
2 May 1995	Ian Anderson	Divinities: Twelve Dances with God	England
15 May 1995	Opeth	Orchid	Sweden
29 May 1995	Pink Floyd	Pulse	England
26 June 1995	Marillion	Afraid of Sunlight	England
26 June 1995	Saga	Generation 13	Canada
11 July 1995	Shadow Gallery	Carved In Stone	US
4 September 1995	Jethro Tull	Roots to Branches	England
19 September 1995	Dream Theater	A Change of Seasons	US
10 October 1995	Mr. Bungle	Disco Volante	US
25 October 1995	The Flower Kings	Back in the World of Adventures	Sweden
27 October 1995	Ayreon	The Final Experiment	Netherlands
30 October 1995	Hawkwind	Alien 4	England
1995 Nov	Ozric Tentacles	Become the Other	England
11 December 1995	Anekdoten	Nucleus	Sweden
1995	Apocalypse	Perto do Amanhecer	Brazil
1995	Aufklarung	De La Tempesta.. l'Oscuro Piacere	Italy
1995	Biota	Object Holder	US
1995	Birdsongs of the Mesozoic	Dancing On A'A	US
1995	Buldožer	Noć	Slovenia
1995	Collage	Changes	Poland
1995	Deus Ex Machina	Non Est Ars Quae Ad Effectum Casus Venit	Italy
1995	Doctor Nerve	Skin	US
1995	Everon	Flood	Germany
1995	Glass Hammer	Perelandra	US
1995	Happy Family	Happy Family	Japan
1995	Steve Howe	Seraphim	England
1995	Steve Howe	Voyagers	England
1995	Iluvatar	Children	US
1995	Iona	Journey Into the Morn	England
1995	Kasandrin Glas	Kasandrin Glas	Serbia
1995	Landberk	Unaffected	Sweden
1995	LiR	Nest	Ireland
1995	Pangée	Hymnemonde	Canada
1995	The Ancient Veil	The Ancient Veil	Italy
1995	Tipographica	The Man Who Does Not Nod	Japan
1995	White Willow	Ignis Fatuus	Norway
1995	Los Jaivas	Hijos de la Tierra	Chile

=== Events ===
- Tony Kaye retires from Yes while Trevor Rabin leaves the band to concentrate on soundtrack production. Steve Howe and Rick Wakeman rejoin Yes in what fans and critics alike call the reformation of "Classic Yes."
- Paul D'Amour leaves Tool. Justin Chancellor, of the band Peach, comes on board during the recording of their next album as their new bassist.
- Russell Allen joins Symphony X replacing Rod Tyler on vocals.

== 1996 ==
=== Newly formed bands ===
- Mostly Autumn (England)
- Mudvayne (US)
- Traindodge (US)
- Gojira (France)

=== Albums ===
Release date	Artist	Album	Country
9 January 1996	Alex Lifeson	Victor	Canada
15 January 1996	Camel	Harbour of Tears	England
1996 Jan	Spock's Beard	Beware of Darkness	US
27 February 1996	Frank Zappa	The Lost Episodes	US
1996 Feb	Devil Doll	Dies Irae	Italy
11 March 1996	Asia	Arena	England
14 May 1996	Amorphis	Elegy	Finland
20 May 1996	Enchant	Wounded	US
21 May 1996	King Crimson	Thrakattak	England
25 May 1996	The Flower Kings	Retropolis	Sweden
1996 May	Quidam	Quidam	Poland
10 June 1996	Cardiacs	Sing to God	England
24 June 1996	Opeth	Morningrise	Sweden
10 September 1996	Rush	Test For Echo	Canada
17 September 1996	Tool	Ænima	US
24 September 1996	Frank Zappa	Läther	US
30 September 1996	Porcupine Tree	Signify	England
7 October 1996	Rick Wright	Broken China	England
23 October 1996	Ayreon	Actual Fantasy	Netherlands
28 October 1996	Yes	Keys to Ascension	England
1996 Oct	Frank Zappa	Frank Zappa Plays the Music of Frank Zappa: A Memorial Tribute	US
18 November 1996	Änglagård	Buried Alive	Sweden
20 December 1996	Motoi Sakuraba	Shining the Holy Ark	Japan
1996	After Crying	De Profundis	Hungary
1996	Ageness	Imageness	Finland
1996	Apocalypse	Aurora dos Sonhos	Brazil
1996	Arena	Pride	England
1996	Cast	Beyond Reality	Mexico
1996	D.F.A.	Lavori In Corso	Italy
1996	Deus Ex Machina	Diacronie Metronomiche	Italy
1996	Different Light	All About Yourself	Czech Republic
1996	Discipline	Unfolded Like Staircase	US
1996	Divae	Determinazione	Italy
1996	Echolyn	When the Sweet Turns Sour	US
1996	Eyefear	Edge of Existence	Australia
1996	Finisterre	In Limine	Italy
1996	* Finisterre Project	Höstsonaten	Italy
1996	Steve Hackett	Genesis Revisited	England
1996	Steve Howe	Homebrew	England
1996	IQ	Forever Live	England
1996	Koenji Hyakkei	II	Japan
1996	Landberk	Indian Summer	Sweden
1996	Mastermind	Until Eternity	US
1996	Miriodor	Elastic Juggling	Canada
1996	Le Orme	Il fiume	Italy
1996	Pendragon	Masquerade Overture	England
1996	Philharmonie	Rage	France
1996	Sinkadus	Aurum Nostrum	Sweden
1996	Somnambulist	Somnambulist	US
1996	Spirosfera	Umanamnesi	Italy
1996	Symphony X	Divine Wings of Tragedy	US
1996	Tipographica	God Says I Can't Dance	Japan

=== Disbandments ===
- Paley's Watch

=== Events ===
- Rick Davies reforms Supertramp.
- Phil Collins leaves Genesis.
- Pink Floyd get inducted into the Rock and Roll Hall of Fame.

== 1997 ==
=== Newly formed bands ===
- Aenima
- Dir En Grey
- Farpoint
- Karnataka
- Karnivool
- Liquid Tension Experiment

=== Albums ===
Release date	Artist	Album	Country
January 1997	Iona	Heaven's Bright Sun	England
24 March 1997	Supertramp	Some Things Never Change	England
25 March 1997	Queensrÿche	Hear in the Now Frontier	US
1 April 1997	Höyry-Kone	Huono parturi	Finland
8 April 1997	Frank Zappa	Have I Offended Someone?	US
11 April 1997	The Flower Kings	Stardust We Are	Sweden
21 April 1997	Marillion	This Strange Engine	England
22 April 1997	Fates Warning	A Pleasant Shade of Gray	US
6 May 1997	Magellan	Test of Wills	US
19 May 1997	Fish	Sunsets on Empire	England
21 May 1997	Radiohead	OK Computer	England
25 July 1997	Dir En Grey	Missa	Japan
14 August 1997	Godspeed You! Black Emperor	F♯A♯∞	Canada
21 August 1997	Pain of Salvation	Entropia	Sweden
1 September 1997	Genesis	Calling All Stations	England
7 September 1997	Enchant	Time Lost	US
14 September 1997	Frank Zappa	Mystery Disc	US
23 September 1997	Dream Theater	Falling into Infinity	US
20 October 1997	Porcupine Tree	Coma Divine – Recorded Live in Rome	England
3 November 1997	Yes	Keys to Ascension 2	England
24 November 1997	Yes	Open Your Eyes	England
1997	5uu's	Crisis In Clay	US
1997	After Crying	6	Hungary
1997	A Piedi Nudi	Eclissi	Italy
1997	Apocalypse	Lendas Encantadas	Brazil
1997	Aviolinee Utopia	Aviolinee Utopia	Italy
1997	Banco del Mutuo Soccorso	Nudo	Italy
1997	Barclay James Harvest	River of Dreams	(England-but released in Germany & Switzerland only) (Imported into UK)
1997	Big Big Train	English Boy Wonders	England
1997	Boud Deun	Astronomy Made Easy	US
1997	Cast	Angels and Demons	Mexico
1997	Citizen Cain	Raising the Stones	UK
1997	Crucible	Tall Tales	US
1997	Djam Karet	The Devouring	US
1997	Everon	Venus	Germany
1997	Kasandrin Glas	Neko kao ja	Serbia
1997	Mastermind	Live in Tokyo	US
1997	Flash	Psychosync	England
1997	Gatto Marte	Danae	Italy
1997	Roger Hodgson	Rites of Passage	US
1997	IQ	Subterranea	England
1997	Isildurs Bane	MIND Volume 1	Sweden
1997	Lizard	W Galerii Czasu	Poland
1997	Le Orme	Elementi	Italy
1997	Los Jaivas	Trilogia: El Reencuentro	Chile
1997	Neverne Bebe	Neverne Bebe II	Serbia
1997	Premiata Forneria Marconi	Ulisse	Italy
1997	Pär Lindh Project	Mundus Incompertus	Sweden
1997	Radio Massacre International	Organ Harvest	England
1997	Sigur Rós	Von	Iceland
1997	Ten Jinn	Wildman	US
1997	Townscream	Nagyvarosi Ikonok	Hungary
1997	Volare	The Uncertainty Principle	US

=== Disbandments ===
- Kasandrin Glas

=== Events ===
- Citing difficulties in agreements over management, Rick Wakeman again departs Yes. Longtime band affiliate Billy Sherwood joins as a full member. Keyboardist Igor Khoroshev also joins.
- X Japan - They officially disbanded on December 31 after their live performance held on the same day.
- Chris DeGarmo leaves Queensrÿche.
- Mario Mutis Rejoined Los Jaivas.

== 1998 ==
=== Newly formed bands ===
- Cog
- Fair To Midland
- Muse
- Nurkostam
- Oceansize
- Olive Mess
- Sylvan
- Thy Catafalque

=== Albums ===
Release date	Artist	Album	Country
10 March 1998	Liquid Tension Experiment	Liquid Tension Experiment	US
10 March 1998	Tortoise	TNT	US
1998 Mar	Symphony X	Twilight in Olympus	US
20 April 1998	Arena	The Visitor	England
27 April 1998	Steve Hackett	The Tokyo Tapes	England
19 May 1998	Spock's Beard	Kindness of Strangers	US
14 July 1998	Explorers Club	Age of Impact	US
21 July 1998	Pain of Salvation	One Hour by the Concrete Lake	Sweden
18 August 1998	Opeth	My Arms, Your Hearse	Sweden
30 August 1998	Ayreon	Into the Electric Castle	Netherlands
21 September 1998	Marillion	Radiation	England
22 September 1998	Shadow Gallery	Tyranny	US
1998 Oct	Morte Macabre	Symphonic Holocaust	Sweden
1998	Ad Infinitum	Ad Infinitum	US
1998	Apocalypse	The Best of Apocalypse	Brazil
1998	Ars Nova	The Book of the Dead	Japan
1998	A Triggering Myth	The Sins of Our Saviours	US
1998	Consorzio Acqua Potabile	Robin Delle Stelle	Italy
1998	Deus Ex Machina	Equilibrismo da Insofferenza	Italy
1998	Eldritch	El Niño	Italy
1998	Enchant	Break	US
14 July 1998	Eniac Requiem	Space Eternal Void	US
1998	Forgas Band Phenomena	Roue Libre	France
1998	Glass Hammer	On To Evermore	US
1998	Grovjobb	Landet Leverpastej	Sweden
1998	Steve Howe	Quantum Guitar	England
1998	Steve Howe	Mothballs	England
1998	Höstsonaten	Mirrorgames	Italy
1998	Interférence Sardines	Mare Crisium	Canada
1998	IQ	Seven Stories into Ninety-Eight	England
1998	IZZ	Sliver of a Sun	US
1998	Karnataka	Karnataka	UK
1998	Mastermind	Excelsior!	US
1998	Mostly Autumn	For All We Shared...	England
1998	Nathan Mahl	The Clever Use of Shadows	Canada
1998	Pallas	Beat The Drum	Scotland
1998	Present	Certitudes	Belgium
1998	Priam	3 Distances / Irregular Signs	France
1998	Quidam	Sny aniołów (Angels' Dreams)	Poland
1998	Salem Hill	The Robbery of Murder	US
1998	Roine Stolt	Hydrophonia	Sweden
1998	Témpano	Atabal Yemal	Venezuela
1998	Thinking Plague	In Extremis	US
1998	White Willow	Ex Tenebris	Norway

=== Disbandments ===
- Boud Deun
- Emerson, Lake & Palmer
- Genesis
- Conception
- Rush (temporarily) - After the death of his daughter and wife within a year of each other, drummer Neil Peart was quoted in an interview as being "certain that I would never play drums or write lyrics or a book again." He would eventually rediscover his love for drums and reform Rush in 2001.

=== Events ===
- Barclay James Harvest announces an extended sabbatical in which the band members would pursue separate projects, which marked the end of the original group.
- Thomas Miller leaves Symphony X.

== 1999 ==
=== Newly formed bands ===
- Disen Gage
- Divinity Destroyed
- Mastodon
- Protest The Hero
- Project W.I.L.L.
- Sleepytime Gorilla Museum
- Transatlantic

=== Albums ===
Release date	Artist	Album	Country
5 March 1999	Gordian Knot	Gordian Knot	US
22 March 1999	Porcupine Tree	Stupid Dream	England
23 March 1999	Spock's Beard	Day for Night	US
29 March 1999	Amorphis	Tuonela	Finland
12 June 1999	Sigur Rós	Ágætis byrjun	Iceland
15 June 1999	Liquid Tension Experiment	Liquid Tension Experiment 2	US
21 June 1999	Cardiacs	Guns	England
13 July 1999	Mr. Bungle	California	US
28 July 1999	Dir En Grey	Gauze	Japan
23 August 1999	Jethro Tull	J-Tull Dot Com	England
20 September 1999	Yes	The Ladder	England
5 October 1999	Neal Morse	Neal Morse	US
18 October 1999	Opeth	Still Life	Sweden
18 October 1999	Marillion	Marillion.com	England
18 October 1999	Camel	Rajaz	England
26 October 1999	Dream Theater	Metropolis Pt. 2: Scenes from a Memory	US
1999 Oct	Anekdoten	From Within	Sweden
1999 Oct	Iona	Woven Cord	England
16 November 1999	The Flower Kings	Flower Power	Sweden
1999	Ange	La Voiture À Eau	France
1999	Ark	Ark	Norway
1999	Charming Hostess	Eat	US
1999	Deadwood Forest	Mellodramatic	US
1999	D.F.A.	Duty Free Area	Italy
1999	Finisterre	In Ogni Luogo	Italy
1999	Steve Howe	Pulling Strings	England
1999	Steve Howe	Portraits of Bob Dylan	England
1999	Iluvatar	A Story Two Days Wide	US
1999	IQ	The Lost Attic	England
1999	Little Tragedies	Passions on Titanic	Russia
1999	Mizraab	Panchi	Pakistan
1999	Mostly Autumn	The Spirit of Autumn Past	England
1999	Mushroom	Analog Hi-Fi Surprise	US
1999	NeBeLNeST	NeBeLNeST	France
1999	Ozric Tentacles	Waterfall Cities	England
1999	Present	No 6	Belgium
1999	Quidam	Baja Prog - Live in Mexico '99	Poland
1999	Saga	Full Circle	Canada
1999	Samla Mammas Manna	Kaka	Sweden
1999	Sinkadus	Cirkus	Sweden
1999	Sotos	Sotos	France
1999	Solaris	Nostradamus: Book of Prophecies	Hungary
1999	Sylvan	Deliverance	Germany
1999	Ten Jinn	As On A Darkling Plain	US
1999	The Science Group	A Mere Coincidence	Various
1999	Universal Totem Orchestra	Rituale Alieno	Italy
1999	Los Jaivas	Mamalluca	Chile

=== Events ===
- First annual North East Art Rock Festival (NEARfest), Bethlehem, PA (US)
- Dream Theater replaces keyboardist Derek Sherinian with Jordan Rudess (ex-Dixie Dregs) after the success of the side-project Liquid Tension Experiment. Admitting that Dream Theater's decision was ultimately a favor, Sherinian goes on to establish a solo career and the band Planet X with drummer Virgil Donati.

== See also ==
- Timeline of progressive rock: other decades: 1960s - 1970s - 1980s - 2000s - 2010s – 2020s
- Timeline of progressive rock (Parent article)
- Progressive rock
- Canterbury Scene
- Symphonic rock
- Avant-rock
- Rock in Opposition
- Neo-prog
- Progressive metal
- Jazz fusion
