= List of progressive rock artists =

The following artists have released at least one album in the progressive rock genre. Individuals are included only if they recorded or performed progressive rock as a solo artist, regardless of whether they were a member of a progressive rock band at any point.

== 0–9 ==
- 21st Century Schizoid Band: Band of former King Crimson members that performs a mixture of original songs, King Crimson classics, and material from the various members' solo efforts
- 5uu's: Mid-1980s RIO band from Los Angeles
- 801: Supergroup that included former Roxy Music members Phil Manzanera and Brian Eno
- 10cc: British band active in the 1970s with their art pop music

== A ==
- Acqua Fragile
- ACT
- Aeon Zen
- Agitation Free: German band from the 1970s similar to early Pink Floyd
- Air: French duo whose retro synth-based electronica and space pop music features progressive rock leanings
- Alamaailman Vasarat
- The Alan Parsons Project
- Alux Nahual: Politically oriented band that formed in Guatemala in the 1980s
- Ambrosia: Early 1970s California band that later played soft rock
- Amon Düül II: Band that formed out of the German late 1960s political art commune Amon Düül
- Analogy
- Anathema
- And So I Watch You from Afar
- ...And You Will Know Us by the Trail of Dead
- Jon Anderson: Lead singer of Yes
- Anderson Bruford Wakeman Howe: Late-1980s attempt by singer Jon Anderson to restore Yes to its progressive rock direction and lineup
- Anekdoten
- Ange: French symphonic prog band active mainly from the early 1970s through the mid-1980s. Their later work displays a simpler, pop orientation
- Änglagård: Swedish band of the early 1990s that played 1970s-style symphonic prog
- Aphrodite's Child: Greek trio
- Aquarium: Band formed in the Soviet Union in the 1970s
- Arcadea: American prog synth band with Brann Dailor on drums and vocals
- Area: Politically oriented 1970s multinational band from Italy
- Arena
- Ark
- Armonite
- Ars Nova
- Art Bears: Henry Cow offshoot featuring Fred Frith
- Art in America
- Art Zoyd: French Zeuhl band
- Asia: Prog/pop supergroup featuring members from Yes
- Ash Ra Tempel
- Atheist
- Atoll
- Atomic Rooster: British heavy prog band originally featuring Carl Palmer before his departure to Emerson Lake & Palmer
- Kevin Ayers: Founding member of Soft Machine
- Ayreon: Dutch progressive metal project from the mid-1990s onward

== B ==
- Babylon
- Back Door: Once produced by Carl Palmer
- Bad Religion: though a hardcore punk band, they released a prog album Into the Unknown to reflect members early influences.
- Banco del Mutuo Soccorso: Italian band, formed in the 1970s
- Barclay James Harvest
- Be-Bop Deluxe: British band who combined art rock and glam rock, influencing new wave
- Jeff Beck
- David Bedford
- Beggars Opera: Scottish band of the early 1970s
- Bi Kyo Ran
- Biffy Clyro: Scottish rock band with progressive leanings
- Big Big Train: English progressive rock band formed in Bournemouth in 1990
- Big Wreck
- Bigelf
- The Birds of Satan: American progressive hard rock supergroup led by the Foo Fighters' drummer Taylor Hawkins
- Birth Control: German band from the early 1970s
- David Bowie
- Bozzio Levin Stevens: A late 1990s supergroup
- Braen's Machine: early 1970s studio project with Piero Umiliani and Alessandro Alessandroni
- Brainticket
- Brand X: Late 1970s band influenced by jazz and funk, frequently associated with Phil Collins
- Arthur Brown
- Jack Bruce
- Bruford: Jazz and Canterbury-style supergroup with Bill Bruford, Allan Holdsworth, Dave Stewart and Jeff Berlin
- Buckethead: Highly virtuosic and experimental guitarist
- Declan Burke
- Kate Bush: British singer-songwriter with progressive rock leanings, discovered by David Gilmour

== C ==
- Camel: Band from the mid-1970s classic era of prog
- Can: German band heavily influenced by 20th century composition
- The Cancer Conspiracy
- Captain Beefheart
- Caravan: Canterbury band, active primarily during the 1970s
- Caravan of Dreams: Solo project of Caravan bassist Richard Sinclair
- Cardiacs: English band
- Cast: Mexican band that formed in the late 1970s, who frequently appeared at or organized prog festivals during the 1990s
- Cathedral
- Cherry Five: Italian band who finally released a second album in 2015
- Chicago
- Chiodos
- Clearlight: French band from the 1970s similar to early Gong but closer to symphonic prog
- Cluster
- Coheed and Cambria
- Cold Fairyland: Band from Shanghai rooted in traditional Chinese music
- Colosseum
- Crack the Sky
- Curved Air
- Cynic
- Holger Czukay

== D ==
- Darryl Way's Wolf
- Dead Can Dance
- Death Organ
- The Decemberists: Indie rock band with strong Jethro Tull and Genesis influences.
- Deep Purple: British hard rock band with strong progressive influences. Often considered one of the first three heavy metal bands along with Black Sabbath and Led Zeppelin.
- Demon Fuzz: English band that played progressive rock, soul and funk, with influences from psychedelic soul, jazz, acid rock and world music
- Deus Ex Machina: 1990s Italian rock band that updates the 1970s Italian progressive rock style
- DFA
- The Dillinger Escape Plan
- Discipline: Led by the Matthew Parmenter, combined the stylings of Genesis and Van der Graaff Generator
- Dixie Dregs
- Djam Karet: 1980s US band that was a precursor to math rock
- The Doors: American band considered part of the proto-prog subgenre
- Dream Theater: American/Canadian band of ex-Berklee students that helped to raise the profile of progressive metal during the 1990s and 2000s
- Dungen
- Francis Dunnery and the New Progressives

== E ==
- East of Eden
- Echolyn: Prog band of the 1990s, with metaphysical, literary-inspired lyrics
- Edison's Children: Pete Trewavas of Marillion and Transatlantic's band with Eric Blackwood featuring Rick Armstrong (son of astronaut Neil Armstrong)
- Egg: Dave Stewart on keys
- Elbow: English rock band with progressive leanings
- Elder
- Electric Light Orchestra (ELO): English band who played string and synth-based "Beatlesque" prog rock, as well as pop and disco-influenced music
- Eloy: A German band most prominent during the 1970s but who have continued to perform through lineup changes
- Emerson, Lake & Palmer (ELP): "Classic era" prog band
- Emerson, Lake & Powell: A brief, mid-1980s incarnation of ELP in which Cozy Powell was the drummer
- England: A late 1970s British band that was a forerunner to neo-prog
- The Enid: A British band formed in the 1970s by Barclay James Harvest arranger Robert John Godfrey, who have remained intermittently active from the 1980s onward.
- Epitaph
- Brian Eno

== F ==
- Faith No More
- Family: 1960s–1970s British band that contributed members to Blind Faith and King Crimson
- Faust
- The Fierce and the Dead
- Finch (Dutch band) Instrumental Dutch symphonic prog band from the 1970s
- Fish: Former Marillion lead singer
- Flash: Band formed by Peter Banks after his departure from Yes
- The Flower Kings: Symphonic prog band, from Sweden, active from the 1990s onward
- Focus: Mainly instrumental Dutch group who recorded the 1971 song "Hocus Pocus"
- Pope Francis: former pope of the Roman Catholic Church, released the progressive rock album Wake Up! in 2015
- Robert Fripp: Founding member and lead guitarist of King Crimson
- Fripp & Eno
- Fred Frith
- Hasse Fröberg and the Musical Companion
- FromUz
- Frost*: Neo-prog band from the 2000s
- Frumpy: German prog band from the early 1970s with female vocals
- FSB
- Fusion Orchestra
- The Future Kings of England

== G ==
- Peter Gabriel: Former lead singer of Genesis, who used many world music influences in his solo material
- The Gathering: Dutch alternative rock band who started out as a doom metal band before shifting to a more prog style with the addition of vocalist Anneke van Giersbergen.
- Genesis: One of the major classic era bands and a definitive example of the symphonic prog style. They transitioned to more accessible music starting in 1978, though they still included progressive rock songs on later albums.
- Gentle Giant: Band with a medieval-sounding style who are considered to be among the most important of the 1970s progressive rock bands.
- Ghost
- Gilgamesh
- Glass Hammer
- Goblin: Funk-influenced Italian band known for film soundtrack work
- Gong: French space rock and psych rock band associated with the Canterbury scene.
- Go: Supergroup formed in 1976 by Stomu Yamashta which included Steve Winwood, Al Di Meola, Klaus Schulze and Michael Shrieve
- Golden Earring
- Gov't Mule: Combines elements of blues, hard rock, and jazz fusion
- Grails: Eclectic, textural band from the 2000s
- Marek Grechuta
- Greenslade
- Grobschnitt: 1970s symphonic prog band from Germany who pursued a more commercial direction during the 1980s
- Gryphon: 1970s British band who used a medieval folk style and played period instruments such as krumhorns.
- Guru Guru

== H ==
- Hail the Sun
- Peter Hammill: Lead singer of Van Der Graaf Generator
- Bo Hansson
- Happy the Man: Highly virtuosic 1970s symphonic prog band who performed mainly in the Washington, D.C. area
- Harmonium (band)
- Hatfield and the North
- Hawkwind: Long-running space rock band with science fiction lyrics and some crossover with heavy metal
- Haze
- Henry Cow: Highly experimental and political 1970s British band who founded the Rock in Opposition movement
- Here & Now: Late-1970s British band that combined elements of punk rock and progressive rock
- Hidria Spacefolk: Space rock band
- Steve Hillage: Guitarist from Gong
- Hoelderlin: German prog band from the 1970s who started out in folk prog before moving into symphonic prog
- Steve Howe: English musician and lead guitarist of Yes

== I ==
- The Incredible String Band: Early British folk/prog hybrid
- Indian Summer
- Iona: British band active since the late 1980s whose lyrics contain a Christian element
- IQ: Neo-prog band of the 1980s
- Iron Butterfly
- It Bites: 1980s pop/prog band
- IZZ

== J ==
- Jade Warrior
- Jadis: Neo-prog band
- Jane: Early 1970s krautrock band
- Jeavestone
- Jethro Tull: Started in the late 1960s as a British blues band, heavily influenced by jazz and British folk rock, who later moved into progressive rock

== K ==
- Kaipa: 1970s Swedish band whose Roine Stolt went on to form The Flower Kings
- Kansas: United States symphonic prog band of the 1970s, who underwent numerous personnel changes and moved to a more commercial style in the 1980s
- Karmamoi
- Karnataka
- Karnivool: Early work was in alternative metal style, more recent albums have been in progressive rock style.
- Katatonia
- Mike Keneally
- Khan
- King Crimson: One of the genre's best-known and most influential bands, who have frequently disbanded and regrouped with radically different lineups and musical styles
- King Gizzard & the Lizard Wizard: Multi-genre Australian 6-piece that has many progressive rock albums including Polygondwanaland.
- King's X
- Kingdom Come: Early 1970s British band fronted by Arthur Brown
- Kingston Wall
- Klaatu: Canadian trio
- Kraan
- Kraftwerk
- Krokus: Debuted as a progressive rock band, then became a metal band in the style of AC/DC
- Kyros

== L ==
- Landberk
- Lana Lane
- Bill Laswell
- Lightning Bolt
- Liquid Tension Experiment: A band that formed as a Dream Theater side project and includes John Petrucci and Tony Levin
- Lucifer's Friend: early heavy metal and progressive rock band
- Marco Lo Muscio
- Arjen Anthony Lucassen: Leader of the Ayreon project

== M ==
- Magellan
- Magenta
- Magma: A French band who launched the Zeuhl subgenre in the 1970s
- Magna Carta: An English progressive folk group
- Magnum (early)
- Mahavishnu Orchestra: An early fusion band that was a major influence on King Crimson and others
- Manfred Mann's Earth Band: A mixture of hard rock, fusion, and progressive rock
- Albert Marcoeur
- Marillion: British neo-prog band
- The Mars Volta
- Mastermind
- Mastodon
- Matching Mole: A 1970s Canterbury band
- McDonald & Giles: An early King Crimson offshoot
- Mercury Rev
- Metamorfosi: Italian prog band from the early 1970s who reformed in the 2000s
- Mew
- Midlake
- Miriodor: A Canadian RIO band
- miRthkon
- Mogul Thrash: Early 1970s British band that included John Wetton
- Mona Lisa
- The Moody Blues: Classical rock pioneers who are credited as having created the first progressive rock album, Days of Future Passed
- Moon Safari: A Swedish band that makes extensive use of complex vocal harmonies
- Mt. Helium
- Patrick Moraz
- Mostly Autumn
- Mr. Bungle: American experimental rock/metal band that has included progressive rock elements
- Mudvayne
- Muse
- Museo Rosenbach
- My Brightest Diamond

== N ==
- National Health
- The Neal Morse Band (NMB) - Formed in 2014 by Neal Morse who also releases prog as a solo artist
- Nektar
- Neu!
- Nexus: Progressive symphonic rock from Argentina
- The New York Rock & Roll Ensemble: A 1960s–1970s classical rock group
- Niacin
- The Nice: Highly influential early classical rock band fronted by Keith Emerson
- Czeslaw Niemen
- Erik Norlander: Keyboardist who has performed solo and with Ayreon

== O ==
- Oceansize
- Mike Oldfield: Studio performer who often played every instrument in his large-scale compositions
- Omega: Hungarian band formed in the 1960s
- Opeth: Swedish progressive rock band with death metal roots
- Le Orme: One of the most important Italian progressive rock bands
- Osibisa: Ghanaian Afro-pop and Afrobeat band who incorporate funk, jazz, and progressive rock. Their album covers were illustrated by Roger Dean
- O Terco
- Ozric Tentacles

== P ==
- Pain of Salvation
- Pallas: A neo-prog band
- Carl Palmer
- Panna Fredda
- Panzerballett
- Passport
- Pavlov's Dog: US art rock band from the 1970s featuring much mellotron. Bill Bruford from Yes guested on drums on their second album.
- Pendragon: A neo-prog band
- Anthony Phillips: Original guitarist for Genesis
- The Physics House Band: Brighton-based experimental rockers
- Picchio dal Pozzo
- The Pineapple Thief
- Pink Floyd: Pioneering space rock band who went on to become one of the major progressive rock bands
- Planet X: A band fronted by former Dream Theater keyboardist Derek Sherinian
- The Plastic People of the Universe
- Platypus
- Polyphia
- Popol Vuh
- Porcupine Tree
- Premiata Forneria Marconi (PFM): A major Italian band of the early 1970s, once produced by Peter Sinfield, who also wrote English lyrics for the band.
- Present: 1990s Belgian group led by Univers Zero guitarist Roger Trigaux and his son Reginald
- The Pretty Things
- Primus: American trio who channel funk metal, alternative metal, and progressive rock
- Procol Harum: Early progressive rock band which recorded with orchestras
- Proto-Kaw: A progressive jam band formed by Kerry Livgren of Kansas
- The Protomen
- Pulsar
- Puppet Show
- Pure Reason Revolution

== Q ==
- Quasar
- Quatermass
- Michael Quatro: Classically-based, keyboard-driven progressive rock from the 1970s
- Queen
- Quiet Sun

== R ==
- Rare Bird
- Rare Earth
- Refugee
- Remedy
- Renaissance: Early 1970s symphonic prog band known for a strong classical influence and Annie Haslam's operatic vocals
- Ritual
- Riverside
- Roxy Music
- Todd Rundgren
- Jordan Rudess: Outside of his work in Dream Theater he has released a number of albums as a solo artist
- Rudess/Morgenstein Project: A collaboration between Dream Theater keyboardist Jordan Rudess and Dixie Dregs drummer Rod Morgenstein
- Rush

== S ==
=== Sa–Sm ===
- Saga: Canadian neo-prog band
- Samla Mammas Manna: A RIO band with folk influences
- SBB
- Klaus Schulze: electronic music pioneer, composer, and musician. Was a member of the Krautrock bands Tangerine Dream, Ash Ra Tempel, and The Cosmic Jokers before launching a solo career consisting of more than 60 albums.
- Paul Schutze
- Secret Machines
- Semiramis
- Seventh Wave
- Shub-Niggurath: A French Zeuhl band
- Sigur Ros: Icelandic post-rock band
- Sikth: British progressive metal and djent band
- Peter Sinfield
- Skin Alley: Progressive band from the late 1960s–early 1970s whose work has influences from blues rock, jazz fusion, and art rock
- Slapp Happy: A late-1970s offshoot of Henry Cow
- Sleepytime Gorilla Museum: A Californian RIO band
- Smak: Serbian and Yugoslav band

=== Sn–Sz ===
- Soft Heap
- Soft Machine: Canterbury scene band initially playing psychedelic rock, later moving into experimental jazz rock and free jazz
- Solaris
- Solstice
- Sparks: American art rock duo who played glam rock, synth-pop and disco
- Spirit: A psychedelic band that was a major influence on early progressive rock
- Split Enz: Started out as a prog band, but moved to new wave starting in 1979
- Spock's Beard: 1990s United States symphonic prog band
- Chris Squire: English musician and bassist of Yes
- Starcastle: A progressive band from the US similar to Yes
- Stackridge: English progressive rock, pop, and folk band who have been described as precursors of Britpop
- Al Stewart
- Stormy Six: A politically active 1970s Italian band who later aligned with RIO
- Strawbs: British 1970s symphonic prog band with strong folk roots
- Stick Men
- Still: A late-1990s version of Echolyn
- Stolen Babies
- Stranglers: Formed in 1974 and heavily influenced by prog rock though generally regarded as a punk rock act
- Styx: A US band who played extended compositions and classical adaptations with a hard rock edge, then played arena rock
- Supertramp
- Survival: Dutch progressive/symphonic rock band
- Syd Arthur: A modern band in the Canterbury style
- Sylvan
- Symphony X
- System of a Down: American-Armenian nu metal band that has also played progressive metal

== T ==
- Taï Phong
- Tangerine Dream: A highly influential German band of electronic innovators
- Serj Tankian
- Tasavallan Presidentti
- TEA
- Tempest: A 1970s band featuring Allan Holdsworth and Jon Hiseman
- Ten Jinn: A band featuring former Happy the Man guitarist Stan Whitaker
- The Tangent: An eclectic progressive band
- Thinking Plague: A 1990s RIO band
- Third Ear Band
- Thirty Seconds to Mars: Alternative rock band whose early work contained progressive rock influences
- This Heat: A late 1970s British band with prog, punk, and avant-garde elements
- Three
- Tomahawk
- Ton Steine Scherben: A politically vocal Krautrock band
- The Tony Williams Lifetime: A rock-oriented fusion band with psychedelic elements
- Tool: A Los Angeles alternative band who helped define the progressive metal genre during the 1990s and 2000s
- Touchstone
- Trans-Siberian Orchestra
- TriPod
- Triana: A flamenco-influenced 1970s Spanish band
- Triumvirat: German power trio fronted by virtuoso keyboardist Jürgen Fritz
- Twelfth Night

== U ==
- U.K.: Late 1970s supergroup that recorded just two studio albums With King Crimson's John Wetton and Bill Bruford on their first album
- Umphrey's McGee: 6-piece progressive jam band from South Bend, Indiana
- Univers Zero: A 1970s Belgian Zeuhl band
- Unquiet Nights: Northern Irish/Italian band with Progressive influences. Third album "Seasons In Exile" is a continuous linear story.
- Uriah Heep: British progressive rock band who draw on metal, acid rock, and folk
- Utopia

== V ==
- Van der Graaf Generator: 1970s British band
- Christian Vander
- Vangelis
- Voivod: Canadian progressive metal band with thrash metal roots
- Von Hertzen Brothers

== W ==
- Rick Wakeman: Keyboard player who recorded a string of concept albums as a solo artist as well as being a member of Yes and recording with David Bowie
- Jeff Wayne
- John Wetton
- White Willow
- Wigwam
- Steven Wilson: Outside of his work in Porcupine Tree, he has had a long career as a solo artist
- Winger
- Wishbone Ash
- Robert Wyatt

== Y ==
- Stomu Yamash'ta
- Yes: A British symphonic prog band from the 1970s onward

== Z ==
- Frank Zappa: The experimentalism, eclecticism and virtuosity in Zappa's music are of a progressive rock nature.

== See also ==
- Ambient music
- Art rock
- Berlin School of electronic music
- British folk rock
- Italian progressive rock
- Minimalism
- Musique concrete
- No wave
- Post-rock
- Progressive metal
- Serialism
- Steely Dan
- Third stream
