= The Fifth Season =

The Fifth Season may refer to:

== Music ==
- The Fifth Season (Oh My Girl album) or the title song, 2019
- The Fifth Season (Quidam album), 2009
  - "The Fifth Season", the title song, originally from SuREvival, 2005
- The Fifth Season, a 2020 album by Lafawndah

== Other uses ==
- The Fifth Season (film), a 2012 Belgian film
- The Fifth Season (novel), a 2015 novel by N. K. Jemisin
- Fifth Season (company), a film and television production company
- The period of spring floods in the Soomaa National Park in Estonia
