= Paul Ramsey (musician) =

American rock drummer (born 1966)

- Born: Paul Gibson Ramsey; Cheltenham, Pennsylvania, U.S.
- Genres: Rock, jazz, progressive rock
- Occupation: Drummer
- Years active: 1978–current
- Formerly of: Echolyn

Paul Ramsey (born January 24, 1966) is an American drummer. He is a founding member of the progressive rock quintet Echolyn.

== Biography ==
Ramsey was born in Cheltenham, Pennsylvania. He has over 25 years experience performing and collaborating with various artists throughout the U.S., Europe, and Canada. He is an experienced studio musician appearing on a variety of artists' works. Artists and engineers that have collaborated with Ramsey include T-Bone Wolk, Pete Moshay, Kevin Killen, Paul Bryan, Robert Hazard, Mike Mills, Jerry Marotta, Glenn Rosenstein, and Francis Dunnery.

Ramsey is a founding member of the progressive rock band Echolyn. He was a member of New Jersey based folk rock band Grey Eye Glances. Grey Eye Glances was signed to Mercury Records and was cited in 1997's Billboard Magazine's "Weekly Coverage for Hot Prospects for Prospects for Heatseekers Chart" for its innovative approach to touring utilizing Borders Books to reach new potential audiences. He is also a former member of the North Wales, PA alternative grunge rock band Winston’s Dog.

== Artistry ==
=== Technique ===
Ramsey plays traditional grip as well as American match grip.

=== Influences ===
Ramsey has a variety of drumming and musical artist influences. He is drawn to innovative, tasteful, song-centric players who provide appropriate parts for the music. Phil Collins, John Bonham, Gary Husband, Mitch Mitchell, and Vinnie Colaiuta are among his top influences in this vein.

== Equipment ==
Ramsey primarily plays a Pearl Masters Series kit (1994), Zildjian cymbals and Remo drumheads. For variety, he often adds unique "trash" elements to the kit such as 16” unmatched high hats or china cymbals. In the studio, Ramsey also plays on a Ludwig maple John Bonham-style kit featuring 26x14 bass drum.

== Discography ==
=== As Member ===
==== With Echolyn ====
- Echolyn (1991)
- Suffocating the Bloom (1992)
- ...and every blossom (1993)
- As the World (1995)
- When the Sweet Turns Sour (1996)
- To Cry You a Song: A Collection of Tull Tales (contribution) (1996)
- Cowboy Poems Free (2000)
- A Little Nonsense (Now and Then) (2002) (box set)
- Mei (2002)
- Progfest '94 (the Official Bootleg) (2002) (released for trading among fans)
- Jersey Tomato, Volume 2 (Live at the Metlar-Bodine Museum) (2004)
- Stars and Gardens, Volume 4 DVD (2004)
- The End Is Beautiful (2005)
- After the Storm: A Benefit Album for the Survivors of Hurricane Katrina (contribution) (2006)
- echolyn (2012)
- I Heard You Listening (2014)

==== With Grey Eye Glances ====
- Eventide, 1997
- One Day Soon, 1998
- Painted Pictures, 1998
- Grey Eye Glances 1992-98, 1999
- Grey Eye Glances 1998-99, 1999
- Grey Eye Glances Live Double CD, 1999
- If I Was, 2000 - 6 song EP
- A Little Voodoo, 2002
- Grey Eye Glances Live, 2003

==== With Francis Dunnery ====
- There's a Whole New World Out There (Aquarian Nation, 2009)
- Louder than Usual- DVD (Aquarian Nation/Flying Spot Entertainment, 2010)

==== With The Syn ====
- Big Sky (Alliance Records, 2009)

==== With Mike Mills ====
- Jesus Christ by Big Star for the Red Apple Foundation (2005)

==== With Brett Kull ====
- Orangish, Blue (2002)
- Last of the Curlews (2008)

==== With Still/Always Almost ====
- God Pounds His Nails (1997)
- Always Almost (1997)

==== With Ray Weston ====
- This is My Halo (2003)

==== With Bob Dreher ====
- A Once Upon a Time (2010)
- Ch. 2, Finger Talk (2011)
- Frohe, Weihnachten!, Schittervul! (2012)
- Inside Out (2013)

==== With Lindsay McKay ====
- Timeless (2012)

==== With Tiras Buck ====
- The Guided Half Life (2014)

=== As touring drummer ===
==== With Echolyn ====
- 1991–2016

==== With Grey Eye Glances ====
- 1997–2011

==== With Francis Dunnery ====
- Tall Blond Helicopter Tour (2009)
- There's a Whole New World Out There Tour (2010)
- CKDCF Fundraising Event (2009, 2010, 2012)

==== With Scott Radway ====
- Former Ghost Tour (2013)
