= Trono =

Trono ("throne" in Filipino, Italian, Spanish and Portuguese) may refer to:

- Diante do Trono, Brazilian gospel band
- El Trono de Mexico, Duranguense band formed in Mexico in 2004
- Giuseppe Trono (1739–1810), Italian painter
- Il Trono dei Ricordi, Italian Progressive rock band of the 1990s
- Il trono e la seggiola, 1918 Italian film directed by Augusto Genina
- Julian Marcus Trono (born 1997), Filipino child actor and television personality
- Robert E. Trono, the Deputy Director of the United States Marshals Service
- Trono de Gracia con Don Moen, album of Christian worship music recorded by Don Moen
- "Trono", a 2026 song by the Filipino boy band BGYO, from the EP On Demand
