= Salem Hill =

Salem Hill may refer to:

- Salem Hill (band)
- Salem Hill, New Jersey
