= Uno (Panna Fredda album) =

1971 album by Panna Fredda

Studio album by Panna Fredda
- Released: 1971
- Recorded: 1970
- Genre: Progressive rock
- Length: 34:05
- Language: Italian
- Label: Vedette (record label)
- Producer: Francesco Anselmo

Uno is the sole album by the Italian progressive rock band Panna Fredda. The album was recorded in 1970 but their record company delayed the release until 1971 and provided very little marketing support. As a consequence the album was not successful and the group disbanded. Uno was recorded in 1970 making it "one of the first classics of Italian progressive rock."

== Reception ==
The album did not have a significant impact on release; however, it has been positively reviewed in later years. Dag Erik Asbjørnsen reviewing Uno in Scented gardens of the mind said: "The secrets behind the great success of this album are magnificent songwriting and musicianship, inventive instrumental ideas (often with references to classical music) and the consistent atmosphere throughout the album."

Jerry Lucky in The progressive rock files said: "A sound that is reminiscent of their contemporaries Banco and Semiramis only a little spicier sounding." Augusto Croce in Italian prog said: "With a great album, highly representative of the Italian prog sound, Panna Fredda should have deserved more success" and "The voice is good, the lyrics original and the album has no weak spots."

== Personnel ==
- Angelo Giardinelli – guitar, lead vocals
- Lino Stopponi – keyboards
- Pasquale "Windy" Cavallo – bass
- Roberto Balocco – drums

== Track listing ==
All tracks are written by Angelo Giardinelli.

Side one
No.	Title	Length
1.	"La Paura (Fear)"	6:00
2.	"Un Re Senza Reame (A king without a throne)"	5:05
3.	"Un Uomo (A man)"	4:55

Side two
No.	Title	Length
4.	"Scacco Al Re Lot (Checkmate for King Lot)"	4:30
5.	"Il Vento La Luna E Pulcini Blu (Sole Rosso) (With the wind and the moon and little blue chicks)"	10:25
6.	"Waiting"	3:10

Later reissues added bonus tracks from Panna Fredda's two singles and some unreleased tracks.

== Release history ==
Year	Region	Label	Format	Catalog	Bonus tracks
1971	Italy	Vedette	LP	VPA 8134	
1989	Italy	Vinyl Magic	CD	VM 001	
2005	Europe	Mayfair Music, Vedette	LP	VM 001 LP	2: Delirio (Frenzy) 3:04, Strisce Rosse (Red Stripes) 2:50
2007	Italy	btf.it	CD	VMCD118	6: Strisce Rosse 2:50, Delirio 3:04, Risveglio 3:04, Un Attimo Fa 3:15, Chiama Una Rondine 2:21, Estate 70 3:17
2011	Italy	Vinyl Magic	LP	VM 118 LP	2: Delirio (Frenzy) 3:04, Strisce Rosse (Red Stripes) 2:50
2012	Italy	Vedette	LP	VM LP 118	2: Delirio (Frenzy) 3:04, Strisce Rosse (Red Stripes) 2:50
2013	Japan	Belle Antique	CD	BELLE 132189	8: Strisce Rosse 2:50, Delirio 3:04, Risveglio 3:04, Un Attimo Fa 3:15, Chiama Una Rondine 2:21, Estate 70 3:17, Una Luce Accesa Troverai 2:40, Vedo Lei 2:42
