= Live (After Crying video) =

Video by After Crying
- Released: 2007
- Recorded: December 23, 2004
- Venue: Petőfi Csarnok, Budapest, Hungary
- Genre: Rock
- Length: 114 mins
- Label: Periferic Records
- Director: Gyorgy Sebok

Live is a 2007 DVD-Video by the Hungarian progressive rock band After Crying. It includes a live performance of After Crying's symphonic rock concert that was recorded at Petőfi Csarnok in Budapest, Hungary on December 23, 2004. It was directed by Gyorgy Sebok with production by Gergely Böszörményi. Most of the narration segments were narrated by Tamas Gorgenyi & Gabor Egervari, supervised by Laszlo Flanek.

== Track listing ==
1. Intro
2. Viaduct
3. -a Invision
4. -b News
5. -c Media Overdose
6. Globevillage At Night
7. NWC - New World Coming
8. Paradise Lost
9. Secret Service
10. Jonah's Prayer
11. -a Good Night I
12. -b Good Night II
13. -c Good Night III
14. Don't Betray Me
15. -a Setup
16. -b Technopolis
17. Burlesque
18. Stonehenge
19. Conclusion
20. Band Introduction - Setup Reprise
21. Farewell I
22. Life Must Go On
23. Arrival Of Manticore II
24. Confess Your Beauty (Excerpt)
25. Cello-Guitar Duet
26. Piano Solo
27. Drum Solo
28. Viaduct - Reprise
29. Farewell II

== Personnel ==
- Cello, bass – Péter Pejtsik
- Drums – Zsolt Madai
- Guitar, synthesizer – Ferenc Torma
- Narrator, concept By – Tamás Görgényi
- Narrator, flute – Gábor Egervári
- Piano, synthesizer – Zoltán Lengyel
- Trumpet, Cornet, synthesizer – Balász Winkler
- Vocals – Zoltán Batky-Valentin
