= Panna Fredda =

Italian progressive rock group

- Origin: Rome, Italy
- Genres: Progressive rock
- Years active: 1969–1971
- Labels: Vedette (record label)
- Past members: Angelo Giardinelli; Giorgio Brandi; Lino Stopponi; Carlo Bruno; Pasquale Cavallo; Filippo Carnevale; Roberto Balocco

Panna Fredda was an Italian progressive rock group originating in Rome in 1969. They recorded one album entitled Uno which was released in 1971.

== Origin ==
The band formed in 1967 as a six-piece playing in Roman nightclubs, initially under the name 'I Figli del Sole', but later changed to 'I Vun Vun' after the club where they performed most often. After talks with Vedette (record label), they let their sax and horn players go and changed their name to Panna Fredda. In 1970 they released their first single Strisce rosse/Delerio for Vedette, and in the same year a second single Una luce accesa troverai/Vedo lei followed.

The first line-up of the band was Angelo Giardinelli, Giorgio Brandi, Carlo Bruno and Filippo Carnevale. However this version soon dissolved, with three of the four band members leaving for various reasons. The second line-up retained Angelo Giardinelli, and added Lino Stopponi, Pasquale "Windy" Cavallo and Roberto Balocco. This line-up recorded their sole album Uno but their record company delayed the release until 1971 and provided very little marketing support. As a consequence the album was not successful and the group disbanded. Uno was recorded in 1970 making it "one of the first classics of Italian progressive rock."

== Reception ==
The album did not have a significant impact on release, however it has been positively reviewed in later years. Dag Erik Asbjørnsen reviewing Uno in Scented gardens of the mind said: "The secrets behind the great success of this album are magnificent songwriting and musicianship, inventive instrumental ideas (often with references to classical music) and the consistent atmosphere throughout the album." Jerry Lucky in The progressive rock files said: "A sound that is reminiscent of their contemporaries Banco and Semiramis only a little spicier sounding." Augusto Croce in Italian prog said: "With a great album, highly representative of the Italian prog sound, Panna Fredda should have deserved more success" and "The voice is good, the lyrics original and the album has no weak spots."

== Membership ==
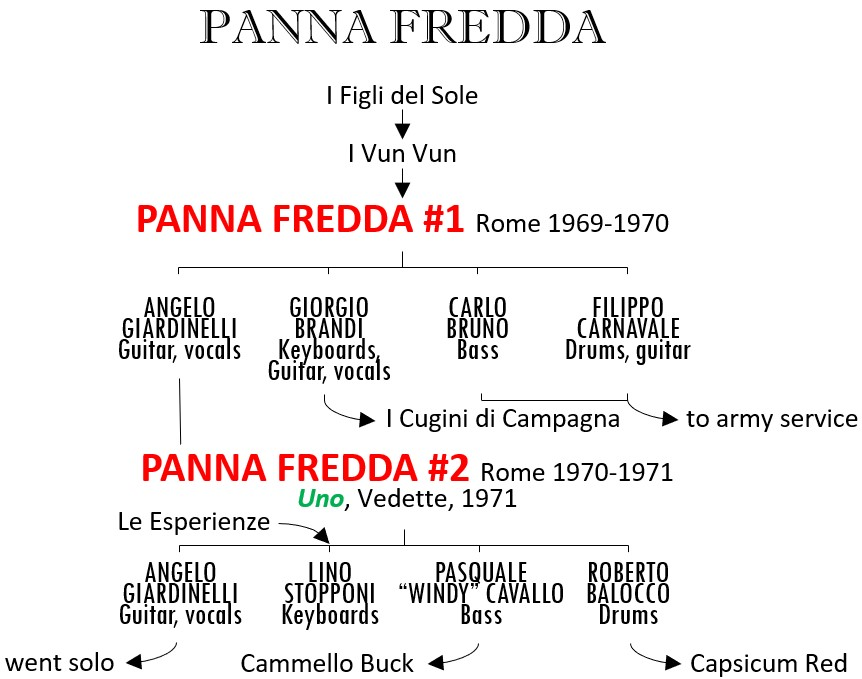
Membership tree of Panna Fredda

=== 1969-1970 ===
- Angelo Giardinelli: guitar, lead vocals
- Giorgio Brandi: keyboards, guitar, vocals
- Carlo Bruno: bass
- Filippo Carnevale: drums, guitar

=== 1970-1971 ===
- Angelo Giardinelli: guitar, lead vocals
- Lino Stopponi: keyboards
- Pasquale "Windy" Cavallo: bass
- Roberto Balocco: drums

== Discography ==
=== Album ===
- 1971 : Uno (Vedette). The album has been reissued many times; Discogs lists 15 different versions.

=== Singles ===
- 1969 : Strisce rosse/Delerio (Vedette)
- 1970 : Una luce accesa troverai/Vedo lei (Vedette)

== Bibliography ==
- Encyclopedia of Italian rock, edited by Cesare Rizzi, Milano, Arcana, 1993, ISBN 978-8-87966-022-8. pp. 329–330 (in Italian).
- Il libro del prog Italiano, by John N. Martin, Michelle Neri and Sandro Neri, Firenze, Giunti, 2013, ISBN 978-88-09-78439-0. pp. 201–202 (in Italian).

== See also ==
- Progressive rock
