= Első évtized =

Első Évtized

Studio album by After Crying
- Released: 1996
- Genre: Rock
- Length: 139:09
- Language: Hungarian
- Label: Periferic Records

After Crying chronology
De Profundis (1996)	Első Évtized (1996)	6 (1997)

Professional ratings
Review scores
Source	Rating
AllMusic	3/5 stars

Első évtized is the fifth album from the Hungarian music group After Crying, released in 1996.

== Track listing ==
=== CD 1 ===
1. Modern idök (7:36)
2. Noktürn (1:52)
3. Kétség és remény közt (4:00)
4. Tépd el a képeket! (6:00)
5. Fly! (2:00)
6. Közjáték II (2:00)
7. A Novelty (2:00)
8. Sötétben (5:05)
9. Árnyékos dal (4:00)
10. Madrigál II (3:00)
11. Vándor (9:20)
12. Manók tánca (5:00)
13. Ébredés (3:00)
14. Elveszett város (2:00)
15. Júdás (10:00)
16. A világ végén (3:41)

=== CD 2 ===
1. Nyitány (2:20)
2. Shining (10:15)
3. Így hallgattam el (6:30)
4. Immár a nap leáldozott (9:40)
5. Hommage à Frank Zappa (8:20)
6. Impromptu no. 7 (6:00)
7. Jó éjt! (11:00)
8. Zsoltár (3:10)
9. Herkules dala (4:20)
10. 21st Century Schizoid Man (7:00)

== Personnel ==
- Csaba Vedres – keyboards
- Péter Pejtsik – cello, vocals
- Kristóf Fogolyán – flute
- Zsolt Maroevich – viola
- Judit Andrejszki – vocals
- Pál Makovecz – trombone
- Otto Racz – oboe
- Aladár Tüske – bassoon
- Balázs Winkler – trumpet
- László Gacs – percussion, drums
- Gábor Egervári – flute, vocals
- Ferenc Torma – guitar, vocals
