= Alone Together (Quidam album) =

Alone Together (album)

Studio album by Quidam
- Released: 2007
- Recorded: at Islands Studio and Teatr Miejski, Inowrocław, June–August 2007
- Genre: Progressive rock
- Length: 63:24
- Label: Rock Serwis
- Producers: Piotr "DJ Kosiak" Kosiński; Zbyszek Florek and Maciek Meller

Quidam chronology
| ...bez półPRĄDU...halfPLUGGED... (2006) | Alone Together (album) (2007) |

Professional ratings
Review scores
| Source | Rating |
|---|---|
| DPRP | (9/10) |

Alone Together is the fifth studio album of Polish progressive rock group Quidam, released 2007. The album consists of nine songs of melodic symphonic rock. Compared to the previous album, SuREvival, there are no personnel changes at all.

== Track listing ==
All songs are composed by Zbysek Florek, Bartek Kossowicz, Maciek Meller, Marta Nowosielska, Maciek Wróblewski and Mariusz Ziólkowski.

1. "Different" – 3:16
2. "Kinds Of Solitude At Night" – 6:00
3. "Depicting Colours Of Emotions" – 10:18
4. "They Are There To Remind Us" – 7:49
5. "Of Illusions" – 8:04
6. "We Lost" – 8:26
7. "One Day We Find" – 6:46
8. "We Are Alone Together" – 8:20
9. "P.S. But Strong Together" – 4:25

== Personnel ==
- Zbyszek Florek – keyboards, backing vocals, mixing
- Maciek Meller – guitars, backing vocals
- Bartek Kossowicz – vocals, backing vocals
- Mariusz Ziółkowski – bass guitar, backing vocals
- Maciek Wróblewski – drums, percussion
- Jacek Zasada – flutes

and:

- Emila Nazaruk – backing vocals on "Kinds of Solitude at Night"
- Piotr Nazaruk – xaphoon on "Different" and zither on "Kinds of Solitude at Night"
- Piotr Rogóż – alto sax on "We Lost"
- Michał Florczak – cover art and booklet design
- Joachim Krukowski – mixing

== Charts ==
| Chart (2010) | Peak position |
|---|---|
| Polish Albums Chart | 14 |
