= XXV Anniversary Concert =

AC XXV (Jubileumi Koncert = Anniversary Concert)

Live album by After Crying
- Released: 2013
- Recorded: November 9, 2011
- Venue: the Palace of Arts, Budapest, (Hungary)
- Genre: Rock, Classical
- Length: CD 1 - 43 minutes CD 2 - 39 minutes
- Language: Hungarian
- Label: Periferic Records – BGDV 221
- Director: Sebok Gyorgy
- Producer: Madai Zsolt, Böszörményi Gergely

XXV Anniversary Concert is a 2013 Hungarian live album and DVD-Video by the progressive rock band After Crying. It contains a performance of their 25th anniversary concert that was recorded live at the Palace of Arts in Budapest, Hungary, on November 9, 2011, and features the band members Pejtsik Peter, Madai Zsolt, Torma Ferenc, Eros Csaba, and Winkler Balazs. A scene from After Crying's 25th Anniversary Concert of "Fanfare for the Common Man" was posted on YouTube by Zsolt Mada.

== Track listing ==
=== CD1 ===
1. Preludio Furioso
2. Creatura
3. Gambler
4. Air
5. Klasszikus Miniatűr = Less Important Things - Classic Miniature
6. Rude
7. Illusionist
8. Shaped
9. Then The Stones Will Sing
10. Torn Apart
11. Percussivo
12. Do Not Cry
13. Rain God
14. I Love Story
15. Tarogato
16. Free Fall
17. Three Desires
18. No Worries No Cry

=== CD2 ===
1. Shining
2. Farwell
3. Concerto For Electric Guitar
4. Sonata
5. Judas
6. Nocturn
7. Goblin Dance
8. Secret Service
9. Madrigal II.
10. Life Must Go On - Symphonic Version
11. Tear The Pictures
12. Fanfare For The Common Man
13. Farewell - Reprise
14. New World Coming

== Personnel ==
- Pejtsik Péter – cello, bass guitar
- Madai Zsolt – drums
- Torma Ference – guitar
- Erős Csaba – piano, keyboards
- Winkler Balazs – trumpet, keyboards
- Andrejszki Judit – vocals
- Batky Zoltan – vocals, guitar
- Korodi Julia – vocals, violin
