= The Time Beneath the Sky =

The Time Beneath The Sky

Studio album by Quidam
- Released: 2002
- Recorded: Recorded at Teatr Miejski Inowrocław
- Genre: Progressive rock
- Length: 64:45
- Label: Rock Serwis
- Producer: Piotr "DJ Kosiak" Kosiński; Zbyszek Florek and Maciek Meller

Quidam chronology
Sny aniołów (Angels' Dreams) (1998)	The Time Beneath The Sky (2002)	SuREvival (2005)

Professional ratings
Review scores
Source	Rating
Allmusic	4/5 stars
DPRP	8.5/10 stars

The Time Beneath The Sky is the third studio album of Polish progressive rock group Quidam, released 2002.

== Track listing ==
1. "Letter from the Desert I" (Florek, Meller) – 6:12
2. "Still Waiting (Letter from the Desert II)" (Derkowska, Florek, Meller) – 4:48
3. "No Quarter" (Jones, Page, Plant) – 11:44
4. "New Name" (Derkowska, Florek, Meller) – 4:45
5. "Kozolec (For Agape)" (Derkowska, Florek, Meller) – 5:00
6. "The Time Beneath the Sky: Credo I" (Derkowska, Florek, Meller) – 8:04
7. "The Time Beneath the Sky: Credo II" (Florek, Meller) – 5:13
8. "The Time Beneath the Sky: You Are (In the Labyrinth of Thoughts)" (Derkowska, Florek, Meller) – 4:31
9. "The Time Beneath the Sky: Quimpromptu" (Florek, Jermakow, Meller, Scholl, Zasada) – 9:35
10. "The Time Beneath the Sky: (Everything Has Its Own) Time Beneath the Sky" (Derkowska, Florek, Meller) – 3:59

== Personnel ==
- Emilia Derkowska – vocal, backing vocals
- Zbyszek Florek – keyboards
- Maciej Meller – guitars
- Jacek Zasada – flutes
- Radek Scholl – bass guitar
- Rafał Jermakow – drums

=== Guest musician ===
- Monika Margielewska – oboe "Letter From The Desert I"
- Miłosz Gawryłkiewicz – flugelhorn "Still Waiting (Letter From The Desert II)"
- Grzegorz Nadolny – contrabass "You Are (In The Labyrinth Of Thoughts)"
