= Grey Eye Glances =

American band from the Philadelphia area

Grey Eye Glances was an American band from the Philadelphia area.

Their name was taken from a quote from Edgar Allan Poe's poem "To One in Paradise".

== Members ==
- Jennifer Nobel – vocals, guitar (through 2010)
- Lindsey McKay – vocals (2011)
- Dwayne Keith Klessel – piano, organ, melodica, vocals
- Eric O'Dell – bass, trumpet, vocals
- Brett Kull (Echolyn guitarist) – guitars, mandolin, banjo, vocals
- Paul Ramsey (Echolyn drummer) – drums, percussion

== History ==
Keith, Nobel & O'Dell began playing together in the early 1990s, and quickly amassed a dedicated following by performing their original material at Borders bookstores up and down the East Coast.

They were originally named Sojourn and released two albums (Songs of Leaving and Further On) but had to surrender the name to another group with an earlier claim.

Their following helped foster sales of two independently released albums, "Songs of Leaving" and "Further On" for their self-owned label, Sojourn Hills Records. In 1996, they signed with Mercury Records and released "Eventide" (1997) and "Painted Pictures" (1998). An additional EP sold exclusively on the internet, entitled "One Day Soon," was the band's last release on Mercury Records before it was merged into a larger label.

To ensure their continued growth, the band funded their purchase of back rights to material produced while they were with Mercury by releasing a four-CD special compilation of rare (the "Red" and "Green" albums) and live material (the 2-disc "Grey Album") that was sold via the internet to their most dedicated fans in 2000.

The band created a company and sold shares in it in order to fund the production of their album A Little Voodoo. It was released in 2002.

In April 2010 the band began recording their follow-up album to A Little Voodoo, but the record was not completed. Brett Kull and Paul Ramsey are also in the progressive rock band Echolyn, having first met Grey Eye Glances in Nashville while recording their As the World album.

In February 2011, Jennifer Nobel decided to retire from Grey Eye Glances, and was replaced by Lindsey McKay, from Lansdale, Pa., and a former American Idol contestant.

== Discography ==
- Songs of Leaving, 1993
- Further On, 1994
- Eventide, 1997
- One Day Soon, 1998
- Painted Pictures, 1998
- Grey Eye Glances 1992-98, 1999
- Grey Eye Glances 1998-99, 1999
- Grey Eye Glances Live Double CD, 1999
- If I Was, 2000 - 6 song EP
- A Little Voodoo, 2002
- Grey Eye Glances Live, 2003
