= Bootleg Symphony =

Bootleg Symphony - Koncertszimfónia
- A CD Release of their bootleg recording "Bootleg Symphony"

Live album by After Crying
- Released: 2001
- Recorded: October 2, 2000
- Venues: Liszt Ferenc Academy of Music, Budapest, (Hungary)
- Genre: Rock
- Length: 54:56
- Label: Periferic

Bootleg Symphony is a 2001 live album by Hungarian progressive rock band After Crying.

== Overview ==
Bootleg Symphony is a bootleg recording of After Crying's symphonic concert that was recorded on October 2, 2000, at The Great Hall inside the Liszt Ferenc Academy of Music in Budapest, Hungary with a 40-piece symphony orchestra. The pieces performed were re-arranged for symphonic and chamber orchestra.

== Track listing ==
All lyrics are written by Görgényi Tamás, Egervári Gábor; all music is composed by Pejtsik Péter, Torma Ferenc, and Winkler Balázs.

No.	Title	Writer(s)	Length
1.	"Viaduct"	Winkler	6:00
2.	"Struggle for Life I"	Görgényi, József Attila, Pejtsik	5:23
3.	"Enigma"	Egervári, Winkler	1:15
4.	"Struggle for Life II"	Wetton, Pejtsik, Palmer-James, Fripp	3:15
5.	"Suburban Night"	Torma	3:19
6.	"Cool Night"	Görgényi, Vedres Csaba	3:48
7.	"Night-Red"	Pejtsik, Vedres Csaba	3:24
8.	"Cool Night" (Reprise)	Görgényi, Vedres	2:17
9.	"Arrival Of Manticore I."	Winkler	2:28
10.	"Aqua"	Winkler	2:01
11.	"Intermezzo"	Winkler	2:39
12.	"Burlesque"	Winkler	3:04
13.	"Finale"	Pejtsik	4:26
14.	"Shinin'"	Görgényi, Pejtsik, Vedres	11:37
Total length:			54:56

== Personnel ==
- Pejtsik Péter – cello, bass
- Pejtsik Péter, Winkler Balázs – conductor
- Madai Zsolt - drums, vibraphone, timpani, cymbal
- Lengyel Zoltán (2) – Grand piano, synthesizer [Korg Trinity ProX], backing vocals
- Torma Ferenc – guitar, synthesizer
- Légrádi Gábor – lead vocals
- Winkler Balázs – trumpet, synthesizer
