= Ten Jinn =

- Origin: California, US
- Genres: Progressive rock
- Years active: 1991—present
- Label: Melodic Revolution Records
- Website: Ten Jinn official site

Ten Jinn is an American, California-based progressive rock band. The band was formed in 1991 by John Paul Strauss and drummer Jimmy Borel (who is no longer with the band). Happy the Man guitarist Stan Whitaker joined the band on the As On A Darkling Plain album.

Their sound has been compared to Echolyn, Salem Hill, Jethro Tull, Saga, and Spock's Beard, and includes the styles of rock music, progressive rock, and Canterbury.

Albums include:

- Wildman
- As On A Darkling Plain (based on the vampire novels of Anne Rice) (1999)
- Alone (2004)
- Sisyphus
- Ardis
- Ziggy Blackstar (A Tribute To David Bowie)
