= Baja Prog – Live in Mexico '99 =

Baja Prog - Live in Mexico ’99

Live album by Quidam
- Released: 1999
- Recorded: during festival Baja Prog in Mexico, 1999.
- Genre: Progressive rock
- Length: 76:46
- Label: Musea Records

Quidam chronology
Sny aniołów (Angels' Dreams) (1998)	Baja Prog - Live in Mexico ’99 (1999)	The Time Beneath The Sky (2002)

Professional ratings
Review scores
Source	Rating
Allmusic	4/5 stars
DPRP	9/10 stars

Baja Prog – Live in Mexico ’99 is a live album of Polish progressive rock group Quidam, released 1999. It was recorded during the 1999 Baja Prog festival in Mexicali, Baja California, Mexico.

== Track listing ==
1. "Przebudzenie" – 2:40
2. "Głęboka rzeka" – 6:56
3. "Choćbym..." – 5:52
4. "Płonę / Niespełnienie" – 18:11
5. "Jest taki samotny dom" – 5:18
6. "Rhayader / Rhayader Goes to Town" – 9:35
7. "Sanktuarium" – 10:26
8. "Angels of Mine" – 5:41
9. "Child in Time" – 9:27

== Personnel ==
- Emila Derkowska – vocal, backing vocals
- Zbyszek Florek – piano, keyboards
- Maciej Meller – guitars
- Radek Scholl – bass guitar
- Jacek Zasada – flutes
- Rafał Jermakow – drums, percussions
