= ...bez półPRĄDU...halfPLUGGED... =

Live album by Quidam
- Released: 2006
- Recorded: live at Teatr Miejski, Inowrocław, 29 May 2006.
- Genre: Progressive rock
- Length: 51:23
- Label: Rock-Serwis
- Producer: Piotr Kosiński, Zbyszek Florek and Maciek Meller

Quidam chronology
The Fifth Season - Live In Concert (DVD) (2006)	...bez półPRĄDU...halfPLUGGED... (2006)	Alone Together (2007)

Professional ratings
Review scores
Source	Rating
DPRP	8/10 stars

...bez półPRĄDU...halfPLUGGED... is a live album of Polish progressive rock group Quidam, released 2006. It was recorded at Teatr Miejski, Inowrocław, 29 May 2006.

== Track listing ==
All tracks are written by Florek, Kossowicz, Meller, Wróblewski, and Ziólkowski, except where noted.

No.	Title	Length
1.	"Hands Off"	9:24
2.	"Queen of Moulin Rouge"	8:27
3.	"SuREvival"	5:58
4.	"Sanktuarium" (Derkowska, Florek, Meller, Szaserski)	7:44
5.	"Oldies But Goldies: List Z Pustyni I/Pod Powieka/Plone/Wesola/Jest Taki Samotny Dom/Niespelnienie/Gleboka Rzeka" (Derkowska, Florek, Jermakow, Lipko, Meller, Scholl, Szadkowski)	9:43
6.	"The Fifth Season"	10:34
7.	"Everything's Ended"	11:44
8.	"Not So Close"	10:05

== Personnel ==
- Zbyszek Florek – keyboards, backing vocals
- Maciek Meller – acoustic guitars, backing vocals
- Bartek Kossowicz – vocals, tambourine
- Mariusz Ziółkowski – bass guitar, acoustic guitar
- Maciek Wróblewski – drums, percussion
- Jacek Zasada – flutes, bass guitar
