= Overground Music =

Studio album by After Crying
- Released: 1990
- Genre: progressive rock
- Length: 40:13
- Language: English
- Label: Periferic
- Producer: László Glöoz

After Crying chronology
Overground Music (1990)	Koncert 1991 (1991)

Professional ratings
Review scores
Source	Rating
Allmusic	2/5 stars

Overground Music is the debut 1990 album (not counting the cassette-only albums released the previous year) from the Hungarian musical ensemble After Crying. It is sung in English, as opposed to their following albums (until 6), that featured lyrics in Hungarian.

== Track listing ==
All tracks are written by Csaba Vedres in collaboration with Péter Pejtsik, except track 4, with words written by Tomás Görgényi and Péter Pejtsik.

No.	Title	Length
1.	"European Things (Hommage à Frank Zappa)"	8:27
2.	"Don't Betray Me"	3:02
3.	"Confess Your Beauty"	6:50
4.	"Madrigal Love, Pt. 1"	2:14
5.	"...To Black..."	5:05
6.	"Madrigal Love, Pt. 2 (Over Every Sea)"	3:00
7.	"Madrigal Love, Pt. 3"	0:51
8.	"Shinin' (To the Powers of Fairyland)"	10:44
Total length:		40:13

== Personnel ==
- Csaba Vedres - piano, lead vocals (1,3,5,6), vocals and synthesizer
- Péter Pejtsik - cello, lead vocals (2,4) and vocals

Additional personnel:

- Kristóf Fogolyán - flute
- Zsolt Maroevich - viola
- Judit Andrejski - lead vocals (8) and vocals
- Pál Makovecz - trombone (2,5,6,8)
- Otto Rácz- oboe (1,5,8)
- Aladár Tüske - bassoon (1,5,6,8)
- Balázs Winkler - trumpet (1,2,5,6,8)
