= After Crying =

Hungarian musical ensemble

- Origin: Hungary
- Genres: Rock music ensemble classical music symphonic rock
- Years active: 1986-present
- Label: Periferic Records
- Members: Batky Zoltan - lead vocals Egervari Gabor - flute, narration, texts and thoughts, live sound, founding member Eros Csaba - piano keyboards Horváth András Ádám - guitars, iPad samplers Madai Zsolt - drums, percussion, vibraphone, member since 1998; Pejtsik Péter - composition, orchestration, cello, bass guitar, vocals, founding member Winkler Balazs - composition, orchestration, trumpet, keyboards.
- Website: aftercrying

After Crying is a Hungarian musical ensemble established in 1986 that composes and performs contemporary classical music or symphonic rock. They use instruments ranging from classical acoustical instruments like cello, trumpet, piano, and flute to the instruments of a modern rock band. They sometimes perform with traditional chamber or symphony orchestras. Their studio albums contain numerous variations in instruments and composition.

== 2023 lineup (alphabetical order) ==
(Hungarian names: Family names first)

- Bátky Zoltán (lead vocal, member since 2002)
- Egervári Gábor (flute, narration, texts and thoughts, live sound, founding member)
- Erős Csaba (piano, keyboards)
- Horváth András Ádám (guitars, iPad samplers)
- Madai Zsolt (drums, percussion, vibraphone, member since 1998)
- Pejtsik Péter (composition, orchestration, cello, bass guitar, vocals, founding member)
- Winkler Balázs (composition, orchestration, trumpet, keyboards. First appeared 1990–1991, regular member since 1992)

== Discography ==
1. Opus 1 (cassette) (1989) (cd reedition 2009)
2. 1989 (cassette) (1989) (cd reedition 2009)
3. Overground Music (1990)
4. Koncert 1991 (cassette) (1991)
5. Megalázottak és megszomorítottak (1992)
6. Föld és ég (1994)
7. De Profundis (1996)
8. Első évtized (1996)
9. 6 (1997)
10. Almost Pure Instrumental (1998)
11. Struggle for Life (2000)
12. Struggle for Life – essential (2000)
13. Bootleg Symphony (2001)
14. Show (2003)
15. Live [DVD] (2007)
16. Opus 1 (2009)
17. 1989 (2009)
18. Creatura (2011)
19. XXV Anniversary Concert (2013)
