= De Profundis (After Crying album) =

Studio album by After Crying
- Released: 1996
- Genre: Progressive rock
- Length: 74:12
- Language: Hungarian
- Label: Periferic

After Crying chronology
Föld és ég (1994)	De Profundis (1996)	Első évtized (1996)

Professional ratings
Review scores
Source	Rating
Allmusic	4/5 stars

De Profundis is the fourth album from the Hungarian music group After Crying, released in 1996.

== Track listing ==
No.	Title	Length
1.	"Bevezetés" (Pejtsik)	3:39
2.	"Modern idök - including: Az ötödik trombitaszó és Babilon pusztulása" (Pejtsik, Görgényi)	7:36
3.	"Az üstökös / Rondo II" (Pejtsik)	1:43
4.	"Stalker - including: Reménytelenül" (Winkler)	12:22
5.	"Stonehenge" (Pejtsik)	4:34
6.	"Külvárosi éj" (Torma)	3:34
7.	"Manók tánca" (Winkler)	5:00
8.	"Kifulladásig" (Torma)	5:18
9.	"De Profundis" (After Crying)	11:29
10.	"Jónás imája" (Winkler, Babits, Latinovits)	2:24
11.	"Elveszett város" (Torma)	1:56
12.	"Kisvasút" (Winkler)	2:03
13.	"Esküszegök" (Leon Boëlmann, Pejtsik, Görgényi)	8:13
14.	"40 másodperc" (After Crying)	0:40
15.	"A világ végén" (Pejtsik, Görgényi)	3:41
Total length:		74:12

== Personnel ==
- Gábor Egervári - vocals and flute
- László Gacs - drums and percussion
- Tamás Görgényi - vocals
- Péter Pejtsik - cello, bass and vocals
- Ferenc Torma - guitar, synthesizer and vocals
- Balázs Winkler - keyboards, trumpet and vocals

Additional musicians

- Judit Andrejszky - vocals (2, 15)
- Ferenc Csatos - trumpet (2, 4, 13)
- Ilona Csizmadia - oboe (2, 4, 11)
- János Dégi - trombone (2, 4, 13)
- Péter Erdey - horns (2, 4, 11, 13, 15)
- Zoltán Fekete - viola (9, 11, 15)
- László Hunyadi - bassoon (2, 7, 9, 11, 15)
- Gergely Kuklis - violin (9, 11, 15)
- János Mazura - tuba (2, 4, 11, 13)
- György Reé - clarinet and bass clarinet (2, 10, 11, 15)
- Mónika Szabó - flute (2, 7, 10, 11, 15)
- Orsolya Winkler - violin (9, 11, 15)
- String, Cello Section (2,11): Dobos Bernadett, Dvorák Lajos, Gál Béla.
- String, Viola Section (2,11): Bolyki András, Fekete Zoltán, Juhász Barna.
- String, Violin Section (2,11): Cutor Zsolt, Jász Pál, Kuklis Gergely, Szefcsik Zsolt, Szlávik Zsuzsanna, Winkler Orsolya.
