= SuREvival =

Studio album by Quidam
- Released: 2005
- Recorded: at Teatr Miejski and studio "Island", Inowrocław, February–March 2005
- Genre: Progressive rock
- Length: 54:48
- Label: Rock Serwis
- Producer: Piotr Kosiński, Zbyszek Florek and Maciek Melle

Quidam chronology
The Time Beneath The Sky (2002)	SuREvival (2005)	...bez półPRĄDU...halfPLUGGED... (2006)

Professional ratings
Review scores
Source	Rating
DPRP	(9/10)

SuREvival is the fourth studio album of Polish progressive rock group Quidam, released 2005. It is the first album after singer Emilia Derkowska and the whole rhythm section, bassist Radek Scholl and drummer Rafał Jermakow, left the band.

== Track listing ==
All songs have been composed by Zbysek Florek, Bartek Kossowicz, Maciek Meller, Maciek Wróblewski and Mariusz Ziólkowski.

1. "Airing" – 2:25
2. "Hands Off" – 9:25
3. "Not So Close" – 6:22
4. "The Fifth Season" – 9:45
5. "SurREvival" – 5:13
6. "Queen of Moulin Rouge" – 8:24
7. "Everything's Ended" – 13:14

== Personnel ==
- Zbyszek Florek – keyboards, mixing
- Maciek Meller – guitars
- Bartek Kossowicz – vocals, backing vocals
- Mariusz Ziółkowski – bass guitar
- Maciek Wróblewski – drums
- Jacek Zasada – flutes

=== Guests ===
- Robert "Myca" Kowalski – backing vocals "Hands off", "Not so close", "The fifth season"
- Grzegorz Nadolny – double-bass "The fifth season"
- Paweł "DJ Paulo" Molenda – scratching "Queen of Moulin Rouge"
