= Föld és ég =

Föld És Ég

Studio album by After Crying
- Released: 1994
- Genre: Progressive rock
- Length: 60:31
- Language: Hungarian
- Label: Periferic

After Crying chronology
Megalázottak és megszomorítottak (1992)	Föld És Ég (1994)	De Profundis (1996)

Professional ratings
Review scores
Source	Rating
AllMusic	3/5 stars

Föld És Ég is the third album from the Hungarian group After Crying. Released in 1994, it was their last album to feature founding member Csaba Vedres.

== Track listing ==
No.	Title	Length
1.	"Manticore érkezése I" (Vedres, Winkler)	1:50
2.	"Manticore érkezése II" (Egervári, Gacs, Pejtsik, Winkler)	6:37
3.	"Enigma" (Egervari, Winkler)	1:25
4.	"Rondo" (Vedres)	3:41
5.	"Zene Gitárra" (Torma)	3:21
6.	"Leltár" (Vedres)	4:03
7.	"Cisz-Dór koncertetüd" (Vedres)	3:23
8.	"Puer Natus in Betlehem" (Vedres)	6:03
9.	"Judás" (Egervári, Gacs, Görgényi, Pejtsik, Torma, Vedres, Winkler)	9:41
10.	"Bár éjszaka van" (Egervári, Gacs, Pejtsik, Torma, Vedres)	7:06
11.	"Kétezer év" (Egervári, Gacs, Görgényi, Pejtsik, Torma, Vedres)	13:21
Total length:		60:31

== Personnel ==
- Gábor Egervári - vocals and flute
- László Gacs - drums and percussion
- Péter Pejtsik - cello, bass and vocals
- Ferenc Torma - guitar and vocals
- Csaba Vedres - piano, synthesizer and vocals
- Balázs Winkler - trumpet, synthesizer and vocals
