= Mona Lisa (band) =

French progressive rock band

Mona Lisa Mona Lisa
- Origin: Orléans, France
- Genre: Progressive Rock
- Years active: 1973–1980; 1998–2000
- Past members: Christian Gallas; Gilles Solves; Jean-Paul Pierson; Jean-Luc Martin; Francis Poulet; Dominique Le Guennec; Pascal Jardon; Jean Bétin; Robert Morinière; Micheal Grandet; Philippe Maury; Guillaume de la Pilière; Benoït de Gency; Allain de Lille

Mona Lisa was a French progressive/symphonic rock band active in the 1970s, playing rock with theatrical vocals in the vein of Ange. In 1998, after almost 20 years of inactivity, the group reformed with three-quarters of the members of Versailles. Notable members were Dominique Le Guennec, Francis Poulet, Jean-Paul Pierson, Pascal Jardon and Jean-Luc Martin.

== Releases ==
- 1974 - L'escapade
- 1975 - Grimaces
- 1976 - Le petit violon de Monsieur Grégoire
- 1977 - Avant qu'il ne soit trop tard
- 1978 - Vers demain
- 1998 - De L'Ombre à la Lumière
- 2001 - Progfest 2000
