= Karmamoi =

Italian progressive rock

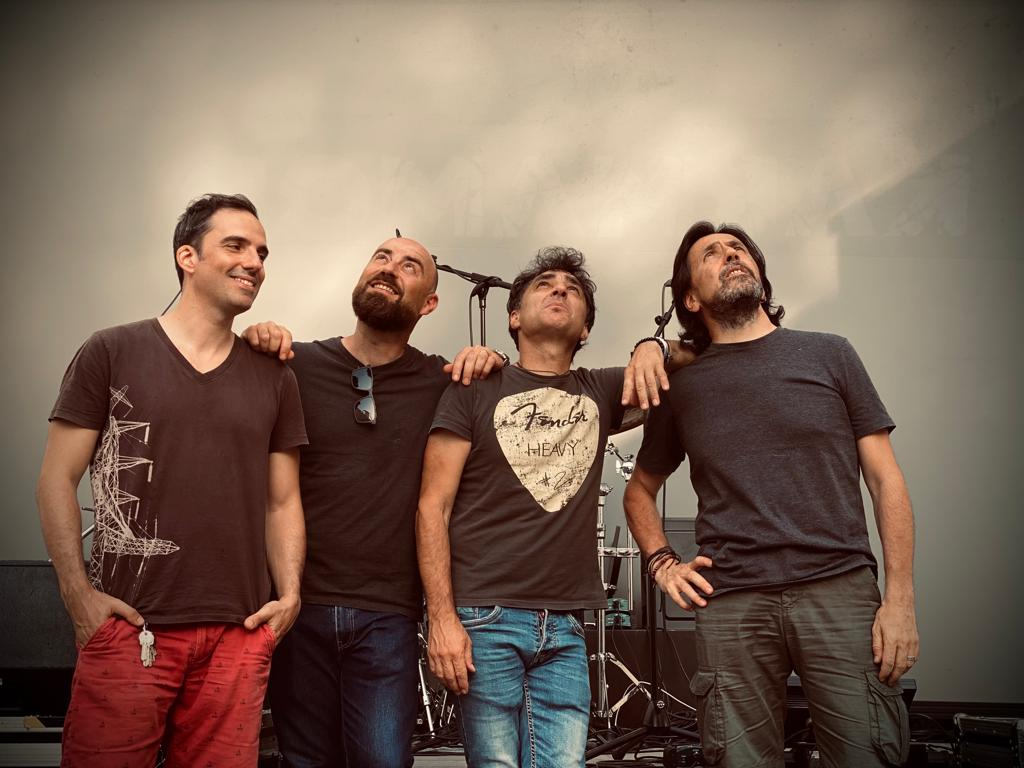

Background information
- Origin: Rome and Milan, Italy
- Genres: Progressive rock; neo-prog
- Years active: 2008–present
- Labels: Independent
- Members: Daniele Giovanonni; Valerio Sgargi; Alex Massari; Alessandro Cefalì
- Website: www.karmamoi.it

Karmamoi is an Italian progressive rock band led by Daniele Giovannoni.

== History ==
Giovannoni formed Karmamoi in 2008. Shortly after, he worked with the vocalist Serena Ciacci, guitarists Fabio Tempesta and Alex Massari and bassist Alessandro Cefalì, who completed the line-up.

In 2009 Karmamoi met Crisalide Edizioni, who believed in the project and together with the band began to work towards the release that summer of a single, "Venere", which generated positive responses from radio stations and the public. "Venere" was broadcast by many independent stations even beyond the Alps, which led the band to take part in the JIMI Festival de Marne in Paris. That same year, as well as a series of concerts in the bigger live venues of Rome, Karmamoi played in the M.e.i. festival in Faenza.

In May 2010 Karmamoi featured on the soundtrack of the short film by Paolo Budassi Cinque Note and began recording the tracks for their debut album. In January 2011 they released the self-titled Karmamoi. The album was accompanied by the video of "Vivo Desiderio", directed by Paolo Budassi.

In January 2011 the band performed in the Eurosonic showcase festival in Groningen and launched the album at Rising Love in Rome. They performed at the Rome Fnac and gave interviews and radio broadcasts. In September 2011 the band appeared in the Supersonic Festival and Naples's AWOP Festival. In 2012, the band released an acoustic EP entitled Entre Chien Et Loup, which launched at the Teatro Elsa Morante in Rome on 17 May 2012. Entre Chien Et Loup connects the pop proclivities of the debut album and their later rock/prog direction. The EP includes the new single "Stesa", which epitomizes the musical changes underway. In late 2013, Karmamoi released Odd Trip, featuring a single of the same name. The band launched the album played along Curved Air at "The Borderline" in London. "Odd Trip" has been a big step into Progressive Rock. Ciacci left the band to work on other projects.

Silence Between Sounds is their third album. Due to personnel changes, the album took over two years to complete. Karmamoi used this opportunity to follow a new musical path. They decided to keep the band without an official vocalist, and for this reason Silence Between Sounds features multiple singers, each of whom brought their own voice to the music. They featured instruments such as the cello, piano, flute, and clarinet. This change allowed them to balance traditional and modern progressive rock. Thematically, the piece attempts to understand the reasons for human failure.

Producer and engineer Mark Tucker (Jethro Tull) worked closely with Daniele as co-producer and mixing engineer. Karmamoi played at "Winter's End Festival" (UK).

In 2018, Karmamoi's fourth studio album, The Day Is Done, was released. Recorded in May 2018 at The Arc Abbey Studios (UK), published by Sonicbond, the album is a concept one, describing two brothers trying to find a better life in Europe who ultimately die in the Grenfell Tower fire.

As for the previous album Silence Between Sounds, the band involved Sara Rinaldi as vocalist. Also, Karmamoi involved guests such as Colin Edwin, the bassist of (Porcupine Tree and O.R.K.) and Geoff Leigh, flutist and saxophonist (Steven Wilson, Ex-Wise Heads, Henry Cow, and many others). Mark Tucker co-produced and sound engineered the album. Critically acclaimed and by prog fans, "The Day Is Done" allowed the band to be recognized for its unique sound and compositions. Karmamoi has been included by Prog-Sphere in a list as one of the 20 best Italian progressive rock bands. They played at "Rosfest" (Florida), DanFest (UK), "Black Water Festival" and "Progressivamente Festival" (Italy).

The band is working on a new album called ROOM 101 that will be released in spring 2021. Recorded in Rome and London (August – October 2020) and produced by Daniele Giovannoni, the album is inspired by the novel of George Orwell's Nineteen Eighty-Four. Once again, Karmamoi have involved some guests such as the pianist Adam Holzman (Steven Wilson, Miles Davies) and the violinist Steve Unruh.

2022: In March 2022 Karmamoi released a new single called "WHICH DREAMS" From April 2022 Valerio Sgargi is the new singer of the Band. On 25 June Karmamoi performed as the open act of "IQ" at the "Legend Club" in Milan and on 29 July 2022, Karmamoi released the single TAMED SHADOWS

2023: The sixth studio album by KARMAMOI called STRINGS FROM THE EDGE OF SOUND will be out on 1 September 2023. On 3 September 2023, the band will be performing at the most important Italian Prog Festival 2DAYS PROG+1 in Veruno.

== Band members ==
- Daniele Giovannoni – Composer, Drums, Keyboards
- Alex Massari – Guitars
- Alessandro Cefalì – Bass
- Valerio Sgargi - Composer, Vocal, Keyboards

== Discography ==
- Karmamoi (2011)
- Entre chien et loup (2012)
- Odd Trip (2013)
- Silence Between Sounds (2016)
- The Day Is Done (2018)
- Room 101 (2021)
- Which Dreams (single) Tamed Shadows (single) (2022)
- Strings from the Edge of Sound (1 September 2023)
