= As the World =

Studio album by Echolyn
- Released: March 7, 1995
- Recorded: February–June 1994
- Studios: Woodland (Nashville, Tennessee)
- Genre: Progressive rock
- Length: 69:18
- Label: Sony Music
- Producer: Glenn Rosenstein

Echolyn chronology
| ...And Every Blossom (1993) | As the World (1995) | When the Sweet Turns Sour (1996) |

Professional ratings
Review scores
| Source | Rating |
|---|---|
| Allmusic | 4.5/5 stars |

As the World is an album by the progressive rock band Echolyn, released in 1995, and it is their only release on a major label (Sony). It features many complex arrangements and vocal harmonies, showing at times the influence of classic progressive rock bands such as Rush, Gentle Giant, and Genesis.

== Album content ==
"All Ways The Same" is a short instrumental intro featuring a string ensemble composed and arranged by keyboardist Chris Buzby. The strings are accompanied by vocalizations by Echolyn themselves.

"As The World" begins in A minor with acoustic guitar and vocals with simple percussion. As bass and drums are added, vocal harmonies come into play, as well as organ continuo by Buzby. Toward the middle of the song, the syncopated vocals and contrapuntal instrumentation may remind the listener of Gentle Giant more so than this song, more than most other Echolyn pieces.

Tracks 7 through 11 comprise a suite entitled "Letters." "My Dear Wormwood" is based on The Screwtape Letters by author C.S. Lewis.

The album closer, "Never the Same," is their most requested song to play live. Guitarist/vocalist Brett Kull has commented that while the group is hailed for being extraordinarily "proggy", the song is a relatively simple one in 3/4 time. The song reflects the influences of The Beatles and Simon and Garfunkel more than the oft-cited progressive rock ones.

In 2000, the masters of As the World were returned to the band by record executive Michael Caplan, who originally signed them to Epic Records/Sony Music in 1994. The album was remastered in 2005 by Brett Kull and reissued with new artwork and packaging, plus a bonus DVD of their live performance at The Ritz in Detroit, MI, on Saturday, March 4, 1995, just days before the release of As the World. The DVD ends with a short interview with Brett and Ray by local rock journalist Devin McPherson. The other bands on the bill that night were fellow prog-rockers Discipline and two thrash bands, Cymonic Drive and Unseasonable Story.

== Track listing ==
All music is composed by Echolyn.

Disc One - As the World
| No. | Title | Lyrics | Length |
|---|---|---|---|
| 1. | "All Ways the Same" | instrumental | 0:36 |
| 2. | "As the World" | Brett Kull, Ray Weston | 4:50 |
| 3. | "Uncle" | Weston | 6:54 |
| 4. | "How Long I Have Waited" | Chris Buzby | 4:43 |
| 5. | "Best Regards" | Buzby, Kull | 4:11 |
| 6. | "The Cheese Stands Alone" | Buzby, Kull, Weston | 4:48 |
| 7. | "Prose" | instrumental | 1:45 |
| 8. | "A Short Essay" | Kull, Weston | 4:34 |
| 9. | "My Dear Wormwood" | Kull | 3:34 |
| 10. | "Entry 11-19-93" | Weston | 5:33 |
| 11. | "One for the Show" | Kull | 4:31 |
| 12. | "The Wiblet" | instrumental | 0:47 |
| 13. | "Audio Verité" | Weston | 4:27 |
| 14. | "Settled Land" | Kull, Weston | 5:42 |
| 15. | "A Habit Worth Forming" | Weston | 4:29 |
| 16. | "Never the Same" | Kull | 7:54 |

Disc Two: Live from the Ritz, Detroit, MI (March 4, 1995) (DVD)
| No. | Title | Length |
|---|---|---|
| 1. | "Intro (TCI Cablevision Channel 52)" | 0:22 |
| 2. | "Uncle" | 7:37 |
| 3. | "A Short Essay" | 5:01 |
| 4. | "My Dear Wormwood" | 3:42 |
| 5. | "Here I Am" | 4:04 |
| 6. | "21" | 5:18 |
| 7. | "The Cheese Stands Alone" | 5:14 |
| 8. | "As the World" | 5:17 |
| 9. | "Interview with Brett and Ray" | 3:45 |
| Total length: | | 42:00 |

== Personnel ==
Band members

- Christopher Buzby - keyboards, backing vocals
- Tom Hyatt - bass, Midi pedals
- Brett Kull - guitars, lead and backing vocals
- Paul Ramsey - drums, percussion
- Ray Weston - lead and backing vocals

Guest musicians

- Orchestra arranged and conducted by Christopher Buzby
- Connie Ellisor - strings section leader
- Connie Ellisor - violin
- Ted Madson - violin
- Catherine Ulmstead - violin
- Pamela Sixfin - violin
- David Davison - violin
- Cate Meyer - violin
- Katherine Shenk - violin
- Carol Ellisor - violin
- Jim Grosjean
- Alan Ulmstead - viola
- Kris Wilkinson - viola
- Bob Mason - cello
- Sam Levine - piccolo, flute, recorder

=== Production ===
- Produced by Glenn Rosenstein with echolyn
- Mixed by Jeff Balding
- Engineered by Rob Genadek
