= Quidam (band) =

Polish progressive rock band

- Origin: Inowrocław, Poland
- Genres: Progressive rock; neo-prog; symphonic rock; progressive folk; progressive metal
- Years active: 1991–2002; 2004–2014; 2025–present
- Labels: Musea, Rock Serwis, ARS Mundi
- Members: Maciej Meller; Zbigniew Florek; Jacek Zasada; Mariusz Ziółkowski; Maciej Wróblewski; Bartosz Kossowicz
- Past members: Radek Scholl; Rafał Jermakow; Waldemar Ciechanowski; Ewa Smarzyńska; Emila Derkowska; Damian Sikorski

Quidam is a Polish progressive rock band, evolving from the hard rock/blues trio Deep River, a band formed by Maciek Meller, Radek Scholl and Rafał Jermakow. When Zbyszek Florek and Ewa Smarzyńska joined the band, the original Quidam line up was complete. In this line-up the debut album Quidam was recorded between September 1995 and March 1996. The album was produced with guest appearances of three Collage members: Wojtek Szadkowski, Mirek Gil and Krzysiek Palczewski.

== Personnel ==
=== Current members ===
- Zbyszek Florek – keyboards, backing vocals
- Bartek Kossowicz – vocals
- Maciek Meller – guitars, backing vocals
- Maciek Wróblewski – drums
- Jacek Zasada – flutes, percussion
- Mariusz Ziółkowski – bass guitar

=== Former members ===
- Ewa Smarzyńska – flutes
- Emila Derkowska – vocal, backing vocals
- Rafał Jermakow – drums, percussion
- Radek Scholl – bass guitar
- Waldemar Ciechanowski – vocals

== Discography ==
=== Studio albums ===
Title	Album details	Peak chart positions
Title	Album details	POL
Quidam	Released: 11 March 1996; Label: ARS Mundi	–
Sny aniołów/ Angels' Dreams	Released: 1998; Label: Rock Serwis	–
Pod niebem czas/ The Time Beneath The Sky	Released: 1 May 2002; Label: Rock Serwis	–
SurREvival	Released: 6 June 2005; Label: Rock Serwis	–
Alone Together	Released: 5 November 2007; Label: Rock Serwis	14
Saiko	Released: 16 April 2012; Label: Rock Serwis	14
"—" denotes a recording that did not chart or was not released in that territory.

=== Live albums ===
Title	Album details	Peak chart positions
Title	Album details	POL
Baja Prog – Live in Mexico '99	Released: 1999; Label: Rock Serwis	—
The Fifth Season – Live In Concert	Released: 19 January 2006; Label: Metal Mind Productions	—
...bez półPRĄDU...halfPLUGGED...	Released: 9 October 2006; Label: Rock Serwis	—
Strong Together Live	Released: 26 March 2010; Label: Rock Serwis	16
"—" denotes a recording that did not chart or was not released in that territory.
