= The Fifth Season (Quidam album) =

Live album by Quidam
- Released: Jun 9, 2009
- Recorded: at Teatr Śląski im. Stanisława Wyspiańskiego, Katowice, November 15th 2005.
- Genre: Progressive rock
- Length: DVD: Concert - 106:12, Extras - 161:45, CD: 73:35
- Label: Metal Mind Productions

Quidam chronology
| Alone Together (2007) | The Fifth Season (2009) |

DVD cover
- DVD album cover

Professional ratings
Review scores
| Source | Rating |
|---|---|
| DPRP (DVD review) | (8.5/10) |
| DPRP (CD review) | (7/10) |

The Fifth Season is a live album of Polish progressive rock group Quidam, released 2009. It was recorded at Teatr Śląski im. Stanisława Wyspiańskiego, Katowice, November 15, 2005.

== Track listing ==
1. "Hands Off" (Florek, Kossowicz, Meller, Wróblewski, Ziólkowski) – 9:24
2. "Queen of Moulin Rouge" (Florek, Kossowicz, Meller, Wróblewski, Ziólkowski) – 8:27
3. "Surrevival" (Florek, Kossowicz, Meller, Wróblewski, Ziólkowski) – 5:58
4. "Sanktuarium" (Derkowska, Florek, Meller, Szaserski) – 7:44
5. "Oldies But Goldies: List Z Pustyni I/Pod Powieka/Plone/Wesola/Jest Taki Samotny Dom/Niespelnienie/Gleboka Rzeka" (Derkowska, Florek, Jermakow, Lipko, Meller, Scholl, Szadkowski) – 9:43
6. "The Fifth Season" (Florek, Kossowicz, Meller, Wróblewski, Ziólkowski) – 10:34
7. "Everything's Ended" (Florek, Kossowicz, Meller, Wróblewski, Ziólkowski) – 11:44
8. "Not So Close" (Florek, Kossowicz, Meller, Wróblewski, Ziólkowski) – 10:05

== Personnel ==
- Zbyszek Florek – keyboards
- Maciek Meller – guitars
- Bartek Kossowicz – vocals, backing vocals
- Mariusz Ziółkowski – bass guitar
- Maciek Wróblewski – drums
- Jacek Zasada – flutes
- Lukasz Bukowski – photography
- Adam Kozlowski – photography
