= Quidam (album) =

Studio album by Quidam
- Released: May 1996
- Genre: Progressive rock
- Label: Musea

Quidam chronology
Quidam (album) (1996)	Sny aniołów (Angels' Dreams) (1998)

Professional ratings
Review scores
Source	Rating
Allmusic	3/5 stars
Progreviews	(Not rated)

Quidam is the debut album of Polish Progressive rock group with the same name, released May 1996. The album was released at the First Warsaw Prog-Fest 1996. It contains nine songs of melodic symphonic rock.

== Track listing ==
1. "Sanktuarium" (Derkowska, Florek, Meller, Szajerski) – 8:57
2. "Choćbym..." (Florek, Meller, Scholl, Szadkowski) – 7:05
3. "Bajkowy" (Florek, Meller, Niewiadomska) – 3:42
4. "Głęboka Rzeka" (Chosinski, Derkowska, Florek, Meller) – 8:03
5. "Nocne Widziadła" (Florek, Meller) – 7:21
6. "Niespetnienie" (Florek, Meller, Szadkowski, Wojciechowski) – 9:44
7. "Warkocze" (Dziewialtowska-Gintowt, Florek, Meller) – 4:07
8. "Bijące Serca" (Florek, Meller) – 1:53
9. "Płonę" (Florek, Jermakow, Meller, Szadkowski) – 14:09

== Personnel ==
- Emila "Iza" Derkowska – vocals, cello, flute
- Ewa Smarzynska – flute
- Zbyszek "Zibi" Florek – keyboards
- Rafal "Makow" Jermakow – drums, percussion
- Maciek "Maciecz" Meller – guitars
- Radek "Tysy" Scholl – bass
