= Kasandrin Glas =

Serbian rock band

Background information
- Origin: Beočin, Serbia, FR Yugoslavia
- Genres: Neo-prog; gothic rock; neo-psychedelia
- Years active: 1993 – 1997
- Labels: Metropolis Records, Music YUser
- Past members: Nadežda Obrić; Slobodan Živković; Igor Olejar; Frane Malenica; Miroslav Bedov

Kasandrin Glas (Serbian Cyrillic: Касандрин Глас; trans. Cassandra's Voice) was a Serbian rock band formed in Beočin in 1993. Kasandrin Glas combined progressive and gothic rock and were a prominent act of the 1990s Serbian rock scene.

== History ==
The band was formed in Beočin in 1993 by Nadežda Obrić (vocals), Slobodan "Bob" Živković (guitar, synthesizer, bass guitar), Igor Olejar (bass guitar) and Frane Malenica (drums). They recorded their eponymous debut album Kasandrin glas and released it through Metropolis Records in 1995. The album, recorded at the Novi Sad Do-Re-Mi studio from September until December 1994, featured guest appearances by Aleksandar Banjac, playing keyboards on the track "Let 2" ("Flight No. 2"), Deže Molnar, playing clarinet on the same track, and Aleksandar Stamenković, playing keyboards on the tracks "Strah" ("Fear") and "Voda" ("Water"). The entire material was written by the band themselves and the album was produced by Živković and Melanica.

The follow-up, the album Neko kao ja (Someone Like Me), featuring a more guitar-oriented sound, was released in 1997 by Music YUser record label. The music for the album was written by Bedov, Živković and Malenica, and the album lyrics were written by Nataša Malenica. Produced by the former Pekinška Patka bassist Marinko "Mare" Vukomanović, the album featured a former Obojeni Program bassist Miroslav "Micke" Bedov as the new band member. The album, recorded at Veternik studio Matrix during 1996, featured the guest appearances by the politician Nenad Čanak, playing minimoog on the track "Labud" ("The Swan"), and Miroslav Marelj, playing guitar on the track "Ptica" ("The Bird"). After the album release, the band ceased to exist.

== Discography ==
=== Studio albums ===
- Kasandrin glas (1995)
- Neko kao ja (1997)
