= Suffocating the Bloom =

- Suffocating the Bloom (1992)

Studio album by echolyn
- Released: November 28, 1992
- Genre: Progressive rock
- Length: 63:39
- Label: Bridge Records
- Producer: Echolyn

Echolyn chronology
echolyn (1991)	Suffocating the Bloom (1992)	...And Every Blossom (1993)

Professional ratings
Review scores
Source	Rating
AllMusic	4.5/5 stars

Suffocating the Bloom is second full-length studio album by the progressive rock band Echolyn. The album was released on November 28, 1992, at a release party at the 23 East Cabaret in Ardmore, Pennsylvania.

Recording for Suffocating the Bloom began at the William Bolten Dixon American Legion Post No. 10 on July 15, 1992. After two days, the recording process moved to the band's own Farmhouse Studio. Recording was completed on August 27 at Forge Recording Studio. Mixing was completed at Forge in October 1992.

From the Gardener's Guide, a printed companion to the album:

We held a release party at the 23 East Cabaret in Ardmore, Pennsylvania. There were 400 people there that night and we sold over 600 CDs. I remember our parents and girlfriends coming to the club early to lend a hand. We decorated the entire club with flowers. Carnations were fixed to the rafters and placed on stage. Mr. Weston, Ray's dad, wore a tuxedo and handed out roses to everyone attending. The place looked great. Our light show was homemade, but definitely effective. We also ran movies during some of the songs and "Velveteen" always closed the show.

Just one day earlier, we were at Forge Recording Studios packing the CD. If we didn't package Suffocating the Bloom ourselves, it would not have been ready for the release party. We sat in a circle in the lounge and started a production line. CDs were placed in trays, tray cards into jewel cases, booklets were folded and inserted into their proper place. The process took all day to complete.

— Greg Kull

According to vocalist Ray Weston, the 28-minute epic, Suite for the Everyman, was "an explosion of emotion built up by the release of our first CD. Only to have it rejected by all the labels solicited. It's a basic single finger salute to those who said it could not be done. About sticking with integrity of your ideals." According to guitarist/vocalist Brett Kull, their initial intent was to write a second part to "Shades" from their debut album, but it morphed into the multi-part epic that closed out Suffocating the Bloom.

The first 1,000 copies of Suffocating the Bloom had silver discs with black print, including a few spelling mistakes ("Winterthru" is printed as two words and "Memoirs from Between" is labeled as "Memories from Between"). The second run of 1,000, produced approximately four months later, included red discs with yellow print and all mistakes corrected. A third run of 500 was printed in the spring of 1995 and contained all-black discs.

In 2000, echolyn received their master recordings back from Sony Music. They were hand-delivered to the band by record exec Michael Caplan at the Theater of Living Arts in Philadelphia in late June 2000 where the band was opening for prog-rock supergroup Transatlantic. This provided the band the opportunity to remaster and reissued the album as it had been out of print for close to eight years. The band pressed approximately 6,000 copies of the remaster in late 2000 with updated artwork and packaging.

== Track listing ==
No.	Title	Length
1.	"21"	5:49
2.	"Winterthru"	3:45
3.	"Memoirs From Between"	8:01
4.	"Reaping the Harvest"	1:41
5.	"In Every Garden"	4:39
6.	"A Little Nonsense"	4:20
7.	"The Sentimental Chain"	1:40
8.	"One Voice"	5:20
9.	"Here I Am"	5:21
10.	"Cactapus"	2:51

A Suite for the Everyman (28:13)

No.	Title	Length
11.	"Only Twelve"	1:17
12.	"A Cautious Repose"	4:55
13.	"Bearing Down"	3:49
14.	"Cash Flow Shuffle"	0:39
15.	"Mr. Oxy Moron"	3:23
16.	"Twelve's Enough"	2:21
17.	"I Am the Tide"	1:15
18.	"Cannoning in B Major"	1:19
19.	"Picture Perfect"	0:55
20.	"Those That Want to Buy"	6:45
21.	"Suffocating the Bloom"	4:03

== Personnel ==
Band Members

- Ray Weston – lead vocals
- Brett Kull – guitars, lead and backing vocals
- Christopher Buzby – keyboards, vocals
- Paul Ramsey – drums, percussion
- Tom Hyatt – bass, MIDI pedals

Guest musicians

- Katharine Shenk – violin
- Richard Casimir – violin
- Jeffrey E. Meyers – violin
- Elizabeth C. Detweiler – viola
- Kimberly Shenk – cello
- Laura Anthony – flute
- Heather Groll – flute
- Dainis Roman – alto saxophone
- Jim Dwyer – marching snares
- Tom Kelly – marching snares
