= Il Trono dei Ricordi =

Italian Progressive Rock Band

Il Trono Dei Ricordi (the Throne of Memories) are an Italian progressive rock band of the 1990s, who released two albums, MCCCXX in 1993, followed by Il Trono Dei Ricordi in 1994, an album of songs setting the words of William Blake. They were influenced by Genesis, Marillion and ELP.

== MCCCXX ==
In 1993 they released MCCCXX - Milletrecentoventi, containing three tracks,

1. Intro-Excalibur (4:27)
2. Il Campo Dei Miracoli (5:06)
3. Maschera Nel Buio (14:18)

== Il Trono dei Ricordi ==
The album sets extensive passages from Blake's prophetic books, including Visions of the Daughters of Albion and the Book of Urizen. It also sets The Little Black Boy from Songs of Innocence and Experience.

1. "The King Of Memories" (19:59)
2. "A Memorable Fancy" (4:14)
3. "On The Rising Sun" (13:34)
4. "Visions Of The Daughters Of Albion" (18:03)

== Personnel ==
- Alessandro Lamuraglia – keyboards
- Erik Landley – bass, saxophone
- Stefano Cupertino – electronics and effects
- Paolo Lamuraglia – guitars
- Alberto "The Wizard" Mugnaini – vocals

Guests:

- Fabrizio Morganti – drums
- Fransesco Bocciardi – bouzouki on “The King Of Memories”
