= Sny aniołów (Angels' Dreams) =

Sny aniołów (Angels' Dream)

Studio album by Quidam
- Released: 1998
- Recorded: at "JM Audio" in Niepołomice, February 1998.
- Genre: Progressive rock
- Length: 50:57
- Label: Musea Records; Rock Serwis
- Producer: Piotr Kosiński; Quidam, Paweł Skura

Quidam chronology
Quidam (1996)	Sny aniołów (Angels' Dream) (1998)	Baja Prog - Live in Mexico '99 (1999)

Professional ratings
Review scores
Source	Rating
AllMusic	2.5/5 stars
DPRP	(8/10)

Sny aniołów (Angels' Dreams) is the second studio album of Polish progressive rock group Quidam, released 1998. It was released simultaneously in Poland by Rock-Serwis and in the rest of the world by Musea Records. The latter version was retitled Angels' Dreams and featured re-recorded vocals in English. The album introduced Jacek Zasada as new flute player, replacing Ewa Smarzynska.

== Track listing ==
1. "Przebudzenie" (Derkowska, Florek, Jermakow, Meller, Scholl, Zasada) – 1:42
2. "Moje Anioly" (Derkowska, Florek, Jermakow, Meller, Scholl) – 4:21
3. "Morelowy Sen" (Derkowska, Florek, Jermakow, Meller, Scholl) – 5:17
4. "Wesola" (Derkowska, Florek, Jermakow, Meller, Scholl) – 6:59
5. "Beznogi Maly Ptak" (Derkowska, Florek, Jermakow, Meller, Scholl, Wilkowski) – 4:06
6. "Lza" (Derkowska, Florek, Jermakow, Meller, Scholl, Wilkowski) – 4:56
7. "Pod Powieka" (Derkowska, Florek, Jermakow, Meller, Scholl) – 13:57
8. "Przebudzenie (Swit Nadziei)" (Derkowska, Florek, Jermakow, Meller, Scholl) – 4:07
9. "Jest Taki Samotny Dom (There Is Such A Lonesome House)" (Cugowski, Lipko, Sikorski) – 5:31

The track listing of the English version:

1. "Awakening" – 1:42
2. "Angels Of Mine" – 4:21
3. "An Apple Dream" – 5:17
4. "Cheerful" – 6:59
5. "Little Bird With No Legs" – 4:06
6. "One Small Tear" – 4:56
7. "Behind My Eyes" – 13:57
8. "Awakening (Dawn Of Hope)" – 4:07
9. "There Is Such A Lonesome House" – 5:31

== Personnel ==
- Emilia Derkowska – vocal, backing vocals, cello
- Zbyszek Florek – piano, keyboards
- Maciej Meller – guitars
- Jacek Zasada – flutes
- Radek Scholl – bass guitar
- Rafał Jermakow – drums, percussions

=== Guest musician ===
- Witold Ekielski – oboe in "Beznogi mały ptak", "Łza", "Pod Powieką"
- Michał Wojciechowski – bassoon in "Beznogi mały ptak"
- Małgorzata Lachowicz – violin in "Jest taki samotny dom"
- Karolina Chwistek – violin in "Jest taki samotny dom"
- Magdalena Wróbel – viola in "Jest taki samotny dom"
- Dominika Miecznikowska – cello in "Jest taki samotny dom"
