= Cast (Mexican band) =

Mexican rock band

- Origin: Mexicali, Baja California, Mexico
- Genres: Progressive rock; Symphonic rock
- Years active: 1978–present
- Label: Musea
- Members: Alfonso Vidales; Carlos Humarán; Antonio Bringas; Claudio Cordero; Bobby Vidales; Roberto Izzo; Lupita Acuña
- Website: https://www.castofficial.com/

Cast are a rock band from Mexico. Formed in 1978, they specialize in progressive rock, similar in style to early Genesis. Their music focuses strongly on keyboards, guitars and vocals. The band host an annual progressive rock festival called Baja Prog in Mexicali, Baja California, Mexico, which features bands from around the world.

== Band members ==
- Alfonso Vidales – keyboards
- Lupita Acuña – backing vocals
- Roberto Izzo – violin
- Bobby Vidales – lead vocals
- Carlos Humarán – bass
- Antonio Bringas – drums
- Claudio Cordero – electric guitar

== Discography ==
- Landing in a Serious Mind (1994/2005)
- Sounds of Imagination (1994)
- Third Call (1994)
- Four Aces (1995)
- Endless Signs (1995)
- Beyond Reality (1996)
- A View of Cast (1996) (compilation)
- Angels and Demons (1997)
- Baja Prog 98 (live) (1998)
- Tema 98 (1998)
- A Live Experience (1999)
- Imaginary Window (1999)
- Legacy (2000) (dvd)
- Laguna de Volcanes (2000) (compilation)
- Castalia (2001) (live)
- Infinity (2002)
- Al-Bandaluz (2003)
- Nimbus (2004)
- Pyramid of the Rain (2005) (compilation)
- Legado (live DVD) (2006)
- Mosaïque (2006)
- Com.Unión (2007)
- Originallis (2008)
- Art (2011)
- Arsis (2014)
- Cast Vida (2015)
- Power and Outcome (2017)
- Vigesimus (2021)
