= Shub-Niggurath (band) =

Background information
- Origin: Paris, France
- Genres: Progressive rock; experimental rock; free improvisation; Zeuhl; Rock in Opposition
- Years active: 1982–1995

Shub-Niggurath was a French rock band founded in 1982 by Alain Ballaud, and remained active until Ballaud's death from cancer in 1995. The band is named after one of the deities in Cthulhu Mythos created by the American horror writer H. P. Lovecraft.

The band was created after the bands Aspara and Gorgonus were merged together. Ann Stewart and Franck W. Fromy from the former, Véronique Verdier, Jean-Luc Hervé, and Allain Ballaud from the latter. Drummers had to be changed often, due to the difficulty of certain compositions, which were at times too free-form, or too strictly written at others.

Their debut album was Les Morts Vont Vite, released in 1986 by Musea label, received critical acclaim for its innovative avant-garde inclinations, and major developments influenced by Magma's "Zeuhl" style.

Their self-titled demo tape has been reissued on CD and Vinyl in 2018 by the label Soleil Zeuhl.

== Band members ==
- Alain Ballaud: Bass (all albums)
- Franck Coulaud: Drums, Percussion (albums 1 & 4)
- Franck W. Fromy: Guitars (albums 1 & 4), Percussion (album 4)
- Jean-Luc Hervé: Piano, Organ & Harmonium (albums 1, 2 & 4), Guitars (albums 2 & 3)
- Ann Stewart: Vocals (albums 1 & 4)
- Véronique Verdier: Trombone (albums 1-4)
- Michel Kervinio: Drums, Percussion (albums 1 & 2)
- Sylvette Claudet: Vocals (album 2)
- Edward Perraud: Drums, Percussion (album 2)

== Discography ==
- Les Morts Vont Vite (Fr. "The Dead Go Fast") (1986)
- Live (1989)
- C'Étaient De Très Grands Vents (Fr. "Winds Were Very Great") (1991)
- Testament (1994)
- Introduction (2009, slightly different reissue of the self-titled Shub-Niggurath demo tape originally released in 1982)

== See also ==
- Zeuhl
- Progressive rock
- Experimental rock
