= Solaris (band) =

Progressive rock band from Hungary

Solaris is a Hungarian progressive rock band formed in 1980. Their music has a strong melodic content, often with Eastern European themes, and use of dynamics. There is interplay among the lead instruments of flute, guitar and keyboard, which is used regularly for extended thematic development. Rather than emphasising solos for the various instruments, the band employs them together within the context of musical development.

The band is named after Stanisław Lem's philosophical science fiction novel, Solaris. Their first album's title, Marsbéli Krónikák ('Martian Chronicles'), is named after a famous novel of Ray Bradbury. The members have said that they were influenced by these, and other science fiction books.

The majority of Solaris' songs are instrumentals. The first track on their first album Marsbéli Krónikák is an exception, with a few lines spoken over the music. The pitch-shifting, distortion, and album's theme have led many listeners to assume that the voice-over is in a putative Martian language, but it's actually in Hungarian: "Megrepedt tükrök (Cracked mirrors) / Kormos acélfalak (Sooty steel walls) / Halott szeméthegyek (Dead piles of garbage) / És szennyes tavak (And polluted lakes) / Azt mondod, itt élt valaha az ember? (Do you say mankind used to live here?)".

The song "Egészséges Optimizmus" ('Healthy Optimism') from the SOLARIS 1990 LP appears in several tracks on the later album Nostradamus: Próféciák könyve.

From 1986 to 1990, members of Solaris formed a new band, named Napoleon Boulevard, with singer Lilla Vincze. The band had a more mainstream rock sound, and released five successful albums.

In June 2003, Attila Kollár said in an interview that the band is still active, and they will start working on a new studio album that year.

Following their studio albums and a live double CD recorded in 1995 during the Progfest in Los Angeles, the band also started a three-volume "Official Bootleg" – or "Archív" [Archive] – series. These contain previously unreleased recordings of mainly live material. The title track of the second volume ("NOAB") was assembled from multiple live recordings. The composition was originally intended to appear on the first album, but has never been recorded in the studio.

In December 2007, drummer László Gömör told Alternative Press magazine that "the band has made few attempts to reunite and it seems unlikely (Solaris) will reunite."

A studio album Martian Chronicles II was released on October 26, 2014.

Album Nostradamus - Returnity was released in 2019.

The double album Marsbéli krónikák III (The Martian Chronicles III), subtitled "I or AI" was released October 7, 2024.

== Members ==
- Erdész, Róbert - keyboards (1980-)
- Kollár, Attila - flute (1980-)
- Gömör, László - drums (1982-)
- Kisszabó, Gábor - bass (1980-1982,1995-)
- Bogdán, Csaba - guitars (1981-1982,1995-)

== Past members ==
- Cziglán, István (deceased 1998) - guitars (1980-1998)
- Rauschenberger, Ferenc - drums (1981-1982)
- Seres, Attila - bass (1980)
- Tóth, Vilmos (deceased 2013) - drums (1980-1981)
- Pócs, Tamás - bass (1982-2011)

== Discography ==
Studio albums

- Marsbéli Krónikák (Martian Chronicles) (LP), 1984
- SOLARIS 1990 (double LP, double CD), 1990/1996
- Nostradamus: Próféciák könyve (Nostradamus: Book of Prophecies) (CD), 1999
- Martian Chronicles II, 2014
- Nostradamus - Returnity, 2019
- Marsbéli krónikák III (The Martian Chronicles III): I or AI, 2024

Singles and Extended Plays

- Solaris (SP), 1980
- Counterpoint (SP), 1981
- Marsbéli krónikák III (The Martian Chronicles III) (EP), 2022

Live albums

- Live in Los Angeles (double CD), 1996
- Solaris archív 1. - Back to the roots... (Az első idők...) (CD), 2000
- Solaris archív 2. - NOAB (CD), 2005
- Nostradamus - Live in Mexico (concert CD+DVD), 2007
- Live in Los Angeles (DVD), 2010
- Martian Chronicles live, Koncert a Művészetek Palotájában, 2014
