= 6 (After Crying album) =

Studio album by After Crying
- Released: 1997
- Genre: progressive rock
- Length: 73:44
- Language: English, Hungarian
- Label: Periferic Records

After Crying chronology
| Első évtized (1996) | 6 (1997) | Almost Pure Instrumental (1998) |

Professional ratings
Review scores
| Source | Rating |
|---|---|
| Allmusic | 3/5 stars |

6 is the sixth album from the Hungarian musical ensemble After Crying, released in 1997.

== Track listing ==
I. Save Our Souls
| No. | Title | Music | Length |
|---|---|---|---|
| 1. | "Save Our Souls" | Winkler | 2:49 |

II. Panem et Circenses
| No. | Title | Lyrics | Music | Length |
|---|---|---|---|---|
| 2. | "Fun Fair Land Open" | Görgényi | Pejtsik, Vedres, Görgényi | 4:33 |
| 3. | "Providence (Dance with the Sleep-Walker Marionettes)" | Egervári | Winkler | 2:44 |
| 4. | "Salto Mortale II (Trash Flow)" | Görgényi, Pejtsik | Görgényi, Pejtsik, Winkler | 8:46 |
| 5. | "Sleepin' Chaplin" | | Winkler | 2:40 |
| 6. | "Madrigal Love, Pt.4 (Casanova)" | Görgényi | Pejtsik | 4:13 |
| 7. | "Final (Big Fun Fair Finale)" | | Pejtsik | 6:26 |

III. Intermezzo
| No. | Title | Music | Length |
|---|---|---|---|
| 8. | "Intermezzo" | Winkler | 2:49 |

IV. Farewell To 20th Century
| No. | Title | Lyrics | Music | Length |
|---|---|---|---|---|
| 9. | "Viaduct" | | Winkler | 4:36 |
| 10. | "Salto Mortale I (Helpless)" | Görgényi | Pejtsik | 3:33 |
| 11. | "Enigma II" | Görgényi | Torma | 5:41 |
| 12. | "Struggle For Life" | József Attila | Pejtsik, Görgényi | 9:12 |
| 13. | "The Man And The Rock / American Express" | Weöres Sándor | Winkler | 4:56 |

V. Conclusion
| No. | Title | Lyrics | Music | Length |
|---|---|---|---|---|
| 14. | "Conclusion (A tribute to Keith Emerson)" | Görgényi | Pejtsik | 10:46 |
| Total length: | | | | 73:44 |

== Personnel ==
- Gábor Egervári - vocals and flute
- Görgényi Tamás - vocals
- Péter Pejtsik - cello, bass, synthesizer, vocals and programming
- Ferenc Torma - electric and acoustic guitar, bass and programming
- Balázs Winkler - trumpet, keyboards, percussion and programming

Additional musicians:

- Ferenc Szabó - drums and percussion
- Judit Andrejszky - vocals
- Láslo Koós - basso profundo
- Zoltán Lengyel - grand piano
- Pál Makovecz - trombone
- Mihály Borbély - soprano, tenor and alto saxophone
- Csaba Klenján - baritone saxophone
- Péter Erdey - horns
- Mónika Szabó - flute
- Ottó Rácz - oboe
- György Reé - clarinet
- Vilmos Horváth - bassoon
