= Deus ex Machina (Italian band) =

Deus Ex Machina (band) is an Italian progressive rock group. Members include Claudio Trotta (drums), Alessandro Porreca (bass), Maurino Collina (guitar), Alessandro Bonetti (violin) Luigi Ricciardiello (keyboards) and Alberto Piras (vocals).

== Discography ==
- Gladium Caeli (1990)
- Deus Ex Machina (1992)
- De Republica (1994)
- Non Est Ars Quae ad Effectum Casus Venit (live) (1995)
- Diacronie Metronomiche (live) (1996)
- Equilibrismo da Insofferenza (1998)
- Cinque (2002)
- Imparis (2008)
- Devoto (2016)
