= Salem Hill (band) =

American progressive rock band

Salem Hill is an American progressive rock band, based in the Nashville, Tennessee area.

== Members ==
- Michael Dearing: vocals, guitars, keys
- Carl Groves: vocals, guitars, keys
- Patrick Henry: vocals, bass
- Kevin Thomas: vocals, drums

== Former members ==
- Michael Ayers: vocals, keys

== Discography ==
- The Unseen Cord/Thicker Than Water (2015)
- Pennies In The Karma Jar (2010)
- Mystery Loves Company (Live DVD) (2005)
- Mimi’s Magic Moment (2005)
- Be (Oarfin Records, 2003)
- Puppet Show (2003)
- Different Worlds (2001 Cyclops Records, Remaster of Salem Hill II)
- Catatonia (2001)
- Not Everybody's Gold (2000)
- The Robbery Of Murder (1999)
- Salem Hill II (1994)
- Salem Hill (1993)
