= Semiramis (band) =

Semiramis is an Italian progressive rock band who produced one LP in 1973, Dedicato a Frazz.

== History ==
The band was formed in 1970 by Maurizio Zarrillo (keyboards) and two cousins Marcello Reddavide (bass) and Memmo Pulvano (drums); they were all 15 years old. Two years later they were joined by 16-year-old Michele Zarrillo who replaced former singer Maurizio Macioce. They played in some live, open-air concerts in Rome until Pulvano left and Paolo Faenza joined on drums.

Their only album, Dedicato a Frazz, released by Trident Records in 1973 was commercially unsuccessful, but later became regarded as a classic Italian progressive rock album. The album featured a cover by Gordon Faggetter. According to a favorable review, "Semiramis pile it on from every angle. Synths go awry, voices scream, guitars go a hundred miles a second, drums jettison you across the room. How could a group compose so many ideas? There are literally 15 albums on this!"

After the band split up, singer and guitarist Michele Zarrillo joined a later incarnation of Il Rovescio della Medaglia. In the 1980s he began a successful solo career as a pop music singer. He has released 10 full-length studio albums, as well as a host of singles.

== Lineup ==
- Michele Zarrillo (guitar, vocals)
- Maurizio Zarrillo (keyboards)
- Marcello Reddavide (bass)
- Paolo Faenza (drums, percussion, vibes)
- Giampiero Artegiani (acoustic guitar, synth)
