= Echolyn =

American progressive rock band

- Origin: Pennsylvania, U.S.
- Genre: Progressive rock
- Years active: 1989–1995, 2000–present
- Labels: Velveteen, Sony Music
- Members: Brett Kull; Ray Weston; Chris Buzby; Jordan Perlson
- Past members: Tom Hyatt; Paul Ramsey; Jesse Reyes
- Website: www.echolyn.com

Echolyn is an American progressive rock band based in eastern Pennsylvania.

== History ==
=== Origins and first phase (1989–1995) ===
Echolyn was formed in 1989 when guitarist Brett Kull and drummer Paul Ramsey, members of a recently split cover band called Narcissus, joined with keyboardist Chris Buzby to form a new band to focus on original songs. They were soon joined by fellow Narcissus veteran Ray Weston on vocals and bassist Jesse Reyes, and quickly began playing live and recording their eponymous debut album, which was released in 1991. During the recording of that album, Reyes was replaced on bass by Tom Hyatt.

With this lineup, Echolyn recorded a second album, Suffocating the Bloom, and a four-song EP, ...And Every Blossom, and with these releases attracted the attention of Sony Music. In 1994, Echolyn was signed to a multi-album deal on Sony's Epic Records label with their major-label debut, As the World, released in March 1995.

However, the label did not provide support for the band to tour in promotion of the album, therefore the band was forced to promote As the World on their own. Later in 1995, Sony dropped Echolyn from the label due to poor sales of As the World. Disillusioned, the band split up, but an album of demos and live tracks was released in 1996 called When the Sweet Turns Sour (featuring a cover of the early Genesis track "Where the Sour Turns to Sweet", which Sony refused to allow to include on a Magna Carta Genesis tribute album entitled Supper's Ready).

=== Interim (1996–2000) ===
Ray Weston, Brett Kull and Paul Ramsey formed a new, semi-progressive rock band called Still and released a disc called Always Almost in early 1996, on the independent Pleasant Green label. Later that year the band changed its name to Always Almost, releasing a much more progressive-oriented album entitled God Pounds His Nails, also on Pleasant Green. Over a two-year period they played many shows in the Philadelphia area and Baltimore, as well as two shows in Atlanta and Athens, Georgia.

Ray Weston joined progressive rock band The Dark Aether Project in 1998. Over the next two years he toured with the group and appeared on the 1999 album Feed the Silence.

Chris Buzby formed a jazz-influenced progressive rock band called Finneus Gauge with guitarist Scott McGill, bass player Chris Eike, vocalist Laura Martin, and drummer Jonn Buzby. They released two albums, More Once More (1996) and One Inch of the Fall (1998).

It was during this time that Echolyn were asked by Magna Carta Records to contribute to a Jethro Tull tribute album. Weston, Kull, and Ramsey (who owned the Echolyn trademark name) chose "One Brown Mouse", recorded the song, and the album To Cry You a Song: A Collection of Tull Tales was released on July 2, 1996.

=== Second phase (2000–2017) ===
Echolyn formally reformed – without Tom Hyatt – in the spring of 2000. Ray Weston took over bass duties and new member Jordan Perlson (a Berklee College of Music graduate and former student of Buzby) supplemented Ramsey on drums and percussion. This lineup produced the 2000 album Cowboy Poems Free, a loose concept album centering on Americana, and the 2002 album mei, which contains only a single, 50-minute-long track.

After playing as a guest with the band in 2002 and early 2003, including their first appearance at the North East Art Rock Festival in June 2002, Tom Hyatt officially rejoined Echolyn. The first album from the fully reformed lineup was The End Is Beautiful, released in September 2005. Subsequently, the band embarked on their first European tour. They also contributed a new track called "15 Days" to the benefit album After the Storm (NEARfest Records), in support of the survivors of the Hurricane Katrina disaster. The band was later featured at the inaugural Festival des Musiques Progressives de Montréal in Quebec, Canada, in September 2006.

2008 saw the release of a newly remastered Cowboy Poems Free as well as solo work from Brett Kull and a second performance at NEARfest. Echolyn continued to tour sporadically through 2009.

On June 19, 2012, Echolyn released a new album. It was untitled but referred to informally by the band as just 'echolyn' or 'Window' and sold as both a double CD and as a limited edition two-disc vinyl release (500 copies). Subsequently, the band released seven additional tracks through Bandcamp, including a live track, a remix of "15 Days", outtakes from the album such as "Accumulated Blur", "Moments with No Sound", and other songs written in the same period as the album but not completed in time, including "Crows Fly By" and "Another Stone".

On July 1, 2015, Echolyn opened up a two-week pre-sales window for their eighth studio album, I Heard You Listening, with a public release date of July 31, 2015. Initial reviews of the album, like on The Progressive Aspect website, were very positive. The album was given its debut on the ProgScape Radio Internet radio program on July 15, 2015.

=== Third phase (2018–present) ===
In early 2018, Chris Buzby, Brett Kull, and Ray Weston began writing sessions for a new Echolyn album. These sessions continued over the next two years with updates posted to the band's official Facebook page from time to time. The short videos feature the band playing parts of some of the new songs on which they had been working.

On March 7th, 2025, Echolyn released two albums titled Time Silent Radio II and Time Silent Radio vii. The albums featured original members Ray Weston, Christopher Buzby, and Brett Kull, along with drummer Jordan Perlson. The Prog Report said this about the albums, "Thirty years after Echolyn’s major-label debut (the landmark 1995 neoprog classic “As the World”), the band has produced the best albums of its 36-year career. Both records have been in the works for nearly a decade, but the wait was worth it."

== Musical style ==
The members of Echolyn have cited Genesis, Wilco, Gentle Giant, Yes, Steely Dan, Jethro Tull, Igor Stravinsky, Electric Light Orchestra, and The Beatles as influences.

While the band's style has varied over the years, those influences have been consistently reflected in their music. Intricate guitar leads, unorthodox harmonic structures influenced by modern classical music, and complex contrapuntal vocal passages have remained significant aspects of the musical sound of Echolyn.

The albums they recorded before their 1996 breakup sounded more like "classic" progressive rock, with layered keyboards and extended arrangements. Following their reformation, they have streamlined their style significantly, emphasizing strong, tightly constructed songwriting and more prominent rhythmic grooves, while maintaining much of the subtle sophistication that has caused their music to be labeled "progressive."

Their self-titled 2012 double album features extended arrangements, rhythmic complexity and integration of the symphonic, "retro" progressive rock sound heard in their earlier works, while also referencing American styles such as country and blues.

== Personnel ==
Current lineup

- Ray Weston – lead and backing vocals, bass
- Brett Kull – guitars, lead and backing vocals
- Chris Buzby – keyboards, backing vocals
- Jordan Perlson – drums, percussion (as a full member on Cowboy Poems Free, Time Silent Radio II & vii and as guest musician on mei)

Former members

- Paul Ramsey – drums, percussion
- Tom Hyatt – bass
- Jesse Reyes – bass (on Echolyn, 1991)

== Discography ==
Studio albums

- Echolyn (1991)
- Suffocating the Bloom (1992)
- ...And Every Blossom (1993)
- As the World (1995)
- When the Sweet Turns Sour (1996)
- Cowboy Poems Free (2000)
- Mei (2002)
- The End Is Beautiful (2005)
- Echolyn (2012)
- I Heard You Listening (2015)
- Time Silent Radio II (2025)
- Time Silent Radio vii (2025)

Live albums

- Progfest '94 (the Official Bootleg) (2002) (released for trading among fans)
- Jersey Tomato, Volume 2 (Live at the Metlar-Bodine Museum) (2004)

Videos

- Stars and Gardens, Volume 4 DVD (2004)

Box sets

- A Little Nonsense (Now and Then) (2002)

Contributions

- Progfest '94 (Musea, 1995)
- ProgDay '95 (Proglodyte, 1996)
- To Cry You a Song: A Collection of Tull Tales (Magna Carta, 1996)
- After the Storm: A Benefit Album for the Survivors of Hurricane Katrina (NEARfest Records, 2006)
