= Cthulhu (disambiguation) =

Cthulhu is a fictional cosmic entity created by horror author H. P. Lovecraft.

Cthulhu may also refer to:

== Arts and entertainment ==
- H. P. Lovecraft's Cthulhu: The Whisperer in Darkness, a 1991-92 comics mini-series
- "Cthulhu", a song by Therion of the 1992 album Beyond Sanctorum
- Cthulhu (2000 film), an Australian horror film by Damian Heffernan
- Cthulhu (2007 film), an American horror film
- "Cthulhu", a song by The Acacia Strain from the 2008 album Continent

== Other uses ==
- Belton Regio (formerly Cthulhu Regio), the largest dark region on Pluto
- Cthulhu (genus), a symbiotic microorganism that lives in the guts of termites
- "Cuttlefish of Cthulhu", the codpiece worn by Dave Brockie, lead vocalist for the heavy metal band GWAR
- Cthulhu (developer)

== See also ==
- Call of Cthulhu (disambiguation)
- Cthulhu Live, a live-action roleplaying game
- Cthulhu 500, a card game designed by Jeff Tidball
- Cthulhu Rise, musical band from Kyiv, Ukraine
