= Utoh =

Utoh may refer to:

- Tracie Chima Utoh, Nigerian playwright
- Mat Taram bin Sa'al, Indonesian mass-murderer known as Utoh
- Eigo Utoh, member of Midas (Japanese band)
