= Neuschwanstein (band) =

German progressive rock band

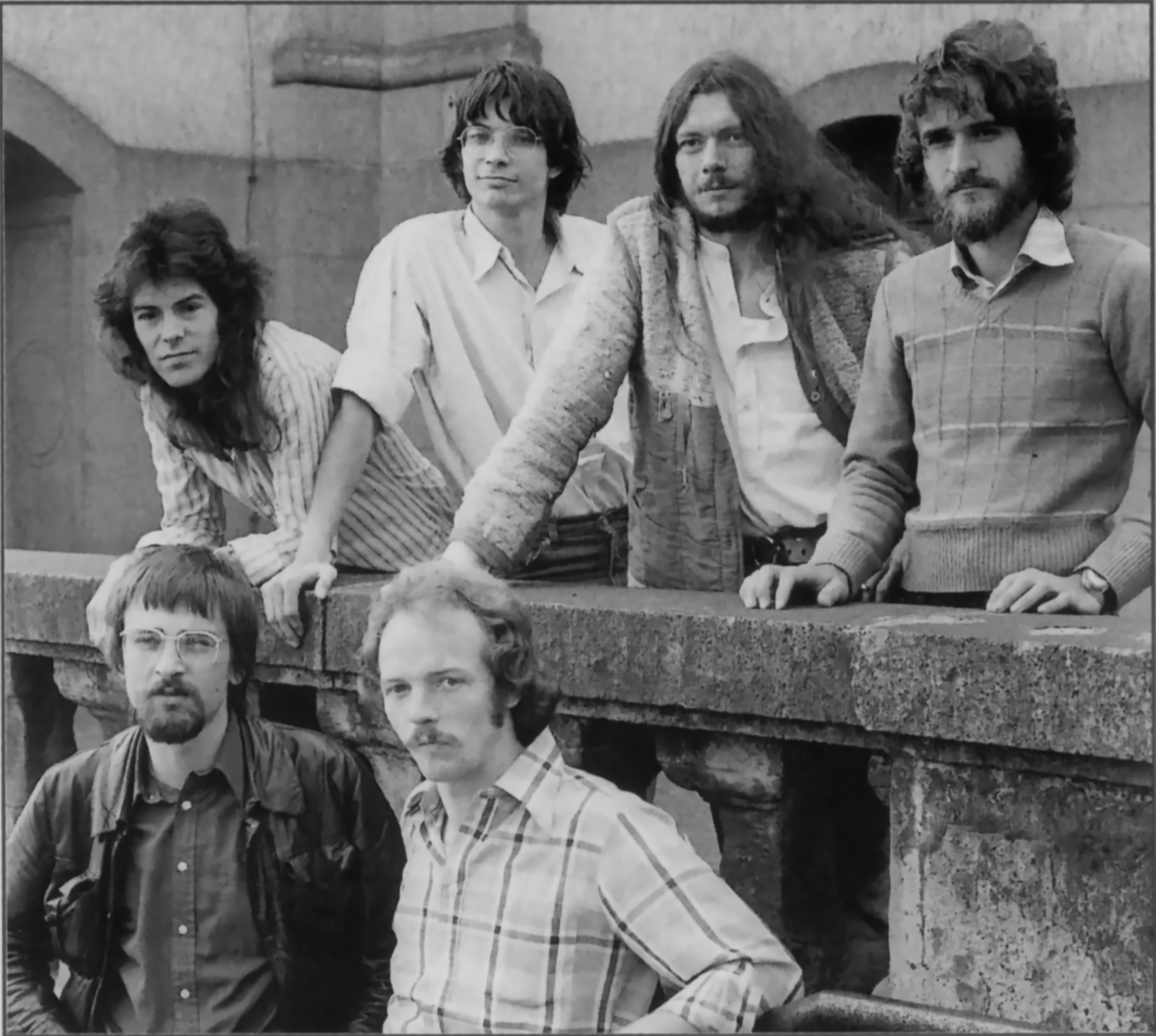
- Neuschwanstein 1978 above left to right: Rainer Zimmer, Frédéric Joos, Roger Weiler, Klaus Mayer below left to right: Thomas Neuroth, Hans Peter Schwarz

Background information
- Origin: Völklingen/Saar, Germany
- Genre: Progressive rock
- Years active: 1971–1980
- Labels: Racket Records, Musea, Cherry Red Records, LongBow Records
- Past members: Thomas Neuroth (Keyboards); Klaus Mayer (Flute); Werner Knäbel (Bass); Uli Limpert (Bass); Rainer Zimmer (Bass); Wolfgang Bode (Bass); Thomas Schmitt (Bass); Peter Fischer (Drums); Volker Klein (Drums); Thorsten Lafleur (Drums); Hans Peter Schwarz (Drums); Udo Redlich (Guitar); Roger Weiler (Guitar); Frédéric Joos (Vocals); Michael Kiessling (†) (Vocals); Rita Altmeyer (Mellotron)

Neuschwanstein is a progressive rock band which, although never signed to a major record label, was nevertheless able to release an album that was highly regarded in the prog rock scene in the 1970s.

== Band history ==
Thomas Neuroth and Kaus Mayer met during their school years in Völklingen in 1971 and quickly realised that they had common musical interests. They both had a solid background in music and appreciated the structures and lyricism of classical music combined with rock elements. Inspired by Rick Wakeman and King Crimson, the two decided, together with some other school friends, to form a band, which they named Neuschwanstein.

"The name should be German and sound romantic. I also don't want to rule out that I wanted the 'Neu' from my name in it."

— Thomas Neuroth, Saarbrücker Zeitung, 2018

This band name was no coincidence, as this castle, built by King Ludwig II of Bavaria, represents the romantic era in its most impressive form.

At first, they made do with cover versions from the standard Anglo-Saxon rock genre, especially Rick Wakeman songs. Very impressed by his Journey to the Centre of the Earth, Neuschwanstein decided to compose a long piece of instrumental music as well and worked on the musical adaptation of the famous Lewis Carroll novel Alice in Wonderland.

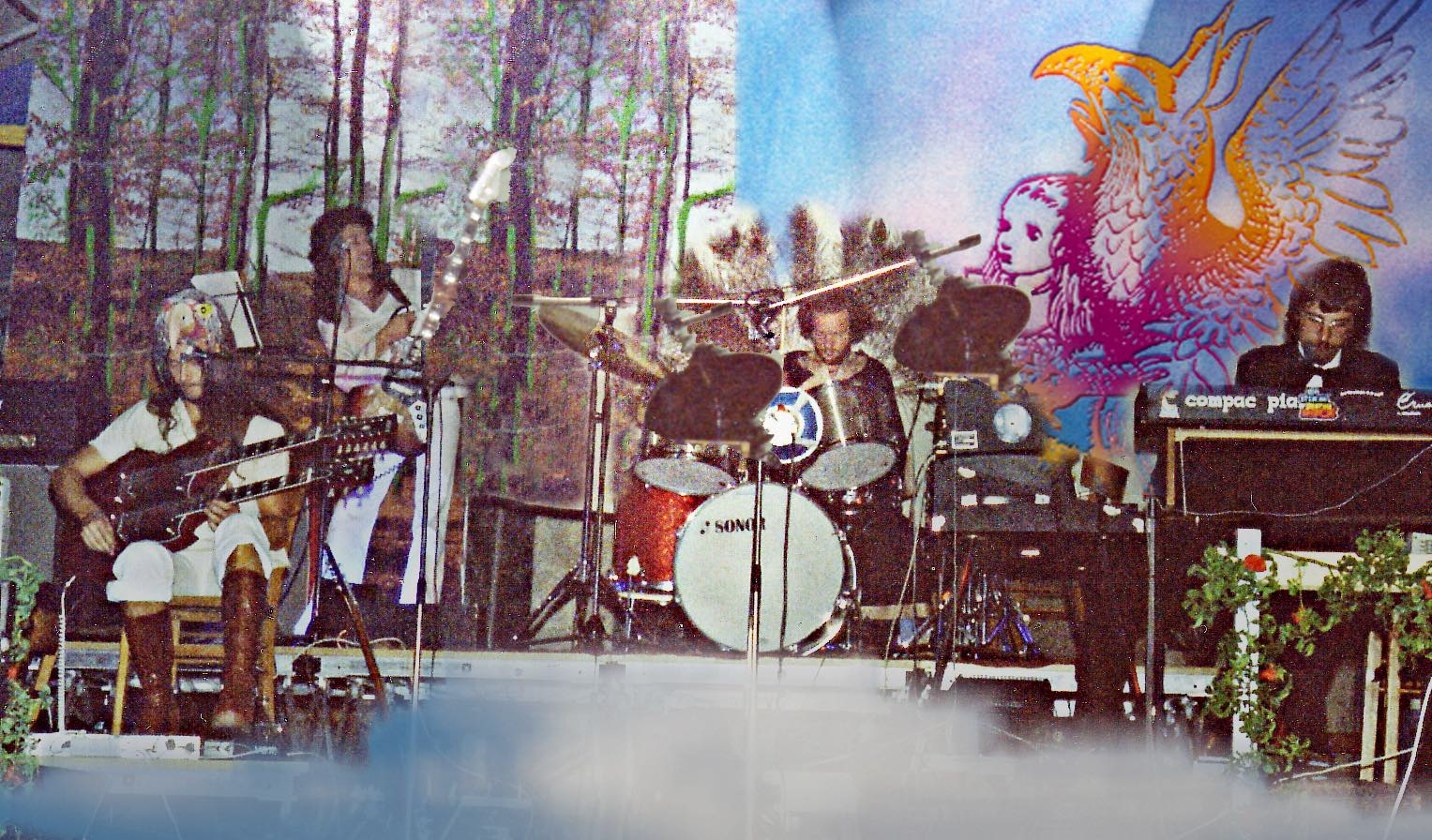
Neuschwanstein live playing "Alice in Wonderland", 1977

The premiere of this 40-minute piece of music took place in 1974 at a local secondary school. In 1975, Neuschwanstein used it to win a band competition at the Saarland State Theatre in Saarbrücken.

"We want to make music that is in contrast to the usual music styles, such as rock, jazz or the like. Of course, we let ourselves be influenced, but no more or less than any other musician who listens to a lot of music himself. With Neuschwanstein, there is no emphasis on improvisation. We see ourselves less as creative performers and more as creative constructors. Improvisations are mostly emotionally conditioned and do not always guarantee an optimum. Without copying Genesis or Wakeman, we want to present the audience with more than just a song, but a pleasure for the ear and the eye."

— Thomas Neuroth, Saarland music magazine GUCKLOCH, 12/76

The new guitarist Roger Weiler, who had joined the band earlier, significantly shaped Neuschwanstein's sound with his playing. In April 1976, Neuschwanstein booked a small recording studio in Saarbrücken-Güdingen to record Alice in Wonderland on tape. The original master tapes are lost, but a cassette copy existed, which 32 years later, in 2008, was released on CD for the first time in restored form by the French record company Musea.

In 2022, Cherry Red Records released a reissue of the album. The recordings have been extensively restored and the original German lyrics have been replaced by English ones. The new lyrics are spoken by Sonja Kristina, lead singer of Curved Air.

The label itself describes the album as "The only album in the 'Narrated Rock' genre to be unavailable in English until now."

In 1976, there was another new addition, in the form of French singer Frédéric Joos, whose vocals were strongly reminiscent of Peter Gabriel, but also had similarities with The Strawbs' singer Dave Cousins.

Neuschwanstein "Battlement" cast: left to right: Thomas Neuroth, Frédéric Joos, Rainer Zimmer, Roger Weiler, Klaus Mayer

Between 1974 and 1978, Neuschwanstein was still only a locally known group, occasionally hired as an opening act for bands like Novalis and Lucifer's Friend.

This was to change abruptly in 1978. Due to a friendship of their manager and Herman Rarebell, the drummer of the Scorpions, the band was able to book a studio in Cologne to record an album under the direction of Dieter Dierks, producer of the Scorpions. This album, Battlement, was first released by a small local label called Racket Records. In 1992 Musea re-released the album in a new mix by guitarist Roger Weiler, including a bonus track which was not available before. For Musea it became one of the most successful productions of this French label and sold worldwide.

Battlement, however, was to remain Neuschwanstein's only production with this line-up. Due to professional changes and other interests, as well as general feelings of discouragement, the group disbanded just one year later, in 1980.

Le manque de succès, l'avènement de la new wave et le mépris général pour le progressif décourageront la plupart des membres du groupe, qui finira par éclater en 1980, mais il reste cet album tout à fait digne de respect pour témoigner de ce qui aurait pu être… Et c'en est frustrant.

Lack of success, the rise of New Wave and general disdain for progressives discouraged most members of the band, which eventually broke up in 1980, but this thoroughly respectable album remains as a testament to what might have been.... And that's frustrating.

— Marc Moingeon, Neuschwanstein : Battlement (1979 - cd - parue dans le Koid9 no. 62)

In 2016, after a break of 37 years, a new album by Neuschwanstein, Fine Art, was released. Basically, Fine Art is a "one-man project" by the only original member of Neuschwanstein, Thomas Neuroth. With the help of numerous musician friends, Neuroth created a remarkable album that hardly sounds like Neuschwanstein's original music - despite intensive use of flute - nor like their earlier role models such as Genesis, but much more like the combination of Emerson, Lake and Palmer, classical, romantic and progressive hard-rocking complexity that occurs in the form of a suite.

Members of Neuschwanstein photographed during the early "Alice in Wonderland" era
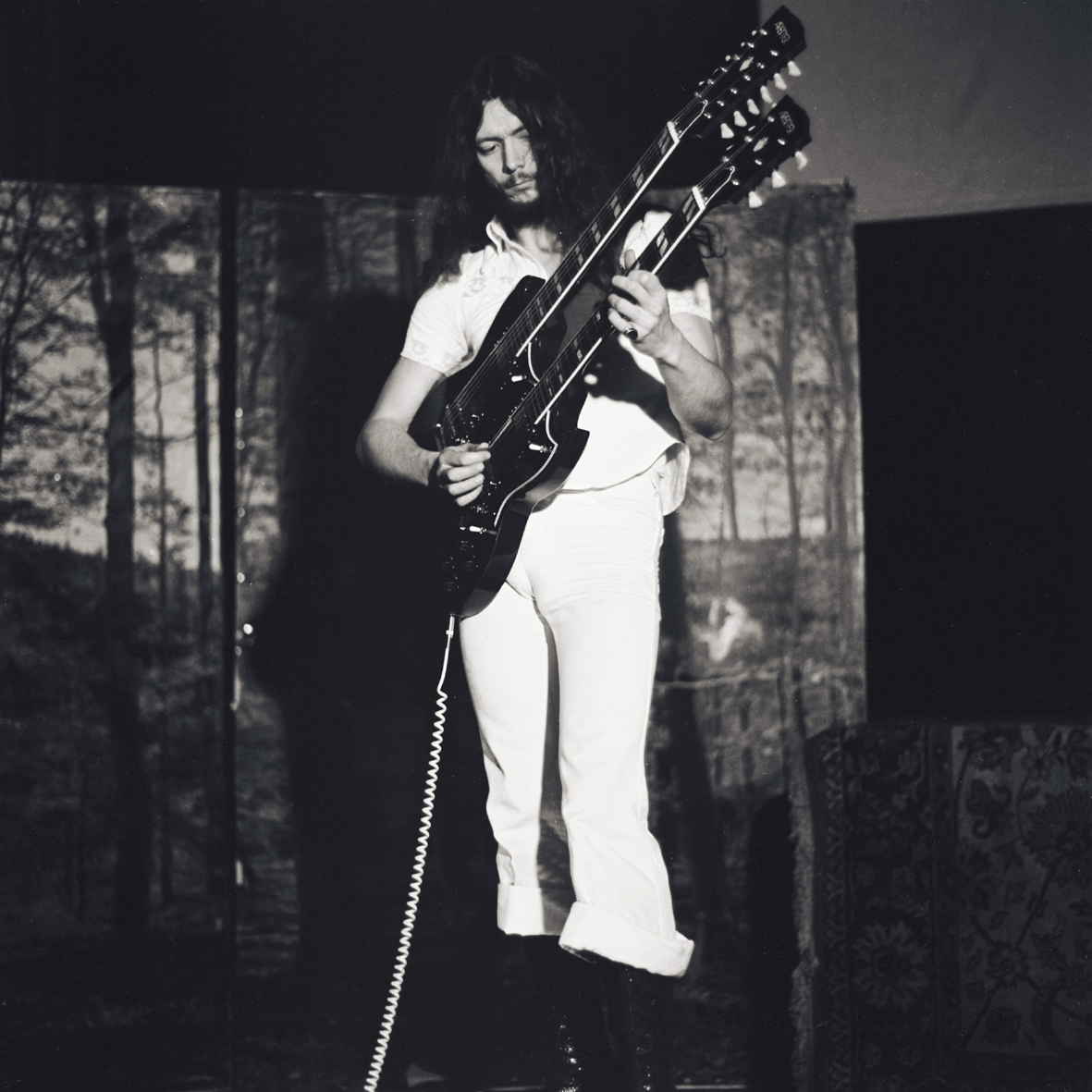
Roger Weiler playing double-necked guitar

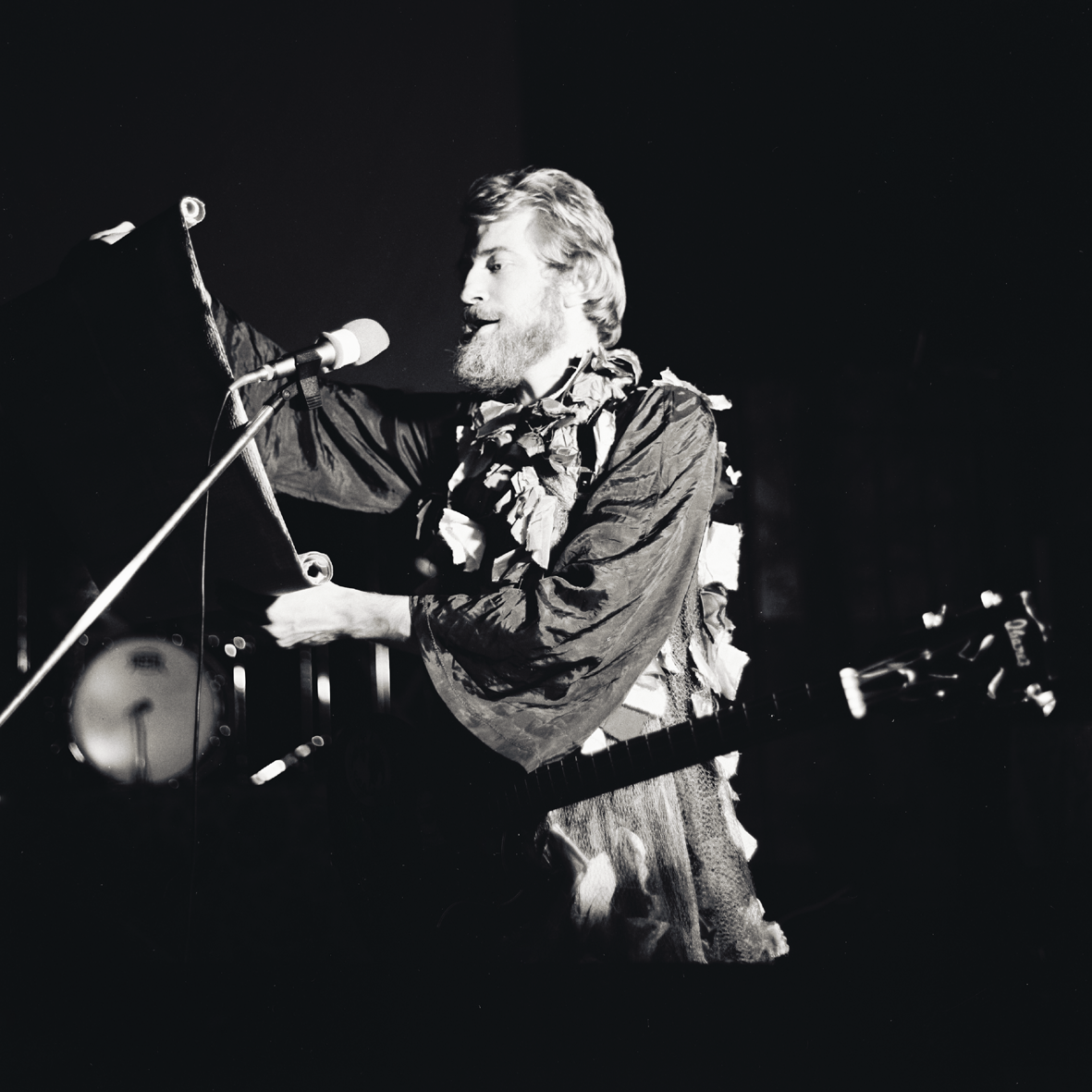
Uli Limpert (bass) reciting text passages from Alice in Wonderland

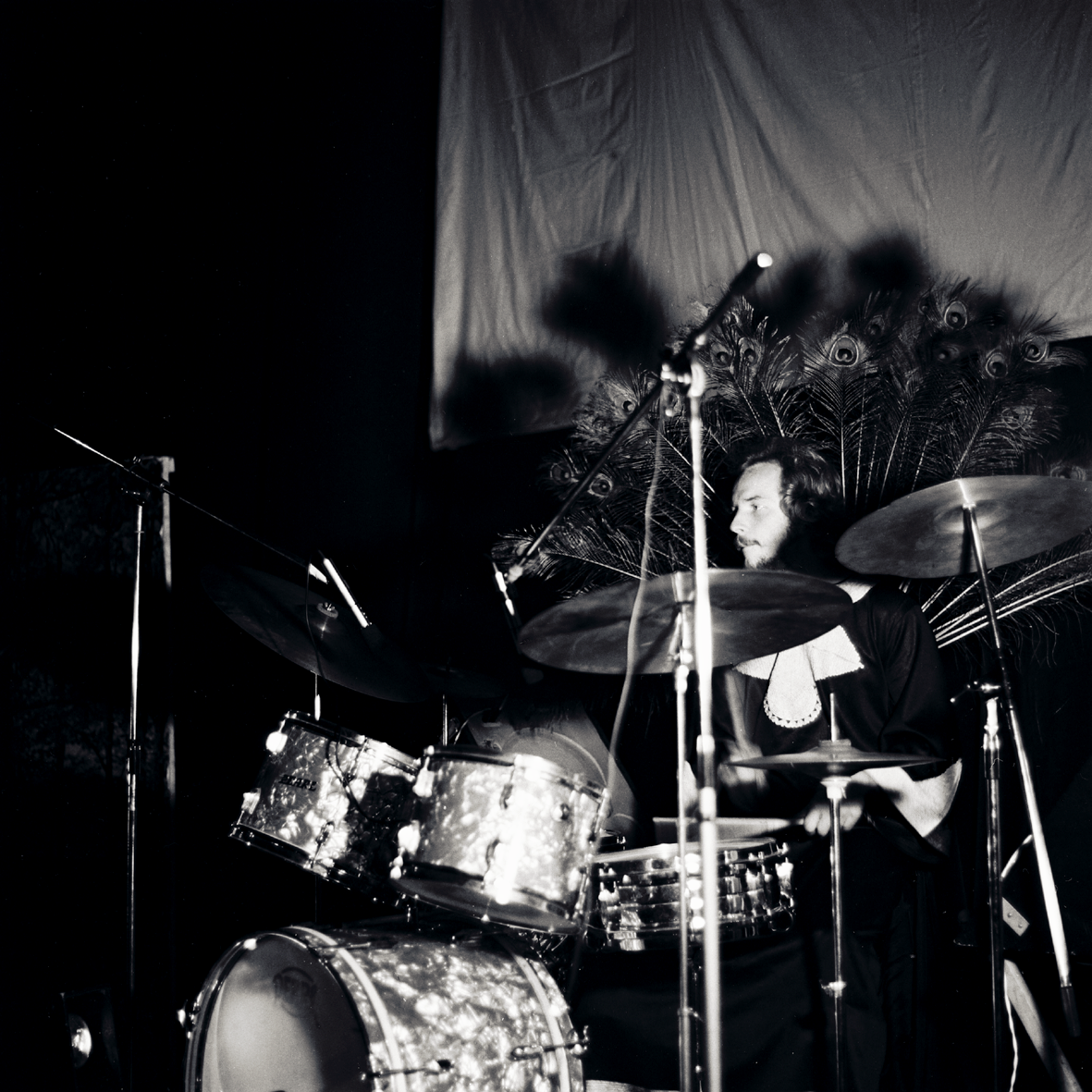
Hans Peter Schwarz playing drums

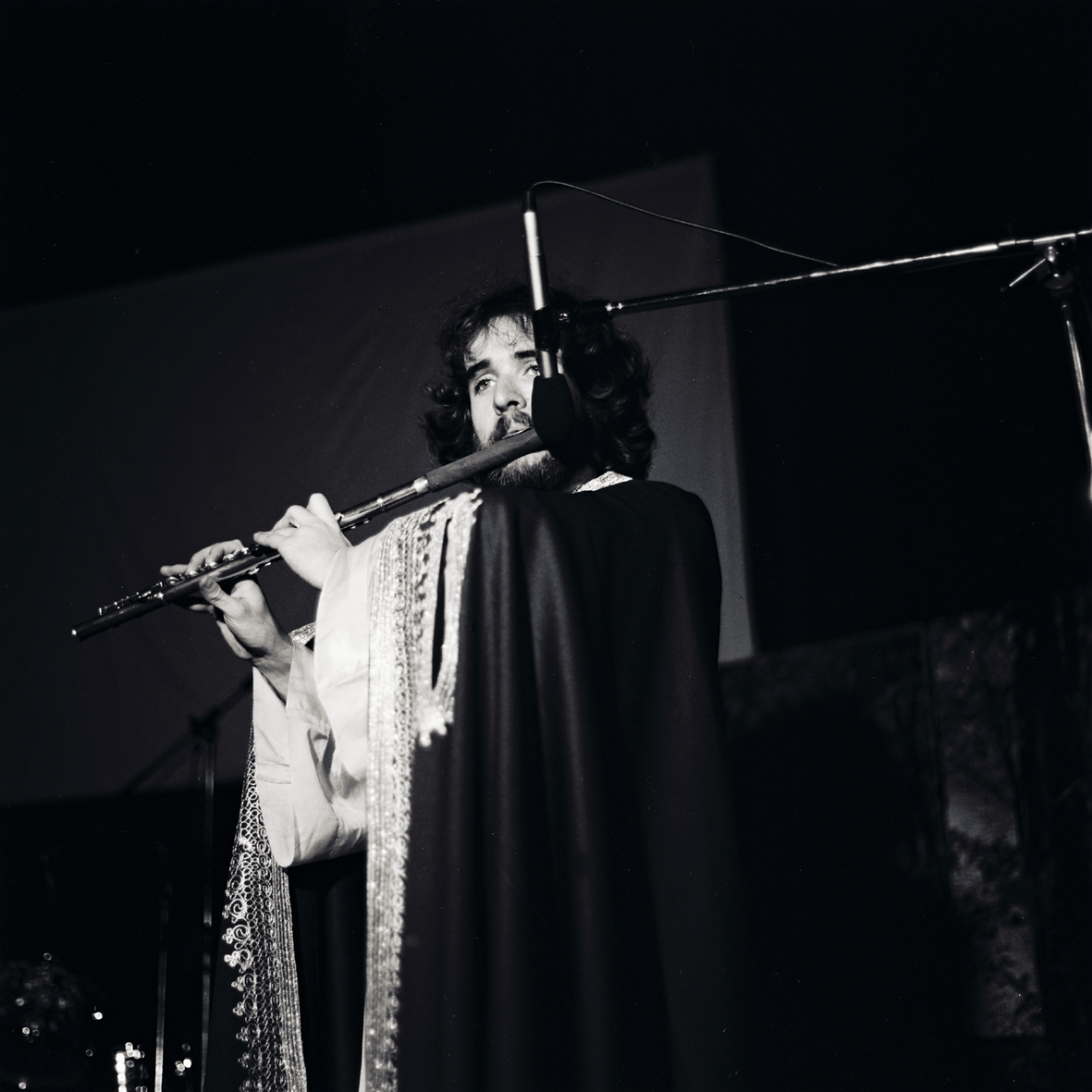
Klaus Mayer playing flute

== Discography ==
- 1979: Battlement (re-released as remix CD by Musea, 1992)
- 2008: Alice in Wonderland (CD release from tape recordings 1976 by Musea)
- 2016: Fine Art
- 2022: Alice in Wonderland feat. Sonja Kristina (re-released by Cherry Red Records)
