= Battlement (album) =

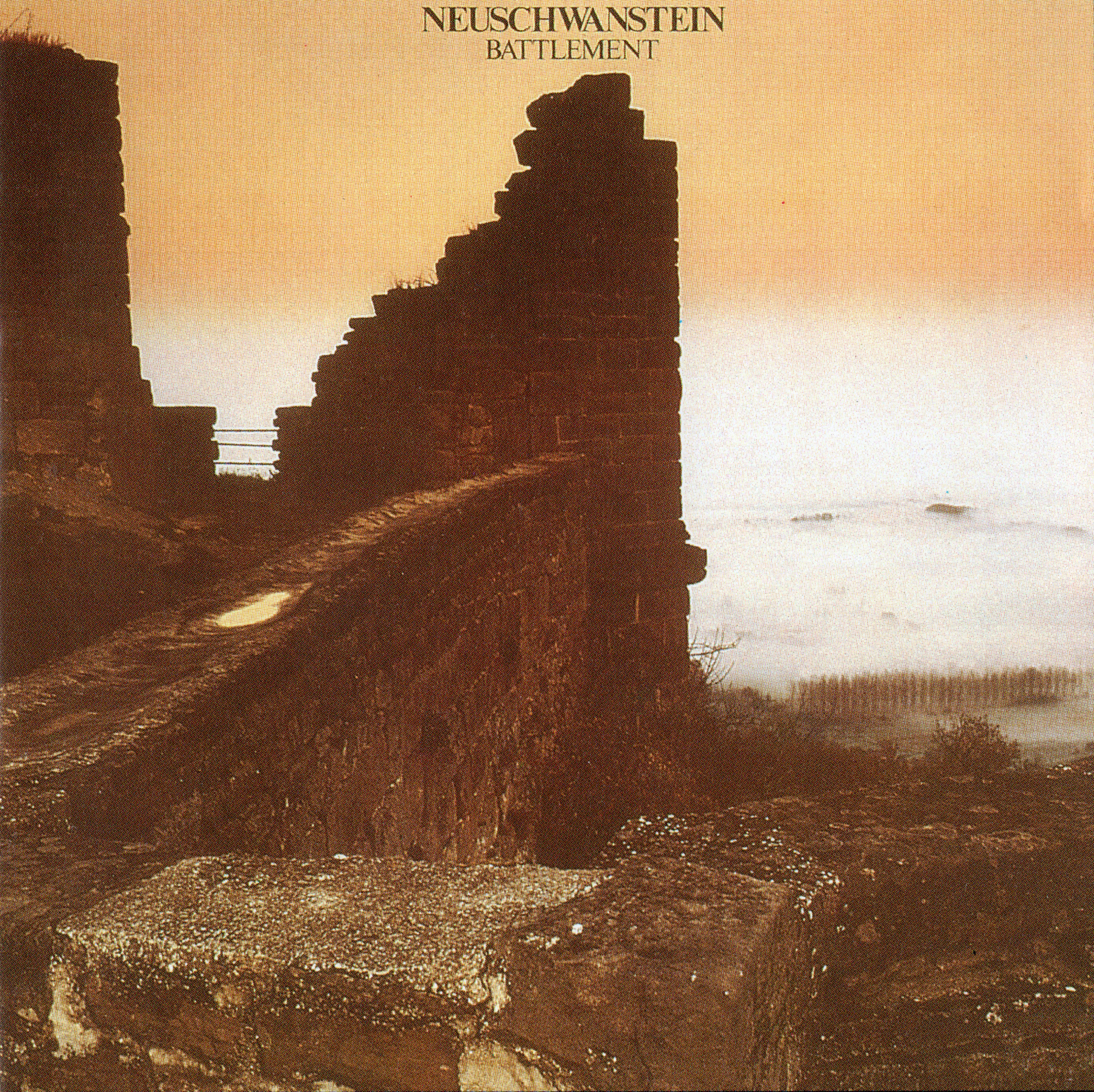

Studio album by Neuschwanstein
- Released: 1979
- Recorded: 21–31 October 1978
- Studios: Studio Diercks, Cologne (Germany)
- Genre: Progressive Rock
- Length: 46:47
- Label: Racket Records
- Producer: Ulli Reichert

Neuschwanstein chronology
Battlement (1979)	Alice in Wonderland (2008)

Battlement is the only official studio album by the German progressive rock band Neuschwanstein. It is still considered one of the most remarkable German productions of this genre of the late 1970s. The album's importance to the progressive rock scene is also evident from the fact that there are hundreds of articles, reviews and blogs on Battlement worldwide, from North and South America, throughout Western and Eastern Europe, to Central and East Asia.

== History ==
In the early 1970s, Thomas Neuroth and Klaus Mayer formed the band Neuschwanstein. Enthused by King Crimson and Rick Wakeman, they initially performed as a cover band, with a repertoire also including classical and baroque adaptations. After several line-up changes, a stable line-up crystallised in early 1974, consisting of Thomas Neuroth (keyboards), Klaus Mayer (flute), Udo Redlich (electric guitar), Uli Limpert (electric bass) and Hans Peter Schwarz (drums).

Wakeman's Journey to the Centre of the Earth was released in May 1974. This album became the initial spark for Neuschwanstein to present a similar work on stage, Alice in Wonderland. Neuschwanstein performed successfully several times with their stage show in the entire German-French border region (Saarland/Lorraine/Alsace), often in front of several thousand spectators, and thus got to play in the support of already well-known bands such as Novalis and Lucifer's Friend.

The year 1975 was to lead to another step towards professionalism. Redlich was replaced by guitarist Roger Weiler after voluntarily leaving the band and Ulli Reichert, a Saarland businessman with contacts in the music scene (Herman Rarebell, Scorpions), began to support the group not only financially.

Besides the numerous gigs with Alice in Wonderland, the group worked out new material, influenced by Genesis of the Peter Gabriel as well as by Steve Hackett. In 1976, the singer and musician Frédéric Joos, who came from near Metz (France), who had already worked with Weiler years before, was signed on to sing with Neuschwanstein, as his voice fitted the style of the band's new compositions perfectly.

Due to his connections, manager Reichert managed to get the group the chance to record their new programme in October 1978 at the Dieter Dierks Studios in Cologne-Stommelen. In just 10 days, from 21 to 31 October, the group recorded several of their favourite pieces, 6 of which eventually appeared on the album. "A Winter's Tale", (Note: In February 2025, Roger Weiler (together with Stefan Zintel) released the album Moon & Maze, on which this song is included for the first time in a slightly modified form as "Winter Tale". The album was released under the band name "Lighthouse Poets".(https://lighthousepoets.bandcamp.com/album/moon-maze)) composed by Joos and lyricised by Weiler, and the rather commercial song "Midsummer Day" were omitted for the final production. The band intended to release the latter on a promotional single, but financial reasons prevented them from doing so. It was only through the 1992 CD release of Musea Records that this song appeared as a bonus track.

Joos took over all the vocal parts, except for the title song "Battlement", which was written and sung by Rainer Zimmer. To give the album a professional touch and perhaps achieve greater commercial success, manager Reichert asked Scorpions drummer Herman Rarebell to re-record the drum tracks on the opener "Loafer Jack" and thus also appear in the album credits. Reichert and Rarebell, whose real name is Hermann Erbel, had known each other for some time in the Saarland music scene, where Rarebell had already made a name for himself before his involvement with the Scorpions. However, the group was not at all enthusiastic about this decision, especially since Hans Peter Schwarz had already recorded a much more subtle rhythm pattern for this track whereas Rarebell had recorded a classic rock drum kit.

The album Battlement was initially released as an LP in 1979 and sold 6000 copies in a short time. For a self-production of a band without a record deal, this is a considerable success, especially because during this time interest in progressive rock was waning considerably, with new wave and post-punk already on the rise. Despite Neuschwanstein's considerable popularity, the success of the album failed to materialise, even despite a good distribution deal with a small local label called Racket Records (not to be confused with the Marillion-owned label of the same name). Weiler later said about this:

We were exactly in the ungrateful middle with the timing: Four years earlier (1974) or four years later (1982) – and we would have been in the running! I was and still am firmly convinced of that!

A reviewer from the Netherlands writes:

It's funny that Marillion were just starting out [at the time of this release, author's note] and are considered neoprog along with a few other bands, but Neuschwanstein, who were never considered neoprog, could actually be considered neoprog pioneers. In that sense, this record sounds like a kind of pre-Script for a Jester's Tear.

== CD vs. LP ==
In 1992, Roger Weiler contacted the people in charge at Musea Records and suggested that they reissue the album on CD. Musea Records, based in Metz (France), is a small label that has excelled in the distribution of progressive rock productions. The idea was put into action together with former Neuschwanstein manager Reichert, and so Reichert and Weiler remixed the original recordings for this occasion in March 1992 at Sound Factory Studios, Saarbrücken. For Musea, this re-release should pay off, as the CD would prove to be an absolute highlight and one of the most successful productions of this label.

Weiler stated in February 2022:

I was only interested in a contemporary preservation of the music and a CD was the measure of all things at that time. [...] It was important to me because I was not at all satisfied with the original mix. I wanted a more transparent sound with more dynamics. In the original mix, the bass was far too dominant for me, even though it was very well played. I thought a sound similar to Genesis would be more suitable.

The new mix, however, turned out to be extremely complicated. He also elaborated:

We experimented a lot with the remix to make it more direct and transparent – it didn't work! As soon as you left out a melody of an instrument, it was no longer the song – that actually showed the whole depth of the music as we had composed and arranged it. So in the end, all that was left in the remix was the reduction of the dominant bass playing.

This remix was not always met with undivided opinion in the progressive rock scene. The reviewer "comp of nss" wrote on Prograrchives.com:

(The) CD is not the original music, the musicians recorded on tape. The CD is a remix. Remixed by a nice producer and a Genesis fan. Without the intention, the charme and this unmistakable sound of the seventies. So, if you can, hear the vinyl. Only on vinyl "Battlement" is truthful.

Peter Thelen from Exposé online comments:

The original mix was just a little on the bassy side, so with good intentions, Musea brought the band's guitar player in to remix the album. Unfortunately, most of the bass has now been mixed out, and the vocals have been brought further to the forefront, giving the album a whole new character sounding more like Genesis […] but I must admit I'm somewhat disappointed with the remix.

Comparing the two versions, it is indeed noticeable that the bass is no longer so dominant and the treble has been raised. In addition, the sound has gained more stereo width and more reverb has been added to keyboards, flute and vocals.

== Cover ==
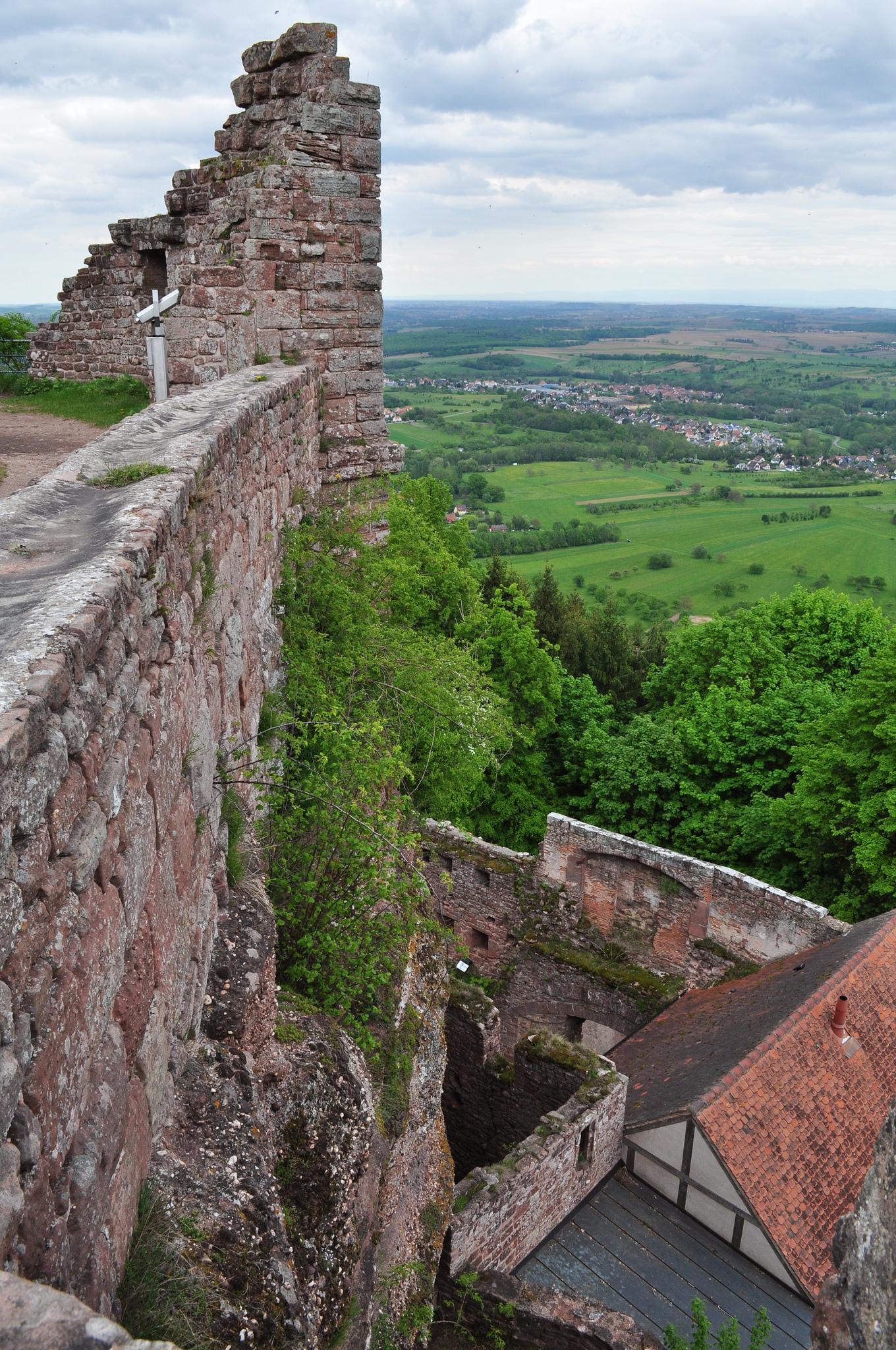
Partial view of the ruined castle of Haut-Barr in Alsace (similar angle as on the cover)

Responsible for the photos of the LP cover is Werner Richner, who, like Neuschwanstein, is also from Völklingen. He was also active as a rock musician until the mid-1970s. Richner is a nationally known and successful photographer and publisher of illustrated books and has, among other things, photographed numerous castles for various illustrated books.

For the front cover of the album, Richner photographed the castle of Haut-Barr (German "Hohbarr") near Saverne (Alsace/France); the photo for the back cover of the album was taken in Greece, according to his own statements. The idea for the front cover of Battlement is based on the title song of the same name.

== Critical reception (Excerpts) ==
Weuschka from Ukraine writes:

A true masterpiece of 1970s progressive epic-sympho rock. A German band that incorporates the best of Genesis, Camel and Eloy.

Domenico D'Alessandro from Italy comments:

This band has never known an international recognition and still is a hidden gem from German Golden Era of Prog.

== Track listing ==
All tracks are written by Neuschwanstein and Ulli Reichert (except track 5, composed and performed by Rainer Zimmer).

No.	Title	Length
1.	"Loafer Jack"	4:42
2.	"Ice With Dwale"	6:21
3.	"Intruders and the Punishment"	7:34
4.	"Beyond The Bugle"	7:31
5.	"Battlement"	7:05
6.	"Midsummer Day"	7:42
7.	"Zärtlicher Abschied"	5:52
Total length:		46:47

The album was released both on LP and CD. "Midsummer Day" is only available as a bonus track on CD.

== Personnel ==
- Thomas Neuroth – keyboards
- Klaus Mayer – flute
- Roger Weiler – electric guitar
- Rainer Zimmer – bass
- Hans Peter Schwarz – drums
- Frédéric Joos – vocals

== Sources ==
- Helm, Roland; Küntzer, Norbert (2011). Saar Rock History – Volume 1 & 2. Saarbrücken: H. Raueiser GmbH. ISBN 978-3-87661-037-5.
- Grosse, Francis (1992). Battlement (booklet). Neuschwanstein. Metz: Musea.
- Weiler, Roger (2008). Alice in Wonderland (booklet). Neuschwanstein. Metz: Musea.
