= Fine Art (Neuschwanstein album) =

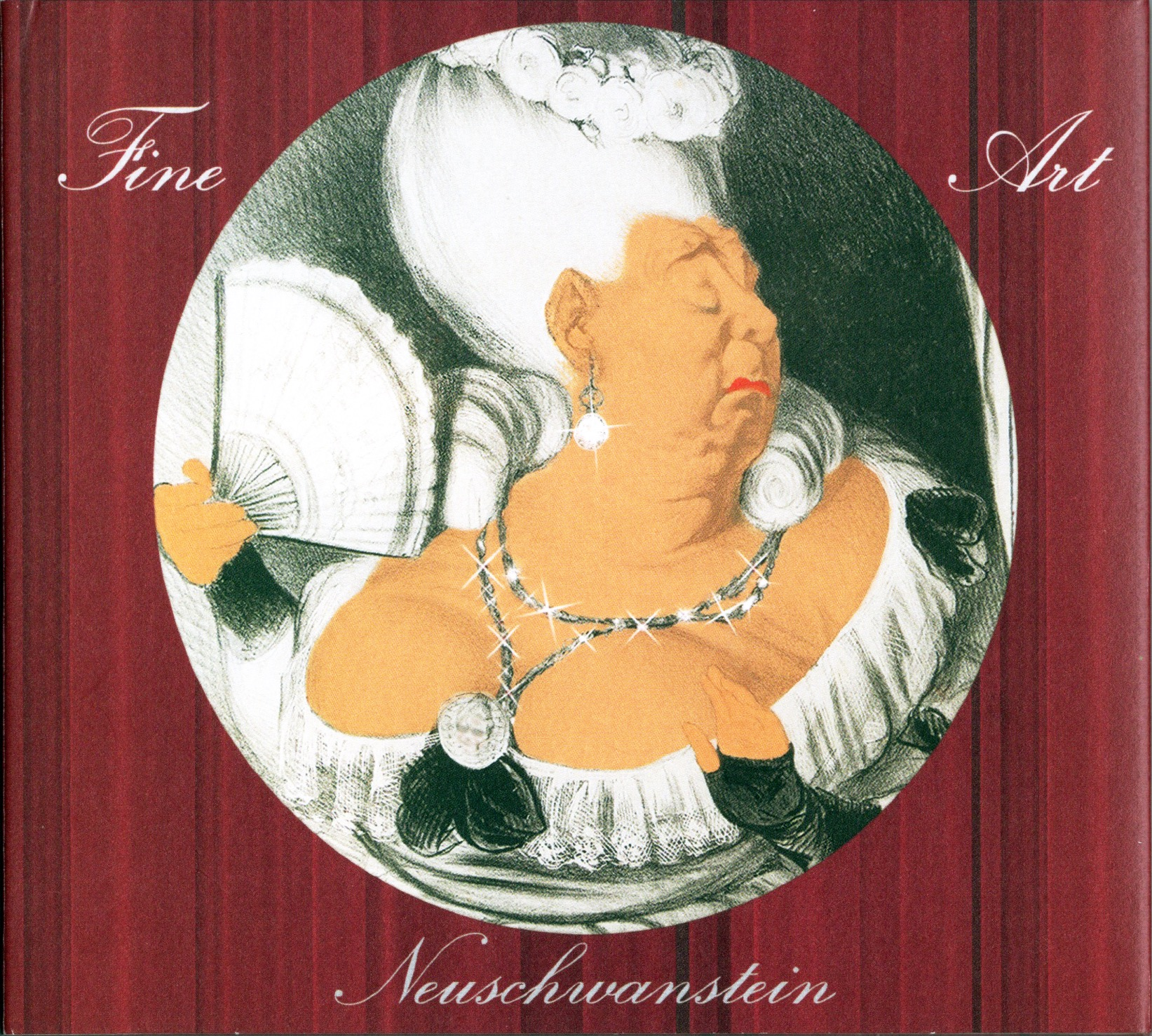

Studio album by Neuschwanstein
- Released: 1 July 2016
- Recorded: ca. 2007–2016
- Studios: Principal Studios, Senden (Germany)
- Genre: Symphonic rock
- Length: 41:56
- Label: LongBow (DE)
- Producer: Thomas Neuroth

Neuschwanstein chronology
Alice in Wonderland (2008)	Fine Art (2016)

Fine Art is the third album released by the band Neuschwanstein in 2016.

== History ==
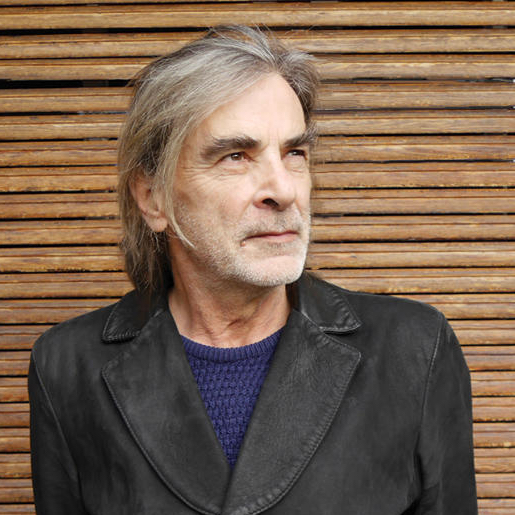
Thomas Neuroth, 2016

In 2005, Thomas Neuroth received a call from his former Neuschwanstein co-musician Klaus Mayer (flutes), informing him of the tragic passing of their erstwhile manager, Ulli Reichert. As a result of this and many following conversations, the idea was born to reunite after all these years and make music again as a band; the chapter ″Neuschwanstein″ was somehow not over, after all.

″There was lots of noise. [...], I had to get it out. Not having composed anything in a long time, there were tons of ideas in my head, noted on slips of paper; dozens of drafts and studies lying on and around the piano. It needed to be done.″

— Thomas Neuroth, Empire Music Magazine, Nr. 119, p. 18-19, 2017

Around 2007, Neuroth began sorting his diverse compositions and drafts from the past years and putting them on paper. About which he says in December 2021:

It took me a good year to figure out a concept for the new album, a line-up, style and sound. A process of growth with many yays and nays, continuously evolving, expanding, entirely discarded only to be picked up from scratch again.

At first and for a long while, music was made in Neuroth's home studio and via the internet, which, at the time, did not come without some technical complications. Despite the troubles of long-distance collaboration, the recordings were finally as good as finished, yet not fully completed due to the two musicians parting ways again for various reasons.

However, Neuroth could not get the idea for this new Neuschwanstein album out of his head, prompting him to start anew, this time not via the internet but mostly on site with guest musicians. Recording in Neuroth's neat little home studio took two years; another two years were spent mixing the audio for this opulent, synthesizer-free soundscape with flutes, strings and a thunderous rock instrumentation. For one more year, he worked on the cover design. In total, it took eight years to get from the initial idea to the eventual release.

The selection of musicians is by no means random. When Neuschwanstein broke up in 1980, he kept playing with Michael Kiessling (d. 2019) in the Michael Kiessling Band. Their drummer was Rainer Kind, who played and functioned as musical director for Matthias Reim, among others. This group recorded a CD in 1989, Kiessling Band, for which Robby Musenbichler, a famous Austrian session guitarist, provided the guitar parts. Both Kind and Musenbichler agreed to contribute to the production of Fine Art. Neuroth's son Valentin complemented Musenbichler's guitar as a second guitarist.

For financial reasons, Neuschwanstein's new compositions could not be recorded with an actual orchestra, so Thomas Neuroth largely made use of an orchestra library. To minimize any artificial sound, he engaged Sabine Fröhlich, violinist from Münster, who would record both violin and viola tracks multiple times, using the overdubbing (layering) technique. She “almost died”, jokes Neuroth, when he revealed his plans for an especially rich sound: she was to play the first violin fourteen times, twelve times the second one, ten times the viola part - and not to forget about the solo violin.

Originally, publishing was supposed to be achieved with support from the French Musea Records label which had already released the two previous Neuschwanstein albums and was principally interested in Fine Art. However, an agreement could not be reached over insurmountable differences regarding conditions. For this reason, Neuroth decided to found his own label, LongBow Records.

== Music ==
Neo-Romantic symphonic orchestral sounds meet rock band. United and opposed in harmony and confrontation. Intermeshed in fugal complexity and utterly, spaciously free. Emotional and authentic. Instrumental, like the early years. Music that tells stories. Programme music.

This is how the composer describes his own music and with this it becomes clear that this indeed cannot be a pure successor in the style of Battlement. It is an album full of contrasts. Progressive rock can be heard at times, sometimes even some heavy or hard rock in the best Deep Purple manner, then back to neo-romantic symphonic orchestra. The combination of rock band and orchestra dominates, whereby the two act not as antagonists, instead the band functions as a firmly integrated part of the orchestra.

"I wanted to do something that no one is doing or has done like this before. Orchestra and rock band. To see that once as a whole. An orchestra with additional instruments, a greatly expanded band. Not just have one be the accompaniment to the other. ′Electric guitar into the orchestra! Add the Hammond!′ That's what you should chant loud and all the time."

— Thomas Neuroth, Empire Music Magazine, Nr. 119, p. 18-19, 2017

Similarly, Jon Lord already composed in this style with his Concerto for Group and Orchestra. Unlike Jon Lord's Concerto, where the rock instruments are treated as solo instruments for long stretches, in Fine Art they are integral parts of the whole sound structure. Even when, for example, Musenbichler's electric guitar acts as a soloist, it does not impose itself on the listener, but is surprisingly restrained in terms of volume, so that all instruments can be heard on an equal footing next to and with each other.

So it is not surprising that the album has become 99% instrumental. Of the 10 tracks (9 on the LP), three are adaptations of classical compositions, namely by Claude Debussy, Camille Saint-Saëns and J. A. P. Schulz.

Fêtes
(French for "celebrations") is based on the second part of Claude Debussy's Trois Nocturnes (1899). Fêtes is introduced by a harpsichord, recorder and ring of bells in Late-medieval or early Renaissance style (if the harpsichord were a lute or lap harp, then this introduction could be assigned to medieval minstrels).

This is followed by the roughly ten-minute adaptation of Debussy's composition, which takes over from the minstrels with a thunderous rock ensemble, dominated by electric guitar and Leslie Hammond organ, always in exchange with the other orchestral instruments. Frequent rhythm changes make it clear that this adaptation is heading toward progressive rock. About halfway through, the turbulent chase of the main theme through the various instruments ends in a furious semifinal. After a brief interruption, the piece continues with an ostinato motif (underlaid with surrealistic soundscapes), which gradually increases in dynamics and pitch in a bolero-like manner. Hammond organ and electric guitar also dominate this second section of the adaptation. Towards the end, the main theme takes over again, alternating between rock and orchestral instruments.

Regarding the striking similarities between Claude Debussy's ostinato motif, on which the Trois Nocturnes are based, and Maurice Ravel's Boléro, all that can be said is that Ravel's composition appeared 28 years later.

Per omnem vitam
(Latin for ″Through all of life″) is one of the most personal and energy-sapping titles on this album, as Thomas Neuroth himself states. The work on it took more than half a year. A reviewer unknown by name writes in his blog about it:

As a classical composition alone I think that piece is just brilliant.... should be played in symphony halls all over the world... I love how it changes halfway through and proceeds to become very symphonically dramatic or OST by the end. How can humans write music so brilliant?

The piece consists of two sections, a pure orchestral arrangement dominated by a melancholic flute melody and a rocking part, with driving drums and guitar solo, which towards the end returns thematically and tonally to the calm beginning.

God's little plan
This short interlude is, according to Thomas Neuroth, ″a study for the title The Distributor for two pianos″, which he recorded together with Karl Szelnik. Indeed, certain similarities in motifs can be recognized at the beginning of each of the two compositions. On closer listening, ELP-typical harmonic chord pushes towards the end of the piece cannot be dismissed.

Florence Coleman Pt. 1 & 2
During a stay in Paris, Thomas Neuroth found an English-language daily newspaper from Boston (USA) from 1910 in a second-hand bookstore, in which a tragic accident of a child of the prominent Coleman family was reported. It said that shortly before her 12th birthday, their daughter Florence was hit by a horse-drawn vehicle while playing in the street and died as a result of her severe injuries.

This event inspired Neuroth to write Florence Coleman, which he divided into two parts to express the different moods: From the anticipation of the birthday, to the accident, to the grief over the loss of the child. Accordingly, Part 1 and Part 2 stand in stark contrast to each other: while Part 1 is dominated by loud electric guitars, flute and a driving drum kit, Part 2 is a pure orchestral part with a soulful piano theme in the middle.

The Angels Of Sodom

Then the LORD rained brimstone and fire on Sodom and Gomorrah from the LORD out of heaven, and He overthrew those cities, and all the surrounding area, and all the inhabitants of the cities, and what grew on the ground.

— Book of Genesis, chapter 19, verse 24-25.

Thomas Neuroth could not help but think of this biblical verse when he got hold of an issue of the satirical magazine Le Charivari from July 1842 in a Paris antiquarian bookshop, in which a lithograph by the artist Pierre Joseph Challamel, Les Anges de Sôdome, was printed.

Inspired by this biblical story, his composition came into being in which he wanted to express the divine violence that got cast upon these sinful cities through correspondingly powerful music. A rising roll of thunder from the orchestra leads into a doubled guitar theme, carried by a thundering rhythm section and a full orchestra playing in unison to the theme. From the second third of the piece, the rhythm changes and the tempo increases even more, symbolising the flight of Lot and his family.

Die Geschichte vom kleinen Hähnchen (German for ″The fable of the little chicken″)
is probably the most curious piece on this album, a ″comedic intermezzo″. It begins first with a very idiosyncratic, extremely guttural spoken text about the unrequited love of a little chicken, with the entire story formed from just a single sentence. After the recital, the piece concludes with a dialogue between the flute and piano in a dancing 3/4 time. The harmony of the piece moves between romanticism and impressionism.

Along with initial recordings of Der Mond ist aufgegangen, Neuroth tackled this track in 2008 before any of the other compositions on this album, though the original version did not yet involve the flute. After the flute part was composed, Neuroth came up with the idea for the lyrics:

While listening, a little chicken immediately appeared in my mind's eye, which I then drew immediately. From that point on, the drawing was the source of inspiration for the text.

The drawing is on the inside of the digipack. Originally, this story of the little chicken was to be read by Harry Rowohlt, whom Neuroth greatly admired - not only because of his linguistic imprint - and was therefore already in contact with. Unfortunately, Rowohlt died during the time of the correspondence, so Neuroth had to take the reading into his own hands. For better understanding for non-German speaking readers, there is an English translation on the Longbow Records website.

The Distributor
The title is based on a visit Neuroth made to Amsterdam in 2015 to see, among other things, Alexander Taratynov's bronze sculpture of Rembrandt's The Night Watch. This sculpture, placed directly in front of the Rembrandt monument on Rembrandtplein, was a real crowd puller between 2012 and 2020. Although the Ebola virus had also reached Europe at that time, Neuroth could observe visitors repeatedly touching the open and outstretched hand of one of the figures. Neuroth was struck by the concept of the ″distributor″ who would spread the virus unhindered among millions of people, inevitably bringing about the apocalypse. According to Neuroth, he also tried to express this symbolism in one of his own depictions on the album, with an open hand above a theatre hall depopulated by the virus to match the title:

When I was in Amsterdam in the summer of 2015 and saw all those sweaty hands touching the shiny gold hand of the Nachtwache's 'frontman', about one every second, the title 'Distributor' came to mind. Instead, the term 'Spreader' might have been better suited. But I wasn't aware of it at the time.

The title begins with a distinctive effect, realised on a sub-bass flute by Gudula Rosa, followed by a cheerful, upbeat orchestral section with solo flute in the style of modernism. This section is abruptly replaced by a Hard rock part, finally turning into a shuffle, which is sometimes deliberately dissonant. Thomas Neuroth describes the structure as follows:

Gudula Rosa's sub-bass flute represents, in a way, the birth of something terrible. At 1:06 we have the still intact world, at 1:51 this world is met with terror, and at 3:29 the apocalypse runs its course, ending everything - and the halls remain empty.

Der Mond ist aufgegangen (German for ″The moon has risen″)
This title is an orchestral arrangement of the well-known German song by Johann Abraham Peter Schulz, whose basis is the poem Abendlied by Matthias Claudius.

The arrangement consists of the song form A-B-A' (the so-called ″Bogenform″ [german for ″Bow form″] with a deviating final part A'). Part A begins with the original 12-bar melody played by a viola and accompanied by the piano. An orchestral crescendo leads into Part B, in which first the string ensemble continues the main melody, still supported by the piano, but in a varying, counterpointing manner. After eight measures, the flute takes over the varied theme and, after another eight bars, concludes this second part. With a total of 16 bars, this variation extends the original not only melodically but also in length. The final part, A', again follows the original quite closely, this time in the form of an almost classical wind chorale. Low brass initially intones the original theme, which after six measures is additionally supported by the string ensemble, on which from halfway through the melody the high woodwinds complete the overall sound picture and lead to the musical climax.

Wehmut, stark wie Banyuls (German for ″Wistfulness, strong like Banyuls″)
The final piece on this album is again an adaptation, this time of Camille Saint-Saëns' Sonata for Bassoon and Piano, Op. 168 (the first part, Allegro moderato). This romantic piece is presented by Neuroth in the manner of a ballad in 6/8 time, with Robby Musenbichler's guitar leading the theme at first. Shortly before the end, a bassoon takes over the melody as in the original, accompanied by strings, organ, and harpsichord in the style of Ekseption.

== Cover ==
The cover, a caricature, is by 19th-century artist Honoré Daumier, coloured by Thomas Neuroth.

== Track listing ==
All tracks are written by Thomas Neuroth.

Fine Art track listing
No.	Title	Length
1.	"Fêtes"	10:25
2.	"Per Omnem Vitam"	4:51
3.	"God's Little Plan"	1:36
4.	"Florence Coleman Part One"	3:56
5.	"Florence Coleman Part Two"	3:11
6.	"The Angels of Sodom"	3:06
7.	"Die Geschichte vom kleinen Hähnchen"	2:32
8.	"The Distributor"	5:23
9.	"Der Mond ist aufgegangen"	2:59
10.	"Wehmut, stark wie Banyuls"	3:57
Total length:		41:56

The album was released both on LP and CD. Due to lack of space, "The Distributor" is not included on the LP version.

== Personnel ==
- Thomas Neuroth – keyboards
- Karel Szelnik – keyboards
- Valentin Neuroth – electric guitar
- Robby Musenbichler – electric guitar
- Rainer Kind – drums
- Gudula Rosa – recorder
- Gary Woolf – Western concert flute
- Sabine Fröhlich – violin, viola
