= Fine art (disambiguation) =

Fine art is art primarily made for aesthetics or creative expression.

Fine art may also refer to:

- Fine Art (software)
- Fine Art (Neuschwanstein album), 2016
- Fine Art (Kneecap album), 2024
