= Neyveli Solar Power Project =

Solar power project in India

Located in Tamil Nadu, NLC Neyveli Township Solar PV Park 1 is a 65MW solar PV power project commissioned in August 2017.Spread over an area of 357 acres, it is a ground-mounted solar project

with a project cost of $69.426 million. Developed in multiple phases, the project is currently active. The project got commissioned in August 2017.Under the power purchase agreement, the power generated is sold to Tamil Nadu Generation and Distribution. The power is sold at the rate of $0.067kWh for a period of 25 years. During his visit to the southern state of Tamil Nadu, the Prime Minister inaugurated the project along with the inauguration of 1GW Neyveli New Thermal Power Project.

Also, NLC plans to set up 4,000 MW of solar power projects across the country in Tamil Nadu, Kerala, Karnataka, Puducherry and Rajasthan. On 28 September 2015, NLC inaugurated 10 MW solar power plant at the Neyveli Township.
