= Sebkha-Chott =

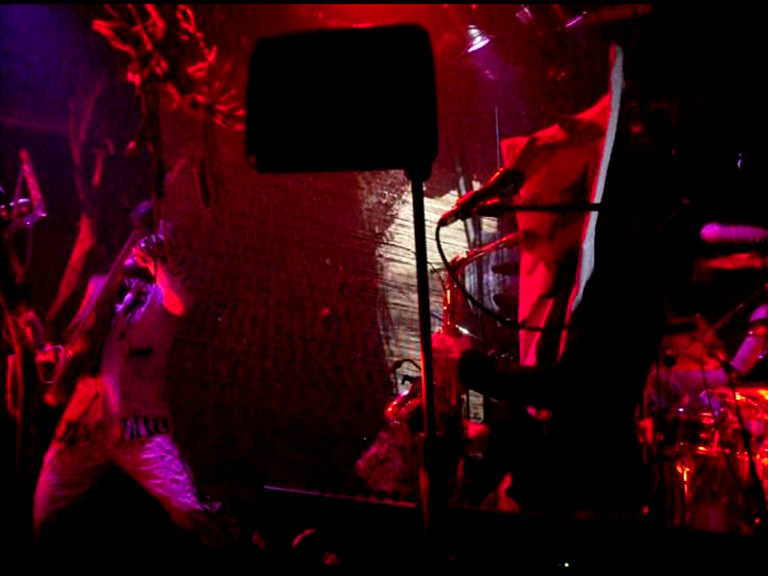
- Performing live in 2010

Background information
- Origin: Le Mans, Sarthe, France
- Genres: Progressive rock, avant-garde
- Years active: 1999-2015
- Labels: AMMD, Musea
- Members: Wladimir Ohrelianov II, Nots Awful Mitzahal Jaquie, Nots Awful Mitzahal Michel
- Past members: Yüla Slipobitch, Souv Ponky Ponk, VaGoDor Deu Sahpun, Tzom Trümb, Mustach'Man...

Sebkha-Chott is a French experimental rock band from Le Mans, France.

Distributed by a progressive rock label called Musea Records, the band incorporates very different styles and categories, including metal, jazz, and fusion. Not easily categorized, the band pretends playing self-proclamated musical styles: Mekanik Metal Disco (until 2008), Abstract Low Coast Hip Hop | Concrete Violence | AvantPorn Mekanik Metal from 2009, often condensed in: Bizarre AvantPorn Mekanik TheaterCore since 2012.

Sebkha-Chott has been compared to Frank Zappa, Magma, Mr. Bungle, and Fantômas.

The band is from early times deeply implied in an indie way of production and in free art.

== Biography ==
=== 1999 ===
Sebkha-Chott is created in Le Mans - France by Yüla Slipobitch and Wladimir Ohrelianov II (members of the band do not want their name to be known or spread), who were by that time studying at Université du Maine. Original line-up is the following:

- drums (Yüla Slipobitch)
- bass (Wladimir Ohrelianov II)
- two guitars
- keyboards
- vocals

=== 2000 ===
The line-up is taken back from scratch, only Wladimir Ohrelianov II and Yüla Slipobitch go on. New guitar player Antòn Pinokiov and keyboard player Alter Frabrovitch join the band. There is no singer.

The band records its first demo called Ma Kët I, which contains Bienvenue à Babylone and Pinok'ïo.

=== 2002 ===
A horn section joins Sebkha-Chott with Marx Bronosov on trombone and Labial Aerostick on alto saxophone. The band records a second demo called La Légende de l'ElectroMénager which contains 4 tracks: Manuel, Bienvenue à Babylone, La Descente de Frabrot le Vieil and Carpe Diem. Latin influences might be heard, especially in rhythm section, while the arrival of horns gives a jazz-funk/fusion touch to this album, turning Sebkha-Chott in a less metal band. First shows are performed by that period.

Horn section is enlarged with a trumpet played by Comte Benito Del Amafia.

=== 2002/2003 ===
Sebkha-Chott's first singer, Mustach'Man, joins the band, charismatic character who is going to lead the band in a theatrical way of performing shows. Mustach'Man will enter several characters in a single show. From this moment on, Sebkha-Chott's shows take the shape of burlesque theater, deploying the universe of an absurd dictatorship, led by a Joke Tyrant. This change is essential, as it's the beginning of the systematical use of mythological characters in every actions of Sebkha-Chott.

The album De l'Existence de la Mythologie Chottienne en 7 Cycles is recorded during 2002/2003, and is released at Autumn 2004, without any distribution at first. This album is distributed by Musea Records since 2006, under Musea Parallèle label.

Vedior Bis joins Sebkha-Chott as a sophisticated narrator.

During this recording session, comte Benito Del Amafia is replaced by Cristobal Del Amafia. They will play together in a unique show to Frank Zappa.

=== 2004 ===
- De l'Existence de la Mythologie Chottienne en 7 Cycles is released.
- Antòn Pinokiov leaves the band and is replaced by MerouMan.
- Horn section leaves Sebkha-Chott and is replaced by Comte P.A.Squale Del Amafia on alto and soprano saxophones,
- Tzom Trümb becomes Sebkha-Chott's trombone player shortly before P.A. Squale Del Amafia leaves the band.

=== 2005 ===
Mustach'Man leaves the band to enter a new chanson project called La Muette. He's replaced by Hrabe Black Sebbath (vocals) and Comtesse Gnania Del Amafia (vocals). Electronic Machines are integrated as Siphon Trounezöhle (machines) takes place in the band. Shortly before summer, MerouMan announce he will leave soon, and Capt'n Roses (guitar) replaces him. Both of them will play together on Nagah Mahdi. Nagah Mahdi's recording session is done during summer 2005, in MJC Plaine du Ronceray. For this purpose, Labial Aerostick, P.A.Squale Del Amafia et Mustach'Man reintegers the band, as well as many guests: Grümse (vocals - Electro Addict Band), Arno (vocals - Carnival in Coal), Petit Zornbergette (tap dance - Mentat Routage), David Rabillet (cajon), Mimetic Angel (vocals), Guilty (turntables - Anes et Bateaux / DJ Guilty), Jules Lefranc Gaulois Kaïser (percussions), VaGoDor Deu Sahpun (baritone saxophone), GenBaku (sound painting).

After a computer crash, part of the recording is lost. New recording sessions are made in October 2005. Release dare is rescheduled.

Alter Frabrovitch is replaced by Benoît Popol II on keyboards. VaGoDor Deu Sahpun joins Sebkha-Chott on baritone saxophone, and Jules Lefranc Gaulois Kaïser does the same on percussions.

=== 2006 ===
Hrabe Black Sebbath leaves the band; Wladimir Ohrelianov II, Benoît Popol II and Capt'n'Roses take the male vocals part. Nagah Mahdi - Opuscrits en 48 Rouleaux is released on Musea Parallèle, giving to Sebkha-Chott international visibility. De l'Existence de la Mythologie Chottienne en 7 Cycles is distributed by the same label from that date on. Nagah Mahdi'reviews are success, especially in the progressive rock ring.

Comtesse Del Amafia leaves Sebkha-Chott.

=== 2007 ===
Sebkha-Chott launches its first thematic tour, called Opération Coin Coin. They meet Sleepytime Gorilla Museum twice at this occasion. This meeting is of great importance concerning the future orientations of Sebkha-Chott.

=== 2008 ===
During summer, Sebkha-Chott simultaneously records [[Nigla[h] - Tapisseries Finex en XXX Strips et LXX/X Trompettes|Nigla[h]]] and De la Persistance onboard of Péniche Excelsior on the AMMD's studio. At the end of this recording sessions, Benoît Popol II and Jules LeFranc Gaulois Kaïser leaves the band. Keyboard will be shared by Wladimir Ohrelianov II and Tzom Trümb (through a MIDI vibe), and percussions will be played by Yüla Slipobitch mainly.

On 30 October, [[Nigla[h] - Tapisseries fines en XXX Strips et LXX/X Trompettes]] is released on Musea Records. This album sets a turning point by being much more dark and obscure than the previous ones, Sleepytime Gorilla Museum's being clearly hearable.

The band tours in Europe with Canadian band Unexpect to support the album. After this tour, Capt'n'Roses leaves the band. Sebkha-Chott enters a doubt period.

=== 2009 ===
During this period, some choices are made, VaGoDor Deu Sahpun and Siphon Trounezöhle leave the band.

Wladimir Ohrelianov II and Yüla Slipobitch décide to go on by integrating electronic machines in an intensive way, which is a historic will of the band, never made real due to lack of time.

De la Persistance de la Mythologie Chottienne en ??? Vélos is released on Musea Records.

Tzom Trümb leaves the band as Souv Ponky Ponk joins it on saxophone and lights management altogether with Cousin Sub on guitar and audioproduction. The shape is then double semi-quatuor, first half being on stage (Wladimir Ohrelianov II and Yüla Slipobitch) the other half being at FOH (Cousin Sub and Souv Ponky Ponk).

Mainly, this year is spent by setting up the new show and the machines/lights/VJing synchronization system. This system is based on free software only.

During summer, Cousin Sub leaves guitar and keeps only audio production. Wladimir Ohrelianov II takes the guitar added to the bass. Souv Ponky Ponk leaves FOH to get on stage.

=== 2010 ===
Sebkha-Chott goes back on tour, and cross road with Extra Life, another important meeting, which let the band even more sure about the new way he works sound as a global material.

During Summer, Sebkha-Chott plays at Zappanale, a German festival in celebration of Frank Zappa, sharing the line-up with Napoleon Murphy Brock, Robert Martin, Ike Willis...

From this tour, it appears that the technical setup is a bit too complex to prepare on stage; the band goes back working on it to make it easier to use.

[[Ne[XXX]t Epilog]] recording sessions begin during Winter.

=== 2011 ===
This year is mainly spent mixing the Ne[XXX]t Epilog and building new parts of the setup.

A new character appears: Tupac Promo, a character destined to communicate in Moron Languages with terrestrial people.

=== 2012 ===
Cousin Sub leaves Sebkha-Chott.

On Spring, Sebkha-Chott starts a new tour called The Ne[XXX]t Tour.

Ne[XXX]t Epilog v1.0 is physically released 2012, September the 22nd on AMMD / Musea Records / Dogmazic. The official announcement precises that the album will be digitally liberated on 2012, October the 18th on Spider Jessica's website.

=== Line-up history ===
- Bass: Wladimir Ohrelianov II (1999 → today)
- Drums: Yüla Slipobitch (1999 → today)
- Guitars:
  - Antòn Pinokiov (2000 → 2004)
  - Merouman (2004 → 2005)
  - Capt'ain Roses (2005 → 2008)
  - Siphon Trounezöhle (2008)
  - Cousin Sub (2009)
  - Wladimir Ohrelianov II (2009 → today)
- Keyboards:
  - Alter Frabrovitch (2000 → 2005)
  - Benoît Popol II (2005 → 2008)
  - Wladimir Ohrelianov II (2008)
- Saxophones:
  - Labial Aerostick - alto (2002 → 2004)
  - Comte P.A.Squale Del Amafia - alto/soprano (2004)
  - VaGoDor Deu Sahpun - alto/soprano/baritone (2005 → 2009)
  - Souv Ponky Ponk - alto/baritone (2009 → today)
- Trombones:
  - Marx Bronosov (2002 → 2004)
  - Tzom Trümb (2004 → 2009)
- Trumpets:
  - Benito Del Amafia (2002 → 2003)
  - Cristobal Del Amafia (2003 → 2004)
- Percussions:
  - Jules LeFranc Gaulois Kaïser - congas/davul/industrial percussions (2005 → 2008)
  - Tzom Trümb - vibes (2008)
  - Yüla Slipobitch - Tubular Bells, Glockenspiel (2009 → today)
- Vocals:
  - Mustach'Man (2003 → 2005)
  - Hrabe Black Sebbath (2005 → 2006)
  - Gnania Del Amafia (2005 → 2006)
  - Yüla Slipobitch (2005 → today)
  - Wladimir Ohrelianov II (2006 → today)
  - Benoît Popol II (2006 → 2008)
  - Capt'n Roses (2006 → 2008)
  - Souv Ponky Ponk (2009 → today)
- Machines:
  - Siphon Trounezöhle (2005 → 2009)
  - Wladimir Ohrelianov II (2003 and 2009 → today)
  - Souv Ponky Ponk (2009 → today)

== Mythology ==
=== Origins ===
Since the band creation, members of Sebkha-Chott made the choice to stay anonymous, and to hide behind fiction characters. Sebkha-Chott, currently named Sebkha-Chott Kourt, is a bunch of characters coming from a mythology invented by the band. This mythology is the only way the band communicates and appears through, as far as shows, web, interviews or even CDs are concerned.

The band calls this mythology Chottian Mythology or Ohrelander mythology

=== Universe ===
The Universe Sebkha-Chott's mythology is based on is an autocratic, violent and absurd universe. It lays on a set of locations/places, characters and concepts, several being well-documented, other being hard to comprehend. Absurd and non-sense humor are constants in this mythology, which sometimes forgets to precise it.

==== Ohreland ====
Ohreland is the country Sebkha-Chott's Kourt lives in. It is a strolling world, which has no contact with Earth, except during Sebkha-Chott's shows (called "stopovers" by the band).

Political system is a dictatorship longing since 10000 years (this duration does not change with time passing), with a unique tyrant: Wladimir Ohrelianov II.

On a topological point of view, Ohreland is a piece of terrestrial rock with a V8 motor. There are representations of Ohreland in every albums of the band, always from a quite far point of view. It seems that Ohreland is the mix between an organic part (roots) at his base, and an extremely urbanized zone (numerous buildings) on his high parts.

Members of Sebkha-Chott have explained that this world has been thought like a crossing point between Le Roi et l'Oiseau (Paul Grimault and Jacques Prévert), La Révolte à deux sous (Bernard Clavel) and several towns of Final Fantasy, en particulier les éditions VI, VII et VIII:

- a crappy downtown, deep into dust, without light, full of poor people,
- a luxurious hightown, technoïd, open to a small number of people (Sebkha-Chott's Kourt) only,
- a mix between Middle-Age architectures and high-tech object.

Its main city is Babylone, though there is no other Ohrelander town known. Sometimes Ohreland is presented as a city itself.

==== Characters ====
Ohreland's population is split into three parts (recently, mainly two):

- the elite, currently called Sebkha-Chott's Kourt (Kourt is a reference to the hip hop notion of Crew or Krew applied to French phonetics and mixed with royal semantic) - every members of Sebkha-Chott except Mustach'Man and Hrabe Black Sebbath did belong to Sebkha-Chott's Kourt,
- people, about who there is almost no information: their number is not known precisely (several billions are what comes the most often in the Tyrant's words, though it's not possible due to the small size of Ohreland), as well as the demographic repartition (the Tyrant recently told that Ohrelanders were 9999 years old) - people are interpreted by the audience in every Sebkha-Chott's appearance (shows, web, interviews, CDs...),
- the resistance network, composed by Mustach'Man firstly, and then by Hrabe Black Sebbath, which are the Tyrant's opponents. Since the leaving of Hrabe Black Sebbath, there is no more resistance network in Ohreland.

===== Sebkha-Chott's Kourt =====
It actually contains:

- Wladimir Ohrelianov II: Ohreland's Tyrant since 10000 years; it's an angry and pretentious character, loving to lose himself in everlasting improvised speeches, sometimes congratulating the audience (early times of the shows), sometimes really threatening (middle and end of shows). Wladimir Ohrelianov II's speeches use high-level vocabulary, despite the presence of brutal mood changes and several slang words and expressions.
- Yüla Slipobitch a.k.a Missy Phillis: prostitute in Ohreland since 10000 years, she also is Ohrelander army's leader. She's a power-girl, feminist, though really keen on every human delights, which might turn her into a perfect stupid girl. She almost doesn't speak, and actually only shouts. On very rare occasions, she might have been heard speaking in an intelligible French (last track of Nagah Mahdi - Opuscrits en 48 Rouleaux, in Ode Létale and on several communication clips of Sebkha-Chott).
- Souv Ponky Ponk alias Souvenette Sire Shô-De: Tyrant's factotum, he's the Occulocks MasterChief, which are the Tyrant's bodyguard as well as a milicia destined to people oppression. He also acts as an executioner during the shows. The hierarchy between Souv Ponky Ponk and Yüla Slipobitch is not firmly established, and sometimes changes. He's unable to use words and seems completely stupid, though absolutely faithful towards the Tyrant.
- Tupac Promo: he's the communication channel of Ohreland. He's a puppet on a string manipulated by Souv Ponky Ponk. Originally named Didier, he was re-called Tupac Promo in celebration of Tupac Shakur. Tupac Promo signs almost all moron-languages-communications of Sebkha-Chott (which means language with less high-level vocabulary and less link to Ohrelander mythology's dedicated semantic), and sometimes opens the shows.

===== Ohrelander Gods =====
In the GangbangoGenesis of Ohreland by Sebkha-Chott, one might read that several Gods have given Ohreland to Wladimir Ohrelianov II. Though, in Ohrelander mythology, there is only one God: Yvette H., Goddess of Death Musette Yvette firstly, and then of Mekanik Metal Disco. Her name is always followed by the assertion "Loués soient son dentiste et son coiffeur" (God bless her dentist and her hairdresser). There are some representations of Yvette H. on old posters of the band and she often speaks on Sebkha-Chott's website, which she created.

===== Ohrelander graves =====
Sebkha-Chott ex-members (called "deads" by Sebkha-Chott's Kourt) had the following roles to play:

- Lahfass Karcher: occulock
- Cousin Sub: occulock
- Tzom Trümb: milicia masterchief
- Siphon Trounezöhle: scientist
- VaGoDor Deu Sahpun: venusian albinos rastafarï
- Capt'n'Roses : pirate
- Benoît Popol II : ohrelander pope
- Jules LeFranc Gaulois Kaïser : Yüla Slipobitch's pimp
- Comtesse Gnania Del Amafia : ohrelander aristocrat
- Hrabe Black Sebbath : resistant vampire
- Alter Frabrovitch : army's leader
- MerouMan : sea super hero
- Mustach'Man : proteiform resistant
- Comte P.A.Squale Del Amafia : aristocrat
- Antòn Pinokiov : puppet on a string
- Comte Benito Del Amafia : aristocrat
- Filleul Cristobal Del Amafia : aristocrat
- Marx Bonosov : joke maker
- Labial Aerostick : televangelist
- Vedior Bis : narrator

==== Concepts and political engagements ====
Ohrelander mythology, characters, Tyrant's speeches and reactions of other characters are all means to communicate several concepts and political messages that members of Sebkha-Chott want to share, through absurdity and ab absrubio demonstrations. In particular, Ohrelander mythology supports:

- vegetarism (and antispecism in general), all Sebkha-Chott's Kourt characters are vegetarians;
- feminism (especially porn-feminism or pro-sex feminism), through Yüla Slipobitch, mainly, but also through several reference objects (Two-fingers Holy Hand Trinity);
- ecology: several times, Wladimir Ohrelianov II spoke about using dry toilets in Ohreland, and also clean-propulsion systems (bathroom-nuclearo-plastico physics, which is an ironic reference to nuclear physics and its self-proclamated security), the idea of turning the audience into compost also has been proposed in concert;
- anarchism, with numerous attacks towards democraty as a system reproducing jungle law in a social manner.

== Live Show Experiences ==
Sebkha-Chott's shows are the very moment in which Ohreland exists. In each concert, a hierarchy is established between Sebkha-Chott's Kourt and the audience (which takes the role of the people).

The atmosphere in Sebkha-Chott's show is quite particular: the absurd basement is such that the content might not be taken seriously, though, the audience solicitation is so strong (especially when the audience doesn't react spontaneously) that kind of an embarrassment or even mistrust might occur. Whatever might be the audience reactions, Sebkha-Chott's Kourt lays on them to build the show. Each concert thus is a unique event, as neither the setlist, nor the speeches are defined by advance. Still, there are some never-changing things: the shows open on a triumphal incoming of the Kourt (since 2007), which quickly leads to Tyrant's speech, and they end up on the death of every member of Sebkah-Chott's Kourt, killed by the Tyrant, mainly.

== Discography ==
=== Albums ===
==== De l'Existence de la Mythologie Chottienne en 7 Cycles ====
- release date : 2004 - sold out
- Production : AMMD
- Distribution (worldwide) : Musea Records
- Artwork : Slip
- Recording : Sebkha-Chott
- Mix/Mastering : Pascal Berthault (AMS)
- Line-up :
  - Yüla Slipobitch : Drums/Vocals
  - Wladimir Ohrelianov II : Bass/Machines/Speech/Vocals
  - Alter Frabrovitch : Keyboards/Theater
  - Anton Pinokiov : Guitars
  - Labial Aerostick : Saxophones
  - Marx Bronosov : Trombone
  - Cristobal Del Amafia : Trompette
  - Mustach'Man : Vocals
- Track list :
  1. Pinok'ïo
  2. Pour le Comte Del Amafia
  3. Le Cirque des Enfers
  4. Carpe Diem
  5. Bienvenue à Babylone
  6. Manuel
  7. La Chute d'Ohreland

==== Nagah Mahdi - Opuscrits en 48 Rouleaux ====
- Release date: 2006 - second edition in 2008
- Production: AMMD
- Distribution (worldwide): Musea Records
- Artwork: Slip
- Recording/Mix: Pascal Berthault (AMS)
- Mastering: Raphaël Jaunin (Dyam)
- Line-up:
  - Yüla Slipobitch: Drums
  - Wladimir Ohrelianov II: Bass/Speech/Guitars
  - Alter Frabrovitch: Keyboards/Clarinet
  - Capt'n Roses: Guitars
  - Labial Aerostick: Alto saxophone
  - P.A.Squale Del Amafia: Soprano saxophone
  - VaGoDor Deu Sahpun: Baritone saxophone
  - Tzom Trümb: Trombone
  - Hrabe Black Sebbath: Vocals
  - Gnania Del Amafia: Vocals
  - Mimetic Archangel: Vocals
  - Arno Strobl (Carnival In Coal): Vocals
  - Grümse (Electro Addict Band): Vocals
  - Petite Zornberguette (Mentat Routage): Claquettes
  - Jules LeFranc Gaulois Kaïser: Percussions
  - David Rabillet: Cajon
- Track list:

The album is split in a 48 pieces track list, every piece called with a bay or beach name, in reference to Dead Sea Scrolls.

- Concept:

Nagah Mahdi means, in Arabic language, the Prophet sources (or origines). The words Opuscrits and Rouleaux (French word for scrolls) are chosen in reference to the Dead Sea Scrolls. Mostly, all the concepts on which this album lays, are inspired by part of the visions of Horselover Fat in Philip K. Dick's novel VALIS, especially some confusions between Nag Hammadi (homophonic to Nagah Mahdi in French pronunciation) and Qumran caves. This bunch of sources related one with the others, but not strictly linked, leads to a nebulous and abstractive concept, hard to explain clearly. All following albums of Sebkha-Chott will use the same kind of nebulous concepts.

==== Nigla[h] - Tapisseries Fines en XXX Strips et LXX/X Trompettes ====
- Release Date: 2008
- Production: AMMD
- Distribution (worldwide): Musea Records
- Artwork: Slip + Tzom Trümb + Grümse
- Recording/Mix/Mastering: Cousin Sub
- Line-up:
  - Yüla Slipobitch: Drums/Percussions
  - Wladimir Ohrelianov II: Drums/Speech/Vocals/Classical guitar
  - Benoît Popol II: Keyboards/Vocals
  - Capt'n Roses: Guitars
  - Matthieu Metzger (Anthurus d'Archer, Nasal Retentive Orchestra, Louis Sclavis, Marc Ducret Big Band): Alto and sopranino saxophones
  - Cédric Thimon (Zéphyrologie, Glück): Soprano saxophone
  - VaGoDor Deu Sahpun: Baritone saxophone
  - Frédéric Gastard (Campagnie des Musique à Ouïr, Melosolex, Journal Intime): Bass saxophone
  - Tzom Trümb: Trombone
  - ???: Trombone
  - Geoffroy: Bass trombone
  - Tergal: Bass horn
  - Simon Fleury (City Weezle): Vocals
  - Def (Enhuma, Valse Noot): Vocals
  - Gnania Del Amafia: Vocals
  - Emmanuelle Renault: Vocals
  - Matthias Deschang: Vibraphone
  - Zonder Munster (Gebanku Orchestra, Zonder Zeep): Sound painting direction
  - Amaël: Vocals
  - Cécile: Violin
  - Antonin: Upright and cello
  - Ludovic: Harpsichord
- Track list:

The album is split in 72 tracks, in reference to the 72 translations of the Septuagint.

- Concept:

The album is composed around Armageddon (which is a translation of Nigla[h]) and especially the seven (LXX/X) trumpets of the Book of Revelation. The 72 tracks split is a reference to the Septuagint, as well as the LXX roman number. Finally, Tapisseries fines is an humoristic reference to the Apocalypse Tapestry. The concept's idea came by reading the description of Abaddon in the New Testament (Book of Revelation), which was given to artworker Slip as a challenge for the artwork creation, as graphical representation of the Locusts King from this description seem impossible. It's the character who's illustrated on the cover.

- Technics:

This album has been recorded in the AMMD studio, a recording studio running on free software only, and based upon a Debian Linux distribution.

==== De la Persistance de la Mythologie Chottienne en ??? Vélos ====
- Release Date: 2009
- Production: AMMD
- Distribution (worldwide): Musea Records
- Artwork: Slip + Tzom Trümb + Grümse
- Recording/Mix/Mastering: Cousin Sub
- Line-up:
  - Yüla Slipobitch: Drums/Percussions
  - Wladimir Ohrelianov II: Drums/Speech/Vocals/Classical guitar
  - Benoît Popol II: Keyboards/Vocals
  - Capt'n Roses: Guitars
  - Matthieu Metzger (Anthurus d'Archer, Nasal Retentive Orchestra, Louis Sclavis, Marc Ducret Big Band): Alto and sopranino saxophones
  - Cédric Thimon (Zéphyrologie, Glück): Soprano saxophone
  - VaGoDor Deu Sahpun: Baritone saxophone
  - Frédéric Gastard (Campagnie des Musique à Ouïr, Melosolex, Journal Intime): Bass saxophone
  - Tzom Trümb: Trombone
  - ???: Trombone
  - Geoffroy: Bass trombone
  - Tergal: Bass horn
  - Simon Fleury (City Weezle): Vocals
  - Def (Enhuma, Valse Noot): Vocals
  - Gnania Del Amafia: Vocals
  - Emmanuelle Renault: Vocals
  - Matthias Deschang: Vibraphone
  - Zonder Munster (Gebanku Orchestra, Zonder Zeep): Sound painting direction
  - Amaël: Vocals
  - Cécile: Violin
  - Antonin: Upright and cello
  - Ludovic: Harpsichord
- Track list:

The album is split in 48 phone messages and 6 musical tracks.

- Concept :

This album is a derivative of Sebkha-Chott's early album, De l'Existence de la Mythologie Chottienne en 7 Cycles. 2004's album wondered whether a Chottian mythology did exist, its 2009's derivative claims it existed, is existing and will exist (Persistance). As such, this album is placed between Nagah Mahdi (Prophet's origines) and before Nigla[h] (Apocalypse) in terms of chronology, and that's why it begins with 48 phone messages, as Nagah Mahdi ended up on an automatic phone message by Yüla Slipobitch.

- Technics:

This album has been recorded in the AMMD studio, a recording studio running on free software only, and based upon a Debian Linux distribution.

==== The Ne[XXX]t Epilog ====
- Release date: 2012
- Production: AMMD
- Distribution (worldwide): Musea Records / Dogmazic
- Artwork: Slip
- Recording/Mix/Mastering : Cousin Sub
- Line-up:
  - Yüla Slipobitch: Drums/Tubular Bells/Vocals
  - Wladimir Ohrelianov II: Bass/Guitars/Machines/Grötterie/Vocals
  - Souv Ponky Ponk: Saxophone/Vocals
- Track list:

The 1.0 physical version of this album is split into 22 tracks, distributed between 4 transitions and 18 movements composing 5 acts.

- Concept :

Concept of this album is based upon the fact that Times don't exist as an obliged way, and that chronology might be turned upside/down. This is what the title, Ne[XXX]t Epilog, suggests. This concept follows the one being initially described in De la Persistance de la Mythologie Chottienne en ??, Vélos.

- Technics:

This album has been recorded in the AMMD studio, a recording studio running on free software only, and based upon a Debian GNU/Linux distribution.

== Politics, art, philosophy ==
Sebkha-Chott's decisions, way, global manner of doing things are ruled by a firm political engagement towards indie music, ecology and free art. The creation of the AMMD, in 2003, was an answer to the need to work with a structure/label which might support such an ethic. More about this engagement might be read on the band website on a dedicated page, or heard (in French) in a radio emission (Symbiose) dedicated to the AMMD, diffused on Radio Libertaire in Paris on 2012, June, the 16th.
