= Alice in Wonderland (Neuschwanstein album) =

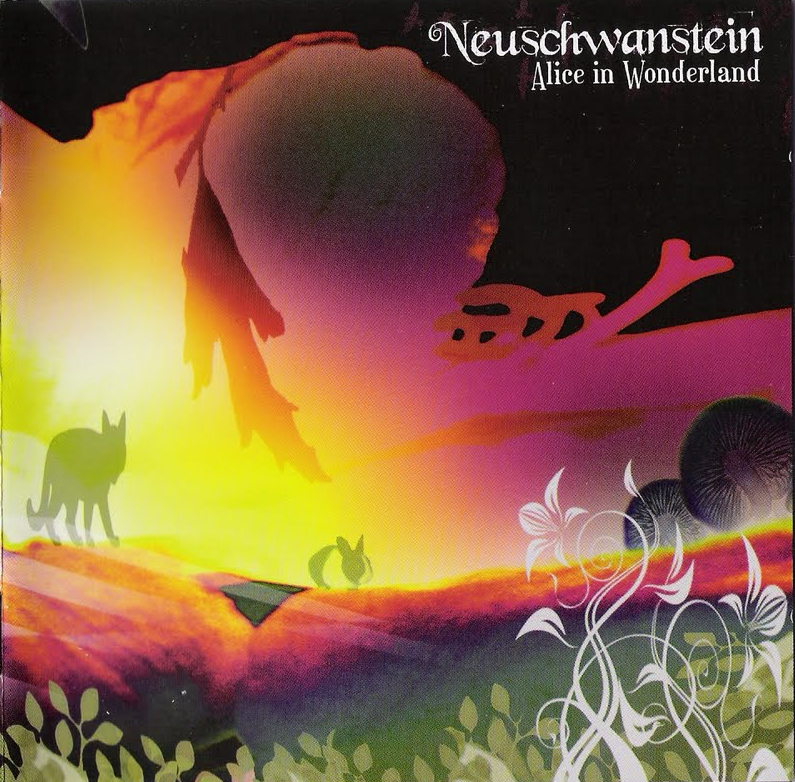

Studio album by Neuschwanstein
- Released: 2008
- Recorded: 1976
- Studios: F4 Studio, Saarbrücken-Güdingen (Germany)
- Genre: Progressive Rock
- Length: 40:46
- Labels: Musea Records, Cherry Red Records
- Producers: Bernard Gueffier (Musea) & Leonardo Nahoum (Rock Symphony)

Neuschwanstein chronology
Battlement (1979)	Alice in Wonderland (2008)	Fine Art (2016)

Alice in Wonderland is the second album by the German progressive rock band Neuschwanstein, although in terms of the recording date it was actually the group's first production, which was also not supposed to be released as an album. Originally intended as a demo tape in 1976, the French label Musea finally released it as a CD in 2008.

== History ==
Thomas Neuroth and Klaus Mayer, who were both students at a local secondary school (with 6th form) in Völklingen, Saarland, got to know each other there in the early 1970s. Their musical idols were Rick Wakeman (his solo albums), King Crimson and Genesis from the Peter Gabriel era. Wakeman's albums The Six Wives of Henry VIII and Journey to the Centre of the Earth (epic pieces) particularly impressed them. Owing to their classical music training - Thomas Neuroth learned piano, Klaus Mayer flute - and their passion for symphonic progressive rock, they decided to form a band to realize their musical ideas. The result was the founding of Neuschwanstein.

After several personnel changes, a more permanent form of the band emerged in 1974. Besides Neuroth and Mayer, the band consisted of Udo Redlich (guitar), Hans Peter Schwarz (drums) and Uli Limpert (bass guitar). The strong impression Rick Wakeman's Journey to the Centre of the Earth left on Neuroth and Mayer prompted them to compose a long piece of instrumental music as well, and they subsequently worked on the musical adaptation of the famous Lewis Carroll novel Alice in Wonderland.

However, the idea for it and the first attempts to realise the piece had already been made in 1970; all that was missing was the final impulse. The first performance of this 40-minute musical piece took place in 1974 at a local secondary school. In 1975, Neuschwanstein performed it to win a band competition at the Saarland State Theatre in Saarbrücken; the audience was enchanted by the orchestral and melodic richness of their arrangement.

"We want to make music that is in contrast to the usual music styles, such as rock, jazz or the like. Of course, we let ourselves be influenced, but no more or less than any other musician who listens to a lot of music himself. With Neuschwanstein, there is no emphasis on improvisation. We see ourselves less as creative performers and more as creative constructors. Improvisations are mostly emotionally conditioned and do not always guarantee an optimum. Without copying Genesis or Wakeman, we want to present the audience with more than just a song, but a pleasure for the ear and the eye."

— Thomas Neuroth, Saarland music magazine GUCKLOCH (12/76)

In the new cast, Neuschwanstein not only honed their music but also devised an elaborate stage decoration as well as complex visual effects with masks and costumes, similar to those used by Genesis in Peter Gabriel's time. Even slides were projected at the back of the stage, with Limpert, and later Weiler, reciting the song sequences, interspersed with illustrations of the story. Even a forest decoration was set up on stage, with a printed curtain behind the projected illustrations. Phosphorescent colours were painted on the leaves of the trees so that they glowed in the dark. The musicians' masks corresponded to their roles in the story: Neuroth was the wizard, Weiler the griffin, etc. Although there was a constant lack of both time and money, Neuschwanstein's show was amazing and very professional by more than ″local heroes″ standards.

In 1975, two new members joined the band: Rainer Zimmer, replacing Uli Limpert on bass, and Roger Weiler, who took over for Udo Redlich on guitar. The live performances were of course accompanied by various costume parties, as was the case with Gabriel. The audience's reaction to the stage shows and the music was corresponding: it was the first time a German rock band performed such a long piece of music, with backdrops, costumes, masquerade and special effects. However, they were not spared from small mishaps. For example, at his very first concert with the group, Weiler had the misfortune to have his griffin mask with its large and heavy beak fall off. He had put the mask on too hectically before the performance and had not tied it properly.

In April 1976, Neuschwanstein booked a small recording studio near Saarbrücken to record their Alice in Wonderland on tape. This recording was intended as a demo tape for potential promoters. It was not until 32 years later, in 2008, that the French label Musea released the demo tape on CD for the first time. This demo tape lay in the form of a music cassette in the cupboard of Neuschwanstein guitarist Roger Weiler for a long time; at the beginning of the 2000s, Weiler told the people in charge at Musea about the tape, immediately arousing their interest. Although the sound quality was rather modest, Musea was confident that they could bring the tape up to an acceptable technical standard. Their great interest was also based on the fact that Neuschwanstein's ″official″ album Battlement was the best-selling album in the Musea catalogue.

Despite the largely positive reviews, Thomas Neuroth later commented:

"Alice in Wonderland is heart and soul, enthusiasm, charm and ambition. A firstling, unfinished and flawed. Alice in Wonderland was meant to be momentary and ephemeral. I never thought it would ever be published."

From today's perspective, Neuschwanstein paved the way for many other German progressive rock bands with this album.

"It is almost a model for the idea of such an album, typical of the German soul of the poets/thinkers of the 70s."

— Henning Mangold, Babyblaue Seiten

Shortly after the recordings, Frédéric Joos (from France) joined the band as a new singer, with a voice very reminiscent of Peter Gabriel, but also of Strawbs singer Dave Cousins. In 1978 the band recorded their first album Battlement in Cologne at the Scorpions' studios, leading to unexpected success in 1979. Amidst new wave and punk, it survived as one of the few finest albums by German progressive rock bands.

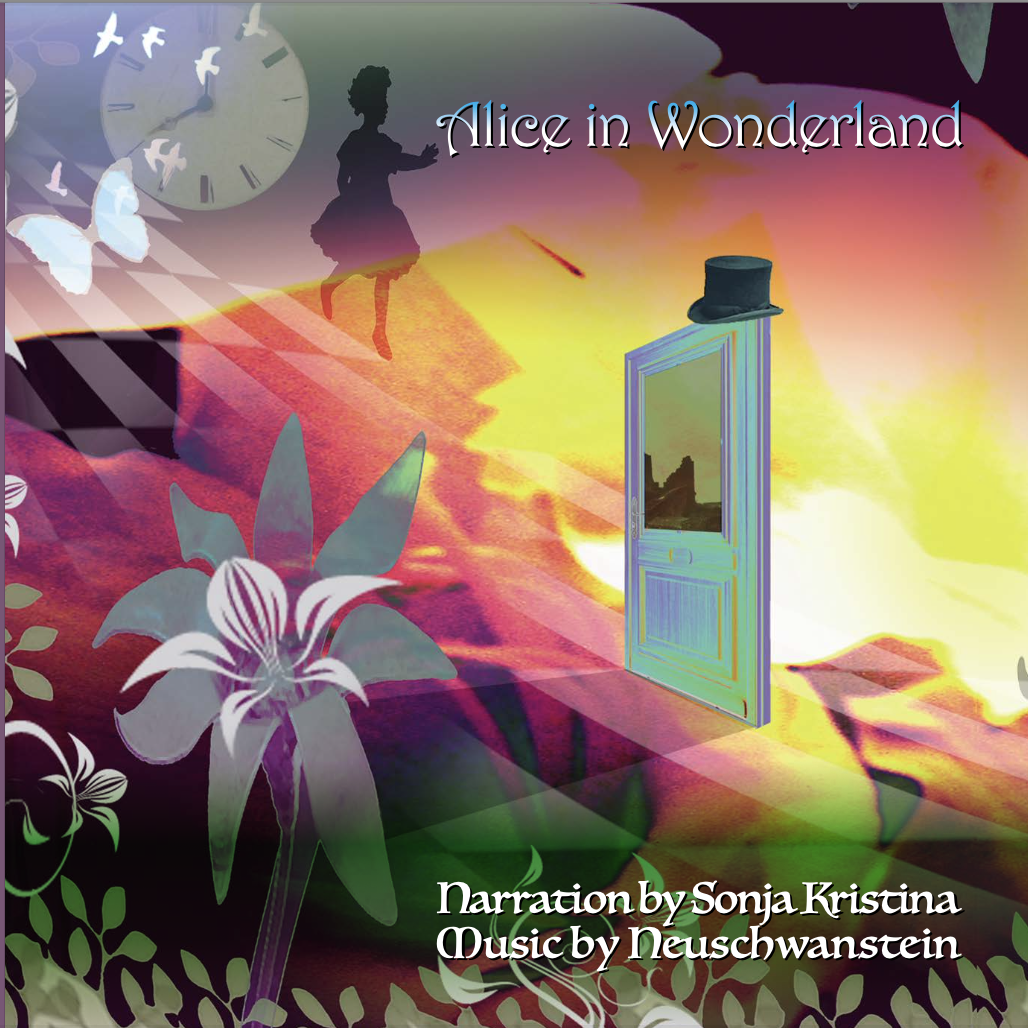
Cover of the new edition of 2022

On 18 November 2022, after 46 years, a re-release was released on the Explore Rights Management label (a sub-label of Cherry Red Records). Since the tape on which the 2008 CD version of Musea was based was a cassette copy, an attempt was made to find the original master tape. In fact, various reels of tape were rediscovered from guitarist Roger Weiler, but all turned out to be blank. The old recordings were painstakingly restored, with the production team benefiting from new software, without which the project would have been doomed from the start. Since the narrator's voice and the music were mixed, the voice had to be filtered out of the music first. The first attempts were not satisfactory, but then with a new AI-controlled software, AudioShake, it was possible to remove the narration completely without damaging the background tracks. The narration was taken directly from the original book, keeping the adaptation to a minimum. However, some of the Mad Hatter's outbursts were borrowed from other chapters to match the number of theatrically sung passages to the music. The new lyrics were voiced by Sonja Kristina, singer with Curved Air. The cover was slightly changed and the booklet revised.

== Track listing ==
All tracks are written by Thomas Neuroth, Klaus Mayer and Roger Weiler.

No.	Title	Length
1.	"White Rabbit"	1:17
2.	"Gate To Wonderland"	2:13
3.	"Pond Of Tears"	2:45
4.	"Old Father's Song"	8:31
5.	"Five-O'Clock Tea"	6:49
6.	"Palace Of Wonderland"	12:05
7.	"The Court Of The Animals"	5:01
8.	"Alice's Return"	2:05
Total length:		40:46

== Personnel ==
- Thomas Neuroth – keyboards
- Klaus Mayer – flute, Keyboards
- Roger Weiler – electric guitar, Narration
- Rainer Zimmer – bass
- Hans Peter Schwarz – drums

== Sources ==
- Helm, Roland; Küntzer, Norbert (2011). Saar Rock History – Volume 1 & 2. Saarbrücken: H. Raueiser GmbH. ISBN 978-3-87661-037-5.
- Grosse, Francis (1992). Battlement (booklet). Neuschwanstein. Metz: Musea.
- Grosse, Francis (2008). Alice in Wonderland (booklet). Neuschwanstein. Metz: Musea.
- Grosse, Francis; Merkel, Hans-Juergen (2022). Alice in Wonderland (booklet). Neuschwanstein. Newcastle Upon Tyne: Explore Rights Management.
