= Jack Dupon =

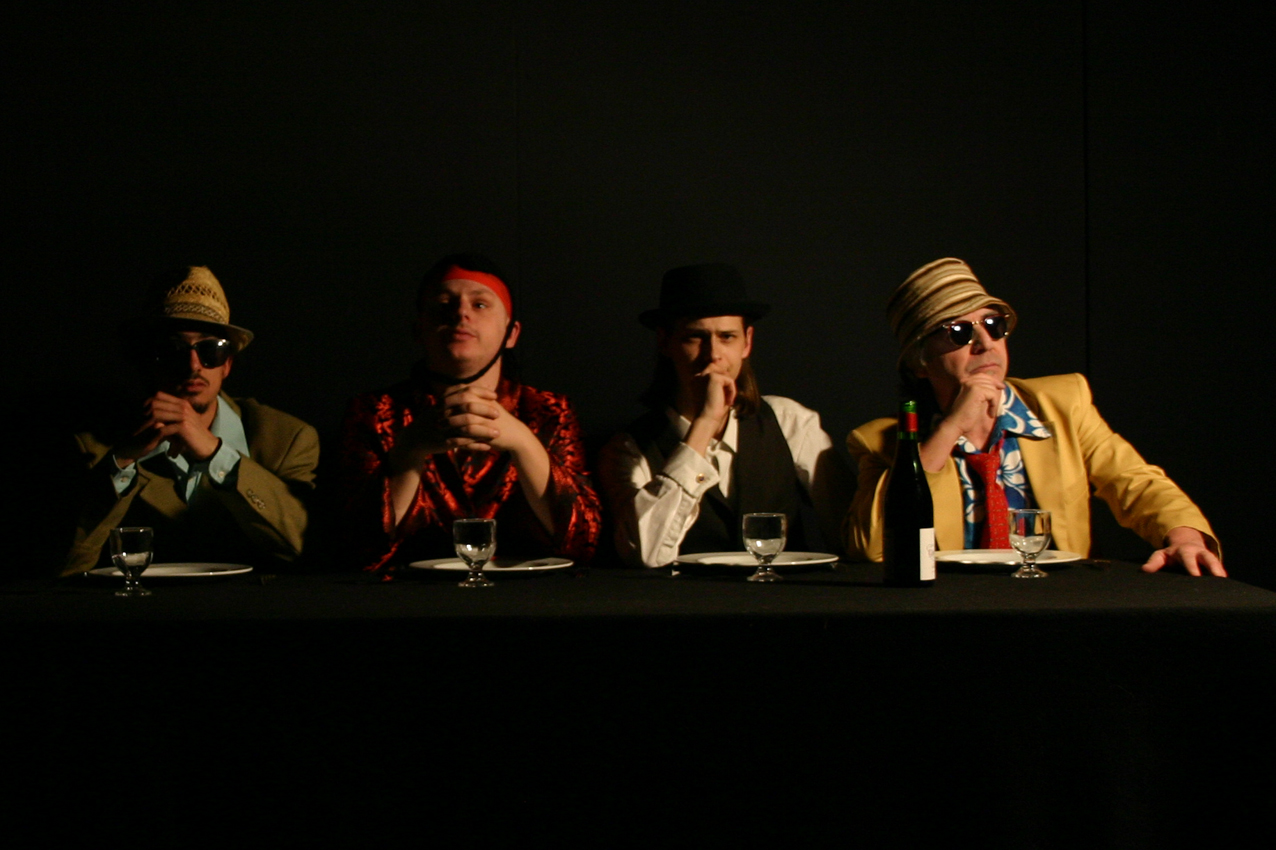

Background information
- Origin: France
- Genres: Rock, progressive rock, Rock in Opposition
- Years active: Since 2004
- Labels: Musea, Transit Music Group.
- Website: Jack Dupon's homepage

Jack Dupon is a French progressive rock band. The band's music is created in a "scientific-empirical" way, based on themes, using counter melodies and poly-rhythms performed by one or several of the musicians, and with total improvisations during live performances or recorded and reworked in the studio. They are often labeled by the media as the worthy heirs of Frank Zappa, King Crimson and Gong. Onstage Jack Dupon, a fictionalized character, travels back and forth through time to help in bettering the world.

== History ==
The group, formed in 2004 in the Auvergne region of France, is composed of Thomas Larsen (drums and vocals), Arnaud M'Doihoma (bass and vocals), Gregory Pozzoli (guitar and vocals) and Philip Prebet (guitars and vocals). Winners of several rock music contests, including the Bilborock Festival in 2007, Villa de Bilbao, Spain.

They recorded their first self-produced album The Missing African [L’Africain Disparu] in 2006 and signed with the label Musea Records, on which they released their second album The Ladder of Desire [L’Echelle Du Desir] in 2008, The band's third full-length album Demon Bold [Demon Hardi] was released in 2011 on the Musea /Transit Music Group [TMG] labels. The group has toured extensively nationally and internationally, including a tour in the United States organized by Transit Music Group in 2010, with several concerts, including the ProgDay Festival in Chapel Hill, North Carolina and Orion Sound Studio in Baltimore, Maryland and performances in Boston, MA, and New York City, NY, among others.

In 2011, the band embarked on a large tour in Europe across Slovenia, Croatia, Bosnia, Serbia, Romania, Germany, Poland, Latvia, Spain and England, with their first appearance being at the RIO: Rock In Opposition Festival.

They released the double live album, Bascule à Vif in 2012 and played at the Zappanale Festival in Bad Doberan, Germany amongst Magma, George Duke & Jean-Luc Ponty : Brothers of Invention, and Alice Cooper. They were also in Poland at the experimental music festival Energia Dzwieku with BLURT, Gedaliah Tazartes, and were the opening act for GONG at the "Abattoirs" in Bourgoin-Jallieu, France.

JackDupon released a new concept album called "Jesus l'aventurier" in 2013 and created a music-drawing performance called "Monsters" with the artist Fariho. They made a few concerts in France and Belgium with that project and were back on the road to Spain, Switzerland, Germany, and Poland. Back home they prepared their first live video for the DVD which was released in 2014, with surrealistic videos shot by/with the members of the band and with clay animation footage. The live album was released in parallel and they did several promotion tours in Europe : El Sud Tour : France-Spain / Animal Freak Tour : France-Belgium-Luxembourg-Germany / Steam Locomotive Tour : Poland-Germany. To close this important year, they organized a mini Festival for the 10th anniversary of the band in their neighborhood with Guigou Chenevier, Djevara, Mind Poetry, Mucho Tapioca, Benco Box, SEC, Babayaga and Witold Oleszak.

After that, they made their first tour in Canada in 2015 with an appearance at the Contemporary Music Festival of Victoriaville, the FIMAV, in Québec, with OvO, Deerhoof, Marc Ribot, and Laibach. JackDupon were quoted in David Rassent's book : Psychedelic Rock : a journey through 150 albums in 2016 and released a new studio album called Empty Full Circulation featuring Paul Sears from The Muffins with English lyrics for the first time. In 2017, after their tour in Spain, they were invited by Mani Neumeier : former and member of the Kraut Rock band GURU GURU to play at the Finki Festival in Mani's hometown. The latest concerts brought JackDupon on stage with Marillion and Gens de la lune at the Rock au Château Festival invited by Françis Décamps himself and were the opening act of Acid Mothers Temple in 2018 at Clermont-Ferrand, France.

The 15th anniversary of JackDupon was celebrated in 2019 with the release of several splits with bands from the whole world on cassettes and listenable on the band's Bandcamp page. They are also preparing a new studio album.

== Discography ==
=== Albums ===
- L'Africain disparu (2006)
- L'Échelle du désir (2008)
- Démon Hardi (2011)
- Bascule à vif (2012) double live album
- Jesus l'aventurier (2013)
- Tête de Chien (2014) live album
- Empty full circulation (2016) english singing
- JACKDUPOULAINPONJAR (2019) split with PoulainJar cassette
- JACKDUNOISEFROMPONMARS split with Noise From Mars cassette
- JAULPACKDUPONSEARS split with Paul Sears cassette
- JACKOOZDUPULTRON split with Ultra Zook cassette
- La République Dominicale du Zoo (2021)
- Toucan (2024)

== Videos ==
- 2006 : La Secte des Mouches - music video
- 2007 : Bilborock - concert filmed in Bilbao
- 2008 : Live TV Show on Clermont Premiere TV
- 2008 : Pig Monster - clip
- 2009 : Coopérative de Mai - live concert
- 2010 : La Cousine du Grand Mongol - music video
- 2011 : Baron Samedi - clip
- 2011 : Hardi Yokais (clip)
- 2011 : Démon Hardi - USA Tour documentary
- 2013 : Ulysse (clip)
- 2017 : C'est bien sûr (clip)
- 2019 : Fanfaronnades Vidéofilmées ( short movie )
- Histoire d'une jambe ( 1st cassette with PoulainJar )
- Du lilas à Pekin ( PoulainJar split )
- Rouge de couleur poison ( 2nd cassette with Noise From Mars )
