= Musea Records =

French record label

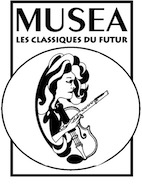
- Founded: 1985
- Founder: Francis Grosse, Bernard Gueffier
- Genre: Progressive Rock
- Country of origin: France
- Location: Metz
- Official website: www.musearecords.com

Musea Records (slogan: Les classiques du futur, French for "The classics of the future") is a French non-profit recording company founded in 1985 by Francis Grosse and Bernard Gueffier in Dombasle-sur-Meurthe, specialising in progressive rock. Musea also acts as a distributor for associated smaller labels and operates an online shop. "Musea" is an obsolete plural form of "museums", aptly representing the catalogue of artists and bands published and produced. In 1996, Musea Records moved its business headquarters to Metz.''

== History ==
Grosse and Gueffier met in 1981 at a festival in Reims. Gueffier was able to persuade Grosse to write for his music fanzine Notes, which was devoted mainly to the unfashionable trends in music at the time. The following year, they began compiling a discography of French releases from progressive rock, folk, fusion and electronic music, which appeared in 1984 under the title La Discographie du Rock Français. The first edition included a compact cassette with unreleased tracks by Troll, Uppsala, Eskaton and other bands whose albums were difficult to obtain due to poor or complete lack of music management. The success of the book was such that, after the first edition quickly sold out, a second revised edition was published in 1986 and a third completely revised edition in 1994. In 2000, Musea also published the Encyclopédie Des Musiques Progressives by Jean-Louis Lafiteau.

Gueffier and Grosse found that most musicians working in these unpopular styles were rejected by a commercial system. Bernard Gueffier commented on this in an interview in 2014 as follows:

[…] in the 80’s, I observed that all record companies forgot about Progressive Rock and turned to more profitable styles such as Punk or New Wave. I found particularly inacceptable that any music style may be condamned [sic] only for profit reasons

So it quickly became clear to Gueffier and Grosse that the solution could only be to have to distribute this music as a self-production. Another aspect came to the fore: Since they came into contact with many artists through the development of the discography and at the same time the demand for albums by these very artists increased among many readers, the two felt inspired to set up a record company. In November 1985, Gueffier and Grosse then founded Musea Records.

The first activity was to collect the stock of non-distributed albums by French artists in the fields of progressive rock, jazz-rock/fusion and new age music. The publication of a catalogue made it possible to sell them both to private customers and to wholesalers in France and abroad. At the time, this catalogue comprised about one hundred titles and consisted mainly of in-house productions that became collector's items: DÜN, Falstaff, Synopsis, Eider Stellaire, Nuance were some of the first bands to sell their albums this way.

Then, in March 1986, Musea started its own production with the album Jeux De Nains by Jean-Pascal Boffo. Stylistically, the album resembled some of Steve Hackett's pieces. From the beginning, Musea was keen to treat each album as a complete work, where music, cover, concept and lyrics should be part of a coherent whole. One of Musea's greatest achievements was the re-release of long-forgotten albums by groups such as Sandrose, Pulsar, Arachnoid or Acyntia, which belong to the milestones of French progressive rock history.

In the early 1980s, the CD format was introduced. Musea had previously only released vinyl albums, but in 1987 they decided to produce on CD as well. Since the size of the CD box did not allow for the same design possibilities as the vinyl albums, the label founders, together with a meanwhile expanded staff, decided to create elaborate booklets with a wealth of information, texts and pictures of the respective artists.

Original master tapes were also often restored and released with additional, previously unreleased material. A typical example is the Neuschwanstein album Alice in Wonderland from 2008, which was originally only available as a demo cassette. The cassette was elaborately sound-engineered to an acceptable sound standard and released as a CD together with an extensive booklet. Another example of Musea's efforts to revive lost material is the album Vermod by the Swedish band Anekdoten. Initially self-produced, the album was subsequently bought up by the Japanese label Arcàngelo and sound upgraded. However, the print run was quite small and quickly disappeared from the market. Musea then later offered the band to upgrade the original master tapes to a similarly high sound standard as the Japanese edition.

Musea's reputation for bringing back to light the lost treasures of progressive rock has now spread far beyond France. Artists from all over the world contacted Musea to release their own projects through this label. As this was not just progressive rock, sub-labels were founded: e.g. in 1988 "Musea Parallèle", dedicated to jazz-rock/fusion music, and in 1994 "Brennus Music", which focused on heavy metal. Other sub-labels for a wide variety of musical genres were to follow: Angular Records (Neo-Prog), Gazul (New Music), Ethnea (Folk and World Music), Dreaming (Electronic music and New-age), Bluesy Mind (Blues rock) and many more.

The historical reappraisal of numerous older, mostly out-of-print productions also interested foreign labels, which made licensing agreements with Musea to release certain titles from the Musea catalogue in their respective countries, such as South Korea, Japan or even Russia. But the system also worked in the opposite direction: Musea could acquire licences from foreign companies in order to be able to publish them in Europe. Outstanding examples of this are the Pink Floyd tribute album Pigs And Pyramids (2002) under the leadership of Billy Sherwood (ex-Yes) or also the comeback album Focus 8 by Focus. Also the Procol Harum albums from the 1970s were reissued by Musea in Digipak format.

The re-release of older albums by the Swedish band Kaipa deserves a special mention. The reissues sold so well that it inspired the band to re-unit in 2000.

Musea not only produces groups and individual artists, however, but also supports them at live events. From 1994 to 2000, for example, the label participated in "ProgFest", the oldest and best-known progressive rock festival in the USA. Recordings of such live performances were also recorded and released. Since 1997, there have been participations in the "Baja Prog" in Mexicali near San Diego (USA), or the "NEARfest" (USA), the "Prog'Sud" (France) and the "Rio ArtRock Festival" (Brazil).In 2024, Émile Jacotey, Ange's 1975 concept album, was remastered. In 2025, Musea Records released a new vinyl reissue of Hatfield and the North, the first vinyl reissue of the album since 1982.

== Bands ==
Musea published or is publishing albums by the following musicians and bands, among others:

- Abacus
- Anekdoten
- Ange
- Apocalypse
- Argos
- Ars Nova
- Cthulhu Rise
- Daimonji
- Christian Décamps
- Eider Stellaire
- Flor de Loto
- Focus
- Gerard
- Glass
- Gong
- Happy the Man
- Jack Dupon
- Kaipa
- Kotebel
- Landberk
- Lazuli
- Little Tragedies
- Magma
- Midas
- Minimum Vital
- Motoi Sakuraba
- Mystery
- Nathan Mahl
- Nemrud
- Neuschwanstein
- Procol Harum
- Pulsar
- Quidam
- Ritual
- Sebastian Hardie
- Sebkha-Chott
- Shades of Dawn
- Shub-Niggurath
- Survival
- Soft Machine
- Solar Project
- Témpano
- Terpandre
- Rick Wakeman
- Weidorje
- Zao
- XII Alfonso
- Yesterdays
