= Midas (Japanese band) =

Japanese progressive rock band

MIDAS
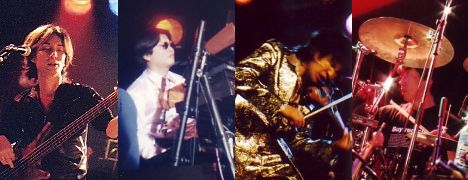

Background information
- Origin: Osaka, Japan
- Genres: Progressive rock; symphonic rock; art rock
- Years active: 1983 – present
- Labels: Made in Japan Record; MARQUEE）BellAntique; King Records; POSEIDON; Musea Records
- Members: Eigo Utoh; Eisho Lynn; Izumi Takeda; Masaru Henmi
- Website: www.hcn.zaq.ne.jp/midas/

Midas are a Japanese progressive rock band which was formed in Osaka in 1983.

== History ==
Their debut album Beyond The Clear Air was released in 1988 and was well received abroad. In 2009, they released the album 25th Anniversary Concert & Early Rare Tracks, which was accompanied by a re-release of their first album, to celebrate their 25th anniversary.

== Members ==
- Eigo Utoh – violin, guitar, vocals
- Eisho Lynn – keyboards
- Izumi Takeda – bass, pedal synthesizer, vocal
- Masaru Henmi – drums, percussion

== Discography ==
- Beyond the Clear Air (1988)
- Midas II (1996, MARQUEE Bell Antique)
- Third Operation (1999, MARQUEE Bell Antique)
- international popular album (2000, King Records)
- In Concert (2002, MARQUEE Bell Antique)
- 25th Anniversary Concert & Early Rare Tracks (2009, Musea Records)
- Beyond the Clear Air (2009 re-release, Musea Records)
- Touch the Clear Air (2013, MARQUEE Bell Antique)
- Eternal Voyage (2017, MARQUEE Bell Antique)
