= Call of Cthulhu =

Call of Cthulhu may refer to:

- "The Call of Cthulhu", the original 1928 short story by H. P. Lovecraft

== Film ==
- The Call of Cthulhu (film), a 2005 silent film, distributed by the H. P. Lovecraft Historical Society
- Call Girl of Cthulhu, an indie horror film by Chris LaMartina

== Gaming ==
- Call of Cthulhu (role-playing game), published by Chaosium (first edition, 1981)
- Call of Cthulhu: Shadow of the Comet, a 1993 adventure game
- Call of Cthulhu: The Card Game (2008), published by Fantasy Flight Games
- Call of Cthulhu: Dark Corners of the Earth, a 2005 first-person survival horror video game
- Call of Cthulhu: The Wasted Land, a 2012 tactical RPG video game
- Call of Cthulhu (video game), a 2018 survival horror role-playing video game

== Other uses ==
- "The Call of Ktulu", a track on the 1984 Metallica album Ride the Lightning

== See also ==
- The Call of Cthulhu and Other Weird Stories, an anthology of works by H. P. Lovecraft
- "The Collect Call of Cathulhu", an episode of The Real Ghostbusters (1987)
