= Flor de Loto =

Peruvian progressive folk rock band

- Origin: Lima, Lima, Peru
- Genres: Progressive rock, progressive metal, folk rock, folk metal, Andean music
- Years active: 1998–present
- Labels: Azafrán Media
- Members: Alonso Herrera; Lucho Sánchez; Alejandro Jarrín; Sergio "Checho" Cuadros; Diego Sánchez; Álvaro Escobar
- Past members: Daniel López Gutiérrez; Agustina González; Pierre Farfána; Ignacio Flórez; Junior Pacora; Pablo Alayza; Johnny Pérez; Gabriel Iwasaki; Iván Sotomayor; Efrain Rosas

Flor de Loto ("Lotus Flower") is a Peruvian progressive folk rock band from Lima, Lima, founded in 1998. The group is noted for blending progressive rock with elements of Andean music. They have released almost ten albums and gone through a number of line-up changes, with vocalist/guitarist Alonso Herrera and bassist Alejandro Jarrín being the sole constant members.

== History ==
The band was formed in late 1998 in Lima and performed its first show in a university campus. The project was envisioned by the group's first drummer, Efrain Rosas, who invited vocalist/guitarist Alonso Herrera (whom he met in the same university in Lima) and introduced him to bassist Alejandro Jarrín. It wouldn't be until 2003 that the band performed its first official, off-campus show, at a pub.

Their debut, self-titled and all-instrumental album came in 2005 and soon they were invited to the festivals Rio ArtRock in Brazil and Baja Prog in Mexico. The band's wind instrumentalist at the time, Johnny Pérez, insisted that they should start having songs with vocals. Their second album, Madre Tierra, came in 2007 with some non-instrumental songs, followed by Mundos Bizarros in 2009; after releasing the latter, they toured Europe. Imperio de Cristal was next. In 2009, they shared the stage with Paul Di'Anno during his tour in Peru.

In 2014, they released their album Nuevo Mesías, produced by Emiliano Obregón.

In 2015, keyboardist Daniel López Gutiérrez, guitarist Ignacio Flórez and drummer Álvaro Escobar left the band; the first in order to focus on other musical ideas; the second in order to study communication sciences in Vancouver and the last for personal reasons. In March of that year, they were the opening act for Finnish power metal band Sonata Arctica in the Peruvian leg of their Pariah's Child tour.

In November 2015, they released a live DVD titled Medusa – En Vivo en Buenos Aires with their performance at Sala Alcatraz, in Buenos Aires, Argentina, which took place in November 2014. By then, they were planning their next studio album, Árbol de la Vida, to be recorded in January 2016 in Buenos Aires and released later in August. The album was released with the track "Regression", featuring Italian singer Fabio Lione (Angra, ex-Labyrinth, ex-Vision Divine, ex-Rhapsody of Fire). Lione would later guest sing with them in two shows in Peru in 2023, performing a cover of "Oceano" (which in turn is a cover of Josh Groban), originally by Turilli / Lione Rhapsody.

After releasing the album in August 2016 via the Mexican label Azafrán Media, they performed at Rock and Heavy 2 in December, alongside Joe Lynn Turner, Skull Fist, Krisiun, Edu Falaschi, Mike Vescera, Mean Street and Fornix.

In June 2017, they were invited to perform at the 2018 edition of the Rites of Spring festival in the United States in May, their first performance in North America. In August, they opened for Mr. Big, alongside fellow Peruvian acts Amen and Charlie Parra.

In May 2018, shortly before heading to the festival, they released the EP Tempestad, featuring new songs and two re-recordings. Later that year, in November, they released their ninth album Eclipse, produced by Roy Z, who also performed a guitar solo in their cover of "Locomotive Breath" (originally by Jethro Tull). The album was later issued in vinyl by Polish label Oskar. In November, they opened for Saurom alongside fellow Peruvian act Rockpata.

In 2020, they released an EP titled Rumbo a la Eternidad, consisting of songs from the Nuevo Mesías sessions. Their new album was already ready by the end of 2020, but only came out in 2023. Lines of Nasca consists of English-language re-recordings of some of their songs.

In November 2021, they released a cover of "Afraid to Shoot Strangers", originally by Iron Maiden.

In July 2024, they released a song called "Robot", featuring English singer and co-writer of the song Arthur Brown. The song will be part of their new album, which at the time of the single release was expected for the second half of 2024.

== Musical style ==
The band's music has been described as progressive rock, heavy metal, progressive metal and Andean music. Most songs are written by vocalist/guitarist Alonso Herrera, with bassist Alejandro Jarrín and other members contributing a couple of songs per album.

The band's early sound was described by Herrera as having a lot of improvisations and blends resulting from their distinct influences. He also admits that the band's sound has changed "a lot" over the years and considers their fourth album Imperio de Cristal as the one which established them as a progressive folk metal act. In a 2017 interview, Jarrín admitted it is difficult to categorize the band with one genre only, but defined Flor de Loto as "fusion progressive hard rock". Herrera said he grew up listening to Iron Maiden, Black Sabbath, Deep Purple, Helloween and Celtic metal bands such as Mägo de Oz, but he didn't feel like imitating them, opting instead for trying to integrate such influences with the member's own roots.

Roy Z described them as "what would have happened if Iron Maiden met Jethro Tull in the ruins of Machu Picchu".

In a review of their album Eclipse, Rafael Valdizán of rpp.com noted how they adopted a rawer, faster and more aggressive sound while retaining the complexities of progressive rock.

Commenting on the band's lyrics, Jarrín said that as a rock/metal band, they don't really feel like speaking about cliché themes such as sex, drugs and rock 'n' roll or princesses, dragons and castles; they instead prefer to use their music to reach more people and promote their culture.

The band usually plays a cover of "El Cóndor Pasa" in the middle of their shows as a protest song against colonialism.

== Discography ==
=== EPs ===
- Tempestad (2018)

=== Studio albums ===
- Flor de Loto (2005)
- Madre Tierra (2007)
- Mundos Bizarros (2009)
- Imperio de Cristal (2011)
- Nuevo Mesías (2014)
- Árbol de la Vida (2016)
- Eclipse (2018)
- Lines of Nasca (2023)
- Cosmos (2025)

=== DVD ===
- Medusa – En Vivo en Buenos Aires (2015)

=== Singles ===
- "Regression" (2016)
- "Oceano" (2023)
- "Robot" (2024)

== Members ==
=== Current line-up ===
Sources:

- Alonso Herrera — lead vocals, guitar (1998–present)
- Lucho Sánchez — guitars
- Alejandro Jarrín — bass guitar (1998–present)
- Sergio "Checho" Cuadros — wind instruments
- Diego Sánchez — keyboards
- Álvaro Escobar — drums (?–2015;?–present)

=== Former members ===
- Daniel López Gutiérrez — keyboards (?–2015)
- Agustina González — backing vocals, occasional lead vocals
- Pierre Farfána — guitars
- Ignacio Flórez — guitar, backing vocals (?–2015)
- Junior Pacora — flute, quenas, zampoña, charango, backing vocals
- Pablo Alayza — wind instruments
- Johnny Pérez — wind instruments
- Gabriel Iwasaki — keyboards
- Iván Sotomayor — drums
- Efrain Rosas — drums (1998–?)
