= Cthulhu Rise =

Ukrainian musical group

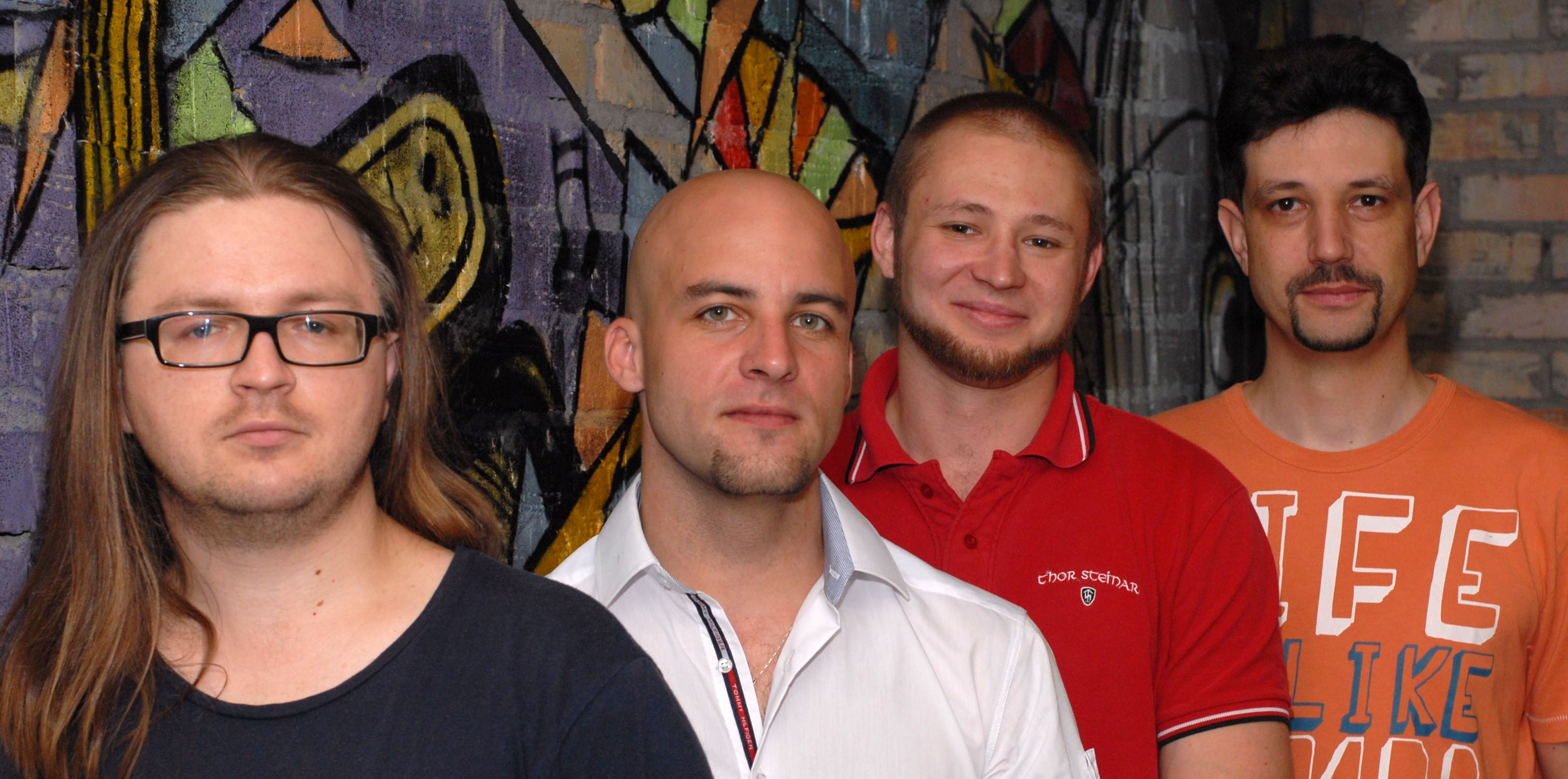

Background information
- Origin: Kyiv, Ukraine
- Genres: progressive rock, mathcore
- Years active: 2007–present
- Labels: Musea Records
- Members: Stanislav "Beaver" Bobritsky; Ivan "S_D" Serdyuk; Alexander Chub; Andy "Gone" Prischenko
- Past members: Konstantin "Kurt" Yerasov; Dmitriy "Big" Sazonov; Yury Demirskiy
- Website: http://cthulhurise.com/

Cthulhu Rise is a Ukrainian musical group based in Kyiv, making music in the areas of progressive rock and mathcore with elements of jazzcore and jazz fusion.

Opus 28 (2012)
A 30-second sample of Opus 28 track

== Band members ==
=== Current lineup ===
- Ivan "S_D" Serdyuk (guitar)
- Stanislav "Beaver" Bobritsky (keyboards)
- Alexander Chub (bass)
- Andy "Gone" Prischenko (drums)

=== Previous members ===
- Konstantin "Kurt" Yerasov (vocals, 2007-2009)R.I.P.
- Dmitriy "Big" Sazonov (vocals, 2009-2010)
- Yury Demirskiy (bass, 2007-2012)

== Discography ==
- 42 (2012)
- The Second One (2016)
- Last (2020)

=== Reviews ===
- http://avantgarde-metal.com/cthulhu-rise-42-2012/ (English)
- http://www.sonicabuse.com/2013/05/cthulhu-rise-42-album-review/ (English)
- http://kakereco.com/cd.php?id=66682 (Japanese)
- http://www.musikreviews.de/reviews/2013/Cthulhu-Rise/42/ (German)
- http://www.musikreviews.de/interviews/08-02-2013/Cthulhu-Rise/ (German)
- https://web.archive.org/web/20140113040631/http://www.iopages.nl/archief/io114.html (Dutch)
- http://www.progarchives.com/album.asp?id=52963 (English)
