= Solar Project =

German rock band

The German rock band Solar Project was founded in 1988. Their musical style is categorized best as Art rock or Progressive rock.

== History ==
Solar Project was started in 1988 by Robert Valet, Volker Janacek and Peter Terhoeven as a studio project. The debut album was published in 1990 and until 2007 further six albums followed, which are distributed by the French record label Musea. In addition Solar Project contributed to Pink Floyd tribute albums with cover versions. Since 2014 new albums and re-releases will be published by New Music - Green Tree.

== Musicians ==
- Holger vom Bruch: vocals
- Sandra Baetzel: Saxophone, Keyboards & vocals
- Florian Schlott: drums
- Sebastian Jungermann: Bass guitar
- Peter Terhoeven: Guitar
- Robert Valet: Keyboards
- Guest musicians

== Discography ==
=== Albums ===
- 1990: The final solution
- 1992: World Games
- 1995: The House of S. Phrenia
- 1997: ...in Time
- 2001: Five
- 2004: Force Majeure
- 2007: Chromagnitude
- 2007: Best of Solar Project (Vinyl)
- 2014: Aquarmada
- 2015: Here I Am
- 2015: EMP & The final solution (2CD)
- 2016: Paranoia
- 2018: Utopia
- 2020: Ghost Lights
- 2022: Restless
- 2024: Pictures at an Exhibition

=== Samplers ===
- 2000: Signs of Life - Pigs
- 2002: More Relics - Echoes
