= Novalis (band) =

German musical group

- Origin: Hamburg, Germany
- Genres: Krautrock, progressive rock
- Years active: 1971–1985
- Labels: Brain, Ahorn, Vertigo, Metronome
- Past members: Jürgen Wentzel; Heino Schünzel; Lutz Rahn; Hartwig Biereichel; Carlo Karges; Fred Mühlböck; Detlef Job; Ernst Herzner; Hinrich Schneider

Novalis was a 1970s progressive rock group formed in Germany. Their best-known albums include Sommerabend and Wer Schmetterlinge lachen hört.

== Band history ==
Vocalist Jürgen Wentzel and bassist Heino Schünzel placed a newspaper advertisement in search of bandmates in Hamburg in 1971. They were joined by organist Lutz Rahn and drummer Hartwig Biereichel. Together with guitarist Carlo Karges they formed Mosaik, soon changing the name of the band to Novalis. After the release of their first album in 1973, Wentzel left the group and Heino Schünzel took on vocal duties. Carlo Karges, who would go on to join Nena's backing band, was replaced by Detlef Job. Austrian vocalist Fred Mühlböck joined the group in 1976. 'Sommerabend' was recorded as a quartet with Rahn, Biereichel, Schunzel and the remaining new guitarist, Detlef Job.

The lyrics used on the group's first album were written in English, but on the suggestion of new producer Achim Reichel, formerly of The Rattles, they began to sing in German in 1975. The group incorporated poems by their namesake, the Romantic-era writer Novalis, among others, into their work, along with their own lyrics.

With Fred Mühlböck's powerful and unmistakable voice, the group's greatest successes and even a degree of international recognition came with the albums Brandung and Vielleicht Bist Du Ein Clown? Lutz Rahn released a 1978 solo album entitled Solo-Trip.

Proceeds from the group's 1979 concept album, Flossenengel, which was based on the theme of whaling, went to the World Wildlife Fund.

By the early 1980s, and in the wake of the Neue Deutsche Welle, Novalis appeared rather outmoded. The group sought a new direction, but split following numerous personnel changes.

Their final album was 1985's Nach Uns Die Flut. They were accompanied on tour that year by guitarist Günther Brackmann. Rahn and Biereichel put together a 1993 compilation of live recordings of Novalis at their peak.

== Discography ==
- Banished Bridge, 1973
- Novalis, 1975
- Sommerabend, 1976 (Summer evening)
- Konzerte, 1977 (Concerts)
- Brandung, 1977 (Tide)
- Vielleicht bist du ein Clown?, 1978 (Maybe you're a clown?)
- Wer Schmetterlinge lachen hört, 1978 (Who hears butterflies laughing)
- Sonnenwende, 1978 (Solstice)
- Flossenengel, 1979 (Angel with fins)
- Augenblicke, 1981 (Moments)
- Neumond, 1982 (New Moon)
- Visionen, 1982 (Visions)
- Sterntaucher, 1983 (Star diver)
- Bumerang, 1984 (Boomerang)
- Nach uns die Flut, 1985 (After us the flood)
- Novalis lebt!, 1993 (Novalis lives!, live compilation)
- Flossenengel, 1995 (compilation)
