= Chapters (Anekdoten album) =

Compilation album by Anekdoten
- Released: 11 May 2009 (CD); 27 April 2009 (digital release)
- Recorded: 1990–2009
- Genre: Progressive rock Psychedelic rock
- Label: Kscope

Anekdoten chronology
A Time of Day (2007)	Chapters (2009)	Until All the Ghosts Are Gone (2015)

Professional ratings
Review scores
Source	Rating
Allmusic	3.5/5 stars

Chapters is a double album compilation by Swedish progressive rock band Anekdoten, released in May 2009. The first disc contains the band's favourite tracks from their 3 latest albums, From Within, Gravity and A Time of Day. It also features the newly recorded track "When I Turn", a track originally written for the From Within album. The second disc focuses on the band's earlier years, including the very first Anekdoten track "Sad Rain", which previously only was available as bonus track on the Japanese version of Vemod, and demo versions of songs from Nucleus and A Time of Day.

== Track listing ==
Disc 1

1. "Ricochet" – 5:45 (from Gravity)
2. "The Great Unknown" – 6:22 (from A Time Of Day)
3. "From Within" - 7:24 (from From Within)
4. "In For A Ride" - 6:47 (from A Time Of Day)
5. "The War Is Over" - 4:38 (from Gravity)
6. "Monolith" - 6:07 (from Gravity)
7. "A Sky About To Rain" - 6:29 (from A Time Of Day)
8. "Every Step I Take" - 3:07 (from A Time Of Day)
9. "Groundbound" - 5:22 (from From Within)
10. "Gravity" - 8:22 (from Gravity)
11. "When I Turn" - 3:42 (Previously unreleased)

Disc 2

1. "Sad Rain" - 10:17 (Bonus track on the Japanese edition of Vemod)
2. "Wheel" - 7:54 (from Vemod)
3. "The Old Man & The Sea" - 7:50 (from Vemod)
4. "Nucleus" - 5:46 (Demo version from Nucleus)
5. "Book Of Hours" - 9:36 (Demo version from Nucleus)
6. "This Far From The Sky" - 9:17 (Demo version from Nucleus)
7. "30 Pieces" - 6:58 (Demo version from A Time Of Day)
8. "Prince Of The Ocean" - 5:40 (Demo version from A Time Of Day)
