= Among Gnomes and Trolls =

Swedish folklore and fairy tales annual

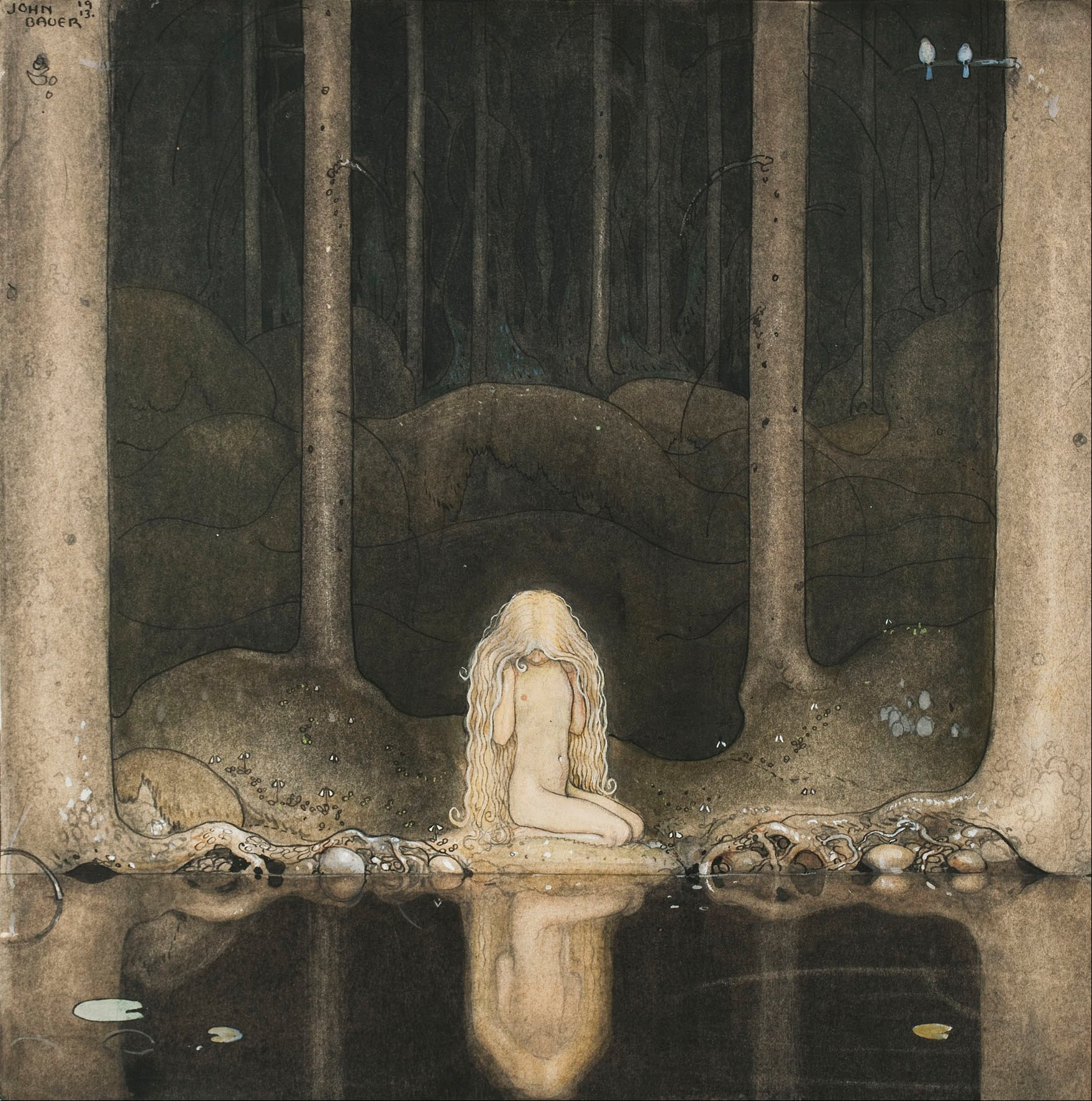
- Ännu sitter Tuvstarr kvar och ser ner i vattnet ("Still, Tuvstarr sits and gazes down into the water"), one of the most noted pictures by John Bauer from Among Gnomes and Trolls, 1913
- Author: Various
- Original title: Bland tomtar och troll
- Illustrator: Various
- Country: Sweden
- Language: Swedish

Among Gnomes and Trolls (Swedish: Bland tomtar och troll), is a popular Swedish folklore and fairy tales annual and children's fairy tale anthology published since 1907. One of the most noted of the early illustrators is artist John Bauer.

== Writers and illustrators ==
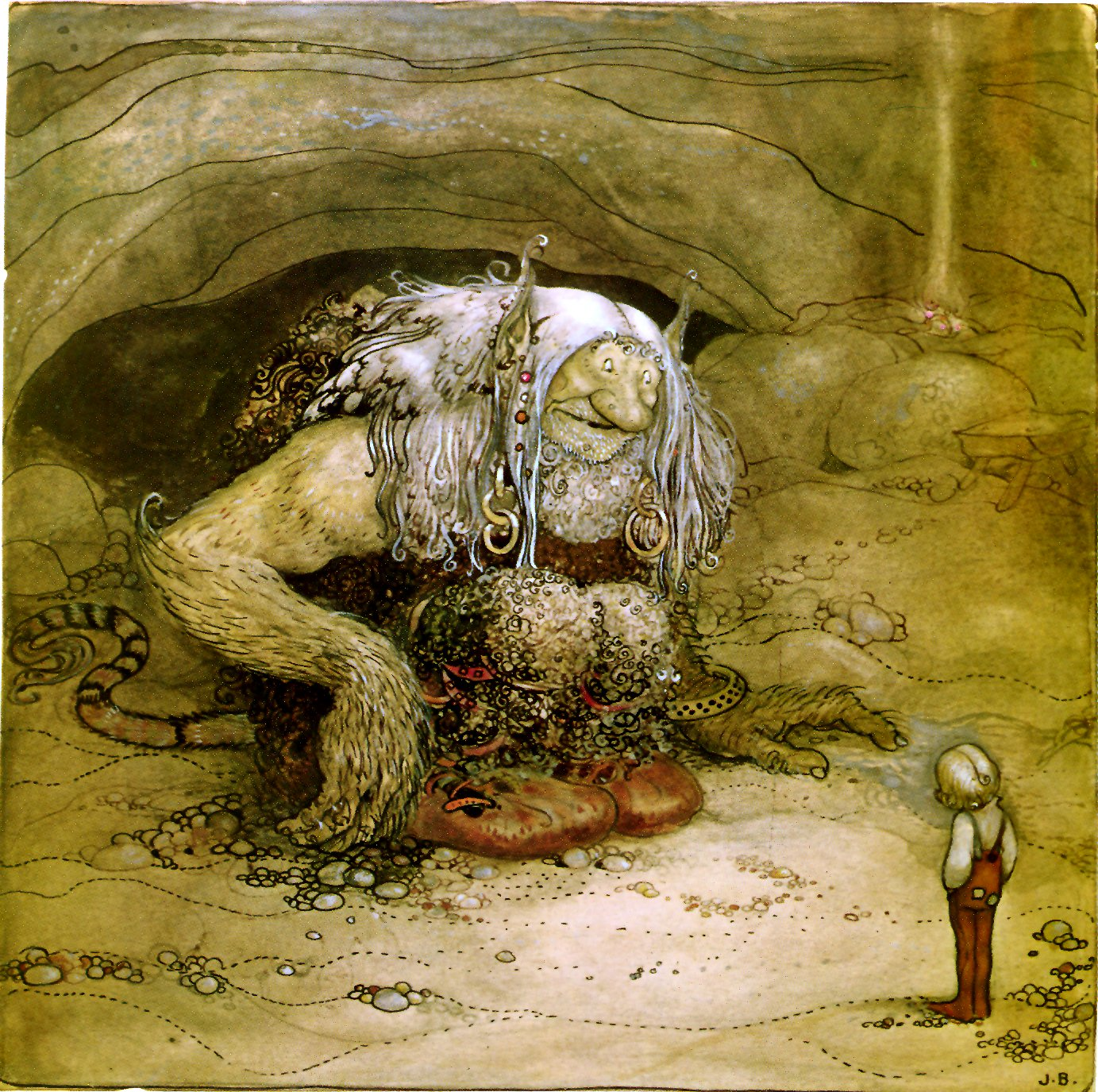
"Oh my, What a little runt! exclaimed the Troll."- The boy who was never afraid, 1912

Founded in 1907, and continuing to this very day, several of the foremost Swedish authors and illustrators have worked for the annual.

The first four volumes were illustrated by John Bauer. Volume 5 (1911) was illustrated by Norwegian illustrator Louis Moe, after which Bauer resumed illustrating from 1912 to 1915 (volumes 6-9). 1916 had no issue, but the series continues in 1917, illustrated by Gustaf Tenggren and Aina Masolle, who was the series' first woman illustrator. From 1918 to 1926 Gustaf Tenggren was the sole illustrator. Between 1927 and 1980, Einar Norelius was the chief illustrator. He was succeeded by Hans Arnold. Among the writers were authors such as Hjalmar Bergman, Helena Nyblom, Margareta Ekström, Gösta Knutsson and Edith Unnerstad.

Several books with extracts from the original volumes illustrated by John Bauer have been published. The first one was published in 1931 to raise money for a memorial honouring Bauer.

One of the most noted pictures from "Among gnomes and trolls" by John Bauer 1913 is Ännu sitter Tuvstarr kvar och ser ner i vattnet ("Still, Tuvstarr sits and gazes down into the water").

== List of tales ==
Complete list of the tales in the series, 1907–1910, 1912–1915, illustrated by John Bauer as well as the tales in the 1911 volume illustrated by Louis Moe. Years 1990-1993 and 1995 are illustrated by Hans Arnold.

=== 1907 ===
- En inledningsdikt, ("An introductory poem")

Daniel Fallström

- Sagan om Dag och Daga och flygtrollet på Skyberget, ("The story of Dag and Daga and the flying troll on Skyberget")

Harald Östenson

- Den förtrollade skogen, ("The Enchanted Forest")

Anna Wahlenberg

- Lyckoblomman på Solberga klint, ("Lucky flower on Solberga klint")

Alfred Smedberg

- Njunje Paggas äventyr, ("The Adventures of Njunje Pagga")

P.A. Lindholm

- Tomtens julafton, ("Santa's Christmas Eve")

Gurli Hertzman-Ericson

- Pojken som spände trollet för kälken, ("The boy who strapped the troll to the sled")

Harald Östenson

- Han som kunde rida i alla väder, ("He who could ride in all weathers")

Helena Nyblom

=== 1908 ===
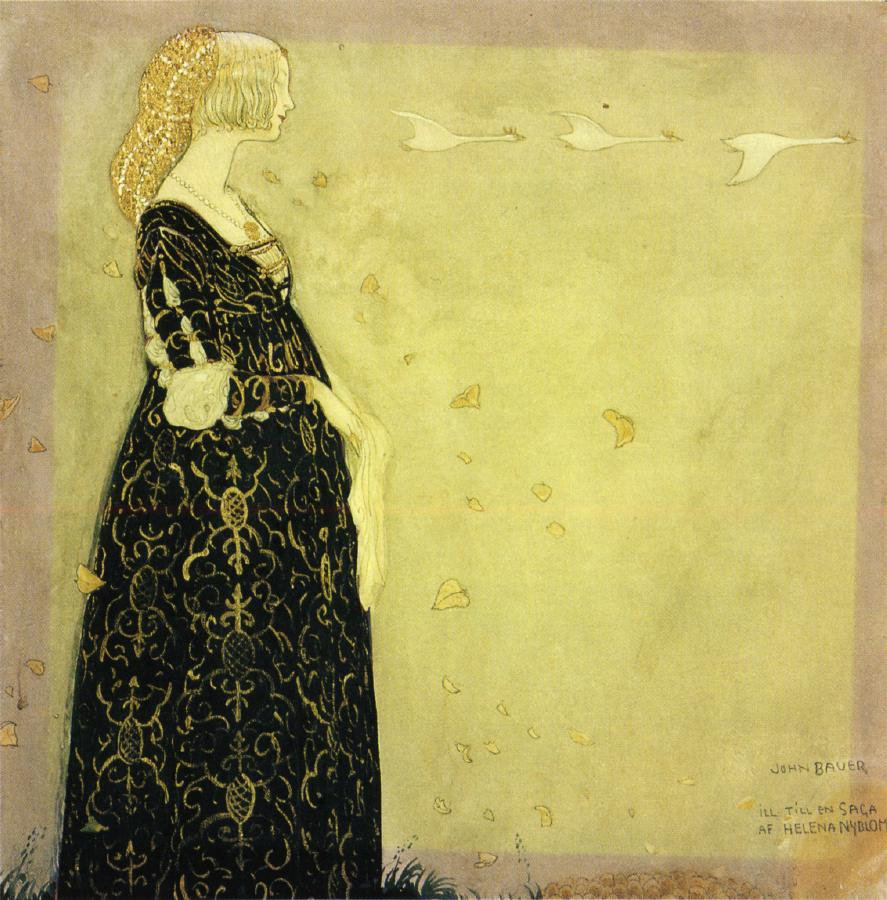
"She wandered alone for hours."–The Swan maiden, John Bauer 1908.

- Svanhamnen ("The Swan maiden"),

Helena Nyblom

- Skinnpåsen,

Anna Wahlenberg

- Konungens bägare,

Sophie Linge

- Sagan om fiskaren Sikur och trollnätet,

Cyrus Granér

- Den mäktige i det krossande berget,

Harald Östenson

=== 1909 ===
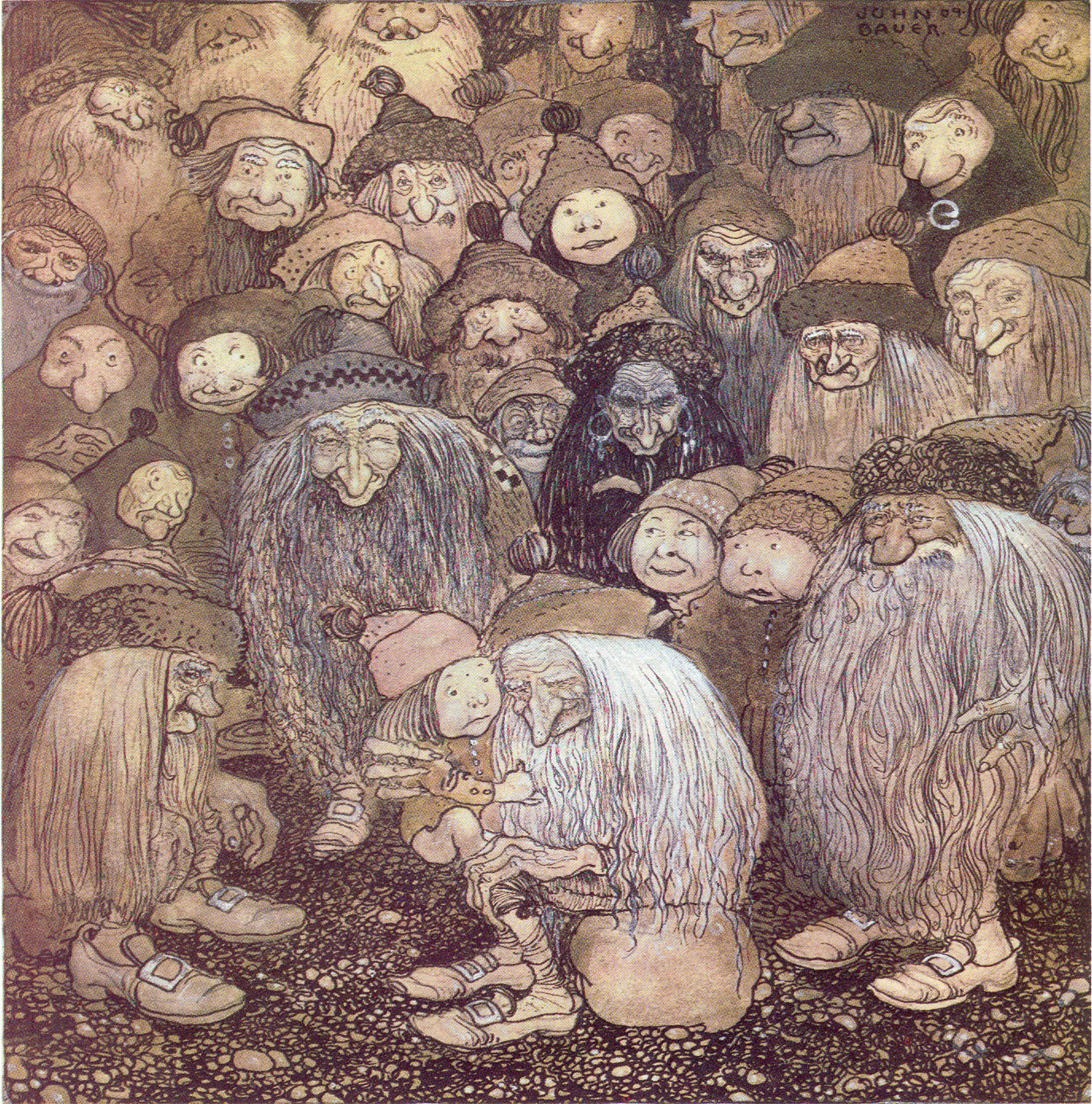
"Tjovik crept up onto the old troll's lap and stroked his beard."–The trolls and the gnome boy, John Bauer 1909.

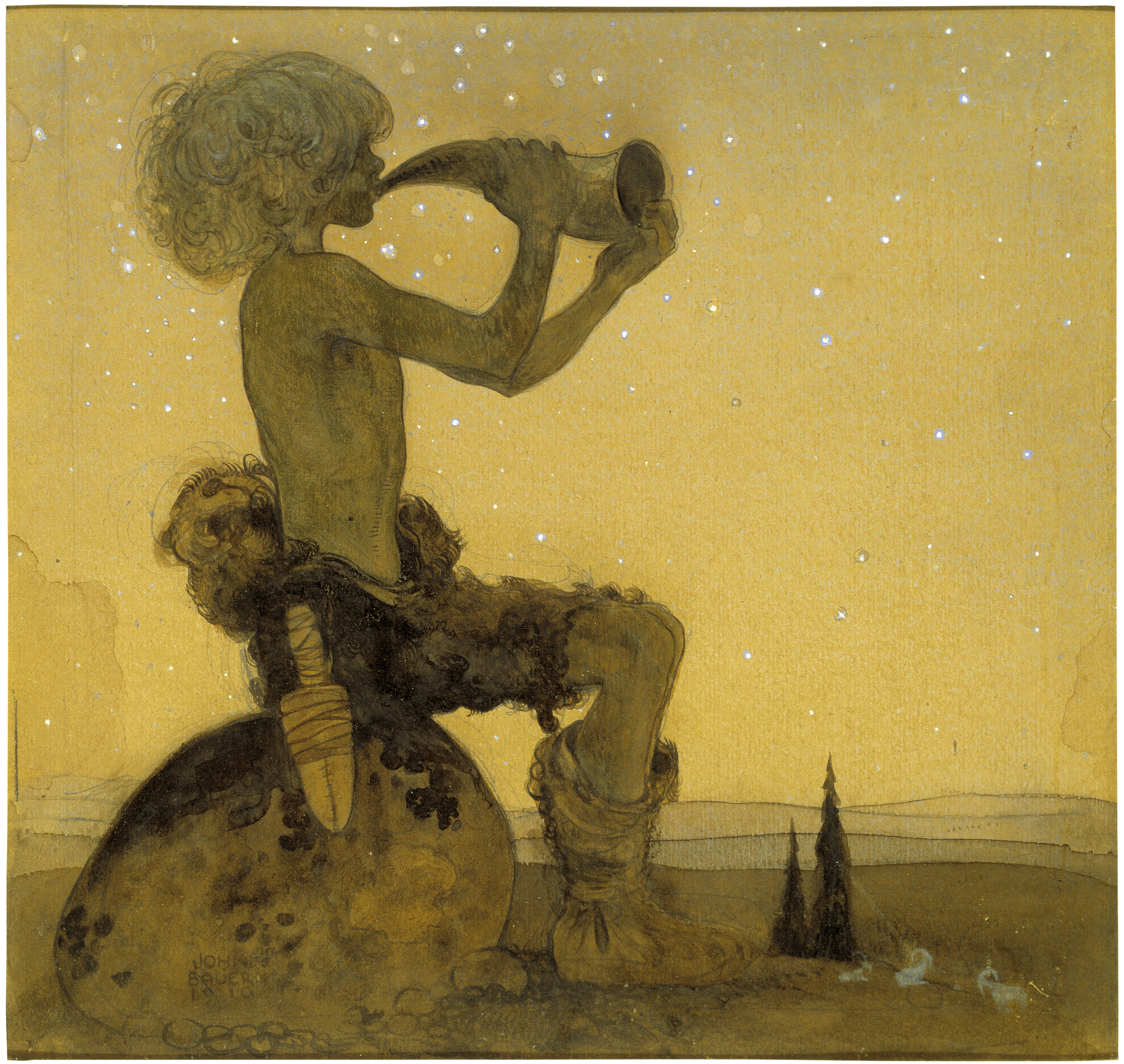
Vill Vallareman (a Fairy Shepherd).

- Herr Birre och trollen,

Vilhälm Nordin

- Sagan om de fyra stortrollen och lille Vill-Vallareman, ("The story of the four big trolls and little Vill-Vallareman")

Cyrus Granér

- Trollen och tomtepojken ("The trolls and the gnome boy"),

Alfred Smedberg

- Tomtarna,

Anna Wahlenberg

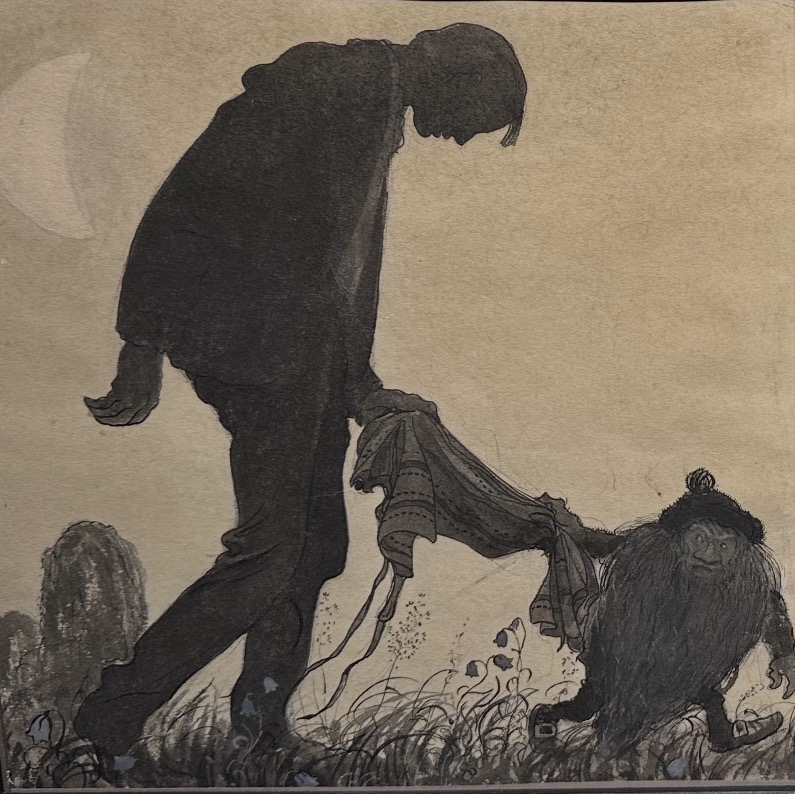
He led him over roads and paths, over mountains and hills. And all the while he slept

- Skogsväktarne,

Jeanna Oterdahl

=== 1910 ===
- Agneta och sjökungen,

Helena Nyblom

- Prinsen utan skugga,

Jeanna Oterdahl

- Svartjätten och den heliga ljusastaken,

Ester Edquist

- Pojken som gick till vindarnas håla,

Alfred Smedberg

- Trollritten,

av Anna Wahlenberg

- Pojken och tomtemössan,

Vilhälm Nordin

=== 1911 ===
- Den Fiffige tomten vid Alleberg,

Alfred Smedberg

- Trasnidaren,

Jeanna Otterdahl

- Brummel-Bas i Berget,

Gurli Hertzman-Ericson

- Molnbrollopet,

Vilhalm Nordin

- Skönheten och odjuret,

Helena Nyblom

=== 1912 ===
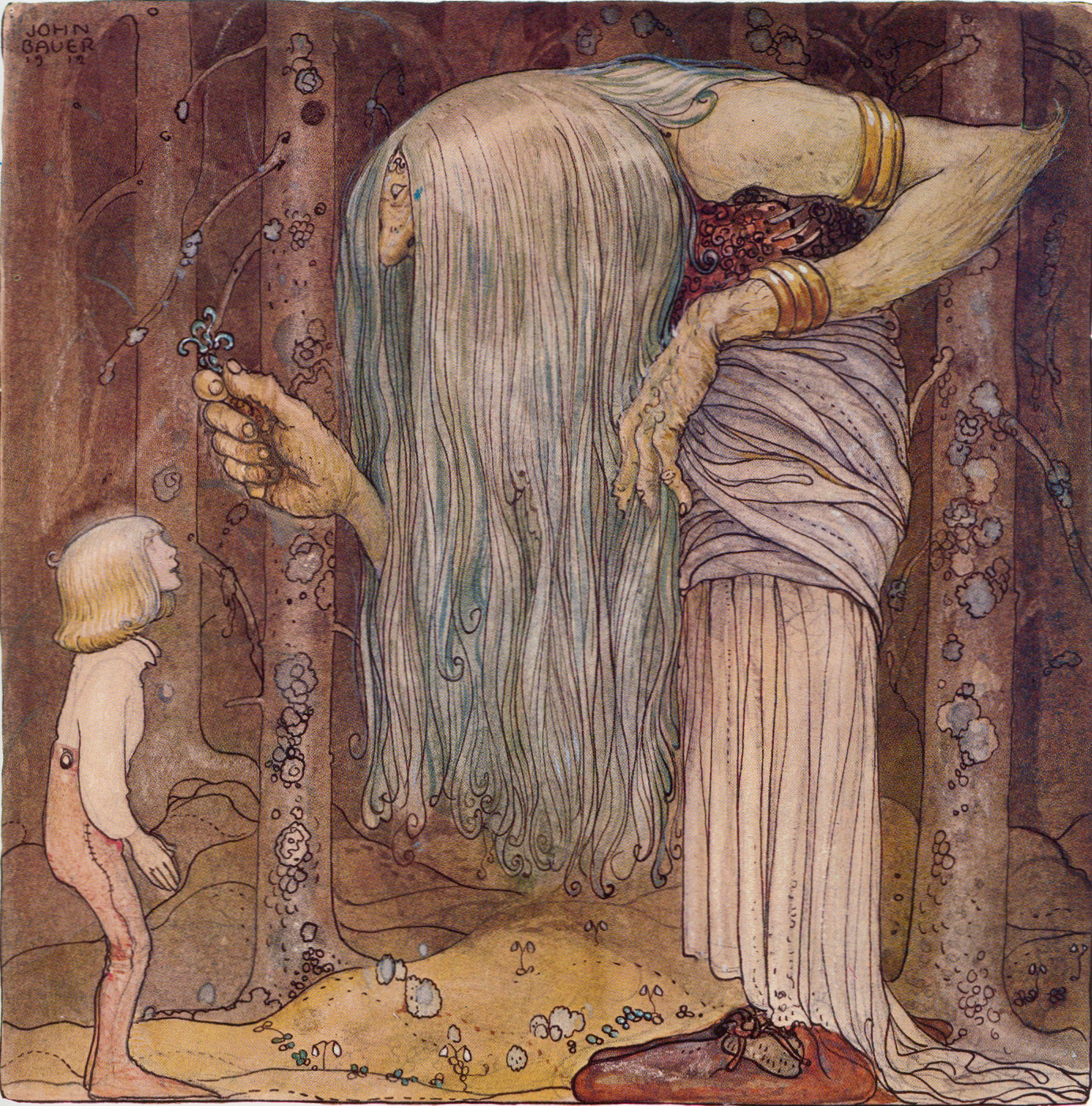
"Here is a piece of magic herb for you. Something only I can find."–The boy who was never afraid, John Bauer 1912.

- Oskuldens vandring,

Helena Nyblom

- Trollkarlens kappa,

Anna Wahlenberg

- Trollsonen som hade solögon och vart skogsman,

Vilhälm Nordin

- Vingas krans,

Ellen Lundberg-Nyblom

- Pojken som aldrig var rädd ("The boy who was never afraid"),

Alfred Smedberg

=== 1913 ===
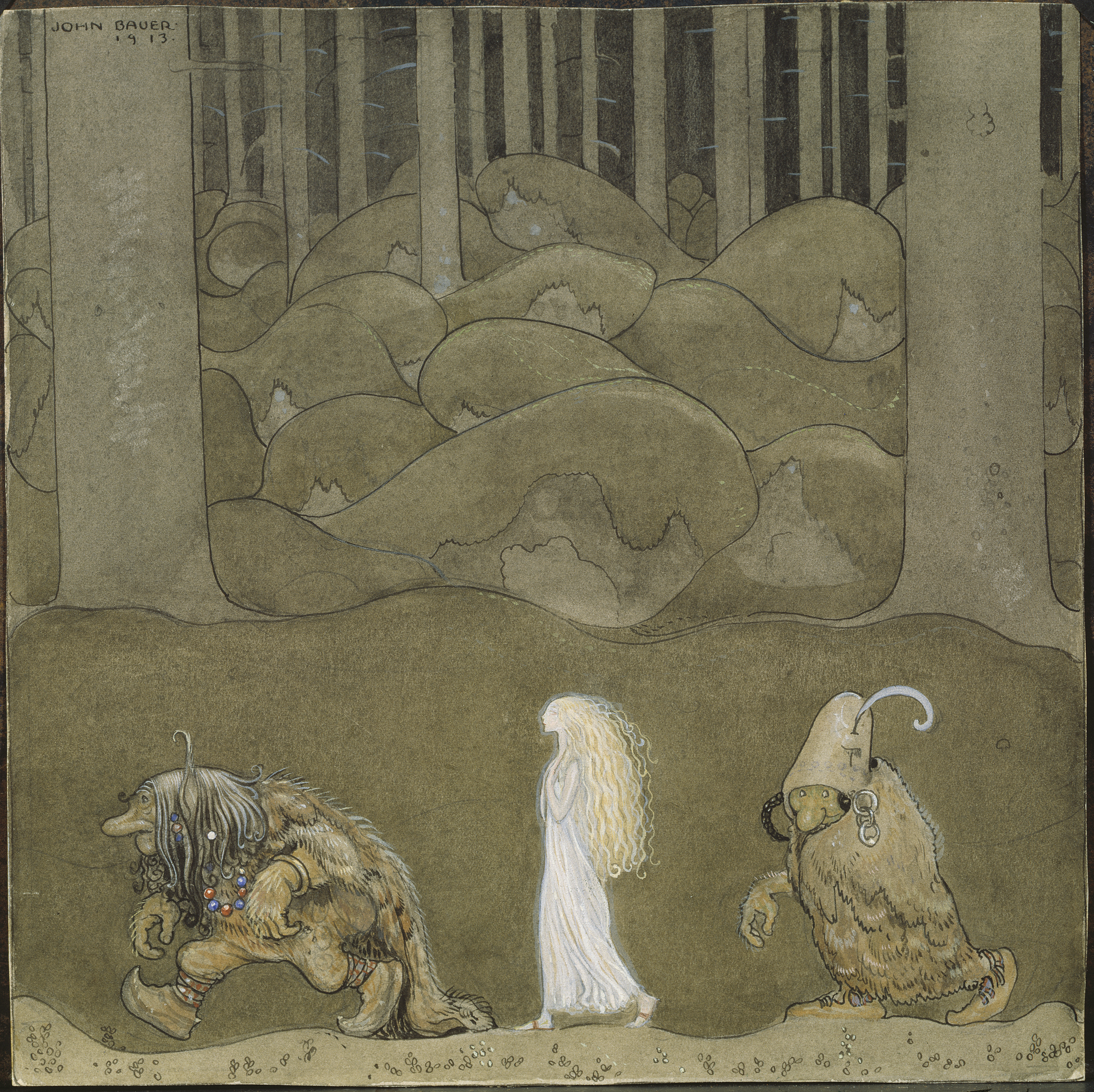
"One evening around midsummer, they went with Bianca Maria deep into the forest."–The Changeling, John Bauer 1913.

- Broder Martin, ("Brother Martin")

Emil Eliason

- Bortbytingarna ("The Changeling"),

Helena Nyblom

- Sagan om äldtjuren Skutt och lilla prinsessan Tuvstarr, ("The story of the old bull Skutt and the little princess Tuvstarr")

Helge Kjellin

- Kvastarnas kvast, alla kvastars kung,

Vilhälm Nordin

=== 1914 ===
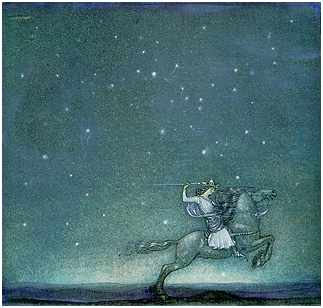
"Once upon a time a prince was out riding in the moonlight."–The ring, John Bauer 1914.

- Ringen ("The ring"),

Helena Nyblom

- När trollmor skötte kungens storbyk ("When Mother Troll did the laundry for the king"),

Elsa Beskow, illustrated by John Bauer

- Drottningens halsband ("The queens necklace"),

Anna Wahlenberg

- Fågel Fenix vingpenna,

Jeanna Oterdahl

=== 1915 ===
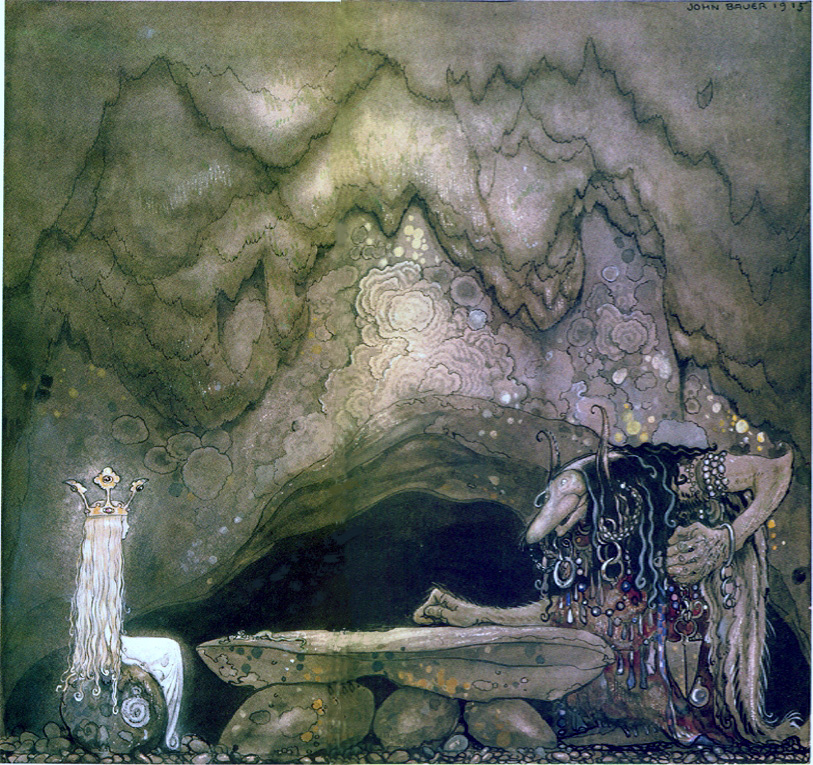
"Well, how is your appetite? mother Troll continued."–The boy and the troll or The Adventure, John Bauer 1915.

- En riddare red fram,

Jeanna Oterdahl

- Pojken och trollen eller Äventyret ("The boy and the trolls or The Adventure"),

Walter Stenström

- Spelmannen som fick madonnans guldsko,

Emil Linders

- Guldnycklarna, ("The golden keys")

W.E. Björk

=== 1990 ===
- Eldvimpeln

Irmelin Sandman Lilius

- Flickan i kristallyktan

Hjalmar Bergman

- En underlig julafton

Marie Hermanson

- Magister Tobiasson köper djupfryst

Britt G. Hallqvist

- På gäddans befallning

Folk tale

- Den nyfikna trollungen

Signe Björnberg

- Lasse och Masse

Hugo Hamilton

- Jösse och Mickel räv

Hugo Hamilton

- Vad det är skönt

Hugo Hamilton

- En natt på Irland

Margareta Ekström

- Sagan om den riktiga prinsessan

Axel Wallengren

=== 1991 ===
- Akmea och Tomas Ljuslock

Marie Hermanson

- Ängslyckan

Irmelin Sandman Lilius

- Kabadaluk

Folk tale, translated by Ingegärd Martinell

- Hunden som älskade alla

Margareta Ekström

- Pojken och spöket

Britt G. Hallqvist

- Linafina och Tovalill

Edith Unnerstad

=== 1992 ===
- De tre gyllene hårstråna

Folk tale, translated by Ingegärd Martinell

- Elin och älvorna

Marie Hermansson

- Trollet som ville se solen

Erik Palm

- Schakalen och krokodilen

Folk tale from South India, translated by Britt G. Hallqvist

- Gedda, Emanuel och Flygande Svan

Irmelin Sandman Lilius

- Prick och Prickenick

Einar Norelius

- Det förhäxade slottet

Folk tale

=== 1993 ===
- Till och från Kii-Lii

Irmelin Sandman Lilius

- Kråkungarnas visa

Viktor Rydberg

- Gubben Mintos äventyr

Folk tale

- Snårström

Britt G. Hallqvist

- Den mystiska ringen

Marie Hermanson

- Tiddelipom

Translation by Brita av Geijerstam

- De förtrollade prinsessorna

Folk tale

- Tomteluvan

Severin Schöler

- Den lilla snöflickan

Folk tale

- Skvallerbyttan

Bengt Anderberg

- Rim och ramsor

Hugo Hamilton

=== 1995 ===
- Vildäppelträdet

Irmelin Sandman Lilius

- När havet sig lägger

Hugo Hamilton

- När Grånke kom tillbaka

Einar Norelius

- Eja Popeja
- Sjulådsbyrån

Anna Maria Roos

- De vita lejonen

Marie Hermanson

- Bä, bä, vita lamm

Alice Tegnér

- Farbror Fumligs gästbok

Britt G. Hallqvist

- Till pepparkakslandet

Felix Körling

- Julkorgen

Karin Stjernholm Raeder

- Vov, sa mamma - grrr, sa pappa

Gunnel Linde

- Vaggvisa

Hugo Hamilton

- Fyra små grisar

Anna Maria Roos

- Den puckelryggiga lilla hästen

Russian folk tale

=== Illustrated English Translation ===
Many of the tales, and many of the illustrations appeared in An Illustrated Treasury of Swedish Folk Tales and Fairy Tales.
