= Qoph (band) =

Swedish progressive rock band

- Origin: Stockholm, Sweden
- Genres: Progressive rock, stoner rock, psychedelic rock
- Years active: 1994–present
- Labels: Transubstans Records; Nasoni Records; Disk Union; Kaleidophone
- Members: Federico de Costa; Rustan Geschwind; Filip Norman; Patrik Persson
- Past members: Robin Kvist; Jimmy Wahlsteen; Fredrik Rönnqvist; Anders Franzén; Henric Jordan
- Website: qoph.se

Qoph is a progressive rock band from Stockholm, Sweden, present since 1994.

== Biography ==
Qoph started in the 1990s as one of the pioneers of the stoner rock scene in Sweden. Originally formed as an experimental rock act Robin Kvist joined the band adding Swedish lyrics on what was later to become Qoph's debut album Kalejdoskopiska Aktiviteter (Kaleidoscopic Activities), released in 1998. The album cover was painted by Swiss/Swedish surrealist artist Hans Arnold, who also did the cover for the 1976's ABBA album, Greatest Hits.

Drummer Federico de Costa, guitarist Filip Norman and bassist Patrik Persson were core members of several line ups before 1998. Many of the earlier songs were instrumental. In 1996 Jimmy Wahlsteen replaced original guitarist Fredrik Rönnqvist, who went on founding The Moon. Some early Qoph songs later appeared on The Moon's album In Phase (2005 Nasoni Records).

After the release of the EP Än lyser månen in 2000, Qoph started writing their songs in English. Jimmy Wahlsteen left the band in 2001.

Second album Pyrola (2004), released in Sweden, Germany and Japan, featuring several guest appearances, including Mats Öberg (Mats/Morgan Band), Joakim Svalberg (Opeth, Yngwie Malmsteen), Nicklas Barker (Anekdoten) and Dennis Berg (Abramis Brama).

Percussionist Per Wikström joined the band as a live member performing at several progressive rock festivals in Europe and USA, among them Burg Herzberg festival in Germany and Progday, USA. The band's third album Freaks, with new member Rustan Geschwind on vocals, was released by Transubstans Records and Nasoni Records in 2012.

== Members ==
- Federico de Costa – drums
- Rustan Geschwind – vocals
- Filip Norman – guitars
- Patrik Persson – bass

== Discography ==
=== Albums ===
- Kalejdoskopiska Aktiviteter CD/LP (1998 Record Heaven)
- Pyrola CD/LP (2004 Kaleidophone/Disk Union/Nasoni Records)
- Freaks CD/LP (2012 Transubstans Records/Nasoni Records)
- Glancing Madly Backwards – Rare & Unreleased 1994–2004 CD (2014 Transubstans Records)

=== Singles/EPs ===
- Aldrig Tillbaks 7' single (1998 Record Heaven)
- Än lyser månen EP (2000 Record Heaven)

=== Compilation appearances ===
- "Dansar Galet Bakåt" on Thousand Days of Yesterdays – A Tribute to Captain Beyond CD (1999 Record Heaven)
- "Rastlös" & "Restless" on Sweet F.A. CD (2002 Scana)
- "Resh" on An introduction to Nasoni Records Berlin CD (2005 Nasoni Records)

=== Related ===
- The Moon – In Phase LP (2005 Nasoni Records)
