= Symphonic Holocaust =

Studio album by Morte Macabre
- Released: October 1998
- Studio: Studio Largen (Sweden)
- Genre: Progressive rock
- Length: 57:17
- Label: Mellotronen
- Producer: Morte Macabre

Professional ratings
Review scores
Source	Rating
AllMusic	4/5 stars
MetalReviews	80/100

Symphonic Holocaust is the only studio album by Swedish four-piece progressive rock band Morte Macabre. It was released in October 1998 via Mellotronen. Recording sessions took place at Studio Largen in Sweden. Production was handled by the quartet themselves.

Composed of eight tracks, the album consists of re-makes of instrumentals taken from the soundtracks of obscure, mostly European exploitation movies with the exception of two original compositions.

Music critics and reviewers noted the band's focus on the mellotron, which was popular among progressive rock bands of the 1960s and 1970s.

In 2004, American horrorcore musician Necro sampled the band's version of "Apoteosi del Mistero" for his song "The Dispensation of Life and Death" off of The Pre-Fix for Death.

== Track listing ==
No.	Title	Writer(s)	Length
1.	"Apoteosi del Mistero"	Fabio Frizzi	4:16
2.	"Threats of Stark Reality"	Nicklas Berg; Peter Nordins; Reine Fiske; Stefan Dimle	2:59
3.	"Sequenza Ritmica E Tema"	Frizzi	7:02
4.	"Lullaby"	Krzysztof Trzciński	8:02
5.	"Quiet Drops"	Goblin	6:43
6.	"Opening Theme"	Riz Ortolani	2:50
7.	"The Photosession"	Elmer Glaskow	7:10
8.	"Symphonic Holocaust"	Berg; Nordins; Fiske; Dimle	17:51
Total length:			57:17

Notes

- Track 1 is a cover of the song of the same name composed by Fabio Frizzi for Lucio Fulci's 1980 supernatural horror film City of the Living Dead.
- Track 3 is a cover of the song of the same name composed by Fabio Frizzi for Lucio Fulci's 1981 supernatural horror film The Beyond.
- Track 4 is a cover of the song of the same name composed by Krzysztof Komeda for Roman Polanski's 1968 psychological horror film Rosemary's Baby.
- Track 5 is a cover of the song of the same name composed by Goblin for Joe D'Amato's 1979 exploitation horror film Beyond the Darkness.
- Track 6 is a cover of the song of the same name composed by Riz Ortolani for Ruggero Deodato's 1980 cannibal film Cannibal Holocaust.
- Track 7 is a cover of the song of the same name composed by Elmer Glaskow for Alan Vydra's 1983 sexploitation film Golden Girls: The Movie.

== Personnel ==
Morte Macabre

- Nicklas Berg — mellotron, Fender Rhodes electric piano, guitar, bass, theremin, sampler, producer, mixing (track 6)
- Reine Fiske — mellotron, Fender Rhodes electric piano, guitar, violin, producer
- Stefan Dimle — mellotron, Moog synthesizer, bass, producer, mixing (track 6)
- Peter Nordins — mellotron, drums, percussion, producer

Additional

- Yessica Lindkvist — voice (track 4)
- Janne Hansson — waves effects (track 7), mixing (tracks: 4, 7, 8)
- Roger Skogh — recording, mixing (tracks: 2, 3)
- Simon Nordberg — mixing (tracks: 1, 5)
- Claes Persson — mastering
- David Östlund — design
