= A Time of Day =

Studio album by Anekdoten
- Released: April 2007
- Recorded: November 2006, March 2007
- Genres: Progressive rock Psychedelic rock
- Length: 44:58
- Label: Virta
- Producer: Anekdoten

Anekdoten chronology
Walking the Dead, Live in Japan 2005 (2005)	A Time of Day (2007)	Chapters (2009)

Professional ratings
Review scores
Source	Rating
Organ	Positive link

A Time of Day is the fifth studio album by progressive rock band Anekdoten. The band produced the album itself after three years of song writing and four months of recording.

== Track listing ==
1. "The Great Unknown" (6:22)
2. "30 Pieces" (7:13)
3. "King Oblivion" (5:02)
4. "A Sky About to Rain" (6:29)
5. "Every Step I Take" (3:06)
6. "Stardust and Sand" (4:29)
7. "In for a Ride" (6:47)
8. "Prince of the Ocean" (5:30)

== Personnel ==
- Peter Nordins – drums, cymbals, percussion, vibes
- Anna Sofi Dahlberg – mellotron, organ, Moog, Rhodes, cello, piano, vocals
- Nicklas Barker – vocals, guitar, mellotron, Moog, vibes
- Jan Erik Liljeström – bass, vocals
- Gunnar Bergsten – flute
