= Anekdoten =

Swedish progressive rock band

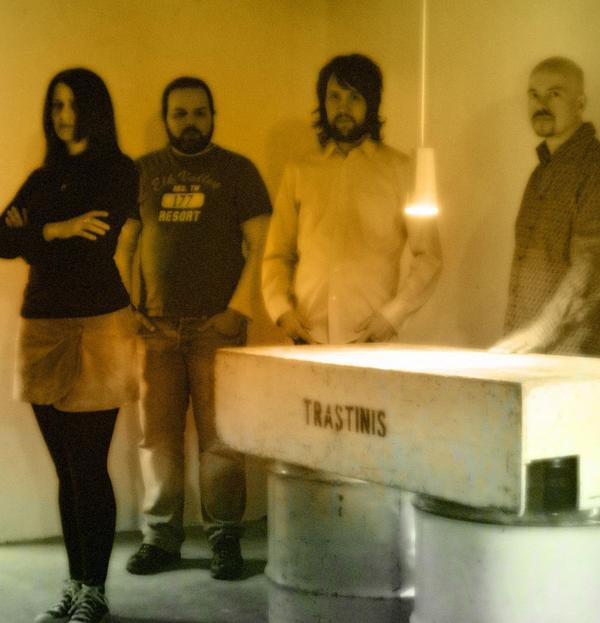

Background information
- Origin: Sweden
- Genres: Progressive rock, psychedelic rock, art rock, post-rock (early)
- Years active: 1991–present
- Members: Nicklas Barker; Jan Erik Liljeström; Anna Sofi Dahlberg; Peter Nordins; Marty Willson-Piper
- Website: Official website

Anekdoten is a Swedish progressive rock band, composed of guitarist/vocalist Nicklas Barker, cellist/keyboardist Anna Sofi Dahlberg, bassist/vocalist Jan Erik Liljeström and drummer Peter Nordins. They are notable for the use of the mellotron and their heavy sound dominated by a pounding bass guitar. Their music is associated with the tradition of 1970s progressive rock music, especially that of King Crimson. Since 2015 former The Church guitarist Marty Willson-Piper has been touring with the band.

== Discography ==
=== Studio albums ===
- Vemod (1993)
- Nucleus (1995)
- From Within (1999)
- Gravity (2003)
- A Time of Day (2007)
- Until All the Ghosts Are Gone (2015)

=== Compilations ===
- Chapters (2009)

=== Live albums ===
- Live EP (1997)
- Folkoperan, Live in Stockholm (1997)
- Official Bootleg: Live in Japan (1998)
- Waking the Dead, Live in Japan 2005 (2005)

== Morte Macabre ==
In 1998, Nicklas Barker and Peter Nordins of Anekdoten, along with Stefan Dimle (Landberk, Paatos) and Reine Fiske (Landberk, Morte Macabre, Paatos, The Guild) released the album Symphonic Holocaust. The album mostly consists of covered themes from horror movies, such as Cannibal Holocaust and Rosemary's Baby. The music is instrumental and characterised by improvisation and heavy use of mellotron and synthesizers.

== My Brother the Wind ==
Nicklas Barker has since 2010 been involved in a side project called My Brother The Wind. A debut CD of improvised psychedelic rock entitled Twilight In The Crystal Cabinet was released in May 2010.
