= Sensors (album) =

Live album by Paatos
- Released: 2007
- Recorded: Live in Karlsruhe, Germany, Paris, France, and Zoetermeer, Netherlands in November 2006.
- Genre: Progressive rock
- Label: Mellotronen Records; Arcàngelo Records

Paatos chronology
Silence of Another Kind (2006)	Sensors (2007)

Paatos is the first live album and the fifth release overall by the Swedish progressive rock band Paatos.

== Track listing ==
1. "Happiness" – 5:26
2. "Your Misery" – 5:20
3. "Gasoline" – 5:14
4. "Téa" – 6:09
5. "Hypnotique" – 7:14
6. "Absinth Minded" – 4:09
7. "Sensor" – 9:42

Bonus tracks

8. "Prologue" – 8:31*
9. "Shame" – 4:54*

== Personnel ==
Adapted from Discogs.

- Petronella Nettermalm - lead vocals
- Peter Nylander - guitars, backing vocals, mixing
- Stefan Dimle - bass
- Johan Wallén - keyboards
- Huxflux Nettermalm - drums, loops, backing vocals
- Carl Michael Herlöfsson - mastering
- Wouter "Baloo" Nagtegaal - recording of tracks 1 through 7
