= Pyrola (album) =

Studio album by Qoph
- Released: 2004
- Recorded: at UAE Studios in Stockholm, Sweden
- Genre: Progressive rock, Psychedelic rock
- Length: 52:47
- Language: English
- Label: Kaleidophone Records, Disk Union, Nasoni Records

Qoph chronology
| Kalejdoskopiska Aktiviteter (1998) | Pyrola (2004) | Freaks (2012) |

Pyrola is the second studio album by Swedish progressive rock band Qoph. The album was released in Sweden and Germany in 2004 and in Japan by Disk Union in 2005. The Japanese edition includes the bonus track "Anticipations" with Mats Öberg (Mats/Morgan Band) guesting on Moog. The double vinyl version contains two more bonustracks: "Resh" and "Will the Sun Be Back Tomorrow.

== Track listing ==
| No. | Title | Length |
|---|---|---|
| 1. | "Woodrose" | 5:19 |
| 2. | "Half of Everything" | 6:28 |
| 3. | "Korea" | 10:01 |
| 4. | "Travel Candy" | 5:40 |
| 5. | "Stand My Ground" | 6:26 |
| 6. | "Moontripper" | 4:36 |
| 7. | "Fractions" | 14:03 |

== Personnel ==
- Robin Kvist – vocals
- Filip Norman – guitar
- Federico de Costa – drums
- Patrik Persson – bass

== Guest musicians ==
- Joakim Svalberg – clavinet and Moog, (on "Stand My Ground")
- Mats Öberg – Moog and vocals, (on "Korea")
- Nicklas Barker – Mellotron, (on "Moontripper" and "Korea")
- Simon Steensland – theremin, (on "Travel Candy")
- Per Wikström – percussion
- Dennis Berg – electronic bite alarm, (on "Half of Everything")

=== Production ===
- Per Wikström – engineer
