= From Within =

From Within may refer to:

== Music ==
- From Within (album), by Anekdoten, 1999
- From Within, a 1972 expanded version of Soulful, a 1969 album by Dionne Warwick
- From Within A mid-1990s collaboration between techno musicians Richie Hawtin and Pete Namlook, also the title of three EPs they released

== TV and film ==
- From Within (film), a 2008 American horror film directed by Phedon Papamichael
- "From Within" (The Outer Limits), a television episode
