= I Am a Werewolf Cub =

1972 book written by Gunnel Linde and illustrated by Hans Arnold

- Swedish language original book cover for Jag är en varulvsunge (I am a werewolf cub)
- Author: Gunnel Linde
- Original title: Jag är en varulvsunge
- Illustrator: Hans Arnold
- Cover artist: Hans Arnold
- Language: Swedish
- Published: 1972
- Publication place: Sweden

I am a werewolf cub (Swedish: Jag är en varulvsunge) is a 1972 Swedish children's novel by Gunnel Linde illustrated by Hans Arnold. It was translated to English by Joan Tate.

== Plot introduction ==
Ulf was bitten in his leg when stealing apples. He read the Book of Werewolves and understands he turns into a werewolf at full moon. His family notices that the previously timid Ulf is now talking back and sneaks out at night.
