= Timeloss =

Studio album by Paatos
- Released: 2002
- Genre: Progressive rock Art rock
- Length: 39:29

Paatos chronology
Perception/Téa (2001)	Timeloss (2002)	Kallocain (2004)

Professional ratings
Review scores
Source	Rating
Allmusic	4/5 stars

Timeloss is the first studio album by the Swedish progressive rock band Paatos.

== Track listing ==
1. "Sensor" (5:11)
2. "Hypnotique" (8:32)
3. "Téa" (5:45)
4. "They Are Beautiful" (7:44)
5. "Quits" (12:17)
