= My Brother The Wind =

- Origin: Sweden
- Genres: Psychedelic rock, krautrock, post-rock (early)
- Years active: 2009–present
- Members: Nicklas Barker; Mathias Danielsson; Ronny Eriksson; Tomas Erikson

My Brother The Wind is an improvisation collective consisting of Anekdoten's Nicklas Barker, Makajodama’s Mathias Danielsson, and Magnolia's Ronny Eriksson & Tomas Eriksson. They have recorded two albums of totally improvised psychedelic rock. They are associated with Swedish underground bands such as Träd, Gräs & Stenar & Dungen. Both albums have entered the Swedish charts, which is rare for improvised music.

== Discography ==
=== Studio albums ===
- Twilight in the Crystal Cabinet (2010)
- I Wash My Soul in the Stream Of Infinity (2011)
- Once There Was a Time When Time and Space Were One (2014)

=== Live albums ===
- Live at Roadburn 2013 (2014)
