= Skräcknatten i Fasenbo =

1985 Swedish children's book by Gunnel Linde

- Author: Gunnel Linde
- Illustrator: Tord Nygren
- Language: Swedish
- Genre: children, horror
- Published: 1985
- Publisher: AWE/Geber/Almqvist & Wiksell läromedel
- Publication place: Sweden

Skräcknatten i Fasenbo is a 1985 children's book by Gunnel Linde.

== Plot summary ==
Lunsan tells Petter and Anders she is afraid of the dark. When Petter and Anders boast that they are not, she challenges them and gives them a mission: to sleep overnight inside a deserted and supposedly haunted house outside the village where they live.

Neither of them knows that the other is also there, and they both spend a disturbed night hearing strange noises. It is not until the next day that they learn they have in fact frightened each other.
