= Freaks (Qoph album) =

Studio album by Qoph
- Released: 2012
- Recorded: in Stockholm, Sweden
- Genre: Progressive rock, psychedelic rock
- Length: 43:25
- Language: English
- Label: Transubstans Records, Nasoni Records

Qoph chronology
Pyrola (2004)	Freaks (2012)	Glancing Madly Backwards (2014)

Freaks is the third studio album by Swedish progressive rock band Qoph, released in 2012.

== Track listing ==
No.	Title	Length
1.	"Hearts & Sorrows"	5:28
2.	"Seconds & Minutes"	3:02
3.	"In Your Face"	4:56
4.	"Ride"	3:37
5.	"Feverland"	4:35
6.	"The Weirdness to Come"	5:13
7.	"Freaks"	4:36
8.	"Remedy"	4:44
9.	"The Devil Rides Out"	7:11

== Personnel ==
- Rustan Geschwind – vocals
- Filip Norman – guitar
- Federico de Costa – drums
- Patrik Persson – bass

== Guest musicians ==
- Karl Asp – saxophone, (on "Ride" and "The Devil Rides Out")

=== Production ===
Mastered by Magnus Bergman.
