= Silence of Another Kind =

Studio album by Paatos
- Released: 2006
- Genre: Progressive rock
- Length: 42:03
- Label: InsideOut Records

Paatos chronology
Kallocain (2004)	Silence of Another Kind (2006)	Sensors (2007)

Professional ratings
Review scores
Source	Rating
Allmusic	link

Silence of Another Kind is the third studio album by the band Paatos.

== Track listing ==
1. "Shame" - (4:32)
2. "Your Misery" - (5:06)
3. "Falling" - (5:10)
4. "Still Standing" - (6:10)
5. "Is That All?" - (6:49)
6. "Procession of Fools" - (0:34)
7. "There Will Be No Miracles" - (3:36)
8. "Not a Sound" - (7:25)
9. "Silence of Another Kind" - (2:41)
