= Paatos =

Swedish progressive rock band

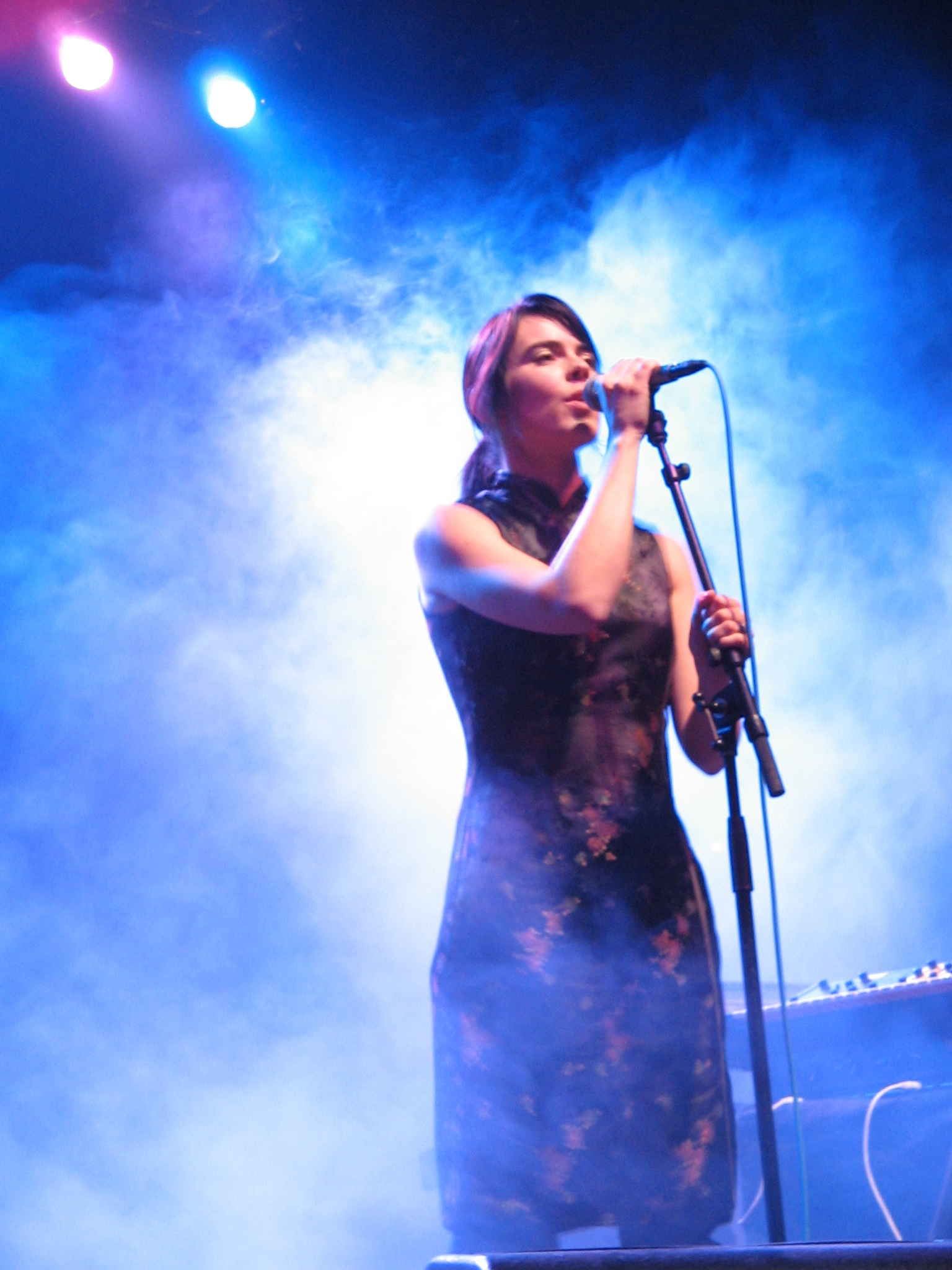

Background information
- Origin: Stockholm, Sweden
- Genre: Progressive rock
- Years active: 2000–present
- Labels: InsideOut Music, Glassville Records
- Members: Petronella Nettermalm; Peter Nylander; Huxflux Nettermalm; Ulf Ivarsson; Mikael Nilzén
- Past members: Reine Fiske; Stefan Dimle; Johan Wallén
- Website: http://www.paatos.com/

Paatos is a Swedish rock band that was formed in 1999 by Reine Fiske and Stefan Dimle (both previous members of Landberk), Petronella Nettermalm, Ricard Nettermalm and Johan Wallen. Paatos is usually classified as progressive rock, albeit influenced by bands such as Portishead and Massive Attack.

== History ==
Paatos was formed in 1999 by Reine Fiske and Stefan Dimle of the Swedish band Landberk, and Ricard "Huxflux" Nettermalm and Johan Wallen of the band Agg. The band appeared at a folk rock festival with Turid Lindqvist and later recruited vocalist Petronella Nettermalm, Ricard's wife.

The band recorded their first single Perception/Tea in early 2001, and quickly assembled material for their full-length debut, Timeloss, released in 2002. The same year, the band composed and performed music for the soundtrack of the film Nosferatu.

Reine Fiske was replaced by Peter Nylander on guitar in 2003. During this time, the band was noticed by British band Porcupine Tree and played a couple of concerts in Sweden as their opening act. Steven Wilson went on to mix Paatos' next studio album, Kallocain, released in the summer of 2004.

After the release of third album Silence of Another Kind, the band again provided the support for Porcupine Tree on the successful European Deadwing tour of 2006. Recordings of that tour appeared as the live album Sensors.

During a lengthy break from band activities, it was announced in April 2009 that Stefan Dimle and Johan Wallén had left Paatos. In December of the same year, it was announced that the band has a new member, bassist Ulf "Rockis" Ivarsson.

The band released Breathing in February 2011. Later that year they went on a European tour supporting Riverside.

V, released in 2012, marked the final studio sessions of the band until 2024, when the release of new songs was announced.

Paatos' first album in 13 years, Ligament, was released in April 2025. It features 10 songs, including "Beyond The Forest" with Mikael Åkerfeldt as a guest singer.

== Discography ==
- Perception/Tea (EP, 2001)
- Timeloss (full-length, 2002)
- Kallocain (full-length, 2004)
- Silence of Another Kind (full-length, 2006)
- Sensors (live album, 2008)
- Breathing (full-length, 2011, on Glassville Records)
- V (full-length, 2012, four new songs and four re-workings of old material).
- Ligament (full-length, 2025)
