= Nucleus (Anekdoten album) =

Studio album by Anekdoten
- Released: 11 December 1995
- Recorded: July–November 1995
- Genre: Progressive rock, psychedelic rock, progressive metal
- Label: Virtalevy
- Producer: Tommy Andersson, Anekdoten

Anekdoten chronology
Vemod (1993)	Nucleus (1995)	From Within (1999)

Professional ratings
Review scores
Source	Rating
Allmusic	4.5/5 stars

Nucleus is the second full-length studio album by Swedish progressive rock band Anekdoten. The album was released in 1995.

== Track listing ==
1. "Nucleus" – 5:09
2. "Harvest" – 6:50
3. "Book of Hours" – 9:57 a) Pendulum Swing / b) The Book
4. "Raft/Rubankh" – 4:06
5. "Here" – 7:24
6. "This Far from the Sky" – 8:37
7. "In Freedom" – 6:24
8. "Luna Surface" – 8:56 (bonus track on the 2004 reissue)

== Personnel ==
- Nicklas Berg - guitar, Fender Rhodes, clavinet, pump organ, Mellotron, vocals.
- Anna Sofi Dahlberg - cello, Mellotron, vocals.
- Jan Erik Liljeström - bass guitar, vocals.
- Peter Nordins - percussion.

=== Additional musicians ===
- Helena Källander – violin.
- Tommy Andersson – Fender Rhodes on track 2, co-producer.
