= Kallocain (album) =

Studio album by Paatos
- Released: 2004
- Genre: Art rock
- Length: 51:36
- Label: InsideOut Music

Paatos chronology
Timeloss (2002)	Kallocain (2004)	Silence of Another Kind (2006)

Professional ratings
Review scores
Source	Rating
Allmusic	3.5/5 stars
Sea of Tranquility	4/5 stars

Kallocain is the second studio album of the Swedish art rock band Paatos.

== Track listing ==
=== CD Track Listing ===
1. "Gasoline" (5:55)
2. "Holding On" (5:00)
3. "Happiness" (5:20)
4. "Absinth Minded" (4:49)
5. "Look at Us" (5:25)
6. "Reality" (7:37)
7. "Stream" (5:17)
8. "Won’t Be Coming Back" (5:32)
9. "In Time" (6:34)

=== Bonus DVD Track Listing for Special Edition Only ===
1. "Won't Be Coming Back"
2. "Gasoline"
3. "Reality"
4. "Hypnotique"
