= Kalejdoskopiska Aktiviteter =

Studio album by Qoph
- Released: October 1998
- Recorded: 1997 & 1998 at BFG Studios & Six String Studios in Stockholm, Sweden
- Genre: Progressive rock, Psychedelic rock
- Length: 56:11
- Language: Swedish
- Label: Record Heaven

Qoph chronology
Kalejdoskopiska Aktiviteter (1998)	Pyrola (2004)

Kalejdoskopiska Aktiviteter (Kaleidoscopic Activities) is the first studio album by Swedish progressive rock band Qoph, released in 1998. The band recorded two versions of the album, one that was sung in English and the other in Swedish, but the English version was never released. One of the many jam sessions recorded during the studio work, the 18:31-minute long instrumental title song "Kalejdoskopiska Aktiviteter", with guesting keyboardist Joakim Svalberg (Opeth, Yngwie Malmsteen), was released as a bonus track on the double vinyl version.

== Album information ==
The album cover was painted by legendary Swiss/Swedish surrealist artist Hans Arnold, who also did the cover for the 1976's ABBA album, Greatest Hits.

== Track listing ==
No.	Title	Length
1.	"Vansinnet"	7:34
2.	"Ta farväl"	5:56
3.	"Än lyser månen (Nadir I)"	6:15
4.	"Månvarv (Nadir II)"	4:53
5.	"En Måne Som Ler (Nadir III)"	1:36
6.	"Aldrig Tillbaks"	6:20
7.	"Herr Qophs Villfarelser"	9:37
8.	"Förförande Rädsla"	13:55

== Personnel ==
- Robin Kvist – vocals
- Filip Norman – guitar
- Jimmy Wahlsteen – guitar
- Federico de Costa – drums
- Patrik Persson – bass

== Guest musicians ==
- Karl Asp – saxophone, (on "Ta Farväl", "Aldrig Tillbaks" and "Förförande Rädsla")
- Ola de Freitas – violin, (on "Vansinnet")

=== Production ===
- Bo Fredrik Gunnarsson – engineer
- Marcus von Boisman – engineer
- Petter Ingman – engineer

Mastered by Claes Persson.
