= Vemod =

1993 rock album by the Swedish band "Anekdoten"

Studio album by Anekdoten
- Released: 24 September 1993
- Recorded: March – April 1993
- Genres: Progressive rock Psychedelic rock Post-rock
- Length: 56:58
- Labels: Virtalevy (Sweden); Arcángelo (Japan)
- Producers: Anekdoten, Roger Skogh and Simon Nordberg

Anekdoten chronology
Vemod (1993)	Nucleus (1995)

Professional ratings
Review scores
Source	Rating
Allmusic	link

Vemod is the title of the first studio album released by the Swedish progressive rock band Anekdoten. According to the Trivia page of the Anektdoten website, the word "vemod" means in Swedish "(...)[tender] sadness / [pensive] melancholy."

== Track listing ==
1. "Karelia" – 7:20
2. "The Old Man & the Sea" – 7:50
3. "Where Solitude Remains" – 7:20
4. "Thoughts in Absence" – 4:10
5. "The Flow" – 6:58
6. "Longing" – 4:50
7. "Wheel" – 7:52
8. "Sad Rain" – 10:14 (Japanese bonus track)

== Personnel ==
=== Anekdoten ===
- Nicklas Berg (changed name to Nicklas Barker after marriage) - guitar, Mellotron.
- Anna Sofi Dahlberg - Mellotron, cello, vocals.
- Jan Erik Liljeström - bass guitar, vocals.
- Peter Nordins - drums, percussion.

=== Additional musicians ===
- Per Wiberg - grand piano.
- Pär Ekström - flugelhorn, cornet.

== Credits ==
- Recorded in Studio Largen, March–April 1993.
- Engineered by Roger Skogh and Simon Nordberg.
- Produced by Anekdoten, Roger Skogh and Simon Nordberg.
- Photography by Thomas Södergren and Natalie Dumanska.
- Layout and design by Teolinda.

== Release history ==
- Sept. 1993: Virtalevy, Virta 001, Sweden CD
- Jan. 1994: Colours, COSLP017, Norway LP - 1,000 copies pressed, first 250 included a color poster
- Feb. 1995: Prog Rock Music, PRM 015, Poland cassette
- Aug. 1995: Arcángelo, ARC-1001, Japan CD - first pressing (1,500 copies) was housed in a vinyl coating gatefold sleeve
- Aug. 1996: Record Heaven, RHPD2, Sweden picture disc LP
- July 1999: Rock Symphony, RSLN 012, Brazil CD
