= Glancing Madly Backwards =

Album by Qoph

Glancing Madly Backwards – Rare & Unreleased 1994–2004

Compilation album by Qoph
- Released: 2014
- Recorded: UAE Studios/Six String Studios/BFG Studios, Stockholm, Sweden
- Genre: Progressive rock, psychedelic rock
- Length: 77:51
- Language: English/Swedish
- Label: Transubstans Records

Qoph chronology
Freaks (2012)	Glancing Madly Backwards – Rare & Unreleased 1994–2004 (2014)

Glancing Madly Backwards is an album by Swedish progressive rock band Qoph. Released in May 2014, the album contains unreleased and hard-to-find tracks recorded between 1994 and 2004. Several Qoph line ups are represented on the album.

== Track listing ==
No.	Title	Length
1.	"Resh"	3:43
2.	"Metamorphosis"	8:10
3.	"Anticipations"	4:55
4.	"Will the Sun Be Back Tomorrow"	4:29
5.	"Kalejdoskopiska Aktiviteter"	18:31
6.	"Rastlös"	3:32
7.	"Herr Qophs Villfarelser (alternative version)"	5:24
8.	"Dansar Galet Bakåt"	4:28
9.	"Ögonblick"	10:24
10.	"Förförande Rädsla (demo version)"	13:31

== Personnel ==
- Robin Kvist – vocals
- Filip Norman – guitar
- Jimmy Wahlsteen – guitar
- Fredrik Rönnqvist – guitar
- Federico de Costa – drums
- Patrik Persson – bass
- Henric Jordan – bass

=== Guest musicians ===
- Karl Asp – saxophone, (on "Kalejdoskopiska Aktiviteter", "Ögonblick")
- Jens Busch – saxophone, (on "Förförande Rädsla")
- Mats Öberg – moog, (on "Anticipations")
- Nicke Almqvist – harmonica, (on "Metamorphosis")
