= Edith Unnerstad =

Swedish writer

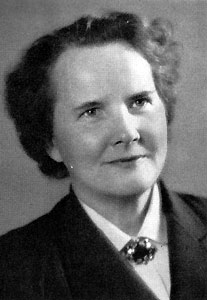
Edith Unnerstad in 1960

Edith Alice Unnerstad (née Tötterman; 28 July 1900 – 29 December 1982) was a Swedish author, particularly known for her children's books.

== Life ==
Unnerstad was born in Helsinki, Finland, the daughter of Swedes Axel and Ingeborg Tötterman. In 1908, when she was eight years old, her grandmother, a pilot's widow in Åland, died. The Tötterman family left Helsinki and moved to the grandmother's house on Åland which her mother had inherited. In 1910, the family moved to Sweden and settled in Södertälje, and in 1912 they moved to Stockholm. After the First World War the family moved back to Aland.

Writing later, she referred to an observation by the British children's writer A. A. Milne that children's writers are created early: "Perhaps Mr. Milne was right. Very likely the pattern for my future profession was already minutely drawn when I was seven or eight." Unnerstad's own literary career began when her sister was hospitalized with scarlet fever and requested something to read. Afraid that her family's much loved books would not return safely from the hospital as they would have to pass through disinfection ovens, the 11-year-old Unnerstad decided to write her sister a new book instead. She wrote new chapters daily, and delivered each to the hospital on her way to school. According to Unnerstad "The 'book', if I remember right, turned out to a horrifying mixture evidently inspired by my idols at the time: Cooper, Jules Verne, Captain Marryat and Swedish Finland's great old story-teller, Topelius.....After that there was no turning back." Three years later, she had two poems and a story published in a magazine, and spent the proceeds on a pair of patent-leather pumps, a bag of toffee and a copy of Atala by Chateaubriand. Unnerstad attended Detthowska School and art school in Stockholm. In 1924, Unnerstad married a civil engineer Arvid B. Unnerstad. They had a daughter, Lena.

== Literary career ==
Despite her early start and a continuing desire to be an author, Unnerstad's career was delayed by, in her own words "studies, art studies, public service, marriage, a baby, travels in many countries." She also did not realize that her gift was children's fiction until her own daughter was old enough to ask her mother for stories. Her first book, Ufle reser jorden runt, was published in 1932. In the following years, she wrote many works of children and adult fiction and poetry; as she herself noted, "my favorite theme has been the same: CHILDHOOD." Unnerstad later described her grandmother and mother, who were both excellent story tellers, as influential to her writing. In particular, their tales of past childhood in the past, as well as her own experiences of childhood, motherhood and grandmotherhood, influenced her stories. She continued "But above all I think the plain truth is: I was once a child, and the child I was, in many respects, I still am. That's why I know, and that's why I love to write about it." Edith Unnerstad is particularly known for a series of children's books written about the Pip-Larsson family. These include The Saucepan Journey, Little O, The Urchin and The Pip-Larssons Go Sailing, all of which were translated in English. Unnerstad's books often have a theme of cohesive families and friends.

Unnerstad explored the traditional craft of hair weaving in two of her books. From 1830 till the First World War, the Dalecarlia region of Sweden was famous for the production of ornaments and trinkets woven from hair, and women from the region travelled throughout Europe to sell their creations. The Journey with Grandmother tells the story of just such a trip to Czarist Russia, which Unnerstad researched by travelling to the Soviet Union, just after the end of Joseph Stalin's regime. Her Russian tour guide in Leningrad, with some reluctance, permitted her to visit some relevant areas. The book A Journey to England also features hairweaving: two children travel to England to find their mother who has disappeared on a hairweaving trip to the United Kingdom.

She also wrote novels for adults and radio, television, and movie scripts.

Unnerstad's books were translated into English and formed part of a wave of Scandinavian and in particular Swedish books which were influential in English-language children's literature after the Second World War. Her book The Saucepan Journey were adapted for the Swedish screen in 1950 and in 1998 in a Swedish TV series called Pip-Larsson.

She received the 1957 Nils Holgersson Plaque for her book Journey with Grandmother. Her husband died in 1971. Unnerstad died on 29 December 1982 in Djursholm.

== Awards ==
- Children's Book Prize 1949
- Nils Holgersson Plaque 1957

== Works ==
=== Children's books ===
- Uffe reser jorden runt, 1932
- Hoppentott i Vanliga skogen, 1938
- Muck, 1939
- Tummelunsarna i Vänliga skogen, 1939
- Pikku-Lotta, 1941
- Kastrullresan, 1949, reprinted 1964, translated into English as The Saucepan Journey
- Nu seglar Pip-Larssons, 1950, reprinted, 1971, translation into English published as The Pip-Larssons Go Sailing in 1963, and as The Peep-Larssons Go Sailing in 1966
- Ankhästen, 1950
- Pysen, 1952, translated into English as Pysen in 1955, and as The Urchin in 1964 and 1967
- Pip-Larssons Lilla O, 1955, translated into English as Little O, 1957
- Farmorsresan, 1956, translated into English as The Spettecake Holiday in 1958
- Kattorna fran Sommarön, 1957, translated into English as The Cats from Summer Island, 1963
- Klåfingerdagen, 1957, translated into English as Little O's Naughty Day, 1965
- Lasseman spelar, 1958, translated into English as Larry Makes Music 1967
- Bollarulla, 1958, published as Bollarulla: sju sagor från Söderåsen in 1968
- Mormorsresan, 1959, translated into English as The Journey with Grandmother and as Grandmother's Journey 1960
- Englandsresan, 1960, translated into English as "Journey to England" 1961
- Toppen och jag på torpet, 1962, translated into English as Toppen and I at the Croft 1966
- Boken om Pip-Larssons, 1962
- Vi tankte gå till skogen, 1964, translated into English as The Ditch Picnic and The Picnic 1964
- Sagor vid dammen, 1965
- Två små fnissor, 1966, translated into English as Two Little Gigglers, 1968
- Twilight Tales, translation from original Swedish manuscript, 1967
- Kasperssons far till landet, 1969
- Trollen i Tassuvaara, Ahlen & Akerlund, 1969, translated into English as A House for Spinner's Grandmother, 1970
- Klarbärskalaset, 1970, translated into English as Cherry Tree Party, 1978
- Mickie, 1971

=== Novels for adults ===
- Gården vid Rödbergsgatan, 1935
- Boken om Alarik Barck, 1936
- Susann, 1943
- Bricken, 1945
- Sara och Lejonkringla, 1946
- Snäckhuset, 1949
- Ensam hemma med Johnny, 1951
- Bockhornsgrand, 1954
- Jag älskade Clarinda, 1957

=== Poetry ===
- Leksaksekon (poetry), 1952
