= Stefan Dimle =

Swedish musician

Stefan Dimle (born 7 June 1967 in Köping, Sweden) is the bass player in the progressive band Morte Macabre and a former member of Landberk and Paatos. He is the driving force in the company Mellotronen who also is the organiser of the floating rock festival named the Melloboat which are held aboard the ship Galaxy. Mellotronen runs the community Mello-Club at a café in Stockholm.

== Career ==
During the 1980s Stefan Dimle was a member of several local rock bands in his former hometown Borlänge. One of the bands was Kajuku. Some members from that band are currently in Opeth and Anekdoten. 1986 Stefan Dimle started the rock club Mellotronen in Borlänge. The company existed on a parallel basis in Stockholm and Borlänge. The shop had a huge section of rare and hard to find CDs & LPs in the field of progressive rock. Mellotronen became an important headquarters for musicians and fans of progressive rock during the 1990s. The shop Mellotronen was located on the fashionable street Kåkbrinken in Gamla Stan in the center of Stockholm. Nowadays one can find Dimle and his company in the city of Gustavsberg.

Stefan Dimle was a member of the band Landberk between 1990 and 1997. They recorded three albums and two EPs on various record labels like Record Heaven, Mega Rock and the American label Laser's Edge. The progressive rock groups Landberk, Änglagård and Anekdoten co-operated a lot, and all three of them used the instrument Mellotron as a main instrument. These three groups led the way for many new bands in the progressive genre. All three of them were famous on an international level.

The label Mellotronen started 1991 with a CD reissue of Solid Grounds debut album from 1976. Since then has Dimle released around 50 different CD and vinyl albums. The latest ones are a double-CD with Trettioåriga Kriget and two albums with Sabu Martinez. Dimle and Mellotronen has co-operated a lot with labels like Universal, The National Swedish Radio, MNW, Sony and EMI.

Together with members from Landberk and Anekdoten, Dimle started the project Morte Macabre, who has made a career in film circuits with their repertoire of new versions of old soundtracks from mainly Italian horror movies. The band Paatos started in 1999 and Dimle performed with them til 2008. Paatos has released four albums and 7" inch vinyl single. Dimle has also performed with Emma Nordenstam, And the machine said behold, Turid and Onkel Kånkel and his kånkelbär.

In January 2007 organised Dimle a rock festival on board the ship Silja Festival to celebrate the 20th anniversary of the Mellotronen company. Among the many artists that performed on board can the following ones be mentioned, Fläsket Brinner, November, Asoka, Morte Macabre, Solid Ground and Emma Nordenstam. In March 2008 was it time for a second rock cruise on the ship Silja Symphony. Many people came to see bands like Opeth, Katatonia and Comus. In April 2009 the third rock cruise was supposed to take place with the destination Finland, this time on board the M/S Galaxy. However, a few months before the date Dimle announced that Melloboat 2009 had been cancelled. Among the many artist that was supposed to perform on the cruise was Meshuggah, May Blitz and Steven Wilson.
