= From Within (album) =

Studio album by Anekdoten
- Released: October 1999
- Recorded: August–September 1999
- Genre: Progressive rock, psychedelic rock
- Label: Virtalevy
- Producer: Simon Nordberg, Anekdoten

Anekdoten chronology
Nucleus (1995)	From Within (1999)	Gravity (2003)

Professional ratings
Review scores
Source	Rating
Allmusic	4.5/5 stars

From Within is the third full-length studio album released by Swedish progressive rock band Anekdoten. The album was released in 1999.

== Track listing ==
1. "From Within" – 7:25
2. "Kiss of Life" – 4:40
3. "Groundbound" – 5:24
4. "Hole" – 11:08
5. "Slow Fire" – 7:26
6. "Firefly" – 4:49
7. "The Sun Absolute" – 6:39
8. "For Someone" – 3:30

== Personnel ==
- Peter Nordins – percussion, vibraphone
- Nicklas Berg – guitar, mellotron, wurlitzer
- Anna Sofi Dahlberg – piano, cello, vocals, mellotron, Fender Rhodes
- Jan Erik Liljestrom – bass, vocals

and

- Simon Nordberg – piano, Hammond organ
- Janne Hansson – engineer
