= Anna Wahlenberg =

Swedish writer and playwright

Anna Maria Lovisa Wahlenberg(-Kjerrman)
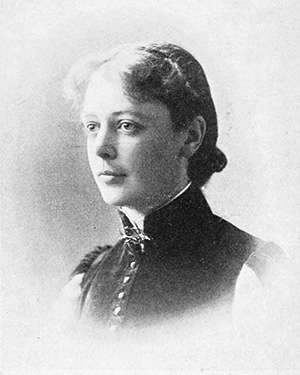
- Born: 28 May 1858; Stockholm
- Died: 29 November 1933 (aged 75); Solna
- Occupations: writer, playwright
- Spouse: Fritz Josef Kjerrman
- Writing career
- Pen name: Rien
- Genres: novels, fairy tails, plays

Anna Maria Lovisa Wahlenberg (23 May 1858 – 29 November 1933) was a Swedish writer and playwright.

== Life ==
Anna Wahlenberg was born on 23 May 1858 in Stockholm. For nine years, she lived on the old farm in Kungsholmen where her father had a candle factory. Wahlenberg attended Pauli girls’ school and the Wallin school.

In 1882, she debuted with her first collection of short stories Teckningar i sanden (Drawings in the Sand) under the pseudonym Rien (from Swedish 'nothing'). In 1886, Wahlenberg wrote her second book and a first novel Små själar (Small Souls). The novel deals with failings in women's education and promotes financial independence for women. She wrote two more collections of short stories, Hos grannas (1887) and I hvardagslag (1889), dedicated to a young woman's fight for financial independence.

In 1888, Wahlenberg married Fritz Kjerrman, editor of the newspaper Dagens Nyheter, with whom she had two sons.

In 1890, she deputed as a playwright with a comedy called På vakt followed by a prolific output of plays for amateurs and children as well as for professional actors that were frequently staged at the Kungliga Dramatiska Teatern (the Royal Dramatic Theatre) in Stockholm.

In 1895, Wahlenberg wrote her first art fairy tale collection Bengt's tales about kings, elves, trolls and princesses. She wrote over 200 fairy tales, dedicating some of them to her sons. In her fairy tales, Wahlenberg combined traditional fairy tale enchantment and magic with everyday problems and events. In 1899, she became the first to translate A Thousand and One Nights into Swedish.

Wahlenberg lived all her life in Stockholm and moved in with her sister after her husband's death in 1896.

Anna Wahlenberg died on 29 November 1933 and is buried at Norra cemetery in Solna.

== Selected works ==
- En mesallians
- Kungens nattmössa
- Länge, länge, sedan . . . Sagor
- Löndörren
- Pappas kria
- På vakt
- Sagoteatern
- Stackars flicka
- Två valspråk
