= Gunnel Linde =

Swedish writer

- Born: 14 October 1924; Stockholm, Sweden
- Died: 12 June 2014 (aged 89)
- Writing career
- Language: Swedish
- Period: 1958-1996
- Genre: children
- Notable work: Den vita stenen

Gunnel Linde (14 October 1924 – 12 June 2014) was a Swedish writer who has written over forty children's books, among them Den vita stenen and I Am a Werewolf Cub.

In 1971, she was one of the founders of BRIS ("Barnens rätt i samhället", in English Children's Rights in Society).

She has received the Swedish Nils Holgersson Plaque in 1965 (for the book Den vita stenen) and the Astrid Lindgren Prize in 1978.

== Works ==
- Skräcknatten i Fasenbo (1985)
