= Landberk =

Swedish prog/art rock band

- Origin: Sweden
- Genres: Progressive rock, progressive folk, art rock
- Years active: 1992–1999
- Labels: Record Heaven, Laser's Edge, Megarock, Musea
- Past members: Patric Helje; Reine Fiske; Stefan Dimle; Simon Nordberg; Jonas Lidholm; Andreas Dahlbäck

Landberk was a Swedish prog/art rock band, characterized by a dark, sombre tone in their music. They were notable for their utilisation of the mellotron, which was as important as the guitar in their music. Landberk's last live performance was in Oslo 1999. The band released three studio albums during the 1990s, Riktigt Äkta (1992), followed by One Man Tells Another (1994) and Indian Summer (1996). They also recorded a cover version of No More White Horses, a song by T2, an almost forgotten psychedelic rock band from the 1960s.

Members of the band were: Stefan Dimle (bass), Reine Fiske (guitars), Patric Helje (vocals), Jonas Lidholm (drums) and Simon Nordberg (mellotron/keyboard). Simon Nordberg also acted as the group's producer. On Landberk's first album Andreas Dahlbäck played drums.

In 2024, Indian Summer was re-released with a new sleeve design by the artist Camilla Flink.

== Discography ==
=== Studio albums ===
- Riktigt Äkta / Lonely Land, 1992
- One Man Tell's Another, 1994
- Indian Summer, 1996

=== Live recordings ===
- Unaffected, 1995

=== Singles and promotional recordings ===
- Jag Är Tiden, 1994
- Dream Dance, 1995
