= Nicklas Barker =

Swedish musician

Nicklas Barker, formerly Berg (born 9 July 1969), is a Swedish musician best known as the founder, guitarist, vocalist and keyboardist of the progressive rock band Anekdoten. He is also involved with other bands and projects, such as horror soundtrack band Morte Macabre and psychedelic improvisation rock band My Brother The Wind. He also wrote the original soundtrack for the Spanish movie El Ultimo Fin De Semana.
