= Karnataka (band) =

Welsh progressive rock band

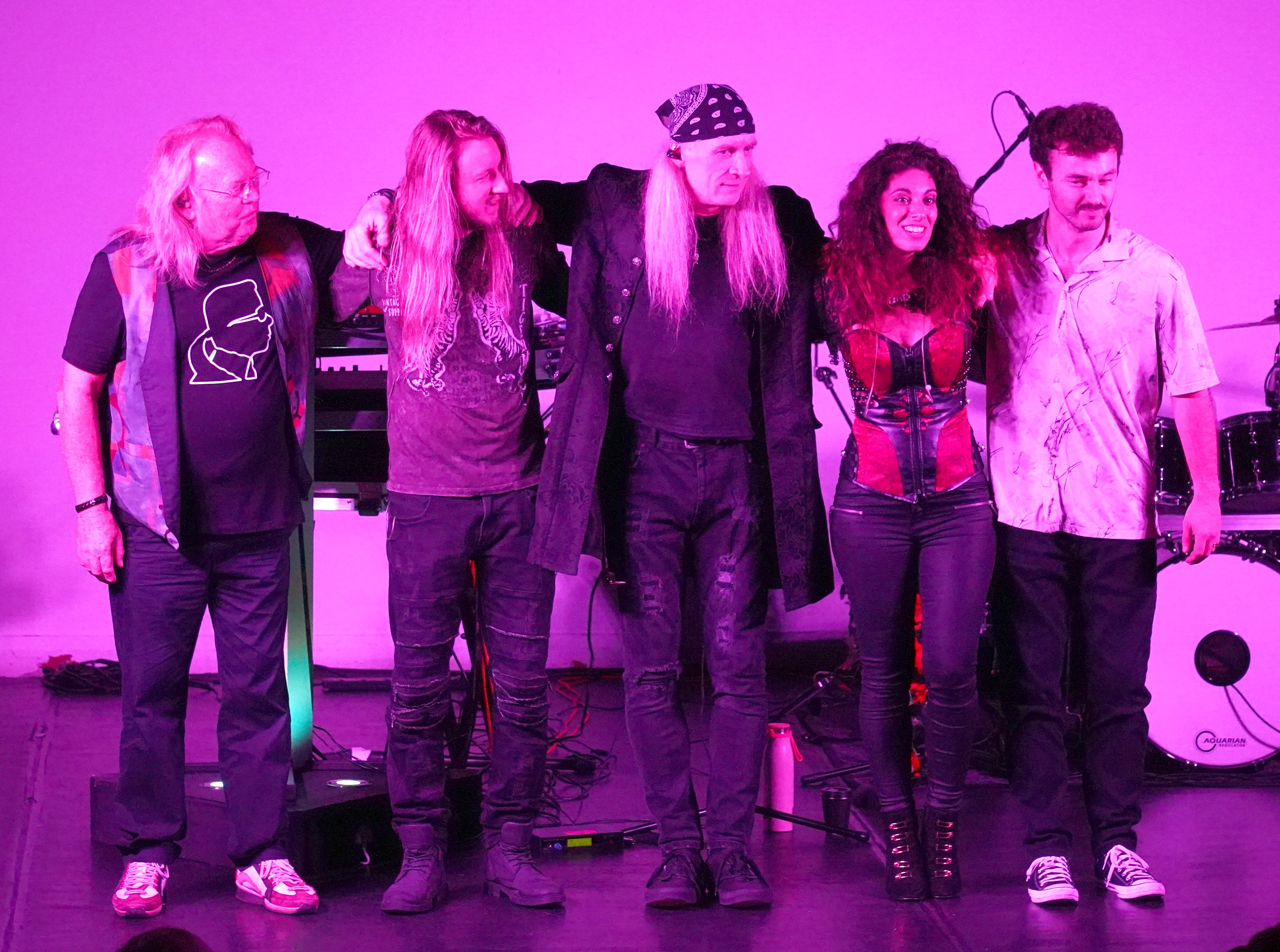
- Karnataka in 2025

Background information
- Origin: Swansea, Wales
- Genres: Progressive rock symphonic rock
- Years active: 1997–2004, 2005-present
- Label: Immrama (Independent)
- Members: Ian Jones; Luke Machin; Sertari; Rob Wilsher; Jack Summerfield
- Past members: Paul Davies; Jonathan Edwards; Gavin Griffiths; Rachel Jones; Anne-Marie Helder; Gonzalo Carrera; Bob Dalton; Nick May; Lisa Fury; Louie Palmer; Enrico Pinna; Ian Harris; Colin Mold; Hayley Griffiths; Cagri Tozluoglu; Matt McDonough; Jimmy Pallagrosi; Filippo Galli; Chris Allan
- Website: Official website

Karnataka are a Welsh progressive rock band formed by Ian Jones in 1997. He has remained the sole constant member of the band throughout different iterations. So far, the band has released six regular studio albums and three live albums. The current line-up of the band consists of Sertari (vocals), Luke Machin (guitars), Ian Jones (bass), Rob Wilsher (keyboards) and Jack Summerfield (drums).

== History ==
=== 1997–2004: original line-up ===
The band started as a project to record songs in Ian Jones' home studio, which he had written and performed with Jonathan Edwards (keyboards) and Rachel Jones (vocals). The project was augmented by additional musicians, Paul Davies (electric guitars) and Gavin Griffiths (drums), who had played with other members previously. At the end of the recording the decision was made to continue the project as a band. The name Karnataka was chosen by the band, from a suggestion by Ian, following his trips to that state of India.

The five-piece recorded what would become their self-titled debut album in late 1997 and early 1998. In the beginning, the band had no thought of actually releasing the album – they made the recording for their own pleasure. As they started to play live shows in their new configuration, however, word of mouth ensured that an increasing number of people started asking for copies. The album was released in 1998.

It was recommended to the band that they send a copy of the album to Martin Hudson at the Classic Rock Society. Martin gave the band their first break by positively reviewing the album in the society's magazine, and then offering them a gig for the Classic Rock Society in Rotherham, supporting the Genesis tribute band ReGenesis in 1999. The show was a success and Karnataka were offered another support with Jump in October 1999. Encouraged, the band had already started writing the material that would eventually appear on their second album, The Storm.

The Storm was recorded between August–November 1999 in Ian's studio. The album was then mixed at Rockfield Studios in Monmouthshire, Wales—a studio used by such notable bands as Rush, Man, Hawkwind, Queen and Clannad. Further live performances brought the band to the attention of record company Voiceprint through whom they are now distributed. The band toured the UK extensively with the new album, culminating in a show before an audience of die-hards at London's Mean Fiddler, which was filmed and subsequently released on DVD under licence to Classic Rock Productions. The DVD, entitled simply In Concert, was well received by fans but frustrated the band, who still felt that the results did not fully reflect their acclaimed live performances.

The In Concert DVD did, however, feature some new material the band was working on for their third album, although the songs were destined to change a little before they were recorded in the sessions for what was to become the band's breakthrough album. Delicate Flame of Desire, the band's third album, was recorded with producer Steve Evans and mixed by Joe Gibb. The album brought the band's music to a much wider audience with Radio 2 airplay and widespread media coverage. This album was the only Karnataka studio album to feature new member, Anne-Marie Helder, on flute and backing vocals. She had previously appeared on the band's In Concert DVD as one of three guest backing vocalists.

An in-depth interview with Ian Jones, Jonathan Edwards and Rachel Jones was conducted by Jon Hinchliffe in 2002, shortly before the release of. 'Delicate Flame of Desire'. In the interview, all three talk extensively about the origins of the band, the writing process and the dynamics of how the band operates.

Shortly after the release of Delicate Flame of Desire, Karnataka were invited to play their first shows overseas: indeed one of their first shows in the US was filmed and released on DVD as Live in the USA, again through Classic Rock Productions. The band were also working on more new material, some of which was premiered over the course of 2003 and 2004, as the band continued to expand their fanbase and received increasingly positive reviews. A double live album, Strange Behaviour, was released in mid-2004 to accompany what was to be the band's final tour with the existing line-up.

The live album is particularly notable for containing two previously unreleased new songs - Talk To Me and These Dreams Are Over.

Although another tour of the UK was in the early planning stages, in August 2004 the band's website was updated with a notice that due to unforeseen personal circumstances, the band had decided not to continue. There followed a period of inactivity, during which the members of the band embarked upon new musical projects.

Ian Jones joined forces with songwriter Steve Evans and guitarist Ian Simmons to record an under the moniker Chasing The Monsoon and would be joined later by Lisa Fury performing vocals.

Rachel Jones decided to take time out from the music business and returned to college, although she appeared on recordings from other bands and occasionally took to the stage as well, most notably with Mostly Autumn. She subsequently joined Cardiff-based rock band, The Reasoning, as a vocalist in late 2006.

The remaining members of the original line-up of Karnataka, Paul Davies, Jonathan Edwards, and Gavin Griffiths, along with Anne-Marie Helder, formed Panic Room in 2008.

=== 2005–2017: New line-ups ===
Karnataka was then resurrected as a band when Ian Jones started writing with keyboardist Gonzalo Carrera. The new Karnataka featured a line-up consisting of Jones and Carrera along with vocalist Lisa Fury, drummer Louie Palmer, and guitarist Enrico Pinna. This new line-up of the band toured in Spring 2007 playing a selection of fan favourites and four or five new songs to provide a flavour of the work in progress.

Following Palmer's departure from the band later in 2007, Karnataka were joined by Ian Harris, who had previously played with a multitude of acts, including Chris Rea, Mica Paris and Nitin Sawhney.

Work on the band's fourth studio album The Gathering Light continued in 2007 although started in 2005 with all three writers; Ian Jones, Lisa Fury & Gonzalo Carrera. The band continued to tour. This time the old favourites took a back seat to a slew of new material, showcasing the band's confidence in their post-split writing. The tour was very well received, resulting in strong voting for the band and the individual musicians in 2008's Classic Rock Society awards, even though the band had yet to release any recordings with the new line-up.

The fourth Karnataka studio album, The Gathering Light, was finally released in February 2010, although fans who had pre-ordered a special edition of the album received their copies slightly earlier. The band embarked on a string of live dates to promote the album, which had already received some exceptionally positive reviews. It also featured in many music magazines - Classic Rock Society, Get Ready To Rock, Fireworks Magazine with a featured track on the accompanying cd, Dutch Progressive Rock Page, Powerplay Magazine, Musical Discoveries & Where Worlds Collide, inc front page of Classic Rock Society Magazine. The Gathering Light also Winner of Best International Album at the Prog Awards.

"The Gathering Light stands true to Karnataka's heritage, yet illustrates significant artistic growth since the former lineup's Delicate Flame of Desire release six years ago. progressive rock influences are more apparent [...] While their fans have waited a long time for this release, the care taken in the writing, recording and production of The Gathering Light has delivered an outstanding progressive rock album..."

In May 2010, Ian Harris, Gonzalo Carrera and Lisa Fury announced on their websites that for personal reasons they would be leaving the band. It was announced in October 2010 that Ian Harris would be replaced by former Karnataka drummer Louie Palmer, and in October 2010 multi-instrumentalist Colin Mold was revealed as having joined the band in a new role. In February 2011, it was announced that Hayley Griffiths was the new lead vocalist for the band replacing Lisa Fury. Hayley was previously a lead vocalist with global phenomena Riverdance and Michael Flatley's Lord of the Dance. The band's new lineup was completed in March 2011, when Cagri Tozluoglu was announced as the band's new keyboard player. In September 2011 the new line-up announced an extensive 15 date tour of the UK would take place early in 2012, subsequently named the "New Light Tour". Following the departure of Palmer, the band were joined by Matt McDonough on drums. Following the completion of the 2012 tour, Mold departed the band, and was not replaced.

The band filmed and recorded their show at The Met Theatre in Bury on the New Light Tour. The show was enhanced by lights and lasers, and filmed in high definition. The live DVD and was released in late 2012. The band continued to tour this show into 2013.

The band revealed in August 2013 that they were working on a new album. It was revealed on 31 May 2014 that the band had hired drummer Jimmy Pallagrosi following the departure of Matt McDonough. The long-awaited album was released on 7 March 2015, with the first copies being available at the concert in Derby and preorders shipped the next week. The album contains 8 tracks, including the title track, a '20-minute epic opus'. Other tracks on the album include Forbidden Dreams, Poison Ivy and Feels Like Home, which were previewed on the Forbidden Dreams tour in 2012/13. The band went on a UK tour starting on 28 February, playing every track from the new album each night. The band continued to tour the Secrets of Angels album through 2016 and 2017, both in the UK and Europe. A DVD was recorded in London in 2016 and was released in December 2017. 2017 also saw a tour entitled 'End II End', which saw the band perform the albums The Gathering Light and Secrets of Angels in their entirety.

Keyboard player Cagri Tozluoglu decided to step down from the band towards the end of 2017, with guitarist Enrico Pinna also indicating he was likely to leave the band to pursue other commitments. Following a concert at the Robin on 3 December, band leader Ian Jones announced on Facebook that the current line up of the band had come to an end and it would likely continue with a new line up.

=== 2018–present: line-up changes ===
In February 2018, Ian Jones announced on the band's website that Gonzalo Carrera had rejoined the band, and that they were working together on new material. In August 2018, the band announced new drummer Filippo Galli, and in November 2018 the band announced new vocalist/pianist Sertari and guitarist Luke Machin.

In 2021 Galli was replaced by Chris Allan for the recording of a new album and 2022 tour. In 2022 Carrera left the band and was later replaced, In 2023, by Rob Wilsher. In June 2023 the album Requiem for a Dream was released. For their 2023 tour, Jack Summerfield took over drum duties and continued to into 2024.

== Members ==
=== Current members ===
Image	Name	Years active	Instruments	Release contributions
	Ian Jones	1997–present	bass; acoustic guitars; keyboards; bass pedals; occasional vocals	all releases
	Luke Machin	2018–present	guitars	Requiem for a Dream (2023)
	Sertari	2018–present	lead vocals; piano	Requiem for a Dream (2023)
	Rob Wilsher	2023–present	keyboards	none to date
	Jack Summerfield	2023–present	drums; percussion	none to date

=== Former members ===
Image	Name	Years active	Instruments	Release contributions
	Paul Davies	1997–2004	guitars; backing vocals	all releases from Karnataka (1998) to Strange Behaviour (2004)
	Jonathan Edwards	1997–2004	keyboards; backing vocals	all releases from Karnataka (1998) to Strange Behaviour (2004)
	Gareth Griffiths	1997–2004	drums; percussion	all releases from Karnataka (1998) to Strange Behaviour (2004)
	Rachel Jones	1997–2004	lead vocals	all releases from Karnataka (1998) to Strange Behaviour (2004)
	Anne-Marie Helder	2003–2004	flute; percussion; backing vocals	In Concert (2002); Delicate Flame of Desire (2003); Live in the USA (2003); Strange Behaviour (2004)
	Gonzalo Carrera	2005–2010; 2018–2022	keyboards	The Gathering Light (2010); Requiem for a Dream (2023)
	Lisa Fury	2005–2010	lead vocals	The Gathering Light (2010)
	Bob Dalton	2005–2006	drums; percussion	none
	Nick May	2005–2006	guitars	none
	Enrico Pinna	2006–2017	guitars; backing vocals	The Gathering Light (2010); New Light Live in Concert (2012); Secrets of Angels (2015); Secrets of Angels Live in Concert (2018)
	Louie Palmer	2006–2007; 2010–2011	drums; percussion	none
	Ian Harris	2007–2010	drums; percussion	The Gathering Light (2010)
	Colin Mold	2010–2012	guitars; keyboards; violin; backing vocals	New Light Live in Concert (2012)
	Hayley Griffiths	2011–2017	lead vocals	New Light Live in Concert (2012); Secrets of Angels (2015); Secrets of Angels Live in Concert (2018)
	Cagri Tozluoglu	2011–2017	keyboards	New Light Live in Concert (2012); Secrets of Angels (2015); Secrets of Angels Live in Concert (2018)
	Matt McDonough	2011–2014	drums; percussion	New Light Live in Concert (2012)
	Jimmy Pallagrosi	2014–2017	drums; percussion	Secrets of Angels (2015); Secrets of Angels Live in Concert (2018)
	Filippo Galli	2018–2021	drums; percussion	none
	Chris Allan	2021–2022	drums; percussion	Requiem for a Dream (2023)

=== Lineups ===
1997-2003	2003-2004	2004-2005	2005
Paul Davies - electric guitar; Jonathan Edwards - keyboards; Gareth Griffiths - drums, percussion; Ian Jones - bass, acoustic guitars, keyboards, bass pedals; Rachel Jones - lead vocals	Paul Davies - electric guitar; Jonathan Edwards - keyboards; Gareth Griffiths - drums, percussion; Ian Jones - bass, acoustic guitars, keyboards, bass pedals; Rachel Jones - lead vocals; Anne-Marie Helder - flute, backing vocals	Disbanded	Ian Jones - bass, acoustic guitars, keyboards, bass pedals; Gonzalo Carrera - keyboards; Bob Dalton - drums, percussion; Nick May - electric guitar
2005-2007	2007-2010	2010-2011	2011
Ian Jones - bass, acoustic guitars, keyboards, bass pedals; Gonzalo Carrera - keyboards; Lisa Fury - lead vocals; Louie Palmer - drums, percussion; Enrico Pinna - electric guitar	Ian Jones - bass, acoustic guitars, keyboards, bass pedals; Gonzalo Carrera - keyboards; Lisa Fury - lead vocals; Enrico Pinna - electric guitar; Ian Harris - drums, percussion	Ian Jones - bass, acoustic guitars, keyboards, bass pedals; Enrico Pinna - electric guitar; Colin Mold - keyboards, backing vocals; Louie Palmer - drums, percussion	Ian Jones - bass, acoustic guitars, keyboards, bass pedals; Enrico Pinna - electric guitar; Colin Mold - keyboards, backing vocals; Louie Palmer - drums, percussion; Hayley Griffiths - lead vocals
2011	2011-2012	2012–2014	2014–2017
Ian Jones - bass, acoustic guitars, keyboards, bass pedals; Enrico Pinna - electric guitar; Colin Mold - keyboards, backing vocals; Louie Palmer - drums, percussion; Hayley Griffiths - lead vocals; Cagri Tozluoglu - keyboards	Ian Jones - bass, acoustic guitars, keyboards, bass pedals; Enrico Pinna - electric guitar; Colin Mold - violin, electric and acoustic guitars, backing vocals; Hayley Griffiths - lead vocals; Cagri Tozluoglu - keyboards; Matt McDonough - drums, percussion	Ian Jones - bass, acoustic guitars, keyboards, bass pedals; Enrico Pinna - electric guitar; Hayley Griffiths - lead vocals; Cagri Tozluoglu - keyboards; Matt McDonough - drums, percussion	Ian Jones - bass, acoustic guitars, keyboards, bass pedals; Enrico Pinna - electric guitar; Hayley Griffiths - lead vocals; Cagri Tozluoglu - keyboards; Jimmy Pallagrosi - drums, percussion
2018–2022	2022–2023	2023–present
Ian Jones - bass, acoustic guitars, keyboards, bass pedals; Gonzalo Carrera - keyboards; Filippo Galli - drums, percussion; Luke Machin - guitars; Sertari - lead vocals, piano	Ian Jones - bass, acoustic guitars, keyboards, bass pedals; Luke Machin - guitars; Sertari - lead vocals, piano; Chris Allan - drums, percussion	Ian Jones - bass, acoustic guitars, keyboards, bass pedals; Luke Machin - guitars; Sertari - lead vocals, piano; Jack Summerfield - drums, percussion; Rob Wilsher - keyboards

== Discography ==
=== Studio ===
- Karnataka (1998)
- The Storm (2000)
- Delicate Flame of Desire (2003)
- The Gathering Light (2010)
- Secrets of Angels (2015)
- Requiem for a Dream (2023)

=== Live ===
- Strange Behaviour (2004)
- New Light Live in Concert (2012)
- Secrets of Angels Live in Concert (2018)
- Requiem for a Night - Live in Zoetermeer (2025)

=== Video ===
- In Concert (2002)
- Live in the USA (2003)
- New Light Live in Concert (2012)
- Secrets of Angels Live in Concert (2018)
- Requiem for a Night - Live in Zoetermeer (2025)
