= The Storm (Karnataka album) =

Studio album by Karnataka
- Released: 2000
- Genre: Progressive rock
- Length: 55:10
- Label: Immrama Records
- Producer: Rachel Jones, Ian Jones & Jonathan Edwards

Karnataka chronology
Karnataka (1998)	The Storm (2000)	Delicate Flame of Desire (2003)

The Storm is the second studio album by progressive rock band Karnataka, released by Immrama Records in 2000.

== Track listing ==
All lyrics written by R. Jones, all music written by J. Edwards, I.Jones, and R. Jones.

1. "Heaven Can Wait" - 5:15
2. "Dreamer" - 3:39
3. "The Journey" - 8:25
4. "Hay" - 4:30
5. "Love and Affection" - 4:42
6. "I Should Have Known" - 6:13
7. "Everything Must Change" - 5:29
8. "Shine" - 4:48
9. "Writing on the Wall" - 5:21
10. "The Storm" - 8:48

== Personnel ==
- Rachel Jones - lead vocals
- Paul Davies - electric guitars
- Ian Jones - bass, acoustic guitars, bodhran, samples
- Jonathan Edwards - keyboards
- Gavin Griffiths - drums, percussion

Additional personnel

- Peter Davies - Scottish small pipes (10)
- Steve Evans - programming (2 and 3)
- Jenny Hooker - recorder (10)
- Steve Simmons - alto and tenor saxophones (4)
