= Gonzalo Carrera =

Spanish keyboard player

Gonzalo Carrera is a Spanish keyboard player who has performed in several progressive rock bands. He is best known as a former member of the British progressive rock bands Landmarq (2002–2005) and Karnataka (2005–2010, 2018–2022).

Carrera has also previously worked with Spanish progressive rock band Galadriel and British-American progressive rock band Quasar, as well as on solo projects by former members of Hawkwind (Huw Lloyd-Langton), Jethro Tull (Clive Bunker and Glenn Cornick), Karnataka (Nick May), The Nice (David O'List), and Yes (Peter Banks).

Carrera is currently recording a new album with the London fusion outfit Infusion. The band consists of Carrera (keyboards), Danny Berdichewskie (guitars), Rob Statham (bass; has previously worked with Keith Emerson and Nucleus) and Olie Usiskin (drums). Guests on the album include drummer Pete Cater, guitarist John Etheridge (formerly of Soft Machine), arranger and trombonist Mike Gibbs (who has worked with Jan Akkerman, Peter Gabriel, Mahavishnu Orchestra, and Jaco Pastorius), saxophonist John Helliwell (Supertramp), cellist Hugh McDowell (formerly of Electric Light Orchestra), and flautist Rowland Sutherland.

== Sources ==
- MySpace page
- Infusion webpage
- 3 of the Essence tour with Whimwise
