= The Gathering Light =

Studio album by Karnataka
- Released: 15 February 2010
- Genre: Progressive rock
- Label: Voiceprint

Karnataka chronology
Delicate Flame of Desire (2003)	The Gathering Light (2010)	Secrets of Angels (2015)

Professional ratings
Review scores
Source	Rating
DPRP	(9/10)

The Gathering Light is the fourth studio album by progressive rock band Karnataka, released by Voiceprint on 15 February 2010 to favourable reviews. It was the band's first studio album in seven years, and featured only bassist Ian Jones from the previous lineup.

== Track listing ==
1. "The Calling" (Instrumental) (Jones)
2. "State of Grace" (Instrumental) (Carrera/Jones)
3. "Your World" (Carrera/Fury/Jones)
4. "Moment in Time" (Fury/Jones)
5. "Serpent and the Sea" (Fury/Jones)
6. "Forsaken"
  1. "Forsaken" (Fury/Jones)
  2. "Glowing Embers" (Instrumental) (Jones)
  3. "Distant Echoes" (Fury/Jones)
7. "Tide to Fall" (Fury/Jones)
8. "The Gathering Light" (Carrera/Fury/Jones)

== Personnel ==
- Gonzalo Carrera - keyboards, piano
- Lisa Fury - vocals, percussion
- Ian Harris - drums
- Ian Jones - bass, keybass, piano, percussion, bodhran, programming
- Enrico Pinna - electric and acoustic guitars

Additional personnel

- Troy Donockley - uilleann pipes, whistles (4, 6, and 8)
- Hugh McDowell - cello (2, 6, 7, and 8)

String Quartet

- Bridget Davey - violin (4, 6, and 8)
- Jane Fenton - cello (4, 6, and 8)
- Philippe Honoré - violin (4, 6, and 8)
- Clive Howard - viola (4, 6, and 8)
