= Delicate Flame of Desire =

Studio album by Karnataka
- Released: 10 February 2003
- Genre: Progressive rock
- Length: 61:29
- Label: Immrama Records

Karnataka chronology
The Storm (2000)	Delicate Flame of Desire (2003)	The Gathering Light (2010)

Delicate Flame of Desire is the third studio album by progressive rock band Karnataka, released by Immrama Records on 10 February 2003. It was the final Karnataka album to feature all five of the original band members, as bassist Ian Jones was the only remaining founding member left by the time The Gathering Light, the band's fourth album, was released.

== Track listing ==
All lyrics written by R. Jones.

1. "Karnataka" (Instrumental) (J. Edwards/I. Jones) - 2:54
2. "Time Stands Still" (P. Davies/J. Edwards/I. Jones/R. Jones) - 6:17
3. "Delicate Flame of Desire" (J. Edwards/I. Jones/R. Jones) - 7:34
4. "After the Rain" (J. Edwards/I. Jones/R. Jones) - 7:52
5. "Strange Behaviour" (J. Edwards/I. Jones/R. Jones) - 6:10
6. "The Right Time" (P. Davies/J. Edwards/I. Jones/R. Jones) - 7:06
7. "One Breath Away" (I. Jones/R. Jones) - 5:13
8. "Out of Reach" (I. Jones/R. Jones) - 7:48
9. "Heart of Stone" (J. Edwards/I. Jones/R. Jones) - 10:31

== Personnel ==
- Rachel Jones - lead vocals, percussion
- Paul Davies - electric guitars
- Ian Jones - bass, acoustic guitars, percussion, vocals
- Jonathan Edwards - keyboards, backing vocals
- Gavin Griffiths - drums, percussion
- Anne-Marie Helder - flute, percussion, backing vocals

Additional personnel

- Steve Evans - programming
- Heather Findlay - vocals (2, 6, and 9)
