= Anne-Marie Helder =

British singer and songwriter

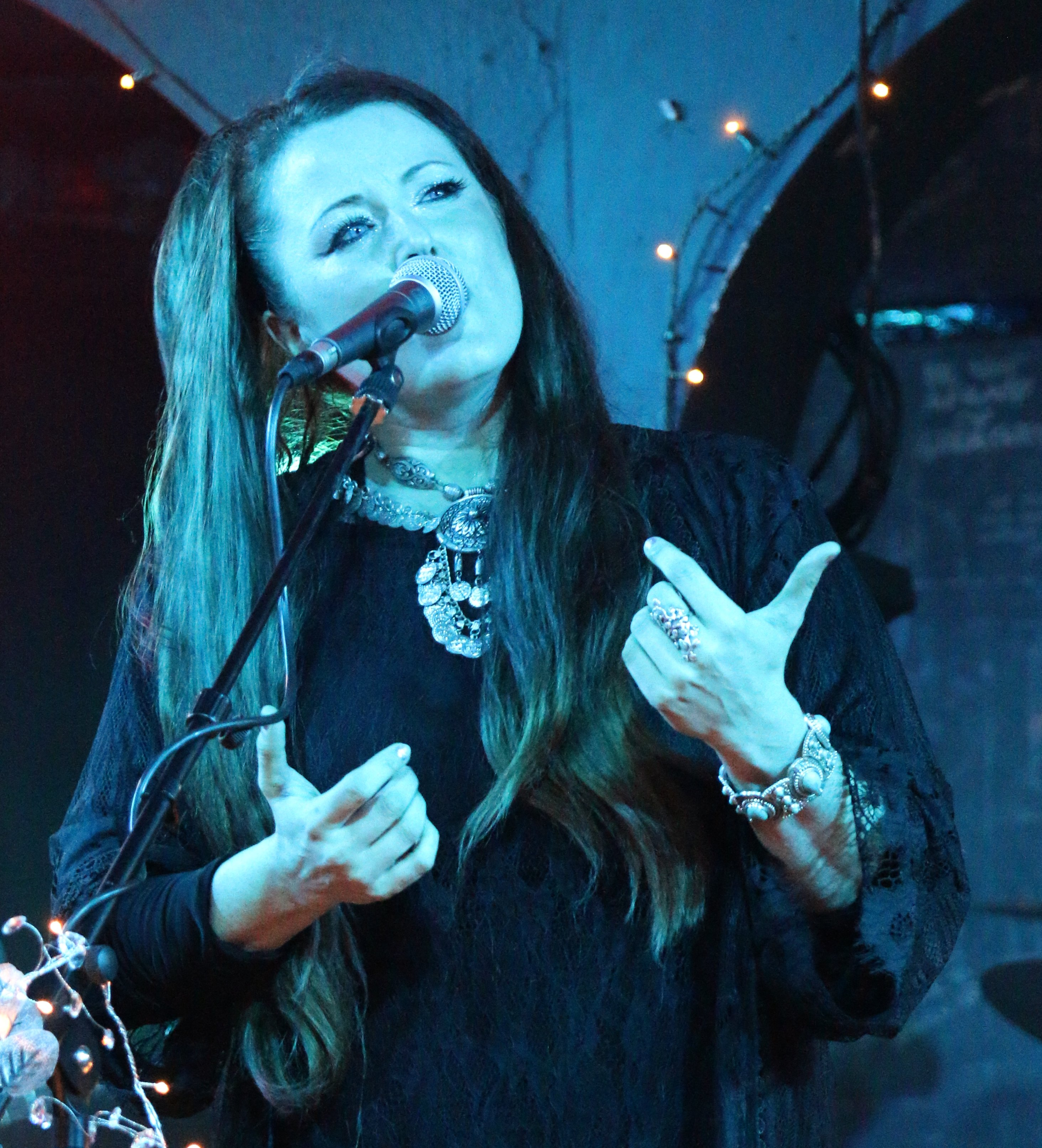
- Helder with Panic Room in 2017

Background information
- Born: 1 June 1976 (age 49)
- Origin: England
- Genres: Acoustic rock; experimental rock; progressive rock
- Occupations: Singer; songwriter
- Instruments: Vocals; flute; guitar; keyboards
- Years active: 2004–present
- Labels: Firefly Music; Esoteric Antenna
- Member of: Panic Room
- Formerly of: Creamy Jobe; Karnataka; Luna Rossa; Mostly Autumn

Anne-Marie Helder (born 1 June 1976) is a British singer and songwriter, best known for fronting the UK rock band Panic Room. She has also performed internationally as a solo artist and with various bands since circa the year 2000.

In 2005 she supported Fish on his Return to Childhood tour, and since then she has opened shows for artists including Midge Ure, Nick Harper, Glenn Tilbrook (of Squeeze) and then was the supporting act for the Ultravox tour in 2010.

== History ==
=== Creamy Jobe ===
From 1999 to 2002, Helder was a member of the band Creamy Jobe, based in South Wales, in which she was one of three lead vocalists. Helder also played the keyboard and flute. Writing their own music, the band also included Guy Wendon, Chris Woodman, Mathew Dermody and Steve Lott.

Creamy Jobe were selected to play for the BBC Music Live Week in 2000, which saw them tour music venues around the Swansea area and culminated in a performance on the BBC stage in Singleton Park, Swansea on 20 May 2000. This coincided with their only album release – Creamy Jobe Greatest Hits II – Voices on Vinyl.

Helder appeared with Creamy Jobe on 23 August 2014 in a reunion to celebrate 15 years since the original formation of the band.

=== Karnataka ===
From 2001 to 2004, Helder was a member of the Welsh band Karnataka, along with Jonathan Edwards and two other members of Panic Room (Paul Davies and Gavin John Griffiths). When the band split in 2004, these four continued to work together, which is where the ideas and music for Panic Room were born. Karnataka bassist Ian Jones later reformed the band without any of the other former members.

=== Solo album ===
Helder released her solo EP The Contact in November 2004, which received positive reviews and secured airplay on BBC Radio 2, with DJ Bob Harris declaring: "this is very dramatic music". UK national music magazine Classic Rock gave the EP an 8/10 review, and since its release Helder has toured across the UK, Europe and the US, playing both headline shows and supports for other artists.

=== Panic Room ===
In 2006 Helder began working with a group of musicians, including Paul Davies, Jonathan Edwards, and Gavin Griffiths, all of whom she had performed with previously in Karnataka, to start a new band project. This band evolved to become Panic Room.

In 2008 they released their debut album Visionary Position, and in 2010 the follow-up album Satellite was released. The multi-award-winning album also secured Helder her first award as an individual, for her voice: she was voted Best Female Vocalist in the 2010 Classic Rock Presents Prog magazine Reader's Poll, and has gone on to win the award for an unprecedented second year running.

Panic Room toured extensively to promote the Satellite album, and in 2011 played their largest run of dates yet, performing over 20 shows in 6 weeks in the UK alone.

At the beginning of 2012 the band signed a record deal with Esoteric Antenna and Cherry Red Records, for their next album S K I N. This would be Panic Room's first album released on a label, having been purely independent up until this point. The first two albums and Incarnate from 2014 were released on the band's own label Firefly Music, of which Helder is a business partner.

In 2013, Helder and fellow Panic Room member Jonathan Edwards, formed the acoustic music duo Luna Rossa. They released their debut album Sleeping Pills & Lullabies in 2013 with the follow up Secrets & Lies being released in November 2014.

=== Other projects ===
Anne-Marie Helder also plays sessions and records guest vocals for other musical artists.

- She tours with fellow UK rock band Mostly Autumn, playing keyboards, flute and backing vocals. Helder first collaborated with the band when she played some solo supports for them in 2007, and later that year she agreed to substitute for flautist and keyboardist Angela Gordon while the latter took maternity leave to have her first child. In early 2008, there were many shuffles to the line-up of the band, and as both Gordon and keyboardist Chris Johnson left to pursue other projects, Helder was invited to join them to play keyboards, acoustic guitar, flute and backing vocals. Helder recorded vocals and flute with Mostly Autumn on the 2008 album Glass Shadows, and has appeared on every album since.
- She has supported Steve Hackett in 2013 on his Genesis Revisited II tour.
- She has also performed guest vocals on the Icon project by John Wetton and Geoff Downes, the dance album Electronica by Geoff Downes, and albums by other artists including Dave Kilminster, Parade (now Halo Blind) and The SKYS.

== Personal life ==
Helder went to art college, but opted out and studied philosophy instead and earned a degree in Swansea. She has been vegetarian since the age of 15.

Helder is a scuba diver qualified by PADI.

== Discography ==
Solo

- The Contact EP (2004)

Creamy Jobe

- Greatest Hits II – Voices on Vinyl (2000)

Karnataka

- Delicate Flame of Desire (2002)
- Strange Behaviour (2004)

Mostly Autumn

- Heart Full of Sky (2007)
- Glass Shadows (2008)
- Pass the Clock (2009)
- Go Well Diamond Heart (2010)
- The Ghost Moon Orchestra (2012)

Luna Rossa

- Sleeping Pills & Lullabies (2013)
- Secrets & Lies (2014)
- Atropa (2018)

Panic Room

- Visionary Position (2008)
- Satellite (2010)
- Skin (2012)
- Altitude EP (2013)
- Incarnate (2014)
- Essence (2015)
- Screens: Live In London (2017)

Tigerdragon

- Life Stories (2001)
- The Universal Key (2002)

=== Guest appearances ===
Dave Kilminster

- Scarlet (2007)

Iain Jennings

- The House (Guest on track 3) (2017)

Fish

- Communion (2007)

John Wetton and Geoff Downes

- Icon 3 (2009)

Parade

- The Fabric (2009)
