= Satellite (Panic Room album) =

Studio album by Panic Room
- Released: 25 January 2010
- Recorded: Sonic One Studios, Llangennech, Wales, 2009
- Genre: Progressive rock
- Length: 58:50
- Label: Firefly Music Ltd.
- Producer: Jonathan Edwards, Anne-Marie Helder & Tim Hamill

Panic Room chronology
Visionary Position (2008)	Satellite (2010)	Skin (2012)

Professional ratings
Review scores
Source	Rating
Allmusic	3/5 stars

Satellite is the second album by Welsh progressive rock band Panic Room. This album saw the band retreat somewhat from the very 'progressive' approach to their debut album Visionary Position and the result is a more cohesive, song-orientated album.

The album was recorded at Sonic One Studios in Wales by Tim Hamill and the artwork was designed and created by Teslin Davies.

Pre-orders of the album were released in 2009. A special edition, complete with a bonus disc containing four extra songs is available exclusively from the band's own website and at live concerts. The single disc retail version was released on 25 January 2010. This was the final album to feature the original lineup, as Alun Vaughan left the band during the summer of 2010.

== Track listing ==
=== Satellite ===
1. "Freedom to Breathe" (Edwards/Helder) – 5:33
2. "Picking Up Knives" (Edwards/Helder) − 5:10
3. "I Am a Cat" (Edwards/Helder) − 4:37
4. "The Fall" (Edwards/Helder) − 6:16
5. "Black Noise" (Helder/Vaughan) − 3:59
6. "Yasuni" (Davies/Edwards/Helder) − 5:14
7. "Sunshine" (Edwards/Helder) − 6:02
8. "Into the Fire" (Edwards/Field/Helder) − 5:00
9. "Dark Star" (Edwards/Helder) − 5:11
10. "Muse" (Edwards/Helder) − 3:43
11. "Satellite" (Edwards/Helder) − 8:05

=== Little Satellite – two-disc version only available from the band's website ===
1. "5th Amendment" (Edwards/Helder) − 4:17
2. "The Great Divide" (Helder/Vaughan) − 5:30
3. "Go" (Edwards/Helder) − 4:08
4. "Sandstorms" (Edwards/Helder) − 10:08

== Personnel ==
- Anne-Marie Helder – lead/backing vocals; electric/acoustic guitars; keyboards; piano
- Paul Davies – electric/acoustic guitars
- Alun Vaughan – bass guitars
- Jonathan Edwards – keyboards; piano; Fender Rhodes
- Gavin Griffiths – drums
