= Landmarq =

British progressive rock band

- Origin: United Kingdom
- Genres: Progressive rock
- Years active: 1990–present
- Members: Uwe D'rose; Steve Gee; Mike Varty; Andy Allen; Wolf Campen
- Past members: Dave Wagstaffe; Steve Leigh; Rob Lewis-Jones; Damian Wilson; Ian 'Moon' Gould; Gonzalo Carrera; Tracy Hitchings; Danny Martin
- Website: www.landmarq.net

Landmarq (pronounced like "landmark") are a British neo-prog band. Since forming in 1990, they have so far released a total of ten albums, four of which were recorded live at various concerts in the UK and elsewhere in Europe, plus two full concert DVDs.

== History ==
Initially signing to a Dutch record company, SI Music, then forming their own label, Synergy Records, the band have established themselves within the world of progressive rock, though their style may also extend into album-oriented rock, melodic rock, hard rock and even a slightly jazz edge.

Vocalist Damian Wilson left the band after three albums to concentrate on his solo career and the band found a replacement in Ian 'Moon' Gould. He spent a year with the band, playing various gigs in the UK and the Netherlands, before deciding to move on. It was at this point that Landmarq decided to go for a radical change to their sound and recruited the long-time friend of the band, Tracy Hitchings, who formerly sang with Quasar.

Landmarq have played concerts in the UK, the Netherlands, Germany, Belgium, France, Poland, Italy, the US and Mexico; both as support and as headliners at various festivals and music venues. The band have worked with many including Marillion, Focus, John Wetton, Steve Hackett, Hugh McDowell, Nik Turner, Annie Haslam IQ, Pendragon, Arena and Suzi Quatro.

Apart from making strong in-roads into Europe and America, Landmarq have reached further territories worldwide, as far afield as Russia, eastern Europe, the Far East, and Australia through various magazine/webzine articles, interviews, radio air-play and also compilation CDs from various music magazines.

The band's first DVD was released in March 2006. Entitled Turbulence – Live In Poland, it featured Landmarq filmed in concert at the Wyspianski Theatre, Katowice, in November 2005. The DVD was released by the Polish label Metal Mind Productions. The DVD also comprised a wealth of bonus material including audio and video archive tracks, an interview with the band, and photo gallery.

Following an enforced break for a few years, Landmarq re-emerged in 2012 with the release of their fifth album, Entertaining Angels, a 'Special Edition' double-CD set. This was followed up with "Angels On Tour", a series of live dates through 2012-2013, that saw Landmarq performing in various festivals and venues again in the UK, the Netherlands, Belgium and Germany.

== Personnel ==
=== Members ===
Current members

- Uwe D'rose - guitars (1990–present)
- Steve Gee - basses, vocals (1990–present)
- Mike Varty - keyboards, vocals (2005–present)
- Andy Allen - drums (2018–present)
- Wolf Campen - lead vocals (2018–present)

Former members

- Dave Wagstaffe - drums (1990–2012)
- Steve Leigh - keyboards, vocals (1990–2002)
- Rob Lewis-Jones - lead vocals (1990–1991)
- Damian Wilson - lead vocals (1991–1993, 1995–1996)
- Ian 'Moon' Gould - lead vocals (1993–1995)
- Tracy Hitchings - lead vocals (1996–2017, died 2022)
- Gonzalo Carrera - keyboards (2002–2005)
- Danny Martin - drums (2012–2017)

=== Lineups ===
1990–1991	1991–1993	1993–1995	1995–1996
Uwe D'rose - guitar; Steve Gee - bass; Steve Leigh - keyboards; Rob Lewis-Jones - vocals; Dave Wagstaffe - drums	Uwe D'rose - guitar; Steve Gee - bass; Steve Leigh - keyboards; Dave Wagstaffe - drums; Damian Wilson - vocals	Uwe D'rose - guitar; Steve Gee - bass; Steve Leigh - keyboards; Dave Wagstaffe - drums; Ian 'Moon' Gould - vocals	Uwe D'rose - guitar; Steve Gee - bass; Steve Leigh - keyboards; Dave Wagstaffe - drums; Damian Wilson - vocals
1996-2002	2002-2005	2005-2012	2012–2017
Uwe D'rose - guitar; Steve Gee - bass; Steve Leigh - keyboards; Dave Wagstaffe - drums; Tracy Hitchings - vocals	Uwe D'rose - guitar; Steve Gee - bass; Dave Wagstaffe - drums; Tracy Hitchings - vocals; Gonzalo Carrera - keyboards	Uwe D'rose - guitar; Steve Gee - bass; Dave Wagstaffe - drums; Tracy Hitchings - vocals; Mike Varty - keyboards	Uwe D'rose - guitar; Steve Gee - bass; Tracy Hitchings - vocals; Mike Varty - keyboards; Danny Martin - drums
2018–present
Uwe D'rose - guitar; Steve Gee - bass; Mike Varty - keyboards; Andy Allen - drums; Wolf Campen - vocals

== Discography ==
=== Studio albums ===
- Solitary Witness (1992)
- Infinity Parade (1993)
- The Vision Pit (1995)
- Science of Coincidence (1998)
- Entertaining Angels (2012)
- Entertaining Angels - Vinyl 2-LP Set (2014)

=== Live albums ===
- Thunderstruck (1999)
- Aftershock (2002)
- Turbulence - Live in Poland (2006 - DVD, 2009 - CD only)
- RoadSkill - Live in The Netherlands (2015 - DVD+CD set)

=== Compilations ===
- Origins: A Landmarq Anthology (2014) is a 2 disc compilation CD featuring songs taken from their debut album to their 2012 album, plus an additional brand new song, also entitled "Origins".

=== Other compilations ===
- SI 10th Anniversary Compilation Disc (1991 - SI Music) was the first-ever CD featuring Landmarq. This compilation, from the band's first record label in the Netherlands, features the abridged version of "Suite: St. Helens".
- SI (Germany) Compilation Disc Too (1992 - SI Music) features a track not used for first studio album Solitary Witness, entitled "Borrowed Mind". This track was later included on the Japanese release of Infinity Parade.
- Progressive & Melodic Rock Vol. 1 (1993 - SI Music) features "Terracotta Army".
- Progressive & Melodic Rock Vol. 3 (1994 - SI Music) features "Gaia's Waltz".
- Master Volume Perfect Compilation Series Vol. 5 (1994 - Zero Corp) is a Japanese compilation CD featuring "Embrace".
- Classic Rock (1994 - SI Music) features "Embrace".
- Hard Rock Magazine Ltd Edition (1996 - CNR Music) features "Cutting Room" and "Bed Of Nails".
- Mellotron 20 (1998 - CD Sampler) is a compilation CD from Mellotron magazine (Argentina) featuring "The Overlook", taken from Science Of Coincidence.
- Music From The Underground (1998 - sysy) is a compilation CD from German magazine Eclipsed featuring "The Vision Pit" from Science Of Coincidence.
- The Hawke Chill-Out Sessions (2006) is a CD compiled by radio presenter and DJ Terry Hawke, with artists he has featured on his show on Harborough FM. It includes the track "Heritage" from Aftershock.
- Mellotron 35 - Decimo Anniversario (2006 - CD Sampler) is a 10th anniversary compilation CD from Mellotron magazine featuring "Thunderstruck", taken from Turbulence - Live in Poland.

=== DVDs ===
- Turbulence - Live in Poland (2006)
- RoadSkill - Live in The Netherlands (2015)
