= Panic Room (band) =

Welsh progressive rock band

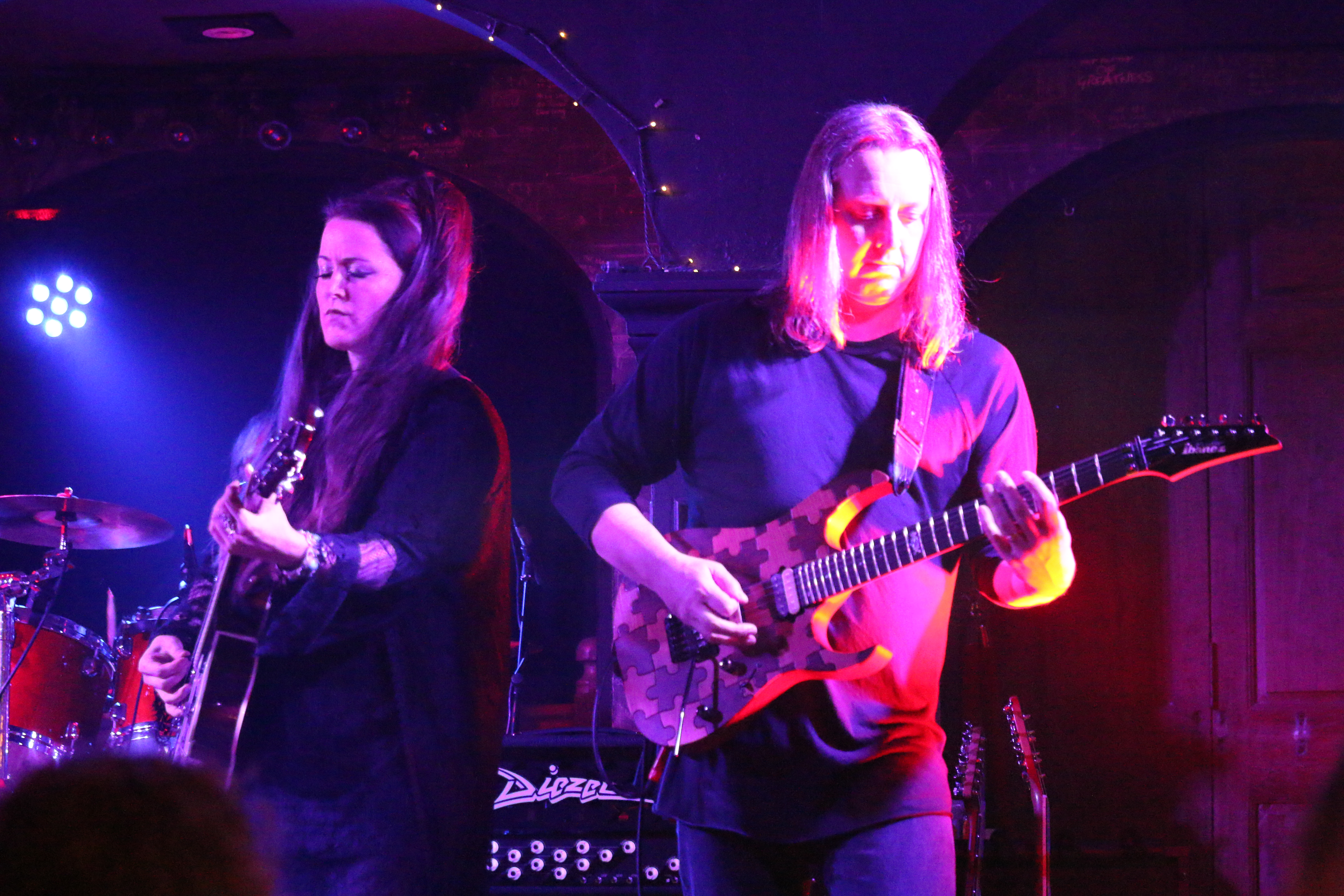
- Members of Panic Room perform in July, 2017

Background information
- Origin: Swansea, Wales
- Genres: Rock, alternative rock, experimental rock, folk rock, electronica, progressive rock
- Years active: 2006–present
- Label: Firefly Music
- Spinoff of: Karnataka
- Members: Jonathan Edwards; Gavin Griffiths; Anne-Marie Helder
- Past members: Paul Davies; Alun Vaughan; Yatim Halimi; Dave Foster
- Website: Official website

Panic Room is a Welsh progressive rock band founded by former Karnataka members Paul Davies, Jonathan Edwards, Gavin Griffiths, and Anne-Marie Helder; along with bassist Alun Vaughan, in 2006.

== History ==
Panic Room released their debut album Visionary Position in early 2008. In August 2009, it was announced that pre-orders were being taken for their upcoming second studio album Satellite. A UK tour followed through September, October and November 2009 supporting the upcoming release of Satellite. The pre-release version was released in December 2009 with the retail copy released in early 2010. The album was available in a single disc version and also as a special edition with an extra disc entitled 'Little Satellite' containing 4 extra songs recorded at the Satellite sessions. On 28 July 2010 it was announced on the band's website that founding bass player Alun Vaughan had left the band and had been replaced by Yatim Halimi.

On 4 March 2013, Paul Davies left the band for personal reasons. Touring commitments were fulfilled with Morpheus Rising guitarist Pete Harwood filling the void left by Davies. Following the culmination of the tour, Swansea musician, Adam O'Sullivan, was drafted in as a session guitarist for the recording of the band's fourth album, entitled "Incarnate", and the subsequent tour.

In 2015, Steve Rothery Band and Mr So&So guitarist, Dave Foster, appeared onstage with Panic Room as a session player on their Wildfire Tour and also played on their Kickstarter funded acoustic album Essence, before subsequently joining the band as a full member. 'Essence' was released as a single CD album and also as a special edition with a DVD containing 'The Making Of Essence': a documentary film of the production of the album.

Following a successful Pledge Campaign the band filmed a special concert on 16 October 2016 at Islington Assembly Hall for a live DVD release. The DVD was produced by award-winning company, Toward Infinity, who have filmed and produced live concert films for Marillion, Jon Lord, Bullet For My Valentine, Lisa Stansfield and Bring Me The Horizon among others. The resulting film was released as 'Screens - Live In London' in 2017 in a single disc version and a double DVD special edition which contained additional performances from the concert, plus rehearsal and soundcheck footage among other extras. The audio of the entire concert was also released as a double CD with the same title as the DVD (a special edition of the double CD was also produced with a 36-page photo booklet of images from the concert).

In late 2018 Panic Room announced that both Dave Foster and Yatim Halimi were leaving the band due to pressure of other commitments, but that remaining founder members, Jonathan Edwards, Gavin Griffiths and Anne-Marie Helder were committed to continue making music as Panic Room.

== Other work ==
Gavin Griffiths performs with former Marillion vocalist Fish, whilst Yatim Halimi and Dave Foster perform with Fish's former bandmate Steve Rothery in the Steve Rothery Band.

Panic Room's principal songwriters, Anne-Marie Helder and Jonathan Edwards also write and perform together outside of Panic Room with their acoustic project, Luna Rossa and Helder also records and performs as a solo artist.

In addition to his work with Panic Room, Edwards reunited with former Karnataka band mate and vocalist, Rachel Cohen to form a new musical project, Three Colours Dark. The pair have released two albums: 'The Science Of Goodbye' in 2020 and 'Love's Lost Property' in 2021.

Dave Foster has also released two solo albums under his own name ('Gravity' and 'Dreamless') and performs this material as The Dave Foster Band.

Both Griffiths and Helder have previously been members of Mostly Autumn, with Griffiths' tenure in that band running from 2009 until 2014, and Helder's running from 2007 until 2015, respectively.

== Personnel ==
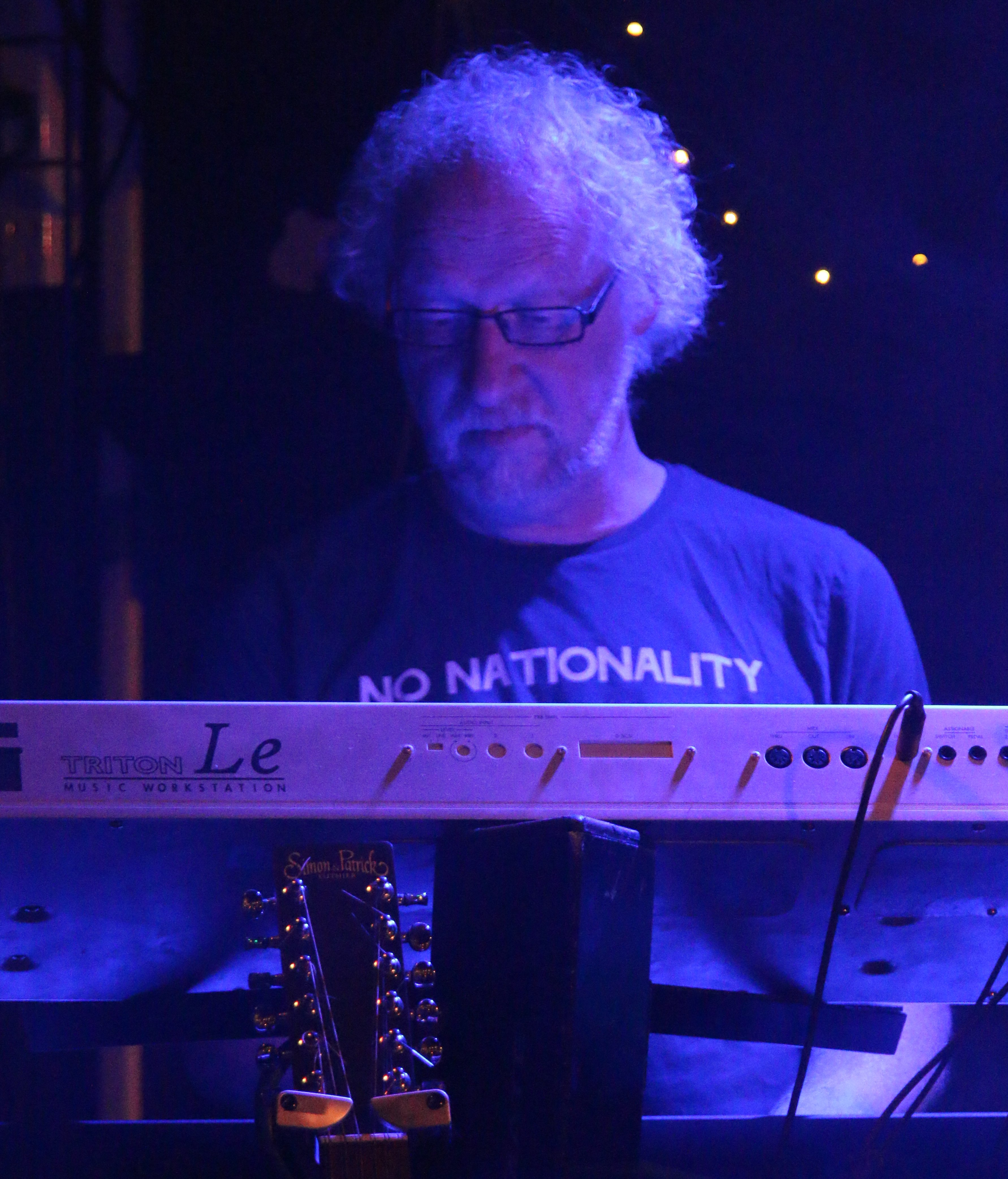
Edwards

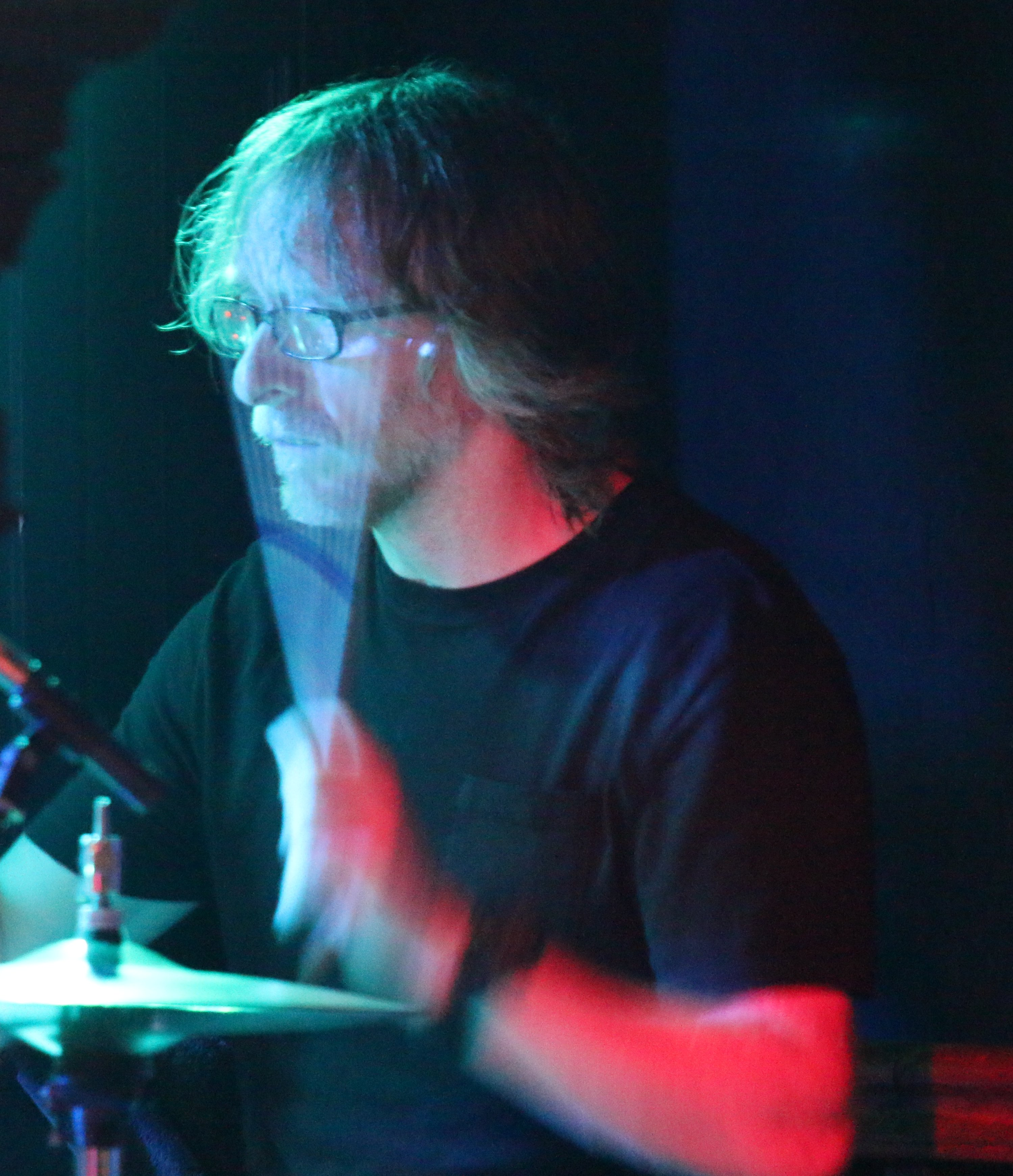
Griffiths

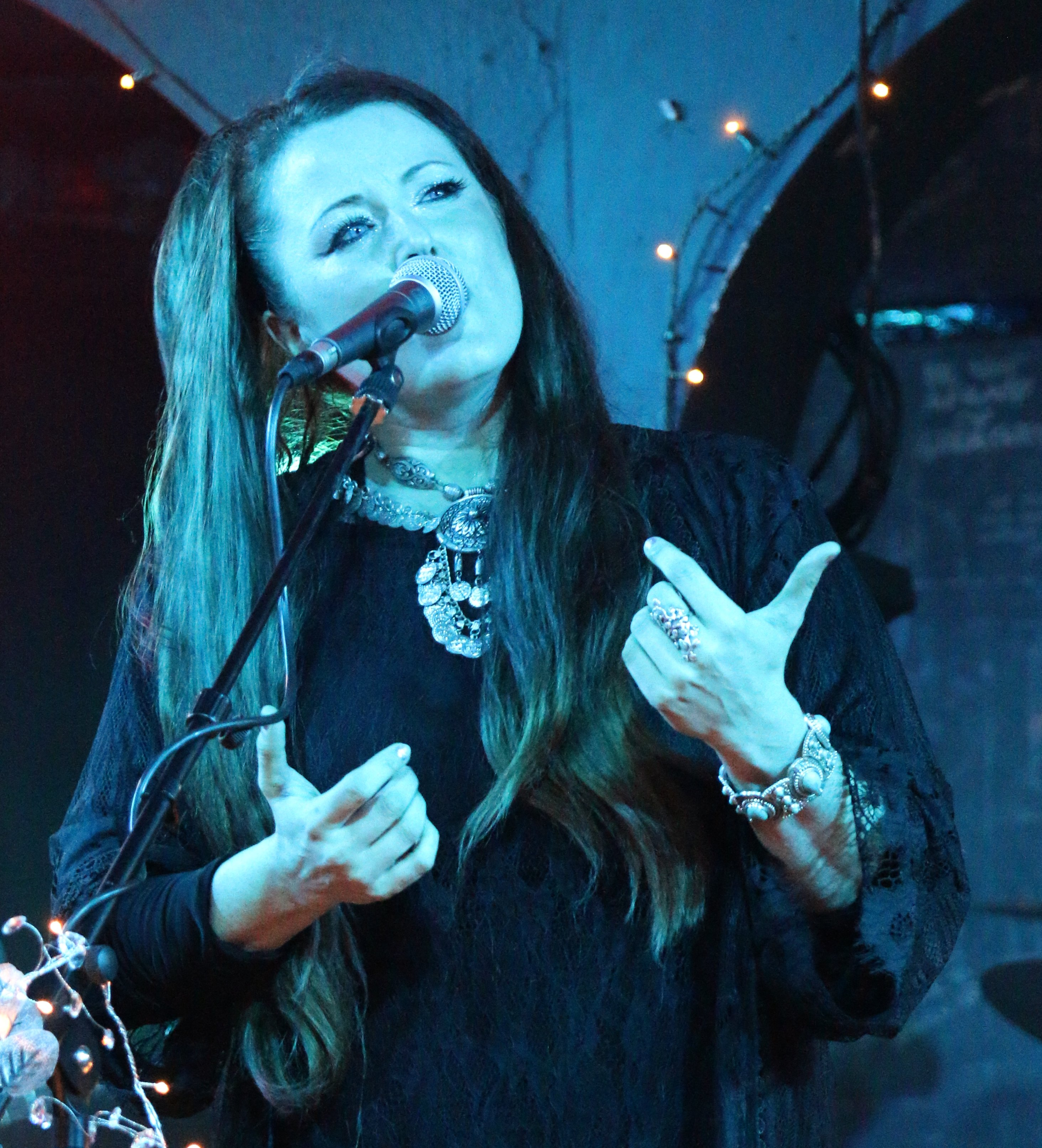
Helder

=== Members ===
Current members

- Jonathan Edwards – keyboards, synths (2006–present)
- Gavin Griffiths – drums (2006–present)
- Anne-Marie Helder – lead vocals, guitars, flute, keyboards (2006–present)

Former members

- Paul Davies – guitars, backing vocals (2006–2013)
- Alun Vaughan – bass (2006–2010)
- Yatim Halimi – bass (2010–2018)
- Dave Foster – guitars (2015–2018)

Live / Session musicians

- Pete Harwood – guitars (2013)
- Adam O'Sullivan – guitars (2013–2014)

=== Lineups ===
Years	Lineup	Albums
2006–2010	Paul Davies – guitars, backing vocals; Jonathan Edwards – keyboards, synthesisers; Gavin Griffiths – drums; Anne-Marie Helder – lead vocals, guitars, flute, keyboards; Alun Vaughan – bass	Visionary Position (2008); Satellite (2010); Altitude (2011)
2010–2013	Paul Davies – guitars, backing vocals; Jonathan Edwards – keyboards, synthesisers; Gavin Griffiths – drums; Anne-Marie Helder – lead vocals, guitars, flute, keyboards; Yatim Halimi – bass	S K I N (2012)
2013–2014	Jonathan Edwards – keyboards, synthesisers; Gavin Griffiths – drums; Anne-Marie Helder – lead vocals, guitars, flute, keyboards; Yatim Halimi – bass; Additional personnel: Pete Harwood – guitars (2013); Adam O'Sullivan – guitars (2013–2014)	Incarnate (2014)
2014–2018	Jonathan Edwards – keyboards, synthesisers; Gavin Griffiths – drums; Anne-Marie Helder – lead vocals, guitars, flute, keyboards; Yatim Halimi – bass; Dave Foster – guitars	Essence (2015); Screens – Live In London (2017)
2018–present	Jonathan Edwards – keyboards, synthesisers; Gavin Griffiths – drums; Anne-Marie Helder – lead vocals, guitars, flute, keyboards

== Discography ==
Studio

- Visionary Position (2008)
- Satellite (2010)
- SKIN (2012)
- Incarnate (2014)
- Essence (2015)
- SKIN (Extended Edition) (2018)

EP

- Altitude (2011)

Live

- Screens - Live In London (2017)

DVD

- Screens - Live In London (2017)
