= Louie Palmer =

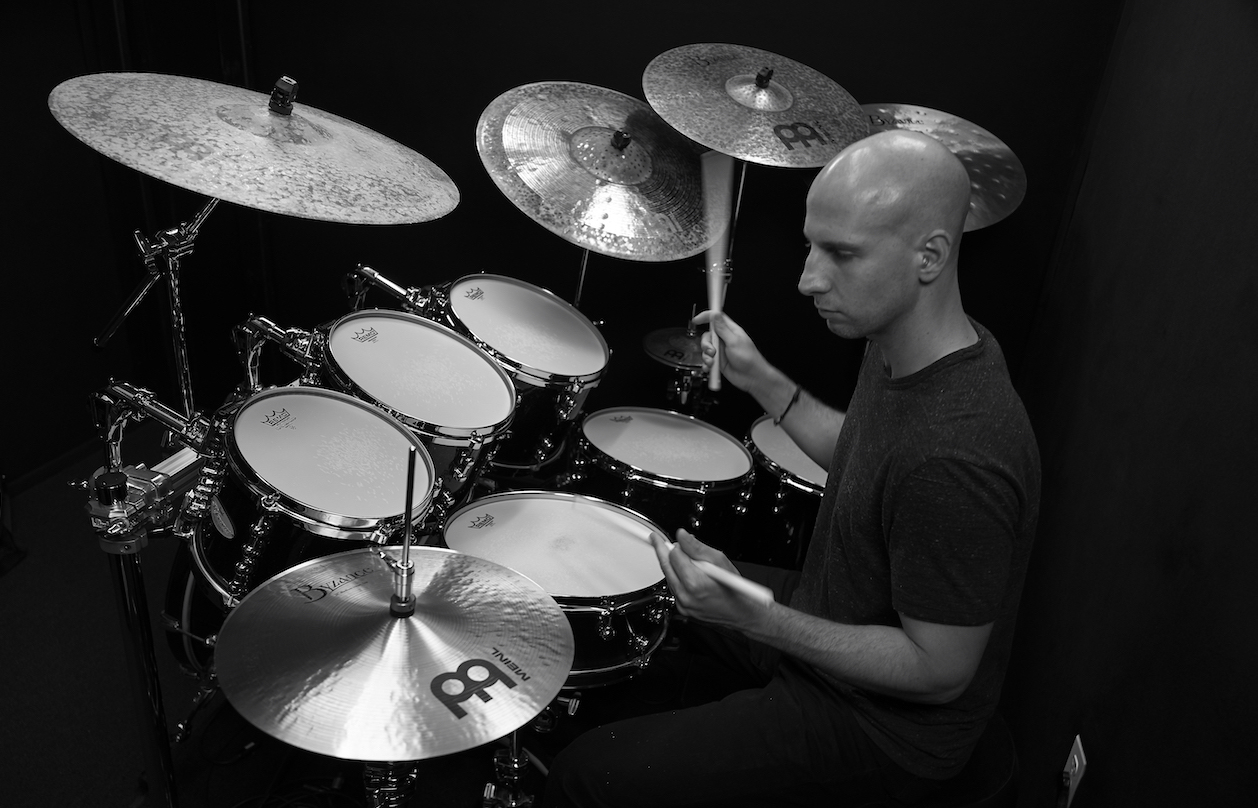

Background information
- Born: 22 November 1985 (age 40)
- Origin: London, England
- Genres: Jazz, rock
- Occupation: Musician
- Instrument: Drums
- Years active: 2003–present
- Website: Official website

Louie Palmer (born 22 November 1985) is an English drummer and session musician.

== Biography ==
Palmer began playing the drums at five, learning drumming from his father. He played drums in school jazz orchestras and received an endorsement from Zildjian at age 17. He performed at various drum clinic events with former Style Council drummer Steve White.

In 2004, Palmer moved to Boston to study drumming at the Berklee College of Music. After returning to the UK, he played with former Sting sideman Jason Rebello, Gary Husband and Laurence Cottle.

Palmer has also studied with Thomas Lang, Dave Weckl, Peter Erskine and Virgil Donati. He returned to the US in 2013 to play with US Jazz guitarist Mike Stern.

In 2014, he recorded with saxophonist Nelson Rangell with Mitchel Forman, Randy Brecker and Bob James.

Palmer currently resides in Los Angeles and runs his online drum school - playbetterdrums.com - in addition to recording and touring work.

In 2018, he performed at the Baked Potato for the first time as a leader with Mitch Forman, Luis Conte, Brandon Fields and Janek Gwizdala.

== 2021 Equipment ==
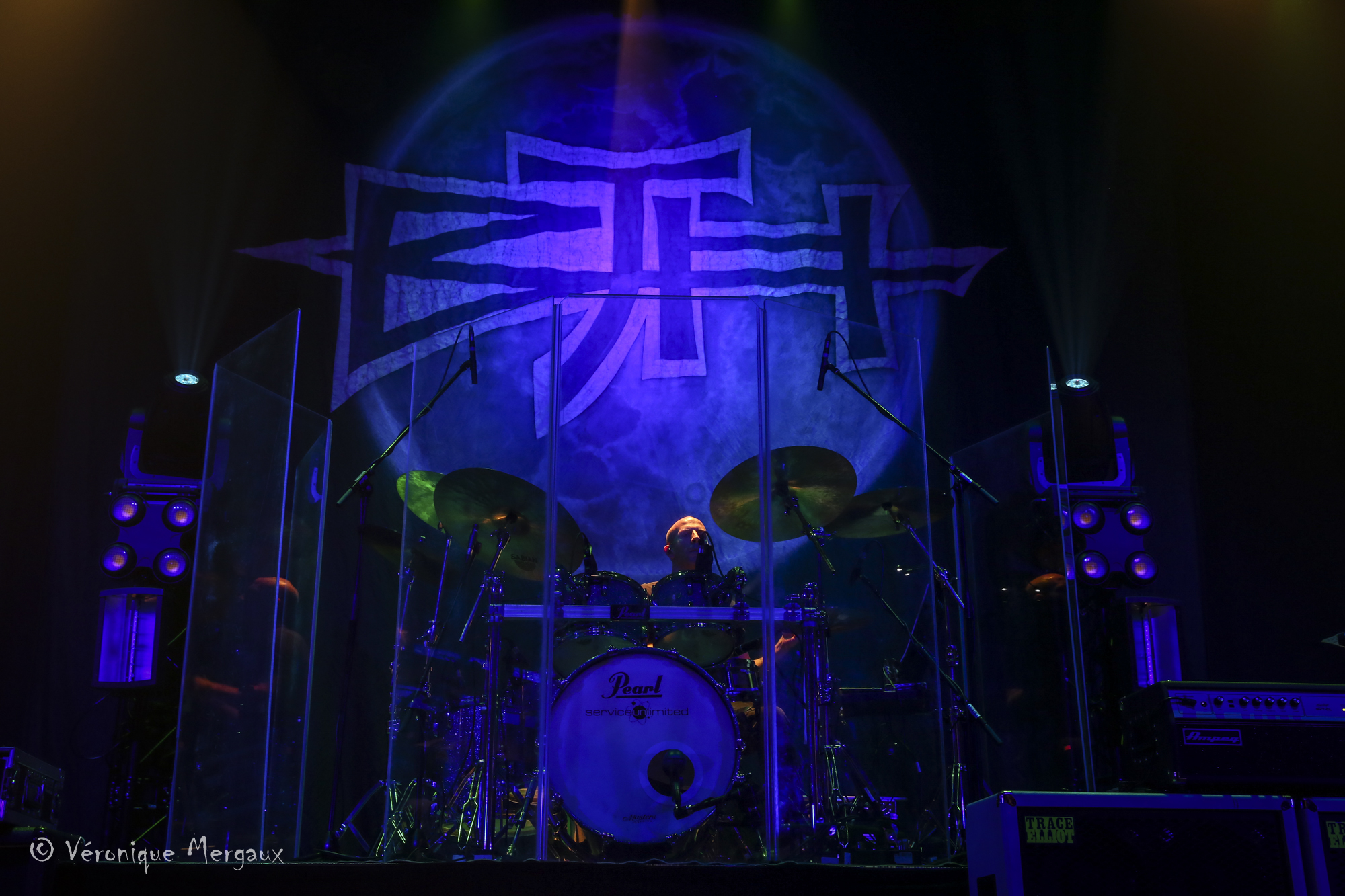
Palmer with Barclay James Harvest in 2018

Palmer endorses Pearl drums, Meinl cymbals, Pro Mark sticks, Evans drum heads, Alclair in-ears,Earthworks microphones. and Audimute.

=== Drums ===
Pearl Masterworks Studio Drum Set (maple/gum shells)

- 1× 22″ × 16″ Bass Drum
- 1× 18″ × 14″ Bass Drum
- 1× 10″ × 7″ Tom
- 1× 12″ × 8″ Tom
- 1× 13″ × 9″ Tom
- 1× 14″ × 14″ Floor Tom
- 1× 16″ × 16″ Floor Tom
- 1× 14″ × 5.5″ Snare Drum

=== Cymbals ===
- 14" Byzance Traditional Medium bottom over Extra Dry bottom
- 20" Byzance Vintage Pure Crash
- 23" Byzance Traditional Medium Ride
- 20" Byzance Dark Crash
- 20" Byzance Vintage Crash
- 22" Byzance Jazz China Ride

=== Drumheads ===
- Evans UV1 on Snare Drums & Toms
- Evans UV1 or G1 on Bass Drum

=== Sticks ===
- Pro Mark 'Bob Gatzen' signature stick

=== Microphones ===
Earthworks

- DM20 on toms and snare
- SR25 as overheads
- SR20LS for bass drum
- 2x TC20 for room mics

=== Studio Acoustics ===
Audimute (Custom Drum Studio Design)

- Audimute Strata Cityscape
- Audimute AcoustiStone - Nero Marquina - Offset w LED
- Audimute AcoustiColor Acoustic Panels - 2’x4’x1.5”
- Audimute Acoustic Image Panels

== Discography ==
- Time of Spring by Baki Duyarlar (2011)
- MW Trio by Marcus Wolf (2014)
- Red by Nelson Rangell (2014)
- Blue by Nelson Rangell (2014)
- Salvation by Malcolm Bruce (2017)
- A Lifetime Away by Ruslan Sirota (2017)
- Me and My Radio by Anthony Strong (2019)
- Light by Nelson Rangell (2019)
