= Katatonia discography =

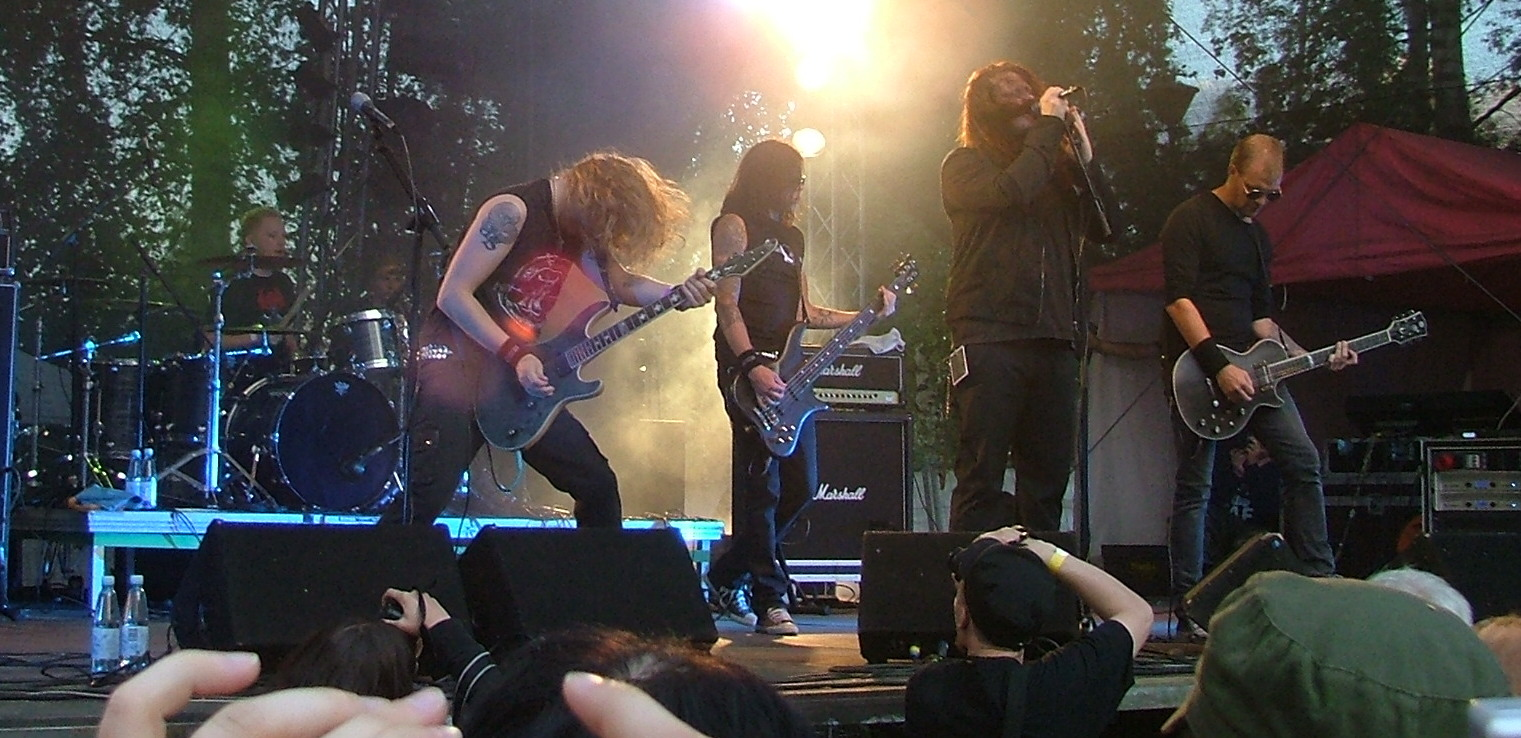
Katatonia performing in 2008

This is the discography for the Swedish heavy metal band Katatonia.

== Albums ==
=== Studio albums ===
| Title | Album details | Peak chart positions | | | | | | | | | |
| Title | Album details | SWE | AUT | FIN | FRA | GER | NLD | NOR | SWI | UK | US |
|---|---|---|---|---|---|---|---|---|---|---|---|
| Dance of December Souls | Released: 14 December 1993; Label: No Fashion; Formats: CD, CS, LP, DL | — | — | — | — | — | — | — | — | — | — |
| Brave Murder Day | Released: 1996; Label: Avantgarde Music; Formats: CD, CS, LP, DL | — | — | — | — | — | — | — | — | — | — |
| Discouraged Ones | Released: 27 April 1998; Label: Avantgarde Music; Formats: CD, CS, LP, DL | — | — | — | — | — | — | — | — | — | — |
| Tonight's Decision | Released: 31 August 1999; Label: Peaceville Records; Formats: CD, CS, LP, DL | — | — | — | — | — | — | — | — | — | — |
| Last Fair Deal Gone Down | Released: 8 May 2001; Label: Peaceville; Formats: CD, CS, LP, DL | — | — | — | — | — | — | — | — | — | — |
| Viva Emptiness | Released: 24 March 2003; Label: Peaceville; Formats: CD, LP, DL | — | — | 17 | — | — | — | — | — | — | — |
| The Great Cold Distance | Released: 13 March 2006; Label: Peaceville; Formats: CD, LP, DL | 42 | — | 8 | — | — | — | — | — | — | — |
| Night Is the New Day | Released: 2 November 2009; Label: Peaceville; Formats: CD, LP, DL | 39 | — | 8 | 141 | 77 | — | — | — | — | — |
| Dead End Kings | Released: 27 August 2012; Label: Peaceville; Formats: CD, CD+DVD, LP, DL | 12 | 25 | 4 | 88 | 21 | 60 | 17 | 46 | 142 | 138 |
| The Fall of Hearts | Released: 20 May 2016; Label: Peaceville; Formats: CD, CD+DVD, LP, DL | 31 | 28 | 6 | 144 | 11 | 42 | — | 48 | 70 | 188 |
| City Burials | Released: 24 April 2020; Label: Peaceville; Formats: CD, DL | — | 10 | 5 | — | 6 | 41 | — | 12 | — | — |
| Sky Void of Stars | Released: 20 January 2023; Label: Napalm; Formats: CD, CD+BD, LP | — | 13 | 5 | 193 | 5 | 43 | — | 3 | — | — |
| Nightmares as Extensions of the Waking State | Released: 6 June 2025; Label: Napalm; Formats: CD, CD+BD, LP | — | 10 | 21 | — | 10 | — | — | 21 | — | — |
"—" denotes a recording that did not chart or was not released in that territory.

=== Remix albums ===
| Title | Album details | Peak chart positions | | |
| Title | Album details | FIN | GER | UK |
|---|---|---|---|---|
| Dethroned & Uncrowned | Released: 9 September 2013; Label: Kscope Music; Formats: CD, CD+DVD, LP, DL | 33 | 91 | 136 |

=== Live albums ===
| Title | Album details | Peak chart positions |
| Title | Album details | FIN |
|---|---|---|
| Live Consternation | Released: 28 May 2007; Label: Peaceville; Formats: CD, CD+DVD, DL | — |
| Last Fair Day Gone Night | Released: 17 June 2013; Label: Peaceville; Formats: CD+DVD, LP, DL | 49 |
| Sanctitude | Release: 30 March 2015; Label: Kscope Music; Formats: BR, CD+DVD, LP, DL | 48 |
| The Great Cold Distance Live in Bulgaria with the Orchestra of State Opera - Plovdiv | Release: 2017; Label: Peaceville; Formats: LP | — |
| Dead Air | Released: 13 November 2020; Label: Peaceville; Formats: CD+DVD, LP | 47 |
"—" denotes a recording that did not chart or was not released in that territory.

=== Compilation albums ===
| Title | Album details | Peak chart positions |
| Title | Album details | SWI |
|---|---|---|
| Brave Yester Days | Released: 28 April 2004; Label: Avantgarde Music; Formats: CD | — |
| The Black Sessions | Released: 21 February 2005; Label: Peaceville; Formats: CD+DVD | — |
| Introducing Katatonia | Released: 26 April 2013; Label: Recall; Formats: CD, DL | — |
| Kocytean | Released: 19 April 2014; Label: Peaceville; Formats: LP | — |
| Mnemosynean | Released: 1 October 2021; Label: Peaceville; Formats: CD, LP | 99 |

=== Demos ===
| Title | Demo details |
|---|---|
| Rehearsal '91 | Released: 1991; Label: Self-released; Formats: CS |
| Rehearsal '92 | Released: October 1992; Label: Self-released; Formats: CS |
| Jhva Elohim Meth | Released: 1992; Label: Self-released; Formats: CS |

=== Split albums ===
| Title | Album details | Notes |
|---|---|---|
| Katatonia / Primordial | Released: 1996; Label: Misanthropy; Formats: LP | split with Primordial |
| Katatonia / Hades | Released: October 1996; Label: Mystic Production; Formats: CD | split with Hades |

== EPs ==
| Title | EP details |
|---|---|
| Jhva Elohim Meth... The Revival | Released: 1992; Label: VIC; Formats: CD, CS |
| For Funerals to Come... | Released: 1995; Label: Avantgarde Music; Formats: CD, CS, LP, DL |
| Sounds of Decay | Released: 8 December 1997; Label: Avantgarde Music; Formats: CD, LP |
| Saw You Drown | Released: 1 January 1998; Label: Avantgarde Music; Formats: CD, LP |
| Teargas EP | Released: 20 February 2001; Label: Peaceville; Formats: CD |
| Tonight's Music | Released: 26 November 2001; Label: Peaceville; Formats: CD |
| July | Released: 26 March 2007; Label: Peaceville; Formats: CD |
| The Longest Year | Released: 15 March 2010; Label: Peaceville; Formats: CD, DL |

== Singles ==
| Title | Year | Peak chart positions | | | Album |
| Title | Year | DEN | FIN | FRA | Album |
|---|---|---|---|---|---|
| "Ghost of the Sun" | 2003 | — | — | — | Viva Emptiness |
| "My Twin" | 2006 | 20 | 9 | — | The Great Cold Distance |
| "Deliberation" | 2006 | — | — | — | The Great Cold Distance |
| "July" | 2007 | — | — | — | The Great Cold Distance |
| "Day and Then the Shade" | 2009 | — | — | — | Night Is the New Day |
| "The Longest Year" | 2010 | — | — | 90 | Night Is the New Day |
| "Buildings" | 2012 | — | — | — | Dead End Kings |
| "Lethean" | 2012 | — | — | — | Dead End Kings |
| "Old Heart Falls" | 2016 | — | — | — | The Fall of Hearts |
| "Serein" | 2016 | — | — | — | The Fall of Hearts |
| "Shifts" | 2016 | — | — | — | The Fall of Hearts |
| "Lacquer" | 2020 | — | — | — | City Burials |
| "Behind the Blood" | 2020 | — | — | — | City Burials |
| "The Winter of Our Passing" | 2020 | — | — | — | City Burials |
| "Atrium" | 2022 | — | — | — | Sky Void Of Stars |
| "Austerity" | 2022 | — | — | — | Sky Void Of Stars |
| "Lilac" | 2025 | — | — | — | Nightmares as Extensions of the Waking State |
| "Temporal" | 2025 | — | — | — | Nightmares as Extensions of the Waking State |
| "Wind of No Change" | 2025 | — | — | — | Nightmares as Extensions of the Waking State |
| "A World Without Heroes" | 2025 | — | — | — | Non-album single |
"—" denotes a recording that did not chart or was not released in that territory.

== Music videos ==
- "Deliberation" (2006)
- "My Twin" (2006)
- "July" (2007)
- "Day and Then the Shade" (2009)
- "The Longest Year" (2010)
- "Lethean" (2013)
- "Shifts" (2016)
- "Behind the Blood" (2020)
- "The Winter of Our Passing" (2020)
- "Atrium" (2022)
- "Austerity" (2022)
- "Birds" (2023)
- "Opaline" (2023)
- "Lilac" (2025)
- "Wind Of No Change" (2025)
