= Kocytean =

EP by Katatonia
- Released: April 19, 2014
- Recorded: 2006–2012
- Studio: Various
- Length: 26:00
- Label: Peaceville

Katatonia chronology
Dead End Kings (2012)	Kocytean (2014)	The Fall of Hearts (2016)

Kocytean is the ninth EP by Swedish heavy metal band Katatonia. The album was released on April 19, 2014, as part of the 2014 iteration of Record Store Day. The release consists of a collection of six B-side songs from their prior three albums at the time – The Great Cold Distance (2006), Night is the New Day (2009), and Dead End Kings (2012). While given a limited release, it was still generally praised by critics.

== Background and release ==
The Kocytean EP was compiled and released for the 2014 iteration of Record Store Day, a yearly event where bands create a limited edition physical publication specifically for issue under a small business dedicated to releasing music. The releases consists of six tracks, featuring two B-side songs each from each of their last three studio albums at the time. The tracks "Unfurl" and "Code Against the Code" originate from The Great Cold Distance sessions, "Sold Heart" and "Ashen" originate from the Night is the New Day sessions," and "Second" and "The Act of Darkening" originate from the Dead End Kings sessions. The release features album artwork from Travis Smith, who had previously created cover art for the band. The EP was released just before the band embarked on the "Unplugged & Reworked Tour", which was in support of the just prior released Dethroned & Uncrowned – an acoustic re-recording of their ninth album Dead End Kings – something journalists felt Kocytean was an extension considering the more mellow nature of several of the EP's tracks.

== Critical reception ==
Professional ratings
Review scores
Source	Rating
Dead Press UK	9/10 stars
Ultimate Guitar	8/10 stars

The album was generally well received by critics. Dead Press UK praised the album's similar sound to Dethroned & Uncrowned, concluding that "Despite these tracks being taken from a whole host of Katatonia‘s previous albums, each one maintains the same spark of brilliance....it’s evident that a great deal of consideration goes into producing these highly intelligent and stirring songs. Whether you’re doing some soul searching or need a thought-provoking soundtrack to a gloomy winter day, Kocytean is a good place to start." The Ultimate Guitar staff review praised the lyrics and elaborate sound, concluding that "As the tracks are rare and B-sides you may already own several of them if you are a big fan of the band, and that may be discouraging, but I honestly feel like this is a worthwhile release."

== Track list ==
All lyrics are written by Jonas Renkse.

No.	Title	Length
1.	"Unfurl" (from The Great Cold Distance sessions)	4:46
2.	"Sold Heart" (from Night is the New Day sessions)	4:34
3.	"Ashen" (from Night is the New Day sessions)	4:09
4.	"Second" (from Dead End Kings sessions)	3:34
5.	"Code Against the Code" (from The Great Cold Distance sessions)	3:35
6.	"The Act of Darkening" (from Dead End Kings sessions)	5:55
Total length:		26:00

== Personnel ==
Band

- Jonas Renkse – vocals
- Anders Nyström – lead guitar
- Daniel Liljekvist – drums
- Fredrik Norrman – guitar (tracks 1–3, 5)
- Mattias Norrman – bass guitar (tracks 1–3, 5)
- Per Eriksson – guitar (tracks 4, 6)
- Niklas Sandin – bass guitar (tracks 4, 6)
