= The Black Sessions =

Compilation album by Katatonia
- Released: February 21, 2005
- Recorded: Discouraged Ones (Disc 1 & 2), Sunlight Studios, July–August 1997; Tonight's Decision, (Disc 1 & 2), Sunlight Studios, February–April 1999; Teargas EP / Last Fair Deal Gone Down / Tonight's Music (Disc 1 & 2), Sunlight Studios, April–November 2000; Viva Emptiness / Ghost of the Sun (Disc 1 & 2), 303 Studios, Stockholm & Studio Kuling, Örebro, October–November 2002; Disc 3, Kraków, April 2003
- Genres: Doom metal; gothic rock; alternative rock
- Length: 206:25 (3 hours, 26 minutes, 25 seconds)
- Label: Peaceville
- Producers: Katatonia on Teargas EP/Last Deal Gone Down/Tonight's Music & Viva Emptiness, Thomas Skogsberg, Jocke Petterson

Katatonia chronology
Brave Yester Days (2004)	The Black Sessions (2005)	My Twin (2006)

The Black Sessions is the second compilation album by Swedish heavy metal band Katatonia, released on February 21, 2005, through Peaceville. The compilation includes hit songs, B-sides and rarities recorded on the band's previous studio albums (from Tonight's Decision to Viva Emptiness). A live DVD for the band performing in Kraków, Poland, in April 2003 is also included in the compilation.

The song "Wait Outside" is recorded during the Viva Emptiness recording session but previously unreleased anywhere. A remixed and remastered version of the song is included on the 10th anniversary edition of Viva Emptiness.

== Track listing ==
=== Disc one – CD ===
No.	Title	Album	Length
1.	"Teargas"	Teargas EP / Last Fair Deal Gone Down	3:32
2.	"Right into the Bliss"	Tonight's Decision	5:05
3.	"Criminals"	Viva Emptiness / Ghost of the Sun	3:47
4.	"Help Me Disappear"	Tonight's Music	5:14
5.	"Nerve"	Saw You Drown / Discouraged Ones	4:30
6.	"The Future of Speech"	Last Fair Deal Gone Down	5:39
7.	"Ghost of the Sun"	Viva Emptiness	4:07
8.	"I Am Nothing"	Tonight's Decision	4:37
9.	"Deadhouse"	Discouraged Ones	4:35
10.	"Passing Bird"	Last Fair Deal Gone Down	3:38
11.	"Sleeper"	Viva Emptiness	4:08
12.	"Sulfur"	Teargas	6:23
13.	"No Devotion"	Tonight's Decision	4:49
14.	"Chrome"	Last Fair Deal Gone Down	5:14
15.	"A Premonition"	Viva Emptiness	3:34

=== Disc two – CD ===
No.	Title	Album	Length
1.	"Dispossession"	Last Fair Deal Gone Down	5:37
2.	"Cold Ways"	Discouraged Ones	5:23
3.	"Nightmares by the Sea (Jeff Buckley cover)"	Tonight's Decision	4:16
4.	"O How I Enjoy the Light (Will Oldham cover)"	Tonight's Music	2:44
5.	"Evidence"	Viva Emptiness / Ghost of the Sun	4:36
6.	"March 4"	Teargas / Last Fair Deal Gone Down	3:53
7.	"I Break"	Discouraged Ones	4:22
8.	"For My Demons"	Tonight's Decision	5:43
9.	"Omerta"	Viva Emptiness	2:58
10.	"Tonight's Music"	Last Fair Deal Gone Down	4:20
11.	"Stalemate"	Discouraged Ones	4:19
12.	"Wait Outside"	The Black Sessions / Viva Emptiness (Reissue)	3:38
13.	"Fractured"	Tonight's Decision	5:52
14.	"Sweet Nurse"	Last Fair Deal Gone Down	3:56
15.	"Black Session"	Tonight's Decision	7:02

=== Disc three – DVD ===
No.	Title	Album	Length
1.	"Ghost of the Sun"	Viva Emptiness / Ghost of the Sun	5:28
2.	"Criminals"	Viva Emptiness / Ghost of the Sun	3:51
3.	"Teargas"	Teargas EP / Last Fair Deal Gone Down	3:17
4.	"I Break"	Discouraged Ones	4:14
5.	"I Am Nothing"	Tonight's Decision	4:36
6.	"Sweet Nurse"	Last Fair Deal Gone Down	4:07
7.	"Tonight's Music"	Last Fair Deal Gone Down / Tonight's Music	3:57
8.	"For My Demons"	Tonight's Decision	5:06
9.	"Chrome"	Last Fair Deal Gone Down	5:04
10.	"The Future of Speech"	Last Fair Deal Gone Down	5:16
11.	"Complicity"	Viva Emptiness	4:04
12.	"Burn the Remembrance"	Viva Emptiness	4:54
13.	"Evidence"	Viva Emptiness / Ghost of the Sun	5:08
14.	"Deadhouse"	Discouraged Ones	4:41
15.	"Murder"	Brave Murder Day	5:11

== Personnel ==
=== Katatonia ===
- Jonas Renkse – lead vocals, production on Disc 1 & 2, songwriting on all other tracks other than "Nightmares by the Sea", drums on Discouraged Ones, Disc 1 & 2, additional guitar, mixing & programming on Viva Emptiness on Disc 1 & 2
- Anders Nyström – lead guitar, production Disc 1 & 2, songwriting on Discouraged Ones & Tonight's Decision, music on Teargas EP / Last Deal Gone Down / Tonight's Music & Viva Emptiness, keyboards on Discouraged Ones, Tonight's Decision & Viva Emptiness, mellotron on Teargas EP / Last Deal Gone Down / Tonight's Music backing vocals, mixing & programming on Viva Emptiness Disc 1 & 2
- Fred Norrman – rhythm guitar on Disc 1–3, bass guitar on Tonight's Decision Disc 1 & 2), music on Teargas EP / Last Deal Gone Down / Tonight's Music, "A Premonition"
- Mattias Norrman – bass guitar on Last Fair Deal Gone Down & Viva Emptiness Disc 1 & 2, Disc 3
- Daniel Liljekvist – drums on Last Fair Deal Gone Down & Viva Emptiness Disc 1 & 2, Disc 3, backing vocals on track 7, Disc 1

=== Additional personnel ===
- Micke Oretoft – bass guitar and production on Discouraged Ones Disc 1 & 2
- David Castillo – remastering on Discouraged Ones Disc 1 & 2
- Fred Estby – engineering on Discouraged Ones Disc 1 & 2
- Tomas Skogsberg – engineering & mixing Discouraged Ones, Teargas EP & Last Fair Deal Gone Down Disc 1 & 2, engineering on Tonight's Music Disc 1 & 2
- Mikael Åkerfeldt – vocals production on Discouraged Ones & Tonight's Decision Disc 1 & 2
- Dan Swanö – drums on Tonight's Decision Disc 1 & 2 & editing on Viva Emptiness Disc 1 & 2
- Joakim Petterson – engineering on Tonight's Decision Disc 1 & 2
- Jonas Kjellgren – engineering on Tonight's Music Disc 1 & 2
- Mia Lorentzon – mastering on Tonight's Music Disc 1 & 2
- Peter in de Betou – mastering on Teargas EP, Viva Emptiness & Last Fair Deal Gone Down Disc 1 & 2, editing on Last Fair Deal Gone Down Disc 1 & 2
- Jocke Pettersson – mixing & engineering on Teargas EP / Last Fair Deal Gone Down / Tonight's Music Disc 1 & 2
- Ian Agate – assisting engineering on Viva Emptiness Disc 1 & 2
- Jens Bogren – mixing on Viva Emptiness Disc 1 & 2
- Jeff Buckley – songwriter on "Nightmares by the Sea"

== See also ==
- List of "Greatest Hits" albums
