= Live Consternation =

Live album by Katatonia
- Released: 28 May 2007
- Recorded: 17 August 2006
- Studio: Summer Breeze Open Air, Germany
- Genre: Hard rock, gothic rock, gothic metal
- Length: 51:51
- Label: Peaceville
- Director: Ronald Matthes
- Producer: Roaxfilms

Katatonia chronology
The Great Cold Distance (2006)	Live Consternation (2007)	Night Is the New Day (2009)

Professional ratings
Review scores
Source	Rating
About.com	3.5/5 stars
AllMusic	3.5/5 stars
Exclaim!	(favorable)

Live Consternation is the first live album and video by Swedish heavy metal band Katatonia, released in both CD and DVD format through Peaceville Records on 28 May 2007. The double album features a live performance recorded at Germany's Summer Breeze Open Air festival, on 17 August 2006. The artwork was designed by Travis Smith and is close to the visual concept for The Great Cold Distance.

== Track listing ==
All songs written and composed by Jonas Renkse, Anders Nyström and Fredrik Norrman.

1. "Leaders" – 5:11
2. "Wealth" – 4:48
3. "Soil's Song" – 4:15
4. "Had To (Leave)" – 4:53
5. "Cold Ways" – 5:23
6. "Right into the Bliss" – 5:20
7. "Ghost of the Sun" – 4:07
8. "Criminals" – 4:03
9. "Deliberation" – 4:05
10. "July" – 4:42
11. "Evidence" – 5:01

Notes

- Tracks 1, 3, 9 & 10 from The Great Cold Distance
- Tracks 2, 7, 8 & 11 from Viva Emptiness
- Tracks 4 & 6 from Tonight's Decision
- Track 5 from Discouraged Ones

== Personnel ==
Band

- Jonas Renkse – vocals
- Anders Nyström – guitar, backing vocals
- Fredrik Norrman – guitar
- Mattias Norrman – bass
- Daniel Liljekvist – drums

Production

- Travis Smith – art director, artwork, designer
- Petri Eskelinen – photography
- Ronald Matthes – director, executive producer
- Erik Fugmann-Brandt – editor
- Roaxfilms – producer
- Kaja Kargus – executive producer
- David Castillo – mixing engineer, mastering engineer
