= Brave Yester Days =

Greatest hits album by Katatonia
- Released: 28 April 2004
- Recorded: July 1992 – August 1997
- Genre: Progressive metal Death/doom; Alternative metal
- Length: 130:18
- Label: Avantgarde
- Producer: Katatonia

Professional ratings
Review scores
Source	Rating
AllMusic	4.5/5 stars

Brave Yester Days is the first compilation album by Swedish heavy metal band Katatonia. It contains the material from Katatonia's older era, mainly consisting of death/doom material, and a few alternative rock songs.

"Black Erotica" is an earlier version of "12" from Brave Murder Day and "Untrue" is a previously unreleased song from the Sounds of Decay sessions.

== Reception ==
Eduardo Rivadavia from AllMusic said that the compilation displays "Katatonia's gradual shift away from their doom/death origins" to a sound featuring "lighter guitars, incremental keyboards, and the replacement of deathly growls with clean-sung, melodic vocals" and called the album "an astoundingly well-conceived summary of Katatonia's purely metallic career" and "a frankly unbeatable bang-for-buck proposition when it comes to housing so many scattered releases under one roof."

== Track listing ==
Disc 1
No.	Title	Album	Length
1.	"Midwinter Gates (Prologue)"	Jhva Elohim Meth
2.	"Without God"	Jhva Elohim Meth
3.	"Palace of Frost"	Jhva Elohim Meth
4.	"The Northern Silence"	Jhva Elohim Meth
5.	"Crimson Tears (Epilogue)"	Jhva Elohim Meth
6.	"Gateways of Bereavement"	Dance of December Souls
7.	"Velvet Thorns (of Drynwhyl)"	Dance of December Souls
8.	"Black Erotica"	W.A.R. Compilation Vol. 1
9.	"Love of the Swan"	W.A.R. Compilation Vol. 1
10.	"Funeral Wedding"	For Funerals to Come...
11.	"Shades of Emerald Fields"	For Funerals to Come...
12.	"For Funerals to Come"	For Funerals to Come...
13.	"Epistel"	For Funerals to Come...

Disc 2
No.	Title	Album	Length
1.	"Murder"	Brave Murder Day	4:54
2.	"Rainroom"	Brave Murder Day	6:31
3.	"Nowhere"	Sounds of Decay	6:08
4.	"At Last"	Sounds of Decay	6:13
5.	"Inside the Fall"	Sounds of Decay	6:20
6.	"Untrue"	Brave Yester Days	2:34
7.	"Nerve"	Saw You Drown	4:30
8.	"Saw You Drown"	Saw You Drown	5:01
9.	"Quiet World"	Saw You Drown	4:37
10.	"Scarlet Heavens"	Katatonia / Primordial	10:24

== Credits ==
Katatonia

- Lord Seth (on Jhva Elohim Meth) / Lord J. Renkse (on Dance of December Souls) (Jonas Renkse) – drums, clean vocals, lyrics & screaming
- Blackheim (Anders Nyström) – lead guitar, music, guitar (on Jhva Elohim Meth & Dance of December Souls), bass (on Jhva Elohim Meth & Brave Murder Day) & backing vocals (on For Funerals to Come...)
- Day Disyhrah (Dan Swanö) – backing & clean vocals (on Jhva Elohim Meth & Dance of December Souls), electric keyboard & session musician
- Israphel Wing (Guillaume Le Huche) – bass (on Dance of December Souls, For Funerals to Come... & "Scarlet Heavens")
- Fredrik Norrman – music (on Brave Murder Day, Sounds of Decay & Saw You Drown) & rhythm guitar
- Mikael Åkerfeldt – death grunts & session musician
