= Travis Smith (artist) =

American artist (born 1970)

Smith's artwork for Nightmare was considered one of "hard rock's greatest album covers" for 2010 by Revolver.

Travis Smith (born February 26, 1970) is an American graphic artist best known for designing heavy metal album art. He has been called "renowned" by Alternative Press and "unquestionably one of the most talented graphic artists in metal today" by Chronicles of Chaos. Smith has done work for many established rock and metal bands, including Death, Devin Townsend, Dead Industry, Katatonia, Nevermore, Anathema, CKY, Soilwork, King Diamond, Novembre, Avenged Sevenfold, Strapping Young Lad, Persefone, Riverside, Overkill, and Opeth.

== History ==
Travis Smith was born on February 26, 1970, just outside San Diego, California. Growing up, Smith had no formal art education aside from a semester in high school. He got his start designing album covers for his friend's band, progressive metal group Psychotic Waltz. As of 2005, Smith has worked with nearly 100 bands. He currently resides in San Diego. When asked what his favorite artwork is at the time, Smith has responded: "Devin Townsend's Terria, Opeth's Blackwater Park, and Katatonia's Last Fair Deal Gone Down."

== Art ==
Smith's work base primarily consists of album art for metal bands. Smith is known for a "dark and introspective" style that is largely photography-based, digitally composed with various other media. For example, in creating his art for Avenged Sevenfold's Nightmare (2010), Smith "did a few actual painted textures with acrylics and watercolor, scanned them, and blended them with the whole picture." For some specific parts, like the skull and the girl, Smith "would digitally paint over photos and blend them into their originals."

== List of works ==
Year	Album	Artist	Credit(s)
1998	Elements of Anger	Sadus	Artwork
1998	Eyesore	Skinlab	Artwork, cover typeset
1998	Firestarter (Century Black compilation)	Various artists	Artwork, design
1998	Identity Four (Century Media compilation)	Various artists	Artwork
1998	Something Wicked This Way Comes	Iced Earth	Artwork
1998	The Sound of Perseverance	Death	Artwork
1999	Adagio	Solitude Aeturnus	Artwork, design
1999	Alive in Athens	Iced Earth	Artwork
1999	Demons and Wizards	Demons and Wizards	Artwork, design, layout design, logo
1999	Disembody: The New Flesh	Skinlab	Artwork, design
1999	Dreaming Neon Black	Nevermore	Design, photography, illustrations
1999	The Fragile Art of Existence	Control Denied	Design
1999	Necroshine	Overkill	Artwork
1999	Still Life	Opeth	Photography, booklet design
1999	Tonight's Decision	Katatonia	Design, layout design, illustrations
2000	Black Emotions	Beseech	Cover art
2000	Bloodletting	Overkill	Design, illustrations, layout concept
2000	Dead Heart in a Dead World	Nevermore	Design, illustrations, layout coordinator
2000	Identity 6 (Century Media compilation)	Various artists	Artwork
2000	Kings of the World	CJSS	Cover art
2000	Lightbringer	Power Symphony	Illustrations
2000	Manifestation	Malevolent Creation	Design, illustrations
2000	Only Law Is Survival	Hate Plow	Cover art
2000	Thane to the Throne	Jag Panzer	Cover art
2001	Blackwater Park	Opeth	Design, cover design
2001	Dark Genesis	Iced Earth	Artwork, design, layout design
2001	Death's Design	Diabolical Masquerade	Art direction, design
2001	Horror Show	Iced Earth	Layout design, illustrations
2001	Identity 7: Deadly Sins (Century Media compilation)	Various artists	Artwork
2001	Into the Deepest Wounds	Withered Earth	Layout design
2001	Last Fair Deal Gone Down	Katatonia	Design, photography
2001	Mechanized Warfare	Jag Panzer	Artwork
2001	Novembrine Waltz	Novembre	Cover art, Art direction, Layout design, Illustrations
2001	Praying, Hoping, Nothing	December	Artwork, art direction, design, cover art concept, layout design
2001	Profoundemonium	Trail of Tears	Layout design, cover design
2001	Rapture	Dragonlord	Art direction, design, layout design, illustrations
2001	Resonance	Anathema	Sleeve art
2001	Tonight's Music	Katatonia	Photography and design
2001	Sweet Home Transylvania	The Bronx Casket Co.	Images, image design
2001	Terria	Devin Townsend	Design, layout design, illustrations
2001	The Towers of Avarice	Zero Hour	Arranger, producer, design, layout design, illustrations
2001	Winds Blow Higher	Sleepless	Design, cover art
2002	Abigail II: The Revenge	King Diamond	Artwork
2002	Conceived in Fire	Living Sacrifice	Artwork
2002	Deadsoul Tribe	Deadsoul Tribe	Design, layout design, illustrations
2002	Deliverance	Opeth	Design, photography, execution
2002	Despise the Sun	Suffocation	Artwork, cover art concept
2002	Envenomed II	Malevolent Creation	Cover art
2002	Forgiving Eden	A Triggering Myth	Design, illustrations
2002	Karma in Black	The Defaced	Cover art
2002	Natural Born Chaos	Soilwork	Artwork, layout design
2002	No Reply	Daylight Dies	Photography, layout design
2002	Reflections of the I	Winds	Design, layout design
2002	Resonance 2	Anathema	Sleeve art
2002	Resurrection Through Carnage	Bloodbath	Digital editing, design
2002	Souls Highway	Beseech	Cover art
2002	This Is My Blood	Soul Embraced	Paintings
2002	To Welcome the Fade	Novembers Doom	Artwork
2002	Tribute to the Gods	Iced Earth	Artwork, design, layout design
2002	Trinity	Prototype	Artwork, package design, layout design
2002	The Will to Kill	Malevolent Creation	Artwork
2002	Words as Carriers	Matt Zane	Artwork, layout design
2002	Wrecking Everything	Overkill	Design
2003	Accelerated Evolution	The Devin Townsend Band	Graphic design, layout design
2003	Damnation	Opeth	Cover design, booklet design
2003	Emergent	Gordian Knot	Visuals
2003	Enemies of Reality	Nevermore	Artwork, layout design
2003	Exit Through Fear	Society 1	Artwork
2003	Fall, I Will Follow	Lacrimas Profundere	Photography, layout design
2003	The Glorious Burden	Iced Earth	Layout design
2003	Identity Eight (Century Media compilation)	Various artists	Artwork
2003	Keepers of Jericho: A Tribute to Helloween, Pt. II	Various artists	Cover art
2003	Killbox 13	Overkill	Design, layout design
2003	Labyrinth	Labyrinth	Artwork
2003	Metamorphosis	Zero Hour	Illustrations
2003	A Murder of Crows	Deadsoul Tribe	Design, layout design, illustrations
2003	The Puppet Master	King Diamond	Artwork
2003	Redemption	Redemption	Artwork, layout design
2003	Summoning	Twelfth Gate	Artwork, logo
2003	Strapping Young Lad	Strapping Young Lad	Visuals
2003	Viva Emptiness	Katatonia	Art direction, design
2003	Where Lovers Mourn	Draconian	Layout design, cover art
2004	Acceleration	Age of Silence	Artwork, graphic design, photography, layout design
2004	Delores Lesion	Lilitu	Art direction, design, photography, illustration concept
2004	Feel. Melt. Release. Escape.	Anti-Depressive Delivery	Illustrations
2004	Glow	Unjust	Logo
2004	Gone Forever	God Forbid	Concept, illustrations, logo
2004	The Imaginary Direction of Time	Winds	Graphic design, images
2004	In an Outrage	Chastain	Cover art
2004	diEversity	Entwine	Cover art and design
2004	Insect Song (album)	Beyond the Embrace	Artwork
2004	The January Tree	Deadsoul Tribe	Layout design, cover photo
2004	A Natural Disaster	Anathema	Producer
2004	Of Malice and the Magnum Heart	Misery Signals	Illustrations
2004	Out of Myself	Riverside	Design, layout design, illustrations
2004	Temporary Psychotic State	Subterranean Masquerade	Layout design, illustrations
2004	Twice Second	Symphorce	Artwork
2005	Alien	Strapping Young Lad	Art consultant
2005	Arcane Rain Fell	Draconian	Layout design, cover art
2005	The Black Sessions	Katatonia	Design, layout design
2005	Ghost Reveries	Opeth	Art direction, layout design, illustrations
2005	Immersed	Sinai Beach	Artwork
2005	ReliXIV	Overkill	Layout design, cover art
2005	Torn Between Dimensions	At War with Self	Layout design, illustrations
2006	Eclipse	Amorphis	Artwork
2006	The Great Cold Distance	Katatonia	Art Direction, Design
2006	Materia	Novembre	Cover art, art direction, Layout design, Illustrations
2006	Opeth Collecter's Edition Slipcase	Opeth	Design, photography, cover design, images, booklet design, execution
2006	The Fall of Ideals	All That Remains	Cover art
2006	Alone	Solitude Aeturnus	Cover art
2006	The New Black	Strapping Young Lad	Artwork and photography
2007	The Blue	Novembre	Cover art, art direction, Layout design, Illustrations
2007	Live Consternation	Katatonia	Artwork
2007	Ziltoid the Omniscient	Devin Townsend	Artwork
2007	Viides Luku – Hävitetty	Moonsorrow	Artwork, Layout
2007	Silent Waters	Amorphis	Artwork
2008	Cynic Paradise	Pain	Cover art
2008	Godspeed on the Devil's Thunder	Cradle of Filth	Design producer
2008	The Wacken Carnage	Bloodbath	Artwork, art direction, design
2008	Watershed	Opeth	Cover design
2009	Addicted	Devin Townsend Project	Artwork
2009	Anno Domini High Definition	Riverside	Design, layout design, illustrations
2009	Bloodstained Endurance	Trail of Tears (band)	Artwork
2009	Carver City	CKY	Artwork
2009	Skyforger	Amorphis	Artwork
2009	The Cold	Flotsam and Jetsam	Cover art
2009	Night Is the New Day	Katatonia	Artwork
2009	Snowfall on Judgment Day	Redemption	Artwork
2010	Monolith	In Mourning	Artwork
2010	Curse of the Red River	Barren Earth	Design, cover art
2010	Everything Remains as It Never Was	Eluveitie	Artwork, cover photo, back cover photo
2010	The Evolution of Chaos	Heathen	Artwork, package design, layout
2010	Ironbound	Overkill	Cover design, layout
2010	The Obsidian Conspiracy	Nevermore	Cover art
2010	Omen	Soulfly	Layout
2010	For We Are Many	All That Remains	Cover design
2010	Monuments	Northern Oak	Cover design
2010	Nightmare	Avenged Sevenfold	Cover design, tray card art
2010	A Thin Shell	October Tide	Artwork and layout
2011	Heritage	Opeth	Cover illustration
2011	The Beginning of Times	Amorphis	Illustrations
2011	Bloodbath over Bloodstock	Bloodbath	Illustrations and layout
2011	The Sound of Perseverance (reissue)	Death	Illustration
2011	Night Is the New Day (reissue)	Katatonia	Illustration
2011	Last Fair Deal Gone Down (reissue)	Katatonia	Illustration
2012	Dead End Kings	Katatonia	Artwork and design
2012	Throes of Absoluton	7 Horns 7 Eyes	Artwork
2012	The Electric Age	Overkill	Cover art and layout
2013	The Complete Works	Strapping Young Lad	Cover art and design
2013	Whole	SOiL	Cover art and design
2013	Shrine of New Generation Slaves	Riverside	Artwork
2013	Mythos	Soul Embraced	Artwork
2013	Acoustified!	Deron Miller	Artwork
2013	Ghost Thief	Living Sacrifice	Artwork
2014	Casualties of Cool	Casualties of Cool	Artwork
2014	Pale Communion	Opeth	Artwork and design
2014	White Devil Armory	Overkill	Cover art and layout
2015	Love, Fear and the Time Machine	Riverside	Artwork
2015	A Dream in Static	Earthside	Artwork
2016	Sorceress	Opeth	Artwork
2016	Selves We Cannot Forgive	Black Crown Initiate	Artwork
2017	Aathma	Persefone	Artwork
2017	The Grinding Wheel	Overkill	Cover art and layout
2018	Garden of the Titans: Live at Red Rocks Amphitheater	Opeth	Artwork
2018	Shadow Work	Warrel Dane	Artwork
2018	Wasteland	Riverside	Artwork
2019	In Cauda Venenum	Opeth	Artwork
2019	The Wings of War	Overkill	Cover art and layout
2020	Redneck Vikings from Hell	Æther Realm	Artwork
2021	Paranoiattack	96 Bitter Beings	Artwork
2022	Black Bile	Sinnery	Design, layout design, illustrations
2023	Let The Truth Speak	Earthside	Artwork
2024	The Last Will and Testament	Opeth	Artwork
2025	Floodgate	Imminent Sonic Destruction	Artwork
2025	Frozen Heart ~ Burning World	Earthside	Artwork
