= The Longest Year =

EP by Katatonia
- Released: 15 March 2010
- Recorded: July–August 2009
- Studio: Ghost Ward, Stockholm
- Length: 26:43
- Label: Peaceville
- Producer: Anders Nyström; Jonas Renkse

Katatonia chronology
Night is the New Day (2009)	The Longest Year (2010)	Dead End Kings (2012)

The Longest Year is the eighth EP by Swedish heavy metal band Katatonia, released in 2010 by Peaceville Records.

== Background ==
The EP features the title track originally released on Katatonia's eighth studio album Night Is the New Day, and the previously unreleased track "Sold Heart". The videos for "The Longest Year" and "Day & Then the Shade" were directed by Charlie Granberg and Lasse Hoile, respectively. The versions of "Day & Then the Shade" and "Idle Blood" are remixed versions of songs that previously appeared on their full-length album preceding this release, Night is the New Day.

== Track listing ==
All tracks are written by Jonas Renkse, except where noted.

The Longest Year track listing
No.	Title	Writer(s)	Length
1.	"The Longest Year"		4:42
2.	"Sold Heart"		4:31
3.	"Day & Then the Shade" (Frank Default remix)		5:35
4.	"Idle Blood" (Linje 14)	Anders Nyström	3:23
5.	"The Longest Year" (video))		4:06
6.	"Day and Then the Shade" (video)		4:26
