= Sky Void of Stars =

Studio album by Katatonia
- Released: 20 January 2023
- Recorded: 2020–2022
- Genre: Progressive rock; progressive metal
- Length: 45:47
- Label: Napalm

Katatonia chronology
City Burials (2020)	Sky Void of Stars (2023)	Nightmares as Extensions of the Waking State (2025)

Singles from Sky Void of Stars
- 1. "Atrium" Released: 20 October 2022; 2. "Austerity" Released: 2 December 2022

Sky Void of Stars is the twelfth studio album by Swedish heavy metal band Katatonia. It was released on 20 January 2023 and was generally well received by critics.

== Background ==
In April 2020, Katatonia released their eleventh studio album, City Burials. The band had initially planned on touring in support of the album, but the breakout of the COVID-19 pandemic halted all plans. Upon realizing that this was not a short-term issue, but something that was going to be completely halting their ability to tour, they instead turned to releasing further music. These plans including releasing a new live album Dead Air (2020), a compilation album Mnemosynean (2021), a box set Melancholium (2022), and forging ahead into writing and recording a twelfth studio album.

== Writing and recording ==
Work on the album started shortly after the April 2020 release of City Burials. While most Katatonia albums were written as a collaboration between vocalist Jonas Renkse and Anders Nyström, the album, like its predecessor, was written entirely by Renkse. The album is not directly about the COVID pandemic, but rather, the writing sessions acted as a sort of therapy to help Renkse maintain his mental health while living through it. The album's title, Sky Void of Stars, alludes to the centuries old concept that travelers sailing ocean couldn't travel when there aren't any stars lighting the sky and environment; a metaphor of sorts to how they felt "frozen" and "crippled" as a band with an unclear path forward while enduring the COVID pandemic. The title is taken from the lyrics of the track "Author".

The song "Colossal Shade" was inspired by Lick It Up-era of music from the band Kiss; the track was an effort to implement guitar riffs like those found on the respective Kiss album and mold them into Katatonia's own sound. The track "Opaline" was similarly influenced by the music of the Swedish pop rock band Kent in an effort to meld their sound into Katatonia's sound. The main guitar riff for the track "Birds" was originally rejected by Renkse for too closely resembling something from the gothic metal band Paradise Lost, but he later reversed the decision, feeling it was appropriate to use as a bit of a homage to the band. Joel Ekelof of the Swedish progressive metal band Soen recorded vocals for the song "Impermanence. Ekelof and Renkse had intended to collaborate for quite some time, but hadn't found the right way to do it.

Jacob Hansen returned from the City Burial sessions again to mix and master the album, and this time extending his help into the area of music production as well. The album was described as more guitar driven than their prior album, City Burials.

According to a 2025 interview between Terra Relicta and Moilanen, it was revealed that Nyström was uninvolved in the recording process for City Burials and Sky Void of Stars.

== Release and promotion ==
The album's name, Sky Void of Stars, and release date, 20 January 2023, was announced on 26 October 2022. The album was also announced to be their first to be released on record label Napalm Records. The first single, "Atrium" was also released at the time of the announcement in October, while a second single, "Austerity" was released ahead of the album on 2 December 2022. A European and Latin American tour in support of the album is scheduled for early 2023. Napalm Records sold a limited edition cd/blu-ray box containing a Dolby Atmos mix of the entire album, created from session stems and mixed by Bruce Soord of The Pineapple Thief. This mix is also available streaming on Apple Music.

== Reception ==
Sky Void of Stars was generally well-received by music critics. Metal Hammer praised the album for its combination and variety of rock and metal elements, concluding that "The only predictable thing about Sky Void Of Stars is how absurdly fucking great it is." Metal Injection concluded that "If you evaluate each song individually on their musical merits, they are all excellent. But what Katatonia has always been able to do, and what they've done again on Sky Void of Stars, is to also build an emotional connection and resonance in their songs that has an exponential effect, making for a sum greater than its parts." Blabbermouth, alluding to the band's transitions through various genre over their career, noted that "Sky Void of Stars is the embodiment of a band that no matter the change in presentation, is still the darkest and most varied in metal. Sputnik Music's staff review praised the album for " manag[ing] to recapture the essence that made them sovereigns of the progressive metal scene, marrying the gloom wizardry they unearthed at the turn of the new millennium with the soothing wisdom that emanates from their latest compositions."

== Track listing ==
All tracks are written by Jonas Renkse.

Sky Void of Stars track listing
No.	Title	Length
1.	"Austerity"	3:41
2.	"Colossal Shade"	4:29
3.	"Opaline"	5:00
4.	"Birds"	4:08
5.	"Drab Moon"	3:59
6.	"Author"	4:17
7.	"Impermanence" (featuring Joel Ekelof)	5:12
8.	"Sclera"	4:45
9.	"Atrium"	4:08
10.	"No Beacon to Illuminate Our Fall"	6:08
Total length:		45:47

Digital and limited edition CD bonus track
No.	Title	Length
11.	"Absconder"	4:47
Total length:		50:34

== Personnel ==
Katatonia

- Jonas Renkse – lead vocals, production, art direction
- Anders Nyström – guitars, production, art direction
- Roger Öjersson – guitars
- Niklas Sandin – bass
- Daniel Moilanen – drums

== Charts ==
Chart performance for Sky Void of Stars
Chart (2023)	Peak position
Austrian Albums (Ö3 Austria)	13
Belgian Albums (Ultratop Flanders)	48
Belgian Albums (Ultratop Wallonia)	140
Dutch Albums (Album Top 100)	43
Finnish Albums (Suomen virallinen lista)	5
French Albums (SNEP)	193
German Albums (Offizielle Top 100)	5
Scottish Albums (OCC)	26
Swiss Albums (Schweizer Hitparade)	3
UK Independent Albums (OCC)	8
UK Rock & Metal Albums (OCC)	5
