= Last Fair Deal Gone Down (album) =

Studio album by Katatonia
- Released: 8 May 2001
- Recorded: April–November 2000
- Studio: Sunlight Studio, Stockholm, Sweden
- Genre: Alternative rock
- Length: 50:39
- Label: Peaceville Records
- Producer: Katatonia

Katatonia chronology
Tonight's Decision (1999)	Last Fair Deal Gone Down (2001)	Viva Emptiness (2003)

Last Fair Deal Gone Down is the fifth studio album by Swedish heavy metal band Katatonia, released in 2001 by Peaceville Records. The release was the first of a series of four albums done by the band with a stable lineup of Jonas Renkse, Anders Nyström, Fredrik Norrman, Mattias Norrman, and Daniel Liljekvist, after years of lineup and role changes with prior albums.

== Background ==
After forming in the early 1990s, the band started off by released two albums of death/doom metal music with screamed vocals, Dance of December Souls and Brave Murder Day. Strains and health issues with Jonas Renkse's vocal cords, coupled with a desire to branch out musically and creatively, lead the band to abandon the genre and pursue more melodic metal music with clean vocals, releasing two more albums, Discouraged Ones and Tonight's Decision. The band, happy with the progress, sought out to create a more diverse and intricate work. With prior sessions being plagued by lineup changes, the band first sought to solidify their lineup. The band hired Daniel Liljekvist, as a new drummer, a role previously filled by Renkse and session musician Dan Swanö. This allowed Renkse to focus fully on vocals and lyrics. Additionally, bass guitar, which has been covered by guitarist Frederick Norrman in the prior album, and a number of other musicians prior, was now filled by Frederick's younger brother, Mattias Norrman, allowing Fredrik to focus entirely only being the second guitarist. This setup allowed the band to solidify the lineup for the album's recording, and subsequent three albums.

== Writing and recording ==
Writing for the album started shortly after the release of their prior album, Tonight's Decision, in 1999. Similar to their other albums, most writing was done by band founders Renkse and Anders Nyström; Renkse would write lyrics while Nyström would write the music. Concentrated writing sessions lasted between six and seven months, though many rough song ideas had been written by Renkse intermittently over the years. The band was prone to bouts of writer's block, so Renkse would make a habit of constantly writing down and compiling rough ideas for songs to be revisited and for them to flesh out during dedicated writing sessions.

Recording took place intermittently between April and December 2000 at Sunlight Studios. Financial issues forced the band into recording it in spurts, throughout this time. The sessions were stressful, with band members frustrated that their financial limitations often lead to forced breaks when they desired to continue working on the album. Additionally, the increased downtime led to worrying and dwelling over little details of what they had accomplished in their time in the studio. The reflecting lead to many parts being edited, redone, or omitted from the final version of the album, Renkse felt was stressful at the time, but ultimately lead to an album that more accurately reflected their desired sound.

== Composition and themes ==
The album found the band moving further away from their metal roots. Renkse stated that the music was still rooted in metal in a vague sense, but that the band had moved away from the sound in favor of something that "their parents would listen to", with more of a mature sound. Feeling that prior albums, especially Discouraged Ones had too many songs that sounded too similar to one another, Renkse stated that the band aimed to have each song have a stronger individuality as its "own chapter or sound". American progressive metal band Tool and its album Aenima was a strong influence on the album. William York of AllMusic described the album's sound as "depressing, heavy alternative rock with a notable Cure influence" but that "Katatonia is not really playing metal anymore here". The album features entirely clean vocals of Renkse, frequently overdubbed, along with thick distorted guitar parts and hard-hitting drum sound. The guitars are tuned to E-flat, with this album being the last to feature that tuning before dropping it lower to C standard in subsequent releases. The track "We Must Bury You" contains electronic elements replacing the drum parts. This was initially done because Liljekvist was living out of the city at the time, and had already left when Nyström had finished writing it. Due to the limited time in the studio, and generally short length of the track, a drum machine was used to replicate the sound, something the band felt helped contribute to the album's diversity without completely changing the band's sound.

Lyrically, Renkse described them as "intensely personal" and about his own problems in life. He tried to combine the lyrics and vocals to give a sense of desperation he felt over his troubles. Overtime, he felt the personal lyrics may become overwhelming for both himself and the listener, and decided to write a few songs based around fiction instead. "We Must Bury You" was about a newspaper article he had read about people committing an accidental murder, and the fear and regret he imagined they felt in taking care of the body. "Sweet Nurse" was another entirely fictional account.

== Promotion and release ==
Three months prior to release, the band released an EP, Teargas, essentially as a vehicle for the single "Teargas". It was not something forced to do by their record label, but rather a means to release more music than just a single during the rather substantial lead-up time to the album's release. In addition to containing "Teargas", it contained two other B-sides recorded in the Last Fair Deal Gone Down sessions – "Sulfur" and "March 4". The album was released on 8 May 2001. The band's label, Peaceville, attached a sticker to the record which claimed it was possibly the best record released by the label.

The album was re-released multiple times as well, including in 2004, on vinyl in 2007, and as a "tenth anniversary" release again in 2011. Shortly after the album's initial release, the band embarked on a European tour starting in June 2001, including the band's first performance in Finland.

== Reception ==
Professional ratings
Review scores
Source	Rating
AllMusic	4.5/5 stars
Chronicles of Chaos	(9/10)
Sputnikmusic	5/5 stars

The album received critical acclaim from reviewers. William York of AllMusic praised the album's increased production values from the band's prior releases, stating that it worked well for "accentuating the quiet verse/loud chorus dynamics...making the loud parts hit harder and the softer parts come through with more detail" and concluded that it was"...an excellent album on the whole: heavy, tuneful, and thick with atmosphere and melancholy." Pedro Azevedo of Chronicles of Chaos also praised the album production and sound, stating that it was "...even catchier than Discouraged Ones while every bit as emotional and musically more intense and dynamic than that first record of their clean vocal era, [the album] is an outstanding return to top form for Katatonia. Renkse's vocals are better than ever and truly remarkable...and is one thoroughly listenable, enjoyable and affectingly emotional record."

== Track listing ==
All lyrics by Jonas Renkse.

No.	Title	Music	Length
1.	"Dispossession"	Anders Nyström	5:33
2.	"Chrome"	Nyström, Fredrik Norrman	5:11
3.	"We Must Bury You"	Nyström	2:48
4.	"Teargas"	Nyström	3:22
5.	"I Transpire"	Nyström, Norrman	5:54
6.	"Tonight's Music"	Nyström, Renkse	4:17
7.	"Clean Today"	Nyström	4:22
8.	"The Future of Speech"	Nyström, Norrman	5:38
9.	"Passing Bird"	Nyström, Renkse	3:35
10.	"Sweet Nurse"	Nyström	3:53
11.	"Don't Tell a Soul"	Nyström, Norrman	5:42
Total length:			50:39

2004 reissue bonus tracks
No.	Title	Length
12.	"Sulfur"	6:22
13.	"4 March"	3:51
14.	"Help Me Disappear"	5:13
Total length:		66:05

2011 10th anniversary reissue bonus track (includes 2004 reissue bonus tracks)
No.	Title	Length
15.	"O How I Enjoy the Light" (Palace cover)	2:44
Total length:		68:49

== Personnel ==
- Jonas Renkse – vocals
- Anders Nyström – guitar, mellotron
- Fredrik Norrman – guitar
- Mattias Norrman – bass
- Daniel Liljekvist – drums
