= City Burials =

Studio album by Katatonia
- Released: 24 April 2020
- Recorded: October–November 2019
- Studios: Soundtrade Studios, Tri-Lamb Studios, The City of Glass (Stockholm, Sweden)
- Genres: Progressive metal, doom metal, heavy metal
- Length: 48:32
- Label: Peaceville
- Producers: Jonas Renkse, Anders Nyström

Katatonia chronology
The Fall of Hearts (2016)	City Burials (2020)	Sky Void of Stars (2023)

Singles from City Burials
- 1. "Lacquer" Released: 30 January 2020; 2. "Behind the Blood" Released: 19 March 2020; 3. "The Winter of Our Passing" Released: 22 April 2020

City Burials is the eleventh studio album by Swedish heavy metal band Katatonia. The album continues the progressive rock direction used in recent albums while returning to some of their earlier metal instrumentation. Three singles were released in promotion of the album; "Lacquer", "Behind the Blood", and "The Winter of Our Passing".

== Background ==
The album is their first in four years, since their 2016 album The Fall of Hearts, after entering a one-year hiatus in 2018. The band cited guitarist Roger Öjersson being hospitalized by a serious back injury at the end of 2017, and a number of other undisclosed issues, for the band needing to take some time off and "re-evaluate what the future holds for the band." In February 2019, the band announced their return, and a year later, they announced City Burials and released its first single "Lacquer".

Talking about the hiatus in an interview, vocalist Jonas Renkse explained: "We felt that we needed to recharge and get some perspective. Basically we did a lot of touring from previous albums and by the end of that, the last few gigs, I think we all felt that we were pretty sick of being away from home for such a long time. There were a lot of different reasons for doing this, but in the end, taking a few steps back to evaluate what you want to do next and have some time off is very healthy."

According to a 2025 interview between Terra Relicta and Moilanen, it was revealed that Nyström was uninvolved in the recording process for City Burials and Sky Void of Stars.

== Release and promotion ==
The album was released on 24 April 2020. The release date announcement came with the release of its first single "Lacquer" on 30 January Two more singles have been released, along with music videos, for the tracks "Behind the Blood" on 19 March, and "The Winter of Our Passing" on 22 April. "The Winter of Our Passing" music video was animated by Costin Chiroeanu. Jonas Renkse states: "The letting go of what once was of great importance, now reduced to just another loss. Let's bow before the flame we've all deserted. But thank you for listening."

== Reception ==
Professional ratings
Review scores
Source	Rating
AllMusic	4/5 stars
Blabbermouth.net	8/10
Distorted Sound	6/10
Metal Injection	9/10
Metal Storm	8.0/10

City Burials was met with positive reviews from music critics. AllMusic reviewer Thom Jurek stated, "City Burials is not a reinvention, but it does contain periodic re-engagement with the steely dynamics of heavy metal. Along with excellent songwriting, and Renkse's greatest career-high album-length vocal performance, energize Katatonia, who remain vital and creative in their third decade."

Johnny Sharp of Louder Sound (Metal Hammer) wrote an unrated track-by-track review detailing many of its songs. For example: "'Heart Set To Divide' delivers the kind of slow-building, emotionally charged pomp-prog that Katatonia have increasingly perfected over the course of their evolution from the swamps of early 90s doom metal. But we're also soon reminded that they've lost no teeth in their old age, as 'Behind The Blood' roars in with visceral force, wrapped in crackling, kinetic fretwork from (relatively) new boy Roger Öjersson. That track's intensity is then lifted further with a windswept tragic hero of a chorus, ending with the dramatic admission, 'I can feel you pierce my heart'."

=== Accolades ===
Publications' year-end list appearances for City Burials
Critic/Publication	List	Rank	Ref.
Consequence of Sound	Top 30 Metal/Hard Rock Albums of 2020	22	
Louder Sound	Top 50 best albums of 2020	40	
Loudwire	Top 70 Rock/Metal Albums of 2020	N/A	
Metal Hammer	The 50 best metal albums of 2020	35	

== Track listing ==
All songs written by Jonas Renkse.

No.	Title	Length
1.	"Heart Set to Divide"	5:29
2.	"Behind the Blood"	4:37
3.	"Lacquer"	4:42
4.	"Rein"	4:20
5.	"The Winter of Our Passing"	3:18
6.	"Vanishers"	4:56
7.	"City Glaciers"	5:30
8.	"Flicker"	4:45
9.	"Lachesis"	1:54
10.	"Neon Epitaph"	4:32
11.	"Untrodden"	4:29
Total length:		48:32

Japanese edition bonus track
No.	Title	Length
12.	"Fighters" (Enter the Hunt cover)	3:37
Total length:		52:09

Limited mediabook edition bonus tracks
No.	Title	Length
12.	"Closing of the Sky"	5:26
13.	"Fighters" (Enter the Hunt cover)	3:37
Total length:		57:35

== Personnel ==
Katatonia

- Jonas Renkse – lead vocals, production, art direction
- Roger Öjersson – guitars
- Niklas Sandin – bass
- Daniel Moilanen – drums

Other musicians

- Anders Eriksson – co-production of keyboards, programming, editing
- Joakim Karlsson – additional drum programming (track 3)
- Anni Bernhard – additional vocals (track 6)

Additional personnel

- Jacob Hansen – mixing, mastering
- Daniel Liden– engineering
- Beech – artwork

== Charts ==
Chart performance for City Burials
Chart (2020)	Peak position
Austrian Albums (Ö3 Austria)	10
Dutch Albums (Album Top 100)	41
Finnish Albums (Suomen virallinen lista)	5
German Albums (Offizielle Top 100)	6
Hungarian Albums (MAHASZ)	8
Polish Albums (ZPAV)	3
Portuguese Albums (AFP)	3
Swiss Albums (Schweizer Hitparade)	12
