= Untrue =

Untrue may refer to:

- Falsehood
- False (logic)
- Untrue (album), a 2007 album by Burial, or the title song
- "Untrue", a 2014 single by Tchami
- "Untrue", a song by Katatonia from the album Brave Yester Days
- "Untrue", a song by Coal Chamber from the album Chamber Music
- "Untrue", a 1965 song by The Missing Links
- "Untrue", a 1959 song by Rock-A-Teens
