= Tonight's Music =

Single by Katatonia

from the album Last Fair Deal Gone Down
- Released: 26 November 2001
- Recorded: April – November 2000
- Studio: Sunlight Studio
- Length: 4:20
- Label: Peaceville Records / Snapper Music
- Producer: Katatonia

Katatonia singles chronology
"Tonight's Music" (2001)	"My Twin" (2006)

"Tonight's Music" is a song by Swedish heavy metal band Katatonia, released in 2001 as the only single from their fifth studio album Last Fair Deal Gone Down.

== Track listing ==
No.	Title	Lyrics	Music	Note	Length
1.	"Tonight's Music"	Jonas Renkse	Anders Nyström		4:20
2.	"Help Me Disappear"	Renkse	Nyström		5:13
3.	"O How I Enjoy the Light"	Oldham	Will Oldham	^{Note 1}	2:44

== Note ==
1. "O How I Enjoy The Light" is cover version of Will Oldham.

== Personnel ==
Katatonia

- Jonas Renkse – vocals
- Anders Nyström – guitar, keyboards
- Fredrik Norrman – guitar
- Mattias Norrman – bass guitar
- Daniel Liljekvist – drums, percussion

Production

- Tomas Skogsberg – engineer
- Jocke Petterson – engineer
- Jonas Kjellgren – engineer
- Travis Smith – production, design
