= The Fall of Hearts =

Studio album by Katatonia
- Released: 20 May 2016
- Recorded: November 2015 – January 2016
- Studios: Studio Gröndahl, Tri-lamb Studio, The City of Glass (Stockholm, Sweden)
- Genres: Progressive rock, progressive metal
- Length: 67:25
- Label: Peaceville
- Producers: Jonas Renkse, Anders Nyström

Katatonia chronology
Dead End Kings (2012)	The Fall of Hearts (2016)	City Burials (2020)

Singles from The Fall of Hearts
- 1. "Old Heart Falls" Released: 30 March 2016; 2. "Serein" Released: 10 May 2016

The Fall of Hearts is the tenth studio album by Swedish heavy metal band Katatonia. It was released on 20 May 2016. The album, mostly written and produced by founding members Jonas Renkse and Anders Nyström, was the first to also feature new members Daniel Moilanen and Roger Öjersson. The album moved in a more progressive direction than prior albums, and was generally well received by critics. Two singles were released in promotion of the album, "Old Heart Falls", and "Serein".

== Background ==
The album is their first in four years, after their 2012 album Dead End Kings. In between albums, the band went through two lineup changes, making the album their first to feature new drummer Daniel Moilanen and new guitarist Roger Öjersson. Moilanen replaced the band's prior drummer of fifteen years Daniel Liljekvist, who left in 2014 to focus on family and pursue a more conventional career outside of music. The band mutually decided to part ways with guitarist Per Erikkson, prior guitarist of four years, in 2014 as well; his move to Barcelona complicated the band's recording and touring schedule.

== Writing and composition ==
Despite lineup changes, the album was still primarily written by founding members Jonas Renkse and Anders Nyström. The two wrote in isolation from one another, only sharing what they felt were their better ideas, and then presenting the ideas they both agreed upon to the rest of the band members if they felt it was good enough to build an entire song around. Renkse stated that no boundaries were put on ideas for arranging the album, leading them to be more adventurous in the creation process, actively trying to break away from the formula of their prior few albums. The band didn't desire to "reinvent the wheel, but rather, "break out a little bit from that old frame and do something a little bit different. The inclusion of the technically proficient guitar playing of Öjersson led to the inclusion of more guitar solos on the album, while Moilanen's style of drumming moved the album's sound further into progressive territory. The album had actually been completely recorded prior to Öjersson joining the band, but the band went back and added his guitar solos over the finished work, wanting him to be able to "leave his mark" on the album. Conversely, Moilanen had joined earlier, and had a larger role in shaping the album's content, with Renkse and Nystrom frequently discussing ideas with him. Separately, the success of Dethroned and Uncrowned, the band's acoustic/ambient reworking of their prior album, Dead End Kings, lead the band to feel more comfortable with adding more diverse elements to the album as well.

Sessions went through defined writing, pre-production, demoing, and final recording phases, though members were free to move back through the phases if inspiration or new ideas developed. Songs were often changed throughout the process, with Nystrom noting that many demos were vastly different from final studio recordings. Renkse and Nystrom chose to self-produce the album, preferring their own freedom in the creation process, and out of concern that the potential creative or financial issues of bringing in an outside producer would potentially not be a fit with the band.

The album's overall sound has been described by journalists as progressive rock, with various other influences. Loudwire noted the similarity of the track "Serein" to 1980's new wave music such as The Cure, due to its "gentle strumming and a soft lead... Jonas Renkse’s soothing, multi-tracked voice... a slightly uptempo rhythm [...] uplifting and pop-inflected [...] gorgeous, understated lead work textures." Billboard described "Pale Flag" as having a folk ballad sound. The album's title, The Fall of Hearts, doesn't have any specific meaning but was rather a phrase created by Renkse that he felt best described the overall sound and lyrics of the album.

== Release and promotion ==
The album was released on 20 May 2016. Two singles have been released, along with lyric videos, for the tracks "Old Heart Falls" on 30 March, and "Serein" on 10 May. For the "Old Heart Falls" lyric video, the band actually wrote out the lyrics with an old typewriter, to help give an extra feeling of melancholy to the video, and implemented it with assistance from video editor Lasse Hoile.

Shortly after release, the band toured in support of the album, first focusing on playing festivals such as Hellfest and Tuska, and then moving on to touring across South America starting August 2016, and an extensive tour across Europe afterwards.

== Reception ==
Professional ratings
Aggregate scores
Source	Rating
Metacritic	72/100
Review scores
Source	Rating
AllMusic	4/5 stars
Bloody Disgusting	4.5/5 stars
Classic Rock	3.5/5 stars
Metal Hammer	3.5/5 stars
PopMatters	7/10 stars
Ultimate Guitar	8.7/10

The Fall of Hearts was met with positive reviews from music critics. At Metacritic, a review aggregator site which assigns a normalized rating out of 100 from music critics, the album has received a score of 72/100, based on 4 critics, which indicates "generally favorable reviews". AllMusic reviewer Thom Jurek praised the band for moving into an even more progressive direction, stating, "Their lyrics remain steeped in themes of loss, alienation, desolation, and the desire for transcendence, but their melodies are more labyrinthine, less straight-ahead, and conversely, contain more earworm hooks, making them more accessible to a wider prog rock audience than ever before. Inspiring and forward-looking, this album proves that at 25, Katatonia are still restless and refuse to rest on their laurels." Chad Bowar of Loudwire similarly praised the band's progression from the death metal of their past to more of a progressive rock sound, comparing them to contemporaries Opeth and concluding, "They are veterans and know exactly what they want, and their singular vision is not distorted by any outside influences. The Fall of Hearts is full of both darkness and light, heaviness and softness, drama and understatement. It’s an album that is intricate with a lot of subtleties, but also a lot of accessibility."

== Track listing ==
All songs credited to Katatonia. Writing credits taken from ASCAP.

No.	Title	Writer(s)	Length
1.	"Takeover"	Jonas Renkse, Anders Nyström	7:09
2.	"Serein"	Renkse	4:46
3.	"Old Heart Falls"	Renkse	4:22
4.	"Decima"	Renkse	4:46
5.	"Sanction"	Renkse	5:07
6.	"Residual"	Renkse	6:54
7.	"Serac"	Renkse, Nyström	7:25
8.	"Last Song Before the Fade"	Renkse	5:01
9.	"Shifts"	Renkse, Nyström	4:54
10.	"The Night Subscriber"	Renkse, Nyström	6:10
11.	"Pale Flag"	Renkse	4:23
12.	"Passer"	Renkse, Nyström	6:25
Total length:			67:25

Limited Digibook Edition / Japanese Limited Mediabook Edition 5.1 DVD Bonus Track, Limited Deluxe Book Edition Bonus Tracks, & Japanese Edition Bonus Tracks
No.	Title	Length
13.	"Vakaren"	4:54

Japanese Edition Bonus Tracks
No.	Title	Length
14.	"Night Comes Down (Judas Priest Cover)"	4:11

Limited Deluxe Book Edition Bonus Tracks
No.	Title	Length
14.	"Sistere"	4:11

Limited Deluxe Book Edition Bonus Tracks (Digital Only)
No.	Title	Length
15.	"Wide Awake in Quietus"	4:59

== Personnel ==
Katatonia

- Jonas Renkse – lead vocals, guitars, keyboards, art direction
- Anders Nyström – guitars, keyboards, backing vocals, art direction
- Roger Öjersson – guitar solo (tracks 1, 7 and 12)
- Niklas Sandin – bass
- Daniel Moilanen – drums

Additional personnel

- J P Asplund – additional percussion
- Jens Bogren – mixing, mastering
- Daniel Liden – engineering
- Travis Smith – artwork

== Charts ==
Chart (2016)	Peak position
Australian Albums (ARIA)	62
Austrian Albums (Ö3 Austria)	28
Belgian Albums (Ultratop Flanders)	77
Belgian Albums (Ultratop Wallonia)	187
Dutch Albums (Album Top 100)	42
Finnish Albums (Suomen virallinen lista)	6
French Albums (SNEP)	100
German Albums (Offizielle Top 100)	11
Italian Albums (FIMI)	60
Portuguese Albums (AFP)	32
Scottish Albums (Official Charts)	51
Spanish Albums (Promusicae)	82
Swedish Albums (Sverigetopplistan)	31
Swiss Albums (Schweizer Hitparade)	48
UK Albums (Official Charts)	70
US Billboard 200	188
