= Dead End Kings =

Studio album by Katatonia
- Released: 27 August 2012
- Recorded: February–May 2012
- Studio: Ghost Ward & The City of Glass Studios
- Genre: Progressive metal, gothic metal
- Length: 48:47
- Label: Peaceville
- Producer: Jonas Renkse, Anders Nyström

Katatonia chronology
| Night Is the New Day (2009) | Dead End Kings (2012) | The Fall of Hearts (2016) |

Dead End Kings is the ninth studio album by Swedish heavy metal band Katatonia. It was released on 27 August 2012 in Europe and 28 August in the United States through Peaceville Records. Like all Katatonia releases, the album was written primarily by founding members Jonas Renkse and Anders Nyström. The band went through a number of lineup changes, making the album the first to feature bassist Niklas Sandin, the only album to feature second guitarist Per Eriksson, and the last to feature drummer Daniel Liljekvist.

== Themes and composition ==
Multiple tracks, including "Buildings", allude to abandoned city scenes, which were inspired by Renkse's and Nyström's visiting of abandoned train tunnels and hospitals in abandoned villages in Sweden. The album is not politically themed in the conventional sense of promoting ideologies or presenting solutions, but rather contemplates and laments the poor state of the world due to modern politics in general.

Journalists have noted a similarity in sound to the work of American progressive metal band Tool, a comparison Renkse refers to as accidental but flattering.

== Reception ==
Professional ratings
Review scores
| Source | Rating |
|---|---|
| About.com | 4/5 stars |
| AllMusic | 4/5 stars |
| Drowned in Sound | 8/10 stars |
| The Guardian | 4/5 stars |
| Sputnikmusic | 4.5/5 stars |

The album was generally well received by critics. AllMusic praised the diverse and layered sound production on the album, concluding that "With its various parts, ever-shifting dynamics, and blazing instrumental interludes, it sends the set off with a nearly majestic bang. Dead End Kings is uncompromising in its musical excellence, bleak vision, and dark, hunted beauty; it extends Katatonia's reach exponentially. Kyle Ward, staff reviewer from Sputnikmusic, strongly praised the album for being the perfect culmination of everything the band had strived to become after moving away from their original death metal sound in the late 1990s, citing the albums high production values, layered sound and "emotional sincerity" for the album being a "massive success".

== Track listing ==
All lyrics are written by Jonas Renkse, except "Undo You" and "The Act of Darkening" by Anders Nyström.

| No. | Title | Music | Length |
|---|---|---|---|
| 1. | "The Parting" | Renkse | 4:52 |
| 2. | "The One You Are Looking For Is Not Here" (feat. Silje Wergeland) | Renkse | 3:52 |
| 3. | "Hypnone" | Renkse | 4:07 |
| 4. | "The Racing Heart" | Renkse | 4:06 |
| 5. | "Buildings" | Nyström | 3:28 |
| 6. | "Leech" | Renkse | 4:23 |
| 7. | "Ambitions" | Renkse | 5:07 |
| 8. | "Undo You" | Nyström | 4:56 |
| 9. | "Lethean" | Per Eriksson, Renkse | 4:39 |
| 10. | "First Prayer" | Nyström, Renkse | 4:28 |
| 11. | "Dead Letters" | Nyström | 4:49 |
| Total length: | | | 48:47 |

Limited deluxe book edition bonus tracks
| No. | Title | Music | Length |
|---|---|---|---|
| 12. | "Second" | Renkse, Nyström | 3:34 |
| 13. | "The Act of Darkening" | Nyström | 5:55 |
| Total length: | | | 57:47 |

== Personnel ==
Katatonia

- Jonas Renkse – lead vocals; guitars, production, mixing
- Anders Nyström – guitars, keyboards (12 & 13), backing vocals; production, mixing
- Per Eriksson – guitars, backing vocals; engineering
- Niklas Sandin – bass
- Daniel Liljekvist – drums

Additional personnel

- Frank Default – keyboards (1–11)
- Silje Wergeland – backing vocals (2)
- JP Asplund – addition percussion
- David Castillo – production, engineering, mixing
- Travis Smith – album cover

== Charts ==
| Chart (2012) | Peak position |
|---|---|
| Austrian Albums (Ö3 Austria) | 25 |
| Belgian Albums (Ultratop Flanders) | 157 |
| Belgian Albums (Ultratop Wallonia) | 186 |
| Dutch Albums (Album Top 100) | 60 |
| Finnish Albums (Suomen virallinen lista) | 4 |
| French Albums (SNEP) | 88 |
| German Albums (Offizielle Top 100) | 21 |
| Norwegian Albums (VG-lista) | 17 |
| Swedish Albums (Sverigetopplistan) | 12 |
| Swiss Albums (Schweizer Hitparade) | 46 |
| UK Albums (OCC) | 142 |
