= The Great Cold Distance =

Studio album by Katatonia
- Released: 13 March 2006
- Recorded: May–August 2005
- Genres: Alternative rock; shoegaze; doom metal
- Length: 51:51
- Label: Peaceville
- Producers: Jens Bogren, Katatonia

Katatonia chronology
Viva Emptiness (2003)	The Great Cold Distance (2006)	Live Consternation (2007)

Singles from The Great Cold Distance
- 1. "My Twin" Released: February 13, 2006; 2. "Deliberation" Released: May 15, 2006; 3. "July" Released: February 26, 2007

Professional ratings
Review scores
Source	Rating
AllMusic	4/5 stars
Blabbermouth.net	9/10 stars
Chronicles of Chaos	9.5/10
Decibel	9/10 stars
Metal.de	8/10
PopMatters	8/10 stars
Stylus	A−

The Great Cold Distance is the seventh studio album by Swedish heavy metal band Katatonia, released on 13 March 2006. The album was recorded and mixed at Fascination Street Studios in Örebro between May and August 2005.

== Release ==
The album was re-released on 12 March 2007 with two bonus tracks and with the entire album in 5.1 surround sound.

There is also a special Swedish edition of the album, which came in a limited edition box with an exclusive Katatonia poster, a set of Katatonia postcards and an enhanced video of "My Twin". Music videos were also released for singles "Deliberation" and "July".

== Reception ==
The album is listed at number 8 on PopMatters' list of the Top Metal Albums of 2006.

== Track listing ==
All lyrics are written by Jonas Renkse; all music is composed by Renkse and Anders Nyström, except "Deliberation", co-written by Fredrik Norrman.

No.	Title	Length
1.	"Leaders"	4:21
2.	"Deliberation"	4:00
3.	"Soil's Song"	4:12
4.	"My Twin"	3:41
5.	"Consternation"	3:51
6.	"Follower"	4:46
7.	"Rusted"	4:21
8.	"Increase"	4:20
9.	"July"	4:45
10.	"In the White"	4:54
11.	"The Itch"	4:20
12.	"Journey Through Pressure"	4:21
Total length:		51:51

Double vinyl limited edition reissue
No.	Title	Length
13.	"Displaced"	5:16
14.	"Dissolving Bonds"	3:43
15.	"In the White" (Urban Dub Mix)	5:30
16.	"Code Against the Code"	3:35
Total length:		69:55

10th Anniversary Edition
No.	Title	Length
17.	"Soil's Song (Krister Linder 2012 remix)"	4:43
18.	"Unfurl"	4:49
Total length:		78:07

== Personnel ==
Katatonia

- Jonas Renkse – vocals, additional guitar, keyboards, programming
- Anders Nyström – lead & rhythm guitar, backing vocals, keyboards, programming
- Fredrik Norrman – lead & rhythm guitar
- Mattias Norrman – bass
- Daniel Liljekvist – drums, backing vocals

Additional musicians

- Andreas Åkeberg – backing vocals
- Peter Damin – drum tech, percussion & additional drums on "Journey Through Pressure"

Production

- Jens Bogren – co-production, engineering, mixing, keyboards & programming
- David Castillo – co-production, engineering, mixing, keyboards & programming
- Thomas Eberger – mastering
- Travis Smith – album cover

== Release history ==
Region	Date	Label	Format	Catalog
United Kingdom, Russia	2006	Peaceville, Soyuz Music	CD	CDVILEF 128
United Kingdom	2006	Peaceville	CD	VILELP128
United Kingdom	2006	Peaceville	CD	CDVILEF 128P
United Kingdom	2006	Peaceville	CD	CDVILED128
Russia	April 2006	Союз	CD	CDVILEF128
Ukraine	May 2006	Moon	CD	MR 1633-2
United Kingdom	26 June 2006	Peaceville	Vinyl	VILELP 128
Sweden	2006	Peaceville	CD	CDVILEF 128X
United Kingdom	12 March 2007	Peaceville	CD	CDVILEF176X
United Kingdom	2009	Peaceville	CD	CDVILED264X

== Charts ==
Chart (2006)	Peak position
Finnish Albums (Suomen virallinen lista)	8
Hungarian Albums (MAHASZ)	17
Swedish Albums (Sverigetopplistan)	42
