= Katatonia =

Swedish heavy metal band

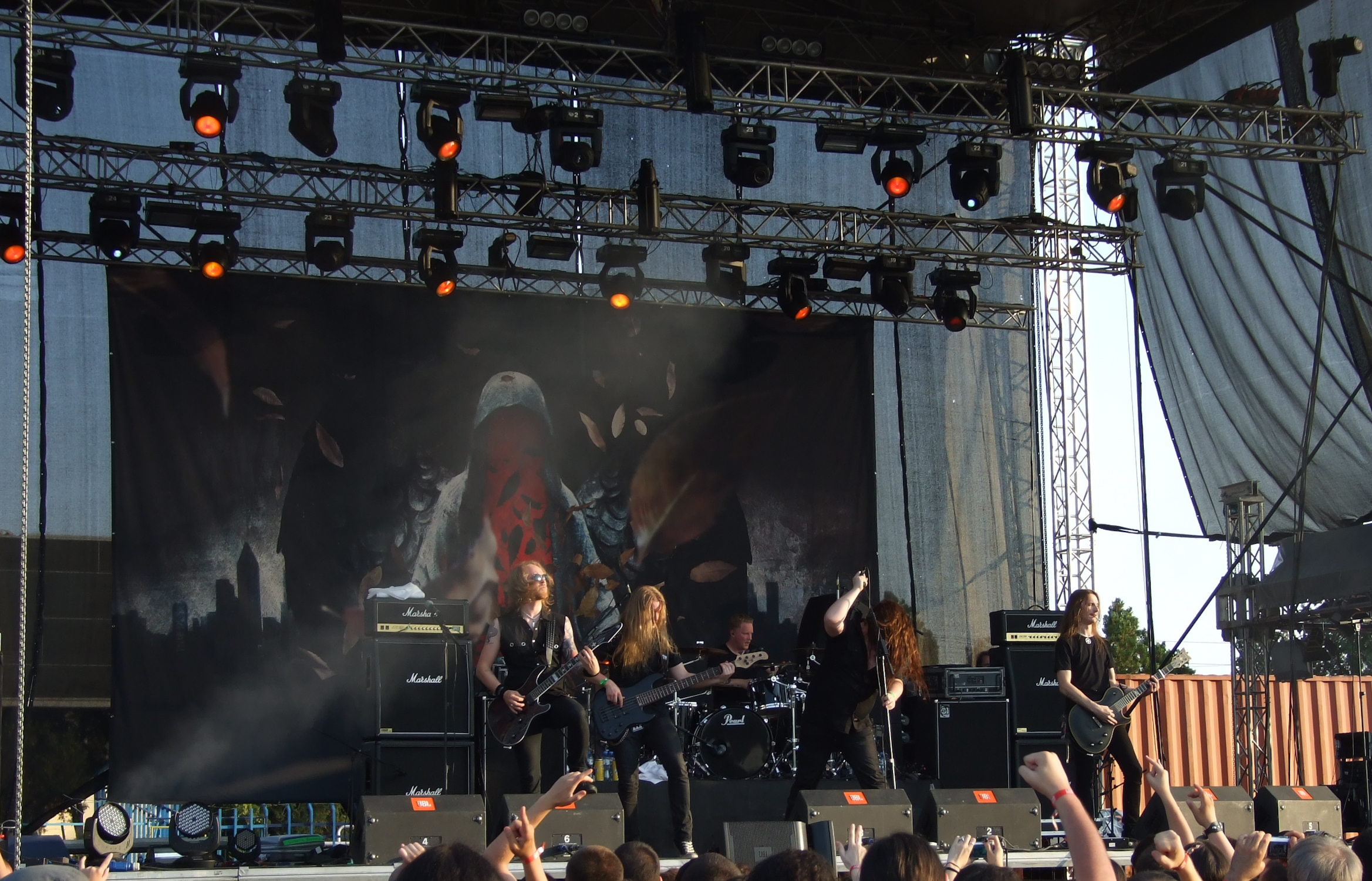
- Katatonia in 2011

Background information
- Origin: Stockholm, Sweden
- Genres: Progressive rock; progressive metal; doom metal; gothic metal; black-doom (early); death-doom (early)
- Years active: 1991–1994; 1996–2018; 2019–present
- Labels: Avantgarde; No Fashion; Peaceville; Vic; Napalm
- Spinoffs: October Tide; Bloodbath
- Members: Jonas Renkse; Niklas Sandin; Daniel Moilanen; Nico Elgstrand; Sebastian Svalland
- Past members: Anders Nyström; Guillaume Le Huche; Fredrik Norrman; Mikael Oretoft; Mattias Norrman; Per Eriksson; Daniel Liljekvist; Mikael Åkerfeldt; Roger Öjersson
- Website: katatonia.com

Katatonia is a Swedish heavy metal band formed in Stockholm in 1991 by Jonas Renkse and Anders Nyström. The band started as a studio-only outlet for their love of death metal. Increasing popularity led to more band members for live performances, though outside of the band's founders, the lineup was a constantly changing musicians throughout the 1990s, including Mikael Åkerfeldt of Opeth for a period. After two albums, Dance of December Souls (1993) and Brave Murder Day (1996), problems with Renkse's vocal cords coupled with new musical influences caused the band to avoid the screamed vocals of black and death metal in favor of traditional, melodic progressive rock.

Katatonia released Discouraged Ones (1998) and Tonight's Decision (1999), before settling into a quintet for the remainder of the 2000s. The band released four more albums with said lineup: Last Fair Deal Gone Down (2001), Viva Emptiness (2003), The Great Cold Distance (2006) and Night Is the New Day (2009). The band moved away from traditional metal and added progressive rock influences over time. While the background lineup changes continued into the 2010s, Renkse and Nyström persisted. The band released their ninth and tenth studio albums, Dead End Kings (2012) and The Fall of Hearts (2016), respectively.

After touring in support of The Fall of Hearts album throughout 2017, the band went into a semi-hiatus at the beginning of 2018. Katatonia returned in February 2019 with their eleventh studio album, City Burials (2020), followed by their twelfth studio album, Sky Void of Stars (2023), and thirteenth studio album, Nightmares as Extensions of the Waking State (2025).

== History ==
=== Formation and early years (1991–1997) ===
Jonas Renkse and Anders Nyström formed the band in 1991 as a two-piece studio-based project. Renkse sang clean and screamed vocals and played drums, while Nyström played bass and guitars. Renkse was the primary lyricist, and Nyström the main composer.

The duo had worked together in some capacity since 1987, adopting aesthetics akin to black/doom metal, similar to bands like Celtic Frost, but started making music in 1991, when work started on the first release, the demo Jhva Elohim Meth... The Revival. The release garnered the attention of Vic Records, which re-released it as an EP in 1993, gaining the duo more exposure.

From this release onwards, the band moved away from black metal while adopting a gothic-based sound, with the members inspired and influenced by death metal becoming popular in Europe at the time. They recruited bass guitarist Guillaume Le Huche. The trio played live and recorded a debut full-length album. Dance of December Souls was released in late 1993.

After touring in support of the album, the trio recorded the EP For Funerals to Come..., released in early 1995. Le Huche left shortly after. Difficulty finding a replacement resulted in the band breaking up for a year. Renkse and Nystrom worked on their own projects. Renkse started the band October Tide with guitarist Fredrik Norrman. Renkse revived Katatonia with Norrman as the third member.

After the year off, the band regrouped in 1996 to record and release a second studio album, Brave Murder Day. In addition to Norrman playing guitars on the album, the band recruited Mikael Åkerfeldt of Opeth to sing screamed vocals, as Renkse was unable to do them himself due to medical issues. The release, alongside the EP Sounds of Decay, released with the same lineup the next year, were considered their last to display their initial black, death and doom metal traits, with the band focusing on clean vocals in subsequent releases, and setting aside the doomier aspects of their sound for faster tempos. To promote the album, the band recruited Mikael Oretoft to play bass and they embarked on their first European tour with progressive metal band In the Woods...

=== Move away from extreme metal (1998–1999) ===
While Renkse experimented with clean, melodic vocals over metal instrumentation as early as the 1994 recording of the track "Scarlet Heavens" (later released in very limited capacity on Katatonia/Primordial in 1996), the band did not feel ready to pursue that sort of sound at the time. However, after the band's 1997 releases, due to a desire to create more emotive and evolving music, the band decided to move in that direction. The first of said releases was an EP entitled Saw You Drown, released in early 1997, which also contained the first wide release of "Scarlet Heavens". Later in 1998, the band released their first full-album of this style, titled Discouraged Ones. After the release, the band signed a multi-album record deal with Peaceville, which would mark the first time the band would work with a bigger label, and stay with them for the long-term. Additionally, Renkse wanted to focus further on dedicating himself to developing his clean vocals, leading him to no longer do any further drumming for the band. The band kept active, recording and releasing their fourth album, Tonight's Decision, in 1999. The sessions were difficult, with the writing alone taking Renkse and Nyström over seven months to complete. Once recording, they recruited Dan Swanö, who had helped assist the band in the past, as a sessions drummer. While the album contained no screamed vocals, the band still retained Åkerfeldt, who still assisted with vocal production on the album, as they had with Discouraged Ones.

After the release of Tonight's Decision, the band, tired of continually searching for session musicians, finally decided to put together a stable, permanent lineup. Fredrick Norrman recruited his brother, Mattias Norrman, as a bassist and Daniel Liljekvist joined the band as the drummer.

=== Stable lineup and international growth (2000–2009) ===
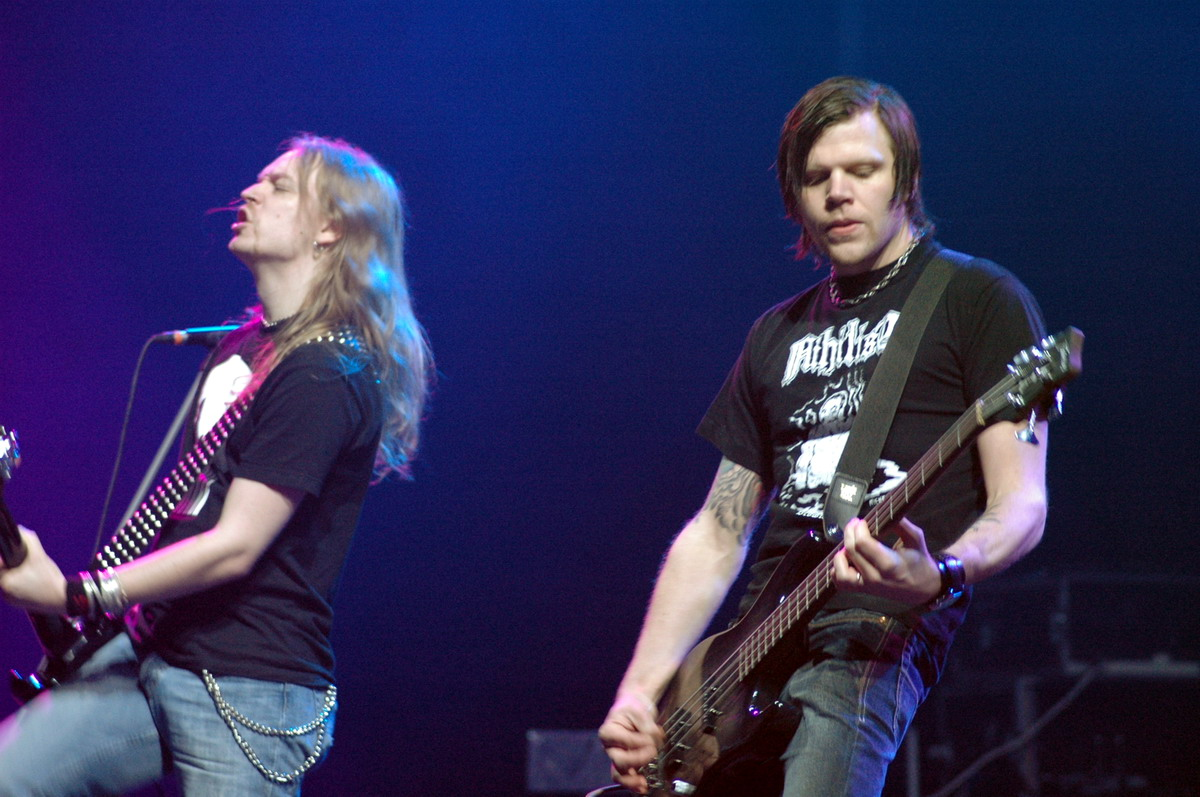
Anders Nystrom and Mattias Norrman

With the band finally achieving a stable lineup with Renkse, Nystrom, the Norrman brothers and Liljekvist, the band began work on their fifth album, the first of four albums the quintet would release over the course of the next decade. While personnel issues no longer plagued the band, recording sessions were still difficult, this time due to financial constraints, which limited how much time they could spend in the studio. The band worked on recording the album off and on from April to December 2000, and while the stopping and starting proved to be troublesome, it also kept them re-evaluating and reworking their material in the downtime, something they felt ultimately helped the shaping of the album. The resulting album, Last Fair Deal Gone Down was released in May 2001, and marked the band further distancing itself from traditional heavy metal music, in favor of more of a hard rock sound. The band decided to release the Teargas EP shortly prior to the album release, essentially as a single, containing the album track "Teargas" and two B-sides. Another EP of music from the same sessions, Tonight's Music, was also released shortly after the album. The band rounded out the year with a European tour with Åkerfeldt's band Opeth, with Renkse and Nystrom even providing guest vocals at some Opeth shows when Åkerfeldt was experiencing trouble with his vocal cords. By mid-2002, the band had started to write material for their sixth album, and by October 2002, they had entered the studio to begin formal recording sessions. In April 2003, the band released the resulting album, Viva Emptiness. The album was promoted by the release of the single "Ghost of the Sun" and the similarly named Ghost of the Spring tour. The tour, which went through Europe with support act Daylight Dies, went as planned, though the band later had to cancel a June performance in Germany due to sickness, and had July festival appearances cancelled due to issues beyond their control with third party organizers. Still, the album was a success, being their first to chart on any official charts, peaking at no. 17 on the Finnish charts.

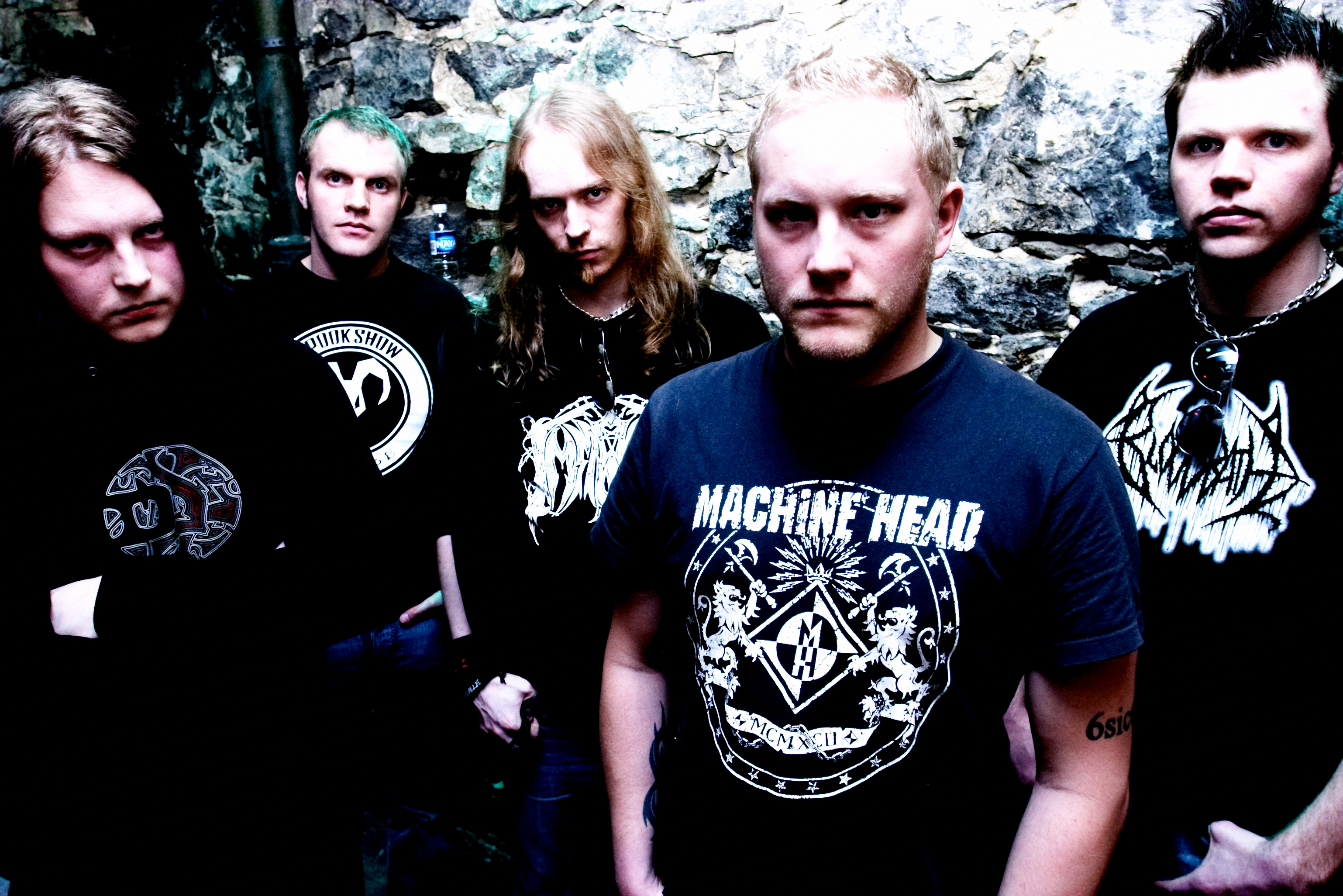
Katatonia in 2004

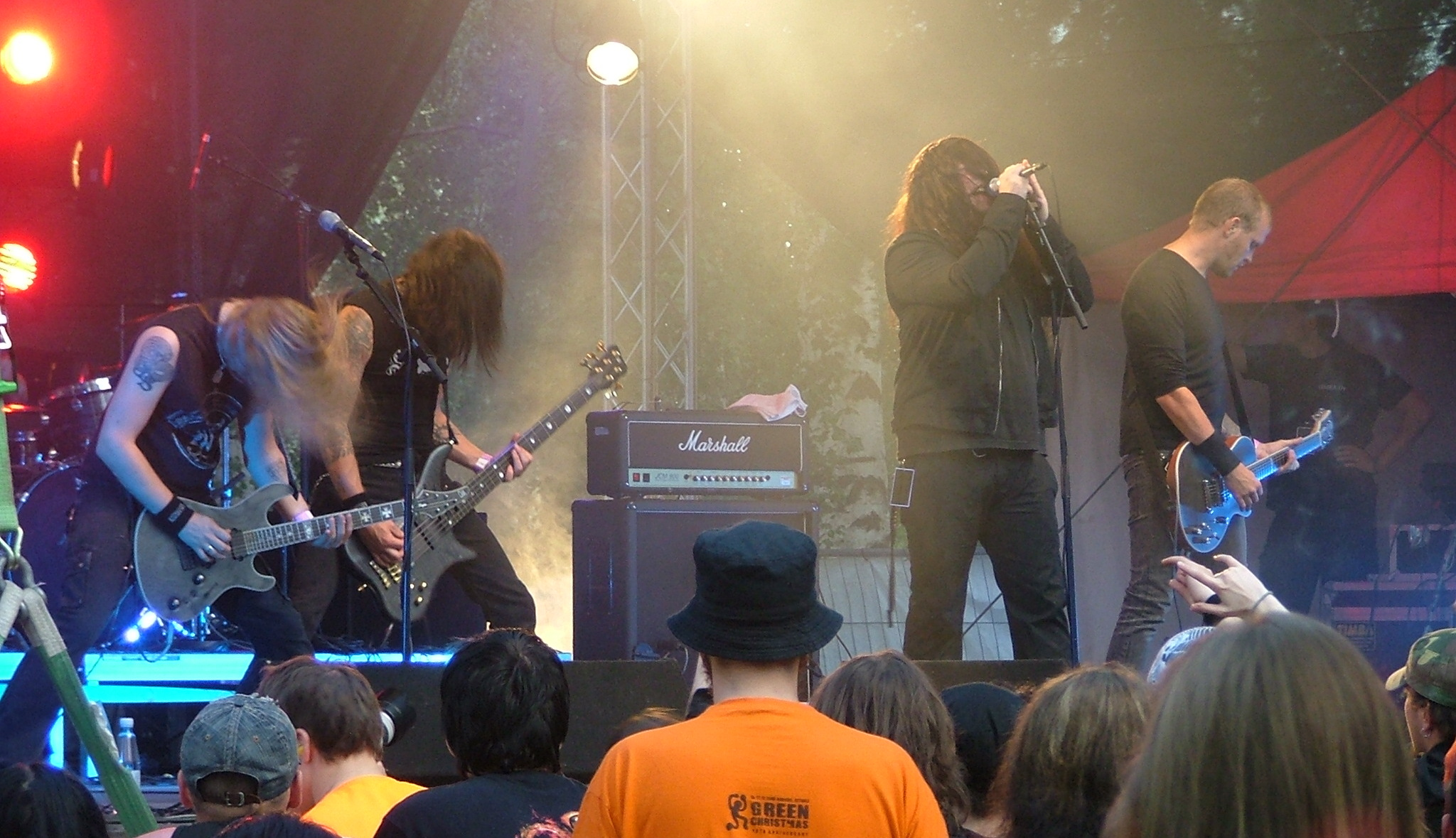
Katatonia in Kuopio at Rockcock-musicfestival, 2008

The band continued to spend much of 2003 and 2004 touring in support of the album. The band started writing for their seventh studio album as early as October 2004, and spent six months of 2005 in the studio recording the album, while taking breaks for further touring. The band's only releases during the time period was two compilation album releases: Brave Yester Days, a collection of songs from their death metal era in the mid-1990s, and The Black Sessions, a collection of songs from after they moved away from death metal. While initially planning on releasing the album by the end of 2005, recording sessions went late into 2005, pushing its release into 2006. The album, entitled The Great Cold Distance, released in March 2006, along with the accompanying singles "My Twin" and "Deliberation".

The band again turned to touring, most notably their live performance at Summer Breeze Open Air in 2006 being used for the release of a live album titled Live Consternation in 2007. Additionally, the band's first full North American tour, with Daylight Dies and Moonspell, ran through October and November 2006. The band continued to tour into 2007, focusing on Europe in the first half of the year, and returning to North America, even Mexico, in the latter half of the year.

With focusing on touring in support of The Great Cold Distance for most of 2006 and 2007, the band turned their focus to working on a new album in early 2008. By mid-2008, the band had booked studio time twice, but cancelled both times, not satisfied with the material accumulated to record each time. Writer's block, largely stemming from the band feeling pressure to release a follow-up that could measure up to The Great Cold Distance, was main reason for the slow progress, as the album had been their biggest success, critically and financially, at the time. Renkse and Nystrom also had difficulty deciding in what direction the album's sound would move into, eventually deciding to move the band into a more progressive rock sound. Progress continued to be slow, with the band continuing to write into 2009, but not entering the studio until mid-2009. The band continued to tour intermittently as well, including a short tour supporting Porcupine Tree in Europe. After over three and a half years, the band finally released their eighth studio album, in November 2009, under the title Night Is the New Day, including the single "Day and Then the Shade" a month prior. The time spent on the album paid off, with it being generally well received by critics. PopMatters deemed the album the second best metal album of 2009.

=== Lineup changes, Dead End Kings and The Fall of Hearts (2010–2017) ===
Shortly after the release of Night is the New Day, the band's first lineup change in a decade occurred when both Norrman brothers amicably left the band, stating they wanted to focus on life at home rather than further touring cycles abroad. They were replaced by longtime guitar tech Per Eriksson on guitar and Niklas Sandin on bass. In March 2010, the band also released another EP, featuring unreleased and alternate versions of songs from Night is the New Day, titled The Longest Year, which were later included on the special edition reissue of the album in 2011. The band continued to tour extensively, including Sonisphere Festival in the UK, and another North American tour with Swallow the Sun in 2010, and another North American tour with Opeth on their Heritage tour in 2011. The band wrapped up the year with a 20th Anniversary concert in December, with the band playing songs spanning their career, and having past members, including the Norrman brothers and Le Huche, rejoin the band to play on some songs.

The band entered the studio to begin work on their ninth studio album on 30 January 2012. The resulting album, Dead End Kings was released in August in Europe and North America. In support of the release, the band co-headlined the "Epic Kings Idols Tour" with The Devin Townsend Project, in North America in September, followed by the "Dead Ends of Europe Tour" with Alcest and Junius in November of the same year. A music video for the single "Lethean", directed by Lasse Hoile, was released on 18 February 2013. In September 2013, the band also released Dethroned & Uncrowned, an album which featured more acoustic leaning re-workings of the songs from Dead End Kings. It was jointly funded by the Burning Shed record label and a crowd sourcing effort on PledgeMusic, which accumulated 190% of the target goal. The band embarked on an acoustic tour – "The Unplugged & Reworked Tour" in support of the album in 2014. Just prior to the touring, the band released another EP of b-sides, Kocytean for Record Store Day 2014.

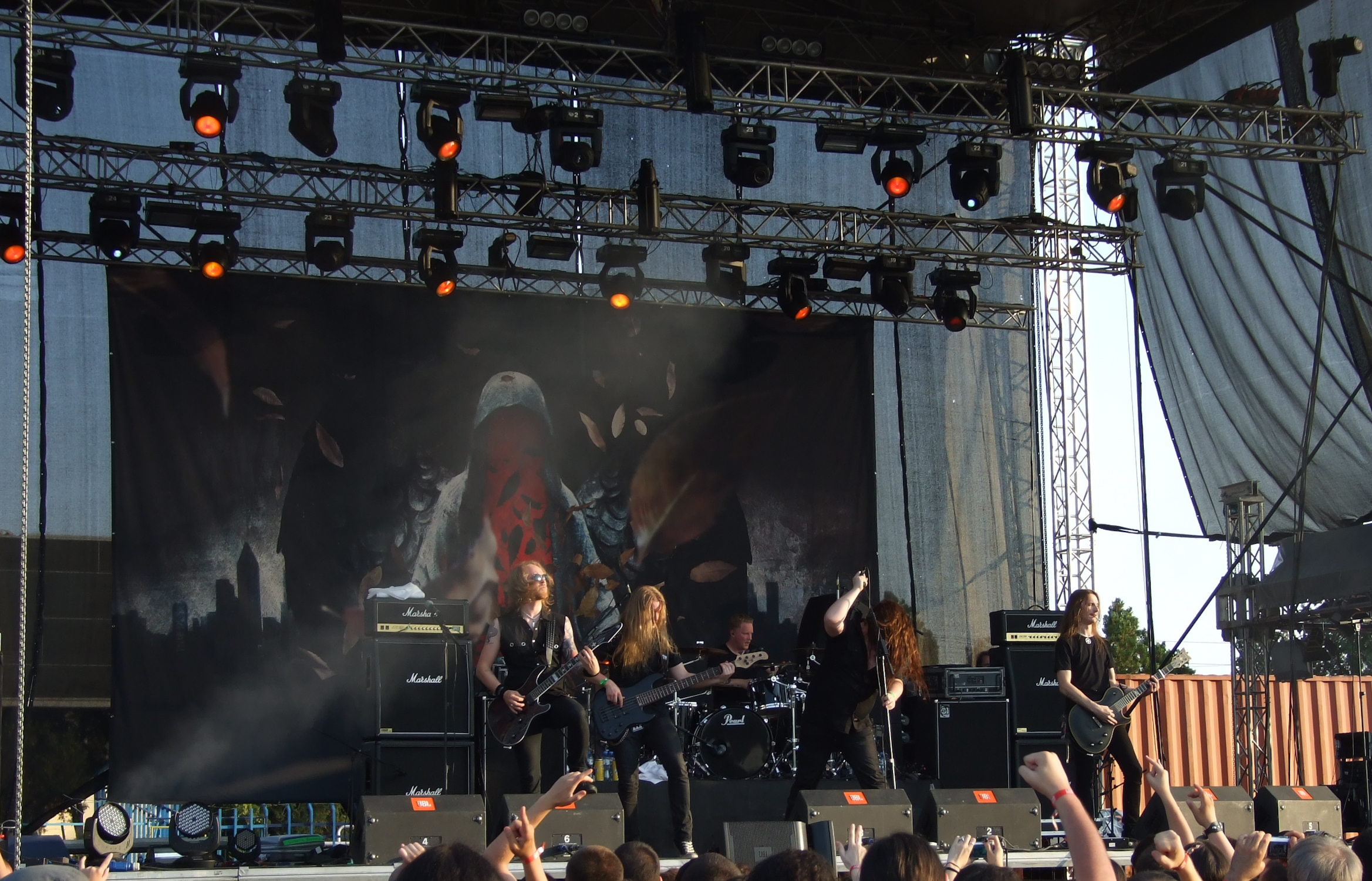
Katatonia at Kavarna Rock Fest 2011, Bulgaria

In 2014, Eriksson and Katatonia "mutually agreed to part ways" due to "a difference in views" and Eriksson's decision to live in Barcelona. Bruce Soord of The Pineapple Thief temporarily filled in Eriksson for the band's May tour, while Tomas Åkvik filled in on guitar afterwards in mid-2014. Longtime drummer Liljekvist also left the band in April 2014, on friendly terms, citing personal and financial reasons. The band released another live album, Sanctitude, on 31 March 2015. In November 2015, the band announced Daniel Moilanen as their new drummer and revealed that they were working on a new album to be released in 2016. The album, The Fall of Hearts was released on 20 May 2016. The album, as well as featuring new drummer Daniel Moilanen, was also the first to feature new guitarist Roger Öjersson; who replaced Eriksson's position as second guitarist. Two singles were released in promotion of the album, "Old Heart Falls" and "Serein". The band continued touring in support of the album in 2017, including a North American tour that started in March.

=== City Burials, Sky Void of Stars, and Nyström departure (2018–present) ===
The band announced they would enter a hiatus in 2018. The band cited Öjersson being hospitalized by a serious back injury at the end of 2017, and a number of other undisclosed issues, for the band needing to take some time off and "re-evaluate what the future holds for the band." In February 2019, the band announced their return to celebrate the tenth anniversary of their 2009 album Night Is the New Day, with an anniversary tour and deluxe release of the album. Their eleventh studio album, City Burials, was released in April 2020; its first single was "Lacquer". Unable to tour in support the album due to the oncoming of the COVID-19 pandemic, the band instead turned to releasing further music. This included releasing a new live album Dead Air (2020), a compilation album Mnemosynean (2021) and a box set of the band's earliest material Melancholium (2022). and forging ahead into writing and recording a twelfth studio album.

The band released their twelfth studio album, Sky Void of Stars, on January 20, 2023, followed by a European and US tour with support from Icelandic post-metal band Solstafir. The band performed at Milwaukee Metal Fest in June 2024.

On March 17, 2025, it was announced that Anders Nyström was departing the band due to "creative preferences and scheduling issues." Within a month of Nyström's departure announcement, the band revealed their 13th studio album, Nightmares as Extensions of the Waking State, would be released on June 6 via Napalm Records, and announced a new lineup consisting of Renkse, Sandin and Moilanen, alongside previous touring guitarists Sebastian Svalland (Pain) and Nico Elgstrand (ex-Entombed, Entombed A.D.), replacing the departing Nyström and Öjersson. In anticipation of the album, Katatonia released a music video for "Lilac".

== Musical style and influences ==
The band is known for changing its sound over the course of its three-decade career. Nyström summarized it in a 2006 interview:

Yeah sure, we see ourselves as a metal band, but without boundaries and limitations to our sound. We do not necessarily belong to a certain subgenre within metal. We're just playing dark and heavy music and keeping an open mind to evolve and being true to ourselves. I'm proud to say that I believe KATATONIA sounds like no other band. We have eloquently avoided the gothic metal genre most bands tend to fall in when changing their sound from doom/death metal to something more rocking and melodic. We're leaning towards more of a contemporary alternative sound, free of all cheese and clichés.

Similarly, Nyström noted of the band's live performances:

Well, it must be hard sometimes for Jonas to sing his heart out with lyrics referring to personal dark and depressive matters and at the same time also be accused of being a reluctant frontman. I actually think much of the stuff he sings about doesn't go in hand with running around on stage, throwing horns, smiling and firing up the audience. We're not an energetic power metal band. I think the withdrawn and shy aura actually does more justice to the concept of our songs than going wild, but we have some songs mainly on the two last albums that don't really fall into the doom and gloom category, but are still dark. And there the more aggressive approach fits better.

Renkse stated that early inspirations for Katatonia included bands of the death metal variety, namely Morbid Angel, Entombed, Carnage, Autopsy and Paradise Lost; especially the latter's album Gothic. Moreover, Renkse has on multiple occasions cited the work of American progressive metal band Tool as an influence. Nyström has cited the work of Porcupine Tree as a large influence for the band in their post-death metal eras. For the 2011 Katatonia documentary Last Fair Day Gone Night, Nyström also credited alternative metal bands such as A Perfect Circle and Mudvayne with inspiring the heavy, single-string riff-oriented sound introduced on 2003's Viva Emptiness.

Their career, as a whole, has been summarized as being a metal band. Their early sound has been described as black/doom and death/doom, and later they incorporated other styles, such as progressive rock, progressive metal, doom metal, gothic rock, gothic metal and post-metal.

== Legacy ==
Some artists and bands have cited Katatonia as an influence, among which are Agalloch, Nachtmystium, Andy Schmidt of Disillusion, Niklas Kvarforth of Shining, Klimt 1918, Marcela Bovio of Stream of Passion, Daylight Dies, Nucleus Torn, Khors, Marjana Semkina of iamthemorning, Wet, Vladimir Agafonkin of Obiymy Doshchu, Nahemah, Forest Stream, Forgotten Tomb, Alex Vynogradoff of Kauan, Bilocate, Maxime Côté of Catuvolcus, Nocturnal Depression, Last Leaf Down, Schizoid Lloyd, and Pallbearer.

In addition, other artists have been quoted expressing admiration for their work including Mark Jansen of Epica, Luc Lemay of Gorguts, Jim Matheos of Fates Warning, Esa Holopainen of Amorphis, and Bruce Soord of The Pineapple Thief.

== Band members ==
=== Current ===
Image	Name	Years active	Instruments	Release contributions
	Jonas Renkse	1991–1994; 1996–present	lead vocals (1991–1994, 1996–present); guitars (1997–1999, 2002–2006, 2012–2016); electronics, programming (2002–2006); keyboards (2005–2006, 2012–2016, 2025–present); drums (1991–1999); backing vocals (1996–1997)	all releases
	Niklas Sandin	2009–present	bass	all releases from Dead End Kings (2012) onwards
	Daniel Moilanen	2015–present	drums	all releases from The Fall of Hearts (2016) onwards
	Nico Elgstrand	2024–present	guitars; backing vocals	Nightmares as Extensions of the Waking State (2025)
	Sebastian Svalland	2024–present	guitars; backing vocals	Nightmares as Extensions of the Waking State (2025)

=== Former ===
Image	Name	Years active	Instruments	Release contributions
	Anders Nyström	1991–1994; 1996–2025	guitars; backing vocals (1991–1994, 1999–2025); keyboards (1997–2016); electronics, programming (2002–2006); bass (1991, 1996)	all releases from Dance of December Souls (1993) to Sky Void of Stars (2023)
	Guillaume Le Huche	1992–1994	bass	Dance of December Souls (1993); Saw You Drown (1998)
	Mikael Åkerfeldt	1996–1997	lead vocals	Brave Murder Day (1996); Discouraged Ones (1998) guest backing vocals
	Fredrik Norrman	1996–2009	guitars (1996–2009); bass (1998–1999)	all releases from Brave Murder Day (1996) to Night Is the New Day (2009), except Sounds of Decay (1997)
	Mikael Oretoft	1997–1998	bass	Saw You Drown (1998); Discouraged Ones (1998)
	Mattias Norrman	1999–2009	bass	all releases from Last Fair Deal Gone Down (2001) to Night Is the New Day (2009)
	Daniel Liljekvist	1999–2014	drums	all releases from Last Fair Deal Gone Down (2001) to Dead End Kings (2013)
	Per Eriksson	2009–2014	guitars; backing vocals	Dead End Kings (2012); Last Fair Day Gone Night (2013)
	Roger Öjersson	2016–2024	guitars; backing vocals	all releases from The Fall of Hearts (2016) to Sky Void of Stars (2023)

== Discography ==
- Dance of December Souls (1993)
- Brave Murder Day (1996)
- Discouraged Ones (1998)
- Tonight's Decision (1999)
- Last Fair Deal Gone Down (2001)
- Viva Emptiness (2003)
- The Great Cold Distance (2006)
- Night Is the New Day (2009)
- Dead End Kings (2012)
- The Fall of Hearts (2016)
- City Burials (2020)
- Sky Void of Stars (2023)
- Nightmares as Extensions of the Waking State (2025)
