= Jhva Elohim Meth... The Revival =

Jhva Elohim Meth
- CD reissue

EP by Katatonia
- Released: 1992
- Recorded: 1992 (Gorysound Studios)
- Genre: Death-doom; black-doom
- Length: 17:11
- Producer: Katatonia and Dan Swanö

Katatonia chronology
Jhva Elohim Meth (1992)	Dance of December Souls (1993)

Jhva Elohim Meth (Hebrew: "יהוה אלוהים מת", Meaning: "God is dead") is the debut EP by Swedish heavy metal band Katatonia, self-released in 1992.

Holland label VIC Records re-released the EP on CD with the title Jhva Elohim Meth... The Revival, and in 2000 in LP format. The band admit in their 20th anniversary documentary included on Last Fair Day Gone Night that the intended title uses the word Jehova but they could not remember how to spell it correctly.

The track "Without God" was re-recorded for the band's 1993 debut album Dance of December Souls.

== Track listing ==
1. "Midwinter Gates (prologue)" – 0:43
2. "Without God" – 6:52
3. "Palace of Frost" – 3:40
4. "The Northern Silence" – 4:00
5. "Crimson Tears (epilogue)" – 1:56

== Personnel ==
Band

- Jonas Renkse – drums, lead vocals and lyrics
- Anders Nyström – electric & acoustic guitars, bass and music

Additional musicians

- Dan Swanö – keyboards, additional vocals, mixing and engineering
