= Viva Emptiness =

Studio album by Katatonia
- Released: 29 April 2003
- Recorded: October–November 2002
- Studio: Studios 301 (Stockholm); Studio Kuling B (Örebro)
- Genre: Alternative metal; doom metal
- Length: 52:45
- Label: Peaceville
- Producer: Anders Nyström, Jonas Renkse

Katatonia chronology
Last Fair Deal Gone Down (2001)	Viva Emptiness (2003)	The Great Cold Distance (2006)

Professional ratings
Review scores
Source	Rating
AllMusic	4.5/5 stars

Viva Emptiness is the sixth studio album by Swedish heavy metal band Katatonia, released in 2003 by Peaceville Records.

== Background ==
In October 2002, the band began recording Viva Emptiness at Studios 301 in Stockholm. In a departure from the band’s previous sessions, the album was entirely self-produced. In a 2013 interview, frontman Jonas Renkse described the album’s rushed recording process: “we just had a guy coming in there and sorting the mics and drums and stuff, and then we just started recording everything ourselves. And when it was time to mix it, we didn’t have the time to because the studio time was up. ” The short amount of time provided for the band posed various challenges, with the song “Inside the City of Glass” having to be shortened and reworked into an instrumental. A total of 15 songs were recorded for the album, including the track “Wait Outside”, which was cut from the album and later released on the compilation album The Black Sessions.

As the band was unable to complete the album on time, additional recording was carried out at Studio Kulin B in Örebro. The album was mixed by Jens Bogren, and was his first ever project. The band has since expressed their disappointment with the original mix, noting the snare sound. Though initial reports had indicated the album was to be mixed by Dan Swanö, he only made minor contributions. The track "Ghost of the Sun" was released as a promotional single, also featuring the tracks "Criminals" and "Evidence".

In 2013, for its 10th anniversary, the album received a reissue. For this release, the band enlisted longtime producer David Castillo to remix the album. Speaking about the remix, Renkse noted: “since it was made in quite a rush back then, it’s always been something we’ve wanted to redo. It’s something we’ve talked about even since the album came out.” Along with this, Renkse heavily reworked the album’s keyboards; some songs simply had their sounds modified, while others had new arrangements created for them. The band also reworked the song “Into the City of Glass”, extending it and recording new vocals, restoring it to their original vision. Finally, the cut track “Wait Outside” was added back to the album, and had a lyric video released for it. Leading up to the reissue’s release, the band performed a series of dates opening for Paradise Lost, who were themselves celebrating their 25th anniversary. To mark the occasion, the band performed Viva Emptiness in its entirety at each show.

== Music ==
At the time of Viva Emptiness’s release, the band described it as “by far the most hard material [they’ve] ever written”. For the album, the band began tuning their guitars down to C Standard, and introduced several keyboard sections. Renkse would later describe it as a transitional album between the more “pop-oriented” sound on the band’s past few albums, and their return to a more metal-influenced sound on their subsequent albums.

== Artwork ==
The album's artwork, designed by Travis Smith features the artist's daughter walking along a highway. For the 10th anniversary reissue, a new cover was designed once again featuring Smith’s daughter, now ten years older. Renkse described the band’s vision for the reissue cover: “Well, the concept is pretty much that ten years have passed and this girl that was walking towards something on the first version is now reaching the destination on the new one. You can see it in front of her, which is pretty much nothingness; emptiness.”

== Track listing ==
All lyrics are written by Jonas Renkse; all music is composed by Renkse and Anders Nyström, except where noted.

No.	Title	Length
1.	"Ghost of the Sun"	4:07
2.	"Sleeper"	4:08
3.	"Criminals"	3:47
4.	"A Premonition" (Fredrik Norrman, Nyström, Renkse)	3:33
5.	"Will I Arrive"	4:09
6.	"Burn the Remembrance"	5:22
7.	"Wealth"	4:22
8.	"One Year from Now"	4:02
9.	"Walking by a Wire"	3:32
10.	"Complicity"	4:01
11.	"Evidence"	4:36
12.	"Omerta"	2:58
13.	"Inside the City of Glass" (instrumental)	4:08
Total length:		52:45

10th Anniversary Edition
No.	Title	Length
13.	"Wait Outside"	3:39
14.	"Inside the City of Glass"	5:35
Total length:		58:11

== Personnel ==
Band

- Jonas Renkse – vocals, guitar, programming
- Anders Nyström – guitar, keyboards, programming
- Fredrik Norrman – guitar
- Mattias Norrman – bass, slide guitar on "One Year from Now"
- Daniel Liljekvist – drums, percussion, backing vocals on "Ghost of the Sun"

Production

- Travis Smith – art direction, design
- Eddie Korbich – editing
- Dan Swanö – additional editing
- Jens Bogren – mixing
- Peter In De Betou – mastering
- Richard Lundberg – band photography

== Charts ==
Chart (2003)	Peak position
Finnish Albums (Suomen virallinen lista)	17
