= My Twin =

Single by Katatonia

from the album The Great Cold Distance
- Released: February 13, 2006
- Recorded: February – September 2005
- Genre: Gothic metal
- Length: 3:43
- Label: Peaceville
- Songwriter(s): Anders Nyström and Jonas Renkse
- Producer(s): Anders Nyström and Jonas Renkse

Katatonia singles chronology
"Tonight's Music" (2001)	"My Twin" (2006)	"Deliberation" (2006)

"My Twin" is a 2006 single by the Swedish heavy metal band Katatonia. It was the first single off the band's seventh studio album, The Great Cold Distance. Charlie Granberg was in charge of directing the single's music video. The single charted at no. 9 on the Finnish music charts.

== Track listing ==
All music is composed by Renkse and Nyström.

No.	Title	Lyrics	Length
1.	"My Twin"	Renkse	3:43
2.	"My Twin" (Opium Dub)	Renkse	4:17
3.	"Displaced"	Renkse	5:16
4.	"Dissolving Bonds"	Nyström	3:42

== Personnel ==
Katatonia

- Jonas Renkse – vocals, guitar, keyboards, loops, programming, sound effects
- Anders Nyström – guitar, keyboard, loops, programming, sound effects
- Fredrick Norrman – guitar
- Mattias Norrman – bass
- Daniel Liljekvist – drums

Additional personnel

- Jens Bogren – keyboards, loops, programming, sound effects
- David Castillo – keyboards, loops, programming, sound effects
- Peter Damin – drum tech, percussion
