= Katatonia/Primordial =

Katatonia / Primordial

EP by Primordial and Katatonia
- Released: 1996
- Genres: Black metal (Primordial); Gothic rock, gothic metal (Katatonia)
- Length: 15:56
- Label: Misanthropy Records

In 1996, a split 10" EP was released on Misanthropy Records consisting of one song each from Primordial and Katatonia. Primordial recorded a new version (often referred to as the "MCMXCVI" version of the song) of an old demo song, at Academy Studios in Yorkshire, exclusively for this release. Katatonia's song was recorded at Unisound Studios in Finspång, in February 1994. The EP was available only on purple vinyl format, limited to 777 copies.

== Track listing ==
No.	Title	Artist	Length
1.	"To Enter Pagan"	Primordial	5:35
2.	"Scarlet Heavens"	Katatonia	10:21

== Personnel ==
=== Katatonia ===
- Jonas Renkse – vocals, drums
- Blackheim – guitar
- Le Huche (Guillaume Le Huche) – bass

=== Production ===
- Dan Swanö – mixing, engineering, production
- Katatonia – production

== Notes ==
- Katatonia's song was later featured on the Saw You Drown EP in 1998.
- Primordial's song marks the final performance of the band's original drummer, Derek "D." MacAmlaigh.
