= Night Is the New Day =

Studio album by Katatonia
- Released: 2 November 2009
- Recorded: July–August 2009
- Genre: Alternative metal; doom metal; gothic metal
- Length: 48:40
- Label: Peaceville
- Producer: Jonas Renkse; Anders Nyström; David Castillo

Katatonia chronology
Live Consternation (2007)	Night Is the New Day (2009)	The Longest Year (2010)

Night Is the New Day is the eighth studio album by Swedish heavy metal band Katatonia. It was released 2 November 2009, in Europe and 10 November 2009, in North America through Peaceville Records. Thirteen tracks were recorded, eleven of which made it onto the record. The band describes the material as "Our most varied, diverse and possibly strongest shit all together on one and the same album". "Idle Blood" had the working title "Kozelek", named after Mark Kozelek, a member of Red House Painters, which is one of Katatonia's influences. This is the last Katatonia release with the Norrman brothers.

== Release and reception ==
Professional ratings
Review scores
Source	Rating
About.com	4.5/5 stars
AllMusic	4/5 stars
Blabbermouth.net	8/10 stars
PopMatters	9/10 stars
Rock Sound	9/10
Sputnikmusic	4/5

Night Is the New Day sold more than 2,000 copies in the United States in its first week of release. "Day and Then the Shade" was the first single, released in late 2009. The promotional video for this song was directed by Lasse Hoile.

== Musical style ==
Night Is the New Day shows Katatonia expanding their music palette. The album shows a slightly more progressive sound than The Great Cold Distance, yet retains the heaviness and morose atmosphere, with electronics and synths playing an important role. The big, heavy parts are interspersed with quiet, somber electronics, and acoustic guitars. Each song transforms frequently, changing tempo, intensity and texture. "Forsaker" starts aggressively but soon the down-tuned metal chords shift to chiming darkwave strains. "The Longest Year" intertwines synth and metal passages, while the acoustic style of "Idle Blood" is comparable to Opeth and Porcupine Tree. "Nephilim" brings together a dissonant minor-chord chorus with a plodding beat and an oppressive atmosphere. The single "Day and Then the Shade" is both brooding and heavy, as well as atmospheric and progressive.

== Critical reception ==
The album was generally well received by critics. The album was deemed the second best metal album of 2009 by Popmatters.

== Track listing ==
All tracks are written by Jonas Renkse, except where noted. Writing credits taken from ASCAP.

No.	Title	Lyrics	Music	Length
1.	"Forsaker"		Renkse; Anders Nyström	4:05
2.	"The Longest Year"			4:39
3.	"Idle Blood"	Nyström	Nyström	4:23
4.	"Onward into Battle"		Renkse; Nyström	3:51
5.	"Liberation"			4:18
6.	"The Promise of Deceit"			4:17
7.	"Nephilim"			4:27
8.	"New Night"			4:27
9.	"Inheritance"			4:30
10.	"Day and Then the Shade"			4:27
11.	"Departer"	Renkse; Krister Linder		5:28
Total length:				48:33

2011 tour edition reissue bonus tracks
No.	Title	Music	Length
12.	"Ashen"	Renkse; Nyström	4:09
13.	"Sold Heart"		4:36
14.	"Day & Then the Shade" (Frank Default Mix)		5:39
15.	"Idle Blood (Linje 14)"		3:23

Vinyl and Swedish CD edition
No.	Title	Length
1.	"Forsaker"	4:05
2.	"The Longest Year"	4:39
3.	"Idle Blood"	4:23
4.	"Onward into Battle"	3:51
5.	"Liberation"	4:18
6.	"The Promise of Deceit"	4:17
7.	"Nephilim"	4:27
8.	"New Night"	4:27
9.	"Inheritance"	4:30
10.	"Day and Then the Shade"	4:27
11.	"Ashen"	4:09
12.	"Departer"	5:28
Total length:		52:49

== Chart positions ==
Chart (2009)	Peak position
Finnish Albums Chart	8
French Albums Chart	141
German Albums Chart	77
Swedish Albums Chart	39

== Credits ==
=== Katatonia ===
- Jonas Renkse – lead vocals; production
- Anders Nyström – lead guitar; production
- Fredrik Norrman – rhythm guitar
- Mattias Norrman – bass guitar
- Daniel Liljekvist – drums

=== Additional personnel ===
- Krister Linder – co-vocals on "Departer"
- Frank Default – keyboards, additional strings and additional percussion
- David Castillo – production
- Travis Smith – artwork, design
- Linda Åkerberg – photography
