= Saw You Drown =

EP by Katatonia
- Released: 1 January 1998
- Recorded: February 1994 (4); July–August 1997 (1–3)
- Genres: Doom metal, gothic metal
- Length: 24:32
- Label: Avantgarde Music
- Producers: Katatonia (1–3); Dan Swanö (4)

Katatonia chronology
Sounds of Decay (1997)	Saw You Drown (1998)	Discouraged Ones (1998)

Professional ratings
Review scores
Source	Rating
Allmusic	1.5/5 stars

Saw You Drown is the fourth EP by Swedish heavy metal band Katatonia, released in 1998. The EP is limited to 1500 hand-numbered copies. In 2005, it was re-issued on clear/blue wax 10" LP in 1000 hand-numbered copies.

The first two tracks are previews of the then-upcoming Discouraged Ones album, and "Quiet World" was recorded in the same studio session, and "Scarlet Heavens" was recorded and mixed at Unisound Studio in February 1994, and originally issued on the 1996 Katatonia/Primordial Split 10".

While all of the band's previous efforts utilized growled vocals almost exclusively, Saw You Drown begins the band's shift towards clean vocals. This release first shows on the album cover the band's changed & second logo, coinciding with the change in sound.

== Track listing ==
All tracks are written by Anders Nyström and Jonas Renkse.

No.	Title	Length
1.	"Saw You Drown"	5:02
2.	"Nerve"	4:31
3.	"Quiet World"	4:37
4.	"Scarlet Heavens"	10:25

== Personnel ==
Katatonia

- Jonas Renkse – lead vocals, drums (tracks 1–4)
- Anders Nyström – guitar; backing vocals (tracks 1–4) & keyboards (tracks 1–3)
- Fredrik Norrman – guitar (tracks 1–3)
- Micke Oretoft – bass (tracks 1–3)
- Guillaume Le Huche – bass (track 4)

Additional personnel

- Dan Swanö – keyboards (track 4)
