= Tonight's Decision =

Studio album by Katatonia
- Released: 31 August 1999
- Recorded: February–April 1999
- Genre: Alternative rock
- Length: 56:14
- Label: Peaceville
- Producer: Katatonia

Katatonia chronology
Discouraged Ones (1998)	Tonight's Decision (1999)	Last Fair Deal Gone Down (2001)

Professional ratings
Review scores
Source	Rating
AllMusic	4/5 stars
Chronicles of Chaos	8/10
Metal.de	6/10

Tonight's Decision is the fourth studio album by Swedish heavy metal band Katatonia, released in 1999 by Peaceville Records. It was reissued in 2003 with two bonus tracks.

== Background ==
Around this time, the band were being influenced less by metal and more by alternative, with Renkse citing Jeff Buckley, whose song "Nightmares by the Sea" was covered on this album, as well as Radiohead as examples.

Renkse's close friend, Mikael Åkerfeldt of Opeth, was present to help record, produce and work on ideas for vocal tracks.

== Track listing ==
All tracks are written by Nyström and Renkse except where noted.

No.	Title	Length
1.	"For My Demons"	5:47
2.	"I Am Nothing"	4:37
3.	"In Death, a Song"	4:51
4.	"Had to (Leave)"	6:03
5.	"This Punishment"	2:46
6.	"Right Into the Bliss"	5:04
7.	"No Good Can Come of This"	4:24
8.	"Strained"	4:15
9.	"A Darkness Coming"	5:01
10.	"Nightmares by the Sea" (Jeff Buckley)	4:15
11.	"Black Session" (song ends at 7:00 and a hidden track begins at 7:25)	9:15
Total length:		56:14

2003 re-release
No.	Title	Length
11.	"Black Session" (without hidden track)	7:00
12.	"No Devotion"	4:48
13.	"Fractured" (song ends at 3:30 and the same hidden track starts at 4:00)	5:52
Total length:		64:39

== Personnel ==
=== Katatonia ===
- Jonas Renkse – vocals
- Anders Nyström – guitars, keyboards, backing vocals
- Fredrik Norrman – bass
- Dan Swanö – session drums

=== Additional personnel ===
- Mikael Åkerfeldt – additional vocal production
- Travis Smith – artwork, design, layout
- Paul Loasby – management
- Mia Lorentzson – mastering
- Joakim Petterson – engineering
- Tomas Skogsberg – engineering
- Camilla Af Geijerstam – photography
- Martin Bencik – desert photography assistant
- Brad Gilson Jr. – photography
