= Dance of December Souls =

Studio album by Katatonia
- Released: 14 December 1993
- Recorded: 4–9 April 1993 at Unisound Studios
- Genre: Death-doom; black metal
- Length: 53:35
- Label: No Fashion
- Producer: Dan Swanö, Katatonia

Katatonia chronology
| Jhva Elohim Meth... The Revival (1992) | Dance of December Souls (1993) | For Funerals to Come... (1995) |

Professional ratings
Review scores
| Source | Rating |
|---|---|
| AllMusic | 3/5 stars |

Dance of December Souls is the debut studio album by Swedish heavy metal band Katatonia. It was released on CD in 1993 by No Fashion Records and LP by Helion Records, released in the US in 1999 by Century Black. In 2004, record label Black Lodge reissued the album with all new artwork, but the band has stated on its website that it does not support this release for personal reasons. In 2007, the album was reissued, this time under Peaceville UK with a blue version of the original cover and all five songs from the Jhva Elohim Meth... The Revival EP appended as bonus tracks. In 2010, Svart Records released a double vinyl version, which also included all songs from the EP.

This album is the first release with Guillaume Le Huche as the bassist; prior to it, Anders Nyström had been contributing all guitar and bass guitar. The sound mixes the band's later style of doom metal with genres such as death metal and black metal.

== Track listing ==
- All music by Anders Nyström, all lyrics by Jonas Renkse.

| No. | Title | Length |
|---|---|---|
| 1. | "Seven Dreaming Souls (Intro)" | 0:45 |
| 2. | "Gateways of Bereavement" | 8:15 |
| 3. | "In Silence Enshrined" | 6:30 |
| 4. | "Without God" | 6:51 |
| 5. | "Elohim Meth" | 1:42 |
| 6. | "Velvet Thorns (of Drynwhyl)" | 13:56 |
| 7. | "Tomb of Insomnia" | 13:09 |
| 8. | "Dancing December" | 2:18 |
| Total length: | | 53:35 |

== Personnel ==
Katatonia

- Jonas Renkse (as Lord J. Renkse) – lead vocals, drums, percussion
- Anders Nyström (as Blackheim) – guitars
- Guillaume Le Huche (as Israphel Wing) – bass

Additional musicians

- Dan Swanö (as Day DiSyraah) – keyboards, additional vocals

Production

- Dan Swanö – mixing and engineering
- Peter Dahl – mastering
- Tom Martinsen – cover design, photos
- Lennart Kaltea – photos
