= Catuvolcus (band) =

Canadian metal band

- Origin: Warwick, Quebec, Canada
- Genres: Folk metal, black metal
- Years active: 2007–2014
- Labels: Deathbound Records, Hymnes d'Antan
- Members: Pierre-Alexandre Plessix; Maxime Côté; Etienne Gallo; Dominic "Forest" Lapointe
- Past members: Matrak Tveskaeg
- Website: Official

Catuvolcus is a Canadian metal band from Warwick, Quebec. They combine elements of folk metal, black metal and progressive metal. Catuvolcus' lyrics are mostly in French.

According to Plessix, they took their name in reference to Catuvolcus, the king of half of the country of the Eburones, a people between the Meuse and Rhine rivers, who united with Ambiorix, the other king, in the insurrection against the Romans in 54 BC.

Catuvolcus' lyrics mainly deal with historical events of the Roman invasion in Gaul.

== Formation and history ==
Catuvolcus was formed in Warwick, Quebec, in 2007 by Pierre-Alexandre Plessix. The one-man band released the first Catuvolcus demo, Old Rituals for Camulos, in 2008, later expanding to a quartet for 2009 concerts. That May, the band released their first full-length album, Vae Victis. The band returned as a one-man band at the beginning of 2010. That August Maxime Côté and Matrak Tveskag joined the band as full members. The second Catuvolcus production, Terres de Sang, was released at the end of 2010. Metal Call Out's critic J. Deathscript wrote, "Terres de Sang is a perfect example of everything that is RIGHT with the modern black metal scene", while Metal Storm described the band as "obviously well trained in the art of mind reading as well – in each song just as you're about to think to yourself 'Ok, enough blast beats' they bring out some outrageously epic sounding melody or acoustic guitar segment."

In 2011, they recorded their third album, Gergovia, featuring members of Daylight Dies and Gallowbraid, and released in 2012. The reviewer at Chronicles of Chaos gave it 8 out of 10, describing it as "both exhilarating and enjoyable." In 2012, Catuvolcus signed to a new Montreal-based label, Deathbound Records, which released the album worldwide in physical and digital formats. Gergovia is known as the first concept album from Catuvolcus, featuring the 12-minute song "Litaviccos", described by Infernal Masquerade as "a text-book example for bands to come". The entire album is about the Battle of Gergovia, which happened in 52 BC. In July 2012 the band recorded a Woods of Ypres' cover for a tribute album dedicated to Woods of Ypres frontman David Gold entitled A Heart Of Gold: Tribute To Woods Of Ypres.

Catuvolcus joined Hymnes d'Antan, a Quebec-based label, to re-release their sold-out record Terres de Sang. The new edition was released on February 26, 2013, along with the band's first lyric video, for the song "Vercingétorix".

Catuvolcus' lineups had been noticeably unstable since their beginning, with only Plessix participating on every release by the band. Matrak Tveskaeg left the band in early 2012. In early 2013, the band announced Etienne Gallo and Dominic Forest Lapointe from Augury respectively as their drummer and bassist on the final record Voyageurs de l'Aube.

== Members ==
Current lineup

- Pierre-Alexandre Plessix — vocals, guitars, (2007–present)
- Maxime Côté — lead guitar, studio bass (2010–present)
- Etienne Gallo — drums (2013)
- Dominic "Forest" Lapointe — bass (2013)

Other members

- Matrak Tveskaeg — bass (2010–2012)

== Discography ==
=== Studio albums ===
- Vae Victis (2009)
- Gergovia (2012)
- Voyageurs de l'Aube (2013)

=== EPs ===
- Terres de Sang (2010)

=== Demos ===
- "Old Rituals for Camulos" (2008)

=== Videos ===
- "Vercingétorix" (2013)
- "Gergovia" (2012)
- "Terres de Sang" (2010)
