= Discouraged Ones =

Studio album by Katatonia
- Released: 27 April 1998
- Recorded: July–August 1997
- Studio: Sunlight Studios
- Genre: Gothic metal
- Length: 46:57
- Label: Avantgarde Music
- Producer: Katatonia

Katatonia chronology
Saw You Drown (1998)	Discouraged Ones (1998)	Tonight's Decision (1999)

Professional ratings
Review scores
Source	Rating
AllMusic	4.5/5 stars
Chronicles of Chaos	9/10

Discouraged Ones (stylized discøuraged ønes) is the third studio album by Swedish heavy metal band Katatonia, released on 27 April 1998. This is the only Katatonia album with bassist Micke Oretoft. It is also their last release with Jonas Renkse on drums; on future releases, he was the band's lead vocalist and contributed additional guitar work. According to Renkse, Discouraged Ones had sold roughly 20,000 copies as of 2001.

== Track listing ==
All tracks are written by Renkse and Nyström unless noted otherwise.

No.	Title	Length
1.	"I Break"	4:24
2.	"Stalemate"	4:21
3.	"Deadhouse"	4:37
4.	"Relention"	3:39
5.	"Cold Ways"	5:22
6.	"Gone"	2:49
7.	"Last Resort"	4:37
8.	"Nerve"	4:32
9.	"Saw You Drown"	5:04
10.	"Instrumental"	2:52
11.	"Distrust"	4:57
Total length:		46:57

2007 re-release bonus tracks
No.	Title	Length
12.	"Quiet World" (written by Nyström, Renkse, F. Norrman, Oretoft)	4:39
13.	"Scarlet Heavens"	10:26
Total length:		62:02

== Release history ==
Date	Note
27 April 1998	1998 original issue
23 February 2007	2007 reissue
2009	2009 LP reissue (150 orange and 350 yellow)
2011	2011 LP reissue (350 black and 550 orange)
2013	2013 LP reissue
2019	2019 LP reissue

== Personnel ==
=== Katatonia ===
- Jonas Renkse – drums, guitars, lead vocals
- Anders Nyström – guitars, keyboards, backing vocals
- Fred Norrman – guitars
- Micke Oretoft – bass

=== Additional personnel ===
- Mikael Åkerfeldt – backing vocals, vocal production
- Tomas Skogsberg – engineering, mixing
- Fred Estby – engineering
- Pressens Bild – photography
- Tom Martinsen – photography, digital design
- Maria Winsnes – photography
- David Castillo – remastering
- reesycle.com – layout
