= Anders Nyström =

Swedish musician

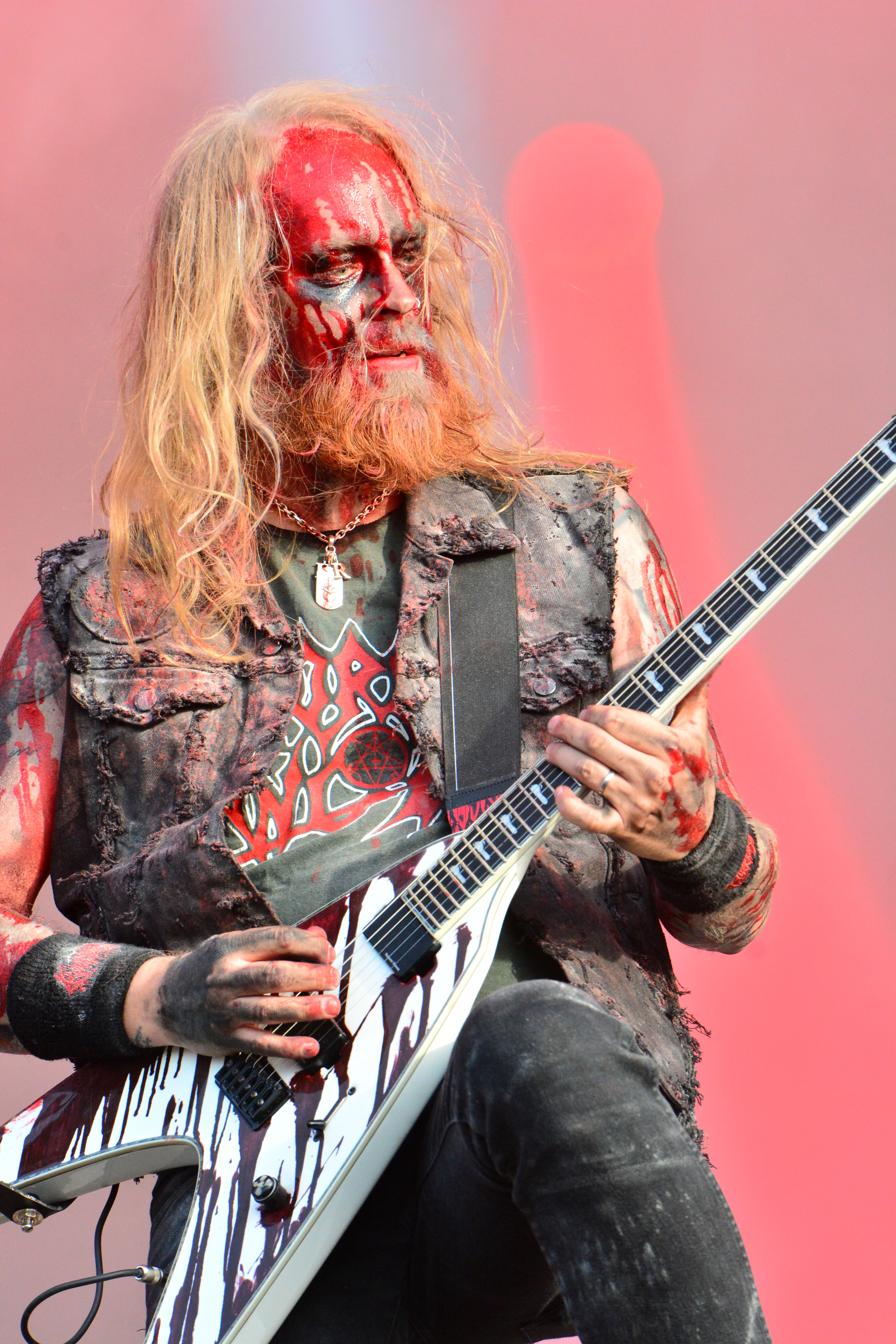
- Nyström with Bloodbath in 2015

Background information
- Also known as: Blakkheim
- Born: 22 April 1975 (age 51); Brännkyrka, Sweden
- Genres: Death metal, death-doom, progressive metal, black metal, avant-garde metal, gothic rock, progressive rock
- Occupations: Musician, songwriter
- Instruments: Guitar, vocals, keyboards, bass, programming

Anders Nyström (born 22 April 1975), also known as Blakkheim (or formerly Blackheim), is a Swedish musician, best known as a founding member of Katatonia and Bloodbath alongside Jonas Renkse.

== Career ==
Nyström formed the Swedish metal band Katatonia with Jonas Renkse in 1991. Nyström was involved in the songwriting, guitars, backing vocals, keyboards, programming, arrangements, art direction and production of Katatonia along with Renkse.

He was a member of the metal band Bewitched from 1995 to 1997 and is a member of the death metal project Bloodbath. He has released four albums as the solo black metal act Diabolical Masquerade, which was active from 1993 to 2004.

On March 17, 2025, Renkse announced Anders left Katatonia. Nyström stated that his departure was because of the band's disregard of earlier material. He felt that the band's name should have been retired when the band departed from their death-doom roots. Fellow Katatonia guitarist Roger Öjersson had previously stated Nyström did not contribute guitars to the band's two previous albums.

== Artistry ==
Nystrom says he perceives heavy metal guitar riffs as "small themes" fit for a horror film soundtrack. He has cited Entombed vocalist/drummer Nicke Andersson's approach to death metal as having significantly influenced him. He said, "[Andersson] wanted to view his death metal in the same way, which was just fantastic for me because I view riffs as small themes that could be suitable for a horror score if you transcribe them for an orchestra. They have so much in common. In death metal, you strip it down to just a few instruments and have the guitars lead you through." Regarding his approach to equipment and guitar tone, he said, "It’s all about experimenting. Imagine if the guy from Nihilist hadn’t have crossed that HM-2 pedal with that amp to find that overload of sound?"

== Discography ==
=== With Bewitched ===
- Diabolical Desecration CD 1996
- Encyclopedia of Evil MCD 1996
- Pentagram Prayer CD 1997

=== Guest appearances ===
- Cancer – guitar on the track "Ballcutter" from the album Shadow Gripped (2019)
- Novembre – guest lead guitar on "Annoluce" from the Peaceville release URSA
