= Jonas Renkse =

Swedish musician (born 1975)

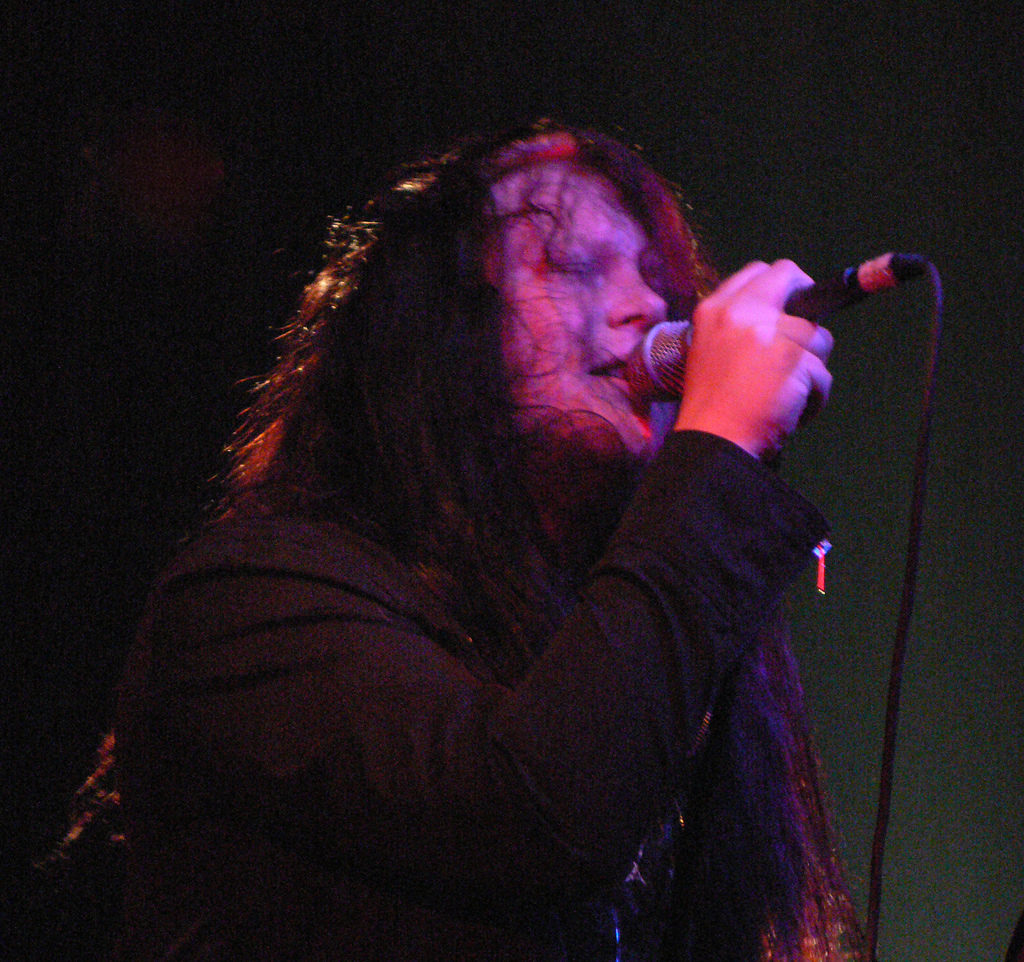
- Jonas Renkse singing for Katatonia in 2007

Background information
- Also known as: Lord Seth; Lord J. Renkse
- Born: 19 May 1975 (age 51); Hägersten, Stockholm, Sweden
- Genres: Death-doom, doom metal, alternative metal, death metal, alternative rock, gothic rock, progressive metal
- Occupations: Musician, singer-songwriter, producer.
- Instruments: Vocals, bass, guitar, drums.
- Website: jonasrenkse.com

Jonas Petter Renkse (born 19 May 1975) is a Swedish musician in the bands Katatonia (1991–) as lead vocalist, founder, songwriter (1991–1994, 1997–) and formerly as drummer (1991–1994, 1996–1998); formerly in Bloodbath (1998–2023) as bassist, founder, songwriter; and in Wisdom of Crowds (2013–) as co-vocalist.

He was also the founding member, drummer, vocalist, guitarist & songwriter of the band October Tide.

== History ==
In 1995 Katatonia was put on a halt due to not having a suitable lineup, and Renkse subsequently decided to form October Tide.

In 1996, Jonas' performance of death vocals had taken such a toll that by 1997 he would only sing cleanly. By 1998, Renkse decided he would focus strictly on vocals and abandon drums.

Renkse wanted to guest on The Ocean's album Precambrian, but due to Katatonia's touring schedule during its production, The Ocean could not approach him on time. He would later appear on the track "Devonian: Nascent" off of their 2018 release Phanerozoic I: Paleozoic, as well as "Jurassic | Cretaceous" from the 2020 release Phanerozoic II: Mesozoic & Cenozoic.

== Personal life ==
Renkse has three children, and is best friends with singer Mikael Åkerfeldt of the band Opeth. Åkerfeldt recorded part of the Blackwater Park album at Renkse's house.

== Discography ==
=== With October Tide ===
- Rain Without End (1997)
- Grey Dawn (1999)
- Tunnel of No Light (2013) – Lyrics

=== Bruce Soord with Jonas Renkse ===
- Wisdom of Crowds (2013)

=== With KORDA ===
- Sialia/Chrome Eyes (2022, Single)
- Lucent (2022, Single)
- Chaser (2022, Single)

=== Lyrics ===
- "Losing Myself" from Infernal by Edge of Sanity (1997)

=== Producer ===
- "Still Day Beneath the Sun" by Opeth (2002)

=== Guest vocals ===
- "The Justice of Suffering" from Hope by Swallow the Sun (2007)
- "01011001" by Ayreon (2008)
- "Nearing Grave" from Avoid the Light by Long Distance Calling (2009)
- "Ascending" from Worlds I Create by Pantheon I (2009)
- "Waking Dreams" on "Ayreon Universe – The Best of Ayreon Live" tour and album by Ayreon (2017)
- "Comatose" on "Ayreon Universe – The Best of Ayreon Live" tour and album by Ayreon (2017)
- "The Silence" on "Off The Cross – ERA EP" album by Off The Cross (2018)
- "Devonian: Nascent" on "Phanerozoic I: Palaeozoic" album by The Ocean Collective (2018)
- "Jurassic | Cretaceous" on "Phanerozoic II: Mesozoic & Cenozoic" album by The Ocean Collective (2020)
- 01011001 – Live Beneath the Waves by Ayreon (2024)

== Equipment ==
=== Vocals ===
- Shure Beta 87a (Microphone)
- TC-Helicon Voicelive2 (Vocal Processor)

=== Other ===
- Sennheiser G2 (In-Ear Monitor System)

=== Guitars ===
- Ibanez 1975 Cherry (Electric)
- Session Acoustic Steel Six-strings (Acoustic)

=== Bass ===
- Morgan Legend Series Jazz (black)
- Ibanez EDB405
- Mayones Guitars & Basses Jabba-5
