= Opeth discography =

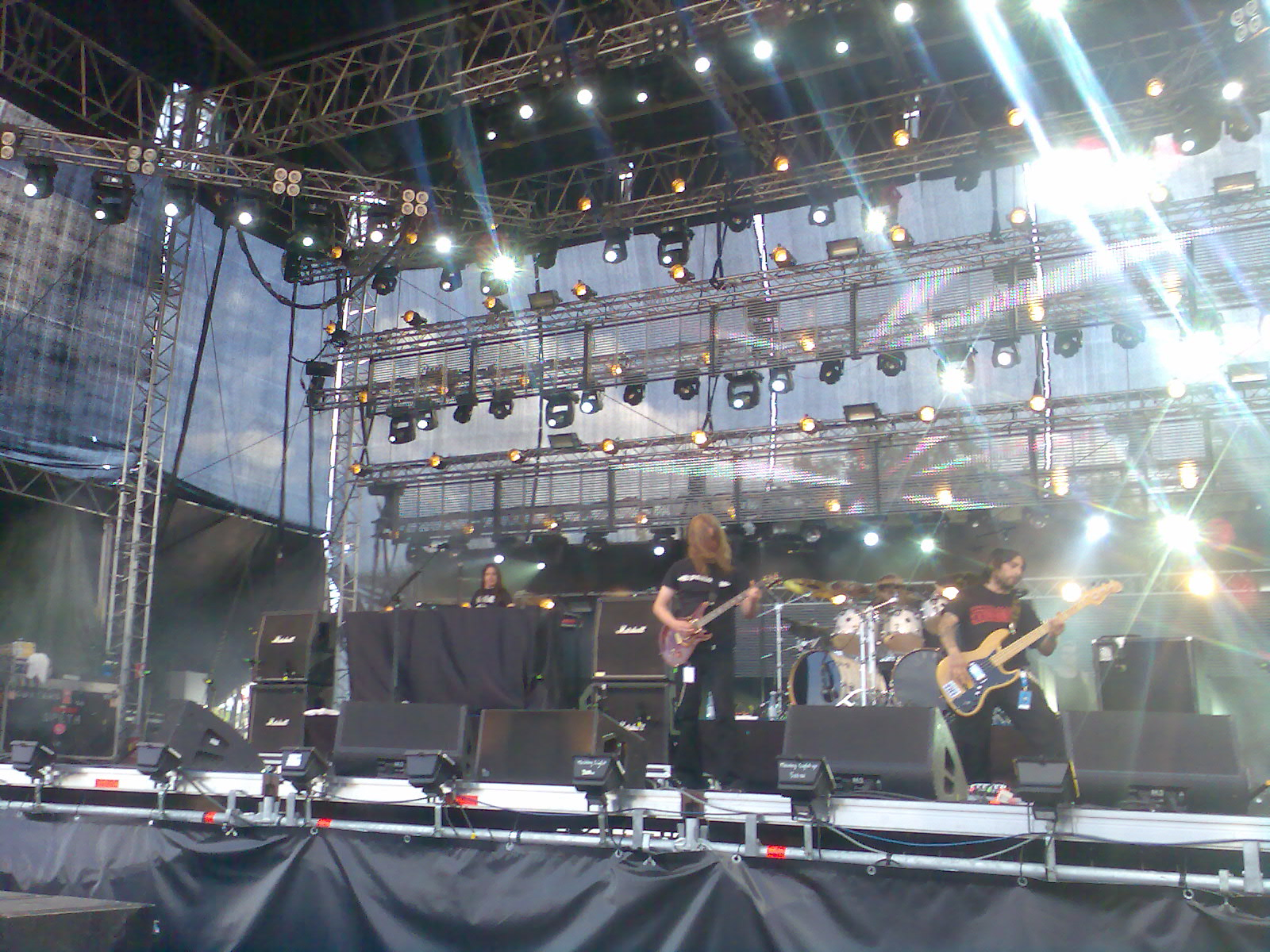
- Opeth live at Ruisrock 2008 in Turku, Finland
- Studio albums: 14
- Live albums: 4
- Singles: 17
- Video albums: 4
- Music videos: 6
- Box sets: 3

The discography of Opeth, a Stockholm, Sweden-based progressive metal band, consists of fourteen studio albums, four live albums, three box sets, three video albums and seventeen singles.

Opeth was formed in 1990 by vocalist David Isberg. He later recruited bassist Mikael Åkerfeldt without the consent of the other band members he previously hired, which resulted in the departure of all members except Isberg and Åkerfeldt. Isberg soon left, but Åkerfeldt decided to remain in the band and keep it in activity. For this he contacted guitarist Peter Lindgren, bassist Johan De Farfalla, and drummer Anders Nordin. With this lineup, they recorded a demo, which led to the band's first record label contract. Candlelight Records signed the band. In 1995, Opeth released their first studio album, Orchid, and after more changes to the lineup, the band released Morningrise and My Arms, Your Hearse in 1996 and 1998 respectively.

Åkerfeldt and Lindgren, the two remaining members of the band, asked drummer Martin Lopez and bassist Martín Méndez to join the band, both of whom accepted. In 1999, they released the concept album Still Life. Steven Wilson joined Opeth in the studio for their fifth album, 2001's Blackwater Park, producing and providing extra backing vocals and instruments. The band supported the album with their first worldwide tour. After promoting the album, Opeth entered the studio again, recording two albums. The first album, Deliverance that was released in 2002, debuted at number 19 on the Top Heatseekers in the United States. The second album, Damnation was released a year later, and peaked at number 192 on the Billboard 200. Per Wiberg joined the band as a keyboardist and recorded Ghost Reveries, which peaked at number 64 on the Billboard 200. Lopez and Lindgren both left Opeth and were replaced by Martin Axenrot and Fredrik Åkesson. In 2008, the band released their ninth studio album Watershed, which debuted at number 23 on the Billboard 200 and peaked at the top of the Finnish charts. Their tenth studio album Heritage which released in 2011, debuted at number 19 on the Billboard 200, at number 2 on the US Hard Rock Albums and at number 6 on the Rock Albums charts, making it highest-charting record to date. The album also peaked at number 22 on the UK Albums chart.

Joakim Svalberg became the band's new keyboardist in 2011. Their 2014 album Pale Communion achieved some of the band's highest international chart placements, reaching number one in Finland and the top five in several other countries. Their 2016 album Sorceress reached number 1 in Germany and the top ten in several other countries. In 2019 they released their thirteenth album, In Cauda Venenum.

Soon after, in 2021, and just ahead of their North American tour, it was announced on official channels that Martin Axenrot would be leaving the band due to unspecified "conflict of interests". The upcoming tour was filled in by Therion's drummer Sami Karpinnen and, in 2022, Finnish drummer Waltteri Väyrynen joined the band permanently. Their latest album The Last Will and Testament was released in November 2024.

== Albums ==
=== Studio albums ===
Title	Album details	Peak chart positions											Sales	Certifications
Title	Album details	SWE	AUS	FIN	FRA	GER	JPN	NLD	NOR	SWI	UK	US	Sales	Certifications
Orchid	Released: 15 May 1995; Label: Candlelight/Century Black	—	—	—	—	—	—	—	—	—	—	—		
Morningrise	Released: 24 June 1996; Label: Candlelight/Century Black	—	—	—	—	—	—	—	—	—	—	—		
My Arms, Your Hearse	Released: 18 August 1998; Label: Candlelight/Century Black	—	—	—	—	—	—	—	—	—	—	—		
Still Life	Released: 19 October 1999; Label: Peaceville	—	—	—	—	—	—	—	—	—	—	—		
Blackwater Park	Released: 27 February 2001; Label: Music for Nations/Koch	—	—	—	—	—	—	—	—	—	—	—	US: 93,000+ (as of 2008)	BPI: Silver
Deliverance	Released: 12 November 2002; Label: Music for Nations/Koch	—	—	—	—	—	—	—	—	—	—	—		
Damnation	Released: 22 April 2003; Label: Music for Nations/Koch	—	54	37	112	—	—	97	—	—	181	192	US: 72,000+ (as of 2008)	
Ghost Reveries	Released: 30 August 2005; Label: Roadrunner	9	35	10	72	39	—	38	21	—	62	64	US: 94,000+ (as of 2008)	
Watershed	Released: 3 June 2008; Label: Roadrunner	7	7	1	47	23	52	14	7	24	34	23	US: 19,000+ (as of 2008)	
Heritage	Released: 20 September 2011; Label: Roadrunner	4	12	2	24	9	55	10	8	13	22	19		
Pale Communion	Released: 26 August 2014; Label: Roadrunner	3	17	1	45	3	48	23	5	24	14	19		
Sorceress	Released: 30 September 2016; Label: Nuclear Blast	7	7	3	29	1	69	11	8	6	11	24		
In Cauda Venenum	Released: 27 September 2019; Label: Nuclear Blast	12	20	2	46	5	97	16	9	10	13	59		
The Last Will and Testament	Released: 22 November 2024; Label: Moderbolaget, Reigning Phoenix	4	29	4	52	3	44	12	13	3	42	140		
"—" denotes releases that did not chart or were not released in that country.														

=== Live albums ===
Title	Album details	Peak chart positions				Sales
Title	Album details	SWE	FIN	FRA	JPN	Sales
Lamentations: Live at Shepherd's Bush Empire 2003	Released: 23 November 2003; Label: Koch	—	—	—	—	
The Roundhouse Tapes	Released: 5 November 2007; Label: Peaceville	—	—	176	159	US: 2,000+
In Live Concert at the Royal Albert Hall	Released: 20 September 2010; Label: Roadrunner	60	36	—	—	
Garden of the Titans: Live at Red Rocks Amphitheater	Released: 2 November 2018; Label: Nuclear Blast	—	—	—	—	
"—" denotes releases that did not chart or were not released in that country.

=== Video albums ===
Title	Album details	Peak chart positions					Sales	Certifications
Title	Album details	SWE	FIN	NLD	JPN	FRA	Sales	Certifications
Lamentations	Released: 23 November 2003; Label: Koch	14	—	—	—	—	CAN: 10,000+	CAN: Platinum
The Roundhouse Tapes	Released: 10 November 2008; Label: Peaceville	4	1	—	159	—		
In Live Concert at the Royal Albert Hall	Released: 20 September 2010; Label: Roadrunner	—	—	6	161	4	US: 3,200+	
Garden of the Titans: Live at Red Rocks Amphitheater	Released: 2 November 2018; Label: Nuclear Blast	—	—	—	107	—		
"—" denotes releases that did not chart or were not released in that country.

=== Compilation albums ===
Title	Album details	Peak chart positions
Title	Album details	BEL
Deliverance & Damnation Remixed	Released: 30 October 2015; Label: Music for Nations	166

=== Box sets ===
Title	Box set details	Content
Collecter's Edition Slipcase	Released: 17 October 2006; Label: Koch	Blackwater Park; Deliverance; Damnation; Lamentations
The Candlelight Years	Released: 26 June 2008; Label: Candlelight	Orchid; Morningrise; My Arms, Your Hearse
The Wooden Box	Released: 26 February 2009; Label: Viva Hate	Orchid; Morningrise; My Arms, Your Hearse

== Singles ==
Year	Title	Album
2001	"The Drapery Falls"	Blackwater Park
2002	"Deliverance"	Deliverance
2002	"Still Day Beneath the Sun"	Non-album single
2003	"Windowpane"	Damnation
2003	"In My Time of Need"	Damnation
2004	"Master's Apprentices"	Lamentations
2005	"The Grand Conjuration"	Ghost Reveries
2006	"Ghost of Perdition"	Ghost Reveries
2006	"Soldier of Fortune"	Ghost Reveries
2008	"Porcelain Heart"	Watershed
2008	"Mellotron Heart"	Watershed
2008	"Burden"	Watershed
2011	"The Throat of Winter"	Non-album single
2011	"The Devil's Orchard"	Heritage
2011	"Slither"	Heritage
2014	"Cusp of Eternity"	Pale Communion
2016	"Sorceress"	Sorceress
2016	"Will O the Wisp"	Sorceress
2016	"The Wilde Flowers"	Sorceress
2016	"Era"	Sorceress
2019	"Hjärtat vet vad handen gör" / "Heart in Hand"	In Cauda Venenum
2019	"Svekets prins" / "Dignity"	In Cauda Venenum
2019	"Cirkelns riktning"	In Cauda Venenum
2024	"§1"	The Last Will and Testament
2024	"§3"	The Last Will and Testament

== Music videos ==
Year	Title	Director
2001	"Harvest"	Fredrik Odefjärd
2003	"Windowpane"	Fredrik Odefjärd
2005	"The Grand Conjuration"	Bill Yukich
2008
2008	"Porcelain Heart"	Lasse Hoile
2008	"Burden"	Lasse Hoile
2011	"The Devil's Orchard"	Phil Mucci
2017	"Era"	Markus Hofko
2019	"Universal Truth" / "Ingen Sanning Är Allas"	Jess Cope
2025	"§1"	Ash Pears
2025	"§3"	Absynthe Moon Media
2026	"§7"	
