= List of Opeth band members =

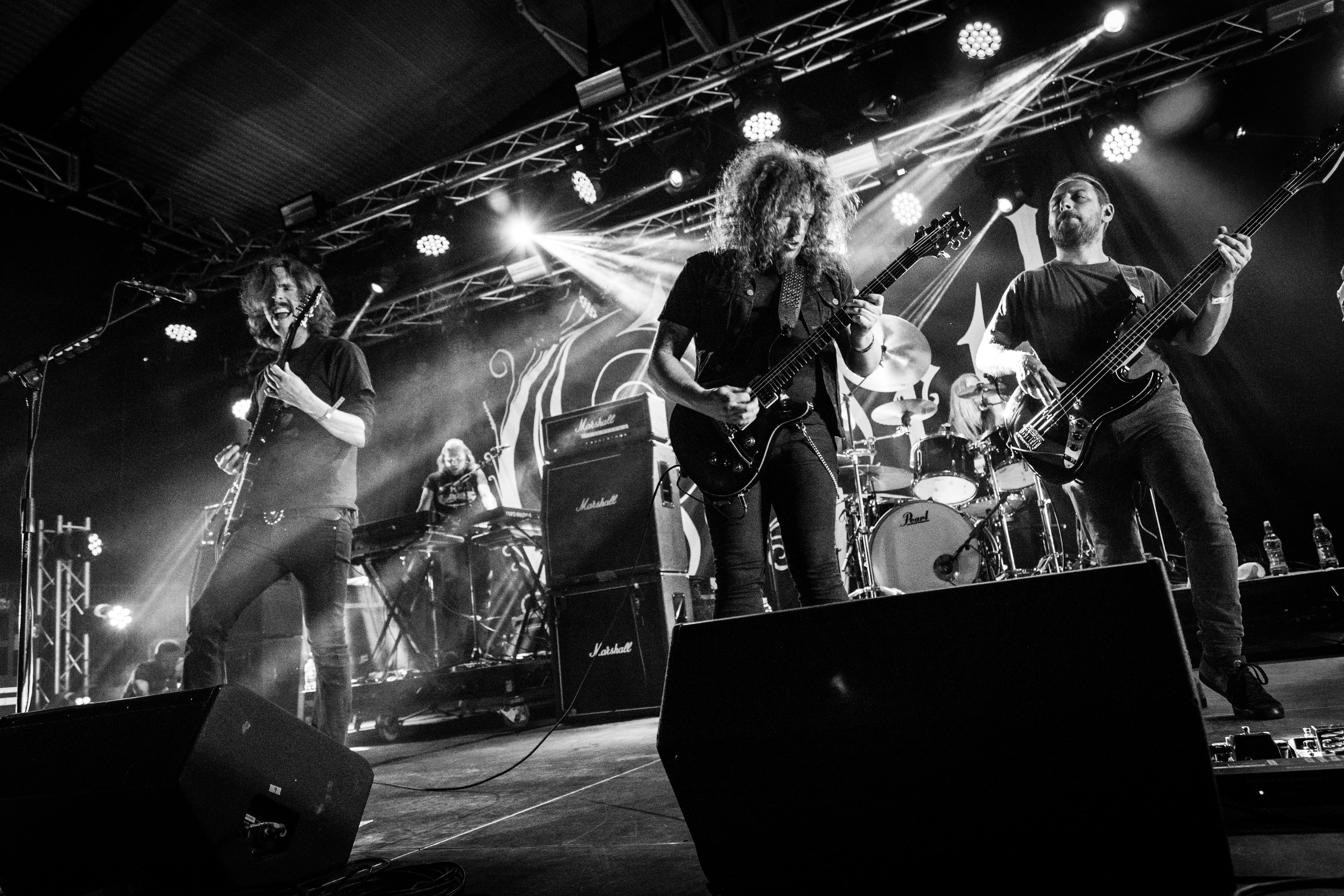
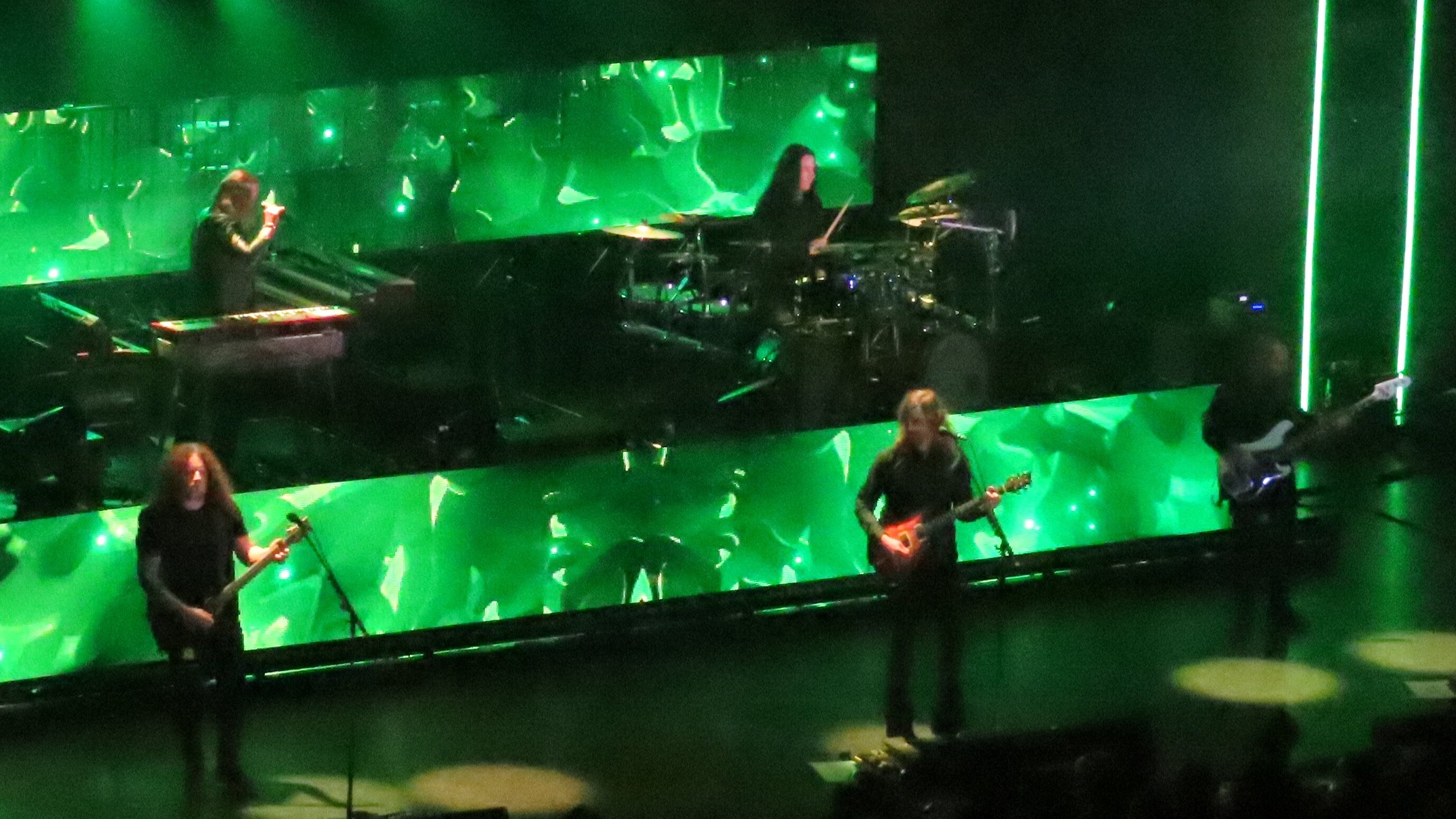
Opeth performing in 2016 and 2022

Opeth is a Swedish progressive metal band from Stockholm. Formed in 1990, the group originally featured vocalist David Isberg, guitarists Mikael "Micke" Bergström and Dan Nilsson, bassist Martin Persson, and drummer Amirion "Rille" Evén. Isberg invited Mikael Åkerfeldt to play bass later that year, who in 1992 would take over as frontman. The current lineup of Opeth features Åkerfeldt on guitars and lead vocals, Martín Méndez on bass (since 1997), Fredrik Åkesson on guitars and backing vocals (since 2007), Joakim Svalberg on keyboards and backing vocals (since 2011), and Waltteri Väyrynen on drums (since 2022).

== History ==
=== 1990–2003 ===
David Isberg formed Opeth in April 1990 with Mikael "Micke" Bergström, Dan Nilsson, Martin Persson and Amirion "Rille" Evén. During an early rehearsal, Isberg brought in Mikael Åkerfeldt to replace Persson on bass without informing the rest of the band, all of whom he fired following the event. The remaining pair of Isberg and Åkerfeldt completed the second lineup of Opeth with the addition of guitarist Andreas Dimeo, bassist Nick Döring and drummer Anders Nordin, and Åkerfeldt switched to guitar. Dimeo and Döring both left after the band's first show in February 1991, with Kim Pettersson and Johan De Farfalla (both members of local "sleazy metal" band Crimson Cat) taking their places. De Farfalla left after the group's second show, with Peter Lindgren joining on bass for a third performance later in the year, after which Petterson left and Lindgren switched to guitar. Founding frontman Isberg also left Opeth in early 1992 due to "creative differences". Åkerfeldt later recalled that "at the time, I thought [Isberg's departure] was good for the band, as he no longer seemed as interested as the rest of us".

Following Isberg's departure, Åkerfeldt took over as the lead vocalist of Opeth, and writing for a debut studio album began with Lindgren and Nordin. After a period as a three-piece, Mattias Ander briefly joined as the group's bassist, before Stefan Guteklint joined later in the year. Guteklint was fired by Åkerfeldt and Lindgren just over a year later, with former bassist De Farfalla returning for the recording of the group's debut album Orchid. After a tour in promotion of the group's second album Morningrise in 1996, Åkerfeldt and Lindgren fired De Farfalla without consulting Nordin, which also led to him leaving. Opeth briefly considered breaking up, before bringing in drummer Martin Lopez and later bassist Martín Méndez; bass on 1998's My Arms, Your Hearse was recorded by Åkerfeldt, as Méndez had joined too late to contribute.

=== Since 2003 ===
After the release of Damnation in 2003, which marked a change in the band's musical style to a more keyboard-heavy progressive rock-influenced sound, Opeth added Per Wiberg as a touring keyboardist. He later became an official member of the band in 2005. After suffering a string of stress-related illnesses and panic attacks, Lopez ceased performing with Opeth in August 2005, with Martin "Axe" Axenrot filling for a number of tours. By the following May the regular drummer had officially left the band, with Axenrot officially taking his place. Lindgren left the group a year later, stating that he had "lost some of the enthusiasm and inspiration needed to participate in [the] band". He was replaced by Fredrik Åkesson. In April 2011, it was announced that Wiberg had left the band. He was replaced by Joakim Svalberg.

The lineup of Åkerfeldt, Åkesson, Méndez, Axenrot and Svalberg remained stable for ten years, before it was announced in November 2021 that Axenrot had left the band due to a "conflict of interests". He was replaced for upcoming tour dates by Therion's Sami Karppinen, before former Paradise Lost drummer Waltteri Väyrynen joined as a full time replacement.

== Members ==
=== Current ===
Image	Name	Years active	Instruments	Release contributions
	Mikael Åkerfeldt	1990–present	lead vocals (since 1992); guitars; bass (1990, 1992, 1997); piano (1997, 2011); mellotron (2005, 2011)	all Opeth releases
	Martín Méndez	1997–present	bass; occasional backing vocals	all Opeth releases from Still Life (1999) onwards
	Fredrik Åkesson	2007–present	guitars; backing vocals	all Opeth releases from Watershed (2008) onwards
	Joakim Svalberg	2011–present	keyboards; backing vocals	all Opeth releases from Heritage (2011) onwards
	Waltteri Väyrynen	2022–present	drums; percussion; backing vocals	The Last Will and Testament (2024)

=== Former ===
Image	Name	Years active	Instruments	Release contributions
	David Isberg	1990–1992	vocals	none
	Mikael Bergström	1990	guitar	none
	Dan Nilsson	1990	guitar	none
	Martin Persson	1990	bass	none
	Amirion "Rille" Evén	1990	drums	none
	Anders Nordin	1990–1997	drums; percussion; piano (1994)	Orchid (1995); Morningrise (1996)
	Andreas Dimeo	1990–1991	guitars	none
	Nick Döring	1990–1991	bass	none
	Kim Pettersson	1991	guitars	none
	Johan De Farfalla	1991; 1994–1997	bass; backing vocals	Orchid (1995); Morningrise (1996)
	Peter Lindgren	1991–2007	guitars (from 1992); bass (1991–1992)	all Opeth releases from Orchid (1995) to The Roundhouse Tapes (2007)
	Mattias Ander	1992	bass	none
	Stefan Guteklint	1992–1994	bass	Orchid (1995) – 2000 reissue bonus track only; Morningrise (1996) – 2000 reissue bonus track only
	Martin Lopez	1997–2006	drums	all Opeth releases from My Arms, Your Hearse (1998) to Ghost Reveries (2005)
	Per Wiberg	2005–2011 (touring 2003–2005)	keyboards; backing vocals	all Opeth releases from Lamentations (2003) to Heritage (2011)
	Gene Hoglan	2004 (substitute)	drums	none
	Martin "Axe" Axenrot	2006–2021 (touring 2005–2006)	drums	all Opeth releases from The Roundhouse Tapes (2007) to In Cauda Venenum (2019)
	Sami Karppinen	2021–2022 (touring)	drums	none

=== Session ===
Image	Name	Years active	Instruments	Release contributions
	Fredrik Nordström	1997	engineering; Hammond organ	My Arms, Your Hearse (1998)
	Steven Wilson	2000; 2002; 2003; 2014	clean and backing vocals; piano; Mellotron; keyboards; additional guitars; production; engineering	Blackwater Park (2001); Deliverance (2002); Damnation (2003); Pale Communion (2014)
	Nathalie Lorichs	2007–2008	female vocals	Watershed (2008)
	Karin Svensson	2007–2008	violin	Watershed (2008)
	Andreas Tengberg	2007–2008	cello	Watershed (2008)
	Lisa Almberg	2007–2008	English horn; oboe	Watershed (2008)
	Christoffer Wadensten	2007–2008	flute	Watershed (2008)
	Björn J:son Lindh	2011 (died 2013)	flute	Heritage (2011)
	Alex Acuña	2011	percussion	Heritage (2011)
	Charlie Dodd	2011	sound effects	Heritage (2011)
	Dave Stewart	2014; 2024	string arrangements	Pale Communion (2014); The Last Will and Testament (2024)
	Wil Malone	2016	string arrangements	Sorceress (2016)
	Pascale Marie Vickery	2016	spoken words	Sorceress (2016)
	Mirjam Åkerfeldt	2024	spoken words	The Last Will and Testament (2024)
	Ian Anderson	2024	flute; spoken word	The Last Will and Testament (2024)
	Joey Tempest	2024	backing vocals	The Last Will and Testament (2024)
	Mia Westlund	2024	harp	The Last Will and Testament (2024)

== Lineups ==
Period	Members	Releases
1990	David Isberg – vocals; Mikael "Micke" Bergström – guitars; Dan Nilsson – guitars; Martin Persson – bass; Amirion "Rille" Evén – drums	none
1990	David Isberg – lead vocals; Mikael Åkerfeldt – bass, guitars, backing vocals	none
1990–1991	David Isberg – lead vocals; Mikael Åkerfeldt – guitars, backing vocals; Anders Nordin – drums; Andreas Dimeo – guitars; Nick Döring – bass	none
1991	David Isberg – lead vocals; Mikael Åkerfeldt – guitars, backing vocals; Anders Nordin – drums; Kim Pettersson – guitars; Johan De Farfalla – bass	none
1991	David Isberg – lead vocals; Mikael Åkerfeldt – guitars, backing vocals; Anders Nordin – drums; Kim Pettersson – guitars; Peter Lindgren – bass	none
1991 – early 1992	David Isberg – lead vocals; Mikael Åkerfeldt – guitars, backing vocals, bass; Anders Nordin – drums; Peter Lindgren – bass, guitars	none
1992	Mikael Åkerfeldt – guitars, lead vocals, bass; Anders Nordin – drums; Peter Lindgren – bass, guitars	none
1992	Mikael Åkerfeldt – guitars, vocals; Anders Nordin – drums; Peter Lindgren – guitars; Mattias Ander – bass	none
1992 – early 1994	Mikael Åkerfeldt – guitars, vocals; Anders Nordin – drums; Peter Lindgren – guitars; Stefan Guteklint – bass	Orchid (2000) – reissue bonus track; Morningrise (2000) – reissue bonus track
Early 1994 – spring 1997	Mikael Åkerfeldt – guitars, lead vocals; Anders Nordin – drums; Peter Lindgren – guitars; Johan De Farfalla – bass, backing vocals	Orchid (1995); Morningrise (1996)
Summer 1997	Mikael Åkerfeldt – guitars, vocals, bass, piano; Peter Lindgren – guitars; Martin Lopez – drums	My Arms, Your Hearse (1998)
Fall 1997 – June 2003	Mikael Åkerfeldt – guitars, vocals; Peter Lindgren – guitars; Martin Lopez – drums; Martín Méndez – bass	Still Life (1999); Blackwater Park (2001); Deliverance (2002); "Still Day Beneath the Sun" (2003); Damnation (2003)
June 2003 – May 2006	Mikael Åkerfeldt – guitars, lead vocals; Peter Lindgren – guitars; Martin Lopez – drums; Martín Méndez – bass; Per Wiberg – keyboards, backing vocals (was a touring member only until May 2005)	Lamentations (2003); Ghost Reveries (2005)
May 2006 – May 2007	Mikael Åkerfeldt – guitars, lead vocals; Peter Lindgren – guitars; Martín Méndez – bass; Per Wiberg – keyboards, backing vocals; Martin Axenrot – drums (had substituted for Lopez since August 2005)	The Roundhouse Tapes (2007)
May 2007 – April 2011	Mikael Åkerfeldt – guitars, lead vocals; Martín Méndez – bass; Per Wiberg – keyboards, backing vocals; Martin Axenrot – drums; Fredrik Åkesson – guitars, backing vocals	Watershed (2008); In Live Concert at the Royal Albert Hall (2010); "The Throat of Winter" (2011); Heritage (2011)
June 2011 – November 2021	Mikael Åkerfeldt – guitars, lead vocals; Martín Méndez – bass; Martin Axenrot – drums; Fredrik Åkesson – guitars, backing vocals; Joakim Svalberg – keyboards, backing vocals	Pale Communion (2014); Sorceress (2016); Garden of the Titans (2018); In Cauda Venenum (2019)
November 2021 – September 2022	Mikael Åkerfeldt – guitars, lead vocals; Martín Méndez – bass; Fredrik Åkesson – guitars, backing vocals; Joakim Svalberg – keyboards, backing vocals; Sami Karppinen – drums (touring only)	none
September 2022 – present	Mikael Åkerfeldt – guitars, lead vocals; Martín Méndez – bass; Fredrik Åkesson – guitars, backing vocals; Joakim Svalberg – keyboards, backing vocals; Waltteri Väyrynen – drums, percussion, backing vocals	The Last Will and Testament (2024)
