= In Live Concert at the Royal Albert Hall =

2010 live video album by Opeth

Live album / Video by Opeth
- Released: 20 September 2010
- Recorded: 5 April 2010
- Venues: Royal Albert Hall in London, England, UK
- Genres: Progressive death metal; progressive rock
- Length: 165:17
- Label: Roadrunner
- Producer: Jens Bogren

Opeth chronology
The Wooden Box (2009)	In Live Concert at the Royal Albert Hall (2010)	Heritage (2011)

Professional ratings
Review scores
Source	Rating
AllMusic	4/5 stars
Pitchfork	6.3/10

In Live Concert at the Royal Albert Hall is the third live album and video by Swedish progressive metal band Opeth. The DVD was recorded on 5 April 2010. It was released on 20 September 2010 in Europe and on 21 September 2010 in the rest of the world. The concert was part of the band's Evolution XX: An Opeth Anthology tour, made in celebration of their 20th anniversary, and was the fourth show of the tour, filmed at the prestigious Royal Albert Hall in London, UK.

== Release ==
The album is available in three configurations: one double-DVD including bonus features; a five-disc set that consists of two DVDs and three CDs; and a limited-edition vinyl box set which consists of the double-DVD, a set of four 180-gram LPs of the concert's live audio in its entirety, a numbered lithograph with artwork designed by the band's frontman Mikael Åkerfeldt and Travis Smith, and a 20-page booklet of photos of the event and exclusive artwork.

The concert performance was split into two sets for the DVD. The first set consists of the entire Blackwater Park album, while the second features one song from each of their other albums in chronological order, representing the twenty years of evolution in the band's music.

== Cover art ==
The cover art is purposely similar to that of Deep Purple's Concerto for Group and Orchestra, which was recorded at the same venue in 1969, "underlining the band's longstanding love for their prog-rock roots".

== Trivia ==
At some point during "The Lotus Eater", a camera man stepped on the power cord to Fredrik Åkesson's guitar amplifier, resulting in no sound coming out from Åkesson's guitar. This moment was kept on the recording.

== Track listing ==
=== DVD ===
Observation One – Blackwater Park
No.	Title	Length
1.	"The Leper Affinity"
2.	"Bleak"
3.	"Harvest"
4.	"The Drapery Falls"
5.	"Dirge for November"
6.	"The Funeral Portrait"
7.	"Patterns in the Ivy"
8.	"Blackwater Park"

Observation Two – A song from every other Opeth album in chronological order.
No.	Title	Album	Length
1.	"Forest of October"	Orchid
2.	"Advent"	Morningrise
3.	"April Ethereal"	My Arms, Your Hearse
4.	"The Moor"	Still Life
5.	"Wreath"	Deliverance
6.	"Hope Leaves"	Damnation
7.	"Harlequin Forest"	Ghost Reveries
8.	"The Lotus Eater"	Watershed

=== CD ===
Disc one
No.	Title	Length
1.	"The Leper Affinity"	10:07
2.	"Bleak"	8:53
3.	"Harvest"	6:10
4.	"The Drapery Falls"	10:07
5.	"Dirge for November"	8:28
6.	"The Funeral Portrait"	8:21
7.	"Patterns in the Ivy"	2:24
8.	"Blackwater Park"	12:32

Disc two
No.	Title	Album	Length
1.	"Forest of October"	Orchid	17:12
2.	"Advent"	Morningrise	15:03
3.	"April Ethereal"	My Arms, Your Hearse	10:22
4.	"The Moor"	Still Life	12:12

Disc three
No.	Title	Album	Length
1.	"Wreath"	Deliverance	12:24
2.	"Hope Leaves"	Damnation	6:48
3.	"Harlequin Forest"	Ghost Reveries	13:11
4.	"The Lotus Eater"	Watershed	11:09

== Personnel ==
- Mikael Åkerfeldt − guitar, vocals, mixing, direction
- Fredrik Åkesson − guitars, backing vocals
- Martín Méndez − bass guitar
- Per Wiberg − keyboards, backing vocals
- Martin "Axe" Axenrot – drums

== Charts ==
Chart (2010)	Peak position
German Albums (Offizielle Top 100)	59
Swedish Albums (Sverigetopplistan)	60

Chart (2016)	Peak position
Finnish Albums (Suomen virallinen lista)	5

Chart (2026)	Peak position
UK Independent Albums (Official Charts)	50
UK Rock & Metal Albums (Official Charts)	31
