= Collecter's Edition Slipcase =

Box set by Opeth
- Released: 17 October 2006
- Recorded: 2000–2003
- Length: 293:30
- Label: Koch
- Producer: Opeth, Mikael Åkerfeldt, Steven Wilson

Opeth chronology
Ghost Reveries (2005)	Collecter's Edition Slipcase (2006)	The Roundhouse Tapes (2007)

Professional ratings
Review scores
Source	Rating
AllMusic	3.5/5 stars

Collecter's Edition Slipcase (also printed as Collector's Edition Slipcase) is the first box set by Swedish progressive metal band Opeth. It contains the collection of three previous albums and a double live album.

== Track listing ==
- Disc 1: Blackwater Park
1. "The Leper Affinity" – 10:23
2. "Bleak" – 9:16
3. "Harvest" – 6:01
4. "The Drapery Falls" – 10:54
5. "Dirge for November" – 7:54
6. "The Funeral Portrait" – 8:44
7. "Patterns in the Ivy" – 1:53
8. "Blackwater Park" – 12:08
- Disc 2: Deliverance
1. "Wreath" – 11:10
2. "Deliverance" – 13:36
3. "A Fair Judgement" – 10:24
4. "For Absent Friends" – 2:17
5. "Master's Apprentices" – 10:32
6. "By the Pain I See in Others" – 13:51
- Disc 3: Damnation
1. "Windowpane" – 7:45
2. "In My Time of Need" – 5:50
3. "Death Whispered a Lullaby" – 5:50
4. "Closure" – 5:16
5. "Hope Leaves" – 4:30
6. "To Rid the Disease" – 6:21
7. "Ending Credits" – 3:40
8. "Weakness" – 4:10
- Discs 4 and 5: Lamentations (Live at Shepherd's Bush Empire 2003)
1. "Introduction" – 1:25
2. "Windowpane" – 9:15
3. "In My Time of Need" – 6:37
4. "Death Whispered a Lullaby" – 7:11
5. "Closure" – 9:45
6. "Hope Leaves" – 6:11
7. "To Rid the Disease" – 7:11
8. "Ending Credits" – 4:22
9. "Harvest" – 6:15
10. "Weakness" – 6:05
11. "Master's Apprentice" – 10:34
12. "The Drapery Falls" – 10:56
13. "Deliverance" – 12:38
14. "The Leper Affinity" – 11:01
15. "A Fair Judgement" – 13:51

== Personnel ==
=== Opeth ===
- Mikael Åkerfeldt − vocals, guitar
- Peter Lindgren − guitar
- Martin Lopez − drums
- Martin Mendez − bass

=== Guest musicians ===
==== Guest musicians on Blackwater Park ====
- Steven Wilson (Porcupine Tree) − vocals, guitar, piano
- Markus Lindberg

==== Guest musician on Deliverance ====
- Steven Wilson (Porcupine Tree) − backing vocals, guitars, Mellotron

==== Guest musician on Damnation ====
- Steven Wilson (Porcupine Tree) − Grand piano, Mellotron, Fender Rhodes, backing vocals, lyrics on "Death Whispered a Lullaby"

==== Guest musician on Lamentations ====
- Per Wiberg − keyboards, backing vocals
