= The Roundhouse Tapes =

Live album by Opeth
- Released: 23 October 2007
- Recorded: 9 November 2006
- Venue: The Roundhouse in London, England, UK
- Length: 96:12
- Label: Peaceville

Opeth chronology
Collecter's Edition Slipcase (2006)	The Roundhouse Tapes (2007)	Watershed (2008)

Professional ratings
Review scores
Source	Rating
About.com	4/5 stars
AllMusic	3.5/5 stars
Alternative Press	3/5 stars
Aquarian Weekly	A+
Metal Underground	3.5/5 stars
Pitchfork	7/10 stars

The Roundhouse Tapes is the second live album and video by Swedish progressive metal band Opeth. The CD was recorded on 9 November 2006 and was released on 23 October 2007 in the US, on 5 November in Europe, and on 20 November in the rest of the world. A two-disc DVD version was released on 10 November 2008, and includes exclusive menu music written by Mikael Åkerfeldt and Per Wiberg. The title is a play on the name of Iron Maiden's first release The Soundhouse Tapes, as well as the venue where the record was recorded. Åkerfeldt said, "The Roundhouse concert will always be a very memorable gig for us for many reasons, but most importantly it caught the band at the peak of the Ghost Reveries tour". This is the final Opeth release with Peter Lindgren.

== Track listing ==
All lyrics are written by Åkerfeldt; all music is composed by Mikael Åkerfeldt except where noted.

Disc One
No.	Title	Music	Album	Length
1.	"When"		My Arms, Your Hearse	10:28
2.	"Ghost of Perdition"		Ghost Reveries	10:57
3.	"Under the Weeping Moon"	Åkerfeldt; Peter Lindgren	Orchid	10:28
4.	"Bleak"		Blackwater Park	8:39
5.	"Face of Melinda"		Still Life	9:58
6.	"The Night and the Silent Water"	Åkerfeldt; Lindgren	Morningrise	10:29

Disc Two
No.	Title	Music	Album	Length
1.	"Windowpane"		Damnation	8:01
2.	"Blackwater Park"	Åkerfeldt; Lindgren	Blackwater Park	18:59
3.	"Demon of the Fall"	Åkerfeldt; Lindgren	My Arms, Your Hearse	8:14

DVD
No.	Title	Length
1.	"When"	10:28
2.	"Ghost of Perdition"	10:57
3.	"Under the Weeping Moon"	10:28
4.	"Bleak"	8:39
5.	"Face of Melinda"	9:58
6.	"The Night and the Silent Water"	10:29
7.	"Windowpane"	8:01
8.	"Blackwater Park"	19:00
9.	"Demon of the Fall"	8:14

The DVD also features fan and band interviews, sound-check footage and a photo gallery of the concert.

== Personnel ==
=== Opeth ===
- Mikael Åkerfeldt – guitar, vocals, mixing, direction
- Peter Lindgren – guitar
- Martín Méndez – bass guitar
- Per Wiberg – keyboards, backing vocals
- Martin "Axe" Axenrot – drums

=== Additional personnel ===
- Jens Bogren – mixing
- Travis Smith – cover artwork, album design, model, photography
- Heather Elizabeth – photography
- Daniel Falk – photography

== Charts ==
Chart (2007)	Peak position
French Albums (SNEP)	176
UK Independent Albums (OCC)	11
UK Rock & Metal Albums (OCC)	14
