= The Wooden Box (album) =

Box set by Opeth
- Released: 26 February 2009
- Recorded: Unisound Studios, spring 1994; Unisound Studios, winter 1996; Studio Fredman & Maestro Musik, summer 1997
- Label: Viva Hate
- Producer: Opeth, Dan Swanö, Fredrik Nordström, Anders Fridén

Opeth chronology
The Candlelight Years (2008)	The Wooden Box (2009)	In Live Concert at the Royal Albert Hall (2010)

The Wooden Box is the third box set by Swedish progressive metal band Opeth. It contains first three albums: Orchid, Morningrise and My Arms, Your Hearse.

== Contents ==
The records come in a handcrafted wooden box with album details printed/burned on it. The box holds an Opeth logo stencil, six 180g vinyl records (two per album) limited to 200 copies pressed on white vinyl, alternate artwork containing embossed logos and album details printed on transparent paper.

== Track listing ==
Orchid Side A
No.	Title	Length
1.	"In Mist She Was Standing"	14:09
2.	"Under the Weeping Moon"	9:52

Orchid Side B
No.	Title	Length
3.	"Silhouette"	3:07
4.	"Forest of October"	13:04

Orchid Side C
No.	Title	Length
1.	"The Twilight Is My Robe"	11:03
2.	"Requiem"	1:11

Orchid Side D
No.	Title	Length
3.	"The Apostle in Triumph"	13:02
4.	"Into the Frost of Winter (Demo)" (bonus track)	6:20

Morningrise Side A
No.	Title	Length
1.	"Advent"	13:45

Morningrise Side B
No.	Title	Length
2.	"The Night and the Silent Water"	11:00
3.	"Nectar"	10:09

Morningrise Side C
No.	Title	Length
1.	"Black Rose Immortal"	20:14

Morningrise Side D
No.	Title	Length
2.	"To Bid You Farewell"	10:57
3.	"Eternal Soul Torture (Demo)" (bonus track)	8:35

My Arms, Your Hearse Side A
No.	Title	Length
1.	"Prologue"	0:59
2.	"April Ethereal"	8:41
3.	"When"	9:14

My Arms, Your Hearse Side B
No.	Title	Length
4.	"Madrigal"	1:25
5.	"The Amen Corner"	8:43
6.	"Demon of the Fall"	6:13

My Arms, Your Hearse Side C
No.	Title	Length
1.	"Credence"	5:26
2.	"Karma"	7:52

My Arms, Your Hearse Side D
No.	Title	Length
3.	"Epilogue"	3:59
4.	"Circle of the Tyrants" (Celtic Frost cover) (bonus track)	5:12
5.	"Remember Tomorrow" (Iron Maiden cover) (bonus track)	5:00

== Personnel ==
Recorded	Album	Credits
1994	Orchid	Mikael Åkerfeldt – acoustic guitar, electric guitar, vocals; Johan De Farfalla – acoustic guitar, bass guitar, electric guitar, backing vocals; Peter Lindgren – acoustic guitar, electric guitar; Anders Nordin – percussion, piano, drums; Opeth – production, artwork; Dan Swanö – engineering
1996	Morningrise	Mikael Åkerfeldt – vocals, electric guitar, acoustic guitar; Peter Lindgren – electric guitar, acoustic guitar; Johan DeFarfalla – bass guitar; Anders Nordin – drums, percussion; Opeth – production, artwork; Dan Swanö – production, engineering
1998	My Arms, Your Hearse	Mikael Åkerfeldt – vocals, guitar, bass guitar, piano ("Prologue"), production; Peter Lindgren – guitar; Martin Lopez – drums; Fredrik Nordström – engineering, production, Hammond organ ("Epilogue")
