= The Candlelight Years =

Box set by Opeth
- Released: 28 June 2008
- Recorded: 1992–1997
- Length: 209:15
- Label: Candlelight
- Producer: Opeth, Dan Swanö, Fredrik Nordström, Anders Fridén

Opeth chronology
Watershed (2008)	The Candlelight Years (2008)	The Wooden Box (2009)

Professional ratings
Review scores
Source	Rating
AllMusic	4/5 stars

The Candlelight Years is the second box set by Swedish progressive metal band Opeth. It compiles their first three albums Orchid, Morningrise, and My Arms, Your Hearse, originally released on Candlelight Records. Although the albums have been released (and even re-released) before, this was the first time they have been collected in one set. It also marks the first time the albums were released in Japan.

The box set was released on 28 June 2008 and is presented in fold-out digipak packaging. This edition was limited to 2000 copies. The set was re-released on 25 August 2009 in a standard 3-disc jewel casing.

== Track listing ==
=== Orchid ===
1. "In Mist She Was Standing" (Mikael Åkerfeldt, Peter Lindgren) – 14:09
2. "Under the Weeping Moon" (Åkerfeldt) – 9:52
3. "Silhouette" (Anders Nordin) – 3:07
4. "Forest of October" (Åkerfeldt, Lindgren) – 13:04
5. "The Twilight Is My Robe" (Åkerfeldt, Lindgren) – 11:03
6. "Requiem" (Åkerfeldt, Nordin) – 1:11
7. "The Apostle in Triumph" (Åkerfeldt, Lindgren) – 13:01
8. "Into the Frost of Winter" (bonus demo track) – 6:20

=== Morningrise ===
1. "Advent" (Mikael Åkerfeldt, Peter Lindgren) – 13:45
2. "The Night and the Silent Water" (Åkerfeldt, Lindgren) – 11:00
3. "Nectar" (Åkerfeldt, Lindgren) – 10:09
4. "Black Rose Immortal" (Åkerfeldt, Lindgren) – 20:14
5. "To Bid You Farewell" (Åkerfeldt, Lindgren) – 10:57
6. "Eternal Soul Torture" (bonus demo track) (Åkerfeldt, Lindgren) – 8:35

=== My Arms, Your Hearse ===
1. "Prologue" (Opeth) – 1:01
2. "April Ethereal" (Opeth) – 8:41
3. "When" (Opeth) – 9:14
4. "Madrigal" (Opeth) – 1:26
5. "The Amen Corner" (Opeth) – 8:43
6. "Demon of the Fall" (Opeth) – 6:13
7. "Credence" (Opeth) – 5:26
8. "Karma" (Opeth) – 7:52
9. "Epilogue" (Opeth) – 3:59
10. "Circle of the Tyrant" (bonus Celtic Frost cover) (Celtic Frost) – 5:12
11. "Remember Tomorrow" (bonus Iron Maiden cover) (Iron Maiden) – 5:00

== Personnel ==
=== Orchid and Morningrise ===
- Mikael Åkerfeldt – vocals, guitar, acoustic guitar
- Peter Lindgren – guitar, acoustic guitar
- Johan De Farfalla – bass guitar, backing vocals
- Anders Nordin – drums, percussion, piano

=== My Arms, Your Hearse ===
- Mikael Åkerfeldt – vocals, guitar, bass guitar
- Peter Lindgren – guitar
- Martin Lopez – drums
- Fredrik Nordström – engineering, production, Hammond organ (on "Epilogue")
- Anders Fridén – co-production
