= Lamentations (Live at Shepherd's Bush Empire 2003) =

Video by Opeth
- Released: 24 November 2003
- Recorded: 25 September 2003
- Venue: Shepherd's Bush Empire in London, England, UK
- Genre: Progressive rock, progressive death metal, progressive metal
- Length: 121:41 (CD); 187:09 (DVD)
- Label: Music For Nations / Koch

Opeth chronology
Damnation (2003)	Lamentations (Live at Shepherd's Bush Empire 2003) (2003)	Ghost Reveries (2005)

Lamentations (Live at Shepherds Bush Empire 2003) is the first live album and video by Swedish progressive metal band Opeth, released under the Music For Nations label in 2003. It was recorded at the Shepherd's Bush Empire on 25 September 2003.

Lamentations features Opeth playing the album Damnation in its entirety (with the song "Harvest" from Blackwater Park put in the running order before the last song), followed by some of the band's songs from Blackwater Park and Deliverance. The only song that was played from albums prior to Blackwater Park was "Demon of the Fall" (from the album My Arms, Your Hearse) as an encore song, but the song was not filmed for the DVD. Licensing issues with previous record labels prevented this from happening at the time of the disc's release.

The DVD also includes a documentary on the making of both Damnation and Deliverance because both albums were recorded at the same time.

This was the first Opeth release with Per Wiberg, although he did not become a permanent band member until Ghost Reveries.

A 2-disc CD version of the live recording was released in 2006 in a collector's edition slipcase.

A 3-disc vinyl version with new cover artwork was released in July, 2016.

== DVD ==
No.	Title	Release	Length
1.	"Windowpane"	Damnation	9:15
2.	"In My Time of Need"	Damnation	6:37
3.	"Death Whispered a Lullaby"	Damnation	7:11
4.	"Closure"	Damnation	9:44
5.	"Hope Leaves"	Damnation	6:11
6.	"To Rid the Disease"	Damnation	7:11
7.	"Ending Credits"	Damnation	4:22
8.	"Harvest"	Blackwater Park	6:15
9.	"Weakness"	Damnation	6:04
10.	"Master's Apprentices"	Deliverance	10:34
11.	"The Drapery Falls"	Blackwater Park	10:56
12.	"Deliverance"	Deliverance	12:38
13.	"The Leper Affinity"	Blackwater Park	11:01
14.	"A Fair Judgement"	Deliverance	13:51

Documentary
No.	Title	Release	Length
1.	"The Making of Deliverance and Damnation"	Lamentations (Live at Shepherd's Bush Empire 2003)	65:21

== CD track listing ==
Disc 1
No.	Title	Album	Length
1.	"Intro"	Lamentations (Live at Shepherd's Bush Empire 2003)	1:25
2.	"Windowpane"	Damnation	9:15
3.	"In My Time of Need"	Damnation	6:37
4.	"Death Whispered a Lullaby"	Damnation	7:11
5.	"Closure"	Damnation	9:44
6.	"Hope Leaves"	Damnation	6:11
7.	"To Rid the Disease"	Damnation	7:11
8.	"Ending Credits"	Damnation	4:22
9.	"Harvest"	Blackwater Park	6:15
10.	"Weakness"	Damnation	6:04

Disc 2
No.	Title	Album	Length
1.	"Master's Apprentices"	Deliverance	11:20
2.	"The Drapery Falls"	Blackwater Park	10:56
3.	"Deliverance"	Deliverance	12:40
4.	"The Leper Affinity"	Blackwater Park	11:01
5.	"A Fair Judgement"	Deliverance	13:50

== Reception ==
Professional ratings
Review scores
Source	Rating
AllMusic	4/5 stars
Pitchfork Media	8.9/10

The recording is generally regarded as having exceptionally clear and beautiful sound and visual quality, although Allmusic reviewer John Serba complained of the ubiquity of shots from what he termed the "Åkerfeldt Orifice Cam", showing close-ups of the singer's mouth and nose in excruciating detail.

== Personnel ==
=== Opeth ===
- Mikael Åkerfeldt – lead vocals, lead guitar; songwriting (1–3, 5–14), music (4)
- Peter Lindgren – rhythm guitar
- Martín Méndez – bass guitar
- Martin Lopez – drums

With

- Per Wiberg – keyboards and backing vocals

=== DVD & Album Production ===
- Paul McLoone – production
- Benje Noble – 5.1 & Dts audio post production
- Louise Cassidy – production assisting
- Andy Sneap – recording and mixing
- Fredrik Odefjärd – editing, filming and production on Documentary

=== Imaging ===
- Rigel Lastrella – DVD package design US artwork
- Travis Smith – photography and artwork

=== Show Production ===
- Matt West – live sound engineering
- Steve Taylor – vision engineering
- Benny Trickett – vision mixing
- Ben Gill – broadcast assisting
- Joe Dyer – director
- Liam Donoghue – project co-ordination

=== Technicians ===
==== Drum technicians ====
- Damon Dougherty
- Mole

==== Guitar technician ====
- Coty Alinson

=== Various ===
- Steven Wilson – lyrics on "Death Whispered a Lullaby"

==== Running ====
- Jane Costello
- Jonathan Nicholas

==== Gripping ====
- Neil Grey

==== Op Cable Rigging ====
- Nigel Clarke
- Zoran Trajkovic

=== Lights ===
- Mick Thornton – lighting design
- Tellson James – lighting operation

=== Camera Crew ===
==== Assistants ====
- Mark Cowley
- Tony Lewis

==== Operators ====
- Andy Pellet
- Ben Grewin
- Curtis Dunn
- John Clarke
- Martin Mathews
- Samantha Dewhurst

=== Management ===
- Guy Moore – contract management
- Gavin Bot – floor management
- Steve Waite – tour management

==== Agents ====
- Tim Borror
- Tobbe Lorentz
