= Blackwater Park (disambiguation) =

Blackwater Park is a 2001 album by Swedish progressive death metal band Opeth.

Blackwater Park may also refer to:

- the name of the gothic mansion in Wilkie Collins's The Woman in White
- Blackwater Park (band), German band
- "Blackwater Park", a song by Opeth on Blackwater Park
