= Plays and Sings the Blues =

Plays and Sings the Blues may refer to:

- Plays and Sings the Blues, album by John Lee Hooker
- Plays and Sings the Blues, album by David Isberg and Dubplate Connection 2009
