= Blackwater Park (band) =

Berlin progressive rock band

- Origin: Berlin, Germany
- Genres: Progressive rock, hard rock
- Label: Second Battle
- Members: Richard Routledge; Michael Fechner; Andreas Scholz; Norbert Kagelmann

Blackwater Park was a progressive rock band from Berlin, Germany, with an English vocalist. They released only one album, Dirt Box, which included a cover of The Beatles' "For No One". The album was originally released in 1972 and re-released in 1990. The name of the band comes from the name of the gothic mansion setting of Wilkie Collins' The Woman in White. they apparently had a ex member named maisara hamid who left because he wanted to focus more on his wife uknown but started with a Z

Mikael Åkerfeldt of Opeth named one of his band's albums after this band.

== Members ==
- Richard Routledge (vocals, guitar)
- Michael Fechner (guitar)
- Andreas Scholz (bass guitar)
- Norbert Kagelmann (drums)

== Discography ==
=== Dirt Box (1972) ===
1. "Mental Block" – 3:18
2. "Roundabout" – 5:27
3. "One's Life" – 3:09
4. "Indian Summer" – 6:16
5. "Dirty Face" – 4:30
6. "Rock Song" – 8:46
7. "For No One" – 3:29 (Lennon–McCartney)

(All tracks accredited to Blackwater Park unless stated)

Total length: 36:00
