= Ghost Reveries =

Studio album by Opeth
- Released: 29 August 2005
- Recorded: 15 March – 1 June 2005
- Studios: Fascination Street Studios (Örebro, Sweden)
- Genres: Progressive metal; progressive death metal
- Length: 66:46
- Label: Roadrunner
- Producers: Mikael Åkerfeldt; Jens Bogren

Opeth chronology
Damnation (2003)	Ghost Reveries (2005)	Collecter's Edition Slipcase (2006)

Singles from Ghost Reveries
- 1. "The Grand Conjuration" Released: 26 July 2005

Ghost Reveries is the eighth studio album by Swedish progressive metal band Opeth. It was released on 29 August 2005. It was their first album after signing with Roadrunner Records, and first album since Still Life (1999) to not be produced by Steven Wilson.

Ghost Reveries is the first album by Opeth to include keyboardist Per Wiberg as a "permanent" member (although Wiberg contributed keyboard work to Opeth's live performances starting around the time of Lamentations), and it is the last Opeth album to include drummer Martin Lopez and long-time guitarist Peter Lindgren.

The album's only single is "The Grand Conjuration". A music video of the song was released, although about half of the song was edited from the video, due to the length of the song. Lopez does not appear in the video, as he was sick and was temporarily replaced by Gene Hoglan.

== Background ==
Opeth returned home in 2004 to start writing new material for its eighth album; by the end of the year, they had finished writing it. For the first time since Still Life, the songs for Ghost Reveries were written for the album before going into the studio. This gave Opeth three weeks to rehearse and perfect the recording in the studio. The band had to decide whether to record the album at Fascination Street Studios in Örebro, Sweden, or at Sonic Ranch. They eventually chose Fascination Street Studios, as it was closer to their homes.

Opeth's European label, Music for Nations, closed its doors in 2005. After negotiations with various labels, the band signed with Roadrunner Records. Åkerfeldt said the primary reason for signing with Roadrunner was the label's wide distribution, ensuring the album would be available at larger-chain retailers. When news leaked that the band was signed to Roadrunner, who predominantly worked with trend-oriented rock and metal, some fans accused the band of selling out. "To be honest," Åkerfeldt said, "that's such an insult after 15 years as a band and 8 records. I can't believe we haven't earned each and every Opeth fan's credibility after all these years. I mean, our songs are 10 minutes long!"

== Style ==
The album marks a return to the progressive metal styles of the previous albums and features death growls. However, it still includes some of the progressive rock elements of Damnation.

Ghost Reveries was initially intended to be a concept album, with numerous tracks linking together a story of a man's turmoil after committing an unconscionable act, symbolised by killing his own mother. However, Mikael Åkerfeldt commented:

"I had intended to do a occult concept piece lyrically and got off to a great start with some downright evil lyrics like "The Baying of the Hounds" and "Ghost of Perdition", then I did "Isolation Years" which had nothing to do with the intended concept but I liked it so much I decided to ease up on the concept idea in favour of this one lyric. Why I decided on a occult theme? Well, I've always been intrigued by it, especially Satanism and stuff like that. I studied some books that oddly enough my wife had in her collection like "Servants of Satan" as well as "Witchcraft and Sorcery" + some more. I figured it'd be interesting to see what a mature 31 year old mind would make of this subject as opposed to the 16 year old kid who used to pose in front of his Bathory poster. I'm quite happy with them to be honest, and they're ... evil!"

The album only partly portrays a concept, not fully arranged in the poetic manner as previous releases such as Still Life and My Arms, Your Hearse.

Many of the album's tracks make use of an unusual open Dmadd9 guitar tuning, in contrast to the rest of the band's material, which is largely played in standard tuning.

"The Baying of the Hounds" is partially inspired by lyrics from the song "Diana" from Comus's album First Utterance.

== Artwork ==
The artwork was created after the completion of the album. Åkerfeldt commented on the artwork, saying:

"I'd been looking for one of the old medieval looking woodcuts, me and Peter went to the Royal library here in Stockholm looking for a evil (yep!) picture, but that was like searching for a needle in a haystack. Couldn't find one. In the meantime, I'd received some pics from good ol' Travis Smith. And as per usual with Mr. Smith, he's a genius ... the candle pictures just blew me away ... that's the cover, fuck the woodcuts! I love it! It's probably the most gothic looking cover we've had, right?"

== Release ==
Ghost Reveries was released in Europe on 29 August 2005, and in North America on 30 August 2005.

A special edition of the album was released by Roadrunner Records on 31 October 2006. It is packaged in a large digipak and contains a CD and DVD, along with new cover art and an extended booklet featuring extra album artwork and a letter from Åkerfeldt. The CD contains the original tracks from the album, as well as a bonus cover of "Soldier of Fortune" by Deep Purple, which was recorded as a live take with the band's new drummer, Martin Axenrot. The DVD contains a Dolby 5.1 surround sound mix (not including the bonus track), a 40-minute documentary, and the video for "The Grand Conjuration". This documentary details the making of Ghost Reveries, offering a behind-the-scenes look at the band's day-to-day life while recording and touring.

Some copies of Ghost Reveries were mastered using HDCD. Although it is unmarked, playing the album in a CD player able to decode HDCD will give superior sound quality.

"Ghost of Perdition" is included in the soundtrack for the video game Saints Row 2 on the radio station Krunch 106.66. As of 29 November 2011, it is also available for download for the video game Rock Band 3. "The Grand Conjuration" is included in the soundtrack for the video game Sleeping Dogs, on the radio station "roadrunner records". It is also included in the soundtrack for the video game Final Fight: Streetwise, being the boss battle theme song of one of the game's bosses, Famine.

=== Release history ===
Date	Release
29 August 2005	Europe
30 August 2005	United States

== Reception ==
Professional ratings
Review scores
Source	Rating
AllMusic	5/5 stars
Alternative Press	5/5 stars
Blabbermouth.net	10/10
Drowned in Sound	10/10
Kerrang!	5/5 stars
Pitchfork	8.4/10
PopMatters	9/10
Rock Hard	9/10
Rock Sound	9/10
Stylus Magazine	B
Terrorizer	9.5/10

Ghost Reveries peaked on the Billboard 200 at number 64 and number 62 in the UK. The album was Opeth's first studio release to chart in Sweden, reaching number nine.

Ghost Reveries received widespread acclaim upon release. Thom Jurek of AllMusic cited Ghost Reveries as a culmination of everything Opeth had worked towards throughout their career. Jurek defined the album as "fully realized, stunningly beautiful, and emotionally fragmented; it's a terrain where power, tenderness, and sheer grief hold forth under heavy manners. Awesome." Billboard described the album as delving further towards Opeth's progressive tendencies, commenting that the "alternating between powerful metal bursts and gauzy atmospheres requires patient listening, but it allows for better exploration of the beautifully dark world Opeth creates." Brandon Stosuy of Pitchfork praised Opeth's diverse musical influences and instrumentation, as a blend of "prog, jazz, stoner haze, blues-rock, Indian raga, pastoral tips, and acid-tinged freakers." Exclaim! reviewer Max Deneau similarly praised their songwriting and musicianship as key to Opeth's formula, whilst commenting on the addition of keyboardist Per Wiberg as having added "a volatile new dynamic to the band." Keith Bergman of Blabbermouth.net gave the album ten out of ten, one of only 21 albums to achieve a perfect rating from the site. Decibel called Ghost Reveries "achingly beautiful, sometimes unabashedly brutal, often a combination of both." The Aquarian Weekly placed Ghost Reveries among the band's finest work, writing: "This record was in the running for best metal release of the year before it even came out and now that it has, it may very well have decimated any competition."

Ghost Reveries was named the best album of 2005 by Metal Hammer. It was also ranked No. 1 on PopMatters "Best Metal Albums of 2005" and on webzine Metal Storm. Ghost Reveries appeared on many end of year lists, including Kerrang!, Terrorizer, Drowned In Sound and The Village Voice's Pazz & Jop poll. In a retrospective list, Loudwire named it the best metal album of 2005.

In 2014, TeamRock put Ghost Reveries at No. 46 on their "Top 100 Greatest Prog Albums of All Time" list commenting that "this was a partial concept album, with Satanism as its theme. It’s now regarded as one of the defining albums of 21st-century progressive metal." Loudwire placed the album at No. 3 on their "Top 100 Hard Rock and Heavy Metal Albums of the 21st Century" list, only being beaten out by System of a Down's Toxicity (#2) and Tool's Lateralus (#1).

== Track listing ==
All tracks are written by Mikael Åkerfeldt except “Beneath the Mire” and “The Grand Conjuration” by Åkerfeldt/Wiberg.

No.	Title	Length
1.	"Ghost of Perdition"	10:29
2.	"The Baying of the Hounds"	10:41
3.	"Beneath the Mire"	7:57
4.	"Atonement"	6:28
5.	"Reverie/Harlequin Forest (Note: "Reverie" appears after 5:23 in "Atonement" and is 1:05 in length. On some CD versions, it appears in the pregap between "Atonement" and "Harlequin Forest". On the digital version and some CD pressings, the pregap has just been added to the end of "Atonement", but the song titles remain the same, causing some confusion.)"	11:39
6.	"Hours of Wealth"	5:20
7.	"The Grand Conjuration"	10:21
8.	"Isolation Years"	3:51
Total length:		66:46

== Personnel ==
=== Opeth ===
- Mikael Åkerfeldt – vocals, rhythm guitar, lead guitar, acoustic guitar, Mellotron
- Peter Lindgren – lead guitar
- Martín Méndez – bass
- Per Wiberg – Hammond organ, Mellotron, grand piano, Moog
- Martin Lopez – drums, percussion

=== Production ===
- Jens Bogren – production, engineering, mixing, mastering (at Cutting Room Studios), 5.1 remix
- Mikael Åkerfeldt – production, engineering, mixing, mastering, art direction, recording ("Soldier of Fortune")
- Pontus Olsson – engineering ("Soldier of Fortune"), mixing ("Soldier of Fortune")
- Rickard Bengtsson – recording
- Anders Alexandersson – recording
- Niklas Källgren – recording
- Thomas Eberger – mastering

=== Additional personnel ===
- Travis Smith – art direction, illustration, layout
- Anthony Sorrento – band portraits

== Charts ==
=== Weekly ===
Chart (2005)	Peak position
Australian Albums (ARIA)	35
Dutch Albums (Album Top 100)	38
Finnish Albums (Suomen virallinen lista)	10
French Albums (SNEP)	72
German Albums (Offizielle Top 100)	35
Italian Albums (FIMI)	52
Norwegian Albums (VG-lista)	21
Polish Albums (ZPAV)	39
Scottish Albums (Official Charts)	63
Swedish Albums (Sverigetopplistan)	9
UK Albums (OCC)	62
UK Rock & Metal Albums (Official Charts)	5
US Billboard 200	64

=== Monthly ===
Chart (2005)	Peak position
Poland (ZPAV Top 100)	38
