= Johan De Farfalla =

Swedish bass player

- Born: 3 June 1971 (age 55); Stockholm
- Genres: Progressive metal, black metal, progressive rock, death metal
- Occupation: Musician
- Instrument: Bass guitar
- Years active: 1991–97
- Label: Candlelight
- Formerly of: Opeth
- Website: opeth.com

Johan De Farfalla (born 3 June 1971) is a Swedish bass player. He is the former bassist of seminal Swedish progressive metal band Opeth.

De Farfalla was born in Stockholm. He originally joined Opeth in 1991 when its lineup was David Isberg on vocals, Mikael Åkerfeldt and Kim Pettersson on guitar, and Anders Nordin on drums. He replaced Nick Döring on bass for one show and quit immediately afterwards. Opeth recruited Peter Lindgren to replace him for their next show, and then Stefan Guteklint after Lindgren moved to guitar. In 1994, Opeth was approached for signing by Candlelight Records, and fired Guteklint. De Farfalla rejoined Opeth initially as a session bassist for their first album Orchid (1995), but subsequently became an official member again. After touring in support of their second album Morningrise (1996), De Farfalla was fired by Åkerfeldt who cited that he was not a good fit.

De Farfalla used to work as a teacher at Storviks Folkhögskola until 27 January 2012. Afterwards he became a principal at Tollare Folkhögskola until June 2015. He now works as a manager at JSC (Järfälla Språk Center) and lives in Stockholm with his three children.
