= Orchid (Opeth album) =

Studio album by Opeth
- Released: 15 May 1995
- Recorded: March 1994
- Studio: Unisound (Finspång, Sweden)
- Genre: Progressive death metal
- Length: 65:26
- Label: Candlelight; Century Black
- Producer: Dan Swanö; Opeth

Opeth chronology
Orchid (1995)	Morningrise (1996)

Orchid is the debut studio album by Swedish progressive metal band Opeth, released on 15 May 1995 in Europe by Candlelight Records, and on 24 June 1997 in the United States by Century Black. It was reissued in 2000 with one bonus track, "Into the Frost of Winter", an early, unproduced rehearsal recording by the band. The recording sessions took place at the old Unisound studio in Finspång, with production handled by Opeth and Dan Swanö. The band did not record a demo to secure a record label deal. Instead, Lee Barrett, the founder of Candlelight Records, was impressed by an Opeth rehearsal tape and decided to sign the band. The album received critical acclaim.

== Background ==
Opeth was formed in 1990 in Stockholm, Sweden, by David Isberg. Isberg invited Mikael Åkerfeldt (formerly of the recently disbanded band Eruption) to join Opeth. The other band members objected to this and quit, leaving only Isberg and Åkerfeldt. Anders Nordin, Nick Döring, and Andreas Dimeo were brought in as replacements. They rehearsed in an elementary school using old '60s equipment they found there. Opeth performed a show in February 1991 alongside Therion, Excruciate, and Authorise in Stockholm. Their set consisted of only two songs. Åkerfeldt later reflected on the performance: "I reckon it was probably the worst appearance one can have witnessed. We were so fucking nervous that we all wanted to cancel the fucking gig and just go back home."

The band played a second show in Gothenburg. By that time, Döring and Dimeo had left, prompting Opeth to recruit Kim Pettersson and Johan DeFarfalla from the band Crimson Cat to join them onstage. The event also featured performances by At the Gates, Therion, Desecrator, Megaslaughter, and Sarcazm. Following the show, DeFarfalla left to spend time with his girlfriend. Åkerfeldt then invited his friend Peter Lindgren, who was playing in a joke band called Sylt i krysset, to join Opeth as a bassist. Lindgren agreed, wanting a more serious project. Pettersson also left the band, leading Lindgren to switch to guitar. Isberg departed in 1992 due to creative differences. Åkerfeldt became the new vocalist, and he and Lindgren began writing new material. They rehearsed as a three-piece for over a year. Stefan Guteklint joined as bassist but left shortly after the band signed with Candlelight Records in 1994.

Opeth secured a deal with Candlelight Records without recording a demo. For the band, entering a studio to produce a demo was as significant an undertaking as recording an album. Åkerfeldt explained: "We didn't have any money to spend on things like that. That would cost us, at least, a couple of hundred bucks... We didn't know where to go to record a demo." Åkerfeldt had sent rehearsal tapes to several labels but received no replies. However, Lee Barrett from Candlelight offered to produce an album, a proposal Åkerfeldt found "quite weird." Anders Nyström (of Katatonia) revealed that Candlelight's interest was sparked by a rumor from Samoth (of Emperor), who had included a few seconds of "The Apostle in Triumph" on a tape of unsigned bands sent to Barrett. Barrett was so impressed that he decided to sign Opeth. Åkerfeldt later received a call from Barrett, who expressed his interest in releasing a full-length Opeth album.

== Recording and production ==
Orchid was recorded in March 1994 in Finspång, where the old Unisound Studio was located. Opeth relocated from Stockholm to Finspång, where Dan Swanö had arranged an apartment for them. The studio was situated in the cellar of a small house in the middle of a field. The album was produced and mixed by Swanö and the band, with Swanö also serving as engineer. For the recording, the band asked Johan De Farfalla to play session bass guitar. He ultimately joined as a full-time member.

Despite initial nervousness, the recording sessions proceeded smoothly. "We were so ready before we went into the studio, we'd been rehearsing six or seven times a week, and we'd even been rehearsing in pitch black darkness in order to play the songs perfectly without even looking," Åkerfeldt recalled in 2009, speaking to Kerrang! However, the band regretted not having enough time to properly record the acoustic piece "Requiem." Initially recorded at Unisound, the band was dissatisfied with the result. "Requiem" was later recorded in a Stockholm studio with Pontus Norgren as co-producer.

Due to a mix-up during Orchid's mastering process, the ending of "Requiem" was mistakenly placed at the beginning of "The Apostle in Triumph." The band expressed regret over the error, clarifying that it was not their fault. This mistake was later corrected in the 2023 Abbey Road remaster of the album.

== Musical style and lyrical themes ==
"In Mist She Was Standing"
This clip highlights the twin harmony guitar style featured on the band's early releases.

=== Music ===
The music on Orchid blends elements of progressive rock and acoustic pieces inspired by folk music with black metal screams, death metal growls, and clean vocals. It also features influences from jazz and melodic passages performed on piano and acoustic guitars. Opeth's sound stood apart from typical black or death metal bands of the era, and Orchid is considered the band's closest approach to the black metal genre. Critics described the album's sound as "unique." Jim Raggi commented, "If you're wanting the more deathy and song-oriented Opeth, skip down to My Arms, Your Hearse and go from there. If you're looking for a unique journey of music built alternately around dual guitar harmonies knocking into sequences when the two guitars and the bass are all playing different parts, stop-start transitions at times and smooth here-to-theres at others, here you go." Matt Smith observed that "with Orchid, the band introduced its blend of intricate, down-tempo acoustic guitar and piano lines and swinging, Celtic-sounding, distorted rhythms."

Most of the album's songs exceed nine minutes, though it also features two shorter instrumental tracks: "Silhouette" and "Requiem." "Silhouette" is a brief piano interlude recorded just hours before the band left the studio. Anders Nordin’s piano skills surprised the production team. Lindgren recalled, "I remember the look on Dan's face when we said, 'Our drummer can play the piano.' He didn't believe a word we were saying. Dan can play the piano. Most guys play like shit. When Anders started playing, Dan was actually impressed." Åkerfeldt later added, "I'm still quite impressed." The other instrumental, "Requiem," is an acoustic composition described by Lindgren as an "epic." Åkerfeldt borrowed a Spanish acoustic guitar, a Trameleuc, from a local guitar store to record the piece.

The bonus track, "Into the Frost of Winter," is an early recording from a 1992 rehearsal. This song includes segments that were later reworked into "Advent," the opening track on Opeth's second album, Morningrise.

=== Lyrics ===
After the departure of other members, Mikael Åkerfeldt and David Isberg began writing songs for Opeth. Åkerfeldt commented, "As you might understand I was more or less influenced by the occult back then, although in no serious manner. Music-wise I was really into the twisted, dark, and evil-sounding riffs. The lyrics written by both me and David were pure Satanic chantings!" According to Åkerfeldt, "the idea for Opeth was for it to be evil—satanic lyrics and evil riffs. I chose my notes so they sounded evil." The first two songs they wrote together were "Requiem of Lost Souls" and "Mystique of the Baphomet," which were later reworked into "Mark of the Damned" and eventually became "Forest of October."

When Isberg left the band, Åkerfeldt and Peter Lindgren felt they had discovered a unique approach to playing music. Åkerfeldt remarked, "There were at the time almost no other bands using that many harmonies as we did." Lindgren called "Forest of October" the best song on the album. Åkerfeldt, however, admitted that he doesn't remember the song's meaning, only that he wrote the lyrics to complement the music.

Åkerfeldt noted that "The Twilight Is My Robe," originally titled "Oath," was a "satanic song, like an oath to Satan." He revealed that one section of the song is "a complete rip-off" of Scorpions' "Fly to the Rainbow." "Under the Weeping Moon," described by Lindgren as the album's most evil track, features lyrics Åkerfeldt called "some kind of satanic worship of the moon," though he admitted, "It doesn't really deal with anything." Later, on The Roundhouse Tapes live album, Åkerfeldt described the song's lyrics as "absolute black metal nonsense." He praised the melody of "The Apostle in Triumph" and characterized its lyrics as "a combination of nature and satanic worship."

The album's longest track, "In Mist She Was Standing," was the last song completed. It was inspired by a nightmare and the film The Lady in Black.

== Cover and layout ==
=== Cover ===
When the recordings were completed, the band immediately began working on the cover layout. Åkerfeldt, who had been in contact with photographer Torbjörn Ekebacke for some time, discovered that Ekebacke also worked on graphic layouts. He was asked to create the layout for Orchid. The orchid featured on the cover was specially ordered from the Netherlands.

The first pressing of the album was released without the "Opeth" logo on the front cover. The photographs used on the back of the album were taken in Sörskogen. Åkerfeldt recalled, "We really were lucky as the sunset that evening was probably the most beautiful one I had ever seen. We shot several cool shots that day, but those silhouette ones were the best."

=== Layout ===
The band had already encountered one issue with the album regarding the mastering of "Requiem" (see Recording and Production). A second problem arose with the album: the lyric pages were printed in the opposite order from what Opeth had expected. The colors had been reversed, and the CD itself was blue instead of black. The band expressed regret for these mistakes, but fans stated they liked how the colors turned out. After finalizing the layout, the band sent the album to England.

== Reception ==
Professional ratings
Review scores
Source	Rating
AllMusic	3.5/5 stars

Critical reaction to the album was mostly positive. Critic Matt Smith of Maelstrom stated that it was one of the best Opeth albums and "set the tone for the albums to come." However, before the release of Orchid, Åkerfeldt commented:

Most people, at least in the Swedish scene, were recording at Unisound, and Opeth, before the album came out, was considered a joke band. No one expected anything from us. The rumor wasn't great about us. Some of the early shows we did were awful and David Isberg, our singer who formed that band, wasn't liked too much. We didn't have a good vibe going about the band. We didn't have any friends in the scene. I didn't know anyone. We were total outsiders.

— Mikael Åkerfeldt

John Serba of AllMusic said that Orchid was "quite an audacious release, a far-beyond-epic prog/death monstrosity exuding equal parts beauty and brutality – an album so brilliant, so navel-gazingly pretentious that, in retrospect, Opeth's future greatness was a foregone conclusion." John Chedsey of Satan Stole My Teddybear stated that the album is "one of the more stunning and devastatingly powerful debuts of any metal band in any genre." Jim Raggi of Lamentations of the Flame Princess wrote that "perhaps the most easily recognizable voice in all of extreme metal, Mikael Åkerfeldt really does make some noise in his debut. I can't think of very many vocalists in 1994 (when the album was recorded) who used both clean and growled vocals freely. I'm definitely not going to go so far as to say he was the first (Dan Swanö did beat him on that at least!) but all those years ago, Åkerfeldt did set the standard for what the extreme progressive music vocalist should sound like." He added, "The fact is this album is a groundbreaking milestone in heavy metal for the progressive elements that are thrown into the more metallic music and the extreme vocals," and the sound of the album is "completely unique." Chris Dick of Decibel stated in Precious Metal: Decibel Presents the Stories Behind 25 Extreme Metal Masterpieces:

Death metal, after its formative stages, wasn't averse to experimentation or the influence of other genres, but it never sounded as powerful, fearless, or skilled as on Orchid … Opeth's debut was, to quote frontman Mikael Åkerfeldt in 1993, a masterful hybrid of 'Wishbone Ash, Black Sabbath and Bathory.' … It was inviting, abrasive, and full of subtlety. Despite Symbolic, Slaughter of the Soul, Domination, The Gallery and Storm of the Light's Bane blowing minds in 1995, it was Opeth's Orchid that changed death metal forever.

— Chris Dick, Decibel

Not all critics were positive, however. The French magazine Metallian called the album "boring and uneventful" and gave it a 1/10. Johan De Farfalla stated, "From the death metal scene, they thought, 'Wow! This is cool!' From the educated musicians I knew, they said, 'This sucks. The sound is bad. You should re-record this.' But I think people really liked it, apart from the sound."

== Track listing ==
All tracks are written by Mikael Åkerfeldt except where noted.

No.	Title	Lyrics	Music	Length
1.	"In Mist She Was Standing"			14:09
2.	"Under the Weeping Moon"	Åkerfeldt, David Isberg		9:54
3.	"Silhouette" (Instrumental)		Anders Nordin	3:07
4.	"Forest of October"	Åkerfeldt, Isberg		13:05
5.	"The Twilight Is My Robe"			11:01
6.	"Requiem" (Instrumental)			1:11
7.	"The Apostle in Triumph"			13:01
Total length:				65:26

Century Black reissue bonus track
No.	Title	Length
8.	"Into the Frost of Winter"	6:20
Total length:		71:46

== Personnel ==
Credits for Orchid adapted from liner notes.

Opeth

- Mikael Åkerfeldt – lead vocals, guitars
- Peter Lindgren – guitars
- Anders Nordin – drums, percussion, piano on "Silhouette"
- Johan De Farfalla – bass (tracks 1–7), backing vocals

Additional personnel

- Stefan Guteklint – bass guitar on "Into the Frost of Winter"

Production

- Opeth – mixing
- Dan Swanö – engineering, mixing
- Peter in de Betou – mastering
- Pontus Norgren – co-production on "Requiem"
- Torbjörn Ekebacke – artwork, photography

== Release history ==
The release of Orchid was delayed, and with the band eager to perform live for the album, Opeth began playing a few shows after Lee Barrett of Candlelight Records led them to the United Kingdom. One of these performances took place at the London Astoria, featuring Impaled Nazarene, Ved Buens Ende, and Hecate Enthroned.

A year after the album's recording, Orchid was released on 15 May 1995 in Europe by Candlelight Records on CD, and on cassette by Mystic Production. It was released on 24 June 1997 in the United States by Century Black. In 2000, it was reissued in Europe by Candlelight and in the United States by Century Media, with one bonus track, "Into the Frost of Winter." That same year, it was released as a double-LP vinyl edition on Displeased Records, limited to 1000 copies. A special edition was released by Candlelight in 2003.

Region	Year	Label	Format	Catalog
United Kingdom	1995	Candlelight Records	CD	Candle010CD
Poland	1995	Mystic Production	Cassette	003
United States	1997	Century Black	CD	7845-2
United Kingdom	2000	Candlelight Records	CD	CANDLE053CD
Netherlands	2000	Displeased Records	Double LP	D-00081
United Kingdom	2003	Candlelight Records	CD	CANDLE053TIN
Japan	2008	Avalon	CD	MICP-10807
