= Still Life (Opeth album) =

Studio album by Opeth
- Released: 18 October 1999
- Recorded: 15 April – 29 May 1999
- Studios: Studio Fredman (Gothenburg, Sweden); Maestro Musik (Sweden)
- Genres: Progressive death metal; progressive rock
- Length: 62:29
- Label: Peaceville
- Producers: Opeth; Mikael Åkerfeldt; Fredrik Nordström

Opeth chronology
My Arms, Your Hearse (1998)	Still Life (1999)	Blackwater Park (2001)

Still Life is the fourth studio album by Swedish progressive metal band Opeth. It was produced and engineered by Opeth alongside Fredrik Nordström, and released on 18 October 1999 through Peaceville Records. It was the only Opeth album to be released through Peaceville, following the band's departure from Candlelight and Century Black after the release of My Arms, Your Hearse, and the first album to feature Martin Mendez.

== Background ==
=== Concept ===
Like its predecessor, My Arms, Your Hearse, Still Life is a concept album. Frontman Mikael Åkerfeldt explains: "Still Life was not Satanic but an anti-Christian theme. It sounds pretty naive when I explain it like this. It kind of takes place a long time ago when Christianity had a bigger importance than it has today. The main character is kind of banished from his hometown because he hasn't got the same faith as the rest of the inhabitants there. The album pretty much starts off when he is returning after several years to hook up with his old 'babe'. Obviously a lot of bad things start happening with, as I call it on the album, 'the council.' The big bosses of the town know that he's back. A lot of bad things start happening. They see him as a hypocrite in a way. It's almost like a devil's advocate or whatever it's called." The album then proceeds to portray Melinda's proclamation of love towards the protagonist. These events lead to her murder and the main character going on a rampage against the ones responsible. The last song of the record, "White Cluster" concludes the story with his execution and him meeting Melinda in the afterlife.

=== Preparation ===
Due to time constraints, the band was able to rehearse only twice before entering the studio. Delays with the album's artwork pushed the release back an additional month, and the album was released in Europe under the Peaceville/Snapper label on 18 October 1999. Due to problems with the band's new distribution network, the album was not released in American stores until 27 February 2001.

Still Life was the first Opeth album to bear any kind of caption on the front cover besides the band logo upon its initial release.

=== Style ===
Eduardo Rivadavia of Allmusic called Still Life a "formidable splicing of harsh, often jagged guitar riffs with graceful melodies".

== Release and reception ==
Professional ratings
Review scores
Source	Rating
Allmusic	4/5 stars
Chronicles of Chaos	9/10
Metal Crypt	5/5 stars
Metal Hammer	6/10
Metal Storm	10/10
PopMatters	(Very favorable)
Rock Hard	9.5/10
Sea of Tranquility	5/5 stars
Sputnikmusic	4.5/5 stars
Ultimate Guitar	9.6/10

The album was re-released by Peaceville Records in 2000 as a slipcase version and again as a digipak version in 2003. A third re-release came out on 31 March 2008, with reworked album artwork by original artist Travis Smith. This new edition has two discs, the first one being a remastered stereo mix of the album on Audio CD and the second one being an Audio DVD containing a 5.1 surround sound mix. The DVD also contains a live video for the album track "Face of Melinda" from The Roundhouse Tapes live performance in London. The remastered and remixed versions of the original recordings were done by Jens Bogren.

=== Accolades ===
In 2014, TeamRock put Still Life at #83 on their "Top 100 Greatest Prog Albums Of All Time" list with Jordan Griffin stating that it is "still regarded by many fans as a career high point, Still Life’s deft blend of beauty and brutality was lauded by metal and prog fans. Opeth’s first true classic.". Loudwire placed the album at #54 on their "Top 90 Hard Rock and Heavy Metal Albums of the 1990s" list, commenting that Opeth closed out the 90s with their strongest album yet, and at #2 on their "12 Best Prog Metal Albums of the '90s" list. In 2021, it was named one of the 20 best metal albums of 1999 by Metal Hammer magazine.

== Track listing ==
All tracks are written by Mikael Åkerfeldt

No.	Title	Length
1.	"The Moor"	11:26
2.	"Godhead's Lament"	9:47
3.	"Benighted"	5:00
4.	"Moonlapse Vertigo"	9:00
5.	"Face of Melinda"	7:58
6.	"Serenity Painted Death"	9:13
7.	"White Cluster"	10:05
Total length:		62:29

== Personnel ==
Credits for Still Life adapted from liner notes.

Opeth

- Mikael Åkerfeldt − vocals, guitars, mixing (DVD)
- Peter Lindgren − guitars
- Martin Mendez − bass
- Martin Lopez − drums

Production

- Fredrik Nordström − engineering, mixing
- Isak Edh − engineering
- Göran Finnberg − mastering
- Jens Bogren − 2008 reissue remastering, 5.1 remix, mixing (DVD)
- Travis Smith − album art, photography
- Harry Valimaki – photography
- Timo Ketola – logo

== Release history ==
Year	Region	Label	Format	Catalog
2000	Russia	Союз	CD	CDVILEM 78 / 6207 82
2000	United Kingdom	Peaceville	CD	CDVILEM 78
2002	United Kingdom	Peaceville	Vinyl LP	DLPVILE 78
2003	United Kingdom	Peaceville	CD	CDVILED 78
2005	Argentina	Icarus	CD	ICARUS 132
2008	United Kingdom	Peaceville	CD	CDVILED183X
2010	United Kingdom	Peaceville	Vinyl LP	VILELP78
