= Morningrise =

Studio album by Opeth
- Released: 24 June 1996
- Recorded: March–April 1996
- Studios: Unisound (Finspång, Sweden)
- Genre: Progressive death metal
- Length: 66:00
- Labels: Candlelight, Century Black
- Producers: Opeth, Dan Swanö

Opeth chronology
Orchid (1995)	Morningrise (1996)	My Arms, Your Hearse (1998)

Morningrise is the second studio album by Swedish progressive metal band Opeth. It was released on 24 June 1996 in Europe by Candlelight Records and on 24 June 1997 in the United States by Century Black. The recording sessions took place at Unisound studio, in Finspång, during March and April 1996. Morningrise was the last Opeth release with drummer Anders Nordin and bassist Johan De Farfalla, as well as the last Opeth album to be produced by Dan Swanö.

Morningrise showcases Opeth's signature style, exploring the dynamics between the combination of black metal and death metal vocals, and guitar parts with lighter progressive and acoustic elements.

== Recording and production ==
After touring, Opeth returned home to rehearse frequently, and booked Unisound Studio again to record the album.

Morningrise was recorded during March and April 1996 at Unisound in Finspång. They stayed at the residence of the family of Peter Lindgren's girlfriend. Opeth again produced and mixed along with Dan Swanö, similar to how the previous album, Orchid, was recorded. Swanö also engineered the album. This was the last album that Swanö worked on with Opeth. It was also the last album that was recorded with Johan De Farfalla and Anders Nordin.

As the release of the first album was delayed, they had already written most of Morningrise when Orchid was released. Although some parts of the material recorded date back to 1991, Mikael Åkerfeldt said, "the material we had been writing felt really fresh and new."

According to Åkerfeldt, recording Morningrise was "quite boring" because of "the endless drum takes, click track and shit like that". The band spent most of the time in the studio smoking. During the downtime, Åkerfeldt and Nordin wrote a guitar/piano duet, which would have been the album's instrumental track, but they did not have enough time to finish it.

Morningrise includes Opeth's longest song ever recorded, "Black Rose Immortal", with a length of 20:15, and is the band's only album where every song eclipses the ten minute mark in length.

== Artwork ==
Åkerfeldt said that the head of Candlelight went on holiday to Bath, England, and "he actually walked on the bridge or whatever it is". Later, he sent Åkerfeldt a postcard with a color version of the same picture that appears on the cover. The picture is of a Palladian bridge, located in Prior Park. The first pressing was released without the "Opeth" logo on the front cover.

== Musical style and lyrical themes ==
Along with Orchid, Morningrise shows a sound that is influenced by progressive rock, folk, black metal and death metal, but with more clean vocals than that of the previous record. Despite the singing, Murat Batmaz of Sea of Tranquility magazine said that the song "Black Rose Immortal" "ends with one of Akerfeldt's most violent and longest screams in his career which could only be rivaled by his guesting on Edge of Sanity's Crimson album", and that Opeth created a "dark atmosphere on this album, which is simply unique." The album has a "dark melancholic" sound, and features acoustic and jazz styles. However, according to William York of AllMusic, "Morningrise is, as far as the metal scale goes, possibly their least heavy album".

Mikael Åkerfeldt has stated that following the success of this album, he became tired of its style and the number of "copycat" bands using the counterpoint melodies found in this album and its predecessor. He also says that he finds certain sections of Morningrise "unlistenable" and was compelled to change Opeth's sound for My Arms, Your Hearse accordingly.

Lyrically, the song "The Night and the Silent Water" is about the grandfather of vocalist/guitarist Mikael Åkerfeldt, who had died shortly before the recording of the album. "To Bid You Farewell", the album's final song, was notable at the time for having a lighter sound and featuring only clean vocals. This album also features Opeth's longest recorded song, "Black Rose Immortal", which lasts over 20 minutes. The reissue bonus track "Eternal Soul Torture" is a demo that was recorded in 1992, and includes some sections that were reused in the studio track "Advent", as well as "In Mist She Was Standing" from the previous album Orchid.

== Reception ==
Professional ratings
Review scores
Source	Rating
AllMusic	4/5 stars
Chronicles of Chaos	8/10
Metal Crypt	4.5/5 stars
Metal Library	5/5 stars
Metal Utopia	7/10
Sea of Tranquility	5/5 stars
Tartarean Desire	9/10

The album was well-received critically. Vincent Eldefors of Tartarean Desire stated "ever since I first heard my first Opeth song "To Bid You Farewell" ... they have been among my favorite bands". "Dan Swanö helped record this epic piece", said John Chedsey of Satan Stole My Teddybear in his review, and also mentioned that "generally the songs flow well from one part to the next, though individual songs are not immediately noticeable. The twin guitars work well with each other, creating some great melodies in the guitars, and often lapsing into very tasteful acoustic moods. In my opinion, it's difficult to write on guitar intricate songs that fully involve the listener, but Opeth manages to keep your attention." Murat Batmaz of Sea of Tranquility wrote that "the melodies, both on this song ["Advent"] and the entire album, are immortal." He also wrote, "Though I prefer their current lineup, I don't believe Morningrise would have been so amazing without Johan De Farfalla and Anders Nordin adding their touches. They both incorporate subtle jazz harmonies in their playing enriching the psychedelic passages on the album." He was also impressed with the guitar riffs, saying "it is almost shocking how many godlike riffs Opeth are using in their songs. They literally employ tens of changing riff patterns and incomparable melodies on a single track, with which other bands could more than likely write two full albums" and claimed that the song "Black Rose Immortal" is a "magnum opus".

William York of AllMusic wrote, "the tracks here could best be described as miniature audio movies." Christian Renner of Metal Crypt praised the album as being "overall another excellent album worthy of extremely high praise and what would be a masterpiece for most bands turns out to be just another great album from the genius that is Opeth." Jim Raggi of Lamentations of the Flame Princess said that "this is still the most perfect album ever recorded." He also stated "the more personal nature of the lyrics on Morningrise are another thing that make it a much more intense listen than the stories that would follow. It's incredible how everything changed after this album. The lineup, the style, the lyrics ... Opeth has never released less than an excellent album. But they have only released one perfect album." Drew Schinzel of Chronicles of Chaos said that the songs are "melodic and well played, with great vocals and the occasional guitar solo". However, he also commented, "maybe I'm just not in touch with my inner-acoustic-child, but the acoustic sections are too numerous, and get old fast."

== Track listing ==
All lyrics are written by Mikael Åkerfeldt except where noted; all music is composed by Åkerfeldt and Peter Lindgren.

No.	Title	Length
1.	"Advent"	13:44
2.	"The Night and the Silent Water"	10:59
3.	"Nectar"	10:09
4.	"Black Rose Immortal"	20:14
5.	"To Bid You Farewell"	10:54
Total length:		66:00

Bonus track on reissue CD and LP only
No.	Title	Length
6.	"Eternal Soul Torture" (demo) (lyrics: David Isberg)	8:35
Total length:		74:35

== Personnel ==
Credits for Morningrise adapted from liner notes.

Opeth

- Mikael Åkerfeldt – vocals, guitars
- Peter Lindgren – guitars
- Johan De Farfalla – bass
- Anders Nordin – drums, percussion

Additional personnel

- Stefan Guteklint – bass guitar on "Eternal Soul Torture"

Production

- Dan Swanö – engineering, mixing
- Peter in de Betou – mastering
- Tuija Lindström – album cover
- Lennart Kaltea – photography
- Tom Martinsen – layout
- Timo Ketola – logo

== Release history ==
Morningrise was released on June 24, 1996, in Europe by Candlelight Records on CD, and on cassette by Mystic Production. In the same year, it was released in Japan by Avalon/Marquee. The album was released on June 24, 1997, in the United States by Century Black. It was reissued in 2000 on CD by Candlelight Records and on LP by Displeased Records. The LP was limited to 1000 copies. These reissues contains the bonus track "Eternal Soul Torture". A special edition was released by Candlelight in 2003. Another LP reissue of Morningrise was released in 2008 by British label Back on Black.

Region	Year	Label	Format	Catalog
United Kingdom	1996	Candlelight	CD	Candle015CD
Poland	1996	Mystic Production	Cassette	034
Japan	1996	Avalon/Marquee	CD	MICY-1022
United States	1997	Century Black	CD	7849-2
United Kingdom	2000	Candlelight	CD	Candle054CD
Netherlands	2000	Displeased	Double LP	D-00082
United Kingdom	2003	Candlelight	CD	CANDLE054TIN
United Kingdom	2008	Back on Black	LP	BOBV098LP
