= Deliverance (Opeth album) =

Studio album by Opeth
- Released: 12 November 2002
- Recorded: 22 July – 4 September 2002
- Studios: Studio Fredman (Gothenburg); Nacksving Studio (Gothenburg)
- Genre: Progressive death metal
- Length: 61:45
- Labels: Koch; Music for Nations
- Producers: Mikael Åkerfeldt and Steven Wilson

Opeth chronology
Blackwater Park (2001)	Deliverance (2002)	Damnation (2003)

Professional ratings
Review scores
Source	Rating
AllMusic	4/5 stars
Brave Words	8.5/10
Chronicles of Chaos	10/10
Rolling Stone	(favorable)
Pitchfork	8.7/10
Sputnikmusic	5/5 stars

Deliverance is the sixth studio album by Swedish progressive metal band Opeth, released on 12 November 2002. It was recorded between 22 July and 4 September 2002, concurrently with Damnation, whose release followed five months after that of this album. The two albums present a deliberate stylistic dichotomy, each emphasizing one of the band’s predominant musical approaches. Deliverance is widely regarded as the band’s heaviest release, characterized by a sound influenced by brutal death metal, while Damnation stands as their lightest work, marked by its progressive rock sound.

== Background ==
The band originally intended for Deliverance and Damnation to be released as a double album, but the record company eventually decided against this and released them separately, approximately five months apart from one another in order to promote them properly. The recording sessions also became a writing session of two albums' worth of material, causing the recordings to be long as there were no songs written prior to that point. Åkerfeldt wrote the songs in the night and recorded them with the band during the days.

The track "Master's Apprentices" was named after the Australian hard/progressive rock group The Masters Apprentices. "For Absent Friends" was named after a song on the album Nursery Cryme by progressive rock group Genesis.

At the end of "By the Pain I See in Others", the final note fades slowly and ends at 10:40. Silence follows until 12:00, followed by two backmasked verses from "Master's Apprentices" at 12:00 and 13:15.

== Production ==
The recording for Deliverance and Damnation was fraught with troubles. The band had originally started recording the album in Nacksving Studio, but the recording process was plagued, not just by a variety of technical issues ranging from equipment breaking down to drum mics changing positions or disappearing, but also internal band issues. Eventually, the band would return to Studio Fredman (upon which they would be joined by producer Steven Wilson) to finish off the record.

During the recording process, Mikael Åkerfeldt's grandmother was killed in a car accident. He would later dedicate both Deliverance and Damnation to her.

== Reception ==
Deliverance peaked on Top Heatseekers at No. 16 and the Top Independent Albums chart at No. 19, making it the first Opeth release ever to chart. Opeth also won a Grammis Award for Best Hard Rock Performance after releasing the album.

The album appeared on several lists of the best albums of 2002, including that of Kerrang!, Metal Hammer and Terrorizer. In 2012, Loudwire ranked Deliverance as the third best album of 2002. In March 2023, Rolling Stone ranked the title track number fifty-two on their list of "The 100 Greatest Heavy Metal Songs of All Time"

== Track listing ==
All tracks are written by Mikael Åkerfeldt

No.	Title	Length
1.	"Wreath"	11:11
2.	"Deliverance"	13:36
3.	"A Fair Judgement"	10:21
4.	"For Absent Friends" (instrumental)	2:17
5.	"Master's Apprentices"	10:30
6.	"By the Pain I See in Others"	13:50
Total length:		61:45

== Personnel ==
=== Opeth ===
- Mikael Åkerfeldt – vocals, electric and acoustic guitars
- Peter Lindgren – electric guitars
- Martín Méndez – bass guitar
- Martin Lopez – drums, percussion

=== Additional personnel ===
- Steven Wilson – backing vocals, additional guitars, Mellotron, piano, keyboards, production, engineering
- Opeth – production, engineering
- Fredrik Nordström – engineering
- Fredrik Reinedahl – engineering
- Andy Sneap – mixing
- Travis Smith – artwork

== Chart positions ==
=== Monthly ===
Chart (2003)	Peak position
Poland (ZPAV Top 100)	60
