= Martín Méndez =

Uruguayan bassist

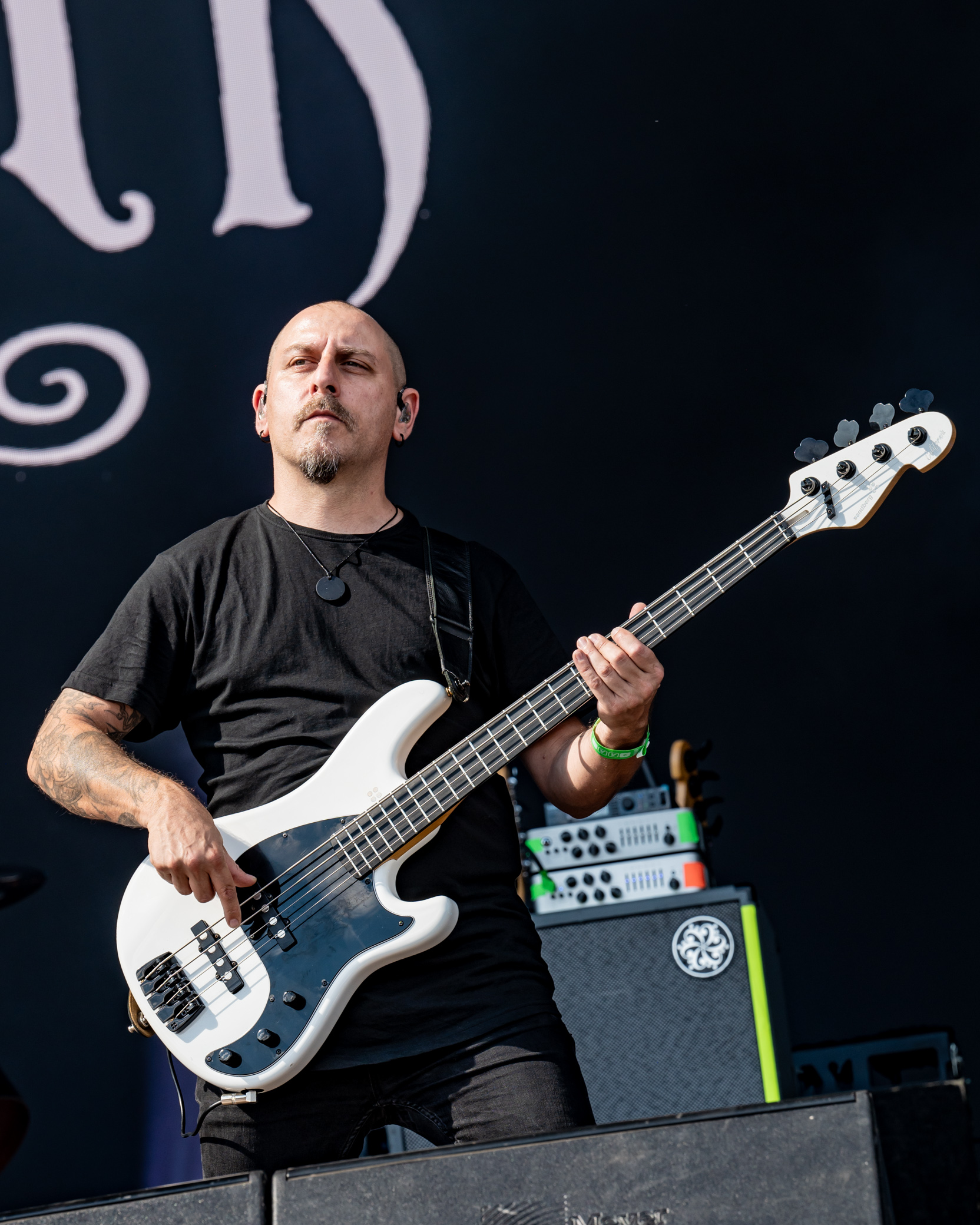
- Méndez performing with Opeth in 2024

Background information
- Born: Carlos Martin Mendez Esposito; 6 April 1978 (age 48); Montevideo, Uruguay
- Genres: Progressive metal, death metal, progressive rock
- Occupation: Bassist
- Years active: 1997–present
- Member of: Opeth
- Website: opeth.com

Martín Méndez (born 6 April 1978) is a Uruguayan Swedish musician. He migrated to Sweden when he was 17 years old. He is the bassist of the progressive metal band Opeth and the second-longest-serving member of the band, behind frontman Mikael Åkerfeldt. He founded the band White Stones in Barcelona in 2019.

Méndez has been a member of several other bands, including Fifth to Infinity, Proxima and Vinterkrig. He joined Opeth right before the recording of their third album My Arms, Your Hearse (1998) began. However, time conflicts kept him from playing on the album, so the bass lines were recorded by Mikael Åkerfeldt. Méndez then learned the bass parts and played bass for the few subsequent live dates done for the album. His first real recording with Opeth was their fourth studio album, Still Life (1999). He has been with the band ever since.

Méndez uses four-string fretted & fretless Fender Jazz Bass guitars as well as Sandberg bass guitars for live and studio work.

== Discography ==
=== With Opeth ===
- Still Life (1999)
- Blackwater Park (2001)
- Deliverance (2002)
- Damnation (2003)
- Ghost Reveries (2005)
- Watershed (2008)
- Heritage (2011)
- Pale Communion (2014)
- Sorceress (2016)
- In Cauda Venenum (2019)
- The Last Will and Testament (2024)

=== With White Stones ===
- Kuarahy (2020)
- Dancing into Oblivion (2021)
- Memoria Viva (2024)
