= Damnation (album) =

Studio album by Opeth
- Released: 22 April 2003
- Recorded: 22 July – 4 September 2002; 7 October 2002
- Studios: Studio Fredman (Gothenburg, Sweden); Nacksving Studio (Gothenburg, Sweden); No Man's Land (Hemel Hempstead, England; additional)
- Genre: Progressive rock
- Length: 43:03
- Labels: Koch (US), Music For Nations (UK)
- Producers: Opeth, Steven Wilson

Opeth chronology
Deliverance (2002)	Damnation (2003)	Ghost Reveries (2005)

Damnation is the seventh studio album by Swedish progressive metal band Opeth. It was released on 22 April 2003, five months after Deliverance, which was recorded within the same time frame. Damnation is the last Opeth album to date to be produced by Steven Wilson (although he did mix two future albums, Heritage and Pale Communion).

Damnation was a radical departure from Opeth's typical death metal sound, and the first Opeth album to use all clean vocals, clean guitars, and prominent Mellotron. Damnation was inspired by 1970s progressive rock, particularly the work of the British band Camel, which typically features no heavy riffs or extended fast tempos. Despite the change in style from Opeth's previous albums, Damnation received good reviews from critics and their fans.

== Production ==
Deliverance and Damnation were recorded during the same set of sessions, at Nacksving Studios and Studio Fredman. The majority of the recording of both albums was done, save for most of the Damnation vocals. For those parts, Åkerfeldt flew down to Wilson's studio, No Man's Land in the UK, just a day after his grandmother's funeral.

Mikael Åkerfeldt dedicated both Damnation and Deliverance to his grandmother, who had died in a car accident during the time the albums were being recorded.

== Critical reception ==
Professional ratings
Review scores
Source	Rating
AllMusic	4/5 stars
Brave Words	9/10
Chronicles of Chaos	8.5/10
Exclaim!	favorable
Pitchfork	9.1/10
Sputnikmusic	5/5 stars

In 2012, reviewing the Deliverance reissue, Ned Raggett of Pitchfork felt that Damnation succeeded without Opeth's previous death metal style, and showcased each band member's technical abilities on what is "the most surprising and entertaining album" in Opeth's discography.

In 2013, Loudwire listed Damnation as the second best album of 2003 (despite it being not "technically a metal album"), marveling "Damnation embraces the beautiful side Opeth had explored in prior albums and execute it marvelously. Mikael Akerfeldt’s singing voice is soothing to the ears, perfectly suited for the relaxing music that accompanies it."

In 2014, Prog put Damnation at number 91 on their "Top 100 Greatest Prog Albums of All Time" list commenting: "the first Opeth album to abandon metal entirely, Damnation trumped its heavier sibling Deliverance by bringing Mikael Åkerfeldt’s masterful songwriting to the fore".

== Track listing ==
All lyrics are written by Mikael Åkerfeldt, except where noted; all music is composed by Mikael Åkerfeldt.

No.	Title	Length
1.	"Windowpane"	7:44
2.	"In My Time of Need"	5:46
3.	"Death Whispered a Lullaby" (lyrics by Steven Wilson)	5:49
4.	"Closure"	5:15
5.	"Hope Leaves"	4:27
6.	"To Rid the Disease"	6:18
7.	"Ending Credits" (instrumental)	3:36
8.	"Weakness"	4:08
Total length:		43:03

=== Notes ===
- A music video was created for an edited version of "Windowpane".
- The vocal melody in the chorus of "To Rid the Disease" is borrowed from a track recorded by Mikael Åkerfeldt's side project Sörskogen, "Mordet i Grottan".

== Personnel ==
=== Opeth ===
- Opeth – engineering
  - Mikael Åkerfeldt – vocals and lead guitar
  - Peter Lindgren – rhythm guitar
  - Martín Méndez – bass guitar
  - Martin Lopez – drums

=== Additional personnel ===
- Steven Wilson − keyboards, piano, mellotron, backing vocals, mixing, mastering, production, engineering
- Travis Smith – artwork
- Fredrik Reinedahl – engineering

== Charts ==
=== Weekly charts ===
Chart (2003)	Peak position
Australian Albums (ARIA)	54
Dutch Albums (Album Top 100)	97
Finnish Albums (Suomen virallinen lista)	37
French Albums (SNEP)	112
UK Albums (OCC)	181
US Heatseekers Albums (Billboard)	10
US Independent Albums (Billboard)	14
US Billboard 200	192

=== Monthly charts ===
Chart (2003)	Peak position
Polish Albums (ZPAV)	76
