= David Isberg =

- Born: 1975 (age 50–51)
- Origin: Nacka, Sweden
- Genres: Hard rock, death metal, doom metal
- Occupation: Musician
- Instruments: Vocals, guitar, bass
- Years active: 1989–present

David Isberg (born 23 February 1975) is a Swedish musician who founded the progressive death metal band Opeth.

== Opeth ==
Isberg formed Opeth with friends from Täby in the spring of 1990. Long-time friend Mikael Åkerfeldt was in a band called Eruption but was considering leaving that group. Isberg invited him to play bass for Opeth and Åkerfeldt accepted the offer. When he came to rehearsal, however, none of the other band members knew he was coming and did not want to kick out the previous bassist. The ensuing argument resulted in the departure of all other members, who in turn formed Crowley in 1990; they released a demo tape, The Gate, in 1991.

Isberg remained with Opeth until 1992. Åkerfeldt then took over as lead vocalist.

== After Opeth ==
Isberg continued his musical career with electronic project Grooveza (later Grooveza/Fuzz), death metal bands Mynjun and Braathum, and experimental death metal band David Isberg & The Stockholm War Ensemble. Formed in Stockholm, he and Adam Skogvards of Mynjun formed death metal band Tutorial. Arising out of his death-doom project Somn, Isberg formed Bloodofjupiter in 2011.

== Poetry ==
Isberg has published two poetry books:

- Ornament of the Ominous Demoniac - The Coagulated blood of David (self-published, 2017)
- Numerisk Kaos - Stokastiska Svärtor & variabler in Swedish (published by Stevali, 2024)
