= My Arms, Your Hearse =

Studio album by Opeth
- Released: 18 August 1998
- Recorded: August–September 1997
- Studio: Studio Fredman (Gothenburg, Sweden)
- Genre: Progressive death metal
- Length: 52:34
- Label: Candlelight, Century Black
- Producer: Fredrik Nordström, Opeth & Anders Fridén

Opeth chronology
Morningrise (1996)	My Arms, Your Hearse (1998)	Still Life (1999)

My Arms, Your Hearse is the third studio album by Swedish progressive metal band Opeth, released in August 1998. It was the band's first album to be released simultaneously in Europe, through Candlelight Records, and in the United States, through Century Black.

== Background ==
My Arms, Your Hearse was the first Opeth album with drummer Martin Lopez, who answered a newspaper ad that Opeth put up searching for this spot to be taken after Anders Nordin left. Shortly thereafter the band also brought in Martín Méndez, a friend and previous bandmate of Lopez. However, Mendez did not have enough time to learn the bass parts for the album, so frontman Mikael Åkerfeldt played bass for the entire recording session. All of the songs on My Arms, Your Hearse are shorter than ten minutes, whereas on Opeth's previous album, Morningrise, every song exceeds this length. The album is dedicated to Lee Barrett (of Candlelight Records).

The title of the album is derived from the lyrics of the song "Drip, Drip" by the band Comus.

== Concept ==
Åkerfeldt wrote all the lyrics before the music was written, to create Opeth's first concept album. The album is about a ghost of a recently deceased man who is unwilling to accept his fate. He attempts to reconnect with his loved ones through the spiritual world, but only becomes more frustrated with his inability to do so, often scaring his loved ones rather than reassuring. His frustration culminates in an attempt to kill his beloved (who the ghost falsely suspects is cheating on him) to reunite with her, which proves to be an impossible task. His attempt only manages to cause his lover to lose interest in him. This failure causes the ghost to grow depressed as all of his loved ones forget about him. The ghost, however, still refuses to accept his fate through a desire to not be forgotten, causing him to be stuck in a never ending limbo, being perpetually stuck between life and death. Each song ends with the title of the next song. For example, "April Ethereal" ends with the word "when", which is the name of the next track. The written lyrics during the epilogue end with "prologue", signalling the ghost's never ending cycle of the afterlife.

== Reception ==
Professional ratings
Review scores
Source	Rating
AllMusic	4/5 stars
Chronicles of Chaos	10/10
Metal Crypt	4.75/5
Metal Storm	9.7/10
Sea of Tranquility	5/5 stars
Sputnikmusic	5/5 stars
Tartarean Desire	9.5/10
Terrorizer	4/5 stars

My Arms, Your Hearse was widely praised by critics. Steve Huey of AllMusic said that it "flows logically from one composition to the next, and the mostly long songs have enough variation in texture and mood to hold the listener's interest fairly consistently". Jeb of Metal Faith magazine said, "each song sort of flows into the next giving the whole album a unified feel". Jeff of Mid West Metal magazine commented, "having never been exposed to Opeth, I had them pegged as a typical black metal bands that sings about love and relationships and crap like that. I really didn't expect to get blown out of the water when 'April Ethereal' kicked in, from this point I am converted! And while the album has some mellow parts and some folk-ish characteristics, it's still a very intense album from a band who seems to have not forgotten how the fuck they got their current plateau in life." Christian Renner of Metal Crypt wrote, "the musicianship is brilliant as always and the songwriting is just what you would expect from this incredibly talented group. This is another great album that most bands out there would give their right arm to have written and that statement just speaks volumes of the songwriting talent of the Åkerfeldt/Lindgren team." Pedro Azevedo of Chronicles of Chaos said of the album, "though some parts of the drum sound are somewhat awkward at times (new drummer and bass player, by the way), the instrumental performance is as great as one would expect, and Akerfeldt's vocals are again amazing. Top quality sections just flow throughout the album, making it truly -excellent-. My Arms, Your Hearse is a indeed a brilliant proof that Swedish metal isn't entirely stagnant." Tartarean Desire's critic Cseke Róbert wrote, "this record is more powerful and more beautiful than most of today's music from this genre. The entire record is a mixture of hell-bound adrenalin and soul... My Arms, Your Hearse is such a powerful album that I consider it one of the best of the genre." Demonic Tutor (Olivier Espiau) of Metal Storm stated the album is a "trip to heaven" and also:

"If the album Blackwater Park remains as Opeth's masterpiece so far, My Arms, Your Hearse also deserves the maximal rating. I personally think that this record is equal to Blackwater Park ... Well, every metalhead on earth MUST have this album. If you're tired of your standards or if you just want to discover new horizons in the metal world, or simply if you don't want to miss the best band for its creativity, listen to Opeth... Listening to My Arms, Your Hearse, I can say that perfection has now a name: Opeth."

— Olivier Espiau, Metal Storm.

Tim Henderson of Brave Words & Bloody Knuckles said "you are in for a treat, easily described as the black metal version of The Dark Side of the Moon in all its pride and glory. In fact, if Gilmour joined Emperor, or if Cradle took sides with Yes, can My Arms, Your Hearse be truly described". "My Arms, Your Hearse is a milestone in '90s extreme metal", wrote Chris Bruni in his review for Unrestrained! magazine. He also wrote that the album is "easily their most stunning achievement" and "the songs are stronger, heavier, more cohesive, with a stronger sound courtesy of Studio Fredman, and the textures and song movements are some of the best executed structures to be heard in metal".

Loudwire considers it to be among the most essential metal releases of the 1990s for vinyl collectors.

== Track listing ==
All tracks are written by Mikael Åkerfeldt, except where noted

No.	Title	Writer(s)	Length
1.	"Prologue"		0:59
2.	"April Ethereal"		8:41
3.	"When"		9:14
4.	"Madrigal"		1:26
5.	"The Amen Corner"		8:43
6.	"Demon of the Fall"	Åkerfeldt, Peter Lindgren	6:13
7.	"Credence"		5:26
8.	"Karma"		7:50
9.	"Epilogue"		4:02
Total length:			52:34

2000 reissue bonus tracks
No.	Title	Writer(s)	Length
10.	"Circle of the Tyrant" (Celtic Frost cover)	Tom Gabriel Fischer	5:12
11.	"Remember Tomorrow" (Iron Maiden cover)	Steve Harris and Paul Di'Anno	4:59
Total length:			62:45

== Personnel ==
Credits for My Arms, Your Hearse adapted from liner notes.

Opeth

- Mikael Åkerfeldt – vocals, guitars, bass, piano
- Peter Lindgren – guitars, photography
- Martin Lopez – drums

Production

- Fredrik Nordström – engineering, mixing, Hammond organ on "Epilogue"
- Anders Fridén – engineering
- Göran Finnberg – mastering
- Tom Martinsen – graphic design

== Release history ==
This is the second Opeth album with a major delayed release (the first being Orchid) and the recording for My Arms, Your Hearse was done a year before its release, just like Orchid. My Arms, Your Hearse was released on 18 August 1998 simultaneously in Europe and the United States on CD by Candlelight Records and Century Black, respectively. It was released in Poland by Mystic Production on cassette. The album was reissued in 2000 on CD by Candlelight Records and on LP by Displeased Records. The LP was limited to 1,000 copies. These reissues contain two bonus tracks, "Circle of the Tyrants" and "Remember Tomorrow". They are covers of songs that were only previously available on two separate tribute albums, In Memory of Celtic Frost and A Call to Irons: A Tribute to Iron Maiden, respectively. A special edition was released by Candlelight in 2003.

Year	Region	Label	Format	Catalog
1998	United Kingdom	Candlelight	CD	CANDLE25
1998	United States	Century Black	CD	7894-2
1998	Poland	Mystic Production	Cassette	159
2000	United Kingdom	Candlelight	CD	Candle055
2000	Netherlands	Displeased	Double LP	D-00083
2000	United States	Candlelight	CD	CANUS068CD
2003	United Kingdom	Candlelight	CD	CANDLE055TIN
2003	Russia	IROND	CD	IROND CD 03-632
2005	United Kingdom	Candlelight	LP	CVCS 005 PD
2006	Japan	Candlelight	CD	XQAN-1003
2008	United Kingdom	Back On Black	LP	BOBV099LP
2008	Japan	Avalon	CD	MICP-10809
