= Blackwater Park =

Studio album by Opeth
- Released: 12 March 2001
- Recorded: August – October 2000
- Studios: Studio Fredman (Gothenburg, Sweden)
- Genres: Progressive death metal; progressive rock
- Length: 66:59
- Label: Music for Nations / Koch
- Producers: Opeth, Steven Wilson

Opeth chronology
Still Life (1999)	Blackwater Park (2001)	Deliverance (2002)

Blackwater Park is the fifth studio album by Swedish progressive metal band Opeth. It was released on 12 March 2001, in Europe and a day later in North America through Music for Nations and Koch Records. The album marks the first collaboration between Porcupine Tree frontman Steven Wilson and the band, as Wilson had been brought in to produce the album. This contributed to a shift in Opeth's musical style. The songs "The Drapery Falls" and "Still Day Beneath the Sun" were released as singles.

Although Blackwater Park did not chart in North America or the United Kingdom, it was a commercial breakthrough for the band. Often considered their magnum opus, the album was highly acclaimed among critics, with Eduardo Rivadavia of AllMusic stating that the record is "surely the band's coming-of-age album, and therefore, an ideal introduction to its remarkable body of work". In 2020, Loudwire listed Blackwater Park as the number one progressive metal album of all time. Rolling Stone ranked the album as 55th on their list of 'The 100 Greatest Metal Albums of All Time.'

== Production ==
Following a few live dates in Europe, Opeth's guitarist and vocalist Mikael Åkerfeldt went to an old friend's house in Stockholm, Sweden, to record some demos and develop ideas for the new album. The album is named after the German progressive rock band of the same name and was the first album for which the group had a title before they started recording.

This album featured heavy input from Porcupine Tree frontman Steven Wilson, whose relationship with Opeth had begun in the past when an interviewer, who was a friend of Åkerfeldt's and knew the latter was a fan of Wilson's work, gave Wilson a copy of Opeth's then-latest release Still Life, which Wilson ended up liking so much that he contacted Åkerfeldt about it. A few months after the making of the demos, Åkerfeldt was having dinner with Wilson in which the two discussed the idea of Wilson producing the next Opeth album. After Åkerfeldt sent Wilson the demos he had recorded, Wilson agreed to produce the album.

Opeth entered Studio Fredman to begin work on Blackwater Park on August 10, 2000. The band had no previous lyrics written and had only rehearsed three times before entering the studio. The band's engineer Fredrik Nordström had arranged for the group to stay in a small room in the studio that had four beds. Opeth stayed there for around two weeks and then later rented out Dark Tranquillity member Mikael Stanne's flat. After recording the basic drums, rhythms, bass and acoustic guitars, Wilson arrived to produce the clean vocals and add some guitar leads. Åkerfeldt wrote that Wilson had an "immense impact on the recording" and after working with him the group entered "a new phase".

Åkerfeldt described the recording of the album as "rather smooth". Soilwork was recording in the studio at the same time as Opeth. Åkerfeldt wrote that Opeth felt like "a bunch of amateurs in comparison. They were working all the time. When they came into the kitchen for a break, we're still there, on the same break we took 3 hours ago. We don't want this to become a 'job', or something you do because you have to. We wanna have a good time, and thus we only work when it feels right."

== Release ==
Blackwater Park was originally released on March 12, 2001, in Europe and a day later in North America. This was the first Opeth album to be released in North America at the same time as it was in the rest of the world. It has been released on compact disc and vinyl record formats. A special edition of Blackwater Park was issued in 2002 with a bonus second disc that included "Still Day Beneath the Sun" and "Patterns in the Ivy II". Those two bonus tracks were released together as a vinyl-only 7-inch EP by Robotic Empire Records in February 2003. The limited edition EP sold out in less than 24 hours and continues to be one of Opeth's most sought-after releases to date. Two singles were also released to promote Blackwater Park. A shortened radio edit version of "The Drapery Falls" was released as a promo single. The bonus track "Still Day Beneath the Sun" was later released as a vinyl only single.

Blackwater Park did not chart in the United States or United Kingdom. As of May 2008, Blackwater Park has sold over 93,000 copies in the United States.

On March 29, 2010, Opeth re-released a Legacy Edition of Blackwater Park which included a live version of "The Leper Affinity" and then a second DVD which is the entire album in 5.0 Surround Sound and a making of documentary. This version was released in North America in April 2012 by The End Records.

== Critical reception ==
Professional ratings
Review scores
Source	Rating
AllMusic	5/5 stars
Classic Rock	4/5 stars
Metal Crypt	4.75/5; 5+/5
Pitchfork	9.0/10
Record Collector	4/5 stars
Rock Hard	9.5/10
Sea of Tranquility	5/5 stars
Ultimate Guitar	9.8/10

Blackwater Park received critical acclaim upon release. Eduardo Rivadavia of AllMusic wrote that the album was "a work of breathtaking creative breadth" and noted the album's critical praise stating that "not since the release of Tiamat's groundbreaking masterpiece Wildhoney in 1994 had the extreme metal scene witnessed such an overwhelming show of fan enthusiasm and uniform critical praise as that bestowed upon Blackwater Park.” He also said that the album is "surely the band's coming-of-age album, and therefore, an ideal introduction to its remarkable body of work.” Pitchfork praised the album, writing that "Blackwater Park has the reputation it does in large part because none of the songs follow the same songwriting formula, instead looking toward variations within general themes that all build to a dramatic conclusion in the title track." Opeth was compared to critically acclaimed groups from previous eras. The Village Voice wrote in their review of the album, that "Opeth paint on an epic canvas, sounding at times like... metal's answer to '70s King Crimson". CMJ also wrote a very positive review calling the album "Godlike ... a metal fusion of Pink Floyd and the Beatles". The Canadian music magazine Exclaim! wrote that the album "might be the best metal record this year, and it is worth every bit of energy the band has put into the creating of it.”

Decibel wrote that "Blackwater Park’s brilliance is the production. Co-produced by Opeth and Wilson and engineered by Fredrik Nordström, it’s one of the first death metal albums to feel, well, different. Crystal clear, yet resolutely heavy, Blackwater Park is also full of nuance." Similarly, Pitchfork noted that Wilson's "production help and encouragement teased out the band's explorations of acoustic-led arrangements as much as electric ones while further showcasing Åkerfeldt's sweet, clear singing as much as the roars on songs like "The Leper Affinity" and the title track." British magazine Record Collector called Blackwater Park Opeth's finest hour and added that much of the credit "can be attributed to the advanced vision of Steven Wilson."

Loudwire ranked Blackwater Park as the 15th best metal album of all time, claiming the album reflected the group's "70s art-rock influences, supported by consistently intricate, wildly imaginative nine-to-ten-minute epics, each one more awe-inspiring than the last."

Sputnikmusic placed Blackwater Park at No. 39 on its list of the Top 100 Albums of the Decade.

== Accolades ==
In 2020, Loudwire listed Blackwater Park as the number one progressive metal album of all time. It was Metal Storm's number 1 album of 2001 and number 4 on the Top 200 albums of all time. LA Weekly named it the 5th best metal album in history. Rolling Stone ranked Blackwater Park as 55th on their list of 'The 100 Greatest Metal Albums of All Time.

In 2009, MetalSucks compiled a list of the "21 Best Metal Albums of the 21st Century So Far" based on the opinions of various musicians, managers, publicists, label representatives and writers, where Blackwater Park ranked at No. 3 on the list. Decibel magazine similarly named Blackwater Park the 3rd best metal album of the decade. The album was listed at No. 5 on Terrorizer's best albums of the 2000s.

In June 2015, Rolling Stone ranked Blackwater Park at 28th place for their list of "Greatest Prog Rock Albums of All Time". TeamRock placed the album at #36 on their "Top 100 Prog Albums of All Time" list.

In 2012, Loudwire listed the title track as the second best metal song of the 21st century. Q magazine included Bleak in its 2004 list of "1010 Songs You Must Own!"

== Track listing ==
All lyrics are written by Mikael Åkerfeldt; all music is composed by Åkerfeldt except where noted.

No.	Title	Music	Length
1.	"The Leper Affinity"		10:23
2.	"Bleak"		9:15
3.	"Harvest"		5:58
4.	"The Drapery Falls"		10:52
5.	"Dirge for November"	Åkerfeldt, Peter Lindgren	7:51
6.	"The Funeral Portrait"		8:42
7.	"Patterns in the Ivy" (instrumental)		1:50
8.	"Blackwater Park"	Åkerfeldt, Lindgren	12:08
Total length:			66:59

Reissue bonus disc
No.	Title	Length
1.	"Still Day Beneath the Sun"	4:34
2.	"Patterns in the Ivy II"	4:12
3.	"Harvest" (multimedia track)	6:01
Total length:		14:47

== Personnel ==
=== Opeth ===
- Mikael Åkerfeldt – vocals, electric and acoustic guitars
- Peter Lindgren – electric guitars
- Martín Méndez – bass guitar
- Martin Lopez – drums, percussion

=== Additional musicians ===
- Steven Wilson – keyboards, mellotron, piano, clean and backing vocals (on track 2-4 & 6), additional guitar
- Markus Lindberg – egg shakers

=== Production ===
- Steven Wilson – production, engineering, mixing
- Opeth – production, engineering, mixing, artwork
- Fredrik Nordström – engineering, mixing
- Göran Finnberg – mastering

=== Additional personnel ===
- Harry Välimäki – photography
- Travis Smith – artwork

== Charts ==
=== Weekly charts ===
Chart (2001)	Peak position
Polish Albums (ZPAV)	10

Chart (2021)	Peak position
Belgian Albums (Ultratop Wallonia)	112
German Albums (Offizielle Top 100)	58

=== Monthly charts ===
Chart (2001)	Peak position
Polish Albums (ZPAV)	31

== Certifications ==
Certifications for Blackwater Park
Region	Certification	Certified units/sales
United Kingdom (BPI)	Silver	60,000^{‡}
^{‡} Sales+streaming figures based on certification alone.
