= Peter Lindgren (musician) =

Swedish musician and songwriter (born 1973)

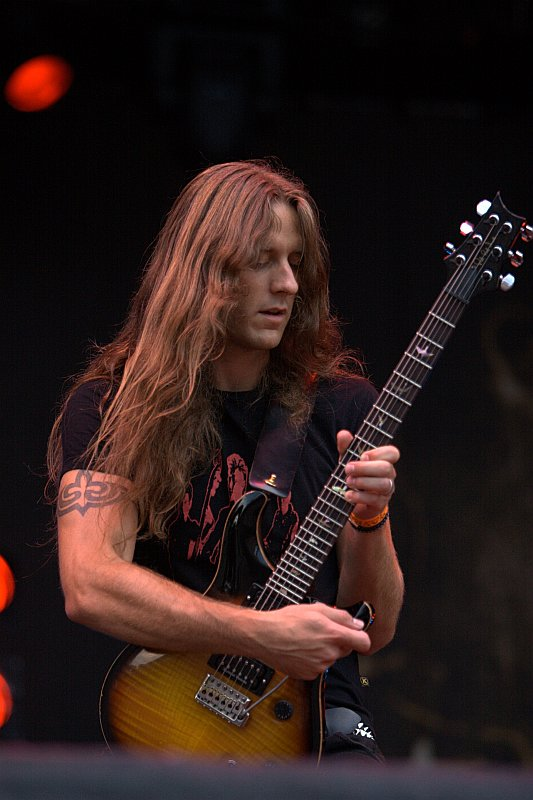
- Peter Lindgren performing with Opeth in 2006

Background information
- Born: 6 March 1973 (age 53)
- Genres: Death metal, progressive metal, progressive rock
- Occupations: Musician, songwriter
- Instruments: Guitar, bass
- Years active: 1991–2007
- Label: Roadrunner

Peter Lindgren (born 6 March 1973) is a Swedish musician and songwriter. He is best known as the former guitarist of Swedish progressive metal band Opeth.

== Musical career ==
Lindgren joined Opeth in 1991 as bassist for a show, but ended up switching to guitars. As explained in "The Making of Deliverance and Damnation" on Opeth's live DVD Lamentations, lead-playing duties were based on ease of Mikael Åkerfeldt's vocal delivery and which of the two might want a given solo more. If Åkerfeldt was having trouble with a solo, he would hand it over to Lindgren, and vice versa. In March 2004, Peter and Mikael Åkerfeldt were both ranked #42 out of the 100 Greatest Heavy Metal Guitarists of all time by Guitar World.

During his career in Opeth, Lindgren co-wrote the music for several songs along with Mikael Åkerfeldt, such as "Black Rose Immortal" from Morningrise, "Demon of the Fall" from My Arms, Your Hearse, as well as "Dirge for November" and "Blackwater Park" from Blackwater Park.

In May 2007, Peter Lindgren announced that he had left Opeth due to the rigors of life on the road as a touring musician and because he had lost his enthusiasm for playing in Opeth. Both Lindgren and Åkerfeldt said that the split was amicable. Lindgren was since replaced by Fredrik Åkesson.

== Personal life ==
Lindgren holds degrees in engineering physics at KTH Royal Institute of Technology and literature at Stockholm University. Since his departure from Opeth, Lindgren has worked as an IT consultant and Partner in Stockholm and has so far stayed out of the public eye.

== Influences ==
Lindgren became a musician after growing up listening to the band Iron Maiden and was also heavily influenced by the Metallica album Master of Puppets. He was introduced to '70s progressive rock by listening to the band Camel, one of the influences on Opeth's progressive style.

== Equipment ==
Guitars

- PRS Custom 24
- Gibson Les Paul Custom 1974
- Jackson Randy Rhoads
- 1991 Gibson SG

Amplification

- Laney VH100R (His amplifier settings/eq were almost exactly like Åkerfeldt's during live performances)

Effects

- BOSS GT-5 effect processor
