= Progressive metal =

Music genre melding heavy metal and progressive rock

- Other names: Prog metal
- Stylistic origins: Heavy metal; progressive rock
- Cultural origins: Mid-1980s, North America, United Kingdom

Subgenres
- Djent

Fusion genres
- Progressive metalcore; progressive doom; technical thrash metal; technical death metal; progressive death metal

Regional scenes
- United Kingdom; United States; Scandinavia; Canada; Germany

Progressive metal (often shortened to prog metal) is a broad fusion music genre melding heavy metal and progressive rock, combining the loud aggression and amplified distorted guitar-driven sound of the former with the more experimental, cerebral or quasi-classical compositions of the latter.

The music typically showcases the extreme technical proficiency of the performers and usually uses unorthodox harmonies as well as complex rhythms with frequent meter changes and intense syncopation. The polyrhythmic aspects are especially emphasized in the djent subgenre.

Although the genre emerged towards the late-1980s, it was not until the 1990s that progressive metal achieved widespread success. Dream Theater, Watchtower, Queensrÿche, Tool, Symphony X, Shadow Gallery, King's X, Fates Warning, and Mastodon are a few examples of progressive metal bands who achieved commercial success.

== Characteristics ==
Metal Hammer describes progressive metal as "a genre with way fewer boundaries than the rest of the heavy metal family tree, meaning that each year will always bring fresh sounds from unexpected places." The publication stated that in the 1980s, "metal took on the DNA of progressive rock," that gave way to "a mutant strain of music that married volume and aggression with brain-melting complexity, far-reaching ambition and barking mad concepts." According to AllMusic, the genre's earliest acts such as Fates Warning and Queensrÿche developed their sounds by "merg[ing] their love of Yes and Rush with their admiration for Iron Maiden and Judas Priest."

Most bands labeled under the genre have considerably different musical influences when compared to each other. Bands such as Dream Theater, Planet X and Puya have a jazz influence, with extended solo sections that often feature "trading solos". Some progressive metal bands incorporate ballads and acoustic music into their arrangements. Loudwire stated that the genre is "unaffected by trends."

Lyrics in progressive metal draw influence from fantasy and literature, similar to the progressive rock of the 1970s. Themes may also include outer space and anti-capitalism.

== History ==
Progressive metal, as a distinct musical style, was primarily advanced by members of the American heavy metal scene of the early-to-mid-1980s, particularly Queensrÿche, Savatage, Fates Warning, Watchtower, and a few years later on, Dream Theater, and then even later than that in the mid-1990s, Symphony X. It has since developed in a non-linear fashion, with countless groups demonstrating innovations in personal ways.

The origins of the genre date back to the very beginning of heavy metal/hard rock and progressive rock when some bands began to merge the two different approaches. 1960s pioneers King Crimson maintained their musical innovation while incorporating a harder approach, using dissonance and experimental tones, yet still maintaining a relationship to the power chords of hard rock, with the main example being "21st Century Schizoid Man". Canadian trio Rush is widely recognized as bridging the gap between hard rock, English progressive rock, and pure heavy metal. Initially influenced by Led Zeppelin, they evolved to combine established progressive rock technique with blues-based power chords. Records such as 2112 (1976) showcased technical expertise and complex compositional skill while still utilizing a more direct and heavier approach than the well-established English progressive rock sound.

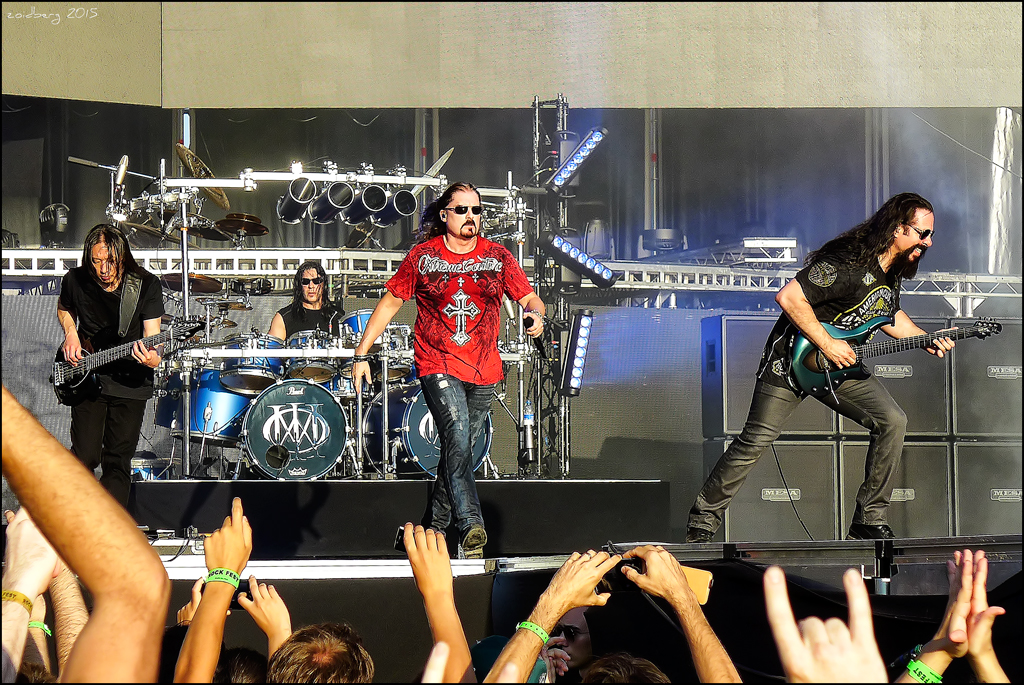
Dream Theater live in 2015

1984 brought full-length debut albums from American bands Queensrÿche from Washington state, and Fates Warning from Connecticut. Both expanded their music to include more progressive elements (The Warning, 1984; The Spectre Within, 1985) – some through sound experimentation and compositional refinement, others through extremely complex structures and atypical riffs—up to the two seminal works in 1986: Rage for Order and Awaken the Guardian. In the following years the two bands, while following different paths—more basic and simple the first, more articulate and complex the latter—explore and expand the technical refinement and sonic finesse of their music, continuing to lay the foundations of the genre with important works such as Operation: Mindcrime (1988) by Queensrÿche, and Perfect Symmetry (1989) by Fates Warning.

Progressive metal also found a home in the growing U.S. thrash metal movement, and many bands of the genre released albums that drew elements and influences of progressive music, including the "Big Four" of thrash metal—Metallica (Ride the Lightning, 1984; Master of Puppets, 1986; ...And Justice for All, 1988), Slayer (Hell Awaits, 1985), Anthrax (Persistence of Time, 1990), and Megadeth (Rust in Peace, 1990). Bands that took a technical and progressive approach similar to the "Big Four" were Toxik (World Circus, 1987; Think This, 1989), Overkill (The Years of Decay, 1989), Dark Angel (Leave Scars, 1989; Time Does Not Heal, 1991), and Bay Area thrash metal bands Forbidden (Twisted into Form, 1990), Heathen (Victims of Deception, 1991), and, on some of their late 1980s and 1990s output, Testament. One of the most notable thrash metal bands outside of the U.S. is Canada's Voivod, with their complex and experimental style, full of psychedelic dissonances (Dimension Hatröss, 1988; Nothingface, 1989). "Math-metal" pioneers Watchtower, from Texas, took the concept of time-changes to a new level, combining thrash metal, syncopation and prog in their albums Energetic Disassembly (1985) and Control and Resistance (1989), giving rise to an extremely technical approach based on the rhythmic deconstruction typical in jazz fusion. This same direction in prog metal would be later integrated into death metal by bands such as Atheist (Unquestionable Presence, 1991), which would become known as technical death metal or progressive death metal. Bands which also explored fusion-inspired prog metal include most notably Death and Cynic.

The major US bands that contribute to further delineating and developing the genre are Psychotic Waltz and Dream Theater. The former, with an approach halfway in between Watchtower and Fates Warning, produced A Social Grace (1990), melding their signature sound with the psychedelic Into the Everflow (1992), while the latter explored the legacy of the bands that preceded them while advancing their personal style with When Dream and Day Unite (1989). Both albums focused on keyboards and band members' instrumental skills. As for Dream Theater, their efforts resulted in two fundamental albums, which helped institutionalize classic progressive metal—Images and Words (1992) and Awake (1994). King's X, who emerged from a Christian rock background, incorporated their sound with influences of hard rock, metal, progressive rock, funk, soul and bands from the Beatles to U2 on their early albums—particularly their first three albums, Out of the Silent Planet (1988), Gretchen Goes to Nebraska (1989) and Faith Hope Love (1990)—before leaning more towards an alternative and grunge-inspired hard rock sound on their later output, including the highly-successful Dogman (1994). Other hard rock bands from this era that experimented with influences of progressive music into their sound include Europe, the Cult, Winger, Living Colour, Mr. Big, and Extreme.

Among European pioneers of the genre are Germany's Sieges Even, who, starting out of technical thrash stylistically significant to Watchtower, explored the more technical and angular side of progressive metal with The Art of Navigating by the Stars (2005). Swiss band Coroner, formed by roadies of Celtic Frost, have also been credited as pioneers of the style of technical thrash metal. They released a string of influential albums through the late 1980s and early 1990s, including Punishment for Decadence (1988), No More Color (1989) and Mental Vortex (1991), the latter two "etched Coroner's name onto the walls of the progressive metal hall of fame."

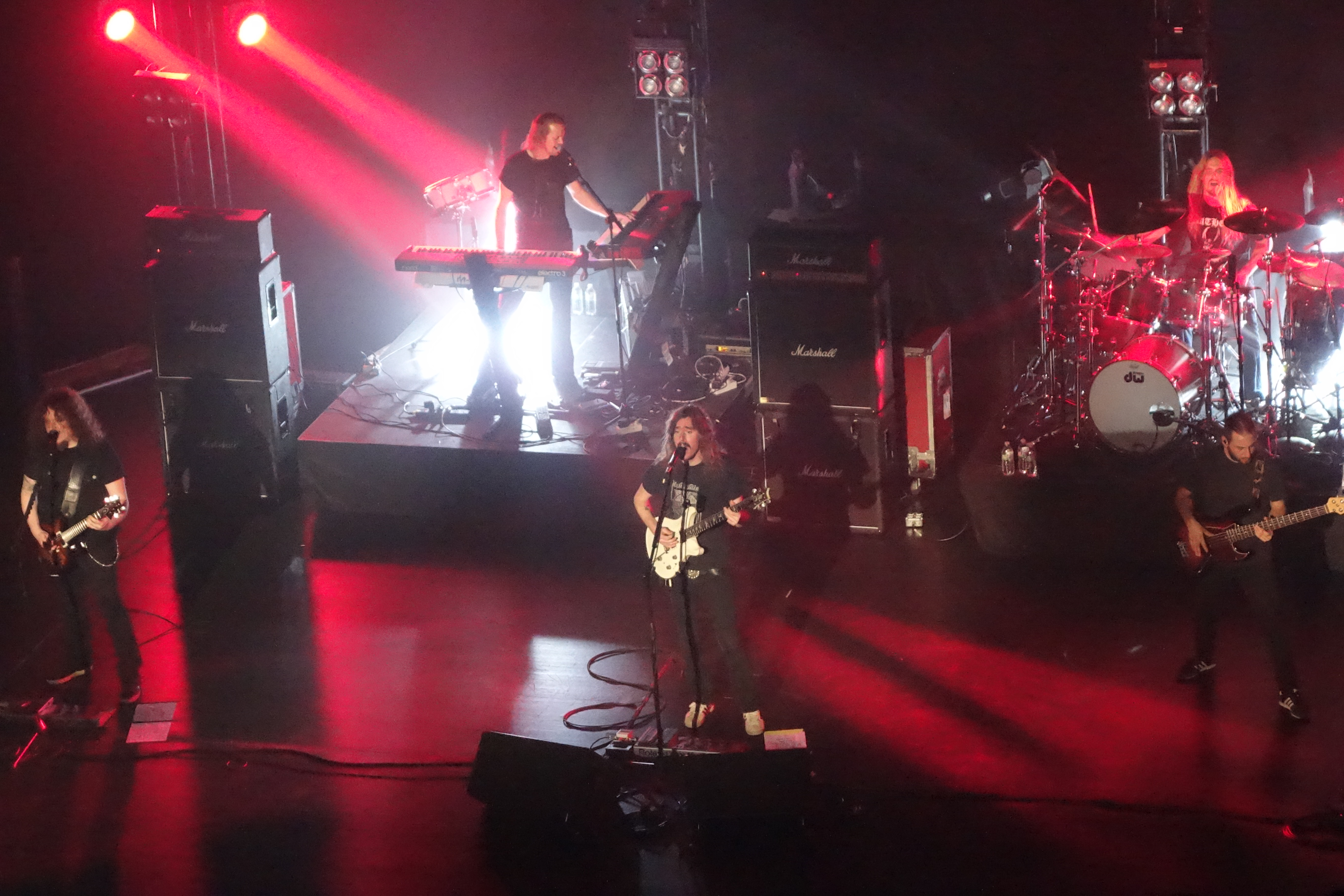
Opeth live in 2015

Among the bands of the late 1990s who brought innovation to the genre are the Dutch Ayreon (a project by Arjen Anthony Lucassen) and Swedes Pain of Salvation. Ayreon focused on theatrical and melodramatic rock operas Into the Electric Castle (1998) and The Human Equation (2004), performed by many different members of prominent metal bands. Pain of Salvation was always working towards a more or less unusual style, demonstrated by the eclecticism and anti-conformism found on One Hour by the Concrete Lake (1998), and BE (2004). Forerunners of a more experimental and alternative approach include Thought Industry, as seen in their album Mods Carve the Pig: Assassins, Toads and God's Flesh (1993).

Puerto Rican band Puya rose to prominence in the late 1990s with their innovative fusion of jazz, salsa, and progressive metal, evident on their 1999 album Fundamental.

Some of the first bands to pioneer the combination of progressive rock and extreme metal influences were Dan Swanö's Edge of Sanity, and Opeth, both bands hailing from Sweden. In particular, Edge of Sanity's Crimson (1996), a 40-minute concept album consisting of a single track, brought the band critical acclaim and was heralded as one of the first extreme-metal forays into a progressive rock-esque concept album, featuring death-metal vocals and heavily distorted guitars, with guest vocals and lead guitar from Opeth's Mikael Åkerfeldt. Dan Swanö produced Opeth's first release, Orchid (1995), which was unique for its combination of death metal vocals and instrumentation, melodic guitar harmonies, and acoustic passages, but it wasn't until their hallmark record Blackwater Park (2001) that they received critical acclaim. Steven Wilson, progressive rock icon and frontman of Porcupine Tree, was given a copy of Opeth's prior record Still Life (1999) from a friend, and, after listening, noted that the experimental music he had been after had drifted into extreme metal. Being mutual fans of each other's work, Steven ended up co-producing Blackwater Park along with Opeth's frontman Mikael Åkerfeldt, and would go on to co-produce Deliverance (2002) and Damnation (2003), together a would-be double album. Their next release, Ghost Reveries, became an "instant classic," followed by Watershed, both of which have had significant influence on the progressive metal genre, along with other "extreme metal" bands like Meshuggah. This style of progressive metal is often referred to as "extreme progressive metal," or "extreme prog," for short. Later bands who would play in this style are Ne Obliviscaris, Disillusion. Porcupine Tree would later be influenced by this style, and in particular from Opeth, while Opeth would subsequently switch to a more traditional progressive metal/rock band, devoid of extreme metal elements until 2024's The Last Will And Testament.

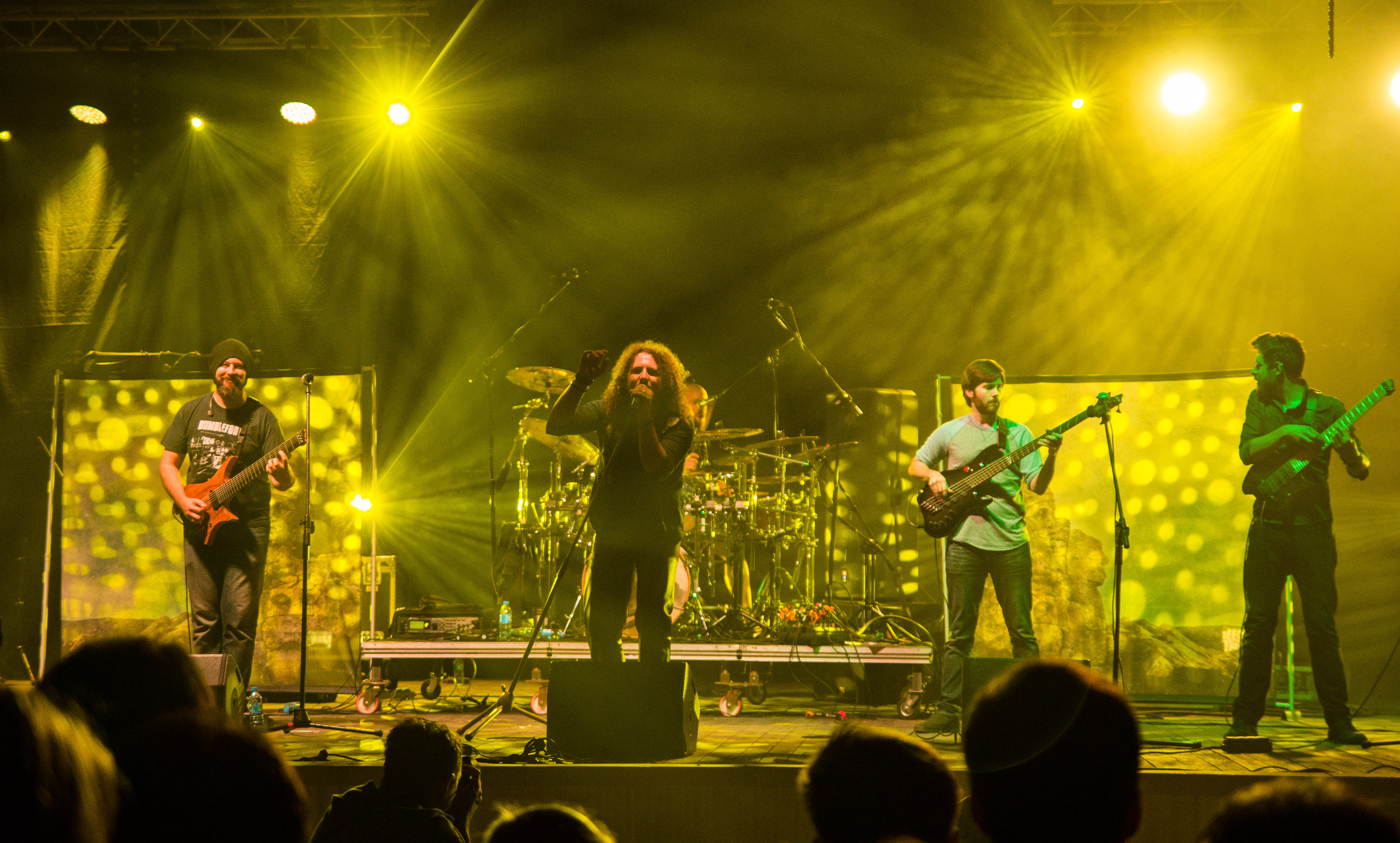
Haken live in 2014

Between the Buried and Me, who started as a more straightforward metalcore band, also began to incorporate both progressive metal and death metal into their music on their 2003 album The Silent Circus, a landmark album in the progressive metalcore genre. They would later add avant-garde elements as well on releases such as The Great Misdirect (2009).

In the 2010s, due to the rapid growth of djent led by bands such as Periphery and After the Burial, progressive metal saw an increased interest with a large number of newcomers to the genre. Some of the newer progressive metal bands that have gained popularity since the 2010s are Haken, Plini, Vola, Caligula's Horse, and Karnivool among others.

== Derivative forms ==
=== Djent ===
In the late 2000s, bands such as Periphery, Tesseract, Animals as Leaders and Vildhjarta popularized the "djent" style of progressive metal in a sound originally developed by Meshuggah. It is characterized by high-attack, palm-muted, syncopated riffs (often incorporating polymeters), as well as use of extended-range guitars. Extended-range guitars also feature in other forms of progressive metal; artists including Dream Theater, Devin Townsend, Dir En Grey, and Ne Obliviscaris have used seven-string guitars without being part of the djent movement, Dream Theater having been one of the earliest progressive metal bands to incorporate seven-stringed guitars into their music.

=== Other fusions ===
Progressive doom is a fusion genre that combines elements of progressive metal and doom metal. Bands include King Goat, Below the Sun, Sierra, and Oceans of Slumber.

== See also ==
- Heavy metal subgenres
- List of progressive metal artists
- Timeline of progressive rock
