= ProgPower Europe =

Dutch progressive metal festival

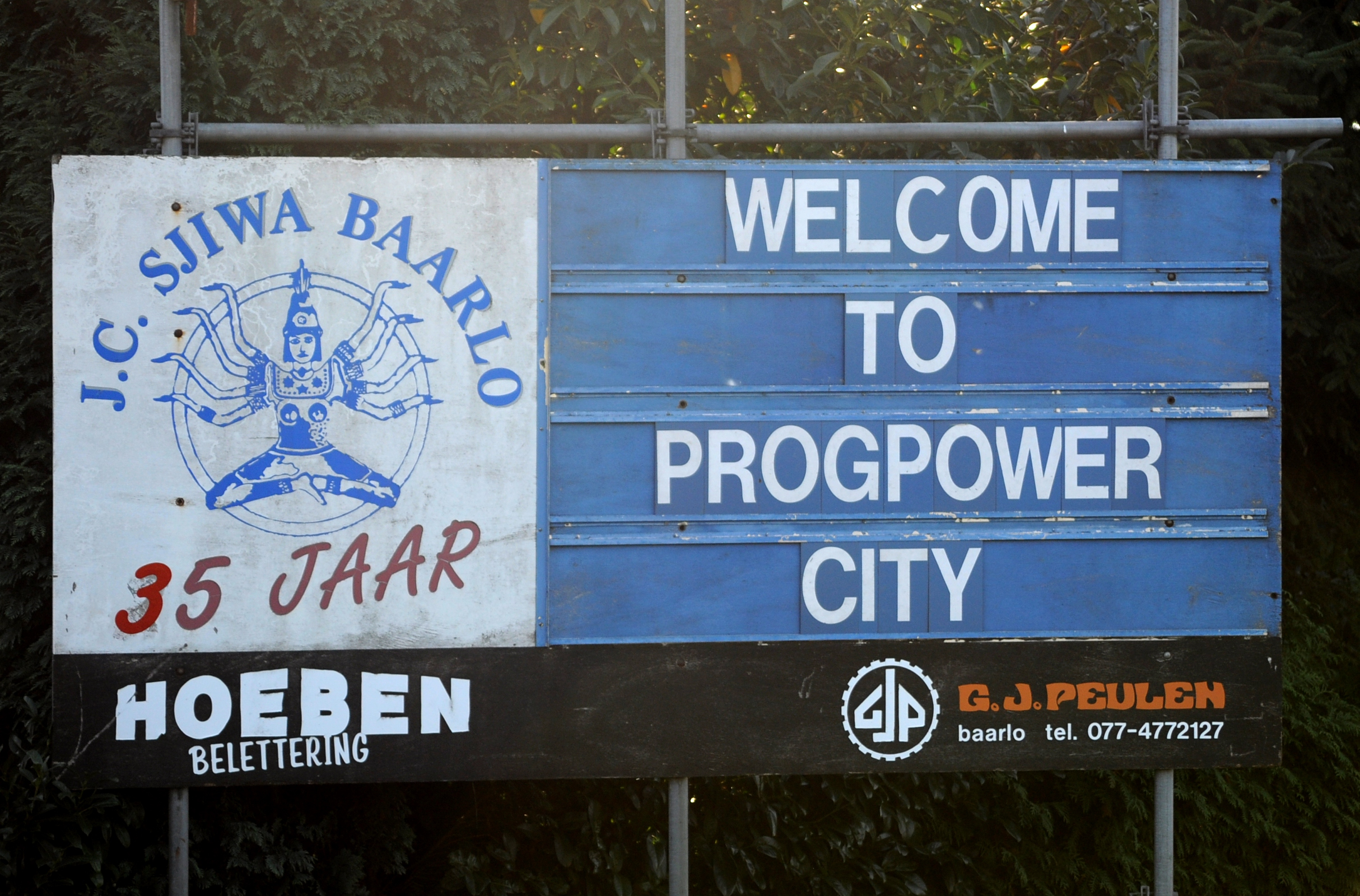
- Genre: Progressive metal
- Dates: October
- Locations: Baarlo, Netherlands; Tilburg, Netherlands
- Years active: 1999–present
- Founders: Rene Janssen
- Website: progpowereurope.com

ProgPower Europe (formerly ProgPower) is a progressive metal festival held annually in the Netherlands since 1999. Notable headliners have included Sons of Apollo, Evergrey, and Caligula's Horse.

== History ==
The beginnings of ProgPower Europe started in November 1998 by René Janssen (mostly known from his activities for the Dutch Progressive Rock Pages) decided the time had come for a special event in the progressive metal scene. A contest was held to name the festival; Peter Renfro (founder of the ProgDay Festival in the US) submitted ProgPower, which was deemed the best. So René started looking around for other prog metal fans who would be willing to organise a festival with him. The first ProgPower Europe took place in November 1999 at 013 in Tilburg, Netherlands. All the follow on events have taken place at Sjiwa in Baarlo, Netherlands.

== ProgPower Europe Specials ==
Some special performances were given at ProgPower Europe:

- In 2008 Wolverine played both on Saturday 4 October and on Sunday 5 October. On Saturday they played the same set they played 10 years before when they were headlining the first ProgPower festival. On Sunday they played their regular 2008 set.
- In 2009 Evergrey surprised everybody with an acoustic set during the diner break.
- In 2012 Persefone played Thursday night before ProgPower Europe in memory of Mikko Laine, who died in a truck accident the year before. Mikko Laine was the guitarplayer in the Finnish band Sole Remedy.
- In 2013 Damian Wilson was doing an acoustic set and standup show (!). He also jumped on a table outside the venue during a break playing acoustic guitar and sing-a-long songs with the ProgPower family.
- In 2014 Pain of Salvation played the whole of Remedy Lane, in addition to a regular set.

== Lineups ==
Year	Location	Thursday / Friday	Saturday	Sunday
1999	013 in Tilburg, Netherlands			14 November: Threshold (UK); Poverty's No Crime (Germany); Pain of Salvation (Sweden); Mayadome (Sweden); Evergrey (Sweden); Forever Times (Netherlands); Superior (Germany); Symmetry (Netherlands); Lemur Voice (Netherlands); Wolverine (Sweden)
2000	Sjiwa in Baarlo, Netherlands		10 November: Evergrey (Sweden); Sonic Debris (Norway)	11 November: Opeth (Sweden); Sonic Debris (Norway); Brayndance (Germany); After Forever (Netherlands); Spiral Architect (Norway); Manticora (Denmark); Arabesque (Netherlands)
2001	Sjiwa in Baarlo, Netherlands		5 October: Pain of Salvation (Sweden); Superior (Germany); Zero Hour (United States); Silent Edge (Netherlands)	6 October: Vanden Plas (Germany); Into Eternity (Canada); Wolverine (Sweden); Poverty's No Crime (Germany); Anomaly (Netherlands); Andromeda (Sweden)
2002	Sjiwa in Baarlo, Netherlands		5 October: Threshold (UK); Heaven's Cry (Canada); Dead Soul Tribe (Austria)); Stonehenge (Hungary); Divided Multitude (Norway); Antares (Netherlands)	6 October: After Forever (Netherlands); Ashes to Ashes (Norway); The Song Retains the Name (Germany); ACT (Sweden); Sun Caged (Netherlands); Arabesque (Netherlands)
2003	Sjiwa in Baarlo, Netherlands		4 October: Vanden Plas (Germany); Nightingale (Sweden); Green Carnation (Norway); Novembre (Italy); Chrome Shift (Denmark); Symmetry (Netherlands)	5 October: Evergrey (Sweden); At Vance (Germany); Elegy (Netherlands); Pagan's Mind (Norway); Andromeda (Sweden); Xystus (Netherlands)
2004	Sjiwa in Baarlo, Netherlands		2 October: Devin Townsend (Canada); Alchemist (Australia); Adagio (France); Platitude (Sweden); All Too Human (United States); The Dust Connection (Netherlands)	3 October: The Gathering (Netherlands); Katatonia (Sweden); Riverside (Poland); Tomorrow's Eve (Germany); Novact (Netherlands); Into Eternity (Canada)
2005	Sjiwa in Baarlo, Netherlands	30 September: Mind Key (Italy); Time Line (Netherlands)	1 October: Epica (Netherlands); Green Carnation (Norway); Novembers Doom (United States); Orphaned Land (Israel); Throes of Dawn (Finland); Disillusion (Germany)	2 October: Pain of Salvation (Sweden); Pagan's Mind (Norway); Wolverine (Sweden); Cloudscape (Sweden); Dynamic Lights (Italy); The Aurora Project (Netherlands)
2006	Sjiwa in Baarlo, Netherlands	29 September: Dreamscape (Germany); Zero Gravity (Belgium)	30 September: Mercenary (Denmark); Textures (Netherlands); Scar Symmetry (Sweden); Ephel Duath (Italy); Chaoswave (Italy); Another Messiah (Netherlands)	1 October: Riverside (Poland); Communic (Norway); Dark Suns (Germany); Voyager (Australia); Nova Art (Russia); Sphere of Souls (Netherlands)
2007	Sjiwa in Baarlo, Netherlands	5 October: Thessera (Brazil); Picture of the Moon (Netherlands)	6 October: Alchemist (Australia); Orphaned Land (Israel); Nahemah (Spain); DGM (Italy); Oceans of Sadness (Belgium); Non-Divine (Netherlands)	7 October: Jon Oliva's Pain (United States); Sieges Even (Germany); Dreamscape (Germany); Circus Maximus (Norway); Meyvn (United States); Day Six (Netherlands)
2008	Sjiwa in Baarlo, Netherlands	3 October: Pagan's Mind (Norway); Atrox (Norway); Division by Zero (Poland)	4 October: Cynic (United States); Zero Hour (United States); Alarum (Australia); Wolverine (Sweden); Sun Caged (Netherlands); Cilice (Netherlands)	5 October: Threshold (UK); Wolverine (Sweden); Suspyre (United States); The Aurora Project (Netherlands); Pathosray (Italy); 21 Eyes of Ruby (Netherlands)
2009	Sjiwa in Baarlo, Netherlands	2 October: Andromeda (Sweden); Cloudscape (Sweden); Cirrha Niva (Netherlands)	3 October: Mercenary (Denmark); Nahemah (Spain); Seventh Wonder (Sweden); Chaos Divine (Australia); Vanity (Poland); Akphaezya (France)	4 October: Evergrey (Sweden); Hacride (France); Neverland (Turkey / Greece); Enochian Theory (UK); Prospect (Slovenia); Knight Area (Netherlands)
2010	Sjiwa in Baarlo, Netherlands	1 October: Serenity (Austria); Leprous (Norway); Klone (France)	2 October: Shadow Gallery (United States); Myrath (Tunisia); Darkwater (Sweden); Xerath (UK); Proghma-C (Poland); Haken (UK)	3 October: Jon Oliva's Pain (United States); Oceans of Sadness (Belgium); Day Six (Netherlands); The Dust Connection (Netherlands); Sacrum (Argentina); Love de Vice (Poland)
2011	Sjiwa in Baarlo, Netherlands	30 September: Seventh Wonder (Sweden); Subsignal (Germany); Barstool Philosophers (Netherlands)	1 October: Symphony X (US); Long Distance Calling (Germany); DGM (Italy); In Mourning (Sweden); White Walls (Romania); Schizoid Lloyd (Netherlands)	2 October: Redemption (US); Mekong Delta (Germany); Kingcrow (Italy); Sole Remedy (Finland); Memento Waltz (Italy); Sky Architect (Netherlands)
2012	Sjiwa in Baarlo, Netherlands	5 October: Heaven's Cry (Canada); Anubis Gate (Denmark); Ørkenkjøtt (Norway); 4 October: Persefone (Andorra)	6 October: Vanden Plas (Germany); Nightingale (Sweden); The Levitation Hex (Australia); Alarum (Australia); Shattered Skies (Ireland); A Liquid Landscape (Netherlands)	7 October: Circus Maximus (Norway); Akphaezya (France); Borealis (Canada); Uneven Structure (France); Thurisaz (Belgium); Atlantis (Netherlands)
2013	Sjiwa in Baarlo, Netherlands	4 October: Shadow Gallery (US); Damian Wilson (UK); 3 October: Nehl Aëlin (France)	5 October: Fates Warning (US); Haken (UK); Hacride (France); Oddland (Finland); Verbal Delirium (Greece); Dimaeon (Netherlands)	6 October: The Ocean (Germany); Wolverine (Sweden); The Omega Experiment (US); Toundra (Spain); Ramage Inc. (UK); Malicious Dream (Netherlands)
2014	Sjiwa in Baarlo, Netherlands	2 October: Heavy Hoempa; 3 October: Jolly (US); Votum (PL)	4 October: Voyager (AU); Aeon Zen (UK); Pain of Salvation (Replacement for Pagan's Mind (NO); Aeon of Horus (AU); Prospekt (UK); Disperse (PL)	5 October: Pain of Salvation (SE) "Remedy Lane" Set; Agent Fresco (IS); Chimp Spanner (UK); Vulture Industries (NO); Tenebris (PL); Cartographer (NL)
2015	Sjiwa in Baarlo, Netherlands	2 October: Myrath (TN); Vola (DK)	3 October: Pagan's Mind (AU); Soen (S); Schizoid Lloyd (NL); Exxasens (E); Karma Rassa (RU); Armed Cloud (NL)	4 October: Leprous (NO); Enchant (US); Obsidian Kingdom (E); Animations (PL); Serdce (BY); Until Rain (GR)
2016	Sjiwa in Baarlo, Netherlands	30 September: Jolly (US); Subterranean Masquerade (Worldwide)	1 October: Textures (NL); Chaos Divine (AU); In Mourning (S); Distorted Harmony (ISR); 6:33 (FR); Atmospheres (B)	2 October: Threshold (UK); Wolverine (S); Nordic Giants (UK); Klone (FR); Sadist (IT); Smallman (BG)
2017	Sjiwa in Baarlo, Netherlands	5 October: Damian Wilson (UK); 6 October: Voyager (Australia); Sleepmakeswaves (Australia)	7 October: Soen (Sweden); Pyramaze (Denmark); Atrox (Norway); Kauan (Russia); Blindead (Poland); Cataya (Germany)	8 October: Tesseract (UK); Toehider (Australia); Hemina (Australia); Brutai (UK); Organized Chaos (Serbia/Chile); Semistereo (Netherlands)
2018	Sjiwa in Baarlo, Netherlands	4 October preparty at Kasteel De Berckt: Spires (UK); 5 October: Sons of Apollo (United States); Need (Greece)	6 October: Evergrey (Sweden); Major Parkinson (Norway); Ramage Inc. (UK); Adimiron (Italy); The Thirteenth Sun (Romania); Golden Caves (Netherlands)	7 October: Caligula's Horse (Australia); Subsignal (Germany); Circles (Australia); Voices (UK); Dvne (Scotland, UK); Temples on Mars (UK)
2019	Sjiwa in Baarlo, Netherlands	4 October: Diablo Swing Orchestra (Sweden); Voyager (Australia)	5 October: Psychotic Waltz (United States); Ghost Ship Octavius (United States); Kingcrow (Italy); Voices From The Fuselage (UK); Anima Tempo (Mexico); Scarlet Stories (Netherlands)	6 October: Lost In Thought (UK); Prehistoric Animals (Sweden); Rendezvous Point (Norway); Kong (Netherlands); Teramaze (Australia); Persefone (Andorra)
2022	Sjiwa in Baarlo, Netherlands	30 September: Von Hertzen Brothers (Finland); Mother Of Millions (Greece)	1 October: Green Carnation (Norway); Iotunn (Denmark); Godsticks (UK); Feather Mountain (Denmark); Smalltape (Germany); Inhalo (Netherlands)	2 October: Seventh Wonder (Sweden); Avandra (Puerto Rico United States); Meer (Norway); Vulkan (Sweden); Nero di Marte (Italy); Neverus (Netherlands)
2023	Sjiwa in Baarlo, Netherlands	6 October: Earthside (United States); Wheel (Finland)	7 October: Wilderun (United States); An Abstract Illusion (Sweden); Dordeduh (Romania); Hei’an (Slovenia); Chaosbay (Germany); Hackberry (Netherlands)	8 October: Teramaze (Australia); Darkwater (Sweden); Maraton (Norway); Ihlo (UK); Obsidian Tide (Israel); Omnerod (Belgium)
2024	Sjiwa in Baarlo, Netherlands	4 October: Maestrick (Brazil); Pure Reason Revolution (UK)	5 October: ENMA (Netherlands); No Terror In The Bang (France); TERRA (Italy); Apotheus (Portugal); Madder Mortem (Norway); Sadist (Italy)	6 October: URSA (Belgium); Ions (Czech Republic); Ou (China); The Anchoret (Canada); Crimson Glory (United States); Caligula's Horse (Australia)
2025	Sjiwa in Baarlo, Netherlands	3 October: Extol (Norway); Nospun (United States)	4 October: Vanden Plas (Germany); Major Parkinson (Norway); Elegy (Netherlands); Mayfire (Norway); Trylion (Poland); The Cryptex (Germany)	5 October: Threshold (UK); Kingcrow (Italy); Kyros (UK); Voidchaser (Canada); Tiberius (UK); TRAELS (Belgium)
2026	Sjiwa in Baarlo, Netherlands	2 October: The Reticent (United States); Rendezvous Point (Norway)	3 October: Hyla (Netherlands); Playgrounded (Greece/Netherlands); Terravia (Norway); Hippotraktor (Belgium); PreHistoric Animals (Sweden); The Dear Hunter (United States)	4 October: Royal Sorrow (Finland); Sister May (Belgium); Quantum (Sweden); Fractal Sun (Costa Rica); Esoterica (UK); Einar Solberg (Norway)

== Postponed and cancelled lineups ==
=== 2020–2021 ===
ProgPower Europe was originally scheduled to take place 2-4 October, 2020 at Sjiwa in Baarlo, Netherlands. However, it was announced on 29 May 2020 that it was postponed until October 2021 due to the COVID-19 pandemic. It was announced on 31 March 2021 that due to the COVID-19 pandemic the festival was postponed again until September/October 2022.
