= 2011 in European music =

The following is a list of notable events and releases that occurred in 2011 in mainland European music.

== Events ==
=== January ===
- 17 – The 2011 Grammis Awards take place in Sweden. Robyn walks away as the big winner of the night receiving awards in four categories: Best Female Artist; Best Composer; Best Album for Body Talk; and Best Song for Dancing on My Own.
- 30 – The Netherlands national final for the Eurovision Song Contest was held (Nationaal Songfestival). The song Je vecht nooit alleen (You will never fight alone) is chosen for Dutch band 3JS.

=== February ===
- 13 – Melissa Horn begins a tour of Denmark
- 18 – Slovak national broadcaster Slovenská televízia announces that girl-group TWiiNS will represent the country at the 56th annual Eurovision Song Contest with the song I'm Still Alive.
- 18 – Germany decide upon the song Taken by a Stranger in the final of Unser Song für Deutschland to represent the country at the Eurovision Song Contest. Lena Meyer-Landrut will attempt to retain her title following Germany's win of the contest in 2010.
- 19 – Spain decides to send Lucía Pérez to Düsseldorf with the song Que me quiten lo bailao in the final of Destino Eurovisión.
- 19 – Italy decides to send Raphael Gualazzi to Düsseldorf with the song Follia d'amore in the final of the Sanremo Festival 2011.
- 19 – Kylie Minogue begins the European leg of her Aphrodite World Tour in Denmark, with dates following in Finland, Estonia, Latvia, Lithuania, Germany, Spain, Switzerland, Belgium, Ireland and the United Kingdom.
- 26 – The so-called 'Super Saturday' takes place where six nations choose their participants for the Eurovision Song Contest. Musiqq, Mika Newton, Nina, A Friend In London, Zdob şi Zdub and Getter Jaani will represent Latvia, Ukraine, Serbia, Denmark, Moldova and Estonia respectively.
- 28 – Roxette begins its Charm School World Tour in Kazan, Rusia, in front of 8.000 people. 55 shows are set for Europe.

=== May ===
- 14 – The finale of the 56th Eurovision Song Contest takes place in Düsseldorf, Germany. It is won by pop duo Ell & Nikki, representing Azerbaijan with the song "Running Scared".

=== Undated ===
- A Winged Victory for the Sullen form.

== Albums set to be released ==
=== January ===
- 28 – Violent Sky by Lisa Miskovsky

=== February ===
- 8 – Good News by Lena Meyer-Landrut
- 11 – Charm School by Roxette
- 11 – Thank God for Sending Demons by Me and My Army
- 14 – Love CPR by September
- 18 – Das wär dein Lied gewesen by Ina Müller
- 18 – Kick death's Ass by Andreas Mattsson
- 28 – Wounded Rhymes by Lykke Li

=== March ===
- 16 – Unseen by The Haunted
- 29 – Surtur Rising by Amon Amarth

=== April ===
- 15 – The Unseen Empire by Scar Symmetry
- 25 – Bloodbath over Bloodstock by Bloodbath
- 27 – Satan i gatan by Veronica Maggio

=== May ===
- 30 – Khaos Legions by Arch Enemy

=== June ===
- 6 – A Dying Man's Hymn by Sky Architect
- 15 – Sounds of a Playground Fading by In Flames
- 17 – Ljubav živi by Ceca
- 20 – Original Me by Cascada

=== October ===
- 10 – Biophilia by Björk
- 25 – Audio, Video, Disco by Justice
- 25 – Mylo Xyloto by Coldplay

=== Unspecified date ===
- Untitled by Agnes Carlsson
- The Seven Temptations by Doda

== Festivals ==
=== Exit Festival ===
- Arcade Fire
- Pulp
- Jamiroquai
- Portishead
- Grinderman
- M.I.A.
- Editors
- House of Pain
- Santigold
- Bad Religion
- Kreator
- Underworld
- Deadmau5
- Groove Armada
- Magnetic Man

=== Metaltown Festival ===
- System of a Down
- Raubtier
- Parkway Drive
- Cradle of Filth
- At the Gates
- The Black Dahlia Murder
- Graveyard
- Soilwork
- Ghost
- Volbeat
- Watain
- Korn
- Khoma
- Cavalera Conspiracy
- All That Remains
- Doctor Midnight & The Mercy Cult
- F.K.Ü –
- Deicide
- Bring Me the Horizon
- Arch Enemy
- Avenged Sevenfold
- Anvil
- Bullet
- Human Desolation
- Madball
- Corroded

=== OFF Festival ===
- Ariel Pink's Haunted Graffiti
- Liars
- Meshuggah
- Current 93
- Actress
- Omar Souleyman
- Gablé
- Kury
- Kyst

=== Open'er Festival ===
- D4D
- Coldplay
- Paristetris
- Paolo Nutini
- Caribou
- Fat Freddy's Drop
- The Streets
- Pulp
- Foals
- Cut Copy
- Abraham Inc.
- Youssou N'Dour
- Primus
- The Wombats
- M.I.A.
- Hurts

=== Way Out West 2011 ===
- Ariel Pink's Haunted Graffiti
- The Avett Brothers
- Explosions in the Sky
- Fleet Foxes
- The Jayhawks
- Janelle Monáe
- Pulp
- Robyn
- Twin Shadow
- Thåström
- Warpaint
- Wiz Khalifa

== Deaths ==
- 1 January – Marin Constantin, 85, Romanian composer.
- 4 January – Stina-Britta Melander, 86, Swedish opera singer.

== See also ==
- 2010s in music

Preceded by 2010	European Music; 2011	Succeeded by 2012
