= Everlight =

Everlight may refer to:

- Everlight Electronics, a Taiwanese company which manufactures light-emitting diodes
- Everlight (album), a 2012 album by Dreamscape
- Everlight, a fictional goddess from The Legend of Vox Machina animated series
