= Soul Secret =

Italian progressive metal band from Naples

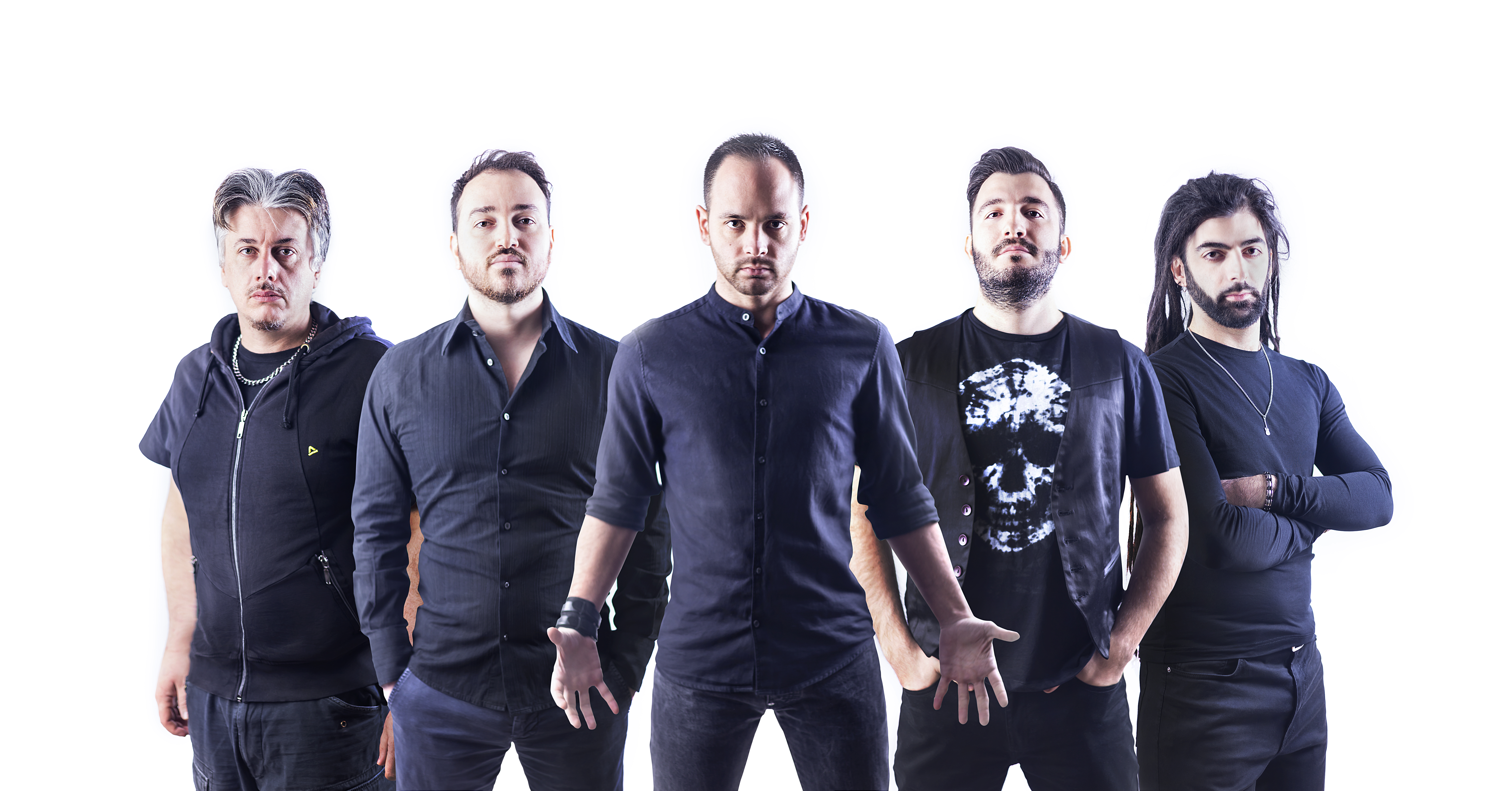

Background information
- Origin: Naples, Italy
- Genres: Progressive metal, progressive rock
- Years active: 2008–present
- Label: Layered Reality Productions
- Members: Claudio Casaburi; Francesco Cavezza; Luca Di Gennaro; Lino Di Pietrantonio; Antonio Mocerino
- Website: www.soulsecret.net

Soul Secret is an Italian progressive metal band that formed in 2004 in Naples, Italy.

They started as a cover band but as the years passed they started thinking about writing some original material. Thus they wrote a song called First Creature in 2006. The band decided to play live this song and after a good feedback they continued the writing process giving birth to an entire album titled Flowing Portraits. In 2007 the band decided to record the material at Orange Bug Studios. Just before entering the studios to record vocals, Michele Serpico had colitis and was unable to sing for a long time. In the studios the band got in touch with Mark Basile (DGM), who accepted to sing all the album as a guest, and with Davide Guidone. After listening the album he decided to join the project, becoming the band's manager. With him on board, the band was able to sign in 2008 under the American label ProgRock Records. In 2009 Michele Serpico felt better and he was able to sing in a gig during the Baltic Prog Fest in July but after that great experience he decided to leave Soul Secret definitively to let them search a stable singer, on stage and in studio. The band then started writing new material and planned to record drums at Musa Muta Studio during February 2010. The band contacted Arno Menses (Subsignal, ex-Sieges Even) who accepted to sing on their critically acclaimed suite Aftermath as a guest. Later they met Claudio Casaburi, their current bass player. With him the material written until that was radically changed, to have an album composed by the brand new Soul Secret lineup. The band then recorded bass, guitars and keyboards in their own studios. The album, later called Closer To Daylight, was mixed and mastered by Markus Teske. In 2013 the band decided to change singer and welcomed Lino Di Pietrantonio (vocals) on board to write and record the third album and perform live. The band's third album, titled 4 and their first concept, was published in April 2015. Their next album, another original concept called BABEL, was released on 28 July, 2017and previewed at Night of the Prog on 14 July 2017, with the band opening the show to Mike Portnoy's Shattered Fortress (also featuring members of Haken and Neal Morse Band) and later at the first edition of the Ready For Prog? Festival (formerly Very Prog Festival) with Persefone and Sons of Apollo. The band announced in 2018 Francesco Cavezza as the new guitar player and the band started writing new material. The dutch label Layered Reality Productions signed the band and planned to publish the band's fifth album around May 2020. After the COVID-19 pandemic spread all around the world, the band decided to delay the album release and to publish a single written during the quarantine called Shine Again exclusively on Bandcamp with all proceeds donated to charity. The band fifth album Blue Light Cage has been released worldwide on 23 October 2020 featuring Derek Sherinian and Marek Arnold.

== Reception ==
Musicwaves.fr described Flowing Portraits as "a pivotal album" even if just their debut album, while Dprp.net wrote that the highlight of the album is the last song, the epic called Tears Of Kalliroe, which features an amazing orchestral overture, followed by sheer brilliant prog metal passages. Closer To Daylight, the band's second album, passed with flying colours and scored the album 5 out of 5 on Allaroundmetal.com. Of the band's third album, a concept album titled 4, Progmetalzone.com wrote that the album is full of ambitious, technically accomplished and poignant material that showcases the strength of each and every single musician in the band, as well as the band's cohesiveness as a unit, as they have finally found a stable line-up after a few past changes. About BABEL, Progarchives wrote that it was worth 4.5 stars and a strong contender for a masterpiece status. The latest album Blue Light Cage gathered even more positive reviews, including "this fifth album is their best effort so far", "this is an album from another category" and "Opening Sequence is probably the best opening sequence I have heard in the past 23 years, ever since Fire Blossom by aforementioned Vanden Plas".

== Band members ==
Current members

- Claudio Casaburi – bass (2010–present)
- Francesco Cavezza – guitars (2018–present)
- Luca Di Gennaro – keyboards (2008–present)
- Lino Di Pietrantonio – vocals (2013–present)
- Antonio Mocerino – drums (2008–present)

Former members

- Antonio Vittozzi – guitars (2008–2017)
- Michele Serpico – vocals (2008–2009)
- Fabio Manda – vocals (2010–2013)
- Lucio Grilli – bass (2008–2010)

Guests

- Mark Basile – vocals on the entire album "Flowing Portraits" (2008)
- Anna Assentato – vocals on the song "If"
- Arno Menses – vocals on the song "Aftermath" (2011)
- Marco Sfogli – guitar solo on the song "River's Edge" (2011)
- Derek Sherinian – keyboard solos on the song "The Ghost Syndicate" (2020)
- Marek Arnold – sax solos on the song "Blue Light Cage" (2020)

== Discography ==
=== Flowing Portraits (2008) ===
The album, released on ProgRock Records, features Mark Basile (DGM) on vocals, as the band's singer, Michele Serpico, had health problems just before entering the studio to record.

==== Tracks ====
1. Dance of the Waves – 7:23 – (music by Soul Secret – lyrics by Michele Serpico)
2. First Creature – 7:35 – (Soul Secret – Serpico)
3. Inner War – 8:08 – (Soul Secret – Serpico)
4. Learning To Lose – 7:12 – (Soul Secret – Serpico)
5. Regrets – 4:28 – (Soul Secret – Serpico)
6. Tears Of Kalliroe – 16:42

I. Sailing in the Arms of the Ocean (instrumental) – (Di Gennaro)
II. Be My Temple – (Soul Secret – Serpico)
III. Moving Silhouettes – (Soul Secret – Serpico)
IV. Against My Own Mind (instrumental) – (Soul Secret)
V. Baptism Of Flaming Waters – (Soul Secret – Serpico)

==== Guests ====
- Mark Basile – vocals

==== Production ====
- Salvio Imparato – sound engineer, mixing
- Karl Groom – mastering
- Nello Dell'Omo – artwork

=== Closer to Daylight (2011) ===
Closer To Daylight, released on Galileo Records, is the band's second studio album.

==== Tracks ====
1. Checkmate – 5:51 – (music by Soul Secret – lyrics by Antonio Mocerino)
2. River's Edge – 6:48 – (Soul Secret – Mocerino)
3. If – 3:48 – (Soul Secret – Di Gennaro)
4. The Shelter – 7:52 – (Soul Secret – Di Gennaro)
5. Pillars Of Sand – 9:09 – (Soul Secret – Di Gennaro)
6. October 1917 – 3:34 – (Manda, Vittozzi – Vittozzi)
7. Behind The Curtain – 8:47 – (Soul Secret – Di Gennaro)
8. Aftermath – 16:43 – (Casaburi, Di Gennaro, Menses, Mocerino, Vittozzi – Vittozzi, Di Gennaro)

==== Guests ====
- Marco Sfogli – guitar solo on River's Edge
- Anna Assentato – second voice on If
- Arno Menses – vocals in Aftermath

==== Production ====
- Tommaso Allocca – sound engineer
- Markus Teske – mixing, mastering
- Alexandra V Bach – artwork

=== 4 (2015) ===
4, released on Golden Core Records/ZYX, is the band's third album, and their first concept album.

==== Tracks ====
1. On The Ledge – 8:36 – (music by Soul Secret – lyrics by Luca Di Gennaro)
2. Our Horizon – 7:00 – (Soul Secret – Di Gennaro)
3. K – 5:43 – (Soul Secret – Di Gennaro)
4. As I Close My Eyes – 2:00 – (Di Gennaro – Di Gennaro)
5. Traces on the Seaside – 4:47 – (Soul Secret – Di Gennaro)
6. Turning The Back Page – 6:50 – (Soul Secret – Di Gennaro)
7. Silence (instrumental) – 5:20 – (Soul Secret)
8. In A Frame – 3:47 – (Soul Secret – Di Gennaro)
9. My Lighthouse – 6:36 – (Soul Secret – Di Gennaro)
10. Downfall – 5:05 – (Soul Secret – Di Gennaro)
11. The White Stairs – 16:44 – (Soul Secret – Di Gennaro)

==== Guests ====
- Simone Bertozzi – growl vocals on "K", "Traces On The Seaside" and "The White Stairs"
- Arturo Muselli – Adam
- Victoria Acampora – Anne
- Jasmine Wang – Anchorwoman on "On The Ledge"
- Mel McMahon – Reporter on "On The Ledge"
- Dylan Ogle – Boss on "Our Horizon", Dr. Greedy on "K"
- Giulia Fiume – Radio speaker on "Traces On The Seaside"

==== Production ====
- Jordan Valeriote – mixing
- Troy Glessner – mastering
- Razorimages – artwork

=== BABEL (2017) ===
BABEL, released on Pride & Joy Music, is the band's fourth album, and their second concept album.

==== Tracks ====
1. Prologue – 1:08 – (music by Soul Secret – lyrics by Luca Di Gennaro)
2. What We're All About – 5:56 – (Soul Secret – Di Gennaro)
3. A Shadow on the Surface – 4:37 – (Soul Secret – Di Gennaro)
4. Will They? – 5:57 – (Soul Secret – Di Gennaro)
5. logOS – 2:22 – (Di Gennaro – Di Gennaro)
6. Awakened by the Light – 7:39 – (Soul Secret – Di Gennaro)
7. Entering The City Of Gods – 10:59 – (Soul Secret – Di Gennaro)
8. The Cuckoo's Nest – 6:59 – (Soul Secret – Di Gennaro)
9. Newton's Law – 7:49 – (Soul Secret – Di Gennaro)
10. In The Hardest Of Times – 14:08 – (Soul Secret – Di Gennaro)

==== Guests ====
- Mark Manning – Narrator
- Andy Kowowski – Sam
- Niabi Manning – Adriel
- Dorsey Jackson – logOS

==== Production ====
- Alex Argento – mixing, mastering
- Thomas Ewerhard – artwork

=== Shine Again (single) (2020) ===
Shine Again, released on Layered Reality Productions, is a charity single written by the band during the COVID-19 pandemic lockdown, with all of its proceeds to be donated to the World Health Organization.

==== Tracks ====
1. Shine Again – 05:51 – (music by Francesco Cavezza – lyrics by Francesco Cavezza)

==== Guests ====
- Tom de Wit – guest singer

==== Production ====
- Tom de Wit – mixing
- Rich Gray (formerly Rich Hinks) – mastering
- Claudio Casaburi – artwork

=== Blue Light Cage (2020) ===
Blue Light Cage, released on Layered Reality Productions, is the band's fifth studio album, featuring Derek Sherinian and Marek Arnold.

==== Tracks ====
1. Opening Sequence (instrumental) – 3:00 – (music by Casaburi, Di Gennaro)
2. The Ghost Syndicate – 5:26 – (Di Gennaro, Mocerino – lyrics by Di Gennaro)
3. A President's Speech – 6:00 – (Casaburi, Di Gennaro, Di Pietrantonio – Di Gennaro)
4. Switch On (instrumental) – 1:42 – (Casaburi)
5. Blue Light Cage – 4:50 – (Di Gennaro, Di Pietrantonio – Di Pietrantonio)
6. We'll Become Dust – 7:22 – (Casaburi, Cavezza, Di Gennaro, Di Pietrantonio, Mocerino – Mocerino)
7. Going Home – 5:45 – (Di Gennaro – Mocerino)
8. Jump Right In – 7:00 – (Casaburi, Di Gennaro, Di Pietrantonio – Di Gennaro, Di Pietrantonio)
9. Breathe and Recover – 13:00 – (Casaburi, Di Gennaro – Casaburi)

==== Guests ====
- Derek Sherinian – keyboard solos on The Ghost Syndicate
- Marek Arnold – sax solos on Blue Light Cage
- Tom Gallagher – new-anchor on A President's Speech
- Joe Prestia – spoken words on We'll Become Dust

==== Production ====
- Virus Studio – mixing, mastering
- Nello Dell'Omo – artwork
- Copy editing – Jasmine Wang
- Project supervision – Davide Guidone
