= 2010 in European music =

The following is a list of notable events and releases that occurred in 2010 in mainland European music.

== Events ==
=== January – March ===
- February 12 – Jesper Strömblad quits In Flames.
- March 29 – Protesters interrupt a concert by the Jerusalem Quartet at London's Wigmore Hall.

=== April – June ===
- May 8–9 – Collective premiere of the 21 works of the Klang cycle by Karlheinz Stockhausen takes place in Cologne, Germany, by members of musikFabrik and others, in 176 individual concerts, as part of the MusikTriennale Köln.
- May 18 – The 2010 World Music Awards ceremony is held in Monte Carlo, Monaco. Guest performers include Andrea Bocelli and Tiziano Ferro.
- May 29 – The Final of the 55th annual Eurovision Song Contest takes place in Oslo, Norway. It is won by 19-year-old singer Lena Meyer-Landrut, singing Satellite and representing Germany.
- Rock in Rio Festival returns to Lisbon, Portugal and Madrid, Spain.

=== July – September ===
- Toto temporarily reform for a short tour through Europe in honor of their former bassist Mike Porcaro, who suffers from ALS.
- July 24 – The last Loveparade took place in Duisburg implying the deaths of 21 people.

=== October – December ===
- December 4 – Norwegian group A-ha break up with a concert in Oslo at the end of a world tour.

== Groups reformed ==
- WIZO
- Sôber
- Atari Teenage Riot

== Groups disbanded ==
- A-ha
- Scorpions
- Turbonegro

== Albums set to be released ==
=== January ===
January 20

- Waiting For the Bells by Joel Alme

Unspecific date

- Sons of the System by Mnemic

=== February ===
8

- The Underworld Regime by Ov Hell

February 9

- Screamworks: Love in Theory and Practice, Chapters 1–13 by HIM

February 19

- Grosse Freiheit by Unheilig

February 23

- Work by Shout Out Louds

February 24

- We Are The Void by Dark Tranquility

=== March ===
8

- Belus by Burzum

15

- The Longest Year by Katatonia

=== April ===
7

- Threnody by Engel

April 9

- Vom Vintage verweht by Dendemann

21

- Road Kill by The Haunted

=== July ===
2

- The Panic Broadcast by Soilwork

July 13

- Excavations of the Mind by Sky Architect

20

- The Sledgehammer Files: The Best of Soilwork 1998-2008 by Soilwork

=== September ===
20

- In Live Concert at the Royal Albert Hall by Opeth

22

- Abrahadabra by Dimmu Borgir

September 27

- Fall from Grace by Infernal

28

- A Thin Shell by October Tide

=== Unspecified date ===
- Blood of the Nations by Accept
- Untitled by Blind Guardian
- Untitled by Blindside
- Henzi by Kraftwerk
- Sting in the Tail by Scorpions
- Untitled by Valkyrja
- Untitled by WIZO
- Untitled by Lena Katina
- The Seven Temptations by Doda
- Untitled by Anna Vissi

== Musical films ==
- Chico and Rita, animation with music by Bebo Valdés (Spain/UK)
- Gainsbourg: A Heroic Life, biopic of Serge Gainsbourg starring Eric Elmosnino (France)
- Konferenz der Tiere, animation with music by David Newman (Germany)
- Winx Club 3D: Magical Adventure, animation with music by Paolo Baglio (Italy)
- Zeiten ändern dich, starring German rapper Bushido, and based on his autobiography (Germany) (Germany)

== Classical ==
- Hans Werner Henze – Der Opfergang, for choir
- Magnus Lindberg – Al largo for orchestra
- Wolfgang Rihm – Gegenstück for bass saxophon, percussion and piano (revised version)

== Deaths ==
- March 10 – Peter Van Wood, 82, Dutch guitarist, singer, songwriter, actor and astrologer.
- March 16 – Ksenija Pajčin, 32, Serbian singer.
- June 3 – Elodie Lauten, French-American composer and educator, 63
- June 10 – Rock-Olga (Birgit Magnusson), 70, Swedish rock singer.
- August 20 – Charles Haddon, 22, Lead singer of British synthpop/electropop group 'Ou est le swimming pool'.
- December 30 – Bobby Farrell, 61, Frontman of Boney M.

== See also ==
- 2010s in music

Preceded by 2009	European Music; 2010	Succeeded by 2011
