= A Dying Man's Hymn =

Studio album by Sky Architect
- Released: 6 June 2011
- Recorded: Sweden 2010–2011
- Genre: Progressive rock, Jazz fusion
- Length: 77:13
- Label: (European Union) Galileo Records (United States) ProgRock Records
- Producer: Wabe Wieringa, Rik van Honk

Sky Architect chronology
Excavations of the Mind (2010)	A Dying Man's Hymn (2011)

A Dying Man's Hymn is the second studio album by Dutch progressive rock band Sky Architect released on 6 June 2011 on Galileo Records. The album art was drawn by Mark Wilkinson.

== Track listing ==
Credits adapted from Spotify.

No.	Title	Writer(s)	Length
1.	"Treebird"	Wabe Wieringa	9:14
2.	"Melody of the Air – Expositio"	Tom Luchies; Wieringa	6:16
3.	"The Campfire Ghost Song"	Wieringa	10:00
4.	"Woodcutters Vile"	Luchies; Wieringa	12:58
5.	"Melody of the Air – Explicatio"	Christian Bruin; Guus Van Mierlo; Luchies; Wieringa	11:14
6.	"The Breach"	Luchies; Wieringa	11:05
7.	"Hitodama's Return"	Wieringa	6:37
8.	"Melody of the Air – Recapitulatio"	Bruin; Rik Van Honk; Wieringa	4:38
9.	"A Dying Man's Hymn"	Wieringa	5:11
Total length:			77:13

== Personnel ==
- Christiaan Bruin- Drums, Vocals (background), engineer
- Tom Luchies- Guitar, Vocals
- Rik Van Honk- Synthesizer, Keyboards, Vocals (background), engineer, Mastering, Grand Piano
- Guus Van Mierlo- Bass guitar
- Wabe Wieringa- Guitar, producer, engineer, Mixing
