= Excavations of the Mind =

Album by Sky Architect

Studio album by Sky Architect
- Released: 2010
- Recorded: 2010
- Genre: Progressive metal, progressive rock, jazz fusion
- Length: 51:05
- Label: US:ProgRock; EU:Galileo
- Producer: Wabe Wieringa

Sky Architect chronology
Excavations of the Mind (2010)	A Dying Man's Hymn (2011)

Excavations of the Mind is the debut album by Dutch progressive rock band Sky Architect. It is a concept album about the mentally insane. The first four tracks are parts of a 19-minute suite Deep Chasm. The album cover artist, Mark Wilkinson, is well known for his work with Fish, Marillion, Judas Priest, and sometimes Iron Maiden.

== Track listing ==
The Deep Chasm suite is broken into four tracks on the album.

All tracks are written by Sky Architect

No.	Title	Length
1.	"Deep Chasm": I. Charter (3:38); II. Chime (8:03); III. Changeling (0:42); IV. Chasm (6:45)"	19:08
2.	"The Grey Legend"	12:10
3.	"Russian Wisdom"	5:04
4.	"Excavations of the Mind"	11:45
5.	"Gyrocopter"	2:58
Total length:		51:05

=== Personnel ===
- Christiaan Bruin- Drums, Vocals (background), engineer
- Tom Luchies- Guitar, Vocals
- Rik Van Honk- Synthesizer Keyboards, Vocals (background), engineer, Mastering, Grand Piano
- Guus Van Mierlo- Bass guitar
- Wabe Wieringa- Guitar, producer, engineer, Mixing
