= Jolly (group) =

American progressive metal/alternative metal band

Jolly (aka The Incredible Jolly)
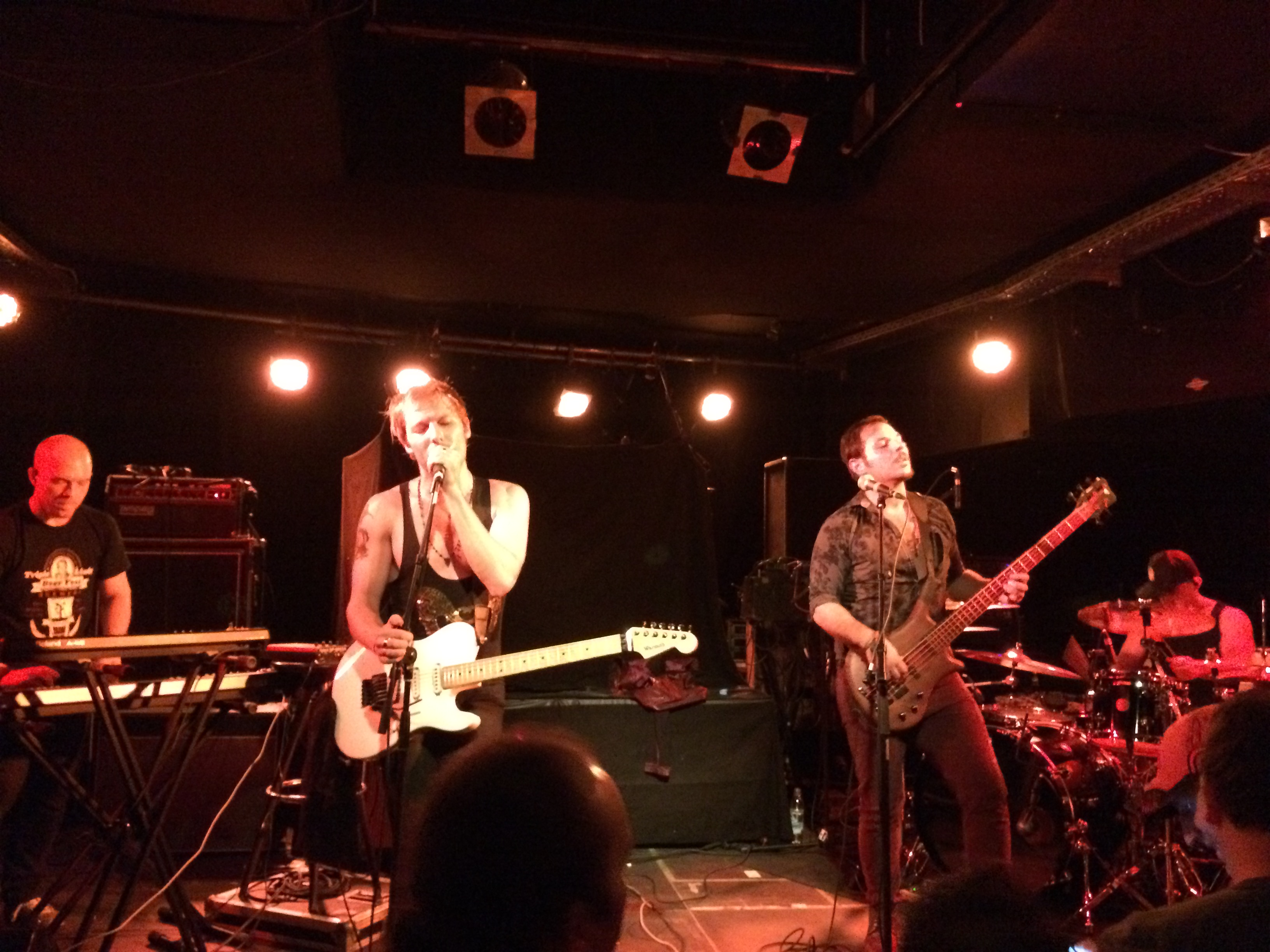
- Jolly performing live in Munich in 2014

Background information
- Origin: New York City, United States
- Genres: Progressive metal, Alternative metal
- Years active: 2006-present
- Labels: Inside Out Music
- Members: Anadale; Joe Reilly; Louis Abramson; Anthony Rondinone
- Website: www.jollyband.com

Jolly is an American progressive metal/alternative metal band from New York City, also known as The Incredible Jolly.

== History ==
Jolly names Tears For Fears, Radiohead up to Pink Floyd their influences in their style. In 2006, the 4 members of the band met each other on internet forums and formed the idea to release an EP with own material, as the Swiss label Galileo Records took notice of their YouTube videos. The band signed with Galileo in 2006. The first album released on that label was named Forty Six Minutes, Twelve Seconds. Jolly toured with Riverside and Pure Reason Revolution outside the United States, mainly in Europe. After finding success on Galileo, the band signed with InsideOut Music.

With the album The Audio Guide To Happiness Vol. I, the band stated the rumor of binaural tones on that album.

Mike Portnoy invited the band to be opener of his supergroup Flying Colors. Portnoy has also been featured in one Jolly music video.

In 2014, the band performed at ProgPower Europe.

In 2015, the band switched to using Patreon to fund continued music composition and recording. Joe Reilly, the keyboardist, has stated that the band has built a reputation for closeness with fans and a heavy reliance on fans when touring, and Patreon is a way of allowing the fans to directly support the band's music and video creation.

In 2016, Jolly began releasing episodes of a cartoon webseries called the JOLLYSHOW. The first episode featured the appearance, and death, of a fictionalized version of Steven Wilson.

== Discography ==
- 2009: Forty Six Minutes, Twelve Seconds of Music
- 2011: The Audio Guide to Happiness Vol. I
- 2013: The Audio Guide to Happiness Vol. II
- 2019: Family
