= David Bertok =

German composer and pianist (born 1981)

- Born: 1981 (age 44–45); Bratislava, Czechoslovakia
- Origin: Munich, Germany
- Genres: Film score, concert music, progressive rock, neoclassical
- Occupations: Composer, pianist, orchestrator, producer
- Years active: 2008–present
- Website: www.davidbertok.com

David Bertok (born 1981) is a German composer and pianist known for his work in film and television. In 2025, he won a Primetime Emmy Award for Outstanding Music Composition for a Documentary Series or Special for his work on the Netflix series Chef's Table (specifically the episode "José Andrés").

== Early life and education ==
Bertok was born in Bratislava, Czechoslovakia (now Slovakia). He studied classical piano and composition, later attending the University of Southern California (USC) where he graduated from the Scoring for Motion Pictures and Television (SMPTV) program.

== Career ==
Bertok's career includes work as a composer for independent films and documentary series. His work on the Netflix series Chef's Table earned him a Primetime Emmy Award in 2025.

In addition to his film work, Bertok has contributed to the progressive rock and metal scenes. He was a member of the German band Subsignal, appearing on the albums Touchstones (2011), Paraíso (2013) and A Poetry of Rain (2023) which reached the German Media Control Charts.

== Discography ==
With Subsignal:

- Beautiful & Monstrous (2009)
- Touchstones (2011)
- Out There Must Be Something (2012, Live DVD)
- Paraíso (2013)

With Dreamscape:

- Everlight (2012)

Own compositions:

- Botero (2018)
- Peace by Chocolate (2021)
- One (2024)
