= Darkwater (band) =

Swedish progressive metal band

- Origin: Borås, Sweden
- Genres: Progressive metal
- Years active: 2003-present
- Label: Ulterium Records
- Members: Henrik Båth; Markus Sigfridsson; Magnus Holmberg; Simon Andersson; Tobias Enbert
- Website: darkwater.se

Darkwater is a progressive metal band from Borås, Sweden.

== History ==
The band was formed late 2003 in the western parts of Sweden. During the first years of existence, they only did a few selected shows in Sweden while working on the material for their debut album. During summer and fall 2006, Darkwater recorded and mixed the album, and in early 2007, a deal was signed with the Swedish label Ulterium Records.

The debut album Calling the Earth to Witness was released in May 2007 and received good reviews worldwide. Darkwater's blend of melodic and progressive metal took inspiration from bands like Symphony X, Dream Theater, Andromeda, and Evergrey.

In May 2008, Darkwater recorded and released a music video for the track “The Play II” and in June they did their first show in the US, at the Bay Area Rock Fest together with Liquid Tension Experiment and Jeff Scott Soto among others.

After additional touring in Europe, including at ProgPower Europe 2010, Darkwater released their second album Where Stories End in late 2010. Although differing slightly from the debut, being more direct and song-oriented than Calling the Earth to Witness, the follow-up became equally critically acclaimed as the debut. A music video promoted the album, "Breathe".

In September 2011, Darkwater participated at the 12th edition of ProgPower USA.

In 2013, the band announced via Facebook that they were working on their third album, which they anticipated would be released sometime in 2015. They released their new album Human eventually in March 2019.

== Discography ==
- Calling the Earth to Witness (28 May 2007)
- Where Stories End (22 November 2010)
- Human (1 March 2019)
