= D'Erp Castle =

Castle in Limburg, Netherlands

Coordinates: 51.3295°N 6.0996°E

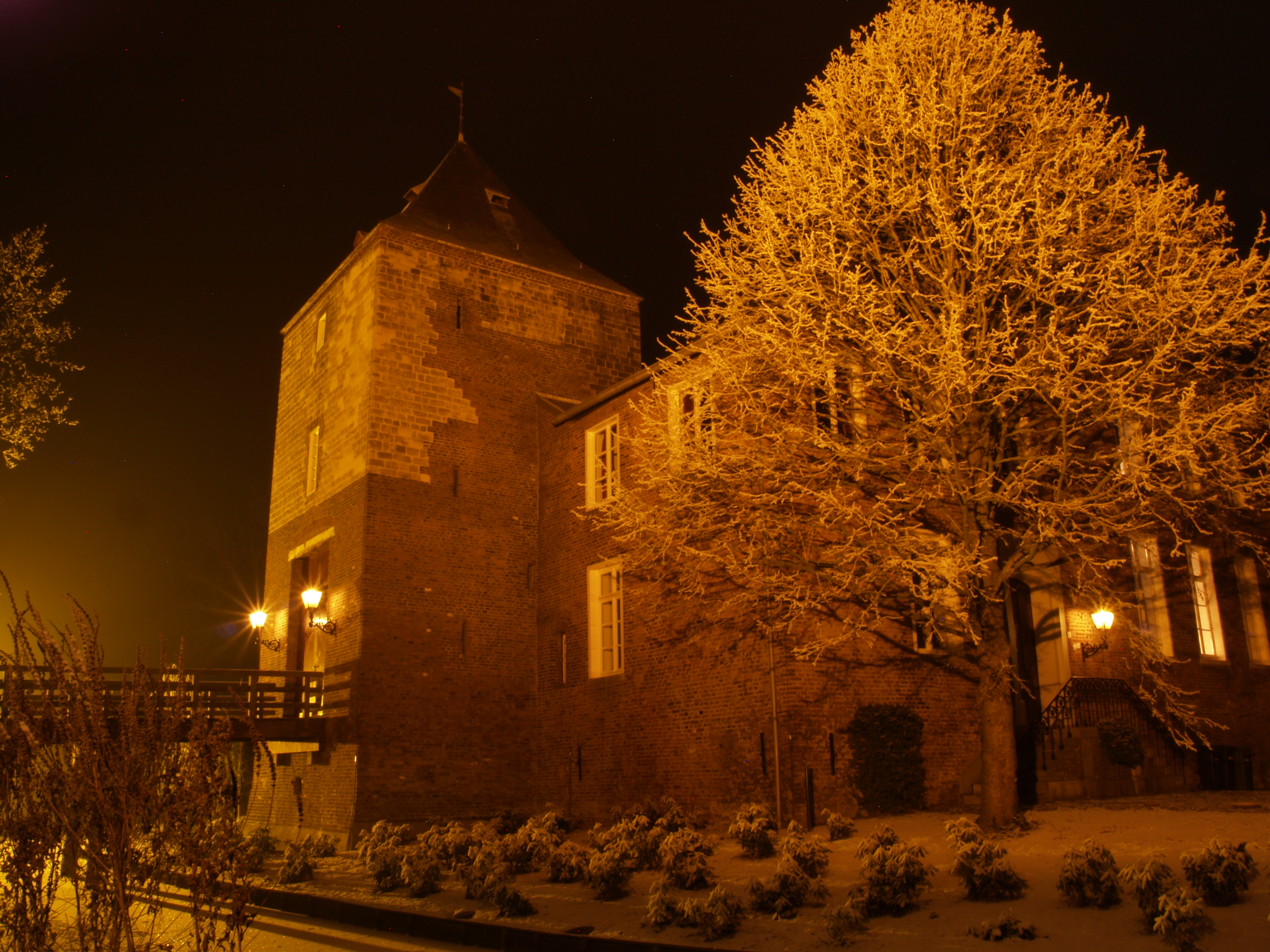
D'Erp Castle after snowfall in the evening.

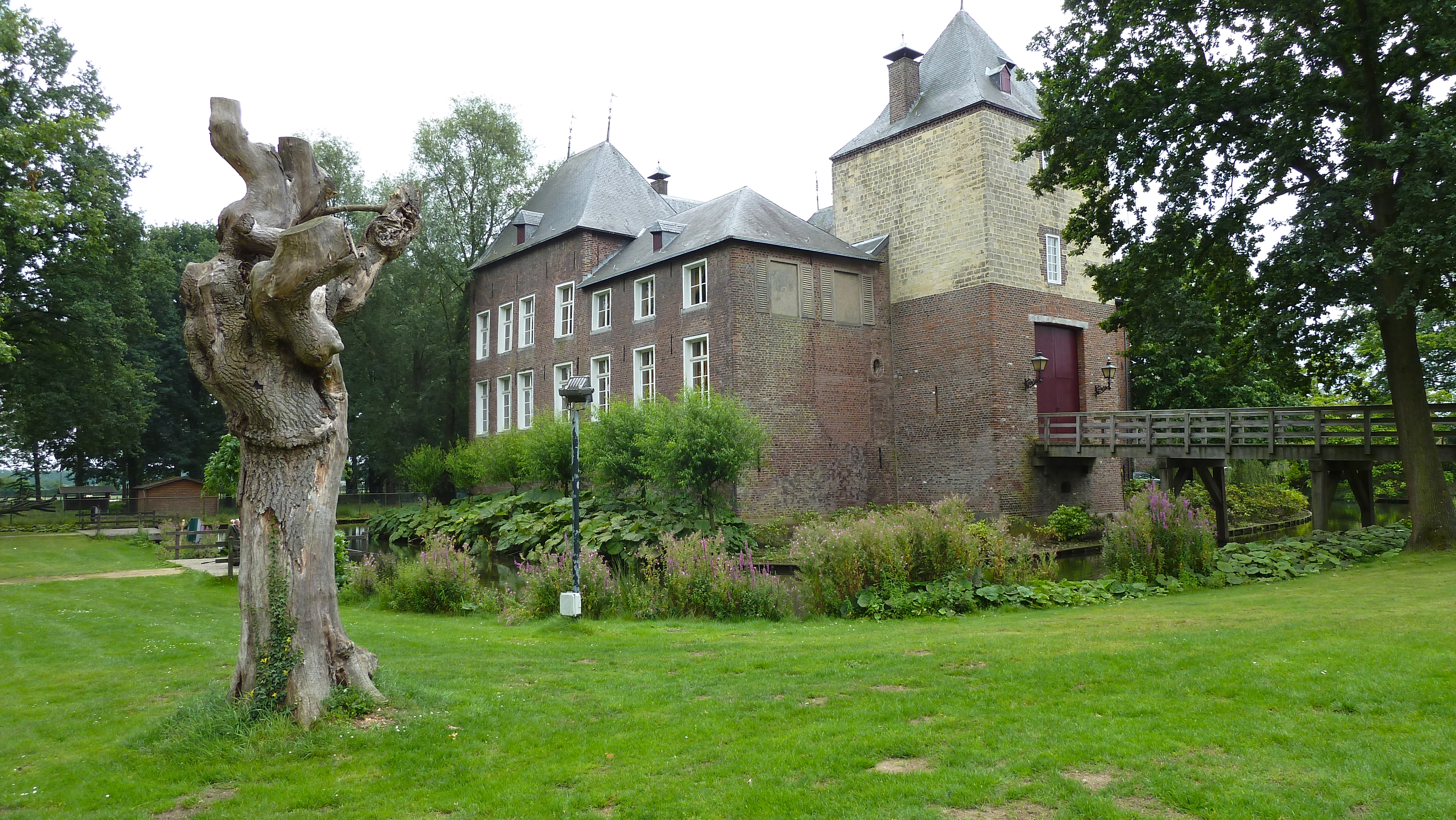
D'Erp Castle

D'Erp Castle, also known as De Borcht, (Dutch: Kasteel d'Erp or De Borcht) is a castle in Baarlo, Limburg, Netherlands. Dating back to the 13th century, it withstood sieges by William the Silent and Frederick Henry, Prince of Orange. The castle is currently privately owned and not open the public.
