= Schizoid Lloyd =

Dutch metal band

- Origin: Haarlem, The Netherlands
- Genres: Progressive metal, symphonic metal
- Years active: 2007–present
- Label: Blood Music (2016-)
- Members: Ruben Kuhlmann; Thom Lich; Boy van Ooijen; Remo Kuhlmann; Guus van Oosterum
- Past members: Daan Divendal
- Website: www.schizoidlloyd.nl

Schizoid Lloyd is a Dutch progressive metal band from Haarlem.

== Biography ==
The band was established in October 2007. They won the Rob Acda Award in Haarlem in 2008, and that same year released their self-produced debut EP Virus, assisted by producer Oscar Hollemann (Ayreon, Within Temptation), which received a mostly positive review by 3VOOR12.

In 2010, the band was selected for NH-Pop Live, the year-long talent competition for bands from North Holland, and released the EP Circus.

In 2011 they played at ProgPower Europe in Baarlo, The Netherlands, with Symphony X, Redemption and Long Distance Calling.

In August 2013, they did two shows in Norway. They headlined a show in Oslo at Betong, and they played the Brynerocken Festival in Bryne.

In 2014, they signed a contract with the label Blood Music.

In 2015, they returned to ProgPower Europe in Baarlo, The Netherlands, with Pagan's Mind, Soen, Enchant and headliner Leprous.

== Members ==
- Boy van Ooijen (drums and percussion)
- Thom Lich (guitar, vocals)
- Ruben Kuhlmann (keyboards, percussions, vocals)
- Remo Kuhlmann (guitar, vocals)
- Silas Baldur van Bezu (keyboards)
- Guus van Oosterum (bass guitar, vocals)

== Discography ==
- Virus (EP) (2009)
- Circus (EP) (2010)
- The Last Note In God's Magnum Opus (Album) (2014)
