= Moongarden =

- Origin: Italy
- Genres: Progressive rock
- Years active: 1993-present
- Labels: Galileo Records, ProgRock Records, SPV
- Members: Cristiano Roversi; David Cremoni; Mirko Tagliasacchi; Simone Baldini Tosi; Gigi Cavalli Occhi
- Past members: Adolfo Bonati; Massimiliano Sorrenti; Dimitri Sardini; Luca Palleschi; Luca Dell'Anna; Marco Tafelli; Maurizio Di Tollo
- Website: https://www.moongardenofficial.com

Moongarden is a progressive rock group formed in Italy in 1993. They have been compared to Porcupine Tree, Marillion and Genesis. The group records and distributes their music under the label of Galileo Records.

== History ==
The band was founded in 1993 when co-founders Cristiano Roversi (keyboards, bass), David Cremoni (guitars), and Adolfo Bonati (drums) recorded some demo tracks, which were subsequently picked up by the Italian label Mellow Records and released as an album named Moonsadness in 1994. Following the release of this album, Bonati departed and was replaced by Massimiliano Sorrenti, with guitarist Dimitri Sardini joining the band at the same time. Building on the foundation that Moonsadness had given them, the band recorded two Genesis covers for The First Italian Tribute to Genesis, before starting work on their second album, Brainstorm of Emptyness. Following the completion of the album, the band recorded another cover (the track "There Will be Time" by Osanna) for the '70s Italian Progressive Tribute Album, following which Sardini left the band.

During the following four years, Moongarden underwent a period of inactivity, mainly due to personal troubles suffered by the band's remaining three members. Following this hiatus, vocalist Luca Palleschi and keyboardist Luca Dell'Anna joined the band (with Roversi acting as bassist), and the critically acclaimed album The Gates of Omega was released. In the period leading up to the band's next album, 2003's Round Midnight, Dell'Anna left the band, leading Roversi to revert to keyboards, and Mirko Tagliasacchi joined the group on bass. Shortly following the release of Round Midnight, founding guitarist David Cremoni departed the band, and was replaced by Marco Tafelli.

More lineup changes ensued with the departure of Palleschi and Sorrentini in 2005 due to artistic differences, with their positions being filled by Simone Baldini Tosi and Maurizio Di Tollo respectively. Baldini Tosi had previously worked with the band as session vocalist on their debut album, Moonsadness. This lineup recorded 2008's Songs From The Lighthouse before David Cremoni returned to the band to replace his successor, Marco Tafelli. Following Cremoni's return, the band released the album A Vulgar Display of Prog. During the next few years, the band did not conduct much activity due to Roversi and Cremoni working on their side project, Submarine Silence. However, in 2013 Gigi Cavalli Occhi joined the band, replacing Maurizio Di Tollo on drums, and the band commenced work on a new, currently untitled, album.

== Personnel ==
=== Members ===
Current members

- Cristiano Roversi - keyboards, bass, Chapman stick (1993–present)
- David Cremoni - electric and acoustic guitars (1993–2003, 2009–present)
- Mirko Tagliasacchi - fretted and fretless basses (2003–present)
- Simone Baldini Tosi - vocals, guitar (2005–present)
- Gigi Cavalli Occhi - drums, percussion (2013–present)

Former members

- Adolfo Bonati - drums, percussion (1993–1995)
- Massimiliano Sorrenti - drums, percussion (1995–2005)
- Dimitri Sardini - guitars (1995–1996)
- Luca Palleschi - vocals (2000–2005)
- Luca Dell'Anna - keyboards (2000–2003)
- Marco Tafelli - guitar, violin (2003–2009)
- Maurizio Di Tollo - drums, percussion (2005–2013)

=== Lineups ===
1993–1995	1995–1996	1996–2000	2000–2003
Cristiano Roversi - keyboards, bass, Chapman stick; David Cremoni - electric and acoustic guitars; Adolfo Bonati - drums, percussion	Cristiano Roversi - keyboards, bass, Chapman stick; David Cremoni - electric and acoustic guitars; Massimiliano Sorrenti - drums, percussion; Dimitri Sardini - guitars	Cristiano Roversi - keyboards, bass, Chapman stick; David Cremoni - electric and acoustic guitars; Massimiliano Sorrenti - drums, percussion	Cristiano Roversi - keyboards, bass, Chapman stick; David Cremoni - electric and acoustic guitars; Massimiliano Sorrenti - drums, percussion; Luca Palleschi - vocals; Luca Dell'Anna - keyboards
2003	2003–2005	2005–2009	2009–2013
Cristiano Roversi - keyboards, bass, Chapman stick; David Cremoni - electric and acoustic guitars; Massimiliano Sorrenti - drums, percussion; Luca Palleschi - vocals; Mirko Tagliasacchi - fretted and fretless basses	Cristiano Roversi - keyboards, bass, Chapman stick; Massimiliano Sorrenti - drums, percussion; Luca Palleschi - vocals; Mirko Tagliasacchi - fretted and fretless basses; Marco Tafelli - guitar, violin	Cristiano Roversi - keyboards, bass, Chapman stick; Mirko Tagliasacchi - fretted and fretless basses; Marco Tafelli - guitar, violin; Simone Baldini Tosi - vocals, guitar; Maurizio Di Tollo - drums, percussion	Cristiano Roversi - keyboards, bass, Chapman stick; David Cremoni - electric and acoustic guitars; Mirko Tagliasacchi - fretted and fretless basses; Simone Baldini Tosi - vocals, guitar; Maurizio Di Tollo - drums, percussion
2013–present
Cristiano Roversi - keyboards, bass, Chapman stick; David Cremoni - electric and acoustic guitars; Mirko Tagliasacchi - fretted and fretless basses; Simone Baldini Tosi - vocals, guitar; Gigi Cavalli Occhi - drums, percussion

== Discography ==
- Moonsadness (1994)
- Brainstorm of Emptiness (1995)
- The Gates of Omega (2001)
- Round Midnight (2003)
- Songs from the Lighthouse (2008)
- A Vulgar Display of Prog (2009)
- Voyeur (2014)
- Align Myself to the Universe (2018)
- Christmas Night 2066 (2023)
