= 5th Season =

Studio album by Dreamscape
- Released: September 21, 2007
- Genre: Progressive metal
- Length: 63:12
- Label: Massacre Records

Dreamscape chronology
Revoiced (2005)	5th Season (2007)	Everlight (2012)

5th Season is the fourth studio album by the German progressive metal band Dreamscape.

It was rated a 90 out of 100 by MetalReviews.com.

== Track listing ==
1. "Fed Up With" – 5:29
2. "Borderline" – 5:12
3. "5th Season" – 14:35
4. "Deja Vu" – 5:27
5. "Somebody" – 4:28
6. "Phenomenon" – 7:48
7. "Different" – 7:10
8. "Point Zero" – 7:57
9. "Farewell" – 5:06
