= Dreamscape (band) =

Progressive metal band from Munich, Germany

- Origin: München, Germany
- Genre: Progressive metal
- Years active: 1986–present
- Labels: Rising Sun Records; Connected Records; Massacre Records
- Members: Francesco Marino; Wolfgang Kerinnis; Fabian Ziegler; David Bertok; Danilo Batdorf
- Past members: see below
- Website: http://www.dreamscape.de/

Dreamscape is a progressive metal band from Munich, Germany.

== History ==
=== Origins ===
Dreamscape was founded by Wolfgang Kerinnis (lead guitarist) and Stefan Gassner (rhythm guitarist) in 1986. After numerous changes in the line-up, Tobi Zoltan (singer), Andreas Angerer (drummer) and Benno Schmidtler (bass guitarist) were hired to perform full-time with them. After very thorough preparations, they started performing live in 1992.

=== The Demos ===
After a few more line-up changes, they produced three demos in between 1993 and 1995: Dreamscape, Decisions and Changes.

=== Trance-like State ===
In 1996, the band recorded its first full-length album in their own studio, titled Trance-like State. It was released through Rising Sun Records almost a year later in 1997.

In the wake of the CD production, the band decided that they needed a keyboard player as a permanent member, hiring Jan Vacik to fill the spot. Vacik's hiring caused a rift, and as a result three members left, including the founding member Gassner.

During the twelve months between recording and releasing, the band had already created new songs but were delayed once more when Zoltan, the lead vocalist, was asked to leave due to what was called 'lack of motivation'. Hubi Meisel replaced Zoltan as vocalist.

=== Very and End of Silence ===
After a tour to support the first album, the band released a second album, Very, in 1999. Since then, there have been several line-up changes.

The band's third album, End of Silence, was released in 2004 and a compilation album, Revoiced, in 2005.

=== 5th Season and Everlight ===
In 2007, the band released 5th Season and in 2008 they toured with Sieges Even, Circus Maximus and Symphony X. After the tour, Danilo Batdorf replaced Schwager as drummer.

Also in 2008 Dreamscape and Lanfear had planned on performing concerts with each other, but their newly hired lead vocalist Mischa Mang left the band to concentrate on another band named Ivanhoe, thus postponing the shows indefinitely.

On 2 April 2009, the band announced that Erik Blomkvist, formerly of Platitude, would be their new lead vocalist, and that he was scheduled to appear on their new album However, he left soon after production and recording had started, due to unforeseen health problems.

The Italian vocalist Francesco (or Frank) Marino signed on to complete the album, and was listed as the lead singer also performing live with the band. Blomkvist sang on at least one of the album tracks, which was released in 2012, titled Everlight. After the release of Everlight the band became less active. Keyboardist David Bertok, drummer Danilo Batdorf and former bassist Ralf Schwager joined Sieges Even's successor Subsignal.

== Line-up ==
=== Current members ===
- Francesco Marino – vocals
- Wolfgang Kerinnis – guitars
- Fabian Ziegler – bass guitar
- David Bertok – keyboards
- Danilo Batdorf – drums

=== Former members ===
==== Vocalists ====
- Roland Stoll
- Tobi Zoltan
- Hubi Meisel
- Mischa Mang

==== Rhythm guitarists ====
- Stefan Gassner

==== Bass guitarists ====
- Benno Schmidtler
- Christoh Gastl
- Ralf Watson Schwager

==== Drummers ====
- Thomas Hecht
- Stefan Petzoldt
- Bernhard Huber
- Klaus Engel
- Michael Schwager

==== Keyboards ====
- Jan Vacik

== Discography ==
- Dreamscape (demo, 1993)
- Decisions (demo, 1994)
- Changes (demo, 1995)
- Trance-like State (full-length, 1997)
- Very (full-length, 1999)
- End of Silence (full-length, 2004)
- Revoiced (compilation, 2005)
- 5th Season (full-length, 2007)
- Everlight (full-length, 2012)
