= Teramaze =

Australian progressive metal band

- Teramaze in 2026

Background information
- Origin: Geelong, Victoria, Australia
- Genres: Progressive metal, heavy metal
- Years active: 1995–2002; 2012–present
- Labels: Wells Music; Mascot label Group; Nightmare Records; Jellyfish; Salt Records; Rowe Productions; Empire Records
- Members: Dean Wells; Nathan Peachey; Andrew Cameron; Nick Ross; Luke Rosten
- Website: https://teramaze.com.au/

Teramaze are an Australian progressive metal band formed in 1995 in Geelong, Victoria.

Initially known as Terrormaze, the band later changed its name to Teramaze to reflect founding member Dean Wells' evolving personal convictions and a shift toward a more complex, progressive musical direction. The band was active until 2002, taking a hiatus before being reignited by Wells in 2009.

== History ==
Teramaze was established in 1995 by guitarist and vocalist Dean Wells. That year, they released their debut album Doxology. The band’s early work had a strong thrash metal influence, which later evolved into a more progressive metal sound. After disbanding in 2002, Dean rekindled his passion for the project in 2009, leading to the release of Anhedonia in 2012. Anhedonia was co-produced by Jeff Waters of the Canadian metal band Annihilator.

Teramaze's 2015 album Her Halo is widely regarded as a standout in the progressive metal genre, marking a significant evolution in the band's sound and artistic direction. MetalReviews awarded the album a 91/100, praising its blend of technical prowess and emotional depth. The review highlights Nathan Peachey's vocal performance, comparing his natural range to that of Tommy Karevik (Kamelot/Seventh Wonder). Tracks like "An Ordinary Dream" and "Broken" are noted for their melodic strength and compelling arrangements.

Since then the band has released numerous albums including: Are We Soldiers (2019), and I Wonder (2020).

In October 2022, Teramaze released Flight of the Wounded, continuing to explore and expand their progressive metal style. They followed this with Dalla Volta in 2023, a compilation that included reimagined versions of earlier songs and new material.

In April 2024, Teramaze released Eli: A Wonderful Fall from Grace. Most recently, in October 2024, they released Teracoustic Sessions Vol 1, which features acoustic versions of some of their previous songs.

In 2024, they released the single "Bullet To A Pharaoh", accompanied by a music video.

On April 18, 2025 Teramaze released their 14th album, The Harmony Machine, which has garnered positive attention from critics and fans alike. The album showcases the band's signature blend of progressive metal with elements of pop and R&B, pushing the boundaries of their genre.

Sentinel Daily praises the album for its innovative approach, highlighting tracks like "Like A Cyborg," "Ending of All," and "Sinister" as evidence of the band's forward-thinking artistry. The review notes the unique combination of soulful vocals with heavy riffs, drawing comparisons to a hypothetical heavier version of Toto. Nathan Peachey's vocal performance, along with the contributions of guitarist Chris Zoupa, drummer Nick Ross, and bassist Andrew Cameron, are commended for their excellence.

Metal Temple awarded the album a 9/10, emphasizing the band's exceptional musicianship and the album's concise collection of songs that blend catchiness with complexity.

== Members ==
- Dean Wells – guitars, vocals
- Nathan Peachey – vocals
- Andrew Cameron – bass guitar
- Nick Ross – drums
- Luke Rosten – keyboards

Past members
- Brent Lee
- Tony Paulo
- Matt Richie
- Brett Rerekura
- Clinton Johannes
- Ira Kearney
- Adam Wilkie
- Adam Burnell
- Andrew Vickers
- Patrick Sgro
- Allan Heyne
- Julian Percy
- Matthew Dawson
- Tijon Lolis
- Miles Krenzin
- Andrew Pitman
- Neil Flavelle
- Jayson Sherlock
- John Zambelis
- Nick Walker
- Jeremy Poole-Johnson
- Jonah Weingarten
- Dean Kennedy
- Luis Eguren
- Chris Zoupa
- Jon Beckx

== Discography ==
- Doxology (1995)
- Tears to Dust (1998)
- Anhedonia (2012)
- Esoteric Symbolism (2014)
- Her Halo (2015)
- Are We Soldiers (2019)
- I Wonder (2020)
- Sorella Minore (2021)
- And the Beauty They Perceive (2021)
- Flight of the Wounded (2022)
- Dalla Volta (2023)
- Eli: A Wonderful Fall from Grace (2024)
- Teracoustic Sessions Vol 1 (2024)
- The Harmony Machine (2025)
- The Silent Architect (2026)

== Reception ==
Teramaze has received positive reviews from critics for their technical proficiency and songwriting. Several of their albums have been praised, with some noting the band's ambitious compositions and emotional depth. Their live performances have also earned them accolades, with notable shows such as their headlining appearance at the ProgPower Europe festival and support for Avatar.

Their live performances have also been well-received.
