= Arno Menses =

- Born: 15 May; Rotterdam, Zuid-Holland, Netherlands
- Genres: AOR; progressive rock; progressive metal
- Occupations: singer, musician, songwriter
- Instruments: vocals, drums, bass, keyboards
- Years active: 2003–present
- Labels: Gentle Art of Music, ZYX, Inside Out

Arno Menses is a Dutch musician, known for being lead vocalist for the progressive rock bands Sieges Even and Subsignal.

== Career ==
=== Bonebag ===
In the early stages of his career, Menses was a drummer also providing backing vocals for the band Bonebag. The band released their debut album "Noli me Tangere" in 2007, with contributions from Menses on drums and backing vocals on all tracks on the album. The group broke up shortly after their debut tour.

=== Sieges Even ===
Menses joined Sieges Even during their hiatus in 2003. His time with the band saw the release of albums such as The Art of Navigating by the Stars, which marked a shift in the band's sound, with longer compositions and a more melodic approach.

Collaboration with the band continued with the release of Paramount in 2007, followed by a live album Playgrounds in 2008. After a tour as the opening act for Journey, the band broke up due to internal conflicts.

=== Subsignal ===
In 2007, Menses and Sieges Even guitarist Markus Steffen founded the band Subsignal. Since its founding, the band has released several albums and achieved success in the German charts with albums such as Touchstones (2011), Paraiso (2013) and La Muerta (2018). It was announced on the band's website that Arno left the band in 2025.

== Sieges Even releases ==
- The Art of Navigating by the Stars (2005)
- Paramount (2007)
- Playgrounds (2008)

== Subsignal releases ==
- Beautiful & Monstrous (2009)
- Touchstones (2011)
- Paraiso (2013)
- Out the must be something, live in Mannheim (DVD/2013)
- The Beacons of Somewhere, Sometime (2015)
- La Muerta (2018)
- A Canopy of Stars (The Best of 2009–2015)
- A Song for the Homeless-Live in Rüsselsheim (2019)
- A Poetry of Rain (2023)

== Other musical appearances ==
Menses has collaborated with other artists in various capacities and contributed to the following projects:

- Android Soul – Disappointing Paradise (2008)
- Roel van Helden – RvH (2009)
- Another Perfect Day – The Gothenburg Post Scriptum (2010)
- Soul Secret – Closer To Daylight (2011)
- Extrovert – Ascension (2011)
- Dreamscape – Everlight (2012)
- Seven Steps to the Green Door – Fetish (2015)
- Blind Ego – Liquid (2016)
- Entering Polaris (2018)
- PreHistoric Animals – The Magical Mystery Machine (2020)
- Kalle Wallner – Voices (2022)
- Project: Patchwork – Ultima Ratio (2022)
- Marek Arnold's Art Rock Project (2023)
- Entering Polaris – Atlantean Shores (2023)
- Lind – The Justification of Reality Part II (2023)
- HERC – Melian (2023)
