= Revoiced =

Compilation album by Dreamscape
- Released: November 18, 2005
- Genre: Progressive metal
- Length: 64:47
- Label: Massacre Records

Dreamscape chronology
End of Silence (2004)	Revoiced (2005)	5th Season (2007)

Revoiced is a compilation album by the German progressive metal band Dreamscape. It is a compilation of songs re-recorded from their first two albums with their line-up at the time.

== Track listing ==
1. "Thorn in My Mind" – 5:28
2. "Fateful Silence" – 4:43
3. "Alone" – 4:36
4. "She's Flying" – 5:14
5. "Changes" – 5:21
6. "Fearing the Daylight" – 5:08
7. "Unvoiced (Lost Parts)" – 8:44
8. "Reborn" – 4:26
9. "Face Your Fears" – 5:31
10. "Winter Dreams" – 5:54
11. "Loneliness" – 4:48
12. "When Shadows are Gone" – 4:54

== Line-up ==
- Roland Stoll - vocals
- Wolfgang Kerinnis - guitars
- Jan Vacik - keyboards
- Benno Schmidtler - bass
- Klaus Engl - drums
