= The Art of Navigating by the Stars =

Studio album by Sieges Even
- Released: 2005
- Genre: Progressive metal
- Length: 63:35
- Label: InsideOut Music

Sieges Even chronology
Uneven (1997)	The Art of Navigating by the Stars (2005)	Paramount (2007)

The Art of Navigating by the Stars is the sixth studio album by the progressive metal band Sieges Even. It is the first album to feature the vocalist Arno Menses.

== Reception ==
Professional ratings
Review scores
Source	Rating
Sea of Tranquility	4.5/5 stars

The album was described by Sea of Tranquility webzine as being "one of the most anticipated comeback albums of the year" and stylistically compared to Fates Warning's A Pleasant Shade of Gray in that "it is a long-form composition divided into eight movements, plus a short intro track. These movements, or sequences as they are named in the booklet, are all parts of a huge 63-minute song, linked through various key themes and motifs."

== Track listing ==
1. "Navigating by the Stars" − 0:29
2. "The Weight" − 10:14
3. "The Lonely Views of Condors" − 6:14
4. "Unbreakable" − 9:00
5. "Stigmata" − 8:22
6. "Blue Wide Open" − 5:13
7. "To the Ones Who Have Failed" − 7:26
8. "Lighthouse" − 7:42
9. "Styx" − 8:55
