= Everlight Electronics =

Taiwanese LED manufacturer

Everlight Electronics Co., Ltd.
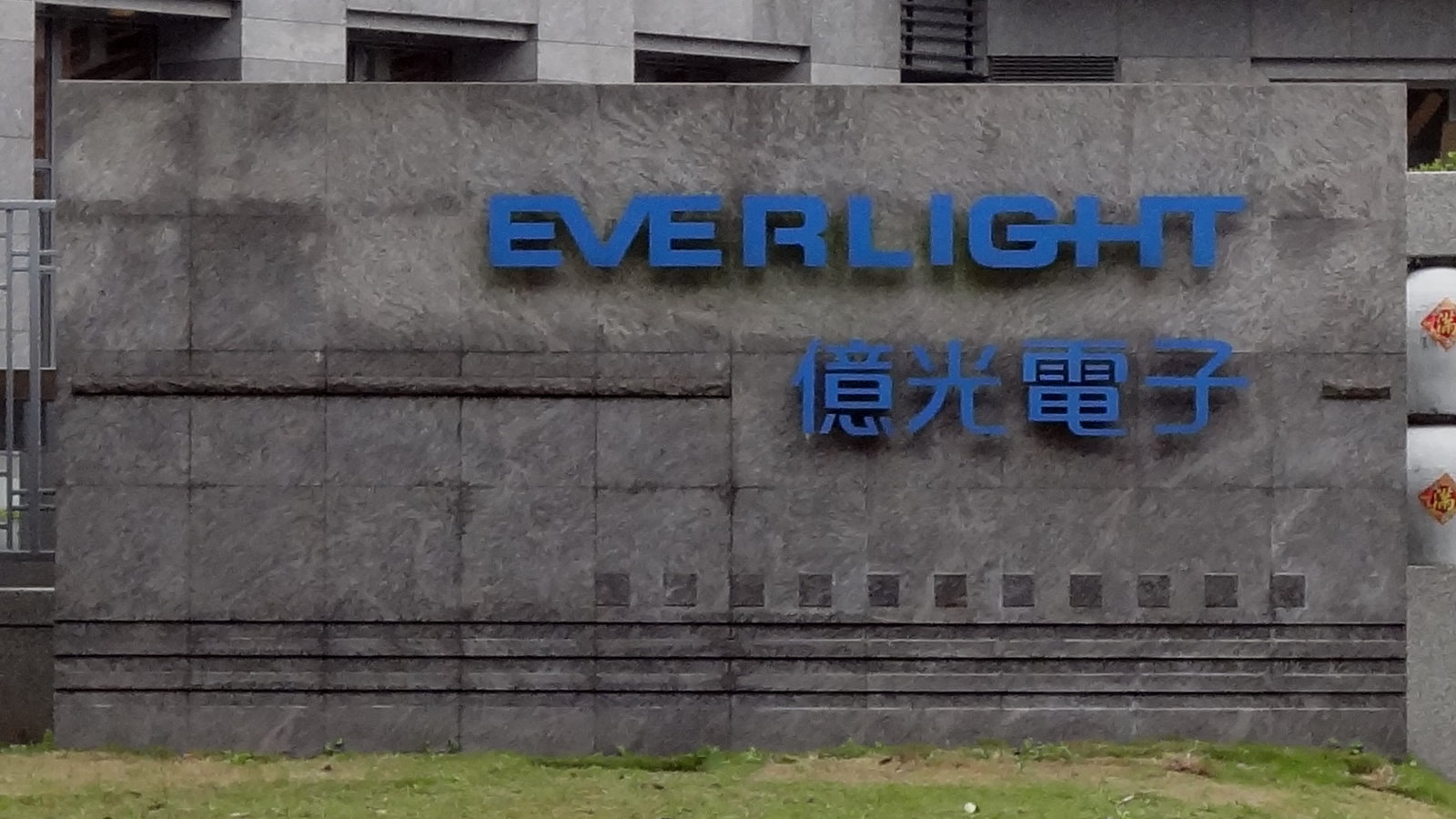
- Industry: Electronics
- Founded: 1983
- Founder: Robert Yeh
- Headquarters: Shulin, New Taipei, Taiwan
- Key people: Robert Yeh (Chair)
- Products: light-emitting diodes
- Revenue: NT$11.32 billion (2008)
- Number of employees: 5,600
- Website: www.everlight.com

Everlight Electronics Co., Ltd. is a Taiwanese company which manufactures light-emitting diodes (LEDs). It is the world's fifth largest LED package manufacturer.

== History ==
Everlight Electronics former logo

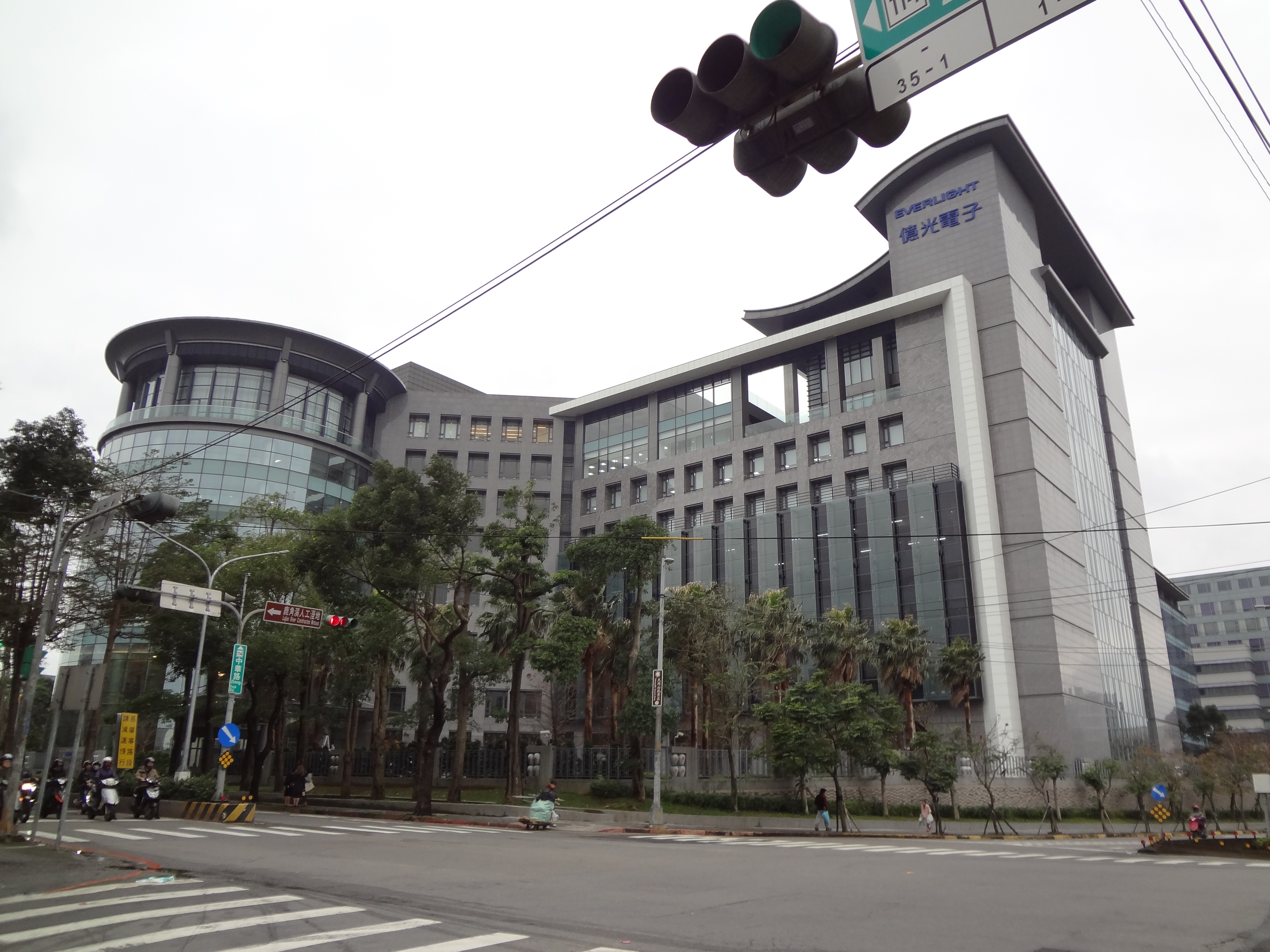
Everlight Electronics global operations headquarters

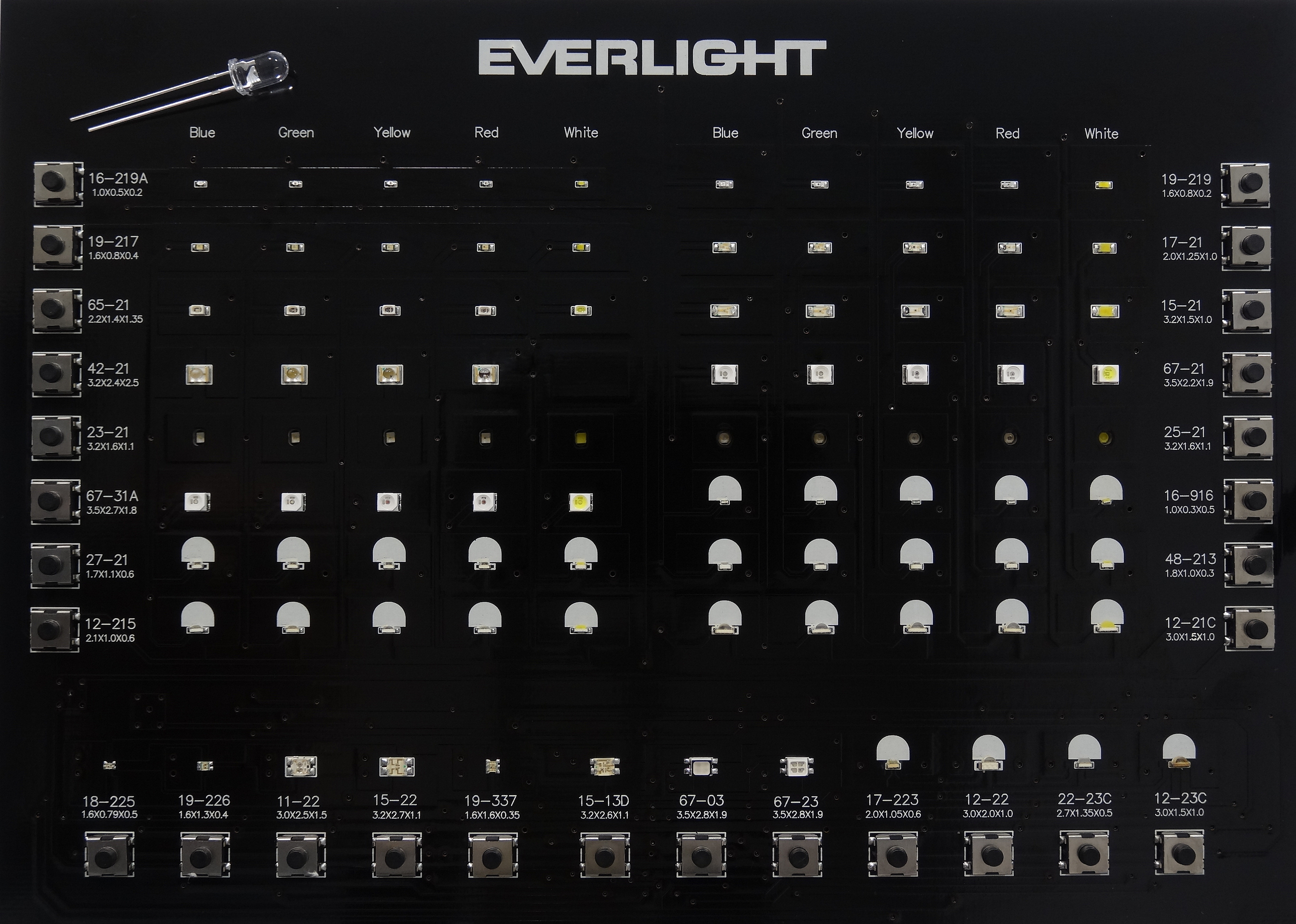
Image of miniature surface mount LEDs in most common sizes made by Everlight.

Everlight Electronics was founded in 1983 by Robert Yeh.

Initially, Everlight produced indicator lights for home appliances.

By 2006, Everlight was Taiwan's largest manufacturer of light-emitting diodes (LEDs), producing 1.850 billion units every month, and employing 4,000 people.

In 2007, 40% of Everlight's revenue was derived from LEDs used for backlighting of mobile phones, and it also began to expand into backlight LEDs for laptop computers and televisions.

In 2018, Everlight began introducing high-efficiency agricultural lighting products to augment livestock and horticultural plant stock growth.

In 2019, Everlight's newly formed optoelectronic R&D team introduced tunable LEDs to maximize animal husbandry and aquaculture. For instance in poultry farming, exposing a chicken to white light takes 172 days to reach reproductive maturity, while exposing to red light reduces to 168 days, but blue light increases maturity to 182 days. Green light exposure makes poultry gain weight faster, due to growth hormone receptor stimulation and enhancement of satellite glial cells which promote muscle development.

The R&D team also introduced UV LEDs for eggshell surface sanitization and water disinfection for waste water runoff. In collaboration with Dr. Kun-Hsien Tsai, Professor at College of Public Health at National Taiwan University, a novel ovitrap was introduced which pulses Ultraviolet C to regularly destroy collected mosquito eggs.

In 2020, Everlight collaborated with Professor Wang Yong-song's team of the Institute of Fisheries Science, National Taiwan University to develop a special LED lamp for grouper fish aquaculture, where specific wavelength exposure reduces cannibalization and loss of fingerlings by over 40%.

In 2021, Everlight released new horticultural LEDs in spectrums tailored to augment the red pigment of strawberries. Strawberries rely on sunlight to produce their red color through a process called anthocyanin biosynthesis, but in areas with little sunlight horticultural LEDs can be used to catalyze this biochemical process instead.

== See also ==
- List of companies of Taiwan
