= Platitude (band) =

Swedish band

- Origin: Sweden
- Genres: Progressive metal, power metal
- Years active: 1995-2008
- Label: Scarlet
- Past members: Erik "EZ" Blomkvist; Gustav Köllerström; Kristofer von Wachenfeldt; Patrik Janson; Erik Wigelius

Platitude was a Swedish progressive power metal band formed in 1995, however a permanent line-up was not established until 1997. After three demos, they signed a deal with the Italian label Scarlet Records in the spring of 2002. They released three albums before disbanding in 2008.

In late October 2005, new deals were signed with the German Metal Heaven and Japanese King Records for distribution in Europe and Japan respectively.

In May 2003, Platitude joined the Danish heavy metal band Manticora on a European tour and later the same year supported the British progressive metal band Threshold. They have played gigs all over Europe including opening for Finnish power metal band Sonata Arctica in 2004 at a show in Copenhagen.

Since their dissolution in 2008, several band members have been involved in other projects.

== Members ==
=== Last line-up ===
- Erik "EZ" Blomkvist (Seven Thorns, Dreamscape) - vocals, bass
- Gustav Köllerström - guitars
- Kristofer von Wachenfeldt (Care of Night) - keyboards
- Patrik Janson - bass
- Erik Wigelius - drums

=== Former members ===
- Daniel Hall (Rob Rock) - guitars
- Johan Randén - stand-in guitars
- Tommie Lundgren - keyboards
- Andreas Lindahl (ZooL) - keyboards
- Marcus Höher - drums
- Andreas Brobjer (Space Odyssey) - drums

== Discography ==
=== Studio albums ===
- Secrets of Life (2002)
- Nine (2004)
- Silence Speaks (2006)

=== Demos ===
- Wings of Time (2001)
