= Poverty's No Crime =

German progressive metal band

- Origin: Germany
- Genres: Progressive metal
- Years active: 1991 – present
- Labels: Noise Records (former); InsideOut Music
- Members: Volker Walsemann; Marco Ahrens; Andreas Tegeler; Joerg Springub; Heiko Spaarmaan
- Past members: Christian Scheele; Marcello Maniscalco
- Website: www.povertys-no-crime.de

Poverty's No Crime is a German progressive metal band founded in 1991 by Volker Walsemann, Marco Ahrens, Andreas Tegeler, Christian Scheele, and Marcello Maniscalco. Their first two albums, Symbiosis and The Autumn Years were released under their old record company, Noise Records. Their subsequent albums were released under the InsideOut record company. Their albums have received positive attention from the German magazine, Rock Hard.

== Discography ==
Year	Title	Type	Record
1995	Symbiosis	Studio	Noise Records
1996	The Autumn Years	Studio	Noise Records
1999	Slave to the Mind	Studio	InsideOut
2001	One in a Million	Studio	InsideOut
2003	The Chemical Chaos	Studio	InsideOut
2007	Save My Soul	Studio	InsideOut
2016	Spiral of Fear	Studio	Metalville
2021	A Secret to Hide	Studio	Metalville
