= Atrox =

Norwegian metal band

- Origin: Trondheim, Norway
- Genres: Avant-garde metal Progressive metal Gothic metal
- Years active: 1988–present
- Label: Season of Mist

Atrox is a Norwegian avant-garde metal band from Trondheim. The group originally formed under the name "Suffocation" but soon changed it because of numerous other bands with the same name. Formed in 1988, the band released its first material only in 1997, and followed it with two releases on notable French metal label, Season of Mist. While their early releases are firmly rooted in death metal, later releases incorporate more progressive elements. In 2024, their album Contentum was named one of the 10 "wackiest" progressive metal albums ever by Loudwire.

== Members ==
=== Current ===
-viNd- - guitars
Rune Sørgård - guitars, programming
Tor Arne Helgesen - drums
Erik Paulsen - bass
Rune Folgerø - lead vocals
Per Spjøtvold - keyboard, backing vocals

=== Former ===
Ole Marius Larmerud - guitars (2002–2005)
Monika Edvardsen - vocals, keyboard (1996–2004)
Pete Beck - vocals, bass (2002–2004)
Daniel Stavsøyen - bass (2001–2002)
Tom Wahl - bass (1999)
Dag Rune Øyan - guitars (1995–1999)
Lars Halvard Søndrol - drums (1994–1999)
Tommy Sebastian Halseth - bass (1995–1999)
Geir Tore Johansen - vocals (1988–1997)
Svenn Tore Mauseth bass (1988–1995)
Tor-Helge Skei - guitars (1988–1994)
Tomas Smagersjø - drums (1993)
Geir Knarrbakk - drums (1988–1992)
Gunder Audun Dragsten - guitars (1988–1990)

== Discography ==
- 1997 Mesmerised (Head Not Found Records)
- 2000 Contentum (Season of Mist)
- 2002 Terrestrials (Season of Mist)
- 2003 Orgasm (Code 666)
- 2008 Binocular (Season of Mist)
- 2017 Monocle
