= Lost in Thought =

Welsh musical group

Lost In Thought
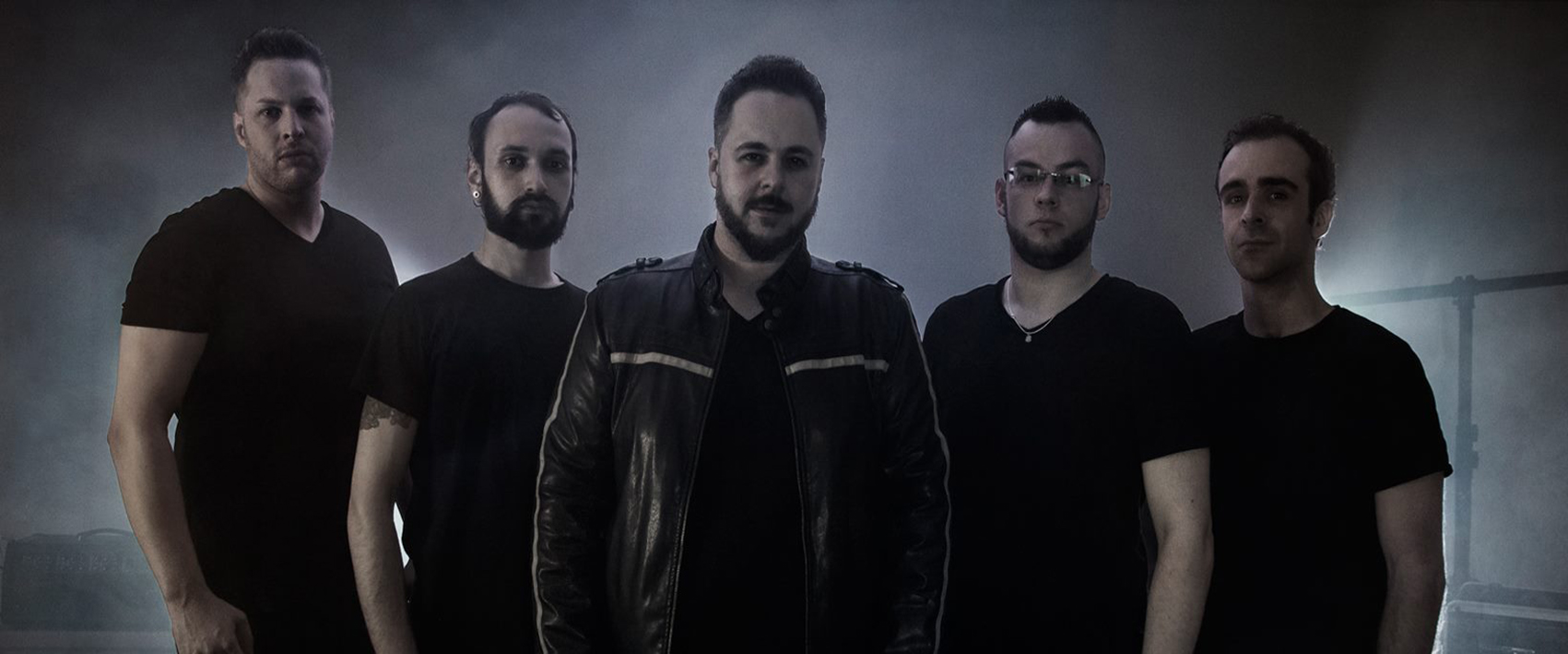

Background information
- Origin: Swansea, United Kingdom
- Genres: Progressive metal; power metal; symphonic metal
- Years active: 2007–Current
- Labels: Inner Wound Records
- Members: Dean Lazenby; David Grey; Niall Temple; Josh Heard
- Website: Official website

Lost in Thought is a five-piece progressive metal band from Wales (UK). The band formed in Swansea in late 2007.

To date the band have recorded their debut album 'Opus Arise' which has been released through Inner Wound Records. The band announced in April 2013 that their 2nd album has been abandoned and Lost In Thought had come to an end announcing that the band "was pretty much torn into two halves."

In January 2016 the band announced that they had reformed and that a second album was in the works; this was released in 2018, under the title Renascence

== History ==
Lost In Thought formed in late 2007 when David Grey and Simon Pike embarked on a quest to find other musicians to compose and perform progressive tinged music with and found Greg Baker and Chris Billingham. After completing their line-up with vocalist Nate Loosemore, the band recorded a demo EP early 2010 which secured them a management deal with Intromental Worldwide. After a few months in the studio recording 'Opus Arise' the band's management secured them a record deal with Inner Wound Records in Sweden.

Nate Loosemore and David Grey reformed Lost In Thought in January 2016 and began working on their next album. 2016 saw the return of founding member and drummer Chris Billingham. He returned to the band after a recovery following a road traffic collision in 2011. In November 2016 Lost In Thought announced the departure of Nate Loosemore and introduced Deane Lazenby as the new lead singer. In June 2017 Diego Zapatero (keyboards) joined the band.

== Band members ==
Current members

- Dean Lazenby – lead vocals (2016–present)
- David Grey – guitar, backing vocals (2007–present)
- Niall Temple – keyboards (2017–present)
- Josh Heard – bass guitar (2016–present)
- TBA – drums (2007–2011, 2016–present)

Former members

- Dean Lazenby - lead vocals (later returned)
- Nate Loosemore – lead vocals
- Greg Baker – keyboards, vocals
- Simon Pike – bass
- Rory O'Hare – drums
- Bradley Ratcliffe – drums

== Discography ==
- Opus Arise (2011)
- Renascence (2018)
- Coming Home (2020)
