= Everlight (album) =

Studio album by Dreamscape
- Released: April 13, 2012
- Genre: Progressive metal
- Length: 62:23
- Label: Silverwolf Productions

Dreamscape chronology
5th Season (2007)	Everlight (2012)

Everlight is the fifth studio album by German progressive metal band Dreamscape.

== Track listing ==
1. "Final Dawn" – 2:21
2. "Restless" – 5:41
3. "Led Astray" – 5:09
4. "Fortune and Fame" – 4:03
5. "The Violet Flame Forever" – 5:31
6. "A Matter of Time Transforming" – 10:37
7. "One" – 4:06
8. "The Calm Before The Storm" – 5:25
9. "Refugium in Db-Major" – 1:16
10. "A Mental Journey" – 5:29
11. "Breathing Spaces" – 5:31
12. "Everlight" – 7:14

== Personnel ==
Dreamscape

- Francesco Marino – lead vocals
- David Bertok – keyboards
- Wolfgang Kerinnis – Guitar
- Danilo Batdorf – drums
- Ralf Schwager – bass

Guest Vocalists

- Arno Menses
- Erik Blomkvist
- Herbie Langhans
- Dilenya Mar
- Mike DiMeo
- Nando Fernandez
- Oliver Hartmann
- Roland Stoll
