= Wolverine (band) =

Swedish progressive metal band

Wolverine is a Swedish progressive metal band, that was formed in 1995 by Stefan Zell and Marcus Losbjer.

== Career ==
=== Early releases ===
Wolverine started out playing death metal with melodic influences, but when they released their first EP, Fervent Dream, in November 1999, the music had evolved into progressive metal. Fervent Dream got an overwhelming reception all over the world and was soon sold out. The band also played outside Sweden for the first time in connection with the release of the album.

The beginning of 2001 saw Fervent Dream re-released as a digi-pack, re-mastered, and with two bonus tracks. During the summer of that same year, the band traveled to Germany and recorded the follow-up to Fervent Dream – The Window Purpose.

The Window Purpose was released in December and the response was once again overwhelming; the album saw the band gain the accolade of Album of the Month during January 2002 from the Netherlands' metal magazine Aardschok. Once again Wolverine played around Europe to promote the album.

=== Elitist Records recordings ===
In 2003, the moody album Cold Light of Monday was released through Elitist Records. The album explored the darker side of the band. The album was well received in many of the biggest metal magazines, such as Kerrang and Metal Hammer. During 2003, Wolverine also opened up for Anathema in London.

The band re-released The Window Purpose in the beginning of 2005, re-mastered and with renewed artwork as well as a new recording of an old track from Fervent Dream. Later that same year, Wolverine played the European edition of the ProgPower festival for the third time in their career. The band co-headlined the festival's second day together with Pain of Salvation.

=== Joins Candlelight ===
After splitting with Elitist/Earache Records in 2005, the band found a new home in Candlelight Records and the time has now come to release Still, Wolverine's fourth studio album. Recorded at the Spacelab Studio, Germany during the summer of 2005, the album holds nine tracks featuring Wolverine's unique sound. The music is probably best described as a mixture between The Window Purpose and Cold Light of Monday.

=== Communication Lost ===
The recording of the album took place on various locations around Sweden during the first half of 2010, and it was mixed by Jacob Hansen at Hansen Studios in Denmark. The album was mastered by Eroc and released on May 23, 2011. According to Marcus Losbjer, the songs on the album are more musically complex than before. To help create the desired atmosphere, electronic elements and effects were also utilised. He also states he feels it is the natural evolution and continuation from Still. Vocalist Stefan Zell has also noted that Communication Lost is the band's best production.

== Band members ==
=== Current members ===
- Stefan Zell – clean vocals
- Jonas Jonsson – electric guitar, acoustic guitar, solos
- Thomas Jansson – bass guitar
- Marcus Losbjer – drums and death vocals, percussion
- Per Henriksson – keyboard, effects, keyboard solo

Stefan Zell also performed bass on Wolverine's first two albums.

=== Former members ===
- Mikael Zell – electric guitar
- C-H Landegren – electric guitar and backing vocals
- Per Broddesson – electric guitar
- Andreas Baglien – keyboards

== Discography ==
=== Albums ===
- 2001: The Window Purpose (re-released in 2005)
- 2003: Cold Light of Monday
- 2006: Still
- 2011: Communication Lost
- 2016: Machina Viva
- 2026: Anomalies

=== EPs ===
- 1999: Fervent Dream (re-issued in 2001)
- 2021: A Darkened Sun
