= Baarlo =

Baarlo Baolder
- Village
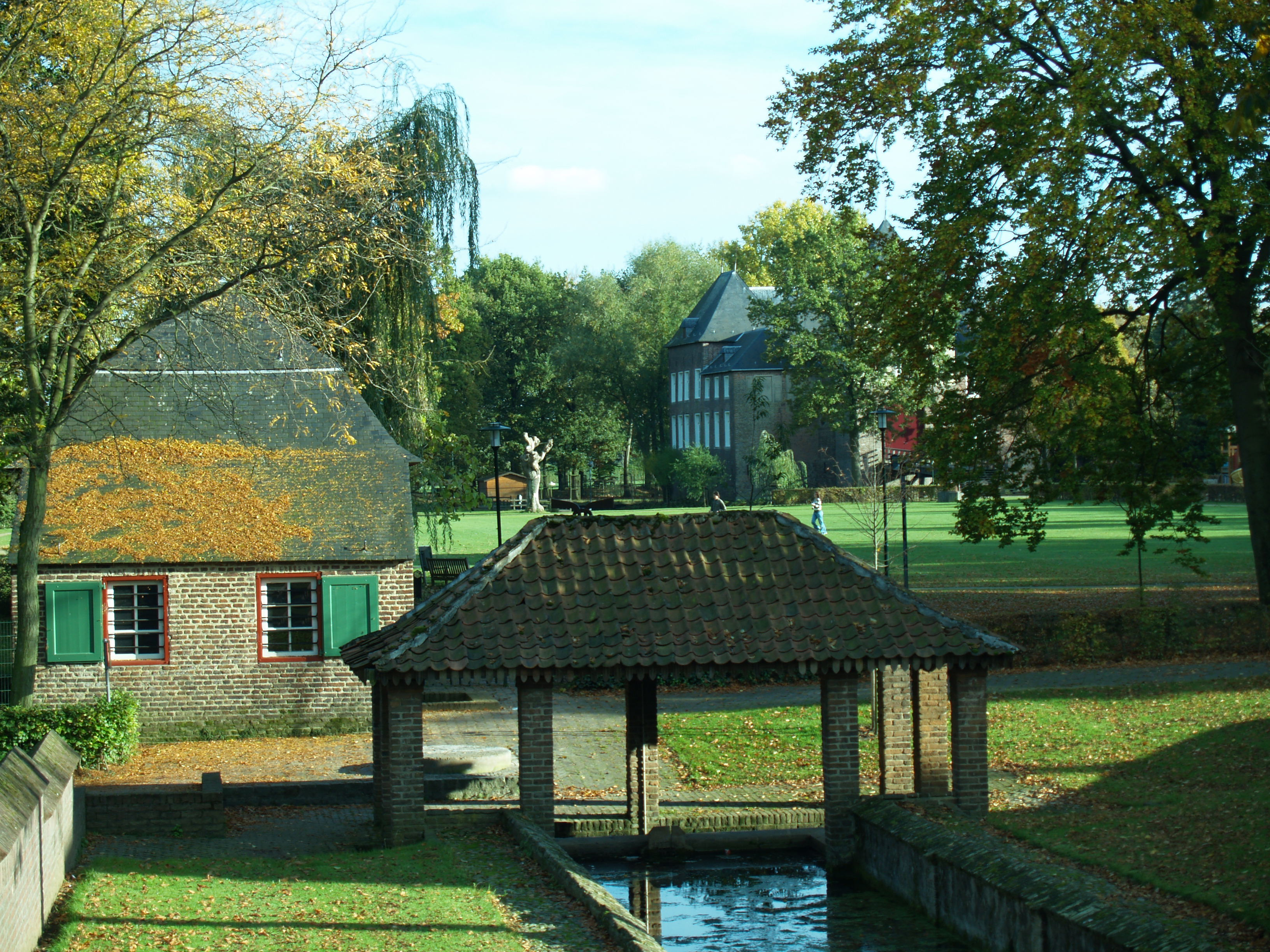
- Water mill and Castle d'Erp

- Location in the Netherlands Location in the province of Limburg in the Netherlands
- Coordinates: 51°19′39″N 6°5′39″E
- Country: Netherlands
- Province: Limburg
- Municipality: Peel en Maas

Area
  - Total: 17.58 km^{2} (6.79 sq mi)
- Elevation: 20 m (66 ft)

Population (2023)
  - Total: 6,525
  - Density: 371.2/km^{2} (961.3/sq mi)
- Time zone: UTC+1 (CET)
  - Summer (DST): UTC+2 (CEST)
- Postal code: 5991
- Dialing code: 077

Baarlo (Dutch: [ˈbaːrloː]; Limburgish: Baolder [ˈbɔːldəʀ]) is a village in southeastern Netherlands. It is located in the municipality of Peel en Maas, Limburg, about 6 km southwest of Venlo.

== Name and symbols ==
The oldest mention of the name Baarlo is from 1219.

The oldest certificate of the bank of Baarlo dates from 25 January 1377. In 1629 for the first time it used its own seal. The seal shows Saint Peter holding a key in his left hand and in his right hand three ropes carrying a shield, on which a stag is shown jumping to the left. At that time, the local lord, schout or pastor sealed the certificates.

== History ==
Archeological excavations have shown that at the beginning of our calendar people already had settled in Baarlo. Later the Romans came; they built the Roman road between Tongeren and Nijmegen and Oyen (between Baarlo and Kessel).

In the 19th century, the old church of Baarlo became too small, so the city decided to build a new one. Pierre Cuypers was the architect and the church was finished in 1878.

In 1932, the priest chancel and the transept of the church were extended by Joseph Franssen. In November 1944 the church was blown up by the Germans. A restoration was not possible. Therefore, it was decided to build a new church. This work was completed in 1955.

== Castles ==
There are four castles in Baarlo. Castles d'Erp (has also been called de Borcht), Berckt, and Raay were built in the 13th century. Castle Scheres was built about 1860 and was inhabited by the American artist Shinkichi Tajiri until he died on 15 March 2009.

== Gallery ==
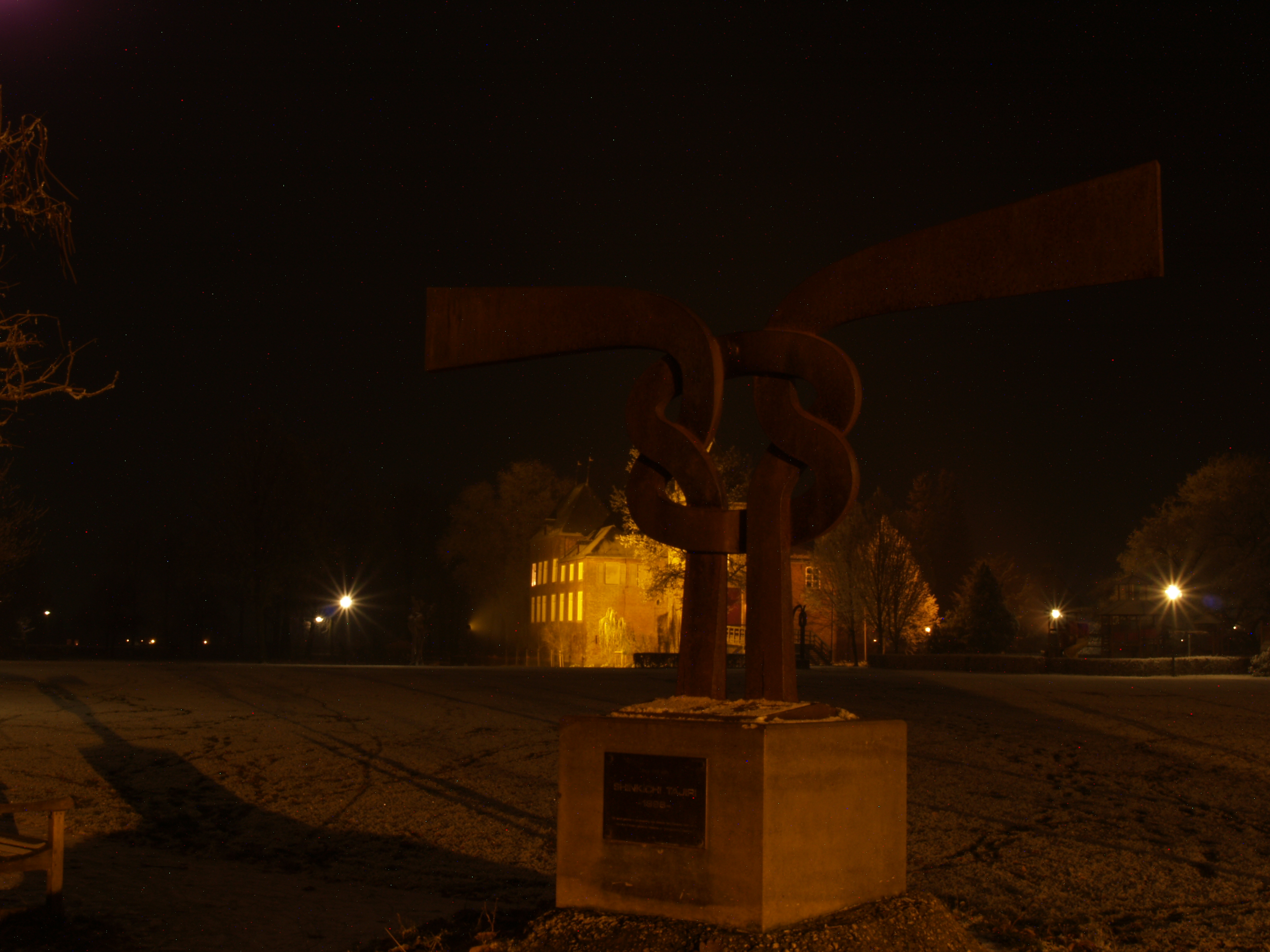
Artefact of Tajiri in Baarlo. Behind Castle d'Erp.

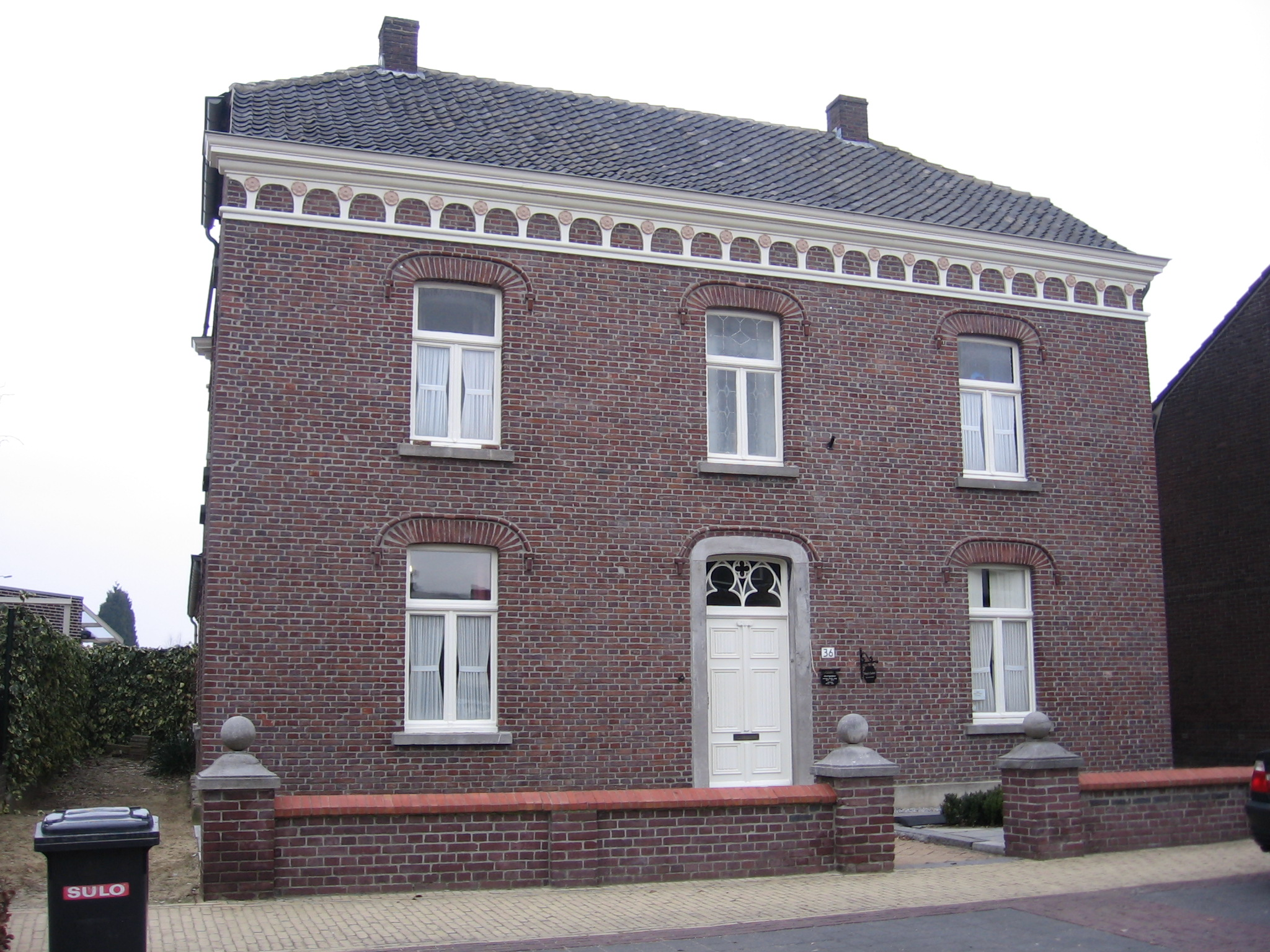
House in Baarlo

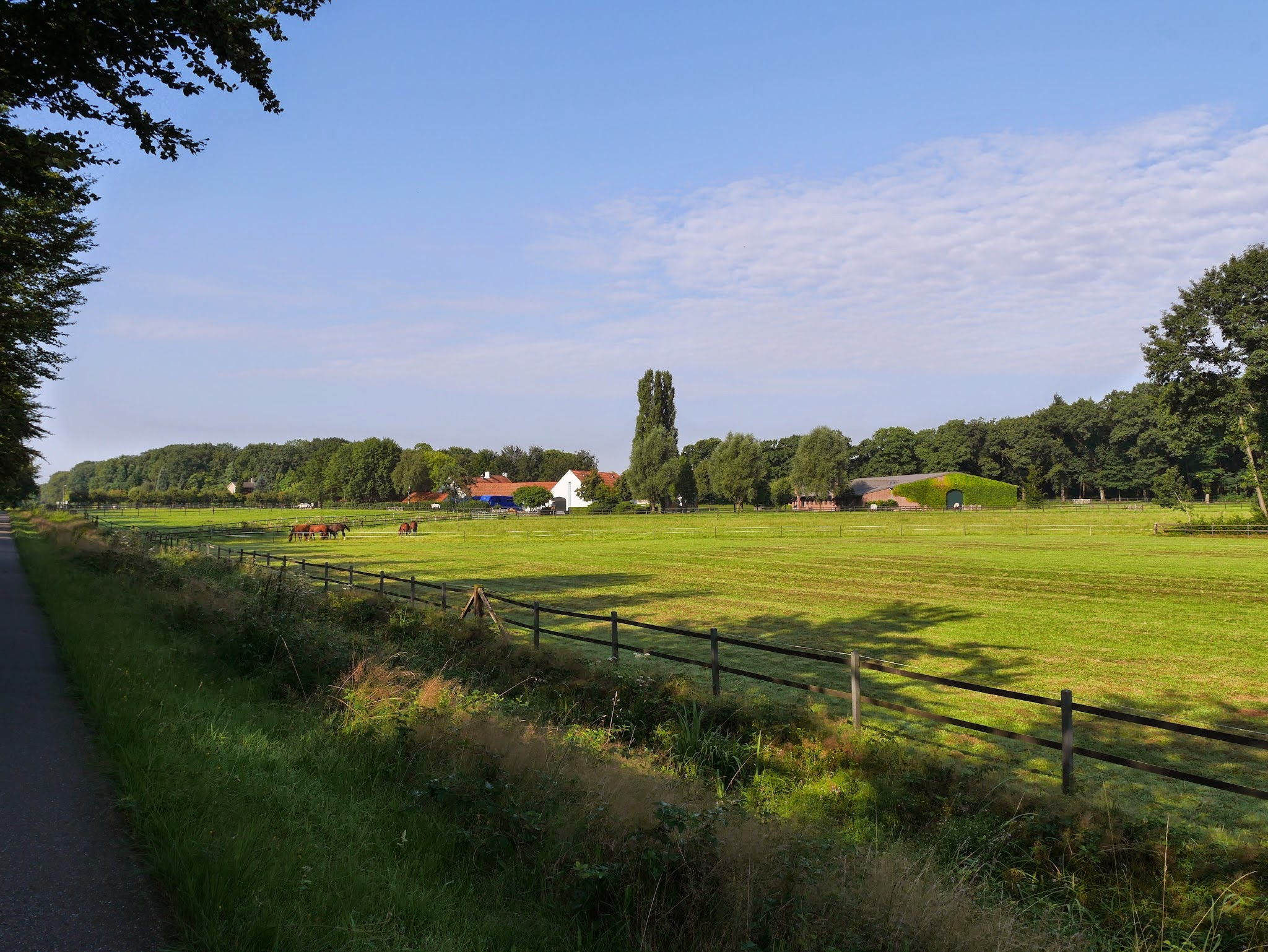
View on Baarlo

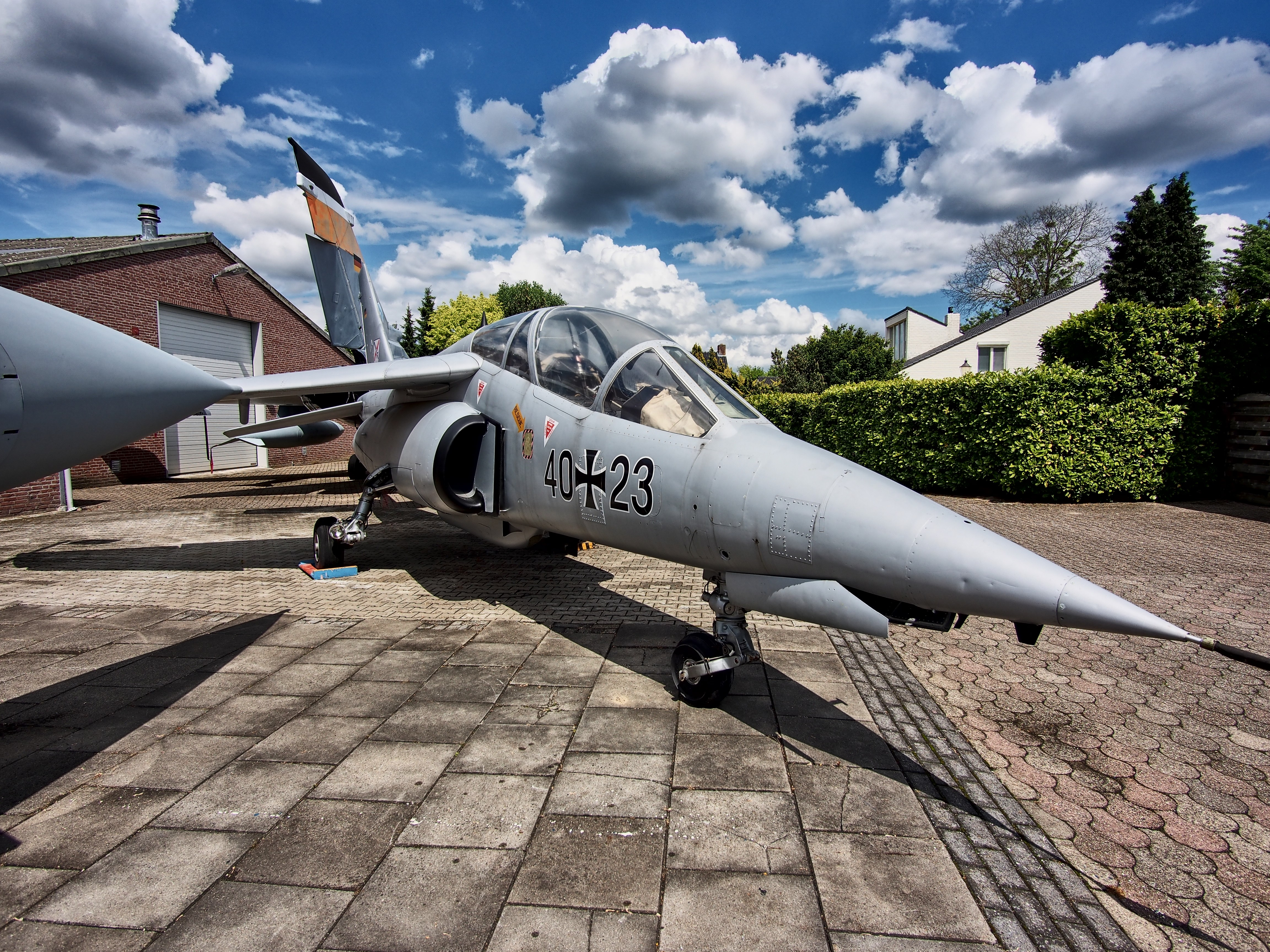
Alphajet at the Piet Smits Museum
