= Subsignal =

German progressive rock band

- Origin: Munich, Germany
- Genres: Progressive metal, progressive rock
- Years active: 2007–present
- Label: Gentle Art of Music
- Spinoff of: Sieges Even
- Members: Arno Menses; Markus Steffen; Dirk Brand; Markus Maichel; Martijn Horsten
- Past members: Danilo Batdorf; David Bertok; Roel van Helden; Ralf Schwager
- Website: subsignalband.com

Subsignal is a German progressive rock band. The band was originally formed as a side project by Sieges Even members Arno Menses (vocals) and Markus Steffen (guitars). After their main band disbanded, Menses and Steffen recruited former Dreamscape members Ralf Schwager (bass), and David Bertok (keyboards). Sun Caged drummer Roel van Helden was Subsignal's first drummer, but was replaced in 2012 by Dreamscape drummer Danilo Batdorf.

Subsignal describes its music as "progressive, melancholic, cutting edge, emotional, blended with a good portion of melodic heaviness."

== Discography ==
=== Albums ===
- Beautiful & Monstrous (2009)
- Touchstones (2011)
- Out There Must Be Something (2012, Live DVD)
- Paraíso (2013)
- The Beacons of Somewhere Sometime (2015)
- La Muerta (2018)
- A Song For The Homeless - Live in Rüsselsheim 2019 (2020)
- A Poetry Of Rain (2023)
