= Galileo Records =

Galileo Records (GmbH)
- Parent company: Independent
- Founded: 1998
- Founder: Patrick Becker
- Distributor(s): CDBaby, Online music store (iTunes, Amazon.com, Zune Marketplace, etc.)
- Genre: Progressive rock, Progressive metal
- Country of origin: Switzerland
- Location: Bettlach, Switzerland
- Official website: Galileo-Records.com

Galileo Records is a GmbH Switzerland-based record label that publishes progressive rock and metal albums. The label was formed in 1998 by Konny Eisenring, and Patrick Becker. Konny left Galileo after two years.

== Background ==
Konny Eisenring and Patrick Becker got the idea of starting a label after seeing the band Xang perform in a French festival. The two contacted the band, who said they did not have a label. Eisenring and Becker decided to sign the band, and Xang's Destiny of a Dream became Galileo Record's first album. After Galileo's second artist, Metaphor, was signed, Eisenring left the company. Becker then took full control over the company. In 2005, Galileo Records was established as an LLC and a GmbH is the Swiss register.

== List of bands signed by Galileo Records ==
- Xang (signed 1999)
- Metaphor (signed 2000)
- Forgotten Suns (signed 2000)
- Scythe (signed 2001)
- Thonk (signed 2001)
- T (signed 2002)
- Simon Says (signed 2002)
- Moongarden (signed 2003)
- Believe (signed 2006)
- Ex-Vagus (signed 2006)
- Heart of the Sun (signed 2007)
- Prisma (signed 2007)
- Daedalus (signed 2009)
- Metamorphosis (signed 2009)
- Jolly (signed 2009)
- This Misery Garden (signed 2009)
- Framepictures (signed 2010)
- Sky Architect (signed 2010)
- Atto IV (signed 2010)
- Gran Torino (signed 2010)
- My Name is Janet (signed 2011)
- Soul Secret (signed 2011)
- W.O.F (signed 2012)
- Cristiano Roversi (signed 2012)
- The Green Violinist (signed 2012)
- Zenit (signed 2012)
- Clepsydra (signed 2013)
