= Sky Architect =

Dutch progressive rock band

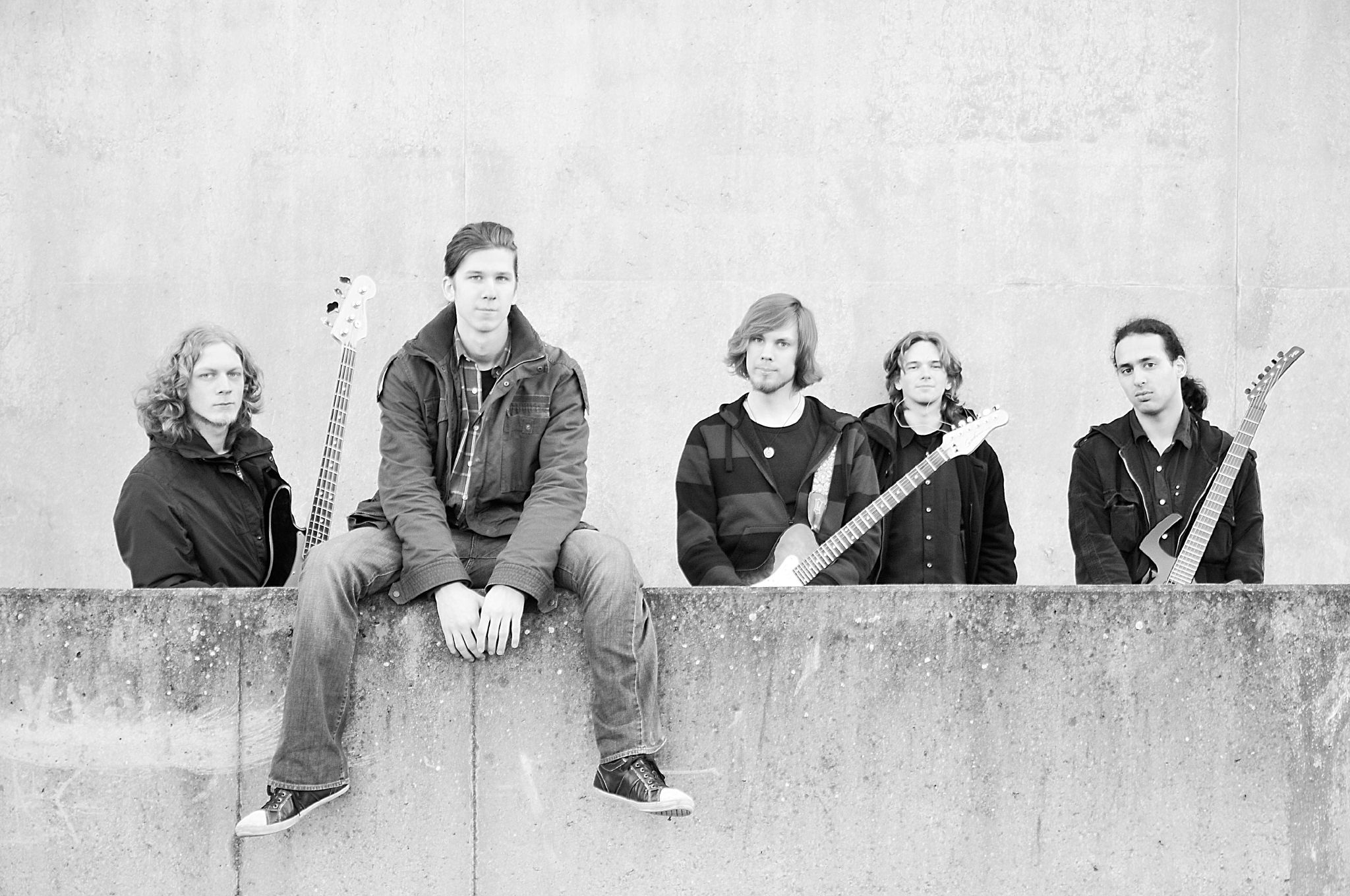
- Sky Architect in 2009 (from left to right): Guus Van Mierlo, Christiaan Bruin, Wabe Wieringa, Rik Van Honk, Tom Luchies.

Background information
- Origin: Rotterdam, Netherlands
- Genres: Progressive rock, progressive metal, jazz fusion
- Years active: 2006–present
- Labels: US: ProgRock; EU: Galileo, GmbH
- Members: Wabe Wieringa; Rik van Honk; Christiaan Bruin; Tom Luchies; Guus van Mierlo
- Website: www.Sky Architect.com

Sky Architect is a progressive rock band based in Rotterdam, Netherlands. Their debut album, Excavations of the Mind, was released in 2010 from ProgRock Records. The drummer and backing vocalist, Christiaan Bruin, is also known for his solo project "Chris". They are currently signed to FREIA Music.

== Biography ==
Sky Architect was formed in 2006 by three young men studying at a pop academy in Rotterdam, Netherlands: Wabe Wieringa (guitar), Rik van Honk (keyboards) and Christiaan Bruin (drums). These three men laid the foundation of Sky Architect, forming an instrumental power trio of sorts. While studying, the three met Tom Luchies (vocals and guitar) and Guus van Mierlo (bass guitar), who completed the final Sky Architect lineup. Through the years, the band wrote and recorded their debut album, released in 2010. The album got generally good reviews from multiple notable reviewing sources, including BlogCritics. In a post on their official website, the band announced a new album called A Dying Man's Hymn. This album was released on June 6, 2011. The band's latest album, Nomad, was released June 16, 2017.

== Style ==
Although Sky Architect fits nicely into the genre of progressive rock, they can be characterized by many of the genre's subgenres. The debut album shows influence of 70's progressive rock outfits, such as symphonic rock bands Yes and Gentle Giant, and proto-progressive metal band King Crimson (along with other modern-revival prog bands such as The Flower Kings). Away from 70's influence, the band also showcases influence from modern progressive metal bands such as Dream Theater, Pain of Salvation, Opeth, and with psychedelic rock band Porcupine Tree. There is also quite a bit of Jazz fusion appearing on the album, especially on the Deep Chasm suite.

== Discography ==
- Excavations of the Mind (2010)
- A Dying Man's Hymn (2011)
- A Billion Years of Solitude (2013)
- Nomad (2017)

== Personnel ==
- Wabe Wieringa – guitar, producing
- Rik van Honk – synthesizer, piano, mellotron, Hammond organ, backing vocals
- Christiaan Bruin – drums, backing vocals
- Tom Luchies – guitar, lead vocals, backing vocals
- Guus van Mierlo – bass guitar
