= Sieges Even =

German progressive metal band

- Origin: Munich, Germany
- Genres: Progressive metal; thrash metal (early)
- Years active: 1982–1997, 1999–2008
- Label: InsideOut
- Members: Arno Menses; Markus Steffen; Alex Holzwarth; Oliver Holzwarth
- Past members: Franz Herde; Jogi Kaiser; Wolfgang Zenk; Greg Keller; Börk Keller; Markus Burchert; Andre Matos

Sieges Even was a German progressive metal band from Munich. The band was originally formed under the name 'Sodom' (not to be confused with fellow German thrash metal band Sodom) in the early 1980s, released their first demo in 1983, and adopted the name Sieges Even in 1985. They recorded a series of demos, before securing a recording contract with Steamhammer Records in 1988. Their debut album, Life Cycle (1988), employed rapid time changes, which fragmented the songs, and although the album was well received in Germany, it had few buyers elsewhere. Sieges Even played mostly in the progressive metal genre, but experimented with different musical styles over the years.

In mid 2008, the band split up due to internal differences. Markus Steffen and Arno Menses formed the band Subsignal, while the Holzwarth brothers have been participating in various projects. Since 2011, they are both full members of Rhapsody of Fire.

== Personnel ==
=== Last members ===
- Arno Menses − lead vocals (The Art of Navigating by the Stars, Paramount, Playgrounds)
- Markus Steffen − guitar (all albums except Sophisticated, Uneven)
- Oliver Holzwarth − bass guitar
- Alex Holzwarth − drums

=== Past members ===
- Franz Herde – lead vocals (Life Cycle, Steps)
- Jogi Kaiser – lead vocals (A Sense of Change)
- Wolfgang Zenk – guitar (Sophisticated, Uneven)
- Greg Keller – lead vocals (Sophisticated, Uneven)
- Börk Keller − keyboards (Uneven)
- Markus Burchert – guitar
- Andre Matos – lead vocals

== Discography ==
=== Demos ===
- Demo (1983 as Sodom)
- Demo '86 (1986)
- Demo '87 (1987)
- Repression and Resistance (1988)
- What's Progressive? (1994)
- Equinox (2000 as Looking-Glass-Self)
- Footprints of Angels (2003 as Val'Paraiso)

=== Albums ===
- Life Cycle (1988)
- Steps (1990)
- A Sense of Change (1991)
- Sophisticated (1995)
- Uneven (1997)
- The Art of Navigating by the Stars (2005)
- Paramount (2007)
- Playgrounds (live album, 2008)
