= Garden of the Titans: Live at Red Rocks Amphitheater =

Live album by Opeth
- Released: 2 November 2018
- Recorded: 11 May 2017
- Venue: Red Rocks Amphitheater in Morrison, Colorado, US
- Genre: Progressive death metal; progressive rock
- Length: 88:06
- Label: Moderbolaget; Nuclear Blast

Opeth chronology
Sorceress (2016)	Garden of the Titans: Live at Red Rocks Amphitheater (2018)	In Cauda Venenum (2019)

Professional ratings
Review scores
Source	Rating
Blabbermouth.net	8/10 stars
Metal Injection	8/10 stars
Sonic Perspectives	8.5/10 stars

Garden of the Titans: Live at Red Rocks Amphitheater is the fourth live album and video by Swedish progressive metal band Opeth, released on 2 November 2018 via Nuclear Blast. It was recorded on 11 May 2017 at Red Rocks Amphitheatre in Morrison, Colorado, United States, as the band was touring the United States in support of their album Sorceress. It is their final live album to feature Martin Axenrot on drums.

== Track listing ==
All songs by Mikael Åkerfeldt except "Demon of the Fall" by Åkerfeldt and Peter Lindgren.

No.	Title	Original album	Length
1.	"Sorceress"	Sorceress	7:09
2.	"Ghost of Perdition"	Ghost Reveries	12:08
3.	"Demon of the Fall"	My Arms, Your Hearse	9:55
4.	"The Wilde Flowers"	Sorceress	8:42
5.	"In My Time of Need"	Damnation	5:44
6.	"The Devil's Orchard"	Heritage	7:10
7.	"Cusp of Eternity"	Pale Communion	5:14
8.	"Heir Apparent"	Watershed	10:21
9.	"Era"	Sorceress	7:30
10.	"Deliverance"	Deliverance	14:13
Total length:			88:06

== Personnel ==
- Travis Smith – cover art

== Charts ==
Chart (2018)	Peak position
Dutch Albums (Album Top 100)	195
Finnish Albums (Suomen virallinen lista)	9
German Albums (Offizielle Top 100)	17
Scottish Albums (OCC)	36
Spanish Albums (Promusicae)	86
UK Independent Albums (OCC)	11
UK Rock & Metal Albums (OCC)	3
US Independent Albums (Billboard)	7
US Top Album Sales (Billboard)	60
US Indie Store Album Sales (Billboard)	12
