= Storm Corrosion =

International folk duo

- Origin: Kingston upon Thames, England; Stockholm, Sweden
- Genres: Progressive folk; psychedelic folk
- Years active: 2010–2012; 2026–present
- Label: Roadrunner
- Members: Mikael Åkerfeldt; Steven Wilson
- Website: stormcorrosion.com

Storm Corrosion is a musical collaboration between Swedish musician Mikael Åkerfeldt of progressive metal band Opeth and English musician Steven Wilson of the progressive rock band Porcupine Tree. Åkerfeldt and Wilson began a longstanding musical partnership in 2001 when Wilson produced Opeth's fifth studio album Blackwater Park. The two began writing together for a new project in 2010, releasing their self-titled debut studio album in 2012 through Roadrunner Records.

A critical success, Storm Corrosion was a musical shift for Åkerfeldt and Wilson. Not wanting the project to be a progressive metal supergroup, the two used it as an opportunity to explore progressive folk, including influences from Comus and Scott Walker. No touring to promote the album was undertaken, nor were any plans for future music established at that time, with the two instead opting to return to their respective other musical projects. However on May 31, 2026, Wilson posted the following on Instagram: "Storm Corrosion 2, Stockholm, May 2026."

== History ==
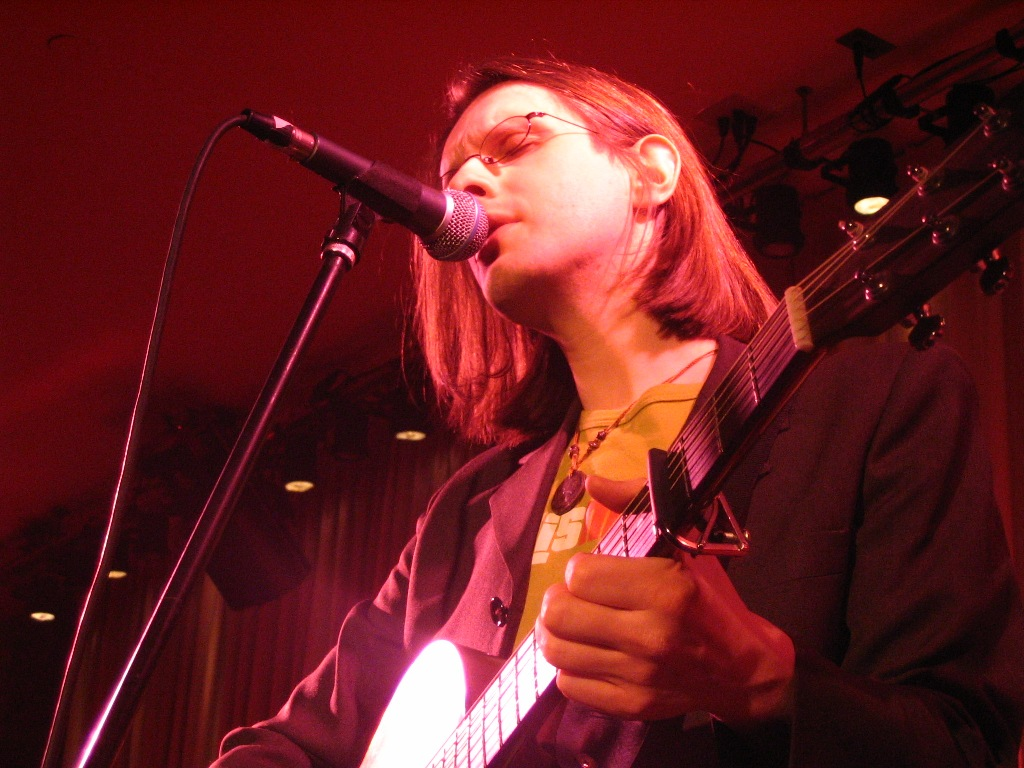
Steven Wilson in 2005

=== Formation ===
Mikael Åkerfeldt became aware of Steven Wilson in the mid-1990s after Åkerfeldt's best friend Jonas Renkse played him the Porcupine Tree album The Sky Moves Sideways. Years later, Åkerfeldt received a surprise e-mail from Wilson who had been given a copy of the Opeth album Still Life by a French journalist. The two ended up meeting for dinner in London where Åkerfeldt asked Wilson to produce the next Opeth album. It was also during this dinner that the two first spoke of a possible collaboration.

After their meeting in London, Åkerfeldt and Wilson began a longstanding musical partnership. Wilson went on to produce three Opeth albums – Blackwater Park, Deliverance, and Damnation – and mixed three Opeth albums, Heritage, Damnation, and Pale Communion. In 2005, Åkerfeldt contributed some guitar and vocals to Deadwing, Porcupine Tree's eighth album. Porcupine Tree and Opeth also co-headlined a North American tour together in the summer of 2003. Although the collaboration was announced as early as 2006, it was only in March 2010 that the two began writing music together, done on an on and off basis. Originally, Dream Theater drummer Mike Portnoy was to be involved, but was excluded because Åkerfeldt and Wilson felt the music would have little room for drums. In early 2011, Storm Corrosion was announced as the project's title.

=== Storm Corrosion (2010–2012, 2026-present) ===
After more than a year of writing, Storm Corrosion's first album was completed in September 2011. In February 2012, it was announced that the collaboration had signed with Roadrunner Records and that their album would be self-titled and released on 24 April. This release date was eventually pushed back to 8 May. The guitar work on the album was handled by Åkerfeldt while Wilson concentrated on the keyboards and song arrangement. Gavin Harrison of Porcupine Tree played drums, although only 15 to 20 percent of the album needed them. Reflecting back on their experience working together, Åkerfeldt and Wilson were largely positive, noting that they never had any artistic struggles over creative control and that each other's contributions were "exactly 50/50". Wilson has declared the album the completion of a trilogy, alongside Opeth's Heritage and Wilson's solo album Grace for Drowning, all of which were released over a year-long period from 2011 to 2012.

The first song used in promotion of Storm Corrosion was "Drag Ropes", released via YouTube on 24 April. Upon its release, the album was critically well received, and was nominated for the Album of the Year Award by Prog, presented by Classic Rock Magazine, and Best Surround Sound Album at the 2012 Grammy Awards. Åkerfeldt and Wilson chose not to tour or put on any live performances of the group's material, although Wilson did perform their single Drag Ropes on a few solo shows, during his Hand. Cannot. Erase. tour. While the two expressed interest in working together again, they do not particularly have any plans for any new Storm Corrosion material.

In 2019, Åkerfeldt said there were talks about a follow-up to the first one.

May 31, 2026, Wilson posted the following on Instagram: "Storm Corrosion 2, Stockholm, May 2026."

== Musical style ==
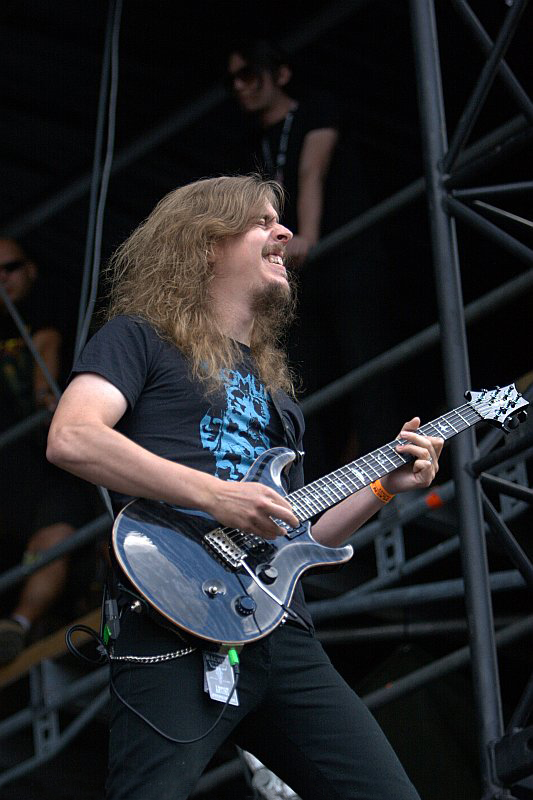
Mikael Åkerfeldt in 2006

Despite their reputations as frontmen in the heavy metal and progressive rock genres, Mikael Åkerfeldt and Steven Wilson did not want Storm Corrosion to be a progressive metal supergroup. In an early interview regarding the project, Wilson went so far as to say that the music sounded unlike anything he or Åkerfeldt had done up until that point, including the Opeth album Damnation. Instead, the two used the project as an opportunity to explore their more esoteric tastes in music, such as Comus, Popol Vuh, Univers Zero, Steve Reich, David Crosby, Talk Talk, and Scott Walker.

Storm Corrosion's sound can best be described as ambient and orchestral. In the press release for the self-titled first album, Åkerfeldt described the music as "a bit frightening, exhausting, profound and rather intense". In an interview with Face Culture, Wilson described the album as "mellow, strange, and disturbing". Critics have described the album's sound as having "an eerie gloom about the music that harks back to the drug-fuelled experimental avant-gardism of the 70s", "unhinged" and "experimental" but still "an unequivocal triumph", and with a "flowing and expansive folk-touched sound".

== Discography ==
Year	Album	Peak chart positions	
Year	Album	UK,	US
2012	Storm Corrosion: Release date: 7 May 2012; Label: Roadrunner Records	45	47
