= Heritage (Opeth album) =

Studio album by Opeth
- Released: 13 September 2011
- Recorded: 31 January – 21 February 2011; March 2011
- Studios: Atlantis, Stockholm, Sweden; No Man's Land, Hemel Hempstead, England (additional); Junkmail, Stockholm, Sweden (mellotron)
- Genres: Progressive rock; jazz rock
- Length: 57:04
- Label: Roadrunner
- Producer: Mikael Åkerfeldt

Opeth chronology
In Live Concert at the Royal Albert Hall (2010)	Heritage (2011)	Pale Communion (2014)

Opeth studio album chronology
Watershed (2008)	Heritage (2011)	Pale Communion (2014)

Singles from Heritage
- 1. "The Devil's Orchard" Released: 26 July 2011; 2. "Slither" Released: 21 November 2011

Heritage is the tenth studio album by Swedish progressive metal band Opeth. It was released on 13 September 2011 through Roadrunner Records. The album was recorded in early 2011 at Atlantis Studios in Stockholm and produced by Mikael Åkerfeldt, engineered by Janne Hansson, and mixed by Steven Wilson (the first album since 2003's Damnation on which he worked with the band, although not as producer). It takes on more of a progressive rock sound, something the band had wanted to do for some time, resulting in a stark contrast to the progressive death metal sounds of their past albums.

A critical and commercial success, the album sold 19,000 units in the United States in its debut week, charting at number 19 on the Billboard 200. The album was their first since 2003's Damnation not to feature Åkerfeldt's signature death growls, a style of singing he would not employ again until The Last Will and Testament in 2024.

== Background ==
During a press junket in September 2010 for In Live Concert at the Royal Albert Hall, Mikael Åkerfeldt told Classic Rock magazine that he was finally writing for a new Opeth album. On 31 January 2011, Opeth entered Atlantis/Metronome Studios in Stockholm to begin recording, with Janne Hansson engineering and Steven Wilson mixing. By late March, mixing was complete, and in April, Per Wiberg was relieved of his duties in Opeth as part of a mutual decision with the band. On 25 May, Heritage was announced as the album's title. On 26 July, the band premiered the album's first single, "The Devil's Orchard", on Stereogum. On 11 September, the album was streamed in its entirety on NPR Music. On 23 September, the music video for "The Devil's Orchard" was released.

== Artwork ==
The cover art for Heritage was revealed at the beginning of June 2011, done once again by longtime collaborator Travis Smith. In a video interview with Face Culture, Åkerfeldt said the album is rife with symbolism. The tree, reminiscent of a tree of life, represents the band flourishing in the present while its roots "going down to hell" represent the band's death metal history. The faces on the tree are those of the current band members, with Wiberg's head falling off the tree representing his departure. The skulls underneath the tree also represent past band members. The burning theatre in the distance represents the decline of civilization.

== Musical style ==
Åkerfeldt has been candid about the decision prompting the band to embrace progressive rock more openly and depart from the sound that Opeth has been pursuing for much of its preceding career:

I was a bit discouraged with the contemporary metal scene, and I wanted to break away from it even more. I feel we've been on the outskirts of that scene for a couple of years. I just couldn't see myself writing another album in the same vein as the last couple of records. Thankfully I listen to so many different kinds of music, and writing music has never been a problem. I've always seen Opeth as a band without boundaries. So if it's good and everybody in the band likes it, it's an Opeth record. In the end I sat down and wrote the music that I wanted to hear right now.

In the press release for Heritage, Mikael Åkerfeldt revealed that he felt as though he had been building to write the album since he was 19 years old. In a review for AllMusic, Thom Jurek called Heritage the band's most adventurous album, describing the songs as "drenched in instrumental interludes, knotty key and chord changes, shifting time signatures, clean vocals, and a keyboard-heavy instrumentation that includes Mellotrons, Rhodes pianos, and Hammond organs".

Originally, the first two songs Åkerfeldt wrote for Heritage were in the style of Watershed. After hearing the songs for the first time, Martín Méndez told Åkerfeldt that he would be disappointed if the album continued in that direction. Relieved that Méndez was not interested in doing another conventional Opeth album, Åkerfeldt scrapped the two songs and started the writing process over. After composing what would become "The Lines in My Hand", he decided to write the new album in a brand new style. Influenced by Chris Dangerous of The Hives, Åkerfeldt incorporated a "ride groove drum beat" from an unknown song by the aforementioned influence into the aforementioned Opeth song.

Heritage is influenced by a multitude of artists, including Alice Cooper and Magma. The album's title track is influenced by Swedish pianist Jan Johansson and Swedish folk music. "Slither" is a tribute to Ronnie James Dio, who died during the album's writing process.

== Trilogy ==
Steven Wilson has declared this album the first part of a trilogy, alongside Wilson's solo album Grace for Drowning and Storm Corrosion's self-titled album, all of which were released over a year-long period from 2011 to 2012.

== Critical reception ==
Professional ratings
Aggregate scores
Source	Rating
AnyDecentMusic?	7.2/10
Metacritic	71/100
Review scores
Source	Rating
AllMusic	4/5 stars
BBC Music	positive
The Guardian	4/5 stars
Metal Injection	7/10
Metal Storm	7.8/10
Pitchfork	6.9/10
PopMatters	8/10
Revolver	3.5/5 stars
Rolling Stone	3.5/5 stars
Sputnikmusic	4/5 stars

Heritage has received generally favorable reviews from music critics. At Metacritic (a review aggregator site which assigns a normalized rating out of 100 from music critics), based on 15 critics, the album has received a score of 71/100, which indicates "generally favorable reviews". Many critics praised the album's boldness, with Thom Jurek of AllMusic writing, "Love it or hate it, Heritage, for its many excesses – and stellar conception and execution – is a brave album".

Dom Lawson of The Guardian praised the band's new direction, saying, "The Swedes' 10th album, Heritage, is a brave, melancholic and often beautiful heavy rock record that revels in the warm, analogue tones and shimmering mellotrons of the pre-punk 70s while still exuding a sense of wonder at new ideas". Some critics have gone so far as to call it one of the band's best. In a positive review for PopMatters, Brice Ezell warned that the album takes some warming up to, commenting, "Heritage isn't the type of record to blow away one's mind upon first listen; it takes time to grow in its complexities". The album has won numerous awards from music publications and has been nominated for the Album of the Year Award by Prog, presented by Classic Rock.

Mixed reviews of the album have focused on its change in style from previous Opeth albums. Uncut magazine wrote, "On Heritage, [they're] jettisoning practically all trace of heavy whatsoever". Similarly, Kerrang! magazine wrote, "It's an album that succeeds on its own terms but if it really does mark the effective end of Opeth as a metal band, that will remain our loss". In a negative review for Drowned in Sound, Patrick Smith wrote, "Åkerfeldt should be praised for breaking free of an often repetitive genre – there's nothing wrong with radical reinvention. But this departure didn't need to be quite so lacklustre".

Many Opeth fans did not take too kindly to the abrupt change in style. In an interview, Mikael Åkerfeldt recalled a time after a concert when someone tried to fight him for not making death metal music anymore.

== Supporting tour ==
Opeth began a tour in support of Heritage in September 2011, headlining in North America with Katatonia. In November, the band toured Europe with Pain of Salvation. In April 2012, the band returned to North America and co-headlined the "Heritage Hunter Tour" with Mastodon, supported by Ghost. Opeth and Mastodon each headlined at specific venues.

== Track listing ==
All tracks are written by Mikael Åkerfeldt.

No.	Title	Length
1.	"Heritage" (instrumental)	2:04
2.	"The Devil's Orchard"	6:39
3.	"I Feel the Dark"	6:37
4.	"Slither"	3:59
5.	"Nepenthe"	5:37
6.	"Häxprocess"	6:57
7.	"Famine"	8:31
8.	"The Lines in My Hand"	3:48
9.	"Folklore"	8:17
10.	"Marrow of the Earth" (instrumental)	4:18
Total length:		57:04

Bonus tracks
No.	Title	Music	Length
11.	"Pyre"	Åkerfeldt, Fredrik Åkesson	5:32
12.	"Face in the Snow"		4:05
Total length:			66:41

== Personnel ==
Credits taken from AllMusic.

=== Opeth ===
- Mikael Åkerfeldt – guitar, Mellotron, grand piano, vocals, sound effects, mixing, engineering, production
- Fredrik Åkesson – guitar
- Per Wiberg – grand piano, Mellotron, Rhodes piano, Hammond B3
- Martín Méndez – bass guitar, upright bass
- Martin Axenrot – drums, percussion

=== Additional musicians ===
- Alex Acuña – percussion (track 7)
- Björn J:son Lindh – flute (track 7)
- Joakim Svalberg – grand piano (track 1)
- Charlie Dodd – sound effects (track 6)

=== Production ===
- Janne Hansson – engineering
- Steven Wilson – mixing, effects engineering, vocal engineering
- Peter Mew – mastering

=== Additional personnel ===
- Jasper Schuurmans – project coordinator
- Sandra Artigas – photography
- Travis Smith – art direction
- Monte Conner – A&R

== Chart positions ==
=== Weekly ===
Chart (2011)	Peak position
Australian Albums (ARIA)	12
Austrian Albums (Ö3 Austria)	16
Belgian Albums (Ultratop Flanders)	87
Belgian Albums (Ultratop Wallonia)	57
Canadian Albums (Billboard)	23
Danish Albums (Hitlisten)	8
Dutch Albums (Album Top 100)	10
Finnish Albums (Suomen virallinen lista)	2
French Albums (SNEP)	24
German Albums (Offizielle Top 100)	9
Hungarian Albums (MAHASZ)	22
Irish Albums (IRMA)	34
Italian Albums (FIMI)	21
New Zealand Albums (RMNZ)	26
Norwegian Albums (VG-lista)	8
Polish Albums (ZPAV)	28
Scottish Albums Chart (OCC)	22
Spanish Albums (PROMUSICAE)	49
Swedish Albums (Sverigetopplistan)	4
Swiss Albums (Schweizer Hitparade)	14
UK Albums (OCC)	22
UK Rock Albums Chart (OCC)	1
US Billboard 200	19
US Tastemakers Albums (Billboard)	2
US Top Hard Rock Albums (Billboard)	2
US Top Rock Albums (Billboard)	6
US World Albums (Billboard)	3

=== Monthly ===
Chart (2011)	Peak position
Poland (ZPAV Top 100)	41

== Release history ==
Heritage was released by Roadrunner Records. It was released on CD, as a standard edition release, special edition release, and a limited picture disc release. The special edition contains a DVD and a coin. The picture disc was limited to 500 copies and was released on 28 November 2011.

Region	Date
Japan	13 September 2011
Australia	16 September 2011
Belgium	16 September 2011
Germany	16 September 2011
Ireland	16 September 2011
Norway	16 September 2011
New Zealand	19 September 2011
Portugal	19 September 2011
United Kingdom	19 September 2011
United States	20 September 2011
Italy	20 September 2011
Spain	20 September 2011
Mexico	20 September 2011
