= Sorceress (Opeth album) =

Studio album by Opeth
- Released: 30 September 2016
- Recorded: May 2016
- Studios: Rockfield Studios in Monmouth, Wales; RAK Studios in London, England (strings); Junkmail Studios in Stockholm, Sweden (additional); Psalms Studios in Bath, England (additional)
- Genre: Progressive rock
- Length: 56:41
- Labels: Moderbolaget; Nuclear Blast
- Producers: Tom Dalgety; Mikael Åkerfeldt

Opeth chronology
Pale Communion (2014)	Sorceress (2016)	Garden of the Titans: Live at Red Rocks Amphitheater (2018)

Singles from Sorceress
- 1. "Sorceress" Released: 1 August 2016; 2. "Will O the Wisp" Released: 4 September 2016; 3. "The Wilde Flowers" Released: 21 September 2016; 4. "Era" Released: 23 January 2017

Professional ratings
Aggregate scores
Source	Rating
Metacritic	81/100
Review scores
Source	Rating
AllMusic	4/5 stars
Blabbermouth.net	7.5/10
Exclaim!	7/10
The Guardian	5/5 stars
Kerrang!	4/5 stars
Metal Injection	8.5/10
Metal Storm	7.2/10
Pitchfork	6.7/10
PopMatters	8/10
Sputnikmusic	4.1/5

Sorceress is the twelfth studio album by Swedish progressive metal band Opeth. The album was released on 30 September 2016 via record label Nuclear Blast and the band's own imprint Moderbolaget.

== Background ==
The album was produced and mixed by Tom Dalgety and mainly recorded at Rockfield Studios in Wales, where the band recorded most of their previous album Pale Communion in 2014 and to where the band would return to record The Last Will And Testament in 2024. Following the album's release, the band embarked on a world tour with bands the Sword, Sahg, and Myrkur as supporting acts. Thematically, the album draws inspiration from Åkerfeldt's personal life, as he divorced in 2016. The album was streamed via SoundCloud on 29 September.

== Track listing ==
All tracks are written by Mikael Åkerfeldt, except "Strange Brew" music composed by Åkerfeldt and Fredrik Åkesson.

No.	Title	Length
1.	"Persephone"	1:52
2.	"Sorceress"	5:49
3.	"The Wilde Flowers"	6:49
4.	"Will o the Wisp"	5:07
5.	"Chrysalis"	7:16
6.	"Sorceress 2"	3:49
7.	"The Seventh Sojourn"	5:29
8.	"Strange Brew"	8:44
9.	"A Fleeting Glance"	5:06
10.	"Era"	5:41
11.	"Persephone (Slight Return)"	0:54
Total length:		56:41

Limited edition bonus tracks
No.	Title	Length
12.	"The Ward"	3:14
13.	"Spring MCMLXXIV"	6:11
14.	"Cusp of Eternity" (live with The Plovdiv Philharmonic Orchestra)	5:44
15.	"The Drapery Falls" (live with The Plovdiv Philharmonic Orchestra)	10:23
16.	"Voice of Treason" (live with The Plovdiv Philharmonic Orchestra)	8:10
Total length:		90:26

== Personnel ==
=== Opeth ===
- Mikael Åkerfeldt – vocals, electric and acoustic guitars, production
- Fredrik Åkesson – electric and acoustic guitars, backing vocals
- Joakim Svalberg – Hammond C3, Mellotron, Fender Rhodes 88, harpsichord, Yamaha grand piano, Minimoog, percussion, backing vocals
- Martín Méndez – bass guitars
- Martin Axenrot – drums, percussion

=== Additional personnel ===
- Pascale Marie Vickery – spoken words on "Persephone" and "Persephone (Slight Return)"
- Wil Malone – string arrangements
- Tom Dalgety – engineering, mixing, production
- John Davis – mastering
- Travis Smith – cover art

== Charts ==
Chart (2016)	Peak position
Australian Albums (ARIA)	7
Austrian Albums (Ö3 Austria)	10
Belgian Albums (Ultratop Flanders)	16
Belgian Albums (Ultratop Wallonia)	20
Canadian Albums (Billboard)	13
Dutch Albums (Album Top 100)	11
Finnish Albums (Suomen virallinen lista)	3
French Albums (SNEP)	29
German Albums (Offizielle Top 100)	1
Hungarian Albums (MAHASZ)	18
Italian Albums (FIMI)	12
New Zealand Albums (RMNZ)	28
Norwegian Albums (VG-lista)	8
Polish Albums (ZPAV)	17
Portuguese Albums (AFP)	20
Scottish Albums (Official Charts)	10
Spanish Albums (PROMUSICAE)	31
Swedish Albums (Sverigetopplistan)	7
Swiss Albums (Schweizer Hitparade)	6
UK Albums (Official Charts)	11
UK Album Downloads (Official Charts)	32
UK Independent Albums (Official Charts)	5
UK Progressive Albums (Official Charts)	3
UK Rock & Metal Albums (Official Charts)	1
US Billboard 200	24
US Top Hard Rock Albums (Billboard)	1
US Independent Albums (Billboard)	4
US Indie Store Album Sales (Billboard)	4
US Top Rock Albums (Billboard)	7
