= Waltteri Väyrynen =

Finnish drummer (born 1994)

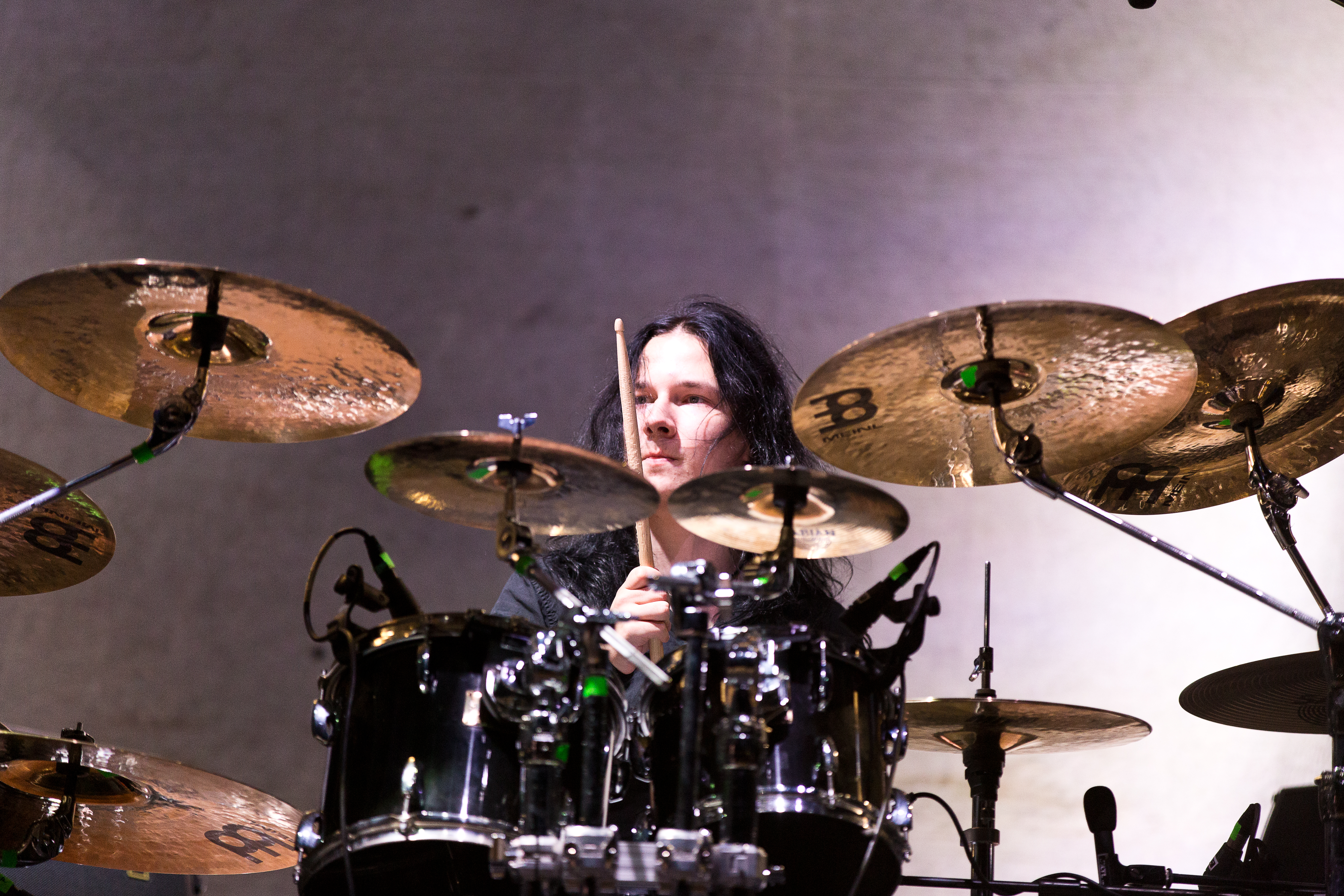
- Väyrynen playing live with Paradise Lost in 2016

Background information
- Born: 5 July 1994 (age 31); Helsinki, Finland
- Genres: Progressive metal; death metal; gothic metal
- Occupation: Drummer
- Years active: 2011–present
- Member of: Opeth, Abhorrence

Waltteri Väyrynen (born 5 July 1994) is a Finnish drummer who is currently a member of Opeth and Abhorrence.

Väyrynen was previously the drummer for Paradise Lost, where he was first a session member from 2015 to 2016 and an official member from 2016 to 2022. He has also played in Paradise Lost guitarist Gregor Mackintosh's band Vallenfyre and Tomi Koivusaari's band Abhorrence. In 2020, Väyrynen joined Bodom After Midnight, while also continuing to play in Paradise Lost. In September 2022, Väyrynen left Paradise Lost and joined the Swedish band Opeth, replacing Martin Axenrot.

Other groups he has played for include Bloodbath (live), Strigoi, Amorphis, Bjørkø, Bodom After Midnight, I Am the Night, The Hypothesis, Eilera, The Eternal, Lost in Grey, Spiine, The Ghost I’ve Become and Carcass (live).

Väyrynen has stated that he was influenced by drummers such as Dirk Verbeuren, Daniel Erlandsson, Kai Hahto, Heikki Sarri, and Daniel Moilanen.

== Discography ==
=== The Hypothesis ===
- Origin (2016)

=== Vallenfyre ===
- Fear Those Who Fear Him (2017)

=== Paradise Lost ===
- Medusa (2017)
- Obsidian (2020)

=== Abhorrence ===
- Megalohydrothassalophobic (2018)

=== Bodom After Midnight ===
- Paint the Sky with Blood (2021)

=== Opeth ===
- The Last Will and Testament (2024)
