= In Cauda Venenum =

Studio album by Opeth
- Released: 27 September 2019
- Recorded: 18 November 2018 – 6 March 2019
- Studio: Park Studios / Psykbunkern in Stockholm, Sweden; Junkmail Studios in Stockholm, Sweden; Angel Recording Studios in London, England
- Genre: Progressive rock; progressive metal
- Length: 67:57
- Language: English; Swedish
- Label: Moderbolaget; Nuclear Blast
- Producer: Opeth; Mikael Åkerfeldt; Stefan Boman; Dave Stewart

Opeth chronology
Garden of the Titans: Live at Red Rocks Amphitheater (2018)	In Cauda Venenum (2019)	The Last Will and Testament (2024)

Singles from In Cauda Venenum
- 1. "Heart in Hand" / "Hjärtat vet vad handen gör" Released: July 12, 2019; 2. "Dignity" / "Svekets Prins" Released: August 16, 2019

In Cauda Venenum (Latin for "Poison in the tail") is the thirteenth studio album by Swedish progressive metal band Opeth, released on 27 September 2019 through Moderbolaget and Nuclear Blast. It was released in two versions: a Swedish-language version and an English-language version. The band toured in support of the album throughout 2019 and into 2020. At 67 minutes and 57 seconds, it is the band's longest studio album. It is also the band's last album to feature drummer Martin Axenrot before his departure in 2021.

== Critical reception ==
Professional ratings
Aggregate scores
Source	Rating
Metacritic	85/100
Review scores
Source	Rating
AllMusic	4/5 stars
Blabbermouth.net	8/10
Exclaim!	favorable
Consequence of Sound	A
Kerrang!	3/5
Metal Storm	7.8/10
NME	4/5 stars
PopMatters	9/10
The Quietus	favourable
Sputnikmusic	3.7/5

At Metacritic, which assigns a normalized rating out of 100 using reviews from mainstream critics, the album received an average score of 85, based on 10 reviews, which indicates "universal acclaim". The album received a score of 10 out of 10 from Wall of Sound, who stated it was "the best album the band has ever created in their prog era". Loudwire named it one of the 50 best metal albums of 2019.

== Track listing ==
All tracks are written by Mikael Åkerfeldt.

English version
No.	Title	Length
1.	"Garden of Earthly Delights"	3:28
2.	"Dignity"	6:36
3.	"Heart in Hand"	8:30
4.	"Next of Kin"	7:10
5.	"Lovelorn Crime"	6:34
6.	"Charlatan"	5:29
7.	"Universal Truth"	7:30
8.	"The Garroter"	6:45
9.	"Continuum"	7:22
10.	"All Things Will Pass"	8:33
Total length:		67:57

Swedish version
No.	Title	Length
1.	"Livets trädgård"	3:28
2.	"Svekets prins"	6:36
3.	"Hjärtat vet vad handen gör"	8:29
4.	"De närmast sörjande"	7:10
5.	"Minnets yta"	6:34
6.	"Charlatan"	5:29
7.	"Ingen sanning är allas"	7:21
8.	"Banemannen"	6:43
9.	"Kontinuerlig drift"	7:23
10.	"Allting tar slut"	8:31
Total length:		67:44

Extended Edition
No.	Title	Length
1.	"Garden of Earthly Delights"	3:28
2.	"Dignity"	6:36
3.	"Heart in Hand"	8:30
4.	"Next of Kin"	7:10
5.	"Lovelorn Crime"	6:34
6.	"Charlatan"	5:29
7.	"Universal Truth"	7:30
8.	"The Garroter"	6:45
9.	"Continuum"	7:22
10.	"All Things Will Pass"	8:33
11.	"The Mob"	4:36
12.	"Width of a Circle"	5:31
13.	"Freedom & Tyranny"	4:35
14.	"Livets trädgård"	3:28
15.	"Svekets prins"	6:36
16.	"Hjärtat vet vad handen gör"	8:29
17.	"De närmast sörjande"	7:10
18.	"Minnets yta"	6:34
19.	"Charlatan"	5:29
20.	"Ingen sanning är allas"	7:21
21.	"Banemannen"	6:43
22.	"Kontinuerlig drift"	7:23
23.	"Allting tar slut"	8:31
24.	"Pöbeln"	4:36
25.	"Cirkelns riktning"	5:31
26.	"Frihet & tyranni"	4:35

== Personnel ==
=== Opeth ===
- Mikael Åkerfeldt – lead and backing vocals, guitars and ramblings, string arrangements
- Fredrik Åkesson – lead and rhythm guitars, backing vocals, whistles, coughs
- Martin Axenrot – drums and percussion
- Martín Méndez – bass guitars
- Joakim Svalberg – keyboards and backing vocals

Technical personnel

- Mikael Åkerfeldt – production
- Stefan Boman with Opeth – co-production, engineering, mixing
- Tom Jondelius – studio assistant
- Dave Stewart – string arrangements
- Geoff Pesche – mastering at Abbey Road Studios
- Travis Smith – artwork and design for Seempieces
- Jasper Schuurmans – project coordination

== Charts ==
Chart (2019)	Peak position
Australian Albums (ARIA)	20
Austrian Albums (Ö3 Austria)	15
Belgian Albums (Ultratop Flanders)	17
Belgian Albums (Ultratop Wallonia)	13
Canadian Albums (Billboard)	49
Dutch Albums (Album Top 100)	16
Finnish Albums (Suomen virallinen lista)	2
German Albums (Offizielle Top 100)	5
Hungarian Albums (MAHASZ)	29
Irish Albums (IRMA)	65
Italian Albums (FIMI)	24
Japanese Albums (Oricon)	97
Norwegian Albums (VG-lista)	9
Polish Albums (ZPAV)	19
Scottish Albums (OCC)	4
Spanish Albums (PROMUSICAE)	26
Swedish Albums (Sverigetopplistan)	12
Swiss Albums (Schweizer Hitparade)	10
UK Albums (OCC)	13
UK Album Downloads (OCC)	12
UK Independent Albums (OCC)	1
UK Progressive Albums (OCC)	1
UK Rock & Metal Albums (OCC)	1
US Billboard 200	59
US Independent Albums (Billboard)	2
US Top Hard Rock Albums (Billboard)	3
US Top Rock Albums (Billboard)	9
US Indie Store Album Sales (Billboard)	4
