= Brave Murder Day =

Studio album by Katatonia
- Released: 1996
- Recorded: July 1996
- Studio: Unisound Studios
- Genres: Death-doom; gothic metal
- Length: 41:13
- Label: Avantgarde Music
- Producer: Katatonia

Katatonia chronology
For Funerals to Come... (1995)	Brave Murder Day (1996)	Sounds of Decay (1997)

Professional ratings
Review scores
Source	Rating
AllMusic	4/5 stars

Brave Murder Day is the second studio album by Swedish heavy metal band Katatonia, released on 1 August 1996 by Avantgarde Music. The lead vocals on the album are provided by Mikael Åkerfeldt of Opeth, as Katatonia frontman Jonas Renkse was medically unable to perform screamed vocals anymore following health issues that arose from performing the band's debut. It was also the band's first album with second guitarist Fredrik Norrman.

== Music ==
The band described the album as having "early Paradise Lost influence (mixed with others such as Kent and Slowdive)". The album also contains softer sections. AllMusic describes the album as having a "gloomy theme".

== Release ==
The original version of the record was not mastered, but the 2006 Peaceville Records re-release finally represented a mastered version of the album and included the Sounds of Decay EP as bonus tracks. The remastered edition also includes new liner notes by Anders Nyström. The previous Century Black reissue of the album included the four tracks from the band's For Funerals to Come... EP. A vinyl release was issued through the band's Northern Silence Productions.

== Track listing ==
All lyrics written by Jonas Renkse, all music composed by Katatonia.

No.	Title	Note	Length
1.	"Brave"		10:16
2.	"Murder"	(Note: "Murder" and "Rainroom" are featured on Brave Yester Days.)	4:54
3.	"Day"		4:28
4.	"Rainroom"		6:31
5.	"12"	(Note: "12" is a re-recorded version of the song "Black Erotica" from the W.A.R. Compilation Volume 1 (1995). The song can also be found on the 2004 compilation Brave Yester Days.)	8:18
6.	"Endtime"	(Note: "Endtime" is one of very few Katatonia recordings to utilize samples, featuring a clip of dialogue from the Stanley Kubrick film The Shining during the latter half of the song's lengthy intro.)	6:46
Total length:			41:13

Century Black reissue
No.	Title	Length
7.	"Funeral Wedding"	8:40
8.	"Shades of Emerald Fields"	5:24
9.	"For Funerals to Come..."	2:50
10.	"Epistel"	1:13
Total length:		59:20

IROND Records reissue
No.	Title	Length
7.	"Nowhere"	6:08
8.	"At Last"	6:13
9.	"Inside the Fall"	6:20
10.	"Funeral Wedding"	8:40
11.	"Shades of Emerald Fields"	5:25
12.	"For Funerals to Come..."	2:50
13.	"Epistel"	1:14
Total length:		78:01

Peaceville Records 2006 reissue
No.	Title	Length
7.	"Nowhere"	6:08
8.	"At Last"	6:13
9.	"Inside the Fall"	6:20
Total length:		59:54

== Personnel ==
The list of personnel involved in this album, as it appears in the booklet:

Band

- Mikael Åkerfeldt — lead vocals (except track 3)
- Anders Nyström — bass
- Fredrik Norrman — guitars
- Jonas Renkse — drums, backing vocals, lead vocals on track 3

Production

- Dan Swanö — engineering
- Bildhuset — front and back cover photos
- Lennart Kaltea — photos
- Tom — digital design
