= Sounds of Decay =

EP by Katatonia
- Released: 8 December 1997
- Recorded: February 1997
- Studio: Sunlight Studio
- Genre: Death-doom
- Length: 18:41
- Label: Avantgarde Music
- Producer: Katatonia

Katatonia chronology
Brave Murder Day (1996)	Sounds of Decay (1997)	Saw You Drown (1998)

Sounds of Decay is the third EP by Swedish heavy metal band Katatonia, released in 1997. The front cover is a screenshot of a decrepit god, taken from the movie Begotten.

There is an unreleased version of this EP on which Fred Norrman recorded. The band had to record the EP twice, as during the first recording, the result was terrible due to the band being very hungover. And for unknown reasons, they had not called Fred back to do the recording again. According to Mikael Åkerfeldt, he prefers the unreleased version, as it is "a lot more brutal." This release is the last Katatonia material to feature any death metal-elements, it’s also Åkerfeldt’s final collaboration with the group.

A fourth song named "Untrue" was also recorded in the studio session, but it did not end up on the original release. It was later released on the Brave Yester Days compilation album in 2004; it is the only material released from the first session.

The EP was also featured on the 2006 Peaceville reissue of the Brave Murder Day album.

== Track listing ==
All music is composed by Katatonia.

No.	Title	Lyrics	Length
1.	"Nowhere"	Renkse	6:08
2.	"At Last"	Blackheim	6:13
3.	"Inside the Fall"	Renkse	6:20

Irond Records reissue, 2004
No.	Title	Length
1.	"Brave"	10:17
2.	"Murder"	4:54
3.	"Day"	4:29
4.	"Rainroom"	6:32
5.	"12"	8:18
6.	"Endtime"	6:46
7.	"Nowhere"	6:08
8.	"At Last"	6:13
9.	"Inside the Fall"	6:22
10.	"Funeral Wedding"	8:40
11.	"Shades of Emeralds Fields"	5:25
12.	"For Funerals to Come"	2:50
13.	"Epistel"	1:14

== Credits ==
=== Katatonia ===
- Mikael Åkerfeldt – vocals
- Anders Nyström – guitar, bass
- Jonas Renkse – drums

=== Production ===
- Tomas Skogsberg – mixing
