= For Funerals to Come... =

EP by Katatonia
- Released: February 1995
- Recorded: September 1994
- Studio: Unisound Studios
- Genres: Death-doom, black-doom
- Length: 18:07 (standard version); 34:08 (2011 re-issue)
- Labels: Avantgarde Music; Peaceville Records (2011 re-issue)
- Producer: Katatonia

Katatonia chronology
Dance of December Souls (1993)	For Funerals to Come... (1995)	Brave Murder Day (1996)

Professional ratings
Review scores
Source	Rating
AllMusic	2/5 stars

For Funerals to Come... is the second EP by Swedish heavy metal band Katatonia, released in 1995. It was re-released on vinyl together with Brave Murder Day by Century in 2009 (150 orange and 350 yellow). It was re-issued again by Peaceville Records in November 2011.

== Track listing ==
1. "Funeral Wedding" – 8:40
2. "Shades of Emerald Fields" – 5:24
3. "For Funerals to Come..." – 2:50
4. "Epistel" – 1:13

2011 track listing

1. "Funeral Wedding" – 8:40
2. "Shades of Emerald Fields" – 5:24
3. "For Funerals to Come" – 2:50
4. "Epistel" – 1:13
5. "Black Erotica" – 9:08
6. "Love of the Swan" – 6:53
- Music by Nystrom
- Lyrics by Renkse except "Shades of Emerald Fields" by Le Huche
- "Black Erotica" and "Love of the Swan" were taken from the W.A.R. Compilation – Volume One album, which was released in 1995 by Wrong Again Records, recorded at Unisound Studios in June 1994

== Personnel ==
Band

- Jonas Renkse – vocals, drums
- Anders Nyström – guitars, keyboards, additional vocals
- Guillaume Le Huche – bass

Production

- Dan Swanö – mixing, engineering
