= Storm Corrosion (album) =

Studio album by Storm Corrosion
- Released: May 7, 2012
- Recorded: March 2010 – September 2011
- Studios: No Man's Land (Hemel Hempstead); Koolworld (Luton); Angel Recording Studios (London)
- Genres: Progressive folk; psychedelic folk
- Length: 47:49
- Label: Roadrunner
- Producer: Storm Corrosion

Collector's Edition
- Storm Corrosion Collector's Edition double LP set and Special Edition Blu-ray/CD bundle

Storm Corrosion is the self-titled debut studio album from Storm Corrosion, the musical collaboration between Mikael Åkerfeldt, frontman of Opeth, and Steven Wilson, frontman of Porcupine Tree. The only Storm Corrosion album to date, it was released on May 7, 2012 by Roadrunner Records.

== Background ==
Having worked with each other in the past, Åkerfeldt and Wilson decided to start work on a collaboration, on an intermittent basis, in March 2010. Wilson later said that only "15–20%" of the album would have drums on it, performed by Porcupine Tree drummer Gavin Harrison. The album was completed in September 2011, but held back for an April 23, 2012 release so that Wilson could concentrate on releasing and promoting his second solo album, Grace for Drowning, and Åkerfeldt could concentrate on Opeth's tenth studio album Heritage, both albums being released in September 2011 themselves. Wilson said of the project:

Because I think we both had this idea of this kind of music that we knew we couldn't get our bands to play, but that we both kind of understood where we were coming from. 'Cause we have this kind of passion: very experimental, obscure records, almost orchestral in their scope. And we wanted to make a record like that for a long time. It's a long way from metal and it's a long way from anything that, I think, Mikael has ever done, including [Opeth's] Damnation record. I think a lot of people thought, 'Oh, it's gonna be like Damnation.' It's not; it's a long way from that, too. And it's actually a long way from anything I've done…The one thing we didn't wanna do is get together and do a prog-metal supergroup, which would have been so easy to do – and kind of expected, in a way. And, you know, we might do that anyway one day. But this time around, we thought, 'Let's just do this record.' Some people will love it and some people will not, and that's OK, because, in a way, I don't think we wanted to just give what was expected, and we're certainly not doing that.

Wilson also said that on the album, Åkerfeldt did most of the guitar work, while Wilson concentrated on the keyboard parts and arranging the music. He described it as containing a lot of orchestral parts, and as "mellow, strange, and disturbing".

== Reception and sales ==
Professional ratings
Aggregate scores
Source	Rating
Metacritic	81/100
Review scores
Source	Rating
AllMusic	3.5/5 stars
Sputnikmusic	4/5 stars
The Guardian	4/5 stars
Revolver	3.5/5 stars

The album has received generally positive reviews, with many reviewers concluding that, while the album was very different from either of the two contributor's other bands, the album was still good by its own merits. Allmusic gave it a 3.5 out of 5, concluding that the album's worth may vary depending on the listener's expectations, stating "Given the nature of their earlier collaborations, fans diving into Storm Corrosion expecting a sequel to Blackwater Park are going to be disappointed as they unexpectedly hit the shallow end of the pool, but even though the album doesn't sound much like the metal masterpiece, that doesn't make it unworthy of a listener's attention, and anyone open-minded enough to approach the project without any expectations will be quickly swept off into the spacious perennial twilight created by these two master craftsmen." Revolver gave it an identical 3.5 out of 5 score for similar reasons, stating: "Many Opeth and Porcupine Tree fans may be disappointed with the lack of heavy riffage, but those with open minds will find much to enjoy in this dense, atmospheric album." The BBC praised the album as a "magnificently retro album", comparing it favorably to "drug-fuelled experimental avant-gardism of the 70s". The Guardian gave the album a 4 out of 5, stating the album "...could confound and irritate as many as they enchant, but as an immersive journey into uncharted territory, Storm Corrosion is an unequivocal triumph".

Other reviewers were less enthusiastic to the album's sound, with Powerline magazine giving the album a 1.5 out of 5 rating, calling it a "silly, self-indulgent, meandering 48 minutes of uninspired progressive noodling, and one that deserves to be quickly forgotten by fans of either founding musician".

The album debuted at number 86 on the Canadian Albums Chart.

The album was nominated for the Grammy Award for Best Surround Sound Album.

== Track listing ==
All lyrics are written by Steven Wilson except on "Ljudet Innan" which was written by both Wilson and Mikael Åkerfeldt; all music is composed by Mikael Åkerfeldt and Steven Wilson.

Standard edition
No.	Title	Length
1.	"Drag Ropes"	9:52
2.	"Storm Corrosion"	10:09
3.	"Hag"	6:28
4.	"Happy"	4:53
5.	"Lock Howl"	6:10
6.	"Ljudet Innan"	10:16
Total length:		47:49

Limited Blu-ray edition
No.	Title	Length
7.	"Drag Ropes" (instrumental)	9:38
8.	"Storm Corrosion" (instrumental)	10:11
9.	"Hag" (instrumental)	6:24
10.	"Happy" (instrumental)	4:52
11.	"Ljudet Innan" (instrumental)	10:15
12.	"Drag Ropes" (demo)	9:50
13.	"Hag" (demo)	8:32
Total length:		67:30

The limited edition contains:

Double LP set:

- Limited edition double LP set of the album with exclusive artwork
- 180 gram black virgin vinyl in gatefold jacket
- Digital download of high quality Flac files of the album
- Autographed 12" × 12" poster of exclusive artwork
- 24" × 36" fold out poster of exclusive artwork

Blu-ray/CD:

- 5.1 channel audio mix of the album
- Two exclusive demo tracks
- Five instrumental tracks
- Storm Corrosion CD

== Personnel ==
Storm Corrosion

- Mikael Åkerfeldt – vocals, guitars
- Steven Wilson – vocals, keyboards, string arrangements (1)

Additional musicians

- Gavin Harrison – drums, percussion
- Ben Castle – woodwind
- The London Session Orchestra (tracks 1, 2 and 5)
  - Conducted by Dave Stewart

Album packaging

- Carl Glover – album design layout
- Hans Arnold – cover painting
- Naki – photography

Other

- Mat Collis – recording on grand piano, engineering
- Isobel Griffiths – contractor (strings session fixer)
