= Pale Communion =

Studio album by Opeth
- Released: 26 August 2014
- Studio: Rockfield, Monmouth, Wales; Junkmail, Stockholm, Sweden (mellotron); Atlantis, Stockholm, Sweden (Hammond organ); Angel, London, UK (strings)
- Genre: Progressive rock
- Length: 56:00
- Label: Roadrunner
- Producer: Mikael Åkerfeldt, Tom Dalgety

Opeth chronology
Heritage (2011)	Pale Communion (2014)	Sorceress (2016)

Singles from Pale Communion
- 1. "Cusp of Eternity" Released: 3 June 2014

Pale Communion is the eleventh studio album by Swedish progressive metal band Opeth. The album was released on 26 August 2014 through Roadrunner Records. The album was produced by Mikael Åkerfeldt and mixed by Steven Wilson. Pale Communion is the first album with keyboardist Joakim Svalberg after the departure of Per Wiberg in 2011. The album sold 19,090 copies in its first week of release in the United States, debuting at number 19 on the Billboard 200.

== Musical style ==
Mikael Åkerfeldt said of the album, "I wanted to do something more melodic with this album, so there's stronger vocal melodies and more melodies overall for this album." Greg Kennelty of Metal Injection said the album does not contain "growls or death metal vocals". He also described the album as "the missing link between Damnation and Ghost Reveries or if Heritage was written directly after Ghost Reveries without Watershed having ever existed".

AllMusic's Thom Jurek has compared the album to Deep Purple's In Rock and King Crimson's early music, as well as noting the influence from jazz fusion.

== Artwork ==
The cover art was designed by Travis Smith, who has designed several previous Opeth album covers. The artwork contains Latin text. The left panel quotes Axel Oxenstierna: "Don't you know, my son, with how little wisdom the world is governed?" (An nescis, mi fili, quantilla prudentia mundus regatur?). The middle panel quotes Terence: "In these days friends are won through flattery, the truth gives birth to hate." (Hoc tempore obsequium amicos, veritas odium parit, Andria, vv. 67-68). The right panel quotes Marcus Valerius Martialis: "He grieves truly who grieves without a witness." (Ille dolet vere qui sine teste dolet, Epigrammata, I, 33).

== Reception ==
Professional ratings
Aggregate scores
Source	Rating
AnyDecentMusic?	7.5/10
Metacritic	75/100
Review scores
Source	Rating
About.com	4/5 stars
AllMusic	4/5 stars
Alternative Press	4/5 stars
Blabbermouth.net	10/10
Exclaim!	7/10
The Guardian	5/5 stars
The List	5/5 stars
Pitchfork	4.3/10
PopMatters	8/10
Sputnikmusic	3.5/5

Pale Communion was met with positive reviews from music critics. At Metacritic (a review aggregator site which assigns a normalized rating out of 100 from music critics), based on 12 critics, the album has received a score of 75/100, which indicates "generally favorable" reviews.

Writing for The Guardian, Dom Lawson gave the album a perfect rating, giving particular praise to Mikael Åkerfeldt's singing, writing that "his ability to tug at heartstrings while singing the most wilfully hazy of lyrics is matched only by these songs' beautiful arrangements and pin-sharp ensemble playing." He singled out the closing track for particular praise, describing it as "at once the most profoundly moving song Åkerfeldt has ever written, and a tantalising glimpse into one possible future for this peerless band."

Thom Jurek also praised the album in the review for AllMusic. In the article, he compared it to Opeth's previous albums, claiming "Truthfully, they had been exploring prog in fits and starts since 2005's Ghost Reveries. Pale Communion completes the transition, proving that Heritage was not only a next step, but a new beginning altogether... Pale Communion is more focused and refined than Heritage. Though they readily display numerous musical influences here, ultimately Opeth sound like no one but themselves. This set is a massive leap forward, not only in terms of style but also in its instrumental and performance acumen; it is nearly unlimited in its creativity."

Sarah Kitteringham was more reserved in her appraisal of the album for Exclaim!, stating "The tracks run long (nothing below four-and-a-half minutes), and the highlights come for those with patience (the album peaks, like Heritage did, in the latter half); Pale Communion is a grower. One particular element that runs through the entirety of Opeth's discography is copiously present: those ominous riffs and a sense of moody, brooding emotionality. It certainly won't be enough to appease Opeth fans infuriated by Heritage (or, if you go further back, by the polarizing Watershed), but it will intrigue and appease those willing to accept the band's expanded sound."

Pitchfork's Grayson Currin was considerably more critical about the album: "Pale Communion, Opeth's first album in three years, lacks the absolute willpower and prevailing ambition of the band’s best work—that is, the core that made the awkwardness sufferable." Grayson concluded his review by writing, "Even if you couldn’t abide the inflexibility of their methodical grandeur, it was hard to condemn the immense effort and imagination involved. But Pale Communion only toys with the building blocks, revealing influences that were already apparent but refusing to invigorate them alongside each other. It's not that Opeth isn't cool here. It's that these eight songs run cold on new energies and ideas, a rarity for a catalog custom-made to overwhelm."

== Track listing ==
All tracks are written by Mikael Åkerfeldt.

No.	Title	Length
1.	"Eternal Rains Will Come"	6:46
2.	"Cusp of Eternity"	5:36
3.	"Moon Above, Sun Below"	10:53
4.	"Elysian Woes"	4:48
5.	"Goblin" (instrumental)	4:34
6.	"River"	7:33
7.	"Voice of Treason"	8:01
8.	"Faith in Others"	7:42
Total length:		56:00

Live bonus tracks, recorded at the Södra Teatern, Stockholm on December 4, 2012
No.	Title	Length
9.	"Solitude" (Black Sabbath cover, Blu-ray bonus track)	5:58
10.	"Var kommer barnen in" (Hansson De Wolfe United cover, Blu-ray bonus track)	5:51
11.	"Atonement" (Japan bonus track)	8:13
12.	"Demon of the Fall" (Japan bonus track)	6:13
Total length:		82:15

== Personnel ==
=== Opeth ===
- Mikael Åkerfeldt – lead vocals, lead guitar; songwriting, art direction, engineering
- Fredrik Åkesson – lead guitar, backing vocals
- Martín Méndez – bass guitar
- Joakim Svalberg – keyboard, backing vocals; piano
- Martin Axenrot – drums, percussion

=== Additional personnel ===
- Dave Stewart – string arrangements
- Tom Dalgety – engineering, production
- Janne Hansson – engineering
- Steven Wilson – mixing, backing vocals
- Paschal Byrne – mastering
- Travis Smith – cover art
- Colin Bradburne – recording (bonus tracks)
- João Paulo Costa Dias – recording (bonus tracks)

== Chart positions ==
Chart (2014)	Peak position
Australian Albums (ARIA)	17
Austrian Albums (Ö3 Austria)	11
Belgian Albums (Ultratop Flanders)	142
Belgian Albums (Ultratop Wallonia)	158
Canadian Albums (Billboard)	9
Danish Albums (Hitlisten)	13
Dutch Albums (Album Top 100)	23
French Albums (SNEP)	45
Finnish Albums (Suomen virallinen lista)	1
German Albums (Offizielle Top 100)	3
Hungarian Albums (MAHASZ)	5
Irish Albums (IRMA)	34
Italian Albums (FIMI)	37
New Zealand Albums (RMNZ)	26
Norwegian Albums (VG-lista)	5
Polish Albums (ZPAV)	42
Scottish Albums (OCC)	13
Spanish Albums (Promusicae)	45
Swedish Albums (Sverigetopplistan)	3
Swiss Albums (Schweizer Hitparade)	24
UK Albums (OCC)	14
UK Album Downloads (OCC)	48
UK Rock & Metal Albums (OCC)	1
US Billboard 200	19
US Top Hard Rock Albums (Billboard)	2
US Top Rock Albums (Billboard)	4
US Indie Store Album Sales (Billboard)	3
