= The Last Will and Testament =

Studio album by Opeth
- Released: 22 November 2024
- Recorded: February–March 2024
- Studios: Rockfield (Monmouthshire); Angel Recording (London); Hammerthorpe; Flowcreations; The Tower (Stockholm)
- Genre: Progressive death metal
- Length: 50:52
- Labels: Moderbolaget; Reigning Phoenix
- Producers: Mikael Åkerfeldt; Opeth; Stefan Boman; Dave Stewart

Opeth chronology
In Cauda Venenum (2019)	The Last Will and Testament (2024)

Singles from The Last Will and Testament
- 1. "§1" Released: 1 August 2024; 2. "§3" Released: 6 September 2024

Professional ratings
Aggregate scores
Source	Rating
Metacritic	84/100
Review scores
Source	Rating
AllMusic	4.5/5 stars
Blabbermouth.net	10/10
Kerrang!	3/5
Louder Sound	4/5 stars
Metal Injection	9/10
PopMatters	9/10
Rock Hard	10/10

The Last Will and Testament is the fourteenth studio album by Swedish progressive metal band Opeth. The album was originally set to be released on 11 October 2024 through Reigning Phoenix Music, but was pushed back to 22 November 2024 due to manufacturing delays. This is the band's first studio album since In Cauda Venenum (2019), and the first release with drummer Waltteri Väyrynen, who in 2022 officially replaced Martin Axenrot after his departure the year before. It also marks the return of death metal elements such as death growls not used since Watershed (2008). Ian Anderson of Jethro Tull appears on five tracks, contributing flute and spoken word.

== Concept ==
The album is a concept album set in the post-World War I era, telling the story of a wealthy, conservative patriarch, whose last will and testament reveals shocking family secrets.

Seven of the album's eight songs consist of the reading of the father's will in the presence of his three children, a twin pair of son and daughter in their 20s and a young, polio-ridden girl. Their father first confesses that the young girl is not related to the twins by blood. Instead, he claims she was born of an affair he had with a handmaiden of the house. Presented with a lie about an affair between the maid and an estranged father, the matriarch of the family agreed to take the girl in. She was subsequently brought up as a blood heir of the family, even after the matriarch's untimely passing. Following this revelation, the father discloses an even greater truth: unlike their sister, the twins are not his biological children at all. He explains that he and his wife had tried to conceive children of their own, but to no avail. Although he puts the blame on his wife's apparent infertility, the father agreed to try one of their servants as a sperm donor. The result of this was the twin pregnancy, which the father attributes to blind luck. As the young girl is his only child by blood, the father names her his heiress and proprietor of the family's legacy. Upon the twins he bestows worthless heirlooms as a reminder of the fragility of heritage, concluding the reading of the will. In the closing track "A Story Never Told", a letter written by her mother reaches the girl, years after her father's passing. It reveals that the mother had lied to the father, the girl was the result of a different affair and the patriarch was not her biological father, as he was sterile all along.

Except for the closing track, all song titles on this album consist solely of a section symbol (§) and a number from 1 to 7, rendered as Roman numerals (I to VII) on the physical variants. This was explained by frontman Mikael Åkerfeldt:

The lyrics are like the reading of the testament. That's why the songs don't have titles, just paragraph one... two... down to seven.

== Reception ==
The album received acclaim from critics and fans alike. It was praised as a return to form, akin to earlier efforts like Ghost Reveries and Watershed, while simultaneously expanding upon the prog-infused sound established in the band's recent catalogue, especially since Pale Communion. Ian Anderson's contributions were also singled out for praise.

== Artwork ==
The album's cover art, designed by Travis Smith, bears resemblance to The Shining's Overlook Hotel photo, which appears at the end of the film.

== Track listing ==
All tracks are written by Mikael Åkerfeldt.

The Last Will and Testament track listing
No.	Title	Length
1.	"§1"	5:56
2.	"§2"	5:33
3.	"§3"	5:10
4.	"§4"	7:00
5.	"§5"	7:29
6.	"§6"	6:03
7.	"§7"	6:30
8.	"A Story Never Told"	7:11
Total length:		50:52

== Personnel ==
=== Opeth ===
- Mikael Åkerfeldt – guitars, lead and backing vocals, cittra, Mellotrons, percussion & FX
- Fredrik Åkesson – guitars, backing vocals
- Joakim Svalberg – acoustic piano, Hammond organ, Mellotrons, Fender Rhodes & Moog, backing vocals and FX
- Martín Méndez – bass, backing vocals
- Waltteri Väyrynen – drums, percussion, backing vocals

=== Additional Personnel ===
- Ian Anderson – flute (§4, §7, A Story Never Told), spoken word (§1, §2, §4, and §7)
- Joey Tempest – backing vocals (§2)
- Mia Westlund – harp (§4)
- Mirjam Åkerfeldt – spoken word (§1)
- London Session Orchestra – strings
- Dave Stewart and Mikael Åkerfeldt – string arrangements

Technical personnel

- Stefan Boman, Joe Jones and Opeth – engineering
- Stefan Boman, Mikael Åkerfeldt and Opeth – mixing
- Miles Showell – mastering
- Kit Cunningham – drum technician
- Travis Smith – cover art
- Mikael Åkerfeldt – art direction
- Terhi Ylimäinen – photography
- Amanda Martinez & Independent Kostym – clothing
- Klara Rönnqvist Fors – dramatic consultation

== Charts ==
Chart performance for The Last Will and Testament
Chart (2024)	Peak position
Australian Albums (ARIA)	29
Austrian Albums (Ö3 Austria)	5
Belgian Albums (Ultratop Flanders)	22
Belgian Albums (Ultratop Wallonia)	51
Croatian International Albums (HDU)	10
Dutch Albums (Album Top 100)	12
Finnish Albums (Suomen virallinen lista)	4
French Albums (SNEP)	52
German Albums (Offizielle Top 100)	3
Greek Albums (IFPI)	44
Italian Albums (FIMI)	41
Japanese Albums (Oricon)	44
Japanese Hot Albums (Billboard Japan)	45
Norwegian Albums (VG-lista)	13
Polish Albums (ZPAV)	6
Portuguese Albums (AFP)	79
Scottish Albums (Official Charts)	7
Spanish Albums (Promusicae)	57
Swedish Albums (Sverigetopplistan)	4
Swiss Albums (Schweizer Hitparade)	3
UK Albums (Official Charts)	42
UK Independent Albums (Official Charts)	5
UK Rock & Metal Albums (Official Charts)	3
US Billboard 200	140
US Independent Albums (Billboard)	20
US Top Rock & Alternative Albums (Billboard)	28
