= Mikael Åkerfeldt =

Swedish musician (born 1974)

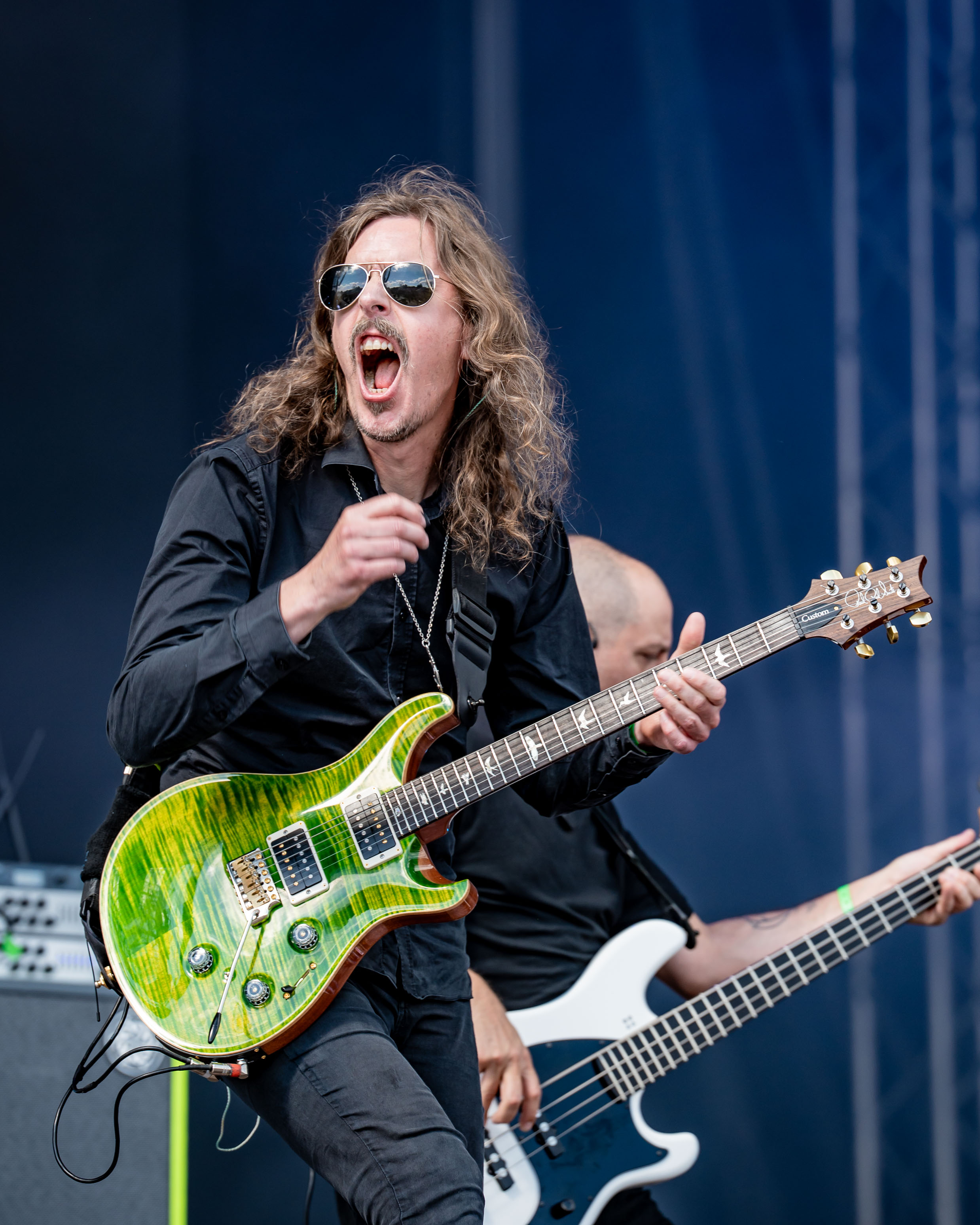
- Åkerfeldt with Opeth in 2024

Background information
- Born: 17 April 1974 (age 52); Stockholm, Sweden
- Genres: Progressive metal; progressive rock; death metal
- Occupations: Singer; songwriter; musician; record producer
- Instruments: Vocals; guitar
- Years active: 1987–present
- Member of: Opeth; Storm Corrosion
- Formerly of: Bloodbath; Katatonia
- Website: opeth.com

Lars Mikael Åkerfeldt (Swedish: [ˈmîːkaɛl ˈôːkɛrˌfɛlt]; born 17 April 1974) is a Swedish musician. He is the lead vocalist, guitarist, and primary songwriter for the progressive metal band Opeth. A former vocalist for the death metal supergroup Bloodbath, he was also the guitarist for the "one-off" band Steel, and a member of the collaboration Storm Corrosion with Steven Wilson.

Åkerfeldt is known for his progressive rock-influenced songwriting style and his frequent use of both clean baritone and growled vocals. He was ranked #42 on Guitar World's list of the 100 Greatest Heavy Metal Guitarists of All Time, and #11 among "The Top 25 Modern Metal Guitarists" on MetalSucks.

== Career ==
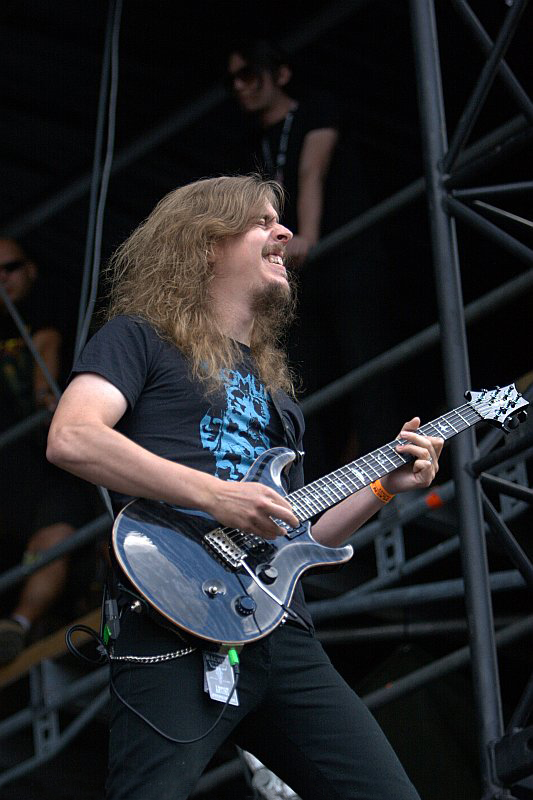
Åkerfeldt with Opeth at Wacken Open Air in 2006.

A native of Stockholm, Mikael Åkerfeldt was the vocalist for Eruption, a death metal band he formed in 1987 at the age of 13. After Eruption disbanded in 1989, he joined Opeth, initially as a keyboardist. When their original bassist left Opeth two years later, Åkerfeldt replaced him on bass, and Isberg then assumed guitar duties. When Isberg left Opeth three years later, Åkerfeldt took over as the lead vocalist.

Åkerfeldt performed the death vocals on Katatonia's album Brave Murder Day and their EP Sounds of Decay.

In September 2009, Åkerfeldt revealed he was contemplating recording a singer-songwriter acoustic solo album. However, in 2014, he expressed the view that he did not feel the need for a special solo project, noting that he could put pretty much anything into Opeth.

In an interview with STIM magazine, he revealed that one of the highlights of his career was Opeth's performance at the Royal Albert Hall.

In 2020, Åkerfeldt was approached by director Jonas Åkerlund to compose the soundtrack for the Swedish six-part Netflix series Clark, which was released in May 2022. This marked his first foray into film scoring.

== Artistry ==
Åkerfeldt's vocals are considered to be more intelligible than most death metal vocalists.

Åkerfeldt is a collector of obscure 1970s rock and heavy metal albums. He also draws influence from these obscure bands, making references to them in Opeth album titles such as Blackwater Park and My Arms, Your Hearse, as well as in songs like "Master's Apprentices" and "Goblin." He is also heavily influenced by jazz, the musician Ritchie Blackmore, Magma and its founder Christian Vander, and Hideki Ishima.

When asked about the album that "made him a metalhead," Åkerfeldt answered that it was probably The Number of the Beast by Iron Maiden, but he also mentioned Lick It Up by Kiss. In another interview, he stated that he usually cites Black Sabbath's Sabbath Bloody Sabbath as the best (and his favorite) heavy metal album of all time. He has also considered Judas Priest's Sad Wings of Destiny to be his favorite metal album.

== Personal life ==
On 15 August 2003, Mikael Åkerfeldt married his longtime girlfriend, Anna. In 2004, Anna gave birth to their first daughter, Melinda. The couple had their second daughter, Mirjam, in 2007. She delivered spoken words on track #1 of Opeth's 2024 album The Last Will and Testament. In 2016, Åkerfeldt revealed in an interview with The Quietus that he had gone through a divorce.

Åkerfeldt is known to be friends with Steven Wilson, the frontman of one of his favorite bands, Porcupine Tree, who also produced the Opeth albums Blackwater Park, Deliverance, and Damnation; Mike Portnoy, drummer of Dream Theater (Åkerfeldt is featured in their music video for "Wither" and delivered spoken words for their song "Repentance"); and Jonas Renkse of Katatonia. He is also presumed to be the basis for the character Toki Wartooth from the popular cartoon Metalocalypse, as revealed in an interview with Ultimate Guitar. Åkerfeldt does not practice any religion and considers himself an atheist.

== Equipment ==
Åkerfeldt has almost exclusively used PRS guitars since the Deliverance/Damnation era and has his own signature model. He also occasionally uses guitars by a variety of other brands, including Gibson and Jackson.

=== Electric guitars ===
Åkerfeldt uses the following electric guitars, according to the Opeth website.

1. PRS SE Mikael Åkerfeldt Signature Guitar
2. PRS P24 (Antique White)
3. PRS Custom 24 (Tortoiseshell flame top)
4. PRS Custom 24 (Blue Flame Top)
5. PRS Custom 24 (Black Quilt)
6. PRS Custom 24 (Black)
7. PRS SC 245 (Black Cherry)
8. PRS 22 fret Modern Eagle (Grey Flame Top)
9. PRS Modern Eagle Single Cut 24 Fret (Wine Flame Matte Top)
10. PRS Custom 22 12-String (Black)
11. PRS Singlecut (Black Quilt)
12. PRS Starla (Vintage Cherry)
13. Gibson Flying V ('67 Reissue)
14. Gibson Les Paul Standard V.O.S. (Tobacco Sunburst)
15. Gibson SG Standard 1961 Reissue
16. Fender Stratocaster 1975 (Black)
17. Fender Stratocaster 1972 Reissue (Natural)
18. Jackson RR USA Model
19. B.C. Rich Mockingbird (Black)

=== Acoustic guitars/Steel string ===
Åkerfeldt uses the following acoustic guitars, according to the Opeth website.

1. Martin (with Fishman Pickup)
2. Martin 00016GT
3. Takamine 12 String
4. Seagull (with Fishman Pickup)
5. Martin 000-28

=== Acoustic guitars/Classical nylon ===
1. Amalio Burguet 3am (cedar top)
2. Landola CT/2/w

=== Amps ===
Åkerfeldt uses the following amps, according to the Opeth website.

1. Marshall Vintage Modern 2466
2. Laney GH100L with cabinet
3. Laney VH100R
4. Laney VC30
5. Fender 1000 Rocpro
6. Fractal Audio Axe-FX Ultra preamp / effects processor
7. Marshall JCM900

=== Microphones ===
1. Shure

== Discography ==
=== With Opeth ===
- Orchid (1995)
- Morningrise (1996)
- My Arms, Your Hearse (1998)
- Still Life (1999)
- Blackwater Park (2001)
- Deliverance (2002)
- Damnation (2003)
- Lamentations (2003)
- Ghost Reveries (2005)
- The Roundhouse Tapes (2007)
- Watershed (2008)
- In Live Concert at the Royal Albert Hall (2010)
- Heritage (2011)
- Pale Communion (2014)
- Sorceress (2016)
- In Cauda Venenum (2019)
- The Last Will and Testament (2024)

=== With Katatonia ===
- Brave Murder Day (1996) – harsh vocals
- Sounds of Decay (1997) – harsh vocals
- Discouraged Ones (1998) – backing vocals, co-production on vocals
- Tonight's Decision (1999) – additional vocal production
- Brave Yester Days (2004) – harsh vocals (on disc 2: tracks 1–6), additional vocal production (on disc 2: tracks 6–9)
- The Black Sessions (2005) – backing vocals, co-vocal production

=== With Bloodbath ===
- Breeding Death (2000, EP)
- Resurrection Through Carnage (2002)
- The Wacken Carnage (2008, CD/DVD)
- Unblessing the Purity (2008, EP)
- The Fathomless Mastery (2008)
- Bloodbath over Bloodstock (2011, DVD)

=== With Steel ===
- Heavy Metal Machine (1998, EP)

=== With Storm Corrosion ===
- Storm Corrosion (2012)

=== As a Soloist/Composer ===
- Clark (Soundtrack From The Netflix Series) (2022, OST Album) (including clean jukebox-like fore-/background vocals from track 28)

== Appearances ==
- Ayreon: Åkerfeldt sings the parts of "Fear" in The Human Equation, the 2004 release.
- Candlemass: Åkerfeldt performs vocals for one song on the Candlemass 20-year anniversary DVD.
- Devin Townsend: Åkerfeldt appeared as a guest vocalist for Deconstruction. He sings on the song "Stand".
- Dream Theater: Åkerfeldt performs a spoken word part in "Repentance" on their 2007 album Systematic Chaos. He also sang the second verse of the same song on its first live performance, during the Progressive Nation 2008 tour. During the same tour, he also performed the growled part of the song "A Nightmare to Remember" with the band live.
- Edge of Sanity: Åkerfeldt provided vocals and guitar parts in Edge of Sanity's 1996 album Crimson, and also wrote lyrics for a song on Infernal.
- Ghost: Prequelle (2018) – acoustic guitar on the instrumental track "Helvetesfönster".
- Horrified: Åkerfeldt growls a few words on "Avatar of the Age of Horus" off of their Deus Diabolus Inversus album.
- Katatonia: Åkerfeldt sings on the 1996 album Brave Murder Day, and the three-song EP Sounds of Decay, released 1997. He also performs backing vocals on the album Discouraged Ones and was the vocal producer on Tonight's Decision.
- Ihsahn: Åkerfeldt performs on the song "Unhealer" from the 2008 album angL.
- OSI: Åkerfeldt performs lead vocals on the track "Stockholm" for OSI's 2009 album, Blood.
- Porcupine Tree: Åkerfeldt sings backing vocals on "Deadwing", "Lazarus", "Shesmovedon" and "Arriving Somewhere But Not Here" and plays a guitar solo on "Arriving Somewhere But Not Here" on the 2005 album Deadwing.
- Roadrunner United: Åkerfeldt performs vocals on the song "Roads" alongside Type O Negative keyboardist Josh Silver on the Roadrunner Records 25th Anniversary album Roadrunner United: The All-Star Sessions.
- Sigh: Åkerfeldt plays guitar on the track "Unputenpu" on the 2026 album Goh-Ka
- Soilwork: Åkerfeldt performs vocals on the title track of the album A Predator's Portrait.
- Steve Hackett: Genesis Revisited II (2012) – vocals on "Supper's Ready".
