= Watershed (Opeth album) =

Studio album by Opeth
- Released: 19 May 2008
- Recorded: 1 November 2007–10 January 2008
- Studios: Fascination Street Studios in Örebro, Sweden; Junkmail facilities (additional)
- Genres: Progressive rock; progressive metal; death metal
- Length: 54:56
- Label: Roadrunner
- Producers: Mikael Åkerfeldt; Jens Bogren

Opeth chronology
The Roundhouse Tapes (2007)	Watershed (2008)	The Candlelight Years (2008)

Alternative cover
- Special edition cover

Singles from Watershed
- 1. "Porcelain Heart" Released: 19 April 2008; 2. "Burden" Released: 9 December 2008

Watershed is the ninth studio album by Swedish progressive metal band Opeth. Released by Roadrunner Records, Watershed is the first studio album by Opeth to feature guitarist Fredrik Åkesson and drummer Martin Axenrot, who replaced longtime guitarist Peter Lindgren and drummer Martin Lopez. The artwork for the album was made by Travis Smith (who has created the artwork for eight previous Opeth releases) in collaboration with Mikael Åkerfeldt. It was the band's last studio album to contain death growls or any death metal elements until 2024's The Last Will and Testament.

== Overview ==
On opening track "Coil", Mikael Åkerfeldt duets with Nathalie Lorichs, who was dating drummer Martin Axenrot at the time. The band has revealed that they were initially going to start the album with what eventually became the second track, "Heir Apparent"; however, they preferred "Coil" as an introductory track for its contrast to "Heir Apparent".

Åkerfeldt was inspired to write the single "Burden" while listening to the Scorpions song "Living And Dying" during a stay in Turkey.

== Reception ==
Professional ratings
Aggregate scores
Source	Rating
Metacritic	82/100
Review scores
Source	Rating
AllMusic	4/5 stars
Blender	4/5 stars
Blabbermouth.net	9.5/10
Consequence of Sound	A−
The New York Times	4/5 stars
Pitchfork	7.5/10
PopMatters	9/10
Q	4/5 stars
Rock Hard	9/10
Sputnikmusic	4/5 stars

The album was met with universal acclaim according to Metacritic, receiving a metascore of 82/100 based on 10 critics.

On Metal Hammer's Critic's Choice Top 50, Watershed was named as the second-best album of 2008 (behind only Metallica's Death Magnetic). In the January/February 2009 issue of Metal Edge, Watershed was voted the number 1 album of 2008.

In a fan club interview dated to November 2008, a few months after the album's release, former guitarist Peter Lindgren praised the album, noting that "it was a weird feeling to get a new Opeth CD...that he hadn't been a part of", and that he "had trouble following the new songs at first", but called it "damn good".

== Release history ==
Watershed was released as a standard edition, a 180 gram vinyl edition, and a special edition. The special edition includes three bonus tracks, a bonus DVD with a 5.1 surround sound mix of the entire album (not including bonus tracks), video content featuring rehearsals, and studio footage, as well as expanded artwork. The vinyl release comes in gatefold packaging and contains the album on two LPs, as well as a CD copy of the album (both including the bonus track "Derelict Herds") and a poster.

"Mellotron Heart" was included on a separate disc with a limited number of copies of the album. It is an alternate recording of the song "Porcelain Heart", performed on mellotron and mini-Moog synthesizers by Åkerfeldt himself. The cover for the CD is the standard album artwork with the figure and writing desk replaced by a mellotron. The track is also available as a free digital download exclusively for those who pre-ordered the album from The End Records, and to people who insert the CD into their computer via Opendisc.

=== By region ===
Region	Date	Label	Format	Catalog
Continental Europe	30 May 2008	Roadrunner	CD	RR 7962-2
United Kingdom	2 June 2008	Roadrunner	CD	RR 7962-2
North America	3 June 2008	Roadrunner	Enhanced CD	R 1384409
Australia	3 June 2008	Roadrunner Records (Australia)	Enhanced CD	RR 7962-8

== Track listing ==
All lyrics are written by Mikael Åkerfeldt; all music is composed by Åkerfeldt except where noted.

No.	Title	Music	Length
1.	"Coil"		3:10
2.	"Heir Apparent"		8:50
3.	"The Lotus Eater"		8:50
4.	"Burden"		7:41
5.	"Porcelain Heart"	Åkerfeldt; Fredrik Åkesson	8:00
6.	"Hessian Peel"		11:25
7.	"Hex Omega"		7:00
Total length:			54:56

Special edition
No.	Title	Writer(s)	Length
8.	"Derelict Herds"	Åkerfeldt; Per Wiberg	6:28
9.	"Bridge of Sighs" (Robin Trower cover)	Robin Trower	5:55
10.	"Den ständiga resan" (Marie Fredriksson cover)	Marie Fredriksson	4:09
Total length:			71:28

Special edition bonus DVD
No.	Title	Length
1.	"Prologue"	6:58
2.	"From Another Planet"	8:30
3.	"The Lotus Eater"	13:48
4.	"The Junkmail Studios"	16:23
5.	"Epilogue"	6:41
Total length:		52:20

== Personnel ==
=== Opeth ===
- Mikael Åkerfeldt – vocals, guitar
- Fredrik Åkesson – guitar
- Per Wiberg – keyboards, synthesizer
- Martín Méndez – bass guitar
- Martin Axenrot – drums

=== Additional musicians ===
- Nathalie Lorichs – female vocals (on "Coil")
- Lisa Almberg – English horn, oboe
- Christoffer Wadensten – flute
- Karin Svensson – violin
- Andreas Tengberg – cello

=== Production and design ===
- Mikael Åkerfeldt – production, artwork
- Jens Bogren – production, recording, mixing, mastering
- Mikhail Korge – recording (additional)
- David Castillo – engineering (additional)
- Johan Örnborg – engineering (additional)
- Travis Smith – artwork

== Usage in media ==
- The song "Heir Apparent" was featured as a downloadable content in the video game Rock Band 4.
- The song "The Lotus Eater" was featured in the 2011 video game Saints Row: The Third.

== Chart positions ==
=== Weekly ===
Chart (2008)	Peak position
Australian Albums (ARIA)	7
Austrian Albums (Ö3 Austria)	53
Belgian Albums (Ultratop Flanders)	90
Canadian Albums (Billboard)	17
Danish Albums (Hitlisten)	84
Dutch Albums (Album Top 100)	14
Finnish Albums (Suomen virallinen lista)	1
French Albums (SNEP)	47
German Albums (Offizielle Top 100)	23
Hungarian Albums (MAHASZ)	37
Irish Albums (IRMA)	59
Italian Albums (FIMI)	37
Japanese Albums (Oricon)	15
New Zealand Albums (RMNZ)	26
Norwegian Albums (VG-lista)	7
Polish Albums (ZPAV)	35
Scottish Albums Chart (OCC)	37
Swedish Albums (Sverigetopplistan)	7
Swiss Albums (Schweizer Hitparade)	24
UK Albums Chart	34
UK Rock & Metal Albums (Official Charts)	2
US Billboard 200	23

=== Monthly ===
Chart (2008)	Peak position
Poland (ZPAV Top 100)	38
