= Opeth =

Swedish progressive metal band

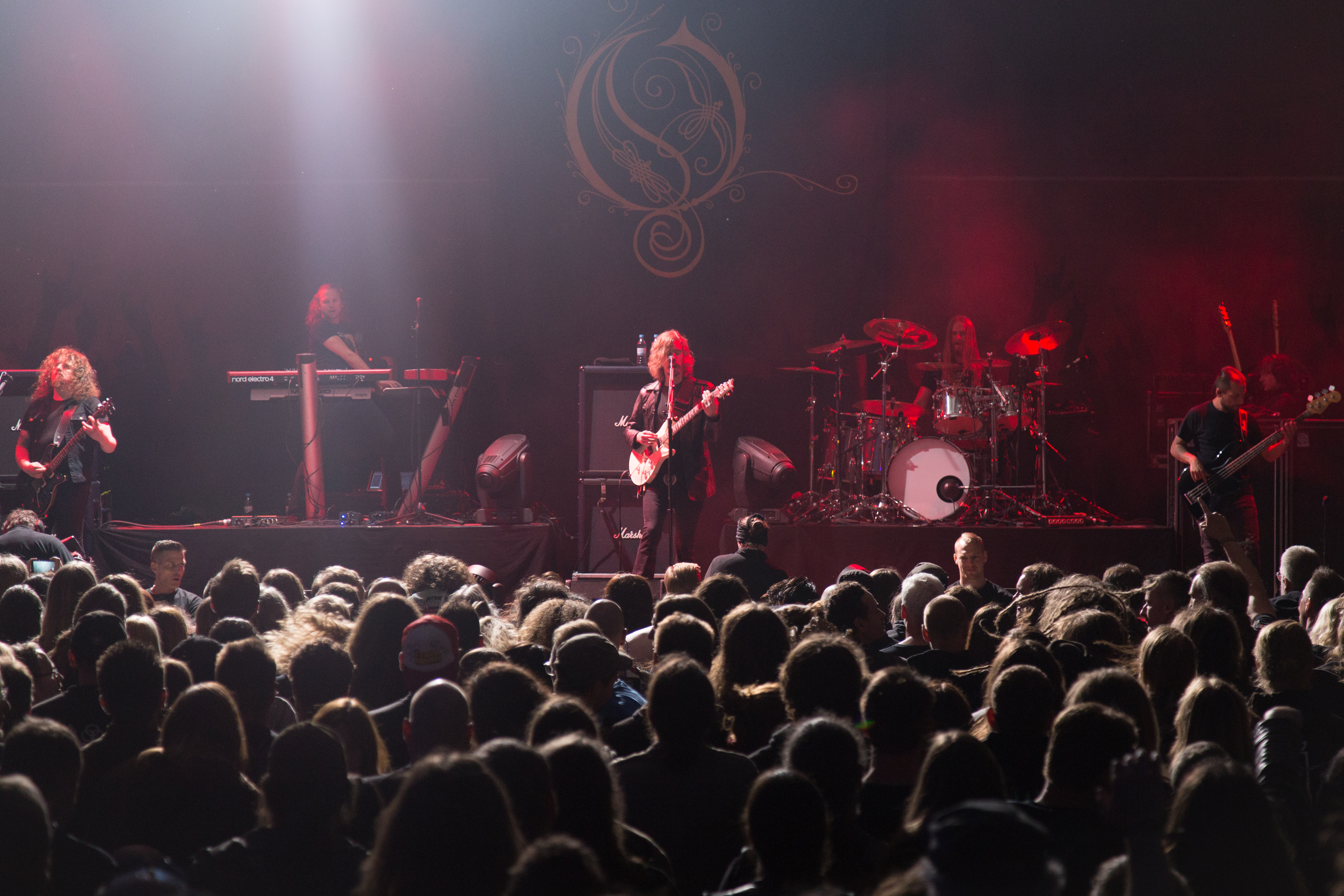
- Opeth at Rock Hard Festival 2017, Germany (L–R): Fredrik Åkesson, Joakim Svalberg, Mikael Åkerfeldt, Martin Axenrot, & Martín Méndez

Background information
- Origin: Stockholm, Sweden
- Genres: Progressive metal; progressive rock; death metal
- Works: Discography
- Years active: 1990–present
- Labels: Moderbolaget; Nuclear Blast; Candlelight; Century Black; Peaceville; Music For Nations; Koch; Roadrunner; Atomic Fire
- Members: Mikael Åkerfeldt; Martín Méndez; Fredrik Åkesson; Joakim Svalberg; Waltteri Väyrynen
- Past members: List of Opeth band members
- Website: opeth.com

Opeth is a Swedish progressive metal band from Stockholm, formed in 1990. The band incorporates folk, blues, classical, and jazz elements into its usually lengthy compositions, as well as strong influences from death metal, especially in their early works. Most songs and compositions include acoustic guitar passages, Mellotrons, death growls, and strong dynamic shifts.

The band has been through multiple personnel changes since early in their history, including the replacement of every original member. Lead vocalist, guitarist and primary songwriter Mikael Åkerfeldt has been Opeth's driving force since the departure of founder and lead vocalist David Isberg in 1992. The group rarely made live appearances supporting their first four albums, but since their first world tour in support of the 2001 album Blackwater Park, they have performed several other major world tours.

Opeth have released fourteen studio albums, four live DVDs, four live albums (three that are in conjunction with DVDs), and two boxsets. The band released its debut album Orchid in 1995. With their eighth studio album, Ghost Reveries (2005), the band achieved chart success in several dozen countries, including Top Ten in Sweden. Their ninth studio album, Watershed (2008), topped the Finnish albums chart in its first week of release, and reached 23 on the US Billboard 200 chart. As of November 2009, the band have sold over 1.5 million copies of their albums and DVDs worldwide, including 300,000 collective SoundScans of their albums Blackwater Park, Damnation, and Deliverance in the United States. Their 14th studio album The Last Will and Testament (2024) won the Swedish Grammis award for the Best Hard Rock/Metal category.

== History ==
=== Formation (1990–1993) ===
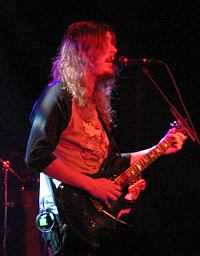
Åkerfeldt (pictured) and Isberg carried on with Opeth after all other members left.

Opeth was formed as a death metal band in April 1990 in Stockholm, Sweden, by David Isberg, with some friends from Täby; Isberg was the lead vocalist. The band name was taken from the Wilbur Smith novel The Sunbird, in which Opet is the name of a fictional city. Isberg asked former Eruption band member and guitarist Mikael Åkerfeldt to join Opeth as a bassist, replacing Martin Persson. When Åkerfeldt showed up to practice on the day after Isberg invited him, it became clear that Isberg had not told the band members, including the band's current bassist, that Åkerfeldt would be joining the band. An ensuing argument led to all members but Isberg and Åkerfeldt leaving to form a new project. At this time Opeth declared themselves to be the "most evil band in the world".

Isberg and Åkerfeldt recruited drummer Anders Nordin, bassist Nick Döring, and guitarist Andreas Dimeo. Unsatisfied with Opeth's slow progress, Döring and Dimeo left the band after their first performance, and were replaced by guitarist Kim Pettersson and bassist Johan De Farfalla. After the next show, De Farfalla left Opeth to spend time with his girlfriend in Germany, and was initially replaced by Mattias Ander, before Åkerfeldt's friend Peter Lindgren took on the role of bassist. Rhythm guitarist Kim Pettersson left following the band's next performance, and Lindgren switched to guitar, with Stefan Guteklint taking over the role of bassist. In 1992, David Isberg left the band citing "creative differences".

Following Isberg's departure, Åkerfeldt took over vocal duties and he, Lindgren, and Nordin spent the next year writing and rehearsing new material. The group began to rely less on the blast beats and aggression typical of death metal, and incorporated acoustic guitars and guitar harmonies into their music; developing the core sound of Opeth. Bassist Guteklint was dismissed by the band after they signed their first record deal with Candlelight Records in 1994. Opeth initially employed former member De Farfalla as a session bassist for their demo recordings, and he went on to join on a full-time basis following the release of Opeth's debut album, "Orchid", in 1995.

=== Orchid, Morningrise, and My Arms, Your Hearse (1994–1998) ===
"In Mist She Was Standing"
"In Mist She Was Standing", from Orchid. This clip highlights the twin harmony guitar style featured on the band's early releases.

Opeth recorded its debut album, Orchid, with producer Dan Swanö in April 1994. Because of distribution problems with the newly formed Candlelight Records, the album was not released until 15 May 1995, and only in Europe. Orchid tested the boundaries of traditional death metal, featuring acoustic guitars, piano, and clean vocals.

After a few live shows in the United Kingdom, Opeth returned to the studio in March 1996 to begin work on a second album, again produced by Dan Swanö. The album, titled Morningrise, was released in Europe on 24 June 1996. With only five songs, but lasting 66 minutes, it features Opeth's longest song, the 20-minute "Black Rose Immortal". Opeth toured the UK in support of Morningrise, followed by a 26-date Scandinavian tour with Cradle of Filth. While on tour, Opeth attracted the attention of Century Media Records, who signed the band and released the first two albums in the United States in 1997.

In 1997, after the tour, Åkerfeldt and Lindgren dismissed De Farfalla for personal reasons, without the consent of Nordin. When Åkerfeldt informed Nordin, who was on a vacation in Brazil, Nordin left the band and remained in Brazil for personal reasons. Former Eternal members, drummer Martin Lopez (formerly of Amon Amarth) and bassist Martín Méndez, responded to an ad at a music shop placed by Åkerfeldt. López and Méndez were fans of the band and took the ads down themselves so no other musicians could apply for the job. Åkerfeldt and Lindgren did not want the Martins to join at first, due to them already knowing each other; they felt that they wanted two strangers so that there wouldn't be two camps in the band, but eventually hired both. López made his debut with Opeth playing on a cover version of Iron Maiden's "Remember Tomorrow", which was included on the album A Call to Irons: A Tribute to Iron Maiden.

With a larger recording budget from Century Media, Opeth began work on its third album, with noted Swedish producer Fredrik Nordström, at Studio Fredman in August 1997. Although Opeth had Méndez, due to time constraints Åkerfeldt played bass on the album. My Arms, Your Hearse was released to critical acclaim on 18 August 1998.

=== Still Life and Blackwater Park (1999–2001) ===
"Bleak"
"Bleak" from Blackwater Park. This clip features an acoustic breakdown, followed by a dynamic shift into distorted guitars, a common trait for the band.

In 1999, the ownership of Candlelight Records changed hands, as owner and friend of the band Lee Barrett left the company. Opeth signed with UK label Peaceville Records in Europe, which was distributed by Music For Nations. Opeth reserved time at Studio Fredman to begin work on its next album, but recording was postponed while the studio was relocated. Due to time constraints, the band was able to rehearse only twice before entering the studio. Delays with the album's artwork pushed the release back an additional month and Still Life was released on 18 October 1999. Due to problems with the band's new distribution network, the album was not released in the United States until February 2001. Still Life was the first album recorded with Méndez, and also the first Opeth album to bear any kind of caption on the front cover upon its initial release, including the band's logo. Allmusic called Still Life a "formidable splicing of harsh, often jagged guitar riffs with graceful melodies." As explained by Åkerfeldt, Still Life is a concept album: "The main character is kind of banished from his hometown because he hasn't got the same faith as the rest of the inhabitants there. The album pretty much starts off when he is returning after several years to hook up with his old 'babe.' The big bosses of the town know that he's back... A lot of bad things start happening."

Following a few live dates in Europe, Opeth returned to Studio Fredman to begin work on its next album, with Porcupine Tree's Steven Wilson producing. The band sought to recreate the recording experience of Still Life, and again entered the studio with minimal rehearsals, and no lyrics written. "This time it was tough," Åkerfeldt said, "I feel pleasantly blown away by the immense result, though. It was indeed worth the effort." Wilson also pushed the band to expand its sound, incorporating new sounds and production techniques. "Steve guided us into the realms of 'strange' noises for guitars and voice", Åkerfeldt said.

Opeth released its fifth studio album, Blackwater Park, on 21 February 2001. AllMusic has stated that the album "keeps with Opeth's tradition by transcending the limits of death/black metal and repeatedly shattering the foundations of conventional songwriting". In support of Blackwater Park, Opeth embarked on its first world tour, headlined Europe for the first time, and made an appearance at the 2001 Wacken Open Air festival in Germany, playing to a crowd of 60,000.

=== Deliverance and Damnation (2002–2004) ===
"Deliverance"
"Deliverance" from the album of the same name. The song is nearly 14 minutes long, which is not uncommon for an Opeth song. The clip features Åkerfeldt's growling vocal style.

Opeth returned to Sweden after touring in support of Blackwater Park, and began writing for the next album. At first, Åkerfeldt had trouble putting together new material: "I wanted to write something heavier than we'd ever done, still I had all these great mellow parts and arrangements which I didn't want to go to waste." Jonas Renkse of Katatonia, a long-time friend of Åkerfeldt, suggested writing music for two separate albums—one heavy and one soft.

Excited at the prospect, Åkerfeldt agreed without consulting his bandmates or record label. While his bandmates liked the idea of recording two separate albums, Åkerfeldt had to convince the label: "I had to lie somewhat ... saying that we could do this recording very soon, it won't cost more than a regular single album." With most of the material written, the band rehearsed just once before entering Nacksving Studios in 2002, and again with producer Steven Wilson in Studio Fredman. Under pressure to complete both albums simultaneously, Åkerfeldt said the recording process was "the toughest test of our history." After recording basic tracks, the band moved production to England to first mix the heavy album, Deliverance, with Andy Sneap at Backstage Studios. "Deliverance was so poorly recorded, without any organisation whatsoever," Åkerfeldt claimed, that Sneap "is credited as a 'saviour' in the sleeve, as he surely saved much of the recording."

Deliverance was released on 4 November 2002, and debuted at number 19 on the US Top Independent Albums chart, marking the band's first US chart appearance. AllMusic stated, "Deliverance is altogether more subtle than any of its predecessors, approaching listeners with haunting nuances and masterful dynamics rather than overwhelming them with sheer mass and complexity."

Opeth performed a one-off concert in Stockholm, then returned to the UK to finish recording vocals for the second of the two albums, Damnation, at Steven Wilson's No Man's Land Studios. Although Åkerfeldt believed the band could not finish both albums, Opeth completed Deliverance and Damnation in just seven weeks of studio time, which was the same amount spent on Blackwater Park alone. Damnation was released on 14 April 2003, and garnered the band its first appearance on the US Billboard 200 at number 192. The album also won the 2003 Swedish Grammy Award for Best Hard Rock Performance. On 1 January 2016, Opeth re-released both Deliverance and Damnation in one package, containing CD and DVD versions, along with new mixing.

The band embarked on its biggest tour yet, playing nearly 200 shows in 2003 and 2004. Opeth performed three special shows in Europe with two song lists each—one acoustic set and one heavy set. The band recorded its first DVD, Lamentations (Live at Shepherd's Bush Empire 2003), at Shepherd's Bush Empire in London, England. The DVD features a two-hour performance, including the entire Damnation album, several songs from Deliverance and Blackwater Park, and a one-hour documentary about the recording of Deliverance and Damnation. Lamentations was certified Gold (over 50,000 sales) by the Canadian Recording Industry Association.

Opeth was scheduled to perform in Jordan but before the band left for the country, drummer Lopez called Åkerfeldt stating he was having an anxiety attack and could not perform, forcing the band to cancel the show. In early 2004, Lopez was sent home from Canada after more anxiety attacks on tour. Opeth decided against cancelling the remainder of the tour, with Lopez's drum technician filling in for two concerts. Lopez promised that he would return to the tour as soon as he could, but two shows later Opeth asked Strapping Young Lad drummer Gene Hoglan to fill in. Lopez returned to Opeth for the Seattle show on the final leg of the Deliverance and Damnation tour.

=== Ghost Reveries (2005–2007) ===
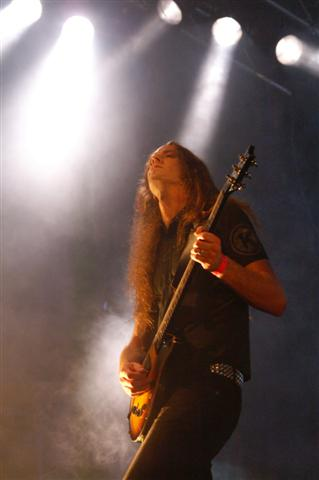
Peter Lindgren left Opeth in 2007 after sixteen years with the band.

Opeth returned home in 2004 to start writing new material for its eighth album; by the end of the year, they had finished writing it. European label, Music For Nations, closed its doors in 2005, and after negotiations with various labels, the band signed with Roadrunner Records. Åkerfeldt said the primary reason for signing with Roadrunner was the label's wide distribution, ensuring the album would be available at larger-chain retailers. When news leaked that the band was signed to Roadrunner, who predominantly worked with trend-oriented rock and metal, some fans accused the band of selling out. "To be honest," Åkerfeldt said, "that's such an insult after 15 years as a band and 8 records. I can't believe we haven't earned each and every Opeth fan's credibility after all these years. I mean, our songs are 10 minutes long!" The band rehearsed for three weeks before entering the studio, the first time the band rehearsed since the 1998 album, My Arms, Your Hearse. During rehearsal, keyboardist Wiberg joined Opeth as a full-time member after touring with the band on keyboards for more than a year. Opeth recorded at Fascination Street Studios in Örebro, Sweden, from 18 March to 1 June 2005, and released the resulting Ghost Reveries on 30 August 2005, to critical acclaim and commercial success. The album debuted at number 64 in the US, and number nine in Sweden, higher than any previous Opeth release. Keith Bergman of Blabbermouth.net gave the album ten out of ten, one of only 21 albums to achieve a perfect rating from the site. Rod Smith of Decibel magazine called Ghost Reveries "achingly beautiful, sometimes unabashedly brutal, often a combination of both".

On 12 May 2006, Martin Lopez announced that he had officially parted ways with Opeth due to health problems, and was replaced by Martin Axenrot. Opeth toured on the main stage of Gigantour in 2006, alongside Megadeth. Ghost Reveries was re-released on 31 October 2006, with a bonus cover song (Deep Purple's "Soldier of Fortune"), a DVD featuring a 5.1 surround sound mix of the album and a documentary on the making of the record. A recording of Opeth's live performance at the Camden Roundhouse, in London, on 9 November 2006, was released as the double live album The Roundhouse Tapes, which topped the Finnish DVD chart.

On 17 May 2007, Peter Lindgren announced he would be leaving Opeth after 16 years. "The decision has been the toughest I've ever made but it is the right one to make at this point in my life," Lindgren said. "I feel that I simply have lost some of the enthusiasm and inspiration needed to participate in a band that has grown from a few guys playing the music we love to a worldwide industry." Ex-Arch Enemy guitarist Fredrik Åkesson replaced Lindgren, as Åkerfeldt explained "Fredrik was the only name that popped up thinking about a replacement for Peter. In my opinion he's one of the top three guitar players out of Sweden. We all get along great as we've known each other for maybe four years and he already has the experience to take on the circus-like lifestyle we lead as members of Opeth."

=== Watershed and In Live Concert at the Royal Albert Hall (2008–2010) ===
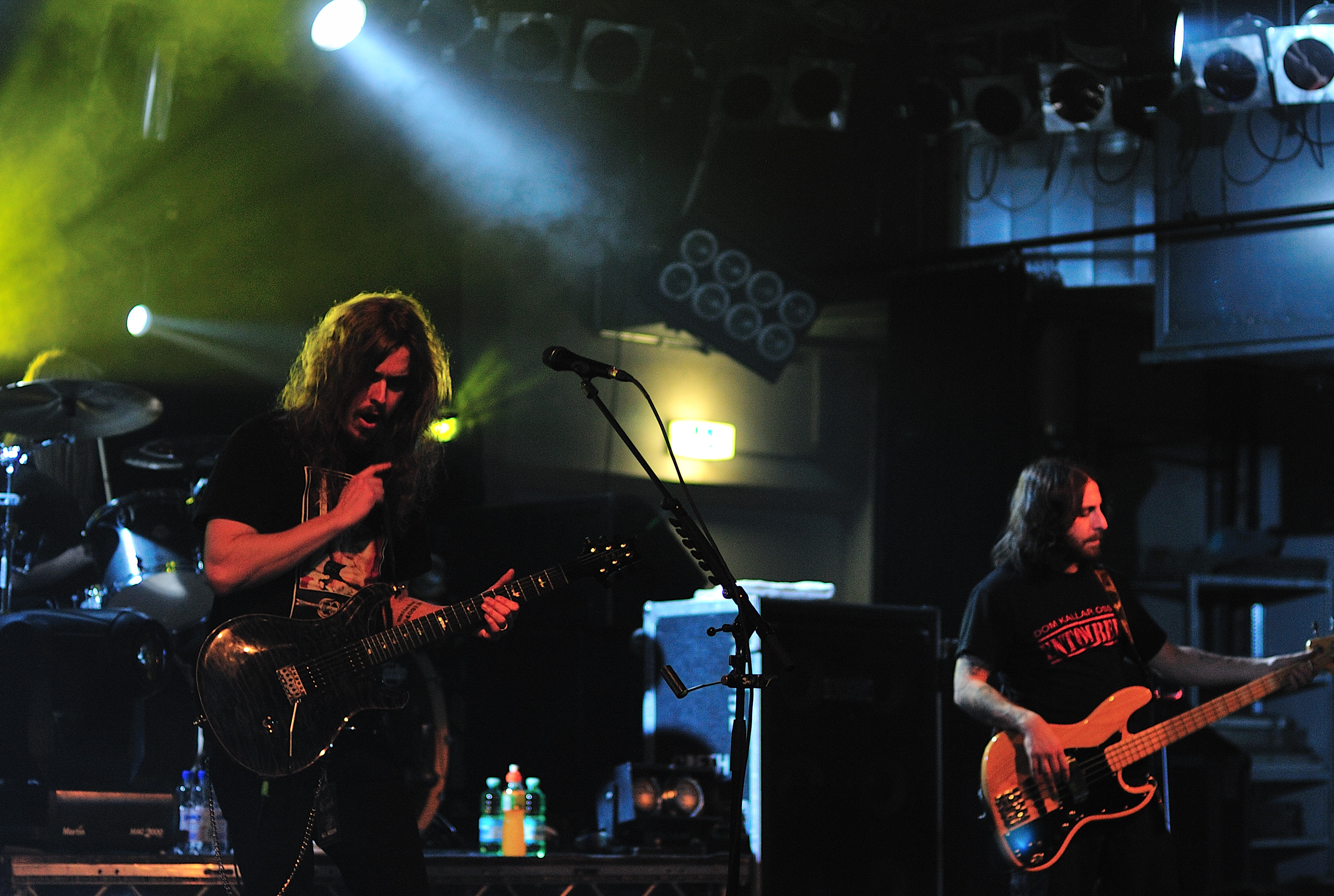
Mikael Åkerfeldt and Martín Méndez live in 2008

Opeth entered Fascination Street Studios in November 2007 to record their ninth studio album, with Åkerfeldt producing. By January 2008, Opeth had recorded 13 songs, including three cover songs. The finished album, Watershed, features seven tracks, with cover songs used as bonus tracks on different versions of the album. Watershed was released on 3 June 2008. Åkerfeldt described the songs on the album as "a bit more energetic". Opeth toured in support of Watershed, including headlining the UK Defenders of the Faith tour with Arch Enemy, an appearance at Wacken Open Air, and the Progressive Nation tour with headliner Dream Theater. Watershed was Opeth's highest-charting album to date, debuting at number 23 on the US Billboard 200, on the Australian ARIA album charts at number seven and at number one on Finland's official album chart. Opeth went on a worldwide tour in support of Watershed. In 2008, they played the UK Bloodstock festival alongside Dimmu Borgir. From September to October, the band toured North America backed by High on Fire, Baroness, and Nachtmystium. They returned to tour Europe for the rest of the year with Cynic and The Ocean.

In 2010, Opeth wrote and recorded the new track, "The Throat of Winter", which appeared on the digital EP soundtrack of the video game, God of War III. Åkerfeldt described the song as "odd" and "not very metal." To celebrate their 20th anniversary, Opeth performed a six-show, worldwide tour called Evolution XX: An Opeth Anthology, from 30 March through 9 April 2010. Blackwater Park was performed in its entirety, along with several songs never before performed. The concert of 5 April 2010, at the Royal Albert Hall in London, England was filmed for a DVD and live album package titled In Live Concert at the Royal Albert Hall. The set was released on 21 September 2010, in 2-DVD and 2-DVD/3-CD configurations. For the DVD the concert was split into two sets. The first set consists of the entire Blackwater Park album, while the second set contains one song from every album excluding Blackwater Park, in chronological order representing the twenty years of "evolution" in their music. Åkerfeldt stated, "I can't believe it, but, fuck, we're celebrating 20 years. I've been in this band ever since I was 16. It's insane." A special edition of Blackwater Park was released in March 2010 to coincide with the tour.

=== Heritage (2011–2013) ===
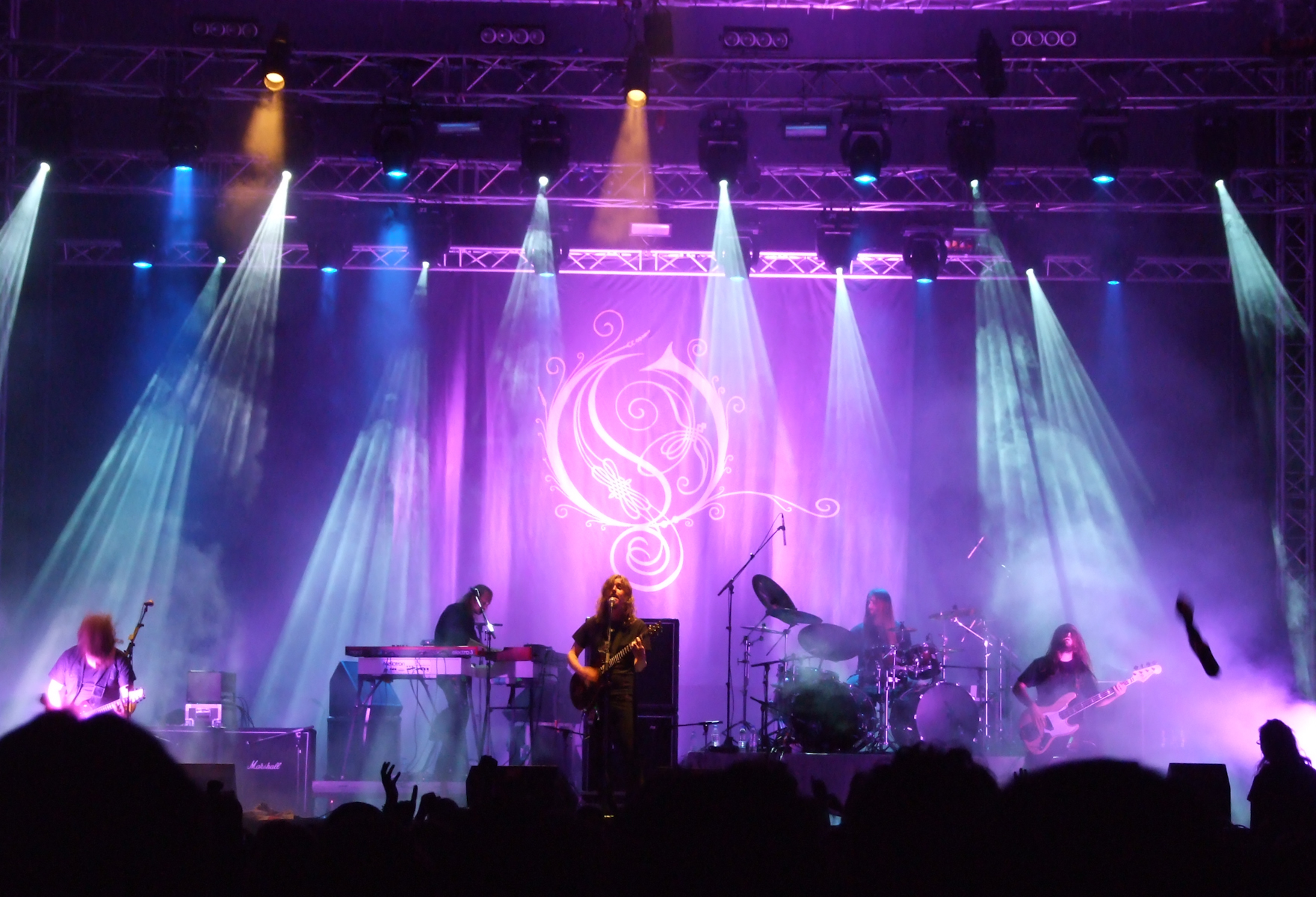
Opeth at Kavarna Rock Fest 2011

In September 2010, Mikael Åkerfeldt stated that he was writing for a new Opeth album. The band announced on their website that they would start recording their tenth album on 31 January 2011, at the Atlantis/Metronome studios in Stockholm, once again with Jens Bogren (engineering) and Steven Wilson from Porcupine Tree as co-producer. Shortly after mixing was complete on the new album in April 2011, Per Wiberg left the band. Åkerfeldt said the band, "came to the decision that we should find a replacement for Per right after the recordings of the new album, and this came as no surprise to Per. He had, in turn, been thinking about leaving, so you could say it was a mutual decision. There's no bad blood, just a relationship that came to an end, and that's that."

Opeth's tenth album, Heritage, was released on 14 September 2011, to generally favorable reviews. The album sold 19,000 copies in the United States in its first week of release and debuted at number 19 on the Billboard 200 chart. Heritage debuted at number four in the band's native country of Sweden. Heritage became the second Opeth album to not feature any death growls and had a much more progressive style than their previous albums, a direction that Åkerfeldt was already interested in pursuing with Opeth.

The first two songs Åkerfeldt wrote for Heritage were in the style of Watershed. After hearing the songs for the first time, Martín Méndez told Åkerfeldt that he would be disappointed if the album continued in that direction. Relieved that Méndez was not interested in doing another conventional Opeth album, Åkerfeldt scrapped the two songs and started the writing process over in a different style. In the press release for Heritage, Mikael Åkerfeldt revealed that he felt as though he had been building to write the album since he was 19 years old. In a review for Allmusic, Thom Jurek called Heritage the band's most adventurous album, describing the songs as "drenched in instrumental interludes, knotty key and chord changes, shifting time signatures, clean vocals, and a keyboard-heavy instrumentation that includes Mellotrons, Rhodes pianos, and Hammond organs".

Opeth supported Heritage with a tour that would last for over 200 tour dates. The tour was the band's first with new keyboardist, Joakim Svalberg, who played on the opening track of the album. During the tour, Opeth played with bands such as Katatonia, Pain of Salvation, Mastodon, Ghost and Anathema all over the world in countries such as the United States, Europe, Turkey, India, Japan, Greece, Israel, Latin America and Sweden. The tour concluded with "Melloboat 2013".

=== Pale Communion (2014–2015) ===
On 26 August 2014, Opeth released its eleventh studio album, titled Pale Communion. Åkerfeldt began working on new material as far back as August 2012. In January 2014 he stated, "We've been looking at [tracking the next album at] Rockfield Studios in Wales where Queen recorded "Bohemian Rhapsody", but we haven't made a decision yet, but it will be an expensive album. There's a lot going on, lots of string arrangements that we haven't had in the past." Despite fearing that the band's new musical direction would split Opeth's fanbase, when asked if it will it be heavier or softer than Heritage, Åkerfeldt said, "Maybe a little bit heavier, not death metal heavy, but hard rock/heavy metal heavy. There's also lots of progressive elements and acoustic guitars, but also more sinister-sounding riffs." Åkerfeldt also produced the new album which will include string instrumentation, something that he became interested in doing when working on Storm Corrosion. The band members in Opeth felt rejuvenated after creating Heritage which resulted in closer relationships between them.

The Guardian reviewed Pale Communion positively, calling it "strange, intricate prog-metal genius" somewhat flawed by Åkerfeldt's indulgent vocal styling. The album saw Opeth's highest chart positions in the history of the band with Pale Communion debuting at number 19 in the US, number 3 in Sweden, and number 14 in the United Kingdom. It sold 13,000 copies in its first week of release in the US.

Pale Communion was supported with more touring from Opeth. In 2015, Opeth played several concerts to celebrate the 25th anniversary of the band. At these special shows, the band was doing two sets. The first set is 2005's Ghost Reveries as a ten-year anniversary celebration of the album. The second set spanned the rest of the band's career, celebrating their 25th anniversary. Åkerfeldt expressed excitement for the concerts.

=== Sorceress, Garden of the Titans and In Cauda Venenum (2016–2020) ===
On 15 June 2016, Nuclear Blast Entertainment announced the signing of Opeth. Three days later, on 18 June, Opeth released a 30-second teaser for their new album, Sorceress. A month later, on 18 July, the band confirmed the album would be released on 30 September, in addition to revealing the artwork and track list. Mikael Åkerfeldt described it as, "A fine little record. My favorite in our discography right now. Of course. That's how it should be, right? It's both fresh and old, both progressive and rehashed. Heavy and calm. Just the way we like it." The album was the first project under Moderbolaget Records, a joint venture between Opeth and Nuclear Blast. Moderbolaget means "the parent company" in Swedish.

On 25 July 2016, in the build up towards the album release, the band posted the first Sorceress: Studio Report on their YouTube channel. In the behind-the-scenes studio tour, it is confirmed that the band had returned to Rockfield Studios where they previously recorded Pale Communion. At the end of the video, there is a 20-second excerpt of a track believed to be from the album featuring heavily down-tuned guitars. On 1 August 2016, the band released a lyric video for the title-track 'Sorceress' on their YouTube channel. On 5 September 2016, Opeth released a lyric video for the second single titled 'Will O the Wisp,' again through their YouTube channel and website Opeth's video for "Era" was nominated for "Video of the Year" at the 2017 Progressive Music Awards, where they ultimately won "International Band of the Year".

On 2 October 2017, Åkerfeldt said he has been thinking about doing something "twisted" and different for the next studio album, which could be released by mid-to-late 2019. On 20 November 2017, guitarist Fredrik Åkesson stated that the band will not have any gigs in the upcoming months, until the 2018 summer festivals. During this break the band will focus on writing songs for the new album. On 11 July 2018, during an interview with FaceCulture, Åkesson said "I've recorded a lot of solos so far. And Mikael Åkerfeldt has almost already written 12 songs for the new album, so we have more material than enough for an album". On 22 May 2019, the band announced their thirteenth studio album, In Cauda Venenum, due for release on 27 September 2019.

=== Lineup changes and The Last Will and Testament (2021–present) ===
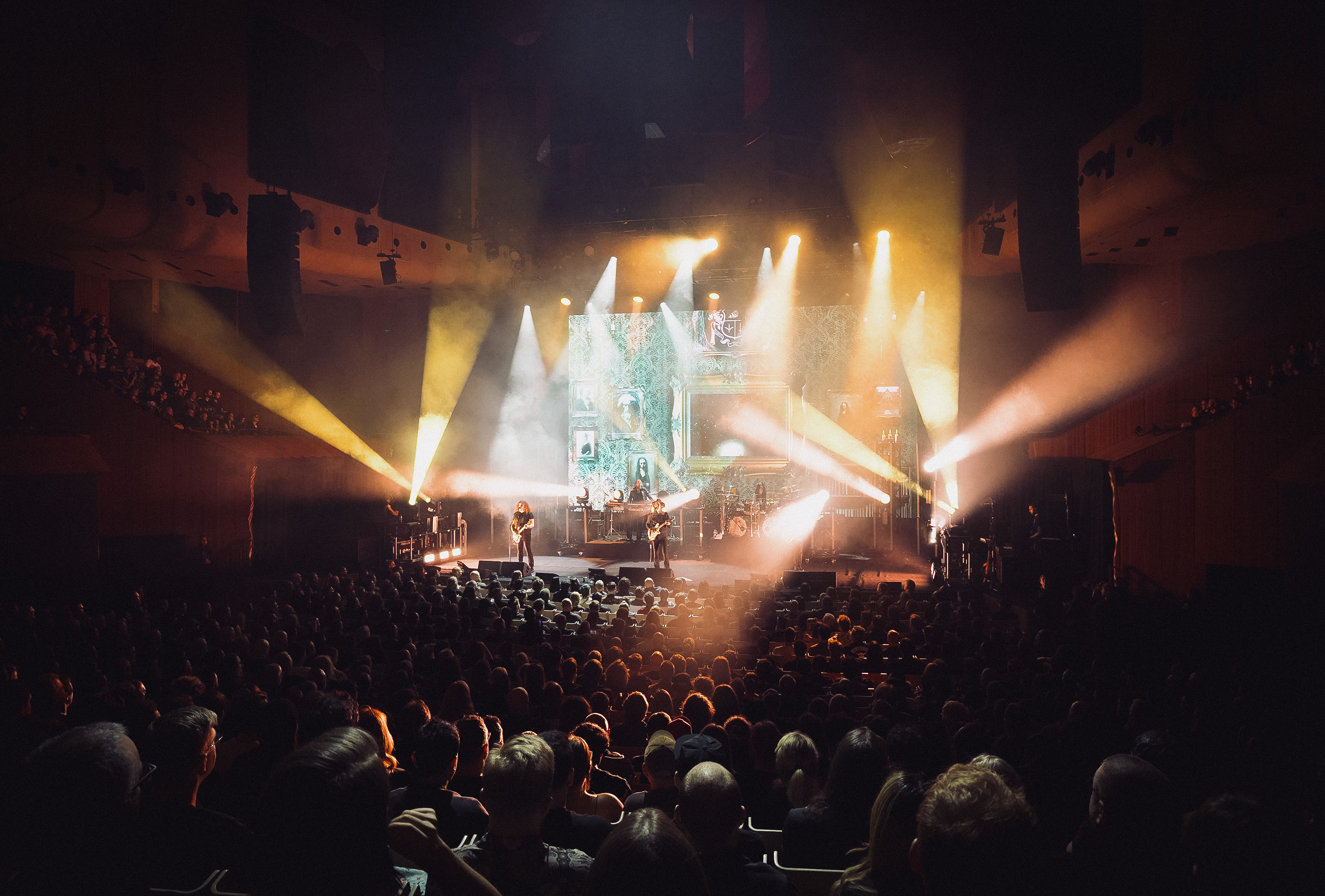
Opeth performing at the Sydney Opera House in 2025

On 16 November 2021, it was announced that longtime drummer Martin Axenrot had left the band due to conflict of interests and his refusal to get vaccinated against COVID-19, and was replaced by Sami Karppinen for the North American tour. On 9 September 2022, it was announced Waltteri Väyrynen (formerly of Paradise Lost and Alexi Laiho's project Bodom After Midnight) was the band's new drummer.

On 1 August 2024, Opeth announced that their fourteenth studio album The Last Will and Testament would be released on 11 October, although the date was postponed to 22 November due to manufacturing delays. With the return of growl vocals after 16 years, last appearing on the album Watershed, the album received positive feedback from many fans and music critics. It was also the band's first fully conceptual record since Still Life in 1999.

== Musical style and influences ==
"Windowpane"
"Windowpane" from Opeth's album Damnation (2003). This clip features the clean vocal style of Mikael Åkerfeldt.

As Opeth's primary songwriter and lyricist, vocalist and guitarist Mikael Åkerfeldt leads the direction of Opeth's sound. He was influenced at a young age by the 1970s progressive rock bands King Crimson, Yes, Rush, Genesis, Van der Graaf Generator, Camel, P.F.M., Hawkwind, Jethro Tull, and Gracious, and by heavy metal bands such as Iron Maiden, Slayer, Death, Black Sabbath, Deep Purple, Celtic Frost, King Diamond, Morbid Angel, and Voivod. Åkerfeldt later discovered progressive rock and folk music, both of which had a profound impact on the sound of the band. Jazz fusion was also an influence for Opeth, in particular Mahavishnu Orchestra, Billy Cobham, Alphonse Mouzon and Herbie Hancock's Head Hunters.

Opeth's distinct sound mixes death metal with progressive rock. Steve Huey of AllMusic described the band's style as "epic, progressive death metal". Ryan Ogle of Blabbermouth said their sound incorporates "the likes of folk, funk, blues, '70s rock, goth and a laundry list of other sonic oddities into their trademark progressive death style." In his review of Opeth's 2001 album Blackwater Park, AllMusic's Eduardo Rivadavia wrote, "Tracks start and finish in seemingly arbitrary fashion, usually traversing ample musical terrain, including acoustic guitar and solo piano passages, ambient soundscapes, stoner rock grooves, and Eastern-tinged melodies—any of which are subject to savage punctuations of death metal fury at any given moment." Åkerfeldt commented on the diversity of Opeth's music:

I don't see the point of playing in a band and going just one way when you can do everything. It would be impossible for us to play just death metal; that is our roots, but we are now a mishmash of everything, and not purists to any form of music. It's impossible for us to do that, and quite frankly I would think of it as boring to be in a band that plays just metal music. We're not afraid to experiment, or to be caught with our pants down, so to speak. That's what keeps us going.

In 2011, Opeth abandoned their death metal sound, focusing on a mellower progressive rock sound. When talking about Heritage, guitarist Fredrik Åkesson stated:

In the beginning it took me a little while to get used to the new idea of the sound, not having any screaming vocals and stuff like that. But I think the album was necessary for us to do. Maybe the band wouldn't have continued if we hadn't done Heritage. I think the old Opeth fans understand this album. There's always going to be some haters, but you can't be loved by everyone. Opeth has always been about not repeating ourself. A lot of people don't think Heritage is metal but I think it's metal to go somewhere people don't expect. It doesn't mean we're not embracing the past sound of Opeth.

Vocally, Åkerfeldt shifts between traditional death metal vocals for heavy sections, and clean, sometimes whispered or soft-spoken vocals over mellower passages. While his death growls were dominant on early releases, later efforts incorporate more clean vocals, with Damnation, Heritage, Pale Communion, Sorceress and In Cauda Venenum featuring only clean singing. Rivadavia noted that "Åkerfeldt's vocals run the gamut from bowel-churning grunts to melodies of chilling beauty—depending on each movement section's mood."

== Legacy ==
A number of artists and bands have cited Opeth as an influence, among which are Mayan (a project of Mark Jansen from Epica), Luc Lemay of Gorguts, Soen (a band of former Opeth drummer Martin Lopez), Tor Oddmund Suhrke of Leprous, Disillusion, Caligula's Horse, Klimt 1918, Daniel Droste of Ahab, Becoming the Archetype, Nucleus Torn, Alex Vynogradoff of Kauan, Wastefall, Eric Guenther of The Contortionist, Thomas MacLean and To-Mera, The Man-Eating Tree, Nahemah, Vladimir Agafonkin of Obiymy Doshchu, Schizoid Lloyd, Native Construct, Maxime Côté of Catuvolcus, Bilocate, and Jinjer.

In addition, other artists have been quoted expressing admiration for their work including Steven Wilson, Seven Lions, John Petrucci, Mike Portnoy, Ihsahn, Simone Simons of Epica, Oliver Palotai of Kamelot, Jim Matheos of Fates Warning, and Haken.

In 2016, the staff of Loudwire named them the twelfth-best metal band of all time.

== Band members ==
Current

Image	Name	Years active	Instruments	Release contributions
	Mikael Åkerfeldt	1990–present	guitars; lead vocals (since 1992); bass (1990, 1992, 1997)	all Opeth releases
	Martín Méndez	1997–present	bass	all Opeth releases from Still Life (1999) onwards
	Fredrik Åkesson	2007–present	guitars; backing vocals	all Opeth releases from Watershed (2008) onwards
	Joakim Svalberg	2011–present	keyboards; backing vocals	all Opeth releases from Pale Communion (2014) onwards
	Waltteri Väyrynen	2022–present	drums	The Last Will and Testament (2024)

== Discography ==
- Orchid (1995)
- Morningrise (1996)
- My Arms, Your Hearse (1998)
- Still Life (1999)
- Blackwater Park (2001)
- Deliverance (2002)
- Damnation (2003)
- Ghost Reveries (2005)
- Watershed (2008)
- Heritage (2011)
- Pale Communion (2014)
- Sorceress (2016)
- In Cauda Venenum (2019)
- The Last Will and Testament (2024)
