= Martin Axenrot =

Swedish death metal drummer

- Axenrot with Opeth in 2015

Background information
- Also known as: Axe, Devastator, Skeleton, Legolas
- Born: Erik Martin Axenrot; 5 March 1979 (age 47); Linköping, Östergötland, Sweden
- Genres: Progressive death metal, death metal, progressive rock, thrash metal, black metal, jazz fusion
- Occupation: Musician
- Instruments: Drums, percussion, guitar, piano, vocals
- Years active: 1992–present
- Member of: Bloodbath
- Formerly of: Opeth
- Website: trondheimexperiment.com

Erik Martin "Axe" Axenrot (born 5 March 1979 in Linköping, Sweden) is a Swedish death metal drummer, best known as the former drummer for progressive metal band Opeth (2005–2021). Since 2004, he is the drummer for Bloodbath. Known for his intricate playing style, his drumming has been highly praised by Opeth members and fans, with Mikael Åkerfeldt calling him "a joy to play with." Axenrot has also been jokingly referred to as The Lord of the Rings character Legolas by band members and fans.

On Blabbermouth.com, Mikael Åkerfeldt stated that Axenrot completed his drumming parts for eleven tracks on the Opeth album Watershed in just seven days.

Nathalie Lorichs, who performed vocals on "Coil" on Opeth's Watershed album, is Axenrot's girlfriend.

== History ==
Martin Axenrot's second band, Triumphator, formed in 1995 and made two records ("The Ultimate Sacrifice" EP and full length "Wings of Antichrist"). Martin Axenrot was only involved with Triumphator's demo "The Triumph Of Satan", released in 1996. He left Triumphator after the demo’s release.

In 1999, Axenrot became a member of Witchery and Nifelheim.

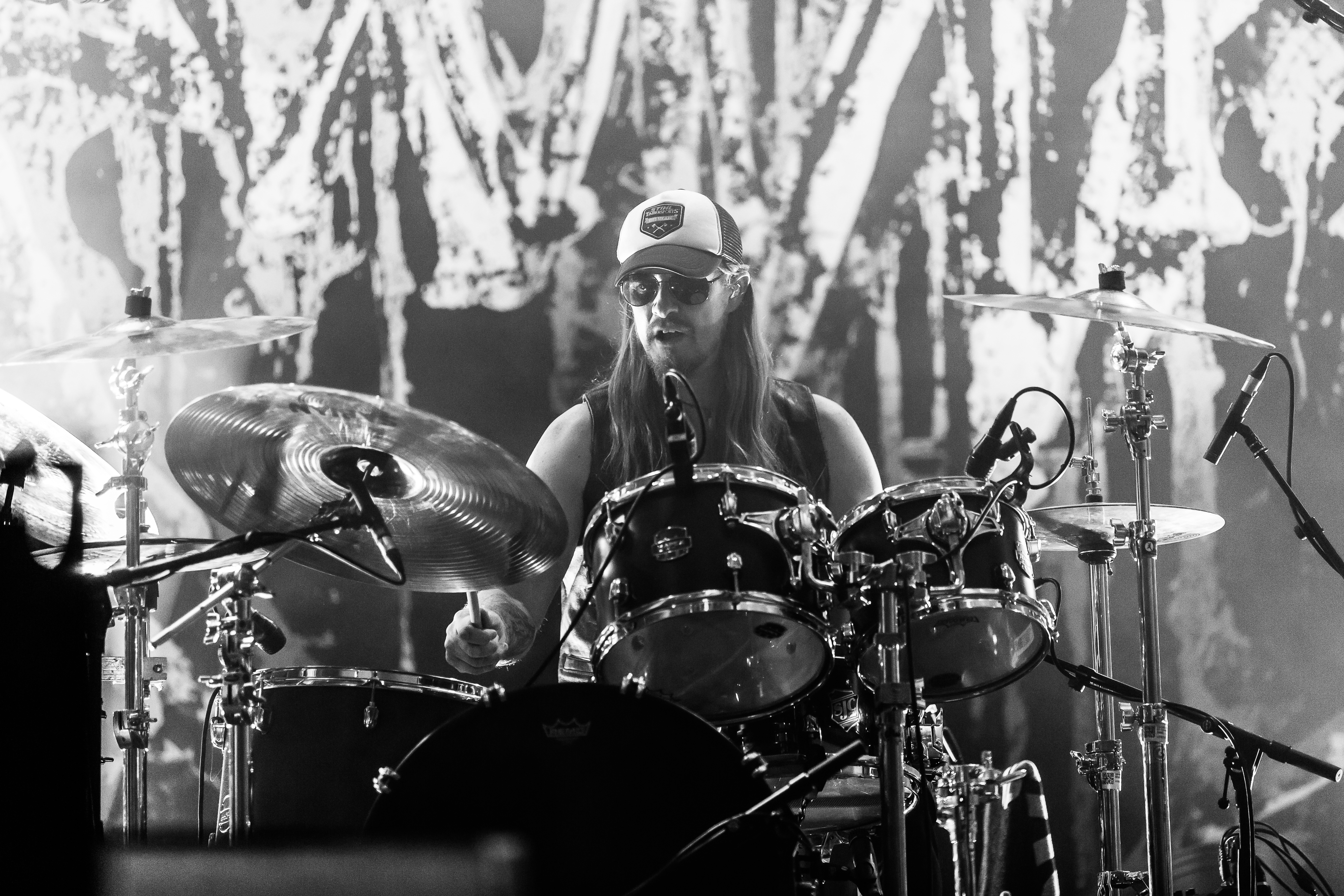
Axenrot with Bloodbath in 2023

In 2004, he joined Bloodbath as their new drummer after Dan Swanö who continued in the band as one of the guitarists and songwriters. Axenrot met Mikael Åkerfeldt sometime after 15 February 2005, when Peter Tägtgren quit Bloodbath and Åkerfeldt came back into the band again to replace Tägtgren. Axenrot commented on meeting Åkerfeldt, stating "I knew Mikael Åkerfeldt because of the Bloodbath project. I met the other members a couple times because I played festivals with other bands at the same time as Opeth. Sweden is too small to not know every band here. Everybody knows everybody."

On 29 August 2005, Martin Lopez of Opeth, had to leave the band again temporarily due to his illnesses. With Opeth searching for a temporary drummer, Patrik Jensen suggested to Åkerfeldt that his bandmate in Witchery, Axenrot, fill in. Åkerfeldt knew Axenrot a bit from being bandmates in Bloodbath, but going on Jensen's reference, Åkerfeldt got Axenrot to play with Opeth for five tours. On 12 May 2006 Axenrot officially joined Opeth, as Lopez never returned to Opeth after deciding to focus on Soen.

In 2010 Axenrot, together with Opeth bassist Martin Mendez, performed together with the late Jon Lord and an Orchestra in Nidarosdomen, Trondheim, Norway.

On 16 November 2021, after 16 years with the band, it was announced that Axenrot had left Opeth due to "conflict of interests" (his Bloodbath bandmate Nick Holmes said in an interview that Axenrot decided against taking the COVID-19 vaccine); Sami Karppinen filled in for the North American tour with Mastodon.

== Equipment ==
Axenrot uses DW Drums, Sabian cymbals, Evans heads and Pro Mark sticks.

== Discography ==
Release	Band	Membership	Year
Servants of Darkness	Nifelheim	Ex-Member	2000
Symphony for the Devil	Witchery	Ex-Member	2001
Banished to the Underworld	Satanic Slaughter	Ex-Member	2002
Pure Black Disease	Nephenzy Chaos Order	Ex-Member	2003
Nightmares Made Flesh	Bloodbath	Member	2004
Promo 2006	Nephenzy Chaos Order	Ex-Member	2006
Don't Fear the Reape	Witchery	Ex-Member	2006
The Roundhouse Tapes	Opeth	Ex-Member	2007
Watershed	Opeth	Ex-Member	2008
The Fathomless Mastery	Bloodbath	Member	2008
Witchkrieg	Witchery	Ex-Member	2010
In Live Concert at the Royal Albert Hall	Opeth	Ex-Member	2010
Heritage	Opeth	Ex-Member	2011
Grand Morbid Funeral	Bloodbath	Member	2014
Pale Communion	Opeth	Ex-Member	2014
Sorceress	Opeth	Ex-Member	2016
Garden of the Titans: Live at Red Rocks Amphitheater	Opeth	Ex-Member	2017
The Arrow of Satan Is Drawn	Bloodbath	Member	2018
In Cauda Venenum	Opeth	Ex-Member	2019
Death's Rider	Hellbutcher	Current	2022
Survival of the sickest	Bloodbath	Member	2022
Hellbutcher	Hellbucher	Member	2024
