= Timeline of progressive rock (2010–2019) =

This is a timeline of artists, albums, and events in progressive rock and its subgenres. This article contains the timeline for the period 2010–2019.

== Contents ==
2010 – 2011 – 2012 – 2013 – 2014 – 2015 – 2016 – 2017 – 2018 – 2019

- See also
- Links and references

== 2010 ==
=== Newly formed bands ===
- King Gizzard & the Lizard Wizard
- stOrk
- The Fierce and the Dead

=== Albums ===
Release Date	Artist	Album	Country
18 January 2010	Motorpsycho	Heavy Metal Fruit	Norway
25 January 2010	Ange	Le Bois Travaille Même Le Dimanche	France
25 January 2010	Jaga Jazzist	One-Armed Bandit	Norway
25 January 2010	Panic Room	Satellite	UK
10 February 2010	Mastermind	Insomnia	USA
15 February 2010	Karnataka	The Gathering Light	UK
20 February 2010	FromUz	Seventh Story	Uzbekistan
26 February 2010	Gazpacho	A Night At Loreley	Norway
12 March 2010	Kaipa	In the Wake of Evolution	Sweden
30 March 2010	Haken	Aquarius	UK
9 April 2010	The Ocean	Heliocentric	Germany
13 April 2010	Coheed & Cambria	Year of the Black Rainbow	USA
20 April 2010	Periphery	Periphery	USA
30 April 2010	Unitopia	Artificial	Australia
17 May 2010	Pain of Salvation	Road Salt One	Sweden
20 May 2010	Porcupine Tree	Anesthetize	UK
1 May 2010	Mystery	One Among the Living	Canada
1 May 2010	Spock's Beard	X	USA
1 June 2010	Pineapple Thief	Someone Here Is Missing	UK
17 June 2010	Porcupine Tree	Atlanta	UK
25 June 2010	Demians	Mute	France
16 July 2010	Beardfish	Mammoth	Sweden
16 July 2010	Sky Architect	Excavations of the Mind	Netherlands
13 August 2010	Iron Maiden	The Final Frontier	UK
13 September 2010	Tinyfish	The Big Red Spark	UK
14 September 2010	Glass Hammer	If	USA
20 September 2010	Opeth	In Live Concert at the Royal Albert Hall	Sweden
28 September 2010	James LaBrie	Static Impulse	USA
1 October 2010	Guy Manning	Charlestown	UK
1 October 2010	Moon Safari	Lover's End	Sweden
11 October 2010	Jon Anderson and Rick Wakeman	The Living Tree	UK
12 October 2010	Intronaut	Valley of Smoke	USA
13 October 2010	Mostly Autumn	Go Well Diamond Heart	UK
26 October 2010	Transatlantic	Whirld Tour 2010: Live in London	International
9 November 2010	Lunatic Soul	Lunatic Soul II	Poland
9 November 2010	The Ocean	Anthropocentric	Germany
26 November 2010	Gazpacho	Missa Atropos	Norway

=== Events ===
- Genesis were inducted into the Rock and Roll Hall of Fame.
- Mike Portnoy unexpectedly left Dream Theater due to a disagreement between the band members, resulting in Mike Mangini taking his place as the new drummer for Dream Theater.
- Emerson, Lake and Palmer reunited for a single show on their 40th anniversary, to headline the new born High Voltage Festival.
- Todd La Torre replaced Wade Black as the lead singer of Crimson Glory.
- In late 2010, Supertramp performed on a series of concerts through Europe.

== 2011 ==
=== Newly formed bands ===
- Flying Colors
- Hällas

=== Reformed bands ===
- Igra Staklenih Perli

=== Albums ===
Release Date	Artist	Album	Country
21 January 2011	Gandalf's Fist	The Master and the Monkey	UK
25 January 2011	DICE	Newborn	Germany
25 January 2011	Magic Pie	The Suffering Joy	Norway
22 February 2011	Evergrey	Glorious Collision	Sweden
14 March 2011	Van der Graaf Generator	A Grounding in Numbers	UK
21 March 2011	Von Hertzen Brothers	Stars Aligned	Finland
22 March 2011	Protest the Hero	Scurrilous	Canada
22 March 2011	TesseracT	One	UK
28 March 2011	Blackfield	Welcome to My DNA	UK
11 April 2011	Pendragon	Passion	UK
12 April 2011	Between the Buried and Me	The Parallax: Hypersleep Dialogues	USA
18 May 2011	Wobbler	Rites at Dawn	Norway
23 May 2011	Farpoint	Kindred	USA
23 May 2011	Neal Morse	Testimony 2	USA
14 June 2011	The Dear Hunter	The Color Spectrum	USA
17 June 2011	Symphony X	Iconoclast	USA
20 June 2011	Riverside	Memories in My Head (EP)	Poland
20 June 2011	Devin Townsend Project	Deconstruction	Canada
28 June 2011	Gandalf's Fist	Road to Darkness	UK
28 June 2011	Queensrÿche	Dedicated to Chaos	USA
1 July 2011	Yes	Fly From Here	UK
7 July 2011	Apocalypse	The 25th Anniversary BoxSet	Brazil
26 July 2011	Karmakanic	In A Perfect World	Sweden
2 August 2011	Dir En Grey	Dum Spiro Spero	USA
24 August 2011	Leprous	Bilateral	Norway
13 September 2011	Dream Theater	A Dramatic Turn of Events	USA
20 September 2011	Opeth	Heritage	Sweden
24 September 2011	X-Panda	Flight of Fancy	Estonia
26 September 2011	Mastodon	The Hunter	USA
26 September 2011	Steven Wilson	Grace for Drowning	UK
26 September 2011	The Tangent	COMM	UK
26 September 2011	Pain of Salvation	Road Salt Two	Sweden
10 October 2011	Elder	Dead Roots Stirring	USA
24 October 2011	Haken	Visions	UK
25 October 2011	Glass Hammer	Cor Cordium	USA
3 November 2011	Outlaws of Ravenhurst	Book I	Canada
8 November 2011	Lunatic Soul	Impressions	Poland
9 November 2011	After Crying	Creatura	Hungary
2 December 2011	Dark Suns	Orange	Germany

=== Disbandments ===
- Oceansize
- Pure Reason Revolution

=== Events ===
- Pink Floyd signed a new deal with EMI records and began massive Why Pink Floyd...? reissue campaign.
- Mike Mangini joined Dream Theater as new drummer.
- Thirty Seconds to Mars set a Guinness World Record for the most shows played during a single album cycle.
- Nick D'Virgilio left his duties as the lead vocalist and drummer for Spock's Beard and was replaced by Ted Leonard (Vocals) and Jimmy Keegan (Drums)... Keegan had played with the band previously as a touring drummer.

== 2012 ==
=== Newly formed bands ===
- Soen
- Storm Corrosion

=== Albums ===
Release Date	Artist	Album	Country
21 January 2012	RPWL	Beyond Man and Time	Germany
23 January 2012	Landmarq	Entertaining Angels	UK
27 January 2012	Sylvan	Sceneries	Germany
10 February 2012	Motorpsycho & Ståle Storløkken	The Death Defying Unicorn	Norway
14 February 2012	Spock's Beard	The X Tour Live	USA
15 February 2012	Soen	Cognitive	Sweden
25 February 2012	AraPacis	Netherworld	Canada
28 February 2012	Steven Wilson	Catalog / Preserve / Amass (Live)	USA
1 March 2012	Moon Safari	The Gettysburg Address	Sweden
12 March 2012	Gazpacho	March of Ghosts	Norway
17 March 2012	Forward Shapes	Legacy	USA
19 March 2012	Astra	The Black Chord	USA
26 March 2012	The Mars Volta	Noctourniquet	USA
26 March 2012	Flying Colors	Flying Colors	USA
2 April 2012	Ian Anderson	Thick as a Brick 2	UK
16 April 2012	Anathema	Weather Systems	UK
16 April 2012	Quidam	Saiko	Poland
23 April 2012	Arjen Lucassen	Lost in the New Real	Netherlands
7 May 2012	Storm Corrosion	Storm Corrosion	UK/Sweden
7 May 2012	Ne Obliviscaris	Portal of I	Australia
21 May 2012	Ange	Moyen-Âge	France
22 May 2012	Headspace	I Am Anonymous	UK
23 May 2012	Sigur Rós	Valtari	Iceland
8 June 2012	Thank You Scientist	Maps of Non-Existent Places	USA
12 June 2012	Rush	Clockwork Angels	Canada
12 June 2012	Proyecto Eskhata	Decadencia	Spain
18 June 2012	The Flower Kings	Banks of Eden	Sweden
19 June 2012	Echolyn	echolyn	USA
25 June 2012	Panic Room	Skin	UK
25 June 2012	Van der Graaf Generator	ALT	UK
29 June 2012	Änglagård	Viljans Öga	Sweden
3 July 2012	Periphery	Periphery II: This Time It's Personal	USA
6 July 2012	Saga	20/20	Canada
9 July 2012	Magma	Félicité Thösz	France
17 July 2012	Baroness	Yellow & Green	USA
24 July 2012	Mostly Autumn	The Ghost Moon Orchestra	UK
10 August 2012	Mystery	The World Is a Game	Canada
16 August 2012	Gandalf's Fist	From A Point Of Existence	UK
27 August 2012	Beardfish	The Void	Sweden
28 August 2012	Kaipa	Vittjar	Sweden
1 September 2012	Hidria Spacefolk	Astronautica	Finland
3 September 2012	Big Big Train	English Electric Part One	UK
3 September 2012	The Pineapple Thief	All the Wars	UK
4 September 2012	3RDegree	The Long Division	USA
17 September 2012	Marillion	Sounds That Can't Be Made	UK
24 September 2012	To-Mera	Exile	UK
9 October 2012	Between the Buried and Me	The Parallax II: Future Sequence	USA
9 October 2012	Coheed and Cambria	The Afterman: Ascension	USA
22 October 2012	Steve Hackett	Genesis Revisited II	UK
23 October 2012	Glass Hammer	Perilous	USA
10 December 2012	Unitopia	Covered Mirror Vol. 1: Smooth as Silk	Australia
17 December 2012	Duncan Parsons	Abandoned Buildings	UK

=== Disbandments ===
- The Mars Volta

=== Events ===
- The Flower Kings returned from a 5-year hiatus to release their 12th studio album.
- Yes lead singer Benoît David left Yes due to respiratory illness and was replaced by Glass Hammer lead vocalist Jon Davison.
- Queensrÿche fired lead singer Geoff Tate after threats and physical altercations provoked by Tate. He was replaced by Crimson Glory vocalist Todd La Torre.

== 2013 ==
=== Newly formed bands ===
- Agusa

=== Albums ===
Release Date	Artist	Album	Country
21 January 2013	Riverside	Shrine of New Generation Slaves	Poland
5 February 2013	Lifesigns	Lifesigns	UK
5 February 2013	Coheed and Cambria	The Afterman: Descension	USA
25 February 2013	Steven Wilson	The Raven That Refused to Sing (And Other Stories)	UK
4 March 2013	Big Big Train	English Electric Part Two	UK
18 March 2013	Von Hertzen Brothers	Nine Lives	Finland
18 March 2013	Intronaut	Habitual Levitations (Instilling Words with Tones)	USA
29 March 2013	Persefone	Spiritual Migration	Andorra
3 April 2013	Dir En Grey	The Unraveling	Japan
3 April 2013	Spock's Beard	Brief Nocturnes and Dreamless Sleep	USA
12 April 2013	Motorpsycho	Still Life With Eggplant	Norway
15 April 2013	The Physics House Band	Horizons / Rapture	UK
17 April 2013	Vermilion Sands	Spirits of the Sun	Japan
26 April 2013	The Ocean	Pelagial	Germany
20 May 2013	Leprous	Coal	Canada
20 May 2013	Sound of Contact	Dimensionaut	UK
27 May 2013	TesseracT	Altered State	UK
5 June 2013	Lizard	Master & M	Poland
11 June 2013	Scale the Summit	Migration	USA
24 June 2013	The Tangent	Le Sacre du Travail	UK
25 June 2013	Queensrÿche	Queensrÿche	USA
10 July 2013	Proyecto Eskhata	El despertar de Queztgull	Spain
19 July 2013	Karnivool	Asymmetry	Australia
21 August 2013	Moon Safari	Himlabacken Vol. 1	Sweden
26 August 2013	Blackfield	IV	International
29 August 2013	AraPacis	Déjà Vu (EP)	Canada
2 September 2013	Haken	The Mountain	UK
4 September 2013	Fish	A Feast of Consequences	UK
5 September 2013	Levin Minnemann Rudess	Levin Minnemann Rudess	USA
18 September 2013	Gandalf's Fist	A Day in the Life of a Universal Wanderer	UK
23 September 2013	Dream Theater	Dream Theater	USA
27 September 2013	Subsignal	Paraiso	Germany
30 September 2013	Fates Warning	Darkness in a Different Light	USA
2 October 2013	Thought Chamber	Psykerion	Australia
4 October 2013	Caligula's Horse	The Tide, the Thief & River's End	USA
28 October 2013	Ayreon	The Theory of Everything	Netherlands
28 October 2013	The Flower Kings	Desolation Rose	Sweden
19 November 2013	RanestRane	A Space Odyssey, Part One - Monolith	Italy

=== Events ===
- Rush was inducted into the Rock and Roll Hall of Fame.
- Todd La Torre left Crimson Glory citing long periods of inactivity as his reason.
- Lindsay Cooper (Henry Cow, Comus, Feminist Improvising Group) died 18 September.
- Richard Coughlan (The Wilde Flowers, Caravan) died 1 December.

== 2014 ==
=== Albums ===
Release Date	Artist	Album	Country
22 January 2014	RPWL	Wanted	Germany
25 January 2014	Karmakanic	Live in the US	Sweden
27 January 2014	Transatlantic	Kaleidoscope	International
3 March 2014	Bigelf	Into the Maelstrom	USA
7 March 2014	Motorpsycho	Behind the Sun	Norway
10 March 2014	Panic Room	Incarnate	UK
11 March 2014	Glass Hammer	Ode to Echo	USA
17 March 2014	Gazpacho	Demon	Norway
24 March 2014	Animals As Leaders	The Joy of Motion	USA
2 April 2014	Agusa	Högtid	Sweden
14 April 2014	Ian Anderson	Homo Erraticus	UK
3 May 2014	IQ	The Road of Bones	UK
1 June 2014	Mostly Autumn	Dressed in Voices	UK
4 June 2014	Anathema	Distant Satellites	UK
24 June 2014	Mastodon	Once More 'Round the Sun	USA
27 June 2014	Saga	Sagacity	Canada
8 July 2014	Abel Ganz	Abel Ganz	UK
16 July 2014	Yes	Heaven & Earth	UK
26 August 2014	Opeth	Pale Communion	Sweden
16 September 2014	The Contortionist	Language	USA
16 September 2014	The Pineapple Thief	Magnolia	UK
19 September 2014	Threshold	For the Journey	UK
26 September 2014	Evergrey	Hymns for the Broken	Sweden
29 September 2014	Duncan Parsons	Music for Stairlifts (Vol 1)	UK
29 September 2014	Flying Colors	Second Nature	USA
30 September 2014	Enchant	The Great Divide	USA
13 October 2014	Lunatic Soul	Walking on a Flashlight Beam	Poland
14 October 2014	Moon Safari	Live in Mexico	Sweden
20 October 2014	Gandalf's Fist	A Forest Of Fey	UK
27 October 2014	Devin Townsend	Z²	Canada
27 October 2014	Haken	Restoration (EP)	UK
31 October 2014	King Gizzard & the Lizard Wizard	I'm in Your Mind Fuzz	Australia
7 November 2014	Pink Floyd	The Endless River	UK
7 November 2014	Ne Obliviscaris	Citadel	Australia
10 November 2014	Kaipa	Sattyg	Sweden
11 November 2014	Soen	Tellurian	Sweden
3 December 2014	Duncan Parsons	C:Ore	UK
9 December 2014	Dave Kerzner	New World	USA

== 2015 ==
=== Newly formed bands ===
- Earthside
- Glass Beach
- Native Construct
- Lonely Robot

=== Albums ===
Release Date	Artist	Album	Country
12 January 2015	Beardfish	+4626-COMFORTZONE	Sweden
12 January 2015	King Crimson	Live at the Orpheum	UK
27 January 2015	Periphery	Juggernaut: Alpha / Juggernaut: Omega	USA
2 February 2015	Vola	Inmazes	Denmark/Sweden
20 February 2015	Sylvan	Home	Germany
23 February 2015	Lonely Robot	Please Come Home	UK
27 February 2015	Elder	Lore	USA
27 February 2015	Steven Wilson	Hand. Cannot. Erase.	UK
9 March 2015	Karnataka	Secrets of Angels	UK
20 March 2015	Von Hertzen Brothers	New Day Rising	Finland
25 March 2015	Nightwish	Endless Forms Most Beautiful	Finland
31 March 2015	Glass Hammer	The Breaking of the World	USA
10 April 2015	Anekdoten	Until All the Ghosts Are Gone	Sweden
13 April 2015	Gavin Harrison	Cheating the Polygraph	UK
20 April 2015	The Tangent	A Spark in the Aether	UK/Sweden
27 April 2015	Arena	The Unquiet Sky	UK
1 May 2015	King Gizzard & the Lizard Wizard	Quarters!	Australia
5 May 2015	Kamelot	Haven	USA
25 May 2015	Leprous	The Congregation	Norway
25 May 2015	Magic Pie	King for a Day	Norway
1 June 2015	Big Big Train	Wassail (EP)	UK
5 June 2015	Muse	Drones	UK
10 July 2015	Between The Buried and Me	Coma Ecliptic	USA
17 July 2015	Tim Bowness	Stupid Things That Mean the World	UK
24 July 2015	Agusa	Två	Sweden
24 July 2015	Symphony X	Underworld	USA
31 July 2015	Echolyn	I Heard You Listening	USA
18 August 2015	3RDegree	Ones & Zeros: Volume 1	USA
21 August 2015	Spock's Beard	The Oblivion Particle	USA
4 September 2015	Iron Maiden	The Book of Souls	UK
4 September 2015	The Dear Hunter	Act IV: Rebirth in Reprise	USA
4 September 2015	Riverside	Love, Fear and the Time Machine	Poland
18 September 2015	David Gilmour	Rattle That Lock	UK
18 September 2015	TesseracT	Polaris	UK
18 September 2015	Scale the Summit	V	USA
25 September 2015	John Hackett	Another Life	UK
2 October 2015	Queensrÿche	Condition Hüman	USA
16 October 2015	Coheed and Cambria	The Color Before the Sun	USA
16 October 2015	Caligula's Horse	Bloom	Australia
23 October 2015	Gazpacho	Molok	Norway
1 November 2015	Mystery	Delusion Rain	Canada
13 November 2015	Intronaut	The Direction of Last Things	USA
4 December 2015	Intervals	The Shape of Colour	Canada
4 December 2015	RanestRane	A Space Odyssey, Part Two – H.A.L.	Italy
18 December 2015	Baroness	Purple	UK

=== Events ===
- In mid 2015, Supertramp announced they would be performing a 25-date tour throughout Europe, from November to December, this being their first tour in more than 4 years. Soon afterwards, however, the tour was cancelled due to the band's leader Rick Davies health problems. Ever since, there hasn't been news on a new Supertramp tour, much less a reunion with former co-frontman Roger Hodgson.

== 2016 ==
=== Newly formed bands ===
- Mantra Vega
- The John Hackett Band
- The Mute Gods
- Anderson/Stolt

=== Albums ===
Release Date	Artist	Album	Country
8 January 2016	David Bowie	Blackstar	UK
22 January 2016	Steven Wilson	4 ½ (EP)	UK
22 January 2016	The Mute Gods	Do Nothing till You Hear from Me	International
25 January 2016	Mantra Vega	The Illusion's Reckoning	USA
27 January 2016	Proyecto Eskhata	2984	Spain
29 January 2016	Dream Theater	The Astonishing	USA
10 February 2016	Rikard Sjöblom (of Beardfish)	The Unbendable Sleep	Sweden
12 February 2016	Motorpsycho	Here Be Monsters	Norway
26 February 2016	Headspace	All You Fear is Gone	UK
29 February 2016	Different Light	The Burden Of Paradise	Czech Republic
14 March 2016	Trettioåriga Kriget	Seaside Air	Sweden
18 March 2016	Circus Maximus	Havoc	Norway
21 March 2016	Lizard	Trochę Żółci, Trochę Więcej Bieli	Poland
1 April 2016	The Enid	Dust	UK
1 April 2016	iamthemorning	Lighthouse	Russia
20 April 2016	The Fall of Troy	OK	USA
29 April 2016	Haken	Affinity	UK
29 April 2016	King Gizzard & the Lizard Wizard	Nonagon Infinity	Australia
30 April 2016	AraPacis	System Deceive	Canada
1 May 2016	Gandalf's Fist	The Clockwork Fable	UK
8 May 2016	Radiohead	A Moon Shaped Pool	UK
20 May 2016	Katatonia	The Fall of Hearts	Sweden
27 May 2016	Frost*	Falling Satellites	UK
27 May 2016	Big Big Train	Folklore	UK
3 June 2016	Dark Suns	Everchild	Germany
17 June 2016	Gojira	Magma	France
1 July 2016	Fates Warning	Theories of Flight	USA
1 July 2016	Pain of Salvation	Remedy Lane Re:visited (Re:mixed & Re:lived)	Sweden
8 July 2016	Anderson/Stolt	Invention of Knowledge	UK/Sweden
22 July 2016	Periphery	Periphery III: Select Difficulty	USA
22 July 2016	Karmakanic	DOT	Sweden
29 July 2016	Thank You Scientist	Stranger Heads Prevail	USA
12 August 2016	The Pineapple Thief	Your Wilderness	UK
22 August 2016	Agusa	Katarsis	Sweden
26 August 2016	Plini	Handmade Cities	Australia
2 September 2016	Devin Townsend Project	Transcendence	Canada
9 September 2016	The Dear Hunter	Act V: Hymns with the Devil in Confessional	USA
9 September 2016	Evergrey	The Storm Within	Sweden
19 September 2016	Disen Gage	Snapshots	Russia
23 September 2016	Marillion	FEAR (F*** Everyone and Run)	UK
23 September 2016	Kansas	The Prelude Implicit	USA
27 September 2016	Glass Hammer	Valkyrie	USA
30 September 2016	Opeth	Sorceress	Sweden
30 September 2016	Van der Graaf Generator	Do Not Disturb	UK
10 October 2016	X-Panda	Reflections	Estonia
21 October 2016	Demians	Battles	France
21 October 2016	Riverside	Eye of the Soundscape	Poland
28 October 2016	Avenged Sevenfold	The Stage	USA
11 November 2016	Animals as Leaders	The Madness of Many	USA
11 November 2016	The Neal Morse Band	The Similitude of a Dream	USA

=== Disbandments ===
- Beardfish

=== Events ===
- David Bowie died due to liver cancer on 10 January; only 2 days after his 69th birthday and the release of his final studio album Blackstar.
- On 21 February 2016, Riverside guitarist Piotr Grudziński died of a sudden heart-attack in Warsaw. His bandmates announced later in September that they would carry on with the band as a three-piece and play their first show on the one-year anniversary of Grudziński's death as a tribute to the guitarist in 2017.
- Emerson, Lake & Palmer keyboardist Keith Emerson died of a self-inflicted gunshot wound on 11 March 2016. A tribute show was held in his honor/legacy by his peers among the progressive rock community on 28 May 2016 in Los Angeles.
- Emerson, Lake & Palmer vocalist and guitar player Greg Lake died in London on 7 December 2016, at the age of 69, after suffering from cancer.

== 2017 ==
=== Newly formed bands ===
- The Nova Collective
- Others By No One
- The Sea Within
- Sons of Apollo
- Vuur

=== Albums ===
Release Date	Artist	Album	Country
13 January 2017	Pain of Salvation	In the Passing Light of Day	Sweden
20 January 2017	Mike Oldfield	Return to Ommadawn	UK
3 February 2017	Soen	Lykaia	USA/Sweden
10 February 2017	Blackfield	Blackfield V	UK/Israel
17 February 2017	Tim Bowness	Lost in the Ghost Light	UK
24 February 2017	DispersE	Foreword	Poland
24 February 2017	King Gizzard & the Lizard Wizard	Flying Microtonal Banana	Australia
24 February 2017	The Mute Gods	Tardigrades Will Inherit The Earth	UK
24 February 2017	Persefone	Aathma	Andorra
10 March 2017	The Nova Collective	The Further Side	International
24 March 2017	Steve Hackett	The Night Siren	UK
31 March 2017	Mastodon	Emperor of Sand	USA
7 April 2017	Mostly Autumn	Sight of Day	UK
21 April 2017	The Physics House Band	Mercury Fountain	UK
21 April 2017	Procol Harum	Novum	UK
28 April 2017	Ayreon	The Source	Netherlands
28 April 2017	Big Big Train	Grimspound	UK
28 April 2017	Lonely Robot	The Big Dream	UK
19 May 2017	Scale the Summit	In A World of Fear	USA
19 May 2017	Rikard Sjöblom's Gungfly	On Her Journey To The Sun	Sweden
2 June 2017	Elder	Reflections of a Floating World	USA
2 June 2017	Roger Waters	Is This The Life We Really Want?	UK
2 June 2017	Sikth	The Future in Whose Eyes?	UK
9 June 2017	Anathema	The Optimist	UK
16 June 2017	Styx	The Mission	USA
23 June 2017	Big Big Train	The Second Brightest Star	UK
23 June 2017	King Gizzard & the Lizard Wizard	Murder of the Universe	Australia
21 July 2017	The Tangent	The Slow Rust of Forgotten Machinery	UK
18 August 2017	Steven Wilson	To the Bone	UK
18 August 2017	King Gizzard & the Lizard Wizard with Mild High Club	Sketches of Brunswick East	Australia
25 August 2017	Leprous	Malina	Norway
25 August 2017	Eloy	The Vision, the Sword and the Pyre – Part I	Germany
8 September 2017	Motorpsycho	The Tower	Norway
8 September 2017	Threshold	Legends of the Shires	UK
15 September 2017	Caligula's Horse	In Contact	Australia
15 September 2017	The Contortionist	Clairvoyant	USA
22 September 2017	Mastodon	Cold Dark Place (EP)	USA
22 September 2017	Kaipa	Children of the Sounds	Sweden
6 October 2017	Lunatic Soul	Fractured	Poland
13 October 2017	Hällas	Excerpts From a Future Past	Sweden
14 October 2017	King Crimson	Live in Chicago	UK
15 October 2017	Dave Kerzner	Static	USA
20 October 2017	Sons of Apollo	Psychotic Symphony	USA
20 October 2017	Wobbler	From Silence to Somewhere	Norway
22 October 2017	Icefish	Human Hardware	International
27 October 2017	Agusa	Agusa	Sweden
27 October 2017	Ne Obliviscaris	Urn	Australia
3 November 2017	Premiata Forneria Marconi	Emotional Tattoos	Italy
3 November 2017	Von Hertzen Brothers	War Is Over	Finland
17 November 2017	King Gizzard & the Lizard Wizard	Polygondwanaland	Australia
27 November 2017	Disen Gage	Hybrid State	Russia
1 December 2017	Intervals	The Way Forward	Canada
1 December 2017	The Dear Hunter	All Is As All Should Be (EP)	USA
31 December 2017	King Gizzard & the Lizard Wizard	Gumboot Soup	Australia

=== Events ===
- 7–11 Feb.: Yes once again hosted their festival at sea, Cruise to the Edge. At the event ex-Dream Theater drummer Mike Portnoy performed his Twelve-step Suite for the first time in its entirety.

== 2018 ==
=== Newly formed bands ===
- Pattern-Seeking Animals

=== Albums ===
Release Date	Artist	Album	Country
11 January 2018	The Yellow Box	The Yellow Box	USA
12 January 2018	Kayak	Seventeen	Netherlands
19 January 2018	Perfect Beings	Vier	USA
22 January 2018	Galahad	Seas of Change	UK
26 January 2018	Orphaned Land	Unsung Prophets & Dead Messiahs	Israel
2 February 2018	Malady	Toinen toista	Finland
7 February 2018	Royal Hunt	Cast in Stone	Denmark
9 February 2018	CMX	Alkuteos	Finland
16 February 2018	Angra	Ømni	Brazil
16 February 2018	Elephant9	Greatest Show on Earth	Norway
23 February 2018	Gleb Kolyadin	Gleb Kolyadin	Russia
2 March 2018	Ange	Heureux!	France
2 March 2018	Rolo Tomassi	Time Will Die and Love Will Bury It	UK
9 March 2018	Between the Buried and Me	Automata I	USA
16 March 2018	Rivers of Nihil	Where Owls Know My Name	USA
16 March 2018	Sammal	Suuliekki	Finland
17 March 2018	AraPacis	Obsolete Continuum	Canada
19 March 2018	Disen Gage	Nature	Russia
20 March 2018	Lazuli	Saison 8	France
23 March 2018	Kino	Radio Voltaire	UK
30 March 2018	Roz Vitalis	The Hidden Man of the Heart	Russia
6 April 2018	Kamelot	The Shadow Theory	USA
6 April 2018	King Crimson	Live in Vienna	UK
20 April 2018	TesseracT	Sonder	UK
30 April 2018	3RDegree	Ones & Zeros: Volume 0	USA
4 May 2018	Ihsahn	Àmr	Norway
18 May 2018	Amorphis	Queen of Time	Finland
18 May 2018	Gazpacho	Soyuz	Norway
25 May 2018	Arena	Double Vision	UK
25 May 2018	Spock's Beard	Noise Floor	USA
25 May 2018	Subsignal	La Muerta	Germany
25 May 2018	Lunatic Soul	Under the Fragmented Sky	Poland
1 June 2018	Karmic Juggernaut	The Dreams that Stuff Are Made Of	USA
11 June 2018	AraPacis	Déjà Doom (EP)	Canada
22 June 2018	Haken	L-1VE	UK
22 June 2018	The Sea Within	The Sea Within	International
29 June 2018	Fates Warning	Live Over Europe	USA
13 July 2018	Between the Buried and Me	Automata II	USA
14 July 2018	Mystery	Lies and Butterflies	Canada
27 July 2018	Michael Romeo	War of the Worlds, Pt. 1	USA
31 August 2018	Phideaux	Infernal	USA
31 August 2018	The Pineapple Thief	Dissolution	UK
8 September 2018	Soft Machine	Hidden Details	UK
14 September 2018	Gryphon	ReInvention	UK
21 September 2018	Voivod	The Wake	Canada
25 September 2018	Overworld Dreams	Voyage	USA
28 September 2018	Riverside	Wasteland	Poland
5 October 2018	Coheed and Cambria	Vaxis – Act I: The Unheavenly Creatures	USA
8 October 2018	Daal	Decalogue of Darkness	Italy
12 October 2018	Seventh Wonder	Tiara	Sweden
12 October 2018	Vola	Applause of a Distant Crowd	Denmark/Sweden
12 October 2018	Glass Hammer	Chronomonaut	USA
26 October 2018	Haken	Vector	UK
2 November 2018	The Ocean	Phanerozoic I: Palaeozoic	Germany
9 November 2018	Rikard Sjöblom's Gungfly	Friendship	Sweden
16 November 2018	All Traps on Earth	A Drop of Light	Sweden
16 November 2018	The Tangent	Proxy	UK/Sweden
17 November 2018	Lizard	Half-Live	Poland
13 December 2018	Agusa	Ekstasis - Live in Rome	Sweden

=== Events ===
- The Moody Blues were inducted into the Rock and Roll Hall of Fame.

== 2019 ==
=== Newly formed bands ===
- In Continuum
- Overworld Dreams

=== Albums ===
Release Date	Artist	Album	Country
25 January 2019	Evergrey	The Atlantic	Sweden
25 January 2019	Focus	Focus 11	Netherlands
25 January 2019	Neal Morse Band	The Great Adventure	USA
25 January 2019	Steve Hackett	At the Edge of Light	UK
1 February 2019	Soen	Lotus	Sweden
14 February 2019	Disen Gage	The Big Adventure	Russia
15 February 2019	Motorpsycho	The Crucible	Norway
22 February 2019	Dream Theater	Distance over Time	USA
1 March 2019	Mostly Autumn	White Rainbow	UK
1 March 2019	Queensrÿche	The Verdict	USA
1 March 2019	Tim Bowness	Flowers at the Scene	UK
22 March 2019	The Mute Gods	Atheists and Believers	UK
22 March 2019	RPWL	Tales From Outer Space	Germany
29 March 2019	Devin Townsend	Empath	USA
31 March 2019	Jon Anderson	1000 Hands: Chapter One	UK
5 April 2019	Periphery	Periphery IV: Hail Stan	USA
12 April 2019	Dark Suns	Half Light Souvenirs	Germany
19 April 2019	Jordan Rudess	Wired for Madness	USA
26 April 2019	Alan Parsons	The Secret	UK
26 April 2019	King Gizzard & the Lizard Wizard	Fishing for Fishies	Australia
10 May 2019	Banco del Mutuo Soccorso	Transiberiana	Italy
17 May 2019	Big Big Train	Grand Tour	UK
18 May 2019	Glass Beach	the first glass beach album	USA
14 June 2019	Baroness	Gold & Grey	USA
14 June 2019	Neal Morse	Jesus Christ: The Exorcist	USA
14 June 2019	Thank You Scientist	Terraformer	USA
22 June 2019	Jolly	Family	USA
28 June 2019	Magma	Zëss: Le Jour Du Néant	France
1 July 2019	Gandalf's Fist	The Clockwork Prologue	UK
5 July 2019	Pattern-Seeking Animals	Pattern-Seeking Animals	USA
2 August 2019	iamthemorning	The Bell	Russia
16 August 2019	Jordan Rudess	Heartfelt	USA
16 August 2019	Moron Police	A Boat on the Sea	Norway
30 August 2019	Magic Pie	Fragments of the 5th Element	Norway
30 August 2019	Tool	Fear Inoculum	USA
31 August 2019	Marco Minnemann	My Sister	Germany
27 September 2019	Eloy	The Vision, the Sword and the Pyre – Part II	Germany
27 September 2019	IQ	Resistance	UK
27 September 2019	Opeth	In Cauda Venenum	Sweden
27 September 2019	The Steve Howe Trio	New Frontier	UK
4 October 2019	Flying Colors	Third Degree	USA
25 October 2019	Anthony Phillips	Strings of Light	UK
25 October 2019	Hawkwind	All Aboard the Skylark	UK
25 October 2019	Leprous	Pitfalls	Norway
28 October 2019	The Enid	U	UK
8 November 2019	The Flower Kings	Waiting for Miracles	Sweden
24 November 2019	Henry Cow	The Henry Cow Box Redux: The Complete Henry Cow	UK

== See also ==
- Timeline of progressive rock: other decades: 1960s – 1970s – 1980s – 1990s – 2000s – 2020s
- Timeline of progressive rock (Parent article)
- Progressive rock
- Canterbury Scene
- Symphonic rock
- Avant-rock
- Rock in Opposition
- Neo-prog
- Progressive metal
- Jazz fusion
- Djent
