= Untold Tales =

Compilation album by Glass Hammer
- Released: October 20, 2017
- Recorded: Early 90s–2017
- Studio: Sound Resources, Chattanooga, Tennessee (studio tracks); Camp House, Chattanooga, Tennessee ("No Man’s Land Live")
- Genre: Progressive rock, symphonic rock
- Length: 71:59
- Label: Arion Records/Audio Resources
- Producer: Steve Babb, Fred Schendel

Glass Hammer chronology
Valkyrie (2016)	Untold Tales (2017)

Untold Tales (full title: Untold Tales – Rare and Previously Unreleased Studio and Live Recordings from 1993–2017) is a compilation album by American progressive rock band Glass Hammer, released on October 20, 2017 to celebrate the band's 25th anniversary. It features previously unreleased or hard to find recordings originating from the early 90s to 2017, and as such features both current and former members of Glass Hammer. It is also the last release of the band with guitarist Kamran Alan Shikoh as band member.

The album features six original songs which had never been released or performed before, a re-recording of a previous Glass Hammer song, three covers, two tracks previously released as part of little-known collaborative albums, and the recording of a live performance. All thirteen tracks are listed based on the year of their original recording.

== Production ==
Glass Hammer announced Untold Tales on August 21, 2017, with a planned "fall 2017" release. The mastering process was about to be completed on August 25.

Some of Untold Tales' songs date back to the band's beginnings; according to Steve Babb, he and co-bandleader and founder Fred Schendel realized they were "sitting on a hoard of unreleased material spanning the life of the band. We thought Glass Hammer’s twenty-fifth anniversary was a good time to release much of it."

The album's first track is a re-recording of "Shadows of the Past", the first track of the band's first album Journey of the Dunadan, originally released in 1993. This version was made by Schendel, originally as a part of a planned entire re-recording of the album, to celebrate the band's fifteenth anniversary. Although this new version of the album never came to be, Schendel had already completed the new version of the first track, using orchestral sounds that were not available to the band back in 1993.

The song "Infusion" was originally released as a part of Love Changes, a 1995 collaborative album credited to "Tracy Cloud featuring Glass Hammer". Cloud was the first artist produced by Glass Hammer at their studio, Sound Resources; she was also featured as a backing vocalist on the Glass Hammer albums Perelandra and On to Evermore. Babb considers the sound of the song to be similar to Perelandra's.

"Identity Principle", which Babb called "one of our best epics", was originally recorded in the "early 90s" for an abandoned project, featuring Walter Moore on vocals. According to Babb, the song had "some sonic issues" in its finale, and the band was never quite satisfied with the mixing. A new ending was written and recorded for Untold Tales, while the rest of the song consists of the original recording. Babb "literally found [the recording] hiding on a backup drive".

The album features two cover songs. The first, "Hold Your Head Up" (originally by Argent), was first performed by Glass Hammer in 1996 during the festival Progscape. Babb estimates that the studio version was recorded "around that time, probably in 1997". The other cover is "It's All Too Much" (originally by The Beatles, although this version was also inspired by Steve Hillage's cover in his 1976 album L), which was recorded in 2009 during the sessions for Three Cheers for the Broken-Hearted, and performed "as an encore piece for a few live shows". For Untold Tales, Glass Hammer replaced their original recording's pipe organ with a Hammond organ, and created a new bass line.

"Babb's Bach" is a recording from 2008 in which Babb performs a re-arranged instrumental version of an excerpt of the 1731 church cantata Wachet auf, ruft uns die Stimme, BWV 140 by Johann Sebastian Bach, namely the fourth movement, Zion hört die Wächter singen. He was inspired to record the song by Wendy Carlos' 1968 album Switched-On Bach, which was Babb's introduction to synthesizer. The sixth track, "And Then She Sighed", was recorded in 2009 for a cancelled J. R. R. Tolkien-themed album. It features singer Laura Lindstrom Davis, who appeared on previous Glass Hammer works, including 2005's The Inconsolable Secret.

"Eiger Dreams" served as the opening track of Glass Hammer's 2008 live album Live at the Tivoli, but its studio recording produced the same year had never been released. The title is a reference to the eponymous book by Jon Krakauer. Babb stated that the track "Troll" was conceived around 2008 and was "inspired by some of the posts we've seen through the years on certain prog-rock websites", referring to internet trolling.

The instrumental "A Grain of Sand" was written by guitarist Kamran Alan Shikoh and recorded in 2010 as a possible track for If. Although it was not ultimately featured, the vocals by Jon Davison recorded for the track were ultimately used in "If the Stars". "Cool Air", a song based on the eponymous short story by H. P. Lovecraft and also featuring Davison, was originally released as a part of The Stories of H.P. Lovecraft, a 2012 collaborative album by different artists. It was recorded that year, from lyrics by Babb and music by Schendel.

"The Impulsive Type" features "live drum tracks" performed by Neil Peart of Rush, originally recorded for the sound library Sonic Reality. After being asked to by Sonic Reality founder Dave Kerzner, Glass Hammer wrote and recorded a song based on this pre-existing drum track, although the resulting song had ultimately been left unreleased. Babb stated about the song "It is not possible to use [Peart's] drums and have it not sound like Rush."

"No Man’s Land Live" was recorded on May 6, 2017 during a concert at Camp House in Chattanooga, Tennessee, where the band performed the album Valkyrie in its entirety.

== Track listing ==
Credits adapted from the album's liner notes by Steve Babb.

No.	Title	Writer(s)	Lead vocals	Length
1.	"Shadows of the Past 2008" (2008 re-recording of "Shadows of the Past" from Journey of the Dunadan)	Fred Schendel	instrumental	2:25
2.	"Infusion" (from Love Changes)	Schendel, Tracy Cloud	instrumental	3:16
3.	"Identity Principle"	Schendel	Walter Moore	12:38
4.	"Hold Your Head Up" (Argent cover)	Rod Argent, Chris White	Moore	4:17
5.	"Babb's Bach" (re-arrangement of Zion hört die Wächter singen from Wachet auf, ruft uns die Stimme, BWV 140)	Johann Sebastian Bach, arr. Steve Babb	instrumental	3:18
6.	"And Then She Sighed"	Babb	Laura Lindstrom Davis	1:59
7.	"Eiger Dreams"	Babb	instrumental	2:23
8.	"It's All Too Much" (The Beatles cover)	George Harrison	Susie Bogdanowicz	4:36
9.	"Troll"	Babb	Babb, Schendel	5:03
10.	"A Grain of Sand"	Kamran Alan Shikoh	instrumental, backing vocals by Jon Davison	2:58
11.	"Cool Air" (from The Stories of H.P. Lovecraft)	Schendel, Babb	Davison	9:44
12.	"The Impulsive Type"	Schendel, Babb, Shikoh	Carl Groves	4:38
13.	"No Man’s Land Live" (2017 live performance of "No Man's Land" from Valkyrie)	Schendel, Babb	Bogdanowicz	14:44

== Personnel ==
Glass Hammer

- Fred Schendel – lead and backing vocals, keyboards, guitars, drums, percussion, others
- Steve Babb – lead and backing vocals, bass, keyboards, percussion, others
- Walter Moore – lead vocals and drums on "Identity Principle" and "Hold Your Head Up"
- Susie Bogdanowicz – lead vocals on "It's All Too Much" and "No Man’s Land Live"
- Carl Groves – lead vocals on "The Impulsive Type"
- Jon Davison – lead vocals on "Cool Air", backing vocals on "A Grain of Sand"
- Kamran Alan Shikoh – guitars on "A Grain of Sand", "Cool Air", "The Impulsive Type", and "No Man’s Land Live"
- Aaron Raulston – drums on "No Man’s Land Live"

Additional musicians

- Tracy Cloud – co-performed "Infusion"^{1}
- Laura Lindstrom Davis – lead vocals on "And Then She Sighed"
- David Carter – guitars on "Hold Your Head Up"
- David Wallimann – guitars on "Eiger Dreams"
- Matt Mendians – drums on "Eiger Dreams"
- Randall Williams – drums on "Cool Air"
- Neil Peart – drums on "The Impulsive Type"^{2}
- Allison Savard, Kaytie Mitchell, Kendra Roden – girls choir on "And Then She Sighed"
- Tim Starnes – harmonica on "Troll"
- Jon-Michael Babb – sound effects on "Cool Air"

Production

- Steve Babb – production, liner notes
- Fred Schendel – production
- Bret Noblitt – live sound engineer
- Julie Babb – administration, photography
- Michelle Young – photography

^{1}The track features the credit "Performed by Fred Schendel, Tracy Cloud and Steve Babb". As Cloud is a singer, and the song is an instrumental, the nature of her involvement in the performance is unclear.
^{2}The track features pre-existing drum tracks performed by Peart, made available to the band by Sonic Reality. Official credit goes to "Neil Part Drums by Sonic Reality".
