= The Middle-Earth Album =

Studio album by Glass Hammer
- Released: June 15, 2001
- Genre: Folk rock, progressive rock
- Length: 45:02
- Label: Arion Records/Sound Resources
- Producer: Steve Babb, Fred Schendel

Glass Hammer chronology
Chronometree (2000)	The Middle-Earth Album (2001)	Lex Rex (2002)

The Middle-Earth Album is the fifth studio album by American progressive rock band Glass Hammer, released on June 15, 2001. It is the band's second album based on J.R.R. Tolkien's novel The Lord of the Rings, after their 1993 debut album, Journey of the Dunadan, and their second release not to be a concept album, after 1998's On to Evermore. It is the first album to feature singer Susie Bogdanowicz after she joined as band member, and as such the first album to feature the band's longest and steadiest line-up, which would last until their tenth studio album, 2007's Culture of Ascent.

The Middle-Earth Album was jokingly marketed as a live album recorded during a performance at The Prancing Pony, a fictional inn in Bree in Lord of the Rings. The first half of the album (up to "The Man in the Wood") emulates the sound of an actual live performance at the inn, with an audience cheering and singing along as the band performs songs about the lore of Middle-earth; to capture the spirit of an actual band performing in Lord of the Rings, the album is much more folk and acoustic-oriented than other works of the band, and heavily features traditional instruments such as harpsichord, fiddle and recorder. The second half retains the same lyrical orientation, but is recorded as a traditional studio album, and features more progressive elements and electric instruments.

== Production ==
The lyrics of the album were written by Steve Babb, while Fred Schendel wrote the music.

In a 2010 interview, Babb referred to The Middle-Earth Album and 2009's Three Cheers for the Broken-Hearted as the Glass Hammer albums straying the most from the band's usual sound, stating, "we may throw the odd curve ball now and then."

== Track listing ==
All lyrics are written by Steve Babb; all music is composed by Fred Schendel.

No.	Title	Length
1.	"Elrenn and Endereth"	2:33
2.	"The Old Troll"	1:56
3.	"The Old Troll and the Maiden"	5:58
4.	"Dwarf and Orcs"	3:53
5.	"The King's Beer"	2:41
6.	"The Ballad of Balin Longbeard"	4:11
7.	"The Man in the Wood"	3:27
8.	"Mirkwood"	2:12
9.	"As I Walk"	2:34
10.	"The Last Ship"	2:41
11.	"Mithrandir (This Fading Age)"	5:08
12.	"Sweet Goldberry"	4:41
13.	"No Crown for Balin"	3:07
Total length:		45:02

== Personnel ==
Glass Hammer

- Fred Schendel – lead and backing vocals, main keyboards, guitars, mandolin, percussion, wind instruments
- Steve Babb – lead and backing vocals, bass guitar, additional keyboards, percussion
- Susie Bogdanowicz – lead vocals on "Mirkwood" and "Mithrandir (This Fading Age)", co-lead vocals on "The Last Ship"
- Walter Moore – lead vocals on "Sweet Goldberry"

Additional musicians

- Felicia Sorensen – lead vocals on "As I Walk"
- Sarah Snyder – co-lead vocals on "The Last Ship"
- Dr. Thomas Hammett – vocals
- Dr. David Luther – vocals
- Brad Marler – vocals
- Jamie Watkins – backing vocals
- Tim Starnes – fiddle
- Bob Stagner – extra percussion on "Mithrandir"

Production

- Fred Schendel, Steve Babb – production
- David Wyatt – cover art
