= Three Cheers for the Broken-Hearted =

Studio album by Glass Hammer
- Released: November 3, 2009
- Recorded: Sound Resources, Chattanooga, Tennessee
- Genre: Pop rock, progressive pop, progressive rock, soft rock
- Length: 51:45
- Label: Arion Records/Sound Resources
- Producer: Fred Schendel, Steve Babb

Glass Hammer chronology
Culture of Ascent (2007)	Three Cheers for the Broken-Hearted (2009)	If (2010)

Three Cheers for the Broken-Hearted is the tenth studio album by American progressive rock band Glass Hammer, released on November 3, 2009. It is their last album with Susie Bogdanowicz, as the band would replace her with new singer Jon Davison before the release, although she would return starting with 2014's Ode to Echo. It is also their first album as a trio since 2000's Chronometree, and their last to date.

A musical departure for the band, it is a pop rock album with much less progressive elements than all their previous and following works. Three Cheers for the Broken-Hearted was originally conceived as a solo album for Steve Babb, until Fred Schendel convinced him to make it a Glass Hammer release instead. As the result, the album received mixed-to-negative reception from the fans of the band; although Babb and Schendel always defended the album, they later recognized that they should not have released it under the Glass Hammer moniker.

== Production ==
The album was originally conceived by Babb as a solo album which would feature Bogdanowicz on vocals, but Schendel convinced him to make it a Glass Hammer album due to really liking it.

== Reception ==
Three Cheers for the Broken-Hearted divided the fans of the band due to its pop-oriented songs, with Babb recognizing that the album was "fairly unappreciated by the majority of our fans".

Despite this, Schendel and Babb always defended the album. Schendel stated "I love the album. I tend to think that as time goes by and people see it wasn't a complete shift in direction for us they will relax and it will grow on them for what it is, which is hopefully a collection of really good songs." Schendel stated "We took a chance. Some of our fans were wholeheartedly behind it, others remain lukewarm. [...] Critics of Glass Hammer had commented more than once in the past that our song writing wasn’t as focused as it should or could be. So, we focused it and took a beating from the same critics! Regardless of what anyone said about it or about any other album we’ve done, we always make the album we want to make. We’ll stand behind Three Cheers."

== Track listing ==
All tracks are written by Steve Babb and Fred Schendel, except where noted.

No.	Title	Writer(s)	Length
1.	"Come On, Come On"		3:36
2.	"The Lure of Dreams"		5:50
3.	"A Rose for Emily"	Rod Argent	3:08
4.	"Sleep On"		4:02
5.	"The Mid-Life Weird"		3:54
6.	"A Bitter Wind"		4:31
7.	"The Curse They Weave"		4:27
8.	"Sundown Shores"		4:34
9.	"Schrodinger's Lament"		5:09
10.	"Hyperbole"		7:34
11.	"Falling"		4:34

== Personnel ==
Glass Hammer

- Susie Bogdanowicz – lead and backing vocals
- Fred Schendel – keyboards, Mellotron, guitars, drums, cello, horns, lead and backing vocals
- Steve Babb – bass, keyboards, guitars, lead and backing vocals

Additional musicians

- Josh Bates – guitar (tracks 1 and 6)
- David Wallimann – guitar (track 4)

Production

- Fred Schendel and Steve Babb – production
