= The Breaking of the World =

Studio album by Glass Hammer
- Released: March 31, 2015
- Recorded: 2014, Sound Resources, Chattanooga, Tennessee
- Genre: Progressive rock, symphonic rock
- Length: 1:04:16
- Label: Arion Records/Audio Resources
- Producer: Fred Schendel, Steve Babb

Glass Hammer chronology
Ode to Echo (2014)	The Breaking of the World (2015)	Valkyrie (2016)

The Breaking of the World is the fifteenth studio album by American progressive rock band Glass Hammer, released on March 31, 2015. It is the band's first album since the departure of vocalist Jon Davison, who left in 2014 to concentrate on his efforts in Yes.

== Track listing ==
No.	Title	Lyrics	Music	Lead vocals	Length
1.	"Mythopoeia"	Steve Babb	Babb, Alan Shikoh	Carl Groves	8:34
2.	"Third Floor ("A Play in One Act")"	Fred Schendel	Shikoh, Schendel	Schendel, Susie Bogdanowicz	11:03
3.	"Babylon"	Schendel	Babb	Groves	7:55
4.	"A Bird When it Sneezes"	Instrumental	Shikoh	Instrumental	0:34
5.	"Sand"	Schendel	Schendel	Groves	5:46
6.	"Bandwagon"	Groves	Schendel	Groves	6:19
7.	"Haunted"	Groves	Schendel	Bogdanowicz, Michele Lynn	5:51
8.	"North Wind"	Babb	Shikoh	Groves	9:25
9.	"Nothing, Everything"	Babb	Babb	Groves	8:49
Total length:					1:04:16

== Personnel ==
Glass Hammer

- Carl Groves – lead vocals
- Susie Bogdanowicz – lead and backing vocals
- Fred Schendel – keyboards, guitars, lead vocals and backing vocals
- Alan Shikoh – electric, acoustic and classical guitars
- Steve Babb – bass, keyboards, backing vocals
- Aaron Raulston – drums

Production

- Fred Schendel and Steve Babb – producing
- Bob Katz - mastering
- Michal Xaay Loranc - cover art, booklet art

Additional musicians

- Steve Unruh - violin on “Bandwagon”, flute on “Babylon”
- Michele Lynn - lead vocals on “Haunted” bridge, backing vocals on “Third Floor”
