= Cool Air =

1926 short story by H. P. Lovecraft

- Short story by H. P. Lovecraft
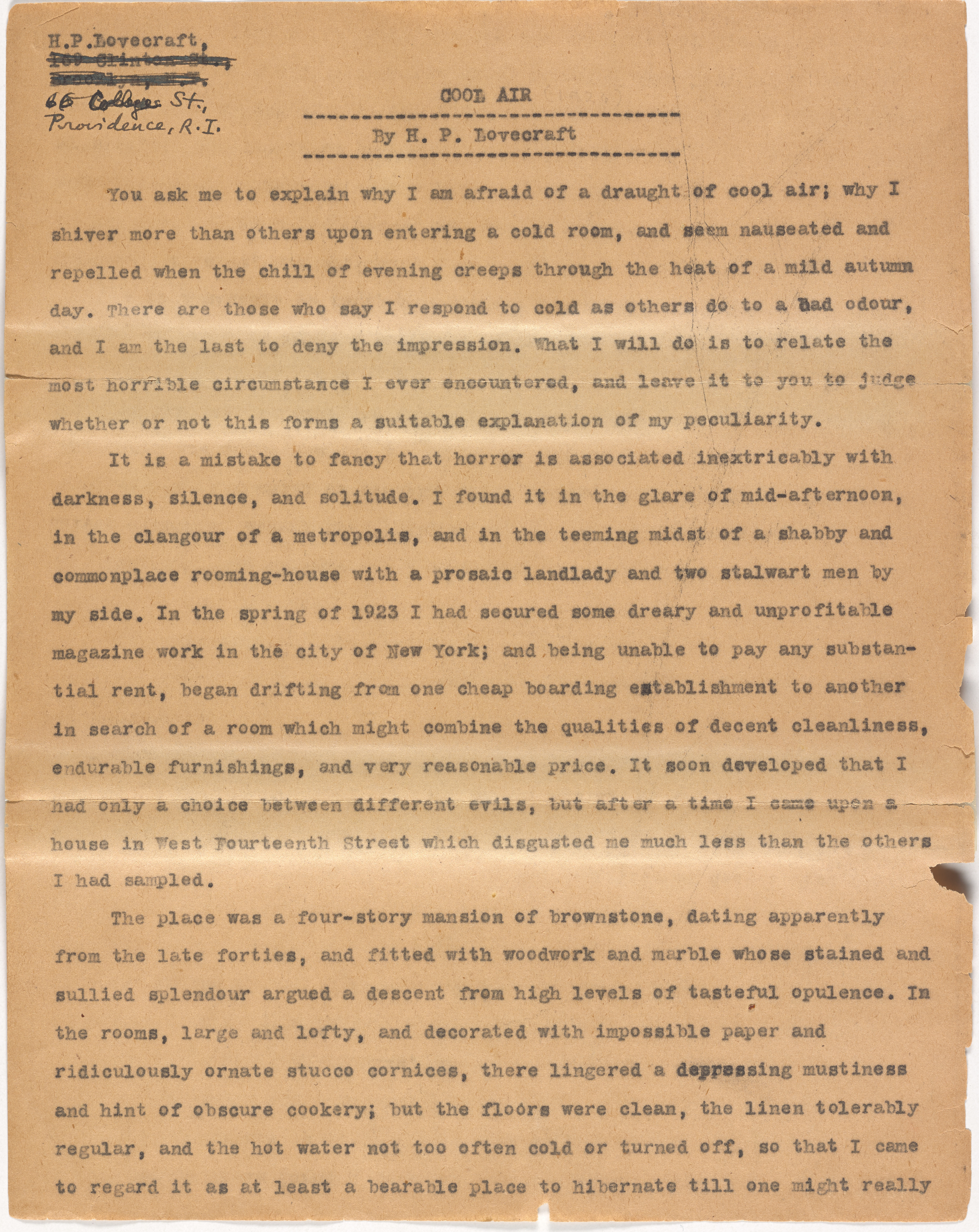

Text available at Wikisource
- Country: United States
- Language: English
- Genres: Horror short story, Science fiction

Publication
- Published in: Tales of Magic and Mystery
- Publication type: Periodical
- Media type: Print (magazine)
- Publication date: March 1928

"Cool Air" is a short story by the American horror fiction writer H. P. Lovecraft, written in March 1926 and published in the March 1928 issue of Tales of Magic and Mystery.

== Plot ==
The narrator offers a story to explain why a "draught of cool air" is the most detestable thing to him. His tale begins in the spring of 1923, when he was looking for housing in New York City. He finally settles in a converted brownstone on West Fourteenth Street. Investigating a chemical leak from the floor above, he discovers that the inhabitant directly overhead is a strange, old, and reclusive physician. One day the narrator suffers a heart attack, and remembering that a doctor lives overhead, he climbs the stairs and meets Dr. Muñoz for the first time.

The doctor demonstrates supreme medical skill, and saves the narrator with a combination of medications. The fascinated narrator returns regularly to sit and learn from the doctor. As their talks continue, it becomes increasingly evident that the doctor has an obsession with defying death through all available means.

The doctor's room is kept at approximately 56 degrees Fahrenheit (13 degrees Celsius) using an ammonia-based refrigeration system; the pumps are driven by a gasoline engine. As time goes on, the doctor's health declines and his behaviour becomes increasingly eccentric. The cooling system is continuously upgraded, to the point where some areas of his rooms are sub-freezing, until one night when the pump breaks down.

Without explanation, the panic-stricken doctor frantically implores his friend to help him keep his body cool. Unable to repair the machine until morning, they resort to having the doctor stay in a tub full of ice. The narrator spends his time replenishing the ice, but soon is forced to employ someone else to do it. When he finally locates competent mechanics to repair the pump, it is too late.

He arrives at the apartment in time to see the rapidly decomposing remains of the doctor, and a rushed, "hideously smeared" letter. The narrator reads it; to his horror, he learns that Dr. Muñoz died 18 years previously. Refusing to surrender to death, he maintained the semblance of life past the point of death using various methods, depending upon refrigeration to slow decomposition.

== Inspiration ==
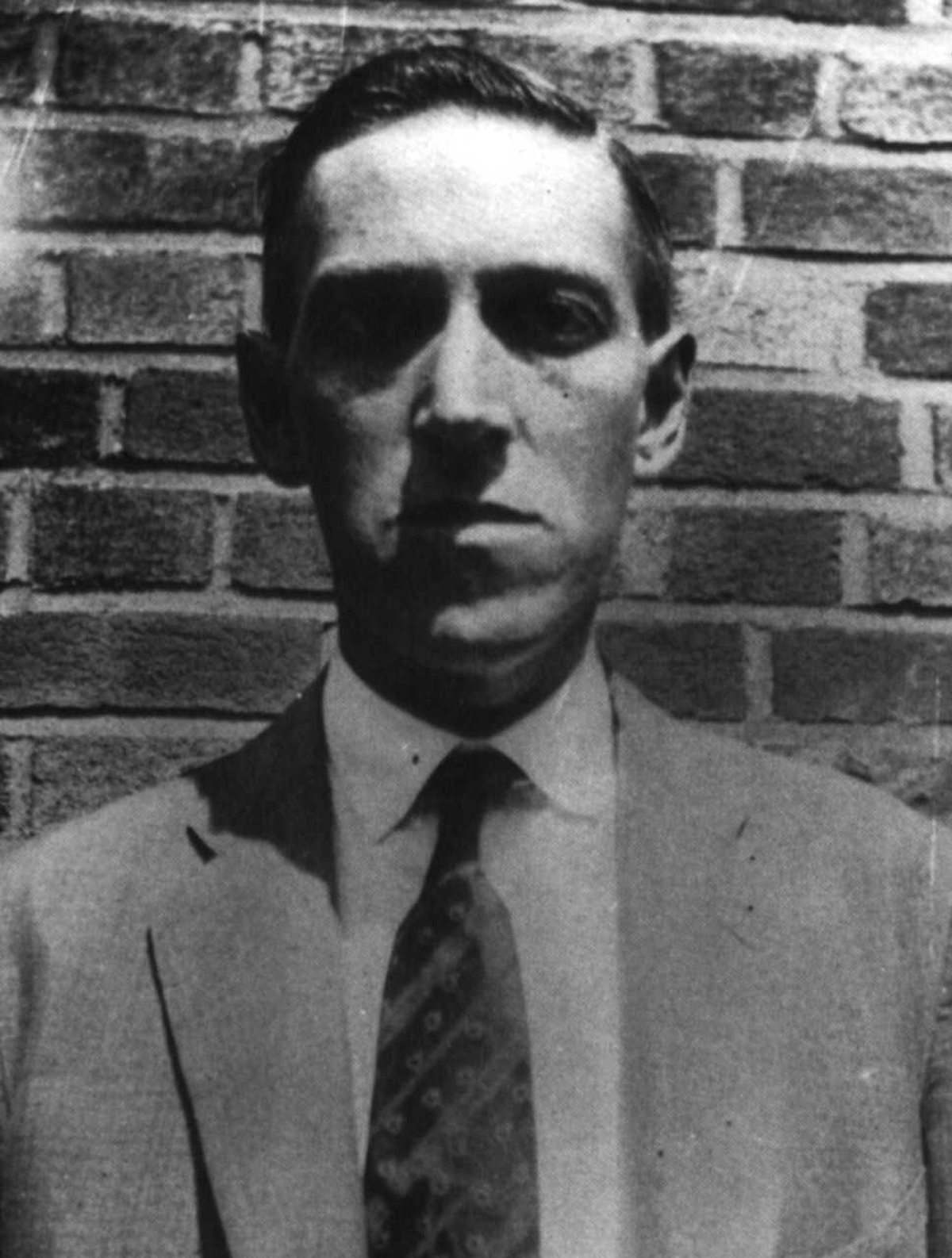
H. P. Lovecraft in Brooklyn, July 11, 1931

Lovecraft wrote "Cool Air" during his unhappy stay in New York City, during which he wrote three horror stories with a New York setting. In "Lovecraft's New York Exile," David E. Schultz cites the contrast Lovecraft felt between his apartment, crammed with relics of his beloved New England, and the immigrant neighborhood of Red Hook near where he lived as an inspiration for the "unsettling juxtaposition of opposites" that characterizes the short story. Like the story's main character, Schultz suggests, Lovecraft, cut off from his native Providence, Rhode Island, felt himself to be just going through the motions of life.

The building that is the story's main setting is based on a townhouse at 317 West 14th Street where George Kirk, one of Lovecraft's few New York friends, lived briefly in 1925. The narrator's heart attack recalls that of another New York Lovecraft friend, Frank Belknap Long, who dropped out of New York University because of his heart condition. The narrator's phobia about cool air is reminiscent of Lovecraft himself, who was abnormally sensitive to cold.

Schultz indicates that "Cool Air"'s main literary source is Edgar Allan Poe's "The Facts in the Case of M. Valdemar," described as Lovecraft's favourite Poe story after "The Fall of the House of Usher." Lovecraft had just finished the Poe chapter of his survey "Supernatural Horror in Literature" at the time that he wrote the short story. Lovecraft, however, stated years later that the story that inspired "Cool Air" was Arthur Machen's "The Novel of the White Powder," another tale of bodily disintegration.

== Characters ==
- Doctor Muñoz: A Spanish physician of "striking intelligence and superior blood and breeding," he is described as "short but exquisitely proportioned," with a "high-bred face of masterful though not arrogant expression," "a short iron-grey full beard," "full, dark eyes" and "an aquiline nose." He calls himself "the bitterest of sworn enemies to death", and one who had "sunk his fortune and lost all his friends in a lifetime of bizarre experiment devoted to its bafflement and extirpation." Saying he feels a "repugnance" on first meeting Muñoz that "nothing in his aspect could justify," the narrator remarks on "the ice-coldness and shakiness of his bloodless looking hands" and that his breathing was imperceptible.

An H. P. Lovecraft Encyclopaedia suggests that Muñoz may have been modelled on Lovecraft's Brooklyn neighbour, described by Lovecraft as "the fairly celebrated Dr. Love, State Senator and sponsor of the famous 'Clean Books bill' at Albany...evidently immune or unconscious of the decay." This is presumably William L. Love, a Brooklyn physician and freemason who was a state senator from 1923 until 1932.

- The unnamed narrator who has come to New York to do "some dreary and unprofitable magazine work." He has drifted from one cheap boarding house to another before finding that the one on West Fourteenth Street "disgusted [him] much less than the others he had sampled." After being treated by Muñoz, his upstairs neighbor, he becomes "a disciple and devotee of the gifted recluse".

== Reception ==
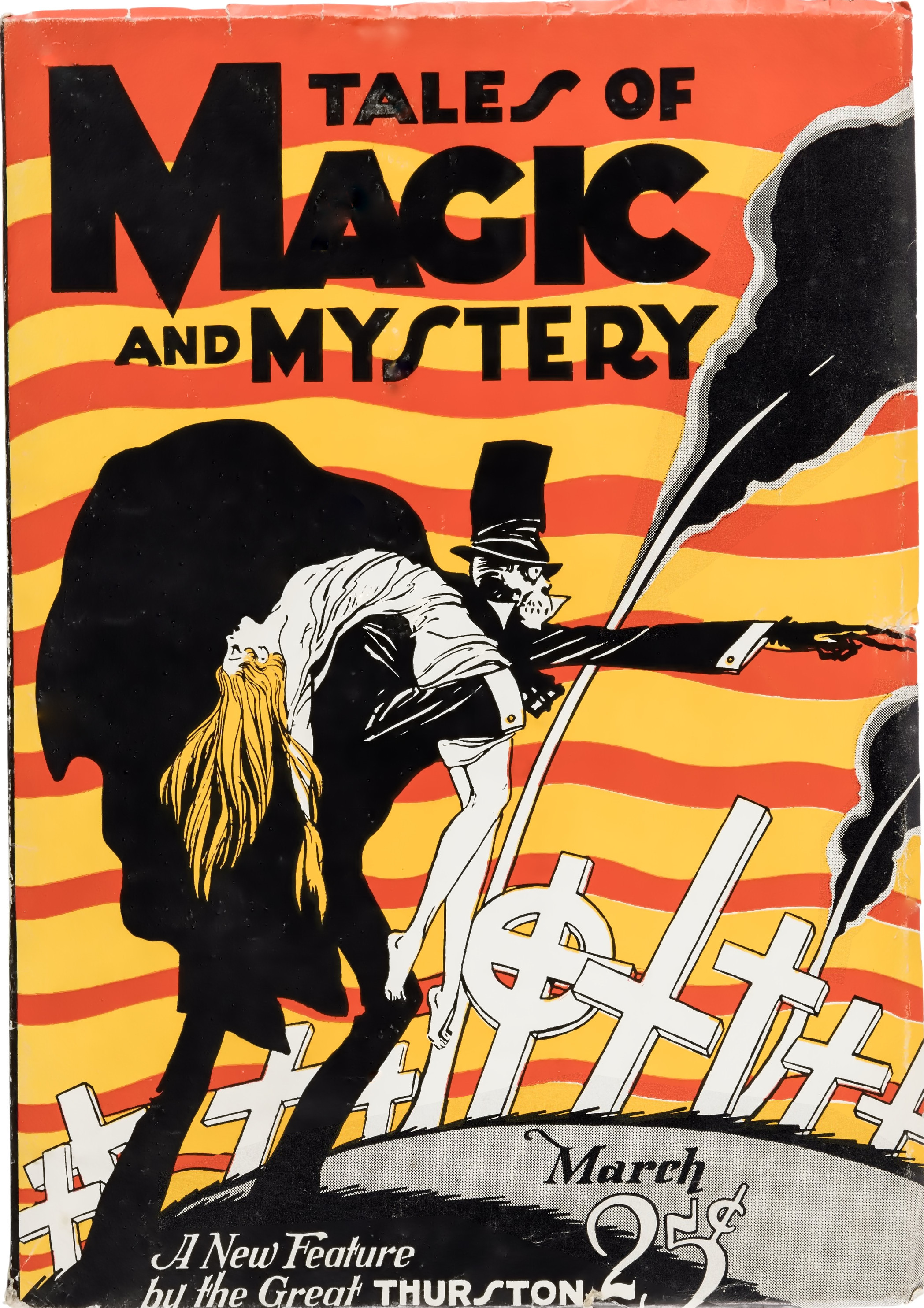
Issue of Tales of Magic and Mystery that Cool Air first appeared in, March 1928.

Submitted to Lovecraft's regular outlet, the pulp magazine Weird Tales, "Cool Air" was rejected by editor Farnsworth Wright, a decision that has been called "inexplicable...since it would appear to be just the sort of safe, macabre tale that he liked." It's possible that Wright feared that "its gruesome conclusion would invite censorship." The story was reprinted in Weird Tales in 1939.

Peter Cannon calls "Cool Air" Lovecraft's "best story with a New York setting", proving him "capable of using an understated, naturalistic style to powerful effect."

== Adaptations ==
- Issue #62 of Warren Publishing's Eerie features a comic adaptation of "Cool Air" by Bernie Wrightson. It was later reprinted several times, first by Warren, then by Pacific Comics.
- The story "Baby... It's Cold Inside!" in EC Comics's Vault of Horror #17 is a loose comic adaptation of "Cool Air."
- "Cool Air" has been adapted for film or television at least three times:
  - a 1971 episode of Night Gallery directed by Jeannot Szwarc with a teleplay by Rod Serling (where the narrator was changed to the daughter of a MIT colleague of Muñoz's, in order to accommodate a romantic plot for the story)
  - "The Cold", directed by Shusuke Kaneko from a screenplay by Brent V. Friedman, a segment of the 1994 Lovecraftian omnibus film Necronomicon: Book of the Dead
  - a 50-minute black-and-white version directed by Bryan Moore (where the nameless narrator of the story is replaced by Randolph Carter), released in 1999 as part of the H.P. Lovecraft Collection.
- The 2007 horror/splatter film Chill directed by Serdge Rodnunsky is loosely based on "Cool Air."
- DC Comics' Elseworlds three-part story, Batman: The Doom That Came to Gotham (2000), adapted the character of Mr. Freeze into a role inspired by Dr. Muñoz of "Cool Air".
- Blue Hours Productions has done an adaptation of "Cool Air" for its revival of the classic radio series Suspense, which began airing on Sirius XM Radio in Fall 2012. It features Adrienne Wilkinson and Daamen Krall, and was adapted by John C. Alsedek and Dana Perry-Hayes.
- Lions Gate released (on May 21, 2013) an adaptation by Albert Pyun from a script by Cynthia Curnan. The film was entitled H. P. Lovecraft's Cool Air.
- The song "Cool Air" by American progressive rock band Glass Hammer is based on the story. It was originally released as a part of a 2012 collaborative album dedicated to Lovecraft titled The Stories of H.P. Lovecraft, and then as a part of their 2017 album Untold Tales.
- The first issue of Alan Moore's comic Providence draws heavily from "Cool Air".

== Sources ==
- H. P. Lovecraft, "Cool Air", The Dunwich Horror and Others, Sauk City, WI: Arkham House, pp. 203–207.
- Lovecraft, "Cool Air", More Annotated Lovecraft, S. T. Joshi and Peter Cannon, eds., New York: Dell, pp. 158–171.
- David E. Schultz, "Lovecraft's New York Exile", Black Forbidden Things, Mercer Island, WA: Starmount House, p. 55.
