= Shadowlands (Glass Hammer album) =

Studio album by Glass Hammer
- Released: January 14, 2004
- Recorded: 2003
- Genre: Progressive rock, symphonic rock, neo-prog
- Length: 58:11
- Label: Arion Records/Sound Resources

Glass Hammer chronology
Lex Rex (2002)	Shadowlands (2004)	The Inconsolable Secret (2005)

Shadowlands is the seventh studio album by American progressive rock band Glass Hammer, released on January 14, 2004, by Arion Records/Sound Resources.

It is the last album with band founders Fred Schendel and Steve Babb acting as lead vocalists until Valkyrie, and the last album with Schendel acting as drummer.

== Track listing ==
No.	Title	Length
1.	"So Close, So Far"	9:50
2.	"Run Lisette"	10:30
3.	"Farewell to Shadowlands"	7:30
4.	"Longer"	9:55
5.	"Behind the Great Beyond"	20:26

Longer is a cover of Dan Fogelbergs song Longer.

== Personnel ==
Glass Hammer

- Fred Schendel – lead and backing vocals, steel, electric and acoustic guitars, Hammond Organ, piano, pipe organ, keyboards, synthesizers, Mellotron, drums, percussion
- Steve Babb – lead and backing vocals, 4-string and 8-string bass guitars, synthesizers, keyboards, pipe organ, Hammond organ, taurus pedels, Mellotron, percussion
- Susie Bogdanowicz – lead and backing vocals
- Walter Moore – lead and backing vocals

Additional musicians

- Sarah Snyder – Backing vocals
- Flo Paris – lead vocals on "So Close, So Far"
- Bethany Warren – backing vocals on "Run Lisette"
