= Perelandra (disambiguation) =

Perelandra can refer to:

- Perelandra, the second novel in C. S. Lewis's Space Trilogy. The name refers to the planet Venus
- Perelandra, an opera by Donald Swann and David Marsh, based on the novel
- "Perelandra", the title of a song by Circle of Dust
- Perelandra (album), a 1995 album by Glass Hammer
- Perelandra, an album by Kevin Braheny (Hearts of Space Records, HS001T)
