= Perilous =

Studio album by Glass Hammer
- Released: October 23, 2012
- Recorded: 2012 at Sound Resources, Chattanooga, Tennessee
- Genre: Progressive rock, symphonic rock, art rock
- Length: 57:36
- Label: Arion Records/Sound Resources
- Producer: Steve Babb and Fred Schendel

Glass Hammer chronology
| Cor Cordium (2011) | Perilous (2012) | Ode to Echo (2014) |

Perilous is the thirteenth studio album by American progressive rock band Glass Hammer, released on October 23, 2012, by Arion Records/Sound Resources.

This is the last album with Jon Davison acting as sole lead vocalist, with former vocalists Susie Bogdanowicz and Carl Groves returning on the following album. The song titles, when read in sequence, form a short poem. It is the first album featuring Davison in which he was not involved in the writing process, as he joined Yes earlier in the year and was not available for the songwriting sessions.

As with previous albums Journey of the Dunadan or Chronometree, Perilous is a concept album. However band member Steve Babb stated "we have never done a concept album like Perilous. It is essentially one unified vision; one musical idea in thirteen parts or movements. The emotions and ideas expressed in the lyrics ebb and flow with the music; but they have a definite story to tell with a beginning, middle and climactic end."

== Concept ==
About the story of Perilous, Steve Babb stated "It should be obvious from the album art and the title Perilous that something dire is lurking just beyond that gate. Imagine two children lost in a cemetery at night and the unsavory characters they might meet as they try to find their way home. That is the setting for our allegory." However he stated that the listeners should interpret the ultimate meaning for themselves.

Professional ratings
Review scores
| Source | Rating |
|---|---|
| The Phantom Toolbooth | 4.5/5 stars |
| Sea of Tranquillity | 4.5/5 stars |
| Something Else! Reviews | (positive) |

== Track listing ==
All lyrics are written by Steve Babb; all music is composed by Babb, Fred Schendel and Alan Shikoh.

| No. | Title | Length |
|---|---|---|
| 1. | "The Sunset Gate" | 7:37 |
| 2. | "Beyond They Dwell" | 4:00 |
| 3. | "The Restless Ones" | 3:36 |
| 4. | "They Cast Their Spell" | 3:21 |
| 5. | "We Slept, we Dreamed" | 7:41 |
| 6. | "The Years Were Sped" | 2:57 |
| 7. | "Our Foe Revealed" | 6:27 |
| 8. | "Toward Home we Fled" | 6:47 |
| 9. | "As the Sun Dipped Low" | 1:32 |
| 10. | "The Wolf Gave Chase" | 1:59 |
| 11. | "We Fell at Last" | 1:55 |
| 12. | "In that Lonely Place" | 3:10 |
| 13. | "Where Sorrows Died and Came No More" | 6:34 |
| Total length: | | 57:36 |

== Personnel ==
Glass Hammer

- Jon Davison – lead vocals
- Fred Schendel – keyboards, guitars, backing vocals
- Steve Babb – bass, keyboards, backing vocals
- Alan Shikoh – electric, classical and acoustic guitars

Production

- Steve Babb and Fred Schendel – producing
- Bob Katz - mastering
- R. T. Adolfo - cover artwork
- Julie Babb – administration

Additional musicians

- Randall Williams – drums
- The Adonia String Trio
  - Rebecca James – violin
  - Susan Hawkins-Whitacre – viola
  - Rachel Hackenberger – cello
- Amber Fults - lead vocals in "In that Lonely Place"
- Carey Shinbaum - recorders, oboe
- Tim Wardle - additional backing vocals
- The McCallie School Guitar Choir (Bharath Venkatesh, Aaron Long, Ralston Hartness, Matthew Norris, Drew Shikoh and Charles Evans) - guitars
- The Chattanooga Girls Choir (Glory Larm, Laura Ayres, Brooke Pugsley, Kelsey Hodges, Katherine Stegal, Molly Stegall and Savannah Fanter) – choir
- Latin Choir (Stephanie Rumpza, Sarah Snyder, Kelly Luther, Dr. Thomas Hammett and Robert Waller) - choir
