= Lex Rex (album) =

Studio album by Glass Hammer
- Released: September 1, 2002
- Genre: Progressive rock, symphonic rock
- Length: 66:46
- Label: Arion, Sound Resources
- Producer: Steve Babb, Fred Schendel

Glass Hammer chronology
The Middle-Earth Album (2001)	Lex Rex (2002)	Shadowlands (2004)

Lex Rex is the sixth studio album by American progressive rock band Glass Hammer, released on September 1, 2002.

It is the first album of the band to be released with the same line-up as its predecessor. This line-up, consisting of Fred Schendel, Steve Babb, Susie Bogdanowicz and Walter Moore, would last until their tenth studio album, 2007's Culture of Ascent.

== Track listing ==
All tracks are written by Fred Schendel and Steve Babb.

No.	Title	Length
1.	"Good Evening"	0:51
2.	"Tales of the Great Wars"	10:42
3.	"One King"	6:07
4.	"Further Up and Further In"	15:13
5.	"Intermission"	1:08
6.	"Music for Four Hands (and Temporal Anomaly)"	2:19
7.	"A Cup of Trembling"	7:50
8.	"Centurion"	7:47
9.	"When We Were Young"	9:53
10.	"Goodnight"	1:11
11.	"Heroes and Dragons"	3:45
Total length:		66:46

== Personnel ==
Glass Hammer

- Fred Schendel – lead and backing vocals, steel guitars, electric and acoustic guitars, Hammond organ, piano, pipe organ, keyboards, synthesizers, Mellotron, mandolin, recorder, drums, percussion
- Steve Babb – lead and backing vocals, four and eight-string bass guitars, keyboards, pipe organ, Hammond organ, Mellotron
- Susie Bogdanowicz – lead vocals and backing vocals
- Walter Moore – lead and backing vocals

Additional musicians

- Sarah Lowell – lead and backing vocals
- Haley McGuire – lead and backing vocals
- Carrie Streets – backing vocals
- Bjorn Lynne – lead guitar on "Tales of the Great Wars"
- Charlie Shelton – lead guitar on "One King"
- David Carter – lead guitar on "Further Up and Further In"

Production

- Fred Schendel – producer
- Steve Babb – producer
- Rosana Azar – cover art
