= The Inconsolable Secret =

Studio album by Glass Hammer
- Released: July 12, 2005
- Genre: Progressive rock, symphonic rock
- Length: 98:50 (original version); 168:12 (with 2013 third disc)
- Label: Arion Records/Sound Resources

Glass Hammer chronology
Shadowlands (2004)	The Inconsolable Secret (2005)	Culture of Ascent (2007)

The Inconsolable Secret is the eighth studio album by American progressive rock band Glass Hammer, released on July 12, 2005, by Arion Records/Sound Resources.

It is the last album with singer Walter Moore as band member (though he would continue to collaborate with the band, including on 2014's Ode to Echo), and also the first without band leader Fred Schendel acting as drummer.

A special edition of the album was released on June 25, 2013, with an additional third disc featuring five songs entirely re-recorded by the band, with new members Jon Davison and Kamran Alan Shikoh on vocals and guitar respectively. The name "inconsolable secret" comes from C.S. Lewis's sermon, The Weight of Glory.

== Track listing ==
Disc One
No.	Title	Length
1.	"A Maker of Crowns"	15:21
2.	"The Knight of the North"	24:39

Disc Two
No.	Title	Length
1.	"Long and Long Ago"	10:23
2.	"The Morning She Woke"	5:36
3.	"Lirazel"	4:30
4.	"The High Place"	3:33
5.	"Morrigan's Song"	2:23
6.	"Walking Toward Doom"	2:06
7.	"Mog Ruith"	2:03
8.	"Through a Glass Darkly"	6:55
9.	"The Lady Waits"	5:26
10.	"The Mirror Cracks"	2:12
11.	"Having Caught a Glimpse"	13:23

Disc Three (2013 re-issue)
No.	Title	Length
1.	"Long and Long Ago"	10:23
2.	"The Morning She Woke"	5:36
3.	"A Maker of Crowns"	15:21
4.	"The Knight of the North"	24:39
5.	"Having Caught a Glimpse"	13:23

== Personnel ==
Glass Hammer

- Walter Moore – lead vocals
- Susie Bogdanowicz – lead vocals
- Fred Schendel – keyboards, electric and steel guitars, vocals
- Steve Babb – keyboards, bass, vocals

Additional musicians

- Matt Mendians – drums
- Sarah Snyder – vocals
- Flo Paris – vocals on “Long and Long Ago” and “Having Caught a Glimpse”
- Eric Parker – acoustic guitar
- The Adonia String Trio
  - Rebecca James – violin
  - Susan Hawkins-Whitacre – viola
  - Rachel Hackenberger – cello
- Bethany Warren – backing vocals and choir
- Stephanie Rumpza – recorder and choir, Latin and elvish (Quenya) lyrics
- Haley McGuire, Summer Hullender, Elimy Hammett and Natalie Pittman – choir
- Tom Hammett – vocals
- Laura Lindstrom – vocals on “Morrigan's Song”
- David Carter – lead guitar on "Long and Long Ago"

Production

- Fred Schendel and Steve Babb – production
- Bob Katz – mastering
- Roger Dean – cover art

New personnel in 2013 re-issue

- Jon Davison – lead vocals on "Long and Long Ago" and "The Morning She Woke"
- Kamran Alan Shikoh – electric and classical guitars on "The Morning She Woke" and "The Knight of the North"
- Johnny Bruhns – electric guitar on "Long And Long Ago"
- David Wallimann – electric guitar on "Having Caught A Glimpse"
- Donna Curry – flute on "Long And Long Ago" and "Having Caught A Glimpse"
- Kelly Luther Stultz – alto choir
- Josh Greene – baritone choir
