= Anyone =

Anyone may refer to:

- Anyone (band), a band from Southern California formed in 1995
- "Anyone" (Roxette song), a 1999 song by Roxette
- "Anyone" (Demi Lovato song), a 2020 song by Demi Lovato
- "Anyone" (Justin Bieber song), a 2021 song by Justin Bieber
- "Anyone", a 1971 song by Sophia Loren from the film The Priest's Wife
