= Cor Cordium =

Studio album by Glass Hammer
- Released: October 25, 2011
- Recorded: Sound Resources, Chattanooga, Tennessee
- Genre: Progressive rock, symphonic rock, art rock
- Length: 51:13
- Label: Arion Records/Sound Resources
- Producer: Fred Schendel and Steve Babb

Glass Hammer chronology
If (2010)	Cor Cordium (2011)	Perilous (2012)

Cor Cordium (Latin: "Heart of Hearts") is the twelfth studio album by American progressive rock band Glass Hammer. The name of the album is taken from the poem of the same name by Algernon Charles Swinburne.

The album follows the symphonic-progressive musical direction of the previous album If after the arrival of singer Jon Davison and guitarist Alan Shikoh.

== Production ==
=== Songwriting ===
Although all the songs on Cor Cordium have their music credited to Steve Babb, Fred Schendel, Jon Davison and Alan Shikoh and all their lyrics to Babb, Schendel and Davison, Babb and Schendel were more precise in an interview:

Schendel describes "Nothing Box" as "a more aggressive song overall while keeping the verses very melodic". It was originally built around the electric piano riff of its verse. Babb wrote the lyrics of "One Heart" to comfort his wife, as her mother had only a few days left before her death. "She had been crippled for three years and was in tremendous pain, but she was a Christian (and the best mother-in-law a man could ask for!) and knew that she was heading home to Heaven." He stated that his wife still cries every time she hears the song.

"Salvation Station" and "Dear Daddy" were both mostly written by Davison. His original version of "Salvation Station" was an acoustic song featuring him only, on vocals and acoustic bass guitar. The band expanded it into a non-acoustic version featuring all members, with Babb adding "the middle break with the solos and the very Gentle Giant-y part". "Dear Daddy" was originally written and recorded by Davison in the early 1990s. According to Schendel, the lyrics "come from a far more personal place than we would ever normally get into." The final result is a mix of both Davison's original recording and new work.

"To Someone" was written by Schendel and Davison. Schendel stated "Basically, the instrumental parts are me and the vocal parts are Jon." The piano break in the middle of the song is based around the guitar intro of "Dear Daddy". The lyrics of "She, a Lonely Tower" were written by Davison. The music was mostly composed by Babb, with Schendel and Shikoh also adding sections. The song is about isolation, and trying to help a loved one break free of it. The first day Babb started to work on the song, both his studio and home in Tennessee were slammed by a tornado. "You just have to picture me sitting at the keyboard one moment, and in the next realizing a storm was coming. I quickly turned off all the computers – just in time. Seconds later – WHAM!. It was over in 60 seconds but it seemed a lifetime. Then…just two months later I was about to head to the studio again."

== Track listing ==
All lyrics are written by Steve Babb, Fred Schendel and Jon Davison; all music is composed by Babb, Schendel, Davison and Alan Shikoh.

No.	Title	Length
1.	"Nothing Box"	10:53
2.	"One Heart"	6:20
3.	"Salvation Station"	5:08
4.	"Dear Daddy"	10:30
5.	"To Someone"	18:15
6.	"She, a Lonely Tower"	10:57

== Personnel ==
Glass Hammer

- Jon Davison – lead vocals, acoustic guitars
- Fred Schendel – keyboards, steel and acoustic guitars, backing vocals
- Steve Babb – bass, keyboards, backing vocals
- Alan Shikoh – acoustic, electric and classical guitars, electric sitar

Additional musicians

- Randall Williams – drums
- Jeffrey Sick – violin on "Dear Daddy"
- Ed Davis – viola on "Dear Daddy"

Production

- Fred Schendel and Steve Babb – production
- Tom Kuhn – cover artwork
- Bob Katz – mastering
- Daylon Walden – co-production and engineering on "Dear Daddy"
- Julie Babb – Administration, band photography
