= K-system =

Audio level measuring technique

The K-system dB scale.

The K-system is an audio level measuring technique proposed by mastering engineer Bob Katz in the paper "An integrated approach to Metering, Monitoring and Levelling". It proposes a studio monitor calibration system and a set of meter ballistics to help engineers produce consistent sounding music while preserving appropriate dynamic range.
