= Chronomonaut =

Studio album by Glass Hammer
- Released: October 12, 2018
- Recorded: May 4–July/August 2018
- Genre: Progressive rock
- Length: 1:10:30
- Label: Arion Records/Audio Resources
- Producer: Fred Schendel, Steve Babb

Glass Hammer chronology
Valkyrie (2016)	Chronomonaut (2018)	Dreaming City (2020)

Chronomonaut is the seventeenth studio album by American progressive rock band Glass Hammer, released on October 12, 2018.

A concept album and sequel to the band's fourth album Chronometree (2000), it features the same character, Tom Timely, now struggling to reach success with his progressive rock band The Elf King in the eighties. It was conceived as a stand-alone story rather than a direct continuation of the earlier album.

== Story ==
The album follows Tom Timely in the 1980s, after the events of Chronometree. Now the member of a progressive rock band named The Elf King. Together with his bandmates, which include guitarist Dwight -who often misses rehearsals- and vocalist Arianna, Tom tries to reach success and become a "prog god"; the story also involves him travelling back in the time to the golden age of progressive rock in the 1970s, and going missing.

== Reception ==
Progradar stated "Glass Hammer make a bold new statement with Chronomonaut’, a new direction that gives them a definitive sound of their own. [...] While not completely straying from their roots, Glass Hammer have taken a path less trodden and delivered what is, without a doubt, their best album yet and a fantastic new direction of power, precision and downright soul." Roie Avin of The Prog Report called the album "a progressive psychedelic trip with a captivating story and enough twists and turns to keep you guessing throughout. 25 years into their career Glass Hammer continue to take risks and the result here is another gem in their impressive catalog."

Brad Birzer of Progarchy stated "I could review this as a distinctive piece of American culture and Americana; as a treasure hunt and quest; as a progressive rock album; as a philosophical examination of nostalgia; as a theological pondering on the nature of time; or as a fully-blown science fiction tale worthy of anything written by Robert Heinlein or Kevin J. Anderson. In some way, no review of this album can really be faithful to the material if it doesn’t take into account all of these things.", and called Chronomonaut "a majestic album that calls forth all that is best within us. No small feat, especially in our present cultural whirligig of insanity and horrors. In its own madness, Chronomonaut brings order and truth to the artistic and longing soul."

Italian magazine La Gazzetta dello Spettacolo stated "With this new CD Glass Hammer reassert themselves as one of the most interesting and praiseworthy prog rock bands in the world, able to thrill the fans with their music, which is inspired by that of the greats of the genre, but is also rich in various personal inspirations".

== Track listing ==
No.	Title	Writer(s)	Length
1.	"The Land of Lost Content"	Fred Schendel	1:54
2.	"Roll for Initiative"	Steve Babb	7:43
3.	"Twilight of the Godz"	Babb	8:13
4.	"The Past is Past"	Schendel	9:56
5.	"1980 Something"	Babb	5:51
6.	"A Hole in the Sky"	Babb	4:47
7.	"Clockwork"	Schendel	2:17
8.	"Melancholy Holiday"	Babb	4:27
9.	"It Always Burns Sideways"	Schendel	5:49
10.	"Blinding Light"	Babb	6:01
11.	"Tangerine Meme"	Babb	3:05
12.	"Fade Away"	Schendel	10:27
Total length:			1:10:30

== Personnel ==
Glass Hammer

- Susie Bogdanowicz – lead vocals
- Steve Babb – bass, keyboards
- Fred Schendel – keyboards, guitars
- Aaron Raulston – drums

Production

- Fred Schendel, Steve Babb – production
- Bob Katz - mastering
- Michal Xaay Loranc - cover art, booklet art

Additional musicians

- Brian Brewer – guitar on "Twilight of the Godz"
- Jamison Smeltz – saxophone
- Matthew Parmenter – vocals on "The Past is Past"
- Chris Herin – guitar
- Reese Boyd – guitar solo on "Fade Away"
- Phil Stiles - guitar on "It Always Burns Sideways"
