= Cool Air (film) =

- DVD cover
- Directed by: Bryan Moore
- Written by: H. P. Lovecraft
- Based on: "Cool Air" by H. P. Lovecraft
- Produced by: Ted Newsom; Andrew Migliore
- Starring: Bryan Moore; Jack Donner; Vera Lockwood
- Cinematography: Michael Bratkowski
- Music by: Steve Yeaman
- Distributed by: Lurker Films; Beyond Books
- Release date: October 15, 1999 (H.P. Lovecraft Film Festival)
- Running time: 50 minutes
- Country: United States
- Language: English

Cool Air is a 1999 black-and-white horror film directed by and starring Bryan Moore, and co-starring Jack Donner, with cinematography by Michael Bratkowski. It is based on the short story "Cool Air" by H. P. Lovecraft. This film is the start of a multi-volume series called The H.P. Lovecraft Collection. The series is supposed to feature the best of the films submitted at the H.P. Lovecraft Film Festival.

== Plot ==
In the 1920s, impoverished horror writer Randolph Carter rents a room from Mrs. Caprezzi, an elderly landlady. Not long after settling into the shabby and almost bare room, he discovers a pool of ammonia on the floor that has leaked down from the room above. Mrs. Caprezzi, while cleaning up the ammonia, regales Randolph with strange stories of Dr. Muñoz (Jack Donner), the eccentric old gentleman who lives in the room upstairs. Later, Randolph suffers a heart attack and painfully makes his way to the doctor's room where he is treated with an unconventional medicine and makes a remarkable recovery. Befriending the doctor, Carter soon discovers the awful truth about the doctor's condition, why his room is kept intensely cold, and the fragile line that separates life and death.

== Cast ==
- Bryan Moore as Randolph Carter
- Jack Donner as Doctor Muñoz
- Vera Lockwood as Mrs. Caprezzi
- Dukey Flyswatter as Street Bum
- Ron Ford as Repairman

== Production ==
Cool Air was filmed on location in Glendale, California, USA over several weekends, using a CP-16R regular 16mm camera package owned by DP Michael Bratkowski. The film was shot on Ilford Black and White regular 16mm film stock.
