= Perelandra (album) =

Studio album by Glass Hammer
- Released: November 1, 1995
- Genre: Art rock, progressive rock
- Length: 61:54
- Label: Arion Records/Sound Resources
- Producer: Steve Babb; Fred Schendel

Glass Hammer chronology
Journey of the Dunadan (1993)	Perelandra (1995)	On to Evermore (1998)

Perelandra is the second studio album by American progressive rock band Glass Hammer, released on November 1, 1995.

A concept album, it was inspired by C. S. Lewis' The Chronicles of Narnia and Space Trilogy book series. It is the only album to feature singer Michelle Young as band member, although she had appeared on their first album Journey of the Dunadan and would later appear on their fourteenth Ode to Echo in 2014, both as a guest.

== Track listing ==
No.	Title	Length
1.	"Now Arriving"	2:02
2.	"Time Marches On"	10:36
3.	"Lliusion"	9:05
4.	"The Way to Her Heart"	4:47
5.	"Felix the Cat"	2:31
6.	"Now Departing"	1:05
7.	"Perelandra"	8:07
8.	"Le Danse Final"	5:18
9.	"That Hideous Strength"	3:57
10.	"Enda the Lion"	1:02
11.	"Into the Night"	4:40
12.	"Heaven"	8:37

== Personnel ==
Glass Hammer

- Fred Schendel – Lead and backing vocals, keyboards, acoustic and electric guitars, drums, programming, Mellotron
- Steve Babb – lead and backing vocals, keyboards, bass, taurus pedals, Mellotron, zoominator, rhythm programming
- Walter Moore – lead vocals, 12-string acoustic guitar, mo-better electric guitar
- Michelle Young – lead vocals

Additional musicians

- Milton Hamerick – steel guitars
- Randy Burt – saxophone
- Tracy Cloud – backing vocals, spoken vocals
- David Carter – 12-string guitar on “Into the Night”
