= Valkyrie (album) =

Studio album by Glass Hammer
- Released: September 27, 2016
- Recorded: 2016, Sound Resources, Chattanooga, Tennessee
- Genre: Progressive rock, symphonic rock
- Label: Arion Records/Audio Resources
- Producer: Fred Schendel, Steve Babb

Glass Hammer chronology
The Breaking of the World (2015)	Valkyrie (2016)	Chronomonaut (2018)

Valkyrie is the sixteenth studio album by American progressive rock band Glass Hammer. It was released on September 27, 2016. It is the last studio album to feature guitarist Kamran Alan Shikoh.

It is the band's first concept album since 2012's Perilous; the story follows "a soldier's struggle to return home from the horrors of war, to the girl who loves him and must ultimately find her way to him."

== Track listing ==
No.	Title	Length
1.	"The Fields We Know"	7:37
2.	"Golden Days"	6:20
3.	"No Man's Land"	14:20
4.	"Nexus Girl"	2:58
5.	"Valkyrie"	5:54
6.	"Fog of War"	8:23
7.	"Dead and Gone"	9:56
8.	"Eucatastrophe"	3:31
9.	"Rapturo"	6:12

== Personnel ==
Glass Hammer

- Susie Bogdanowicz – lead vocals
- Alan Shikoh – electric, acoustic and classical guitars, electric sitar
- Steve Babb – bass, keyboards, lead vocals
- Fred Schendel – keyboards, guitars, lead vocals
- Aaron Raulston – drums

Production

- Fred Schendel and Steve Babb – producing
- Bob Katz – mastering
- Michal Xaay Loranc – cover art, booklet art
