= X-Panda =

Estonian musical group

- Origin: Tartu, Estonia
- Genres: progressive metal, fusion
- Years active: 2009–present
- Label: INDIE
- Members: Kaarel Tamra - keyboards Risto Virkhausen - guitars Karl-Juhan Laanesaar - drums Tamar Nugis - vocal Roland Jairus - bass guitar

X-Panda is a progressive metal and fusion band from Estonia. Their music is mainly instrumental but a few of their songs also include vocals. The band is known for energetic and powerful live shows.

== Biography ==
The band was founded as a project for a local song competition in Tartu in April 2009. The newly formed group won the competition with their song “Dickybirds”. The group went on to participate in the Estonian Noortebänd 2010 competition, an annual national competition for musical groups consisting of members that are younger than 26 years old. They won the competition, with their cover of the song Siren by Malcolm Lincoln, the Estonian representative in the Eurovision Song Contest 2010 in Oslo, Norway. Their critically acclaimed debut album Flight of Fancy (2011) was nominated album of the year in metal category of Estonian Music Awards. X-Panda has been performing at music festivals in Latvia, Finland and Lithuania. The band has played several times in the Netherlands: Progmotion festival in 2014 followed by concerts at Cultuurpodium Boerderij in Zoetermeer and W2 Poppodium in Den Bosch in 2015. X-Panda has released music videos for the songs „Revelation“ and „Slaves of Lies“. The band has collaborated with ESTuudio mixed choir, Tartu Youth Choir, Tallinn International Youth Orchestra.

== Concept ==
The style of X-Panda can be described as energetic and theatrical, it is both progressive while simultaneously accessible and catchy. Their music has a powerful melodic edge as well as a great metallic basis as well as jazz fusion hooks and enhancements - it is a mixture of progressive metal, fusion, industrial and motion picture soundtracks. Fusing different genres and using live visuals enables the band to create shows with wide spectrum of emotions and dynamics. The band is influenced by Dream Theater, Planet X, Virgil Donati, Simon Phillips, Joe Satriani, Porcupine Tree and Nightwish.

== Debut Album ==
X-Panda's debut album Flight of Fancy was released in September 2011 and it has been well received internationally by the critics in progressive music and metal genres. The album was nominated for the best metal album of the year at the Estonian Music Awards 2012.

X-Panda performed at the Progmotion Festival in 2013 in Uden.

In 2016 the second album was released, titled Reflections.
