= If (Glass Hammer album) =

Studio album by Glass Hammer
- Released: September 14, 2010
- Recorded: Sound Resources, Chattanooga, Tennessee
- Genre: Progressive rock, symphonic rock, art rock
- Length: 1:03:37
- Label: Arion Records/Sound Resources
- Producer: Fred Schendel and Steve Babb

Glass Hammer chronology
Three Cheers for the Broken-Hearted (2009)	If (2010)	Cor Cordium (2011)

If is the eleventh studio album by American progressive rock band Glass Hammer. It is the first album to feature singer Jon Davison and guitarist Alan Shikoh.

The album marks a transition to a more "symphonic-progressive rock" sound, accorded to the band. The cover art was made by artist Tom Kuhn and all drums were provided by session member Randall Williams.

== Track listing ==
All lyrics are written by Steve Babb, Fred Schendel and Jon Davison; all music is composed by Babb and Schendel.

No.	Title	Length
1.	"Beyond, Within"	11:44
2.	"Behold, The Ziddle"	9:11
3.	"Grace the Sky"	4:29
4.	"At Last We Are"	6:46
5.	"If the Stars"	10:25
6.	"If the Sun"	24:02

== Personnel ==
Glass Hammer

- Jon Davison – lead vocals
- Fred Schendel – keyboards, steel guitar, mandolin, backing vocals
- Alan Shikoh – guitars
- Steve Babb – bass, keyboards, backing vocals

Additional musicians

- Randall Williams – drums

Production

- Fred Schendel and Steve Babb – production
- Bob Katz – mastering
- Tom Kuhn – cover artwork
- Julie Babb – administration
