= Michelle Young (musician) =

American musician

Michelle Young is an American musician known for her work with the progressive rock group Glass Hammer. Citing Kate Bush as an influence, Young was professionally trained in classical voice at the University of Tennessee-Chattanooga. She left her job as a legal secretary and receptionist in 1996 to pursue her professional career as a female vocalist in progressive rock. A review of her album and a biography was published in the Fall 1996 issue of Progression magazine.

In 2013, she collaborated with Glass Hammer once again, performing backing vocals for their 2014 album Ode to Echo.

== Discography ==
=== Solo albums ===
- Song of the Siren (Naosha Records, 1996)
- Marked for Madness (Naosha Records, 2001)

=== Other ===
- Glass Hammer: Journey of the Dunadan (Arion, 1993)
- Glass Hammer: Perelandra (Arion, 1995)
- Greg White Hunt: Enter The Oriente (Bamboo Alchemy, 1996)
- Glass Hammer: Live & Revived (Arion, 1997)
- Greg White Hunt: Hidden Landscapes (Bamboo Alchemy, 1997)
- Greg White Hunt: Bamboo Rain (Bamboo Alchemy, 1998)
- L'homme du Nord: Kiwin Innu (ExCentric, 1998)
- Clive Nolan & Oliver Wakeman: Jabberwocky (Verglas Music, 1999)
- Rudi Buttas: R.U.D.Y.'s Journey (SB Records, 2001)
- Trent Gardner: Leonardo, The Absolute Man (Magna Carta, 2001)
- Clive Nolan & Oliver Wakeman: The Hound of the Baskervilles (Verglas Music, 2002)
- Glass Hammer: Ode to Echo (Arion, 2014)
