= Jon Davison =

American musician (born 1971)

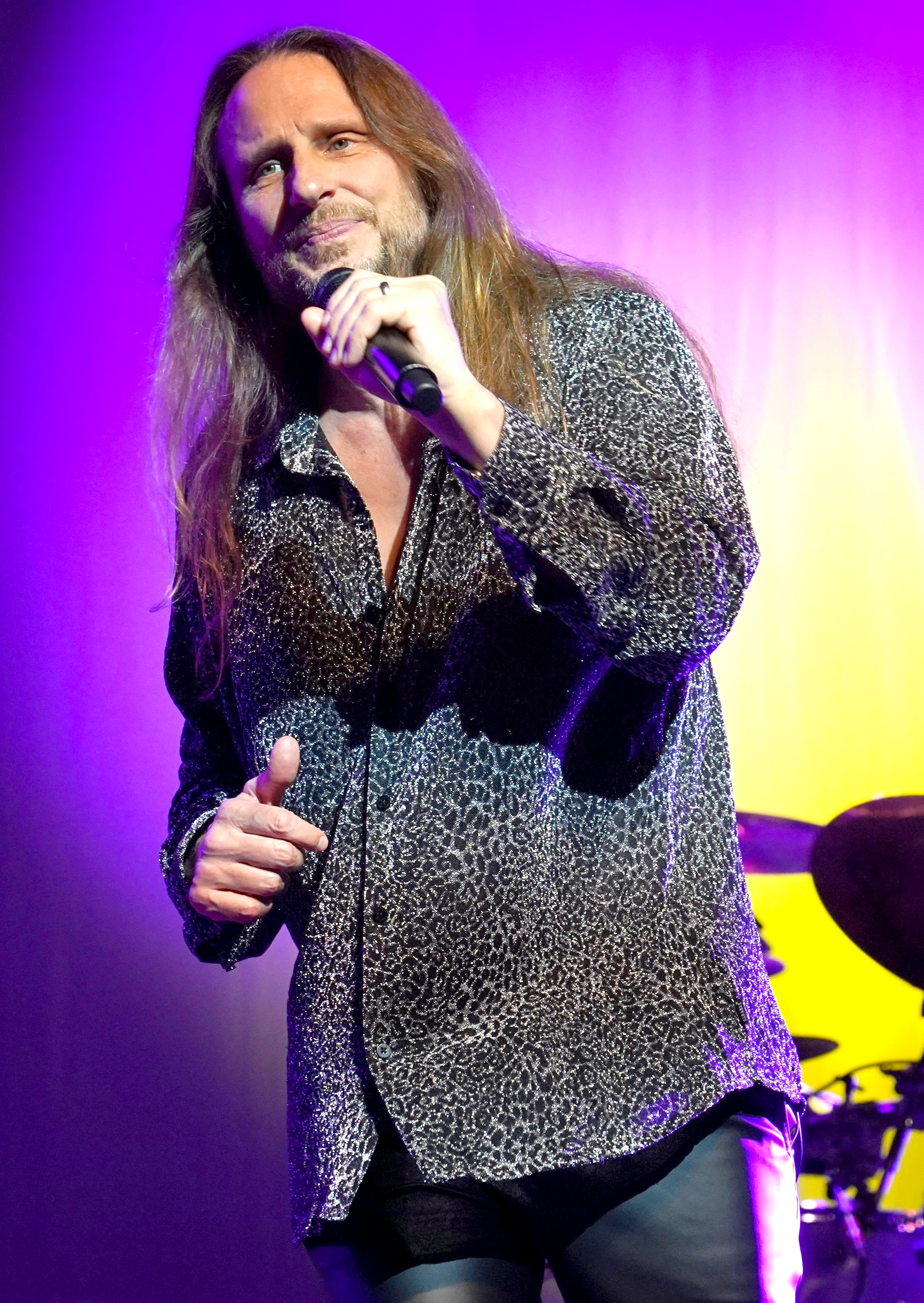
- Davison performing in 2024

Background information
- Also known as: Juano Davison
- Born: January 16, 1971 (age 55); Laguna Beach, California, U.S.
- Genres: Progressive rock; psychedelic rock; symphonic rock
- Occupations: Singer; musician; songwriter
- Instruments: Vocals; guitar; bass
- Years active: 1991–present
- Member of: Yes
- Formerly of: Glass Hammer; Sky Cries Mary; Arc of Life

Jon Davison (born January 16, 1971) is an American singer, musician and songwriter who has been the lead vocalist of progressive rock band Yes since 2012.

He was previously the lead singer of progressive rock band Glass Hammer from 2009 to 2014, and the bass guitarist of Sky Cries Mary from 1993 to 2016, in which he was credited under his nickname of "Juano" Davison. In 2020, he and fellow Yes member Billy Sherwood created a new band, Arc of Life, which released its eponymous first studio album the following year and its second album in 2022. Davison also worked regularly with his father-in-law John Lodge (of The Moody Blues) until Lodge's death in 2025.

== Career ==
=== Early years ===
Davison's earliest involvement with music began when he sang in the church youth choir led by his mother. From an early age, she instilled in him an appreciation for music and love for singing. Soon after, he took up guitar and bass, which eventually led him during high school to perform in various original and cover bands with his childhood best friend, Taylor Hawkins (who was later the drummer for Foo Fighters). It was Hawkins who gave Jon the nickname "Juano" that has stuck to this day.

=== Sky Cries Mary ===
Davison then attended the Art Institute of Seattle to study audio and video production, where he became bassist for Northwest group Sky Cries Mary. Throughout the 1990s, he continued recording and touring with the band. This included traveling to Japan, and appearing on late night talk shows including Late Night with Conan O'Brien and The Daily Show.

In 2001, Davison and his then wife Maewe moved for a year to her home of Brazil. While living there, Davison played bass with Ronald Augusto.

In November 26, 2016, Sky Cries Mary premiered a new line-up without Davison.

=== Glass Hammer ===
While still a member of Sky Cries Mary, Davison also joined the now-disbanded Yes tribute band Roundabout. In 2009, Glass Hammer discovered Davison singing Yes music online and asked him to join the band. He went on to record five albums with them, If, Cor Cordium, Perilous, a new version of The Inconsolable Secret and Ode to Echo. He was the lead vocalist on the first three, and sharing that role on Ode to Echo given his engagements with Yes; he subsequently left the band to focus on Yes.

On the 2018 Cruise to the Edge festival, Davison performed live with Glass Hammer as a guest; as Glass Hammer was mainly a studio project when he was a member, it marked the first time he performed with them live.

He guested on one track of Glass Hammer's 2022 album At the Gate.

=== Yes ===
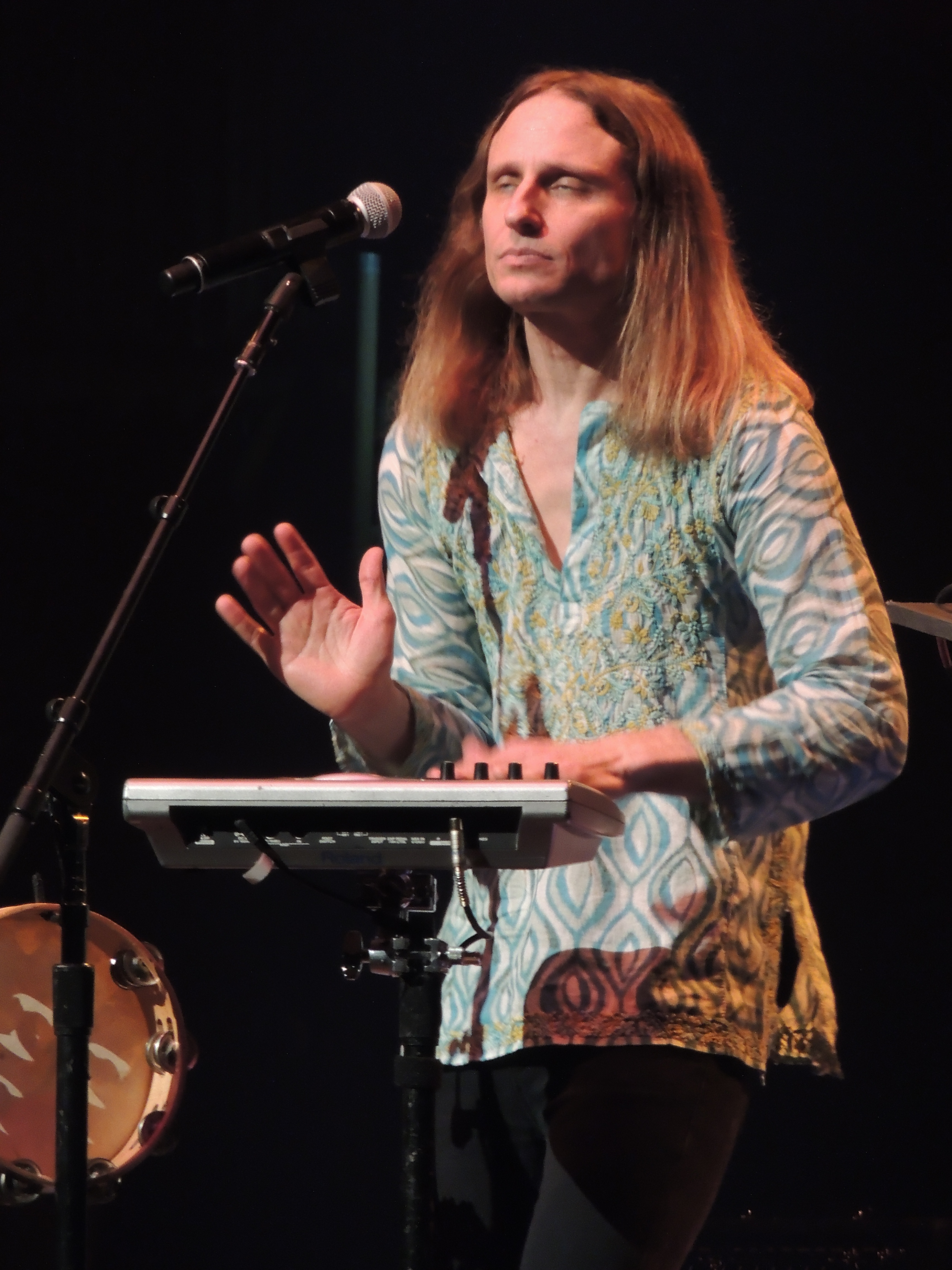
Davison performing in 2013

In February 2012, Davison was announced as the new lead singer of Yes, replacing Benoît David, who left the group because of illness. "Strangely enough, Jon's name came up when we started working with Benoit," Yes bassist Chris Squire recalled. "In fact, my friend, Taylor Hawkins, had been telling me for years: 'If you ever need a replacement (singer), I know exactly the guy.'" Davison has described how the band had a tour booked when David dropped out, "so there was sort of this frantic race to resolve this matter [...] because they weren't going to back out of the tour. So in the same moment, perhaps even the same hour, of the same day, Chris is calling Taylor to get my phone number, because he's gonna give me a call, and then the manager is also working on contacting me, so I got contacted by both of them."

Davison has toured with Yes since joining the band, and sang lead on 2014's studio album Heaven & Earth. He wrote or co-wrote seven out of the eight tracks.

In July 2020, Davison said the band were at work writing their next album, stating that it was still in the early stages of compiling demos, but the band has half an album of material ready. The Quest, Yes's second studio album to feature lead vocals by Davison, was released in October 2021. A third album, Mirror to the Sky, was released in May 2023, followed by Aurora in Jun 2026.

=== Work with John Lodge ===
In February 2019, during the Cruise to the Edge music cruise, Davison became friends on board with John Lodge of the Moody Blues when Davison began dating John's daughter Emily. Davison would later tour with John as an additional vocalist. He appears on Lodge's live album The Royal Affair And After.

During the COVID-19 pandemic lockdown, Davison provided backing vocals on Lodge's single, "In These Crazy Times". Lodge wrote and recorded the song in his home studio, and Jon appears alongside John's son, Kristian, and his wife, Kirsten. Emily managed the project. He also guests on Lodge's Days of Future Passed - My Sojourn (2023).

By 2022, Davison and Emily were engaged and would eventually get married.

After Lodge's death in 2025, Davison has organised a forthcoming series of tribute shows with himself playing bass and vocals along with Lodge's band, the 10,000 Light Years Band, and using Lodge's vocals on video.

=== Other ===
Davison and drummer Taylor Hawkins were friends from childhood. In 2015, Davison appeared at a Foo Fighters concert, playing with Hawkins, to perform the Rush song "Tom Sawyer" with them. In August 2019, Davison joined the Foo Fighters in concert in Dublin, Ireland to sing the Queen song "Under Pressure" with Taylor Hawkins while Dave Grohl took over on drums.

Davison has guested on two of Hawkins' projects, The Birds of Satan's (2015) eponymous album and Get the Money by Taylor Hawkins and the Coattail Riders (2019).

Davison performed at the Los Angeles tribute show to the late Hawkins in 2022.

In July 2020, Davison described a new side project with fellow Yes member Billy Sherwood and Yes touring drummer Jay Schellen called Arc of Life. Their self-titled debut album was released the following year on February 12, 2021. Featuring vocalist Jon Davison, bassist/vocalist Billy Sherwood, drummer Jay Schellen, keyboardist Dave Kerzner, and guitarist Jimmy Haun, their second album Don't Look Down was released on 18 November 2022.

Davison has worked more broadly with Kerzner, including singing in his In Continuum project.

== Discography ==
=== Arc of Life ===
- Arc of Life (2021) - lead vocals
- Don't Look Down (2022) - lead vocals

=== Glass Hammer ===
- If (2010) – lead and backing vocals
- Cor Cordium (2011) – lead and backing vocals, acoustic guitar
- The Stories of H.P. Lovecraft (2012, collaborative album of different artists) - lead and backing vocals on "Cool Air"
- Perilous (2012) – lead and backing vocals
- The Inconsolable Secret (2013 re-recording) – lead vocals
- Ode to Echo (2014) – lead and backing vocals
- Untold Tales (2017, compilation of previously unreleased/rare material) - lead and backing vocals on "Cool Air", backing vocals on "A Grain of Sand"

=== Sky Cries Mary ===
- This Timeless Turning (1993) – bass
- Moonbathing on Sleeping Leaves (1997) – bass
- Fresh Fruits for the Liberation (1998) – bass
- Seeds (1999) – bass
- Here and Now (2005) – bass
- Small Town (2007) – bass
- Space Between the Drops (2009) – bass
- Taking The Stage: 1997–2005 (2011) – bass, percussion, acoustic guitar, backing vocal

=== Yes ===
Studio albums

- Heaven & Earth (2014) – lead and backing vocals, acoustic guitar
- The Quest (2021) - lead and backing vocals, guitar
- Mirror to the Sky (2023) - lead and backing vocals, guitars
- Aurora (2026) - lead and backing vocals

Live albums

- Like It Is: Yes at the Bristol Hippodrome (2014) – lead vocals, acoustic guitar, percussion, keyboards
- Like It Is: Yes at the Mesa Arts Center (2015) – lead vocals, acoustic guitar, percussion, keyboards
- Topographic Drama - Live Across America (2017) - lead vocals, acoustic guitar, percussion, keyboards
- Yes 50 Live (2019) - lead vocals, acoustic guitar, percussion, keyboards
- The Royal Affair Tour: Live from Las Vegas (2020) - lead vocals, acoustic guitar, percussion

=== Guest appearances ===
- Tales from the Edge: A Tribute to the Music of Yes (2012) – lead vocals and tambourine on "Starship Trooper" with The Samurai of Prog
- Absinthe Tales of Romantic Visions by Mogador (2012) – lead vocals on "The Sick Rose"
- The Birds of Satan by The Birds of Satan (2015) - backing vocals on "Pieces of the Puzzle" and "Raspberries", co-wrote "Raspberries"
- Citizen by Billy Sherwood (2015) - lead vocals on "Written in the Centuries"
- Lost and Found by The Samurai of Prog (2016) - lead vocals on "She (Who Must be Obeyed)"
- Chaptersend by Mogador (2017) - backing vocals on "Josephine's Regrets"
- "Difference" (single) by Edison's Lab (2018) - backing vocals
- A Life in Yes—The Chris Squire Tribute by various artists (2018) - lead vocals on "On the Silent Wings of Freedom" and "Parallels"
- Yesterday and Today – A 50th Anniversary Tribute to Yes by Sonic Elements (2018) - lead vocals on "Acoustic Medley"
- Acceleration Theory Part One: AlienA by In Continuum (2019) - vocals on "Crash Landing", "Scavengers" and "Meant to Be"
- Planetary Overload Part 1: Loss by United Progressive Fraternity (2019) - backing vocals on two tracks
- Get the Money by Taylor Hawkins and the Coattail Riders (2019) - on "Crossed the Line"
- Acceleration Theory Part Two: Annihilation by In Continuum (2019) - vocals
- A Prog Rock Christmas by various artists (2019) - vocals on "Run with the Fox"
- A Tribute to Keith Emerson & Greg Lake by various artists (2020) - vocals on "C'est la Vie"
- Love Is by Steve Howe (2020) - backing vocals, bass
- On the Ending Earth... by Anyone (2020) - fretless bass on "Thought I Was"
- Cov3r to Cov3r (2020) by Neal Morse, Mike Portnoy and Randy George - lead vocals on 1 track
- "In These Crazy Times (The Isolation Mix)" (2020; digital single) by John Lodge - backing vocals
- In Humanity by Anyone (2021) - lead vocals on "Misanthropist"
- Animals Reimagined – A Tribute to Pink Floyd by various artists (2021) - vocals on "Pigs on a Wing 2"
- You Have It All by Lobate Scarp (2022) - vocals on "You Have It All"
- Songs We were Taught by Prog Collective (2022) - lead vocals on "The Sound of Silence"
- Seeking Peace by Prog Collective (2022) - vocals on "A Matter of Time"
- The Traveler by Dave Kerzner (2022) - vocals on "Feels Like Home"
- Days of Future Passed — My Sojourn (2023) by John Lodge - lead vocals on "Tuesday Afternoon" and "Nights in White Satin"
- The Wicked Forest by Leon Alvarado (2026) - vocals
