= Culture of Ascent =

Studio album by Glass Hammer
- Released: October 23rd, 2007
- Genres: Progressive rock, art rock
- Length: 69:05
- Label: Arion Records/Sound Resources
- Producers: Fred Schendel; Steve Babb

Glass Hammer chronology
The Inconsolable Secret (2005)	Culture of Ascent (2007)	Three Cheers for the Broken-Hearted (2009)

Culture of Ascent is the ninth studio album by American progressive rock band Glass Hammer, released on October 23, 2007. It is a concept album based on Jon Krakauer's novel Into Thin Air.

It was the last album with singer Carl Groves before his departure from the band; he later returned for 2014's Ode to Echo. The album also features Jon Anderson of Yes as a guest vocalist.

== Track listing ==
No.	Title	Writer(s)	Length
1.	"South Side of the Sky"	Jon Anderson, Chris Squire	9:25
2.	"Sun Song"	Steve Babb	9:36
3.	"Life by Light"	Babb	7:34
4.	"Ember without Name"	Carl Groves, Fred Schendel	16:38
5.	"Into Thin Air"	Babb, Schendel	19:19
6.	"Rest"	Groves, Schendel	6:36

== Personnel ==
Glass Hammer

- Carl Groves – lead and backing vocals
- Susie Bogdanowicz – lead and backing vocals
- Fred Schendel – keyboards, organs, piano, Mellotron, loops, programming, acoustic guitar, string arrangement, backing vocals
- Steve Babb – bass, pipe organ, percussion, Mellotron, piano, harp, loops, programming, Minimoog and backing vocals

Additional musicians

- Matt Mendians – drums
- David Walliman – electric guitars
- The Adonia String Trio – string trio
  - Rebecca James – violin
  - Susan Whitacre – viola
  - Rachel Beckmann – cello
- Sarah Snyder – backing vocals
- Eric Parker – acoustic guitar
- Robert Streets – backing vocals
- Haley McGuire – backing vocals
- Jon Anderson – vocalizations
- Fred Schendel and Steve Babb – production
- Bob Katz – mastering
- Michal Karcz – artwork, cover
