= Anyone (band) =

American band

Anyone is a band from Southern California led by Riz Story (Rodolpho Ivan Zahler). They released their 2001 self-titled album on Roadrunner Records.

== History ==
Story (then aged 26), drummer Taylor Hawkins (20), and Jon Davison (21) met in 1992 and formed a band that Story called Blash Meth. Davison left the band, moving to Seattle and joining Sky Cries Mary in 1993 and later Yes. Guitarist Sean Murphy joined at some stage, while the band changed its name to Sylvia. Hawkins joined Sass Jordan's touring band in 1994 and later the Foo Fighters, and Murphy began to work with bands Magdalen and Divinorum, and pursued a solo career. Story recruited Dave "Nipples" Murray on drums and Static on bass, and the band became Anyone in 1995.

In 1996, Anyone's first demo album Rats Live on no Evil Star (a palindrome) was recorded. Anyone was described by Roadrunner Records in 2001 as "the most innovative band of the new millennium!" They were offered the biggest record deal in the label's history up to that point. They released their full-length studio debut Anyone in 2001.

Johnny Ransom replaced Murray as drummer in 2002, and both Ransom and Static were replaced in 2004 by Mike Boano as drummer, Miki Black as guitarist and keyboardist, and Miles Martin on bass.

== Re-emergence ==
The sophomore album Echoes and Traces was released worldwide on September 1, 2014, along with a music video for the first single "Beautiful World". Five songs from the album are featured in the film and soundtrack for Riz Story's motion picture, A Winter Rose.

In 2018, it was announced via the band's official website that a full-length documentary about the band would be released in 2019. Plans were also announced for the release of a new album entitled On the Ending Earth.

In January 2021, the band released the single "My Death" as a tribute to David Bowie who previously recorded the song.

== Music ==
"Maximum Acid" is the term the press used to describe their sound, as a fusion of hard progressive rock and psychedelia. Their early sound was described as alternative rock and nu metal.

== Discography ==
Studio Albums

- Echoes of Man [2CD/Digital] (TogethermenT Records, 2025)
- Miracles In The Nothingness [2CD/Digital] (TogethermenT Records, 2023)
- In Humanity [2CD/Digital] (TogethermenT Records, 2021)
- On the Ending Earth... [CD/Digital] (TogethermenT Records, 2020)
- Echoes and Traces [CD/Digital] (TogethermenT Records, 2016)
- Anyone [CD] (Roadrunner Records, 2001)

Live Albums

- Live Acid - Deluxe Remastered Edition [Digital] (TogethermenT Records, 2020)
- Live Acid [CD] (1999)

Singles

- Only Imagine (TogethermenT Records, 2020) [non-album track from 2000]
- My Death (TogethermenT Records, 2021)
- Traces - The Dream Mix (TogethermenT Records, 2020)
- Chasing Dragons to the Sea (TogethermenT Records, 2020)
- Fly Away (TogethermenT Records, 2016)
- Beautiful World (TogethermenT Records, 2012)
- Don't Wake Me (Roadrunner Records, 2002)
- Whole World's Insane (Roadrunner Records, 2002)
- Real (Roadrunner Records, 2001)

EPs/Demos

- The Sylvia Sessions (TogethermenT Records, 2022) [Demo EP/NFT] [1993 recordings]
- Slow (Remaster) (2021) [demo track from 1996]
- A Little Sip... (2006) [EP]
- Maximum Acid (Roadrunner Records, 2001) [EP/Sampler]
- Mother Superior (2001) [demo track]
- Kissin God (2000) [demo track]
- Rats Live on no Evil Star (Longo Records, 1996) [demo album]

Film

- TogethermenT [Feature Film] (TogethermenT Films, 1999)
- The Story of Maximum Acid [DVD]
