= Ronald Augusto =

Brazilian writer (born 1961)

Ronald Augusto da Costa (Rio Grande, Rio Grande do Sul, August 4, 1961) is an experimental and visual poet, initially linked to the poesia marginal, poetry critic, editor, musician and songwriter of southern Brazil, with an associated editor to the website of the Sibyl, created by the poet Charles Bernstein and Régis Bonvicino, besides being renowned for his studies of world black literature.

Despite the possible uncomfortable reading of his poems, caused by continuous verbal Ronald Augusto experimentalism, the poet has achieved Brazilian national and global expression. Some critics, such as Régis Bonvicino, author of "The Poetry of the Improbable Americas", are considered Ronald one of the best Brazilian poets of later generations. His poems have been published in international literary journals such as Callaloo magazine: Brazilian African Literature: The U.S. special issue (1995), translated into English and into the German in the journal Zeitschrift für Dichtungsring Literature, among others. Translations of his poems into Spanish can also be found on the Internet.

== Awards ==
- Revelation Apesul Literary Award in 1979.
- Medal of Merit conferred by the State Commission for the Cruz e Sousa Centennial Celebration of Death, Santa Catarina state, for studies relating to the work of the black symbolist poet from Santa Catarina in 1998.
- Trophy awarded by Vasco Prado 9th National Day of Literature of Passo Fundo, in August 2001.

== Works ==
- Negro 3 X negro (nigger 3 X nigger), coauthored with Paulo Ricardo de Moraes, Jaime da Silva. Edited by authors. Porto Alegre, 1992.
- Homem ao Rubro (Man in Crimson). Edited by Grupo Pró-texto. Porto Alegre, 1983.
- Disco (Disc), coauthored with Hingo Weber. Edited by Contravez. Porto Alegre, 1986.
- Puya. Edited by author.Porto Alegre, 1987.
- Kânhamo. Edited by author. Porto Alegre, 1987,
- Puya (1987), Edited by Biblos. Porto Alegre, 1992.
- Vá de Valha. Collection Petit Poa. Edited by SMC. Porto Alegre, 1992.
- Confissões Aplicadas (Applied Confessions). Edited by Editora Ameop. Porto Alegre, 2004.
- No assoalho duro (On the floor hard). Edited by Editora Éblis. Porto Alegre, 2007.
- Cair de Costas (Falling backwards). Edited by Editora Éblis. Poesia reunida. Porto Alegre, 2012.
- Decupagens assim. Theoretical writings published in the Sibyl magazine and others magazines and newspapers. Editora Letras Contemporâneas. Florianópolis, 2012.
- À Ipásia que o espera. Poetry. Editora Ogum's Toques Negros. Salvador, 2016.
- Crítica Parcial. Theoretical essays. Editora Ogum's Toques Negros. Salvador, 2021.
