= Glass Hammer =

American progressive rock band

- Origin: Chattanooga, Tennessee, U.S.
- Genres: Progressive rock, symphonic rock
- Years active: 1992–present
- Labels: Arion, Audio Resources
- Members: Steve Babb
- Past members: Fred Schendel; Susie Bogdanowicz; Aaron Raulston; Hannah Pryor; Michelle Young; Walter Moore; Carl Groves; Jon Davison; Kamran Alan Shikoh
- Website: glasshammer.com

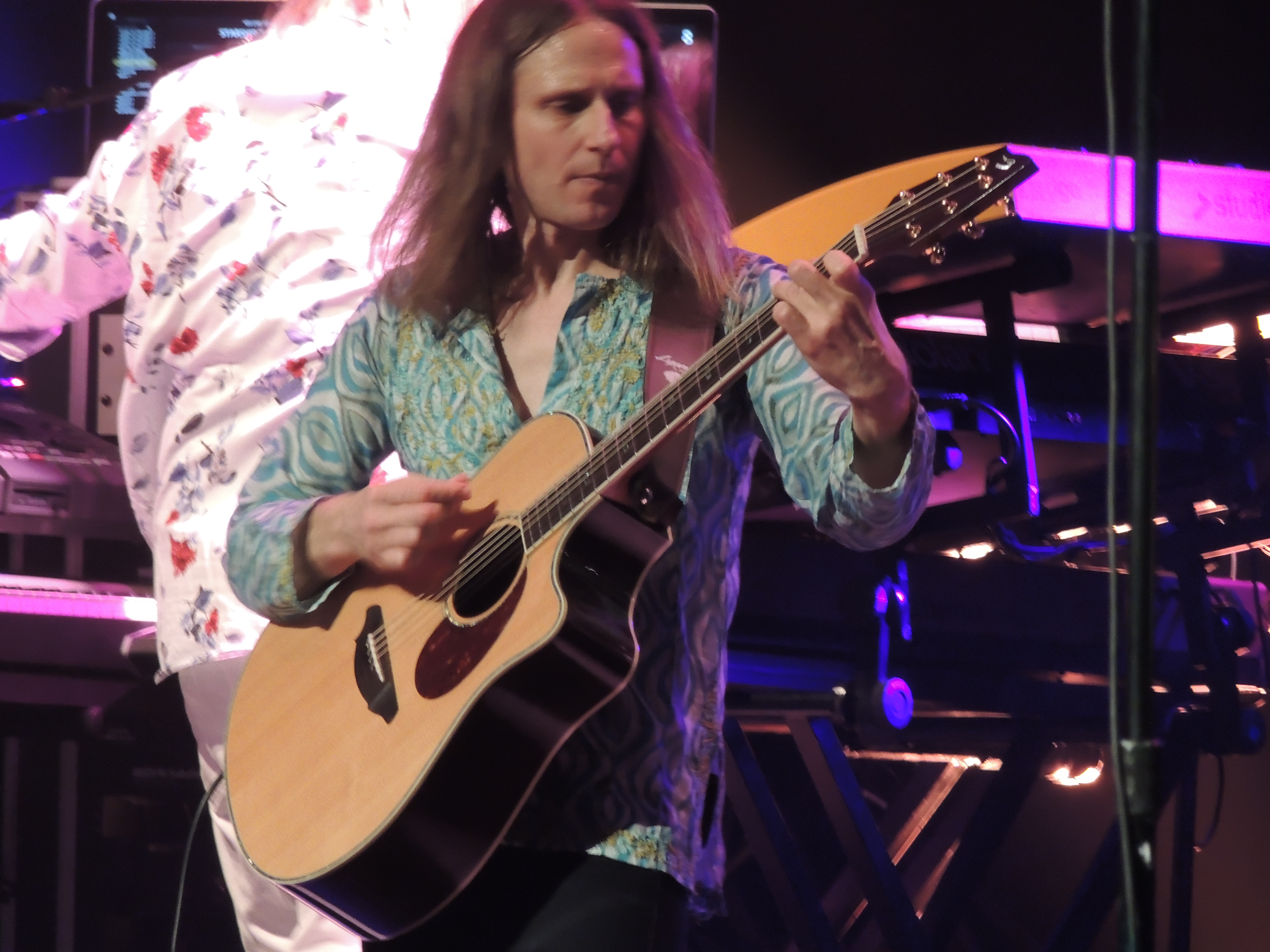
Jon Davison performing live with Yes at the Beacon Theatre 2013-04-09

Glass Hammer is an American progressive rock band from Chattanooga, Tennessee, led by Steve Babb and formerly Fred Schendel.

Babb and Schendel, who founded the band in 1992, were the only constant members in the lineup, having surrounded themselves by various guest performers. The different lineups included several lead vocalists, including Michelle Young and Jon Davison. Originally a studio project only, the band occasionally performs live, especially since the early 2010s, but never does large-scale tours.

== History ==
=== Origins and early years (1992–1997) ===
Schendel and Babb (then credited as "Stephen DeArqe") first met in 1986, and formed Glass Hammer in 1992 when they began to write and record Journey of the Dunadan, a concept album based on the story of Aragorn from J.R.R. Tolkien's The Lord of the Rings on which they performed most vocals and instruments. To their surprise, the album, released the following year, sold several thousand units via the Internet, TV home shopping, and phone orders, convincing them that Glass Hammer was a project worth continuing.

Embarking on a small tour in the south-east of the US, the band was joined by singer Michelle Young (who had been featured as a guest on a single track of Journey of the Dunadan), and drummer Walter Moore. With this line-up, they released their second album Perelandra in 1995, with Moore performing guitars instead of drums (which were handled by Schendel), and all four members performing lead vocals. It is another concept album, this time inspired by C. S. Lewis' The Chronicles of Narnia and Space Trilogy book series.

After a small tour to support the album, Young left the band in 1997 to pursue a solo career. The same year, the band released Live and Revived, a live/compilation album consisting of recorded live rehearsals from the previous tour and unreleased material written shortly after the release of Journey of the Dunadan. The album was originally limited to 1000 copies, but was later re-released. In parallel to Glass Hammer, Babb and Schendel created a techno/dance project, titled TMA-2, releasing two unsuccessful albums, Artifact One (1996) and Tick Tock Lilies (1998), before dropping the project.

=== Moore / Bogdanowicz years (1998–2009) ===
In 1998, Glass Hammer released their third studio album, On to Evermore, which saw Moore acting as main lead vocalist. It was followed two years later by Chronometree, another concept album following a young man who becomes convinced that aliens are trying to communicate with him through his albums. Guest Brad Marler provided lead vocals for the album.

Susie Bogdanowicz, who had provided backing vocals on Chronometree, joined the band as a full-time member, while Moore stopped acting as drummer, acting solely as singer on studio works, and also as guitarist in concerts; this would go on to become Glass Hammer's longest and steadiest line-up, which would be featured on the next four albums, the first being The Middle-Earth Album in 2001, their second album based on Lord of the Rings after Journey of the Dunadan. Jokingly marketed as a live album recorded during a performance at The Prancing Pony, an inn in Lord of the Rings, the album's first half emulated the sound of a band actually performing at the inn, while the second half was recorded like a traditional studio album. The Middle-Earth Album was followed by Lex Rex the following year.

The band's seventh studio album Shadowlands was released in 2004. The following year, The Inconsolable Secret would mark the last album with the line-up effective since The Middle-Earth Album, as Moore would leave his role as full-time member following the release of the album. In parallel to these studio albums, this line-up had also recorded and released the live album Live at Nearfest and the live DVD Lex Live, both recorded in 2003 and released in 2004.

After the departure of Moore, Glass Hammer recruited Carl Groves as their new male lead vocalists, recording and releasing the live DVD Live at Belmont in 2006. After a compilation album of rare/previously unreleased tracks titled The Compilations, the band released their first studio album with Groves, Culture of Ascent, in 2007. In 2009, the band took a completely different musical direction for their tenth studio album, Three Cheers for the Broken-Hearted, a pop rock album without Groves with focus on Bogdanowicz's vocals. The album was received negatively by fans due to departing from the band's usual progressive sound; although Schendel and Babb defended the quality of the album, they later admitted that they should not have released it under the Glass Hammer name.

=== Davison years (2009–2014) ===
Later in 2009, both Bogdanowicz and Groves left Glass Hammer, and Schendel and Babb recruited new singer Jon Davison and new guitarist Kamran Alan Shikoh. Together, this new line-up released three studio albums: If in 2010, Cor Cordium in 2011, and Perilous in 2012. The albums saw a return to progressive rock, with a shift towards a symphonic rock-oriented sound compared to previous albums. All three albums were very positively received, and resulted in a notable gain in popularity for the band.

In 2013, the band re-releasedThe Inconsolable Secret, with several tracks re-recorded with Davison and Shikoh and included in a third disc.

Meanwhile, Davison was selected by Yes as their new lead singer, which resulted in him having a reduced role in Glass Hammer.

In 2013, Bogdanowicz and Groves re-joined Glass Hammer, while Aaron Raulston joined as full-time drummer on January 17. With this seven-members line-up, the band released Ode to Echo in 2014, featuring all current and former full-time lead vocalists in the band's history, with current members Babb, Schendel, Bogdanowicz, Groves and Davison, and contributions by former vocalists Walter Moore and Michelle Young. After the release, Davison would quit working with the band due to his work with Yes, although he would only be officially removed from the line-up years later.

=== Recent years and live performances (2015–present) ===
With the line-up now consisting of Schendel, Babb, Bogdanowicz, Groves, Shikoh, and Raulston, the band released their fifteenth studio album The Breaking of the World in 2015.

In 2016, Carl Groves left the band once again, with the band choosing to focus on Bogdanowicz as vocalist. With this line-up, they released Valkyrie, a concept album following "a soldier’s struggle to return home from the horrors of war, to the girl who loves him and must ultimately find her way to him"; the album's vocals were focused on Bogdanowicz, although Schendel and Babb also performed secondary lead vocals for the first time in years. In a shift from their usual recording methods, the band rehearsed the album for several weeks, in order to record the album as if it were an actual live performance.

In 2017, the band released Untold Tales, a compilation album of unreleased or hard to find Glass Hammer recordings originating from the early 90s to 2017, and as such featured both current and former members of Glass Hammer. On the 2018 Cruise to the Edge festival, on which he was also performing with Yes, Davison performed with Glass Hammer as a guest, marking the first time he performed live with the band. On April 18, 2018, Glass Hammer announced their upcoming live album Mostly Live, which does not feature Kamran Alan Shikoh; they also removed Shikoh from the band's lineup on their official Facebook, stating in a post "And then there were four."

On August 13, 2018, after several weeks of teasing via videos featuring the character of Tom from their fourth album Chronometree released in 2000, the band announced their seventeenth studio album, Chronomonaut for an October 12, 2018 release. A a sequel to Chronometree, the album follows Tom "in the modern day though his mid-life crisis", as "the voices have returned and have been urging Tom to time-travel back to the glory days of the early prog scene." The release coincided with a remastered re-release of Chronometree with a bonus track.

On December 8, 2019, the band published two videos about their next album, Dreaming City, stating that "all the basic tracks are down. All the songs have their shapes and their arrangements." They stated that their inspirations included 1970s' Rush, Hawkwind, and Michael Moorcock's Elric of Melniboné novels (the first novel in the series being 1961's The Dreaming City); it would be a concept album themed around sword and sorcery, but in a "more Tongue-in-cheek [way than] people manage to understand sometimes." The album would be set in the same universe as The Inconsolable Secret.

The band has subsequently become more led by Babb, with Schendel not appearing on 2026's Black Light.

== Music ==
While many musicians have appeared on Glass Hammer albums over the years, Babb and Schendel have remained the core of the band. Both men play a variety of instruments, but Babb mainly concentrates on bass guitar and keyboards while Schendel also plays keyboards as well as various guitars and drums (until the addition of live drummer Matt Mendians to the studio recording band in 2004). They also sing, although a number of other vocalists (most notably Michelle Young, Walter Moore, Susie Bogdanowicz, Carl Groves, and Jon Davison) have also handled lead vocal duties.

Lyrically, Glass Hammer is inspired mostly by their love of fantasy literature (most notably Tolkien and C. S. Lewis) and by their Christian faith. Although by their own admission they have tried to avoid becoming an overtly Christian band, their 2002 release Lex Rex was a concept album based on a Roman soldier's encounter with Jesus.

Musically, their most apparent influences are Yes, Kansas, Emerson, Lake & Palmer, and to a less noticeable extent, Genesis. While Glass Hammer has, for the most part, combined those influences into a characteristic style of their own, they made much more direct references to the aforementioned bands on their 2000 album Chronometree, which told the story of a drug-addled progressive rock fan who becomes convinced aliens are speaking to him through the music he listens to.

== Personnel ==
=== Members ===
Current members

- Fred Schendel – keyboards, guitar, lead and backing vocals (1992–present), drums (1992–2004)
- Steve Babb – bass, keyboards, lead and backing vocals (1992–present), percussion (1992–2004)
- Aaron Raulston – drums (2013–present)
- Hannah Pryor – lead vocals (2021–present)

Former members

- Michelle Young – lead vocals (1993–1997; guest 1992, 2013), keyboards (1993–1995)
- Walter Moore – drums (1993–2000), lead vocals, guitar (1995–2005; guest vocalist 2005–2014)
- Susie Bogdanowicz – lead vocals (1999–2009, 2013–2021)
- Carl Groves – lead vocals (2006–2009, 2013–2016)
- Jon Davison – lead vocals (2009–2014; guest 2018)
- Kamran Alan Shikoh – guitars, electric sitar (2009–2018)

Former session/guest musicians

- David Carter – guitars (1992–2005)
- Brad Marler – lead vocals (2000)
- Terry Clouse – guitars (2000)
- Sarah Snyder – vocals (2001)
- Bethany Warren (Susie Bogdanowicz's younger sister) – vocals (2004–2014)
- Flo Paris – vocals (2004–2014)
- Matt Mendians – drums (2004–2014)
- The Adonia String Trio – strings (2005–2014)
  - Rebecca James – violin
  - Susan Whitacre – viola
  - Rachel Beckmann/Hackenberger – cello
- David Wallimann – guitars (2007–2014)
- Randall Williams – drums (2009–2013)

== Discography ==
Studio albums

- Journey of the Dunadan (1993)
- Perelandra (1995)
- On to Evermore (1998)
- Chronometree (2000)
- The Middle-Earth Album (2001)
- Lex Rex (2002)
- Shadowlands (2004)
- The Inconsolable Secret (2005, re-recorded in 2013)
- Culture of Ascent (2007)
- Three Cheers for the Broken-Hearted (2009)
- If (2010)
- Cor Cordium (2011)
- Perilous (2012)
- Ode to Echo (2014)
- The Breaking of the World (2015)
- Valkyrie (2016)
- Chronomonaut (2018)
- Dreaming City (2020)
- Skallagrim - Into the Breach (2021)
- At the Gate (2022)
- ARISE (2023)
- Rogue (2025)
- Black Light (2026)

Live albums

- Live and Revived (1997; also a compilation of previously unreleased tracks)
- Live at Nearfest (2004)
- Double Live (2015)
- Mostly Live (2018)

Live DVDs

- Lex Live (2004)
- Live at Belmont (2006)
- Live at the Tivoli (2008)
- Double Live (2015)

Compilations

- The Compilations (2006) – compilation of rare/previously unreleased material from 1996-2004
- Untold Tales (2017) – compilation of rare/previously unreleased matecrial from 1993-2017
- A Matter of Time – Volume 1 (2020) – reworked tracks from previous albums

Collaborations

- Love Changes (1995) – collaborative album by Tracy Cloud featuring Glass Hammer
- Harbour of Joy (1996) – collaborative Camel tribute album by various artists; provided the song "Air Born"
- The Stories of H.P. Lovecraft (2012) – collaborative album by various artists; provided the song "Cool Air"

Related and pre-Glass Hammer

- Artifact One (1996) – album by TMA-2, a techno/dance project by Babb and Schendel
- Tick Tock Lilies (1998) – second and last TMA-2 album
- David & Goliath - the Musical (2002) – Babb and Schendel
- One (2010) – old recordings by Babb and Schendel from 1991-1992
- Do Not See Me Rabbit (2011) – Schendel solo album, released under the name Trurl
