= On to Evermore =

Studio album by Glass Hammer
- Released: February 18, 1998
- Genre: Art rock, progressive rock
- Length: 1:02:53
- Label: Arion Records/Sound Resources
- Producer: Steve Babb; Fred Schendel

Glass Hammer chronology
Perelandra (1995)	On to Evermore (1998)	Chronometree (2000)

On to Evermore is the third studio album by American progressive rock band Glass Hammer, released on February 18, 1998.

== Track listing ==
No.	Title	Length
1.	"On to Evermore"	7:01
2.	"The Mayor of Longview"	5:27
3.	"The Conflict"	5:46
4.	"Muse"	1:06
5.	"Arianna"	16:46
6.	"Only Red"	5:19
7.	"This Fading Age"	5:15
8.	"Junkyard Angel"	9:09
9.	"Twilight on Longview"	5:42
10.	"Wind" (hidden track)	1:02

== Personnel ==
Glass Hammer

- Fred Schendel – lead and backing vocals, keyboards, guitars, sitar, mandolin, flute, drums
- Steve Babb – lead and backing vocals, keyboards, bass, percussion
- Walter Moore – lead and backing vocals, guitars, drums

Additional musicians

- David Carter – guitars, backing vocals
- Tracy Cloud – backing vocals
