= Chronometree =

Studio album by Glass Hammer
- Released: May 1, 2000
- Genre: Progressive rock, art rock
- Length: 48:00
- Label: Arion Records/Sound Resources
- Producer: Steve Babb, Fred Schendel

Glass Hammer chronology
On to Evermore (1998)	Chronometree (2000)	The Middle-Earth Album (2001)

Chronometree is the fourth studio album by American progressive rock band Glass Hammer, released on May 1, 2000.

It is the first album to feature Susie Bogdanowicz (then named Susie Warren), who is featured as guest backing vocalist in the album and would later join the band as lead singer for subsequent releases. Session member Brad Marler provided all lead vocals for the album.

It is a tongue-in-cheek concept album concerning a young man called Tom, who becomes convinced that aliens are trying to communicate with him through his albums. It is a celebration of the excesses of seventies progressive rock, and uses many of the traditional keyboard sounds of the era in order to strengthen this connection. The band's 2018 seventeenth studio album, Chronomonaut, is a follow-up to Chronometree.

== Track listing ==
All tracks are written by Fred Schendel and Steve Babb except when noted.

No.	Title	Length
1.	"Empty Space – Revealer"	6:45
2.	"An Eldritch Wind"	3:26
3.	"Revelation/Chronometry"	8:07
4.	"Chronotheme"	4:41
5.	"A Perfect Carousel" (Brad Marler)	5:17
6.	"Chronos Deliverer"	5:49
7.	"Shapes of the Morning"	1:55
8.	"Chronoverture"	5:59
9.	"The Waiting"	5:43
10.	"Watching the Sky"	0:59

== Personnel ==
Glass Hammer

- Fred Schendel – Hammond organ, Mellotron, Minimoog, synthesizers, acoustic and electric guitars, slide guitar, Autoharp, recorders, drums, backing vocals
- Steve Babb – bass, keyboards, Mellotron, assorted analog synthesizers, backing vocals
- Walter Moore – electric and acoustic guitars, drums on "Chronos Deliverer"

Additional musicians

- Brad Marler – lead and backing vocals, acoustic guitar
- Arjen Lucassen – additional lead guitar on "All In Good Time"
- Terry Clouse – additional lead guitar
- Susie Warren – backing vocals on "Chronos Deliverer"
- Jamie Watkins – backing vocals on "Chronos Deliverer"
- Sarah Snyder – backing vocals on "Chronos Deliverer"

Production

- Fred Schendel, Steve Babb – production
- Bruce Huffman – cover art
