= Ode to Echo =

Studio album by Glass Hammer
- Released: March 11, 2014
- Recorded: 2013, Sound Resources, Chattanooga, Tennessee
- Genre: Progressive rock, symphonic rock
- Length: 53:21
- Label: Arion Records/Audio Resources
- Producer: Fred Schendel and Steve Babb

Glass Hammer chronology
Perilous (2012)	Ode to Echo (2014)	The Breaking of the World (2015)

Ode to Echo is the fourteenth studio album by American progressive rock band Glass Hammer, released on March 11, 2014.

It is the first album with drummer Aaron Raulston, and marks the return of former vocalists Carl Groves and Susie Bogdanowicz. Groves wasn't featured in a Glass Hammer album since Culture of Ascent in 2007, and Bogdanowicz's last album with the band was Three Cheers for the Broken-Hearted in 2009; in the three previous albums, all lead vocals were sung by new singer Jon Davison.

Ode to Echo is also notable for featuring all the full-time vocalists in Glass Hammer history with Groves, Davison, Bogdanowicz, session member (and former full-time vocalist) Walter Moore sharing lead vocals, while band leaders Steve Babb and Fred Schendel (who sang lead vocals in some of the band's works) and original Glass Hammer singer Michelle Young provided backing vocals.

== Track listing ==
No.	Title	Lyrics	Music	Length
1.	"Garden of Hedon"	Carl Groves	Alan Shikoh, Fred Schendel, Steve Babb, Groves	6:57
2.	"Misantrog"	Groves	Schendel, Groves	10:00
3.	"Crowbone"	Robert Low	Schendel	7:22
4.	"I Am I"	Babb	Babb, Schendel	8:15
5.	"The Grey Hills"	Babb	Babb, Groves	4:47
6.	"Porpoise Song"	Gerry Goffin	Carole King	3:37
7.	"Panegyric"	Schendel	Schendel	4:11
8.	"Ozymandias"	Groves	Babb, Groves	8:12

== Personnel ==
Glass Hammer

- Carl Groves – lead vocals
- Jon Davison – lead and backing vocals
- Susie Bogdanowicz – lead and backing vocals
- Alan Shikoh – electric acoustic and classical guitars, electric sitar
- Steve Babb – bass, keyboards, backing vocals
- Fred Schendel – keyboards, guitars, backing vocals
- Aaron Raulston – drums

Production

- Fred Schendel and Steve Babb – Record producer
- Bob Katz – mastering
- Michał Xaay Loranc – cover, artwork, logo design
- Julie Babb – administration, band photography
- Bret Noblitt – precision audio

Additional musicians

- Walter Moore – vocals
- Michelle Young – backing vocals
- Randy Jackson – guitar and backing vocals on "Crowbone"
- David Ragsdale – violin on "Crowbone"
- Rob Reed – piano and first Minimoog solo on "Misantrog"
