= Journey of the Dunadan =

Studio album by Glass Hammer
- Released: August 3, 1993
- Genre: Progressive rock
- Length: 70:13
- Label: Arion Records/Sound Resources
- Producer: Fred Schendel, Stephen DeArqe

Glass Hammer chronology
Journey of the Dunadan (1993)	Perelandra (1995)

Journey of the Dunadan is the debut studio album by American progressive rock band Glass Hammer, released on August 3, 1993. It is a concept album based on the story of Aragorn from J.R.R. Tolkien's novel The Lord of the Rings.

Steve Babb is credited under the name Stephen DeArqe on the album. Singer Michelle Young is featured on the album, but would only become a band member for their next release, Perelandra.

== Track listing ==
All tracks are written by Fred Schendel and Stephen DeArqe.

No.	Title	Length
1.	"Shadows of the Past"	3:19
2.	"Something's Coming"	3:18
3.	"Song of the Dunadan"	9:14
4.	"Fog on the Barrow-Downs"	2:34
5.	"The Prancing Pony"	1:13
6.	"The Way to Her Heart"	3:32
7.	"The Ballad of Balin Longbeard"	3:40
8.	"Rivendell"	3:31
9.	"Khazad-Dum"	1:24
10.	"Nimrodel"	4:58
11.	"The Palantir"	6:39
12.	"Pelennor Fields"	4:26
13.	"Why I Cry (Arwen's Song)"	5:20
14.	"Anduril"	2:03
15.	"Morannon Gate"	5:41
16.	"The Return of the King"	7:55
17.	"Why I Cry (Single Edit)"	3:59
Total length:		72:47

== Personnel ==
Glass Hammer

- Fred Schendel – lead and backing vocals, organ, keyboards, acoustic guitar, recorder, drums
- Stephen DeArqe – lead and backing vocals, synthesizer, bass guitar, trurus pedal, medieval guitar, percussion

Additional musicians

- Piper Kirk – lead and backing vocals
- Michelle Young – lead and backing vocals
- Basil Clouse – bass on "The Palantir" & "Return of the King"
- David Carter – electric guitar on "Morannon Gate"
- Rod Lambert – electric violin on "The Palantir"
- Tony Mac – rhythm programming on "Return of the King"

Production

- Fred Schendel, Stephen DeArqe – production
- Rosana Azar – cover art
