= Bob Katz =

American audio engineer

Bob Katz is an American audio mastering engineer and author of a popular book on audio mastering. Katz has mastered three Grammy Award–winning albums and one nominated album. Projects he has worked on have received Grammys and acclaim from audiophiles, and his book on mastering is considered by some to be the "definitive work on mastering".

== Career ==
Katz taught at the Institute of Audio Research from 1978 to 1980. In 1988, Katz joined Chesky Records and began recording jazz and classical artists there, as well as producing oversampled commercial recordings. In 1990, he founded an audio-mastering company called Digital Domain Mastering, where he continues to work. In early 2015, Katz began a regular blog, Katz's Corner, on the headphone enthusiast site InnerFidelity.

== Grammy Award–winning albums ==
Grammy Award–winning albums mastered by Bob Katz:

- 1985: Ben Kingsley, The Words of Gandhi
- 1997: Paquito D'Rivera, Portraits of Cuba
- 2001: Olga Tañón, Olga Viva, Viva Olga

== K-system, K-stereo and K-surround ==
Bob Katz proposed the K-system to measure audio levels and standardize dynamic range in recorded audio. He has developed the proprietary systems K-stereo and K-surround. These processes are designed to "recover lost or amplify hidden ambience, space and imaging, and generate stereo from mono signals without adding artificial reverberation".
