= Timeline of progressive rock (2020–2029) =

This is a timeline of artists, albums, and events in progressive rock and its subgenres. This article contains the timeline for the period 2020–.

== 2020 ==
=== Newly formed bands ===
- The Smile

=== Reformed bands ===
- Genesis
- Vektor
- Liquid Tension Experiment

=== Bands on hiatus ===
- Anathema

=== Albums ===
Release Date	Artist	Album	Country
3 January 2020	Karfagen	Birds of Passage	Ukraine
13 January 2020	MOON HALO	Chroma	UK
17 January 2020	Different Light	Binary Suns (Part 1 - Operant Condition)	Czech Republic
17 January 2020	Sons of Apollo	MMXX	USA
24 January 2020	Nektar	The Other Side	UK
24 January 2020	Thy Catafalque	Naiv	Hungary
31 January 2020	Hällas	Conundrum	Sweden
8 February 2020	Pendragon	Love Over Fear	UK
14 February 2020	Ihsahn	Telemark (EP)	Norway
14 February 2020	Lazuli	Le Fantastique Envol de Dieter Böhm	France
14 February 2020	Psychotic Waltz	The God-Shaped Void	USA
21 February 2020	Pat Metheny	From This Place	USA
27 February 2020	My Arrival	Satur9 & Indigo	Netherlands
28 February 2020	Intronaut	Fluid Existential Inversions	USA
28 February 2020	SLIFT	Ummon	France
10 March 2020	Anubis	Homeless	Australia
13 March 2020	Horse Lords	The Common Task	USA
20 March 2020	JPL	Sapiens, Chapter 1/3: Exordium	France
3 April 2020	Pure Reason Revolution	Eupnea	UK
10 April 2020	Zopp	Zopp	UK
17 April 2020	Glass Hammer	Dreaming City	USA
24 April 2020	Elder	Omens	USA
24 April 2020	Katatonia	City Burials	Sweden
24 April 2020	King Gizzard & the Lizard Wizard	Chunky Shrapnel	Australia
8 May 2020	Green Carnation	Leaves of Yesteryear	Norway
8 May 2020	Mekong Delta	Tales of a Future Past	Germany
15 May 2020	Pattern-Seeking Animals	Prehensile Tales	USA
22 May 2020	Caligula's Horse	Rise Radiant	Australia
5 June 2020	Frost*	Others EP	UK
12 June 2020	Rick Wakeman	The Red Planet	UK
19 June 2020	Airbag	A Day at the Beach	Norway
19 June 2020	Protest the Hero	Palimpsest	Canada
10 July 2020	Voivod	The End of Dormancy (EP)	Canada
17 July 2020	Kansas	The Absence of Presence	USA
17 July 2020	Lonely Robot	Feelings Are Good	UK
20 July 2020	Abel Ganz	The Life Of The Honey Bee and Other Moments Of Clarity	Scotland
24 July 2020	Haken	Virus	UK
31 July 2020	Steve Howe	Love Is	UK
1 August 2020	AraPacis	Déja Hard	Canada
7 August 2020	Deep Purple	Whoosh!	UK
7 August 2020	Good Tiger	Raised in a Doomsday Cult	USA
14 August 2020	Kamelot	I Am the Empire – Live from the 013	USA
21 August 2020	The Tangent	Auto Reconnaissance	International
28 August 2020	John Petrucci	Terminal Velocity	USA
28 August 2020	Motorpsycho	The All Is One	Norway
28 August 2020	Pain of Salvation	PANTHER	Sweden
28 August 2020	Tim Bowness	Late Night Laments	UK
4 September 2020	Oceans of Slumber	Oceans of Slumber	USA
4 September 2020	The Pineapple Thief	Versions of the Truth	UK
11 September 2020	Ihsahn	Pharos (EP)	Norway
11 September 2020	Mastodon	Medium Rarities	USA
11 September 2020	Neal Morse	Sola Gratia	USA
18 September 2020	Derek Sherinian	The Phoenix	USA
18 September 2020	Gazpacho	Fireworker	Norway
25 September 2020	Ayreon	Transitus	Netherlands
25 September 2020	Fish	Weltschmerz	UK
25 September 2020	The Ocean	Phanerozoic II: Mesozoic / Cenozoic	Germany
2 October 2020	Enslaved	Utgard	Norway
9 October 2020	Ozric Tentacles	Space for the Earth	UK
23 October 2020	Wobbler	Dwellers of the Deep	Norway
30 October 2020	The Flower Kings	Islands	Sweden
6 November 2020	Blackfield	For the Music	International
6 November 2020	Fates Warning	Long Day Good Night	USA
13 November 2020	Intervals	Circadian	Canada
13 November 2020	Lunatic Soul	Through Shaded Woods	Poland
20 November 2020	King Gizzard & the Lizard Wizard	K.G.	Australia
20 November 2020	King Gizzard & the Lizard Wizard	Live in San Francisco '16	Australia
27 November 2020	Plini	Impulse Voices	Australia
11 December 2020	Karfagen	Principles and Theory of Spektra	Ukraine
20 December 2020	Asia Minor	Points of Libration	France

=== Events ===
- Drummer and lyricist Neil Peart of Rush died on January 7 at the age of 67 after fighting brain cancer for over three years.
- Sean Reinert, drummer for Cynic and Gordian Knot, died on January 24 at 48.
- Coheed and Cambria planned their inaugural S.S. Neverender cruise for October 26–30 with other prog bands such as The Dear Hunter, Polyphia, and Thank You Scientist; the event was postponed to 2021 due to the COVID-19 pandemic.
- The COVID-19 pandemic significantly impacts the music industry, particularly disrupting concerts and tours. Tool, Roger Waters, King Crimson, and Coheed and Cambria postpone part or all of their 2020 tours, and Steven Wilson postpones the release of his sixth solo studio album until early 2021.
- Florian Schneider, co-founder of Kraftwerk, died of cancer on April 21 at 73.
- Cardiacs frontman Tim Smith died on July 22 at 59.
- In August 2020, Eric Moore, the second drummer and manager of King Gizzard & the Lizard Wizard, announced that he would be leaving the band to focus on running Flightless Records.

== 2021 ==
=== Reformed bands ===
- Porcupine Tree

=== Albums ===
Release Date	Artist	Album	Country
22 January 2021	Steve Hackett	Under a Mediterranean Sky	UK
29 January 2021	Needlepoint	Walking Up That Valley	Norway
29 January 2021	Soen	Imperial	Sweden
29 January 2021	Steven Wilson	The Future Bites	UK
5 February 2021	Transatlantic	The Absolute Universe	International
12 February 2021	3.2	Third Impression	UK
12 February 2021	Elephant9	Arrival of the New Elders	Norway
26 February 2021	Epica	Omega	Netherlands
26 February 2021	Evergrey	Escape of The Phoenix	Sweden
26 February 2021	King Gizzard & the Lizard Wizard	L.W.	Australia
26 February 2021	Strawbs	Settlement	UK
12 March 2021	JPL	Sapiens, Chapter 2/3: Deus ex Machina	France
15 March 2021	AraPacis	Waterdog	Canada
16 March 2021	Lazuli	Dénudé	France
21 March 2021	Trettioåriga Kriget	Till horisonten	Sweden
26 March 2021	Cosmograf	Rattrapante	England
28 March 2021	Emily Steinwall	Welcome to the Garden	Canada
16 April 2021	Liquid Tension Experiment	Liquid Tension Experiment 3	USA
16 April 2021	Motorpsycho	Kingdom of Oblivion	Norway
30 April 2021	Gojira	Fortitude	France
7 May 2021	Jordsjø	Pastoralia	Norway
7 May 2021	Kayak	Out of This World	Netherlands
14 May 2021	Frost*	Day and Age	UK
28 May 2021	Black Midi	Cavalcade	UK
28 May 2021	Sylvan	One to Zero	Germany
11 June 2021	King Gizzard & the Lizard Wizard	Butterfly 3000	Australia
18 June 2021	Styx	Crash of the Crown	USA
25 June 2021	Scale the Summit	Subjects	USA
25 June 2021	Thy Catafalque	Vadak	Hungary
30 July 2021	Big Big Train	Common Ground	UK
30 July 2021	Steve Howe	Homebrew 7	UK
20 August 2021	Between the Buried and Me	Colors II	USA
25 August 2021	betcover!!	時間 (Jikan)	Japan
27 August 2021	Leprous	Aphelion	Norway
27 August 2021	NMB (The Neal Morse Band)	Innocence & Danger	USA
10 September 2021	Agusa	En annan värld	Sweden
10 September 2021	Hawkwind	Somnia	UK
10 September 2021	Steve Hackett	Surrender of Silence	UK
10 September 2021	Tony Kaye	End of Innocence	UK
24 September 2021	Mostly Autumn	Graveyard Star	UK
24 September 2021	The Watch	The Art of Bleeding	Italy
1 October 2021	King of Sweden	The Training	Finland
1 October 2021	Rachel Flowers	Bigger on the Inside	USA
1 October 2021	Yes	The Quest	UK
8 October 2021	Caravan	It's None of Your Business	UK
15 October 2021	Glass Hammer	Skallagrim - Into the Breach	USA
22 October 2021	Circa Survive	A Dream About Love	USA
22 October 2021	The Dear Hunter	The Indigo Child	USA
22 October 2021	Dream Theater	A View from the Top of the World	USA
22 October 2021	Premiata Forneria Marconi	Ho sognato pecore elettriche	Italy
29 October 2021	Kayo Dot	Moss Grew on the Swords and Plowshares Alike	USA
29 October 2021	Mastodon	Hushed and Grim	USA
2 November 2021	Diablo Swing Orchestra	Swagger & Stroll Down the Rabbit Hole	Sweden
19 November 2021	Thank You Scientist	Plague Accommodations EP	USA
23 November 2021	Dave Bainbridge	To the Far Away	UK
26 November 2021	Cynic	Ascension Codes	USA
26 November 2021	Richard Dawson & Circle	Henki	UK/Finland
3 December 2021	Devin Townsend	The Puzzle	Canada
3 December 2021	Devin Townsend	Snuggles	Canada
3 December 2021	Elder & Kadavar	Eldovar: A Story of Darkness & Light	USA/Germany
3 December 2021	The Physics House Band	Incident on 3rd	UK

=== Disbandments ===
- King Crimson

=== Events ===
- Chick Corea, American jazz fusion keyboardist and founder of fusion band Return to Forever, died of cancer on February 9 at the age of 79.
- Coheed and Cambria's S.S. Neverender cruise, featuring other prog bands such as The Dear Hunter, Polyphia, and Thank You Scientist, set sail from October 25 through 29, after being postponed from the previous year due to the COVID-19 pandemic.
- David Longdon, the lead singer, multi-instrumentalist, and frontman of Big Big Train, died on November 20 in a tragic accident at the age of 56.

== 2022 ==
=== Reformed bands ===
- The Mars Volta
- Zero Hour

=== Albums ===
Release Date	Artist	Album	Country
7 January 2022	Karfagen	Land of Green and Gold	Ukraine
28 January 2022	Big Big Train	Welcome to the Planet	UK
28 January 2022	Jethro Tull	The Zealot Gene	UK
28 January 2022	Steve Vai	Inviolate	USA
4 February 2022	Circa Survive	A Dream About Death	USA
11 February 2022	Amorphis	Halo	Finland
11 February 2022	Cult of Luna	The Long Road North	Sweden
11 February 2022	Voivod	Synchro Anarchy	Canada
18 February 2022	Star One	Revel in Time	Netherlands
25 February 2022	D'Virgilio, Morse & Jennings	Troika	USA/UK
25 February 2022	Tangerine Dream	Raum	Germany
4 March 2022	The Flower Kings	By Royal Decree	Sweden
4 March 2022	Marillion	An Hour Before It's Dark	UK
5 March 2022	King Gizzard & the Lizard Wizard	Made in Timeland	Australia
18 March 2022	Midlake	For the Sake of Bethel Woods	USA
18 March 2022	Von Hertzen Brothers	Red Alert in the Blue Forest	Finland
25 March 2022	Animals as Leaders	Parrhesia	USA
25 March 2022	JPL	Sapiens, Chapter 3/3: Actum	France
25 March 2022	Michael Romeo	War of the Worlds, Pt. 2	USA
1 April 2022	Pattern-Seeking Animals	Only Passing Through	USA
1 April 2022	Meshuggah	Immutable	Sweden
8 April 2022	Daniel Rossen	You Belong There	USA
8 April 2022	Hällas	Isle of Wisdom	Sweden
8 April 2022	Joe Satriani	The Elephants of Mars	USA
22 April 2022	King Gizzard & the Lizard Wizard	Omnium Gatherum	Australia
22 April 2022	Primus	Conspiranoid	USA
29 April 2022	Kaipa	Urskog	Sweden
6 May 2022	Pure Reason Revolution	Above Cirrus	UK
13 May 2022	Gospel	The Loser	USA
13 May 2022	The Smile	A Light for Attracting Attention	UK
20 May 2022	Evergrey	A Heartless Portrait (The Orphean Testament)	Sweden
10 June 2022	Seventh Wonder	The Testament	Sweden
10 June 2022	The Tangent	Songs From the Hard Shoulder	International
15 June 2022	Dir En Grey	Phalaris	Japan
24 June 2022	Coheed and Cambria	Vaxis – Act II: A Window of the Waking Mind	USA
24 June 2022	Porcupine Tree	Closure/Continuation	UK
1 July 2022	The Dear Hunter	Antimai	USA
2 July 2022	Extra Life	Secular Works, Vol. 2	USA
15 July 2022	Alan Parsons	From the New World	UK
15 July 2022	Black Midi	Hellfire	UK
22 July 2022	Imperial Triumphant	Spirit of Ecstasy	USA
22 July 2022	Oceans of Slumber	Starlight and Ash	USA
29 July 2022	The Gathering	Beautiful Distortion	Netherlands
19 August 2022	Motorpsycho	Ancient Astronauts	Norway
26 August 2022	Muse	Will of the People	UK
26 August 2022	Sigh	Shiki	Japan
2 September 2022	Blind Guardian	The God Machine	Germany
2 September 2022	King's X	Three Sides of One	USA
9 September 2022	Cosmograf	Heroic Materials	England
16 September 2022	The Mars Volta	The Mars Volta	USA
23 September 2022	Banco del Mutuo Soccorso	Orlando: Le Forme dell'Amore	Italy
7 October 2022	King Gizzard & the Lizard Wizard	Ice, Death, Planets, Lungs, Mushrooms and Lava	Australia
7 October 2022	Queensrÿche	Digital Noise Alliance	USA.
12 October 2022	King Gizzard & the Lizard Wizard	Laminated Denim	Australia
21 October 2022	Arena	The Theory Of Molecular Inheritance	UK
24 October 2022	Galahad	The Last Great Adventurer	UK
28 October 2022	Devin Townsend	Lightwork	Canada
28 October 2022	King Gizzard & the Lizard Wizard	Changes	Australia
1 November 2022	AraPacis	Suburban Mist	Canada
18 November 2022	Richard Dawson	The Ruby Cord	UK
18 November 2022	Threshold	Dividing Lines	UK
25 November 2022	Elder	Innate Passage	USA
2 December 2022	Collage	Over and Out	Poland
21 December 2022	betcover!!	卵 (Tamago)	Japan

=== Disbandments ===
- The Birds of Satan
- Procol Harum

=== Events ===
- King Crimson's founding saxophonist and keyboard player Ian McDonald died on February 9 at 75, a week after the release of the trailer for a King Crimson documentary, in which McDonald apologized to Robert Fripp for leaving the band back in 1969.
- Gary Brooker, the founder, lead singer, principal songwriter, and sole continuous member of Procol Harum, died at the age of 76 on February 19.
- Taylor Hawkins (The Birds of Satan, Coheed and Cambria) was found dead at 50 in a hotel room in Bogotá, Colombia on March 26. An initial toxicology report showed the presence of 10 substances in his body; however, no official cause of death was disclosed.
- Klaus Schulze, Prominent electronic music pioneer and drummer for Krautrock bands Ash Ra Tempel, The Cosmic Jokers, and Tangerine Dream, died on April 26 at the age of 74.
- Progressive electronic composer and Aphrodite's Child keyboardist Vangelis died on May 17 at 79 due to COVID-19 complications.
- Yes drummer Alan White died at the age of 72 on May 26.
- Massimo Morante of Goblin died on June 23 at 69.

== 2023 ==
=== Reformed bands ===
- Beardfish

=== Albums ===
Release Date	Artist	Album	Country
9 January 2023	Sunchild	Exotic Creatures and a Stolen Dream	Ukraine
18 January 2023	Lazuli	11	France
20 January 2023	Katatonia	Sky Void of Stars	Sweden
20 January 2023	Riverside	ID.Entity	Poland
27 January 2023	Uriah Heep	Chaos & Colour	UK
3 February 2023	Zopp	Dominion	UK
3 March 2023	Enslaved	Heimdal	Norway
3 March 2023	Haken	Fauna	UK
10 March 2023	Periphery	Periphery V: Djent Is Not a Genre	USA
17 March 2023	Kamelot	The Awakening	USA
17 March 2023	RPWL	Crime Scene	Germany
18 March 2023	Karfagen	Birds	Ukraine
24 March 2023	Karfagen	Passage to the Forest of Mysterious	Ukraine
24 March 2023	Ne Obliviscaris	Exul	Australia
31 March 2023	Sunchild	Time and the Tide	Ukraine
7 April 2023	HMLTD	The Worm	UK
21 April 2023	Jethro Tull	RökFlöte	UK
21 April 2023	The Mars Volta	Que Dios Te Maldiga Mi Corazón	USA
28 April 2023	Hawkwind	The Future Never Waits	UK
28 April 2023	Karmic Juggernaut	Phantasmagloria	USA
30 April 2023	Il Balletto di Bronzo	Lemures	Italy
12 May 2023	Veil of Maya	[m]other	USA
15 May 2023	Mystery	Redemption	Canada
19 May 2023	Arjen Lucassen's Supersonic Revolution	Golden Age of Music	Netherlands
19 May 2023	The Ocean	Holocene	Germany
19 May 2023	Sleep Token	Take Me Back to Eden	UK
19 May 2023	Yes	Mirror to the Sky	UK
26 May 2023	Seven Impale	Summit	Norway
26 May 2023	Sparks	The Girl Is Crying in Her Latte	USA
2 June 2023	Avenged Sevenfold	Life Is But a Dream...	USA
2 June 2023	Lars Fredrik Frøislie	Fire Fortellinger	Norway
9 June 2023	Karfagen	Dragon Island	Ukraine
16 June 2023	King Gizzard & the Lizard Wizard	PetroDragonic Apocalypse	Australia
16 June 2023	Motorpsycho	Yay!	Norway
16 June 2023	Sigur Rós	Átta	Iceland
16 June 2023	Thy Catafalque	Alföld	Hungary
23 June 2023	Eloy	Echoes From the Past	Germany
30 June 2023	Big Big Train	Ingenious Devices	UK
30 June 2023	Soft Machine	Other Doors	UK
14 July 2023	Agusa	Prima Materia	Sweden
14 July 2023	Strawbs	The Magic of It All	UK
14 July 2023	Voyager	Fearless in Love	Australia
21 July 2023	Voivod	Morgöth Tales	Canada
11 August 2023	Neal Morse	The Dreamer - Joseph: Part One	USA
1 September 2023	Soen	Memorial	Sweden
8 September 2023	The Flower Kings	Look at You Now	Sweden
15 September 2023	Baroness	Stone	USA
15 September 2023	TesseracT	War of Being	UK
15 September 2023	The Chronicles of Father Robin	The Songs & Tales of Airoea – Book I: The Tale of Father Robin (State of Nature)	Norway
29 September 2023	Steven Wilson	The Harmony Codex	UK
6 October 2023	The Dear Hunter	Migrant (Revisited)	USA
6 October 2023	Jordsjø	Salighet	Norway
6 October 2023	Roger Waters	The Dark Side of the Moon Redux	UK
12 October 2023	Le Orme	...And Friends	Italy
17 October 2023	betcover!!	馬 (Uma)	Japan
20 October 2023	Galahad	The Long Goodbye	UK
20 October 2023	Ozric Tentacles	Lotus Unfolding	UK
27 October 2023	Closure in Moscow	Soft Hell	Australia
27 October 2023	King Gizzard & the Lizard Wizard	The Silver Cord	Australia
27 October 2023	Pattern-Seeking Animals	Spooky Action at a Distance	USA
3 November 2023	Gong	Unending Ascending	International
10 November 2023	D'Virgilio, Morse & Jennings	Sophomore	USA/UK
1 December 2023	Peter Gabriel	i/o	UK
8 December 2023	The Chronicles of Father Robin	The Songs & Tales of Airoea – Book II: Ocean Traveller (Metamorphosis)	Norway

=== Events ===
- In September 2023, Thank You Scientist announced that their singer, Salvator Marrano, was leaving the band to spend more time with his family.

== 2024 ==
=== Albums ===
Release Date	Artist	Album	Country
5 January 2024	Karfagen	Messages from Afar: Second Nature	Ukraine
12 January 2024	Neal Morse	The Restoration: Joseph - Part Two	USA
19 January 2024	Glass Beach	plastic death	USA
19 January 2024	SLIFT	Ilion	France
26 January 2024	Caligula's Horse	Charcoal Grace	Australia
26 January 2024	Karfagen	Messages from Afar: The Working Tapes	Ukraine
26 January 2024	The Smile	Wall of Eyes	UK
9 February 2024	The Pineapple Thief	It Leads to This	UK
14 February 2024	Various Artists	Reimagining The Court of the Crimson King	International
16 February 2024	Ihsahn	Ihsahn	Norway
16 February 2024	Sean Ono Lennon	Asterisms	USA
16 February 2024	Steve Hackett	The Circus and the Nightwhale	UK
23 February 2024	The Chronicles of Father Robin	The Songs & Tales of Airoea – Book III: Magical Chronicle (Ascension)	Norway
23 February 2024	Monkey3	Welcome to the Machine	Switzerland
23 February 2024	Semiramis	La fine non esiste	Italy
23 February 2024	Sleepytime Gorilla Museum	of the Last Human Being	USA
1 March 2024	Big Big Train	The Likes of Us	UK
5 April 2024	Extra Life	The Sacred Vowel	USA
5 April 2024	Hawkwind	Stories From Time And Space	UK
15 April 2024	Le Orme	Il leone e la bandiera	Italy
19 April 2024	Elephant9	Mythical River	Norway
3 May 2024	Agusa	Noir (OST)	Sweden
4 May 2024	Celeste	Echi di un futuro passato	Italy
10 May 2024	The Tangent for One	To Follow Polaris	International
17 May 2024	Intervals	Memory Palace	Canada
24 May 2024	Karfagen	Land of Chameleons	Ukraine
6 June 2024	Jadis	More Questions Than Answers	UK
14 June 2024	Airbag	The Century of the Self	Norway
14 June 2024	Angine de Poitrine	Vol. 1	Canada
14 June 2024	The Decemberists	As It Ever Was, So It Will Be Again	USA
28 June 2024	Kaipa	Sommargryningsljus	Sweden
19 July 2024	Deep Purple	=1	UK
9 August 2024	King Gizzard & the Lizard Wizard	Flight b741	Australia
23 August 2024	Jon Anderson & The Band Geeks	True	UK/USA
30 August 2024	Bent Knee	Twenty Pills Without Water	USA
30 August 2024	Leprous	Melodies of Atonement	Norway
30 August 2024	Nektar	Mission to Mars	UK
6 September 2024	David Gilmour	Luck and Strange	UK
6 September 2024	Pure Reason Revolution	Coming Up to Consciousness	UK
13 September 2024	Big Big Train	A Flare on the Lens	UK
13 September 2024	Motorpsycho	Neigh!!	Norway
20 September 2024	Nightwish	Yesterwynde	Finland
27 September 2024	Steve Howe	Guitarscape	UK
27 September 2024	Weather Systems	Ocean Without a Shore	UK
4 October 2024	Geordie Greep	The New Sound	UK
4 October 2024	The Smile	Cutouts	UK
11 October 2024	Needlepoint	Remnants of Light	Norway
18 October 2024	Frost*	Life In The Wires	UK
25 October 2024	Devin Townsend	PowerNerd	Canada
25 October 2024	Von Hertzen Brothers	In Murmuration	Finland
1 November 2024	Beardfish	Songs for Beating Hearts	Sweden
8 November 2024	Neal Morse & The Resonance	No Hill for a Climber	USA
15 November 2024	Thy Catafalque	XII: A gyönyörü álmok ezután jönnek	Hungary
22 November 2024	Opeth	The Last Will and Testament	Sweden
1 December 2024	AraPacis	Nucleus of Chaos	Canada
6 December 2024	Karfagen & Antony Kalugin	Constellations	Ukraine

=== Events ===
- In August 2024, Black Midi announced that they were going on an indefinite hiatus. Members Geordie Greep and Cameron Picton announced solo projects shortly thereafter.

== 2025 ==
=== Albums ===
Release Date	Artist	Album	Country
15 January 2025	The Ryszard Kramarski Project	FATHERSON	Poland
17 January 2025	Broers + Klazinga	Second Thoughts	Netherlands
17 January 2025	Steve Hackett	Live Magic at the Trading Boundaries	UK
24 January 2025	Riverside	Live ID	Poland
1 February 2025	Mark Trueack	Save Us	Australia/Thailand
7 February 2025	Dream Theater	Parasomnia	USA
7 February 2025	Squid	Cowards	UK
14 February 2025	The Adekaem	Pictures From Sierra Morena	Poland
14 February 2025	Pattern-Seeking Animals	Friend Of All Creatures	USA
21 February 2025	Motorpsycho	Motorpsycho	Norway
24 February 2025	Dave Kerzner	IT - A Celebration of The Lamb Lies Down on Broadway	USA
28 February 2025	Banco del Mutuo Soccorso	Storie Invisibili	Italy
28 February 2025	Everon	Shells	Germany
28 February 2025	Eye 2 Eye	Lost Horizon	France
28 February 2025	Gleb Kolyadin	Mobula	Russia
28 February 2025	Mostly Autumn	Seawater	UK
5 March 2025	Submarine Silence	Atonement of a Former Sailor Turned Painter	Italy
7 March 2025	Echolyn	Time Silent Radio VII & II	USA
7 March 2025	Unitopia	Alive and Kicking	Australia
7 March 2025	Hats Off Gentlemen It's Adequate	The Uncertainty Principle	UK
7 March 2025	Ghost Of The Machine	Empires Must Fall	UK
7 March 2025	Karmakanic	Transmutation	Sweden
7 March 2025	Gino Vannelli	The Life I Got (To My Most Beloved)	UK
7 March 2025	District 97	Live for the Ending	USA
7 March 2025	Jethro Tull	Curious Ruminant	UK
7 March 2025	John Lodge	Love Will Conquer All - EP	Multi-National
14 March 2025	Jon Anderson & The Band Geeks	Perpetual Change - Live	USA
14 March 2025	Coheed and Cambria	Vaxis – Act III: The Father of Make Believe	USA
14 March 2025	Steven Wilson	The Overview	UK
28 March 2025	IQ	Dominion	UK
11 April 2025	Bjørn Riis	Fimbulvinter	Norway
11 April 2025	Epica	Aspiral	Netherlands
11 April 2025	Glass Hammer	Rogue	USA
11 April 2025	Karfagen	Omni	Ukraine
11 April 2025	The Mars Volta	Lucro Sucio; Los Ojos del Vacio	USA
18 April 2025	Hawkwind	There Is No Space for Us	UK
25 April 2025	Jordsjø & Breidablik	Konstraster	Norway
25 April 2025	Oak	The Third Sleep	Norway
2 May 2025	The Flower Kings	Love	Sweden
9 May 2025	Lars Fredrik Frøislie	Gamle Mester	Norway
16 May 2025	Magic Pie	Maestro	Norway
6 June 2025	Katatonia	Nightmares as Extensions of the Waking State	Sweden
11 June 2025	betcover!!	勇気 (Yuki)	Japan
13 June 2025	King Gizzard & the Lizard Wizard	Phantom Island	Australia
18 July 2025	Dave Bainbridge	On the Edge (of What Could Be)	UK
18 July 2025	Styx	Circling from Above	USA
1 August 2025	Discipline	Breadcrumbs	USA
5 September 2025	Green Carnation	A Dark Poem, Pt. I: The Shores of Melancholia	Norway
12 September 2025	Arjen Anthony Lucassen	Songs No One Will Hear	Netherlands
12 September 2025	Between the Buried and Me	The Blue Nowhere	UK
12 September 2025	The Sound of Animals Fighting	The Maiden	USA
18 September 2025	Cardiacs	LSD	UK
26 September 2025	Amorphis	Borderland	Finland
1 October 2025	Andrew Latimer	War Stories	UK
31 October 2025	Gazpacho	Magic 8-Ball	Norway
31 October 2025	Lunatic Soul	The World Under Unsun	Poland
7 November 2025	Midlake	A Bridge to Far	USA
21 November 2025	Spock's Beard	The Archaeoptimist	USA
28 November 2025	Moron Police	Pachinko	Norway

== 2026 ==
=== Albums ===
Release Date	Artist	Album	Country
16 January 2026	Soen	Reliance	Sweden
30 January 2026	Hällas	Panorama	Sweden
30 January 2026	Lazuli	Être et ne plus être	France
6 February 2026	Big Big Train	Woodcut	UK
6 February 2026	Karnivool	In Verses	Australia
27 February 2026	Motorpsycho	The Gaia II Space Corps	Norway
27 February 2026	The Neal Morse Band	L.I.F.T.	USA
13 March 2026	Gong	Bright Spirit	International
13 March 2026	Soft Machine	Thirteen	UK
20 March 2026	The Dear Hunter	Sunya	USA
3 April 2026	Angine de Poitrine	Vol. II	Canada
3 April 2026	Green Carnation	A Dark Poem, Pt. II: Sanguis	Norway
17 April 2026	Crimson Glory	Chasing the Hydra	USA
24 April 2026	Plini	An Unnameable Desire	Australia
15 May 2026	Periphery	A Pale White Dot	USA
29 May 2026	Devin Townsend	The Moth	Canada
29 May 2026	Elder	Through Zero	USA
5 June 2026	Evergrey	Architects of a New Weave	Sweden
5 June 2026	SLIFT	Fantasia	France
12 June 2026	Horse Lords	Demand to Be Taken to Heaven Alive!	USA

== See also ==
- Timeline of progressive rock: other decades: 1960s – 1970s – 1980s – 1990s – 2000s – 2010s
- Timeline of progressive rock (Parent article)
- Progressive rock
- Canterbury Scene
- Symphonic rock
- Avant-rock
- Rock in Opposition
- Neo-prog
- Progressive metal
- Jazz fusion
- Djent
