= Colossus =

Colossus, Colossos, or the plural Colossi or Colossuses, may refer to:

== Statues ==
- Any exceptionally large statue; the term colossal statue is generally taken to mean a statue at least twice life-size
  - List of tallest statues
  - Category:Colossal statues
- Apennine Colossus, a stone statue created as a personification of the Apennine mountains
- Colossus of Barletta, a bronze statue of an unidentified Roman emperor
- Colossus of Constantine, a bronze and marble statue of the Roman emperor Constantine the Great
- Colossi of Memnon, two stone statues of Pharaoh Amenhotep III
- Colossus of Nero, a bronze statue of the Roman emperor Nero
- Colossus of Ramesses II
- Colossus of Rhodes, a bronze statue of the Greek god Helios

== Amusement rides ==
- Colossus (Ferris wheel), Ferris wheel at Six Flags St. Louis, Missouri, US
- Colossus, a pirate ship at Robin Hill theme park, Isle of Wight, UK

=== Roller coasters ===
- Colossos (Heide Park), in Lower Saxony, Germany
- Colossus (Six Flags Magic Mountain), in California, US
- Colossus (Thorpe Park), in Surrey, UK
- Colossus the Fire Dragon, at Lagoon amusement park, Utah, US

== Art, entertainment, and media ==
=== Fictional entities ===
- Colossus (character), a character in the X-Men series
- Colossi, the eponymous enemies in Shadow of the Colossus
- GTVA Colossus, a spacefaring warship in FreeSpace 2

=== Film ===
- Colossus of the Arena, a 1962 Italian sword-and-sandal film based on the character Maciste
- Colossus and the Headhunters, a 1963 Italian sword-and-sandal film based on the character Maciste
- Colossus: The Forbin Project, a 1970 American science-fiction thriller based on the D. F. Jones novel

=== Games ===
- Colossus Chess, a series of chess-playing programs

=== Literature ===
- Colossus (collection), short stories by Donald Wandrei
- Colossus (novel), 1966 science fiction novel by D. F. Jones

=== Music ===
- Colossus Records, an American label
- Colossus (band), an American Christian metal band from Sioux Falls, South Dakota

==== Albums ====
- Colossus (Scorn album), 1993
- Colossus (Walt Mink album), 1997
- Colossus, by Triggerfinger, 2017
- Colossus (EP), by Caligula's Horse, 2011

==== Songs ====
- "Colossus", by Afro Celt Sound System from Volume 3: Further in Time
- "Colossus", by Borknagar from Quintessence
- "Colossus", by Caligula's Horse from Colossus
- "Colossus", by Idles from Joy as an Act of Resistance
- "Colossus", by In Mourning from The Weight of Oceans
- "Colossus", by Jinjer from Wallflowers
- "Colossus", by Lightning Bolt from Earthly Delights
- "Colossus", by Omega Lithium from Kinetik
- "Colossus", by Thomas Bangalter from Trax On Da Rocks Vol.2
- "Colossus", by Tyler, the Creator from Wolf

== Computing ==
- Colossus computer, a very early programmable electronic digital computer, used for code breaking in World War II
- Colossus, the codename for a new version of the Google File System
- COLOSSUS, the software program controlling the Apollo Guidance Computer in the command module of the Apollo missions
- Colossus (data center), developed by SpaceXAI/xAI in Memphis, Tennessee

== Warships ==
- Colossus class (disambiguation) (UK)
- French ship Colosse
- HMS Colossus (UK)
- USS Colossus (US)

== Other uses ==
- Colossus Cinemas, a Canadian movie theater brand
- Colossus, a reticulated python once considered the largest snake in captivity

== See also ==
- The Colossus (disambiguation)
- Colossus Bridge (disambiguation)
- Colossae, an ancient city of Phrygia
- Colossal (disambiguation)
- Colosseum (disambiguation)
- Kolossus (disambiguation)
