= In Contact =

Studio album by Caligula's Horse
- Released: 15 September 2017
- Studio: Studio Circuit, Burleigh Heads, Queensland; Sam Vallen's House; Shining Studios, Oslo, Norway (Saxophone)
- Genre: Progressive metal; progressive rock
- Length: 61:54
- Label: Inside Out Music
- Producer: Sam Vallen

Caligula's Horse chronology
Bloom (2015)	In Contact (2017)	Rise Radiant (2020)

Singles from In Contact
- 1. "Will's Song (Let the Colours Run)" Released: 4 August 2017; 2. "Songs for No One" Released: 31 August 2017

In Contact is the fourth studio album by Australian progressive metal band Caligula's Horse. It was released through Inside Out Music on 15 September 2017. It is the first album to feature rhythm guitarist Adrian Goleby and drummer Josh Griffin, and the last to feature bassist Dave Couper.

== Track listing ==
All lyrics and music by Grey and Vallen.

No.	Title	Length
1.	"Dream the Dead"	8:10
2.	"Will's Song (Let the Colours Run)"	4:43
3.	"The Hands Are the Hardest"	4:26
4.	"Love Conquers All"	2:21
5.	"Songs for No One"	7:44
6.	"Capulet"	3:24
7.	"Fill My Heart"	6:42
8.	"Inertia and the Weapon of the Wall" (monologue)	2:57
9.	"The Cannon's Mouth"	5:56
10.	"Graves"	15:31
Total length:		61:54

Digital release bonus track
No.	Title	Length
11.	"Atlas (Revisited)" (re-recording of the original song featured in The Tide, the Thief & River's End)	5:10
Total length:		67:04

== Personnel ==
Caligula's Horse

- Jim Grey – lead vocals
- Sam Vallen – lead guitar, production, audio engineering, mixing (tracks 4, 6–10)
- Adrian Goleby – rhythm guitar, photography
- Dave Couper – bass, backing vocals
- Josh Griffin – drums

Additional musicians

- Jørgen Munkeby – saxophone, backing vocals (track 10)
- Jake Morton, John Grey, Mitch Legg, Rick Collins, Sam Grey, Zac Greensill and Zak Muller – additional unclean and clean vocals

Additional personnel

- Connor Maguire – artwork
- Chris Stevenson-Mangos – design, layout
- Dale Prinsse – audio engineering
- Jens Bogren – mastering
- Forrester Savell – mixing (tracks 1, 2 and 5)
- Caleb James – mixing (track 3)

== Charts ==
Chart performance for In Contact
Chart (2017)	Peak position
Australian Albums (ARIA)	50
