= Caza =

French comics artist (born 1941)

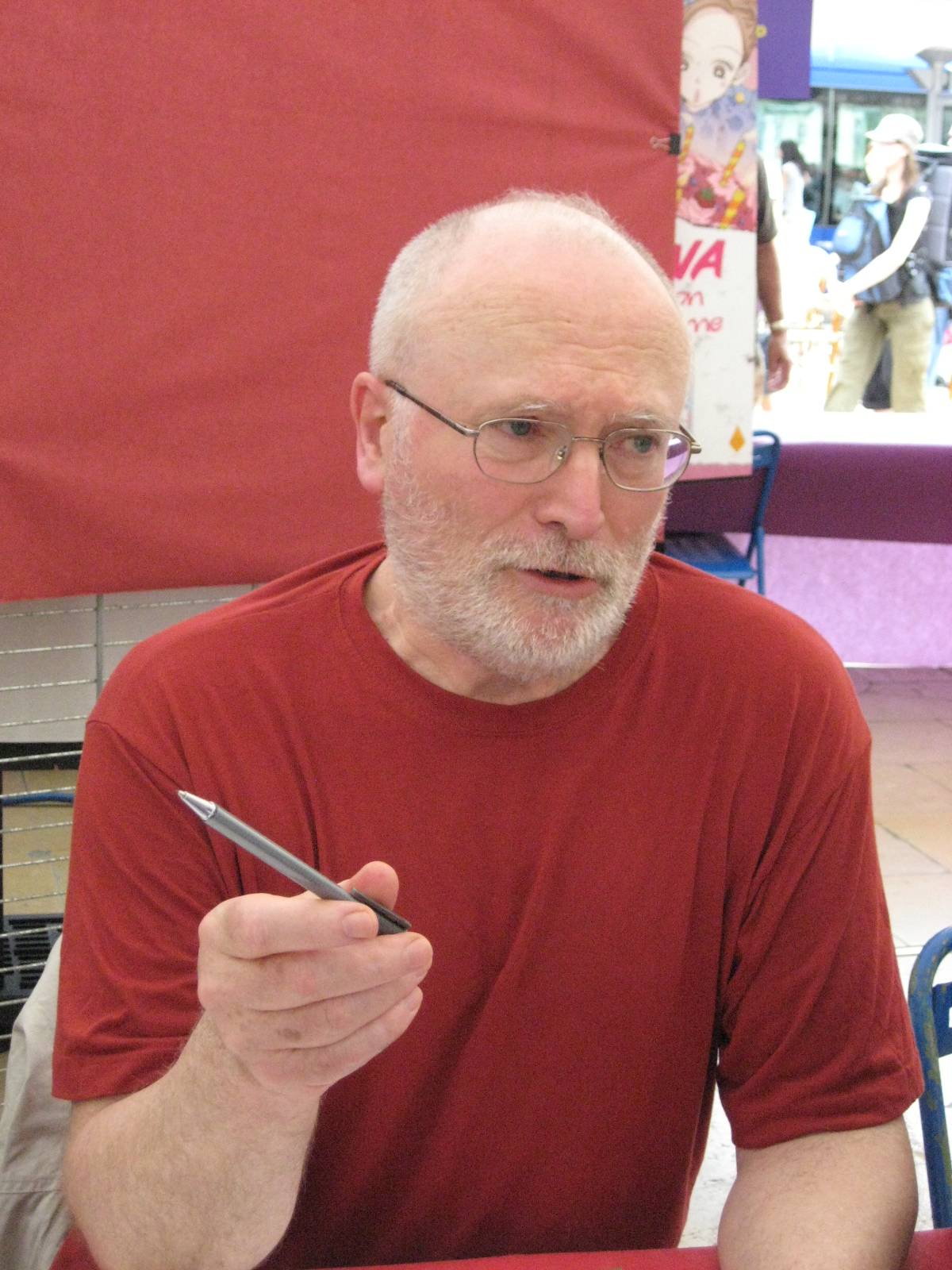
- Caza in May 2009
- Born: Philippe Cazaumayou; 14 November 1941 (age 85) Paris, France
- Areas: Artist, colourist, writer
- Notable works: Scènes de la vie de banlieue; Monde d'Arkadi; Arkhê; Laïlah
- Awards: Adamson Award (1983)

Caza (French: [kaza]), the pseudonym of Philippe Cazaumayou ([kazomaju]; born 14 November 1941), is a French comics artist.

== Biography ==
At 18, Cazaumayou started a career in advertising which lasted for ten years, but in 1970 he entered the field of bandes dessinées, releasing his first album, Kris Kool. Caza began to publish work in Pilote magazine, starting with his series Quand les costumes avaient des dents (When Costumes had Teeth) in 1971, followed by other short work. The series of stories Scènes de la vie de banlieue (Scenes of Suburban Life) was published in 1975, followed by the L'Âge d'Ombre stories, Les Habitants du crépuscule and Les Remparts de la nuit.

With the emergence of the magazine Métal Hurlant in 1975, Caza began to supply work within the science-fiction genre, with titles such as Sanguine, L'oiseau poussière, initially working with an exhaustive black and white dot technique. This was later abandoned for a style of colour use which would become a trademark, as seen in later work such as Arkhê, Chimères and Laïlah.

From 1985 to 1987, he worked closely with René Laloux on the animated film Gandahar, based on the novel by Jean-Pierre Andrevon. In 2002–2003, he worked with Philippe Leclerc on the animated film The Rain Children, based on a novel by Serge Brussolo.

== Partial bibliography ==
Cover of Kronozone (2004)

- Kris Kool (1970, Eric Losfeld, ISBN 2-85208-045-1)
- Scènes de la vie de banlieue (3 albums, 1977–1979, Dargaud)
- Arkhé (1982, Les Humanoïdes Associés, ISBN 2-7316-0180-9)
- L'âge d'ombre
  - Les habitants du crépuscule (1982, Dargaud, ISBN 2-205-02389-6)
  - Les remparts de la nuit (1984, Dargaud, ISBN 2-205-02697-6)
- Laïlah (1988, Les Humanoïdes Associés, ISBN 2-7316-0535-9)
- Le monde d'Arkadi (7 albums, 1989–2004, Les Humanoïdes Associés)
- Chroniques de la terre fixe-Nocturnes (1999, Decourt, ISBN 2-84055-277-9)
- Kronozone (2004, Delcourt, ISBN 2-84789-617-1)
- Dialogue avec l'extraterrestre (2005, Le Pythagore, ISBN 2-908456-51-6)
- Le Jardin Délicieux (2012, Quinoa Design éditions, Collection CAZA/eBOOK ISBN 979-10-91962-03-2)

=== Newspaper cartoons ===
- Pour en finir avec 2009 (2012, Quinoa Design éditions, 2012, Collection CAZA/eBOOK eBOOK (PDF and ePUB))
- La Fin du Monde ne passera pas ! (2012, Quinoa Design éditions, Collection CAZA/eBOOK – Paper book ISBN 979-10-91962-00-1 et eBOOK (PDF ISBN 979-10-91962-01-8 et ePUB ISBN 979-10-91962-02-5)

=== Album art ===
- Slift, Ummon (2020)

== General and cited sources ==
- Caza publications in Pilote and Métal Hurlant BDoubliées (in French)
- Caza albums Bedetheque (in French)
