= Bloom (Caligula's Horse album) =

Studio album by Caligula's Horse
- Released: 16 October 2015
- Studio: Heaven's Gate Studios, Brisbane
- Genre: Progressive metal; progressive rock
- Length: 44:53
- Label: Inside Out Music
- Producer: Sam Vallen

Caligula's Horse chronology
The Tide, the Thief & River's End (2013)	Bloom (2015)	In Contact (2017)

Singles from Bloom
- 1. "Marigold" Released: 29 September 2015; 2. "Firelight" Released: 13 October 2015; 3. "Turntail" Released: 22 March 2016

Bloom is the third studio album by Australian progressive metal band Caligula's Horse. It was released through Inside Out Music on 16 October 2015 in Australia and 30 October 2015 in the United States. The album was recorded at Luna Audio Studios on the Gold Coast alongside Sam Vallen's personal studio, mixed by Brendan Anthony at Heaven's Gate Studios in Brisbane, then mastered by Jens Bogren. The album was produced by guitarist Sam Vallen. It is the last to feature rhythm guitarist Zac Greensill and drummer Geoff Irish.

== Background ==
In June 2015, it was announced that Caligula's Horse had signed for a "worldwide deal" with Inside Out Music (Century Media Records). Additionally, the band announced they would be touring Australia and, for the first time, Europe later that year. Vocalist Jim Grey described the signing as "a huge step for us".

In July 2015, the band revealed that their third album Bloom would be released that year in Europe on 16 October and in the United States on 30 October. Commenting on the news, Grey stated: "Bloom is very special to all of us – it's an album full of colour and life, vibrancy and energy, but one that breathes in and out with a natural ebb and flow…It's exactly what we hoped to achieve with Caligula's Horse. To us, this album has a life of its own." The band also announced dates for an extensive tour throughout Australia and Europe in support of the upcoming release.

In August 2015, Team Rock reported the track listing for the impending album featuring a short YouTube video of Jim Grey introducing each member of the band, where Grey describes Bloom as "a step away from darkness". On 29 September 2015, premiere video single "Marigold" was featured by Revolver. Grey told Revolver that the song "captures the essence of Bloom" with "pure energy", "vibrant colour", and a "powerful, uplifting message". Grey went on to discuss the theme of the song, saying "a person can not be judged by what they earn, or what they own, but by those they love, and those that love them. In that respect, I am a wealthy, wealthy man. This song is very important to me on a personal level."

Second video single "Firelight" debuted via Billboard on 13 October 2015. In an interview with Christa Titus, Grey revealed that the song is dedicated to a friend who died in 2014. Titus described the track as "closer to a traditional pop structure" and more "easygoing" compared to previous work. Grey explains this change of pace as a "natural growth" of the band's sound to avoid repeating themselves and to write "music with a message of self-belief and optimism" as "part of a step forward". Grey elaborated that this was a deliberate contrast to progressive metal that he described as sometimes "very introspective and dark" in an effort to "celebrate life" and "the beauty of life's fragility."

"Turntail", the third single from Bloom, was reported by Team Rock in March 2016. The accompanying music video was co-directed by Jim Grey and Sam Vallen. Filmed at GC Studios in Molendinar, the video features a brightly colored dancer trapped in darkness by an "eternal force" and "her own fear". She struggles against her captor while colour gradually returns eventually freeing herself. Jim Grey described the song as "powerful, energetic, melodic and forthright", a song about "taking a stand, about fighting for freedom in whatever way you can". Commenting on the message of the song, Grey observed "Considering the atrocious political climate in Australia and worldwide, I don't think we could have released this single at a more appropriate time."

== Critical reception ==
Professional ratings
Review scores
Source	Rating
Heavy Blog is Heavy	4.5/5
It Djents	9/10
Metal Injection	9/10
Metal Obsession	Positive
Metal Temple	8/10
New Noise Magazine	4/5 stars
The Power of Metal	8/10
Rolling Stone Australia	3/5 stars

Upon its release, the album was met with generally favorable reviews by metal and rock music critics. Riley Rowe of Metal Injection gave the album a positive review, stating that "Bloom [is] an extraordinary exploitation of progressive metal at its finest" with "[musicality that uncovers] a plethora of impressive songwriting and virtuosity." Eric May of New Noise Magazine described the album as "a work of art [that] needs to be further embraced by listeners as a whole", as well as "memorable progressive rock music".

== Track listing ==
Lyrics and music by Grey and Vallen. Additional music and lyric contributions by Greensill on tracks 2 and 4.

No.	Title	Length
1.	"Bloom"	3:14
2.	"Marigold"	6:19
3.	"Firelight"	4:38
4.	"Dragonfly"	9:23
5.	"Rust"	5:32
6.	"Turntail"	5:02
7.	"Daughter of the Mountain"	7:55
8.	"Undergrowth"	2:50
Total length:		44:53

Digital release bonus track
No.	Title	Length
9.	"This City Has No Empathy" (acoustic version of the original song featured in Moments from Ephemeral City)	6:12
Total length:		51:07

== Personnel ==
Caligula's Horse

- Jim Grey – lead vocals
- Sam Vallen – lead guitar, engineering, production, mixing (track 8)
- Zac Greensill – rhythm guitar, backing vocals
- Dave Couper – bass, backing vocals
- Geoff Irish – drums

Additional musicians

- Holly Terrens – piano on "Dragonfly", flute

Additional personnel

- Chris Stevenson-Mangos – artwork
- Stefanie Vallen – artwork assistance, photography
- Jens Bogren – mastering
- Brendan Anthony – mixing (tracks 1–7)
