= Ilion (album) =

Studio album by Slift
- Released: 19 January 2024
- Studio: Le Manoir de Leon; Veilhes; Roubiehou
- Genre: Progressive rock
- Length: 79:04
- Label: Sub Pop
- Producer: Olivier Cussac; Jean Fossat

Slift chronology
Ummon (2020)	Ilion (2024)	Fantasia (2026)

Ilion is the third studio album by French progressive rock band Slift, released on 19 January 2024 through Sub Pop. It received acclaim from critics.

== Critical reception ==
Professional ratings
Aggregate scores
Source	Rating
Metacritic	86/100
Review scores
Source	Rating
AllMusic	4/5 stars
Beats Per Minute	74%
Kerrang!	4/5
Sputnikmusic	5/5

Ilion received a score of 86 out of 100 on review aggregator Metacritic based on five critics' reviews, indicating "universal acclaim". Fred Thomas of AllMusic called it a "journey" and a "mind-blowing sonic saga that rages, challenges, and changes more times than can be counted", writing that "the music here is dense, powerful, and unrelenting even when it turns down the volume". Olly Thomas of Kerrang! described it as "exhilaratingly expansive music balanced by a sense of darkness and foreboding, travelling simultaneously into outer space and inner turmoil" as well as "an 80-minute, double-vinyl extravaganza of sonic overload".

A staff reviewer for Sputnikmusic stated that "if Ummon felt like floating adrift in space while cosmic rays fried your soul, Ilion is the transition to a plane of existence beyond the cosmos". Ryan Dillon of Glide Magazine felt that the band "blur the lines between rock subgenres for an all-encompassing, full-body listening experience worth your undivided attention". Jasper Willems, reviewing the album for Beats Per Minute, wrote that "these eight tracks explore a more cinematic tension, with no repeating verses and chorus to speak of".

== Track listing ==
All tracks are written by Jean Fossat, Rémi Fossat, and Canek Flores.

Ilion track listing
No.	Title	Length
1.	"Ilion"	11:08
2.	"Nimh"	9:38
3.	"The Words That Have Never Been Heard"	12:31
4.	"Confluence"	8:36
5.	"Weavers' Weft"	9:41
6.	"Uruk"	9:54
7.	"The Story That Has Never Been Told"	12:34
8.	"Enter the Loop"	5:02
Total length:		79:04

== Personnel ==
Slift

- Jean Fossat – vocals, guitar, synthesizers, production, mixing
- Rémi Fossat – bass guitar, mixing
- Canek Flores – drums, piano, vibraphone

Additional contributors

- Caza – artwork
- Olivier Cussac – production, mixing, recording, synthesizers
- Benoît Gibertaud – synthesizer recording
- JJ Golden – mastering
- Guthio – layout
- Etienne Jaumet – saxophone, synthesizers
- Clemence Lagier – vocals

== Charts ==
Chart performance for Ilion
Chart (2024)	Peak position
Scottish Albums (OCC)	30
UK Album Downloads (OCC)	33
UK Independent Albums (OCC)	7
UK Rock & Metal Albums (OCC)	6
