= The Deep Sea Diver's Syndrome =

1992 novel by Serge Brussolo

- First edition (French)
- Author: Serge Brussolo
- Original title: Le Syndrome du Scaphandrier
- Language: French
- Genre: Science Fiction
- Published: 1992
- Publisher: Éditions Denoël
- ISBN: 978-1-61219-605-3

The Deep Sea Diver's Syndrome is a science fiction novel by Serge Brussolo, the first of over 150 novels by the French author to be translated into English. It was originally published in 1992, and was later translated into English by Edward Gauvin and published in 2016. The surreal story follows David Sarella, a struggling dreamer in a world where dream "ectoplasms" have replaced art. The novel features surreal imagery and settings, frequent use of dramatic irony, and blatant commentary about art.

The novel has been identified as a possible allegorical autobiography for Brussolo, and has also been compared to the imagination of the film Inception.

== Synopsis ==
David's mother is a medium who produced and shaped a smokey substance called "ectoplasm" while she dreamed. Using the ectoplasm, she could form the faces of lost loved ones during her dreams in order to fake seances. David inherits this ability to form ectoplasms, though his eventually become more solid. He and his friend Hugo start stealing from a local junk merchant named Merlin, following in his thieving mother's footsteps. Eventually David and his mother are caught, and he learns to fear the guilt and consequences of theft, which manifests itself later in his dreams of heists. Later, when these bundles of seemingly living organic matter called ectoplasms become popular among the affluent for their beauty, and among the general public for their health benefits, David becomes an artist with an ectoplasm museum, and began selling his works. Conventional artwork is deemed base and pointless in comparison with this new trend, and priceless paintings wither away on the streets, and hordes of people buy small "dreams" to cure insomnia and illness.

The book begins in the middle of a nautically themed dream, complete with pressure gauges and oceanic hallucinations. David and Nadia, his partner in crime, are attempting to rob a jewelry store using such extravagant tools as the severed hand and eye of the store owner. As David begins to lose the cohesiveness of his dream, objects begin to float, the safe starts sputtering and thumping, and the eyeball floats away. He has to jump through the front window, and is torn away before seeing that Nadia and his other companion, Jorgo the biker, get away safely. He awakens violently in his bed to find that he has produced a small ectoplasm that his museum assigned nurse, Marianne quickly whisks away.

David later sneaks into the museum to see his dream ectoplasm in quarantine, where the museum scientists put it through a battery of harsh tests to verify that it will endure being on display. After angrily condemning the harsh, uninspired carelessness of the scientists, David later visits his lover, a widowed baker named Antonine, who buys his small ectoplasms, "trinkets," to cure her insomnia. David also visits Soler Mahus, the greatest dreamer the world has ever known, whose power was drained after producing such enormous ectoplasms that filled plazas and stopped wars. Soler Mahus is left rambling and emaciated from over exertion, and he warns David that one must never block themselves from their dreams, because it poisons the world the imaginary characters live in. Marianne later finds David and tells him that due to his last dream's poor quality and durability, as well as his difficulty retrieving it, he would be put on leave and recommended for an injection that would keep him from dreaming. David rejects her offer, fearing his dream world would become poisoned and permanently inaccessible. During his medical leave, he is overcome by an incredibly strong urge to dream, and he illegally dives without medical supervision hoping to return with an ectoplasms so large and breathtaking it would dwarf even the works of Soler Mahus.

David enters a very deep dream where the difficulty of his heist is great, meaning any ectoplasm produced would be priceless. He attempts to steal a large painting of living, moving characters, but he is plagued by fear. Right before the group completes the escape, a sudden storm soaks the painting, waking the characters and ruining the heist. David and Nadia flee, while Jorgo is shot and injured. Before the dramatic scene is resolved, David is dragged forcibly out of his dream by Marianne administering an adrenaline shot after finding David asleep and alone, emaciated from days without food. David awakes bedridden and with a damaged brain, and becomes Marianne's secret, illegal patient. Marianne attempts to get close to David, but his hatred for her causes him to desperately search for a way back to his dream world. Upon doing so, He finds his dream world in a state of horrible disrepair, and his role changes from thief to owner and proprietor as he begins to repair his dream town from the damage inflicted by his mental trauma. Eventually, the world begins to bloom with many plants, which causes David to assume that his physical body has died and given his dream one more burst of energy as it decays into nothingness.

== Characters ==
- David Sarella, a medium who goes into deep dreams or "dives" in which he performs various heists, reflecting his childhood tendency of thievery. Though his skill is waning, he still strives to become a great dreamer whose ectoplasms are appreciated for their artistic value.
- Nadia, David's female dream heist companion. David genuinely believes she is real, with a mind of her own, but in reality she is derived from the action novels he read as a kid, as well as his lover Antonine.
- Jorgo, the third member of David's dream gang. Jorgo is a kid who works on various bikes and facilitates David and Nadia's getaway. His name and actions closely resemble David's childhood friend Hugo, who was obsessed with riding his bicycle. Hugo would carry David away after he stole from a local junk shop, providing the material for Jorgo's character in David's dreams.
- Marianne, the museum prescribed nurse that cares for David while he dives. She is cold and logical, and she disdains his fanciful descriptions of his dreams, sticking with her own medical descriptions. She is quintessentially uptight. While she does help David when he becomes sick, David still despises her.
- Antonine, a baker and David's lover. She is a retired boxer who bakes the only bread that David will eat. She spends all of her money and savings on small ectoplasm trinkets which help her sleep. She only sees the practical benefits of dream ectoplasms and not their artistic value.
- Soler Mahus, a former department store employee until his gift as a medium became fashionable. His dream world consisted of a savanna, with him as an indomitable hunter accompanied by a local savage. He went on to become the world's most famous medium, producing works that filled large spaces and radiated healing. He stopped a war by producing the single largest ectoplasm overnight, also causing his sickness and loss of ability. His fall from success and loss of his dream world cause David to fear the same fate for himself.
- David's mother, was also a medium. She used to conjure up images of people, and faked seances by using her ability to make ectoplasms that matched memorized pictures. She is the source of David's ability as a medium. Her tendency to steal encouraged David to do the same, which formed the basis for David's dreams. She smoked incessantly, and was not very sociable.
- David's father, a travelling salesman that eventually stops returning after David is caught stealing and his mother defends him.
- Hugo, David's childhood friend who was obsessed with riding his bicycle. He trained hard, and believed certain pills would give him superpowers. This pill obsession influences David's dreams and is revealed by his use of stability pills and powders that influence his emotions, allowing him to carry out heists.

== Literary reviews and interpretation ==
The Deep Sea Diver's Syndrome has been praised for its imaginative plot and complex themes in a variety of reviews. While the book's weak points include flat characters and awkward development, it has been described as, "unapologetically compelling."

The novel is noted to have a strong emphasis on the role of art in society. Just as art is consumed in large volumes, David and the works of other dreamers are consumed without concern or abandon. The emphasis on the health benefits of the ectoplasms and the large market for trinkets and baubles seems to be a further critique of the consumerism found in art consumption. Further, the book could also be seen as semi-autobiographical, as a representation of Serge Brussalo searching the depths of his own mind to retrieve something that will please the masses.

Critics have noted that the novel is an effective metaphor for an artist and his or her artwork. David Sarella is the misunderstood artist, whose ectoplasms are not fully appreciated for their artistic value. In this way, the novel is urging the reader to look deeper into art, and try to appreciate what the artist is communicating.
