= Colossal =

Colossal may refer to:

- Colossal statue, generally taken to mean a statue at least twice life-size
- Colossal (film), a 2016 science fiction film starring Anne Hathaway
- (Colossal) Pictures, entertainment company which closed in 2000
- Colossal (band), American punk band formed in 2001
- "Colossal", a song by Miss May I from the album Monument
- "Colossal", a song by Scale the Summit from the album The Collective
- "Colossal", a song by Wolfmother from their debut album Wolfmother
- Colossal (blog), art and visual culture blog
- Colossal (chestnut), American chestnut cultivar
- Colossal Biosciences, a biotechnology company

== See also ==
- Colossal Connection, former professional wrestling tag team
- Colossal Kongs, former professional wrestling tag team
- Colossus (disambiguation)
