= Lazuli (French band) =

French progressive rock band

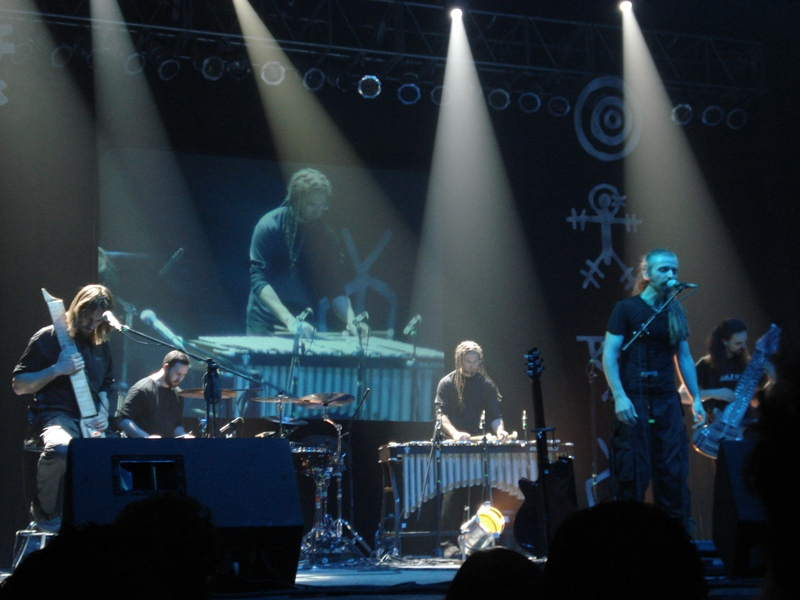
- Lazuli at Baja Prog in Mexicali, Mexico, March 2007

Background information
- Origin: Southern France
- Genres: Progressive rock, world music, electro
- Years active: 1998–present
- Label: L'Abeille Rôde
- Members: Dominique Leonetti; Claude Leonetti; Arnaud Beyney; Romain Thorel; Vincent Barnavol
- Past members: Gédéric Byar; Sylvain Bayol; Frédéric Juan; Yohan Simeon
- Website: www.lazuli-music.com

Lazuli are a French progressive rock band, formed in Southern France in 1998 by Claude and Dominique Leonetti.

== History ==
After their formation in 1998, their first album, the self-titled Lazuli, was released in 1999 and struggled in popularity. However, over many years the band have changed and refined their sound finding increased popularity and appreciation.

Their second album, Amnésie, in 2004, helped Lazuli to sign with the Night & Day distribution group.

On 2 and 3 July 2005, Lazuli attended the Montreux Jazz Festival and received an award for "Under the sky".

=== Key dates ===
- 1999 : Concert at FIMU in Belfort, France)
- 2004 : Second album "Amnésie"
- 2 & 3 July 2005 : Montreux Jazz Festival (Switzerland)
- 11 March 2006 : Baja Prog Festival in Mexicali (Mexico)
- 12 April 2006 : Concert at Colos-Saal in Aschaffenburg (Germany)
- 5 August 2006 : KOMMZ-Festival in Aschaffenburg (Germany)
- 12 August 2006: Concert in Bergerac, Dordogne (France), invited by Ange.
- 18 January 2007: Colos-Saal à Aschaffenburg (Germany)
- 2 May 2009: Rites of Spring festival (United States)
- 29 November 2009: Lazuli announce split
- 7 October 2011: Headlined the Summers End festival in Lydney United Kingdom
- 2015: Lazuli supported Fish on his entire "Farewell To Childhood" European tour in November and December 2015.

== Musical style ==
Lazuli combine progressive rock with world and electro music. Besides guitar, keyboards and drums the band plays also léode, vibraphone and horn; until 2009, split chapman stick, marimba and warr guitar were used as well.

Claude Leonetti invented and plays the léode, because he cannot use his left arm after a motorcycle accident.

Their lyrics are entirely in French.

== Band members ==
Current members

- Claude Leonetti – léode (1998–present)
- Dominique Leonetti – vocals, guitar (1998–present)
- Arnaud Beyney – guitar, bass guitar (2020–present)
- Vincent Barnavol – drums (2010–present)
- Romain Thorel – keyboards (2010–present)

Former members

- Gédéric Byar – Guitar (2007–2020)
- Fred Juan – marimba, percussion (1998–2009)
- Sylvain Bayol – chapman stick, warr guitar (1998–2009)
- Yohan Simeon – percussion (1998–2009)

== Discography ==
Studio albums

- Lazuli (1999)
- Amnésie (2004)
- En avant doute... (2007)
- Réponse incongrue à l'inéluctable (2009)
- 4603 battements (2011)
- Tant que l'herbe est grasse (2014)
- Nos âmes saoules (2016)
- Saison 8 (2018)
- Le Fantastique Envol de Dieter Böhm (2020)
- Dénudé (2021) (acoustic)
- 11 (2023)
- Lore(live) (2024)
- Être et ne plus être (2026)

Video albums

- 6 frenchmen in Amsterdam – Live at Paradiso DVD (2009)
- Live @ l'Abeille Rôde DVD (2013)
- Nos âmes saoules Live 2016 DVD (2016)
