= Colossus of Nero =

Historical bronze statue in Rome

Coordinates: 41°53′28″N 12°29′29″E

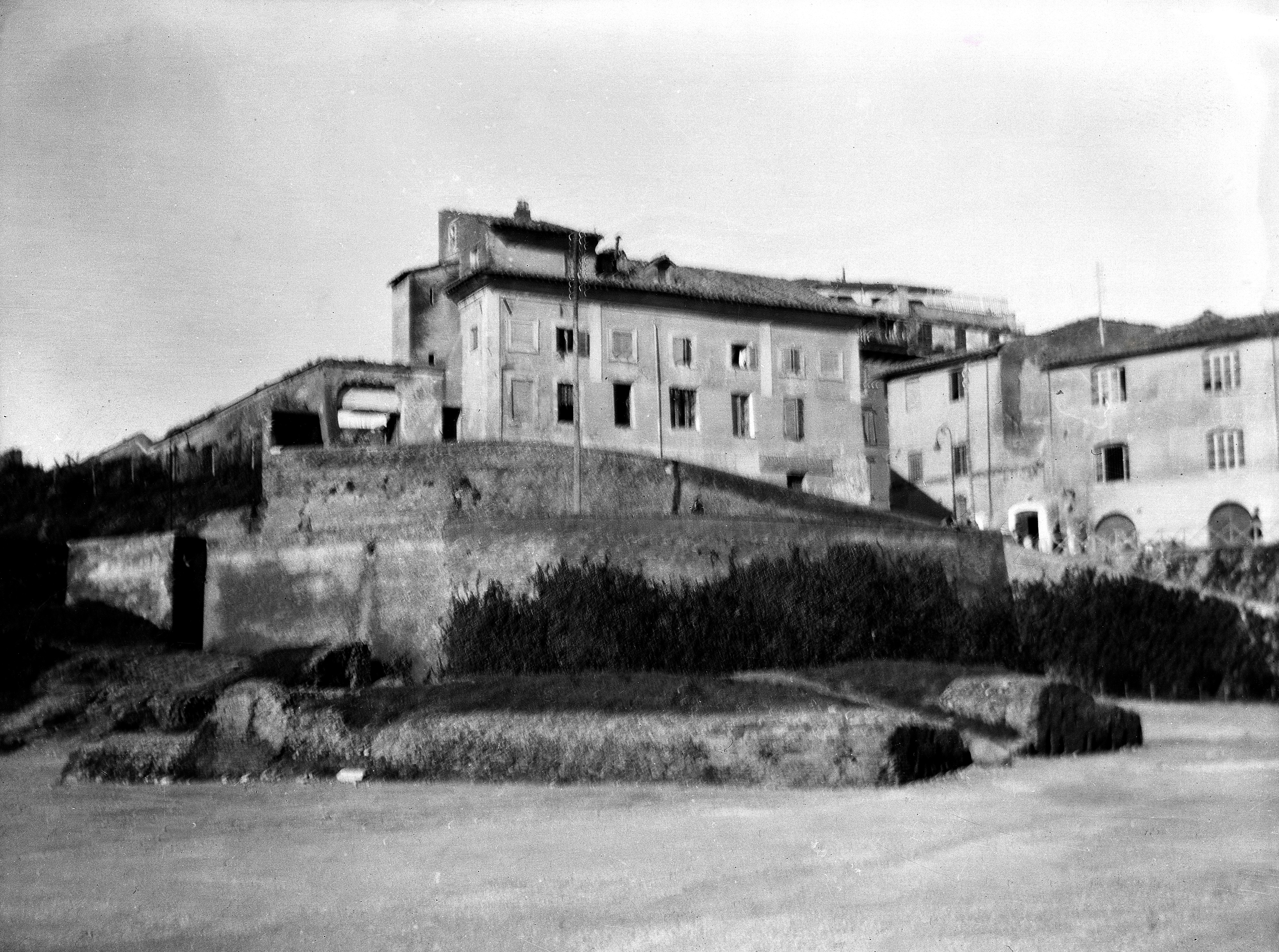
Base of the Colossus of Nero near the Colosseum, prior to its removal

The Colossus of Nero (Colossus Neronis) was a 30-metre (98 ft) bronze statue that the Emperor Nero (37–68 AD) created in the vestibule of his Domus Aurea, the imperial villa complex which spanned a large area from the north side of the Palatine Hill, across the Velian ridge to the Esquiline Hill in Rome. It was modified by Nero's successors into a statue of the sun god Sol. The statue was eventually moved to a spot outside the Flavian Amphitheatre, which (according to one of the more popular theories) became known, by its proximity to the Colossus, as the Colosseum.

The last mention of the Colossus is in an illuminated manuscript from the late 4th century AD. The statue disappeared sometime afterwards, likely toppled by an earthquake or destroyed during the Sack of Rome. Today, the only remnants of the statue are some concrete blocks that once made up the foundation of its marble pedestal.

== History ==
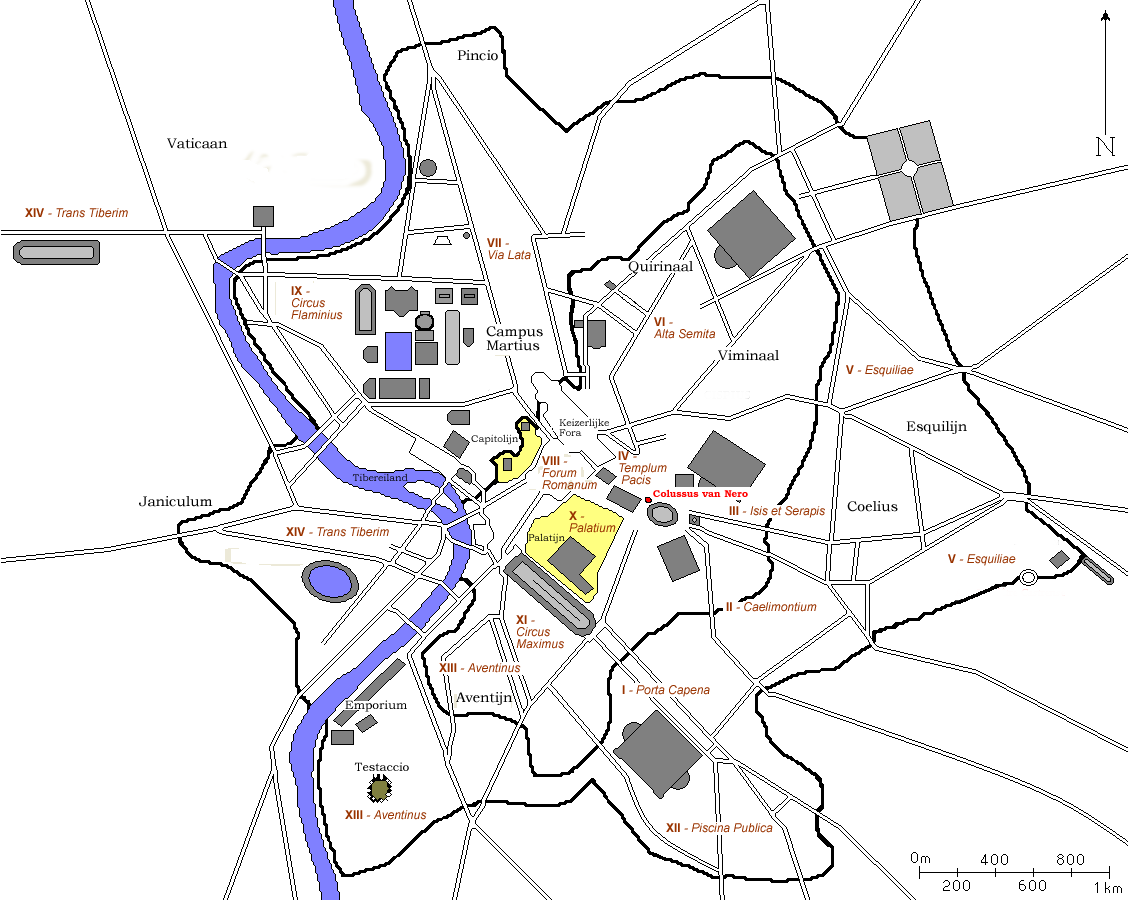
Location of the Colossus (in red near the center) on a map of Rome

The statue was placed just outside the main palace entrance at the terminus of the Via Appia in a large atrium of porticoes that divided the city from the private villa. The Greek architect Zenodorus designed the statue and began construction between AD 64 and 68. According to Pliny the Elder, the statue reached 106.5 Roman Feet (30.3 metres (99 ft)) in height, though other sources claim it was as much as 37 metres (121 ft).

Shortly after Nero's death in AD 68, the Emperor Vespasian added a radiate crown and renamed it Colossus Solis, after the Roman sun god Sol. Around 128, Emperor Hadrian ordered the statue moved from the Domus Aurea to just northwest of the Colosseum in order to create space for the Temple of Venus and Roma. It was moved by the architect Decriannus with the use of 24 elephants. Emperor Commodus converted it into a statue of himself as Hercules by replacing the head, but after his death it was restored, and so it remained.

The last certain mention from antiquity of the statue is the reference in the Chronography of 354. Today, nothing remains of the Colossus of Nero save for the foundations of the pedestal at its second location near the Colosseum. It was possibly destroyed during the Sack of Rome in 410, or toppled in one of a series of fifth-century earthquakes, and its metal scavenged.

The remains of the brick-faced masonry pedestal, once covered with marble, were removed in 1936 on the orders of Benito Mussolini. The foundations were excavated in 1986, and can be viewed by the public.

== Connection to the Colosseum ==
The name of the Roman amphitheatre, the Colosseum, is derived from this statue.

Bede (c. 672–735) wrote a famous epigram celebrating the symbolic significance of the statue:

Quandiu stabit coliseus, stabit et Roma,
quando cadit coliseus, cadet et Roma,
quando cadet Roma, cadet et mundus.

Translation:

As long as the Colossus stands, Rome will stand,
when the Colossus falls, Rome will fall,
when Rome falls, so falls the world.

This is often mistranslated to refer to the Colosseum rather than the Colossus (as in, for instance, Byron's poem Childe Harold's Pilgrimage). However, at the time that Bede wrote, the masculine noun coliseus was applied to the statue rather than to what was still known as the Amphitheatre.

== Gallery ==
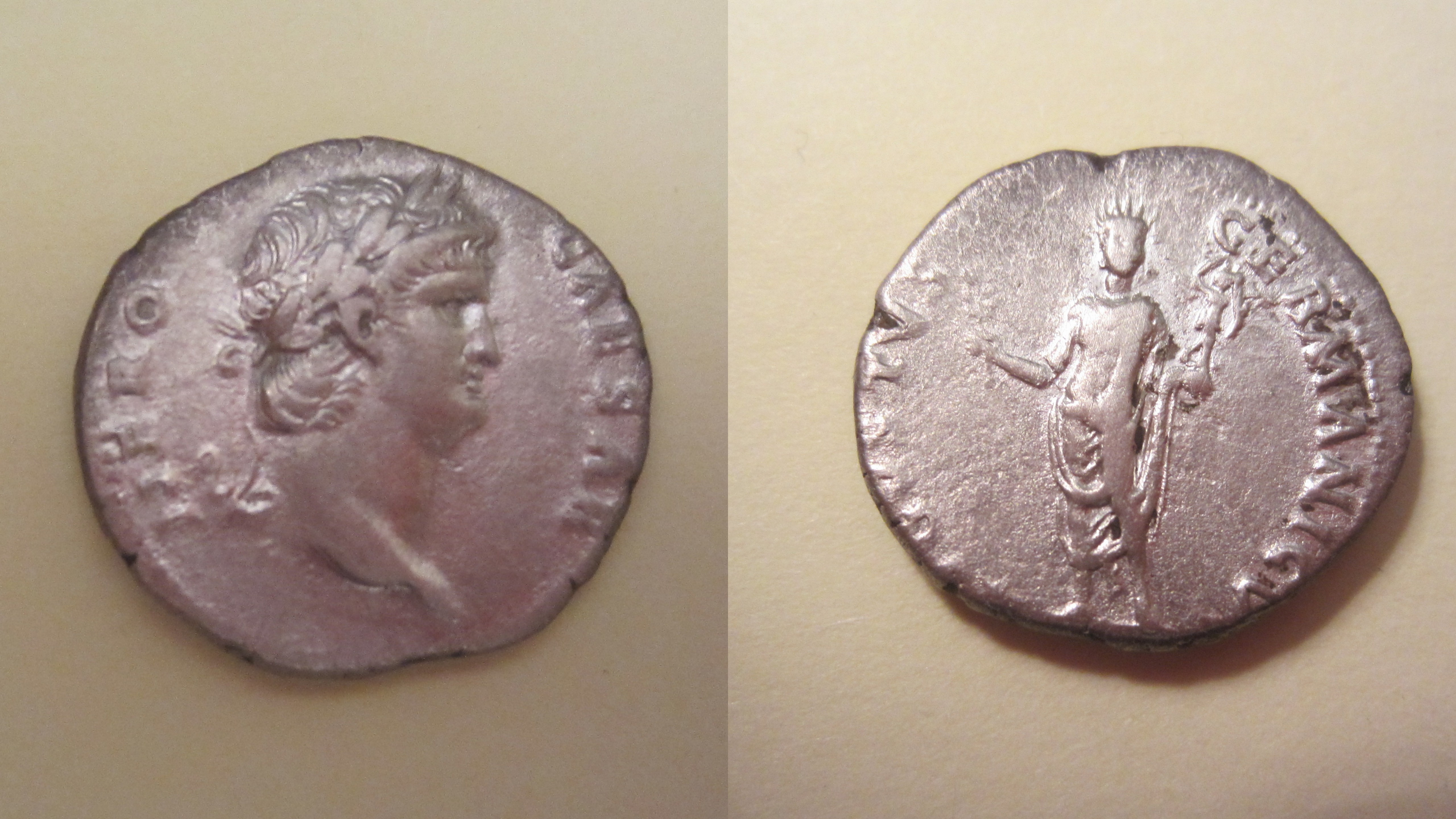
Coin of Emperor Nero showing the Colossus. Legend NERO CAESAR / AVGVSTVS GERMANICVS

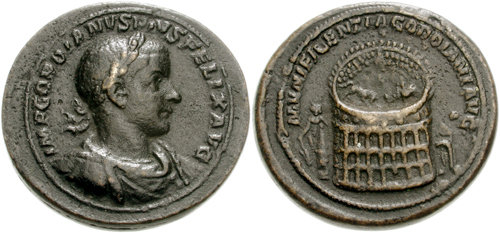
Medallion showing on obverse Gordianus III, legend IMP GORDIANVS PIVS FELIX AVG. Reverse: bull contending with elephant within the Colosseum, seen from above; Colossus of Nero and Meta Sudans, and the Temple of Venus and Rome, or the Ludus Magnus on either side; legend MVNIFICENTIA GORDIANI AVG

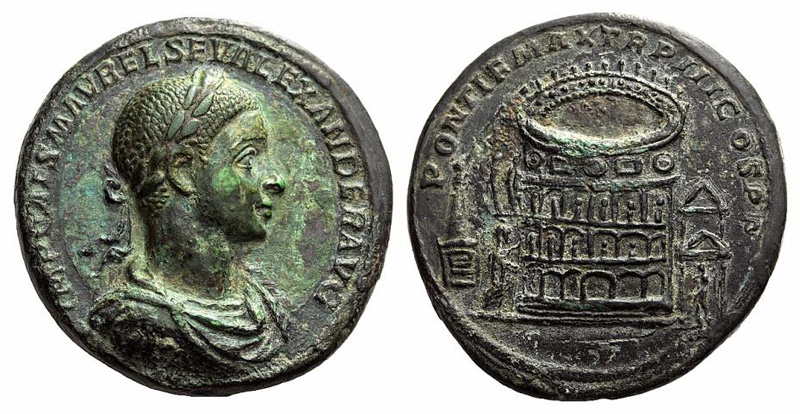
Obverse: Laureate and draped bust of Severus Alexander to right, legend IMP CAES M AVREL SEV ALEXANDER AVG. Reverse: The Amphitheatrum Flavianum (”The Colosseum”). It is shown from the front, with four stories: the first with arches, the second with arches containing statues, the third with flat-topped pedimented niches containing statues, and the fourth with square windows and circular clupea; in a bird's eye view the circular interior can also be seen with two tiers of spectators. Outside, to left, Severus Alexander stands right sacrificing over a low altar; behind him is the Meta Sudans and a large statue of Sol. To right, a two-storied distyle building with two pediments and a male statue (Jupiter?) before. Legend PONTIF MAX TR P III COS P P

== See also ==
- List of tallest statues
