= Kolossus (disambiguation) =

Kolossus is a 2008 album by Keep of Kalessin.

Kolossus may also refer to:

- Kolossus, a 2012 novel by Tim Jorgenson featuring an alternative history with Hitler
- Kolossus, a giant robot in Mega Shark vs. Kolossus
- Kolossus, a character who appeared in the ouija board games of Sylvia Plath and Ted Hughes directing her to write poems in The Colossus and Other Poems
- Ensemble Kolossus, a musical ensemble with Michael Formanek

== See also ==
- Colossus (disambiguation)
- Kolossos Rodou B.C., Greek professional basketball team
