= The Colossus =

The Colossus may refer to:

- The Colossus (album), a 2010 release by RJD2
- The Colossus (painting), generally attributed to Francisco de Goya
- "The Colossus" (The Amazing World of Gumball), a 2012 television episode
- The Colossus and Other Poems, a 1960 poetry collection by Sylvia Plath
- The Colossus of New York, a 1958 American science-fiction film

== See also ==
- Colossus (disambiguation)
