= Walled In =

2009 horror-thriller directed by Gilles Paquet-Brenner

- Directed by: Gilles Paquet-Brenner
- Written by: Serge Brussolo; Gilles Paquet-Brenner; Sylvain White; Rodoplphe Tissot; Olivier Volpi
- Produced by: Kevin DeWalt
- Starring: Mischa Barton; Cameron Bright; Deborah Kara Unger
- Cinematography: Karim Hussain
- Music by: David Kristian
- Production companies: Minds Eye International; Experiences Films; Forecast Pictures; Indigo Motion
- Distributed by: Leomax Entertainment Anchor Bay Entertainment (USA); Momentum Pictures (UK)
- Release dates: 17 March 2009 (North America); 5 October 2009 (UK)
- Running time: 100 minutes
- Countries: United Kingdom; Canada
- Language: English
- Budget: $8 million

Walled In is a 2007 Canadian horror-thriller film directed and co-written by Gilles Paquet-Brenner and starring Mischa Barton, Cameron Bright, and Deborah Kara Unger. The film is based on the best-selling French novel Les Emmurés by Serge Brussolo. It is Paquet-Brenner's English-language film debut.

== Plot ==
The film opens when a little girl, Julie (Sophi Knight), wakes up to find herself in a small concealed room, confused at what is happening. When the room starts filling with cement from all corners, the girl cries for her father, but the cement only continues to rise, and eventually she is buried alive.

Fifteen years later Samantha "Sam" Walczak (Mischa Barton) is a recent engineering graduate. At her graduation party, her father, the owner of a demolition company, gives her a gift: a job supervising the demolition of a building in the middle of nowhere. If she is successful, she will become his partner. Sam arrives at the Malestrazza Building, and is greeted by Mary (Deborah Kara Unger), the caretaker. Sam tells Mary she will be staying in one of the apartments in the building. Jimmy (Cameron Bright), the caretaker's teenage son, takes her bags to her apartment, previously owned by Julie, and explains the rules of the building: she is to stay off the eighth floor because it is Malestrazza's and the roof because it is too dangerous.

Sam researches the building and discovers that it was the scene of a horrible series of murders where sixteen people were entombed in the walls. Jimmy takes Sam to the eighth floor and tells her how his father was one of the victims, the crime being blamed on a local factory worker. The lights go out, and Sam cuts her leg after panicking in the darkness. Later, Jimmy washes her wound and begins to caress her thigh, but she tells him to stop. Sam begins having nightmares about being entombed in the walls.

Sam's boyfriend arrives, causing Jimmy to grow jealous. While exploring the eighth floor, Sam and her boyfriend discover a secret passage which would allow someone to secretly view any of the apartments. Sam realizes that Jimmy has been spying on her. Later, as Sam and her boyfriend make love, Jimmy watches from behind the walls. The next morning they find his dog butchered. Sam and her boyfriend agree to leave.

Jimmy gives Sam a copy of the journal of Joseph Malestrazza, the building's architect. Sam realizes from reading the journal that there must be a large, open space in the center of the building. Jimmy goes to the roof to look for an opening to the hidden space. When he does not return, Sam and her boyfriend follow. They discover a massive shaft in the center of the building. They hear Jimmy calling from down in the shaft, saying that he is hurt. Sam has her boyfriend lower her into the shaft on a rope, but he is shot and killed, causing Sam to fall to the bottom. Jimmy then mails Sam's demolition report and sinks her car into a lake.

Sam awakens at the bottom of the shaft and discovers that a man is there with her. He is Malestrazza, the architect, who has been trapped there by Mary. He tells her that Jimmy is keeping her down there until she learns to love him. While trapped, Sam learns that Malestrazza orchestrated the murders as a form of human sacrifice, citing the fact that, of the Seven Wonders of the Ancient World, only the Great Pyramid of Giza is still standing after thousands of years, because (he believes) it was the only one in which workers were killed and buried during its construction.

Among his victims were Mary's husband and daughter (Julie), which caused a vengeful Mary to imprison Malestrazza. He also tells Sam that Jimmy is nice, but can be very cruel and imaginative when he disobeys Jimmy's orders.

Jimmy sends down a cassette tape, with a message that he wants to see Sam and Malestrazza dance. Sam reluctantly dances, but when Jimmy tells them to kiss, she refuses. Malestrazza pulls her close and forces her to kiss him. After a few seconds, Jimmy tells them to stop and threatens Malestrazza not to touch Sam again. He sends down a basket with food, water, and a two-way radio. He tells Sam to keep the radio with her so that they can talk and be close.

Sam looks for a way to escape and realizes one wall leads to the garbage area. When Jimmy returns, she lies and says that she is hurt and needs medicine. When Jimmy brings her the medicine, she opens the capsules and starts creating a mix to try and blow out the wall to get into the garbage room. Sam's attempt fails, and Jimmy is upset that she tried to escape.

Before Jimmy could exact his punishment, his mother catches him. Mary realizes that Sam is in the hole with Malestrazza. At first she is infuriated with Jimmy as the hole was constructed for Malestrazza and no one else, but realizes Sam now knows too much and they must keep her trapped there as well in order to avoid arrest.

Sam is still stuck in the hole with Malestrazza, who she realizes does not want to escape. This is his tomb, and he picked her to kill him. She eventually does kill him after some taunting, and he thanks her after he falls into his tomb and it begins to fill with cement. Sam is by the wall hoping that Jimmy will come through and save her.

The demolition team arrives and her father asks where Sam is. Mary tells him that she left. Her father says that he thought she would want to see her first building being demolished. Mary is keeping Jimmy calm as they set up and begin to install the explosives. As the countdown begins, Jimmy comes to his senses and runs toward the building for Sam. Sam's father tells them to stop the countdown. At the roof, Jimmy looks down, and her father asks what they have done. Jimmy then throws himself over, killing himself, and lands next to Sam. Sam is then lifted out of the hole and put in an ambulance, just as Mary is being arrested and taken to prison.

Sam narrates that Malestrazza built 27 buildings and that they are all still standing. He considered the Malestrazza building his masterpiece, and there are no current plans to demolish it.

== Cast ==
- Mischa Barton as Samantha Walczak
- Cameron Bright as Jimmy
- Deborah Kara Unger as Mary
- Noam Jenkins as Peter
- Pascal Greggory as Malestrazza
- Eugene Clark as Burnett
- Jane Redlyon as Denise
- Rob van Meenen as Patrick Walczak
- Josh Strait as Vincent Walczak
- Sophi Knight as Julie

== Release ==
The film premiered at the Glasgow Film Festival on 20 February 2009.

The film received a straight-to-DVD release in North America on 17 March 2009.

There is also an accompanying graphic novel by the same name produced by Spacedog, published through Ape Entertainment, and available in April, 2009.

It was released by Momentum Pictures on DVD on 5 October 2009 in the United Kingdom.

== Reception ==
Because the film has been released straight-to-DVD, it has received limited critical reviews. The film has received a mixed reaction. DVD Talk rated the film 3/5 stars, praising the performances of the cast and the effectiveness of the low budget, though the review concluded that the film deserved a stronger conclusion. The film was rated 5/10 by IGN and had conflicting accounts of the performances of the cast, describing Barton as "terrific" and Bright as "wooden." Real Movie News described the film as "atmospheric" and "attractive" but questioned the confused identity of the film.

The British magazine FemaleFirst gave the film 4 out of 5 stars. They described it a "psychological horror that's sure to send chills down your spine" and continued to refer to it as a "gritty Mirrors meets Captivity horror thriller will have your heart pounding in your ears."
