= HMS Colossus =

Six ships of the Royal Navy have been named HMS Colossus:

- HMS Colossus (1787) was a 74-gun Courageux-class third rate ship of the line launched in 1787 and wrecked in 1798.
- HMS Colossus (1803) was a 74-gun third rate ship of the line launched in 1803. She fought at Trafalgar and was broken up in 1826.
- HMS Colossus (1848) was an 80-gun second rate ship of the line launched in 1848. She was converted to screw propulsion in 1854 and sold in 1867.
- HMS Colossus (1882) was a Colossus-class battleship launched in 1882 and sold in 1908.
- HMS Colossus (1910) was a Colossus-class dreadnought battleship launched in 1910. She fought at the Battle of Jutland and was scrapped in 1928.
- HMS Colossus (R15) was a Colossus-class light aircraft carrier launched in 1943. She was loaned to France in 1946 and renamed Arromanches. She was bought by France in 1951 and was scrapped in 1978.
