= Ummon (album) =

Studio album by Slift
- Released: 28 February 2020
- Recorded: 2019
- Studios: Condorcet; Toulouse, France
- Genres: Krautrock; progressive rock; space rock
- Length: 72:28
- Labels: Stolen Body; Vicious Circle
- Producers: Jean Fossat; Olivier Cussac

Slift chronology
La Planète Inexplorée (2018)	Ummon (2020)	Ilion (2024)

Singles from Ummon
- 1. "Ummon" Released: 19 November 2019; 2. "Hyperion" Released: 15 January 2020

Ummon is the second studio album by French progressive rock band, Slift. The album was released on 28 February 2020 through Vicious Circle. Two singles were released ahead of the album: the title track, "Ummon", in 2019, and "Hyperion" in 2020.

Album art was done by French comic artist Caza (Philippe Cazaumayou).

== Critical reception ==
Professional ratings
Review scores
Source	Rating
Classic Rock	7/10 stars
The Elite Extremophile	93/100
Louder Than War	4/5 stars
Sputnikmusic	4.5/5 stars

The album was well received by music critics. On The Elite Extremophile, the website gave Ummon a 93 out of 100 saying that Ummon "[has] harnessed the menace of doom metal, the energy of garage rock, the hypnotic repetition of krautrock, and the general strangeness of prog. They put those elements together in an impressive and intense package. This album is demanding, but it is worth your time and energy." Nathan Whittle, writing for Louder than War, gave Ummon a four out of five, saying that Ummon "the fuzz pedal clicks on though, the band launch as one in a full-on attack. On their journey, they are switching between the sounds of them slamming on the rocket boosters and then lifting off to float off into the heavens." Writing for Classic Rock magazine, Jo Kendall gave the album a 7 out of 10. Kendall compared the album to the works of Pink Floyd and Thee Oh Sees and wrote, "generally it’s all psych rockets blasting as the Toulouse trio soar to space-prog's summit," calling the album "a high-octane 11 tracker."

In a staff review for Sputnikmusic, the album was described as a "ravaging, colourful journey that pushes and breaks through boundaries without production tricks of any kind, relying on a fantastic live performance to bring to life one of the best albums of the year." The staff gave it a 4.6 out of 5.

== Track listing ==
All music is composed by Jean Fossat, Rémi Fossat, and Canek Flores.

No.	Title	Length
1.	"Ummon"	5:45
2.	"It's Coming..."	8:29
3.	"Thousand Helmets of Gold"	4:52
4.	"Citadel on a Satellite"	10:07
5.	"Hyperion"	4:27
6.	"Altitude Lake"	6:04
7.	"Sonar"	5:05
8.	"Dark Was Space, Cold Were the Stars"	5:55
9.	"Aurore aux Confins"	2:48
10.	"Sơn Đông's Cavern"	5:15
11.	"Lions, Tigers and Bears"	13:18
Total length:		72:28

== Accolades ==
Publication	Country	Accolade	Year	Rank
Rough Trade	UK	Albums of the Year 2020	2020	32
