= Hällas =

Swedish rock band from Linköping

- Origin: Jönköping, Småland, Sweden
- Genres: Hard rock; progressive rock; heavy metal; blues rock (early)
- Years active: 2011–present
- Labels: The Sign; RMV Grammofon; Napalm; Äventyr Records
- Members: Tommy Alexandersson; Marcus Petersson; Kasper Eriksson; Nicklas Malmqvist; Rickard Swahn
- Past members: Alexander Moraitis Jesper Nodbrant
- Website: www.hallasband.com

Hällas (/ˈhɛlɑːs/) are a Swedish hard rock band formed in 2011 in Jönköping, Småland, by Jesper Nodbrant, Tommy Alexandersson and Kasper Eriksson. They play a blend of progressive rock, hard rock and heavy metal inspired by 1970s bands, resulting in a genre that they call "adventure rock".

The band is named after the main character of the stories they tell in their lyrics; Hällas is a knight living in parallel, medieval universe in which "religion similarly, albeit not necessarily the ones we recognize from here, are very prevalent and where treacherous tyrants reign lands on the verge of the apocalypse and where seers have gained so much strength that they can dictate the future and the past".

== History ==
The band was founded in 2011 in Jönköping, Småland, by bassist/vocalist Tommy Alexandersson, drummer Kasper Eriksson and a guitarist as a blues rock trio, but they soon started to incorporate elements of 1980s heavy metal and to adopt a more progressive approach to songwriting. After moving to Linköping in Östergötland and splitting with their guitarist, they met guitarists Marcus Petersson and Alexander Moraitis.

They recorded their first EP at Treasuresound Studio (in Jönköping), which is managed by their current keyboardist Nicklas. Back then, he was not a member yet, but was invited to join the group because they wanted to have organs and synthesizers in their music.

After the EP, they toured extensively and started preparing their debut full-length album Excerpts from a Future Past, a conceptual one.

In early 2020, they signed with Napalm Records and released their second album, Conundrum, on 31 January. It was recorded at the Riksmixningsverket in Stockholm and peaked at #42 and #84 at the Swedish and German charts, respectively. The album ends a plot that started on their EP and continued on their debut full-length effort.

In 2020, they were nominated for a P3 Guld Award in the rock/metal category.

In December 2020, they released a video for "Carry On", a track off their second album.

In January 2022, they announced that their third full-length album, titled Isle of Wisdom, would be released on 8 April via Napalm.

In late 2025, Hällas announced their fourth studio album, Panorama, which was released on 30 January 2026. The album was met with positive critical reception; Prog Magazine praised its retro-influenced sound, describing Panorama as a "mesmerising modern masterpiece" and suggesting that, had it been released between 1972 and 1975, the band "would likely have become superstars".

== Musical style ==
Hällas's music has been described as a mixture of progressive rock, hard rock and heavy metal inspired by 1970s bands, resulting in a genre that they call "adventure rock". They cite 1970s progressive rock bands as influences, namely Genesis, Uriah Heep, Cherry Five, Wishbone Ash, Camel, Nektar, Rush, Banco del Mutuo Soccorso and Kebnekajse.

Members use both vintage and modern gear in their performances.

== Members ==
Current members (as of August 2023)

- Tommy Alexandersson – lead vocals, bass
- Rickard Swahn – guitar
- Marcus Petersson – guitar
- Nicklas Malmqvist – organ, synthesizer
- Kasper Eriksson – drums, percussion

== Discography ==
=== Studio albums ===
List of studio albums, with selected details and chart positions
Title	Album details	Peak chart positions	
Title	Album details	SWE	GER
Excerpts from a Future Past	Released: 13 October 2017; Label: Sign Records	—	—
Conundrum	Released: 14 February 2020; Label: RMV Grammofon (Scandinavia), Napalm (rest of the World)	42	84
Isle of Wisdom	Released: 8 April 2022; Label: Napalm	32	37
Panorama	Released: 30 January 2026; Label: Äventyr	10	—
"—" denotes a recording that did not chart or was not released in that territory.
