= Innate Passage =

Studio album by Elder
- Released: November 25, 2022
- Studio: Clouds Hill Studio
- Genre: Psychedelic rock; progressive rock
- Length: 53:51
- Label: Stickman
- Producer: Linda Dag

Elder chronology
Omens (2020)	Innate Passage (2022)	Through Zero (2026)

Innate Passage is the sixth full-length album by the Berlin-based American progressive metal band Elder. Following the release of the lead single "Endless Return", the album was released on November 25, 2022.

== Critical reception ==
Professional ratings
Review scores
Source	Rating
The Guardian	4/5 stars
Metal Injection	4.5/5 stars
Metal Storm	4/5 stars
Sputnikmusic	4/5 stars

Upon release, Innate Passage garnered positive reviews from metal and hard rock press. In a positive review from Metal Injection, Max Heilman wrote that "their music is distinct to a band who has spent the past 16 years expanding the boundaries of stoner rock, fleshing it out with psychedelia, flipping it upside down with progressive chops, and beautifying it with serene melodies."

== Track listing ==
Innate Passage track listing
No.	Title	Length
1.	"Catastasis"	10:50
2.	"Endless Return"	9:54
3.	"Coalescense"	9:47
4.	"Merged in Dreams – Ne Plus Ultra"	14:43
5.	"The Purpose"	8:37
Total length:		53:51

== Personnel ==
Elder

- Nick DiSalvo – guitar, vocals, keyboards
- Jack Donovan – bass
- Michael Risberg – guitar, keyboards
- Georg Edert – drums

Additional musicians

- Behrang Alavi – additional vocals on "Catastasis" and "Endless Return"
- Fabio Cuomo – additional keyboards on "The Purpose"

Production

- Linda Dag – recording and mixing
- Carl Saff – mastering
- Adrian Dexter – artwork
