= Baja Prog =

Mexicali prog-rock festival, 1997–2015

Baja Prog was an annual progressive rock festival in Mexicali, Baja California, Mexico, held from 1997—2015. The bill regularly featured a number of well-known bands in the genre, with an average of 1500 attendees each day.
