= Caligula's Horse =

Australian progressive metal band

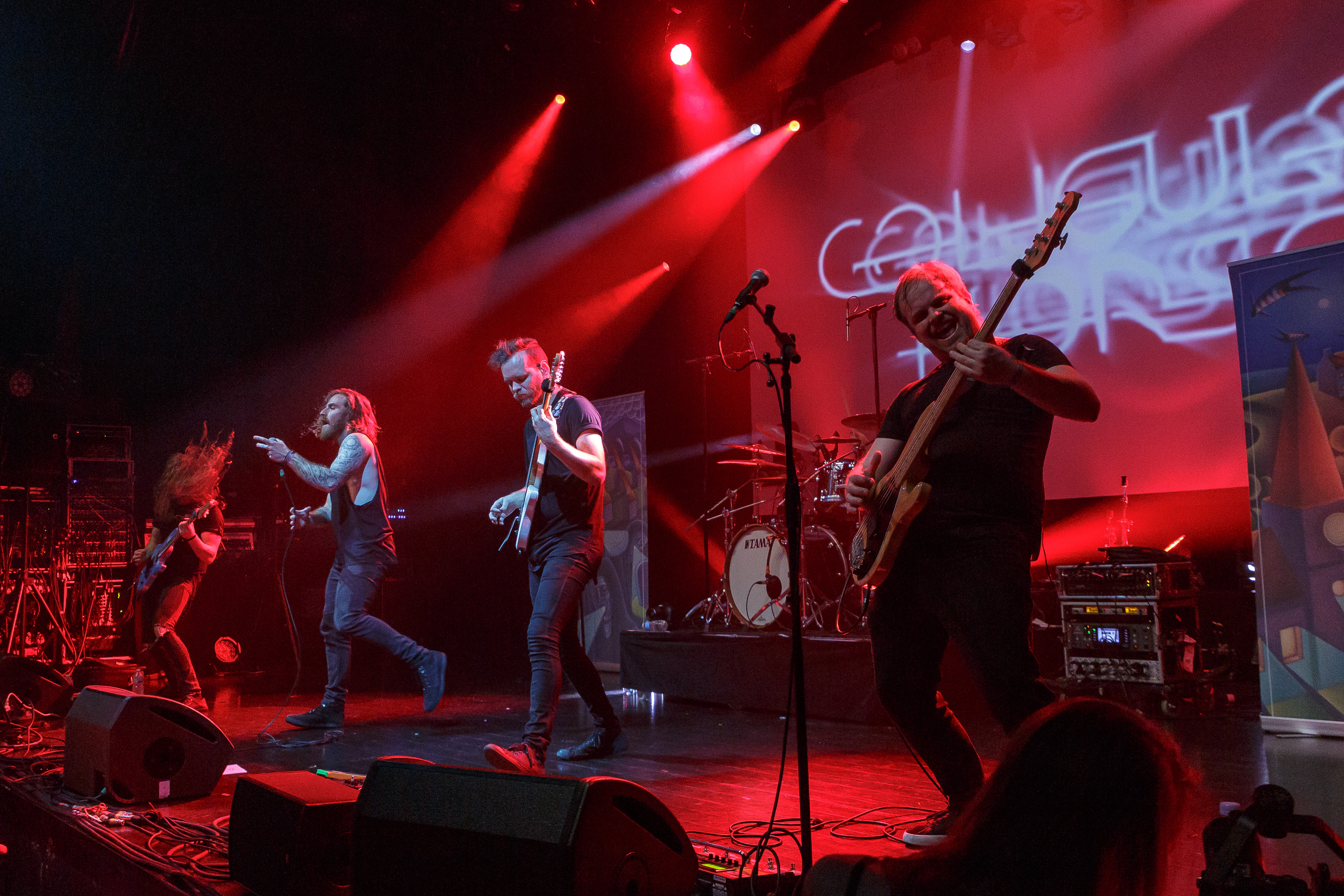
- The band live at the 2018 Very Prog Fest. From left to right: Adrian Goleby (former member), Jim Grey, Sam Vallen and Dave Couper (former member)

Background information
- Also known as: C-Horse
- Origin: Brisbane, Queensland, Australia
- Genres: Progressive metal; progressive rock
- Years active: 2011–present
- Labels: Welkin; Inside Out Music
- Members: Jim Grey; Sam Vallen; Josh Griffin; Dale Prinsse
- Past members: Geoff Irish; Zac Greensill; Dave Couper; Adrian Goleby
- Website: caligulashorse.com

Caligula's Horse is an Australian progressive metal band from Brisbane, Queensland. The band was formed by Sam Vallen and Jim Grey in early 2011. The current lineup consists of lead vocalist Jim Grey, lead guitarist Sam Vallen, bassist Dale Prinsse and drummer Josh Griffin. Caligula's Horse achieved their first chart success with their 2015 album release Bloom, with it reaching number 16 on the Australian Albums ARIA Chart and number 75 on the overall album chart. The album also reached number 73 on the Australian iTunes chart on 21 October 2015.

Their first album, Moments from Ephemeral City (2011), and a follow-up EP, Colossus (2011), were released independently before signing with Welkin Records and releasing their second album, The Tide, the Thief & River's End (2013). The band then signed with Inside Out Music for the release of their third album, Bloom (2015), their fourth album In Contact (2017), and their fifth album Rise Radiant (2020). Their most recent album, Charcoal Grace, was released on 26 January 2024.

== History ==
=== Formation, Moments from Ephemeral City and Colossus (2011) ===
In early 2011, Caligula's Horse was formed by Sam Vallen and Jim Grey. The band is named after the prized possession, Incitatus, of Roman Emperor Caligula by Grey, who was studying ancient history and classical languages at university. Initially Caligula's Horse consisted of only Grey on vocals and Vallen playing multiple instruments. Their debut album Moments from Ephemeral City was independently released on 2 April 2011. Vallen is credited with the songwriting, guitars, production, audio engineering, mixing and mastering. The band initially could not decide whether to continue or not, but after the online response for their album they decided they should expand their lineup for live shows. The lineup expanded to include Zac Greensill, Geoff Irish and Dave Couper. To showcase their new lineup a two-track EP Colossus was released in September 2011.

=== The Tide, the Thief & River's End (2012–2014) ===
In mid 2012, the band entered the studio to commence their follow-up LP. Their second studio album, The Tide, the Thief & River's End, was released 13 October 2013 through Welkin Records. This was a concept album with each track listed in a chronological order to tell a story that refers to the uprising of rebels, called "The Tide", within the city of "River's End", and a journey of oppressed people finding a safe haven that has unfortunate similarities between the old and new city. "The Thief" is the only character who remains in the story from start to finish.

The band undertook an intense touring schedule within Australia after the release of the album, and became known for their energetic live show and stage presence. The band was part of Progfest Sydney 2013 and Progfest Melbourne 2014. They toured with bands Opeth, Mastodon, The Dillinger Escape Plan, Protest the Hero, The Ocean, Firewind, Twelve Foot Ninja, and Ne Obliviscaris.

=== Bloom (2015–2016) ===
After their second album they gained the interest of the recording label, Inside Out Music, and signed on to release their third album through them. Prior to the release of the album the band toured around Australia with Tesseract and played a mix of crowd favourites and yet-to-be-released songs. Their third album, Bloom, was released 16 October 2015 and in its debut week on the ARIA charts it reached number 16 on the Australian band's chart and 75 on the overall chart. It peaked at 73 on the iTunes Australian charts in its first week. The album cover was designed by Chris Stevenson-Mangos who was given the aim of creating "something colourful and vibrant, somewhat circular in design (no hard edges) but perhaps suggesting stained-glass, and showing lots of nature imagery".

An official music video was released for "Firelight" off the Bloom album.

Caligula's Horse began their first European tour with Shining in October and November 2015.

Sam Vallen and Zac Greensill were nominated on Total Guitar reader's poll for the best prog rock guitarist of 2015.

On 30 May 2016, it was announced that Geoff Irish had left the band. On 10 August 2016, Josh Griffin was announced as Irish's replacement. On 28 January 2017, rhythm guitarist Zac Greensill announced his departure to focus on his side project, Opus of a Machine. He was replaced by Adrian Goleby, who had played bass in Arcane, Jim Grey's first band.

=== In Contact (2017–2019) ===
On 4 August 2017, the song "Will's Song (Let the Colours Run)" was released along with its music video on 23 August, as a tease to their new album.

On 15 September 2017, the band published In Contact, the first featuring Adrian Goleby and Josh Griffin. In Contact received a positive review on Angry Metal Guy.

On 10 December 2018, Dave Couper announced his departure from the band, mainly for health and financial reasons, as well as other musical aspirations. On 5 March 2019, Dale Prinsse was announced as the new bassist. He was already known for having formerly being called "C-Horse's sixth member", helping them with the mixing and production of their albums, and for playing bass in Opus of a Machine.

In September 2019, the band played their first four concerts in the Americas.

=== Rise Radiant (2020–2023) ===
On 22 May 2020, the band released their fifth album Rise Radiant. This was preceded by the release of three singles from the album: "The Tempest", "Slow Violence", and "Valkyrie".

On 6 July 2021, the departure of Adrian Goleby was announced, the guitarist citing a will to "journey to the next stage of [his] experience of life". The band thanked him dearly for his contributions, declaring that they would not be seeking out for another guitarist for the time, with the band remaining a four-piece.

In April and May 2022, Greensill returned to the band as a guest musician during their Australian tour in support of Rise Radiant, which had been postponed until then due to the COVID-19 pandemic.

=== Charcoal Grace (2023–present) ===
On 10 November 2023, the band released the first single titled "Golem" and announced that their sixth studio album, Charcoal Grace, would be released on 26 January 2024. On 7 December, the band unveiled the second single "The World Breathes with Me". On 11 January 2024, two weeks before the album release, the band premiered the third single "The Stormchaser" along with a music video.

The band went touring in North America throughout all February 2024 following the release of the album. They subsequently toured in Europe in May and June and were featured in two European festivals early October that same year.

== Musical style and influences ==
The band's music has been described as progressive rock and progressive metal.

Lead guitarist and composer Sam Vallen cites Steely Dan as an influence, frequently using the American band's signature add2 or "mu" chords for his compositions.

== Band members ==
Current members

- Jim Grey – lead vocals (2011–present)
- Sam Vallen – lead guitar (2011–present); rhythm guitar (2011, 2021–present)
- Josh Griffin – drums (2016–present)
- Dale Prinsse – bass (2019–present)

Past members

- Geoff Irish – drums (2011–2016)
- Zac Greensill – rhythm guitar, backing vocals (2011–2017; guest in the early 2022 tour)
- Dave Couper – bass, backing vocals (2011–2018)
- Adrian Goleby – rhythm guitar (2017–2021)

== Discography ==
=== Studio albums ===
Title	Details	Peak chart positions		
Title	Details	AUS	GER	SWI
Moments from Ephemeral City	Released: 2 April 2011; Label: Caligula's Horse; Format: CD, digital download	—	—	—
The Tide, the Thief & River's End	Released: 4 October 2013; Label: Welkin (WELKIN003); Format: CD, digital download	—	—	—
Bloom	Released: 16 October 2015; Label: Inside Out Music (IOMLP 434); Format: CD, digital download, LP	—	—	—
In Contact	Released: 15 September 2017; Label: Inside Out Music (IOMLP 488); Format: CD, digital download, LP	50	—	—
Rise Radiant	Released: 20 May 2020; Label: Inside Out Music (IOMLP 547); Format: CD, digital download, LP	23	43	25
Charcoal Grace	Released: 26 January 2024; Label: Inside Out Music; Format: CD, digital download, LP	— (Note: Charcoal Grace did not enter the ARIA Albums Chart, but peaked at number five on the ARIA Vinyl Albums Chart.)	—	39

=== Extended plays ===
Title	Details
Colossus	Released: 2011; Label: Caligula's Horse; Format: CD, digital download

== Awards ==
=== Queensland Music Awards ===
Year	Nominee / work	Award	Result (wins only)
2016	"Marigold"	Heavy Song of the Year	Won
