= Charcoal Grace =

Studio album by Caligula's Horse
- Released: 26 January 2024
- Genre: Progressive metal; progressive rock
- Length: 61:57
- Label: Inside Out Music
- Producer: Sam Vallen

Caligula's Horse chronology
Rise Radiant (2020)	Charcoal Grace (2024)

Singles from Charcoal Grace
- 1. "Golem" Released: 10 November 2023; 2. "The World Breathes with Me" Released: 7 December 2023; 3. "The Stormchaser" Released: 11 January 2024

Charcoal Grace is the sixth studio album by Australian progressive metal band Caligula's Horse. It was released on 26 January 2024 through Inside Out Music and was produced by Sam Vallen, the band's guitarist.

== Background and promotion ==
On 10 November 2023, the band released the first single titled "Golem" and announced the album itself and release date, whilst also revealing the album cover and the track list. On 7 December, the band unveiled the second single "The World Breathes with Me". On 11 January 2024, two weeks before the album release, the band premiered the third single "The Stormchaser" along with a music video.

== Critical reception ==
Professional ratings
Review scores
Source	Rating
Distorted Sound	10/10
Metal Storm	8.2/10

The album received positive reviews from critics. Alex Mace of Distorted Sound scored the album 10 out of 10 and called the album "inventive, united, heartbreaking, blood-pumping [and] inspired".

== Track listing ==
Adapted from Apple Music.

Charcoal Grace track listing
No.	Title	Writer(s)	Length
1.	"The World Breathes with Me"	Jim Grey, Josh Griffin, Dale Prinsse, Sam Vallen	10:00
2.	"Golem"	Grey, Griffin, Vallen	5:20
3.	"Charcoal Grace I: Prey"	Grey, Prinsse, Vallen	7:47
4.	"Charcoal Grace II: A World Without"	Grey, Griffin, Prinsse, Vallen	6:47
5.	"Charcoal Grace III: Vigil"	Grey, Vallen	3:22
6.	"Charcoal Grace IV: Give Me Hell"	Grey, Griffin, Vallen	6:13
7.	"Sails"	Grey, Vallen	4:31
8.	"The Stormchaser"	Grey, Prinsse, Vallen	5:57
9.	"Mute"	Grey, Vallen	12:00
Total length:			61:57

== Personnel ==
Caligula's Horse

- Jim Grey – vocals
- Sam Vallen – guitars, production, engineering, mixing, arranging
- Dale Prinsse – bass, engineering, photography
- Josh Griffin – drums

Additional musicians

- Kate Derepas – cello
- Sophie Willis – flute, clarinet
- Victoria Taylor – trumpet
- Samuel Andrews – violin

Additional personnel

- Jared Adlam – engineering
- Forrester Savell – mastering
- Chris Stevenson-Mangos – layout, design
- Chris Panatier – artwork

== Charts ==
Chart performance for Charcoal Grace
Chart (2024)	Peak position
Australian Vinyl Albums (ARIA)	5
Swiss Albums (Schweizer Hitparade)	39
UK Album Downloads (OCC)	41
UK Rock & Metal Albums (OCC)	16
