= Oceans of Slumber =

American heavy metal band

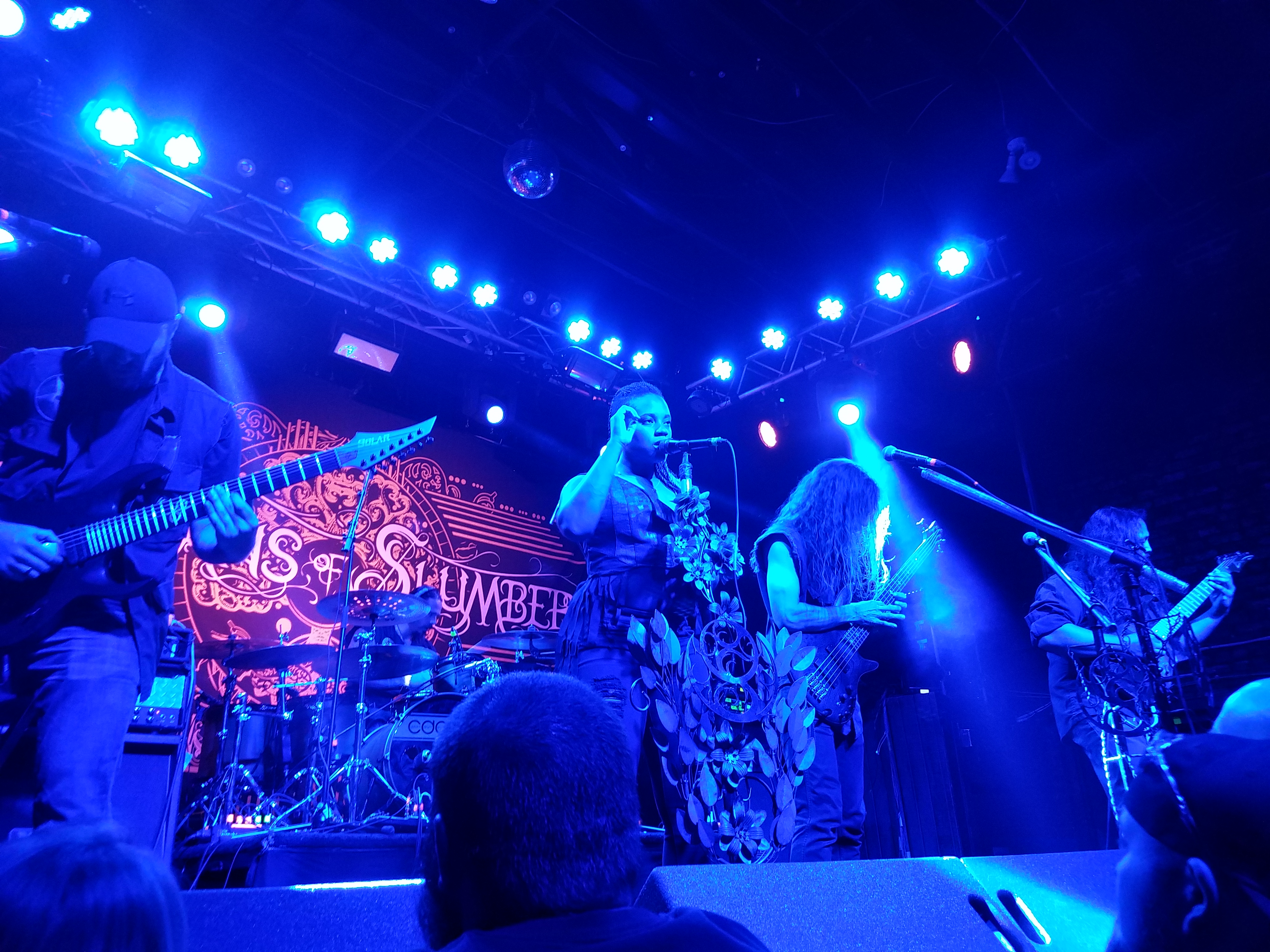
- Oceans of Slumber performing at Trees Dallas 2018

Background information
- Origin: Houston, Texas, U.S.
- Genres: Gothic metal; progressive metal; doom metal; melodic death metal
- Years active: 2011–present
- Labels: Century Media Records (2015-2022); Season of Mist (2023-ongoing)
- Members: Dobber Beverly; Cammie Gilbert-Beverly; Semir Özerkan; Alex Davis; Chris Kritikos
- Past members: Ronnie Allen; Uaeb Yelsaeb; Sean Gary; Anthony Contreras; Keegan Kelly; Mat V. Aleman; Jessie Santos; Alexander Lucian; Chris Jones
- Website: oceansofslumber.com

Oceans of Slumber is an American heavy metal band from Houston, Texas, formed in 2011.

== History ==
Their self-released debut album Aetherial was released in February 2013.

Lead vocalist Cammie Gilbert joined the band in 2014, after previous vocalist Ronnie Gates left. Gilbert became the primary lyrics writer for the group after joining.

In 2015, the band signed with Century Media Records. In 2016, they toured with Ne Obliviscaris and Enslaved on a 34 date European tour.

In March 2016, they released their second album, Winter, which received positive reviews from The Houston Press and Metal Injection.

On December 17, 2017, they released the lead single "The Decay of Disregard" off of their upcoming album The Banished Heart. The second single was "The Banished Heart". The third single "No Color, No Light" in February 2018, featuring Tom S. Englund from Evergrey. The album was released on March 3, 2018. The album was included on the list of "50 Best albums of 2018 So Far" by Metal Hammer. The band has been called a "female fronted Opeth" by Noisey. In 2018, the band toured with Insomnium. In 2019, they joined Swallow the Sun as support for their European tour.

== Members ==
Current members

- Dobber Beverly – drums, piano (2011–present)
- Cammie Gilbert-Beverly – lead vocals (2014–present)
- Semir Ozerkan – bass, backing vocals (2019–present)
- Alex Davis – lead guitar (2023–present)
- Chris Kritikos – rhythm guitar, keyboards (2023–present)

Previous members

- Ronnie Gates – lead vocals (2011–2014)
- Beau Beasley – keyboards (2015)
- Anthony Contreras – lead guitar, backing vocals (2011–2018)
- Sean Gary – rhythm guitar, harsh vocals (2011–2018)
- Keegan Kelly – bass, backing vocals (2011–2019)
- Mat V. Aleman – keyboards (2014–2022)
- Alexander Lucian – rhythm guitar, backing vocals (2019–2022)
- Jessie Santos – lead guitar (2019–2023)
- Chris Jones – guitars (2023)

Timeline

== Discography ==
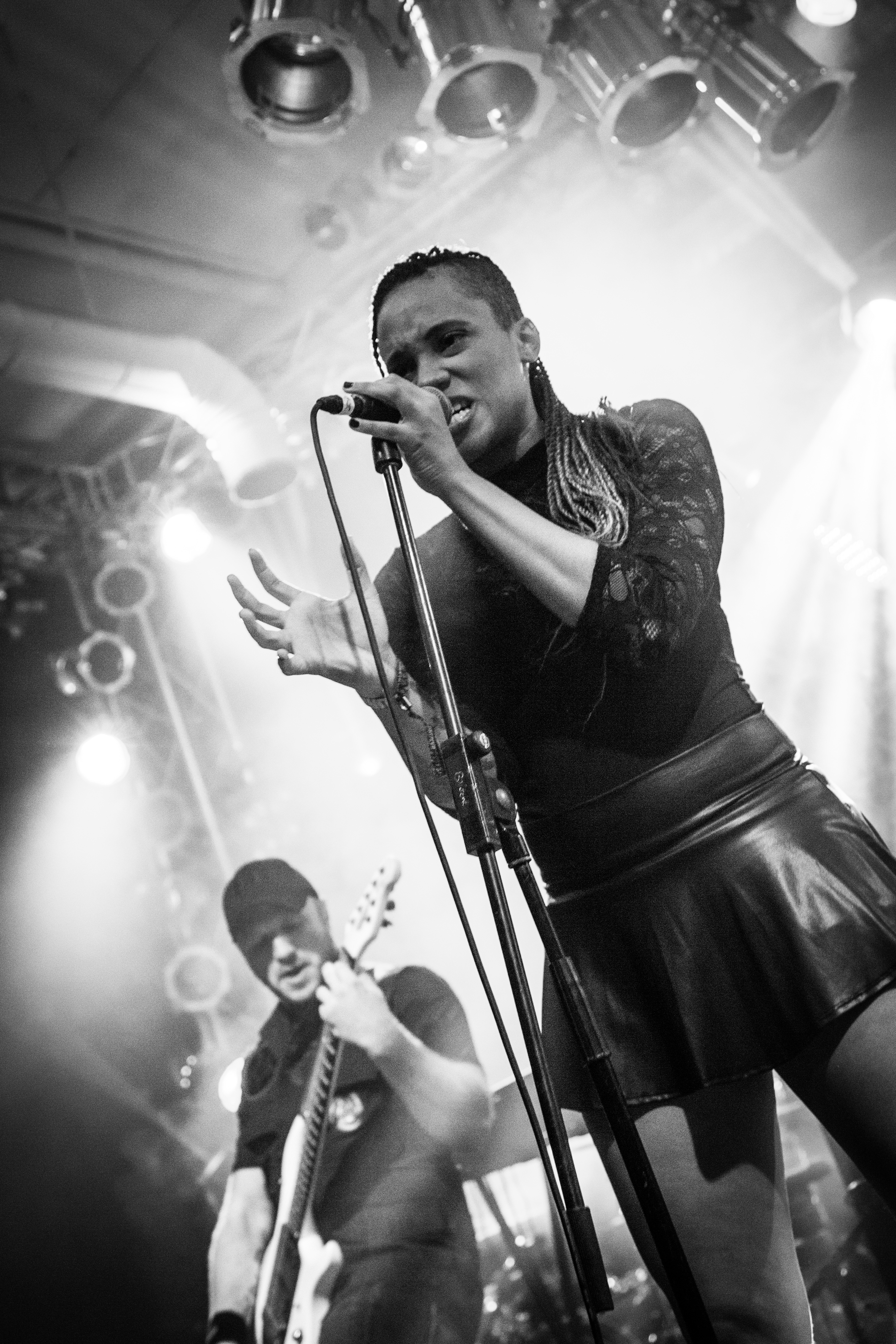
Oceans of Slumber in 2016

Studio albums

- Aetherial (2013)
- Winter (2016)
- The Banished Heart (2018)
- Oceans of Slumber (2020)
- Starlight and Ash (2022)
- Where Gods Fear to Speak (2024)

EPs

- Blue (2015)
