= Colossus class =

Colossus class may refer to:

- Colossus-class battleship (1882), a Royal Navy ship class of two second-class battleships launched in 1882
- Colossus-class battleship (1910), a Royal Navy ship class of two battleships launched in 1910 and operating during World War I
- Colossus-class aircraft carrier, the Royal Navy ship class of the first eight 1942 Design Light Fleet Carrier (aircraft carriers) launched during the mid-1940s
