= Colossus Bridge =

Colossus Bridge may refer to:

- Colossus Bridge (Philadelphia), a former bridge across the Schuylkill River near Philadelphia
- Colossus Bridge (video game), a 1986 card video game
