= The Tide, the Thief & River's End =

Studio album by Caligula's Horse
- Released: 4 October 2013
- Recorded: April 2012–March 2013
- Studios: Heaven's Gate Studio, Brisbane
- Genres: Progressive metal; progressive rock
- Length: 50:17
- Label: Welkin Records
- Producer: Sam Vallen

Caligula's Horse chronology
Colossus (2011)	The Tide, the Thief & River's End (2013)	Bloom (2015)

Singles from The Tide, the Thief & River's End
- 1. "Dark Hair Down" Released: 22 September 2013

The Tide, the Thief & River's End is the second studio album by Australian progressive metal band Caligula's Horse. It was released through Welkin Records on 4 October 2013. The album was recorded by Sam Vallen, Dale Prinsse and Zac Greensill at Heaven's Gate Studios in Brisbane. The album was produced by guitarist Sam Vallen.

== Background ==
In September 2013, it was announced that the band had signed with Welkin Entertainment. Their upcoming sophomore album was reported to be titled The Tide, the Thief & River's End. To coincide with the news the single "Dark Hair Down" premiered along with a music video. The album's progression was chronicled in a series of video diaries that were uploaded to YouTube periodically throughout the recording process between April 2012 and March 2013. Collectively, the videos feature various clips of the band writing, rehearsing, travelling, attending photo shoots and performing live including versions of the songs from "the rough stuff" to the final studio product interspersed with short interviews and interplay between members.

== Composition ==
Vocalist Jim Grey described the album as a "concept [album]… we built the world around". In an interview with Matthew Evans of The AU Review Grey spoke on the general narrative of the album saying that it is "based around two cities" and tells the story "of the journey of a group of people escaping oppression, and seeking a new home free from tyranny." Grey also stated that "the concept and story itself is never explicitly told. There is room for interpretation", in that "the text between the tracks ties it all together".

== Track listing ==
Lyrics and music by Grey and Vallen. Additional music and lyric contributions by Greensill on track 6.

No.	Title	Length
1.	"A Gift to Afterthought"	6:17
2.	"Water's Edge"	7:39
3.	"Atlas"	5:02
4.	"Into the White"	8:19
5.	"Old Cracks in New Earth" (instrumental with vocal outro)	6:30
6.	"Dark Hair Down"	6:03
7.	"Thief"	2:09
8.	"All Is Quiet by the Wall"	8:18
Total length:		50:17

== Personnel ==
Caligula's Horse

- Jim Grey – lead vocals
- Sam Vallen – lead guitar, backing vocals, production, engineering, mixing
- Zac Greensill – rhythm guitar, backing vocals, engineering assistance
- Dave Couper – bass, backing vocals
- Geoff Irish – drums, backing vocals

Additional musicians

- Holly Terrens – flute on "Into the White"
- Michelle Wilson – violin on "Water's Edge"
- Natasha Ivanovic – violin on "Old Cracks in New Earth"
- Stefanie Bernard – clarinet on "Water's Edge" and "Into the White"
- Sean Thomas – electric piano on "All Is Quiet by the Wall"
- Boy Potts, Dario Lagana, John Grey, Lucas Stone, Mitchell Legg, Sam Grey, Sean Thomas – various backing vocals

Additional personnel

- Dale Prinsse – engineering assistance
- Dave Collins – mastering
- Kelly Meyer – artwork
- Stephanie Bernard – photography
