= Colossus (EP) =

EP by Caligula's Horse
- Released: September 2011
- Recorded: 2011
- Genre: Progressive metal; progressive rock
- Length: 10:54
- Label: Self-released
- Producer: Sam Vallen

Caligula's Horse chronology
Moments from Ephemeral City (2011)	Colossus (2011)	The Tide, the Thief & River's End (2013)

Colossus is the first EP by Australian progressive metal band Caligula's Horse. It was released independently in September 2011 to showcase their recently expanded lineup after the positive online response for their debut album Moments from Ephemeral City, which was originally intended to be a one-off project between vocalist Jim Grey and guitarist Sam Vallen.

== Track listing ==
Lyrics and music by Vallen and Grey.

No.	Title	Length
1.	"Colossus"	5:41
2.	"Vanishing Rites (Tread Softly Little One)"	5:13
Total length:		10:54

== Personnel ==
Caligula's Horse

- Jim Grey – lead vocals
- Sam Vallen – lead guitar, production, mixing, mastering, engineering
- Zac Greensill – rhythm guitar, backing vocals
- Dave Couper – bass, backing vocals
- Geoff Irish – drums
