= Elder (band) =

American rock band

- Origin: Massachusetts, U.S.
- Genres: Stoner metal; doom metal; psychedelic rock; progressive metal; progressive rock; sludge metal (early)
- Years active: 2006–present
- Labels: MeteorCity; Armageddon; Stickman Records; Blues Funeral
- Members: Nick DiSalvo; Jack Donovan; Mike Risberg; Georg Edert
- Past members: Chas Mitchell; Matthew Couto
- Website: beholdtheelder.com

Elder is an American rock band from Massachusetts, consisting of frontman and lead guitarist Nick DiSalvo, bassist Jack Donovan, guitarist/keyboardist Michael Risberg and drummer Georg Edert. They have released seven full-length albums since 2006, as well as multiple demos and EPs. Elder is now based in Berlin, Germany.

== History ==
Elder was formed in New Bedford, Massachusetts in 2006 by Nick DiSalvo (guitars, vocals), Chas Mitchell (bass), and Matt Couto (drums). Mike Risberg joined the band on guitars and keyboards in 2017. Co-founding member and drummer Matt Couto left the band in 2019 and was replaced by Georg Edert.

Elder released their debut eponymous LP in 2008. The album incorporates a mixture of doom metal and stoner rock elements throughout, while mainly consisting of doom metal and some low-pitched strained vocals on such songs as "Riddle of Steel Pt. 1" similar to Sleep's album Dopesmoker.

Elder's second album Dead Roots Stirring was released on October 25, 2011.

A live album Live at Roadburn was released on November 15, 2013, consisting of six tracks from their previously released material.

In 2015, the band signed with Stickman Records

Third album Lore was released on February 27, 2015. This album featured elements reminiscent of progressive rock, as opposed to the more straight stoner rock/metal sound heard on earlier albums.

Fourth album Reflections of a Floating World was released on June 2, 2017. Rolling Stone magazine rated it fifth on its list of the top metal albums for 2017.

On December 3, 2021, Elder released a collaborative album Eldovar – A Story of Darkness & Light with the German psychedelic rock band Kadavar. The collaboration was the result of tours being cancelled due to the COVID-19 pandemic and both bands residing in Berlin.

Innate Passage was released on November 25, 2022. The sixth full-length studio release from Elder, the album builds upon the progressive rock elements of their previous studio album, Omens, while finding new ways to improve upon their ever-evolving sound and structure.

Through Zero, Elder's seventh studio album, was released on May 29, 2026. The album was recorded between tours and in sessions across much of winter 2025–26 at Big Snuff Studio in Berlin, with longtime collaborator Richard Behrens and additional keyboard contributions from Fabien de Menou. Described by the band as their longest studio production to date, the record contains nearly an hour of material. Artwork was created by Adam Hill, with band photography by Leon de Backer. The album was released in Europe via Stickman Records, in North America via Blues Funeral, and in Australia via Bird's Robe.

== Musical style ==
The band's mix of doom, stoner, psychedelic, and progressive styles is also referred to as "heavy psych". The songs are often longer than usual, some lasting more than 10 minutes. The music is carried by the pentatonic scale characteristic of stoner and doom, as well as heavy grooves, and makes accentuated use of melodic guitar playing. Nick DiSalvo, the main songwriter, counts bands such as Colour Haze and Dungen among his main influences. DiSalvo commented on Elder's preference for long playing times by saying that he needed time to develop his musical ideas and had no talent for writing short songs.

== Members ==
Current

- Nick DiSalvo – vocals, lead guitar, songwriting (2006–present)
- Jack Donovan – bass, backing vocals (2008–present)
- Mike Risberg – guitar, keyboards (2017–present)
- Georg Edert – drums (2019–present)

Touring members

- Fabien de Menou – keyboards, backing vocals (2026-present)

Former

- Matt Couto – drums (2006–2019)
- Chas Mitchell – bass (2006–2007)

== Discography ==
=== Studio albums ===
- Elder (2008)
- Dead Roots Stirring (2011)
- Lore (2015)
- Reflections of a Floating World (2017)
- Omens (2020)
- Innate Passage (2022)
- Through Zero (2026)

=== Collaborative albums ===
- Eldovar – A Story of Darkness & Light (with Kadavar) (2021)

=== EPs ===
- Double EP (split with Queen Elephantine) (2006)
- Elder Demo (demo album) (2007)
- Demos & Live (demo album) (2012)
- Spires Burn / Release (2012)
- The Gold & Silver Sessions (2019)
- In Procession / Halcyon (live session) (2021)
- Liminality / Dream State Return (2025)

=== Live ===
- Elder: Live at Roadburn (2013)
- Live at BBC Maida Vale Studios (2024)
