= Rise Radiant =

Studio album by Caligula's Horse
- Released: 22 May 2020
- Studio: Studio Circuit, Burleigh Heads, Queensland; Machine Lab Recording, Gold Coast, Queensland
- Genre: Progressive metal; progressive rock
- Length: 47:46
- Label: Inside Out Music
- Producer: Sam Vallen

Caligula's Horse chronology
In Contact (2017)	Rise Radiant (2020)	Charcoal Grace (2024)

Singles from Rise Radiant
- 1. "The Tempest" Released: 12 March 2020; 2. "Slow Violence" Released: 10 April 2020; 3. "Valkyrie" Released: 8 May 2020

Rise Radiant is the fifth studio album by Australian progressive metal band Caligula's Horse, released through Inside Out Music on 10 May 2020. It is the first album to feature bassist Dale Prinsse, who joined the band in 2019.

== Track listing ==
No.	Title	Writer(s)	Length
1.	"The Tempest"	Vallen, Grey, Prinsse	4:48
2.	"Slow Violence"	Vallen, Grey	4:30
3.	"Salt"	Vallen, Grey, Goleby	7:41
4.	"Resonate"	Vallen, Grey	2:37
5.	"Oceanrise"	Vallen, Grey, Griffin	4:34
6.	"Valkyrie"	Vallen, Grey	5:09
7.	"Autumn"	Vallen, Grey	7:44
8.	"The Ascent"	Vallen, Grey	10:43
Total length:			47:46

Digital release bonus track
No.	Title	Writer(s)	Length
9.	"Don't Give Up" (Peter Gabriel cover)	Peter Gabriel	5:10
10.	"Message to My Girl" (Split Enz cover)	Neil Finn	3:54
Total length:			56:50

== Personnel ==
Production credits taken from album liner notes.

Caligula's Horse

- Jim Grey – vocals
- Sam Vallen – lead guitar, production, engineering
- Adrian Goleby – rhythm guitar
- Dale Prinsse – bass, additional engineering
- Josh Griffin – drums

Additional personnel

- Jens Bogren – mixing, mastering
- Jared Adlam – engineering
- Rory Cavanagh – additional engineering
- Chris Stevenson-Mangos – artwork, design

== Charts ==
Chart performance for Rise Radiant
Chart (2020)	Peak position
Australian Albums (ARIA)	23
German Albums (Offizielle Top 100)	43
Scottish Albums (OCC)	100
Swiss Albums (Schweizer Hitparade)	25
