= Serge Brussolo =

French fiction author

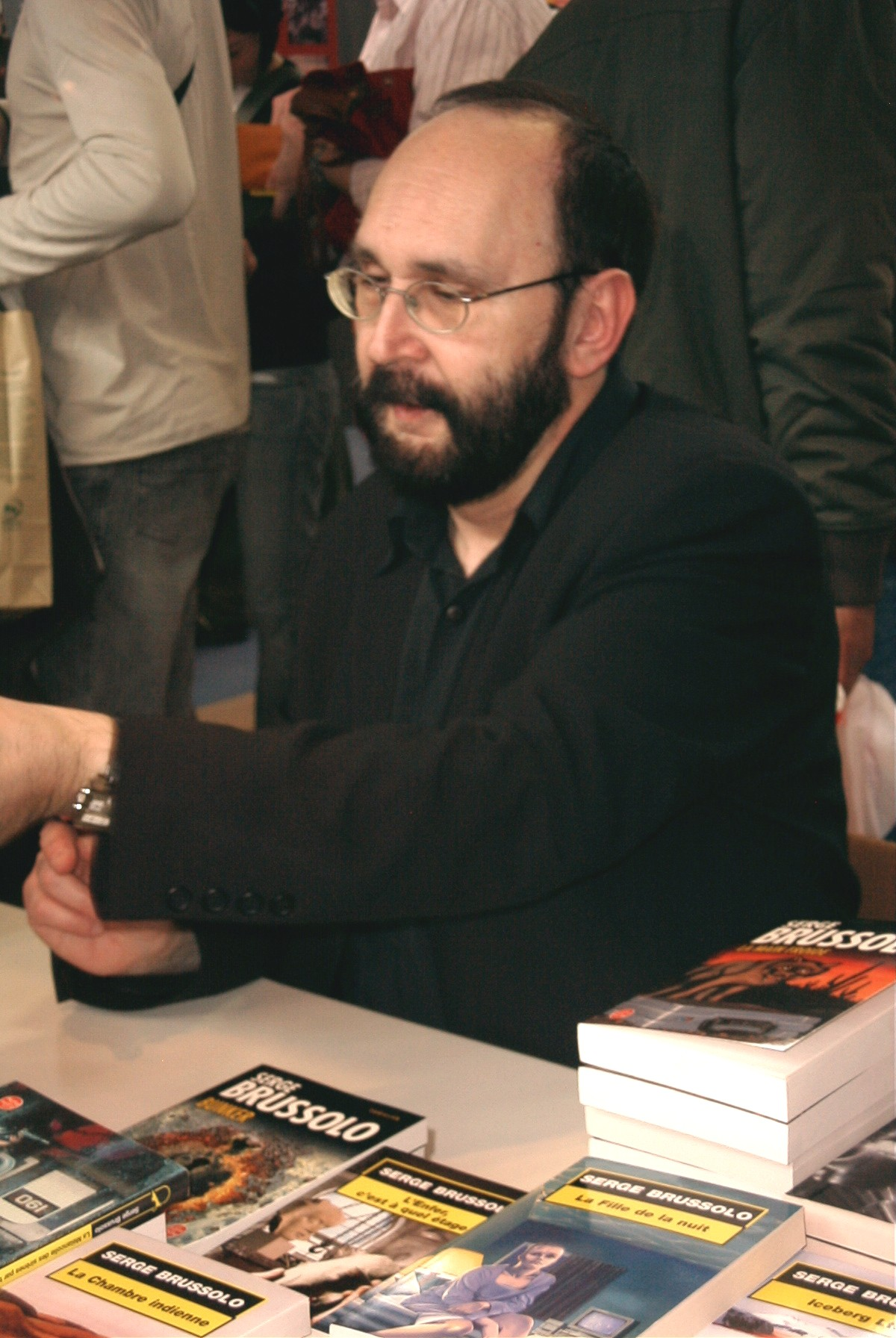
Serge Brussolo

Serge Brussolo (born 31 May 1951) is a French fiction author.

== Biography ==
Born in Paris, Brussolo had a tormented childhood. He studied letters and psychology and wrote his first texts very early, finding inspiration in his misery and disturbed family environment. The blackness of his first novels set the tone for all of his future work.

At the beginning of his career, publishers rejected him because of his style – which, although close to fantasy and science fiction cannot easily be categorised under any genre. He persevered because he could not consider a future without writing. His work was first published in fanzines. His first published text was The Escaped Prisoner published in 1972 in The Wedged Paddle. This was followed by a great number of novels published in the Anticipation and Presence of the future series. Another of his works, Les semeurs d'abîmes, won the Prix Tour-Apollo Award in 1984.

His 1992 science fiction novel was translated into English in 2016 entitled The Deep Sea Diver's Syndrome.

Later he gave up science fiction in favour of other narrative forms, in particular the thriller and the historical novel. His first thriller, The Vermin, contained all of the ingredients of his later suspense novels. In his thrillers he denounces the problems of society, in particular that of the United States. To maintain his creative freedom Brussolo works with several publishers whom he puts in competition with one another, relying on the high sales figures his books achieve. He has also published under the pseudonyms Kitty Doom, D. Morlok, Akira Suzuko and Zeb Chillicothe.

== Film adaptations ==
In 2003, his novel A l'image du dragon was freely adapted into an animated motion picture, The Rain Children, by Philippe Leclerc. In 2009, his best-selling novel Les Emmurés was adapted into an English-language film entitled Walled In.
