= Moments from Ephemeral City =

Studio album by Caligula's Horse
- Released: 2 April 2011
- Recorded: 2010–2011
- Studio: Multiple improvised studios in the Gold Coast and Brisbane
- Genre: Progressive metal; progressive rock
- Length: 42:37
- Label: Self-released
- Producer: Sam Vallen

Caligula's Horse chronology
Moments from Ephemeral City (2011)	Colossus (2011)

Moments from Ephemeral City is the debut studio album by Australian progressive metal band Caligula's Horse. The album was released independently on 2 April 2011. The album was recorded from 2010 to 2011 in various makeshift studios around the Gold Coast and Brisbane and was produced, mixed, mastered and engineered by guitarist Sam Vallen.

== Track listing ==
Lyrics and music by Vallen. Additional music and lyric contributions by Grey on tracks 1, 8, and 9.

No.	Title	Length
1.	"The City Has No Empathy (Your Sentimental Lie)"	6:10
2.	"Silence"	7:13
3.	"Singularity" (instrumental)	3:33
4.	"Alone in the World"	11:04
5.	"Ephemera"	3:19
6.	"Equally Flawed"	6:09
7.	"Calliope's Son (Don't Ever Look Back)" (instrumental)	5:09
Total length:		42:37

Reissue Bonus Tracks from Colossus (EP)
No.	Title	Length
8.	"Colossus"	5:40
9.	"Vanishing Rites (Tread Softly Little One)"	5:12
Total length:		53:29

== Personnel ==
Caligula's Horse

- Jim Grey – lead vocals
- Sam Vallen – lead guitar, production, mixing, mastering, engineering, layout
- Zac Greensill – rhythm guitar, backing vocals
- Dave Couper – bass, backing vocals
- Geoff Irish – drums

Additional personnel

- Lemi Fleming – artwork
- Stephanie Bernard – photography
