= USS Colossus =

USS Colossus may refer to the following ships of the United States Navy:

- USS Colossus (1864), a steamer which served during the American Civil War
- USS Colossus (1869), a monitor, which was renamed from Kalamazoo on 15 June 1869
