= French ship Colosse =

Three vessels of the French Navy have borne the name Colosse ("Colossus"):

- Bizarre (1672), a 36-gun frigate, bore the name Colosse in her late career.
- Colosse (1813), a Téméraire-class ship of the line, bore the name before being razeed into the 60-gun frigate Pallas
- Friedland (1840), an Océan-class 118-gun ship of the line, bore the name Colosse when she was used as a barracks hulk.

== Notes and references ==
- Roche, Jean-Michel (2005). Dictionnaire des bâtiments de la flotte de guerre française de Colbert à nos jours, 1671 - 1870. Group Retozel-Maury Millau. pp. 120–121. ISBN 978-2-9525917-0-6. OCLC 165892922.
