= Decriannus =

Roman architect

Decriannus was the official architect of the Roman emperor Hadrian, who repaired the Egyptian city of Alexandria.
