= Slift =

French rock band

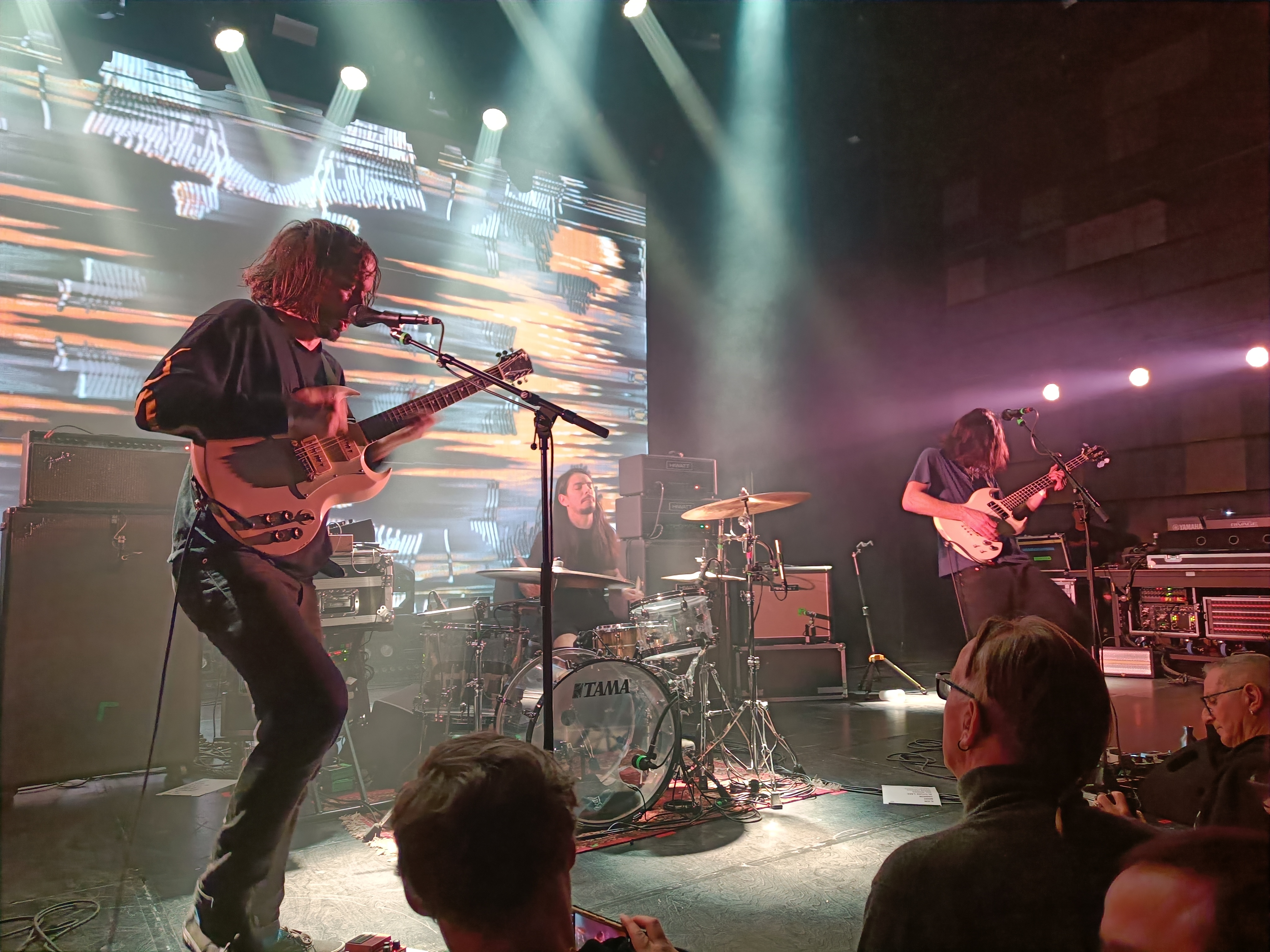
- Slift on stage in 2025.

Background information
- Origin: Toulouse, France
- Genres: Garage rock, hard rock, progressive rock, psychedelic rock, stoner rock, space rock, acid rock, heavy metal
- Years active: 2016–present
- Labels: Rough Trade, Sub Pop, Vicious Circle, Howlin' Banana, Stolen Body Records
- Members: Jean Fossat; Rémi Fossat; Canek Flores
- Website: sliftrock.com

Slift (stylised as SLIFT) is a French rock band from Toulouse. The band consists of brothers Jean (guitar, vocals, synthesizers) and Rémi Fossat (bass), and their high school friend Canek Flores (drums). Since forming in 2016, the band has released four albums, two EPs, and multiple live sessions, in addition to touring internationally in Europe and North America.

== History ==
=== 2016–2017: Early years and initial releases ===
Slift formed after brothers Jean and Rémi Fossat met drummer Canek Flores at a classical music school. The trio began performing together in various groups before forming Slift in 2016. Their debut EP, Space Is the Key, was released two years later and features a garage rock sound. In 2018, Slift released their debut album, La Planète Inexplorée, on Howlin Banana Records and Stolen Body Records.

=== 2020–present: Ummon and breakthrough success ===
On 28 February 2020, the band released their second studio album, Ummon, which was met with positive critical reviews. Released on Vicious Circle records and Stolen Body Records. The album showcases a stylistic transition towards a heavier, metal-inspired sound. The band was initially unable to tour in support of Ummon due to the onset of the COVID-19 pandemic and associated lockdowns. The band garnered international attention during the pandemic through widespread sharing of their debut KEXP session. In late 2022, the band embarked on their first North American tour, including performances at the Levitation and Desert Daze festivals. On 19 January 2024, Slift released their third studio album, Ilion, through Sub Pop Records.

On March 31, 2026, Slift released the first single, "A Storm Of Wings", from their upcoming fourth album Fantasia.

== Discography ==
=== Studio albums ===
- La Planète Inexplorée (2018)
- Ummon (2020)
- Ilion (2024)
- Fantasia (2026)

=== Extended plays ===
- Spacetrip for Everyone (2016)
- Space Is the Key (2017)

=== Live albums ===
- Levitation Sessions (2021)

=== Singles ===
- "The Sword" (2017)
- "Fearless Eye" (2018)
- "Ummon" (2019)
- "Hyperion" (2020)
- "Unseen" (2022)
- "Ilion" (2023)
- “Nimh” (2023)
- “Weavers’ Weft” (2024)

=== Music videos ===
- Dominator (2017)
- The Sword (2017)
- Fearless Eye (2018)
- Heavy Road (2018)
- Hyperion (2020)
- Altitude Lake (2020)
- Thousand Helmets of Gold (2021)
- Nimh (2024)
- Weaver’s Weft (2024)
- A Storm of Wings (2026)
- The Day of Execution (2026)
- Fantasia (2026)
