= Ostara (disambiguation) =

Ostara may refer to:

== Religion ==
- the Old High German word for "Easter", cognate to Anglo-Saxon Ēostre
- Spring Equinox (Ostara), the Neopagan and Wiccan festival celebrated around spring equinox
- Ostara (magazine), a 20th-century German occult and nationalist magazine

== Music ==
- Ostara (band), a British folk music band
- Ostara (album), an album by British band The Wishing Tree

== Other ==
- 343 Ostara, an asteroid
  - USS Ostara (1944–1946), an American Artemis-class attack cargo ship named after the asteroid
- Ostara Publishing, a British publisher
- Ostara Nutrient Recovery Technologies Inc., a Canadian company specializing in resource recovery from wastewater and sewage sludge treatment
- Ostara, a 20th-century Austrian monarchist organization created by Karl Burian
