= Lost Time =

Lost time is a concept in traffic engineering.

Lost Time may also refer to:

- Lost Time (12 Rods album), 2002
- Lost Time (Tacocat album), 2016

== See also ==
- In Search of Lost Time (French: À la recherche du temps perdu), a novel in seven volumes by Marcel Proust
- Time Lost, a 1997 album by Enchant
