= Thought Chamber =

American progressive metal supergroup

- Origin: San Francisco, Dallas, Atlanta
- Genres: Progressive metal
- Years active: 2006–present
- Labels: InsideOut
- Members: Travis Wills; Devon Graves; John Jaycee Cuijpers; Michael Harris; Mike Haid; Jeff Plant; Bill Jenkins
- Past members: Ted Leonard; Rob Stankiewicz; Derek Blakley; Bobby Williamson
- Website: Official myspace

Thought Chamber is an American progressive metal supergroup formed in 2006. The band was formed by guitarist Michael Harris and vocalist Ted Leonard of Enchant.

== History ==
The band's first full-length album, Angular Perceptions was released in 2007 on progressive label InsideOut and received critical acclaim, including Honorable Mention from drum legend Mike Portnoy in his Top 10 Albums of 2007. Thought Chamber released their second full-length opus, a concept album entitled Psykerion, in 2013 featuring founding members, guitarist Michael Harris and vocalist Ted Leonard, along with new drummer Mike Haid, bassist Jeff Plant, and keyboardist Bill Jenkins (Enchant). Progressive metal web site, Grande Rock, voted Psykerion "Best Album of 2013", and voted "Transcend" Best Song of 2013. In early 2014, Mike Portnoy invited Thought Chamber vocalist, Ted Leonard, to tour with his progressive band, Transatlantic, to fill in for Daniel Gildenlöw (Pain of Salvation) who was recovering from unexpected health issues. Ted also performed with Transatlantic, and Spock's Beard in Feb 2014 on the Progressive Nation at Sea Cruise. In March 2014, InsideOut Music released the first-ever Thought Chamber video, "Transcend" which was filmed in Dallas, TX in September 2013.

Thought Chamber has been invited to perform at the Sold Out ProgPower USA Festival in Atlanta in September 2014.

On August 22, 2025, they will release their third album, Myst of Lyriad, featuring a new trio of vocalists (Travis Wills, Devon Graves, John Jaycee Cuijpers) as Ted Leonard stepped down from the band.

== Members ==
- Travis Wills – vocals (Crimson Glory, Infidel Rising, Valorheart)
- Devon Graves – vocals (Psychotic Waltz)
- John Jaycee Cuijpers – vocals (Praying Mantis)
- Michael Harris – guitars, keyboards, vocals (Darkology, Arch Rival and Vitalij Kuprij)
- Mike Haid – drums (Michael Harris, David T. Chastain, Joe Stump)
- Jeff Plant – bass (Jimi Tunnell's Trilateral Commission)
- Bill Jenkins – keyboards (Enchant)

== Past members ==
- Ted Leonard – vocals (Spock's Beard, Enchant)
- Derek Blakley – bass (Haji's Kitchen, Michael Harris)
- Rob Stankiewicz – drums (Haji's Kitchen, Michael Harris)
- Bobby Williamson – keyboards (Eumeria, Outworld)

== Discography ==
- Angular Perceptions – album, 2007
- Psykerion – album, 2013
- Myst of Lyriad – album, 2025
