= Ēostre =

Germanic goddess

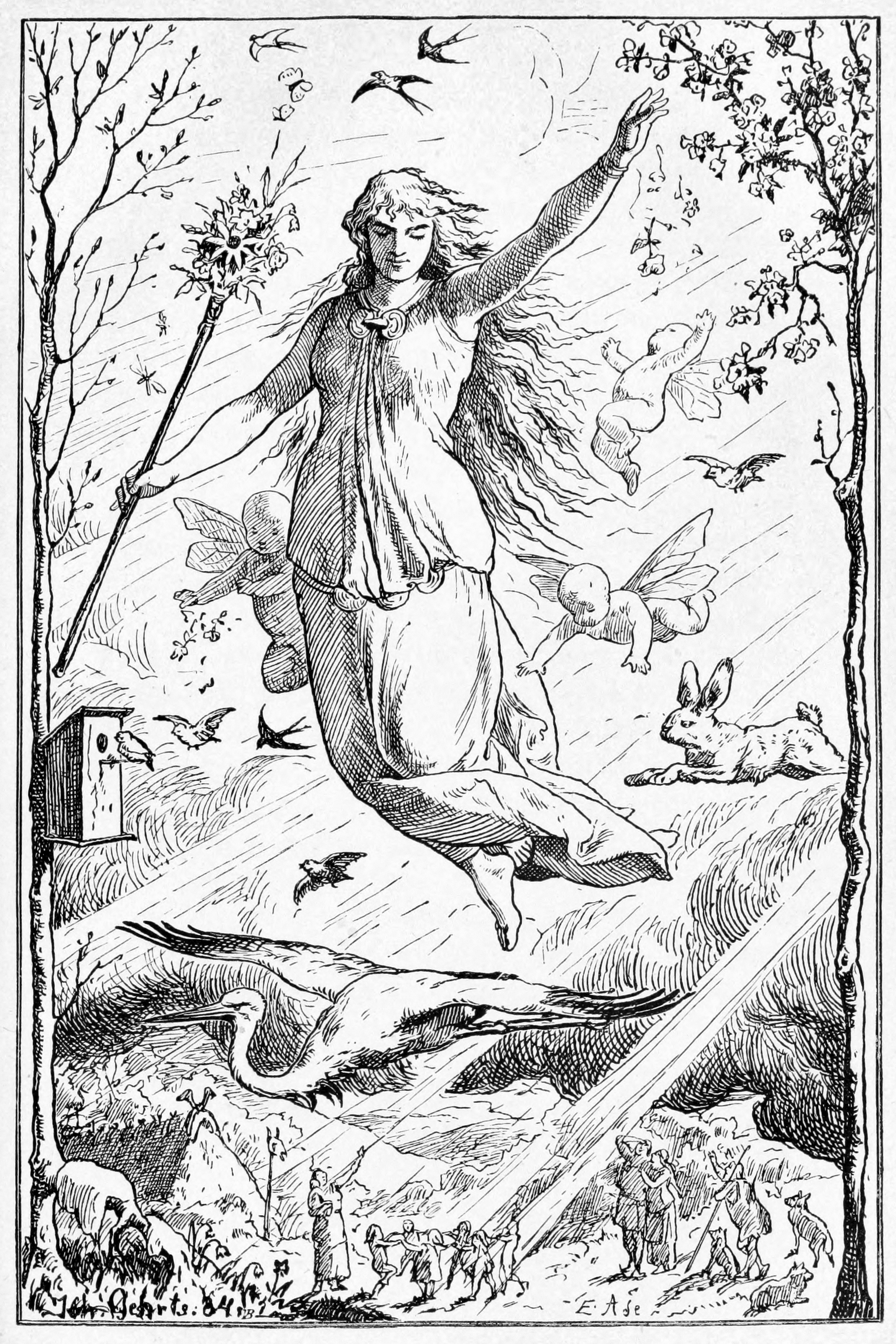
Ostara (1884) by Johannes Gehrts. The goddess flies through the heavens surrounded by Roman-inspired putti, beams of light, and animals. Germanic people look up at the goddess from the realm below.

Ēostre ([ˈeːostre]) is an Anglo-Saxon goddess mentioned by Bede in his 8th century work The Reckoning of Time. He wrote that pagan Anglo-Saxons had held feasts in her honour during the month named after her: Ēosturmōnaþ (April), and that this became the English name for the Paschal season: Easter.

The Old High German name for April was the cognate Ôstarmânoth, which has led scholars to suggest there was a similar Continental Germanic goddess, *Ôstara. Their theory is supported by votive inscriptions dedicated to goddesses called the matronae Austriahenae, found in 1958 in Rhein-Erft-Kreis, Germany. The theonym may also be a part of some placenames and personal names.

By way of linguistic reconstruction, the matter of a goddess called *Austrō(n) in the Proto-Germanic language has been examined in detail since the foundation of Germanic philology in the 19th century by scholar Jacob Grimm and others. As the Germanic languages descend from Proto-Indo-European (PIE), historical linguists have traced the name to a Proto-Indo-European goddess of the dawn *H₂ewsṓs, from which may descend the Germanic goddess at the origin of the Old English Ēostre and the Old High German *Ôstara.

It has been debated whether the goddess was an invention of Bede, particularly before the discovery of the matronae Austriahenae and further developments in Indo-European studies. Due to these later developments, modern scholars generally accept that she was a genuine pagan goddess. Ēostre and Ostara are sometimes referenced in modern popular culture and are venerated in some forms of Germanic neopaganism.

== Name ==
=== Etymology ===
The theonym has been reconstructed as *Ēastre (Old English), *Ôstara (Old High German) and *Āsteron (Old Saxon). These are cognates – linguistic siblings stemming from a common origin. They derive from the Proto-Germanic theonym Austrō(n), itself a descendant of Proto-Indo-European (PIE) *h₂ews-reh₂ (cf. Lithuanian auš(t)rà, 'dawn, daybreak'), extended from the PIE root *h₂ews-, meaning 'to shine, glow (red)'. The modern English east also derives from this root, via the Proto-Germanic adverb *aust(e)raz ('east, eastwards'), from an earlier PIE *h₂ews-tero- ('east, towards the dawn').

According to linguist Guus Kroonen, the Germanic and Baltic languages replaced the old formation *h₂éws-os, the name of the PIE dawn-goddess, with a form in *-reh₂-, likewise found in the Lithuanian deity Aušrinė. In Anglo-Saxon England, her springtime festival gave its name to a month (Northumbrian: Ēosturmōnaþ, West Saxon: Eastermonað), the rough equivalent of April, then to the Christian feast of Easter that eventually displaced it. In southern Medieval Germany, the festival Ôstarûn similarly gave its name to the month Ôstarmânôth, and to the modern feast of Ostern ('Easter'), suggesting that a goddess named *Ôstara was also worshipped there. The name of the month survived into 18th-century German as Ostermonat. An Old Saxon equivalent of the spring goddess named *Āsteron may also be reconstructed from the term asteronhus, which is translated by most scholars as 'Easter-house' and would parallel the Medieval Flemish Paeshuys ('Easter-house'). Frankish historian Einhard also writes in his Vita Karoli Magni (early 9th century CE) that after Charlemagne defeated and converted the continental Saxons to Christianity, he gave Germanic names to the Latin months of the year, which included the Easter-month Ostarmanoth.

The Old English Ēostre is therefore a distant cognate of numerous other dawn goddesses attested among Indo-European-speaking peoples, including Uṣás, Ēṓs, and Aurōra. In the words of the Encyclopedia of Indo-European Culture, "a Proto-Indo-European goddess of the dawn is supported both by the evidence of cognate names and the similarity of mythic representation of the dawn goddess among various Indo-European groups. [...] All of this evidence permits us to posit a Proto-Indo-European *h_{a}éusōs 'goddess of dawn' who was characterized as a 'reluctant' bringer of light for which she is punished. In three of the Indo-European stocks, Baltic, Greek and Indo-Iranian, the existence of a Proto-Indo-European 'goddess of the dawn' is given additional linguistic support in that she is designated the 'daughter of heaven'."

=== Related names ===
Additionally, scholars have linked the goddess's name to a variety of Germanic personal names, a series of location names (toponyms) in England, and, discovered in 1958, over 150 inscriptions from the 2nd–3rd century CE referring to the matronae Austriahenae.

A cluster of place names in England and a variety of English and continental Germanic names include the element *ēoster, an early Old English word reconstructed by linguists and potentially an earlier form of the goddess name Ēostre. The Council of Austerfield called by King Aldfrith of Northumbria shortly before 704 convened at a place described in contemporary records both as in campo qui Eostrefeld dicitur and in campo qui dicitur Oustraefelda, which have led to the site's being identified with Austerfield near Bawtry in South Yorkshire. Such locations also include Eastry (Eastrgena, 788 CE) in Kent, Eastrea (Estrey, 966 CE) in Cambridgeshire, and Eastrington (Eastringatun, 959 CE) in the East Riding of Yorkshire.

The element *ēoster also appears in the Old English name Easterwine, a name borne by Bede's monastery abbot in Wearmouth–Jarrow and which appears an additional three times in the Durham Liber Vitae. The name Aestorhild also appears in the Liber Vitae, and is likely the ancestor of the Middle English name Estrild. Various continental Germanic names include the element, including Austrechild, Austrighysel, Austrovald, and Ostrulf.

In 1958, over 150 Romano-Germanic votive inscriptions to the matronae Austriahenae, a triad of goddesses, were discovered near Morken-Harff, Germany. They are datable to around 150–250 CE. Most of these inscriptions are in an incomplete state, yet many are at least reasonably legible. Some of these inscriptions refer to the Austriates. The name of these goddesses certainly derives from the stem austri-, which, if Germanic, would be cognate with the Old English Eostre, although the goddesses might equally have developed entirely independently.

== Description by Bede ==
Ēosturmōnaþ ('Ēostre's month') was the Anglo-Saxon name for the month of April. In chapter 15 (De mensibus Anglorum, 'The English months') of his 8th-century work De temporum ratione ("The Reckoning of Time"), Bede describes the indigenous month names of the English people. After describing the worship of the goddess Rheda during the Anglo-Saxon month of Hrēþ-mōnaþ, Bede writes about Ēosturmōnaþ, the month of the goddess Ēostre:

Eostur-monath, qui nunc Paschalis mensis interpretatur, quondam a Dea illorum quæ Eostre vocabatur, et cui in illo festa celebrabant nomen habuit: a cujus nomine nunc Paschale tempus cognominant, consueto antiquæ observationis vocabulo gaudia novæ solemnitatis vocantes.

Translation:

Eosturmonath has a name which is now translated "Paschal month", and which was once called after a goddess of theirs named Eostre, in whose honour feasts were celebrated in that month. Now they designate that Paschal season by her name, calling the joys of the new rite by the time-honoured name of the old observance.

=== Academic debate ===
Before the discovery of the matronae Austriahenae in 1958, scholarship on this topic frequently raised the question of whether Bede invented the deity. In 1892, Charles J. Billson noted that scholars before his writing were divided about the existence of Bede's account of Ēostre, stating that "among authorities who have no doubt as to her existence are W. Grimm, Wackernagel, Sinrock [sic], and Wolf. On the other hand, Weinhold rejects the idea on philological grounds, and so do Heinrich Leo and Hermann Oesre. Kuhn says, 'The Anglo-Saxon Eostre looks like an invention of Bede;' and Mannhardt also dismisses her as an etymological dea ex machina." Billson wrote that "the whole question turns [...] upon Bede's credibility", and that "one is inclined to agree with Grimm, that it would be uncritical to saddle this eminent Father of the Church, who keeps Heathendom at arms' length and tells us less of than he knows, with the invention of this goddess." Billson pointed out that the Christianization of England started at the end of the 6th century, and, by the 7th, was completed. Billson argued that, as Bede was born in 672, Bede must have had opportunities to learn the names of the native goddesses of the Anglo-Saxons, "who were hardly extinct in his lifetime."

According to philologist Rudolf Simek in 1984, despite expressions of doubts, Bede's account of Ēostre should not be disregarded. Simek opined that a "spring-like fertility goddess" must be assumed rather than a "goddess of sunrise" regardless of the name, reasoning that "otherwise the Germanic goddesses (and matrons) are mostly connected with prosperity and growth". Simek pointed to a comparison with the goddess Rheda, also attested by Bede.

In 2011 Philip A. Shaw wrote that the subject has seen "a lengthy history of arguments for and against Bede's goddess Ēostre, with some scholars taking fairly extreme positions on either side" and that some theories against the goddess have gained popular cultural prominence. Shaw noted that "much of this debate, however, was conducted in ignorance of a key piece of evidence, as it was not discovered until 1958. This evidence is furnished by over 150 Romano-Germanic votive inscriptions to deities named the matronae Austriahenae, found near Morken-Harff and datable to around 150–250 AD". Most of these inscriptions are in an incomplete state, yet most are complete enough for reasonable clarity of the inscriptions. As early as 1966 scholars have linked these names etymologically with Ēostre and an element found in Germanic personal names. Shaw argued against a functional interpretation of the available evidence and concluded that "the etymological connections of her name suggests that her worshippers saw her geographical and social relationship with them as more central than any functions she may have had".

In a 2022 paper published in Folklore, scholar Richard Sermon rejects Shaw's proposal that Ēostre was a localized goddess. Sermon takes particular issue with Shaw's rejection of an association with the dawn:

Nevertheless, my main objection is that Shaw fails to offer any explanation as to why his local group-specific goddess would have been celebrated at that particular time of year. Shaw sees no reason to doubt Bede's claim that Eosturmonath was named after the goddess Eostre, and finds it hard to believe that Bede would have invented such an explanation given his reputation as a careful researcher (Shaw 2012), yet he ignores the one piece of evidence Bede provides about her cult: the timing of her month and celebrations. If we accept that the month name combines two elements meaning 'east' or 'eastern' and 'month', then the appearance of the equinoctial sunrise and its nearest full-moonrise, in their most easterly positions on the horizon, provide a logical explanation for both the timing and etymology of Eosturmonath. Thus, Shaw's theory cannot be said to have 'done away' with any arguments connecting Eostre—the goddess Bede tells us was worshipped in that month—with the dawn or the spring.

== Jacob Grimm and *Ostara ==
In his 1835 Deutsche Mythologie, philologist Jacob Grimm cites comparative evidence to reconstruct a potential continental Germanic goddess whose name would have been preserved in the Old High German name of Easter, *Ostara. Addressing skepticism towards goddesses mentioned by Bede, Grimm comments that "there is nothing improbable in them, nay the first of them is justified by clear traces in the vocabularies of Germanic tribes." Specifically regarding Ēostre, Grimm continues that:

We Germans to this day call April ostermonat, and ôstarmânoth is found as early as Eginhart (temp. Car. Mag.). The great Christian festival, which usually falls in April or the end of March, bears in the oldest of OHG remains the name ôstarâ [...] it is mostly found in the plural, because two days [...] were kept at Easter. This Ostarâ, like the [Anglo-Saxon] Eástre, must in heathen religion have denoted a higher being, whose worship was so firmly rooted, that the Christian teachers tolerated the name, and applied it to one of their own grandest anniversaries.

Grimm notes that "all of the nations bordering on us have retained the Biblical pascha; even Ulphilas writes 𐍀𐌰𐍃𐌺𐌰, not 𐌰𐌿𐍃𐍄𐍂𐍉 (paska not áustrô), though he must have known the word". Grimm details that the Old High German adverb ôstar "expresses movement towards the rising sun", as did the Old Norse term austr, and potentially also Anglo-Saxon ēastor and Gothic *𐌰𐌿𐍃𐍄𐍂 (*áustr). Grimm compares these terms to the identical Latin term auster, and contends that the cult of the goddess may have been centred around an Old Norse form, Austra, or that her cult may have already been extinct by the time of Christianization.

Grimm notes that the Old Norse Prose Edda book Gylfaginning attests to a male being called Austri, whom he describes as a "spirit of light." Grimm comments that a female version would have been *Austra, yet that the High German and Saxon peoples seem to have only formed Ostarâ and Eástre, feminine, and not Ostaro and Eástra, masculine. Grimm additionally speculates on the nature of the goddess and surviving folk customs that may have been associated with her in Germany:

Ostara, Eástre seems therefore to have been the divinity of the radiant dawn, of upspringing light, a spectacle that brings joy and blessing, whose meaning could be easily adapted by the resurrection-day of the Christian's God. Bonfires were lighted at Easter and according to popular belief of long standing, the moment the sun rises on Easter Sunday morning, he gives three joyful leaps, he dances for joy [...] Water drawn on the Easter morning is, like that at Christmas, holy and healing [...] here also heathen notions seems to have grafted themselves on great Christian festivals. Maidens clothed in white, who at Easter, at the season of returning spring, show themselves in clefts of the rock and on mountains, are suggestive of the ancient goddess.

In the second volume of Deutsche Mythologie, Grimm picked up the subject of Ostara again, speculating on possible connections between the goddess and various German Easter customs, including Easter eggs:

But if we admit, goddesses, then, in addition to Nerthus, Ostara has the strongest claim to consideration. To what we said on [page] 290 I can add some significant facts. The heathen Easter had much in common with May-feast and the reception of spring, particularly in the matter of bonfires. Then, through long ages there seem to have lingered among the people Easter-games so-called, which the church itself had to tolerate: I allude especially to the custom of Easter eggs, and to the Easter tale which preachers told from the pulpit for the people's amusement, connecting it with Christian reminiscences.

Grimm commented on further Easter time customs, including unique sword dances and particular baked goods ("pastry of heathenish form"). In addition, Grimm weighed a potential connection to the Slavic spring goddess Vesna and the Lithuanian Vasara.

According to anthropologist Krystal D'Costa, there is no evidence to connect the tradition of Easter eggs with Ostara. Eggs became a symbol in Christianity associated with rebirth as early as the 1st century CE, via the iconography of the Phoenix egg. D'Costa theorizes that eggs became associated with Easter specifically in medieval Europe, when eating them was prohibited during the fast of Lent. D'Costa highlights that a common practice in England at that time was for children to go door-to-door begging for eggs on the Saturday before Lent began. People handed out eggs as special treats for children prior to their fast.

== Possible connection to Easter Hares ==
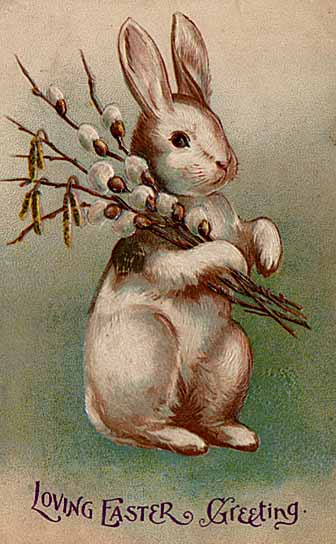
An Easter postcard from 1907 depicting a rabbit

In Northern Europe, Easter imagery often involves hares and rabbits. The first scholar to make a connection between the goddess Eostre and hares was Adolf Holtzmann in his book Deutsche Mythologie. Holtzmann wrote of the tradition, "the Easter Hare is inexplicable to me, but probably the hare was the sacred animal of Ostara; just as there is a hare on the statue of Abnoba." Citing folk Easter customs in Leicestershire, England, where "the profits of the land called Harecrop Leys were applied to providing a meal which was thrown on the ground at the 'Hare-pie Bank'", late 19th-century scholar Charles Isaac Elton speculated on a connection between these customs and the worship of Ēostre. In his late 19th-century study of the hare in folk custom and mythology, Charles J. Billson cited numerous incidents of folk customs involving hares around the Easter season in Northern Europe. Billson said that "whether there was a goddess named Ēostre, or not, and whatever connection the hare may have had with the ritual of Saxon or British worship, there are good grounds for believing that the sacredness of this animal reaches back into an age still more remote, where it is probably a very important part of the great Spring Festival of the prehistoric inhabitants of this island."

Adolf Holtzmann had also speculated that "the hare must once have been a bird, because it lays eggs" in modern German folklore. From this statement, numerous later sources built a modern legend in which the goddess Eostre transformed a bird into an egg-laying hare. A response to a question about the origins of Easter hares in the 8 June 1889 issue of the journal American Notes and Queries stated: "In Germany and among the Pennsylvania Germans toy rabbits or hares made of canton flannel stuffed with cotton are given as gifts on Easter morning. The children are told that this Osh’ter has laid the Easter eggs. This curious idea is thus explained: The hare was originally a bird, and was changed into a quadruped by the goddess Ostara; in gratitude to Ostara or Eastre, the hare exercises its original bird function to lay eggs for the goddess on her festal day." According to folklorist Stephen Winick, by 1900, many popular sources had picked up the story of Eostre and the hare. One described the story as one of the oldest in mythology, "despite the fact that it was then less than twenty years old."

Some scholars have further linked customs and imagery involving hares to both Ēostre and the Norse goddess Freyja. Writing in 1972, John Andrew Boyle cited commentary contained within an etymology dictionary by A. Ernout and A. Meillet, where the authors write that "Little else [...] is known about [Ēostre], but it has been suggested that her lights, as goddess of the dawn, were carried by hares. And she certainly represented spring fecundity, and love and carnal pleasure that leads to fecundity." Boyle responded that nothing is known about Ēostre outside of Bede's single passage, that the authors had seemingly accepted the identification of Ēostre with the Norse goddess Freyja, yet that the hare is not associated with Freyja either. Boyle writes that "her carriage, we are told by Snorri, was drawn by a pair of cats – animals, it is true, which like hares were the familiars of witches, with whom Freyja seems to have much in common." However, Boyle adds that "on the other hand, when the authors speak of the hare as the 'companion of Aphrodite and of satyrs and cupids' and point out that 'in the Middle Ages it appears beside the figure of Luxuria', they are on much surer ground and can adduce the evidence of their illustrations."

The earliest evidence for the Easter Hare (Osterhase) was recorded in south-west Germany in 1678 by the professor of medicine Georg Franck von Franckenau, but it remained unknown in other parts of Germany until the 18th century. Scholar Richard Sermon writes that "hares were frequently seen in gardens in spring, and thus may have served as a convenient explanation for the origin of the colored eggs hidden there for children. Alternatively, there is a European tradition that hares laid eggs, since a hare's scratch or form and a lapwing's nest look very similar, and both occur on grassland and are first seen in the spring. In the nineteenth century the influence of Easter cards, toys, and books was to make the Easter Hare/Rabbit popular throughout Europe. German immigrants then exported the custom to Britain and America where it evolved into the Easter Bunny."

== In modern culture ==
=== Modern paganism ===
A holiday named for the goddess is part of the neopagan Wiccan Wheel of the Year (Ostara, 21 March).

In some forms of modern Germanic paganism, Ēostre (or Ostara) is venerated. Regarding this veneration, Carole M. Cusack comments that, among adherents, Ēostre is "associated with the coming of spring and the dawn, and her festival is celebrated at the spring equinox. Because she brings renewal, rebirth from the death of winter, some Heathens associate Ēostre with Iðunn, keeper of the apples of youth in Scandinavian mythology".

=== Fiction ===
In the first season of the TV series American Gods, based on the novel of the same name, Ostara is portrayed by Kristin Chenoweth. In the series, Ostara has survived into the modern age by forming an alliance with the Goddess of Media (Gillian Anderson) and capitalising on the Christian holiday. Odin (Ian McShane) forces her to accept that those who celebrate Easter are worshipping Jesus and not her, causing her to join his rebellion against the New Gods.

=== Erroneous association with Ishtar ===
In 1853, Scottish Protestant minister Alexander Hislop published The Two Babylons, an anti-Catholic tract. In the tract, Hislop connects modern English Easter with the East Semitic theonym Ishtar by way of folk etymology. For example, from The Two Babylons, third edition:

What means the term Easter itself? It is not a Christian name. It bears its Chaldean origin on its very forehead. Easter is nothing else than Astarte, one of the titles of Beltis, the queen of heaven, whose name, as pronounced by the people of Ninevah, was evidently identical with that now in common use in this country. This name as found by Layard on the Assyrian monuments, is Ishtar.

Because Hislop's claims have no linguistics foundation, his claims were rejected, but the Two Babylons would go on to have some influence in popular culture. In the 2000s, a popular Internet meme similarly claimed an incorrect linguistic connection between English Easter and Ishtar.

=== Science and technology ===
The name has been adopted for an asteroid (343 Ostara, 1892 by Max Wolf).

=== Music ===
In music, the name Ostara has been adopted as a name by the musical group Ostara, and as the names of albums by :zoviet*france: (Eostre, 1984) and The Wishing Tree (Ostara, 2009).

=== Politics ===
Politically, the name of Ostara was in the early 20th century invoked as the name of a German nationalist magazine, book series and publishing house established in 1905 at Mödling, Austria.

== See also ==
- Aurvandil, a Germanic being associated with stars, the first element of whose name is cognate to Ēostre
- Dellingr, a potential personification of the dawn in Norse mythology
- Hengist and Horsa, euhemerised Old English deities, possibly extending from Proto-Indo-European religion
- Mōdraniht, the Old English "Mothers' night," also attested by Bede
- Old High German lullaby, a lullaby in Old High German that mentions Ostara, generally held to be a literary forgery
- Tīw, the Old English extension of the Proto-Indo-European sky deity
