= Eumeria =

- Origin: Texas, United States, London & Telford, England
- Genre: Progressive Metal
- Years active: 2009–present
- Label: Rebel Tide Entertainment
- Members: Jonny Tatum (vocals); Reece Fullwood (guitar); Matt Guillory (keyboards); Kevin Bartlett (drums); Derek Blakley (bass guitar)
- Past members: Bobby Williamson (keyboards); Shawn Kascak (bass guitar); Adam Sagan (drums); Chris Prema (guitars on demo)
- Website: www.eumeria.com

Eumeria is a multi-national progressive metal band, formed in 2009 by American keyboardist Bobby Williamson, and British musicians Jonny Tatum (vocals) and Reece Fullwood (guitars). The band name is rumored to be derived from a cross between the words "Europe" and "America".

== History ==
Eumeria began as a solo project by Bobby Williamson (Outworld and Thought Chamber), who had planned to hire various singers and musicians to create an album. After Williamson heard the initial demo tracks laid down by Jonny Tatum (Timefall) and Reece Fullwood, however, he realized that something more important was about to be born. Williamson, along with Tatum and Fullwood, agreed to scratch the project idea and move forward as a fully operational band with dedicated members. Shawn Kascak, former Outworld bandmate of Williamson's, was selected to play bass guitar, while Adam Sagan, formerly of Into Eternity, was picked to be the drummer.

The recordings for the debut album began at Origin Sound studio in Texas, but Williamson, Tatum, and Fullwood felt that Sagan's drumming style was not a perfect match for the material. The decision was made to find the right drummer for the band and replace the drum tracks. Kevin Bartlett (Anubis), a local friend of Fullwood's, was selected for the position. In 2010 Bartlett began recording new drum tracks at The Smash Room studio in Telford, England. Around this time Kascak injured his right hand and was only able to record bass guitar on two tracks. Eumeria subsequently hired Derek Blakley (Haji's Kitchen) and Michael Millsap (Six Minute Century) to step in and assist with the bass guitar duties until Kascak's hand healed.

2011 saw the unveiling of Eumeria's debut album Rebel Mind (mixed and mastered by Jacob Hansen). Although the band had several record deal offers, they chose to take a more independent approach to market and distribute their music via the latest digital technologies available on the internet. The physical album (CD) was distributed by their own record label, Rebel Tide Entertainment, which included licensing deals through Century Media for the USA and Code 7/Plastic Head for the UK and Europe.

In December 2013, Eumeria was invited by former Dream Theater drummer Mike Portnoy to perform at the Progressive Nation at Sea Festival in February 2014. Other acts on the bill included Pain of Salvation, Periphery, Haken, Animals as Leaders, Transatlantic, King's X, Devin Townsend Project, Jon Anderson (of Yes), Tony Harnell and Bumblefoot, amongst others.

On February 24, 2014, Eumeria made the announcement that Derek Blakley (Haji's Kitchen and Thought Chamber) had become the new bass player in the band, replacing Shawn Kascak.

In July 2014 American Keyboardist Matt Guillory (James LaBrie, MullMuzzler, Dali's Dilemma) joined the band, replacing Bobby Williamson (who decided to step down for health reasons).

Though progress has been slow, Eumeria are currently in pre-production for their second album, which is due for release in 2020. Two new demos, Open Ground and 7 Hours To Nowhere, were released on their official YouTube channel in March 2016 and February 2018, respectively.

== Sound, style and influences ==
Eumeria has been described as a progressive metal band, which fits with some of their self-proclaimed influences in writing such as Dream Theater, Opeth, Megadeth, Pantera and Queen.

== Band line-up ==
- Jonny Tatum – vocals
- Reece Fullwood – guitar
- Matt Guillory – keyboards
- Derek Blakley – bass guitar
- Kevin Bartlett – drums

=== Former members ===
- Bobby Williamson – keyboards
- Chris Prema – guitar
- Adam Sagan – drums
- Shawn Kascak – bass guitar

== Discography ==
- Rebel Mind (2011)
