= The Great Divide (Enchant album) =

Studio album by Enchant
- Released: September 30, 2014
- Genre: Progressive metal, progressive rock, neo-prog
- Length: 64:06
- Label: InsideOut Music
- Producer: Douglas A. Ott

Enchant chronology
Live at Last (2004)	The Great Divide (2014)

Professional ratings
Review scores
Source	Rating
Allmusic	4/5 stars

The Great Divide is the eighth studio album by the neo-prog band Enchant. It was released 11 years after their previous studio album, Tug of War.

== Track listing ==
1. "Circles" (Ott, Jenkins, Platt, Flanegan) – 7:59
2. "Within an Inch" (Ott, Leonard) – 7:34
3. "The Great Divide" (Ott, Jenkins, Platt, Flanegan) – 9:05
4. "All Mixed Up" (Leonard) – 4:12
5. "Transparent Man" (Ott) – 6:20
6. "Life in a Shadow" (Leonard) – 5:00
7. "Deserve to Feel" (Ott, Leonard, Jenkins, Platt, Flanegan) – 8:01
8. "Here and Now" (Platt, Jenkins, Ott) – 7:33
9. "Prognosticator" (Special Edition bonus track) (Ott, Jenkins, Platt, Flanegan) – 8:22

== Personnel ==
- Ted Leonard – vocals, guitar
- Douglas A. Ott – guitar, vocals, Mellotron, bass pedals
- Bill Jenkins – keyboards, organ, piano
- Ed Platt – bass
- Sean Flanagan – drums, percussion

=== Production ===
- Jennifer Huls, James E. Ott – photography
- Thomas Ewerhard – design, layout design
- Tom Size – mixing
- Peter Van 'T Riet – mastering
