= Angular Perceptions =

Studio album by Thought Chamber
- Released: February 4, 2007
- Genre: Progressive metal
- Length: 54:58
- Label: InsideOut Music

Thought Chamber chronology
Angular Perceptions (2007)	Psykerion (2013)

Angular Perceptions is the debut album by the American progressive metal supergroup Thought Chamber. The album received high praise from Sea of Tranquility webzine. Reviewer Murat Batmaz voted it the best debut album of 2007, comparing Ted Leonard's vocal style to Kansas and describing the music as " whimsical, with plenty of slap bass a la King's X, and [...]intense groove-inflected riffage and vintage '70s prog, throwing in eastern scales and eerie minor chord progressions."

== Track listing ==
_{All tracks by Michael Harris except where otherwise noted}

1. "Premonition" – 2:11
2. "Sacred Treasure" – 7:06
3. "A Legend's Avalon" – 5:48
4. "Balance of One" – 6:17
5. "Mr Qwinkle's Therapy" (Derek Blakley, Harris, Robert Stankiewicz) – 5:32
6. "Transmigration of Souls" – 6:41
7. "God of Oblique" – 5:09
8. "Silent Shore" – 3:40
9. "Accidentally on Purpose" (Blakley, Harris, Stankiewicz) – 4:52
10. "A Mind Beyond" – 7:38

== Personnel ==
- Ted Leonard – vocals
- Michael Harris – guitars, keyboards, vocals
- Derek Blakley – bass
- Rob Stankiewicz – drums
- Bobby Williamson – keyboards
