= John Helmer (musician) =

British musician and writer

John Helmer (born 1956) is a musician and part-time writer best known for contributing lyrics for Marillion.

== With The Piranhas ==
From 1977 to 1981, "Johnny" Helmer was a guitarist and vocalist in the Brighton-based ska punk band The Piranhas, best known for their 1980 top ten hit "Tom Hark". Helmer formed The Piranhas with 'Boring' Bob Grover while attending Sussex University, where he obtained a degree in English Literature. After The Piranhas split in 1981, Helmer formed a "cabaret busking group" called Pookiesnackenburger with Nick Dwyer, formerly with Nicky and the Dots. They had a Spinal Tap-like series on Channel Four TV and also appeared in a Heineken commercial. Pookiesnackenburger finally evolved into the dance troupe Stomp. Helmer and Grover reformed the band in 2010 as The Piranhas 3D, with a new rhythm section.

== With Marillion ==
After the departure of Fish (1988), whose complex lyrics had been a signature feature of Marillion's music, the band was uncertain whether any successor would be able to write lyrics on a similar level. EMI put them in touch with Helmer at this point. They eventually found Steve Hogarth, who already had experience in writing lyrics for his previous project How We Live. Still, Helmer went on to contribute to Marillion albums over the next decade. He also wrote most lyrics for Carnival of Souls, a 1996 album by Marillion guitarist Steve Rothery's side project The Wishing Tree. After a gap of over ten years, Marillion's 2012 album Sounds That Can't Be Made featured a Helmer lyric on Pour My Love.

== As a writer ==
In 1999, Helmer published a novel titled Mother Tongue.

As of 1999, Helmer held a day job as a marketing manager for a Brighton-based internet company.

Helmer worked on material with Bob Grover, Owen Kellett (bass) and Steve Burnaby Davies (drums) from Brighton band 'Dates'.

== Bibliography ==
- Mother Tongue, Quartet Books, 1 April 1999, ISBN 0-7043-8105-2
