= Coshish =

Hindi progressive rock band

- Origin: Mumbai, India
- Genres: Progressive rock, progressive metal
- Years active: 2006–present
- Label: Universal Music India
- Members: Mangesh Gandhi; Shrikant Sreenivasan; Hamza Kazi; Anish Nair
- Website: coshish.com

Coshish is a Hindi progressive rock band from Mumbai, formed in 2006. Their debut album Firdous was released via Universal Music India and they are currently working on a box set, which will be released later this year. The band believes that their music should have mass appeal and yet showcase their musical dexterity. Their songs are as simple as they are complex and carry strong social messages, delivered through Hindi lyrics. The members endorse Mapex Drums, Paiste Cymbals, Blade Guitars, ESP Basses and Laney Amplifiers.

== History ==
In 2006, Coshish started out as a singer/songwriter duo consisting Mangesh Gandhi (guitars/vocals) and Shrikant Sreenivasan (guitars). They recruited a drummer and bassist from the local rock scene to form an alternative rock quartet and began competing at band competitions at various colleges. By early 2008, after a couple of line-up changes, Coshish was joined by Hamza Kazi on drums and Anish Nair on bass, becoming a progressive rock outfit.

Coshish's performed frequently at various clubs and released HD quality live videos of their performances and that eventually lead them to album deal with Universal Music India.

Their debut album Firdous was released on 2 September 2013, after being in the making for about four years. It was recorded, mixed and produced by Zorran Mendonsa from New Zealand and mastered by Jens Bogren at Fascination Street in Sweden. The album artwork was a collaboration between Bernard Dumaine from France and Daeve Fellows from Canada with additional packaging photography and graphics by Bharath Chandrasekhar and Imran Ladak from India.

The anticipation for Firdous was so high that they set a record number of pre-orders on Flipkart, India's premiere E-tail website. It eventually made it to No. 8 on iTunes India and No. 28 on Nokia Music Store India.

A music video for their first single "Raastey" was released on the band's VEVO Channel on 25 October 2013. The concept of the video is a continuation of the story of Firdous, which can be decoded by the listener by putting together pieces of the puzzle that are present throughout the album and its packaging. The video was aired frequently on MTV India and MTV Indies since its launch in March 2014. "Raastey" was the song of the day on 1 April 2014 on MTV Indies and on 6 October 2013 on 8 Octaves, a local website focusing on Indie Music. It was also listed in the "Top 25 Tracks of 2013" by Rock Street Journal and in "9 Impressive Indie Music Videos" by Soundtree Magazine.

Their second music video for their song "Bhula Do Unhey" was released on 19 March 2014. It acts as the final piece of the puzzle. A third music video for their song "Hum Hai Yahin", sponsored by Nokia India, was released on the same day as "Bhula Do Unhey". It was shot entirely on a Nokia Lumia 1520.

The band is currently working on a limited edition DVD Box Set, which will be released later this year.

In July 2015, they co-organized and co-curated (with Rainburn) the progressive rock music festival Progworks.

== Awards and nominations ==
Year	Nominated work	Award	Result
2013	"Raastey" (music video)	VIMA Music Awards: Best Video and Best Rock Song	Nominated
2013	Coshish - Firdous (album)	Rolling Stone Jack Daniel's Rock Awards 2013: Best Band, Best Album and Best Drummer	Nominated
2013	Coshish - Maya (song)	Rolling Stone Jack Daniel's Rock Awards 2013: Best Drummer (Hamza Kazi)	Won
2014	Coshish (band)	Radio City Freedom Awards: Best Rock Band	Won
2014	Coshish (band)	UK's Progressive Music Awards: Anthem category and Limelight category	Nominated
2015	Coshish - Firdous (album)	GIMA: Best Rock Album	Nominated

== Line-up ==
=== Current members ===
- Mangesh Gandhi – vocals, guitar (2006–present)
- Shrikant Sreenivasan – guitar (2006–present)
- Hamza Kazi – drums (2008–present)
- Anish Nair – bass (2008–present)

== Discography ==
- Firdous (2013)

Singles

- "Raastey" (2013)
- "Bhula Do Unhey" (2014)
- "Hum Hai Yahin" (2014)
