= Rainburn =

Indian progressive rock band from Bangalore

- Origin: Bangalore, Karnataka, India
- Genres: Progressive rock
- Years active: 2011–present
- Label: Unherd
- Members: Vats Iyengar; Saakallya Biswas; Neilroy Miranda
- Past members: Ravi Nair; Praveen Kumar; Vineet Gogoi; Allan Julius Fernandes; Toshimoa Jamir; Shishir Gupta; Abhishek Prakash; Ashwin Ethiraj; Avik Chakravarty; Jayaram Kasi
- Website: www.rainburn.com

Rainburn is an Indian progressive rock band formed in 2011 in Bangalore. They went through a number of line-up changes until their current formation that includes founding member Vats Iyengar (vocals/guitar) and recent additions Saakallya Biswas (guitars, backing vocals) and Neilroy Miranda (drums).

Amidst these changes and intense domestic touring, the band recorded and released its debut EP Canvas of Silence in 2014. With their most enduring line-up, they released their debut and latest album Insignify (2018).

== Etymology ==
Vocalist Vats Iyengar stated in a 2015 interview that drummer Praveen Kumar came up with the name Rainburn. He also explained: "I'm a big fan of bands that work with opposites. Like Led and Zeppelin or Black and Sabbath. The name suggests that we are covering a very wide spectrum of music. I like Metallica but that kind of name would be so limiting to me. Rainburn allows us that luxury."

== History ==
=== Early years (2011–2013) ===
Rainburn was founded by keyboardist Avik Chakravarty and vocalist/guitarist Vats Iyengar in 2011. The duo was soon joined by drummer Praveen Kumar (Blood & Iron) and bassist Jayaram Kasi. Since its inception, the band has gone through a number of line-up changes, apart from some financial bad times.

In 2012, they started to gig, first in their hometown of Bangalore, then in southern India. Also in that year, Jayaram left and was replaced by Shishir Gupta and the quartet recorded two demo songs, "End of Sleep" and "Listen Through the Noise".

In 2013, the band went through several successive line-up changes: Avik left and was replaced by keyboardist Ashwin Ethiraj, but he quickly left too and the band decided to hire a second guitarist instead: Abhishek Prakash (ex-Groove Chutney). He didn't last long either and quit the quartet as they were recording their debut EP, being replaced by Toshimoa Jamir.

=== Canvas of Silence (2014–2016) ===
Following a 2014 local release, they globally released their debut EP Canvas of Silence, which was defined by The Hindu as "a brilliant blend of opposing Indo-progressive tonalities that throb together in eclectic energy, exuding the band's vibrant take on music that is rooted and yet atmospheric". It was ranked as the 4th best 2015 progressive rock album by Classic Rock. By that time, they were already thinking of a full-length album.

In early 2015, the band faced another formation change: Toshimoa and Shishir left and were replaced by Vineet Gogoi and Allan Julius Fernandes, respectively. In July of that year, they co-organized and co-curated (with Coshish) the progressive rock music festival Progworks. In October, they were joined on stage by Ted Leonard (Spock's Beard) for an unplugged performance of "Refuge". By 2016, Fernandes and Gogoi left and were replaced by Ravi Nair and Paraj Kumar Singh, respectively (the latter on a live basis only).

=== Insignify and Resignify (2017–2021) ===
In 2017, the band released its first music video, "Merchant of Dreams", a single coming from their then upcoming debut full-length album, by then known as The Anthropic Conceit and expected to be funded by a campaign in Fuel a Dream and succeeded by a tour. By 2018, however, the album was being promoted with a new title: Insignify. It was elected one of the best 2018 Indian albums by Rolling Stone India.

In 2019, they released their second EP, Resignify, consisting of acoustic versions of songs from their two previous releases.

In May 2020, the band announced on their Facebook page that two members had departed sometime late 2019. A few days later, they announced their new guitarist and backing vocalist, Saakallya Biswas. On 11 June, they officially announced that longtime drummer Praveen Kumar had left the band since late 2019. On 9 September, they announced Neilroy Miranda as their new drummer. On 2 February 2021, they announced the departure of longtime bassist Ravi Nair for personal reasons.

=== Vignettes (2021–present) ===
In October 2023, Rainburn announced their second studio album, and the first to feature Biswas and Miranda, Vignettes. It was scheduled for a 24 November release and would consist of standalone tracks, unlike the previous album, which was a concept one. However, all songs still deal with a common theme, which is life in a metropolis. The album was first promoted by the single "Outrage-Seeking Generation Z Brain", which received a video directed by Pranwat Singh. The song criticizes cancel culture and the "death of centrism" and was musically described by Iyengar as "Tool meets Bon Jovi". Bass duties on the album were handled by Iyengar.

== Musical style ==
The band is normally defined as a progressive rock ensemble. In a 2015 interview, drummer Praveen Kumar stated that "the genre also allows a lot of scope to experiment and better ourselves." Vocalist Vats Iyengar added:

Progressive is a label that people put on music that has certain characters on rhythms and odd time signatures. We never sit down and make it. It comes naturally to us. I also like the term itself. Why choose an expression that belongs to someone else and limit yourself? The term progressive allows us to push the envelope. [...] I'd like to think we make our music organically. We don't want to be a technical band that doesn't enjoy or express themselves in our music.

The band members have different influences and musical tastes. Vats is a fan of pop and progressive rock while Praveen enjoys modern heavy metal. The band is also influenced by Indian and fusion music such as Shakti and Prasanna.

== Members ==
=== Current members ===
- Vats Iyengar – lead vocals, guitars (2011–present)
- Saakallya Biswas – guitars, backing vocals (2020–present)
- Neilroy Miranda – drums (2020–present)

=== Former live member ===
- Paraj Kumar Singh – guitars (2016–2019)

=== Past members ===
- Ravi Nair – bass, backing vocals (2016–2021)
- Praveen Kumar – drums (2011–2019)
- Vineet Gogoi – guitars, backing vocals (2015–2016)
- Allan Julius Fernandes – bass, backing vocals (2015–2016)
- Toshimoa Jamir – guitars (2013–2015)
- Shishir Gupta – bass (2012–2015)
- Abhishek Prakash – guitars (2013)
- Ashwin Ethiraj – keyboards (2013)
- Avik Chakravarty – keyboards (2011–3013)
- Jayaram Kasi – bass (2011–2012)

== Discography ==
Albums

- Insignify (2018)
- Vignettes (2023)

EPs

- Canvas of Silence (2014)
- Resignify (2019)

Singles

- "Outrage-Seeking Generation Z Brain" (2023)
