= Carnival of Souls (The Wishing Tree album) =

Studio album by The Wishing Tree
- Released: September 1996 (original edition); January 2001 (enhanced re-release)
- Recorded: Live Oak Studios, Berkeley; UTB Studios & The Racket Club, 1996
- Genre: Folk rock
- Length: 43:41 (original edition) (two-disc edition)
- Label: Dorian Music, Racket Records (re-release)
- Producer: Steve Rothery

The Wishing Tree chronology
Carnival of Souls (1996)	Ostara (2009)

Re-release cover
- cover of the repackaged 2001 version

Carnival of Souls is the title of the first album by The Wishing Tree, a project by Marillion's guitarist Steve Rothery and singer Hannah Stobart. It was originally released in 1996 on Steve Rothery's short-lived label Dorian Music and was re-released in 2001 on Marillion's label Racket Records. The new version includes some bonus material, two live videos and two demos of previously unreleased songs.

The music was mostly written by Rothery; although Stobart gets writing co-credits on each track, her input is described as "additional vocal melodies" in the liner notes. Except for one track, all lyrics were written by John Helmer, who regularly contributed lyrics for Marillion after the departure of Fish. Marillion's second singer Steve Hogarth is credited with "additional vocal melodies" on one track, "Nightwater". This is because the song had originally been rehearsed for Seasons End (1989), but was eventually rejected. Apart from Rothery and Stobart, the lineup includes Marillion's Pete Trewavas on bass guitar, Enchant's drummer Paul Craddick (also on keyboards on some tracks) and Rothery's wife Jo (backing vocals on two tracks). Produced by Rothery, the album was recorded and mixed with the help of Stewart Every and Mike Hunter, both longtime engineers with Marillion.

== Track listing ==
1. "Evergreen" (Rothery/Helmer/Stobart) – 5:52
2. "Starfish" (Rothery/Helmer/Stobart) – 3:08
3. "Nightwater" (Rothery/Helmer/Stobart/Hogarth) – 4:23
4. "Hall Of Memories" (Rothery/Helmer/Stobart) – 4:10
5. "Midnight Snow" (Rothery/Helmer/Stobart/Hogarth) – 6:01
6. "Night Of The Hunter" (Rothery/Helmer/Stobart) – 3:58
7. "Firebright" (Rothery/Helmer/Stobart) – 3:06
8. "Thunder In Tinseltown" (Rothery/Helmer/Stobart) – 4:34
9. "Empire Of Lies" (Rothery/Helmer/Stobart) – 5:32
10. "The Dance" (Rothery/Stobart) – 2:57

=== Enhanced CD portion (2001 reissue) ===
11. "Hall of Memories" (Live Video)
12. "Starfish" (Live Video)
13. "Man the Hunter" (Audio Demo)
14. "She Moved Through the Fair" (traditional/Padraic Colum) (Audio Demo)

== Personnel ==
- Hannah Stobart – vocals (all tracks)
- Steve Rothery – guitars (all tracks), keyboards (tracks 1, 3, 5, 8, 9)
- Pete Trewavas – bass (tracks 1, 3, 5, 6, 9)
- Paul Craddick – drums (tracks 1, 3, 5, 6, 9), keyboards (tracks 1, 8, 9)
- Jo Rothery – backing vocals (tracks 1, 8)
