= Live at Last (Enchant album) =

Live At Last

Live album by Enchant
- Released: October 26, 2004
- Recorded: March 13, 2004
- Genre: Progressive rock
- Label: InsideOut Music
- Producer: Douglas A. Ott

Enchant chronology
Tug of War (2003)	Live At Last (2004)	The Great Divide (2014)

Professional ratings
Review scores
Source	Rating
Allmusic	3/5 stars
DPRP	8.5/10 stars

Live At Last is the first live album by the neo-prog band Enchant, released in 2004. The album was recorded at I-Musicast in Oakland, CA, on March 13, 2004 Next to de cd there is a dvd of this concert.

== Track listing ==
1. "Mae Dae" [instrumental] (Benignus, Ott) – 3:23
2. "At Death's Door" (Cline, Craddick) – 7:15
3. "Sinking Sand" (Leonard, Ott, Platt) – 7:46
4. "Under Fire" (Leonard, Ott) – 6:11
5. "Broken Wave" (Craddick, Ott) – 5:46
6. "Blindsided" (Craddick, Leonard) – 6:45
7. "Acquaintance" (Ott) – 7:04
8. "Monday" (Leonard, Ott) – 7:58
9. "Progtology" (Ott) – 6:54
10. "The Thirst" (Ott) – 6:39
11. "Paint the Picture" (Ott) – 6:50
12. "Under the Sun" (Leonard, Ott, Platt) – 7:40
13. "What to Say" (Craddick, Leonard, Ott) – 4:57
14. "My Enemy" (Geimer, Leonard) – 6:51
15. "Follow the Sun" (Ott) – 6:05
16. "Break" (Ott) – 4:48
17. "Seeds of Hate" (Leonard, Ott) – 6:21
18. "Comatose" (Ott) – 8:58
19. "Black Eyes & Broken Glass" (Craddick, Ott) – 4:44
20. "Colors Fade" (Craddick, Ott) – 5:12
21. "Pure" (Craddick, Ott) – 7:33
22. "Below Zero" (Ott) – 6:32
23. "Oasis" (Leonard, Ott) – 9:13

== Personnel ==
- Sean Flanagan – drums, percussion
- Bill Jenkins – keyboards
- Ted Leonard – guitar, vocals
- Douglas A. Ott – guitar, vocals
- Ed Platt – bass guitar

=== Production ===
- Stefan Beeking – photography
- Thomas Ewerhard – design, layout design
- Douglas A. Ott – liner notes, mixing
- Markus Teske – mastering
