= Break (Enchant album) =

Studio album by Enchant
- Released: 1998
- Recorded: at the Ottotorium & K. F. R. S.
- Genre: Progressive rock
- Label: InsideOut Music
- Producer: Douglas A. Ott

Enchant chronology
Time Lost (1997)	Break (1998)	Juggling 9 Or Dropping 10 (2000)

Professional ratings
Review scores
Source	Rating
Allmusic	2.5/5 stars

Break is the fourth studio album by the neo-prog band Enchant. It was released in 1998.

== Track listing ==
1. "Break" (Music & Lyrics by Douglas Ott) – 5:04
2. "King" (Music by Paul Craddick/Ott; Lyrics by Ott) – 4:34
3. "My Enemy" (Music by Michael Geimer; Lyrics by Ted Leonard) – 6:58
4. "Defenseless" (Music & Lyrics by Ott) – 4:54
5. "The Lizard" (Music by Craddick/Ott; Lyrics by Craddick) – 4:45
6. "Surrounded" (Music by Ott/Geimer; Lyrics by Ott) – 4:18
7. "Silence" (Music & Lyrics by Ott) – 3:36
8. "In the Dark" (Music by Craddick/Ott/Geimer; Lyrics by Craddick) – 5:49
9. "My Gavel Hand" (Music by Ott; Lyrics by Leonard) – 5:05
10. "The Cross" (Music & Lyrics by Craddick) – 6:58
11. "Once a Week" (Bonus track) (Music & Lyrics by Leonard) - 6:24

== Personnel ==
- Ted Leonard – lead vocals; bass (track 1)
- Douglas A. Ott – guitars; backing vocals (tracks 1, 3), bass (tracks 2–4, 6–10)
- Mike "Benignus" Geimer – keyboards
- Paul Craddick – drums; piano (track 11)

=== Additional personnel ===
- Bad Madsen – bass (track 5)
- Tony Mariano – bass (track 11)

=== Production ===
- Paul Craddick – second engineer
- Thomas Ewerhard – artwork
- Kurt Foster – additional recording
- Ken Lee – mastering
- Douglas A. Ott – recording
- Tom Size – mixing
