= Numen (band) =

Spanish progressive rock band (1992-2000, 2012-)

- Origin: Alicante, Spain
- Genres: Progressive rock
- Years active: 1992-2000, 2011-present
- Labels: Mylodon Records
- Members: Alba Hernández; Víctor Arques; Gaspar Martínez; Manuel Mas; Jorge Camarero
- Website: numenmusic.com

Numen (rock band) is a Spanish progressive rock band from Alicante formed in 1992. Currently, Alba Hernández and Jorge Camarero are the new singer and guitarist, respectively.

Numen has become one of the most known progressive rock bands in Spain from the 1990s. The band's sound is predominantly neoprogressive, although they mention The Beatles, Genesis, Pink Floyd and Marillion as their main influences.

== Current members ==
- Alba Hernández – vocals (2020–)
- Jorge Camarero – guitars (2022–)
- Manuel Mas – keyboards (1992–2000, 2012–)
- Víctor Arques – bass and vocals (1992–2000, 2012–)
- Gaspar Martínez – drums (1992–2000, 2012–)

== Former members ==
- Antonio Valiente – guitar (1992–2000, 2012–2014)
- César Alcaraz – vocals (1996–2000, 2012–2019)
- Marcos Beviá – guitar (2014–2019)
- Juanjo Herrera – guitars (2019–2022)

== History ==
Numen was born as a trio in 1992, although Antonio joined a few months later. The former band was composed of Víctor Arques (vocals and bass), Manuel Mas (keyboards), Antonio Valiente (guitar), and Gaspar Martínez (drums). From the beginning of its musical career, the band has been pointing its style to a quite elaborate kind of music, whose main aim is melody and instrumental arrangements. All these qualities are perfectly mixed up with a deep feeling in their lyrics. The final result consists of a kind of mosaic where spontaneity and innovation fit together through the music style of progressive rock, one of the most suitable fields for musical experimentation.

=== The era with César Alcaraz ===
In 1996 César Alcaraz joined the band as vocalist. His style goes together amazingly well with the musical conception of the band. From that moment, the recording project of their first album, named Samsara, arose.

Samsara (Sanskrit word for the concept of reincarnation cycles) is a conceptual record in which the band aims to show all the things that surround the man as an integrated part of the cosmos. Each song of the CD is related to vital concepts that directly influence the human being (cultural backgrounds, freedom, love, old age,...).

The Samsara record is composed of nine songs starting from different musical plans which have driven the band towards some free structural developments. Its melody and instrumental arrangements create atmospheres that aim to bring the listener to each of the situations their lyrics reflect. Through this first album, Numen made themselves known through prog rock catalogues from Italy, the UK, the US and Japan, among other countries. Samsara has also had very good reviews all over the world.

In 2000 Numen dissolved as a band; from that time its members have been engaged in personal projects.

But after a long separation, the Numen members reunited; one, to celebrate the 15th anniversary of Samsara's release in 2013, and, two, to publish their second work Numenclature. The album exhibits a high degree of maturity in their music. The songs included in Numenclature cover several styles such as classical rock, prog rock, folk, etc. As they had fifteen years ago, Numen has had a great deal of good reviews. Despite the global crisis suffered by the music industry, Numenclature has found a place in prog rock catalogs from around the world. As well as their new CD, filmmaker Alejandro Moreno has launched a DVD calledNumenclature. A journey in progressive devoted to prog rock in Spain through the making of Numenclature. Furthermore, taking advantage of social networks, a videoclip has been filmed based on the song "The camel’s back" in order to announce the reunion and the return of Numen.

At the end of 2014, Antonio Valiente, Numen's guitarist, left the group, and was replaced by Marcos Beviá.

Since that moment, a new stage began in which, instead of falling into a long lethargy as after the publication of Samsara in 1998, Numen performed concerts for the presentation of their second album Numenclature. This second work was received positively by specialized critics.

Meanwhile, Numen has taken advantage of this new impulse to undertake their newest, musical project that was published in March 2019. On this occasion, Numen has published their album Cyclomythia in vinyl format. Cyclothymia (consisting of six tracks) may well be Numen's darkest album, its name deriving from the mood and personality disorder named cyclomythia. It is not a conceptual disc, although it nears this style by virtue of its exploration of the moods a human can sink into when life becomes a burden and a torment. There are other, less melancholic, themes in the album, such as in "Lady of the Winds" or "A Cosmic Prayer", which extol the value of the little things that surround us. Only the first theme, "The Man with the X-Ray Eyes", is outside of either categorisation, as a parody theme criticising the ease with which the human being makes value judgments. In 2019 Numen signed with the record label Mylodon Records.

=== The era with Alba Hernández ===
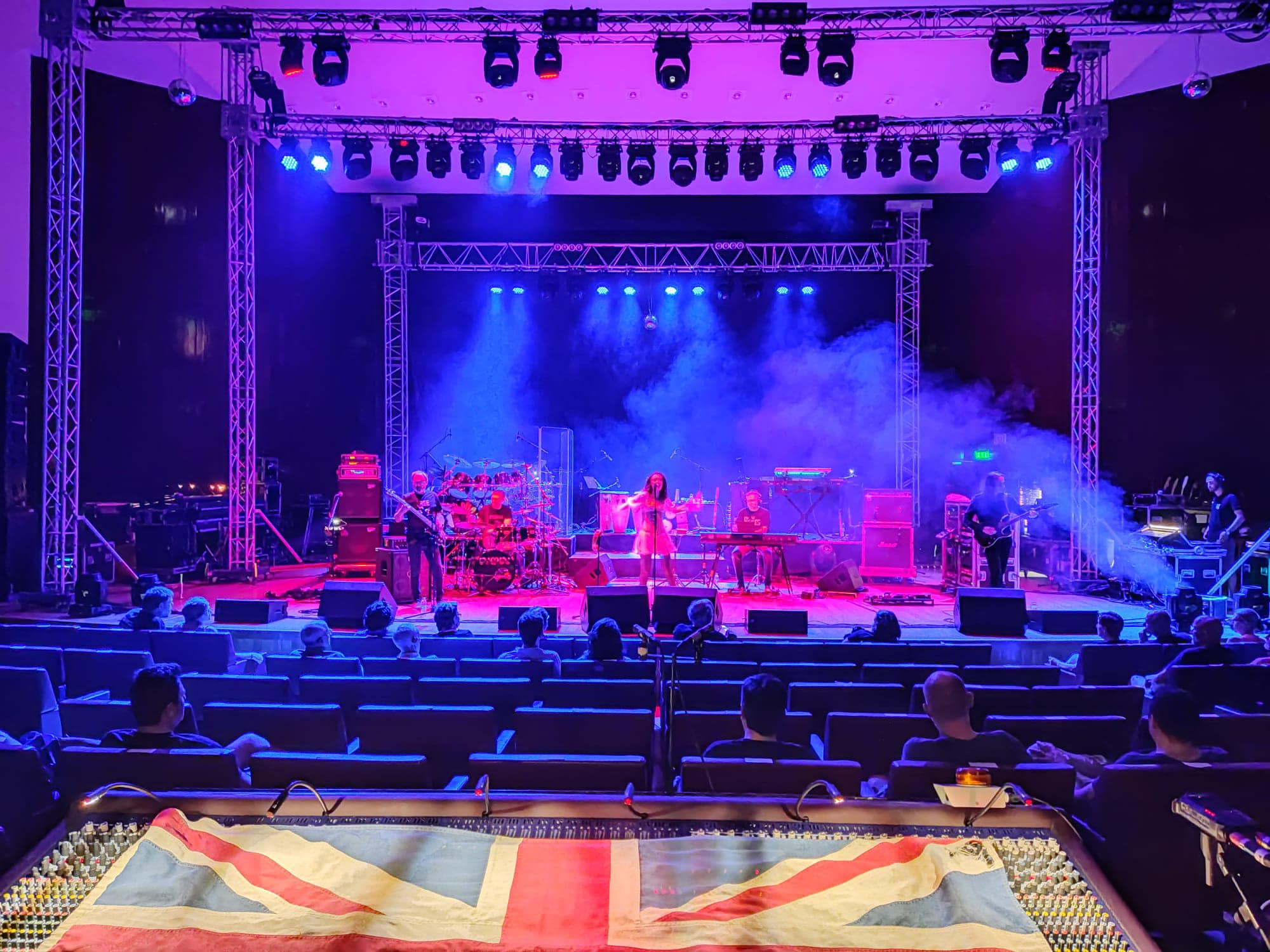
Numen en la Lisboa Marillion Weekend 2022

In 2019, its singer and guitarist leave the project to give way to Alba Hernández and Juanjo Herrera a new project that, according to what they have revealed on their official website and on social networks, will be a rock opera entitled "The outsider". To date they have released two singles from this fourth album, "Sophia" and "Toys". On the other hand, after the COVID break, they have resumed their live activity, highlighting their participation as the support band for Marillion in Lisbon (June 11, 2022) with Jorge Camarero as their new guitarist. This event served to review old themes and some of those that will be presented on the new album.

The Outsider (released in July 4th of 2025) is a conceptual opera that traces the emotional and spiritual journey of a man who has always lived on the margins—longing to belong, yet unable to betray his inner truth. The narrative unfolds from a childhood marked by silence and alienation, through years of inner conflict, spiritual awakening, and ultimately, personal liberation.

Musically and thematically, the work is enriched by the collaboration of Steve Rothery (of Marillion), whose atmospheric guitar textures lend voice to the protagonist’s longing and inner vastness, and Nacho Mañó (of Presuntos Implicados), whose warm, expressive bass lines and production sensibility bring emotional depth and clarity to the sonic landscape.

In the end, the Outsider stops chasing acceptance and instead embraces his difference as a source of strength. He emerges, not as someone who has found his place in the world, but as someone who has finally found peace within himself.

== Discography ==
- Albums:
1. Samsara (1998)
2. Numenclature (2014)
3. Cyclothymia (2019)
4. The Outsider (2025)
- EPs
1. The Outsider (2023)
2. Crib of Rarities (2023)

Other recordings:

- Birth (1995) (demo)

== Filmography ==
- Numenclature. A journey in progressive (2014)
