= Juggling 9 or Dropping 10 =

Juggling 9 Or Dropping 10

Studio album by Enchant
- Released: October 3, 2000
- Recorded: March 1 – May 18, 2000
- Genre: Progressive rock
- Label: InsideOut Music
- Producer: Douglas A. Ott

Enchant chronology
| Break (1998) | Juggling 9 Or Dropping 10 (2000) | Blink Of An Eye (2002) |

Professional ratings
Review scores
| Source | Rating |
|---|---|
| Allmusic | 2.5/5 stars |
| DPRP | 8.5/10 stars |

Juggling 9 or Dropping 10 is the fifth studio album by the neo-prog band Enchant. It was released in October 2000.

== Track listing ==
1. "Paint the Picture" (Ott) – 7:03
2. "Rough Draft" (Craddick, Ott) – 6:14
3. "What to Say" (Craddick, Leonard, Ott) – 4:19
4. "Bite My Tongue" (Craddick, Ott) – 5:41
5. "Colors Fade" (Craddick, Ott) – 5:25
6. "Juggling Knives" (Craddick, Leonard, Ott) – 5:03
7. "Black Eyes and Broken Glass" (Craddick, Ott) – 4:33
8. "Elyse" (Craddick, Leonard, Ott) – 5:47
9. "Shell of a Man" (Leonard, Ott) – 6:01
10. "Broken Wave" (Craddick, Ott) – 5:23
11. "Traces" (Craddick, Ott) – 7:19
12. "Know That" (Craddick, Leonard, Ott) – 1:27

== Personnel ==
- Ted Leonard – vocals; bass (track 3)
- Doug A. Ott – electric guitar (tracks 1–11), acoustic guitar (tracks 1–5, 7, 9, 12), keyboards (track 1, 2, 4, 8, 9), vocals (tracks 1, 4, 7, 12), bass (track 2, 4, 5, 7–11), E-bow (track 2, 4, 10), organ (tracks 3, 6, 7), strings (track 3), piano (track 5), Moog (tracks 5, 7), synthesizers (track 5), Mellotron (track 10), bass pedals (track 11)
- Mike "Benignus" Geimer – keyboard solo (track 6)
- Phil Bennett — keyboard solo (track 4)
- Ed Platt – bass (track 1)
- Paul Craddick – drums (tracks 1–11), organ (tracks 2, 4, 10, 11), pads (tracks 2, 3), keyboards (tracks 2, 5–8, 10), Mellotron (track 4), strings (tracks 4, 9, 11), harpsichord (track 5), acoustic guitar (track 5), percussion (track 6), bass (tracks 6, 11), electric guitar (track 6), bass pedals (track 9), Wurlitzer electric piano (tracks 10, 11), piano (track 11), vibes (track 11)

=== Production ===
- James Bickers – liner notes
- John Bartolucci – photography
- Stefan Beeking – photography
- Ernesto – narrator, chant
- Thomas Ewerhard – layout design
- Tom King-Size – engineer, mixing, drum engineering
- Ken Lee – mastering
