= Sucker Punch (Haji's Kitchen album) =

Studio album by Haji's Kitchen
- Released: 2001
- Recorded: 1999–2001
- Genre: Nu metal
- Length: 47:58
- Label: M Records
- Producer: Haji's Kitchen

Haji's Kitchen chronology
Haji's Kitchen (1995)	Sucker Punch (2001)	Twenty Twelve (2012)

Sucker Punch is the second studio album by the band Haji's Kitchen, released in 2001. It is the band's first and only album with former vocalist Vince Mullins.

There were three planned songs to make it on the album, which two of them were featured in Dragon Ball Z: Broly – The Legendary Super Saiyan. These songs being "Day after Day", "Lost", and "Notch". They ended up being featured on Haji's third and final album, Twenty Twelve.

== Track listing ==
1. "As Ever Beyond" – 4:30
2. "Son I Am" 3:51
3. "Sucker Punch" – 4:20
4. "Just Like Me" – 4:05
5. "Syncopated" – 3:58
6. "Return" – 3:49
7. "Take" – 4:03
8. "Medicated" – 4:15
9. "Nothin'" – 3:30
10. "Moon Song" – 3:32
11. "Cracker" – 3:57
12. "Face Down" – 4:03
