= Insignify =

Studio album by Rainburn
- Released: 7 November 2018
- Recorded: 2018
- Genre: Progressive rock
- Length: 48:06
- Label: Independent

Rainburn chronology
Canvas of Silence (2014)	Insignify (2018)

Insignify is the debut studio album by Indian progressive rock band Rainburn, released on 7 November 2018 and was mastered at Fascination Street Studios in Sweden. It is a concept album about "the search for identity, significance and purpose within the overarching meaninglessness of life."

== Background and promotion ==
After releasing the EP Canvas of Silence and touring to promote it, the band started to look for a label via which they could release the album.

In May 2017, the band released their first music video for "Merchant of Dreams". Also in 2017, the band mentioned a future debut album by the name of The Anthropic Conceit and which was expected to be funded by a campaign on Fuel a Dream and then succeeded by a tour. By 2018, however, the album was being promoted with the new and final title of Insignify.

On 1 October 2018, they released the video of "Suicide Note", a song inspired by a verse by Agha Shahid Ali ("I could not simplify myself.") and expressing "a desperate need to be understood while contemplating suicide, an irony because perhaps that need signifies that all hope isn't lost yet."

On November 6, the eve of the album's release, the band made it wholly available for listening on YouTube.

On December 5, the band released a lyric video for "Within", a track based on Hermann Hesse's Siddhartha. It features additional vocals from singer and podcast host Vidyaa Prakash and is considered a shifting point in the album, returning to the brighter sound of the album's first couple of songs, since it marks the point in the plot in which the protagonist has found "some semblance of inner peace".

== Concept ==
Inspiration for the album came from a lot of different sources that vocalist and guitarist Vats Iyengar read before production. He said the album is about the significance of life from the point of view of an artist (more precisely a musician) and deals with themes such as existentialism, narcissism, craving importance, insecurity and the search for reason. Iyengar, the main songwriter, wanted the album to "happen in an organic way".

Apart from Dream Theater, Pain of Salvation and Hindustani classical music, Johann Sebastian Bach is also an influence on the album, specifically on the track "Purpose", composed as a fugue.

=== Title ===
The band officially defines the album title as follows:

The word 'Insignify' is a portmanteau of two words:

(1) Signify: To symbolize something; to be an indication of

(2) Insignificance: Being unimportant; having no consequence

== Reception ==
Insignify was elected one of the best 2018 Indian albums by Rolling Stone India. David Britto wrote

[...] it doesn't take long to hear the band's diversity and exponential dynamics come through. [...] frontman Vats Iyengar portrays his angsty lyrics over the heavy ballad "Merchant of Dreams" and the Porcupine Tree leaning "Elusive Light." On "Purpose," the band present quite an interesting tune with a chunk of the track comprising only of a cappella vocal harmonies followed by the riff heavy fast-paced "Suicide Note." Things simmer down on the hopeful "Within" while the record closer "School of Atlantis" has a bluesy undertone with an enjoyable groove.

== Track listing ==
All lyrics are written by Vats Iyengar; all music is composed by Vats Iyengar, except "The Wait", co-written by Manu Shrivastava; and "Someone New", co-written by Praveen Kumar

No.	Title	Length
1.	"The Wait"	1:52
2.	"Merchant of Dreams"	6:15
3.	"Elusive Light"	6:36
4.	"Mirrors"	4:16
5.	"Someone New"	5:35
6.	"Purpose"	2:41
7.	"Suicide Note"	6:44
8.	"Insignify"	1:46
9.	"Within"	5:16
10.	"School of Atlantis"	7:05
Total length:		48:06

== Personnel ==
According to the album page at Bandcamp:

Rainburn

- Vats Iyengar – lead vocals, backing vocals, electric and acoustic guitars
- Ravi Nair – bass
- Praveen Kumar – drums, percussion

Guest performances

- Vidyaa Prakash – additional vocals on "Within"
- Gurekta Sethi – outro voiceover on "Mirrors"
- Toshimoa Jamir – final guitar solo on "Elusive Light"
- Yogeendra Hariprasad – keyboards on "Mirrors"
- Manu Shrivastava – piano, keyboards on "The Wait"
- Sidharth Bharadwaj – flute on "School of Atlantis"

Technical personnel

- Thejus Nair – mixing at Eleven Gauge Recordings
- Tony Lindgren – mastering at Fascination Street Studios
- Aaron Pinto / Kidsquidy – artwork
