= Haji's Kitchen (album) =

Studio album by Haji's Kitchen
- Released: 1995
- Recorded: 1994–1995
- Genre: Progressive metal, groove metal
- Label: Shrapnel
- Producer: Haji's Kitchen

Haji's Kitchen chronology
Haji's Kitchen (1995)	Sucker Punch (2001)

Haji's Kitchen is the debut studio album by the American band of the same name, released in 1995, via Shrapnel Records.

== Reception ==
While the album was well received by critics and sold well, 5000 copies total, there was some minor controversy surrounding the decision by Shrapnel Records, the band's label, to not issue more copies after the limited run of 5000 were sold.

This resulted in the band requesting to be dropped from the label, and voiding their three-record deal. This was a welcome change for the band, who hadn't received any royalty checks from the label.

== Track listing ==
1. "Machine" – 5:08
2. "Free" – 3:48
3. "Altered Mind" – 4:35
4. "2 in Me" – 4:49
5. "Images of Change" – 5:06
6. "Symptoms" – 3:51
7. "Near" – 6:22
8. "Time" – 5:04
9. "Quench" – 3:57
10. "Shed" – 3:50
