= Canvas of Silence =

EP by Rainburn
- Released: 31 October 2014
- Recorded: 2014
- Genre: Progressive rock
- Length: 27:55
- Label: Independent

Rainburn chronology
Canvas of Silence (2014)	Insignify (2018)

Canvas of Silence is the debut extended play by Indian progressive rock band Rainburn, released on 31 October 2014.

The band went through three line-up changes during the EP recording sessions: founding member and keyboardist Avik Chakravarty quit and was replaced by Ashwin Ethiraj, who quickly left too. The remaining members then decided to hire a second guitarist instead, Abhishek Prakash, who was also a very brief addition until he was replaced by Toshimoa Jamir. Also, they even ran out of money during the recording process.

Regarding the EP's music, drummer Praveen Kumar said the band "deliberately ventured on an experimental side", while vocalist Vats Iyengar saw some "subtle Indian elements". After the EP's release, they intended to tour in order to promote it and were also looking for a label via which they could release their debut full-length album.

== Reception ==
The Hindu described the EP as "a brilliant blend of opposing Indo-progressive tonalities that throb together in eclectic energy, exuding the band's vibrant take on music that is rooted and yet atmospheric." Classic Rock ranked it as the 4th best progressive rock album of 2015.

== Track listing ==
No.	Title	Length
1.	"Refuge"	5:23
2.	"Canvas of Silence"	5:38
3.	"Veil"	6:11
4.	"Time Turns Around"	2:59
5.	"Fragments"	7:44
Total length:		27:55

== Personnel ==
- Vats Iyengar – lead vocals, guitars
- Toshimoa Jamir – guitars
- Shishir Gupta – bass, backing vocals
- Praveen Kumar – drums
