= Blink of an Eye (Enchant album) =

Studio album by Enchant
- Released: July 23, 2002
- Genre: Neo-prog
- Label: InsideOut Music
- Producer: Douglas A. Ott

Enchant chronology
Juggling 9 or Dropping 10 (2000)	Blink of an Eye (2002)	Tug of War (2003)

Professional ratings
Review scores
Source	Rating
AllMusic	2/5 stars

Blink of an Eye is the sixth studio album by the American neo-prog band Enchant. It was released in July 2002.

== Track listing ==
1. "Under Fire" (Leonard, Ott) – 5:58
2. "Monday" (Leonard, Ott) – 7:10
3. "Seeds Of Hate" (Leonard, Ott) – 6:17
4. "Flat Line" (Ott) – 5:23
5. "Follow the Sun" (Ott) – 6:08
6. "Ultimate Gift" (Ott) – 7:58
7. "My Everafter" (Leonard, Ott) – 5:39
8. "Invisible" (Leonard, Ott) – 5:41
9. "Despicable" (Leonard, Ott) – 4:13
10. "Prognosis" (Bonus Track) (Ott) – 7:29

== Personnel ==
- Phil Bennett – Keyboard solos and additional keyboards on 'Seeds Of Hate', 'My Everafter' and 'Prognosis'
- Ted Leonard – vocals, additional guitar on 'Despicable'
- Douglas A. Ott – guitar and keyboards, bass on 'Follow The Sun'
- Ed Platt – bass guitar
- Sean Flanagan – drums
