= A Blueprint of the World =

Studio album by Enchant
- Released: 1993
- Genre: Neo-prog
- Length: 67:18
- Label: Dream Circle Records
- Producers: Douglas A. Ott & Paul A. Schmidt (tracks: 3, 5, 6, 9); Steve Rothery (tracks: 1, 2, 4, 7, 8)

Enchant chronology
A Blueprint of the World (1993)	Wounded (1996)

Professional ratings
Review scores
Source	Rating
AllMusic	3/5 stars

A Blueprint of the World is the debut studio album by the neo-prog band Enchant, released in 1993.

== Track listing ==
1. "The Thirst" (Ott) – 6:16
2. "Catharsis" (Benignus, Cline, Craddick) – 5:53
3. "Oasis" (Craddick, Ott) – 8:11
4. "Acquaintance" (Ott) – 6:31
5. "Mae Dae" (Benignus, Ott) – 3:24
6. "At Death's Door" (Cline, Craddick) – 7:16
7. "East of Eden" (Benignus, Cline, Craddick, Ott) – 5:50
8. "Nighttime Sky" (Craddick, Ott) – 8:57
9. "Enchanted" (Craddick, Ott) – 7:17
10. "Open Eyes" (Ott) – 7:43

== Personnel ==
- Paul Craddick – drums
- Ted Leonard – vocals
- Douglas A. Ott – guitar
- Ed Platt – bass guitar
- Mike "Benignus" Geimer – keyboards

=== Guest musicians ===
- Steve Rothery – plays Ebow on track 1, and guitar solo on track 8. He produced five tracks [1, 2, 4, 7, 8] and remixed two [3, 9].
