= Wounded (Enchant album) =

Studio album by Enchant
- Released: 1996
- Recorded: January 27 – July 1996
- Genre: Progressive rock
- Length: 63:27
- Label: Inside Out
- Producer: Douglas A. Ott

Enchant chronology
A Blueprint of the World (1993)	Wounded (1996)	Time Lost (1997)

Professional ratings
Review scores
Source	Rating
Allmusic	2/5 stars

Wounded is the second studio album by the neo-prog band Enchant, released in 1996 in Europe on Inside Out Music and 1997 in the US on Magna Carta Records.

== Track listing ==
1. "Below Zero" (Ott) – 6:07
2. "Fade 2 Grey" (Craddick, Ott) – 8:10
3. "Pure" (Craddick, Ott) – 7:17
4. "Broken" (Craddick, Leonard, Ott) – 7:44
5. "Hostile World" (Craddick, Geimer, Leonard, Ott, Platt) – 6:29
6. "Look Away" (Craddick, Geimer, Ott) – 6:40
7. "Armour" (Craddick, Ott) – 6:57
8. "Distractions" (Craddick, Leonard, Ott) – 7:27
9. "Missing" (Ott) – 6:36

== Personnel ==
Enchant

- Ted Leonard – vocals
- Douglas A. Ott – guitars, additional keyboards
- Mike "Benignus" Geimer – keyboards
- Ed Platt – bass
- Paul Craddick – drums; additional keyboards (track 4)

Additional musicians

- Phil Bennett — keyboards (tracks 1, 9)

== Production ==
- Douglas A. Ott – engineering, mixing
- Rick Geimer – artwork
- Ken Lee – mastering
