= Time Lost =

Studio album by Enchant
- Released: 1997
- Genre: Neo-prog
- Length: 50:05
- Label: InsideOut Music
- Producer: Douglas A. Ott

Enchant chronology
Wounded (1996)	Time Lost (1997)	Break (1998)

Professional ratings
Review scores
Source	Rating

Time Lost is the third studio album by the neo-prog band Enchant, released in September 1997.

== Track listing ==
1. "Blind Sided" (Craddick, Leonard) – 6:24
2. "New Moon" (Craddick, Geimer, Leonard, Ott) – 8:22
3. "Under the Sun" (Leonard, Ott, Platt) – 7:29
4. "Foundations" (Ott) – 6:08
5. "Interact" (Craddick, Geimer, Ott) – 10:49
6. "Standing Ground" (Cline, Craddick, Geimer, Pamfiloff) – 5:29
7. "Mettle Man" (Geimer, Ott) – 8:24

== Personnel ==
- Paul Craddick – drums
- Mike "Benignus" Geimer – keyboards
- Ted Leonard – vocals
- Douglas A. Ott – guitar
- Ed Platt – bass guitar
