= Lost time =

Traffic engineering term

Lost time is the term within traffic engineering for the time during which no vehicles are able to pass through an intersection despite the traffic signal displaying a green (go) signal. The total lost time is the sum of two separate elements: start-up lost time and clearance lost time. Start-up lost time happens when a traffic signal changes from red (stop) to green (go). Some amount of time elapses between the signal changing from red to green and the first queued vehicle moving through the intersection. There is then an additional amount of time for the next vehicle to begin moving and pass through the intersection, and so on. The total time taken for all waiting drivers to react and accelerate is the start-up lost time. Clearance lost time is the time lost to stopping a line of vehicles at the end of a green phase. Lost time is always measured in seconds.

Start-up lost time can be calculated as the sum of the differences between the headways for the first cars in line and the average headway through the intersection at a theoretical maximum flow, the saturation flow rate. When no observations have been made, the start-up lost time is assumed to be 2.0 seconds as a default value.

Since clearance lost time is often not observable since observation requires that some vehicles which were waiting at the start of a green phase still be waiting when the green phase ends, it is typically determined through the equation $l_2 = y + ar - e$, where $\mathit{l}_2$ is the clearance lost time, $y$ is the yellow time, $ar$ is the all-red interval time during which the traffic signal is red for all directions, and $e$ is the portion of the yellow and all-red times during which vehicles are illegally in the intersection and has a default value of 2.0 seconds in HCM. ALDOT's Traffic Signal Design Guide and Timing Manual, on the other hand, determines clearance lost time to be half of the yellow interval plus the entire all-red interval.

In order to find out how clearance lost time can be calculated see and. In this study, clearance lost time was measured in the field and compared with the default values specified in HCM and ALDOT's manual.
