= Psykerion =

Studio album by Thought Chamber
- Released: October 2, 2013
- Genre: Progressive metal
- Length: 64:00
- Label: InsideOut Music

Psykerion is the second album by the progressive metal band Thought Chamber. The album is the first new album in 6 years for the band, due to the other parties involvements in other projects, such as Ted Leonard performing with Spock's Beard. The album is composed of many instrumental interludes and contains 16 songs. The album touches on a scientific twist into their lyrics. The album is also the first to feature new members Bill Jenkins on keyboards, Jeff Plant on bass and Mike Haid on drums. Psykerion is a concept album. Michael Harris stated: "The story is told from the eyes of a young boy genius named Avakus. He is able to witness a mission aboard a ship (Kerakryps-One) through the galaxy of Psykerion, and his life is forever altered, causing him to reflect on and question his own life, as well as the objectives & destiny of mankind".

== Track listing ==
1. "Inceptus" – 2:40
2. "Exodus" – 1:47
3. "Psykerion: The Question" – 3:02
4. "In the Words of Avakus" – 1:52
5. "Light Year Time" – 5:33
6. "Kerakryps" – 5:27
7. "The Black Hole Lounge" – 1:08
8. "Circuits of O.D.D." – 1:54
9. "Behind the Eyes of Ikk" – 8:36
10. "Isle of Bizen" – 4:34
11. "Xyrethius II" – 4:30
12. "Recoil" – 3:17
13. "Breath of Life" – 3:04
14. "Transcend" – 9:38
15. "Planet Qwinkle" – 4:41
16. "Inner Peace" – 2:07

== Personnel ==
- Ted Leonard – vocals
- Michael Harris – guitars, keyboards, vocals
- Jeff Plant – bass
- Mike Haid – drums
- Bill Jenkins – keyboards
