= Blade Guitars =

Swiss manufacturer

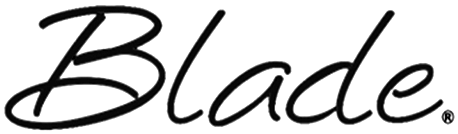
- Industry: Musical instrument
- Founded: 1987; 39 years ago
- Founder: Gary Levinson
- Products: Electric guitars, bass guitars
- Website: bladeguitars.com

Blade Guitars is a manufacturer of electric guitars and bass guitars founded by luthier Gary Levinson in 1987. Levinson had been repairing guitars since 1964 and, in 1977, during his graduate studies at the University of Basel, Switzerland, he founded Guitars by Levinson. Using the experience he gathered from his work, he decided to start Blade Guitars in 1985. By 1986, he was refining the idea of a line of guitars based on the concept he defines as "Classic Design, Creative Technology"; at this time, he was also determining the features that would characterize his range of guitars. In January 1987, a manufacturing deal was reached for the production of the guitars. Blade Guitars made their debut in October 1987, at the music show of Tokyo. Their presentation at the Frankfurt Musikmesse in 1988 signalled their European launch.

== Design & types ==
The main concept behind the design of Blade Guitars is "Classic Design, Creative Technology"; from this, it would be sensible to infer that a significant portion of their range is inspired by well-established electric guitar and bass designs. Indeed, most of their designs are based on the Fender Stratocaster and Telecaster, with some discreet modifications in their electronics and construction to provide a broader tonal palette and improved playability, respectively. Among these modifications, compared to the original designs, are:

1. Falcon Tremolo (double block system that also allows uptrem while sitting flat on the guitar body, maintains tune)
2. Variable Spectrum Control (an onboard active off/cut/boost preamplifier/3-band EQ system)
3. Contoured neck heel (Blade calls it a tapered neck joint)
4. Truss rod adjustment at the body end of the neck, beneath a plastic cover (as opposed to vintage Fender designs, where the pickguard has to be removed)
5. 22-fret fingerboards.
6. Adjustable tension guide (Sprung tensioner on headstock, improvement over string tree)
7. Sperzel locking tuners (Trimlock, matched set - declining in height from low E to prevent excessive movement on post)
8. Spring steel roller saddle (as opposed to non-ferrous die cast)

=== Classic Series ===
These models can be classified as Superstrats, although their design does not include features popular in this genre, such as pointier body horns, deeper cutaways a double-locking vibrato. They are equipped with locking tuners, an HSS pickup configuration, a graphite nut and the VSC active preamp/EQ. Furthermore, their controls consist of one volume potentiometer (with coil-split for the bridge humbucker) and a master tone potentiometer.

=== Texas Series ===
The models of this series are quite faithful to the classic Strat design. Some of these guitars feature the VSC preamp, others feature a variable mid boost, while some feature strictly passive electronics. Also, most of these guitars have an SSS pickup configuration.

=== Delta Series ===
Inspired by the Fender Telecaster, but with the VSC preamp.

=== Dayton ===
Retro-styled guitars with passive electronics.

=== XF Series ===
A series of three Superstrat-style guitars with 24-fret necks, HH or HSH pickup configurations. The XF-230 Titan is equipped with Floyd Rose-licensed vibrato.

=== Durango Series ===
The current lineup of this series seems to be inspired by the designs of PRS Guitars. All models in this range have an HH pickup configuration; one of them is equipped with the VSC preamp..

=== Player Series ===
Low-cost versions of the Texas, Delta, Dayton, XF and Durango series.

=== Basses ===
Blade also produces a range of electric basses inspired by the Fender Jazz Bass, available in 4 & 5-string versions.

== Notable Blade players ==
- Phil Manzanera
- Steve Rothery
- Stuart Adamson
- Baiju Dharmajan
- Nick McCabe
- Rise Kagona
- Wong Ka Kui (1988-1991)
