= Steve Rothery =

English guitarist (born 1959)

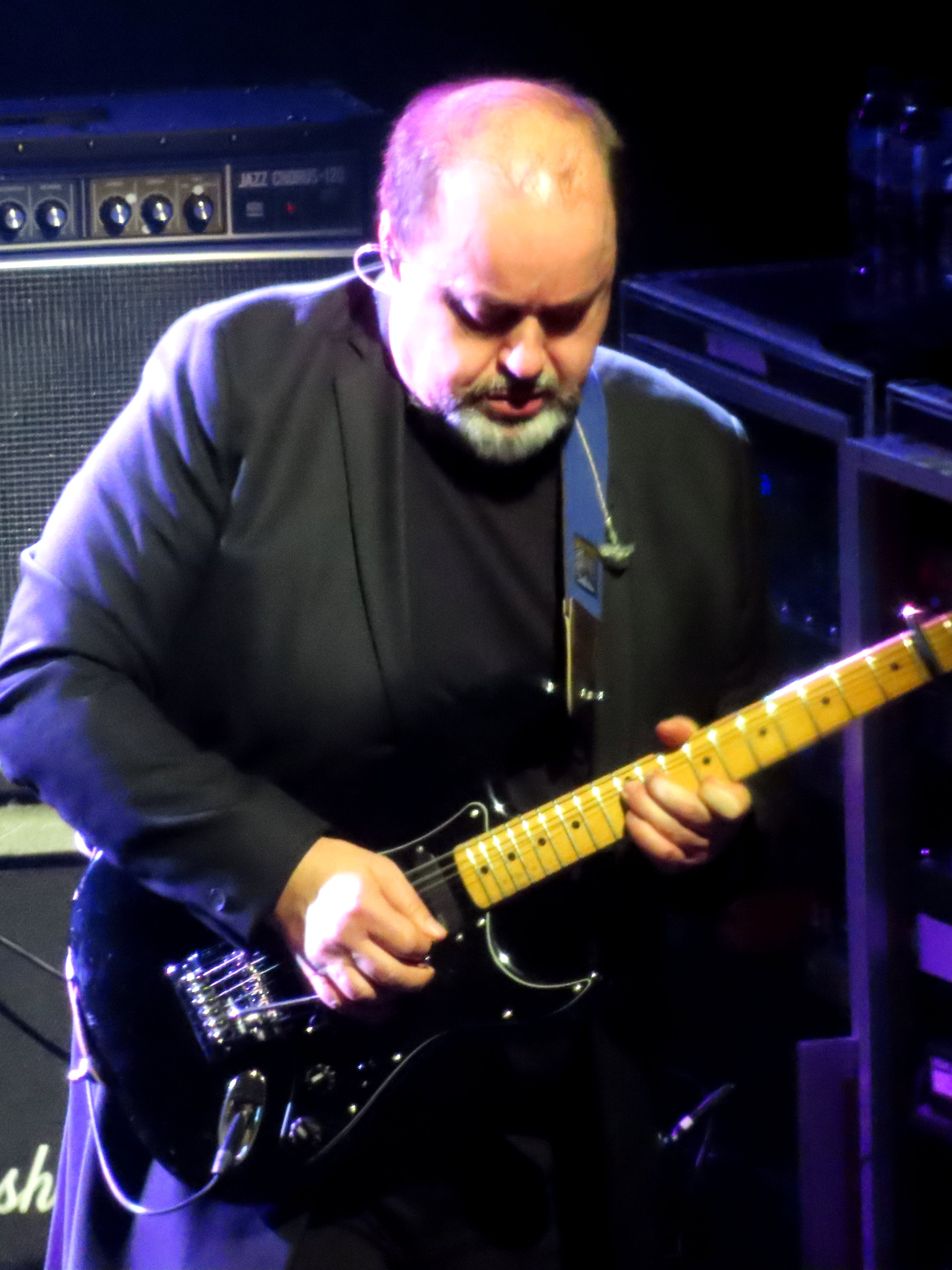
- Rothery performing with Marillion in 2021

Background information
- Born: 25 November 1959 (age 66); Brampton Bierlow, Barnsley, West Riding of Yorkshire, England
- Genres: Rock; progressive rock; neo-prog
- Occupations: Musician; songwriter
- Instrument: Guitar
- Years active: 1979–present
- Member of: Marillion; The Wishing Tree
- Website: steverothery.com

Steven Rothery (born 25 November 1959) is an English musician who is the original guitarist and the longest continuous member of the progressive rock band Marillion. Outside Marillion, Rothery has recorded two albums as part of the duo the Wishing Tree as well as an instrumental solo album, The Ghosts of Pripyat, released in September 2014. He also founded the British Guitar Academy in 2011.

== Biography ==
Rothery was born in Brampton Bierlow, near Barnsley then in the West Riding of Yorkshire, England, and from the age of six he lived in Whitby, North Yorkshire. He began to play the guitar at the age of 15. In an interview for Johnnie Walker's Sounds of the Seventies on BBC Radio 2 in 2013, Rothery revealed that his musical tastes always differed from his friends, who were getting into punk rock while he preferred progressive rock, which he had been introduced to through the Alan Freeman show on BBC Radio 1.

=== Marillion ===
In 1979, he saw an ad in the music press for a band called Silmarillion that needed a guitarist. He auditioned successfully for the band (19 August 1979). Later, Silmarillion shortened its name to Marillion.

=== Outside Marillion ===
==== The Wishing Tree ====
As well as work with Marillion, he started a solo project under the name the Wishing Tree (with vocalist Hannah Stobart), and released two albums titled Carnival of Souls (1996) and Ostara (2009).

==== The British Guitar Academy ====
In 2011, Rothery launched the British Guitar Academy "to bring together some of Britain's top guitarists to pass on their hard won knowledge and experience to a wider audience through a series of workshops and masterclasses. The aim is to concentrate not just on technique but also creativity and individuality."

==== Solo album The Ghosts of Pripyat (2014) ====
Rothery had been approached by EMI to make a solo album during the recording of Marillion's Misplaced Childhood (1985) and by Miles Copeland when Marillion were recording Brave in his castle in France in 1994; he decided to join with Stobart and form The Wishing Tree instead.

On 25 November 2013, Rothery announced that he was working on a solo album to be titled The Ghosts of Pripyat and scheduled for a September 2014 release. The album's production was financed via the crowdfunding platform Kickstarter and quickly reached almost double its target by 17 December. The idea for the album was born when Rothery was rehearsing for a show at the annual international guitar festival in Plovdiv, Bulgaria, in October 2013, with a band including guitarist Dave Foster (of Mr. So & So), drummer Leon Parr (formerly of Mosque), and bassist Yatim Halimi (of Panic Room). An audio recording of the show was made available as a download from Rothery's website as a first impression of the forthcoming album's direction, followed by a CD in February 2014. Steve Hackett (ex-Genesis) appears on two tracks and Steven Wilson on one. The album's cover was designed by Lasse Hoile. The finished album was released on 22 September 2014.

==== Bioscope ====
Bioscope is a collaborative project from Rothery and electronic composer Thorsten Quaeschning from Tangerine Dream. Rothery had guested with Tangerine Dream in 2022. Their first public performance as a duo (not named Bioscope yet) took place at the Marillion Weekend in Berlin on 22 June 2023. The debut album Gentō was released two years later, on 22 August 2025.

== Influences and style ==
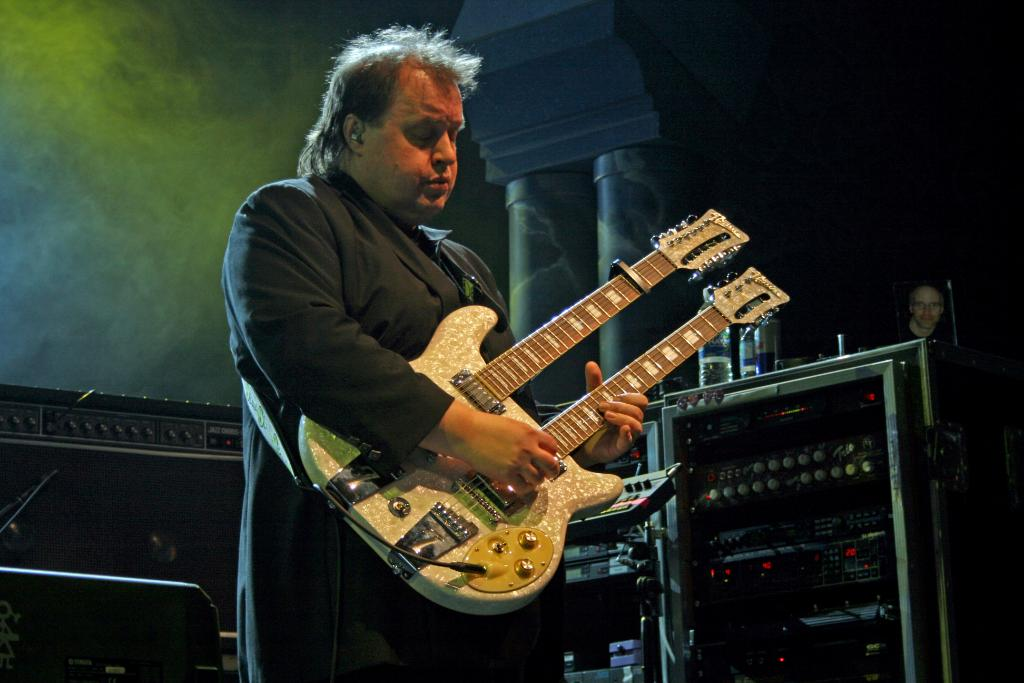
Rothery with Marillion at their 2009 weekend festival in Montreal, Canada

Rothery has described his own style on the guitar as a mix of Andrew Latimer, Steve Hackett, and David Gilmour. He has also cited Joni Mitchell as an influence, especially her use of open tunings, which he believed created a very harmonically rich sound. He has cited Mitchell's "A Case of You" as one of the songs that had the biggest influence on him. Rothery added: "I was also really influenced by George Harrison—the lesson there being to play just what's right for the song." According to Rothery: "When I was growing up, I was always drawn to players who had an atmospheric and emotional quality to their sound... I think the guitar has the power to communicate emotionally more than any other instrument, and you're short-changing yourself if you focus on technique at the cost of emotion. You have to listen with your heart, as well as your ears."

Barry Cleveland of Guitar Player stated that Rothery "specializes in crafting lush sonic atmospheres with layered guitars and effects processing". Rothery was hailed by Scott Kahn, the Editor in Chief & CEO of the website MusicPlayers.com, as one of the great progressive rock guitarists, comparing him favourably with John Petrucci, David Gilmour and Alex Lifeson. Kahn described him as "an incredibly talented player", whose tone "is sure to appeal to fans of diverse guitar sounds", with "guitars drenched in shimmering chorus, sparkling delays and cavernous reverbs", "spacey sounds and blues sections" as well as "acoustic rhythms that anchor the melodies." Kahn identified Rothery as having "three distinct trademark sounds": a "sparkling clean arpeggio tone draped in digital delays", "soaring melodic lead tones" and a "classic blues tone." Kahn said Rothery was "never one to go for major flash, he always plays for the song and not his ego, but when he shines, he shines brightly."

Rothery's process for creating his guitar solos is improvisation. He was quoted: "That has always been the way I've done things, and some of my favourite leads—such as 'Sugar Mice', 'Easter', and the last break in 'This Strange Engine'—were composed on the spot."

In 2001, Rothery was voted Yorkshire and Humberside's best guitarist in a poll in Total Guitar magazine with 65% of the vote, beating David Bowie's Ziggy Stardust-era guitarist Mick Ronson into second place.

=== Equipment ===
In the 1980s, Rothery used various guitars, including a Yamaha SG-2000 and Fender or Squier Strats. For amps, he employed Marshall amps, for overdriven sounds, and Roland Jazz Chorus 120 amps for more effects laden sounds. When interviewed in 2010, he mentioned using a Blade Stratocaster-style guitar with Lindy Fralin pickups, and a signature model by luthier Jack Dent. His guitars are equipped with MIDI. He makes extensive use of loops, via a setup that includes TC Electronic 2290 Dynamic Digital Delays, an AdrenaLinn III, and a variety of other effects all routed through controller made by Gig-Rig.

On 8 November 2017, Rothery was presented with his new Blade RH-4 signature guitar by guitar manufacturer Gary Levinson at a promotional event in the Albert Halls in Bolton.

== Discography ==
=== with Marillion ===
Steve Rothery appears on every Marillion release since their 1982 debut single; see Marillion discography

=== with the Wishing Tree ===
- Carnival of Souls (1996)
- Ostara (2009)

=== Solo ===
- Live in Plovdiv (December 2013)
- Live in Rome (August 2014)
- The Ghosts of Pripyat (September 2014)

=== with Steve Hackett ===
- The Roaring Waves (2026, Hackett & Rothery)

=== Guest appearances ===
- Jadis – Jadis (1989, production)
- Arrakeen – Patchwork (1990, guitar)
- Rock Against Repatriation – "Sailing" (1990, guitar)
- Enchant – A Blueprint of the World (1993, production, guitar)
- John Wesley – Under the Red and White Sky (1994, guitar)
- Arena – Crying for Help, The Cry (1994, guitar)
- Mr. So and So – The Overlap (1998, production, guitar)
- John Wesley – The Emperor Falls (1999, guitar)
- Ian Mosley & Ben Castle – Postmankind (2001, guitar)
- The Reasoning – Awakening (2007, guitar)
- Gazpacho – Firebird (2005, guitar)
- Swallow the Sun – Servant of Sorrow (alternate version from the single New Moon) (2009, guitar)
- Edison's Children – In The Last Waking Moments (2011, guitar)
- Steve Hackett – Genesis Revisited II (2012, guitar)
- Riccardo Romano Land – B612 (2017, guitar)
- Steve Hackett – Broken Skies Outspread Wings (2018, guitar)
- Mark Kelly – Mark Kelly's Marathon (2020, guitar on Puppets)
- Collage - Over and Out (2022, guitar)
- Numen – The Outsider (2025, guitar on White Lies)
- Steve Hackett - The Lamb Stands Up Live at the Royal Albert Hall (2025, guitar on Fly on a Windshield)
