= Tug of War (Enchant album) =

Studio album by Enchant
- Released: August 5, 2003
- Genre: Progressive rock, progressive metal
- Length: 65:32
- Label: InsideOut Music
- Producer: Douglas A. Ott

Enchant chronology
Blink of an Eye (2002)	Tug of War (2003)	Live at Last (2004)

Professional ratings
Review scores
Source	Rating
Allmusic	3/5 stars
DPRP	9.5/10 stars

Tug of War is the seventh studio album by the American neo-prog band Enchant. The live bonus track was recorded at NEARfest 2002 in Trenton, New Jersey.

== Track listing ==
1. "Sinking Sand" (Leonard, Ott, Platt) – 7:08
2. "Tug of War" (Ott) – 7:41
3. "Hold the Wind" (Leonard, Ott, Platt) - 5:44
4. "Beautiful" (Ott) – 4:27
5. "Queen of the Informed" (Leonard, Ott) – 7:01
6. "Living in a Movie" (Jenkins, Ott) – 6:58
7. "Long Way Down" (Leonard, Ott) – 4:57
8. "See No Evil" (Leonard) – 5:52
9. "Progtology" (Ott) – 6:48
10. "Comatose" (Ott) – 8:50
11. "Below Zero (Live)" – 6:28 Bonus track on Special Edition

== Line-up ==
- Ted Leonard – vocals and all guitars on 'See No Evil' (Except for the last solo)
- Douglas A. Ott – guitars, piano on 'Comatose', mellotron on 'Progtology' and strings on 'Beautiful'
- Ed Platt – bass guitar
- Sean Flanagan – drums
- Bill Jenkins – keyboards
