= The Wishing Tree (band) =

British folk rock project

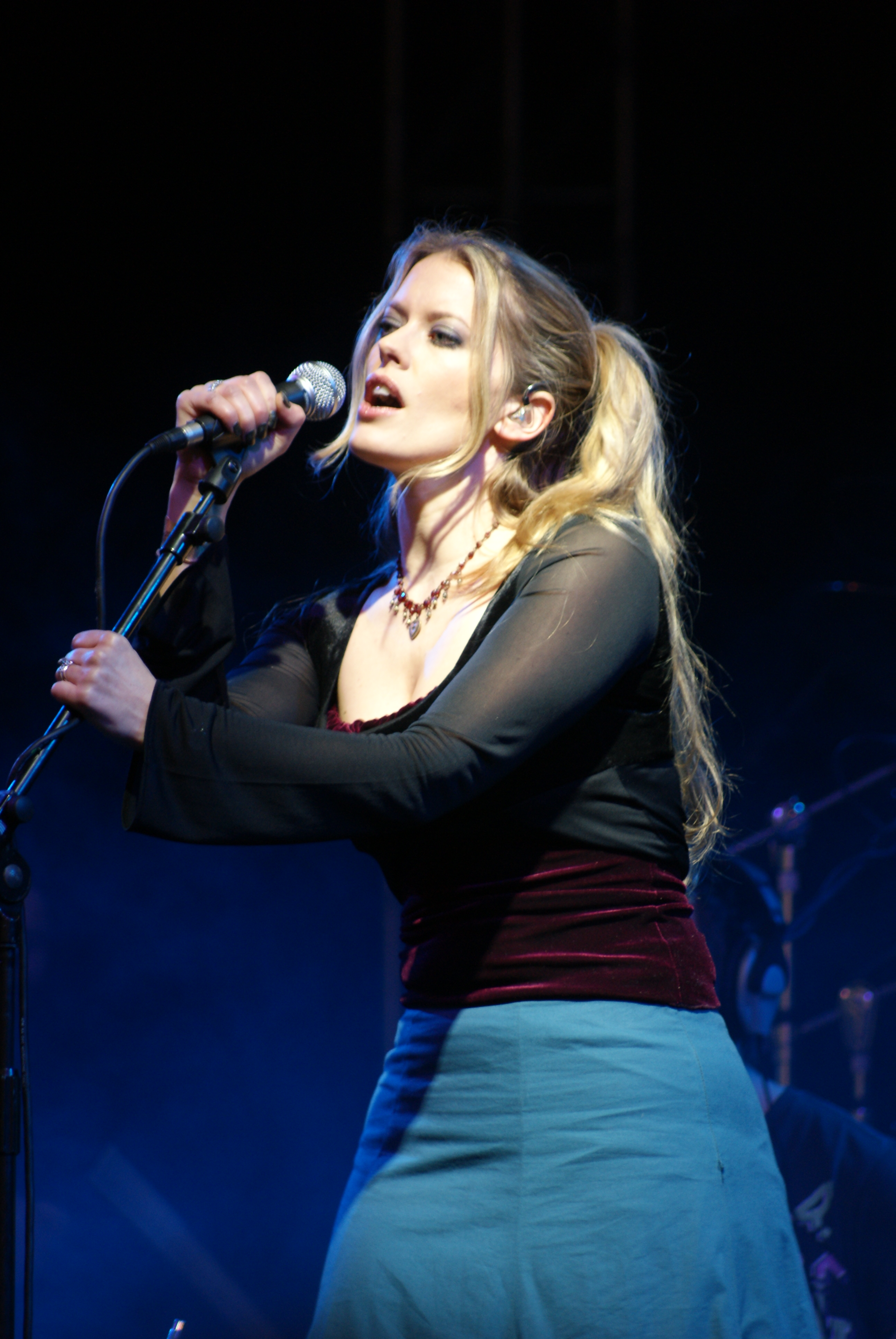
- Hannah Stobart at the Marillion Weekend 2009

Background information
- Origin: United Kingdom
- Genre: Folk rock
- Years active: 1995–present (intermittently)
- Labels: Dorian Music, Racket Records (Intact)
- Spinoff of: Marillion; Enchant
- Members: Hannah Craddick (née Stobart); Steve Rothery
- Website: myspace.com/thewishingtreeband thewishingtree.com (currently not live)

The Wishing Tree is a music project by Marillion guitarist Steve Rothery and vocalist Hannah Stobart. Their debut album, Carnival of Souls, was released in 1996 and a second album, Ostara, was released 23 March 2009.

== History ==
Rothery had been interested in starting an acoustic project with a female vocalist since 1985. Rothery's first consideration to be the vocalist was Julianne Regan, the lead singer of the gothic rock group All About Eve. Later, an attempt to team up with the female singer of a band called The Escape Club (not The Escape Club), whose voice reminded Rothery of Annie Haslam's, failed as they couldn't get along on a personal level. When Marillion were recording Brave at Miles Copeland's Chateau Marouatte in Dordogne in 1993, Copeland offered Rothery "a substantial sum" for recording an instrumental solo album on his label No Speak. Although Rothery didn't take the offer, it renewed his interest in a solo project.

During the Brave tour of 1994, Rothery was approached by Hannah Stobart, a student of French and Italian, who gave him her demo tape containing "She Moved Through the Fair" and Tori Amos's "Me and a Gun". Rothery was delighted and began recording further demos with Stobart at his new home studio. After Marillion were dropped by EMI following the 1995 album Afraid of Sunlight, several band members pursued solo projects before they began work on This Strange Engine (1997). During two weeks in early 1996, Rothery recorded acoustic material with Stobart on vocals, Pete Trewavas of Marillion on bass and Paul Craddick of Enchant on drums and keyboards. All music was written by Rothery and Stobart ("additional vocal melodies"), while the lyrics were written by regular Marillion collaborator John Helmer. Most songs were written right then, however, a handful had a longer history: "Nightwater" was considered for Seasons End (1989), when Steve Hogarth rejected Helmer's lyrics as "too gothic"; the chorus of "Midnight Snow" and "Evergreen" were written during the Holidays in Eden (1991) and Clutching at Straws (1987) sessions, respectively.

The resulting album was called Carnival of Souls, after the horror film of the same title. The project's name was inspired by Tengiz Abuladze's film The Wishing Tree (a.k.a. The Tree of Desire). There was no tour to support the album, however, the band did appear live on a concert for Marillion's Italian fan club. They also appeared on Italian television.

After the release of Carnival of Souls, Rothery returned to his main job with Marillion, leaving The Wishing Tree on an indefinite hiatus. Stobart finished her university studies, married Paul Craddick and settled down in California as a journalist. In 1999, Sony Music expressed interest in another Wishing Tree album, so Rothery and Stobart/Craddick recorded some demos that Rothery described as "a cross between Portishead and Alanis Morissette". However, Rothery hesitated to sign a major deal outside of Marillion and Sony finally lost interest. Still, Rothery and Stobart continued to work together. In 2002, the band played at a fan club convention ("Marillion Weekend").

The Wishing Tree's second album Ostara was released on 23 March 2009 through marillion.com. The first 1000 copies were signed by Steve and Hannah. One of the tracks from the album, "Hollow Hills", was prereleased for download from their webpage, along with other clips from the album.

Hannah and Paul Craddick also started the project Rocket Moth, and released the album Mesolow in 2013.

== Members ==
=== Official members ===
- Hannah Craddick – vocals (1995–present)
- Steve Rothery – guitar, keyboards, bass (1995–present)

=== Contributors ===
- Paul Craddick – drums, keyboards (1996–present)
- Pete Trewavas – bass (1996)
- Jo Rothery – backing vocals (1996–present)
- Mike Hunter – keyboards, percussion (2009)

== Discography ==
- 1996 - Carnival of Souls
- 2009 - Ostara
