= Ted Leonard =

American vocalist and guitarist (born 1971)

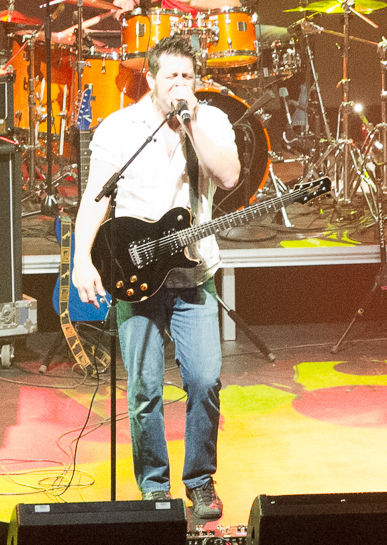
- Ted Leonard with Enchant at ROSFest, 2015

Background information
- Born: Theodore Michael Leonard; September 22, 1971 (age 55); Arcadia, California, US
- Origin: San Francisco
- Genres: Progressive rock; neo-prog; progressive metal; Christian rock
- Occupations: Musician; singer
- Instruments: Vocals; guitar
- Years active: 1989–present
- Label: InsideOut Music
- Member of: Enchant; Spock's Beard; Thought Chamber; Pattern-Seeking Animals
- Formerly of: Transatlantic

Theodore Michael Leonard (born September 22, 1971) is an American vocalist and guitarist, best known as the lead singer for the progressive rock band Enchant and Spock's Beard. He has also provided lead vocals for Thought Chamber and Pattern-Seeking Animals as well as backing vocals, guitars, and keyboards for the 2014 and 2022 Transatlantic live tours.

Leonard's influences include Paul Rodgers, Doug Pinnick/King's X, Jellyfish, Steve Walsh/Kansas, Yes, Rush, Tears for Fears, Neal Morse, Steve Perry, and Queensrÿche.

== Discography ==
=== Solo albums ===
- Way Home (2007)

=== Enchant ===
- A Blueprint of the World (1993)
- Wounded (1996)
- Time Lost (1997)
- Break (1998)
- Juggling 9 Or Dropping 10 (2000)
- Blink of an Eye (2002)
- Tug of War (2003)
- Live at Last (2004)
- The Great Divide (2014)

=== Spock's Beard ===
- Live at High Voltage Festival (2011)
- Brief Nocturnes and Dreamless Sleep (2013)
- The Oblivion Particle (2015)
- Noise Floor (2018)
- The Archaeoptimist (2025)

=== Thought Chamber ===
- Angular Perceptions (2007)
- Psykerion (2013)

=== Xen ===
- 84.000 Dharma Doors (1999)

=== Affector ===
- Harmagedon (2012)

=== Andrew Gorczyca ===
- Reflections – An Act of Glass (2009)

=== Transatlantic ===
- KaLIVEoscope (2014)
- The Final Flight: Live at L'Olympia (2023)
- Live at Morsefest 2022: The Absolute Whirlwind (2024)

=== Neal Morse ===
- Jesus Christ the Exorcist (2019)
- The Dreamer – Joseph: Part One (2023)
- The Restoration – Joseph: Part Two (2024)

=== Ryo Okumoto ===
- The Myth of the Mostrophus (2022)

=== Pattern-Seeking Animals ===
- Pattern-Seeking Animals (2019)
- Prehensile Tales (2020)
- Only Passing Through (2022)
- Spooky Action at a Distance (2023)
- Friend of All Creatures (2025)
- Grimalkin (2026)

=== Alan Morse ===
- So Many Words (2026)
