= Ostara (album) =

Studio album by The Wishing Tree
- Released: 11 March 2009 (MP3 download), 23 March 2009 (physical release and FLAC download)
- Genre: Folk rock
- Label: Racket Records
- Producer: Steve Rothery

The Wishing Tree chronology
Carnival of Souls (1996)	Ostara (2009)

Ostara is the title of the second album by The Wishing Tree, a project by Marillion's guitarist Steve Rothery and singer Hannah Stobart. The album was produced and engineered by Rothery and mixed by Michael Hunter, who also produced the two most recent Marillion albums. Hunter also contributed additional keyboards and percussion. The artwork is by Spanish artist Antonio Seijas, who had created the artwork for Marillion's Happiness is the Road (2008). Rothery's wife Jo and daughter Jennifer are credited for additional backing vocals and cover design, respectively. The drummer is Hannah's husband Paul Craddick (of Enchant).

== Track listing ==
1. "Ostara" – 5:16
2. "Easy" – 5:26
3. "Hollow Hills" – 6:21
4. "Seventh Sign" – 5:43
5. "Falling" – 5:55
6. "Fly" – 4:41
7. "Kingfisher" – 4:16
8. "Soldier" – 5:36

Total time 43:14 All songs written by Steve Rothery/Hannah Stobart. All lyrics by Stobart.

== Personnel ==
- Hannah Stobart – Lead & Backing Vocals
- Steve Rothery – Lead/Rhythm/Acoustic Guitars; Bass Guitars; Keyboards

With:

- Paul Craddick - Drums
- Mike Hunter - Additional keyboards & percussion
- Jo Rothery - Additional backing vocals
