= Haji's Kitchen =

American heavy metal band

- Origin: Lewisville, Texas, U.S.
- Genres: Progressive metal; groove metal; nu metal
- Years active: 1992–present
- Labels: Shrapnel Records (1995); M Records (2001); Unsigned (1992–1994, 1996–2000, 2002–present)
- Members: Eddie Head; Derek Blakley; Rob Stankiewicz; Brett Stine
- Past members: Clint Barlow; Eddie Ellis; Vince Mullins; Scott Stine; Daniel Tompkins
- Website: hajiskitchen.com

Haji's Kitchen, sometimes shortened to just Haji, is an American metal band from Lewisville, Texas. Formed in 1992, the band members themselves uncertain, they take influences from early heavy metal and modern progressive rock, and they have also drawn comparisons to Alice in Chains and Pantera.

== History ==
=== Early history and breakthrough ===
The first "known" incarnation of Haji's Kitchen was formed in 1992/1993 by founding members Eddie Head, Brett Stine, Derek Blakley, and Clint Barlow (now with Vanilla Ice). Though there were earlier incarnations of the band, their history has been tracked back to the point when they first played live, as stated by Blakley on the band's MySpace.

According to Blakley, the band's name was decided when Clint Barlow walked into the rehearsal room where Eddie was eating his lunch, and upon smelling the Indian food, which in the words of Blakley "has a rather pronounced odor", stated, "Damn...it smells like Haji's Kitchen in here" and the band name was born.

Shortly after Brett Stine left in 1995, his brother Scott joined the band, and they started receiving complaints that their CD was too hard to find to purchase. This was because Shrapnel Records, the first label they were signed to, had produced a limited run of only 5000 CDs and refused to print any more copies.

=== Mid-history ===
Upon leaving Shrapnel Records due to the very limited release of their debut album, Haji underwent another lineup change. Creative differences began to erupt with Eddie Ellis and after he failed to show up for a gig in Lubbock, Texas, he was kicked out of the band. In response, Vince Mullins was hired on vocals as a replacement. This newly formed line-up proceeded to release their 2001 album Sucker Punch with the local independent label M Records. Sucker Punch was leaning towards a more nu metal sound unlike their first album.

In 2003, Haji's songs Day After Day and Lost were featured in the Dragon Ball Z feature film Dragon Ball Z: Broly – The Legendary Super Saiyan with a third, Notch unreleased. However, shortly after the debut of the new songs, the band went into extended hiatus in late 2003 due to singer Vince Mullins getting kicked out for undisclosed reasons. They remained without a vocalist until recruiting Daniel Tompkins in 2011.

=== Later events ===
On February 9, 2010, Haji's Kitchen posted on their MySpace page that the band has gone back into the studio and recorded drums for the first time in at least 7 years. It was also the first the time in 10 years since the Sucker Punch sessions that Haji's Kitchen has recorded anything with intent to distribute. As for the lineup, guitarist Brett Stine has rejoined Haji's Kitchen.

In February 2011, Daniel Tompkins (Tesseract, Skyharbor, First Signs of Frost, Piano, In Colour) was named the new "full-time guest vocalist".

Haji's Kitchen released their first new material in a decade on October 9, 2011. The single "Define the Lie" was released to major music distributors such as iTunes and Amazon. They released the music video on November 12, 2011.

Their third full-length studio album Twenty Twelve was released on June 19, 2012. It contains six vocal tracks with Daniel Tompkins, one new instrumental song and instrumental versions of the six vocal tracks.

Former vocalist Vincent Mullins died on October 6, 2016, from stage-four melanoma. He was 44.

== Members ==
=== Current ===
- Brett Stine – rhythm and lead guitar (1993–1995, 2009–present)
- Derek Blakley – bass guitar (1993–present)
- Rob Stankiewicz – drums (1994–present)
- Eddie Head – rhythm and lead guitar (1993–present)

=== Former ===
- Eddie Ellis – vocals (1994–1998; missing since 1999)
- Vincent Mullins – vocals (1999–2003; died 2016)
- Scott Stine – guitar (1997–1999)
- Clint Barlow – drums (1993–1994)
- Daniel Tompkins – vocals (session vocals on Twenty Twelve)

== Discography ==
- Haji's Kitchen (1995)
- Sucker Punch (2001)
- Twenty Twelve (2012)
