= Ostara (band) =

British folk music band

- Genres: Folk-pop; neofolk; post-punk
- Years active: 1991-present
- Spinoff of: Strength Through Joy
- Members: Richard Leviathan; Stu Mason; Tim Desmond; Dave Renwick
- Past members: Timothy Jenn (left in 2001)
- Website: https://ostara.net/

Ostara is a British folk music group, "described in the musical press as a neo-folk / pop music hybrid", founded by Richard Leviathan (born Richard Levy) and Timothy Jenn, as a change of name and stylistic direction from their previous band, Strength Through Joy. Jenn left the band in 2001. Guitarist Stu Mason, drummer Tim Desmond, and former Bronski Beat/Communards bassist Dave Renwick left the band in 2010, as work was due to start on a new album. Leviathan is now the only member of the band. Finnish musician Kari Hatakka, known as the singer of the band Waltari, played synthesizers on some Ostara tracks.

== Discography ==
=== Albums ===
- Secret Homeland (2000)
- Kingdom Gone (2002)
- Ultima Thule (2003)
- Immaculate Destruction (2005)
- The Only Solace (2009)
- Paradise Down South (2014)
- Napoleonic Blues (2017)
- Eclipse of the West (2020)
- Age of Empire (2023)

=== EPs ===
- Whispers of the Soul (2001)
