= Enchant (band) =

American neo-progressive rock band

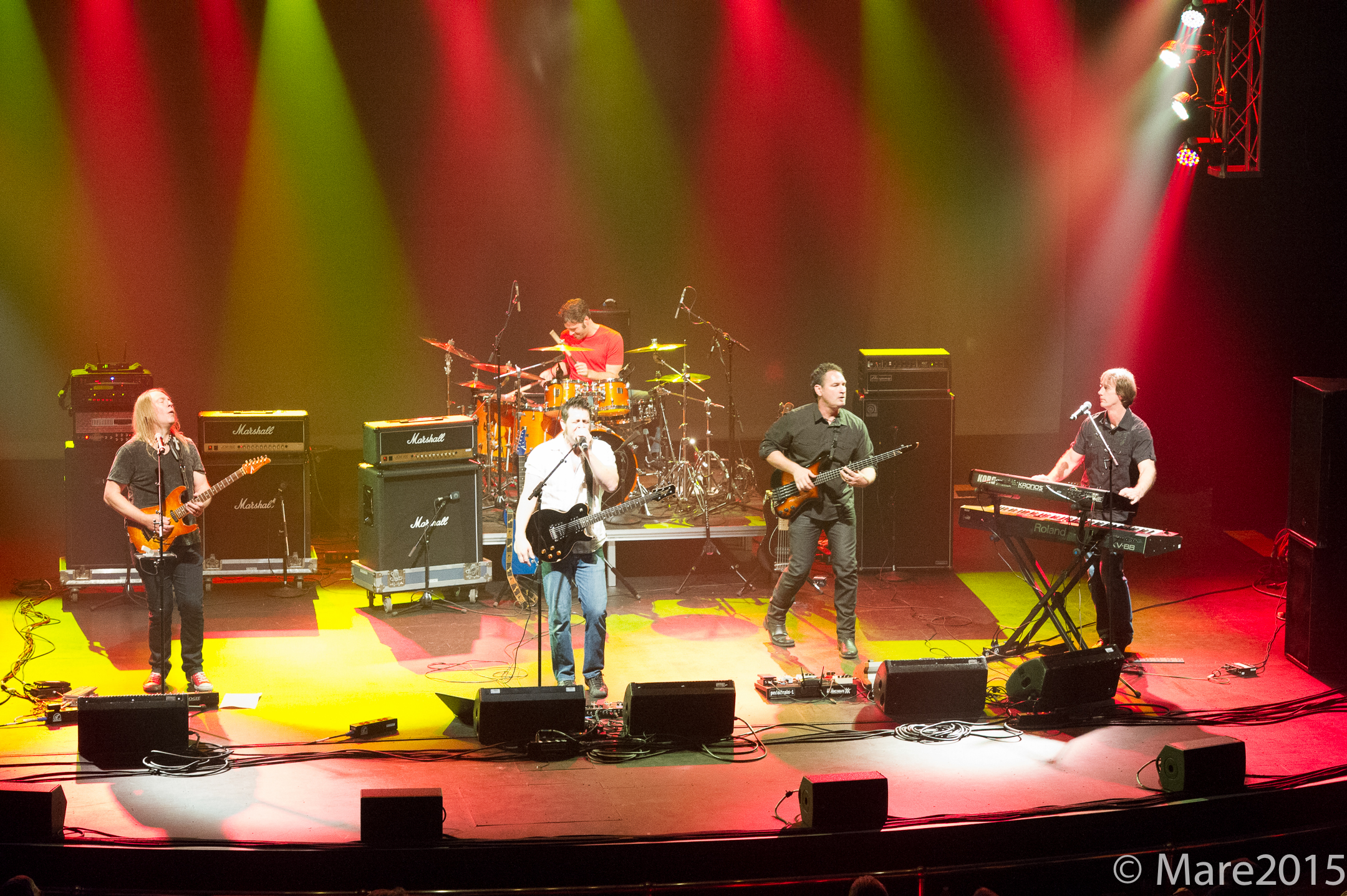
- Enchant - Headlining ROSFest in 2015

Background information
- Origin: San Francisco, United States
- Genres: Progressive rock, neo-prog, progressive metal, symphonic rock
- Years active: 1989–present
- Label: InsideOut
- Members: Doug Ott; Ed Platt; Ted Leonard; Sean Flanegan; Bill Jenkins
- Past members: Paul Craddick; Michael "Benignus" Geimer; Phil Bennett; Brian Cline
- Website: Official website

Enchant is an American neo-prog band, formed in 1989. Their music is characterized by ambitious lyrics and melodies along with harmonic and rhythmic experimentation.

== History ==
Enchant's origins reach back to the end of the 1980s when the band was known as Mae Dae. In 1993 they went into the studio to record "A Blueprint of the World". This was produced by Paul A Schmidt. The band, unhappy with the production, called on Steve Rothery of Marillion to help co-produce the record with Douglas Ott and Paul Craddick. Rothery added some guitars and remixed some songs. A small German label, Dream Circle, had secured the rights for this album. The band toured Europe in 1993, and the album was later re-released with an extended booklet and a second disc with demos from their first album.

Wounded (1996) helped them attract new fans. Time Lost (1997) was released for a tour with Dream Theater. It had four new tracks and previously unreleased material. Break (1998) was promoted live on stage with Spock's Beard and later with Marillion. These albums marked a departure from their first album.

Juggling 9 or Dropping 10 was released in 2000. Two band members left after the album was finished. Blink of an Eye and Tug of War reinforced the band's status as a serious band. These albums opened the band's road for touring in Germany together with Spock's Beard and the California Guitar Trio. Their live album, Live at Last was released as a double CD and a double DVD set, with over 20 songs some dating back to 1993.

The band, after a long break, recorded a new album titled The Great Divide which was released in 2014.

== Lineup ==
Current members

- Doug Ott – guitars, backing vocals, occasional bass and keyboards (1989–present), lead vocals (1989–1991)
- Ted Leonard – lead vocals, occasional guitars and bass (1991–present)
- Ed Platt – bass (1991–1997, 2000–present)
- Sean Flanagan – drums, percussion (2002–present)
- Bill Jenkins – keyboards, backing vocals (2003–present)

Former members

- Paul Craddick – drums, occasional keyboards, bass and guitars (1989–2002)
- Mike "Benignus" Geimer – keyboards (1989–2000)
- Brian Cline – bass, lead and backing vocals (1989–1991)
- Phil Bennett – keyboards (2000–2002 session)

Timeline

== Discography ==
=== Studio albums ===
- A Blueprint of the World (1993)
- Wounded (1996)
- Time Lost (1997)
- Break (1998)
- Juggling 9 or Dropping 10 (2000)
- Blink of an Eye (2002)
- Tug of War (2003)
- The Great Divide (2014)
- A Dream Imagined Box Set (2018) The complete collection 1994 - 2014)

=== Live albums ===
- Live at Last (2004)

== Videography ==
- Live At Last (2004)
