= Reality Dream =

Live album by Riverside
- Released: 26 November 2008
- Recorded: 2008
- Genre: Progressive rock Progressive metal
- Producer: Riverside

Riverside chronology
Rapid Eye Movement (2007)	Reality Dream (2008)	Anno Domini High Definition (2009)

Reality Dream is a live album by Polish progressive rock band Riverside. Its two discs contain live performances of tracks from the Reality Dream Trilogy, which includes Rapid Eye Movement, Out of Myself and Second Life Syndrome. All the lyrics were written by bassist-vocalist Mariusz Duda.

== Track listing ==
Disc 1
No.	Title	Length
1.	"The Same River"	11:31
2.	"Out of Myself"	3:39
3.	"Volte-Face"	8:47
4.	"Rainbow Box"	3:36
5.	"02 Panic Room"	4:09
6.	"I Turned You Down"	5:05
7.	"Reality Dream III"	4:57
8.	"The Curtain Falls"	9:38

Disc 2
No.	Title	Length
1.	"Parasomnia"	7:45
2.	"Second Life Syndrome"	16:13
3.	"Back to the River"	6:15
4.	"Conceiving You"	3:39
5.	"Before"	6:08
6.	"Ultimate Trip"	13:46

== Personnel ==
- Mariusz Duda – vocals, bass, acoustic guitar
- Piotr Grudziński – guitar
- Michał Łapaj – keyboards
- Piotr Kozieradzki – drums
