= Memories in My Head =

EP by Riverside
- Released: 20 June 2011 (Europe); 28 June 2011 (North America)
- Recorded: 2011
- Studio: Serakos Studio, Warsaw, Poland
- Genre: Progressive rock
- Length: 32:36
- Label: ProgTeam Management (Poland); Glassville Records (Europe); The Laser's Edge (North America)
- Producer: Riverside; Magda and Robert Srzedniccy

Riverside chronology
| Anno Domini High Definition (2009) | Memories in My Head (2011) | Shrine of New Generation Slaves (2013) |

Professional ratings
Review scores
| Source | Rating |
|---|---|
| Allmusic | 3/5 stars |
| Sputnikmusic | 2/5 stars |

Memories in My Head is the second EP by Polish progressive rock band Riverside. It was initially only available for sale at concerts on the band's 10th anniversary tour in 2011, before being released to the general public on 20 June in Europe and 28 June in North America.

== Background ==
Memories in My Head was recorded to celebrate the band's 10th anniversary, with music that was intended to reflect the style of the band's first two albums. It was recorded, mixed and mastered at Serakos Studio in Warsaw, Poland by the band, along with Magda and Robert Srzednicki. As with all of the band's previous releases up until that point, art direction was handled by Travis Smith.

The EP was initially only made available for sale at concerts on the band's European tour in May 2011. It was release to the general public in Europe on 20 June 2011 by GlassVille Records, and in North America on 28 June 2011 by The Laser's Edge.

Prior to the EP's release, the song "Forgotten Land" was used in the promotion of the upcoming video game The Witcher 2: Assassins of Kings. A music video for the song was released in August 2011.

== Track listing ==
All lyrics are written by Mariusz Duda; all music is composed by Riverside.

| No. | Title | Length |
|---|---|---|
| 1. | "Goodbye Sweet Innocence" | 10:40 |
| 2. | "Living in the Past" | 11:59 |
| 3. | "Forgotten Land" | 9:57 |
| Total length: | | 32:36 |

== Personnel ==
Riverside

- Mariusz Duda – lead vocals, bass, acoustic guitar
- Piotr Grudziński – guitar
- Piotr Kozieradzki – drums
- Michał Łapaj – keyboards, organ, theremin

Production

- Riverside – production
- Magda Srzedniccy – production, mixing
- Robert Srzedniccy – production, mixing
- Grzegorz Piwkowski – mastering
- Travis Smith – art direction
