= 02 Panic Room =

Single by Riverside

from the album Rapid Eye Movement
- Released: 10 June 2007
- Studio: Serakos Studio, Warsaw
- Genre: Progressive rock, Progressive metal
- Length: 18:21
- Label: Mystic Production; InsideOut Music
- Songwriters: Mariusz Duda, Piotr Grudziński, Michał Łapaj, Piotr Kozieradzki
- Producers: Riverside; Magda; Robert Srzedniccy

Riverside singles chronology
"Conceiving You" (2005)	"02 Panic Room" (2007)	"Schizophrenic Prayer" (2008)

"02 Panic Room" is a single by Polish progressive rock band Riverside. It was released on 15 June 2007 as the first single from the album Rapid Eye Movement, which was released on 8 October 2007.

== Background ==
This release features four tracks, and was released on the large prog rock label InsideOut Music.

The EP continues with the more raw and heavy feel, as first seen on Second Life Syndrome. The third track, Back to the River, borrows the "Syd's Theme" motif from Pink Floyd's, "Shine On You Crazy Diamond", featured at the 4:32-mark.

It cost 5 zł (ca 1.2 eur). It was certified gold by Polish Society of the Phonographic Industry.

== Track listing ==
All lyrics are written by Mariusz Duda; all music is composed by Riverside (Mariusz Duda, Piotr Grudziński, Michał Łapaj, Piotr Kozieradzki)

No.	Title	Length
1.	"02 Panic Room"	3:54
2.	"Lucid Dream IV"	4:34
3.	"Back to the River"	6:30
4.	"02 Panic Room" (Remix)	3:23

== Personnel ==
- Mariusz Duda – vocals, bass guitar, acoustic guitar
- Piotr Grudziński – guitars
- Michał Łapaj – keyboards
- Piotr Kozieradzki – drums
- Travis Smith – cover art
