= Lunatic Soul (album) =

Studio album by Lunatic Soul
- Released: October 16, 2008
- Recorded: 2008
- Genre: Progressive rock
- Length: 46:53
- Label: Kscope
- Producer: Mariusz Duda, Robert Srzednicki

Lunatic Soul chronology
Lunatic Soul (2008)	Lunatic Soul II (2010)

Lunatic Soul is the first solo album by Lunatic Soul, the solo project of Polish vocalist and multi-instrumentalist Mariusz Duda, vocalist and bass guitarist of prog-rock band Riverside. The album was released on October 13, 2008, by the Kscope label.

The album does not feature any electric guitar parts. Guest appearances on the album include then-UnSun and Indukti drummer Wawrzyniec Dramowicz, as well as Michał Łapaj, the keyboardist of Duda's main band, Riverside.

The recordings reached the 23rd position on the Polish OLiS chart. Lunatic Soul was voted Best Album of the Year by listeners of the Noc Muzycznych Pejzaży radio show.

Reviewers described the album as “forty-five minutes of moving, meticulously thought-out music.” They also noted the oriental-ambient sound of the project as being distinctive from the music of Mariusz Duda's primary band Riverside. The German magazine Eclipsed rated the album 9/10 and described Lunatic Soul as “trip rock.”

The first Lunatic Soul album is, as its creator says, “a concept album about a journey through the afterlife, filled with reflections on transience and on what we want – or whether we even want – to leave behind.” The inspiration for such a concept album was an event that took place in the life of someone close to Mariusz Duda. This person experienced clinical death and shared with the artist what he had gone through in that state, which became the starting point for telling a story about a journey through the afterlife.

== Track listing ==
All songs written by Mariusz Duda, except where noted.

No.	Title	Writer(s)	Length
1.	"Prebirth"		1:10
2.	"The New Beginning"		4:50
3.	"Out on a Limb"		5:27
4.	"Summerland"	Mariusz Duda, Maciej Szelenbaum	5:00
5.	"Lunatic Soul"		6:47
6.	"Where the Darkness Is Deepest"	Mariusz Duda, Maciej Szelenbaum	3:57
7.	"Near Life Experience"	Mariusz Duda, Maciej Szelenbaum	5:27
8.	"Adrift"		3:05
9.	"The Final Truth"		7:34
10.	"Waiting for the Dawn"	Mariusz Duda, Maciej Szelenbaum	3:36

== Personnel ==
- Mariusz Duda – vocals, voices, bass, acoustic guitar, kalimba, percussion, effects
- Maciej Szelenbaum – piano, keyboards, flute
- Wawrzyniec Dramowicz – drums, percussion
- Michał Łapaj – Hammond organ, keyboards - tracks 5 & 9
- Maciej Meller – EBow - track 8
- Anna Maria Buczek – tears - track 3
