= Fractured (Lunatic Soul album) =

Studio album by Lunatic Soul
- Released: October 6, 2017
- Recorded: 2016–2017
- Studio: Serakos Studio, Warsaw, Poland
- Genre: Progressive rock
- Length: 55:34
- Label: Kscope; Mystic Production
- Producer: Mariusz Duda; Robert Srzednicki; Magda Srzednicka

Lunatic Soul chronology
Walking on a Flashlight Beam (2014)	Fractured (2017)	Under the Fragmented Sky (2018)

Singles from Fractured
- 1. "Fractured" Released: July 27, 2017

Professional ratings
Review scores
Source	Rating
Classic Rock	3.5/5 stars
Gitarzysta	10/10 stars
laut.de	4/5 stars
Louder Than War	7/10
Metal.de	8/10
Ultimate Guitar	9/10

Fractured is the fifth studio album by Lunatic Soul. The album was released on October 6, 2017 by Kscope.

== Background ==
Fractured marks a shift away from sounds and styles explored on previous Lunatic Soul releases. Mariusz Duda commented on the album shortly after its release:

“Lunatic Soul has changed and if I were to describe this music, I’d call it dark melancholic trance with more electronics and more powerful sounds. But there will also be some lyrical fragments, and a couple of tracks will feature a symphonic orchestra I have worked with for the first time in my career. The new Lunatic Soul album will be brave, rich and musically very intense, a beginning of a new style rather than a continuation of the previous releases. I am under the impression that all my music experiences have led me to this place and that it will be one of the best albums I have ever made.“

— Mariusz Duda

The album was recorded and released following the death of both Riverside co-founder and guitarist Piotr Grudziński as well as Duda's father in 2016. In contrast to the previous Lunatic Soul album Walking on a Flashlight Beam, described by Duda in 2017 as one of the darkest albums he had ever recorded, Fractured has been described as more 'positive' than previous releases. Duda has stated that the main theme of Fractured is 'coming back to life after a personal tragedy', and that he wanted to create an album with a positive undertone which would suggest how to cope with loss, as well as inspire to overcome fear. He has also stated that in addition to reconciliation of loss, Fractured also deals with societal and social media division in an era of political movements such as the election of Donald Trump, Brexit, and Catalan secession.

During the writing process, Duda scrapped over thirty minutes of music initially written in the same style as previous Lunatic Soul albums, including a long intro track and several ballads, after deciding that he instead wanted to create music he felt was more powerful, self-confident and dynamic. Writing album opener "Blood on the Tightrope" served as a watershed moment for the album's composition, helping Duda set the album's more electronic tone. However Duda decided to keep two songs already recorded with the Sinfonietta Consonus Orchestra, citing the cost already spent. Under the Fragmented Sky, a supplemental album to Fractured, was released seven months later in 2018, consisting of these unreleased leftover tracks.

In a 2020 interview, Duda described how he sees Lunatic Soul's music fitting into a 'circle of life and death', with Fractured, along with the previous album Walking on a Flashlight Beam, and the end of the subsequent album Under The Fragmented Sky, falling onto the side of life due to their more electronic instrumentation.

== Recording ==
Fractured was mostly recorded between June 2016 and June 2017 in Serakos Studio in Warsaw, with additional recording of the Sinfonietta Consonus Orchestra for two tracks ("Crumbling Teeth and The Owl Eyes" and "A Thousand Shards of Heaven") taking place on 13 and 14 October 2016 in Custom 34 Studio in Gdańsk. In a 2017 interview, Duda stated that the idea for including an orchestra came from conversations with conductor Michal Mierzejewski, where after expressing interest in collaborate with Riverside, Duda instead proposed to collaborate on what would become Fractured. Duda later admitted that he recorded with the orchestra before he realized he wanted the direction of the album to be more electronic.

== Track listing ==
No.	Title	Length
1.	"Blood on the Tightrope"	7:20
2.	"Anymore"	4:37
3.	"Crumbling Teeth and the Owl Eyes"	6:41
4.	"Red Light Escape"	5:44
5.	"Fractured"	4:36
6.	"A Thousand Shards of Heaven"	12:18
7.	"Battlefield"	9:05
8.	"Moving On"	5:14

== Personnel ==
Credits adapted from the Lunatic Soul website.

Lunatic Soul

- Mariusz Duda - music, lyrics, keyboards, bass guitar, acoustic guitar, piccolo bass guitar, percussion, programming, lead vocals, backing vocals

Additional personnel

- Wawrzyniec Dramowicz - drums
- Marcin Odyniec - saxophone (tracks 4, 6, and 9)
- Sinfonietta Consonus Orchestra - orchestra (tracks 3 and 6)
  - Michal Mierzejewski - conductor
  - Julia Ziętek - first violin
  - Karolina Gutowska - first violin
  - Martyna Kopiec - first violin
  - Judyta Sawicka - first violin
  - Katarzyna Libront - first violin
  - Paulina Kuśmierska - first violin
  - Magdalena Szczypińska - second violin
  - Karolina Janiak - second violin
  - Anna Gospodarek - second violin
  - Tomasz Chyła - second violin
  - Gabriela Żmigrodzka - second violin
  - Krzysztof Jakob Szwarc - viola
  - Maciej Rogoziński - viola
  - Ewelina Bronk-Młyńska - viola
  - Eliza Falkowska - viola
  - Weronika Kulla - cello
  - Alicja Różycka - cello
  - Katarzyna Kamińska - cello
  - Damian Wdziękoński - contrabass
  - Joanna Kożuch - management

Production

- Mariusz Duda - producer, mixing
- Michał Mierzejewski - orchestral arrangements
- Magda Srzednicki - producer, recording, mixing, mastering
- Robert Srzednicki - producer, recording, mixing, mastering
- Jakub Mańkowski - recording (orchestra)
- Łukasz Kumański - recording (orchestra)
- Rob Palmen - management

Design

- Travis Smith - illustration, design, layout
- Oskar Szramka - photography
