= Lunatic Soul =

Polish progressive rock project

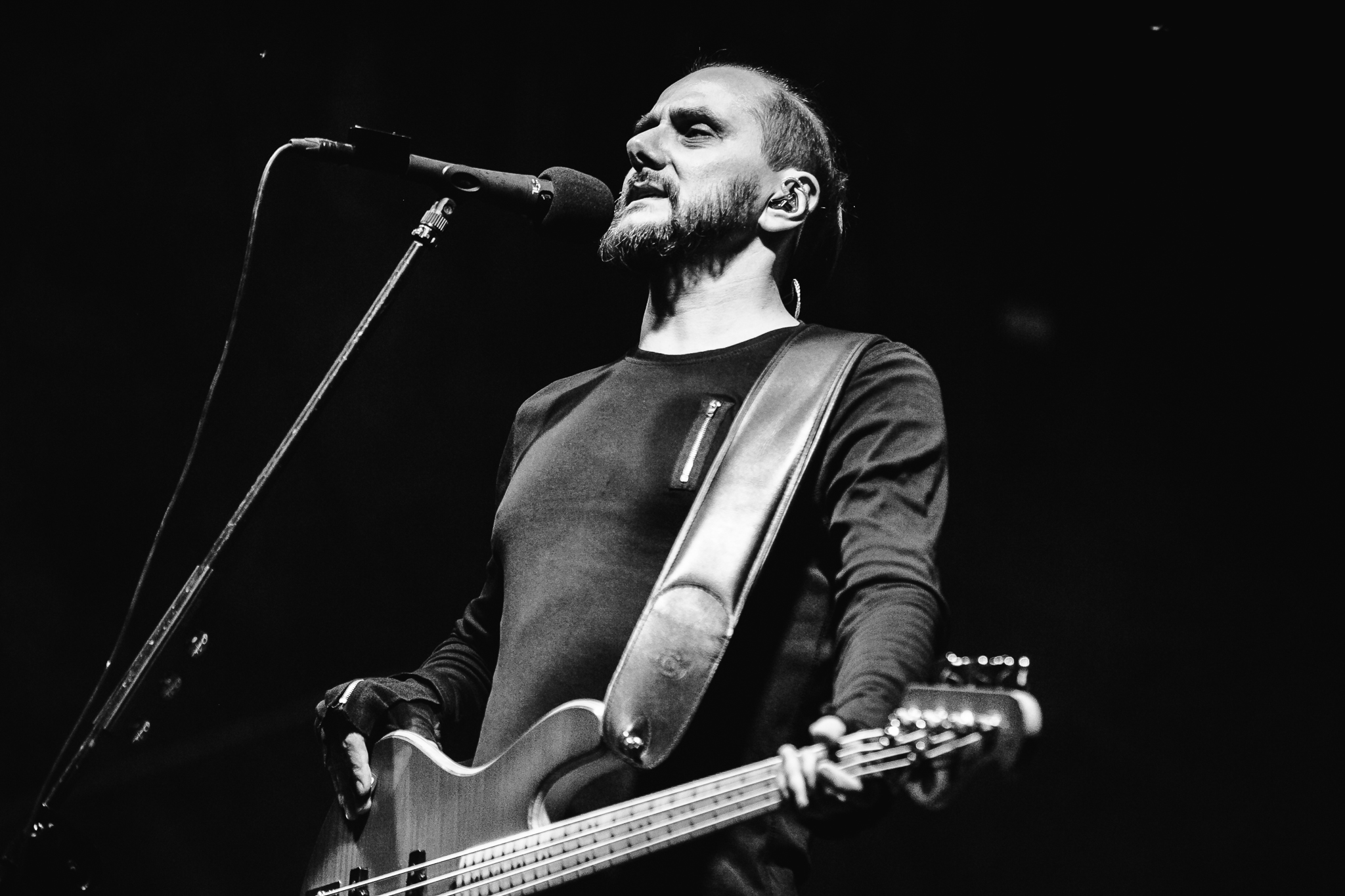
- Mariusz Duda (Lunatic Soul) performing with Riverside in 2019

Background information
- Origin: Poland
- Genres: Progressive rock
- Years active: 2008–present
- Labels: Mystic; Snapper; Kscope
- Members: Mariusz Duda
- Website: lunaticsoul.com

Lunatic Soul is a progressive rock side-project founded by Riverside vocalist and bass guitarist Mariusz Duda in 2008. Originally conceived to allow him to explore genres outside of rock, the project was described by Duda in 2014 as progressive, ambient, oriental, and electronic. Lunatic Soul has released eight albums to date. The most recent, The World Under Unsun, came out in October 2025.

== Albums ==
=== 2008: Lunatic Soul ===
Lunatic Soul's debut, self-titled studio album was released on 13 October 2008 on Kscope. Guest appearances included then-UnSun and Indukti drummer Wawrzyniec Dramowicz as well as Riverside keyboardist Michał Łapaj.

The record reached No. 23 on the Polish OLiS chart and was voted Best Album of the Year by listeners of the Noc Muzycznych Pejzaży radio program.

Reviewers described it as "forty-five minutes of moving, meticulously thought-out music", noting the oriental-ambient sound of the project as distinctive from the music of Duda's primary band, Riverside. The German magazine Eclipsed rated the album 9/10 and described the music as "trip rock".

=== 2010: Lunatic Soul II ===
The projects's second album, titled Lunatic Soul II, was released on 25 October 2010 by both Mystic Production and Kscope, debuting at No. 13 on the OLiS chart in Poland. Reviewers compared the music to such artists as Dead Can Dance and Peter Gabriel.

Music critics pointed out that Lunatic Soul II is more musically accessible than the debut and includes more melodic content. They placed emphasis on Duda's continued experimentation, expressed through the use of unconventional instruments, such as the Chinese guzheng, tubular bells, the cajón, and the kalimba.

=== 2011: Impressions ===
On 17 October 2011, Kscope released Lunatic Soul's third album, titled Impressions, the project's first entirely instrumental record. The tracks were created during the recording sessions for the previous two albums and were initially intended to be an addition to the reissues of those albums. Duda ultimately felt that the compositions were strong enough to stand as a separate record.

When asked why the album was instrumental, Duda explained: "I grew up mainly on instrumental music. I had to have such an album in my discography". The tracks on Impressions include a range of non-musical sounds, such as an electrocardiogram, falling water droplets, and steel being forged. Duda's voice is rarely present and functions more as an additional instrument than as traditional vocals.

=== 2014: Walking on a Flashlight Beam ===
Lunatic Soul's fourth album, titled Walking on a Flashlight Beam, was released on 13 October 2014 by Mystic Production in Poland and Kscope worldwide. It consists of 9 tracks and contains nearly 64 minutes of music, with Duda acting as sole composer and playing all instruments except drums.

Album reviews pointed out that Walking on a Flashlight Beam differs significantly from the project's previous releases, with greater emphasis on electronics as well as a strong rhythm, resulting in a rock-oriented sound.

=== 2017: Fractured ===
On 6 October 2017, Lunatic Soul's fifth album, titled Fractured, was released by Mystic Production in Poland and Kscope internationally. It consists of eight tracks in an electronic rock style, blending elements of progressive rock and ambient music as well as the addition of a symphony orchestra.

Duda has stated that the inspiration for the album was the death of two people close to him—his father and Piotr Grudziński, guitarist of Riverside.

=== 2018: Under the Fragmented Sky ===
The sixth Lunatic Soul album, titled Under the Fragmented Sky, was released on 25 May 2018. Consisting of eight tracks, all of which are instrumental except the title track and "Untamed".

Reviewers emphasized the material's accessibility

=== 2020: Through Shaded Woods ===
The seventh album by Lunatic Soul, Through Shaded Woods, came out on 13 November 2020. It is inspired by Scandinavian and Slavic folk music and references the work of bands such as Heilung and Wardruna. The album consists of six tracks, and in a special limited edition, it includes over 30 minutes of additional music. For the first time in the project's history, Duda plays all the instruments on the record.

Through Shaded Woods includes fewer electronic elements, which dominated earlier Lunatic Soul albums, consisting instead of acoustic and electric guitars, bass. and keyboards.

=== 2025: The World Under Unsun ===
At the end of 2024, Duda announced that Lunatic Soul's eighth record would be released in 2025 and is intended to be a double album, containing almost 1.5 hours of music. On 10 June 2025, Lunatic Soul released the first single from the album, titled The World Under Unsun.

== Discography ==
Title	Album details	Peak chart positions			
Title	Album details	POL	GER	NLD	SWI
Lunatic Soul	Released: 13 October 2008; Label: Mystic Production, Snapper Music; Formats: CD, digital download	23	—	—	—
Lunatic Soul II	Released: 9 November 2010; Label: Mystic Production, Kscope Music; Formats: CD, LP, digital download	13	—	—	—
Impressions	Released: 8 November 2011; Label: Kscope Music; Formats: CD, LP, digital download	—	—	—	—
Walking on a Flashlight Beam	Released: 13 October 2014; Label: Mystic Production, Kscope Music; Formats: CD, CD+DVD, LP, digital download	11	—	—	—
Fractured	Released: 6 October 2017; Label: Mystic Production, Kscope Music; Formats: CD, MC, LP, digital download	4	—	118	—
Under the Fragmented Sky	Released: 25 May 2018; Label: Mystic Production, Kscope Music; Formats: CD, LP, digital download	10	95	—	—
Through Shaded Woods	Released: 13 November 2020; Label: Kscope Music; Formats: CD, LP, digital download	5	71	—	96
The World Under Unsun	Released: 31 October 2025; Label: Inside Out Music; Formats: 2×CD, 2×LP, digital download	—	71	—	55
"—" denotes a recording that did not chart or was not released in that territory.
