= Under the Fragmented Sky =

Studio album by Lunatic Soul
- Released: 25 May 2018
- Recorded: 2016–2018
- Studio: Serakos Studio, Warsaw, Poland
- Genre: Progressive rock
- Length: 36:07
- Label: Kscope; Mystic Production
- Producer: Mariusz Duda; Robert Srzednicki; Magda Srzednicka

Lunatic Soul chronology
Fractured (2017)	Under the Fragmented Sky (2018)	Through Shaded Woods (2020)

Singles from Under the Fragmented Sky
- 1. "Untamed" Released: 19 April 2018

Professional ratings
Review scores
Source	Rating
Magazyn Gitarzysta	9/10 stars

Under the Fragmented Sky is the sixth studio album by Lunatic Soul, the side project of Riverside bassist, vocalist, and songwriter Mariusz Duda. The album was released on 25 May 2018 by Kscope.

== Background ==
Lunatic Soul's previous album, Fractured, was released in 2017 following the death of both Riverside co-founder and guitarist Piotr Grudziński as well as Duda's father in 2016. With around 90 minutes of music written and recorded, Duda initially considered releasing Fractured as a double album, before deciding instead to trim the album down to around 55 minutes, removing any instrumental tracks (the first Lunatic Soul album to do so), and focusing on the songs which sounded the most different to previous Lunatic Soul releases.

Initially, Under The Fragmented Sky was conceived as a supplementary mini-album to Fractured, consisting of mostly instrumental, unreleased music which did not make the record. However, by January 2018 the project had grown into a full length album, with additional recording sessions taking place between December 2017 and February 2018 at Serakos studio, Warsaw. The album focusses on instrumental and wordless soundscapes — in contrast to Fractured, only two of the album's eight tracks feature lyrics. Nevertheless, according to Duda, the album still serves as a supplement to Fractured.

== Recording ==
The album was recorded between June 2016 and June 2017 (during the sessions for Lunatic Soul's previous album, Fractured) and between December 2017 and February 2018, at Serakos Studio in Warsaw, Poland.

== Track listing ==
No.	Title	Length
1.	"He Av En"	4:03
2.	"Trials"	5:34
3.	"Sorrow"	1:29
4.	"Under the Fragmented Sky"	5:01
5.	"Shadows"	4:30
6.	"Rinsing the Night"	4:55
7.	"The Art of Repairing"	7:54
8.	"Untamed"	3:23

== Personnel ==
Credits adapted from the Lunatic Soul website.

Lunatic Soul

- Mariusz Duda – music, lyrics, all instruments (except drums on "Untamed")

Additional personnel

- Wawrzyniec Dramowicz – drums on "Untamed"

Production

- Mariusz Duda – producer, recording, mixing, mastering
- Magda Srzednicka – producer, recording, mixing, mastering
- Robert Srzednicki – producer, recording, mixing, mastering

Design

- Jarek Kubicki – illustration, design, layout

== Charts ==
Chart (2018)	Peak position
German Albums (Offizielle Top 100)	95
Polish Albums (ZPAV)	10
