= Eye of the Soundscape =

Compilation album by Riverside
- Released: 21 October 2016
- Recorded: 2007–2016
- Studio: Serakos Studio, Warsaw
- Genre: Ambient music Instrumental rock
- Length: 102:14
- Label: InsideOut Music
- Producer: Mariusz Duda, Magda Srzednicka, Robert Srzednicki

Riverside chronology
Love, Fear and the Time Machine (2015)	Eye of the Soundscape (2016)	Wasteland (2018)

Singles from Eye of the Soundscape
- 1. "Shine/Time Travellers" Released: 21 October 2016

Eye of the Soundscape is a compilation album by Polish progressive rock band Riverside, released on 21 October 2016 through InsideOut Music.

== Background ==
The album is a collection of older experimental instrumental pieces in addition to four new tracks: "Where the River Flows", "Shine" (released in Poland as the only single), "Sleepwalkers" and "Eye of the Soundscape".

It is the first, and only, posthumous album to feature guitarist Piotr Grudziński after his death on 21 February 2016.

== Track listing ==
All tracks are written by Mariusz Duda, Michał Łapaj and Piotr Grudziński.

Disc 1
No.	Title	Original album	Length
1.	"Where the River Flows"	New song	10:53
2.	"Shine"	New song	4:09
3.	"Rapid Eye Movement" (2016 mix)	"Schizophrenic Prayer" (single)	12:40
4.	"Night Session – Part One"	Shrine of New Generation Slaves (bonus disc)	10:40
5.	"Night Session – Part Two"	Shrine of New Generation Slaves (bonus disc)	11:35
Total length:			49:57

Disc 2
No.	Title	Original album	Length
1.	"Sleepwalkers"	New song	7:19
2.	"Rainbow Trip" (2016 mix)	"Schizophrenic Prayer" (single)	6:19
3.	"Heavenland"	Love, Fear and the Time Machine (bonus disc)	4:59
4.	"Return"	Love, Fear and the Time Machine (bonus disc)	6:50
5.	"Aether"	Love, Fear and the Time Machine (bonus disc)	8:43
6.	"Machines"	Love, Fear and the Time Machine (bonus disc)	3:53
7.	"Promise"	Love, Fear and the Time Machine (bonus disc)	2:44
8.	"Eye of the Soundscape"	New song	11:30
Total length:			52:17

== Personnel ==
Riverside

- Mariusz Duda – loops and percussion (except "Heavenland", "Promise" and "Eye of the Soundscape"); bass (CD1: 1–3; CD2: 1, 2, 4); acoustic guitar (CD1: 1, 2 and 4; CD2: 1, 3, 4, 7); vocals (CD1: 1, 3 and 5; CD2: 1, 2); keyboards on "Nigh Session – Part One", "Sleepwalkers" and "Machines"; ukulele on "Night Session – Part Two", "Rainbow Trip" and "Promise"; fretless bass on "Aether"
- Michał Łapaj – keyboards (except "Heavenland" and "Promise"); synthesizers (except "Nigh Session – Part Two, "Heavenland" and "Promise"); electric piano on "Night Sessions"; piano on "Heavenland"; organ on "Eye of the Soundscape"
- Piotr Grudziński – electric guitar (except "Shine", "Heavenland" and "Machines")
- Piotr Kozieradzki – drums on "Rapid Eye Movement"

Guest personnel

- Marcin Odyniec – saxophone on "Night Session – Part Two"

Production

- Mariusz Duda – production
- Magda & Robert Srzednicki – production, recording, mixing, mastering

== Charts ==
Chart (2016)	Peak position
Belgian Albums (Ultratop Flanders)	122
Belgian Albums (Ultratop Wallonia)	112
Dutch Albums (Album Top 100)	60
German Albums (Offizielle Top 100)	69
Polish Albums (ZPAV)	4
Swiss Albums (Schweizer Hitparade)	92
