= ID.Entity =

Studio album by Riverside
- Released: January 20, 2023
- Studio: The Boogie Town Studio, Otwock; Serakos Studio, Warsaw
- Length: 53:11
- Label: InsideOut; Mystic
- Producer: Mariusz Duda

Riverside chronology
Wasteland (2018)	ID.Entity (2023)

Singles from ID.Entity
- 1. "I'm Done with You" Released: October 21, 2022; 2. "Self-Aware" Released: November 29, 2022; 3. "Friend or Foe?" Released: January 10, 2023

ID.Entity is the eighth album by Polish progressive rock band Riverside, released on January 20, 2023, by Inside Out Music and Mystic Production and was produced by bassist Mariusz Duda. The album peaked at #2 in Poland and #4 in Germany. It is the only album to feature lead guitarist Maciej Meller as a full member, who had replaced Piotr Grudziński (following his death in 2016) as a touring member in 2017 before joining the band as a full member in 2020. Meller was featured on Wasteland, but only as a guest. It is also the last studio album to feature bassist and lead singer Mariusz Duda before his departure from the band on April 23, 2026.

The cover was created by Polish artist Jarek Kubicki. The first single "I'm Done With You", was released on October 21, 2022, along with a music video. The tracks "Self-Aware" and "Friend or Foe?" would be released as singles in November and January respectively.

== Track listing ==
All tracks are written by Mariusz Duda, except where noted.

ID.Entity track listing
No.	Title	Music	Length
1.	"Friend or Foe?"	Duda; Michał Łapaj	7:29
2.	"Landmine Blast"		4:50
3.	"Big Tech Brother"	Duda; Łapaj	7:24
4.	"Post-Truth"		5:37
5.	"The Place Where I Belong"		13:16
6.	"I'm Done With You"		5:52
7.	"Self-Aware"		8:43
Total length:			53:11

Bonus tracks
No.	Title	Music	Length
8.	"Age of Anger"		11:56
9.	"Together Again"	Duda; Łapaj	6:29
10.	"Friend or Foe?" (Single Edit)	Duda; Łapaj	5:59
11.	"Self-Aware" (Single Edit)		5:29
Total length:			83:04

== Personnel ==
- Mariusz Duda – vocals, bass guitar, electric guitar, acoustic guitar, producer
- Piotr Kozieradzki – drums
- Michał Łapaj – keyboards, synthesizer, piano, organ
- Maciej Meller – electric guitar

== Charts ==
=== Weekly charts ===
Weekly chart performance for ID.Entity
Chart (2023)	Peak position
Austrian Albums (Ö3 Austria)	22
Belgian Albums (Ultratop Flanders)	125
Belgian Albums (Ultratop Wallonia)	87
Dutch Albums (Album Top 100)	9
Finnish Albums (Suomen virallinen lista)	14
French Albums (SNEP)	155
German Albums (Offizielle Top 100)	4
Polish Albums (ZPAV)	2
Scottish Albums (OCC)	10
Spanish Albums (Promusicae)	63
Swiss Albums (Schweizer Hitparade)	6
UK Albums (OCC)	89
UK Rock & Metal Albums (OCC)	3

=== Year-end charts ===
Year-end chart performance for ID.Entity
Chart (2023)	Position
Polish Albums (ZPAV)	62
