= Lunatic Soul II =

Studio album by Lunatic Soul
- Released: October 25, 2010
- Recorded: 2010
- Genre: Progressive rock
- Length: 50:43
- Label: Kscope
- Producer: Mariusz Duda, Robert Srzednicki, Magda Srzednicka

Lunatic Soul chronology
Lunatic Soul (2008)	Lunatic Soul II (2010)	Impressions (2011)

Lunatic Soul II is the second solo album by Riverside vocalist and bass guitarist Mariusz Duda released under the name Lunatic Soul.

The album was released on 25 October 2010 by both Mystic Production and Kscope, debuting at No. 13 on the OLiS chart in Poland. Reviewers compared the music to such artists as Dead Can Dance and Peter Gabriel.

Music critics pointed out that Lunatic Soul II is more musically accessible than the debut and includes more melodic content. They placed emphasis on Duda's continued experimentation, expressed through the use of unconventional instruments, such as the Chinese guzheng, tubular bells, the cajón, and the kalimba.

In terms of lyrics, while the Lunatic Soul's debut was a “black” album symbolizing the passage to the realm of death, the second album was planned as “white,” meant to represent the transition to the side of life.

== Track listing ==
All songs written by Mariusz Duda, except where noted.

No.	Title	Writer(s)	Length
1.	"The In-Between Kingdom"		6:48
2.	"Otherwhere"		2:48
3.	"Suspended in Whiteness"		7:56
4.	"Asoulum"		6:23
5.	"Limbo"	Mariusz Duda, Maciej Szelenbaum	1:53
6.	"Escape from ParadIce"	Mariusz Duda, Maciej Szelenbaum	4:39
7.	"Transition"	Mariusz Duda, Maciej Szelenbaum	11:07
8.	"Gravestone Hill"		3:41
9.	"Wanderings"	Mariusz Duda, Rafał Buczek	5:28

== Personnel ==
- Mariusz Duda – vocals, bass, acoustic guitar, percussion
- Maciej Szelenbaum - piano, keyboards
- Wawrzyniec Dramowicz - drums, percussion

== Reception ==
Professional ratings
Review scores
Source	Rating
AllMusic	4/5 stars

== Charts ==
Chart (2010)	Peak position
Polish Albums Chart	13
