= Panic Room (disambiguation) =

Panic Room is a 2002 American thriller film directed by David Fincher.

Panic Room may also refer to:

- Panic room or safe room, a fortified room in a residence or business
- Panic Room (band), a Welsh progressive rock band
- Panic Room (album) or the title song, by Paulmac, 2005
- "Panic Room" (song), a 2018 song by Au/Ra and CamelPhat
- "Panic Room", a song by Silent Planet from Everything Was Sound, 2016
- "Panic Room", a song by Theory of a Deadman from Savages, 2014

== See also ==
- "02 Panic Room", a 2007 song by Riverside
- "Panic Roommate", a 2011 episode of the TV series Gossip Girl
