= Through Shaded Woods =

Studio album by Lunatic Soul
- Released: 13 November 2020
- Recorded: April 2019 – August 2020
- Studio: Serakos Studio, Warsaw, Poland
- Genre: Progressive rock, progressive folk
- Length: 39:50
- Producer: Mariusz Duda; Robert Srzednicki; Magda Srzednicka

Lunatic Soul chronology
| Under the Fragmented Sky (2018) | Through Shaded Woods (2020) | The World Under Unsun (2025) |

Singles from Through Shaded Woods
- 1. "The Passage" Released: 24 September 2020

Through Shaded Woods is the seventh studio album by Lunatic Soul, the side project of Riverside bassist, vocalist, and songwriter Mariusz Duda, released on 13 November 2020. The album was described by Duda as 'more folky' than previous releases, with more influence from Scandinavian and Slavic folk and fewer electronic elements. In Poland, Through Shaded Woods peaked at number 5 on OLiS (Oficjalna Lista Sprzedaży, Official Sales Chart). Mariusz Duda composed all the songs and, for the first time in Lunatic Soul's history, played all the instruments on the album.

On Through Shaded Woods Duda maintains the melancholy and darkness characteristic of his music, but this time he focuses also on "light and hope." There are less electronics on the album, which dominated earlier Lunatic Soul albums. The release is based on organic sounds of acoustic and electric guitars, bass and keyboard instruments. The songs contain the use of various sounds inscribed in folk - whispered choirs, pulsating rhythmic drums or delicate keyboards.

Reviewers noted that Through Shaded Woods is the most positive album from Lunatic Soul. As the portal rockserwis.fm stated: "In this difficult time of covid-19, full of challenges and anxiety during the pandemic, Mariusz Duda invites us on a walk into the forest to seek harmony and peace, and to forget, even for a moment, about the depressing everyday life."

In the extended version of the album, the second disc features the suite "Transition II," a nearly 28-minute-long piece which is the longest composition in Mariusz Duda's career.

== Track listing ==
Through Shaded Woods
| No. | Title | Length |
|---|---|---|
| 1. | "Navvie" | 4:03 |
| 2. | "The Passage" | 8:57 |
| 3. | "Through Shaded Woods" | 5:51 |
| 4. | "Oblivion" | 5:03 |
| 5. | "Summoning Dance" | 9:52 |
| 6. | "The Fountain" | 6:04 |
| Total length: | | 39:50 |

Bonus disc
| No. | Title | Length |
|---|---|---|
| 7. | "Vyraj" | 5:32 |
| 8. | "Hylophobia" | 3:20 |
| 9. | "Transition II" | 27:45 |
| Total length: | | 76:27 |

== Personnel ==
Credits adapted from the Lunatic Soul website.

Lunatic Soul

- Mariusz Duda – music, lyrics, all instruments

Production

- Mariusz Duda – production, mixing
- Magda Srzednicka – production, recording, mixing, mastering
- Robert Srzednicki – production, recording, mixing, mastering

Design

- Łukasz "Pachu" Pach – artwork design and layout
- Julia Malec – cover symbol and corner designs
- Tomasz Pulsakowski – images
- Tomasz Bogdan – images

== Charts ==
| Chart (2020) | Peak position |
|---|---|
| German Albums (Offizielle Top 100) | 71 |
| Polish Albums (ZPAV) | 5 |
| Swiss Albums (Schweizer Hitparade) | 96 |
