= Impressions (Lunatic Soul album) =

2011 studio album by Lunatic Soul

Studio album by Lunatic Soul
- Released: October 17, 2011
- Label: Kscope

Lunatic Soul chronology
Lunatic Soul II (2010)	Impressions (2011)	Walking on a Flashlight Beam (2014)

Impressions is third album by Lunatic Soul, a Polish progressive rock side-project founded by Mariusz Duda, released on October 17, 2011 by Kscope,. It is project's first entirely instrumental record. The tracks were created during the recording sessions for the previous two albums and were initially intended to be an addition to the reissues of those albums. Duda ultimately felt that the compositions were strong enough to stand as a separate record.

When asked why the album was instrumental, Duda explained: "I grew up mainly on instrumental music. I had to have such an album in my discography". The album features unusual instruments such as orchestral bells, ukulele, and kalimba. The tracks on Impressions also include a range of non-musical sounds, such as an electrocardiogram, falling water droplets, and steel being forged. Duda's voice is rarely present and functions more as an additional instrument than as traditional vocals.

The tracks on the album do not have specific titles. The names of the individual compositions are simply the numbers of successive "impressions.".

The album's artwork was designed by Travis Smith, known for his collaborations with bands such as Opeth and Riverside. The album was distributed in Poland by Mystic Production

== Track listing ==
1. Impression I (5:29)
2. Impression II (4:04)
3. Impression III (7:03)
4. Impression IV (3:57)
5. Impression V (5:02)
6. Impression VI (7:33)
7. Impression VII (3:13)
8. Impression VIII (4:24)
9. Gravestone Hill (remix) (3:51)
10. Summerland (remix) (4:26)

== Personnel ==
- Mariusz Duda – vocal, glockenspiel, acoustic guitar, bass, keys, kalimba, ukulele
- Maciej Szelenbaum - piano, quzheng, flute, strings
- Wawrzyniec Drabowicz - drums
