= Idmen =

IDMEN

Studio album by Indukti
- Released: July 24, 2009
- Genre: Progressive metal
- Length: 63:16
- Label: InsideOut Music
- Producer: Indukti/W.Kozłowski

Indukti chronology
S.U.S.A.R. (2004)	IDMEN (2009)

Professional ratings
Review scores
Source	Rating
Sputnikmusic	2.5/5 stars
USA Progressive Music	10/10 stars

IDMEN is the second full-length album by the Polish rock band Indukti.

The album is a metaphorical tale of the human struggle with destiny, faith, daily life, nature, and self. The album's title is taken from the mermaid's song from the twelfth book of Homer's Odyssey and means "we know" or "we've seen":

ἴδμεν γάρ τοι πάνθ' ὅσ' ἐνὶ Τροίῃ εὐρείῃ
Ἀργεῖοι Τρῶές τε θεῶν ἰότητι μόγησαν,
ἴδμεν δ', ὅσσα γένηται ἐπὶ χθονὶ πουλυβοτείρῃ.

(For we know all the toils that in wide Troy
the Argives and Trojans endured through the will of the gods,
and we know all things that come to pass upon the fruitful earth.)

The song Tusan Homichi Tuvota, sung and with lyrics by Nils Frykdahl from Sleepytime Gorilla Museum, is based on an old Hopi tale transcribed by Edward A. Kennard and Albert Yava, and published in 1944 by the Education Division of the United States Indian Service.

The album cover depicts a painting by Justyn Parafianowicz.

== Track listing ==
1. "Sansara" - 8:12
2. "Tusan Homichi Tuvota" (feat. Nils Frykdahl) - 9:03
3. "Sunken Bell" - 2:29
4. "...and Who's the God Now?!" (feat. M. Taff) - 10:25
5. "Indukted" - 6:51
6. "Aemaet" - 8:25
7. "Nemesis Voices" (feat. M. Luginbuehl) - 6:19
8. "Ninth Wave" - 11:32

== Personnel ==
- Maciej Jaśkiewicz – guitar
- Ewa Jabłońska – violin
- Wawrzyniec Dramowicz – drums
- Andrzej Kaczyński – bass
- Piotr Kocimski – guitar/saz

=== Guest musicians ===
- Nils Frykdahl – vocal
- Maciej Taff – vocal
- Michael Luginbuehl – vocal
- Marta Maślanka – dulcimer
- Robert Majewski – trumpet
