= Wasteland (Riverside album) =

Studio album by Riverside
- Released: 28 September 2018
- Recorded: December 2017–July 2018
- Studio: Serakos Studio, Warsaw, Poland
- Genre: Progressive rock
- Length: 50:50
- Label: InsideOut Music
- Producer: Mariusz Duda; Magda and Robert Srzednicki

Riverside chronology
Eye of the Soundscape (2016)	Wasteland (2018)	ID.Entity (2023)

Singles from Wasteland
- 1. "Vale of Tears" Released: 27 July 2018; 2. "River Down Below" Released: 7 September 2018; 3. "Lament" Released: 21 September 2018

Wasteland is the seventh studio album by Polish progressive rock band Riverside. The album was released on 28 September 2018, through InsideOut Music. The album reached number one in Poland and Sweden, the top 20 in Germany, and the top 40 in Austria, Finland, the Netherlands and Switzerland. It is the first album without founding guitarist Piotr Grudziński after his death on 21 February 2016.

== Track listing ==
All tracks are written by Mariusz Duda, except where noted.

No.	Title	Music	Length
1.	"The Day After"		1:48
2.	"Acid Rain"	Duda · Michał Łapaj	6:03
3.	"Vale of Tears"		4:49
4.	"Guardian Angel"		4:24
5.	"Lament"		6:09
6.	"The Struggle for Survival"	Duda · Łapaj	9:32
7.	"River Down Below"		5:41
8.	"Wasteland"		8:25
9.	"The Night Before"	Łapaj	3:59

Limited edition bonus track
No.	Title	Length
10.	"River Down Below" (Edit)	4:25

Special edition bonus DVD
No.	Title	Length
1.	"Wasteland" (full album Hi-Res Stereo)	50:50
2.	"Wasteland" (Surround Mix)	50:50
3.	"Lament" (video)	6:11
4.	"River Down Below" (video)	5:40
5.	"Wasteland" (video)	8:33

Acoustic Session – Special edition bonus CD
No.	Title	Length
1.	"Vale of Tears" (acoustic)	5:18
2.	"Out of Myself" (acoustic)	3:57
3.	"02 Panic Room" (acoustic)	3:26
4.	"River Down Below (Acoustic)" (acoustic)	5:01
5.	"Wasteland" (live intro)	9:00

== Personnel ==
Riverside

- Mariusz Duda – vocals, electric and acoustic guitars, bass, piccolo bass, banjo; guitar solo on "Lament" and "Wasteland"
- Piotr Kozieradzki – drums
- Michał Łapaj – keyboards and synthesizers, rhodes piano and Hammond organ; theremin on "Wasteland"

Guest personnel

- Maciej Meller – guitar solo on "Acid Rain", "Guardian Angel", "The Struggle for Survival" and "River Down Below"
- Michał Jelonek – violin on "The Day After", "Lament" and "Wasteland"
- Mateusz Owczarek – guitar solo on "Vale of Tears"

== Charts ==
Chart (2018)	Peak position
Austrian Albums (Ö3 Austria)	39
Belgian Albums (Ultratop Flanders)	111
Belgian Albums (Ultratop Wallonia)	79
Dutch Albums (Album Top 100)	28
Finnish Albums (Suomen virallinen lista)	30
German Albums (Offizielle Top 100)	13
Polish Albums (ZPAV)	1
Spanish Albums (PROMUSICAE)	43
Swiss Albums (Schweizer Hitparade)	23
UK Albums (OCC)	83
US Heatseekers Albums (Billboard)	16

== Certifications ==
Region	Certification	Certified units/sales
Poland (ZPAV)	Gold	15,000^{‡}
^{‡} Sales+streaming figures based on certification alone.
