= Love, Fear and the Time Machine =

Studio album by Riverside
- Released: 4 September 2015
- Recorded: November 2014 – June 2015
- Venue: Poland
- Studios: Serakos Studio, Warsaw
- Genre: Progressive rock
- Length: 60:25
- Label: InsideOut Music
- Producers: Riverside, Magda and Robert Srzedniccy

Riverside chronology
Shrine of New Generation Slaves (2013)	Love, Fear and the Time Machine (2015)	Eye of the Soundscape (2016)

Singles from Love, Fear and the Time Machine
- 1. "Discard Your Fear" Released: 9 July 2015; 2. "Found (The Unexpected Flaw of Searching)" Released: 4 September 2015; 3. "Time Travellers" Released: 11 February 2016

Love, Fear and the Time Machine is the sixth studio album by Polish progressive rock band Riverside. The album was released on 4 September 2015 through InsideOut Music.

== Background ==
It was their final album to feature guitarist Piotr Grudziński before his death on 21 February 2016. Illustration, design and layout for the album were completed by Travis Smith. The album was recorded, mixed and mastered at Serakos Studio in Warsaw, Poland between November 2014 and June 2015 by Magda and Robert Srzednicki.

Prior to the release of the album on 9 July 2015, the label released a lyric video for "Discard Your Fear". The same day the album premiered the band released a music video for "Found (The Unexpected Flaw of Searching)" and on 11 February 2016, another lyric video was released, this time for the song "Time Travellers."

Professional ratings
Review scores
Source	Rating
Metal Injection	8/10
Louder Than War	9/10 stars
Scream	4/6 stars

== Track listing ==
All tracks are written by Mariusz Duda, except where noted.

No.	Title	Length
1.	"Lost (Why Should I Be Frightened By a Hat?)"	5:52
2.	"Under the Pillow"	6:47
3.	"#Addicted"	4:53
4.	"Caterpillar and the Barbed Wire"	6:56
5.	"Saturate Me"	7:09
6.	"Afloat"	3:12
7.	"Discard Your Fear"	6:42
8.	"Towards the Blue Horizon"	8:09
9.	"Time Travellers"	6:42
10.	"Found (The Unexpected Flaw of Searching)"	4:03
Total length:		60:25

Vinyl bonus track
No.	Title	Music	Length
11.	"Promise"	Duda · Piotr Grudziński · Michał Łapaj	2:44

Day Session: limited edition bonus disc
No.	Title	Music	Length
1.	"Heavenland"	Duda · Grudziński · Łapaj	4:59
2.	"Return"	Duda · Grudziński · Łapaj	6:50
3.	"Aether"	Duda · Grudziński · Łapaj	8:43
4.	"Machines"	Duda · Grudziński · Łapaj	3:53
5.	"Promise"	Duda · Grudziński · Łapaj	2:44
Total length:			27:09

== Personnel ==
Riverside

- Mariusz Duda – vocals, bass, acoustic guitar, ukulele
- Piotr Grudziński – guitar
- Michał Łapaj – keyboards
- Piotr Kozieradzki – drums

== Charts ==
Chart (2015)	Peak position
Austrian Albums (Ö3 Austria)	58
Belgian Albums (Ultratop Flanders)	73
Belgian Albums (Ultratop Wallonia)	51
Dutch Albums (Album Top 100)	4
French Albums (SNEP)	130
German Albums (Offizielle Top 100)	18
Polish Albums (ZPAV)	2
Scottish Albums (Official Charts)	64
Swiss Albums (Schweizer Hitparade)	25
UK Albums (Official Charts)	67
UK Progressive Albums (Official Charts)	4
