= Walking on a Flashlight Beam =

Studio album by Lunatic Soul
- Released: 13 October 2014
- Recorded: Serakos Studio, Warsaw, Poland, 2014
- Genre: Progressive rock
- Length: 63:46
- Label: Kscope; Mystic
- Producer: Mariusz Duda; Robert Srzednicki; Magda Srzednicka

Lunatic Soul chronology
Impressions (2011)	Walking on a Flashlight Beam (2014)	Fractured (2017)

Singles from Walking on a Flashlight Beam
- 1. "Cold" Released: 6 October 2014

Professional ratings
Review scores
Source	Rating
Magazyn Gitarzysta	10/10 stars
Sputnik Music	3.5/5 stars

Walking on a Flashlight Beam is the fourth studio album by the Polish progressive rock project Lunatic Soul. It was released on 13 October 2014 by Mystic Production in Poland and Kscope worldwide. The album consists of nine tracks and contains nearly 64 minutes of music. Mariusz Duda composed all the songs and played all the instruments on the album, except for the drums.

Reviews pointed out that Walking on a Flashlight Beam differs significantly from the project's previous releases. This time, Duda leaned much more into electronics and a strong, expressive rhythm, resulting in an album that at times is very loud and rock-oriented. Critics also noted that with Walking on a Flashlight Beam, Duda confirmed his talent as a composer and created his own original music—which no longer strongly references the artists often mentioned in reviews of previous Lunatic Soul albums.

The album includes a DVD containing a documentary film about its creation.

== Track listing ==
No.	Title	Length
1.	"Shutting Out the Sun"	8:39
2.	"Cold"	6:57
3.	"Gutter"	8:41
4.	"Stars Sellotaped"	1:34
5.	"The Fear Within"	7:10
6.	"Treehouse"	5:31
7.	"Pygmalion's Ladder"	12:01
8.	"Sky Drawn in Crayon"	4:58
9.	"Walking on a Flashlight Beam"	8:10

Special edition DVD
No.	Title	Length
1.	"In Between" (documentary)	25:00

== Charts ==
Chart (2014)	Peak position
Polish Albums (ZPAV)	11
