= Myrtwa =

EP by Indukti
- Released: 20 September 2002 (original release); 6 September 2002 (rerelease)
- Genre: Progressive metal
- Length: 24:21

Indukti chronology
Myrtwa (2002)	S.U.S.A.R. (2004)

Myrtwa is the promo EP by the Polish progressive band Indukti.

== Track listing ==
1. Turecki - (4:35)
2. Mantra (live)* - (8:35)
3. Tap (live)* - (11:11)

'* Recorded in Proxima 21.11.2000

== Line-Up ==
- Maciej Adamczyk - bass guitar
- Bartek Nowak - drums
- Ewa Jabłońska - violin
- Baretek Kuzia - guitar
- Piotr Kocimski - guitar
