= S.U.S.A.R. =

Studio album by Indukti
- Released: September 20, 2004
- Genre: Progressive metal
- Length: 47:39
- Label: Sunspot Records

Indukti chronology
Myrtwa (2002)	S.U.S.A.R. (2004)	IDMEN (2009)

Professional ratings
Review scores
Source	Rating
Exclaim!	(favorable)

S.U.S.A.R. is the first full-length album by the band Indukti. The album was released by OFF Music on September 20, 2004, and was re-released by The Laser's Edge on September 6, 2005. On November 17, 2013, Sunspot Records released S.U.S.A.R for the first time on 180g vinyl. The LP was cut at half-speed by Stan Ricker. The title abbreviation comes from medicine and means "Suspected Unexpected Serious Adverse Reaction"

The album is partly inspired by the film Metropolis by Fritz Lang.

== Track listing ==
1. "Freder" – (7:30)
2. "Cold Inside...I" – (4:06)
3. "No. 11812" – (8:00)
4. "Shade" – (4:29)
5. "Uluru" – (6:34)
6. "No. 11811" – (7:25)
7. "...and Weak II" – (9:37)
8. "Mantra" (bonus track - only on USA CD and Vinyl edition)

=== Personnel ===
- Maciej Jaśkiewicz – guitar
- Ewa Jabłońska – violin
- Wawrzyniec Dramowicz – drums
- Maciej Adamczyk – bass guitar
- Piotr Kocimski – guitar, saz, didgeridoo

=== Guest musicians ===
- Mariusz Duda – vocals
- Anna Faber – harp
