= Out of Myself =

Studio album by Riverside
- Released: 21 September 2004
- Recorded: 2003
- Genre: Progressive rock
- Length: 53:17
- Label: Laser's Edge
- Producer: Riverside

Riverside chronology
Out of Myself (2004)	Second Life Syndrome (2005)

Out of Myself is the debut studio album by the Polish progressive rock band Riverside, released on 21 September 2004. It was first released under the Laser's Edge and is the first album in the boxed set Reality Dream Trilogy which includes Out of Myself, Second Life Syndrome and Rapid Eye Movement.

== Critical reception ==
Riverside's debut full album Out of Myself was met with critical acclaim among progressive rock and metal reviewers. The album was described as "a rare thing of beauty" by MetalCrypt reviewer Bruce Dragonchaser. Boris at Metal Reviews stated that he was "lucky" to have "stumbled" on the album. "...one of the most treasured pieces in my collection", noted Ivor at Metal Storm. In 2024, Loudwire elected it as one of the 11 best progressive metal debut albums.

Norway's Scream Magazine only gave it a 4 out of 6 score, opining that the band opted for "too safe" solutions rather than "the more intricate and virtuose".

== Album style ==
Out of Myself has been described as an "emotional musical journey", "powerful in a subtle way", with "slight elements of metal, arena rock, grunge, and even dub." At the same time, the album has been termed "the band's gentle first outing." Built on the strength of Mariusz Duda's bass guitar, the music also relies on a soaring atmosphere of Jacek Melnicki's keyboards and "long, weeping, long stretched high guitar notes" of Piotr Grudziński's lead guitar.

== Track listing ==
All lyrics are written by Mariusz Duda; all music is composed by Riverside.

No.	Title	Length
1.	"The Same River"	12:01
2.	"Out of Myself"	3:43
3.	"I Believe"	4:14
4.	"Reality Dream" (instrumental)	6:15
5.	"Loose Heart"	4:50
6.	"Reality Dream II" (instrumental)	4:45
7.	"In Two Minds"	4:38
8.	"The Curtain Falls"	7:59
9.	"OK"	4:46

== Personnel ==
=== Riverside ===
- Mariusz Duda – vocals, bass, acoustic guitar
- Piotr Grudziński – lead and rhythm guitars
- Jacek Melnicki – keyboards
- Piotr Kozieradzki – drums, percussion

=== Additional musicians ===
- Krzysztof Melnicki – trombone on "OK"

== Production ==
- Arranged and produced by Riverside
- Recorded and engineered by Jacek Melnicki
- Mixed by Robert and Magda Srzednicki
- Mastered by Grzegorz Piwkowski

== Charts ==
Chart (2021)	Peak position
German Albums (Offizielle Top 100)	13
