= Indukti =

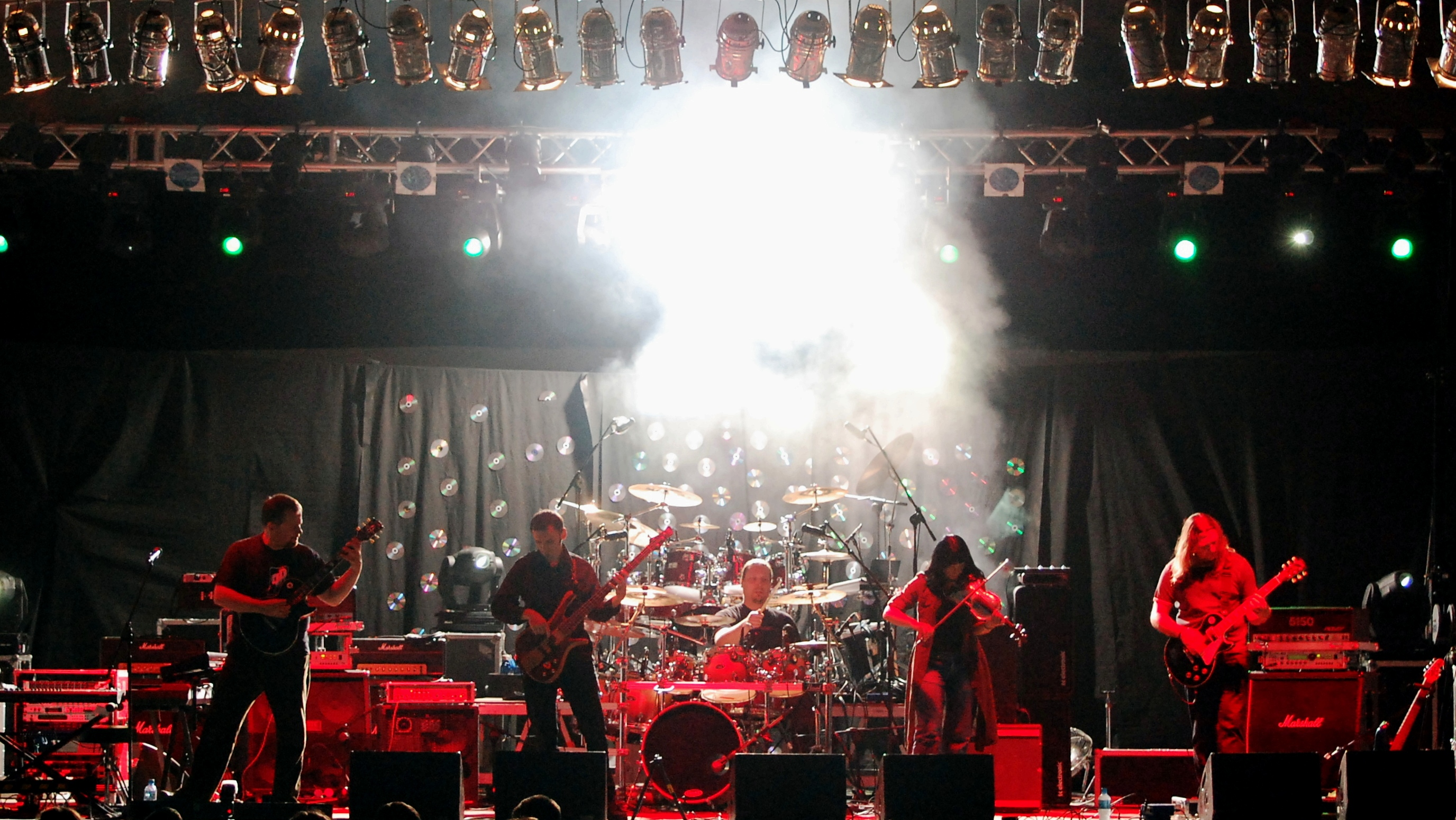
- Indukti live at InoRockFest 2009. From left to right: Piotr Kocimski, Andrzej Kaczynski, Wawrzyniec Dramowicz, Ewa Jablonska and Maciej Jaskiewicz.

Background information
- Origin: Warsaw, Poland
- Genres: Progressive rock, progressive metal, folk metal, post metal
- Years active: 2000-2011; since 2011 on hiatus
- Labels: Laser's Edge, InsideOut Music, Mystic Production
- Members: Wawrzyniec Dramowicz; Ewa Jabłońska; Piotr Kocimski; Maciej Jaśkiewicz; Maciej Adamczyk
- Past members: Andrzej Kaczyński; Bartek Nowak; Bartek Kuzia; Michał Mioduszewski
- Website: indukti.com

Indukti is a progressive metal band from Poland, founded in 1999. Their debut album, S.U.S.A.R., featured Mariusz Duda of the Polish band Riverside on vocals.

Indukti's performances of concerts and festivals include NEARfest 2007 and Baja Prog Festival 2007. According to their website, Indukti entered the studio on 7 January 2008 to start recording their latest album, IDMEN, which was released on 24 July 2009.

== Lineup ==
- Wawrzyniec Dramowicz – drums, percussion
- Ewa Jabłońska – violin
- Piotr Kocimski – guitars
- Maciej Jaśkiewicz – guitars
- Andrzej Kaczyński – bass guitar, doublebass

== Discography ==
=== Albums ===
Title	Album details
Myrtwa (EP)	Released: 20 September 2002; Label: Self-released; Formats: CD
S.U.S.A.R.	Released: 20 September 2004; Label: OFFmusic, Laser's Edge; Formats: CD, LP
Mutum (EP)	Released: 4 December 2008; Label: Inside Out Music; Formats: CD
IDMEN	Released: 27 July 2009; Label: Mystic Production, Inside Out Music/Century Media; Formats: CD, digital download

=== Singles and music videos ===
- "Shade" (2005)
