= Rapid Eye Movement (album) =

Studio album by Riverside
- Released: 28 September 2007 (European InsideOut release); 24 September 2007 (Mystic Production release); 9 October 2007 (InsideOut release)
- Recorded: 2006–2007
- Studio: Serakos Studio, Warsaw
- Genre: Progressive rock, progressive metal
- Length: 55:51 (original album); 33:26 (bonus disc)
- Label: InsideOut Music
- Producer: Riverside, Magda and Robert Srzedniccy

Riverside chronology
Second Life Syndrome (2005)	Rapid Eye Movement (2007)	Reality Dream (2008)

Singles from Rapid Eye Movement
- 1. "02 Panic Room" Released: 10 June 2007; 2. "Schizophrenic Prayer" Released: 17 March 2008

Professional ratings
Review scores
Source	Rating
DPRP	8-9½/10
Metal Storm	(9/10)
HardRockHouse	(8.9/10)
Sea of Tranquility	5/5 stars

Rapid Eye Movement is the third studio album by Polish progressive rock band Riverside. It was released on 28 September 2007 in Europe by InsideOut Music, on 24 September by Mystic Productions in Poland, and internationally by InsideOut Music on 9 October 2007.

== Background ==
Rapid Eye Movement is the final installment of the Reality Dream Trilogy which includes Out of Myself and Second Life Syndrome. The album is split into two parts, entitled "Fearless" (tracks 1–5) and "Fearland" (tracks 6–9).

A two-CD Digipack version of the album was also released and includes extra tracks and some video footage. There are also two outtakes from the last Reality Dream Suite, the title track and "Reality Dream IV". Instead, both are included in the bonus disk, and the final instrumental suite is titled "Lucid Dream IV".

The album was named as one of Classic Rock‘s 10 essential progressive rock albums of the decade.

In 2009, Century Media Records Ltd., under exclusive license from InsideOut Music, released a 2-CD version including the bonus disk originally included in the 2007 Digipak version, without the video footage.

== Track listing ==
All lyrics are written by Mariusz Duda; all music is written by Riverside, except a portion of bonus track "Back to the River", which is an excerpt of "Shine On You Crazy Diamond" by Pink Floyd.

Part One: Fearless
No.	Title	Length
1.	"Beyond the Eyelids"	7:56
2.	"Rainbow Box"	3:37
3.	"02 Panic Room"	5:29
4.	"Schizophrenic Prayer"	4:21
5.	"Parasomnia"	8:10

Part Two: Fearland
No.	Title	Length
6.	"Through the Other Side"	4:06
7.	"Embryonic"	4:10
8.	"Cybernetic Pillow"	4:46
9.	"Ultimate Trip"	13:13

Special edition bonus disc
No.	Title	Length
1.	"Behind the Eyelids"	6:17
2.	"Lucid Dream IV"	4:32
3.	"02 Panic Room" (remix)	3:23
4.	"Back to the River"	6:28
5.	"Rapid Eye Movement"	12:39

== Personnel ==
- Mariusz Duda – vocals, bass guitar, acoustic guitar
- Piotr Grudziński – guitars
- Michał Łapaj – keyboards
- Piotr Kozieradzki – drums

== Charts ==
Chart (2010)	Peak position
Dutch Albums Chart	73
Polish Albums Chart	2
