= Shrine of New Generation Slaves =

Studio album by Riverside
- Released: January 21, 2013
- Recorded: 2012
- Studio: Serakos Studio, Warsaw, Poland
- Genre: Progressive rock
- Length: 50:59
- Label: Mystic Production; InsideOut Music
- Producer: Riverside; Magda and Robert Srzedniccy

Riverside chronology
| Anno Domini High Definition (2009) | Shrine of New Generation Slaves (2013) | Love, Fear and the Time Machine (2015) |

Singles from Shrine of New Generation Slaves
- 1. "Celebrity Touch" Released: 17 December 2012

Professional ratings
Review scores
| Source | Rating |
|---|---|
| Sputnikmusic | 4/5 stars |
| Allmusic | (favorable) |
| Bloody Disgusting | 4.5/5 stars |

Shrine of New Generation Slaves is the fifth studio album by Polish progressive rock band Riverside. The album was released on 18 January 2013 in Poland, 21 January in the rest of Europe, and 5 February in the US. It is available in four different formats: digital, 1CD jewelcase, 2CDs mediabook, and 2LP vinyl. The latter two contain two bonus tracks. The author of the art booklets is, as is the case with all the previous albums, Travis Smith. The first single, "Celebrity Touch", was released on 17 December 2012 and a videoclip for the song, directed by Mateusz Winkiel, was released on 14 January 2013.

== Track listing ==
All lyrics are written by Mariusz Duda; all music is composed by Riverside.

| No. | Title | Length |
|---|---|---|
| 1. | "New Generation Slave" | 4:17 |
| 2. | "The Depth of Self-Delusion" | 7:39 |
| 3. | "Celebrity Touch" | 6:48 |
| 4. | "We Got Used to Us" | 4:12 |
| 5. | "Feel Like Falling" | 5:17 |
| 6. | "Deprived (Irretrievably Lost Imagination)" | 8:26 |
| 7. | "Escalator Shrine" | 12:41 |
| 8. | "Coda" | 1:39 |

LP edition/Limited edition bonus disc
| No. | Title | Length |
|---|---|---|
| 1. | "Night Session – Part One" | 10:45 |
| 2. | "Night Session – Part Two" | 11:22 |

== Personnel ==
Riverside

- Mariusz Duda – vocals, bass, acoustic guitar, ukulele
- Piotr Grudziński – guitar
- Michał Łapaj – keyboards and Hammond organ
- Piotr Kozieradzki – drums

Guest Personnel

- Marcin Odyniec – Soprano sax on 'Deprived' and alto sax on 'Night Session – Part Two'

== Charts ==
| Chart (2010) | Peak position |
|---|---|
| Polish Albums Chart | 2 |
| German Albums Chart | 33 |
| Dutch Albums Chart | 28 |
