= Anno Domini High Definition =

Studio album by Riverside
- Released: June 15 2009 (Poland), July 6 2009 (Europe), July 28 2009 (North America)
- Recorded: 2009
- Genre: Progressive rock, progressive metal
- Length: 44:44
- Label: Mystic Production; InsideOut Music / SPV GmbH
- Producer: Riverside

Riverside chronology
Rapid Eye Movement (2007)	Anno Domini High Definition (2009)	Memories in My Head (2011)

Anno Domini High Definition is the fourth studio album by Polish progressive rock band Riverside and also the first full-length Riverside album that is separate from the Reality Dream suite. The album was released in Poland on Friday 19 June 2009 through Mystic Production and was released in Europe on 6 July 2009 through InsideOut. The album was a commercial success in the band's home country of Poland where it reached the top of the official album chart. The art design and direction was, once again, handled by Travis Smith.

A special edition of the album includes a bonus DVD, filmed during a December 2008 live performance at Amsterdam's Paradiso club.

== Track listing ==
No.	Title	Length
1.	"Hyperactive"	5:45
2.	"Driven to Destruction"	7:06
3.	"Egoist Hedonist": "I. Different?"; "II. Hedonist Party"; "III. Straw Man Dance"	8:57
4.	"Left Out"	10:59
5.	"Hybrid Times"	11:53

=== Special edition bonus DVD 'Live in Amsterdam 2008' ===
1. "Volte-Face" - 8:50
2. "I Turned You Down" - 5:10
3. "Reality Dream III" - 5:16
4. "Beyond The Eyelids" - 7:23
5. "Conceiving You" - 4:18
6. "Ultimate Trip" - 5:07
7. "02 Panic Room" - 4:43
  Professional ratings
  Review scores
  Source	Rating
  Allmusic	4/5 stars
  Lords of Metal	5/5 stars
  Metal Storm	(9/10)
  Obnoxious Listeners	5/5 stars

== Personnel ==
=== Riverside ===
- Mariusz Duda – vocals, bass, acoustic guitar
- Piotr Grudziński – guitar
- Michał Łapaj – keyboards, theremin
- Piotr Kozieradzki – drums

=== Guest musicians ===
- Rafał Gańko – trumpet on "Egoist Hedonist"
- Karol Gołowacz – saxophone on "Egoist Hedonist"
- Adam Kłosiński – trombone on "Egoist Hedonist"

=== Production ===
- Produced by Riverside and Szymon Chech
- Recorded and mixed by Szymon Chech
- Mastered by Grzegorz Piwkowski

== Charts ==
Chart (2010)	Peak position
Polish Albums Chart	1
German Albums Chart	94
Dutch Albums Chart	58
