= Mariusz Duda =

Polish musician (born 1975)

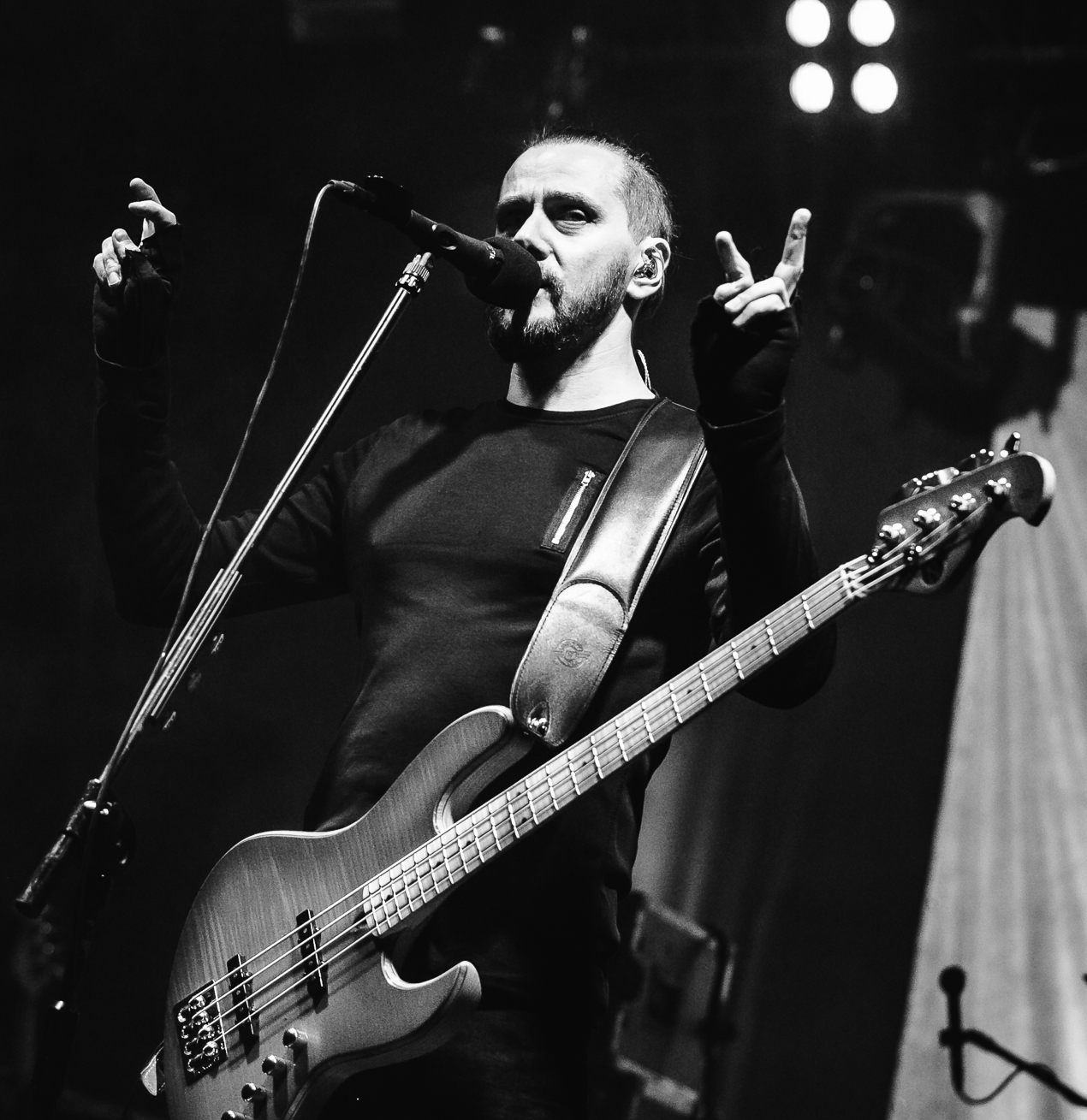
- Duda performing with Riverside in 2019

Background information
- Born: 25 September 1975 (age 51); Węgorzewo, Poland
- Genres: Progressive rock; progressive metal; art rock; ambient
- Occupations: Musician; songwriter
- Instruments: Vocals; bass; guitar; piccolo bass; keyboards; drums; percussion
- Years active: 1995–present
- Member of: Lunatic Soul; Meller Gołyźniak Duda
- Formerly of: Decay; Xanadu; Riverside
- Website: mariuszduda.md

Mariusz Duda (born 25 September 1975) is a Polish musician, composer, vocalist, lyricist, multi-instrumentalist, and music producer. Duda is best known for his performances with the rock band Riverside, one of the most internationally recognized Polish bands, where he served as the main composer, vocalist, bassist, guitarist, and lyricist until his departure in 2026. He is also the creator of the solo project Lunatic Soul and has released solo albums under his own name. With Riverside, he received numerous awards, including Best Anthem at the Progressive Music Awards 2016.

== Biography ==
Mariusz Duda was born on 25 September 1975, in Węgorzewo. At the age of five, he began singing in a school band. When he was ten, his mother enrolled him in piano lessons. The exercises during his piano lessons were his first inspiration to start creating his own compositions.

Ever since I can remember, I always preferred creating my own sounds. I would take the key to the piano room, sneak through those dark corridors, lock the door, toss my backpack aside, and instead of practicing the assigned pieces, I'd start fiddling around with my own stuff.

— Mariusz Duda, Riverside. Sen w wysokiej rozdzielczości

In the second half of the 1980s, he became interested in electronic music, particularly artists such as Tangerine Dream, Vangelis, Mike Oldfield, and Jean-Michel Jarre. He became interested in progressive rock in high school. The first progressive album he came across was The Lamb Lies Down on Broadway by Genesis.

I was mainly looking for albums with elaborate keyboard parts, because I had to find some common ground between prog rock and my favorite electronic music. Naturally, bands like Yes and Emerson, Lake & Palmer came into the picture. I also remember listening to Marillion a lot.

— Mariusz Duda, Riverside. Sen w wysokiej rozdzielczości

At the age of 15, together with his school friends, he formed a band called Decay. That was also the first time he took on the role of a singing bassist. The band played metal music inspired by groups such as Metallica, Testament, and Flotsam and Jetsam. With Decay, he played his first-ever concert at a rock festival in Węgorzewo in 1991. In September 1992, he joined the neo-progressive band Xanadu, initially as a keyboardist. After a few months of being active in both bands, Duda left Decay and focused solely on Xanadu. After passing his final exams in 1994, he decided to take a gap year and concentrate on music. That same year, he performed with Xanadu at the Jarocin Festival. The band also released a cassette titled Najdalszy brzeg (The Farthest Shore), which, due to poor distribution, failed to reach a wider audience. In 1995, he began part-time law studies in Toruń. A year later, Xanadu recorded the album Wczorajsze ślady (Traces of Yesterday), but the material was never officially released. In 1996, the band Xanadu disbanded, and Duda became a cultural animator in Węgorzewo. He organized concerts, directed theatrical performances, and composed music for them. In 1997, he dropped out of university and returned to making music in various formations. He also worked as a sound technician, among other jobs, but seeing no prospects for a music career in his hometown, in 2000 he decided to move to Warsaw. He worked at a car rental company, attended an advertising school, and after work played in a metal band called Hexen with his coworkers. The group had no plans for a professional career, but by sharing the same rehearsal space, in November 2001 he met Piotr Kozieradzki, Jacek Melnicki, and Piotr Grudziński, which led to him joining their lineup—and that lineup evolved into the band Riverside.)

== Musical projects ==
=== Riverside ===
Mariusz Duda was the vocalist, bassist, guitarist, main composer, and lyricist of the band. Riverside performed at numerous international festivals such as Arrow Rock and Bospop in the Netherlands, Masstival in Turkey, Baja Prog in Mexico, Masters of Rock in the Czech Republic, Monsters of Rock in Spain, and Nearfest and ProgPower in the USA. The Anno Domini High Definition Tour of 2009/2010 attracted nearly 20,000 fans worldwide. In April 2026, Duda announced he was quitting Riverside, citing a deteriorating relationship within the band.

=== Lunatic Soul ===
Mariusz Duda's solo project, which was launched in 2008, emerged "from the need to explore other musical territories." Under the name Lunatic Soul, seven albums have been released so far. As the project developed, the Lunatic Soul releases began to form a cycle that the artist himself called The Circle of Life and Death. The entire cycle is intended to consist of eight albums.

=== Solo career ===
==== 2020–2021: Lockdown trilogy ====
===== Lockdown Spaces =====
In June 2020, during the COVID-19 pandemic, Mariusz Duda released his first album under his own name, titled Lockdown Spaces. The album features electronic music based on synthesizers and samples and is almost entirely instrumental. There are no acoustic or bass guitar sounds on the album, and it was released without any prior announcement from the artist.

Lockdown Spaces is a dark, minimalist, and claustrophobic album. It's my gift to fans for these uneasy lockdown times. Lockdown makes me think of a square, of a pixel, which is why I decided that my new music would feature a lot of pixelated electronics.

— Mariusz Duda, cantaramusic.pl

The album was nominated by the Polish Phonographic Academy for 2021 Fryderyk award in the "Electronic" category.

===== Claustrophobic Universe =====
In April 2021, Mariusz Duda announced that he had decided to use the pandemic times to create a new musical trilogy and simultaneously revealed the release of a new album.

Claustrophobic Universe is the second part of the new trilogy that I decided to create during the lockdowns with electronic instrumental music—the kind I used to make as a teenager, recording on cassettes using a Grundig tape recorder. (...) The fact that these "lockdown" albums are now released only on cassette tapes is directly related to my past and those early beginnings, which truly shaped me as a musician.

— Mariusz Duda, strefamusicart.pl

The material for Claustrophobic Universe was created between January and March 2021. The album was released on 23 April of the same year. The title refers to the confined life that societies had been living since the outbreak of the COVID-19 pandemic. The idea behind the trilogy was that the artist wanted to describe enclosed spaces through sound. Claustrophobic Universe, like Lockdown Spaces, is an album filled with electronic music. It draws from the classics of the genre, offering references to the works of Vangelis, Klaus Schulze, and Tangerine Dream, while also including tracks characterized by a modern approach to electronic music, such as short vocal samples and glitchy percussion. An animated music video was created for the track Knock Lock.

===== Interior Drawings =====
In December 2021, the third and final part of the pandemic trilogy was released. Like the previous two albums, Interior Drawings is a record featuring minimalist, instrumental electronic music, enriched only by samples and fragmented use of vocals. Among the entire trilogy, this is the most melodic album, and conceptually, it offers the listener a different theme than those presented on the earlier parts of the trilogy.

Lockdown Spaces addressed the theme of confinement caused by external factors. Claustrophobic Universe spoke about the desire to escape the chaos of the surrounding reality. In contrast, Interior Drawings is a story about what the process of thought flow looks like and what happens in the mind of a person who decides to create a project. The symbolic "drawing" samples that appear throughout the album can represent anything: writing a novel, painting a picture, directing a film, designing an architectural project, composing a music album, or any other creative process that begins with the proverbial "blank page.

— Mariusz Duda, cantaramusic.pl

As the second album in Mariusz Duda's solo work, the record was nominated for the Fryderyk Award by the Polish Phonographic Academy in the "Electronic" category.

===== 2022: Let's Meet Outside =====
The album was released in May 2022. The mini-album is not part of the so-called Lockdown Trilogy, but it serves as a summary of two years of experimentation with electronic music. The premise of all the albums included in trilogy was to use only electronic instruments and vocals. However Let's Meet Outside also features instruments such as bass guitar and electric guitar. The albums from the pandemic trilogy were initially available only in digital formats or on cassette tapes. With the release of Let's Meet Outside, all four albums were also released on CD. The publisher of these four albums was the British label Kscope.

===== 2023: AFR AI D =====
In November 2023, the fourth album by Mariusz Duda released under his own name was published. The over 40-minute concept album is inspired by the theme of fear of artificial intelligence—though not exclusively.

Each of us is afraid of something. Especially in today's difficult and uncertain times. Each of us struggles with our own demons, with our fears. We probably won't get rid of them. But we can learn to live with them. We can gain distance from them. We can also ensure they don't dominate our lives. That's what the album AFR AI D is mainly about—about taming our nightmares.

— Mariusz Duda, portalwinylowy.pl

The album is dominated by electronic music that leans strongly toward rock, and it also features guitar solos. Mariusz Duda played all the instruments himself, except for the electric guitar, which was performed by guest musician Mateusz Owczarek from Lion Shepherd. The album was promoted by four singles: Embracing The Unknown, Bots' Party, I Love To Chat With You and Good Morning Fearmongering. Music videos were created for the tracks Bots' Party and I Love To Chat With You. For the third time in Mariusz Duda's solo career, the album was nominated for Fryderyk Award by the Polish Phonographic Academy in the "Electronic" category.

== Artistic style ==
=== Riverside ===
Riverside is commonly categorized as a representative of progressive rock or progressive metal. The band has performed concerts and toured alongside groups associated with this genre, such as Opeth, Anathema and Dream Theater. However, Duda challenges this categorization of the band's work.

Riverside is a band in which melody has always been the most important element. Personally, I don't have a knack for jumping all over the fretboard—it's boring to me and not particularly appealing—but I can write a beautiful song and sing or play a catchy melody. That's what I stick to and build both my and the band's style around. I'm a melancholic by nature, which is why Riverside has a lot of sad melodies—but those are simply the ones I like the most, even though I try to escape from them from time to time. Nevertheless, melancholic rock doesn't bother me, and I think it suits our music better than progressive rock or progressive metal.

— Mariusz Duda, infomusic.pl

=== Lunatic Soul ===
Lunatic Soul is a fully original and solo project by Mariusz Duda. This is also emphasized by the name itself, whose number of letters corresponds to the number of letters in the musician's first and last name. A distinctive feature of Lunatic Soul's music is the absence of guitar in the compositions. In terms of style, Duda's solo project escapes standard classifications. Reviewers describe Lunatic Soul's compositions as "very oriental, trance-like, eclectic, even genre-transcending variations on the overall themes of rock, electronic, and folk music." They also emphasize Duda's artistic vision, a constant element of which is "the search for unconventional sounds, arrangement nuances and details, as well as experimenting with sound in the realm of broadly understood electronic music, ambient, and trip hop."

=== Mariusz Duda ===
The albums released under the musician's own name differ from the releases of his primary band Riverside and his solo project Lunatic Soul. The music, largely based on minimalist electronics and featuring only a small number of vocal parts, significantly deviates from the song-oriented rock and folk convention presented by the other projects. Despite the considerably greater popularity of both Riverside and Lunatic Soul recordings, the composer himself emphasizes that his "third musical world" is equally important to him.

Music is my therapy. I create because it helps me cope with my personal demons. I realize that much of my music—especially this third musical world based mainly on electronic music—is the most personal in that regard. I don't think about how people will receive it; I just want to get rid of negative thoughts. Here, I focused primarily on myself and started creating music that may not be particularly listenable to a broader audience. In Riverside and Lunatic Soul, I do think about my listeners—I'd be lying if I said I don't care about them. But when I create electronic music, I no longer do it for them—I do it mainly for myself. Maybe that's why this musical world isn't as popular as Riverside or Lunatic Soul, and not just because it's mostly instrumental music. Here, I'm simply taking more care of my own therapy.

— Mariusz Duda, meakultura.pl

== Discography ==
=== Solo ===
- Lockdown Spaces (2020)
- Claustrophobic Universe (2021)
- Interior Drawings (2021)
- Let's Meet Outside (EP, 2022)
- Intervallum (EP, 2022)
- AFR AI D (2023)

=== with Riverside ===
- Out of Myself (2003)
- Second Life Syndrome (2005)
- Rapid Eye Movement (2007)
- Anno Domini High Definition (2009)
- Shrine of New Generation Slaves (2013)
- Love, Fear and the Time Machine (2015)
- Wasteland (2018)
- ID.Entity (2023)

=== as Lunatic Soul ===
- Lunatic Soul (2008)
- Lunatic Soul II (2010)
- Impressions (2011)
- Walking on a Flashlight Beam (2014)
- Fractured (2017)
- Under the Fragmented Sky (2018)
- Through Shaded Woods (2020)
- The World Under Unsun (2025)

=== with Meller Gołyźniak Duda ===
- Breaking Habits (2016)
- Live (2018)

=== Guest appearances ===
- Indukti – S.U.S.A.R. (2004; guest vocals on "Freder", "Cold Inside...I", "Shade")
- Amarok – Metanoia (2004; guest vocals on "Canticle", "Rules", "Look Around", "Come What May", "The Moment", "The Day After..."); Hunt (2017; guest vocals and co-writing credits on one track)
- "The Old Peace" (2014; vocals, guitars, and co-writing with Steven Wilson)
- iamthemorning – Lighthouse (2016; guest vocals on "Lighthouse")
