= Second Life Syndrome =

Studio album by Riverside
- Released: 31 October 2005
- Recorded: July–August 2005
- Studio: Serakos Studio and Hard Studio, Warsaw, Poland
- Genre: Progressive rock, progressive metal
- Length: 63:34
- Label: Inside Out Music (International edition); Mystic Production (Polish edition)
- Producer: Riverside, Magda & Robert Srzedniccy

Riverside chronology
Out of Myself (2003)	Second Life Syndrome (2005)	Rapid Eye Movement (2007)

Singles from Second Life Syndrome
- 1. "Conceiving You" Released: 1 October 2005

Professional ratings
Review scores
Source	Rating
DPRP	9.2/10

Second Life Syndrome is the second studio album by Polish progressive rock band Riverside, released on 31 October 2005.

This second release garnered quite as much praise as Out of Myself and was released on the large prog rock label Inside Out Music. Second Life Syndrome has a noticeably more raw and heavy feel than Out of Myself which in general was much more laid back and mellow. The title track has been said in one radio interview to be one of the best songs to sum up Riverside's sound. The song contains three parts: A slightly aggressive first part, a mellow and quiet second part, and an instrumental third part. This album is the second part of the Reality Dream trilogy which would explain the first and last track's titles; Second Life Syndrome comes after Out of Myself but before Rapid Eye Movement.

As of March 2009, the album is #43 on Metal Storm's Top 100 albums of all-time list. Dream Theater drummer Mike Portnoy named Second Life Syndrome one of his favourite albums of 2005.

== Track listing ==
All lyrics are written by Mariusz Duda; all music is composed by Riverside

No.	Title	Length
1.	"After"	3:31
2.	"Volte-Face"	8:40
3.	"Conceiving You"	3:40
4.	"Second Life Syndrome"; I. "From Hand to Mouth"; II. "Secret Exhibition"; III. "Vicious Ritual"	15:40
5.	"Artificial Smile"	5:27
6.	"I Turned You Down"	4:34
7.	"Reality Dream III"	5:01
8.	"Dance with the Shadow"	11:38
9.	"Before"	5:23
Total length:		63:39

== Personnel ==
Riverside

- Mariusz Duda – vocals, bass
- Piotr Grudziński – guitar
- Michał Łapaj – keyboards
- Piotr Kozieradzki – drums

Production

- Produced By Riverside, Magda & Robert Srzedniccy
- Recorded, Engineered & Mixed By Magda & Robert Srzedniccy
- Mastered By Jacek Gawłowski

== Charts ==
Chart (2010)	Peak position
Polish Albums Chart	22
