= Piotr Kozieradzki =

Polish drummer (born 1970)

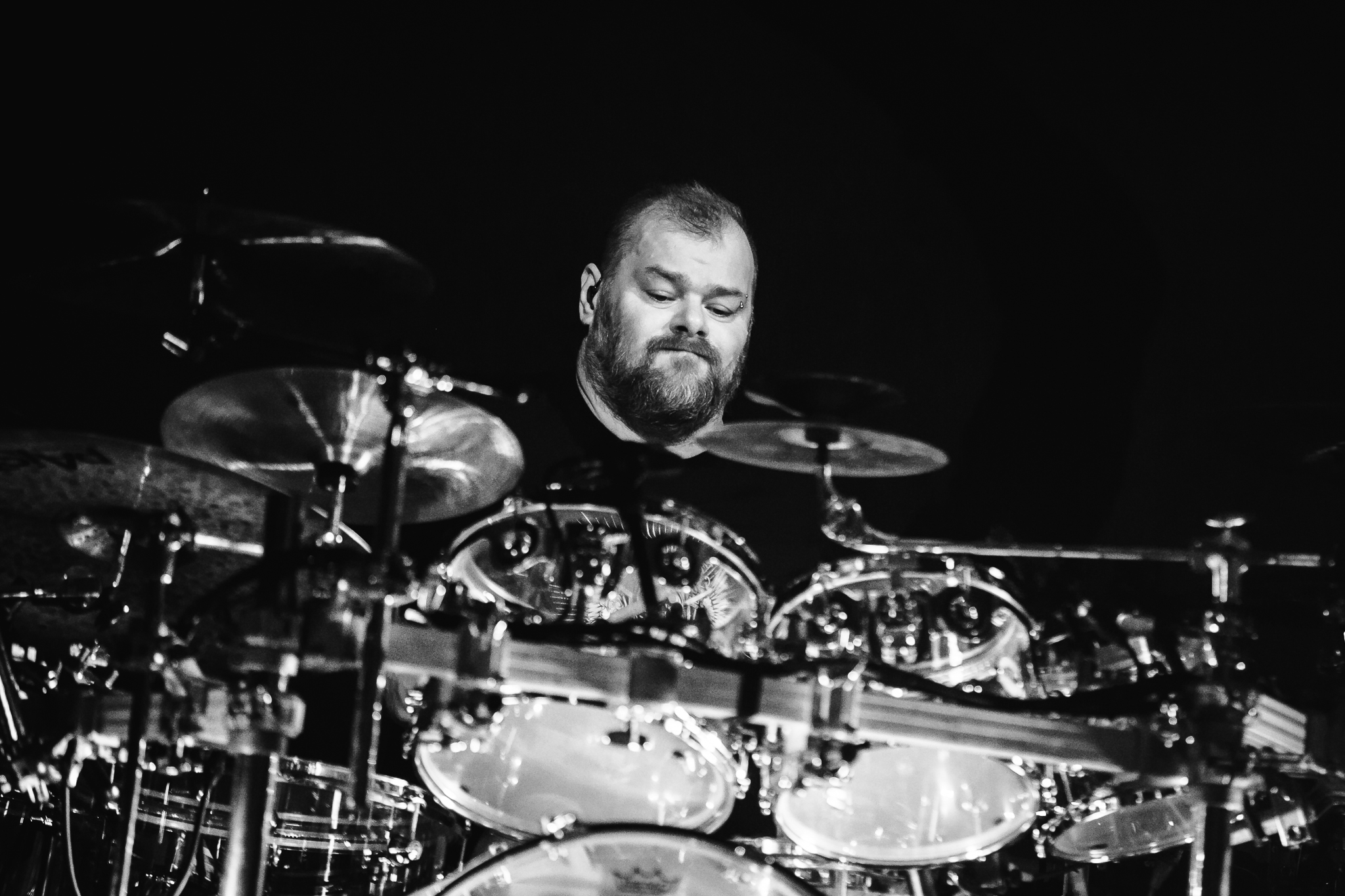
- Kozieradzki performing with Riverside in 2019

Background information
- Also known as: Mitloff
- Born: 23 May 1970 (age 55); Warsaw, Poland
- Genres: Progressive metal; progressive rock; death metal; black metal
- Occupation: Musician
- Years active: 1990–present
- Member of: Riverside
- Formerly of: Hate; Thunderbolt; Kataxu; Swastyka; Goetia; Dark Prophecies; Domain

Piotr Włodzimierz Kozieradzki (born 23 May 1970), also known as Mitloff, is a Polish drummer. He has contributed to bands such as Riverside, Hate, Thunderbolt, Kataxu, Goetia, Dark Prophecies, and Domain.

Kozieradzki is endorsed by Czarcie Kopyto and Paiste. He also uses DW drums, Remo drumheads, and Pearl hardware. Since 2010, he owns and runs ProgTeam Management.

== Discography ==
- Hate – Daemon Qui Fecit Terram (1996, Novum Vox Mortiis)
- Hate – Lord is Avenger (1998, Novum Vox Mortiis)
- Domain – ...From Oblivion (1999, Apocalypse Productions)
- Hate – Victims (EP, 1999, Metal Mind Productions)
- Hate – Evil Decade of Hate (2000, Apocalypse Productions)
- Kataxu – Roots Thunder (2000, Slava Productions)
- Thunderbolt – The Sons of the Darkness (2001, Apocalypse Productions)
- Goetia – Hail Satan (2001, ISO 666)
- Hate – Holy Dead Trinity (2001, WWIII Records)
- Domain – Gat Etemmi (2002, Apocalypse Productions)
- Hate – Cain's Way (2002, WWIII Records)

- Riverside – Out of Myself (2003, Laser's Edge, Mystic Production)
- Thunderbolt – The Burning Deed of Deceit (2003, ISO 666)
- Riverside – Second Life Syndrome (2005, InsideOut, Mystic Production)
- Kataxu – Hunger of Elements (2005, Supernal Music)
- Riverside – Rapid Eye Movement (2007, InsideOut, Mystic Production)
- Riverside – Anno Domini High Definition (2009, InsideOut, Mystic Production)
- Division by Zero – Independent Harmony (2010, Prog Team)
- Riverside – Shrine of New Generation Slaves (2013, InsideOut, Mystic Production)
- Riverside – Love, Fear and the Time Machine (2015, InsideOut)
- Riverside – Eye of the Soundscape (2016, InsideOut)
- Riverside – Wasteland (2018, InsideOut)
- Riverside – ID.Entity (2023, InsideOut)
