= Michał Łapaj =

Polish keyboardist (born 1982)

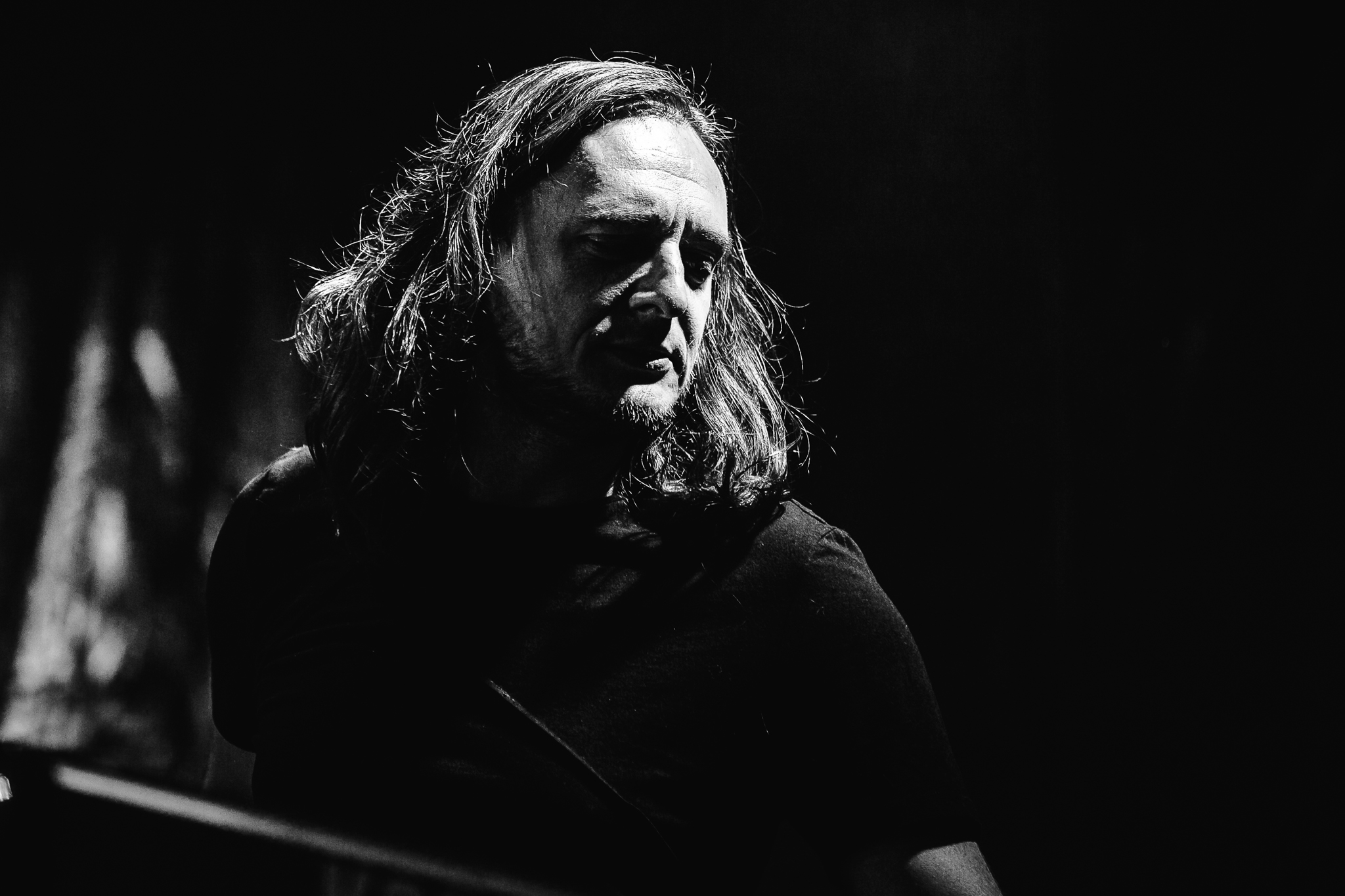

Background information
- Born: 3 March 1982 (age 43)
- Origin: Poland
- Genres: Progressive metal, progressive rock, electronic music
- Occupations: Musician, Producer, Composer, Sound Designer
- Instruments: Keyboards, theremin, Hammond organ, Synthesizers
- Member of: Riverside

Michał Krzysztof Łapaj (born 3 March 1982) is a Polish musician, composer, producer, instrumentalist, and sound designer. He is best known for his longstanding performances in the progressive metal band Riverside, of which he has been a member since 2003. He has also appeared on albums by projects such as Leash Eye, Behemoth, Antigama, Lunatic Soul, and Tangerine Dream.

He is a member of the phonographic academy of the Polish Society of the Phonographic Industry (ZPAV) and the Association of Authors and Composers (ZAiKS).

He is self-taught. He began learning to play keyboard instruments at the age of 4. In order to improve his skills, he attended the Institute of Organ Training in Warsaw and the Author's School of Popular Music and Jazz named after Krzysztof Komeda.

He mainly plays Hammond organs and analog synthesizers from the 1970s and 1980s.

In 2021, after nearly 20 years of career in his original band, Michał released his first solo album "Are You There". This album ranked highly in music portal rankings not only in Poland but also abroad. It was chosen as the album of the year on the polish radio station "Rockserwis FM", and ZPAV academy members nominated "Are You There" for the Fryderyk Award in the Electronic Album of the Year category.

The album reached the fifth position in the best-selling albums in Poland according to the OLiS chart, with its vinyl version ranking third.

In August 2021, at the United Arts Festival, Michał performed his first solo concert. Following his performance, the festival's star was the legendary band "Tangerine Dream", which invited Michał as a special guest for a joint improvisation in the final part of their performance. An album titled Tangerine Dream - The Sessions VIII was released from this event.

On February 22, 2022, Michał released an album called "Sessions". It is a compilation of previously recorded improvised electronic music tracks. Initially, they appeared as videos on the YouTube platform under the name "Analog Jam Session". Transformed into tracks in their original form as Session 1, Session 2, and Session 3, they were mixed and remastered, and Session 4 and Session 5 tracks were composed in studio conditions to fully create the album "Sessions".

In 2023, he collaborated with the newly established game development studio Symbiotic Labs, where he serves as the composer for the soundtrack of the game "The Arbor", and also works as a sound designer for the game's audio.

== Discography ==
Riverside

- Second Life Syndrome (2005, InsideOut, Mystic Production)
- Rapid Eye Movement (2007, InsideOut, Mystic Production)
- Anno Domini High Definition (2009, InsideOut, Mystic Production)
- Shrine of New Generation Slaves (2013, InsideOut, Mystic Production)
- Love, Fear and the Time Machine (2015, InsideOut, Mystic Production)
- Eye of the Soundscape (2016, InsideOut)
- Wasteland (2018, InsideOut)
- ID.Entity (2023, InsideOut)

Solo album

- Are You There (2021, Mystic Production)
- Sessions (2022)

Guest appearances

- Lunatic Soul – Lunatic Soul (2008, Kscope Music, Mystic Production)
- Leash Eye – V.E.N.I (2009, Metal Mundus)
- Antigama – Meteor (2013, SelfMadeGod Records)
- Behemoth – The Satanist (2014, Metal Blade, Nuclear Blast)
- Behemoth – I Loved You at Your Darkest (2018, Metal Blade, Nuclear Blast)
- Behemoth – Opvs Contra Natvram (2022, Nuclear Blast)
- Tangerine Dream - The Sessions VIII (2023, Tangerine Dream Music)
