= Riverside (band) =

Polish progressive rock band

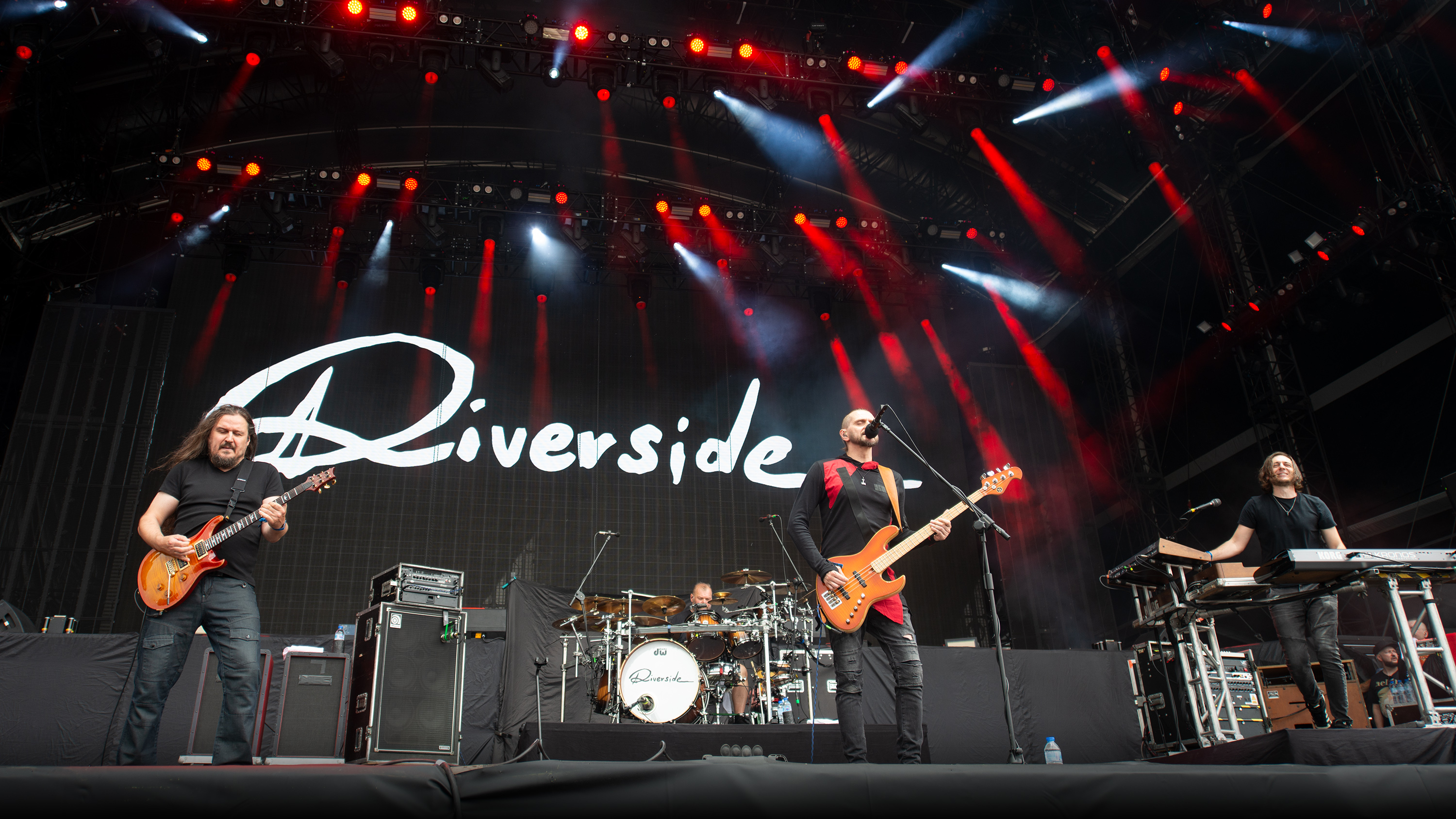
- Riverside performing in 2023

Background information
- Origin: Warsaw, Poland
- Genres: Progressive rock; progressive metal
- Years active: 2001–present
- Labels: Inside Out; Mystic Production
- Spinoffs: Hate; Meller Gołyźniak Duda
- Members: Piotr Kozieradzki; Michał Łapaj
- Past members: Jacek Melnicki; Piotr Grudziński (died 2016); Mariusz Duda; Maciej Meller
- Website: riversideband.pl

Riverside is a Polish progressive rock band from Warsaw. It was founded in 2001 by guitarist Piotr Grudziński; drummer Piotr Kozieradzki; bassist and vocalist Mariusz Duda; and keyboardist Jacek Melnicki. Melnicki was replaced by Michał Łapaj in 2003. Grudziński died in 2016, and guitarist Maciej Meller joined the band in 2020. As of 2026, they have released eight studio albums, three EPs, four live records, and three compilations, as well as a number of singles. In April 2026, Duda and Meller announced their departure from the band.

== History ==
=== Beginnings and Out of Myself ===
Drummer Piotr "Mitloff" Kozieradzki had played with the death metal band Hate between 1990 and 2001, while guitarist Piotr Grudziński had been a member of Unnamed from 1993 until 2003. Together with keyboardist Jacek Melnicki and vocalist, bassist, and acoustic guitarist Mariusz Duda, they formed Riverside in 2001. Melnicki left in 2003 and was replaced by Michał Łapaj. The band's debut studio album, titled Out of Myself, was released later that year in Poland, and it came out a year later in the United States, with artwork by Travis Smith.

=== Voices in My Head and Second Life Syndrome ===
Following their successful debut, Riverside issued the EP Voices in My Head in 2005 and followed it with their second full-length album, Second Life Syndrome, released under Inside Out Music later that year. It reached number 62 on Prog Archives's top 100 prog albums.

=== Rapid Eye Movement and Lunatic Soul ===
In October 2007, Riverside issued the album Rapid Eye Movement, once again under InsideOut. A year later, Duda launched his solo project, Lunatic Soul.

=== Anno Domini High Definition and Memories in My Head ===
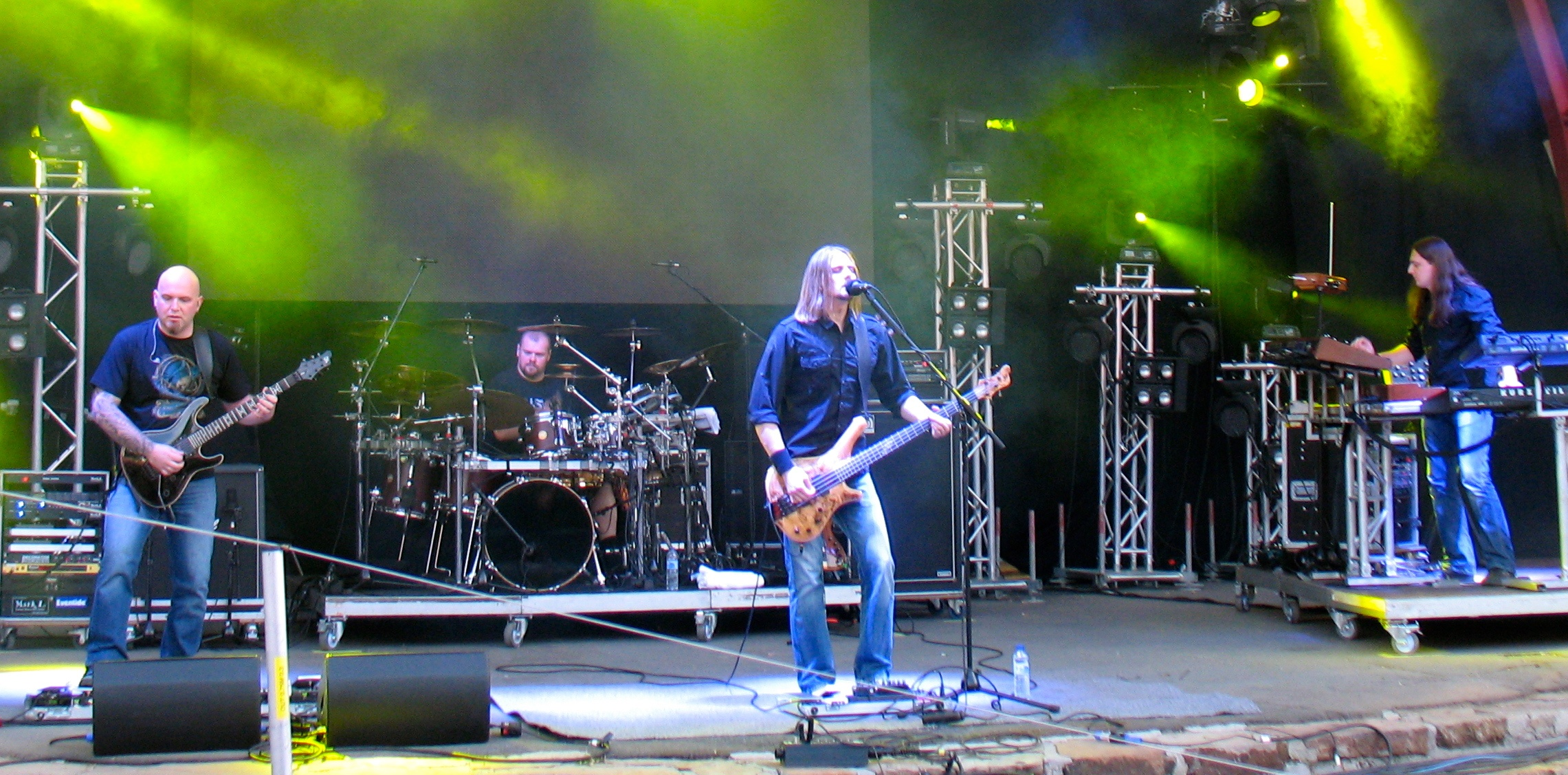
Riverside performing in 2011

The band's next album was Anno Domini High Definition, released by Mystic Production in 2009. It became the best-selling record in Poland during its second week on the charts, following a debut in sixth place. Riverside issued the EP Memories in My Head in 2011.

=== Shrine of New Generation Slaves ===
In 2013, the band published their fifth full-length album, Shrine of New Generation Slaves.

=== Love, Fear and the Time Machine, Eye of the Soundscape, and death of Grudziński ===
Their sixth album, Love, Fear and the Time Machine, came out in 2015 and reached higher peak sales outside Poland than their previous records.

On 21 February 2016, guitarist Piotr Grudziński died of sudden cardiac arrest. Riverside subsequently announced the cancellation of scheduled tour dates.

On 10 March, the band announced that a new album, a compilation of ambient and instrumental pieces, was in progress. On 21 August, the record was announced to be titled Eye of the Soundscape, and it came out on 21 October.

On 23 September, Riverside announced that they would not immediately replace Grudziński and would instead continue as a trio. On 22 February 2017, Maciej Meller (Quidam) was revealed to be the band's new touring guitarist.

=== Wasteland ===
In September 2018, Riverside released their seventh album, and their first without Grudziński, titled Wasteland. On 3 February 2020, they announced that Meller had joined the band in an official capacity and would be involved in the writing sessions for their eighth album.

=== ID.Entity, Live ID. ===
In January 2023, Riverside issued ID.Entity, which was followed by a live recording titled Live ID., in 2025.

=== Duda and Meller departures ===
In April 2026, vocalist, bassist, and main songwriter Mariusz Duda stated on social media that he would be leaving Riverside after 25 years, due to the band's internal dynamics. Following that statement, guitarist Maciej Meller also announced his departure, citing an inability to continue without Mariusz.

== Band members ==
Current

- Piotr Kozieradzki – drums, percussion (2001–present)
- Michał Łapaj – keyboards, backing vocals (2003–present)

Past

- Mariusz Duda – lead vocals, bass, acoustic guitar (2001–2026); guitars (2016–2020)
- Piotr Grudziński – guitars (2001–2016; died 2016)
- Maciej Meller – guitars (2020–2026; touring member 2017–2020)
- Jacek Melnicki – keyboards (2001–2003)

Timeline

== Discography ==
=== Studio albums ===
Title	Album details	Peak chart positions								Certifications (sales thresholds)
Title	Album details	POL	BEL (FL)	BEL (WA)	FIN	GER	NLD	SWI	UK	Certifications (sales thresholds)
Out of Myself	Released: 15 December 2003; Label: Laser's Edge, Mystic Production; Formats: CD, LP, DD	—	—	—	—	13 (Note: peaked in 2021)	—	—	—	
Second Life Syndrome	Released: 31 October 2005; Label: InsideOut, Mystic Production; Formats: CD, LP, DD	22	—	—	—	—	—	—	—	
Rapid Eye Movement	Released: 24 September 2007; Label: InsideOut, Mystic Production; Formats: CD, LP, DD	2	—	—	—	—	73	—	—	
Anno Domini High Definition	Released: 19 June 2009; Label: InsideOut, Mystic Production; Formats: CD, CD+DVD, LP, DD	1	—	—	—	94	58	—	—	POL: Gold
Shrine of New Generation Slaves	Released: 18 January 2013; Label: InsideOut, Mystic Production; Formats: CD, LP, DD	2	130	109	41	33	28	51	—	POL: Gold
Love, Fear and the Time Machine	Released: 4 September 2015; Label: InsideOut, Mystic Production; Formats: CD, LP, DD	2	73	51	25	18	4	31	67	POL: Gold
Wasteland	Released: 28 September 2018; Label: InsideOut, Mystic Production; Formats: CD, LP, DD	1	111	79	23	13	28	30	83	POL: Gold
ID.Entity	Released: 20 January 2023; Label: InsideOut, Mystic Production; Formats: CD, LP, DD	2	125	87	14	4	9	6	89	
"—" denotes a recording that did not chart or was not released in that territory.

=== EPs ===
Title	Details
Voices in My Head	Released: 7 March 2005; Label: Rock Serwis; Formats: CD, digital download
Memories in My Head	Released: 20 June 2011; Label: ProgTeam; Formats: CD, LP, digital download
Acoustic Session	Released: 29 November 2019; Label: Inside Out Music; Formats: LP, digital download

=== Live albums ===
Title	Album details
Reality Dream	Released: 26 November 2008; Label: InsideOut/Mystic Production; Formats: 2 CD, 2 LP
Lost 'n' Found – Live in Tilburg	Released: 20 April 2017; Label: Self-released; Formats: 2 CD, 3 LP, 2 CD+DVD
Wasteland Tour 2018–2020	Released: 1 December 2020; Label: Vintage Vinyl; Formats: 2 CD+DVD+BD
Live ID	Released: 24 January 2025; Label: Inside Out Music; Formats:

=== Compilations ===
Title	Album details	Peak chart positions					
Title	Album details	POL	BEL (FL)	BEL (WA)	GER	NLD	SWI
Reality Dream Trilogy	Released: 5 September 2011; Label: Mystic Production; Format: 6 CD	—	—	—	—	—	—
Eye of the Soundscape	Released: 21 October 2016; Label: InsideOutMusic; Format: CD, LP, DD	4	122	112	69	60	92
Riverside 20 – The Shorts & the Longs	Released: 19 November 2021; Label: InsideOutMusic; Format: DD, 4 CD	—	—	—	—	—	—
"—" denotes a recording that did not chart or was not released in that territory.

=== Video albums ===
Title	Album details	Peak chart positions
Title	Album details	FIN
Reality Dream	Released: 14 December 2009; Label: ProgTeam; Format: DVD	8

=== Singles ===
Year	Title	Certifications (sales thresholds)	Album
2003	"Loose Heart"		Out of Myself
2005	"Conceiving You"		Second Life Syndrome
2007	"02 Panic Room"	POL: Gold	Rapid Eye Movement
2008	"Schizophrenic Prayer"		Rapid Eye Movement
2013	"Celebrity Touch"		Shrine of New Generation Slaves
2016	"Shine/Time Travellers"		Eye of the Soundscape; Love, Fear and the Time Machine
2018	"Vale of Tears"		Wasteland
2018	"River Down Below"		Wasteland
2018	"Lament"		Wasteland
2021	"Story of My Dream"		Riverside 20 – The Shorts & the Longs
2022	"I'm Done with You"		ID.Entity
2022	"Self-Aware"		ID.Entity
2023	"Friend or Foe?"		ID.Entity
