= Piotr Grudziński =

Polish guitarist (1975–2016)

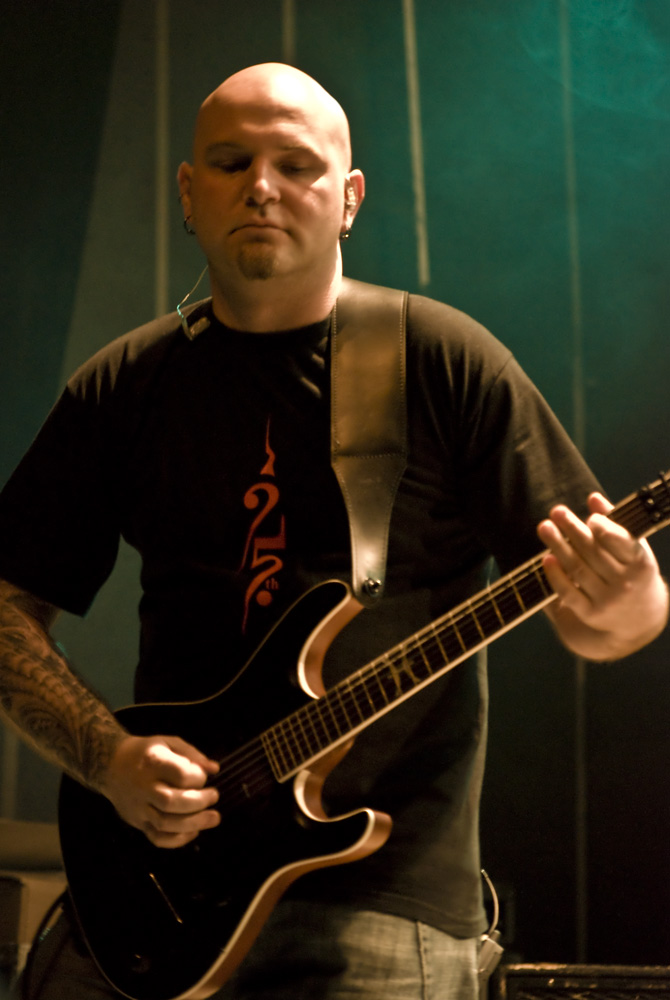
- Grudziński in 2009

Background information
- Born: 15 March 1975; Warsaw, Poland
- Died: 21 February 2016 (aged 40) Warsaw, Poland
- Genres: Progressive rock, progressive metal
- Occupation: Musician
- Instrument: Guitar
- Years active: 1993–2016
- Formerly of: Unnamed (1993–2003); Riverside (2001–2016)

Piotr Grudziński (15 March 1975 – 21 February 2016) was a Polish musician, mostly recognized as guitarist of the progressive rock band Riverside. He has also contributed to bands such as Unnamed and Groan.

Grudziński joined Riverside in 2001. He recorded six studio albums with the band: Out of Myself (2003), Second Life Syndrome (2005), Rapid Eye Movement (2007), Anno Domini High Definition (2009), Shrine of New Generation Slaves (2013), Love, Fear and the Time Machine (2015).

== Equipment ==
Piotr Grudziński was endorsed by Mayones model Setius PRO and Regius Gothic. He was also using Ibanez Jem 777 BK, Ibanez RG-470, Mesa Boogie Stereo Simul Class 2:Ninety, Marshall JMP 1-Preamp, Marshall 4x12 Cabinet 1960 AV, Mark L Midi Control System FC-25, Mark L Midi Loop & Switch LS-14, Mark L Duo Stereo Line Mixer, Mark L Power Station, ISP Decima Tor Pro Rack G, TC Electronic Stereo Reverb M 2000, Eventide Time Factor, Eventide Mod Factor, Eventide Pitch Factor, Mark L Jazz Drive, Mark L Vanilla Sky, Ibanez ts808 Mod by Mark L, MXR 10 band EQ, 2 x Ernie Ball Volume Pedal, Boss Tu-2 Tuner, Ernie Ball Tuner, Mogami Cables.

== Death ==
Grudziński died on 21 February 2016 from sudden cardiac arrest. He was buried at the Northern Communal Cemetery in Warsaw.

== Discography ==
- Unnamed – The Black Monk (1994, demo, Ceremony Records)
- Unnamed – A Beauty of Suffering a Poetry of Dreams (1997, demo, Ceremony Records)
- Unnamed – Id (2001, Apocalypse Production)
- Unnamed – Duality (2002, Apocalypse Production)
- Groan – Promo Tape '98 (1998, demo)
- Blindead – Live at Radio Gdańsk (2014, guest appearance)
- Riverside – Out of Myself (2003, Laser's Edge, Mystic Production)
- Riverside – Voices in My Head (2005)
- Riverside – Second Life Syndrome (2005, InsideOut, Mystic Production)
- Riverside – Rapid Eye Movement (2007, InsideOut, Mystic Production)
- Riverside – Reality Dream (2008)
- Riverside – Anno Domini High Definition (2009, InsideOut, Mystic Production)
- Riverside – Memories in My Head (2011)
- Riverside – Shrine of New Generation Slaves (2013, InsideOut, Mystic Production)
- Riverside – Love, Fear and the Time Machine (2015, InsideOut)
- Riverside – Eye of the Soundscape (2016, InsideOut)
