= Ron Burman =

American music executive (born 1965)

- Born: 1965 (age 60–61)
- Education: Florida State University
- Occupation: President of Mascot Label Group North America
- Years active: 1986 - Present
- Employers: Mascot Records 2013-present; Current (President)

Ron Burman (born 1965) is an American music executive.

== Early life ==
Burman was born in Philadelphia in 1965 and moved to Jacksonville, Florida when he was 12. Between 1986 and 1988, while pursuing Communication Studies at Florida State University (FSU) in Tallahassee, Burman served as the Concert Director for Student Campus Entertainment (SCE) where he booked bands for the campus nightclub, The Club Down Under, The Metro Night Club, as well as working at FSU's college radio station WVFS in Tallahassee. While head of SCE, Burman booked hundreds of bands, including the Red Hot Chili Peppers, The Ramones, Jello Biafra, Alpha Blondy, The Flaming Lips, Sonic Youth, Dinosaur Jr., Love Tractor, and many others.

Burman had a summer internship at Bulging Eye Booking & Management in Norman, Oklahoma, who managed and booked bands including The Flaming Lips, Mudhoney, the Afghan Whigs and Alice Donut, whom Burman would go on to manage for several years. He graduated from FSU in 1988 with a B.A. in communications.

== Career beginnings ==
Burman moved to New York City in 1988 to work for Associated Booking Corporation (ABC Booking), where he booked Anita Baker, B.B. King, Black Uhuru, Dr. John, The Wailers Band, Third World, and Yellowman, among others. In 1991, he founded Stretch Management, which lasted until 1996. During this time he became the personal manager and tour manager for punk rock and alternative bands, including his old clients Alice Donut, Drunken Boat and Japanese noise-punks Ultra Bidé. His bands toured several times across America, Canada, Japan, and Europe. Burman signed both Alice Donut and Ultra Bidé to Jello Biafra's independent label, Alternative Tentacles.

Following Stretch Management's closure, Burman became booker for the CMJ Music Marathon in 1996 and 1997. He gave Limp Bizkit and Rammstein their first shows in New York City.

== Roadrunner A&R ==
In 1997, Burman was hired by independent label Roadrunner Records which was beginning to expand from metal to more commercial mainstream and alternative rock. Less than two years into his career at Roadrunner, as a junior A&R executive, Burman was tipped off to two self-released albums by Vancouver band Nickelback: Curb and The State. Roadrunner signed the group and re-issued the latter album, followed by Silver Side Up (2001). Burman went on as A&R man for a further five records for the band. Burman was promoted to Senior Vice-president of A&R.

Burman also signed the Vancouver quartet Theory of a Deadman, protégés of Nickelback singer Chad Kroeger, who co-produced them through his own production company, 604 Records, together with Joey Moi. Impressed by singer Bryan Crouch, Burman signed another Canadian band: Hail the Villain from Ontario. Roadrunner re-released their first album, Population: Declining in 2010.

Other Burman Roadrunner signings include the Australian hard rock band Airbourne, whose albums Runnin’ Wild and No Guts. No Glory. both entered the American, Canadian, and British charts, as well as Black Stone Cherry, The Wombats, Madina Lake, DoubleDrive and Biffy Clyro.

== Mascot Label Group ==
In 2013, Burman became President of Mascot Label Group North America. The Dutch label has artists such as Joe Bonamassa, Gov't Mule, Volbeat, Kenny Wayne Shepherd, Jonny Lang, and Black Label Society.

After joining Mascot, Burman helped in signing Black Stone Cherry to the label, whom he had previously signed to Roadrunner. Burman has developed an international roster with artists from North America including: 10 Years, Any Given Sin, Black Stone Cherry, Calva Louise, Conquer Divide, Crobot, Dinosaur Pile-Up, Earthside, The Cold Stares, The Georgia Thunderbolts, Otherwise, P.O.D. and Shaman's Harvest.

=== All Music & Discogs ===
- 10 Years - Inner Darkness - EP 2024
- Cedric Burnside - Hill Country Love- LP- 2024
- Any Given Sin - War Within - LP - 2023
- Black Stone Cherry- Screamin’ At The Sky - LP - 2023
- Black Stone Cherry - Live From The Royal Albert Hall... Y’All! - Live LP- 2022
- Black Stone Cherry - The Human Condition - Deluxe Edition - LP- 2021
- Black Stone Cherry - The Human Condition - LP- 2020
- Black Stone Cherry - Family Tree - LP- 2018
- Black Stone Cherry - Kentucky - LP -2016
- Conquer Divide - Slow Burn - Deluxe Edition 2024
- Conquer Divide - Slow Burn LP - 2023
- The Cold Stares - The Southern - LP - 2024
- The Georgia Thunderbolts - Rise Above It All - LP - 2024
- Earthside - Let The Truth Speak - LP - 2023
- King Falcon - LP- 2023
- Oxymorrons - Melanin Punk - LP- 2023
- Otherwise - Gawdzillionaire - LP- 2023
- Crobot - Feel This - LP - 2022
- The Cold Stares - Heavy Shoes - LP- 2021
- The Georgia Thunderbolts - Can We Get A Witness - LP 2021
- Otherwise - Defy- LP- 2019
- Monster Truck - True Rockers - LP- 2018
- Galactic - Into The Deep -LP- 2015
- JJ Grey & Mofro - Ol’ Glory - LP- 2015

== Filmography ==
Burman was interviewed in the documentary film Freaks In Love by filmmakers David Koslowski and Skizz Cyzyk, covering Alice Donut's 25-year career in 2011, and additionally appeared in the VH1 TV series Metal Evolution that same year.

He was also interviewed for the 2023 documentary film Hate To love: Nickelback by Leigh Brooks.
