= In Chains =

In Chains may refer to:

- "In Chains", a 2009 song by Depeche Mode from Sounds of the Universe
- "In Chains", a 2014 song by Shaman's Harvest from Smokin' Hearts & Broken Guns
