= Applause of a Distant Crowd =

Studio album by Vola
- Released: 12 October 2018
- Recorded: 2017–2018
- Studio: Heyman Studios, Copenhagen
- Genre: Art rock; progressive rock; groove metal
- Length: 42:40
- Label: Mascot
- Producer: Asger Mygind

Vola chronology
Inmazes (2015)	Applause of a Distant Crowd (2018)	Witness (2021)

Professional ratings
Review scores
Source	Rating
Distorted Sound	9/10
Eternal Terror	5/6
Metal Temple	9/10
The Music	4/5
Rockfreaks.net	8.5/10

Applause of a Distant Crowd is the second studio album by Danish progressive metal band Vola, released on 12 October 2018 through Mascot Records.

Music videos were made for the songs "Ghosts" and "Smartfriend". The chorus for "Ghosts" was taken from an earlier demo track.

== Track listing ==
All tracks are written by Vola.

Applause of a Distant Crowd track listing
No.	Title	Length
1.	"We Are Thin Air"	4:07
2.	"Ghosts"	3:58
3.	"Smartfriend"	4:18
4.	"Ruby Pool"	4:09
5.	"Alien Shivers"	4:20
6.	"Vertigo"	4:04
7.	"Still"	4:10
8.	"Applause of a Distant Crowd"	5:35
9.	"Whaler"	5:23
10.	"Green Screen Mother"	2:36
Total length:		42:40

== Personnel ==
Vola

- Asger Mygind – lead vocals, guitar, producer
- Nicolai Mogensen – bass, backing vocals, synth
- Martin Werner – keyboards
- Adam Janzi – drums

Additional

- Andy VanDette – mixing, mastering
