= Tracer (band) =

Australian rock band

- Origin: Adelaide, South Australia, Australia
- Genres: Australian rock
- Years active: 2004–2018
- Label: Mascot/Warner
- Past members: Leigh Brown; Michael Brown; Andrew Wise; Pat Saracino; Jett Heysen Hicks
- Website: tracer-band.com

Tracer were an Australian rock trio formed in Adelaide in 2004 by Leigh Brown on bass guitar and backing vocals, his brother Michael Brown on guitar and lead vocals, and Andre Wise on drums. Leigh left in 2012 and Jett Heysen Hicks joined on bass guitar in the next year. Tracer toured Australia and Europe and had success with their second album, El Pistolero (2013), debuting in the top 10 on the BBC Rock album chart. In February 2018 the trio announced, via Facebook, that they were to disband.

== History ==
Tracer were formed in Adelaide in 2004 as an Australian rock trio by Leigh Brown on bass guitar, keyboards and backing vocals, his brother Michael Brown on guitar and lead vocals, and Andre Wise on drums and percussion. Leigh and Michael had been members of their own blues group, the Brown Brothers, when they joined with Wise to form Tracer.

In November 2006 they issued their debut three-track extended play, Into the Night. The title track was co-written by all three members. Their second EP, L.A. ?, was released in 2008; its seven tracks were recorded in May at Billy Hyde Recording Studio, Adelaide, with James Bett producing.

In 2011 Tracer supported Royal Republic on a European tour. The trio's debut studio album, Spaces in Between was released on 3 October 2011 via Cool Green Recordings/Mascot Label Group. It was recorded at Broadcast Studios and at Thunderwolf Studios, both in Adelaide, which was produced by the group, while Bett co-engineered with Evan James. Sonic Abuse's reviewer felt, "[it's] music that is well honed but with a strongly defined identity that has come from the years of touring and recording together, and the twelve tracks on offer bristle with blues-infused energy and the hedonistic spirit of rock 'n' roll." Hannah May Kilroy of Louder observed, "[they] bring together this blend of styles by specialising in big, hard rock riffs paired with powerful, catchy choruses and raw, gritty vocals, with a strong influence of blues throughout."

Leigh left early in 2012 and was temporarily replaced on bass guitar by Pat Saracino. In April of 2012 they undertook their first headlining tour of the United Kingdom. L.A. ? was remixed and reissued for the European market in August 2012. Saracino was replaced in turn by Jett Heysen Hicks on bass guitar and backing vocals late in the year. In November they were declared Best New Band in Classic Rock magazine's Roll of Honour Awards.

The band's second studio album, El Pistolero, was released in mid-2013 via Mascot Records/Warner Music Australasia. It was produced by Kevin Shirley (Iron Maiden, Led Zeppelin, Cold Chisel) at Revolver Studios, Oakland, California. Ian D Hall of Liverpool Sound and Vision gave it a rating of four stars and described how they provided, "a piece of music that combines the feel of the great classic Western with the crunching riff of classic rock, the rattlesnake in high season angered by the punishing heat coupled with the a soft serenade, the depth of Gary Cooper with the legend of Ned Kelly, brilliantly and wonderfully rolled into one big swag bag of rock payback." Loud magazine's Brian Griffin noticed their, "no frills heavy rock with healthy nods to sludge and grunge to keep things interesting... the world needs rock bands as good as this in it. If you were disappointed by Vista Chino and the latest Alice in Chains album and see Airbourne as little more than a cartoon, [this album] should put everything to rights."

Tracer's third studio album, Water for Thirsty Dogs, was issued in July 2015 by Odyssey Music Network. Emma Younger of Mosh rated it at 8.0 and explained how, "have taken their love of Stateside grunge blues, and slammed the Aussie pop-punk norm into the ground with a style that has taken off... What lies at the core of this entire record though, is passion – and that speaks volumes…literally. Every inch of its creation has been fuelled by the dare to go one better than before." Classic Rock's Emma Johnston gave them three-out-of-five stars, "[it] often leans uncomfortably close to tribute act territory, relying on cliché, and as such it lacks that spark of personality and ingenuity you find when bands are truly comfortable in their own skin. But as a love-letter to the 90s it's done its job solidly if unspectacularly." In February 2018 the trio announced, via Facebook, that they were to disband.

== Members ==
- Leigh Brown – bass guitar, backing vocals, keyboards (2004–2012)
- Michael Brown – guitar, lead vocals (2004–2018)
- Andre Wise – drums, percussion (2004–2018)
- Pat Saracino – bass guitar, backing vocals (2012–2012)
- Jett Heysen Hicks – bass guitar, backing vocals (2012–2018)

== Discography ==
=== Studio albums ===
Title	Details
Spaces in Between	Released: 3 October 2011; Label: Cool Green Recordings/Mascot Label Group (CGR 7336 2); Formats: CD, Download
El Pistolero	Released: April 2013; Label: Mascot Records (M 7407 1) / Warner Music Australasia (M74071); Formats: CD, LP, Download
Water for Thirsty Dogs	Released: 24 July 2015; Label: Odyssey Music Network (OMN15089); Formats: CD, LP, Download

=== Extended plays ===
Title	Details
Into the Night	Released: 2006; Formats: CD, Download
L.A. ?	Released: 2008; Formats: CD, Download

== Awards ==
=== Classic Rock Roll Of Honour ===
The Classic Rock Roll of Honour Awards was an annual awards program that took place from 2005 to 2016. The awards were founded by Classic Rock Magazine. Winners were chosen by the awards team and voted on by readers of the magazine.

Year	Nominee / work	Award	Result (wins only)
2012	Tracer	Best New Band	Won

=== Fowler's Live Music Awards ===
The Fowler's Live Music Awards took place from 2012 to 2014 to "recognise success and achievement over the past 12 months [and] celebrate the great diversity of original live music" in South Australia. Since 2015 they're known as the South Australian Music Awards.

Year	Nominee / work	Award	Result (wins only)
2013	Tracer	Best Rock Artist	Won
