= Inmazes =

Studio album by Vola
- Released: 2 February 2015
- Genre: Progressive metal; djent
- Length: 51:44
- Label: Mascot
- Producer: Asger Mygind

Vola chronology
Monsters (2011)	Inmazes (2015)	Applause of a Distant Crowd (2017)

Singles from Inmazes
- 1. "Gutter Moon" Released: 12 January 2015; 2. "Emily" Released: 20 March 2015; 3. "Starburn" Released: 29 June 2016; 4. "Stray the Skies" Released: 12 September 2016

Professional ratings
Review scores
Source	Rating
Distorted Sound	9/10
Melodic	5/5 stars
Metal Hammer	4/5 stars

Inmazes is the debut studio album by Danish progressive metal band Vola. The album was originally self-released on 2 February 2015. The album was re-released through Mascot Label Group on 16 September 2016.

This is the band's only studio album with original drummer Felix Ewert, who amicably left the band in 2017 to pursue other projects.

== Lyrical themes ==
According to vocalist/guitarist Asger Mygind, the lyrical themes of Inmazes deal with entrapment:

The album tries to capture this feeling of being trapped in mental mazes and not being able to fully experience happiness, basically. How is this struggle visualized in your own mind and how do your surroundings react to the behaviour caused by it.

== Track listing ==
Inmazes track listing
No.	Title	Length
1.	"The Same War"	5:10
2.	"Stray the Skies"	4:13
3.	"Starburn"	6:05
4.	"Owls"	5:51
5.	"Your Mind Is a Helpless Dreamer"	5:21
6.	"Emily"	3:01
7.	"Gutter Moon"	3:55
8.	"A Stare Without Eyes"	4:58
9.	"Feed the Creatures"	5:37
10.	"Inmazes"	7:29

== Personnel ==
Vola

- Asger Mygind – lead vocals, guitars, production, mixing
- Nicolai Mogensen – bass guitar, backing vocals
- Martin Werner – keyboards
- Felix Ewert – drums

Additional

- Jens Bogren – mastering
- Anders Thrane – artwork
