= Friend of a Phantom =

Studio album by Vola
- Released: 1 November 2024
- Recorded: 2023–2024
- Genre: Progressive metal; progressive rock; alternative rock
- Length: 40:53
- Label: Mascot

Vola chronology
Witness (2021)	Friend of a Phantom (2024)

Singles from Friend of a Phantom
- 1. "Paper Wolf" Released: 24 August 2023; 2. "Break My Lying Tongue" Released: 19 June 2024; 3. "I Don't Know How We Got Here" Released: 12 August 2024; 4. "Cannibal" Released: 19 September 2024

Professional ratings
Review scores
Source	Rating
Boolin Tunes	8.5/10
Distorted Sound	9/10
Metal Hammer	3.5/5 stars

Friend of a Phantom is the fourth studio album by Danish metal band Vola, released on 1 November 2024 through Mascot Records. The record has charted across Europe, including the Netherlands, Finland and Switzerland. The band went on tour in Europe throughout the month of the album's release.

== Track listing ==
All tracks are written by Vola.

Friend of a Phantom track listing
No.	Title	Length
1.	"Cannibal" (featuring Anders Fridén of In Flames)	5:02
2.	"Break My Lying Tongue"	3:50
3.	"We Will Not Disband"	4:25
4.	"Glass Mannequin"	3:48
5.	"Bleed Out"	6:04
6.	"Paper Wolf"	4:27
7.	"I Don't Know How We Got Here"	3:33
8.	"Hollow Kid"	4:41
9.	"Tray"	5:03
Total length:		40:53

== Personnel ==
Vola

- Asger Mygind – lead vocals, guitar
- Nicolai Mogensen – bass, synths, backing vocals
- Martin Werner – keyboards
- Adam Janzi – drums

Additional

- Anders Fridén – guest vocals on track 1

== Charts ==
Chart performance for Friend of a Phantom
Chart (2024)	Peak position
Dutch Albums (Album Top 100)	11
Finnish Albums (Suomen virallinen lista)	40
Swiss Albums (Schweizer Hitparade)	94
