= Let the Truth Speak =

Studio album by Earthside
- Released: November 17, 2023
- Genres: Progressive metal; cinematic music; post-metal
- Length: 77:31
- Label: Music Theories Recordings / Mascot Label Group
- Producers: David Castillo, Frank Sacramone, and Jamie van Dyck

Earthside chronology
A Dream in Static (2015)	Let the Truth Speak (2023)

Singles from Let the Truth Speak
- 1. "All We Knew and Ever Loved" Released: August 19, 2021; 2. "All We Knew and Ever Loved (Drum Remix)" Released: November 12, 2021; 3. "We Who Lament" Released: November 3, 2022; 4. "Let The Truth Speak" Released: August 10, 2023; 5. "Pattern of Rebirth" Released: September 28, 2023

Let the Truth Speak is the second studio album by American post-metal band Earthside. The album was released on November 17, 2023, and produced by band members Jamie van Dyck, Ben Shanbrom, and Frank Sacramone.

== Critical reception ==
Professional ratings
Review scores
Source	Rating
The Prog Mind	9.5/10
Kerrang	3/5
Blabbermouth.net	9/10

The Prog Mind rated the album 9.5/10, praising it as a maturation of their previous record, having a stronger central theme while being broader in how that theme was musically expressed. "While [A Dream in Static] was cinematic and progressive and technical, Let The Truth Speak is a haunting, atmospheric, and illustrious tapestry that is united by theme, by cinema, by visions, and by emotion. It is more singular in its thematic outreach, yet its musical expression is more diverse than the debut, and it represents the band accepting themselves for who they are on a deep level," they wrote. Sam Law, writing for Kerrang, remarked that the record may overwhelm some listeners: "For some, it'll be a thrillingly euphoric experience. For those on another wavelength sonically or thematically, it may all be a bit much."

== Track listing ==
All tracks are written by Earthside.

Let the Truth Speak track listing
No.	Title	Length
1.	"But What If We're Wrong" (featuring Sandbox Percussion)	4:30
2.	"We Who Lament" (featuring Keturah)	8:44
3.	"Tyranny" (featuring Pritam Adhikary)	8:30
4.	"Pattern of Rebirth" (featuring AJ Channer)	4:40
5.	"Watching the Earth Sink"	11:46
6.	"The Lesser Evil" (featuring Larry Braggs and Sam Gendell)	10:59
7.	"Denial's Aria" (featuring Keturah, VikKe, and Duo Scorpio)	5:26
8.	"Vespers" (featuring Gennady Tkachenko-Papizh and VikKe)	2:41
9.	"Let the Truth Speak" (featuring Daniel Tompkins and Gennady Tkachenko-Papizh)	10:47
10.	"All We Knew and Ever Loved" (featuring Baard Kolstad)	9:19
Total length:		77:31

== Personnel ==
Credits adapted from the album's liner notes.

Earthside

- Ben Shanbrom – drums, percussion, backing vocals
- Frank Sacramone – Grand piano, keyboards, programming
- Ryan Griffin – bass
- Jamie van Dyck – electric and acoustic Guitars, orchestration, backing vocals

Additional vocalists

- Keturah – guest vocals on tracks 2 and 7
- Pritam Adhikary – guest vocals on track 3
- AJ Channer – guest vocals on track 4
- Larry Braggs – guest vocals on track 6
- VikKe – guest vocals on tracks 7 and 8
- Gennady Tkachenko-Papizh – guest vocals on tracks 8 and 9
- Daniel Tompkins – guest vocals on track 9

Additional instrumentalists

- Sandbox Percussion – instrumentalists on track 1
- Sam Gendell – saxophone on track 6
- Duo Scorpio – harpists on track 7
- Baard Kolstad – drums on track 10

Additional personnel

- Co-produced by band members Jamie van Dyck, Ben Shanbrom, and Frank Sacramone
- Produced by Forrester Savell (bass)
- Produced by Greg Thomas (guitars and vocals) at Silver Bullet Studios
- Produced by David Castillo (guitars and synths) at Ghost Ward
- Produced by Greg Pliska (orchestra)
- Tracks 1, 3, 4, and 7 mixed by Ben Gross at The Mix Room. Mix Assistant: Paul Pavao
- Tracks 2, 5, 6, 9 mixed by Forrester Savell
- Track 8 mixed by Frank Sacramone and Jamie van Dyck
- Track 10 mixed by Randy Staub at The Warehouse Studio
- Mastered by Ted Jensen at Sterling Sound

Imagery

- Travis Smith – cover artist
