= Rod MacSween =

Rod MacSween is the founder and CEO of International Talent Booking (ITB). He was known for bringing artists such as: The Who, Pink Floyd and Robert Plant’s Band of Joy to the University of Exeter. While studying there, in 1969, he was elected social secretary of the Students Guild.

== Biography ==
MacSween was born in Southampton, England to parents were both academics.

== Recognition ==
In 2015, MacSween received a Classic Rock Roll of Honor (VIP) Award. In 2019 the academic institution awarded him with an honorary doctorate degree for his contribution to the music world. Other artists he has represented over the years include: Aerosmith, Black Sabbath, Bon Jovi (and Kiss), Def Leppard, Guns N' Roses, Lenny Kravitz, Maroon 5, Ozzy Osbourne, Pearl Jam, The Scorpions, Tool and The Who.
