= Tha Funk Capital of the World =

Studio album by Bootsy Collins
- Released: April 26, 2011
- Recorded: 2010–2011
- Genre: Funk, hip hop
- Label: Mascot
- Producer: Bootsy Collins

Bootsy Collins chronology
The Official Boot-Legged-Bootsy-CD (2009)	Tha Funk Capital of the World (2011)	World Wide Funk (2017)

Tha Funk Capital of the World is the fourteenth studio album by American funk musician Bootsy Collins, released on April 26, 2011, by Mascot Records. It features Chuck D, Snoop Dogg, and Bootsy's one time Parliament and P-Funk bandmates George Clinton and Bernie Worrell, among others. The album has one single: "Don't Take My Funk", featuring Catfish Collins and Bobby Womack.

== Critical reception ==
Professional ratings
Review scores
Source	Rating
AllMusic	3.5/5 stars
The Guardian	4/5 stars

The album has been generally well received. Metacritic reported an overall rating of 68, with six "positive" and five "mixed" reviews. Daniel Ross of the BBC said the album was "waking up a new generation to funk’s heritage", though he said that all the cameos made the album feel "sluggish and bloated at times". Betty Clarke of The Guardian reported that the album was "as close to the Mothership as it gets".

== Track listing ==
By AllMusic and Music Thread.

No.	Title	Writer(s)	Length
1.	"Spreading Hope Like Dope" (Intro)	Bootsy Collins	1:40
2.	"Hip Hop @ Funk U" (featuring Ice Cube, Snoop Dogg and Chuck D)	Bootsy Collins, O. Jackson, Donald Moore, Snoop Dogg, Bernie Worrell	4:10
3.	"Mirrors Tell Lies" (featuring Jimi Hendrix)	Bootsy Collins, Ron Jennings	5:10
4.	"JB–Still the Man" (featuring Rev. Al Sharpton)	Bootsy Collins, Sally Dorsey, Tamah Dorsey, Rev. Al Sharpton	4:30
5.	"Freedumb" (featuring Dr. Cornel West)	Bootsy Collins, Dr. Cornel West	4:04
6.	"After These Messages" (featuring Samuel L. Jackson)	Bootsy Collins, Frank Waddy, Samuel L. Jackson, Joel Johnson	4:53
7.	"Kool Whip" (featuring Phil Ade and iCandice)	Bootsy Collins, Phil Ade', Morris Mingo	4:13
8.	"The Real Deal" (featuring Sheila E. and iCandice)	Bootsy Collins, Candice Cheatham, Joel Johnson	3:54
9.	"Don't Take My Funk" (featuring Catfish Collins and Bobby Womack)	Bootsy Collins, Catfish Collins, Bobby Womack	5:24
10.	"If Looks Could Kill" (featuring Béla Fleck, Zionplanet-10 and Dennis Chambers)	Bootsy Collins, Pete Roberts	4:06
11.	"Minds Under Construction" (featuring Buckethead and (Z-Class))	Bootsy Collins, Buckethead, Summer Hughes	6:37
12.	"Siento Bombo" (featuring Olvido Ruiz and Ouiwey)	Bootsy Collins, William Johnson, Olvido Ruiz	4:02
13.	"Jazz Greats (A Tribute to Jazz)" (featuring George Duke and Ron Carter)	Bootsy Collins, Ron Carter, Johnny Davis, George Duke, Claude von Stroke	3:57
14.	"Garry Shider Tribute" (featuring George Clinton and Linda Shider)	Bootsy Collins, George Clinton, Linda Shider	3:29
15.	"Stars Have No Names (They Just Shine)" (featuring Nick Arnold and Chrissy Dunn)	Bootsy Collins, Nick Arnold, Chrissy Dunn	5:10
16.	"Chocolate Caramel Angel" (featuring Faith Daniels, Ronni Racket and Casper)	Bootsy Collins, Ron Jennings	6:57
17.	"Yummy, I Got the Munchies" (featuring Musiq Soulchild, Razzberry Hershey and Tom Joyner)	Bootsy Collins, Musiq Soulchild, Razzberry White	7:02

== Notes ==
- Bootsy announced a world tour starting on May 3, 2011, on the back of the album, encompassing the United States, Canada, the Netherlands, and Switzerland.
- A limited edition copy of the album was released with an "eye-popping" 3-D holographic cover, making the album seem "alive", according to Bootsy.
