= Witness (Vola album) =

Studio album by Vola
- Released: 21 May 2021
- Recorded: 2020
- Genre: Progressive metal; progressive rock
- Length: 44:11
- Label: Mascot
- Producer: Asger Mygind

Vola chronology
Applause of a Distant Crowd (2018)	Witness (2021)	Friend of a Phantom (2024)

Singles from Witness
- 1. "Head Mounted Sideways" Released: 19 November 2020; 2. "Straight Lines" Released: 4 February 2021; 3. "24 Light-Years" Released: 11 March 2021; 4. "These Black Claws" Released: 6 May 2021

Professional ratings
Review scores
Source	Rating
Distorted Sound	9/10

Witness is the third studio album by Danish metal band Vola, released on 21 May 2021 through Mascot Records. The record became their first top-ten album on the UK Rock Albums chart, and charted across Europe, including Germany, Finland and Switzerland. It was elected by Loudwire as the 17th best rock/metal album of 2021.

== Track listing ==
All tracks are written by Vola.

No.	Title	Length
1.	"Straight Lines"	4:22
2.	"Head Mounted Sideways"	5:34
3.	"24 Light-Years"	4:32
4.	"These Black Claws" (feat. Shahmen)	5:52
5.	"Freak"	4:50
6.	"Napalm"	4:58
7.	"Future Bird"	4:35
8.	"Stone Leader Falling Down"	4:23
9.	"Inside Your Fur"	5:00
Total length:		44:11

== Personnel ==
Vola

- Asger Mygind – lead vocals, guitar, producer
- Nicolai Mogensen – bass, backing vocals, synth
- Martin Werner – keyboards
- Adam Janzi – drums

Additional

- Shahmen – electronics and rap vocals on track 4
- Jacob Hansen – mixing, mastering
- Jakob Herrmann – drum engineer
- Gregor Huber – cover

== Charts ==
Chart (2020)	Peak position
Finnish Albums (Suomen virallinen lista)	44
German Albums (Offizielle Top 100)	52
Dutch Albums (Album Top 100)	76
Swiss Albums (Schweizer Hitparade)	90
UK Independent Albums (OCC)	25
UK Rock & Metal Albums (OCC)	7
