= Gennady Tkachenko-Papizh =

Russian actor and singer (born 1964)

- Геннадий Ткаченко-Папиж
- Born: 27 January 1964 (age 62); Petropavlovsk, Kazakh SSR, Soviet Union
- Education: Kyiv Municipal Academy of Variety and Circus Arts; Russian State Institute of Performing Arts
- Occupations: Singer; actor; vocal imitator

Gennady Tkachenko-Papizh (Russian: Геннадий Ткаченко-Папиж; born 27 January 1964) is a singer, actor and vocal imitator. He worked with Theatre Buff in Leningrad and won the All-Union Competition of Variety Artists in 1987. His screen credits include Kira Muratova's 1994 film Passions and the television drama Po imeni Baron.

Tkachenko-Papizh is known for vocal performances in which he imitates birds, insects, water and other sounds from nature, combining them with singing and improvisation. A video of his 2016 performance on Georgia's Got Talent circulated widely online. He subsequently appeared in several national editions of the Got Talent franchise. In 2023, 20 minutos described him as the contestant who had accumulated the most Golden Buzzers in the format, citing awards in Georgia, Germany, Romania and Greece. He also contributed vocals to Earthside's 2023 album Let the Truth Speak.

== Early life and education ==
Tkachenko-Papizh was born in Petropavlovsk, then in the Kazakh SSR (now Kazakhstan), in 1964.

The New York Times reported that as a child he imitated musical instruments such as the guitar and ukulele and learned to produce sounds using both his mouth and nose.

Ruskino lists him as graduating from the Kyiv State School of Variety and Circus Arts in 1983 and from the musical-theatre department of the St. Petersburg State Academy of Theatre Arts, now the Russian State Institute of Performing Arts, in 2000. The New York Times reported that his training also included circus arts, drama and the bel canto method.

In a 2014 interview with Fakty, Tkachenko-Papizh said that "Papizh" was the surname of his maternal great-grandfather.

== Career ==
=== Theatre and screen work ===
After graduating in Kyiv in 1983, Tkachenko-Papizh worked at Theatre Buff in Leningrad until 1989. In 1987, he received first prize in the spoken-word category at the eighth All-Union Competition of Variety Artists for the act «Конферансье-робот».

His screen credits include the 1989 television musical film Muzykalnye igry and Kira Muratova's 1994 film Passions. From 1996 to 1998, he worked at the Saint Petersburg Comedy Theatre and later with the theatrical project Papizh-Club. He also played Django in the television drama Po imeni Baron. The New York Times reported that he had also worked alongside Slava Polunin.

=== Germany and stage work ===
In 2014, Fakty reported that Tkachenko-Papizh had moved to Germany eleven years earlier and was living in Berlin. In the same interview, he said that performances for Russian-speaking audiences in Germany led to professional contracts and that he continued to tour outside Germany.

That year, he played the Fool in V nash vek sleptsam bezumtsy vozhaki (В наш век слепцам безумцы вожаки), a production based on Shakespeare's King Lear and Hamlet that was presented at the Taganka Theatre in Moscow. During the 2016–17 New Year season, he played Chronos in Masha and the Bear + Three Bogatyrs (Маша и Медведь + Три богатыря) at Crocus City Hall in Moscow.

=== Television competitions ===
In 2014, Tkachenko-Papizh reached the final of the sixth season of Ukraine's Got Talent as one of nine finalists. In 2016, he competed on Georgia's Got Talent; ITV later identified him as a semifinalist. The New York Times reported in May 2016 that a widely shared copy of his performance had received more than 70 million views and more than 100,000 comments.

In 2018, Tkachenko-Papizh competed on the German series Das Supertalent, where judge Bruce Darnell awarded him a Golden Buzzer, sending him directly to the final. In 2019, he appeared on Britain's Got Talent: The Champions.

In 2020, he competed in the tenth season of the Romanian series Românii au talent. PRO TV reported that he received a Golden Buzzer and reached the final. In 2022, he was one of twelve finalists on Greece's Got Talent. 20 minutos later reported that his Greek appearance was one of four national editions in which he had received a Golden Buzzer.

In 2023, Tkachenko-Papizh appeared on the Spanish competition Got Talent: All-Stars. In coverage published before his appearance, 20 minutos described him as the contestant who had accumulated the most Golden Buzzers in the Got Talent format, citing awards in Germany, Greece, Romania and Georgia.

=== Music ===
In its 2016 profile, The New York Times reported that nature-sound imitation had not been a central part of Tkachenko-Papizh's earlier repertory and that he generally preferred improvisation to fixed rehearsal in these vocal performances.

Tkachenko-Papizh contributed vocals to two tracks on Earthside's 2023 album Let the Truth Speak: "Vespers", with VikKe, and the title track, with Daniel Tompkins of Tesseract.
