= World Wide Funk =

Studio album by Bootsy Collins
- Released: October 26, 2017
- Recorded: 2016–2017
- Length: 71:32
- Label: Mascot
- Producer: Bootsy Collins, DJ Quik, Snoop Dogg

Bootsy Collins chronology
Tha Funk Capital of the World (2011)	World Wide Funk (2017)

Professional ratings
Aggregate scores
Source	Rating
Metacritic	70/100
Review scores
Source	Rating
Exclaim!	7/10
The Independent	4/5 stars
Slant Magazine	3.5/5 stars

World Wide Funk is the 15th studio album by former Parliament-Funkadelic bassist Bootsy Collins. The album was released on October 26, 2017—Collins' 66th birthday—by Mascot Records and was made available on CD, 180G "Splatter" vinyl, and digital download. The album features diverse musical collaborations with artists such as Stanley Clarke, Victor Wooten, Chuck D, Big Daddy Kane, Doug E. Fresh, Eric Gales, Musiq Soulchild, Buckethead, Dennis Chambers, Kali Uchis, and the late P-Funk keyboardist, Bernie Worrell.

== Track listing ==
Side A
No.	Title	Writer(s)	Featuring	Length
1.	"World Wide Funk"	A. Benveniste, B. Collins, D. E. "Doug E. Fresh" Davis	Doug E. Fresh, Buckethead & Alissia Benveniste	5:19
2.	"Bass-Rigged-System"	B. Collins, K. Cheatham	Victor Wooten, Stanley Clarke, Manou Gallo, Alissia Benveniste & World-Wide-Funkdrive	4:17
3.	"Pusherman"	A. Thompson, B. Collins, B. Chambers, D. "Dru Down" Robinson, J. Lofton, J. "NofacE Shadowmen" Steel, O. Collins	Dru Down, Blvckseeds & Mr. Talkbox	6:30
4.	"Thera-P"	A. Benveniste, B. Collins, T. Colquitt	Tyshawn Colquitt & Alissia Benveniste	3:45

Side B
No.	Title	Writer(s)	Featuring	Length
1.	"Hot Saucer"	J. Gilmore; A. Benveniste, A. "Big Daddy Kane" Hardy, B. Collins, E. Moore, M. Granger, R. Murph, T. "Musiq Soulchild" Johnson	Musiq Soulchild & Big Daddy Kane	4:54
2.	"Heaven Yes"	A. Benveniste, B. Collins, G. Cooper		4:21
3.	"Ladies Nite"	B. Graham; A. "MC Eiht" Taylor, A. Thompson, B. Collins, C. Houston, D.M. "DJ Quick" Blake, J. Jumanji, S. "Domino" Ivy	MC Eiht & Blvckseeds	4:05
4.	"Candy Coated Lover"	B. Collins, K. Uchis, P. "ChewFu" Kardolus, Z. Adams	X-Zact, Kali Uchis & World-Wide-Funkdrive	3:47

Side C
No.	Title	Writer(s)	Featuring	Length
1.	"Snow Bunny"	B. Collins, M. Mingo, T. Colquitt, Z. Adams	Tyshawn Colquitt, Snowbunny & World-Wide-Funkdrive	4:15
2.	"Hi-On-Heels"	B. Collins, C. C. "Snoop Dog" Broadus Jr., O Collins	October London	3:02
3.	"A Salute to Bernie"	B. Worrell, B. Collins	Dr. G. Bernie Worrell	5:15
4.	"Boomerang"	B. Collins, J. Johnson, Z. Adams	Justin Johnson (14)	3:04

Side D
No.	Title	Writer(s)	Featuring	Length
1.	"Worth My While"	B. Collins, J. Williams, K. Uchis	Kali Uchis	5:27
2.	"Come Back Bootsy"	B. Collins, F. Waddy, G. Cooper, Justin Johnson (14), Z. Adams	Eric Gales, Dennis Chambers & World-Wide-Funkdrive	7:20
3.	"Illusions"	J. Jackson; A. Thompson, B. Collins, C. Houston, C.D. "Chuck D" Ridenhour, E. Gales, J. Lofton, S. Imani, T. Donohue, T. Colquitt	Chuck D, Buckethead & Blvckseeds	6:06

== Charts ==
Chart (2018)	Peak position
Belgian Albums (Ultratop Flanders)	199
