= Demydivka =

Rural locality in Rivne Oblast, Ukraine

Demydivka Демидівка
- Rural settlement
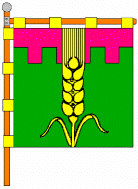
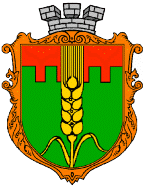
- Flag Coat of arms

- Location within Rivne Oblast Location within Ukraine
- Coordinates: 50°25′00″N 25°20′00″E
- Country: Ukraine
- Oblast: Rivne Oblast
- Raion: Dubno Raion
- Hromada: Demydivka settlement hromada

Area
  - Total: 16.89 km^{2} (6.52 sq mi)

Population (2022)
  - Total: 2,440
- Postal code: 35200

Demydivka (Ukrainian: Демидівка; Polish: Demidówka) is a rural settlement in Rivne Oblast, Ukraine. It was the administrative center of Demydivka Raion within the oblast until the raion was abolished in 2020. The settlement is located 40 kilometres (25 mi) from the railway station on the Dubno-Krasne-Zdolbuniv line.

Demydivka is located on both banks of a small Zhabychi River, 80 kilometres (50 mi) from Rivne and 35 kilometres (22 mi) from the Dubno railway station. Dubliany and Lishnya are subordinated to Demydivka's village council.

Since the formation of the Rivne Oblast, Demydivka has been one of its regional centers.

== History ==
Historical affiliations

Polish–Lithuanian Commonwealth 1570–1795
Russian Empire 1795–1917
Ukrainian People's Republic/Ukrainian State 1917-1919
Second Polish Republic 1919–1945
Soviet Union 1939–1941 (occupation)
Nazi Germany 1941–1944 (occupation)
Soviet Union 1944–1945 (occupation)
Soviet Union 1945–1991
Ukraine 1991–present

Archaeological findings (such as stone axes and hammers) indicate that these lands have been inhabited since the Bronze Age. Also, Roman coins of the 3rd century has been found, and the remains of an ancient town are preserved. In the village of Lishnya, which is located two kilometers from Demydivka, traces of the ancient ruins of the castle have been preserved. The territory where a castle was situated is called Zamchysko.

The town was first mentioned in 1570, and it was called Demydiv then. At the beginning of 17th century, Demydiv was a small village, which belonged to several landlords. In 1629, it consisted of 21 houses. During the liberation war of 1648–1654, the people of towns and villages along the rivers Styr and Ikva struggled against Polish noblemen oppression. Farmers in the fields between Demydivka and Berestechko are still finding weapons and personal belongings of the Cossacks.

Demydivka remained under the Poland dominion. After the Treaty of Perpetual Peace in the 1686, the situation worsened. The amount of the serfdom was, on average, 5–6 days a week. In addition, farmers had come to zazhynky, obzhynky (kinds of public work), and pay chynsh (a special kind of tax). During the 18th century, a lot of rebellions took place. Inhabitants of Demydivka also took part in insurrectional movement. In 1702, residents of Demydivka gave support to the rebels.

The population of Demydivka grew very slowly. In 1775, there were around 43 houses. At the time of the census in 1797, there were 679 inhabitants, which made Demydivka a town. Part of the inhabitants engaged in making handicrafts. In 1795, Demydivka became a part of the Russian Empire. Until 1860, it was possession of landlords Harchynski. Later, it became the property of the State Treasury.

Demydivka's workers had to work hard even after the abolition of serfdom. Each able-bodied person had to cultivate 6 "morgs" (3.5 hectares) of land, that was almost unsuitable for the agricultural use. Farmers had to pay double the real cost for that land. Inhabitants of Demydivka did not suffer just from social oppression, in 1870 and 1873, there were two conflagrations, which burned 76 houses. Only 53 houses remained. Most of victims of the conflagrations were forced to leave their houses, seek livelihoods, and start again from nothing.

Demydivka restored very slowly. At the time of the census in 1897, there were 679 inhabitants. In the late 19th and early 20th century, several small enterprises opened. There was a sawmill and four small factories. A big fair in Demydivka happened three times a year. The revolutionary events of 1905–1907 found repercussions in Demydivka, too. There was rebellion, and conflicts with the police took place. Peasants attacked the officers' houses, shouting, "Bloodsuckers! bribetakers! out with police! get out!". There were no mail, medical, cultural and educational institutions in Demydivka. Only in 1913 was a school opened, but not all children had the opportunity to study there.

In early September 1915, Demydivka was occupied by the Austro-Hungarian troops. The Russian 8th Army, under General Aleksei Brusilov, liberated the town on September 10. Until 1942, Demydivka was inhabited mainly by Jews. During Operation Barbarossa, the raion was occupied by Nazi German troops. During this period, thousands of people were killed. According to the Soviet State Extraordinary Commission, in October 1942, 600 Jews were shot and buried in a pit that had been dug before the shooting.

In 1962, Demydivka Raion was broken up and Demydivka became a part of Mlynivsky raion. In 1996, Demydivka Raion was renewed. Now there is a school, a hospital, a canning factory and a lot of private enterprises.

Until 26 January 2024, Demydivka was designated urban-type settlement. On this day, a new law entered into force which abolished this status, and Demydivka became a rural settlement.

== Notable residents ==
- Domiy (Mariia Dovhaiuk; born 2002), Ukrainian singer, musician, author and performer of her own songs
