= Red Hands Black Deeds =

Studio album by Shaman's Harvest
- Released: July 28, 2017
- Genre: Hard rock, post-grunge, alternative rock, southern rock
- Length: 47:30
- Label: Mascot Label Group
- Producer: Keith Armstrong

Shaman's Harvest chronology
Smokin' Hearts & Broken Guns (2014)	Red Hands Black Deeds (2017)	Rebelator (2022)

Singles from Red Hands Black Deeds
- 1. "The Come Up" Released: July 15, 2017; 2. "The Devil in Our Wake" Released: February 21, 2018

Red Hands Black Deeds is the sixth studio album by the American hard rock band Shaman's Harvest. It was released on July 28, 2017, through Mascot Label Group.

== Track listing ==
No.	Title	Length
1.	"Red Hands Black Deeds (Prelude)"	2:13
2.	"Broken Ones"	3:38
3.	"The Come Up"	3:27
4.	"A Longer View"	4:06
5.	"Soul Crusher"	3:56
6.	"Off the Tracks"	3:12
7.	"Long Way Home"	4:15
8.	"The Devil in Our Wake"	4:32
9.	"Blood Trophies"	5:06
10.	"So Long"	3:02
11.	"Tusk and Bone"	4:00
12.	"Scavengers"	6:02
Total length:		47:30

== Charts ==
Chart (2017)	Peak position
US Independent Albums (Billboard)	9
US Top Album Sales (Billboard)	56
US Top Hard Rock Albums (Billboard)	20
US Heatseekers Albums (Billboard)	1
