= Polina Dashkova (singer) =

Ukrainian singer (born 2004)

- Поліна Дашкова
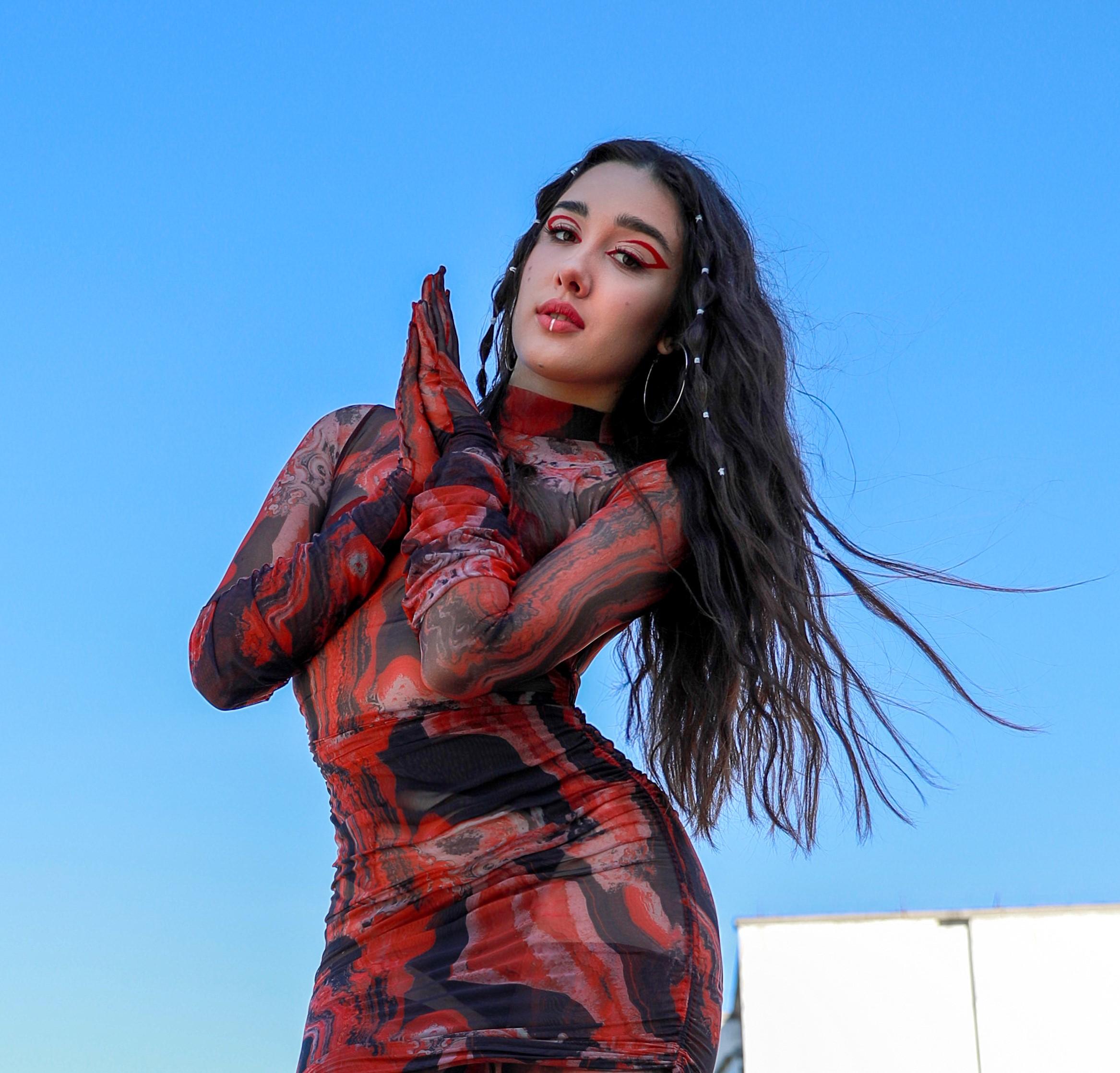
- Born: Поліна Дашкова (Polina Dashkova); 28 January 2004 (age 22); Kyiv
- Education: Kyiv Municipal Academy of Variety and Circus Arts
- Occupation: Singer
- Style: Pop

Polina Dashkóva (Ukrainian: Поліна Дашкова, born January 28, 2004) is a Ukrainian singer. She was a finalist in the song festival Українська пісня (English: Ukrainian Song), a participant in the children's festival Чорноморські ігри (English: Black Sea Games), and the Ukrainian selection for the Junior Eurovision Song Contest 2016.

== Musical career ==
Polina Dashkova has been involved in singing and dancing since early childhood. From 3 to 15, she was a dancer in the Ensemble of Folk Dances Україна (Ukraine).

In 2016, Dashkova represented Ukraine in the national selection for the Junior Eurovision Song Contest with the song До Бога (English: "To God"). A music video for the song was published on the Ukrainian YouTube channel ELLO.

That same year, she performed at the televised event Музична платформа 2016 (English: Music Platform 2016) in Kyiv. In September 2019, she participated in a commemorative concert honoring Ukrainian composer and producer Mykola Mozghovyi. In March 2021, Dashkova took part in the Easter-themed theatrical performance Хресна дорога (English: The way of the cross) at the International Children's Center Артек.

During the summer of 2021, she performed at the national children's music festival Чорноморські ігри (English: Black Sea Games). On 7 February 2022, Dashkova performed at the charity dinner event Врятуй дитяче життя (English: "Save the Child's Life"), which took place in Kyiv and aimed to support children's health initiatives.

== Career during the Russian invasion ==
Prior to the onset of the Russian invasion of February 2022, Dashkova began working on her debut single Плакала калина (English: "The Viburnum Cried"). Although production of the track began earlier, it was not released until 7 April 2022. Two remixes of the song were also released—one by Shnaps and another by Slavko. The song became popular, receiving significant airplay on Ukrainian radio stations and appearing on national music charts. As of 10 September 2023, the total number of views for the song on YouTube exceeded 10 million.

On 23 July 2022, she performed at the charity marathon concert У єдності – сила (English: Unity is Strength) held in Kyiv. On 13 October 2022, Dashkova released the single Хустинка (English: "Handkerchief"), a dedication to Ukrainian defenders and the loved ones awaiting their return. The song was accompanied by an official music video. On 27 November 2022, she performed the national anthem of Ukraine during the charity football match Футбол заради перемоги (English: "Football for Victory") in Uzhhorod. She also participated in the match itself, alongside other Ukrainian show-business figures and professional football players.

== Charity work ==
Dashkova has been actively involved in numerous charity events organized under the initiative Амбасадор дитинства (English: "Ambassador of Childhood"). As part of this initiative, she has performed, or made public appearances, at events aimed at supporting children and families affected by the war and other crises. Her participation in "Ambassador of Childhood" events has included engagements in several Ukrainian cities, such as Kyiv, Khmelnytskyi, Uzhhorod, Lutsk, and Ivano-Frankivsk. These efforts have contributed to cultural and emotional support for children in war-affected regions of Ukraine.

In addition to her musical career, Dashkova underwent tactical military training and publicly encouraged others in Ukraine to do the same.

== Performances and releases in 2023 ==
In January 2023, Dashkova performed in the liberated city of Balaklia as part of the cultural initiative of the Разом! (English: "Together!") association movement. On 1 March 2023, she released the track З тобою спокійно (English: "I'm Calm When I'm With You") in collaboration with singer Dima Prokopov. As of 10 September 2023, the track ranked 99th in the Top 100 Music Videos Ukraine chart on YouTube.

On 4 March 2023, Dashkova took part in the charity art event Пророки Перемоги (English: "Prophets of Victory"), held in honor of the anniversary of Taras Shevchenko's birth. On 18 March 2023, she performed at the Braveua Fest charity music festival in Kyiv, which raised donations for the Armed Forces of Ukraine.

Dashkova appeared on stage again in Kyiv on 7 April 2023 at the Музика війни (English: "Music of War") charity concert in support of Ukrainian military personnel. Later that month, on 21 April 2023, she performed at a charity concert in Warsaw, Poland. The event raised funds to support Ukrainian refugees from occupied territories. On 10 May 2023, Dashkova performed as a special guest at a concert headlined by Ukrainian singer Ptashkin.

On 18 July 2023, she released the single Знаєш, мамо (English: "You Know, Mother"), accompanied by a music video that, according to the artist, was filmed in a single continuous take. On 16 August 2023, Dashkova was nominated for a Muzvar Music Award in the category Найкращі нові імена естради (English: "Best New Pop Names").

In 2023, Dashkova reached the finals of the national music competition Українська пісня (English: "Ukrainian Song"), where she performed live in Lviv on 17 June.

== Videography ==
=== 2022 ===
- October 14 — Хустинка" ("Handkerchief") on YouTube

=== 2023 ===
- July 19 — "Знаєш, мамо" ("You know, Mom") on YouTube
