= The Georgia Thunderbolts =

American rock band

- Origin: Rome, Georgia, U.S.
- Genres: Hard rock; southern rock
- Years active: 2015–Present
- Labels: Mascot Records; Mascot Label Group
- Members: TJ Lyle; Riley Couzzourt; Logan Tolbert; Zach Everett; Bristol Perry
- Website: georgiathunderbolts.com

The Georgia Thunderbolts are an American rock band from Rome, Georgia. Formed in 2015, the band released their debut album Can We Get a Witness through Mascot Records in 2021.

== History ==
The band began with high school classmates Couzzourt and Perry before growing to include Everett. The group then began touring by opening up for artists such as Black Stone Cherry, The Kentucky Headhunters, and Blackberry Smoke. They're managed by Richard Young of the Headhunters. After a performance caught the attention of Mascot Label Group's North American President Ron Burman, the group was immediately signed to the label. The group released their self-titled debut EP in 2020, which was covered by Rolling Stone Magazine and Classic Rock Magazine. Shortly thereafter, the band's performance at Americanafest was chosen by Wide Open Country as one of the best moments of the festival.

Their debut album Can We Get A Witness was released on October 15, 2021, through Mascot Records. No Depression wrote favorably about the project, calling it "a good one from some up-and-coming good ol' boys looking for a sweet home of their own." The single "Be Good To Yourself" was selected by both Rolling Stone Magazine and Classic Rock Magazine as one of the best songs of the week. To support the album, they opened for Black Stone Cherry on their fall US tour, and also performed a session for Paste Magazine.

== Discography ==
Albums

- Southern Rock from Rome (2019)
- Can We Get A Witness (2021)
- Rise Above it All (2024)

EPs

- The Georgia Thunderbolts (2020)

Singles

- "Lend A Hand"
- "Looking For A Friend"
- "Take It Slow"
- "Be Good To Yourself"
- "It's Alright"
- "Can I Get A Witness"
