= Creepmime =

Dutch death metal band, 1991–1997

- Origin: Leiden, Netherlands
- Genres: Death metal
- Years active: 1991–1997
- Label: Mascot Records

Creepmime were a Dutch death metal band active from 1991 to 1997, and recorded two full-length albums, both on Mascot Records.

== History ==
The band was formed in 1991 in Leiden, eventually settling on a line-up consisting of Rogier Hakkaart, Andy Judd, Marja Koelewijn, en Gerrit Koekebakker. In February 1992, the band recorded a metal demo titled Anthems for a Doomed Youth, which led to a record deal with Mascot Records. In August 1993, after the rhythm section was replaced, the debut album Shadows was recorded. Creepmime played in support of Cynic in the Netherlands and briefly toured the Netherlands with them.

In 1994 and 1995 more line-up changes followed, but in August 1995 Creepmime recorded their second album, Chiaroscuro. The release was followed by a three-week European tour with countrymates Sinister, followed by a Dutch tour with Threnody and Ministry of Terror. After the departure of Andy Judd, the band fell apart.

In 1997, Giezen, Van der Graaf, and Brama restarted Creepmime and started writing new songs. However, due to a knee injury suffered by Brama, the band collapsed again in 1998.

== Band members ==
- Andy Judd - guitar (1991–1996)
- Rogier Hakkaart - guitar, vocals (1991–1994)
- Marja Koelewijn - bass (1991–1992)
- Gerrit Koekebakker - drums (1991–1992)
- Frank Brama - drums (1992–1998)
- Mark Hope - bass (1993–1994)
- Joost van der Graaf - bass, vocals (1994–1998)
- Jaco Voorzaat - guitar (1994)
- Aad Giezen - guitar (1995–1998)

== Discography ==
=== Anthems for a Doomed Youth (1992) ===
Anthems for a Doomed Youth was Creepmime's first and only demo, recorded in 1992, and contains five songs in doom metal style.

=== Shadows (1993) ===
In August 1993, Creepmime recorded Shadows, a more death metal-oriented album although retaining some doom metal elements. The album was produced by Patrick Mameli (of fellow Dutch death metal band Pestilence), and released by Mascot Records in 1993. It was released in the United States in 1994 by Pavement Music.

==== Track listing ====
1. "The Fruits of Ill Virtue"
2. "A Serenade for the Tragic"
3. "Suffer the Shadows"
4. "The Way of All Flesh"
5. "Chinese Whispers"
6. "Soon Ripe, Soon Rotten"
7. "Gather the Shattered"
8. "My Soul Flayed Bare"

=== Chiaroscuro (1995) ===
Chiaroscuro was Creepmime's second and last album, recorded and released by Mascot Records in 1995, and sees the band move toward playing melodic death metal.

==== Track listing ====
1. "The Colour Still Unwinds" – 4:36
2. "Scarlet Man" – 3:31
3. "In the Flesh" – 5:30
4. "Clarity" – 3:22
5. "Diced" – 4:23
6. "Chiaroscuro" – 7:31
7. "Black Widower" – 4:08
8. "Fools Paradise" – 4:56
9. "King of Misrule" – 5:19
10. "Gods Thoughts" – 5:52
