= Shine (Shaman's Harvest album) =

Studio album by Shaman's Harvest
- Released: May 1, 2009
- Genre: Hard rock, post-grunge, alternative rock, southern rock
- Length: 26:51
- Label: Tribal Records

Shaman's Harvest chronology
| March of the Bastards (2006) | Shine (2009) | Smokin' Hearts & Broken Guns (2014) |

Singles from Shine
- 1. "Dragonfly" Released: June 29, 2009; 2. "Shine" Released: August 24, 2010

Shine is the fourth studio album by hard rock band Shaman's Harvest. It was released on May 1, 2009. The first single, "Dragonfly", reached number 34 on Billboard's Rock Songs chart. It also peaked at number 15 on the Billboard Mainstream Rock Tracks. The second single was "Shine".

== Track listing ==
| No. | Title | Length |
|---|---|---|
| 1. | "Dragonfly" | 2:59 |
| 2. | "Turn It Up" | 3:46 |
| 3. | "Last Goodbye" | 3:56 |
| 4. | "Wait in the Light" | 3:04 |
| 5. | "Shine" | 2:26 |
| 6. | "Devil's Gift" | 3:54 |
| 7. | "Strike the Slate" | 3:38 |
| 8. | "Say the Same" | 3:08 |
| Total length: | | 26:51 |
