= Classic Rock Roll of Honour Awards =

Rock music awards

The Classic Rock Roll of Honour was an annual awards program that ran from 2005 to 2016. The awards were founded by Classic Rock magazine. Winners of the awards were chosen by the awards team and voted on by readers of the magazine. Winners are announced at an annual awards show and featured in the magazine.

== Winners & recipients ==
=== 2005 ===
Held at the Cafe De Paris, London
Hosted by Andy Copping
Live acoustic performance by Motörhead

- Best New Band: The Answer
- Comeback of the Year: Billy Idol
- The Showman: Arthur Brown
- Classic Songwriter: Ian Hunter
- The Metal Guru: Judas Priest
- Classic Album: In Rock by Deep Purple
- The Inspiration Award: Tommy Vance
- The V.I.P.: Neil Warnock
- The Living Legend: Lemmy Kilmister

=== 2006 ===
Held at The Langham Hotel, London
Hosted by Andy Copping

- Best New Band: Roadstar
- Album of The Year: A Matter of Life and Death by Iron Maiden
- Band of the Year: Whitesnake
- Best Reissue: A Night at the Opera by Queen
- DVD of the Year: Live... In the Still of the Night by Whitesnake
- Event of the Year: Return of Monsters of Rock
- Classic Songwriter: Queen
- Comeback of the Year: New York Dolls
- VIP Award: Rod Smallwood
- Tommy Vance Inspiration: Phil Lynott
- Classic Album: Hysteria by Def Leppard
- Metal Guru: Ronnie James Dio
- Living Legend: Alice Cooper

=== 2007 ===
Held at The Landmark Hotel, London
Hosted by Nicky Horne

- Best New Band: Black Stone Cherry
- Best Reissue: Kiss Alive! 1975–2000 by Kiss
- DVD of The Year: Apostrophe (') / Over-Nite Sensation by Frank Zappa
- Album of the Year: Fear of a Blank Planet by Porcupine Tree
- Band of the Year: Rush
- Event of the Year: Aerosmith
- Classic Songwriters: Status Quo
- Metal Guru: Tony Iommi
- Showman Award: Jeff Wayne
- The Classic Rock / Childline Award: Ian & Jackie Paice
- Tommy Vance Inspiration Award: Mick Ronson
- Outstanding Contribution: Storm Thorgerson
- Classic Album: Bat Out of Hell by Meat Loaf
- Comeback of the Year: Heaven & Hell
- Living Legend: Jimmy Page

=== 2008 ===
Held at the Sheraton Park Lane Ballroom, London
Hosted by Nicky Horne

- Best New Band: Airbourne
- Best Reissue: Reissues of Kill 'Em All, Ride the Lightning and Master of Puppets by Metallica
- DVD of The Year: Plug Me In by AC/DC
- Band of the Year: Foo Fighters
- Album of the Year: Good to Be Bad by Whitesnake
- The Songwriter: Peter Green
- Showman Award: Paul Stanley
- VIP Award: Harvey Goldsmith
- Event of the Year: Led Zeppelin at the O2 Arena
- Metal Guru: MC5
- Classic Album: Disraeli Gears by Cream
- Gibson presents the Tommy Vance Inspiration Award: Syd Barrett
- Marshall 11" Award: Slash
- The Classic Rock / Childline Award: Bryan Adams
- Outstanding Contribution: Jeff Beck
- Living Legend: Ozzy Osbourne

=== 2009 ===
Held at the Sheraton Park Lane Ballroom, London
Hosted by Danny Bowes

- Best New Band: Chickenfoot
- Album of the Year: Black Ice by AC/DC
- Band of the Year: Iron Maiden
- Best Reissue: Deluxe editions of Black Sabbath, Paranoid and Master of Reality by Black Sabbath
- DVD/Film of the Year: Anvil! The Story of Anvil by Anvil
- Event of the Year: Download Festival
- Outstanding Contribution: Ronnie Wood
- Tommy Vance Inspiration Award: John Bonham
- Innovator: Ginger Baker
- VIP Award: Doc McGhee
- Metal Guru: Biff Byford
- Spirit of Prog: Dream Theater
- Marshall 11" Award : Billy Gibbons
- Childline Rocks Award: Steve Harley
- Classic Songwriter: Paul Rodgers
- Classic Album: Rocks by Aerosmith
- Breakthrough: Joe Bonamassa
- Comeback of the Year: Mott the Hoople
- Living Legend: Iggy Pop

=== 2010 ===
Held at Camden Roundhouse, London
Hosted by Alice Cooper
Live performance by Cheap Trick and Alter Bridge ft. Slash

- Best New Band: The Union
- Album of the Year: Slash by Slash
- Band of the Year: AC/DC
- Event of the Year: "Don't Stop Believin'" by Journey hits No.6 on the UK Singles chart
- Reissue of the Year: Exile on Main St by The Rolling Stones
- DVD/Film of the Year: Oil City Confidential by Julien Temple
- Breakthrough: Imelda May
- Spirit of Prog: Rick Wakeman
- Childline Rocks Award: Glenn Hughes
- Marshall 11" Award: Michael Schenker
- Innovator: Killing Joke
- Classic Songwriter: Roy Wood
- Outstanding Contribution: John Paul Jones
- Metal Guru: Geezer Butler
- Classic Album: Cheap Trick at Budokan by Cheap Trick
- VIP Award: John Jackson
- Tommy Vance Inspiration: Ronnie James Dio
- Living Legend: Rush

=== 2011 ===
Held at Camden Roundhouse, London
Hosted by Gene Simmons
Live performances by Jeff Beck with special guests, Chrissie Hynde and Joss Stone

- Best New Band: Vintage Trouble
- Album of the Year: Sensory Overdrive by Michael Monroe
- Band of the Year: Foo Fighters
- Event of the Year: The Wall Live by Roger Waters
- Reissue of the Year: Reissues package of 5 albums by Queen
- DVD/Film Award: Lemmy for Lemmy Kilmister
- Breakthrough: Black Country Communion
- Spirit of Prog: Jethro Tull
- Innovator: Deep Purple
- Classic Songwriter: Manic Street Preachers
- Outstanding Contribution: Bob Ezrin
- Metal Guru: Scorpions
- Classic Album: Quadrophenia by The Who
- VIP Award: Baron Wolman
- Tommy Vance Inspiration: Steve Marriott
- Musicians' Union Maestro Award: Steve Winwood
- Living Legend: Jeff Beck

=== 2012 ===
Held at Camden Roundhouse, London
Hosted by Duff McKagan
Live performances by Lynyrd Skynyrd, Saint Jude and Walking Papers

- Best New Band: Tracer
- Album of the Year: Clockwork Angels by Rush
- Band of the Year: Rush
- Event of the Year: Ginger Raises £ 250k
- Reissue of the Year: Immersion by Pink Floyd
- DVD/Film Award: The Story of Wish You Were Here by Pink Floyd
- Breakthrough: Rival Sons
- Spirit of Prog: Family
- Classic Songwriter: Russ Ballard
- Outstanding Contribution: The Damned
- Metal Guru: Anthrax
- Classic Album: Live! by Status Quo
- VIP Award: Tony Smith
- Tommy Vance Inspiration: Jon Lord
- Musicians' Union Maestro Award: Phil Manzanera
- Showman of The Year: Nikki Sixx
- Comeback Award: Lynyrd Skynyrd
- Living Legend: ZZ Top

=== 2013 ===
Held at Camden Roundhouse, London
Hosted by Fish
Live performances by The Darkness, Zakk Wylde and The Temperance Movement

- Best New Band: The Temperance Movement
- Album of the Year: 13 by Black Sabbath
- Band of the Year: The Rolling Stones
- Event of the Year: 13 by Black Sabbath hits No.1 on various charts
- Reissue of the Year: Rumours by Fleetwood Mac
- DVD/Film Award: Celebration Day by Led Zeppelin
- Breakthrough: The Virginmarys
- Spirit of Prog: Alex Lifeson
- Innovator: Wilko Johnson
- Classic Songwriter: Ray Davies
- Outstanding Contribution: Mott the Hoople
- Metal Guru: Zakk Wylde
- Classic Album: Blues Breakers with Eric Clapton by John Mayall
- VIP Award: Shep Gordon
- Tommy Vance Inspiration: Rory Gallagher
- Musicians' Union Maestro Award: James Dean Bradfield
- Showman of The Year: The Darkness
- Living Legend: Black Sabbath

=== 2014 ===
Held at Avalon Hollywood, Los Angeles
Hosted by Sammy Hagar
Live performances by Kings of Chaos, Scott Weiland & The Wildabouts, Rival Sons and California Breed

- Best New Band: The Cadillac Three
- Album of the Year: Going Back Home by Wilko Johnson and Roger Daltrey
- Band of the Year: Queen + Adam Lambert
- Reissue of the Year: Reissues of I, II & III by Led Zeppelin
- DVD/Film Award: Through the Never by Metallica
- Outstanding Contribution: Jeff Lynne
- Metal Guru: Dave Mustaine
- Classic Album: Blizzard of Ozz by Ozzy Osbourne
- VIP Award: Sharon Osbourne
- Tommy Vance Inspiration: The Doors
- Musicians' Union Maestro Award: Joe Perry
- The Bluesman: Eric Burdon
- Living Legend: Gregg Allman

=== 2015 ===
Held at Camden Roundhouse, London
Hosted by Chris Jericho
Live performances by Europe, Blackberry Smoke and Yoshiki

- Best New Band: We Are Harlot
- Album of the Year: Book of Souls by Iron Maiden
- Band of the Year: AC/DC
- Reissue of the Year: Led Zeppelin
- DVD/Film Award: Sonic Highways by Foo Fighters
- Comeback: Europe
- Showman of The Year: Noddy Holder
- Outstanding Contribution: Nils Lofgren
- Classic Album: Welcome to my Nightmare by Alice Cooper
- VIP Award: Rod McSween
- Tommy Vance Inspiration: Jimi Hendrix
- Living Legend: Queen

=== 2016 ===
Held at Ryōgoku Kokugikan, Tokyo
Hosted by Dave Mustaine
Live performances by Jeff Beck, Joe Perry, Rudolf Schenker, Johnny Depp, Phil Collen, Richie Sambora and Orianthi, Tesla, Cheap Trick.

- Best New Band: The Struts
- Album of the Year: Def Leppard by Def Leppard
- Band of the Year: Jeff Lynne's ELO
- Reissue of the Year: Queen: The Studio Collection by Queen
- Eastern Breakthrough Male Band: One Ok Rock
- Japan Next Generation prize: Band-Maid
- Asian Icon Award: Yoshiki
- Best Asian Performer: Sarah Geronimo
- Icon Award: Jeff Beck
