= Domiy =

Ukrainian singer (born 2000)

- Марія Віталіївна Довгаюк
- Born: 3 November 2000 (age 25); Verben, Rivne Oblast, Ukraine
- Education: R. Glier Kyiv Institute of Music, Kyiv Municipal Academy of Variety and Circus Arts
- Occupations: Singer, musician, author and performer of her own songs
- Awards: YUNA

Mariia Dovhaiuk (Ukrainian: Марія Віталіївна Довгаюк; born 3 November 2000), professionally known as Domiy is a Ukrainian singer, musician, author and performer of her own songs.

== Biography ==
Mariia Dovhaiuk was born on 3 November 2000 in Verben, Rivne Oblast.

She studied at the R. Glier Kyiv Institute of Music and the Kyiv Municipal Academy of Variety and Circus Arts (with honors).

She made her debut in 2020 with a cover of the song "Obiimy" by Okean Elzy on TikTok. Later she started writing her own songs.

As of May 2025, her video for the song "Nahadai" was viewed by over 50 million users. For a long time, it was ranked #1 in the top 100 music videos on YouTube; #5 in the top 100 on Apple Music in Ukraine; #2 in the top 10 on Lux FM.

In 2024, she wrote the lyrics and music for the song "Shcho ty narobyla" for Tina Karol. During the full-scale Russian invasion, she is raising funds for the needs of Ukrainian defenders.

== Videoclips ==
- "Chy ne tak?" / «Чи не так?» (2025)
- "Tak i ne znaishla" / «Так і не знайшла» (2025)
- "Zvyknuty" / «Звикнути» (2025)
- "Ne proide" / «Не пройде» (2024, with SHUMEI)
- "Pro osin" / «Про осінь» (2024, with SAMCHUK)
- "Kriz doshchi" / «Крізь дощі» (2024)
- "Zabuvaiu" / «Забуваю» (2024, with 100lytsia)
- "Na porozi" / «На порозі» (2024)
- "Sadok vyshnevyi kolo khaty" / «Садок вишневий коло хати» (2024, with BARYK)
- "Ne bulo" / «Не було» (2024)
- "Teplo tak" / «Тепло так» (2024)
- "Nahadai" / «Нагадай» (2023)
- "Nash lystopad" / «Наш листопад» (2023)
- "Okean" / «Океан» (2023, with Roman Skorpion)
- "Nezalezhna dusha" / «Незалежна душа» (2023)
- "Liubov i lito" / «Любов і літо» (2023)
- "Rany zatsvitaiut" / «Рани зацвітають» (2023)
- "Lebedi materynstva" / «Лебеді материнства» (2023)
- "Nalyi meni vyna" / «Налий мені вина» (2023)

== Awards ==
Year	Subject	Category	Awards	Result	Ref
2024	for the song "Ne proide" (with SHUMEI)	Opening of the year	Gold Disc	Won	
2025		Opening of the year	YUNA	Won	
