= A Dream in Static =

Studio album by Earthside
- Released: October 23, 2015
- Genre: Progressive metal; cinematic music; post-metal
- Length: 63:52
- Label: Self released
- Producer: David Castillo, Frank Sacramone, and Jamie van Dyck

Earthside chronology
A Dream in Static (2015)	Let the Truth Speak (2024)

A Dream in Static is the debut studio album by American post-metal band Earthside. The album was released on October 23, 2015, and produced by David Castillo, in addition to two of the band members Frank Sacramone and Jamie van Dyck.

== Critical reception ==
Professional ratings
Review scores
Source	Rating
The Prog Mind	9.5/10
Blabbermouth	10/10

Blabbermouth gave the album a 10/10, praising Earthside for their ability to span musical genres and permit each song to have its own sense of identity while preserving a distinctly progressive metal sound. Tony Shrum of New Noise Magazine praised the album, though they commented that the tracks with guest vocalists largely outshined the fully instrumental tracks. "The cross-continental project highlights the best of prog from around the world and features vocalists capable of carrying this grandiose music. If not for a relatively underwhelming instrumental portion of the record, Earthside could have released one of the best debuts in a long, long time."

== Track listing ==
All tracks are written by Earthside.

A Dream in Static track listing
No.	Title	Length
1.	"The Closest I've Come"	8:00
2.	"Mob Mentality" (featuring Lajon Witherspoon and the Moscow Studio Symphony Orchestra)	9:56
3.	"A Dream in Static" (featuring Daniel Tompkins)	7:35
4.	"Entering the Light" (featuring Max ZT and the Moscow Studio Symphony Orchestra)	5:27
5.	"Skyline"	9:28
6.	"Crater" (featuring Bjorn Strid)	6:03
7.	"The Ungrounding"	5:34
8.	"Contemplation of the Beautiful" (featuring Eric Zirlinger)	11:49
Total length:		63:52

== Personnel ==
Credits adapted from the album's Bandcamp page.

Earthside

- Ben Shanbrom – drums, percussion, backing vocals
- Frank Sacramone – Grand piano, keyboards, programming
- Ryan Griffin – bass
- Jamie van Dyck – electric and acoustic guitars, orchestration, backing vocals

Additional vocalists

- Lajon Witherspoon – guest vocals on track 2
- Daniel Tompkins – guest vocals on track 3
- Bjorn Strid – guest vocals on track 6
- Eric Zirlinger – guest vocals on track 8

Additional instrumentalists

- The Moscow Studio Symphony Orchestra – instrumentalists on tracks 2 and 4
- Max ZT – hammer dulcimer on track 4
- Henrik Gennert – guitar solo on track 7
- JP Asplund – percussion

Additional personnel

- Produced by David Castillo at Ghost Ward (Stockholm, Sweden)
- Co-produced by Earthside members Frank Sacramone and Jamie van Dyck
- Tracks 1, 6, and 7 mixed by Jens Bogren with Johan Örnborg at Fascination Street Studios
- Tracks 2, 3, 4, 5, and 8 mixed by David Castillo at Ghost Ward
- Mastered by Jens Bogren at Fascination Street Studios

Imagery

- Travis Smith - cover artist
