= The Cold Stares =

American rock band

- Origin: Evansville, Indiana, United States
- Genres: heavy rock; blues; blues rock
- Years active: 2010–present
- Labels: Mascot Records; Mascot Label Group
- Members: Chris Tapp; Brian Mullins; Bryce Klueh
- Website: https://www.thecoldstares.com/

The Cold Stares are an American rock band from Evansville, Indiana, formed in 2009. The duo (now recently a trio) has independently released four studio albums - A Cold Wet Night (2014), Head Bent (2017), Mountain (2018), and Ways (2019) - with their fifth release Heavy Shoes released via Mascot Records on August 13, 2021.

== History ==
The duo, originally from Madisonville in Western Kentucky, is guitarist-singer Chris Tapp and drummer Brian Mullins, who have a friendship that dates to their early twenties when they were in bands together. They went their separate ways then to only circle back a decade later and currently reside in Evansville. The group then self-released their first four albums.

The band's 2012 release A Cold Wet Night and a Howling Wind sold 25,000 copies and reached #1 on Amazon Music's Blues Rock albums chart.

The title track from Head Bent (2017) was used in a Dodge commercial, and 2018's Mountain album featured "Sleeping With Lions" which was used in Animal Kingdom on TNT, a Monster Energy commercial, ESPN, and the X Games.

Their 2019 album Ways again made Amazon's Best Sellers list in the Hard Rock category. While the band was scheduled to support Joe Bonamassa on his 2020 Keeping the Blues Alive at Sea II cruise, the event was canceled as a result of the COVID-19 pandemic.

Their song "Mojo Hand" is the trailer song for Cyberpunk 2077, with over 10 million streams on YouTube and features actor Keanu Reeves. Another Cold Stares track, "Suffer Me," is also featured in the game.

In 2021, Mascot North America President Ron Burman announced that the group had signed to Mascot Label Group, and announced their fifth studio album Heavy Shoes. Mixed by Mark Needham and mastered by Andy Vandette, the project was released on August 13, 2021. The album artwork was designed by Rick and Morty's Corey Booth. The singles "In the Night Time" and "Prosecution Blues" were chosen by Classic Rock Magazine and their readers as tracks of the week. American Songwriter praised the record, calling it "gusty and personal" and "arguably their finest [record]."

Since 2022, the duo has become a trio, adding bassist Bryce Klueh to the original lineup. In 2023, the trio launched their latest studio album, "Voices", also under the Mascot label group.

== Discography ==
Albums

- A Cold Wet Night (2014)
- Head Bent (2017)
- Mountain (2018)
- Ways (2019)
- Heavy Shoes (2021)
- Voices (2023)
- The Southern (2024)
- The Southern, Pt. 2 (2025)
- Texas (2026)

EPs

- Resonator (2015)
- Look Over Yonder Hill (2015)
- Ways Blue (2019)
- Ways White (2019)
- Ways Black (2019)
- Black Sunset (2020)
