= Synergy (Shaman's Harvest album) =

Studio album by Shaman's Harvest
- Released: April 28, 2002
- Genre: Hard rock, post-grunge, alternative rock
- Length: 62:24
- Label: Tribal Records

Shaman's Harvest chronology
Last Call for Goose Creek (1999)	Synergy (2002)	March of the Bastards (2006)

Synergy is the second studio album by hard rock band Shaman's Harvest. It was released on April 28, 2002.

== Track listing ==
No.	Title	Length
1.	"Cardinal Syn"	4:41
2.	"Comet Riders"	4:07
3.	"Open Hand"	3:54
4.	"The Walk"	4:12
5.	"Gasoline"	5:36
6.	"7-6"	4:03
7.	"Here and Now"	4:29
8.	"Blue"	3:39
9.	"Clutch"	3:12
10.	"Bermuda"	4:31
11.	"JD Love"	5:19
12.	"Synergy"	16:41
