= March of the Bastards =

Studio album by Shaman's Harvest
- Released: August 8, 2006
- Genre: Hard rock, post-grunge, alternative rock
- Length: 42:41
- Label: Tribal Records

Shaman's Harvest chronology
Synergy (2002)	March of the Bastards (2006)	Shine (2009)

Singles from March of the Bastards
- 1. "March of the Bastards"; 2. "The Offering"

March of the Bastards is the third studio album by hard rock band Shaman's Harvest. It was released on August 8, 2006.

== Track listing ==
1. "Home (Part I)" – 2:03
2. "The Lorax" – 3:10
3. "March of the Bastards" – 4:18
4. "The Offering" – 4:49
5. "Drawn by the Sirens" – 3:48
6. "Waiting for the Animal" – 4:39
7. "Sequoia" – 4:10
8. "Halon" – 3:54
9. "The Anvil" – 4:00
10. "Home (Part III)" – 4:16
11. "Destination Nowhere" – 3:14
