= Smokin' Hearts & Broken Guns =

Studio album by Shaman's Harvest
- Released: September 16, 2014
- Genre: Hard rock, post-grunge, alternative rock, southern rock
- Length: 48:35
- Label: Mascot Label Group

Shaman's Harvest chronology
Shine (2009)	Smokin' Hearts & Broken Guns (2014)	Red Hands Black Deeds (2017)

Smokin' Hearts & Broken Guns is the fifth studio album by American hard rock band Shaman's Harvest, released on September 16, 2014, through Mascot Label Group.

== Track listing ==
No.	Title	Length
1.	"Dangerous"	4:02
2.	"Here It Comes"	3:42
3.	"Ten Million Voices"	3:56
4.	"Blood in the Water"	4:26
5.	"The End of Me"	3:12
6.	"Country as Fuck"	2:54
7.	"Hero"	3:56
8.	"Dirty Diana" (Michael Jackson cover)	4:00
9.	"In the End"	4:14
10.	"In Chains"	4:07
11.	"Silent Voice"	5:35
12.	"Dragonfly (Extended Unplugged Version)"	4:31
13.	"Country as Fuck (Unplugged)"	3:00
14.	"Here It Comes (Unplugged)"	3:25
Total length:		54:55
