= Last Call for Goose Creek =

Studio album by Shaman's Harvest
- Released: October 11, 1999
- Genre: Hard rock, post-grunge, alternative rock
- Length: 56:08
- Label: Tribal Records

Shaman's Harvest chronology
Last Call for Goose Creek (1999)	Synergy (2002)

Last Call for Goose Creek is the first studio album by hard rock band Shaman's Harvest. It was released in 1999.

== Track listing ==
No.	Title	Length
1.	"Conductor Man"	3:13
2.	"Window Pain"	4:34
3.	"Stalker's Letter"	4:03
4.	"Seat 21"	3:44
5.	"Preacher Man"	3:30
6.	"Durin's Bane"	3:38
7.	"Naonna"	5:39
8.	"Pride Is Gone"	6:29
9.	"7 Years from Then"	4:21
10.	"Blood in the Streets"	4:30
11.	"The Whale Song"	4:44
12.	"Stone in My Pocket"	7:44
