= Shaman's Harvest =

American rock band

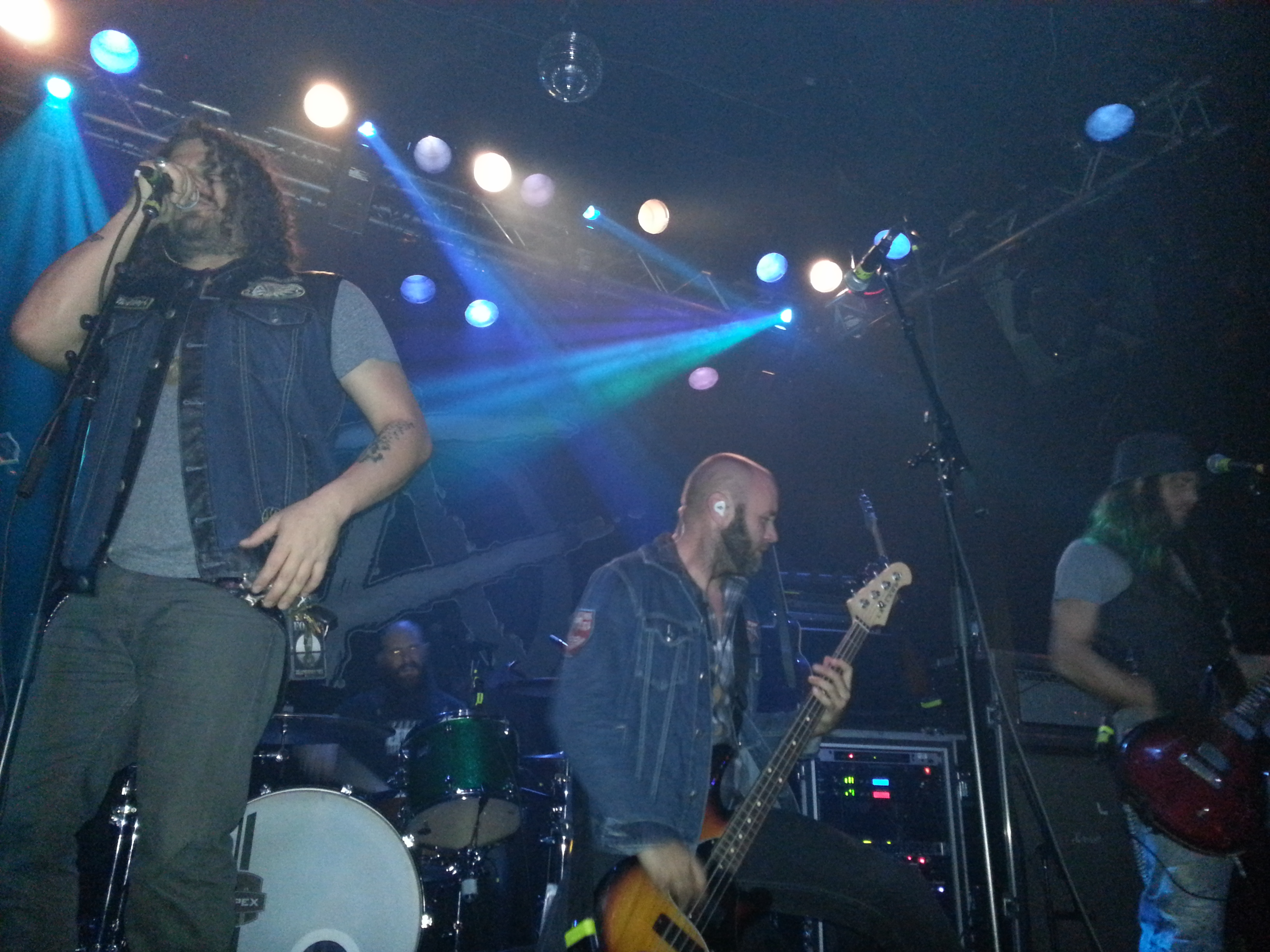
- Shaman's Harvest in 2014

Background information
- Origin: Jefferson City, Missouri, U.S.
- Genres: Hard rock; post-grunge; alternative rock; alternative metal
- Years active: 1996–present
- Labels: Mascot; Tribal
- Members: Nathan Hunt; Josh Hamler; Cord Bishop; Adam Zemanek; Derrick Shipp
- Website: shamansharvest.com

Shaman's Harvest is an American rock band from Jefferson City, Missouri. Bassist Matt Fisher, singer Nathan "Drake" Hunt, and guitarist Josh Hamler formed the band in 1996. Ryan Tomlinson joined the band on lead guitar for their 2009 album Shine. Overall, Shaman's Harvest has released seven studio albums.

== History ==
The band released three albums in their early years: Last Call for Goose Creek (1999), Synergy (2002), and March of the Bastards (2006). In 2009, the single "Dragonfly" from their fourth album, Shine, reached number 16 on Billboard's Active Rock chart, nine at Heritage Rock, and 34 on Billboard's Rock Songs chart. The single sold over 130,000 copies and the album sold 33,000+ copies. The song appeared on the soundtrack of the motion picture Legendary.

In early 2010, Shaman's Harvest recorded "Broken Dreams" as the theme song for wrestler Drew McIntyre of the WWE. They continued that relationship, supplying "End of Days" as the entrance track for Wade Barrett and The Corre. They also created the promo song "And Then There Was Darkness" for Bray Wyatt and The Undertaker for their match at WrestleMania 31. Their song "Anger" appears in the feature film No One Lives.

During the recording of their album Smokin' Hearts & Broken Guns, Hunt was diagnosed with throat cancer and received treatment during the recording of the album. Lead guitarist Ryan Tomlinson left the group in September 2014 to concentrate on his band Driving Wheel. He was replaced by guitarist Derrick Shipp for the tour supporting Smokin' Hearts & Broken Guns. Joe Harrington joined on drums following the release of Smokin' Hearts & Broken Guns. He left in August 2015 and Jeff Nations (of JB Crockett; formerly of Rookie of the Year) filled in before Adam Zemanek joined on drums in October 2015. "In Chains", the final single off of Guns, reached #12 on Billboard's Mainstream Rock chart and spent 22 weeks there, their highest peaking single, in addition to spending four months in the Top 10 of iTunes' Metal Songs chart.

In 2017, the band released their sixth studio album, Red Hands Black Deeds. Written during the 2016 presidential election, it represented a departure for the band in its thematical and lyrical content, discussing the political and economic struggles in the United States. The album appeared on four Billboard charts, including #1 on the Heatseekers Albums chart, the band's first to do so. To support the album, they opened for Nickelback on their "Feed the Machine" North American tour along with Daughtry.

On May 14, 2021, Shaman's Harvest released the track "Bird Dog". This was followed by the radio single "Voices" and its music video on September 10. On October 22, the band announced their latest studio album, Rebelator, which released on March 11, 2022. The album announcement coincided with the release of a third album track, "Under Your Skin". To support the album, the band toured with Theory of a Deadman in early 2022.

In February 2026, the band was announced as part of the lineup for the Louder Than Life music festival in Louisville, scheduled to take place in September.

== Members ==
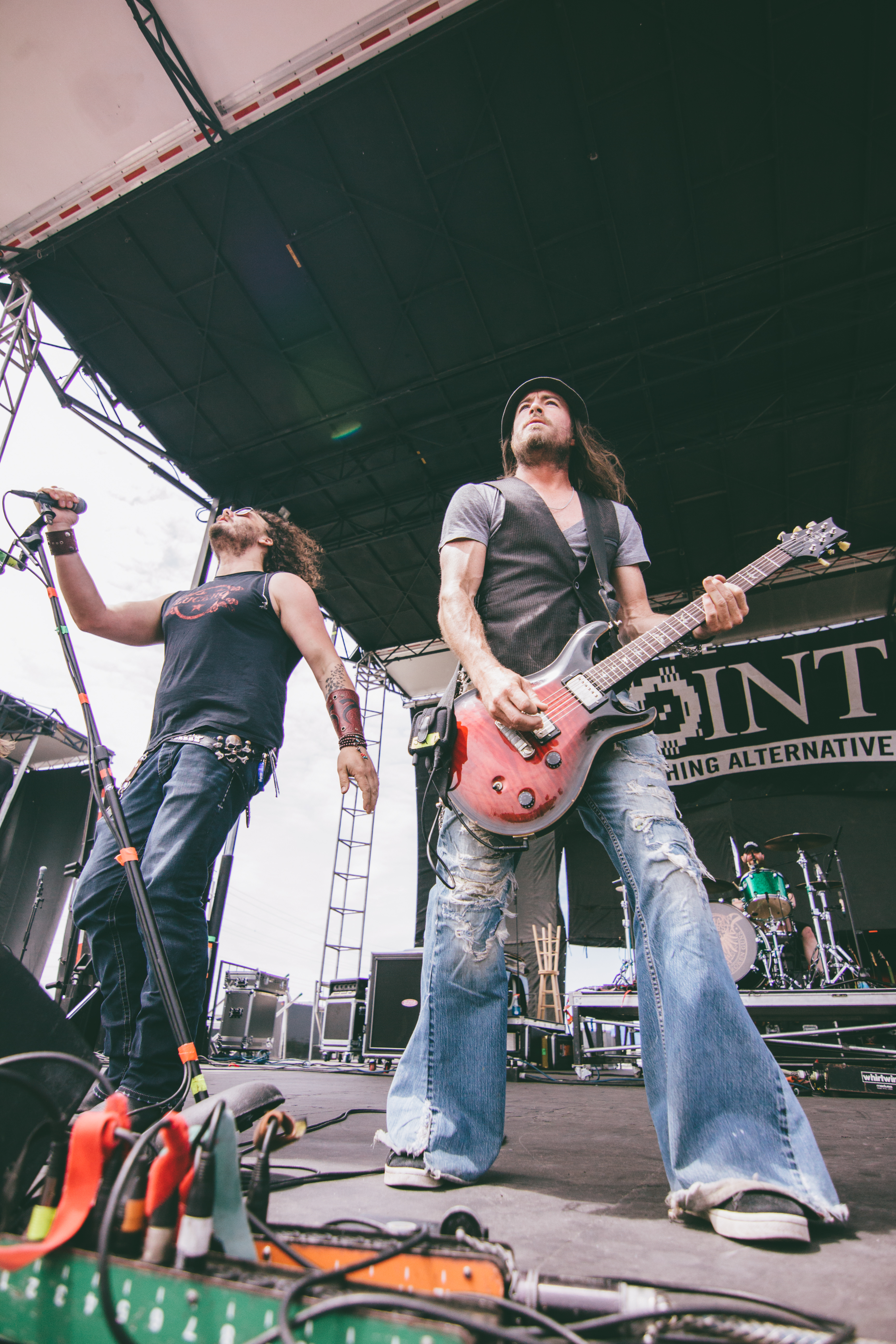
Shaman's Harvest in 2014

- Nathan Hunt – vocals
- Josh Hamler – rhythm guitar
- Derrick Shipp – lead guitar
- Adam Zemanek – drums
- Cord Bishop – bass

=== Former members ===
- Matt Fisher – bass
- Ryan Tomlinson – lead guitar
- Jay Pelzer – lead guitar
- Adam Hunt – lead guitar
- Ryan Turnbull – drums
- Craig Wingate – drums
- Lance Bennett – drums
- Spencer Huff – drums
- Joe Harrington – drums
- Jeff Nations – drums (sub)

== Discography ==
=== Studio albums ===
Title	Details	Peak chart positions			
Title	Details	US Heat.	US Indie.	US Rock	US Sale.
Last Call for Goose Creek	Released: October 11, 1999 (US); Label: Tribal Records	—	—	—	—
Synergy	Released: April 28, 2002 (US); Label: Tribal Records	—	—	—	—
March of the Bastards	Released: August 8, 2006 (US); Label: Tribal Records	—	—	—	—
Shine	Released: May 1, 2009 (US); Label: Tribal Records	41	—	—	—
Smokin' Hearts & Broken Guns	Released: September 16, 2014 (US); Label: Mascot	5	34	23	—
Red Hands Black Deeds	Released: July 28, 2017 (US); Label: Mascot	1	9	20	56
Rebelator	Released: March 11, 2022 (US); Label: Mascot	—	—	—	—
"—" denotes a recording that did not chart or was not released in that territory.

=== Singles ===
Title	Year	Peak positions		Album
Title	Year	U.S. Main.	U.S. Rock	Album
"March of the Bastards"	2006	—	—	March of the Bastards
"The Offering"	2006	—	—	March of the Bastards
"Dragonfly"	2009	18	34	Shine
"Shine"	2010	—	—	Shine
"Here It Comes"	2013	34	—	Smokin' Hearts & Broken Guns
"Dangerous"	2014	27	—	Smokin' Hearts & Broken Guns
"Dirty Diana"	2015	28	—	Smokin' Hearts & Broken Guns
"In Chains"	2015	12	—	Smokin' Hearts & Broken Guns
"The Come Up"	2017	25	—	Red Hands Black Deeds
"The Devil in Our Wake"	2018	24	—	Red Hands Black Deeds
"Bird Dog"	2021	—	—	Rebelator
"Voices"	2021	22	—	Rebelator
"Rock n Roll Queen"	2025	—	—	TBA

=== Music videos ===
Song	Year	Director(s)
"The Offering"	2007	
"Dragonfly"	2009	David Probst & Merrick Astroth
"Dangerous"	2014	Kyle Cogan
"In Chains"	2015	Kyle Cogan
"Here It Comes"	2016	Kyle Cogan & Marty Kane
"The Come Up"	2017	Kyle Cogan
"The Devil in Our Wake"	2018	Elijah Alvarado
"Voices"	2021	Juan Ibanez
"Under Your Skin"	2022	Juan Ibanez
