= Students' Guide to Colleges =

College guidebook series

- Author: Jordan Goldman, Colleen Buyers
- Language: English
- Subject: Education, Higher Education, Guidebooks
- Genre: Non-fiction
- Published: 2004, 2005, 2006, 2007, 2008 (Penguin Books)
- Publication place: United States
- Pages: 704 pp
- ISBN: 978-0143035589

Students' Guide to Colleges is a series of United States college guidebooks released by Penguin Books.

The first Students’ Guide to Colleges was featured in Time, Forbes, ABC News, U.S. News & World Report and more than 30 national radio programs. It became one of the top five best-selling college guidebooks and was turned into a series, released in five annually updated editions.

Students’ Guide was created by Jordan Goldman and Colleen Buyers when they were 18 years old. In 2000, the pair built a website and online survey asking college students to tell them the truth about what their colleges were really like. In an early example of a website going viral, hundreds of thousands of students visited and more than 30,000 current students weighed in with detailed responses.

Goldman and Buyers edited the results into a 704-page college guide profiling schools across America and including some explicit content. They were signed by the literary agency Janklow & Nesbit Associates and their manuscript was purchased by Penguin Books, the second largest publisher in the world.

Chuck Hughes, Senior Admissions Officer at Harvard, signed on to write the book’s preface, calling it the result of “a virtual grassroots movement … spurred on by the power of the Internet and the power of student networks ... friends told friends about Students’ Guide ... news spread from school to school.” Hughes described the finished product as “a new kind of guidebook … providing detailed, nuanced, personal and honest portraits of schools … the stories behind the statistics ... the next best thing to spending a week on campus.”

After its initial publication Goldman, Buyers and Penguin Books turned Students' Guide into a series, released in five annually updated editions. Goldman and Buyers launched new online surveys and edited tens of thousands of new student submissions for publication each year.

== Publications ==
- Goldman, Jordan (2004). Students' Guide to Colleges: 2004. New York: Penguin.
- Goldman, Jordan (2005). Students' Guide to Colleges: 2005. New York: Penguin.
- Goldman, Jordan (2006). Students' Guide to Colleges: 2006. New York: Penguin.
- Goldman, Jordan (2007). Students' Guide to Colleges: 2007. New York: Penguin.
- Goldman, Jordan (2008). Students' Guide to Colleges: 2008. New York: Penguin.
