= Vola (band) =

Danish progressive metal band

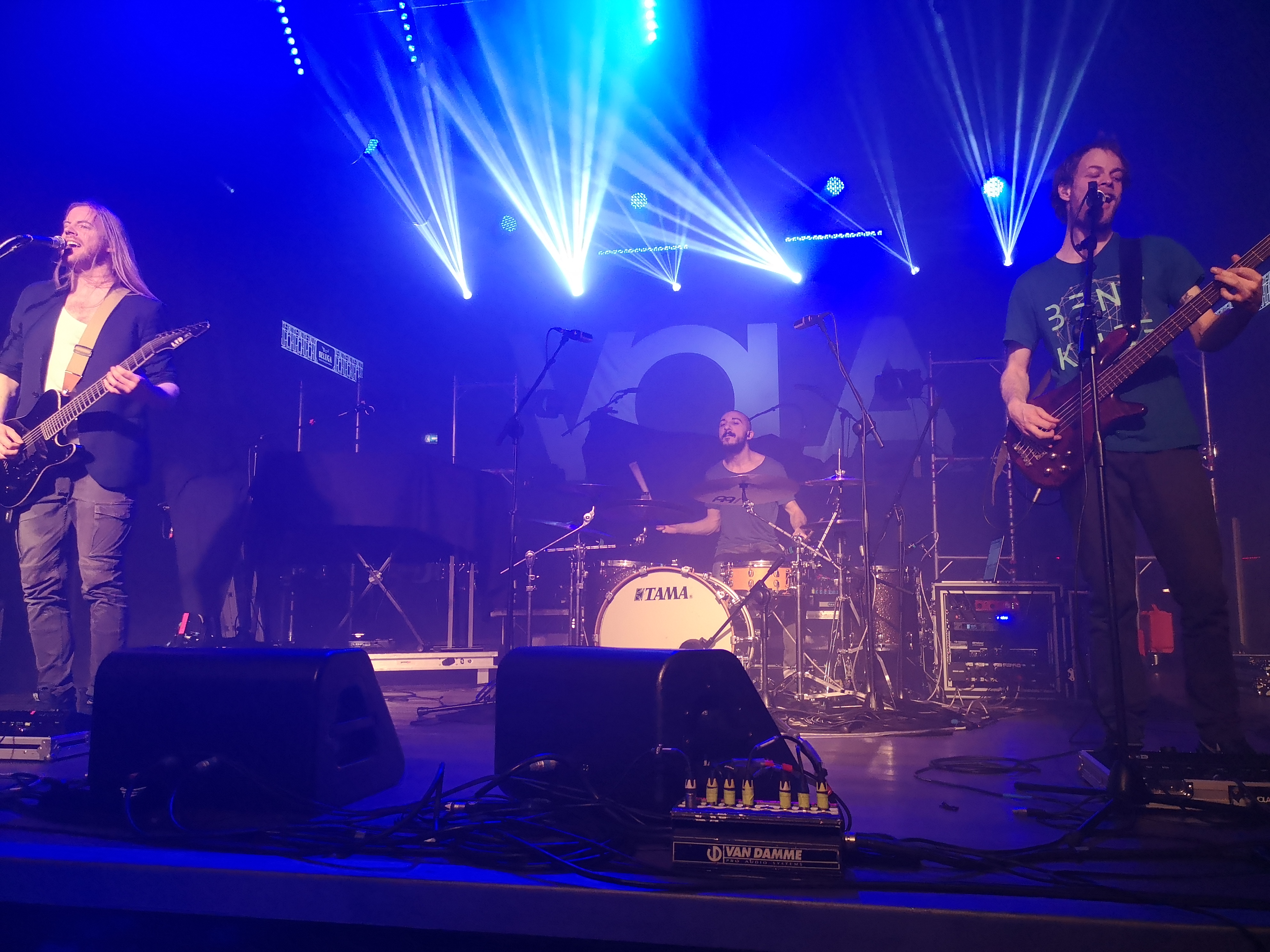
- VOLA in 2019

Background information
- Origin: Copenhagen, Denmark
- Genres: Progressive metal; djent; progressive rock; alternative rock
- Years active: 2006–present
- Label: Mascot
- Members: Asger Mygind; Martin Werner; Nicolai Mogensen; Adam Janzi
- Past members: Jeppe Bloch; Niklas Scherfig; Niels Dreijer; Felix Ewert
- Website: volaband.com

Vola (stylized as VOLA) are a Danish progressive metal band formed in Copenhagen in 2006. Having gone through a number of lineup changes earlier in their career, the band currently consists of three Danes, guitarist/vocalist Asger Mygind, keyboardist Martin Werner and bassist Nicolai Mogensen; and one Swede, drummer Adam Janzi.

== History ==
=== Origins (2006–2012) ===
The band was formed by vocalist and guitarist Asger Mygind and some friends, and coalesced into a stable lineup in 2006. The band self-released their first EP, Homesick Machinery, in 2008, which featured Mygind, guitarist Niels Dreijer, bassist Jeppe Bloch, Martin Werner on keyboards and Niklas Scherfig on drums. A single, "Glasswork", was also released on 22 March 2010.

After the first EP, there were some lineup changes, with Bloch and Scherfig replaced by Nicolai Mogensen and Felix Ewert, respectively. The new lineup recorded a second EP, Monsters, which was self-released by the band in 2011. This EP consists of four tracks characterised by a mix of progressive rock and djent styles. The band went on a short five-date tour of their home country to promote the EP, after which Dreijer left the band, leaving them as a four-piece, with Mygind taking over sole responsibility for vocals and guitars, and Mogensen handling backing vocals when they played live.

=== Inmazes (2015–2017) ===
On 2 February 2015, VOLA self-released their first album Inmazes. A video was released for the first single, "Gutter Moon" in August 2016. The album was later given a physical release on 16 September 2016 by Mascot Label Group. According to Mygind the lyrical themes on Inmazes relate to entrapment:

The album tries to capture this feeling of being trapped in mental mazes and not being able to fully experience happiness, basically. How is this struggle visualized in your own mind and how do your surroundings react to the behaviour caused by it.

On 2 June 2017, the band released their October Session EP, featuring new acoustic versions of two songs from Inmazes ("Gutter Moon" and "Stray the Skies"), with a video being produced for the latter.

To promote Inmazes, the band embarked on a European tour for the first time, supporting Katatonia on their Fallen Hearts Over Europe tour, alongside the Icelandic band Agent Fresco. Drummer Ewert was busy with other commitments and was therefore unable to take part in the tour, so the band hired Simen Sandnes from the band Arkentype as a temporary replacement. It was subsequently announced on 22 August 2017 that Ewert had amicably left the band on a permanent basis, to focus on other projects. His replacement was revealed to be the Swedish drummer Adam Janzi, who had previously played with The Drake Equation.

=== Applause of a Distant Crowd (2018–2019) ===
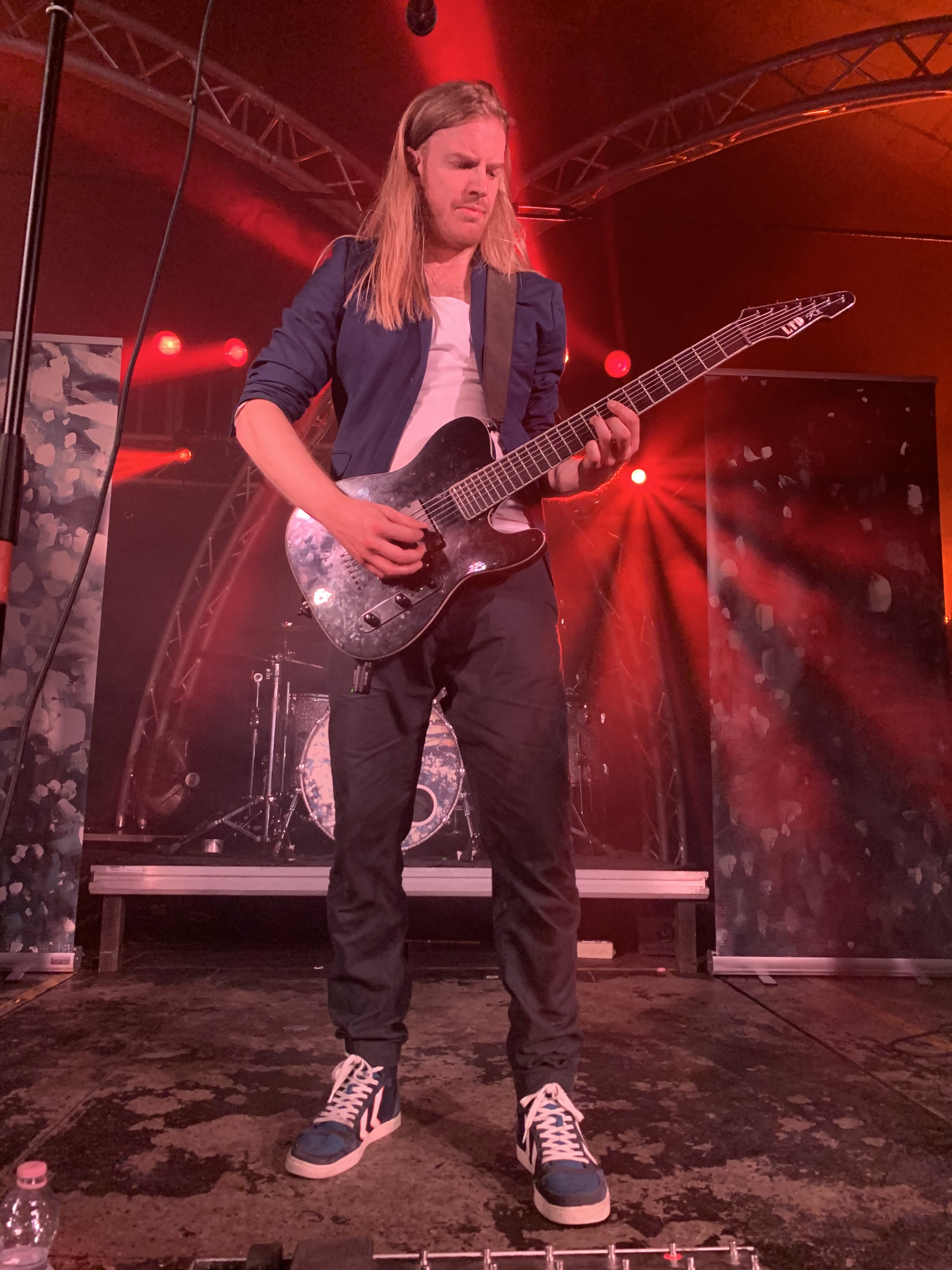
Frontman Asger Mygind live in Parma in 2019

VOLA's second album, Applause of a Distant Crowd, was released on 12 October 2018, and was considered something of a departure from Inmazes, with less emphasis on the heaviness of the first album, and greater use of electronics, a process defined as "natural" by Asger Mygind:

I was in a very different place mentally while writing the lyrics for Inmazes. I'm definitely in a happier place now.

It was actually a relief to be able to have a wider range of awareness for this record. I think our songs develop in the most natural way if I let my emotional response to the music dictate what the lyrics should be about rather than following any kind of plan. This time the emotions were mostly tied to observations I've made about the outside world.

In anticipation of the album's release, VOLA released videos between August and October 2018 for "Smartfriend", "Ghosts" and "Alien Shivers". The band were special guests on Monuments' European tour during October and November 2018.

On 11 January 2019, the band released a lyric video for "Whaler" and were announced as the support act for Haken on their European tour throughout February and March. At the end of May 2019 a video was released for "Ruby Pool", the fourth track on the album.

During September 2019, VOLA embarked on their first headlining tour, supported by Arch Echo and Rendezvous Point.

=== Witness (2020–2022) ===
During the second half of 2019, Mygind discussed the band's plans to begin recording their third album in early 2020. It was expected to be heavier than Applause of a Distant Crowd.

On 21 August 2020, the band announced that they had finished recording their third album, which was in the process of being mixed.

A video for the first single, "Head Mounted Sideways", was premiered on 19 November 2020, with the new album due to be released in 2021. A second video, for "Straight Lines", was released in February 2021, at which point it was announced that the new album was to be called Witness, and released on 21 May 2021. On 11 March 2021, a video for the song "24 Light-Years", created by Mogensen and Anne Nørkjær Bang, was premiered. A fourth single, "These Black Claws", featuring SHAHMEN, was released on 6 May 2021.

To promote Witness, the band performed a live-streamed concert from the swimming pool of the abandoned Auderød military camp in North Zealand, near Copenhagen, Denmark, on 11 September 2021. This performance served as the band's first live release, Live From The Pool, which was released on 1 April 2022.

=== Friend of a Phantom (2023–present) ===
On 22 August 2023, the band released the video for their single, "Paper Wolf". This was followed in June 2024 by a further video for "Break My Lying Tongue", the second single from their fourth studio album, Friend of a Phantom, which was announced for release on 1 November 2024. A third single of the upcoming album, "I Don't Know How We Got Here", was released on 7 August with an official visualizer with lyrics. The album's 4th single, "Cannibal", featuring Anders Fridén of In Flames, was released on 19 September, along with a music video.

On 22 December 2025, the band posted a GoFundMe campaign about a fire that occurred in a storage facility in Nettolager, Copenhagen. According to the band, their complex where their unit was located 'completely burned down'. All of the equipment including: merchandise, instruments, recording equipment, computers, etc had been destroyed in the fire. They have raised 90% of the cost to cover everything damaged in the fire.

== Musical style and influences ==
On their first album Inmazes, VOLA combined the typical sounds of progressive metal and electronic music, creating songs with odd time signatures, complex riffs and melodic choruses, with the cover banner drawing comparisons to Pink Floyd, Rammstein and Meshuggah. As explained by Mygind, even the name of the band (which was chosen by previous bassist Jeppe Bloch) reflects their sound in that they "try to do [their] choruses very majestic and grandiose [sic]".

With the release of their second album Applause of a Distant Crowd, the band expanded their musical palette to incorporate a more progressive rock sound and a greater use of electronics, with progressive metal essentially limited to the songs "Smartfriend" and "Whaler".

Amongst their influences the band have named Opeth, Porcupine Tree, Devin Townsend, Soilwork, Meshuggah, Massive Attack, Ulver, and Mew. Mygind is a big fan of British musician and producer Steven Wilson, choosing his top ten favourite songs for Prog magazine in November 2018.

== Band members ==
Current

- Asger Mygind – guitars, lead vocals (2006–present)
- Martin Werner – keyboards (2006–present)
- Nicolai Mogensen – bass, backing vocals (2009–present), synth (2021–present)
- Adam Janzi – drums (2017–present)

Past

- Jeppe Bloch – bass (2006–2009)
- Niklas Scherfig – drums (2006–2011)
- Niels Dreijer – guitars, backing vocals (2006–2012)
- Felix Ewert – drums (2011–2017)

Touring

- Simen Sandnes – drums (2016)

== Discography ==
=== Studio albums ===
- Inmazes (2015)
- Applause of a Distant Crowd (2018)
- Witness (2021)
- Friend of a Phantom (2024)

=== Live albums ===
- Live from the Pool (2022)

=== EPs ===
- Homesick Machinery (2008)
- Monsters (2011)
- October Session (2017)
- Audiotree from Nothing (2024)

=== Singles ===
- "Glasswork" (2010)
- "Head Mounted Sideways" (2020)
- "Straight Lines" (2021)
- "24 Light-Years" (2021)
- "These Black Claws" (feat. Shahmen) (2021)
- "Napalm (Re-Witnessed)" (2022)
- "Paper Wolf" (2023)
- "Break My Lying Tongue" (2024)
- "I Don't Know How We Got Here" (2024)
- "Cannibal" (feat. Anders Friden) (2024)
- "Bleed Out" (2024)

== Videography ==
Year	Song	Director(s)
2015	"Gutter Moon"	Nicolai Mogensen and Anne Nørkjær Bang
2015	"Emily"	Nicolai Mogensen and Anne Nørkjær Bang
2016	"Stray the Skies"	Nicolai Mogensen and Anne Nørkjær Bang
2018	"Smartfriend"	Craig Murray
2018	"Ghosts"	Dennis Andersson and David Andersson
2018	"Alien Shivers"	Nicolai Mogensen and Anne Nørkjær Bang
2019	"Whaler"	Brownstache Productions
2019	"Ruby Pool"	Asger Mygind
2020	"Head Mounted Sideways"	Tuomas Kurikka and Patrik Nuorteva
2021	"Straight Lines"	Tuomas Kurikka and Patrik Nuorteva
2021	"24 Light-Years"	Nicolai Mogensen and Anne Nørkjær Bang
2021	"These Black Claws"	Tuomas Kurikka and Patrik Nuorteva
2023	"Paper Wolf"	Tuomas Kurikka and Patrik Nuorteva
2024	"Break My Lying Tongue"	Tuomas Kurikka and Patrik Nuorteva
2024	"Cannibal"	Tuomas Kurikka and Patrik Nuorteva
2024	"Bleed Out"	Tuomas Kurikka and Patrik Nuorteva
