= Dragged Under =

American punk rock band

- Origin: Seattle, Washington, U.S.
- Genres: Melodic hardcore; metalcore; punk rock
- Years active: 2019–present
- Label: Mascot
- Members: Anthony Cappocchi; Sean Rosario; Ryan "Fluff" Bruce; Hans Hessburg; Dylan Roy
- Past members: Kalun Wertz; Zesty Sams; Josh Wildhorn; Kalen Anderson
- Website: draggedunder.com

Dragged Under (stylized as DRAGGED UИDEʁ) is an American punk rock band from Seattle, Washington, formed in 2019. Their debut album The World Is in Your Way broke the Top 10 on the US Alternative iTunes charts, as well as number 18 on the Billboard top alternative new artists and number 45 top current hard music charts.

== History ==
The band was formed in 2019 by vocalist Anthony Cappocchi and guitarists Ryan "Fluff" Bruce and Josh Wildhorn, following the breakup of their previous band Rest, Repose which also has YouTube guitarist Jared Dines.

Dragged Under's first album The World Is in Your Way, which was released on January 17, 2020, featuring several songs that had originally been written by Rest, Repose, but were scrapped when that band broke up. While the album was initially released independently, the deluxe version was released through Mascot Records on November 15, 2020. Garnering 4.5 million streams in six months, it has since gone on to garner over 10 million streams on Spotify. To support the project, the band went on tour as a supporting act for The Used in the winter of 2020.

In May 2021, it was confirmed that the band would join Beartooth and Wage War on their fall 2021 tour. Shortly thereafter, they announced that their first live EP, We'll Do It Live, would be released on August 6, 2021, alongside the live version of the single "Hypochondria".

On August 12, 2021, the band released a new single, "Brainwash Broadcast", featuring Spencer Chamberlain of Underoath. On March 18, 2022, they announced the release of their second album Upright Animals for June 10, and released a music video for the album's second single, entitled "All of Us".

== Musical style and influences ==
Critics have categorized Dragged Under's music as melodic hardcore, punk rock and metalcore. The band describe their own sound as "3 parts punk rock, 1 part metal/hardcore", citing influences such as Sum 41, Rise Against, the Offspring, Beartooth, Every Time I Die, Cave In, Jimmy Eat World, All American Rejects, New Found Glory and Comeback Kid.

== Members ==
Current

- Anthony Cappocchi – lead vocals (2019–present)
- Sean Rosario – rhythm guitar, backing vocals (2020–present)
- Ryan "Fluff" Bruce – lead guitar, backing vocals (2019–2023, 2025–present)
- Hans Hessburg – bass guitar, backing vocals (2019–2023, 2025–present)
- Dylan Roy – drums (2026–present, touring 2023–2026)

Touring

- Chris Namoc – guitar, backing vocals (2023–2024)

Former

- Kalun Wertz – drums (2019)
- Zesty Sams – bass guitar, backing vocals (2019)
- Josh Wildhorn – rhythm guitar, backing vocals (2019–2020)
- Kalen Anderson – drums (2019–2023)

== Discography ==
Dragged Under discography
- Studio albums: 2
- Live albums: 1
- Singles: 11
- Music videos: 9

=== Studio albums ===
Title	Details
The World Is in Your Way	Released: January 17, 2020; Label: Mascot; Format: CD, digital download, streaming
Upright Animals	Released: June 10, 2022; Label: Mascot; Format: CD, digital download, streaming

=== Live albums ===
Title	Details
We'll Do It Live	Released: August 6, 2021; Label: Mascot; Format: Digital download, streaming

=== Singles ===
Title	Year	Album
"This Holiday"	2020	The World Is in Your Way (Deluxe Edition)
"Hypochondria – Live"	2021	We'll Do It Live
"Hypochondria	2021	The World Is in Your Way
"Chelsea – Live"	2021	We'll Do It Live
"Chelsea"	2021	The World Is in Your Way
"Instability – Live"	2021	We'll Do It Live
"Instability"	2021	The World Is in Your Way
"Brainwash Broadcast" (featuring Spencer Chamberlain)	2021	Upright Animals
"All of Us"	2022	Upright Animals
"Crooked Halos"	2022	Upright Animals
"Suffer"	2022	Upright Animals

=== Music videos ===
Year	Title	Director	Album
2019	"Hypochondria"	Austin Hodaie / Blacksnow Films	The World Is in Your Way
2019	"Instability"	Josh Gillespie	The World Is in Your Way
2020	"Chelsea"	Justin Ichikawak	The World Is in Your Way
2020	"Just Like Me"	Kevin Garcia	The World Is in Your Way (Deluxe Edition)
2020	"Feel It"	Kevin Garcia	The World Is in Your Way (Deluxe Edition)
2021	"Brainwash Broadcast" (featuring Spencer Chamberlain)	Monte Legaspi	Upright Animals
2022	"All of Us"	Monte Legaspi	Upright Animals
2022	"Crooked Halos"	Brian Cox	Upright Animals
2022	"Never Enough"	Justin Ichikawa	Upright Animals
