= Earthside =

American progressive metal band

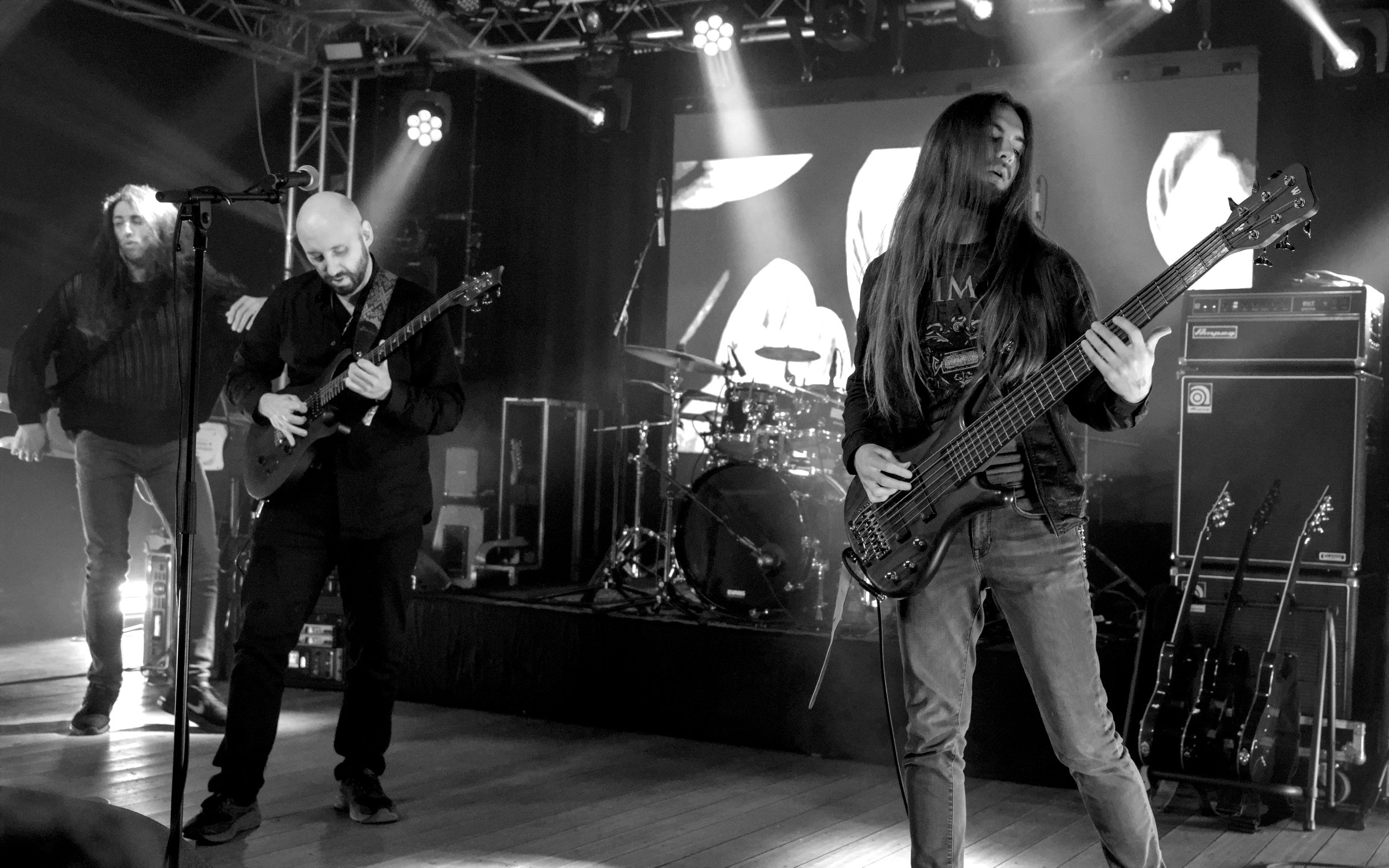
- The band live at ProgPower Europe 2023. From left to right: Frank Sacramone, Jamie van Dyck and Ryan Griffin; Ben Shanbrom is behind Griffin.

Background information
- Also known as: Bushwhack
- Origin: New Haven, Connecticut, United States
- Genres: Progressive metal, cinematic music, post-metal
- Years active: 2015–present
- Label: Music Theories Recordings / Mascot Label Group
- Members: Jamie van Dyck; Ryan Griffin; Frank Sacramone; Ben Shanbrom
- Website: www.earthsideband.com

Earthside is an American progressive metal band from New Haven, Connecticut, consisting of guitarist Jamie van Dyck, bassist Ryan Griffin, keyboardist Frank Sacramone and drummer Ben Shanbrom. The band has no full-time vocalist; instead they have guests in their albums and perform live with prerecorded vocal tracks and image projections of the singers.

== History ==
=== Formation and early years ===
The first incarnation of the band was called Bushwhack and was formed by van Dyck, Sacramone and Shanbrom when they were in high school. That project was set aside as the members felt it did not truly represent them, unlike the current band Earthside, whose name "has a subtlety and an elegance that we feel fits our aesthetic and our aspirations to make beautiful, emotional music that has real weight and honesty to it", according to van Dyck. Griffin joined them during the transition and after failing to find a vocalist, they decided to work with different singers for each non-instrumental song.

=== A Dream in Static (2015–2016) ===
The band released their debut A Dream in Static in 2015, featuring Daniel Tompkins (Tesseract), Björn Strid (Soilwork) and the Moscow Studio Symphony Orchestra. It was produced by David Castillo and mixed/mastered by Jens Bogren, with the cover art by Travis Smith. The album was promoted by the single "Mob Mentality", which was originally part of guitarist Jamie van Dyck's thesis at Yale University and featured Lajon Witherspoon of Sevendust. In 2024, Loudwire elected it as one of the 11 best progressive metal debut albums of all time.

In 2016, they supported Leprous (with Voyager) for the European leg of their The Congregation tour.

=== Let the Truth Speak (2022–present) ===
In November 2022, they released a new song titled "We Who Lament", featuring Canadian singer Keturah and being part of their then upcoming second album; the song was supported by a video. Nearly one year later, a new video for the song was released, this time featuring Keturah in it as well.

In August and September 2023, they released more singles from their second album Let the Truth Speak: respectively, the title track (featuring Tompkins and Gennady Tkachenko-Papizh), coinciding with the album announcement, and "Pattern of Rebirth" (featuring AJ Channer ((Fire from the Gods)). In the same month, van Dyck announced on social media that he had been diagnosed with testicular cancer.

On November 17, 2023, they released Let the Truth Speak via Music Theories Recordings / Mascot Label Group, featuring many guests, including members from Tesseract and Leprous and Larry Braggs (ex-Tower of Power, ex-The Temptations). Also in November, they were announced as the supporting band for the North American tour of Australian progressive metal band Caligula's Horse promoting their album Charcoal Grace.

In February 2024, they performed live with a vocalist for the first time ever when Channer joined them onstage. Later that year, they performed at ProgPower USA and then toured with Soen and Leprous.

The band embarked on their first headlining tour in February 2025, supported by SOM. They also released a new single, "frozen heart ~ burning world" on February 19th.

== Members ==
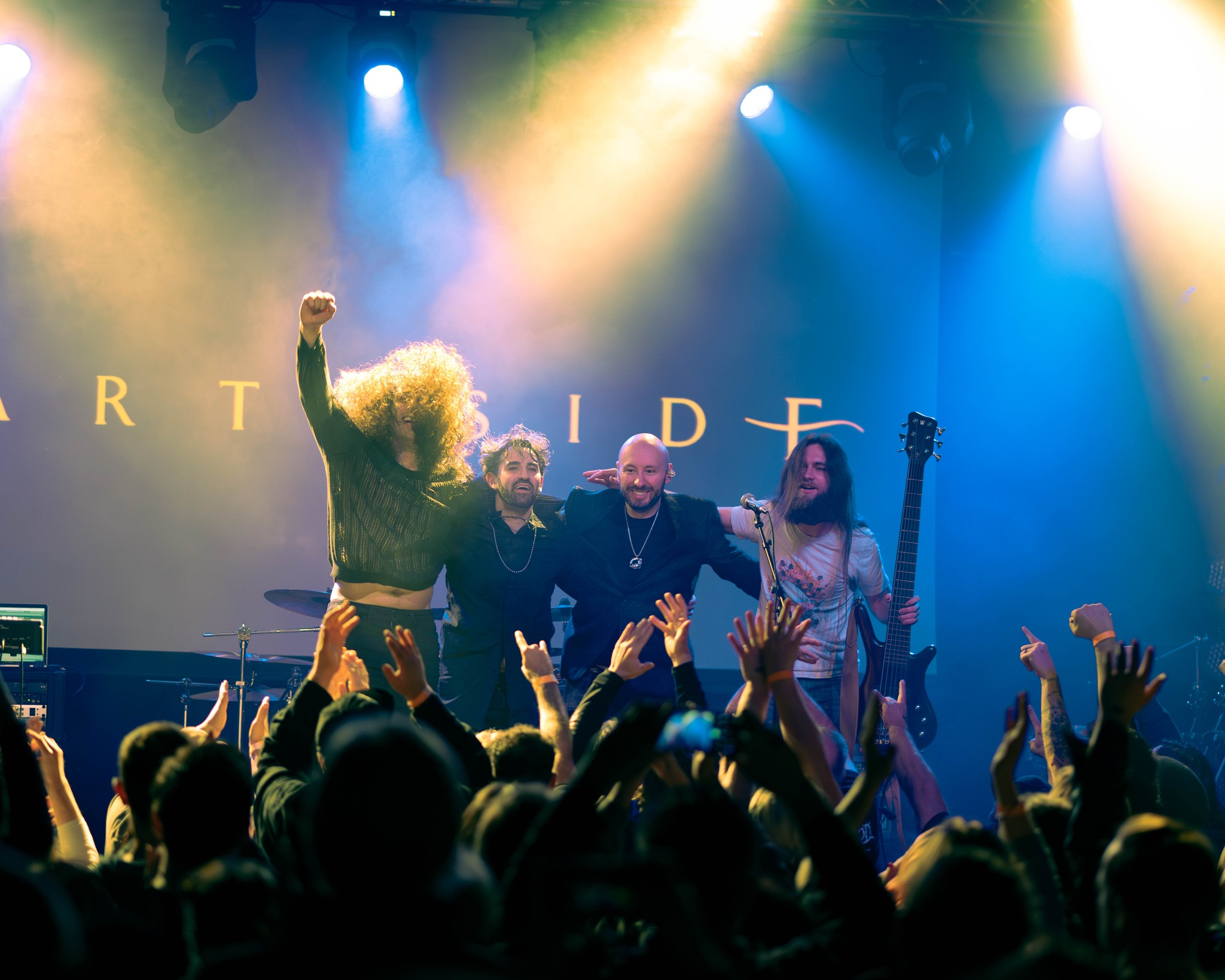

- Jamie van Dyck - guitars, backing vocals, programming, keyboards
- Ryan Griffin - bass, backing vocals
- Frank Sacramone - keyboards, synthesizers, programming, percussion, guitar
- Ben Shanbrom - drums, backing vocals

== Discography ==
=== Studio albums ===
- A Dream in Static (2015)
- Let The Truth Speak (2023)

=== Singles ===
- "Mob Mentality" (2015)
- "We Who Lament" (2022)
- "Let the Truth Speak" (2023)
- "Pattern of Rebirth" (2023)
- "frozen heart ~ burning world" (2025)
- "A Dying Star" (2026)
