= Kyiv Municipal Academy of Variety and Circus Arts =

School for performing arts in Ukraine

Coordinates: 50°26′20″N 30°29′59″E

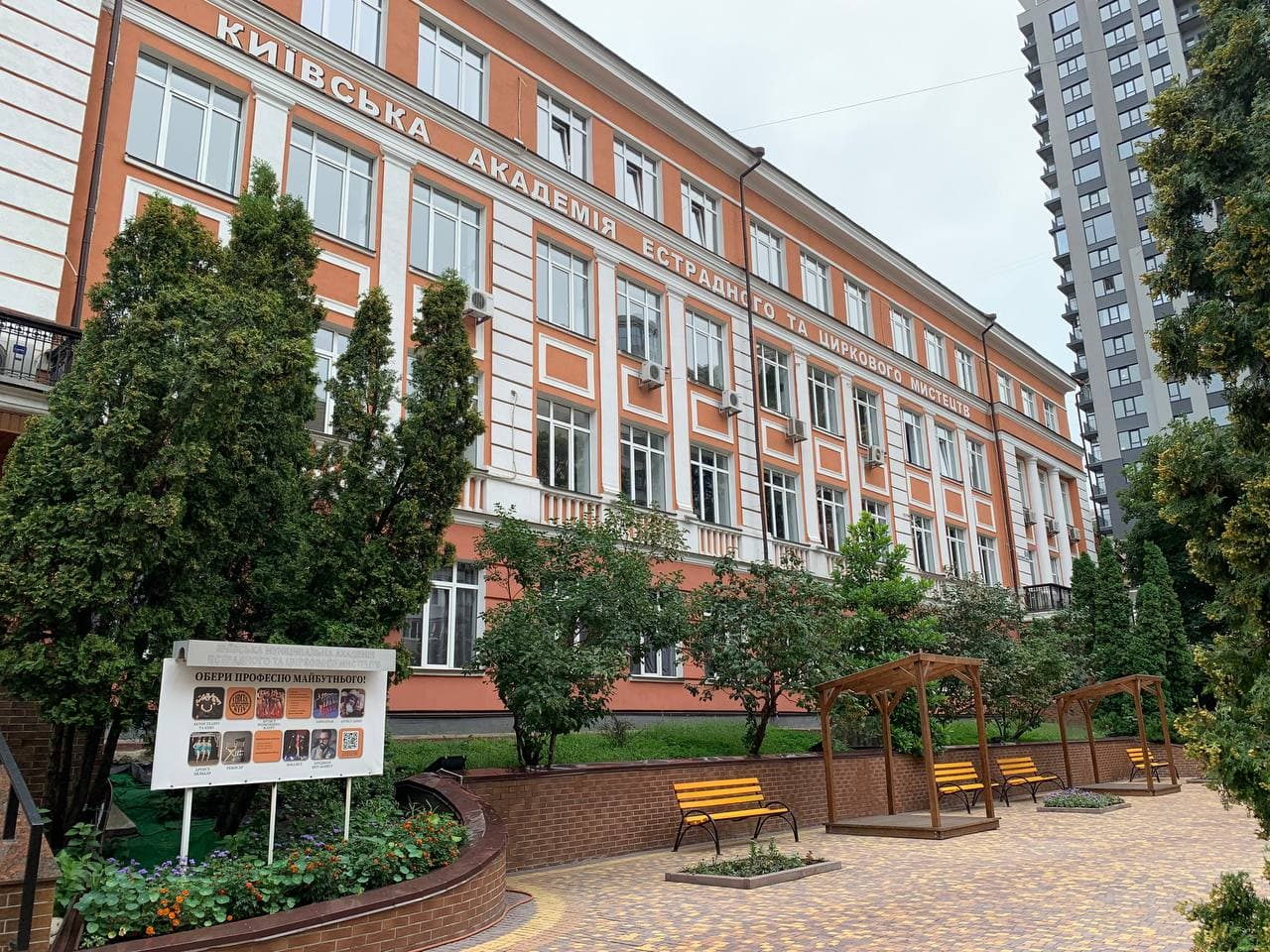

The Kyiv Municipal Academy of Variety and Circus Arts (Ukrainian: Київська муніципальна академія естрадного та циркового мистецтва, romanized: Kyivska munitsypalna akademiia estradnoho ta tsyrkovoho mystetstva) is a Ukrainian institution of higher education, training stage and circus performers.

Founded as a Republic-wide studio in 1961 in the Ukrainian SSR, it became a state school and later the Kyiv State College of Circus and Variety Arts. In 2008 it gained the status of a Municipal Academy.

The academy has three faculty divisions comprising 190 instructors: the Circus Art Faculty, the Musical Art Faculty, and the Theatrical Art Faculty.

== Notable alumni ==
- Andriy Danylko, comedian and singer, Honored Artist of Ukraine, known for the character Verka Serduchka
