= Mascot Label Group =

Dutch music label

- Founded: 1989
- Distributor: FUGA
- Genre: Rock, Metal, Blues, Funk, Prog & Guitar
- Country of origin: Netherlands
- Official website: mascotlabelgroup.com

Mascot Label Group is an independently owned record label founded in 1989 in The Netherlands under the name Mascot Records. The company was renamed Mascot-Provogue in 1999 and since 2010 has been known as the Mascot Label Group. The company is based in the Netherlands and has offices in New York, Cologne, Stockholm, Milan, Paris and London. It was distributed by ADA and Warner Music Group until 2022; it is now digitally distributed by FUGA internationally and physically distributed by AMPED in the United States. Mascot Label Group is the parent company of the following labels: Mascot Records, Provogue Records, Music Theories Recordings, Cool Green Recordings, The Funk Garage, and The Players Club.

Mascot Label Group distributes Favored Nations internationally and partially distributes Surfdog Records outside North America.

Mascot Label Group is a label member of the American Association of Independent Music (A2IM) and STOMP.

== Labels ==
- Mascot Records – a rock-focused label whose roster includes 10 Years, Black Stone Cherry, Conquer Divide, Dragged Under, P.O.D., Shaman's Harvest, & VOLA, as well as newer acts such as Any Given Sin, The Georgia Thunderbolts, The Cold Stares, Oxymorrons, Calva Louise and Defects. Mascot gained attention for fostering the career of Volbeat, who have sold over 100,000 records in Europe. In June 2012, Mascot had its first number one rock album chart entry in the UK with Black Country Communion's self-titled album. Black Label Society's 2014 record "Catacombs Of The Black Vatican" charted in over 10 European countries. In 2016, "Kentucky", the first Black Stone Cherry release on Mascot Records charted in 10 European countries and the United States.
- Provogue Records – a blues / rock label featuring Joe Bonamassa, Cedric Burnside, Beth Hart, Gov’t Mule, Kenny Wayne Shepherd, Warren Haynes, Walter Trout, Robin Trower, Eric Gales, Steve Cropper, Robert Cray, Kris Barras Band, Quinn Sullivan, King Solomon Hicks and more. Provogue Records found success growing the career of Joe Bonamassa who went from playing for 50 people in London in 2007 to selling out the Royal Albert Hall in 2009. Bonamassa has sold over 1,500,000 albums in Europe.
- Music Theories Recordings – is a progressive rock whose roster includes Ayreon, Arjen Lucassen, Memories of Machines, Flying Colors, Yngwie Malmsteen, Earthside and more. Music Theories is co-run with Michael Schmitz, one of the founders of prog label Inside Out.
- Cool Green Recordings – an alternative/indie label. Among the artists released on Cool Green Recordings are Australian desert rockers Tracer, Dutch alternative band De Staat, Crippled Black Phoenix, Masters Of Reality of Chris Goss (co-writer/producer Kyuss/Queens of the Stone Age) and more. De Staat's album "O" entered the Dutch national charts at #3 and won best alternative band three times in a row at the 3FM Awards.
- The Funk Garage – a funk label for which Bootsy Collins plays a leading role in finding and shepherding projects. The roster currently includes Maceo Parker, Dumpstaphunk, and Candy Dulfer.
- The Players Club – a guitar-centric record label whose roster includes Toto and members Steve Lukather, David Paich and Joseph Williams, as well as Robby Krieger, Marty Friedman, Paul Gilbert, Lee Ritenour and Matteo Mancuso.
- Favored Nations – a record label founded in 1999 by guitarist Steve Vai and Ray Scherr. Partnered with Mascot Label Group in 2017.

== Notable honors and awards ==
GRAMMY AWARDS (US/GLOBAL)

- 2022, Eric Gales, 'Crown' – Best Contemporary Blues Album (nominated)
- 2021, Steve Cropper, 'Fire It Up' – Best Contemporary Blues Album (nominated)
- 2021, Joe Bonamassa, 'Royal Tea' – Best Contemporary Blues Album (nominated)
- 2019, Robert Randolph & The Family Band, ‘Brighter Days’ – Best Contemporary Blues Album (nominated)
- 2017, Sonny Landreth, ‘Live in Lafayette’ – Best Contemporary Blues Album (nominated)
- 2016, Joe Bonamassa, 'Live at the Greek Theatre' – Best Traditional Blues Album (nominated)
- 2013, Beth Hart & Joe Bonamassa, ‘Seesaw’ – Best Blues Album (nominated)

CHART SUCCESSES (US/GLOBAL)

- 2024, Black Stone Cherry - "When The Pain Comes"
  - Peaked at #18 on Mediabase Active Rock Radio Chart in the U.S.
- 2024, P.O.D. - "Afraid To Die"
  - Peaked at #27 on Mediabase Active Rock Radio Chart in the U.S.
- 2024, Oxymorrons - "Look Alive"
  - Peaked at #28 on Mediabase Active Rock Radio Chart in the U.S.
- 2024, Any Given Sin - "Dynamite"
  - Peaked at #22 on Mediabase Active Rock Radio Chart in the U.S.
- 2023, Vandenberg - SIN
  - Peaked at #3 in the Netherlands on GFK Entertainment Charts for 1 week
- 2023, DeWolff - Love, Death & Inbetween
  - Peaked at #1 in the Netherlands on GFK Entertainment Charts for 3 weeks
- 2023, Black Stone Cherry - "Nervous"
  - Peaked at #21 on Mediabase Active Rock Radio Chart in the U.S.
- 2022, Beth Hart - A Tribute To Led Zeppelin
  - Billboard #2 Current Hard Rock Album
  - Billboard #7 Current Rock Album
  - Peaked at #1 in the Netherlands on GFK Entertainment Charts for 3 weeks
  - Peaked at #2 in Austria on GFK Entertainment Charts for 4 weeks
- 2021, DeWolff - Wolffpack
  - Peaked at #2 in the Netherlands on GFK Entertainment Charts for 4 weeks
- 2021, Any Given Sin - "The Way I Say Goodbye"
  - Peaked at #21 on Mediabase Active Rock Radio Chart in the U.S.
- 2021, TOTO - With A Little Help From My Friends
  - Peaked at #3 in the Netherlands on GFK Entertainment Charts for 1 week
  - Peaked at #6 in Germany on GFK Entertainment Charts for 3 weeks
- 2020, Ayreon - Electric Castle Live & Other Tales
  - Peaked at #1 in the Netherlands on GFK Entertainment Charts for 2 weeks
- 2020, Ayreon - Transitus
  - Peaked at #1 in the Netherlands on GFK Entertainment Charts for 2 weeks
- 2020, 10 Years - "The Shift"
  - Peaked at #25 on Mediabase Active Rock Radio Chart in the U.S.
- 2020, 10 Years - "The Unknown"
  - Peaked at #20 on Mediabase Active Rock Radio Chart in the U.S.
- 2020, Black Stone Cherry - "Again"
  - Peaked at #17 on Mediabase Active Rock Radio Chart in the U.S.
- 2020, Vandenberg - 2020
  - Peaked at #2 in the Netherlands on GFK Entertainment Charts for 2 weeks
- 2018, Beth Hart & Joe Bonamassa - Black Coffee
  - Peaked at #1 in the Netherlands on GFK Entertainment Charts for 6 weeks
  - Peaked at #3 in Switzerland on GFK Entertainment Charts for 9 weeks
- 2018, 10 Years - "Burnout"
  - Peaked at #21 on Mediabase Active Rock Radio Chart in the U.S.
- 2018, 10 Years - "Novacaine"
  - Peaked at #5 on Mediabase Active Rock Radio Chart in the U.S.
- 2018, P.O.D. - "Listening For The Silence"
  - Peaked at #18 on Mediabase Active Rock Radio Chart in the U.S.
- 2017, Ayreon - The Source
  - Peaked at #1 in the Netherlands on GFK Entertainment Charts for 4 weeks

BLUES MUSIC AWARDS (US/GLOBAL)

- 2022, Eric Bibb, ‘Dear America’ – Acoustic Blues Album (WON)
- 2022, Eric Gales, Instrumentalist – Guitar (WON)
- 2021, Walter Trout, “All Out of Tears” – Song of the Year (WON)
- 2021, Walter Trout, ‘Ordinary Madness’ – Blues Rock Album of the Year (nominated)
- 2021, King Solomon Hicks, ‘Harlem’ – Best Emerging Artist Album (WON)
- 2020, Eric Gales – Blues Rock Artist of the Year (WON)
- 2019, Beth Hart – B.B King Entertainer of the Year (nominated)
- 2019, Beth Hart – Contemporary Blues Female Artist (nominated)
- 2019, Beth Hart – Instrumentalist – Vocals (nominated)
- 2019, Kenny Wayne Shepherd, Blues Rock Artist (nominated)
- 2019, Eric Gales, Blue Rock Artist (nominated)
- 2018, Beth Hart – Instrumentalist – Vocals (WON)
- 2018, Beth Hart, ‘Fire on the Floor – Contemporary Blues Album of the Year (nominated)
- 2018, Beth Hart – Contemporary Blues Female Artist (nominated)
- 2018, Ronnie Baker Brooks – Contemporary Blues Male Artist (nominated)
- 2018, Walter Trout, ‘We’re All In This Together’ – Blues Rock Album of the Year (WON)
- 2017, Joe Bonamassa – B.B King Entertainer of the Year (WON)
- 2017, Joe Bonamassa – Instrumentalist – Guitar (WON)
- 2017, Walter Trout, ‘Alive in Amsterdam’ – Rock Blues Album (nominated)
- 2016, Sonny Landreth – Instrumentalist – Guitar (WON)
- 2016, Sonny Landreth, ‘Bound by the Blues’ – Contemporary Blues Album (nominated)
- 2016, Beth Hart – Contemporary Blues Female Artist (nominated)
- 2016, Walter Trout, "Gonna Live Again" – Song of the Year (WON)
- 2016, Walter Trout, ‘Battle Scars’ – Rock Blues Album of the Year (WON)
- 2015, Joe Bonamassa – Instrumentalist – Guitar (WON)
- 2015, The Robert Cray Band, ‘In My Soul’ – Soul Blues Album (nominated)
- 2015, Beth Hart – Contemporary Blues Female Artist (nominated)
- 2015, Joe Bonamassa – Contemporary Blues Male Artist (nominated)
- 2015, Walter Trout, ‘The Blues Came Callin’’ – Rock Blues Album of the Year (nominated)
- 2014, Beth Hart – Contemporary Blues Female Artist (nominated)
- 2014, Walter Trout, ‘Luther’s Blues’ – Rock Blues Album (nominated)
- 2013, Robert Cray – Contemporary Blues Male Artist (nominated)
- 2013, Joe Bonamassa – Gibson Guitar Award (nominated)
- 2013, Walter Trout, ‘Blues For the Modern Daze’ – Rock Blues Album (nominated)
- 2012, Beth Hart & Joe Bonamassa, ‘Don’t Explain’ – Contemporary Blues Album (nominated)
- 2011, Walter Trout, ‘Common Ground’’ – Rock Blues Album (nominated)

BLUES BLAST MUSIC AWARDS (US)

- 2022, Beth Hart – Vocalist (WON)
- 2022, Beth Hart – Female Blues Artist (WON)
- 2022, Beth Hart, 'A Tribute To Led Zeppelin' – Rock Blues Album (nominated)
- 2022, Eric Gales, 'Crown' – Rock Blues Album (WON)
- 2022, Eric Gales – Male Blues Artist (nominated)
- 2022, Eric Gales – Electric Guitar (nominated)
- 2022, Eric Bibb, 'Dear America' – Acoustic Blues Album (nominated)
- 2022, Eric Bibb – Acoustic Guitar (nominated)
- 2022, Sonny Landreth – Slide Guitar (nominated)
- 2021, Kenny Wayne Shepherd, 'Straight To You: Live' – Live Blues Album (WON)
- 2021, Walter Trout, 'Ordinary Madness' – Rock Blues Album (WON)
- 2021, George Benson, 'Live In London' – Live Blues Album (nominated)
- 2021, Gary Moore, 'How Blues Can You Get' – Rock Blues Album (nominated)
- 2020, Beth Hart – Female Blues Artist (WON)
- 2020, King Solomon Hicks – Sean Costello Rising Star Award (nominated)
- 2019, Walter Trout, ‘Survivor Blues’ – Rock Blues Album (nominated)
- 2019, Beth Hart, ‘Live At Royal Albert Hall’ – Live Blues Recording (nominated)
- 2018, Beth Hart – Female Blues Artist (WON)
- 2018, Walter Trout – Male Blues Artist (WON)
- 2018, Walter Trout, ‘We’re All In This Together’ – Rock Blues Album (WON)
- 2018, Sonny Landreth, ‘Live in Lafayette’ – Acoustic Blues Album (WON)
- 2017, Beth Hart – Female Blues Artist (WON)
- 2017, Quinn Sullivan – Sean Costello Rising Star Award (nominated)
- 2017, Walter Trout, ‘Alive in Amsterdam’ – Live Blues Recording (WON)
- 2016, Walter Trout, ‘Battle Scars’ – Rock Blues Album (WON)
- 2014, Beth Hart – Female Blues Artist (WON)
- 2013, Robert Cray, ‘Nothin But Love’ – Contemporary Blues Recording (nominated)
- 2013, Walter Trout, ‘Blues For the Modern Daze’ – Rock Blues Album (nominated)
- 2010, Joe Bonamassa – Male Blues Artist (nominated)

A2IM/LIBERA AWARDS (US/GLOBAL)

- 2022, Eric Bibb, ‘Dear America’ – Best Blues Record (nominated)
- 2021, Sonny Landreth, ‘Blacktop Run’ – Best Blues Record (nominated)
