= Mascot Records =

Dutch record label

- Parent company: Mascot Label Group
- Founded: 1990
- Genre: Rock; hard rock; heavy metal
- Country of origin: Netherlands
- Official website: mascotrecords.com

Mascot Records is a record label and rock music subsidiary of Mascot Label Group.

== Artists ==
- 10 Years
- Afterlife
- Agabas
- Any Given Sin
- Black Stone Cherry
- Calva Louise
- Conquer Divide
- Defects
- Dinosaur Pile-Up
- Dragged Under
- Earthside
- Imperial Tide
- King Falcon
- Kingdom Collapse
- Masters Of Reality
- Oxymorrons
- P.O.D.
- Shaman's Harvest
- Stengah
- Storm Orchestra
- THE HARA
- VOLA

Former Artists

- Agent Steel
- Ancient Rites
- Andreas Kisser
- Black Country Communion
- Big Jesus
- Black Sites
- Black Label Society
- Brides of Destruction
- Crobot
- Counting Days
- Creepmime
- Daize Shayne
- Dublin Death Patrol
- Eleven Pictures
- For Selena and Sin
- Fozzy
- Gob Squad
- Gojira
- Gory Blister
- Guilt Machine
- Heathen
- The Jelly Jam
- John 5
- Jordan Rudess
- Kris Barras Band
- Krux
- L.A. Guns
- Laberinto
- Levara
- Liar of Golgotha
- Lody Kong
- Marc Rizzo
- Meshiaak
- Michael Schenker Group
- Monster Truck
- Naked Gypsy Queens
- Nine Shrines
- Otherwise
- Pestilence
- Rockin'1000
- Sadus
- Skyforger
- Stoneghost
- Torque
- Tracer
- Triggerfinger
- Vandenberg's MoonKings
- Volbeat
- Yngwie Malmsteen
