= Rock Fest =

Annual US rock music and camping event

Coordinates: 45°02′38″N 91°10′40″W

- Genre: Hard rock, heavy metal
- Dates: Mid-July
- Location: Cadott, Wisconsin
- Years active: 1994–2019, 2021–Present
- Website: rock-fest.com

Rock Fest is a permanent music festival held annually in July on the Chippewa Valley Music Festival grounds in Cadott, WI.

The venue includes more than 7,500 campsites for campers. The amphitheater concert grounds host four days of rock concerts by national music acts each year. On site there are convenience stores, merch stores, concessions, and side stages that feature regional acts between main stage performances.

== Attendance ==
The annual attendance of Rock Fest is between 28,000 and 40,000 people daily, although crowds can reach numbers as high as 80,000 people.

== Lineups ==
=== 2025 ===
Wednesday, July 16

- Eve 6
- Drowning Pool
- Born of Osiris
- A Killer's Confession
- Convictions
- Left On Red
- The Convalescence
- Hearts and Hand Grenades

Thursday, July 17

- Rob Zombie
- Knocked Loose
- Slaughter to Prevail
- Architects
- Crossfade
- Kublai Khan TX
- The Plot in You
- Taproot
- Attila
- Dry Kill Logic
- Elijah
- Nuisance
- Fortunate Losers
- Lydia Can't Breathe
- Divide the Fall
- Gravel
- Crashing Wayward
- Crossbreed
- Dreams Aside
- Ignescent
- Dreamstereo
- Make Me Sick
- Valleykil
- Austin Marie

Friday, July 18

- Five Finger Death Punch
- Marilyn Manson
- In This Moment
- Nothing More
- Yelawolf
- August Burns Red
- Dead Poet Society
- Vended
- Mushroomhead
- Royale Lynn
- Cane Hill
- Nevertel
- Dead Superstar
- Clozure
- Emperors and Angels
- White Crosses
- 21 to Burn
- Harsh Reality
- Entundra
- Soulcage
- The Failsafe
- Anfang
- Morningstar
- Ember

Saturday, July 19

- Bad Omens
- Three Days Grace
- Ja Rule
- Poppy
- We Came as Romans
- Escape the Fate
- Scene Queen
- The Funeral Portrait
- Tim Montana
- Archers
- Return to Dust
- Throw the Fight
- Kings County
- Sinshrift
- Rebels Opera
- Dead Things
- Dellacoma
- 32 Headshots
- Normundy
- Shores of Acheron
- Small Town Sindrome
- Strange Days
- Un-Broken
- Seilies

=== 2024 ===
Wednesday, July 17

- Vince Neil (headliner)
- Quiet Riot
- Burning Witches
- Psychostick
- Shallow Side
- Feel
- Killakoi
- Evernoir

Thursday, July 18

- Thirty Seconds to Mars (headliner)
- 311
- Killswitch Engage
- Sevendust
- Dirty Honey
- Ayron Jones
- Upon a Burning Body
- Sleep Theory
- Citizen Soldier
- True Villains
- Crossbreed
- Until I Wake
- Cultus Black
- Softspoken

Friday, July 19

- Shinedown (headliner)
- Parkway Drive
- Beartooth
- Atreyu
- From Ashes to New
- Stabbing Westward
- Cold
- I See Stars
- Saul
- Silent Theory
- Uncured
- City of the Weak
- Living Dead Girl
- Kazha

Saturday, July 20

- Jelly Roll (headliner)
- Chevelle
- Of Mice & Men
- Fever 333
- The 2 Live Crew
- Struggle Jennings
- Austin Meade
- Liliac
- Holy Wars
- Another Day Dawns
- Blue Felix
- Kingdom Collapse
- Ignescent
- Sepsiss

=== 2023 ===
Wednesday, July 12

- Soul Asylum
- Alien Ant Farm
- Gemini Syndrome
- Tallah
- The Lonely Ones
- No Resolve
- Moon Fever
- Widow7

Thursday, July 13

- Pantera (headliner)
- Ice Cube
- In This Moment
- The Ghost Inside
- Jinjer
- Orianthi
- Suicide Silence
- Vended
- Fame on Fire
- Eva Under Fire
- Ghosts of the Mississippi
- Sin7
- Scattered Hamlet
- Rebel Queens
- Weekend Picnic
- Mvrrow
- Magg Dylan
- Dark Heavens
- Giznad
- Thrash of the Titans
- Carbellion
- Saint Tragedy

Friday, July 14

- Slipknot (headliner)
- Falling in Reverse
- Ice Nine Kills
- Asking Alexandria
- Wage War
- Mushroomhead
- Cherry Bombs
- Crobot
- Gideon
- Saul
- Emperors & Angels
- Nuisance
- Artifas
- 9th Planet
- Kingdom Collapse
- Versus Me
- Normundy
- The Almas
- Kings County
- Sons of Guns
- Shotgun Superstars
- Contingency
- FM Down

Saturday, July 15

- Godsmack (headliner)
- Papa Roach
- Highly Suspect
- Everclear
- Gwar
- Dorothy
- 10 Years
- New Years Day
- Plush
- Dayseeker
- Silvertung
- Bourbon House
- The SoapGirls
- Ratchet Dolls
- Relent
- Citizen Kane
- Lovely World
- Drift
- Old Voltage
- The Hybrid Theory
- Scarlet
- The Over Unders

=== 2022 ===
Wednesday, July 13

- Warrant (headliner)
- Lita Ford
- Firehouse
- Otherwise
- Islander
- Versus Me
- Paralandra
- Dead Original

Thursday, July 14

- Disturbed (headliner)
- Lamb of God
- Theory of a Deadman
- Avatar
- Hatebreed
- Ayron Jones
- Spiritbox
- Diamante
- Fire from the Gods
- Ded
- Wildstreet
- Sweet Addiction
- NonGrata
- Half Heard Voices
- Seilies
- Unkle Daddy
- The Midnight Devils
- Peace of Mind
- Rebel Queens
- The Issue
- Via

Friday, July 15

- Evanescence (headliner)
- Halestorm
- The Pretty Reckless
- Nothing More
- Black Veil Brides
- Escape the Fate
- Butcher Babies
- John 5 (replaced Nita Strauss)
- Volumes
- Lilith Czar
- Streetlight Circus
- Plague of Stars
- Lydia Can't Breathe
- Ratchet Dolls
- Once Around
- The Other LA
- Ignescent
- Fingertrick
- Bourbon House
- Fresh Fighters
- Sabbath Unleashed
- Motherwind

Saturday, July 16

- Shinedown (headliner)
- Mudvayne
- Jelly Roll
- Skillet
- Motionless in White
- Starset
- Shaman's Harvest
- From Ashes to New
- All Good Things
- Lacey Sturm
- Divide the Fall
- Eaon
- Dreams Aside
- Velvet Chains
- Crashing Atlas
- Splitdriven
- The Rumours
- Imperial Fall
- 10,000 Days
- Cowboys from Hell
- Lake Effect

=== 2021 ===
Wednesday, July 14

- Queensrÿche
- Slaughter
- Joyous Wolf
- Royal Bliss
- The Black Moods
- Stitched Up Heart
- Modern Mimes
- Unkle Daddy

Thursday, July 15

- Rob Zombie (headliner)
- Staind
- Anthrax
- Steel Panther
- Saint Asonia
- Memphis May Fire
- Fozzy
- Nonpoint
- Fire from the Gods
- Carnifex
- Any Given Sin
- GFM
- Falling Through April
- Scattered Hamlet
- Jett Threatt
- NIVRANA
- Digital Homicide
- Anything But Human
- Drama Queen
- Contingency
- Ignescent

Friday, July 16

- Limp Bizkit (headliner)
- Corey Taylor
- Philip H. Anselmo & the Illegals
- Badflower
- Of Mice & Men
- Tommy Vext
- All That Remains
- Bones UK
- Blacktop Mojo
- Crobot
- City of the Weak
- Throw the Fight
- Siin
- Silvertung
- Wildstreet
- Fool Fighters
- Dressed to Kill
- Hammer Down Hard
- Distal Descent
- Strange Daze
- Caster Volor

Saturday, July 17

- Korn (headliner)
- Danzig
- Chevelle
- Body Count
- Pop Evil
- We Came as Romans
- Gemini Syndrome
- Bad Omens
- Hyro the Hero
- Rachel Lorin
- Your Screaming Silence
- Evandale
- Stormbreaker
- Nuisance
- Gypsy Road
- Cowboys from Hell
- Strate Jak It
- Stellar Circuits
- Probable Cause
- FM Down

=== 2020 ===
2020 Rock Fest organizers postponed due to COVID-19. Scheduled for July 16-18.

Rock Fest Organizers said in a statement "In working with local health officials, we were told that having a festival of our size in July is at too high of a risk due to COVID-19. This is an unprecedented situation that we have to take seriously. The health and safety of our fans and rock music community is and always will be our #1 concern!"

Fans were offered refunds or the opportunity to roll their tickets over to the following year.

=== 2019 ===
Wednesday, July 17

- Jackyl
- Stryper
- Kix
- BobaFlex
- Rachel Lorin
- He-Nis-Ra
- Silvertung
- Streetlight Circus

Thursday, July 18

- Evanescence (headliner)
- Mastodon
- Skillet
- Starset
- Static-X
- Nonpoint
- DevilDriver
- Sylar
- Dope
- Rachel Lorin
- Revenant Soul
- Gabriel and the Apocalypse
- Sweet Addiction
- The 9th Planet Out
- Madman's Diary
- Bleak Sabbath
- The Zealots
- Cold Kingdom
- Krashkarma
- Stare Across Un-Broken

Friday, July 19

- Five Finger Death Punch (headliner)
- Breaking Benjamin
- Three Days Grace
- Killswitch Engage
- Asking Alexandria
- Bad Wolves
- Ice Nine Kills
- From Ashes to New
- I See Stars
- Shallow Side
- Rachel Lorin
- Helivs
- Stormbreaker
- Days to Come
- Sin7
- Who's Who
- Stone Type Pilots
- Ignescent
- Kore Rozzik
- Reason Define
- Catechize

Saturday, July 20

- Rob Zombie (headliner)
- Marilyn Manson
- In This Moment
- I Prevail
- P.O.D.
- Lacuna Coil
- Red Sun Rising
- Ded
- Diamante
- Eve to Adam
- Jacob Cade
- The Rumours
- Lydia Can't Breathe
- A Light Divided
- Piranha
- TNT
- Roxz
- Neverwake
- Standing Alliance
- Electric Revolution

=== 2018 ===
Wednesday, July 11

- Ace Frehley
- Skid Row
- Autograph
- SOiL
- Beyond Threshold
- Blacklite District
- Hammer Down Hard
- Filthy Sweet

Thursday, July 12

- Incubus (headliner)
- Rise Against
- Seether
- Nothing More
- Gwar
- Beartooth
- Red
- Through Fire
- Blacktop Mojo
- Dead Girls Academy
- The Missing Letters
- Old Voltage
- NIVRANA
- Nuisance
- Scattered Hamlet
- Brokenrail
- Everyday Losers
- Lydia Can't Breather
- GT3
- Lady Luck

Friday, July 13

- Godsmack (headliner}
- Halestorm
- Bush
- Dee Snider
- Pop Evil
- Trivium
- Fozzy
- Otep
- Ded
- Shallow Side
- Amerikan Overdose
- Cowboys From Hell
- Black Rainbow
- Arena
- Crashing Atlas
- Maryann Cotton
- Aedus
- Standing Alliance
- Picard
- Benjamin Raye Band

Saturday, July 14

- Disturbed (headliner)
- A Day to Remember
- Black Label Society
- Underoath
- Sevendust
- Adelitas Way
- Powerman 5000
- Attila
- Deadset Society
- Wayland
- GFM
- Ozzbournes
- Maiden Minneapolis
- The Goodbars
- Emissary Echo
- Screaming for Silence
- Hellbelly
- Strate Jak It
- Smiling Politely
- The Chagars
