= Protest vote =

Vote cast in an election as a form of political protest

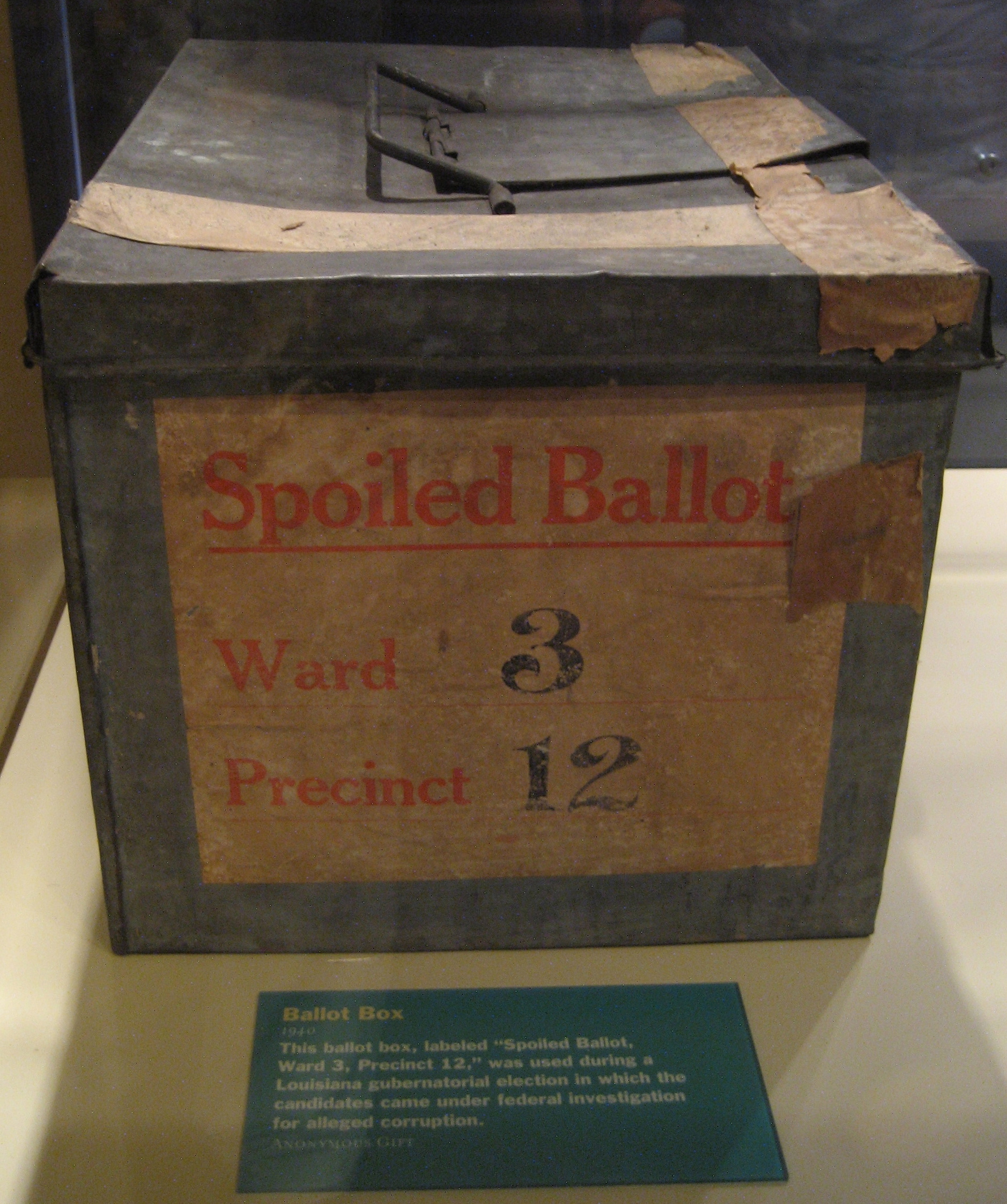
Spoiled votes may or may not be protest votes, but are often kept aside for challenges, further examination, or disposal.

A protest vote (also called a blank, null, spoiled, or "none of the above" vote) is a vote cast in an election to demonstrate dissatisfaction with the choice of candidates or the current political system. Protest voting takes a variety of forms and reflects numerous voter motivations, including political apathy. Where voting is compulsory, casting a blank vote is available for those who do not wish to choose a candidate, or to protest. Unlike abstention elsewhere, blank votes are counted.

Along with abstention, or not voting, protest voting is a sign of unhappiness with available options. If protest vote takes the form of a blank vote, it may or may not be tallied into final results. Protest votes may be considered spoiled or, depending on the electoral system, counted as "none of the above" votes.

== Types of protest vote ==
Protest votes can take many different forms:

- Blank ballots
- Null ballots
- Spoiled ballots
- None of the above votes
- Votes for a fringe candidate or party, or a less preferred candidate or party, or a fictitious person
- Organized protest votes
- Declined ballots

Protest voting tends to occur among voters who feel alienated but who have an alternative voting option, such as a third-party candidate in the United States, or who can register their displeasure with the political process by reducing the majority status of a likely winner. Alienation often leads to abstention from voting, but can also generate participation in the form of a protest vote. In the 1992 United States presidential election, for example, 14% of those who voted for Ross Perot said they would not have voted at all if he had not run.

Protest votes can take the form of blank, null, or spoiled ballots. Blank ballots are ballots with no markings on them. Null ballots are ballots that do not result in a valid vote because the ballot was filled out incompletely or incorrectly. Spoiled ballots are ballots that have been defaced, crossed-out, or otherwise marked in a way that makes the ballot ineligible; spoiled ballots most clearly indicate the presence of a protest vote. Write-in votes may also indicate protest voting; in the United States Mickey Mouse has historically been a popular choice.

Declined ballots occur where a voter shows up to the polling place, and declines to vote. This is an option in multiple Canadian provinces, including Ontario. However, this option does not exist in federal elections. To decline a ballot, one may return the ballot to the poll worker while stating that they decline to vote.

None of the above (NOTA) voting is rarely an option in U.S. politics, although it has been an option on Nevada ballots since 1976. NOTA voting is proposed as a state-legitimized method of allowing voters to signal discontent, although selecting a "none" option does not always indicate protest.

Other types of protest voting relate more to the choice of candidate or party selected for a valid vote than the ballot itself. Voting for a fringe candidate or less preferred party can be a way of signaling dissatisfaction with a leading candidate, party, or policy, or of reducing the margin of victory of the likely winner.

Protest voting organized by political parties or leaders also occurs, but tends to be rare and associated with extreme circumstances.

== Determining the presence of a protest vote ==
Distinguishing between ballots that have been deliberately cast as protest votes and those that are blank, null, or spoiled by an individual trying but failing to cast a valid vote is challenging. Blank votes are often associated with protest voting, but can also be indicators of a lack of information. Votes are blank, null, and spoiled more frequently in areas with high levels of illiteracy or limited language competency. Spoiled ballots, especially those that have been deliberately defaced or otherwise ruined, are a more reliable indicator of protest votes and of political sophistication.

Parliamentarians sometimes vote against bills that they would prefer over the status quo, but nonetheless vote against to protest that a better bill was not put forth.

== Significant protest vote events ==
One United States court case determined that voting is not an issue of free speech or expression, but rather about electing officials; in Burdick v. Takushi, 1992, the Supreme Court upheld a ban on write-in votes after Alan B. Burdick argued that Hawaii should be required to count his protest vote for Donald Duck.

In the parliamentary elections in Finland and Sweden, voters have also used Donald Duck as a protest vote. In Ukraine, the Internet Party nominated Darth Vader for mayoral elections in Kyiv and Odesa, and tried to nominate Darth Vader for presidency, although this application was rejected.

Protest voting is common in Latin America, where over 5.5% of ballots in presidential elections since 1980 have been blank or spoiled. During the 2000 presidential elections in Peru, candidate Alejandro Toledo withdrew over concerns about election integrity and encouraged his supporters to spoil their ballots as protest—an example of organized protest voting. In that election, around 31% of ballots cast were spoiled or blank.

Following the 2002 French presidential election, in which far-right leader Jean-Marie Le Pen arrived second behind conservative candidate Jacques Chirac, protest vote was named a contributing factor. The 2017 French presidential election, won by Emmanuel Macron, saw the highest level of protest voting and abstention in France since the late 1960s, with 4 million blank or spoiled ballots and an additional 12 million abstentions.

In Colombia, the blank vote has a legal path to force a repetition of an election and a change of the candidates in that election. According to the paragraph 1 of the article 258 of the Political Constitution of Colombia, if the blank vote in Colombia becomes the most voted option, the elections should be repeated once and, depending on the nature of the election, the parties should present new candidates or new lists of candidates. This gives the protest vote a way to express dissent with real electoral consequences. So far, the blank vote has not been majoritarian in presidential or congress elections in Colombia, but it already has forced to repeat some elections for mayor's office.

In certain parts of the United States, especially in the South, protest candidates often receive a large number of votes in Democratic Party presidential primaries due to a large presence of conservative Democrats who, while registered Democrats, often vote Republican at the federal level. This phenomenon received significant attention in the 2012 Democratic primaries, where attorney John Wolfe Jr. polled at 42% against incumbent President Barack Obama in the Arkansas primary, and prisoner Keith Judd received 41% in West Virginia. In Oklahoma, non-Obama candidates gathered a combined total of 43%, with the highest number of votes going to anti-abortion activist Randall Terry. The phenomenon showed up in later elections but on a smaller scale (as many former Democrats left the party). In the 2016 West Virginia Democratic primary, favorite son Paul T. Farrell Jr. received 9% of the vote and placed ahead of eventual nominee Hillary Clinton in one county. In the 2020 primary in that state, fellow favorite son David Rice received a similar 8%.

During the 2024 Democratic presidential primaries, a significant protest vote movement formed against Biden's support of Israel during the Gaza war. This movement persisted into the general election after voters similarly dissatisfied with Kamala Harris's stance on the conflict chose third-party candidates, with the majority of protest votes cast for Green Party candidate Jill Stein.

In the 2024 Russian presidential election, amid the exclusion of anti-war candidates from challenging incumbent President Vladimir Putin, anti-Putin activists employed the protest voting tactic known as Noon Against Putin, first proposed by jailed Russian opposition leader Alexei Navalny before his death. This involved gathering at polling stations on the last day of voting around midday to advocate for spoilt ballots such as writing Navalny's name or to cast votes for New People candidate Vladislav Davankov. While perceived as aligned with the Kremlin, Davankov incorporated anti-war sentiments reminiscent of the barred candidates, rendering him an alternative candidate to opposition voters as a means of protest voting. Despite the action, Davankov nevertheless received officially only 4% of the official vote, while independent exit polling conducted showed him overwhelmingly defeating Putin.

== Protest vote and abstention ==
Abstention may be a type of protest vote when it is not solely the result of political apathy or indifference towards politics. In systems where voting is compulsory, abstention may be an act of political disappointment. The anarchist movement rejects representative democracy in favor of a more direct form of government and has historically called for abstention as a form of protest. Active protest voting, whether through spoiled or blank ballots, tends to communicate dissatisfaction more effectively than abstention.

Abstaining increases the proportion of votes for the most popular candidate or party, while using a protest vote against the popular candidate or party can shrink a margin of victory. Reducing the margin may result in a hung parliament or a smaller difference between the parties in government, thus limiting the chance a single party will have control over the system.

== See also ==
- Anti-politics
- Donald Duck Party
- Donkey vote
- Election boycott
- Novelty candidate
- List of frivolous political parties
- Types of democracy
- Motion of no confidence
- Political apathy
- Single-issue politics
- Spoiler effect
- Uncommitted (voting option)
