= The War Within =

The War Within may refer to:

== Literature ==
- The War Within (Wells book), a 1994 book by Tom Wells about the war in Vietnam
- The War Within (Woodward book), a 2008 book by Bob Woodward about the George W. Bush administration
- The War Within, a novel by Carol Matas
- Transformers: The War Within, a 2002–2003 comics series

== Music ==
- The War Within (Shadows Fall album), 2004
- The War Within (Wrekonize album), 2013
- War Within (album), by Any Given Sin, or the title song, 2023
- "War Within", a song by Cavo from Thick as Thieves, 2012

== Other uses ==
- The War Within (film), a 2005 American political drama
- World of Warcraft: The War Within, a 2024 expansion pack

== See also ==
- Red Alert: The War Within, 2010 Indian crime drama film
