= War as metaphor =

Rhetorical trope, used to manage a perceived societal problem

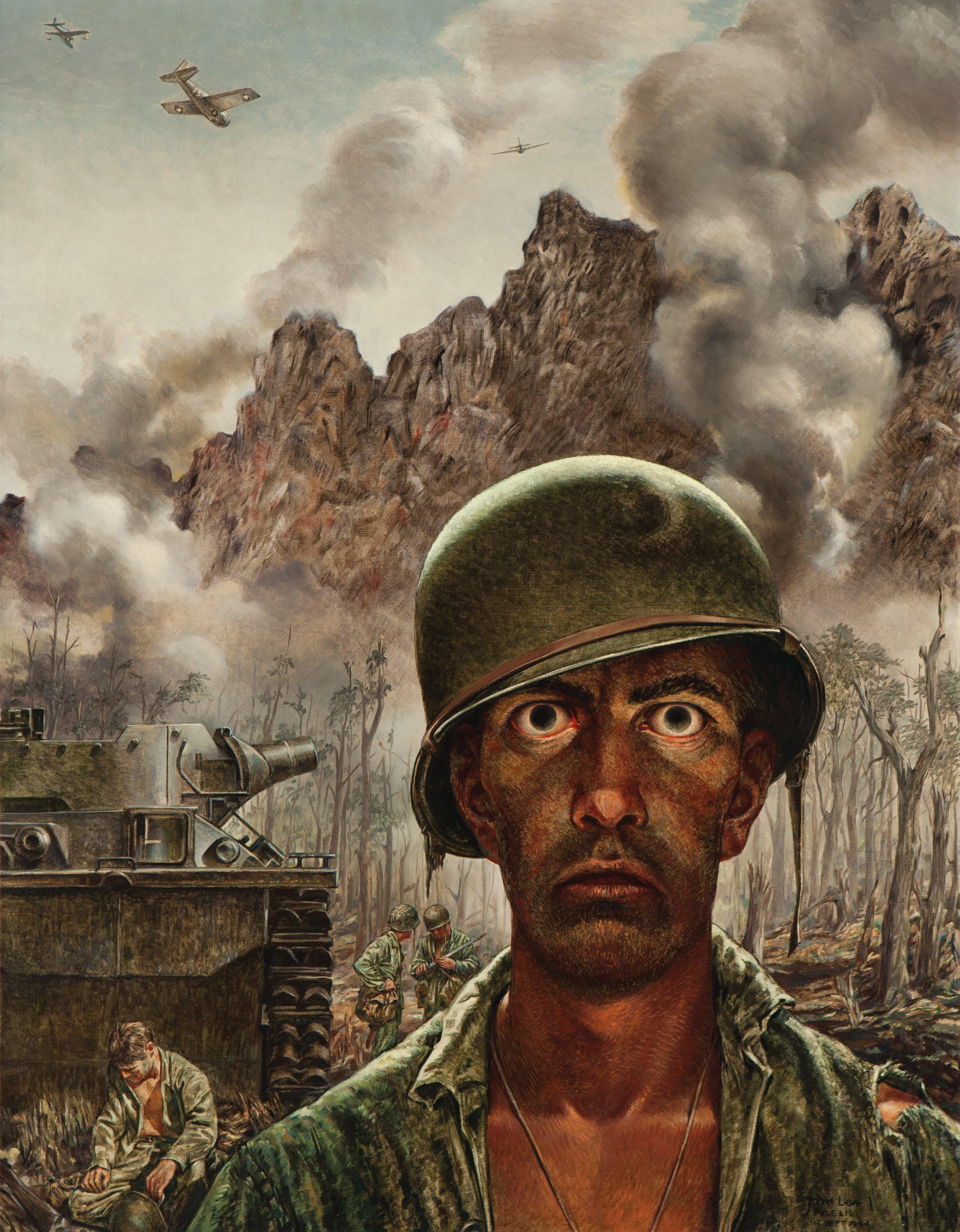
"The Two Thousand Yard Stare", a 1944 illustration by Thomas C. Lea III

The use of war as metaphor is a longstanding literary and rhetorical trope. In political usage, war metaphors are used to manage a perceived societal problem, with the concept taking the place of an individual or state enemy in true war. The war metaphor is sometimes invoked to pursue ordinary domestic politics.

Philosopher James Childress describes the use of war as a metaphor as a dilemma: "In debating social policy through the language of war, we often forget the moral reality of war." One fundamental problem is that it is often unclear when the "war" is over.

== Examples ==
Examples of war used as a metaphor, often on the form "War on..." or "War against...":

- "Customs war", also known as a "toll war" or "tariff war", a type of economic conflict between two or more states.
- "Trade war", an economic conflict often involving tariffs and trade barriers
- "War on crime", 1930s, J. Edgar Hoover
- "Cold War" or "War on Communism" or "War against Communism" (1947–1991), a period of hostility between the two dominant superpowers at the time, the United States and the Soviet Union. The Cold War in itself was never a direct war, but several proxy wars were carried out by both sides over the period.
- The Cultural Revolution (1966–1976) in China was launched as a "War against Revisionism". Marshall Lin Biao is given credit for inspiring war metaphors when he said in 1965, at the outset of the movement, "The battlefield of the Cultural Revolution cannot call a ceasefire. This is a war without that option."
- Jimmy Carter's application of "war" as metaphor for the energy crisis of 1974 described in Metaphors We Live By by George Lakoff and Mark Johnson describe
- "War on Poverty", an unofficial name for legislation first introduced by United States president Lyndon B. Johnson during his State of the Union address on 8 January 1964.
- "War on cancer", combined effort to decrease cancer mortality through improved prevention, detection, and treatment
- "War on drugs", US term referring to efforts to curtail illegal drug trade
- "War on gangs", national movement in the US to reduce gang-related activity, gang violence, and gang drug involvement
- "Culture war" (1991, 2000s), various conflicts and demographic trends in US history
- "War of ideas" (1993), The Heritage Foundation's James A. Phillips used the term "war of ideas" in describing the pivotal role played by the National Endowment for Democracy (NED) in the ideological battle for the protection of democracy.
- "War on terrorism" or "war on terror" (2001–2013) coined in 2001 by then United States president George W. Bush after the terrorist attacks of September 11, 2001 to mobilize an international military campaign. In 2013, President Barack Obama announced that the United States was no longer pursuing a war on terror, as the military focus should be on specific enemies rather than a tactic.
- "War on graffiti", municipal initiative described by Toronto mayor Rob Ford
- "War on cars", municipal initiative described by Toronto mayor Rob Ford
- "War on Want" is an anti-poverty charity based in London
- "War of the Romantics", a schism amongst 19th century European composers and musicians
- "War on I-4", nickname for the college football rivalry between the South Florida Bulls and the UCF Knights. The rivalry between the Tampa Bay Storm and the Orlando Predators of the Arena Football League was also called the "War on I-4".
- Emu War, an attempt to reduce the population of nuisance emus in Australia using military operations in 1932
- Global War on Error, a campaign to eliminate aviation errors
- War on COVID
- War on disinformation
- War on domestic extremism

Some wars are not proclaimed but rather a label used by adversaries:

- "War against Islam" (also called the "War on Islam"), a term coined in the 1990s and popularized after 2001 to describe a perceived campaign to harm, weaken or annihilate the societal system of Islam, using military, economic, social and cultural means.
- "War on Christmas", term in the US to describe perennial controversy occurring around Christmas
- War on Whistleblowers, a 2013 documentary by Robert Greenwald.
- "The War Within", may refer to several things
- "War on women", an expression in US politics used to describe certain Republican Party policies as a wide-scale effort to restrict women's rights, especially reproductive rights
- "War on Democracy" from the title The War on Democracy, a 2007 documentary film directed by Christopher Martin and John Pilger
- "War on Secrecy" from the title WikiLeaks: Inside Julian Assange's War on Secrecy, a 2011 book by David Leigh and Luke Harding telling the story of Julian Assange, WikiLeaks, and the leak by Chelsea Manning
- "War on Coal", a phrase used by the coal industry and its supporters to describe what they claim is an effort by the Obama administration to impose stringent regulations on coal power in the United States
- "War on Cops", a phrase used by Bill Johnson, executive director of National Association of Police Organizations. Also called "War on Police". Similar rhetoric was used by Donald Trump, Ted Cruz, and Scott Walker.
- "War on Science", used variously to describe academic postmodernism's criticism of objective reality or political opposition to the conclusions of science.
- During the COVID-19 pandemic, the president of France, Emmanuel Macron, repeated multiple times "We are at war". The prime minister of Greece, Kyriakos Mitsotakis, also used the metaphor. EU industry commissioner Thierry Breton said "We are at war with the virus. An economic war." US president Donald Trump said "I'm a wartime president. This is a war — a different kind of war than we’ve ever had." UK prime minister Boris Johnson said "We must act like any wartime government, and do whatever it takes to protect our economy."
- Nayib Bukele, President of El Salvador, declared a "war on gangs" and a state of exception on Sunday 27 March 2022. Between then and 8 June 2022, more than 38,000 people were arrested of a population of 6,8M.

== See also ==
- Inter arma enim silent leges ('In times of war, the law falls silent')
- Psychological warfare
- Spiritual warfare
- State of emergency
