= Virginia Film Festival =

Annual film festival held in Charlottesville, USA

Coordinates: 38°1′51.2″N 78°29′0.2″W

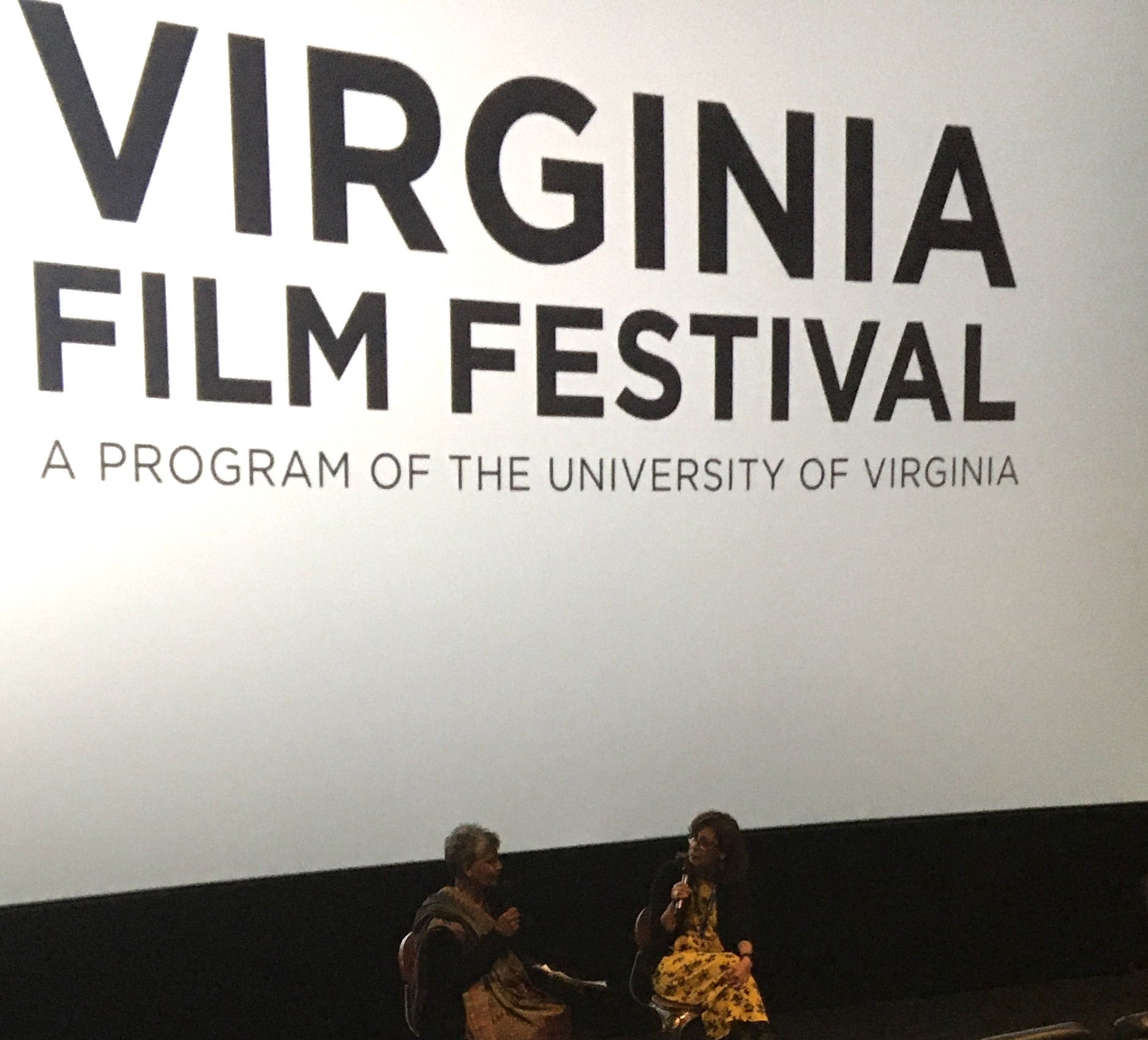
A film discussion at the 2019 Virginia Film Festival.

The Virginia Film Festival is a program of the University of Virginia in Charlottesville. The film festival is held annually during 4 days, usually in late October or early November.

== History ==
Created in October 1988, the Virginia Festival of American Film (renamed The Virginia Film Festival) was endorsed by the state's Department of Economic Development and adopted by the University of Virginia. The intent was twofold: to stimulate economic development by encouraging film production in Virginia and increasing tourism, and to meld the creative interests and crafts of the American film industry with the intellectual resources of a nationally ranked university.

In 1996, the festival was affiliated with the drama department of the University of Virginia. In 2002, the Festival moved to the Dean's office in the College of Arts and Science and then to the media studies department. The Festival's focus was expanded to encompass a broader range of international films, year-round programs, and a very active Film Society that presents films and guest speakers at the downtown Vinegar Hill Theatre.

The first two premieres at the festival were Child's Play and Mystic Pizza.

In 2009, Jody Kielbasa, the founding director of the Sarasota Film Festival, was brought on as the new director of the Virginia Film Festival.

From 1990 through 2009, Virginia Film Festival chose a different theme each year on which to base its film program. Past themes are listed below. Starting in 2010, the Festival announced its intention to leave the themed approach in favor of more flexible programming. The VAFF celebrated its 25th anniversary in 2012.

- 1990 – "Music & The Movies"
- 1991 – "Movie Made In America"
- 1992 – "The Reel South & Other Worlds"
- 1993 – "Film Noir"
- 1994 – "Love & Other Obsessions"
- 1995 – "U.S. & Them"
- 1996 – "Wild Spaces, Endangered Places"
- 1997 – "Caged!"
- 1998 – "Cool"
- 1999 – "Techno Visions"
- 2000 – "Animal Attractions"
- 2001 – "Masquerades"
- 2002 – "Wet"
- 2003 – "$$$"
- 2004 – "Speed"
- 2005 – "In/Justice"
- 2006 – "Revelations"
- 2007 – "Kin Flicks"
- 2008 – "Aliens!"
- 2009 – "Funny Business"

Venues that have hosted the festival include the Paramount Theater, the Violet Crown and Vinegar Hill theaters in downtown Charlottesville, and facilities at the University of Virginia.

== Films and guests ==
Notable screenings have included a 25th Anniversary tribute to In the Heat of the Night and Sidney Poitier, Distinguished Filmmaker presentations to Robert Altman, John Sayles, Emile de Antonio, and Arthur Penn, as well as Roger Ebert's "shot by shot" workshops on classics such as Vertigo, Sunset Boulevard, and The Third Man. Memorable premiere events have included an advance screening of Mother & Child with actress Cherry Jones and director Rodrigo Garcia and a live producer's commentary of the show True Blood featuring its creator Alan Ball.

Notable guests have included Jimmy Stewart, Fay Wray, Gregory Peck, Ossie Davis, Nick Nolte, Norman Mailer, Jerzy Kosinski, Sissy Spacek, William Kennedy, Ann Beattie, Sandra Bullock, Nicolas Cage, Anthony Hopkins, Robert Mitchum, Gov. Doug Wilder, Kathleen Turner, Sigourney Weaver, Richard Roundtree, Jack Valenti, bank robber John Wojtowicz Vanessa Redgrave, Gena Rowlands, William Styron, Ross McElwee, Matthew Broderick, John Waters, Norman Jewison, Cherry Jones, Mary Badham, Horton Foote, Sherman Brothers, Tony Goldwin, Robert Duvall, Calder Willingham, Christoph Waltz, Peter Bogdanovich, Allen Hughes, Martin Luther King III, Derrick Borte, Robbie Jones, Ethan Hawke, Annete Bening, Terry McAulife, Diane Rehm, Vince Gilligan, Wanuri Kahui, Liana Liberato, Ann Dowd, Steven J. Kung, Ric Burns, Vanessa Bell Calloway, Shelly Chopra Dhar, Dennis Christopher, Kevin Jerome Everson, John Grisham, Debra Martin Chase, Patrick O'Connell, Kwaku Alston, Jamelle Bouie, Soraya Nadia McDonald, Alonso Duralde, Jeremy O. Harris, Martha Plimpton, Danny Strong, Carlos Aguilar, Robert Daniels, William Antholis.

== Awards ==
=== 39th Virginia Film Festival (2026) ===
- Career Producer Honor – Todd Black, American film producer

=== 38th Virginia Film Festival (2025) ===
- 2025 VAFF Audience Award – Narrative Feature – Hamnet
- 2025 VAFF Audience Award – Documentary Feature – Come See Me In The Good Light
- 2025 VAFF Audience Award – Narrative Short – Synthesize Me
- 2025 VAFF Audience Award – Documentary Short – All the Empty Rooms
- 2025 Programmers' Award – Narrative Feature – Late Shift
- 2025 Programmers' Award – Documentary Feature – Ghost Elephants
- 2025 Programmers' Award – Narrative Short – Nervous Energy
- 2025 Programmers' Award – Documentary Short – On Beyond Fences

=== 37th Virginia Film Festival (2024) ===
- 2024 VAFF Audience Award – Narrative Feature – Bob Trevino Likes It
- 2024 VAFF Audience Award – Documentary Feature – Luther: Never Too Much
- 2024 VAFF Audience Award – Narrative Short – Irma
- 2024 VAFF Audience Award – Documentary Short – Makayla’s Voice
- 2024 Programmers' Award – Narrative Feature – We Shall Not Be Moved
- 2024 Programmers' Award – Documentary Feature – The Bitter Pill
- 2024 Programmers' Award – Narrative Short – Evanescence
- 2024 Programmers' Award – Documentary Short – Roommates

=== 36th Virginia Film Festival (2023) ===
- 2023 VAFF Audience Award – Narrative Feature – Origin (Ava DuVernay)
- 2023 VAFF Audience Award – Documentary Feature – American Symphony (Matthew Heineman)
- 2023 VAFF Audience Award – Narrative Short – Dreams of Home (Justin Kaminuma)
- 2023 VAFF Audience Award – Documentary Short – Black Godfather of Scuba (Matt Kay)
- 2023 Programmers' Award – Narrative – American Fiction (Cord Jefferson)
- 2023 Programmers' Award – Documentary – No Ordinary Campaign (Christopher Burke)
- 2023 Programmers' Award – Narrative Short – For the Moon (Nile Price)
- 2023 Programmers' Award – Documentary Short – 1-15-41 (Jay Pendarvis Jr.)
- Visionary Award – Ava Duvernay (Origin)
- Directorial Achievement Award – Matthew Heineman (American Symphony)
- Breakthrough Director Award – Cord Jefferson (American Fiction)
- Changemaker Award – Nikki Giovanni (Going to Mars: The Nikki Giovanni Project)
- Chronicler Award – Nicole Newnham (The Disappearance of Shere Hite)
- Craft Award – Kazu Hiro (Maestro)
- Governor Gerald L. Baliles Founder’s Award – Ricardo Preve (Sometime, Somewhere)

=== 35th Virginia Film Festival (2022) ===
- 2022 VAFF Audience Award – Narrative Feature – Living
- 2022 VAFF Audience Award – Documentary Feature – Dani's Twins
- 2022 VAFF Audience Award – Narrative Short – Night Ride
- 2022 VAFF Audience Award – Documentary Short – Stranger at the Gate
- 2022 Programmers' Award – Narrative Feature – Karaoke
- 2022 Programmers' Award – Documentary Feature – Refuge
- 2022 Programmers' Award – Narrative Short – Home of the Brave
- 2022 Programmers' Award – Documentary Short – Tuning René Marie
- Screenwriting Achievement Award – Meg LeFauve
- Breakthrough Star Award – Jonathan Majors
- Changemaker Award – Dustin Lance Black
- Chronicler Award – Sam Pollard
- Craft Award – Eugenio Caballero
- Governor Gerald L. Baliles Founder’s Award – Jamie Sisley
