= Culinary linguistics =

Culinary linguistics, a sub-branch of applied linguistics, is the study of food and language across various interdisciplinary fields such as linguistics, anthropology, sociolinguistics, and consumption politics and globalisation.

== Methodology ==
=== Written language ===
Scholarly inquiry that deals with written language employs semiotics and ethnolinguistics methodologies, utilizing operational frameworks such as corpus linguistics, language ideology, written discourse analysis, dialectology, and theoretical lexicography. Research typically engages with various media forms, official documents or white papers, and text found in food production sites (e.g., markets, production facilities, restaurants). This generally entails the empirical analysis of words and phrases (e.g., idioms or metaphors) to investigate intertextual relations between writer/producer, audience, and sociocultural/political realities.

=== Spoken language ===
Another significant fraction of culinary linguistics deals with spoken language in which methodologies such as food-oriented interviews, collaborative translation, participant observation, and focus group dialogues are used and are more prominent. This usually invokes similar concepts like language socialization, spoken discourse analysis, and paralinguistics.

=== Visual language ===
Apart from written and spoken means of communicating about foods, one also uses body language to portray their attitudes towards food. For example, simply from reading one's expressions, the audience can tell whether the food is "nice", "disgusting" or "mmm" to the taster. Besides expressions, actions such as emptying a glass can inform interlocutors that it is the drinker's final sip, as well as indicating the end of the talk.

== Food politics ==
Culinary linguistics mainly addresses persuasive writing in food politics, occurred in the processes of production, distribution, labelling, agency, responsibility, and consumption. For example, an excerpt from Guy Cook's article "Sweet talking: food, language, and democracy" reads:

"You can buy the same product at a low price in one aisle, or at a high price in another aisle. The difference is in the description. A loaf of white bread without words, for example, costs £0.75p for 400g, but white breadcrumbs catchily labelled as 'a handful of breadcrumbs' cost £1.19 for 100g. People are sweet-talked into buying such things." (Cook 2010)

Prominent topics across food language and politics include product labelling, debates over genetically modified food (GM foods), and organic foodmarketing (see food marketing).

=== Product labelling ===
Applying culinary linguistics to product labelling, research broaches the themes of linguistic ambiguity; rhetorical figures (e.g., alliteration, metaphor, hyperbole and superlatives, rhythm and poetic phrasing); narrative techniques; and sociolinguistics that pertains to sensory/sensual connotations associated with food description (cf. food and sexuality).

For example, the themes of ambiguity and sensual language can be extrapolated via syntactic analysis (e.g., noun-modifiers) of labels such as:

"masterfully prepared sweetened real fruit juice pieces, made from a blend of pomegranate and other select concentrated fruit juices", are dipped in "our extra creamy pure dark chocolate" to create this "decadent taste sensation" (Cook 2010)

Potato chips – "veggie chips"; milk shakes – "smoothies"; sugary drinks – "flavored water"; etc. (Irmak et al. 2011)

==== Product labelling and health ====
Arguments around vague language in food labelling are also tied to issues of health (cf. nutrition facts label). For example, research on infant formula addresses fine print as a critical realization of multimodality and its effects on communication, particularly in conveying the saliency of health information. Research have additionally expounded on the links between “the ambiguity inherent in the naming of some products” and the differences in perceptions of healthfulness and taste by dieters and non-dieters. Furthermore, such research broaches psycholinguistics by noting that these different groups demonstrate differing capacities to subconsciously alter their taste perceptions based on languages in food labels. Existing linguistic research on food labelling and health also addresses objective meal sizes, nutrient content claims (e.g., "low fat"), health benefit claims (e.g., "may increase bone density"), and brand names.

==== Product labelling and environmentalism ====
Culinary linguistics further delineates ties with the social and environmental facets of food politics. For example, conventional marketing strategies, that appeal to emotion and self interest, have supplanted rhetorics around environmentalism.

=== GM and anti-GM debates ===
More closely aligned with political discourse analysis, culinary linguistics has also been applied to debates about GM food products, paying particular attention to lexical items and connotations. Language associated with emotion and hysteria is often employed in pro-GM arguments through referencing anti-GM rhetoric, a linguistic technique that derides their opposition's persuasions as fearmongering rather than objectively substantial. Furthermore, military metaphors (see war as metaphor) were noted to be commonplace in these arguments, foregrounding the perception of threat.

== Language and food service ==
=== Menus ===
Daniel Jurafsky observed the utility of culinary linguistics in his research that analysed thousands of menus in the United States, asserting that prices could be accurately predicted simply from looking at the language used to describe dishes in these menus.

=== Food reviews ===
Reviews are written by food critics to provide feedback about food service in restaurants. For "eaters", reading these reviews help them to decide the places to eat. For linguists, analysing the language such as metaphors and emotions, written in the reviews, increases their understanding about human psychology. Studies about the use of language in food reviews revealed patterns in the word choice for good and bad reviews. Good reviews reflect positive feedback about the customers' experiences in restaurants while bad reviews show customers' dissatisfaction about their experiences when they visit the restaurants. However, a comparison of studies conducted with different populations, revealed that these patterns varied across cultures.

According to a study conducted by researchers at Stanford and Carnegie Mellon University, they discovered patterns in the word choices of American food reviewers, by analysing one million online restaurant reviews on Yelp. Their findings showed that people generally use positive emotional words such as "delicious" or "amazing" in good reviews while negative emotional words such as "horrible" or "gross" were found in bad reviews. Specifically, in bad reviews, a phenomenon known as negative differentiation surfaced. Compared to good reviews that contained positive vague words, in bad reviews, food reviewers describe the taste, smell and appearance with greater precision and wider range of vocabulary. They also used words related to tragedy or trauma, on top of using collective pronouns such as "we" to emphasize their victimisation by the poor dining experiences.

The study also showed the difference in metaphors used in good reviews to describe dining experiences in expensive and cheap restaurants. Reviews containing metaphors of sex and sensual pleasure, such as "seductively seared foie gras" were often used to describe foods served in expensive restaurants. On the other hand, metaphors of drugs or addiction such as "the wings are addicting" were used to describe the food in cheap restaurants.

A similar study was conducted to study the food reviews in Turkey. Its findings revealed that Turkish food reviewers do not use sexual or drug metaphors in their reviews, possibly due to their culture. Generally, they used expressions related to "to faint" to express delight in all their reviews. Unlike Americans, Turkish food reviewers do not differentiate between the price of the restaurants. Instead, they prioritise authentic and healthy Turkish foods. Hence, reviews containing these words are deemed to be good reviews.

Another feature in food reviews that determines the quality of food is the use of onomatopoeia. Food reviewers use onomatopoeia to express the various degrees of taste, texture and appearance of the foods to help their readers visualise the images. In a study about the usage of onomatopoeia in food reviews, researchers gathered common words that were used to describe different cuisines. For example, zuruzuru (Japanese: ずるずる) was used in reviews to describe noodles such as ramen. Another similar study further explained that since such words resemble the sounds of eating noodles, the food reviews can be understood by foreigners as well.

== Linguistics in food preparation ==
=== Food blogs ===
food blogging is part of the written and asynchronous genre of CMC Computer-mediated communication as they revolve around the preparation, consumption and evaluation of food in all varieties and contexts. By allowing continuous revisions and comments to be added, food blogs reflect the relations of food with its readers across varied cultural backgrounds.

==== Special purpose discourse ====
A prominent lexical feature of food blogs is special purpose vocabulary, or how David Crystal in The Cambridge Encyclopedia of the English Language terms it as occupational variety, indicated by "the frequent and central use of special vocabulary and jargon." The corpus of food blogs include terms from various categories. Diemer and Frobenius distinguish the vocabulary on food blogs into seven categories:

- food jargon (e.g., recipe);
- ingredients, food and recipe types (e.g., salt or cream);
- non-English terms (e.g., Vollkorn and gelato);
- kitchen tools (e.g., bowls and pans);
- preparation methods (e.g., heating and baking);
- amounts and measures (e.g., cups or minutes);
- blog-specific terminology (e.g., comments and posts).

==== Culinary verb use ====
The most common non-auxiliary verbs are action verbs that describe activities in the lexical field of cooking, like make, add, cook, serve, take, chop, bake or fry. In addition, there are activities related to food procurement, such as buy or pick, and consumption, such as eat.

=== Recipes ===
Recipes may come in written or spoken form. Written recipes are considered procedural discourse, which is agency neutral and time neutral. “This agency/ time neutrality is reflected in the use of the imperative form”, which has no overt subject and no grammatical tense in English. Spoken recipes can be likened to narratives and sets of instructions, as they “tend to switch back and forth between the first person past tense of the former and the second person imperative of the latter"

=== Cooking shows ===
Cooking shows or cookery programmes are forms of spoken discourse in culinary linguistics. It involves the performance of food preparation in front of a live or television audience by a host, typically, a celebrity chef.

==== Instructions ====
An essential part of cooking shows is the delivery of instructions during food preparation. Such instructions are usually influenced by the linguistic styles of different celebrity chef personalities. For example, British celebrity chef Jamie Oliver is known for employing slang in his performance of culinary speech. He often substitutes the traditional terms like “to add” with a slang verb, “to chuck” (meaning ‘to throw’).

==== Expressing emotions ====
The medium of television allows for emotions in culinary discourse to be conveyed through visual and aural signifiers.

===== Visual language =====
The use of facial expressions and body language are visual ways in which emotions arising from food preparation and consumption are communicated to the audience.

"In humans, the characteristic facial expressions that coincide with the experience of disgust and distaste include behaviors such as gaping and nose wrinkling, are usually elicited by nausea or revulsion. These negative expressions are typically evoked by unpalatable tastes, such as bitter, both in children and in adults. Palatable tastes, such as sucrose, are thought to induce sensory pleasure, which elicits less frequently expressed appetitive reactions, such as facial relaxation and smiling and sucking movements."

===== Verbal language =====
In terms of verbal cues, vocal sounds such as the onomotopoeia mmm often denote a sense of satisfaction and pleasure towards the consumption of food. The personification of food is also a linguistic technique of establishing intimacy and emotional connection in the performance of food preparation and consumption. This may sometimes involve interaction between chefs and their culinary creation.

In one of the episodes of his cooking show, Jamie Oliver "is bending the spaghettini so that they will fit tightly into the pan into the boiling water, and as he does so, he addresses the pasta as if it were one of his 'mates': We've got some quite good quality pasta here, right, so this is spaghettini it cooks in around 7 minutes right so this goes in boiling salted water it’s supposed to be, just bend it around, get in there, go on mate, get in there, here we go…"

== See also ==
- Culinary name
