= Matt Daniels (disambiguation) =

Matt Daniels (born 1989) is an American football player.

Matt Daniels may also refer to:

- Matthew Daniels, founder of Alliance for Marriage
- Matt Daniels, band member of Shallow Side
- Lieutenant Matt Daniels, a fictional character in The Hunt for Eagle One
- Matt Daniels, a fictional character in the British TV series Sugar Rush
