= Eve to Adam =

American hard rock band

- Origin: New York / Florida, U.S.
- Genres: Hard rock, post-grunge
- Years active: 1997–present
- Members: Taki Sassaris; Ilyn Nathaniel; Jeff Raines; Ronny Gutierrez
- Past members: Alex Sassaris; Damien Bergeron; Markus Wells; Gaurav Bali; Lawrence Coleman; Matt Spaker; AJ Pappas; Dave Schultz; Dave Rivenbark
- Website: evetoadam.com

Eve to Adam was an American hard rock band formed in New York City in 1997. They have released five albums and had three songs reach the top 40 on Billboard's Mainstream Rock Chart, as well as one song, "Immortal", that broke the top 15 at Active Rock in 2014.

== History ==
Inspired by hard rock bands like Led Zeppelin, Guns N' Roses and Van Halen, brothers Taki and Alex Sassaris formed Eve to Adam in Florida in 1997. They soon moved to New York City and connected with songwriter and producer Desmond Child (Aerosmith, Kiss, Bon Jovi) in 1998. After recruiting guitarist Gaurav Bali and bassist Dave Schultz, the band began playing shows in 1999. They found themselves scoring a slot to open for Mötley Crüe and Scorpions on the Maximum Rock Tour that year.

In 2000, Desmond Child dropped the act because the band did not share his vision of having the duo perform his more pop-oriented songs. AJ Pappas joined the band lending his expertise. After losing financing for recording, the band eventually found alternate funds and released their first album Auburn Slip in 2001, then toured the eastern US for two years. Their EP Antidote was released in November 2003.

In 2006, AJ left the band to play with Popa Chubby, but the band then discovered Riv (Dave Rivenbark) from Gainesville to play bass and the band drove to Los Angeles and recorded songs for what would become their second album Queens to Eden, released in June 2007. That year, Eve to Adam opened for Daughtry on the 54 sold-out shows of his first national headlining tour. The band then played dates with Saliva, 3 Doors Down, Crossfade, Smile Empty Soul, The Exies, Tesla and 12 Stones.

In June 2011, the band took on a new bass player and released their third album Banquet For A Starving Dog. The band then toured with Halestorm and In This Moment on the Jägermeister Music Tour and performed at the Rock on the Range and Rocklahoma festivals in 2012. Also that year, Banquet was re-released with a bonus track, a cover of Alice Cooper's "School's Out".

In September 2013, Eve to Adam released their fourth album Locked & Loaded, produced by Dave Bassett (Halestorm), Eric Bass (Shinedown) and Elvis Baskette (Incubus, Falling in Reverse, Alter Bridge, Tremonti). To Support the album release the band embarked on the US tour as direct support for the band Creed

In early 2014, with yet another new bass player and the addition of rhythm guitarist Adam Latiff (recruited after his short stint with Puddle of Mudd), Eve to Adam toured with Escape The Fate. In the summer, the band performed at Rock Fest, a four-day festival held annually in Cadott, Wisconsin, alongside The Pretty Reckless, Live, Cheap Trick and Aerosmith. In the fall, the band parted ways with their management and record label, claiming breaches in contract and differences in direction. They created an online fundraiser to replace their gear, which was being withheld by the management company. The fundraiser was a success and the band headlined their own '"88 MPH Tour" in the spring of 2015 featuring a new line up consisting of lead guitarist Markus Wells (Hollow Drive, Screaming For Silence), guitarist Lawrence Coleman, and Matt Spaker.

In September 2016 this lineup entered the studio with producer Michael 'Elvis' Baskette to begin recording for the band's next record. After failed attempts to secure a new label, the band found a home with Roctagon, who selected label artist Zardonic to remix these recordings to become the band's 2017 release Odyssey. These songs were also remixed again and rereleased in 2019 as Ithaca.

In early 2017, Chrissy Warner (Scars of Tomorrow, Butcher Babies, Dope) filled in on drums for the Tongue Tied Tour.

On April 5 2026, Even to Adam announced on the bands facebook page that the band was "no more", stating "Update!!!! Everyone is doing good working hard. Unfortunately at this time Eve to Adam is no more we love all our fans and appreciate everyone who supported us through the years. Don’t know if we will get back together one day but until that time we see ya later. Happy Easter everyone many blessings."

== Members ==
Former members

- Taki Sassaris - lead vocals
- Ilyn Nathaniel - bass, backing vocals
- Jeff Raines – drums
- Ronny Gutierrez – guitars
- Markus Wells - lead guitar, backing vocals
- Matt Spaker - bass, vocals
- Lawrence Coleman - guitar, vocals
- Alex Sassaris – drums
- Wyatt Cooper - drums
- Damien Bergeron – guitars
- Guarav Bali - lead guitar
- AJ Pappas - bass
- Dave Rivenbark - bass

== Discography ==
=== Albums ===
- Auburn Slip (2001) (Mikendra Records)
- Queens to Eden (2007) (KDS Music Group)
- Banquet for a Starving Dog (2011) (3 for 5 Records)
- Locked & Loaded (2013) (3 for 5 Records)
- Odyssey (2017) (Rocktagon Records)
- Ithaca (2018) (Curtain Call Records) (re-release and remix of Odyssey)

=== EPs ===
- Antidote (2003)

=== Singles ===
- "151" (2007)
- "Gift" (2008)
- "Comin' Home (A Stranger)" (2008)
- "Run Your Mouth" (2011)
- "Reach" (2011) #40 Mainstream Rock, #39 Active Rock
- "School's Out" (2012)
- "Straightjacket Supermodel" (2013) #38 Mainstream Rock, #36 Active Rock
- "Immortal" (2013) #17 Mainstream Rock, #13 Active Rock (2014)
- "No Easy Way Out" (2019)
- "Day Drinkin'" (2019)
