= Paul T. Farrell Jr. =

American politician (born 1972)

- Born: Paul Thomas Farrell Jr. July 1, 1972 (age 54)
- Education: University of Notre Dame (B.A.); West Virginia University (J.D.)
- Political party: Democratic
- Spouse: Jacqueline K. Farrell
- Children: 3

Paul Thomas Farrell Jr. (born July 1, 1972) is an American attorney from Huntington, West Virginia who ran for President of the United States in the 2016 West Virginia Democratic primary.

== Early life and education ==
Paul Thomas Farrell Jr. was born to Judge Paul Thomas Farrell and Charlene Marie Linsenmeyer on July 1, 1972. Farrell spent his first few years in Morgantown, West Virginia before moving to Huntington. There he would graduate from Huntington East High School in 1990. Farrell would later graduate from University of Notre Dame in 1994, and the West Virginia University College of Law in 1997, where he was the managing editor of the Law Review.

== 2016 presidential campaign ==
Ballot access

Percentage of vote received by county <5% 5–10% 10–15% 15–20% >20%

On January 28, 2016, Farrell filed for President of the United States for the Democratic Party in West Virginia. He cited West Virginia's disenchantment with the national candidates as his motivation for running, noting U.S. President Barack Obama's poor showing in the 2012 Democratic Primary in West Virginia. Farrell did not plan to run in any additional states, instead saying he would like to bring national attention to the 'economically gutted regions of the state' caused by the so-called war on coal. Farrell came in third in the West Virginia primary, receiving just under 9 percent of the vote. In his best performance, Farrell came in second place in Mingo County, beating Hillary Clinton by 113 votes. He lost to Bernie Sanders, who won every county in the state.

== Career ==
Farrell practiced for 15 years at the law firm of Greene, Ketchum, Farrell, Bailey & Tweel where he was a partner. His work at Greene Ketchum focused primarily on medical malpractice and personal injury lawsuits.

In January 2020, Farrell launched his own law firm, Farrell Law.

== Opioid epidemic ==
Farrell's home state of West Virginia has been the epicenter of the opioid epidemic. Between 2007 and 2012, drug distribution companies shipped 780 million doses of opioids to West Virginia, and 1,728 overdose deaths occurred. In 2017, Farrell filed a series of lawsuits against the drug company distributors under the state's public nuisance laws. The suits, filed on behalf of various counties, seek to hold the drug distribution companies accountable for the cost incurred fighting the epidemic. In Cabell County alone, 40 million tablets were distributed in a five-year period, more than 400 for each of the 96,000 people who reside there.

Farrell work in the opioid cases is the subject of the 2024 documentary film The Bitter Pill.
