= War Within (album) =

Studio album by Any Given Sin
- Released: August 4, 2023
- Recorded: 2018–2022
- Genre: Hard rock, heavy metal, industrial rock
- Length: 39:16
- Label: Mascot Records

Any Given Sin chronology
Forbidden (2015)	War Within (2023)

Professional ratings
Review scores
Source	Rating
Distorted Sound	8/10
GBHBL	8/10
Metal Planet Music	8/10
Metal.de	7/10
Musikreviews.de	12/15
Rock 'N' Load	10/10

War Within is the debut album by American rock band Any Given Sin, released on August 4, 2023. The band supported the album with a North American tour with Shallow Side.

== Track listing ==
1. "War Within" - 3:33
2. "Calm Before the Storm" - 3:44
3. "Another Life" - 3:39
4. "Cold Bones" - 3:43
5. "Follow You" - 3:23
6. "Insidious" - 3:34
7. "Ball and Chain" - 3:20
8. "The Way I Say Goodbye" - 3:27
9. "House on Fire" - 3:26
10. "Dynamite" - 3:48
11. "Still Sinking" - 3:39

== Personnel ==
- Vic Ritchie - vocals
- Mike Conner - guitar
- Rich Stevenson - bass
- Mike Showalter - drums
