= Trial by Fire (song) =

Single by Saul

from the album Rise as Equals
- Released: November 27, 2019
- Recorded: 2019
- Length: 3:50
- Label: Independent
- Songwriters: Chris Dawson; Jim Beattie; Blake Bedsaul; Zach Bedsaul
- Producers: Jim Beattie; Blake Bedsaul; Zach Bedsaul

Saul singles chronology
"Brother" (2019)	"Trial by Fire" (2019)	"King of Misery" (2020)

"Trial by Fire" is a song by the American heavy metal band Saul. It was released on November 27, 2019, on their debut album Rise as Equals as the second single.

== Charts ==
Chart (2019)	Peak position
US Mainstream Rock (Billboard)	34
