= Brother (Saul song) =

Song by the American heavy metal band Saul

Single by Saul

from the album Aeons and Rise as Equals
- Released: January 25, 2019
- Recorded: 2019
- Length: 4:19
- Label: Independent
- Songwriters: Blake Bedsaul; Zach Bedsaul
- Producers: Chris Dawson; Blake Bedsaul; Zach Bedsaul

Saul singles chronology
"Brother" (2019)	"Trial by Fire" (2019)

"Brother" is a song by the American heavy metal band Saul. It was released on January 25, 2019, on their debut album Rise as Equals as the lead single.

== Charts ==
Chart (2019)	Peak position
US Mainstream Rock (Billboard)	29
