= 2016 West Virginia Democratic presidential primary =

- May 10, 2016

Candidate	Bernie Sanders	Hillary Clinton	Paul T. Farrell Jr.
Home state	Vermont	New York	West Virginia
Delegate count	18	11	0
Popular vote	124,700	86,914	21,694
Percentage	51.41%	35.84%	8.94%
- County results Sanders 40–50% 50–60% 60–70%

Results by county of Paul T. Farrell, Jr. <5% 5–10% 10–15% 15–20% >20%

The 2016 West Virginia Democratic presidential primary was held on May 10 in the U.S. state of West Virginia as one of the Democratic Party's primaries ahead of the 2016 presidential election.

The Republican Party held primaries in two states, including their own West Virginia primary, while for the Democratic Party this was the only primary on that day.

In a heavily white, working-class state where voters were angry about the Obama administration's policies, Bernie Sanders easily outpolled Clinton. Thirty percent of Democratic primary voters came from a coal household, and Sanders won 63 percent of these.

== Opinion polling ==
List of polls
Main article: West Virginia Democratic primary, 2016

Delegate count: 29 Pledged, 8 Unpledged Winner: Bernie Sanders
Primary date: May 10, 2016

Poll source	Date	1st	2nd	3rd	Other
Primary results	May 10, 2016	Bernie Sanders; 51.4%	Hillary Clinton; 35.8%	Paul Farrell; 8.9%	Others; 3.9%
MetroNews Margin of error: ±4.0% Sample size: 315	April 22-May 2, 2016	Bernie Sanders; 47%	Hillary Clinton; 43%		Undecided 11%
Public Policy Polling Margin of error: ±3.9% Sample size: 637	April 29-May 1, 2016	Bernie Sanders; 45%	Hillary Clinton; 37%		Undecided 18%
West Virginia Veterans/Thirty-Ninth Street Strategies Margin of error: ±3.9% Sample size: 600	March 2–6, 2016	Hillary Clinton; 44%	Bernie Sanders; 31%	Paul Farrell; 6%	Keith Judd 1% Others 7% Undecided 11%
Orion Strategies Margin of error: ±5.6% Sample size: 306	February 20–21, 2016	Bernie Sanders; 32%	Hillary Clinton; 24%		Undecided 44%
REPASS Research Margin of error: ±4.9% Sample size: 411	February 11–16, 2016	Bernie Sanders; 57%	Hillary Clinton; 29%		
Orion Strategies Margin of error: ±4.9% Sample size: 306	August 27, 2015	Hillary Clinton; 23%	Joe Biden; 16%	Bernie Sanders; 12%	Undecided 49%
Prism Surveys Margin of error: ± 3.21% Sample size: 900	August 21, 2015	Hillary Clinton; 36%	Bernie Sanders; 32%		Undecided 32%

== Results ==
West Virginia Democratic primary, May 10, 2016
Candidate	Popular vote		Delegates		
Candidate	Count	Percentage	Pledged	Unpledged	Total
Bernie Sanders	124,700	51.41%	18		18
Hillary Clinton	86,914	35.84%	11	8	19
Paul T. Farrell Jr.	21,694	8.94%			
Keith Judd	4,460	1.84%			
Martin O'Malley (withdrawn)	3,796	1.57%			
Rocky De La Fuente	975	0.40%			
Uncommitted	—N/a		0	0	0
Total	242,539	100%	29	8	37

=== County results ===
County	Bernie Sanders		Hillary Clinton		Paul T. Ferrell		Others		Total votes
County	%	#	%	#	%	#	%	#	Total votes
Barbour	51.47%	996	35.66%	690	8.53%	165	4.34%	84	1,935
Berkeley	49.24%	3,994	43.95%	3,565	2.71%	220	4.10%	333	8,112
Boone	51.92%	2,423	26.83%	1,252	15.83%	739	5.42%	253	4,667
Braxton	51.39%	1,330	34.85%	902	8.54%	221	5.22%	135	2,588
Brooke	51.35%	1,807	37.97%	1,336	7.73%	272	2.95%	104	3,519
Cabell	46.18%	5,408	37.89%	4,437	14.45%	1,692	1.48%	174	11,711
Calhoun	62.06%	854	22.75%	313	8.50%	117	6.69%	92	1,376
Clay	50.98%	755	29.37%	435	14.52%	215	5.13%	76	1,481
Doddridge	58.85%	236	28.93%	116	7.48%	30	4.74%	19	401
Fayette	52.28%	3,609	33.84%	2,336	9.78%	675	4.10%	283	6,903
Gilmer	52.87%	645	28.36%	346	10.08%	123	8.69%	106	1,220
Grant	46.75%	187	41.75%	167	8.00%	32	3.50%	14	400
Greenbrier	52.92%	2,871	35.02%	1,900	9.55%	518	2.51%	136	5,425
Hampshire	52.85%	1,056	33.13%	662	8.41%	168	5.61%	112	1,998
Hancock	54.10%	2,285	36.74%	1,552	6.08%	257	3.08%	130	4,224
Hardy	46.14%	885	34.20%	656	11.00%	211	8.66%	166	1,918
Harrison	49.09%	5,406	38.27%	4,214	7.71%	849	4.93%	543	11,012
Jackson	50.00%	1,810	39.97%	1,447	7.02%	254	3.01%	109	3,620
Jefferson	50.23%	3,267	44.86%	2,918	2.31%	150	2.60%	169	6,504
Kanawha	47.90%	13,654	45.12%	12,863	4.69%	1,336	2.29%	653	28,506
Lewis	54.89%	1,240	31.78%	718	8.37%	189	4.96%	112	2,259
Lincoln	47.12%	1,523	31.81%	1,028	16.46%	532	4.61%	149	3,232
Logan	50.48%	3,216	23.50%	1,497	20.30%	1,293	5.72%	365	6,371
Marion	52.45%	5,355	35.00%	3,573	8.10%	827	4.45%	454	10,209
Marshall	56.11%	2,618	31.16%	1,454	7.16%	334	5.57%	260	4,666
Mason	51.68%	1,781	35.58%	1,226	9.40%	324	3.34%	115	3,446
McDowell	55.23%	1,488	30.33%	817	8.69%	234	5.75%	155	2,694
Mercer	51.38%	3,239	34.47%	2,173	8.60%	542	5.55%	350	6,304
Mineral	49.43%	1,120	37.82%	857	7.50%	170	5.25%	119	2,266
Mingo	48.32%	2,432	21.42%	1,078	23.64%	1,190	6.62%	333	5,033
Monongalia	57.60%	8,142	35.27%	4,986	5.26%	743	1.87%	265	14,136
Monroe	50.00%	834	36.51%	609	8.21%	137	5.28%	88	1,668
Morgan	55.09%	682	39.26%	486	1.94%	24	3.71%	46	1,238
Nicholas	52.86%	1,959	29.52%	1,094	12.36%	458	5.26%	195	3,706
Ohio	52.91%	3,377	39.01%	2,490	5.50%	351	2.58%	165	6,383
Pendleton	46.83%	539	40.83%	470	7.65%	88	4.69%	54	1,151
Pleasants	54.99%	551	33.33%	334	9.18%	92	2.50%	25	1,002
Pocahontas	54.69%	828	34.81%	527	5.81%	88	4.69%	71	1,514
Preston	56.14%	1,720	31.36%	961	8.09%	248	4.41%	135	3,064
Putnam	51.26%	3,271	40.09%	2,558	5.94%	379	2.71%	173	6,381
Raleigh	52.49%	4,986	34.58%	3,285	8.77%	833	4.16%	395	9,499
Randolph	52.23%	2,494	31.79%	1,518	10.64%	508	5.34%	255	4,775
Ritchie	57.98%	356	32.74%	201	6.35%	39	3.93%	18	614
Roane	52.93%	1,004	39.06%	741	5.06%	96	2.95%	56	1,896
Summers	51.06%	1,063	37.51%	781	7.64%	159	3.79%	79	2,082
Taylor	51.84%	1,112	35.71%	766	8.39%	180	4.06%	87	2,145
Tucker	60.82%	773	25.96%	330	7.47%	95	5.75%	73	1,271
Tyler	60.22%	436	28.18%	204	7.60%	55	4.00%	29	724
Upshur	52.81%	1,073	36.61%	744	7.58%	154	3.00%	61	2,032
Wayne	45.92%	2,920	30.54%	1,942	19.99%	1,271	3.55%	226	6,359
Webster	53.77%	841	24.68%	386	15.92%	249	5.63%	88	1,564
Wetzel	56.54%	1,751	27.28%	845	11.11%	344	5.07%	157	3,097
Wirt	55.73%	438	28.63%	225	10.69%	84	4.95%	39	786
Wood	53.23%	4,560	37.27%	3,193	6.96%	596	2.54%	218	8,567
Wyoming	52.01%	1,500	24.62%	710	18.86%	544	4.51%	130	2,884

== Analysis ==
Although West Virginia had breathed new life into Clinton's 2008 presidential campaign eight years earlier, it failed to deliver for Clinton's front-running campaign in 2016. Clinton lost every county in the state to Bernie Sanders.

Sanders's West Virginia victory came from strong support among workers in the coal industry; fifty-five percent of West Virginia's Democratic voters with coal workers in their households voted for Sanders, while only 29 percent voted for Clinton. His easy win was likely fueled by Clinton's comments in March about her plans for redeveloping economically depressed coal-mining areas, which yielded the widely circulated soundbite "We're going to put a lot of coal miners and coal companies out of business."

Analysts speculated Sanders's win in West Virginia came not from support for his own coal policies, but from a rejection of the Obama administration's. Sanders was also helped by large numbers of Republican cross-over voters. Thirty-nine percent of Sanders voters stated they planned to vote for Donald Trump over Sanders in the November general election.
