= Versus Me =

American metalcore band

- Origin: Janesville, Wisconsin, U.S.
- Genres: Metalcore, electronicore, industrial metal, alternative metal, progressive metal
- Years active: 2014–present
- Members: Lee Milbrandt; Dustin Hansen; James Milbrandt; J.J. Johnson

Versus Me is an American metalcore band from Janesville, Wisconsin, that formed in 2014. A year later they released their debut single "(A)Tension" featuring Craig Mabbitt from Escape the Fate in 2015.

== Background ==
Versus Me is made up of the Milbrandt brothers, James and Lee, who were previously the guitarist and bassist of Serianna (formed in Wisconsin), Dustin Hansen (Isles of Aura) and J.J. Johnson (Call Upon the Sovereign). Former members include: Patrick Thompson, the co-founding guitarist for Alesana (officially formed in North Carolina), Clint Greendeer who previously performed with Guardians (formed in Wisconsin), and Dustin Helgestad who previously performed with Crossing The Delaware (formed in Wisconsin).

== Members ==
- James Milbrandt – vocals (2014-present)
- Dustin Hansen – guitar (2017-present)
- Lee Milbrandt – bass guitar (2014-present)
- J.J. Johnson – drums (2017-present)

Former

- Patrick Thompson – guitar, vocals (2014-2017)
- Clint Greendeer – guitar (2014-2017)
- Dustin Helgestad – drums (2014-2016)

== Discography ==
=== Albums ===
- Changes (2016)
- Continuous (2019)

=== Singles ===
- "(A)Tension" featuring Craig Mabbitt (2014)
- "An American Tale" featuring Josh Napert (2015)
- "An American Tale" (Acoustic) (2015)
- "PartyBlood" (2015)
- "EXP" (2017)
- "Real Life Monsters" featuring Eric Vanlerberghe (2017)
- "Snake Cake" (2017)
- "Left Here" (2018)
- "Shout" (2018)
- "Not Going Back" (2018)
- "Far Behind" (2019)
- "Heavy Breathing" (2019)
- "Give Me a Reason" (2019)
- "Cruel Summer" (Taylor Swift Cover) (2019)
- "Give Me a Reason" (Acoustic) (2019)
- "Violence" (2020)
- "Down" (2021) – No. 37 Mainstream Rock Songs
- "Terrified" (2022) – No. 32 Mainstream Rock Songs
- "In the Dark" (2023)
- "Blackout" (2023)
- "Better Off Alone" (2024)
- "Worst In You" (2025)
- "Snakes" (2025)
- "Echoes" (2025)

== Videography ==
Year	Title	Album	Director
2014	"(A)Tension"	Changes	Ryan Blaske
2015	"An American Tale" (Acoustic)	Changes	Jon Lindquist
2015	"Partyblood"	Changes	Jon Lindquist
2016	"Just So You Know"	Changes	Elizabeth Wadium & Brian Kaufma
2017	"EXP"	Single	N/A
2017	"Real Life Monsters"	Single	HK Visual Creations
2018	"Left Here"	Single	Ryan Blaske
2018	"Shout (Tears for Fears Cover)"	Single	Eddie Curran & Enterprise Films
2019	"Heavy Breathing"	Continuous	Eddie Curran & Enterprise Films
2019	"Give Me a Reason"	Continuous	Eddie Curran & Enterprise Films
2019	"Cruel Summer (Taylor Swift Cover)"	Single	Eddie Curran & Enterprise Films
2020	"Violence"	Single	Eddie Curran & Enterprise Films
2021	"Control"	Single	Eddie Curran & Enterprise Films
2021	"Down"	Single	Eddie Curran & Enterprise Films
2022	"Ex's & Oh's (Atreyu Cover)"	Single	Eddie Curran & Enterprise Films
2022	"Terrified"	Single	Eddie Curran & Enterprise Films
2023	″Blackout″	Single	
2024	"Better Off Alone"	Single	
2025	"Worst In You"	Single	
2025	"Snakes"	Single	
2025	"Echoes"		

== Tours and festivals ==
Dates	Tour name	Bands on tour
September 30 - October 1, 2017	Sonic Boom 2017	Five Finger Death Punch, Rise Against, Mastodon, Stone Sour
November 30 - December 18, 2016	The Incubus Tour	Famous Last Words, The Funeral Portrait
December 6–12, 2015	Holiday Run Tour	I Prevail, XXI
September 26, 2015	Sonic Boom 2015	Five Finger Death Punch, In This Moment, Papa Roach,
September 5, 2015	Taste of Madison	We Came As Romans, Trapt, Bobaflex, and Aranda
July 28, 2015	Warped Tour 2015 - Milwaukee	
June 12, 2015	Sonic Boom Pre-party	I Prevail
