= The War Within (Wells book) =

The War Within: America's Battle over Vietnam
- Author: Tom Wells
- Language: English
- Subject: History, United States, Vietnam, War
- Publisher: University of California Press
- Publication date: April 13, 1994
- Publication place: United States
- Media type: Print
- Pages: 706
- ISBN: 0-520-08367-9

The War Within: America's Battle over Vietnam is a non-fiction book by Tom Wells that was published by University of California Press on April 13, 1994. This book discusses the influence of the anti-war movement had over American policy decisions affecting the Vietnam War, proposing that the movement had a significant impact on restricting, minimizing, or ending the war."

The book describes the domestic struggle over the war. Although neither definitive nor comprehensive, it does present the views of both sides on the events of the period after 1965.

== Thesis ==
The book is an expanded version of Wells' doctoral dissertation in Sociology at the University of California, where he studied under political activist Todd Gitlin. In this study, Wells advocated the view that the anti-war movement was not a failure. He believed that, in fact, it "played a major role in constraining, de-escalating and ending the war." Indeed, in his opinion, the movement could have been more successful had its activists not failed to "appreciate their actual power." Wells developed his thesis in ten chronologically organized chapters. He devotes more than half of the work to the period of 1967–1970, in addition to analyzing the movement's public impact.
