= 2016 West Virginia Republican presidential primary =

- May 10, 2016
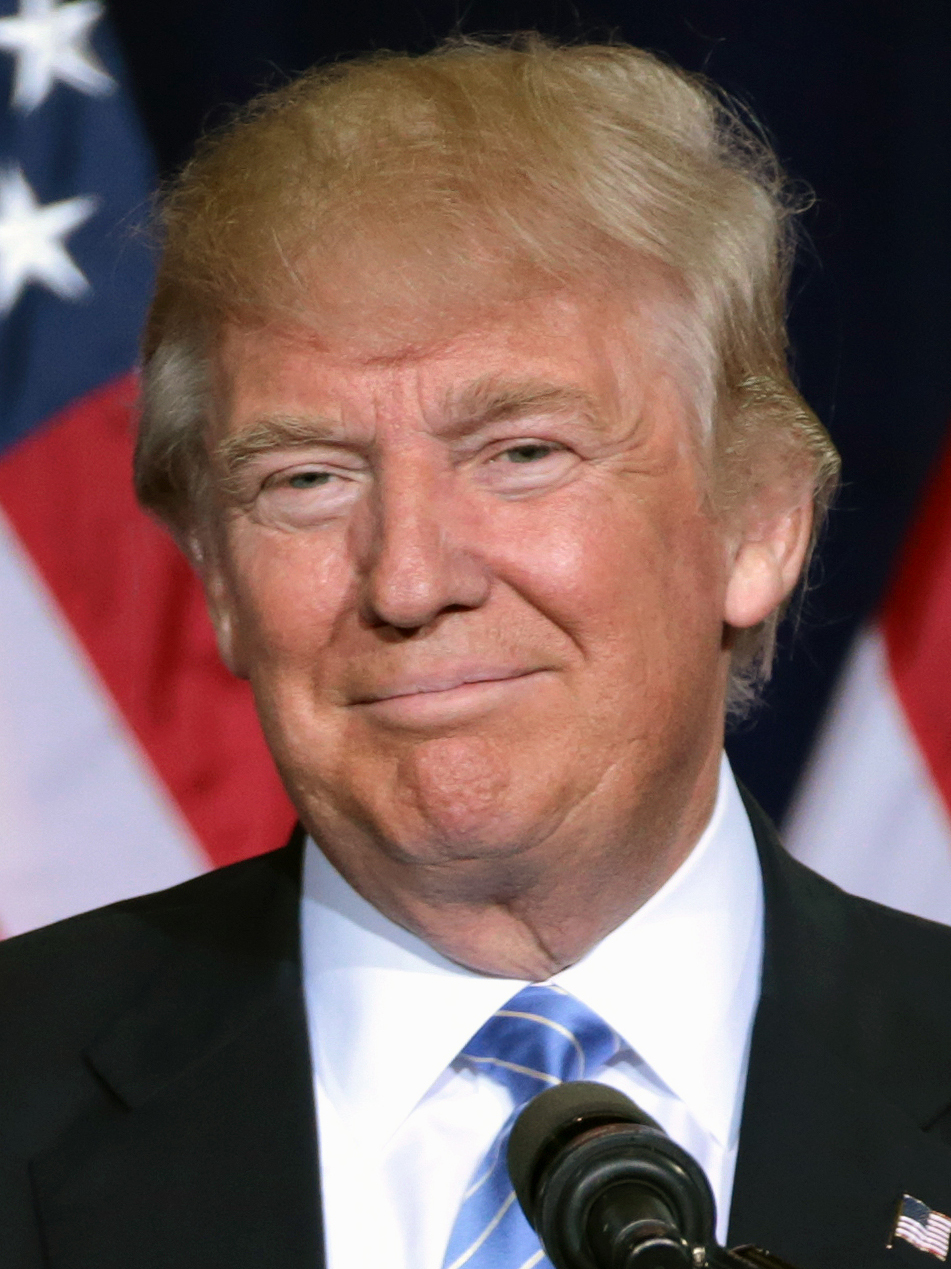

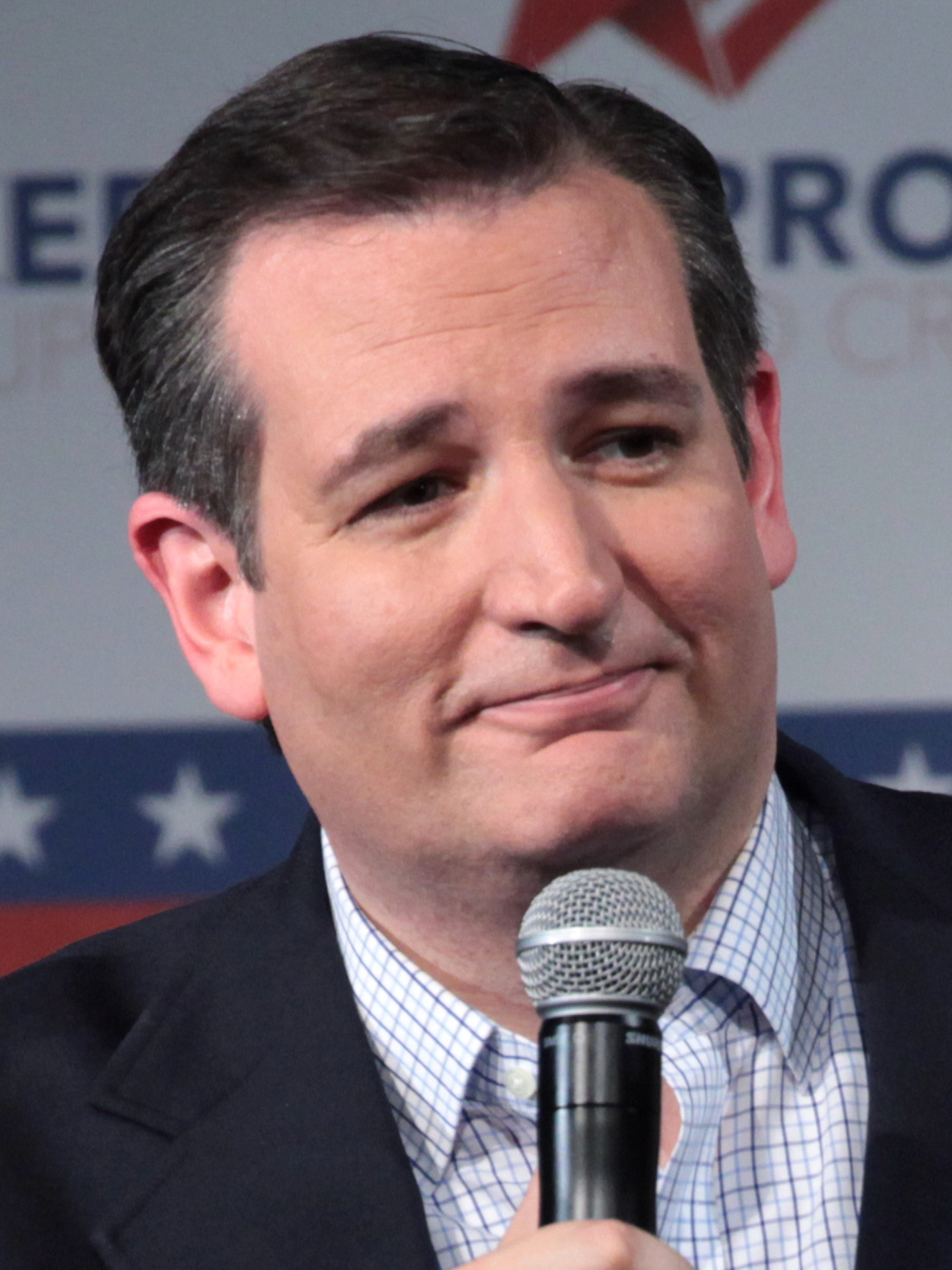

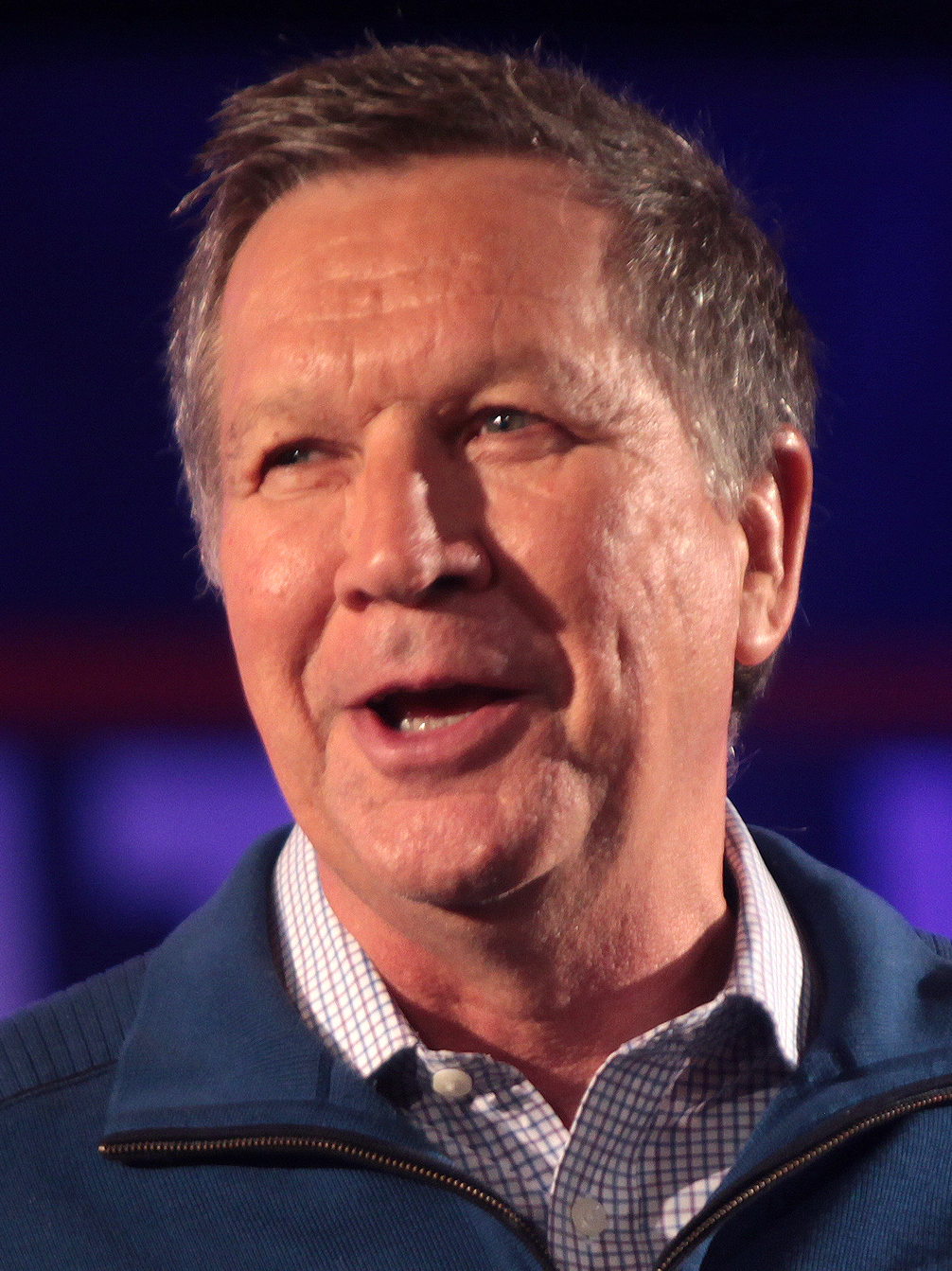
Candidate	Donald Trump	Ted Cruz	John Kasich
Home state	New York	Texas	Ohio
Delegate count	30	0	1
Popular vote	157,238	18,301	13,721
Percentage	77.05%	8.97%	6.72%
County results
Trump
60–70%
70–80%
80–90%
>90%

The 2016 West Virginia Republican presidential primary was held on May 10 in the U.S. state of West Virginia as one of the Republican Party's primaries ahead of the 2016 presidential election. The only candidate on the ballot who had not withdrawn was Donald Trump.

Both the Democratic Party and the Libertarian Party hold their own West Virginia primaries on the same day.

== Opinion polling ==
List of polls
Main article: United States presidential election in West Virginia, 2016

Winner: Donald Trump
Primary date: May 10, 2016

Poll source	Date	1st	2nd	3rd	Other
Primary results	May 10, 2016	Donald Trump; 77.01%	Ted Cruz; 8.98%	John Kasich; 6.74%	Ben Carson 2.17%, Marco Rubio 1.43%, Jeb Bush 1.14%, Rand Paul 0.89%, Mike Huckabee 0.87%, Chris Christie 0.36%, Carly Fiorina 0.33%
R.L. Repass & Partners/MetroNews Margin of error: ± 4% Sample size: 228	April 22– May 2, 2016	Donald Trump; 57%	Ted Cruz; 25%	John Kasich; 14%	Undecided 4%
Public Policy Polling Margin of error: ± 4.2% Sample size: 549	April 29– May 1, 2016	Donald Trump; 61%	Ted Cruz; 22%	John Kasich; 14%	Undecided 3%
Metro News Margin of error: ± ?% Sample size: 159	February 11–16, 2016	Donald Trump; 40%	Ted Cruz; 20%	Marco Rubio; 15%	Ben Carson 10%, John Kasich 6%, Jeb Bush 4%, Carly Fiorina <1%, Chris Christie <1%, Not Sure 4%
Orion Strategies Margin of error: ± 4.9% Sample size: 406	August 25, 2015	Donald Trump; 29%	Marco Rubio; 8%	Ben Carson; 7%	Jeb Bush 7%, Mike Huckabee 7%, Ted Cruz 5%, Scott Walker 2%, Carly Fiorina 2%, John Kasich 1%, Rand Paul 1%, Undecided 32%
Harper Polling Margin of error: ± 6.3% Sample size: 242	April 9–11, 2015	Jeb Bush; 23%	Mike Huckabee; 20%	Scott Walker; 13%	Ben Carson 8%, Ted Cruz 8%, Rand Paul 7%, Chris Christie 5%, Marco Rubio 4%, Rick Santorum 1%, Undecided 11%

== Results ==
West Virginia Republican primary, May 10, 2016
Candidate	Votes	Percentage	Actual delegate count		
Candidate	Votes	Percentage	Bound	Unbound	Total
Donald Trump	157,238	77.05%	30	0	30
Ted Cruz (withdrawn)	18,301	8.97%	0	0	0
John Kasich (withdrawn)	13,721	6.72%	1	0	1
Ben Carson (withdrawn)	4,421	2.17%	0	0	0
Marco Rubio (withdrawn)	2,908	1.43%	0	0	0
Jeb Bush (withdrawn)	2,305	1.13%	0	0	0
Rand Paul (withdrawn)	1,798	0.88%	0	0	0
Mike Huckabee (withdrawn)	1,780	0.87%	0	0	0
Chris Christie (withdrawn)	727	0.36%	0	0	0
Carly Fiorina (withdrawn)	659	0.32%	0	0	0
David Eames Hall	203	0.10%	0	0	0
Uncommitted			3	0	3
Unprojected delegates:			0	0	0
Total:	204,061	100.00%	34	0	34
Source: The Green Papers
