= Blacktop Mojo =

Rock band from Palestine, Texas, U.S.

- Origin: Palestine, Texas
- Genres: Post-grunge; hard rock
- Years active: 2012–present
- Labels: Cuhmon; Sand Hill
- Members: Matt James; Nathan Gillis; Catt Murtis; Malcolm Booher; Ryan Kiefer
- Past members: Kenneth Irwin; Chris Davis; Chuck Wepfer
- Website: www.blacktopmojo.com

Blacktop Mojo is a rock band from Palestine, Texas. The band consists of lead vocalist Matt James, drummer Nathan Gillis, bassist Catt Murtis and guitarists Malcolm Booher and Ryan Kiefer.

The band was founded by James and Gillis in 2012.

== Discography ==
=== Studio albums ===
- I Am (2014)
- Burn the Ships (2017)
- Under the Sun (2019)
- Blacktop Mojo (2021)
- Pollen (2024)
- Discount Fireworks (2026)

=== Extended plays ===
- Static (2020)

=== Singles ===
Song	Year	Peak chart positions	Album
Song	Year	US Main.	Album
"I Am"	2014	—	I Am
"Where The Wind Blows"	2017	27	Burn The Ships
"Dream On"	2018	31	Burn The Ships
"Can't Sleep"	2019	27	Under The Sun
"Tail Lights"	2021	—	Blacktop Mojo
"Wicked Woman"	2021	—	Blacktop Mojo
"Strike Me"	2022	—	Non-album single
"Red Enough"	2024	—	Pollen
"Like Wild Horses"	2024	—	Pollen
"As The Light Fades"	2024	—	Pollen
"I Can't Tell"	2024	—	Pollen
"Time the Killer"	2026	—	Discount Fireworks

== Band members ==
Current members

- Matt James – lead vocals, acoustic guitar (2012–present)
- Nathan Gillis – drums (2012–present)
- Matt “Catt” Murtis – bass, backing vocals (2015–present)
- Malcolm Booher – lead guitar, backing vocals (2021–present)
- Ryan Kiefer – rhythm guitar (2012–2022, 2023–present)

Former members

- Kenneth Irwin – lead guitar (2012–2018)
- Chris Davis – bass (2012–2015)
- Chuck Wepfer – rhythm guitar (2018–2023)
