= The Bitter Pill (2024 film) =

2024 documentary film

The Bitter Pill is a 2024 documentary film which explores the work of West Virginia attorney Paul T. Farrell Jr. who heads the largest ever civil litigation in United States history against major pharmaceutical companies in their role in the opioid epidemic.
