= Shallow Side =

American rock band

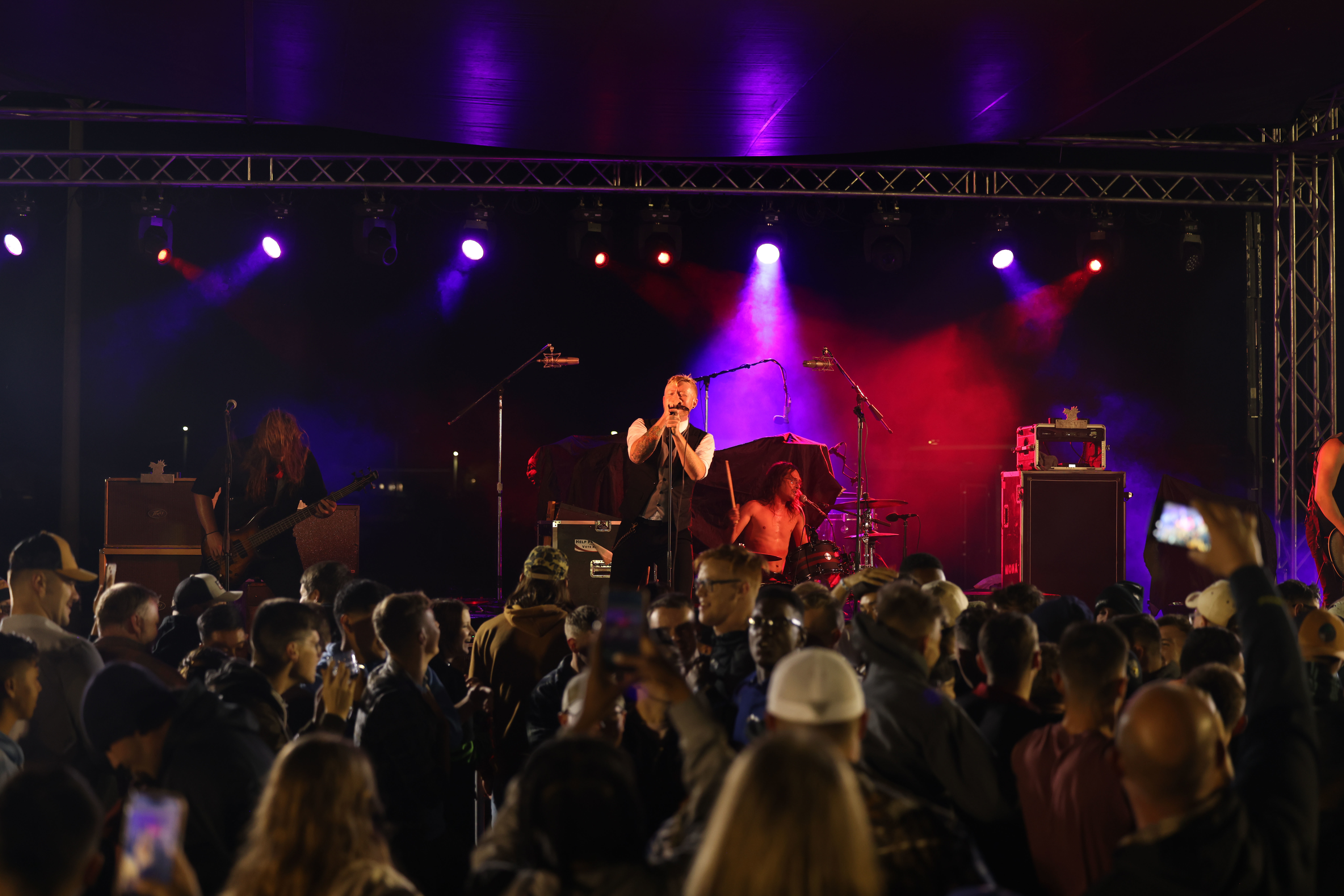

Background information
- Origin: Cullman, Alabama
- Genres: Hard rock; alternative rock; post-grunge
- Years active: 2010-present
- Labels: Thermal Entertainment, LLC
- Members: Eric Boatright; Heath Fields; Samuel Bower; Codey Red
- Past members: Seth Trimble; Cody Hampton; Justin Smith; Matthew Daniels
- Website: http://shallowside.net/

Shallow Side formed in 2010 and have released several EPs, a full-length album, a compilation album, and a number of assorted cover songs and singles.

The band originated from the small town of Cullman, Alabama.

Their 2017 EP, One spurred three radio singles: "Rebel", "Renegade" (a Styx cover) and "Can You Hear Me" that began to get them noticed and earned them the title of Loudwire's 'Best New Artist of the Year'.

In 2019, the band released their first full-length album Saints & Sinners which contained their most streamed-song to date, "Sound The Alarm". The album was produced by Michael Baskette. Like many bands, the Covid virus and shutdown halted much of the promotion and touring of the album.

2024 has brought the band's 2nd full-length album Reflections. The band used several producers including Kile Odell, who has worked with Motionless in White, Cane Hill, and Through Fire), and Chris Dawson/James Beattie who has worked with Any Given Sin and Saul.

== Band Members ==
Current members

- Eric Boatright - lead vocals (2010–present)
- Heath Fields - drums, backing vocals (2010–present)
- Codey Red - guitar, backing vocals (2022–present)
- Sam Bower - bass, backing vocals (2020–present)

Former members

- Cody Hampton - bass, backing vocals (2010 - 2017)
- Matthew Daniels - bass, backing vocals (2018 - 2019)
- Justin Smith - electric guitar, backing vocals (2017 - 2018)
- Seth Trimble - guitar, keyboard, backing vocals (2010 - 2022)

== Discography ==
Studio Albums

- Saints & Sinners (2019)
- Reflections (2024)

Extended Plays

- Home Today (2012)
- Stand Up (2014)
- One (2016)

Compilation Albums

- Origins (2018)

=== Singles ===
List of singles, with selected chart positions, showing year released and album name
Title	Year	Peak Chart Positions	Album
Title	Year	US Main. Rock	Album
"From the Bottom"	2012	—	Home Today
"Rebel"	2016	40	One
"Renegade"	2017	—	One
"Can You Hear Me"	2017	34	Origins
"Sound the Alarm"	2019	—	Saints & Sinners
"Revival"	2020	—	Saints & Sinners
"The Worst Kind"	2022	40	Reflections
"You're the Reason"	2023	30	Reflections
"Filters" (feat. Elias Soriano)	2024	26	Reflections
"Saturday Night's Alright for Fighting"	2025	—	Non-album single

=== Music videos ===
Title	Year	Director(s)
"Crutch"	2011	Eric Boatright, Alli Richards & Anthony Mattox
"Try To Fight It"	2012	Adam Shewmaker
"My Addiction"	2014	Adam Shewmaker
"Stand Up"	2016	Unknown
"Rebel"	2016	Jim Foster
"Renegade"	2016	Jim Foster
"Can You Hear Me"	2017	Adam Shewmaker
"Sound The Alarm"	2019	Jim Foster
"Revival"	2020	Jim Foster
"Separate Ways (Worlds Apart)"	2021	Unknown
"The Worst Kind"	2022	J.T. Ibanez
"You're the Reason"	2023	J.T. Ibanez
"Filters"	2024	Jim Foster
"Antilife" (Acoustic Version)	2025	J.T. Ibanez
"Saturday Night's Alright for Fighting"	2025	J.T. Ibanez
"No One Wins"	2026	J.T. Ibanez
"Resurrection"	2026	J.T. Ibanez
