= Saul (band) =

American rock band

- Origin: Sutherland, Iowa, U.S.
- Genres: Hard rock
- Years active: 2007–2024 (hiatus)
- Labels: Independent; Spinefarm
- Members: Blake Bedsaul; Zach Bedsaul
- Past members: Todd Poland; Adam Chilton; Joe Nichol; William McIlravy; Myles Clayborne
- Website: saulofficial.com

Saul is an American hard rock band from Sutherland, Iowa, formed in 2007. It was founded by brothers Blake and Zach Bedsaul who began as a cover band titled "Sequoia". They started Saul in 2007.

== History ==
After many years of playing locally in the American Midwest and nationally in addition to producing EPs Embrace the Rain with drummer, Todd Poland, and The Touching of Parallels with drummer, Adam Chilton, Saul spent most of 2017–2018 focused on producing their fourth EP, Aeons, which debuted in spring 2019. The album's headline track, "Brother", describes the loss of a brother and the emotional rollercoaster that comes with the coping process.

After exposure on the Sirius XM Octane Test Drive in winter 2019, "Brother" became a regular in Octane's rotation. The song was also on Sirius XM Octane's Accelerator show as a recognized up-and-comer. It peaked at number 20 on the Billboard 40.

The band signed to Spinefarm Records. On August 28, 2020, the single "King of Misery" was released to streaming platforms, co-written by David Draiman of Disturbed. The band released their debut album Rise as Equals on October 23, 2020.

== Band members ==
=== Current members ===
- Blake Bedsaul – lead vocals (2007–present), bass (2007–2017)
- Zach Bedsaul – lead guitar, backup vocals (2007–present)

=== Past members ===
- Todd Poland – drums (2009–2012)
- Adam Chilton – drums (2012–2017)
- Joe Nichols – drums (2017–2020)
- William McIlravy – bass, backup vocals (2017–2024)
- Myles Clayborne – drums (2020–2024)

== Discography ==
=== Studio albums ===
- Rise as Equals (2020)
- This Is It...The End of Everything (2023)

=== EPs ===
- Embrace the Rain (2010)
- The Touching of Parallels (2014)
- Aeons (2019)

=== Singles ===
Title	Year	Peak chart positions	Album
Title	Year	US Main.	Album
"Brother"	2019	29	Rise as Equals
"Trial by Fire"	2019	34	Rise as Equals
"King of Misery"	2020	23	Rise as Equals
"A Million Miles"	2023	34	This Is It...The End of Everything
"Wage War"	2024	—	Non-album single

=== Promotional singles ===
Title	Year	Album
"Bolide"	2019	Aeons
"Looking to Fight"	2020	Rise as Equals
"Rise as Equals"	2020	Rise as Equals
"The Toll"	2020	Rise as Equals
"Welcome to the Machine" (Pink Floyd cover)	2020	Rise as Equals
"Don't Close Your Eyes"	2021	Rise as Equals
"Jack & Jill"	2022	This Is It... The End of Everything
"Tooth & Nail"	2023	This Is It... The End of Everything
"Better as a Memory"	2023	This Is It... The End of Everything
"Runaway"	2023	This Is It... The End of Everything
"More of the Same"	2024	This Is It... The End of Everything

=== Music videos ===
List of music videos, showing year released and directors
Title	Year	Director(s)
"Brother"	2019	Chris Dawson
"Trial by Fire"	2019	Tom Flynn
"King of Misery"	2020	Scott Hansen
"Rise as Equals"	2020	Austin Scherzberg
"Looking to Fight"	2021	J.T. Ibanez
"A Million Miles"	2023	J.T. Ibanez
"Tooth & Nail"	2023	J.T. Ibanez
"Better as a Memory"	2023	J.T. Ibanez
"Runaway"	2023	J.T. Ibanez
"More of the Same"	2024	J.T. Ibanez
