= War on coal =

Phrase in American political rhetoric

In the United States, the war on coal is a phrase used by the coal industry and its supporters to describe what they claim was an effort by the Obama administration to impose stringent regulations on coal power in the United States and thereby make such power uneconomical. Proponents of this phrase also often identify the Environmental Protection Agency as one of the chief entities waging this putative war, although Michael Grunwald has claimed that the war on coal, although real, does not primarily happen at the national level but at the state and local level, and that the "boots on the ground" in the war are lawyers from the Sierra Club's Beyond Coal campaign. During Obama's tenure, the Obama administration denied that they were waging a war on coal, noting the possibility of upgrading older power plants with more efficient turbines, and also pointing to the possibility of carbon sequestration techniques.

On March 28, 2017, in announcing an executive order aimed at revoking various rules regarding carbon emissions enacted during the Obama administration, President Donald Trump stated that "Our administration is putting an end to the war on coal."

On October 9, 2017, Trump's Environmental Protection Agency chief, and fossil-fuel lobbyist, Scott Pruitt reiterated "the war against coal is over" while announcing a move to repeal a rule on greenhouse gas emissions.

During Trump's second term, on February 11, 2026, he signed an executive order titled "Strengthening United States National Defense with America's Beautiful Clean Coal Power Generation Fleet," which directed the Secretary of War to procure power from coal-fired generation facilities through long-term Power Purchase Agreements for Department of War installations and mission-critical facilities. The order misleadingly framed coal as essential to national security and grid reliability, citing his national energy emergency declared under Executive Order 14156 and building on earlier second-term executive orders promoting coal production (Executive Order 14261) and electric grid security (Executive Order 14262).
