= Any Given Sin =

American rock band

- Origin: Maryland, U.S.
- Genres: Alternative metal, hard rock, heavy metal
- Years active: 2015-present
- Members: Victor Ritchie; Mike Conner; Rich Stevenson; Mike Showalter

Any Given Sin is an American rock band formed in Maryland, in 2015.

== Discography ==
=== Studio albums ===
- War Within (2023)
- Until We Disappear (2026)

=== Extended plays ===
- Forbidden (2015)

=== Singles ===
Title	Year	Peak chart positions	Album
Title	Year	US Main.	Album
"Dynamite"	2018	—	War Within
"Another Life"	2019	37	War Within
"Insidious"	2020	40	War Within
"The Way I Say Goodbye"	2021	29	War Within
"Nothing for Christmas (Christmas Rocks)"	2021	—	Non-album single
"Still Sinking"	2022	—	War Within
"Calm Before the Storm"	2023	—	War Within
"Dynamite" (2023 Version)	2023	23	Non-album singles
"(I Just) Died in Your Arms" (Cutting Crew cover)	2024	—	Non-album singles
"Rest for the Wicked"	2025	—	Until We Disappear
"Through Hell"	2025	—	Until We Disappear
"Lifeline"	2026	—	Until We Disappear

=== Music videos ===
Year	Title	Album	Director
"Dynamite"	2018	War Within	Unknown
"Another Life"	2019	War Within	Tom Flynn
"Insidious"	2020	War Within	Tom Flynn
"The Way I Say Goodbye"	2021	War Within	Tom Flynn
"Still Sinking"	2022	War Within	Jim Abogast
"Calm Before the Storm"	2023	War Within	Tom Flynn and Mike Watts
"Rest For the Wicked"	2025	Until We Disappear	from live footage broadcast
"Through Hell"	2026	Until We Disappear	Justin M Seaman
"Until We Disappear"	2026	Until We Disappear	Jim Arbogast
