= Black Stone Cherry discography =

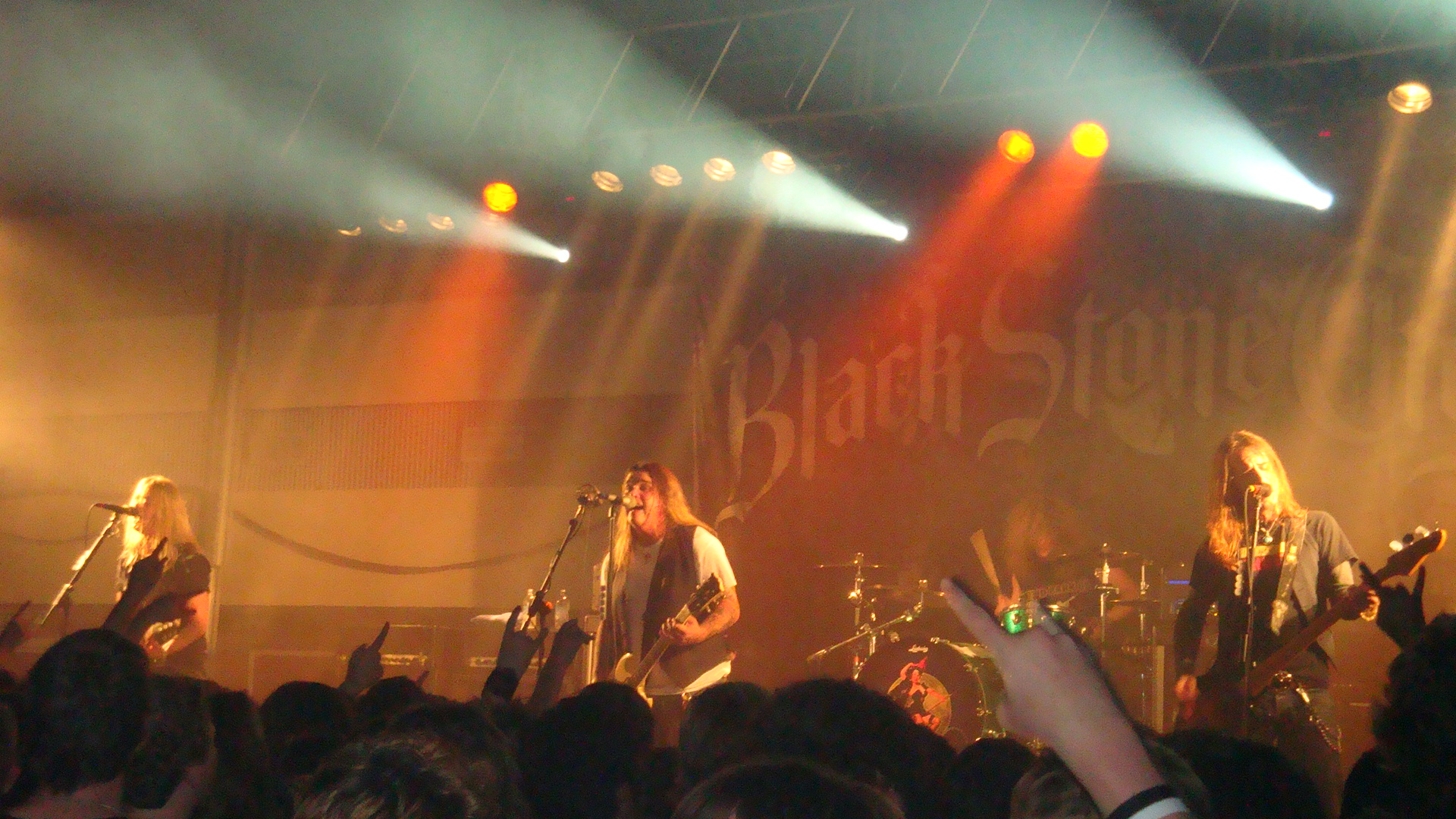
- Black Stone Cherry performing in Portsmouth, England, in October 2009
- Studio albums: 8
- Extended plays: 3
- Live albums: 3
- Compilation albums: 5
- Singles: 39
- Music videos: 32

The discography of American hard rock band Black Stone Cherry consists of 8 studio albums, 2 compilation albums, 3 appearances on compilation albums, 3 live albums, 3 EPs, and 39 singles.

== Studio albums ==
Year	Album details	Peak chart positions										Certifications
Year	Album details	US	US Hard Rock	AUT	FRA	GER	IRL	SWE	SWI	UK	UK Rock	Certifications
2006	Black Stone Cherry: Release: July 18, 2006; Label: Roadrunner; Format: CD, LP, DI	90	—	—	—	—	—	—	—	188	34	BPI: Silver
2008	Folklore and Superstition: Released: August 19, 2008; Label: Roadrunner; Format: CD, LP, DI	28	4	—	167	54	68	45	89	23	1	BPI: Gold
2011	Between the Devil & the Deep Blue Sea: Released: May 31, 2011; Label: Roadrunner; Format: CD, LP, DI	29	2	31	—	22	—	43	31	13	1	BPI: Gold
2014	Magic Mountain: Released: May 6, 2014; Label: Roadrunner; Format: CD, DI	22	1	29	187	31	78	—	28	5	1	
2016	Kentucky: Released: April 1, 2016; Label: Mascot Label Group; Format: CD, LP, DI	40	1	13	100	21	45	—	14	5	1	
2018	Family Tree: Released: April 20, 2018; Label: Mascot Label Group; Format: CD, LP, DI	106	7	19	—	11	—	—	9	7	1	
2020	The Human Condition: Released: October 30, 2020; Label: Mascot Label Group; Format: CD, LP, DI	— (Note: 'The Human Condition' did not enter Billboard's Billboard 200 Chart, but peaked at number 45 on the Top Album Sales Chart.)	—	64	—	33	—	—	71	11	1	
2023	Screamin' at the Sky: Released: September 29, 2023; Label: Mascot Label Group; Format: CD, LP, DI	—	—	—	—	32	—	—	14	6	2	

== Live albums ==
- Live at the Astoria, London (31.10.07) (2007); (Limited to 1000 copies)
- Black Stone Cherry Thank You: Livin' live, Birmingham UK October 30, 2014 – Live (2015)
- Black Stone Cherry - Live From The Royal Albert Hall... Y'All! CD + Blu-ray (2022)

== Extended plays ==
- Black to Blues (2017) – Vinyl/CD Release – September 29, 2017
- Black to Blues, Vol. 2 (2019) – Vinyl/CD Release – October 18, 2019
- Celebrate (2026) – Vinyl/CD Release – March 6, 2026

== Compilations ==
1. "Roadrunner Records: Annual Assault" (2008)
2. "Roadrunner Records: Between a Rock and a Hard Place" (2008)
3. "Roadrunner Records: Hard Rock Christmas" (2010)
4. "Classic Rock magazine special: Hits, Rarities And Live" (2014)
5. "This is Black Stone Cherry's RSD album. The band really likes it." (2025)

== Singles ==
Title	Year	Peak chart positions		Album
Title	Year	US Main.	US Rock	Album
"Lonely Train"	2006	14	×	Black Stone Cherry
"Hell and High Water"	2006	30	×	Black Stone Cherry
"Rain Wizard"	2007	29	×	Black Stone Cherry
"Big City Lights"	2007	—	×	Hell and High Water EP
"Blind Man"	2008	19	×	Folklore and Superstition
"Please Come In"	2008	24	×	Folklore and Superstition
"Things My Father Said"	2009	—	×	Folklore and Superstition
"Soulcreek"	2009	—	×	Folklore and Superstition
"White Trash Millionaire"	2011	11	49	Between the Devil and the Deep Blue Sea
"Blame It on the Boom Boom"	2011	24	—	Between the Devil and the Deep Blue Sea
"In My Blood"	2011	10	29	Between the Devil and the Deep Blue Sea
"Like I Roll"	2012	22	29	Between the Devil and the Deep Blue Sea
"Me and Mary Jane"	2014	16	—	Magic Mountain
"Fiesta Del Fuego"	2014	—	—	Magic Mountain
"Remember Me"	2014	36	—	Magic Mountain
"The Way of the Future"	2015	—	—	Kentucky
"In Our Dreams"	2016	26	—	Kentucky
"The Rambler"	2016	—	—	Kentucky
"Soul Machine"	2016	37	—	Kentucky
"Blue Christmas"	2016	—	—	Non-album single
"Cheaper to Drink Alone"	2017	27	—	Kentucky
"Burnin'"	2018	—	—	Family Tree
"Bad Habit"	2018	38	—	Family Tree
"Be Cowboy" (PBR Theme)	2019	—	—	Non-album single
"Again"	2020	17	—	The Human Condition
"Give Me One Reason"	2021	25	—	The Human Condition (Deluxe Edition)
"Ringin' In My Head"	2022	30	—	The Human Condition
"Out of Pocket" (original or feat. Jesse Leach)	2023	32	—	Screamin' at the Sky
"Nervous"	2023	21	—	Screamin' at the Sky
"What's Love Got To Do With It"	2023	—	—	This is Black Stone Cherry's RSD album. The band really likes it.
"Screamin' at the Sky"	2023	—	—	Screamin' at the Sky
"Smile, World"	2023	—	—	Screamin' at the Sky
"When the Pain Comes"	2024	16	—	Screamin' at the Sky
"American Horse" (feat. John Cooper and Ayron Jones)	2024	—	—	This is Black Stone Cherry's RSD album. The band really likes it.
"Have You Ever Been Lonely?"	2025	—	—	This is Black Stone Cherry's RSD album. The band really likes it.
"Neon Eyes"	2025	—	—	Celebrate
"Celebrate"	2025	25	—	Celebrate
"Don't You (Forget About Me)" (feat. Tyler Connolly)	2026	—	—	Celebrate
"Deep"	2026	17	—	Celebrate
"—" denotes a release that did not chart or was not issued in that region. "×" denotes periods where charts did not exist or were not archived.

== Music videos ==
Year	Title	Album	Director(s)
2006	"Lonely Train"	Black Stone Cherry	Hobos with Guns
2006	"Hell and High Water"	Black Stone Cherry	JB Carlin
2008	"Blind Man"	Folklore and Superstition	'David Sutton
2008	"Please Come In"	Folklore and Superstition	Adam Grabarnick
2009	"Things My Father Said"	Folklore and Superstition	Andrew Bennett
2009	"Soulcreek"	Folklore and Superstition	Joe McKinney
2011	"White Trash Millionaire"	Between the Devil and the Deep Blue Sea	David Sutton
2011	"Blame It on the Boom Boom"	Between the Devil and the Deep Blue Sea	Patrick Kendall
2011	"In My Blood"	Between the Devil and the Deep Blue Sea	Andrew Bennett
2012	"Like I Roll"	Between the Devil and the Deep Blue Sea	Steve Glashier
2014	"Me and Mary Jane"	Magic Mountain	Mason Dixon
2014	"Remember Me"	Magic Mountain	Mason Dixon
2016	"In Our Dreams"	Kentucky	Kyle Cogan
2016	"The Rambler"	Kentucky	Blake Judd
2017	"Cheaper to Drink Alone"	Kentucky	Blake Judd
2018	"Bad Habit"	Family Tree	Blake Judd
2018	"Carry Me On Down the Road"	Family Tree	Mike Rodway
2019	"My Last Breath"	Family Tree	Mike Rodway
2019	"Me and the Devil Blues"	Black To Blues Vol. 2	Mike Rodway
2019	"All Your Love"	Black To Blues Vol. 2	Mike Rodway
2020	"Again"	The Human Condition	Unknown
2020	"In Love with the Pain"	The Human Condition	Mike Rodway
2021	"The Chain"	The Human Condition	Unknown
2021	"Give Me One Reason"	Non-album single	Mike Rodway
2022	"Ringin' in My Head"	The Human Condition	Tom Flynn and Mike Watts
2023	"Out Of Pocket"	Screamin' at the Sky	Mike Rodway
2023	"Nervous"	Screamin' at the Sky	Kyle Loftus
2023	"When the Pain Comes"	Screamin' at the Sky	Kyle Loftus
2024	"Out of Pocket" (feat. Jesse Leach)	Screamin' at the Sky	Mike Rodway
2025	"Neon Eyes"	Celebrate	Unknown
2025	"Celebrate"	Celebrate	Kyle Loftus
2026	"Deep"	Celebrate	Unknown
