= London Astoria =

Former music venue in London, England

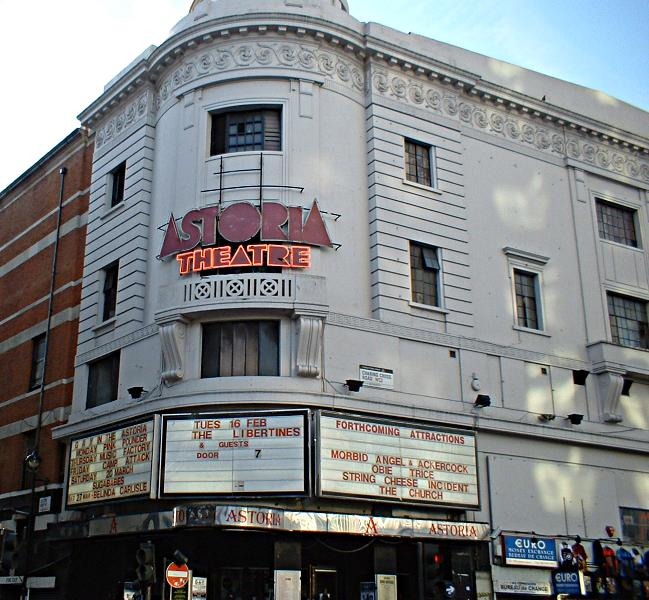
- The front of the Astoria in 2004, five years before its demolition
- Interactive map of London Astoria
- Location: Charing Cross Road, Soho; London, WC2; United Kingdom
- Coordinates: 51°30′57″N 0°7′50″W
- Owner: Festival Republic
- Capacity: 1,600 – 2,000
- Public transit: Tottenham Court Road

Construction
- Opened: 1976
- Closed: 15 January 2009

Website
- festivalrepublic.com (archived)

The London Astoria was a music venue at 157 Charing Cross Road, in London, England, that operated from 1976 to 2009.

Originally a warehouse during the 1920s, the building became a cinema and ballroom. It was converted for use as a theatre in the 1970s. After further development, the building re-opened in the mid-1980s, as a night club and live music venue for well-known musical acts. There are half a dozen clubs and smaller music venues in the adjacent buildings.

In 2009 the venue closed, and was demolished as part of the development plans of the Crossrail project. The venue is still seen today as having been an iconic music establishment, as it helped to launch the careers of many British rock bands and also played a part in the UK success of many international acts.

== History ==
The Astoria was built on the site of a former Crosse & Blackwell warehouse and opened in 1927 as a cinema. It was designed by Edward A. Stone, who also designed subsequent Astoria venues at Brixton (now the Brixton Academy), Old Kent Road, Finsbury Park and Streatham. When first constructed, the building was four storeys tall with a decorative frieze cornice surrounding its exterior. The original interior was styled as a square proscenium theatre consisting of a panelled barrel-vault ceiling supported by large columns, a viewing balcony and had false viewing boxes, which actually contained the organ pipes. From 1928, the basement was used as a ballroom dancing salon.

The venue's interior was re-designed with a plainer, modern style in 1968. In 1977 it was converted for theatrical use. The venue went through another period of conversion when the theatre closed in 1984. It reopened in 1985 as a nightclub and live music venue with a capacity for 2,000 people. A booklet was published called The History of the Astoria by Nigel Crewe to commemorate its evolving uses.

At its closing in 2009 the record for the most consecutive sold-out shows at the Astoria was The Mission who performed seven straight nights between 21 and 27 March 1988 on their "Children Play" tour.

The venue would host the famous night "The Trip" at the height of the acid house scene in 1988.

Mean Fiddler acquired the lease for the London Astoria in May 2000. It was also connected to Astoria 2 so that the two venues could function as a single venue when needed. The Astoria continued to operate in this format until its ultimate closure in 2009.

== Recordings ==
- Generation X reformed for a one-off concert performed at the venue on 20 September 1993, that was filmed by Chrysalis Records.
- Amy Winehouse recorded a whole concert on 19 February 2007, during her Back To Black Tour.
- Radiohead recorded a concert and released it in March 1995 as Live at the Astoria.
- Jamiroquai recorded a whole concert on 1 March 1994, during The Return of the Space Cowboy Tour. This can be found under the title Jamiroquai Live at Astoria Theatre.
- The Smashing Pumpkins recorded and filmed the live performances of their songs "Soma" and "Silverfuck" in February 1994. These videos and recordings appears on Vieuphoria DVD and the Earphoria CD.
- Tool (band) had their now infamous 1997 concert recorded where singer Maynard James Keenan took down a stage-invading fan mid-song, with a judo hip throw before grappling the man to the ground and holding him in a rear naked choke whilst singing the remainder of the song without interruption.
- The Cranberries recorded a concert on 14 January 1994 and they later released it on DVD in 2005.
- Manic Street Preachers played 3 nights at the Astoria during their 1994 tour in support of their 3rd studio album, The Holy Bible. Their final show at the venue, which was on 21 December 1994, ended with the band destroying their equipment and damaging the lighting system, prompted by Richey Edwards' violent destruction of his guitar during the show’s closer, “You Love Us”. This show was also notable for being Edwards' final live appearance before his disappearance in 1995.
- The Groundhogs recorded their Live At The Astoria album at the venue in 1999.
- Feeder recorded a matinee show with a live audience in 1999 at the venue to be shown on Fuji TV, a Japanese television station. ITV2 later showed the performance in the United Kingdom in the year 2000. They also returned on 18 November 2008 playing their last ever show as an Echo Label artist, alongside being their last performance at the venue. They played at the venue in 1998, 1999, 2000, 2001 and 2008. Frontman Grant Nicholas has often cited the venue as providing an important stepping stone in their career.
- Okean Elzy's videoclip "Toi den'" was filmed at the Astoria in February 2000.
- The video for Silver Ginger 5's "Sonic Shake" was filmed at the Astoria in December 2000.
- Sum 41 recorded a whole live concert on the DVD Introduction to Destruction in 2001.
- Steve Marriott Memorial CD and DVD was recorded in 2001 featuring Paul Weller and Noel Gallagher.
- The live portion of the video for The Wildhearts' "Stormy In The North, Karma In The South" was filmed at the Astoria in 2002.
- New Model Army recorded their DVD Live 161203 in 2003.
- The Darkness were filmed for a Channel 4 documentary called Carling Homecoming where they played the venue, after being signed. They had previously been one of the first bands to sell out the Astoria without being on a major label, a turning point in the band's career to reaching stardom.
- Coheed & Cambria played their only Neverender special of 2008 outside of the United States at the Astoria.
- Metallica played a secret gig in 1995 at Astoria 2. There was a limited CD release to fans.
- Uriah Heep recorded their Magic Night CD/DVD at the Astoria on 8 November 2003.
- Twisted Sister recorded a Live at the Astoria DVD in 2004, which was released in 2008.
- Marillion recorded their live DVD Marbles on the Road at two sold-out shows at the Astoria in July 2004.
- Dio recorded their Holy Diver – Live album at the Astoria in 2005.
- Black Label Society recorded part of their live DVD The European Invasion - Doom Troopin' Live at the Astoria in June 2005.
- Hard-Fi's DVD In Operation is a full live performance at one of their sold-out shows at the Astoria during their December 2005 tour. It reached No. 62 in the UK Album Chart as it was bundled with a remix CD, thus making it eligible.
- InMe recorded their 2006 live album and DVD Caught: White Butterfly at the Astoria in December 2005.
- Deep Purple started their Rapture of the Deep tour at the Astoria on 17 January 2006.
- Eels recorded their album Live and in Person! London 2006 at the Astoria in 2006.
- Steve Vai over two nights on 6th and 7th December 2001, recorded and released a live DVD called Live at the Astoria.
- Diamond Head recorded a DVD and live CD To the Devil His Due, released by Secret Records Ltd in 2006.
- Stop The War Live DVD was recorded here featuring Mick Jones, Brian Eno and Rachid Taha.
- Arctic Monkeys recorded a concert on Friday, 13 April 2007, which was broadcast on BBC Radio 1 the Monday after.
- Tangerine Dream recorded a whole concert on 20 April 2007 and released the DVD London Astoria Club Concert 2007. A previous concert was also recorded here on 15 February 2003 and released as Tangerine Tree Volumes 32 and 33. Tangerine Tree is a non-profit fan-based project which features many audience-recorded concerts by Tangerine Dream spanning their entire career.
- Girls Aloud released a recording of their performance of "Long Hot Summer" at G-A-Y at the Astoria in 2006 as a UK iTunes exclusive download.
- Ladytron recorded their album Live at London Astoria 16.07.08 at the Astoria in 2008.
- Nirvana used two songs from the recordings made by Craig Montgomery from their 3 December 1989 show on the live compilation album From the Muddy Banks of the Wishkah released on 1 October 1996. They are the only recordings on the album to feature drummer Chad Channing.
- Less Than Jake recorded their album Live from Astoria on the third night of a three-day run at the venue in April 2001. It was released on 29 April 2016 via Rude Records and Saint November Records (for the UK vinyl).
- Black Stone Cherry recorded the live album Live At The Astoria, London (31 October 2007) at the Astoria in 2007.
- They Might Be Giants recorded the song "London" in 2004 for their Venue Songs project, in which they would write and perform a song about every venue they visited on their tour.
- Slipknot played the song Iowa for the first time at Astoria in 2004
- Muse recorded a concert on 31 January 2000, with the songs "Agitated", "Sunburn", "Plug In Baby" and "Showbiz" being released years later on the band's Origin of Muse boxset.
- Mostly Autumn recorded their live album Storms over London Town, recorded 4th June 2005 and released 2006.
- System of a Down recorded a live performance on 4th April 2005 which broadcast on MTV2 titled Live At The Astoria.
- Deftones played a legendary show at the astoria on january 20th 1998 with explosive raw energy including a famous cover of Weezer's "Tired of Sex"

== Closure and redevelopment of site ==
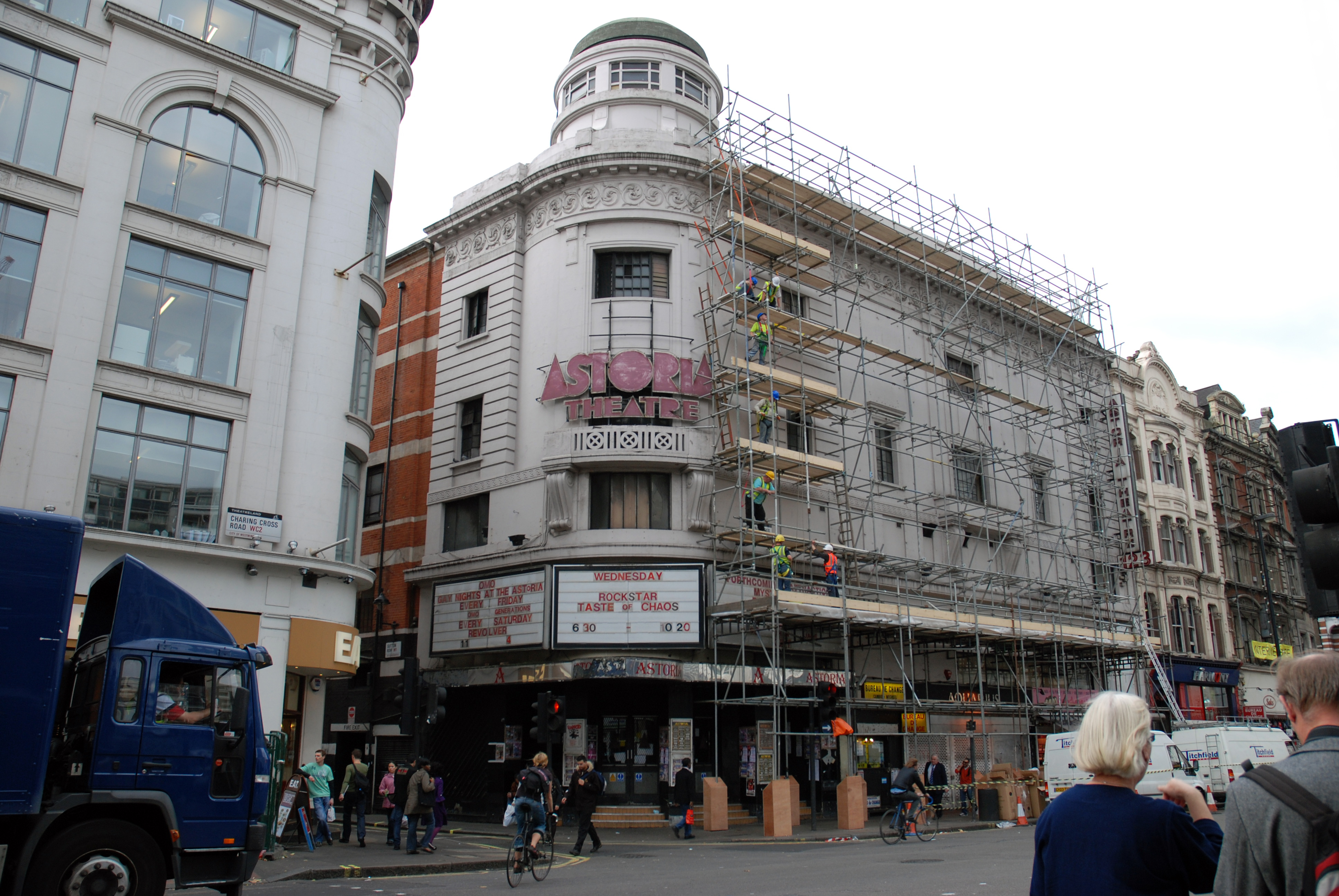
Workmen preparing the building for demolition in October 2008

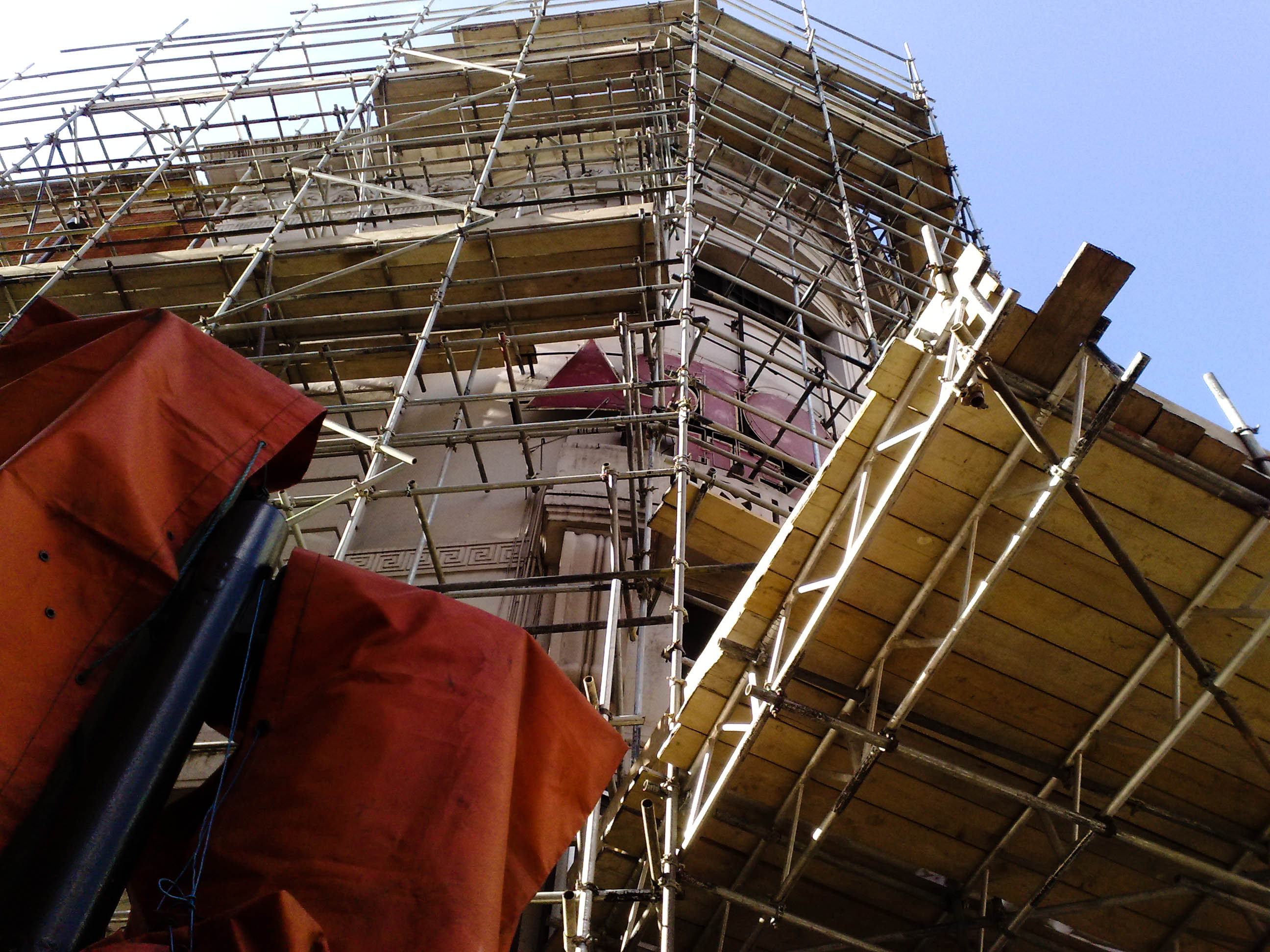
The Astoria with scaffolding prior to demolition

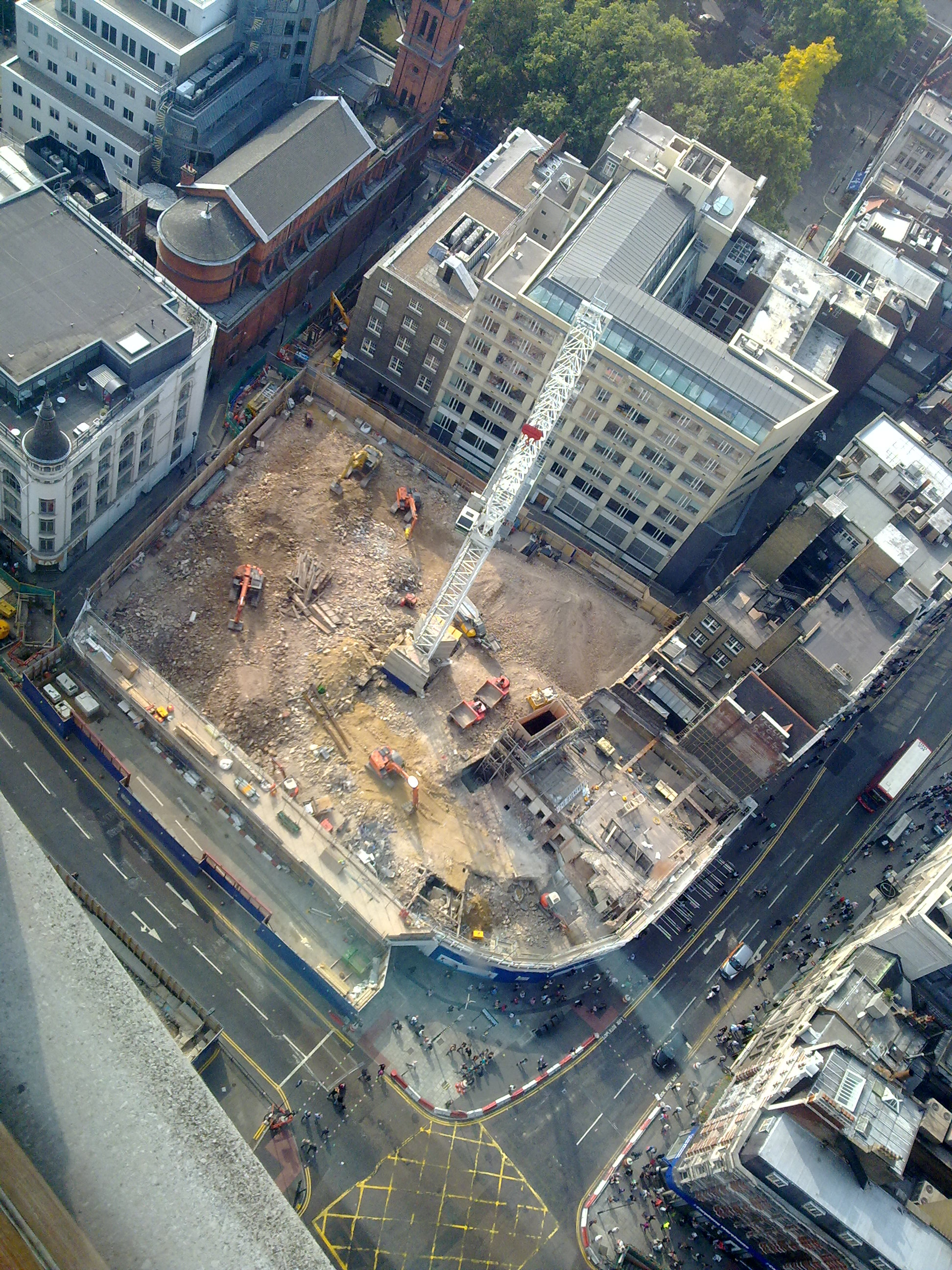
The Tottenham Court Road construction site (2009) on the former site of the Astoria, the green of Soho Square is seen at the top

In June 2006, the Astoria was sold by Compco Holdings to property group Derwent Valley Central, for £23.75m. It was rumoured that the buyers were planning to convert the site into a combination of shops, flats and offices to take advantage of an increase in property prices due to the forthcoming 2012 Olympics.

On 13 August 2007, Festival Republic sold most of its venues, and the rights to the name Mean Fiddler, to the MAMA Group, but it retained The Astoria and Mean Fiddler, which reverted to its old name of The Astoria 2, generally known as the LA2 (London Astoria 2).

In 2008 it became known that the Astoria would be demolished to make way for Crossrail, a major railway development crossing London from west to east. Despite public opposition, London Mayor Ken Livingstone confirmed that the venue would have to go, saying "The construction of Crossrail means that the Astoria can't be saved".

The nightclub G-A-Y left the Astoria in July 2008 and moved to the Heaven nightclub.

In January 2009, the Astoria closed its doors for the last time, having been subject to a compulsory purchase order for the Crossrail development. Its final night of opening was 14 January, when a 'Demolition Ball' was held, co-organised by Get Cape Wear Cape Fly's Sam Duckworth in aid of Billy Bragg's Jail Guitar Doors charity and Love Music Hate Racism. Acts included The Automatic, My Vitriol and ex-Mansun singer Paul Draper, Frank Turner, ...And You Will Know Us By The Trail Of Dead and The King Blues. London Astoria 2 also had a closing party, headlined by rock band Open The Skies, with support from Outcry Fire, F.A.T.E and Orakai.

Demolition of the Astoria was completed by October 2009.

In 2012, plans by Nimax Theatres to build a new in-the-round theatre on the site adjacent to the Astoria were approved. The site could not be built on at that time due to the construction of Crossrail. The venue was due to open in November 2021 but its opening was delayed as a result of the COVID-19 pandemic. The new theatre, @sohoplace, the first newly built West End theatre for 50 years, opened in October 2022 and seats 602.
