= Out of pocket =

Out of pocket may refer to:

- Out-of-pocket expenses
- Out of pocket (slang), a 2020s term for something crazy, wild, or extreme
- "Out of Pocket", a 2023 song by Black Stone Cherry from Screamin' at the Sky
- "Out of Pocket", a 2016 song by Mayer Hawthorne from Man About Town
