= Live at the Astoria, London (Black Stone Cherry album) =

Live at the Astoria, London (31.10.07)

Live album by Black Stone Cherry
- Released: October 31, 2007
- Recorded: October 31, 2007
- Genre: Hard rock, Southern rock
- Length: 1:21:45
- Label: Roadrunner
- Producer: Concert Live

Black Stone Cherry chronology
Black Stone Cherry (2007)	Live at the Astoria, London (31.10.07) (2007)	Folklore and Superstition (2008)

Live At The Astoria, London (31.10.07) is the first live album by American rock band Black Stone Cherry. The album was released on October 31, 2007, by Concert Live. It is a two disc set of Black Stone Cherry's show at The Astoria in London, England. This was the last show of Black Stone Cherry's tour.

The track Yeah Man is a Black Stone Cherry original and this is its first release.

== Track listing ==
Disc One

1. Rain Wizard – 3:40
2. Backwoods Gold – 3:24
3. Yeah Man – 3:15
4. Rollin' On – 6:38
5. Violator Girl – 4:13
6. Big City Lights – 5:40
7. Hell and High Water – 4:09
8. Shapes of Things – 3:17
9. Folsom Prison Blues – 6:51

Disc Two

1. Crosstown Woman – 4:35
2. Hoochie Coochie Man – 4:57
3. Drum Solo (In the middle of Hoochie Coochie Man) – 4:54
4. End of Hoochie Coochie Man – 1:46
5. Lonely Train – 5:00
6. Shooting Star – 5:46
7. Maybe Someday – 4:16
8. Guitar Solos – 4:06
9. Voodoo Child (Slight Return) – 5:10

== Personnel ==
- Chris Robertson – lead vocals and lead guitar
- Ben Wells – rhythm guitar and backing vocals
- Jon Lawhon – bass and backing vocals
- John Fred Young – drums and backing vocals
