= Again (Black Stone Cherry song) =

Single by Black Stone Cherry

from the album The Human Condition
- Released: August 6, 2020
- Recorded: 2020
- Genre: Hard rock, alternative rock
- Length: 3:55
- Label: Mascot

Black Stone Cherry singles chronology
"Bad Habit" (2018)	"Again" (2020)	"In Love With the Pain" (2020)

"Again" is a song by American rock band Black Stone Cherry. It was released as the lead single off of their seventh studio album, The Human Condition on Mascot Records on August 6, 2020. It has since become their highest peaking song on the Canada Rock Billboard chart, as well as their first top 20 hit on the Mainstream Rock chart since "Me and Mary Jane" in 2014.

== Background ==
The song was first written during the sessions for 'Folklore and Superstition' in 2008. During the recording of 'The Human Condition,' the band kept the bridge and rewrote the other sections. Lyrically, the band said the song is about "the inner spirit that human beings have to be able to overcome and stand back up."

== Music video ==
The video premiered on Billboard on August 6, 2020, along with the announcement of the album. The band released a live music video for the track on March 18, 2021. It was their first performance together since the start of the COVID-19 induced lockdowns.

== Charts ==
Chart (2021)	Peak position
Canada Rock (Billboard)	33
US Mainstream Rock (Billboard)	17
