= In My Blood =

In My Blood may refer to:

- "In My Blood", a song by Alesso on the 2015 album Forever
- "In My Blood" (Black Stone Cherry song), 2011
- "In My Blood" (Shawn Mendes song), 2018
- "In My Blood" (The Veronicas song), 2016
- "In My Blood", a song by Wage War on the 2024 album Stigma.
- In My Blood (En Mi Sangre), an album by Breed 77
