= Hell and High Water (Black Stone Cherry song) =

Single by Black Stone Cherry

from the album Black Stone Cherry
- Released: November 11, 2006
- Genre: Hard rock
- Label: Roadrunner
- Songwriters: Chris Robertson, Ben Wells, Jon Lawhon, John Fred Young, Richard Oren Young
- Producers: David Barrick, Richard Young

Black Stone Cherry singles chronology
| "Lonely Train" (2006) | "Hell and High Water" (2006) | "Rain Wizard" (2007) |

"Hell and High Water" is the second promo single from Black Stone Cherry's self-titled debut Black Stone Cherry. It follows the first successful single "Lonely Train". This song reached #30 on the Mainstream Rock Tracks chart. It was supported by a video directed by JB Carlin.

"Hell and High Water" is a digital-only three-track EP released on iTunes. It contains two tracks not included on the self-titled album.

== Track listing ==
1. "Hell and High Water" – 4:02
2. "Big City Lights" – 4:23
3. "We Are the Kings" – 3:57
