= The Human Condition (Black Stone Cherry album) =

Studio album by Black Stone Cherry
- Released: October 30, 2020
- Studios: Monocle Studios, Sulphur Well, Kentucky
- Genres: Hard rock, Southern rock
- Length: 46:35
- Label: Mascot
- Producer: Black Stone Cherry

Black Stone Cherry chronology
Family Tree (2018)	The Human Condition (2020)	Screamin' at the Sky (2023)

Singles from The Human Condition
- 1. "Again" Released: August 6, 2020; 2. "Ringin' in My Head" Released: September 17, 2020; 3. "In Love with the Pain" Released: October 22, 2020; 4. "Give Me One Reason" Released: June 28, 2021

Professional ratings
Review scores
Source	Rating
AllMusic	4/5 stars
Kerrang!	4/5

The Human Condition is the seventh studio album by American hard rock band Black Stone Cherry. It was released on October 30, 2020, through Mascot Records, and was their sixth consecutive No. 1 debut on the UK Rock Albums chart. The album's lead single "Again" became their highest charting single on the Canada Rock Chart, as well as their first Top 20 hit on the Mainstream Rock Airplay Chart in the US since "Me and Mary Jane" in 2014. It is the last album to feature founding member and bassist Jon Lawhon, before his departure from the band on June 2, 2021.

On August 27, 2021, the band released a digital deluxe edition of the album, featuring two covers of Tracy Chapman's "Give Me One Reason," as well as live versions of four of the album's original tracks. Their cover has since peaked at No. 25 on the Billboard Mainstream Rock chart.

== Track listing ==
All tracks are written by Black Stone Cherry unless stated otherwise.

The Human Condition track listing
No.	Title	Writer(s)	Length
1.	"Ringin' in My Head"		4:12
2.	"Again"		3:55
3.	"Push Down & Turn"		4:16
4.	"When Angels Learn to Fly"		4:33
5.	"Live This Way"		3:20
6.	"In Love with the Pain"	Scott Lindsey, Stephen Styles, Black Stone Cherry	2:58
7.	"The Chain"		3:27
8.	"Ride"		3:17
9.	"If My Heart Had Wings"		3:15
10.	"Don't Bring Me Down" (Electric Light Orchestra cover)	Jeff Lynne	3:59
11.	"Some Stories"		3:37
12.	"The Devil in Your Eyes"		3:31
13.	"Keep On Keepin' On"	Dave Bassett, Black Stone Cherry	3:15
Total length:			45:35

Deluxe edition bonus tracks
No.	Title	Writer(s)	Length
14.	"Give Me One Reason"	Tracy Chapman	3:35
15.	"Again" (live)		3:56
16.	"Ringin' in My Head" (live)		3:57
17.	"Ride" (live)		3:16
18.	"In Love with the Pain" (live for SiriusXM)	Scott Lindsey, Stephen Styles, Black Stone Cherry	2:56
19.	"Give Me One Reason" (The Plug)	Tracy Chapman	3:46
Total length:			67:01

== Charts ==
Chart performance for The Human Condition
Chart (2020)	Peak position
Austrian Albums (Ö3 Austria)	64
Belgian Albums (Ultratop Wallonia)	75
German Albums (Offizielle Top 100)	33
Dutch Albums (Album Top 100)	71
Scottish Albums (Official Charts)	7
Swiss Albums (Schweizer Hitparade)	71
UK Albums (Official Charts)	11
UK Album Downloads (Official Charts)	7
UK Independent Albums (Official Charts)	2
UK Rock & Metal Albums (Official Charts)	1
