= Rain Wizard =

Single by Black Stone Cherry

from the album Black Stone Cherry
- Released: July 10, 2007
- Genre: Hard rock
- Label: Roadrunner
- Songwriters: Chris Robertson, Ben Wells, Jon Lawhon, John Fred Young, Richard Oren Young
- Producer: David Barrick

Black Stone Cherry singles chronology
"Hell and High Water" (2006)	"Rain Wizard" (2007)	"Big City Lights" (2007)

"Rain Wizard" is the third single from Black Stone Cherry's self-titled debut album, Black Stone Cherry. It follows the second successful single, "Hell and High Water". This song reached #29 on the Mainstream Rock Tracks chart. It is about a local legend that talks of a mysterious wiseman who could bring the rain in times of drought.

The song is featured in the video games ATV Offroad Fury Pro and Sleeping Dogs. It was released as EP on iTunes to promote the single, as well as to give fans a "taste" of Black Stone Cherry. It also includes two previously unreleased songs.

== Track listing ==
1. "Rain Wizard" – 3:24
2. "Drinkin' Champagne" – 3:33
3. "Stop Runnin'" – 3:53
