= Lonely Train =

Single by Black Stone Cherry

from the album Black Stone Cherry
- Released: July 18, 2006
- Genre: Heavy metal, Southern rock
- Length: 3:50
- Label: Roadrunner
- Songwriters: Chris Robertson, Ben Wells, Jon Lawhon, John Fred Young, Richard Oren Young
- Producer: David Barrick

Black Stone Cherry singles chronology
"Lonely Train" (2006)	"Hell and High Water" (2006)

"Lonely Train" is the debut single by hard rock band Black Stone Cherry, from their self-titled album, which was released on July 18, 2006. It peaked at #14 on the Billboard Mainstream Rock Tracks chart, and was selected as a free single on iTunes in July 2006.

"It's about friends who've served in the military," noted singer Chris Robertson, "and it's kinda anti-war, although we're very grateful for the men and women who fight for our country."

With a heavy riff, deep growly vocals, and distorted and aggressive heavy metal sound, 'Lonely Train' is atypical of the group's Southern rock-style sound.

== Music video ==
The video's use of black and white evokes a dark, gloomy feeling. In it, the band play in a warehouse in post-Hurricane Katrina New Orleans, which they considered an appropriate setting for the song's sentiment.

== In pop culture ==
The song was featured in the wrestling game WWE SmackDown vs. Raw 2007.

It was used as the theme song for the 2006 The Great American Bash PPV.
