= Live at London Astoria 16.07.08 =

2009 live album by Ladytron

Live album by Ladytron
- Released: 2009
- Recorded: 16 July 2008 – London
- Venues: Astoria (London, England)
- Genres: Electronic; synthpop; new wave
- Length: 79:43
- Label: Self released
- Producer: Ladytron

Ladytron chronology
Velocifero (2008)	Live at London Astoria 16.07.08 (2009)	Best of 00–10 (2011)

Live at London Astoria 16.07.08 is the first official Ladytron live album recorded during their Velocifero tour and released in 2009.

Ladytron's show at Astoria on 15 May 2008 was cancelled because of a power failure on the stage. Live at London Astoria 16.07.08 is the recording of the rescheduled show from 16 July 2008.

Originally pressed as a one-time 1000 copy run in a simple cardboard slipcase for sales off the stage, the band later released this album on digipack format. Live at London Astoria 16.07.08 was recorded by Harm Schopman and James Gebhard and it was mixed by Daniel Woodwood at Whitewood Studios.

== Track listing ==
No.	Title	Length
1.	"Black Cat"	5:02
2.	"Runaway"	4:48
3.	"High Rise"	5:12
4.	"Ghosts"	4:15
5.	"Seventeen"	4:48
6.	"I'm Not Scared"	3:52
7.	"True Mathematics"	2:40
8.	"Season of Illusions"	4:06
9.	"Soft Power"	5:21
10.	"Playgirl"	4:00
11.	"International Dateline"	4:32
12.	"Predict the Day"	4:39
13.	"Fighting in Built Up Areas"	4:43
14.	"Discotraxx"	4:06
15.	"The Last One Standing"	3:19
16.	"Applause Break"	1:25
17.	"Kletva"	2:42
18.	"Burning Up"	4:24
19.	"Destroy Everything You Touch"	5:40
