= Blame It on the Boom Boom =

Single by Black Stone Cherry

from the album Between the Devil and the Deep Blue Sea
- Released: July 2011
- Recorded: 2011
- Genre: Hard rock Southern rock
- Length: 3:11
- Label: Roadrunner
- Songwriter(s): Chris Robertson, Ben Wells, Jon Lawhon, John Fred Young
- Producer(s): Howard Benson

Black Stone Cherry singles chronology
"White Trash Millionaire" (2011)	"Blame It on the Boom Boom" (2011)	"In My Blood" (2011)

"Blame It on the Boom Boom" is the second single from American hard rock band Black Stone Cherry's third studio album, Between the Devil and the Deep Blue Sea. It was released to radio in July 2011. The song featured in the 2011 film Abduction.

"This song never climbed the charts," noted singer Chris Robertson. "It was never a massive song. People post on our Facebook page, 'Please don't write another Blame It on the Boom Boom.' But every night, it's one of the crowd's favourites. Literally everybody at the show sings that chorus." What's the 'boom boom'? "It can be a variety of things, from something bad hangin' over you to a one-night stand."

== Music video ==
The music video features footage from their appearance at the 2011 Download Festival at England's Castle Donington.

== Charts ==
Chart (2011)	Peak position
US Mainstream Rock (Billboard)	24
