= Rains (band) =

American rock band

- Origin: Fort Wayne, Indiana, United States
- Genres: Post-grunge, hard rock
- Years active: 2000-present
- Members: Jeff Rains
- Past members: Joe Schultz; Jason Anderson; Zach Ruetz; Allen Whitt; Joe Pitter
- Website: www.rainsmusic.com

Rains is an American rock band from Fort Wayne, Indiana. Formed in 2000, the band was named after founder and leader Jeff Rains, whose real name is Jeff Schultz. The band has released two studio albums and one EP as of 2019.

== History ==
Hailing from a small town in northern Indiana (U.S.A.), RAINS features Jeff Schultz. Past members include Joe Schultz on drums, Matt Hopkins on bass, and Jason Anderson on guitar.

Stories, the debut album from RAINS, was preceded by the singles, "Liar" and "Look In My Eyes". The first single, "Liar", was a Top 15 hit on SiriusXM Octane, with the follow-up singles “Look In My Eyes” and “Pressure” hitting #3 and #1 on SiriusXM Octane and charted in the top 30 on Active Rock Radio. The album has garnered over 20 million streams on Spotify, as well as millions of streams and views on platforms such as YouTube and iTunes.

After 8 years of constant touring with bands such as Five Finger Death Punch and Black Stone Cherry as well as numerous headlining tours, Rains decided to take some time off to focus on his daughter and his tattoo company, as well as begin the writing process for his new album. In 2018, Schultz's tattoo shop in Fort Wayne, Indiana, was raided for operating without a license. Schultz was also arrested on drug possession charges.

Since starting the project at age 15 Rains has been committed to staying an independent artist throughout his career and has stuck to that philosophy with his latest release N.F.D.M.

Rains began recording his new album N.F.D.M at House Of Blues Studios in Nashville TN in March 2019 and released the first single “Ghost” on December 6, 2019. Rains is a multi-instrumentalist.

== Band members ==
- Jeff Rains

== Discography ==
=== Studio album ===
- Stories (Mar 31, 2009)
- From The Ashes (Jan 14, 2014)
- N.F.D.M (April 19, 2019)

=== Singles ===
- "Liar" (2010)
- "Look In My Eyes" (2011)
- "Pressure" (2012)
- "Better Man" (2014)
- "Ghost" (Dec 6 2019)
- "The Chain (Nov 19 2021)

=== Music video ===
- Look In My Eyes (Nov 5, 2011)
