= Black to Blues =

EP by Black Stone Cherry
- Released: September 29, 2017
- Genre: Hard rock, blues rock
- Label: Mascot

Black Stone Cherry chronology
Kentucky (2016)	Black to Blues (2017)	Family Tree (2018)

Singles from Black Stone Cherry
- 1. "Built for Comfort" Released: July 27, 2017; 2. "Born Under a Bad Sign" Released: September 21, 2017

Black to Blues is the first EP by American band Black Stone Cherry. It was released on September 29, 2017, through Mascot Records.

== Track listing ==
No.	Title	Writer(s)	Length
1.	"Built for Comfort" (Willie Dixon cover)	Willie Dixon	4:24
2.	"Champagne & Reefer" (Muddy Waters cover)	McKinley Morganfield	3:44
3.	"Palace of the King" (Freddie King cover)	Freddie King	2:58
4.	"Hoochie Coochie Man" (Muddy Waters cover)	Willie Dixon	4:13
5.	"Born Under a Bad Sign" (Albert King cover)	Booker T. Jones music, William Bell lyrics	3:14
6.	"I Want to Be Loved" (Muddy Waters cover)	Willie Dixon	2:11

== Charts ==
Chart (2017)	Peak position
Scottish Albums (OCC)	15
Swiss Albums (Schweizer Hitparade)	82
UK Albums (OCC)	29
