= White Trash Millionaire =

Single by Black Stone Cherry

from the album Between the Devil and the Deep Blue Sea
- Released: April 1, 2011
- Recorded: 2011
- Length: 3:20
- Label: Roadrunner
- Songwriters: Chris Robertson, Ben Wells, Jon Lawhon, John Fred Young, Zac Maloy
- Producer: Howard Benson

Black Stone Cherry singles chronology
"Soulcreek" (2009)	"White Trash Millionaire" (2011)	"Blame It on the Boom Boom" (2011)

"White Trash Millionaire" is a song by American hard rock band Black Stone Cherry. It is the first single from their third studio album Between the Devil and the Deep Blue Sea. It was released onto digital media outlets on April 1, 2011.

== Music video ==
The music video was shot in a scrap yard and was done in the style of a low budget commercial featuring Chris Robertson driving a 1977 Pontiac Trans Am, Ben Wells Driving a 1961 Chevrolet Impala, Jon Lawhon driving a 1969 Pontiac Firebird, and John Fred Young driving a 1970 Dodge Challenger and was produced and directed by David Sutton for Frantic Studio.

== Charts ==
Chart (2011)	Peak position
US Mainstream Rock (Billboard)	11
US Rock Songs (Billboard)	29
