= Soulcreek =

Single by Black Stone Cherry

from the album Folklore And Superstition
- Released: September 7, 2009
- Genre: Southern rock
- Label: Roadrunner
- Songwriters: Chris Robertson, Ben Wells, Jon Lawhon, John Fred Young, Richard Oren Young, Bob Marlette
- Producer: Bob Marlette

Black Stone Cherry singles chronology
"Things My Father Said" (2009)	"Soulcreek" (2009)	"White Trash Millionaire" (2011)

"Soulcreek" is a track written by the Kentucky-based Black Stone Cherry and the official fourth single from their 2008 album, Folklore And Superstition. The band was sending Soulcreek to rock radio on September 7.
