= Please Come In =

Single by Black Stone Cherry

from the album Folklore And Superstition
- Released: November 14, 2008
- Genre: Hard rock Southern rock
- Label: Roadrunner
- Songwriter(s): Chris Robertson, Ben Wells, Jon Lawhon, John Fred Young, Bob Marlette, Richard Oren Young
- Producer(s): Bob Marlette

Black Stone Cherry singles chronology
"Blind Man" (2008)	"Please Come In" (2008)	"Things My Father Said" (2009)

Please Come In is the second single by the American southern rock band Black Stone Cherry from their second studio album Folklore And Superstition. The song peaked at #24 on the Mainstream Rock Tracks Billboard chart.

== Music video ==
A Fillmoresque concert poster so enticing that a passerby gets literally drawn into its pseudo-psychedelic artistic work for a mystica, animated adventure. Even though it's clearly the girl depicted in the posted bill and not the band itself that grabs his attention, he does make his way to an actual Black Stone Cherry show where he finally catches up with the babe. The video directed by Adam Grabarnick.

== Personnel ==
- Chris Robertson - lead vocals, rhythm guitar
- Ben Wells - lead guitar, backing vocals
- Jon Lawhon - bass guitar, backing vocals
- John Fred Young - drums, percussion, backing vocals
