= Magic Mountain (Black Stone Cherry album) =

Studio album by Black Stone Cherry
- Released: May 6, 2014
- Recorded: JHOC, Pasadena
- Genre: Hard rock, Southern rock
- Length: 55:05
- Label: Roadrunner
- Producer: Evil Joe Barresi

Black Stone Cherry chronology
Between the Devil and the Deep Blue Sea (2011)	Magic Mountain (2014)	Kentucky (2016)

Singles from Magic Mountain
- 1. "Me and Mary Jane" Released: February 25, 2014; 2. "Remember Me" Released: September 2014

Professional ratings
Aggregate scores
Source	Rating
Metacritic	76/100
Review scores
Source	Rating
Allmusic	3.5/5 stars

Magic Mountain is the fourth studio album by American rock band Black Stone Cherry. The album was released on May 6, 2014. It was the band's last release with Roadrunner Records before their departure from the label and signing with Mascot Records a year later.

== Reception ==
The album holds a Metacritic rating of 76 out of 100 based on four reviews, indicating "generally favorable reviews".

The album debuted at No. 22 on the Billboard 200 chart, selling 13,000 copies in the United States in its first week of release. The album has sold 41,000 copies in the United States as of March 2016. It debuted in the United Kingdom at No. 5.

== Track listing ==
All tracks are written by Black Stone Cherry, except where noted.

No.	Title	Writer(s)	Length
1.	"Holding On... to Letting Go"		4:15
2.	"Peace Pipe"	Black Stone Cherry, Dave Bassett	4:13
3.	"Bad Luck & Hard Love"	Black Stone Cherry, Richard Young	3:49
4.	"Me and Mary Jane"		4:08
5.	"Runaway"		3:53
6.	"Magic Mountain"		3:45
7.	"Never Surrender"		3:29
8.	"Blow My Mind"	Black Stone Cherry, Bassett	3:42
9.	"Sometimes"	Black Stone Cherry, Craig Wiseman	4:34
10.	"Fiesta del fuego"		4:09
11.	"Dance Girl"		4:40
12.	"Hollywood in Kentucky"	Black Stone Cherry, The Warren Brothers	4:29
13.	"Remember Me"		6:03
Total length:			55:05

Best Buy bonus tracks
No.	Title	Length
14.	"Leave Your World Behind"	3:37
15.	"Revolutionize"	4:14

- Mastered by Ted Jensen at Sterling Sound, NYC

== Charts ==
Chart (2014)	Peak position
Austrian Albums (Ö3 Austria)	29
Belgian Albums (Ultratop Wallonia)	159
French Albums (SNEP)	187
German Albums (Offizielle Top 100)	31
Italian Albums (FIMI)	74
Scottish Albums (OCC)	5
Swiss Albums (Schweizer Hitparade)	28
UK Albums (OCC)	5
UK Rock & Metal Albums (OCC)	1
US Billboard 200	22
US Digital Albums (Billboard)	24
US Top Hard Rock Albums (Billboard)	1
US Top Rock Albums (Billboard)	6
