= Between the Devil & the Deep Blue Sea (Black Stone Cherry album) =

Studio album by Black Stone Cherry
- Released: May 31, 2011
- Studio: Bay 7, Los Angeles
- Genre: Hard rock, Southern rock
- Length: 41:53
- Label: Roadrunner
- Producer: Howard Benson

Black Stone Cherry chronology
Folklore and Superstition (2008)	Between the Devil & the Deep Blue Sea (2011)	Magic Mountain (2014)

Singles from Between the Devil and the Deep Blue Sea
- 1. "White Trash Millionaire" Released: March 25, 2011; 2. "Blame It on the Boom Boom" Released: July 2011; 3. "In My Blood" Released: October 28, 2011; 4. "Like I Roll" Released: May 9, 2012

Professional ratings
Review scores
Source	Rating
AllMusic	3/5 stars
Louder	4/5 stars

Between the Devil & the Deep Blue Sea is the third studio album by Black Stone Cherry. Produced by Howard Benson, it was released on May 27, 2011. The song "Stay" was later covered by Florida Georgia Line, who released it as the fourth single from their debut album Here's to the Good Times.

== Commercial performance ==
The album debuted at No. 29 on the Billboard 200, selling 13,000 copies in its first week.

== Track listing ==
Between the Devil & the Deep Blue Sea track listing
No.	Title	Writer(s)	Length
1.	"White Trash Millionaire"	Black Stone Cherry, Zac Maloy	3:20
2.	"Killing Floor"	Black Stone Cherry, John 5, Bob Marlette	4:02
3.	"In My Blood"	Black Stone Cherry, Maloy	3:49
4.	"Such a Shame" (featuring Lzzy Hale)	Black Stone Cherry, Richard Young	3:27
5.	"Won't Let Go" (featuring Lzzy Hale)	Black Stone Cherry, Dave Bassett	3:19
6.	"Blame It on the Boom Boom"	Black Stone Cherry	3:11
7.	"Like I Roll"	Black Stone Cherry, Bassett	3:33
8.	"Can't You See (The Marshall Tucker Band cover song)"	Toy Caldwell	3:33
9.	"Let Me See You Shake"	Black Stone Cherry, Young	3:07
10.	"Stay"	Black Stone Cherry, Joey Moi	3:24
11.	"Change"	Black Stone Cherry, Trey Bruce	3:05
12.	"All I'm Dreamin' Of"	Black Stone Cherry, Moi	3:32

iTunes and UK retail bonus tracks
No.	Title	Length
13.	"Staring at the Mirror"	3:22
14.	"Fade Away" (featuring Lzzy Hale)	3:45
15.	"Die for You"	3:14

Japanese edition bonus track
No.	Title	Length
16.	"Let Me See You Shake" (Demo)	3:14

== Personnel ==
- Chris Robertson – lead vocals, lead guitar
- Ben Wells – rhythm guitar, backing vocals
- Jon Lawhon – bass guitar, backing vocals
- John Fred Young – drums, backing vocals
- Lzzy Hale – guest vocals

== Charts ==
Chart performance for Between the Devil & the Deep Blue Sea
Chart (2011)	Peak position
Austrian Albums (Ö3 Austria)	31
German Albums (Offizielle Top 100)	22
Scottish Albums (OCC)	10
Swedish Albums (Sverigetopplistan)	43
Swiss Albums (Schweizer Hitparade)	31
UK Albums (OCC)	13
UK Album Downloads (OCC)	20
UK Rock & Metal Albums (OCC)	1
US Billboard 200	29
US Top Hard Rock Albums (Billboard)	2
US Top Rock Albums (Billboard)	9

== Certifications ==
Certifications for Between the Devil & the Deep Blue Sea
Region	Certification	Certified units/sales
United Kingdom (BPI)	Gold	100,000^{‡}
^{‡} Sales+streaming figures based on certification alone.
