= In My Blood (Black Stone Cherry song) =

Single by Black Stone Cherry

from the album Between the Devil and the Deep Blue Sea
- Released: October 28, 2011
- Recorded: 2011
- Genre: Hard rock Post-grunge; Southern rock
- Length: 3:49
- Label: Roadrunner
- Songwriters: Chris Robertson, Ben Wells, Jon Lawhon, John Fred Young, Zac Maloy
- Producer: Howard Benson

Black Stone Cherry singles chronology
"Blame It on the Boom Boom" (2011)	"In My Blood" (2011)	"Like I Roll" (2012)

"In My Blood" is the third single from American hard rock band Black Stone Cherry's third studio album Between the Devil and the Deep Blue Sea. It was released to digital media outlets in October 2011.

"That was one of those spur-of-the-moment songs," recalled singer Chris Robertson. "We wrote that entire song on acoustic guitars in fifteen minutes; two days before we started recording Between the Devil and the Deep Blue Sea. It's an honest representation of the feelings we have when we're on the road. Rock 'n' roll is in my blood. I pretty much sucked at everything else, so it's good that music worked out for me."

== Music video ==
The video tells the story of a real U.S. Soldier, PFC Randy Hirneisen. It follows him as he returns from Afghanistan to Germany, and eventually to his home in Augusta, Georgia, where he is reunited with his wife and sees his two-month-old son for the first time.

== Charts ==
=== Weekly charts ===
Weekly chart performance for "In My Blood"
Chart (2012)	Peak position
US Hot Rock & Alternative Songs (Billboard)	29

=== Year-end charts ===
Year-end chart performance for "In My Blood"
Chart (2012)	Position
US Hot Rock Songs (Billboard)	82
