= Kentucky (Black Stone Cherry album) =

Studio album by Black Stone Cherry
- Released: April 1, 2016
- Recorded: Barrick Recording Studio, Glasgow, Kentucky
- Genre: Hard rock, Southern rock
- Length: 52:32
- Label: Mascot
- Producer: Black Stone Cherry

Black Stone Cherry chronology
| Magic Mountain (2014) | Kentucky (2016) | Black to Blues (2017) |

Singles from Kentucky
- 1. "The Way of the Future" Released: December 18, 2015; 2. "In Our Dreams" Released: January 22, 2016; 3. "The Rambler" Released: February 25, 2016; 4. "Soul Machine" Released: August 24, 2016; 5. "Cheaper to Drink Alone" Released: March 14, 2017

Professional ratings
Aggregate scores
| Source | Rating |
|---|---|
| Metacritic | 80/100 |
Review scores
| Source | Rating |
| Allmusic | 4/5 stars |
| Revolver Magazine | 3.5/5 stars |

Kentucky is the fifth studio album by American band Black Stone Cherry. It was released on April 1, 2016, through Mascot Records.

== Track listing ==
All tracks are written by Black Stone Cherry unless stated otherwise.

| No. | Title | Writer(s) | Length |
|---|---|---|---|
| 1. | "The Way of the Future" | | 3:53 |
| 2. | "In Our Dreams" | | 3:49 |
| 3. | "Shakin' My Cage" | | 4:10 |
| 4. | "Soul Machine" | | 4:01 |
| 5. | "Long Ride" | | 4:03 |
| 6. | "War" (Edwin Starr cover) | Norman Whitfield, Barrett Strong | 4:07 |
| 7. | "Hangman" | | 3:57 |
| 8. | "Cheaper to Drink Alone" | | 3:51 |
| 9. | "Rescue Me" | | 3:47 |
| 10. | "Feelin' Fuzzy" | | 3:15 |
| 11. | "Darkest Secret" | | 4:01 |
| 12. | "Born to Die" | | 4:33 |
| 13. | "The Rambler" | | 5:09 |
| Total length: | | | 52:32 |

iTunes Deluxe Edition
| No. | Title | Length |
|---|---|---|
| 14. | "I Am the Lion" | 3:35 |
| 15. | "Evil" (Cactus cover) | 4:11 |

Exclusive Edition bonus tracks
| No. | Title | Writer(s) | Length |
|---|---|---|---|
| 14. | "Love Runs Out" (OneRepublic cover) | Ryan Tedder, Brent Kutzle, Drew Brown, Zach Filkins, Eddie Fisher | 4:15 |
| 15. | "Coyote" | | 4:43 |
| 16. | "Mississippi Queen" (Mountain cover) | Corky Laing, Felix Pappalardi, David Rea, Leslie West | 3:21 |

- Mastered by Ted Jensen at Sterling Sound, NYC

== Charts ==
| Chart (2016) | Peak position |
|---|---|
| Austrian Albums (Ö3 Austria) | 13 |
| Belgian Albums (Ultratop Flanders) | 81 |
| Belgian Albums (Ultratop Wallonia) | 82 |
| French Albums (SNEP) | 100 |
| German Albums (Offizielle Top 100) | 21 |
| Dutch Albums (Album Top 100) | 92 |
| Italian Albums (FIMI) | 97 |
| Scottish Albums (OCC) | 3 |
| Swiss Albums (Schweizer Hitparade) | 14 |
| UK Albums (OCC) | 5 |
| UK Independent Albums (OCC) | 4 |
| UK Rock & Metal Albums (OCC) | 1 |
| US Billboard 200 | 40 |
| US Digital Albums (Billboard) | 18 |
| US Top Hard Rock Albums (Billboard) | 1 |
| US Independent Albums (Billboard) | 3 |
| US Top Rock Albums (Billboard) | 5 |
