= Black Stone Cherry (album) =

Studio album by Black Stone Cherry
- Released: July 18, 2006
- Recorded: 2006
- Genre: Hard rock, Southern rock
- Length: 46:23
- Label: Roadrunner
- Producer: David Barrick, Richard Young

Black Stone Cherry chronology
Black Stone Cherry (2006)	Folklore and Superstition (2008)

Singles from Black Stone Cherry
- 1. "Lonely Train" Released: July 18, 2006; 2. "Hell and High Water" Released: November 11, 2006; 3. "Rain Wizard" Released: July 10, 2007

Professional ratings
Review scores
Source	Rating
AllMusic	3.5/5 stars
Hit Parader	3/5 stars
IGN	(7.7/10)

Black Stone Cherry is the debut album by American hard rock band Black Stone Cherry. It was released on July 18, 2006, through Roadrunner Records. The album has produced three singles: "Lonely Train", "Hell and High Water" and "Rain Wizard".

As of 2008, the album had sold around 110,000 copies.

== Track listing ==
All tracks are written by Black Stone Cherry, unless stated otherwise.

No.	Title	Writer(s)	Length
1.	"Rain Wizard"		3:24
2.	"Backwoods Gold"		3:06
3.	"Lonely Train"		3:50
4.	"Maybe Someday"		3:47
5.	"When the Weight Comes Down"		3:35
6.	"Crosstown Woman"		3:36
7.	"Shooting Star"		3:12
8.	"Hell and High Water"		4:01
9.	"Shapes of Things" (The Yardbirds cover)	Paul Samwell-Smith, Keith Relf, Jim McCarty	3:05
10.	"Violator Girl"		3:23
11.	"Tired of the Rain"		3:15
12.	"Drive"		3:04
13.	"Rollin' On"		4:59

== Credits ==
- Chris Robertson – lead vocals, lead guitar
- Ben Wells – rhythm guitar, backing vocals
- Jon Lawhon – bass, backing vocals
- John Fred Young – drums, backing vocals
- Reese Wynans – B3 organ on "Rollin' On" and "Tired of the Rain"

== In pop culture ==
The track "Lonely Train" was the official theme song for WWE's The Great American Bash (2006). It was later featured in the wrestling video game WWE Smackdown vs. Raw 2007.
