= Screamin' at the Sky =

Studio album by Black Stone Cherry
- Released: September 29, 2023
- Length: 39:51
- Label: Mascot
- Producer: Black Stone Cherry

Black Stone Cherry chronology
The Human Condition (2020)	Screamin' at the Sky (2023)

Singles from Screamin' at the Sky
- 1. "Out of Pocket" Released: January 12, 2023; 2. "Nervous" Released: May 10, 2023; 3. "Screamin' at the Sky" Released: July 6, 2023; 4. "When the Pain Comes" Released: September 28, 2023

Screamin' at the Sky is the eighth studio album by the American hard rock band Black Stone Cherry. It was released on September 29, 2023, through Mascot Records. It was preceded by the singles "Out of Pocket", "Nervous", "Screamin' at the Sky" and "When the Pain Comes". From September 27 through October 5, the album was also available for purchase in digital as a special limited edition, including the exclusive bonus track "Love Someone" and covers of Elvis Presley's "Burnin' Love" and "Jumpin' Jack Flash" by The Rolling Stones.

== Critical reception ==
Professional ratings
Review scores
Source	Rating
Classic Rock	4/5 stars
Kerrang!	4/5

Steve Beebee of Kerrang! wrote that the album "recalls the grungy heft of their classic 2006 debut while simultaneously sounding like something utterly of its own time", concluding that it "hits as hard as anything they've ever done". John Aizlewood of Classic Rock felt that the band's "formula remains reassuringly simple: songs that pack a ferocious punch; guitar fireworks that crash and burn; Chris Robertson's grizzled, last-man-standing vocals; and an admirable refusal to lighten the load with anything as compromising as a ballad".

== Track listing ==
All tracks are written by Black Stone Cherry.

Screamin' at the Sky track listing
No.	Title	Length
1.	"Screamin' at the Sky"	3:24
2.	"Nervous"	3:15
3.	"When the Pain Comes"	3:24
4.	"Out of Pocket"	3:07
5.	"Show Me What It Feels Like"	3:20
6.	"R.O.A.R."	3:13
7.	"Smile, World"	2:57
8.	"The Mess You Made"	2:57
9.	"Who Are You Today?"	3:44
10.	"Not Afraid"	3:12
11.	"Here's to the Hopeless"	3:34
12.	"You Can Have It All"	3:44
Total length:		39:51

== Personnel ==
Credits are adapted from the album's liner notes.

=== Black Stone Cherry ===
- John Fred Young – drums, vocals, production, art direction
- Ben Wells – guitar, vocals, percussion, production, art direction
- Steve Jewell Jr. – bass, vocals, slide guitar, production, art direction
- Chris Robertson – lead vocals, guitar, production, art direction

=== Additional contributors ===
- Jordan Westfall – executive production, engineering, mixing
- Ted Jensen – mastering
- Jonathan Taylor – guitar technician
- Jeff Boggs – drum technician
- Marc Owens – drum technician
- Sam Mayle – cover design
- Roy Koch – art layout
- Jimmy Fontaine – photography

== Charts ==
Chart performance for Screamin' at the Sky
Chart (2023)	Peak position
German Albums (Offizielle Top 100)	32
Scottish Albums (Official Charts)	3
Swiss Albums (Schweizer Hitparade)	14
UK Albums (Official Charts)	6
UK Independent Albums (Official Charts)	3
UK Rock & Metal Albums (Official Charts)	2
