= Family Tree (Black Stone Cherry album) =

Studio album by Black Stone Cherry
- Released: April 20, 2018
- Recorded: Barrick Recording Studio, Glasgow, Kentucky
- Genre: Hard rock, Southern rock
- Length: 53:02
- Label: Mascot
- Producer: Black Stone Cherry

Black Stone Cherry chronology
Black to Blues (2017)	Family Tree (2018)	Black to Blues 2 (2019)

Singles from Family Tree
- 1. "Burnin'" Released: February 8, 2018; 2. "Bad Habit" Released: March 8, 2018; 3. "Southern Fried Friday Night" Released: April 13, 2018

Family Tree is the sixth studio album by American rock band Black Stone Cherry. It was released on April 20, 2018, through Mascot Records. The first two singles, "Burnin'" and "Bad Habit", were released on February 8, and March 8, 2018, respectively, with the audio for the latter being released on YouTube on March 9 and the music video on April 6.

== Track listing ==
All tracks are written by Black Stone Cherry unless stated otherwise.

No.	Title	Length
1.	"Bad Habit"	3:15
2.	"Burnin'"	3:28
3.	"New Kinda Feelin'"	3:54
4.	"Carry Me On Down the Road"	4:34
5.	"My Last Breath"	4:18
6.	"Southern Fried Friday Night"	3:26
7.	"Dancin' in the Rain" (featuring Warren Haynes)	3:57
8.	"Ain't Nobody"	5:09
9.	"James Brown"	3:58
10.	"You Got the Blues"	4:09
11.	"I Need a Woman"	3:19
12.	"Get Me Over You"	4:32
13.	"Family Tree"	5:10
14.	"Love Someone" (Walmart exclusive bonus track)	3:47
15.	"Burnin' Love" (Walmart exclusive bonus track)	3:28
Total length:		53:09

== Charts ==
Chart (2018)	Peak position
Austrian Albums (Ö3 Austria)	19
German Albums (Offizielle Top 100)	11
Scottish Albums (OCC)	4
Swiss Albums (Schweizer Hitparade)	9
UK Albums (OCC)	7
UK Independent Albums (OCC)	2
US Billboard 200	106
US Top Album Sales (Billboard)	22
US Top Hard Rock Albums (Billboard)	7
US Independent Albums (Billboard)	7
