= Folklore and Superstition =

Studio album by Black Stone Cherry
- Released: August 13, 2008
- Recorded: 2008
- Genre: Hard rock, Southern rock
- Length: 52:57 (66:52 with bonus tracks)
- Label: Roadrunner
- Producer: Bob Marlette

Black Stone Cherry chronology
Black Stone Cherry (2006)	Folklore and Superstition (2008)	Between The Devil and the Deep Blue Sea (2011)

Singles from Folklore and Superstition
- 1. "Blind Man" Released: June 16, 2008; 2. "Please Come In" Released: November 14, 2008; 3. "Things My Father Said" Released: June 15, 2009; 4. "Soulcreek" Released: September 4, 2009

Professional ratings
Review scores
Source	Rating
About.com	link
AllMusic	link
ARTISTdirect	link
Hard Rock Hide Out	link
Kerrang!	3/5 stars
MEN Media	link
Metal Hammer	8/10 stars

Folklore and Superstition is the second studio album by American rock band Black Stone Cherry.

The band recorded the album at Black Bird Studios, which is owned and operated by country artist Martina McBride, in Nashville, Tennessee. It was produced and mixed by veteran rock producer Bob Marlette (Alice Cooper, Ozzy Osbourne, Saliva, Seether, Shinedown). The album was available for audio streaming through NME as of August 13, 2008, and for general release on August 18. The week beginning August 24, the album reached the number one position in the UK Rock Album Chart in its debut week, and number 23 on the main Top 200 UK Albums Chart. It debuted in Sweden at No. 50.

== Track listing ==
All tracks are written by Black Stone Cherry and Bob Marlette.

No.	Title	Length
1.	"Blind Man"	3:40
2.	"Please Come In"	3:56
3.	"Reverend Wrinkle"	4:12
4.	"Soulcreek"	3:37
5.	"Things My Father Said"	3:53
6.	"The Bitter End"	4:07
7.	"Long Sleeves"	4:17
8.	"Peace Is Free"	4:10
9.	"Devil's Queen"	4:38
10.	"The Key"	4:27
11.	"You"	4:22
12.	"Sunrise"	3:48
13.	"Ghost of Floyd Collins"	3:50

iTunes version
No.	Title	Length
14.	"Junkman"	3:20
15.	"Stranger"	3:39

Special edition disc two
No.	Title	Length
1.	"Yeah Man"	2:59
2.	"Big City Lights"	4:23
3.	"Bulldozer"	3:54
4.	"We Are the Kings"	3:55
5.	"Cowboys"	3:02
6.	"Drinkin' Champagne"	3:37
7.	"Peace Is Free" (acoustic)	3:59
8.	"Hell and High Water" (acoustic)	4:25
9.	"Lonely Train" (acoustic)	4:07
10.	"Maybe Someday" (acoustic)	3:43

== Personnel ==
- Chris Robertson – lead vocals, lead guitar
- Ben Wells – rhythm guitar, backing vocals
- Jon Lawhon – bass guitar, backing vocals
- John Fred Young – drums, piano, backing vocals

== Charts ==
Chart (2008)	Peak position
French Albums (SNEP)	167
German Albums (Offizielle Top 100)	54
Scottish Albums (OCC)	26
Swedish Albums (Sverigetopplistan)	45
Swiss Albums (Schweizer Hitparade)	89
UK Albums (OCC)	23
UK Rock & Metal Albums (OCC)	1
US Billboard 200	28
US Top Hard Rock Albums (Billboard)	4
US Top Rock Albums (Billboard)	9

== Certifications ==
Certifications for Folklore and Superstition
Region	Certification	Certified units/sales
United Kingdom (BPI)	Gold	100,000^{‡}
^{‡} Sales+streaming figures based on certification alone.
