= Black Stone Cherry =

American rock band

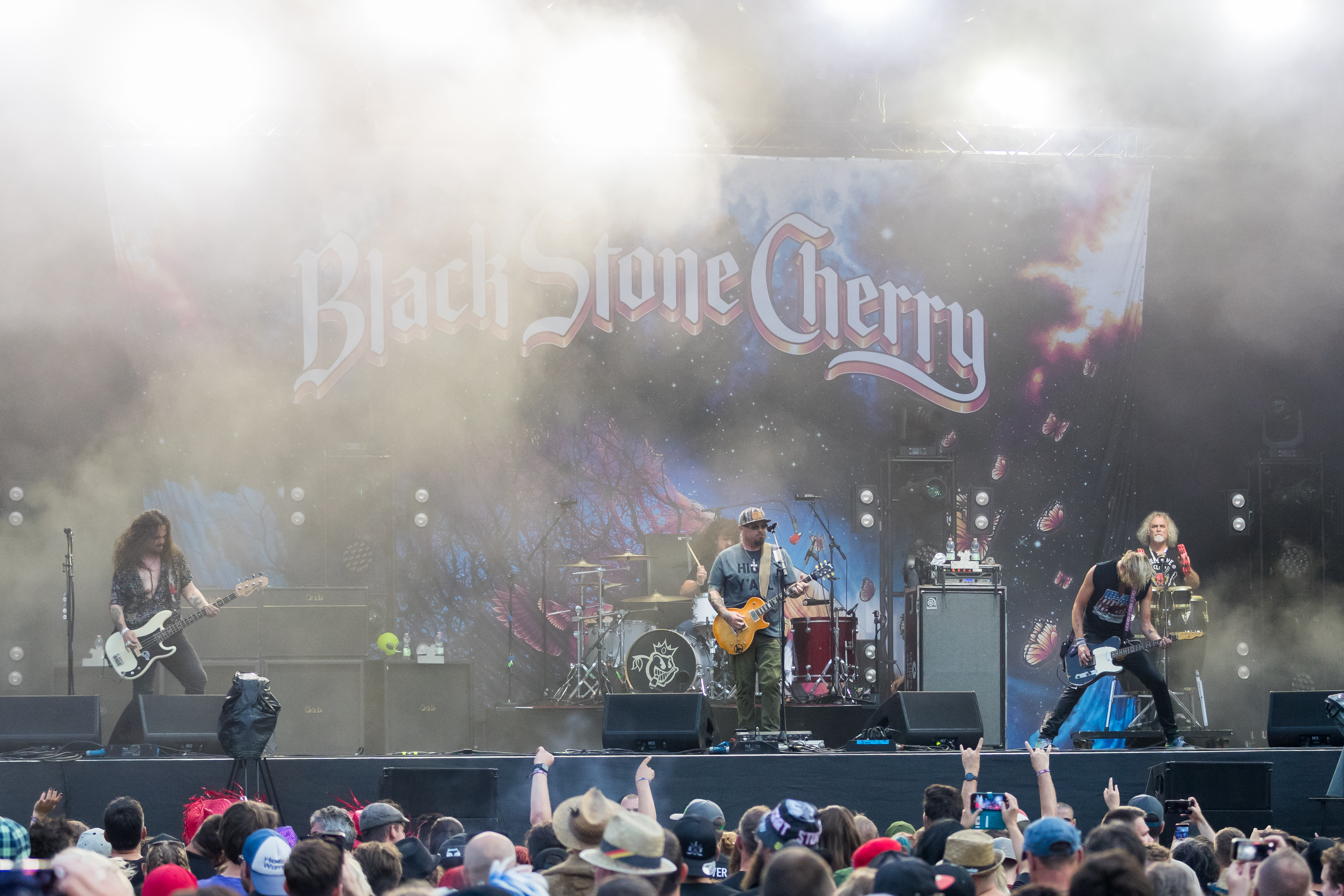
- Black Stone Cherry performing in 2024

Background information
- Origin: Edmonton, Kentucky, U.S.
- Genres: Hard rock; Southern rock
- Years active: 2001–present
- Labels: Roadrunner, Mascot
- Members: Chris Robertson; Ben Wells; John Fred Young; Steve Jewell Jr.
- Past members: Jon Lawhon
- Website: blackstonecherry.com
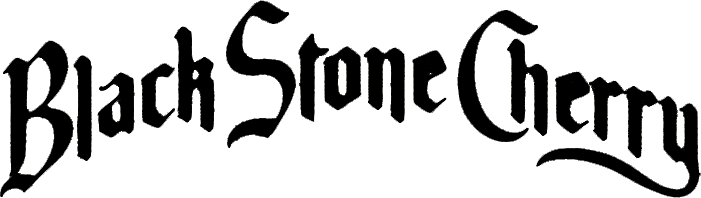

Black Stone Cherry is an American hard rock band formed in Edmonton, Kentucky in 2001. They were signed to Roadrunner Records until 2015; the band is now signed to Mascot Label Group. The band consists of Chris Robertson (vocals, guitar), Ben Wells (guitar), Steve Jewell (bass) and John Fred Young (drums). Black Stone Cherry has released eight studio albums as well as three EPs and have charted seventeen singles on the US Mainstream Rock Tracks charts. Their latest album, Screamin' at the Sky, was released in 2023.

== History ==
=== 2001–2004: Formation and early years ===
Black Stone Cherry originated in Edmonton, Kentucky. Chris Robertson and John Fred Young, son of The Kentucky Headhunters' rhythm guitarist Richard Young, started to play music together early in their teens and were soon joined by Wells and Lawhon. Black Stone Cherry officially formed on June 4, 2001. They then took over the practice house which had been used by The Kentucky Headhunters since 1968 and began to record tracks. They also began holding shows at clubs in the area, and after a short while they gained a large following of people of all ages in the town. In 2003, on Black Stone Cherry Records, the band released their first demo on CD called Rock N' Roll Tape.

=== 2005–2007: Black Stone Cherry ===
The band's debut self-titled album was released in May 2006. After the band finished recording, they returned to Edmonton, invited by their former school principal, for a homecoming gig in the gym of the local middle school, which was attended by 1500 people. As the band entered the town, the streets were filled with people holding "welcome home" signs.

In July 2007, they released a second recording, an EP which contained the song "Rain Wizard" along with two previously unreleased tracks.

Their first live album was released on October 31, 2007. It was recorded at the Astoria in London, and copies were sold to the crowd immediately after the concert. The album is a strictly limited edition, and as of January 2013 mint copies were selling for £200 on Amazon.

=== 2008–2009: Folklore and Superstition ===
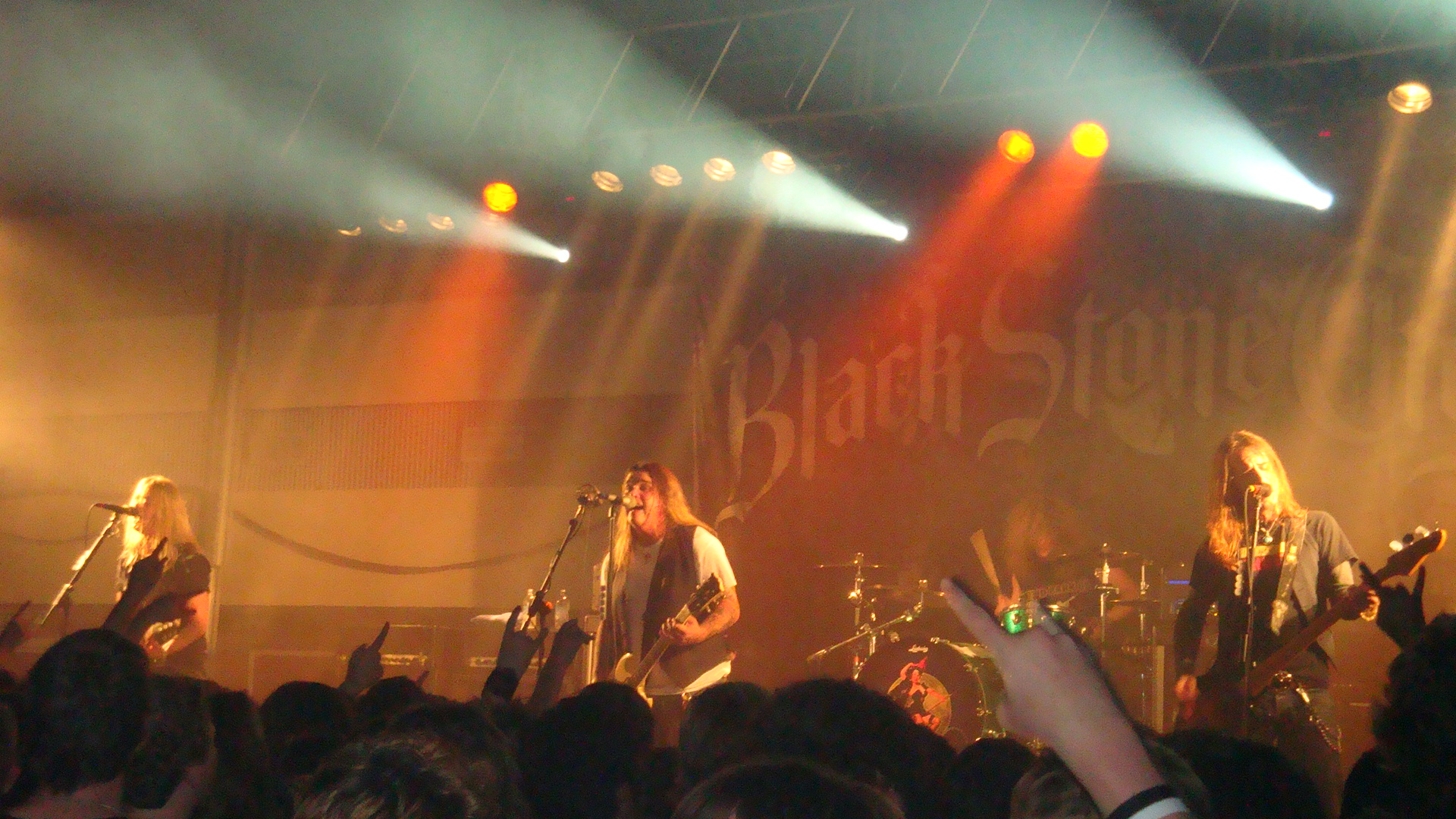
Black Stone Cherry performing in 2009

On August 19, 2008, Black Stone Cherry released their second album, entitled Folklore and Superstition. Four singles from the album, "Blind Man", "Please Come In", "Things My Father Said", and "Soulcreek" were released.

In 2008, the band supported Def Leppard and Whitesnake on their UK arena tour.

In May 2009, they supported Nickelback on their Dark Horse tour.

The band first appeared at Download Festival in June 2008.

=== 2010–2012: Between the Devil and the Deep Blue Sea ===
Their third album Between the Devil and the Deep Blue Sea was released on May 31, 2011. The album was produced by Howard Benson. The first single was titled "White Trash Millionaire" and was released at the end of March. The band was nominated for Best New Artist at the Classic Rock Awards in 2011.

The band supported Alter Bridge alongside Theory of a Deadman on a tour of Europe from October to November 2011. Cavo co-headlined a tour with Black Stone Cherry in February 2012 with Rains as support. The band also headlined their own UK tour (which sold out) supported by Rival Sons. They opened for Chickenfoot on their American tour in the spring of 2012.

=== 2013–2015: Magic Mountain ===
Black Stone Cherry opened for Lynyrd Skynyrd and Bad Company on their co-headlining tour. The band recorded a new album in fall 2013, through early 2014. Magic Mountain was released on May 6, 2014, reaching number five in the UK albums chart. The first single was "Me and Mary Jane". The single along with a selection of Black Stone Cherry's hits, exclusive acoustic tracks, and exclusive live tracks from Download Festival 2013 featured on a special CD: "Black Stone Cherry – Hits, Rarities & Live" which came as bonus content with the June 2014 edition of Classic Rock Magazine. Black Stone Cherry headlined a UK tour with Airbourne and Theory of a Deadman in October 2014, before embarking on a European tour.

The band took a break from touring due to private circumstances, except a one-off home show in December 2014 in Kentucky. The break ended when a US tour began in February 2015. In June, the band were the headliners of Download Festival's second stage, followed some supporting dates at smaller venues in the UK and Ireland.

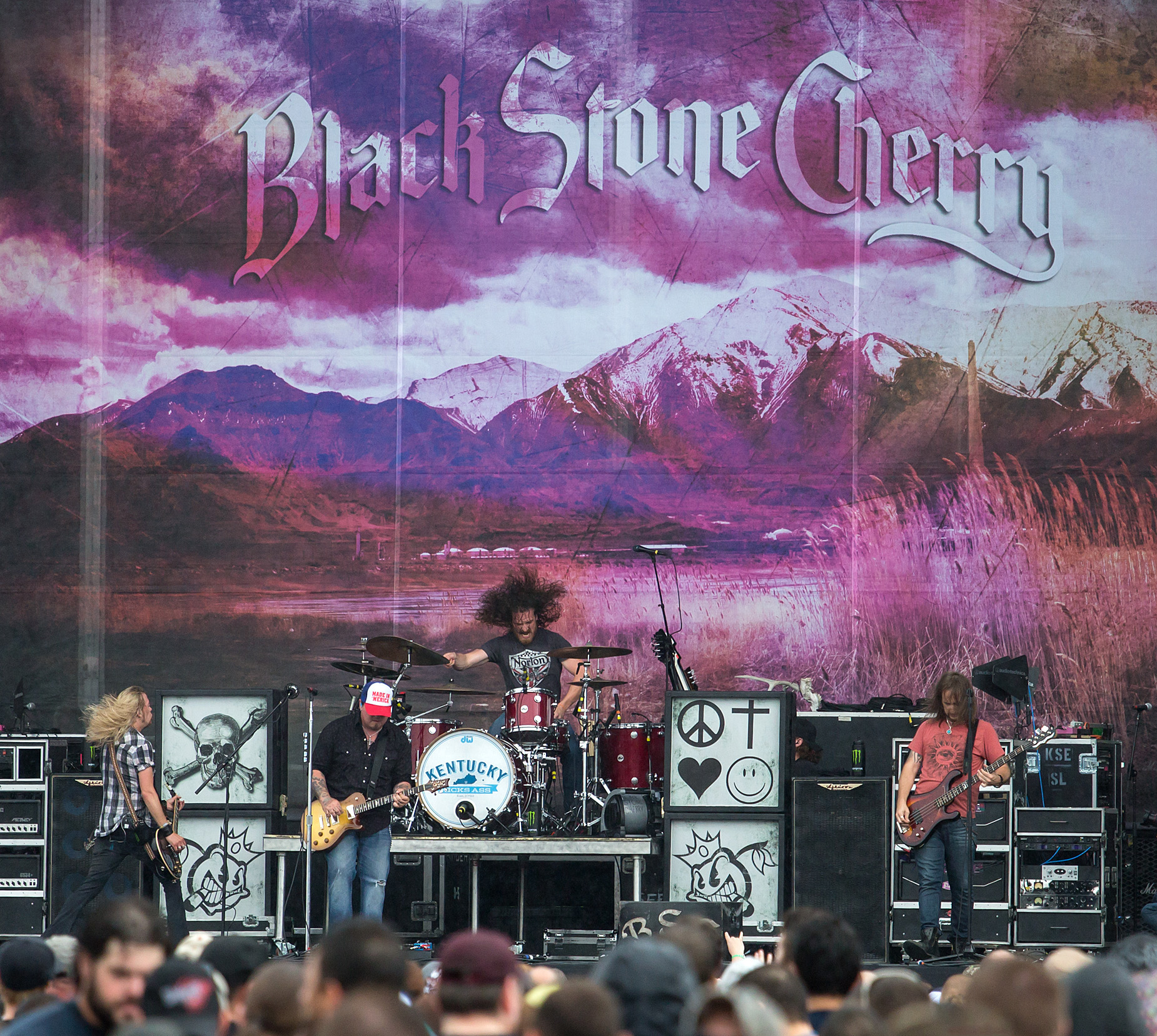
Black Stone Cherry performing in San Antonio, Texas, in 2014

In June, the band announced a UK arena tour as part of the Carnival of Madness package alongside Shinedown, Halestorm and Highly Suspect.

The band released their first live DVD, entitled Thank You: Livin' Live on October 30, 2015, featuring footage filmed during the Magic Mountain tour cycle.

=== 2016–2017: Kentucky and Black to Blues ===
On October 7, 2015, it was revealed that the band had signed to Mascot Label Group and had begun recording the follow-up to Magic Mountain for a 2016 release. The album was recorded in the same location as the self-titled album; Glasgow, Kentucky.

The album, entitled Kentucky, was released on April 1, 2016, and became their second consecutive #1 album on the Billboard Hard Rock albums chart. The album's artwork and track list were revealed, and a new single called "The Way of the Future" was released. The video for the first single from Kentucky, "In Our Dreams" was released on February 3 via YouTube. On July 21, 2016, a video for the new single called "The Rambler" was released on YouTube which featured an appearance from Billy Ray Cyrus.

From late May until the middle of June 2017, the ensemble performed with American rock band Letters from the Fire. They released their first EP Black to Blues of cover songs on September 29, 2017, through Mascot Records.

=== 2018–2019: Family Tree and Black to Blues, Vol. 2 ===
In February 2018, the band released their first single, Burnin', from their new album Family Tree which was released on April 20, 2018, through Mascot Records. They released their second EP in the series of covers Black to Blues, Vol. 2 on October 19, 2019. They spent a part of the tour supporting these releases opening for Alice Cooper.

=== 2020–2022: The Human Condition ===
On August 5, 2020, the band announced their seventh album titled The Human Condition, and released the lead single "Again" the following day. The album was released on October 30, 2020. On June 2, 2021, Black Stone Cherry announced that bassist Jon Lawhon will take an indefinite hiatus from music and touring. In June, the band released their cover of Tracy Chapman's classic "Give Me One Reason" as the lead single from the deluxe edition of The Human Condition.

On April 20, the band announced their second live album/DVD, Live from the Royal Albert Hall, alongside the live performance video of "Ringin' In My Head." The concert came at the end of the UK leg of their tour in support of The Human Condition. It was released on June 24, 2022.

=== 2023–present: Screamin' at the Sky ===
The band announced their new album Screamin' at the Sky would be released on September 29, 2023. Bassist Steve Jewell would be the permanent replacement of Jon Lawhon for the album and beyond.

The band released "This is Black Stone Cherry's RSD Album. The band really likes it." on April 12, 2025. The album features a collection of B-sides, live tracks, covers, and unreleased songs. It also includes collaborations with John Cooper of Skillet, Ayron Jones, Lzzy Hale of Halestorm, and Jesse Leach of Killswitch Engage.

The band's latest EP, Celebrate, was released on March 6, 2026.

== Band members ==
=== Current members ===
- Chris Robertson – lead vocals, lead and rhythm guitar (2001–present)
- Ben Wells – rhythm and lead guitar, backing vocals (2001–present)
- John Fred Young – drums, percussion, piano, backing vocals (2001–present)
- Steve Jewell Jr. – bass, backing vocals (2020–present)

=== Current touring members ===
- Jeffrey Boggs – bongos, congas (2021–present)

=== Former members ===
- Jon Lawhon – bass, backing vocals (2001–2021)

== Discography ==
Studio albums

- Black Stone Cherry (2006)
- Folklore and Superstition (2008)
- Between the Devil and the Deep Blue Sea (2011)
- Magic Mountain (2014)
- Kentucky (2016)
- Family Tree (2018)
- The Human Condition (2020)
- Screamin' at the Sky (2023)
