= List of bands from the San Francisco Bay Area =

This is a list of bands from the San Francisco Bay Area, music groups founded in the San Francisco Bay Area or were closely associated with the region for a significant part of the group's active existence. Individual musicians who formed bands under their own name there are included, but not if they were primarily solo artists. The list is grouped in three sections: San Francisco Peninsula/North Bay, East Bay, and South Bay.

== San Francisco Peninsula/North Bay ==
- The Action Design
- The Aislers Set
- American Music Club
- Andre Nickatina
- Animosity
- Anvil Chorus
- Automatic Pilot
- Avengers
- Babylon A.D.
- Back in the Saddle
- Beaten by Them
- The Beau Brummels
- The Beatnigs
- Beefy Red (based in Marin County, 1969–1972)
- Beulah
- Big Brother and the Holding Company
- Birdmonster
- Blame Sally
- Blaqk Audio
- Blectum from Blechdom
- Black Rebel Motorcycle Club
- Blue Cheer
- Bracket
- Brittany Shane
- The Brian Jonestown Massacre
- The Brothers Comatose
- Buck Naked and the Bare Bottom Boys
- Buckethead
- Butch Engle & the Styx
- Cacophony (band)
- Cal Tjader
- The Cat Heads
- Ceremony (punk band)
- The Charlatans
- Chris Isaak
- Chrome
- Chuck Prophet
- Clover
- Cold Beat
- Con Funk Shun
- Consolidated
- Conspiracy of Beards
- Copperhead
- Cormorant
- Craig Abaya
- Crime
- Crown City Rockers
- The Crux
- The Cubby Creatures
- Dan Hicks and his Hot Licks
- Dan the Automator
- Dave Brubeck Quartet
- David Grisman
- Dead Kennedys
- Deafheaven
- Death Angel
- Deerhoof
- Destroy Boys
- Diego's Umbrella
- The Dils
- The Dodos
- The Donnas
- E-40
- Eddie and the Tide
- Enemy You
- Every Move A Picture
- Eric Lindell
- Eric McFadden
- Faith No More
- The Family Crest
- Fifty Foot Hose
- Film School
- First Blood
- Flamin' Groovies
- Flipper
- 4 Non Blondes
- Frank Loverde
- Frightwig
- Geographer
- Girls
- The Gone Jackals
- Graham Central Station
- Grass Widow
- Grateful Dead
- The Great Society
- H.E.R.
- Her Space Holiday
- Hickey (band)
- Hoodoo Rhythm Devils
- The House Jacks
- Hot Flash Heat Wave
- Hot Tuna
- Huey Lewis and the News
- Imperial Teen
- It's a Beautiful Day
- J Church
- Jay Som
- Jefferson Airplane
- Jefferson Starship
- Jenifer McKitrick
- Jim Campilongo
- John Handy
- Journey
- Kak
- Kaskade
- Karate High School
- Kronos Quartet
- Larry Graham
- Latin Soul Syndicate
- Lee Presson and the Nails
- Leila and the Snakes
- Leon's Creation
- Leviathan (musical project)
- Linda Tillery
- Logos
- Loquat
- LoveLikeFire
- The M Machine
- Mac Dre
- Malo
- Mal Sharpe
- Matt Nathanson
- Matmos
- Metallica (originally from Los Angeles)
- Michael Franti
- Michelle Lambert
- Mink DeVille
- M.I.R.V.
- Moby Grape
- Mojo Men
- Mordred
- Mother Earth
- Mommyheads
- Mount Rushmore
- Mr. Bungle
- N2Deep
- Naked Lunch
- Negativland
- New Riders of the Purple Sage
- Night Ranger
- The Nuns
- Old & In the Way
- The Ophelias (California band)
- Or, The Whale
- Osees
- Ovens
- Oxbow
- The Other Half
- Pablo Cruise
- Pansy Division
- Papa Roach
- Paul Parker
- Patrick Cowley
- Pearl Harbor and the Explosions
- Pointer Sisters
- Psychefunkapus
- Quicksilver Messenger Service
- Razor Skyline
- The Residents
- Romeo Void
- Rosin Coven
- Rubicon
- Rupa and the April Fishes
- Sammy Hagar
- Santana
- Sean Hayes
- Seatrain
- Secret Chiefs 3
- Seventeen Evergreen
- Sly and the Family Stone
- Snakefinger
- Snake River Conspiracy
- Sons of Champlin
- Sopwith Camel
- The Sorentinos
- Spirits Burning
- Steel Breeze
- Steve Miller Band
- Steve Kimock
- The Stone Foxes
- Sugar Pie DeSanto
- Sun Kil Moon
- SVT
- Sweet Trip
- Swell
- Switchblade Symphony
- Thao & the Get Down Stay Down
- Thinking Fellers Union Local 282
- Third Eye Blind
- Those Darn Accordions
- Thunderegg
- Time in Malta
- Toiling Midgets
- Tommy Tutone
- Train
- Translator
- Tsunami Bomb
- The Tubes
- Tupac Shakur
- Turk Murphy
- Tuxedomoon
- Two Gallants
- Tycho
- Ty Segall
- The Union Trade
- The Units
- Until December
- Vain
- Vejtables
- The Velvet Teen
- Vernian Process
- Vetiver
- Victims Family
- Vince Guaraldi
- Voice Farm
- Von
- We Five
- Whirr
- Wire Train
- Wooden Shjips
- X-tal
- Young Elders

== East Bay ==
- Adrian Marcel
- AFI
- All Shall Perish
- American Steel
- Asleep at the Wheel
- Attitude
- Attitude Adjustment
- Automatic Man
- Audrye Sessions
- Blackalicious
- Blatz
- Brett Dennen
- Burner Herzog
- Cold Blood
- Communiqué
- Condemned Attitude
- Commander Cody and His Lost Planet Airmen
- Counting Crows
- Country Joe and the Fish
- The Coup
- The Coverups
- Creedence Clearwater Revival
- Crimpshrine
- Cry Wolf
- Dance Hall Crashers
- The Dandelion War
- Day Wave
- Death Angel
- Defiance
- Deltron 3030
- Digital Underground
- Earth Quake
- En Vogue
- Ensemble Mik Nawooj
- Everyone Is Dirty
- Exodus
- Filth
- Fifteen
- Finish Ticket
- Fleshies
- Forbidden
- The Frustrators
- Frumious Bandersnatch
- Green Day
- The Greg Kihn Band
- Guapdad 4000
- Hazel English
- Heathen
- Hieroglyphics
- High on Fire
- Honeycut
- Hurricane
- Iamsu!
- Idiot Flesh
- Kehlani
- The Jars
- Jason Becker
- Jay Som
- Jellyfish
- Joe Satriani
- Joy of Cooking
- Judgement Day
- Kai
- Lȧȧz Rockit
- Lil B
- Link 80
- The Loading Zone
- The Lonely Island
- The Longshot
- The Lookouts
- The Lovemakers
- Luniz
- Lyrics Born
- Mac Dre
- Machine Head
- Maldroid
- The Matches
- MC Hammer
- Metal Church
- Michael Franti
- Mister Loveless
- Monsula
- Montrose
- The Mother Hips
- The Mr. T Experience
- Negative pH
- The Network
- Neurosis
- New Diplomat
- Operation Ivy
- The Pack
- Papa Wheelie
- Pete Escovedo
- The Phenomenauts
- Pinhead Gunpowder
- The Pointer Sisters
- Poncho Sanchez
- Possessed
- Primus
- Rancid
- Rogue Wave
- The Rubinoos
- Sadus
- Samiam
- Saweetie
- The Savage Resurrection
- Screw 32
- Sentinel
- Set Your Goals
- Shannon and the Clams
- Sheila E
- Spitboy
- Souls of Mischief
- Stoneground
- The Story So Far
- Sweet Baby
- SWMRS
- Testament
- Tilt
- Timex Social Club
- Tony! Toni! Toné!
- Too Short
- Toro y Moi
- Tower of Power
- Tune-Yards
- The Uptones
- Vio-lence
- Vitamin Party
- Y&T

== South Bay ==
- Bassnectar
- The Call
- Camper Van Beethoven
- The Chocolate Watchband
- Chris Cain
- Count Five
- Dada
- DJ Shadow
- The Doobie Brothers
- Dredg
- Drunk Injuns
- Duster
- The Faction
- Lars Frederiksen and the Bastards
- Los Microwaves
- Manmade God
- Monkey
- No Use for a Name
- The Limousines
- Lindsey Buckingham
- Los Tigres del Norte
- Pablo Cruise
- Peninsula Banjo Band
- People!
- Skankin' Pickle
- Skip Spence
- Sleep
- Smash Mouth
- Stained Glass
- Stevie Nicks
- Strata
- Syndicate of Sound
- Systematic
- Sunami
- Trapt
- Tsunami
- Vienna Teng
- Xiu Xiu

== See also ==
- San Francisco Sound
