= Chubby =

Chubby is a word used to describe something that is plump and rounded.

Chubby may also refer to:

== People ==
- W. C. Adams (1888–1972), American politician
- Roy 'Chubby' Brown (born 1945), a UK stand-up comedian
- Junior Byles (born 1948), Jamaican reggae singer also known as "Chubby" or "King Chubby"
- Chubby Carrier (born 1967), American zydeco musician
- Andrew Chandler (golfer) (born 1953), English retired golfer
- Chubby Checker (born 1941), the stage name of American singer Ernest Evans, who popularized "The Twist"
- Popa Chubby, the stage name of American blues performer Theodore "Ted" Horowitz (born 1960)
- William Chubby, a 19th-century organizer of the Church of Christ, a defunct Latter Day Saint sect – see List of sects in the Latter Day Saint movement
- Chubby Cox (born 1955), American retired basketball player, uncle of Kobe Bryant
- Chubby Dean (1915–1970), American Major League Baseball pitcher and first baseman
- Chubby Dudley, a ring name of American retired professional wrestler Bay Ragni (born 1970)
- Chubby Grigg (1926–1983), American National Football League and All-America Football Conference player
- Chubby Hubby, Singaporean blogger Aun Koh (born 1972)
- Chubby Jackson (1918–2003), American jazz musician and bandleader
- Chubby Johnson (1903–1974), American character actor
- Chubby Newsom (1920–2003), American R&B singer
- Chubby Oates (1942–2006), English actor and comedian
- Chubby Parker (1876–1940), American musician and early radio entertainer
- Charles Gavan Power (1888–1968), Canadian politician
- Chubby Wise (1915–1996), American bluegrass fiddler
- Lawrence Woodman, American entrepreneur and restaurant owner who allegedly invented fried clams in 1916

== Brands and enterprises ==
- Chubby (mine detection system), nickname for the Husky VMMD (vehicle-mounted mine detection) family of blast-survivable vehicles
- Chubby, the brand name of a non-alcoholic drink manufactured by S. M. Jaleel and Company
- Chubby, a distributed lock manager developed and used by Google

== Other uses ==
- Chubby, slang for a penile erection
- Chubby, slang for a joint (cannabis)
- Chubby Huggs, a character in the Get Fuzzy comic strip

== See also ==
- Chub (disambiguation)
- Chub (gay culture), also called "chubby culture"
- Cubby (disambiguation)
