= Sarajevo Blues =

Poetry collection by Semezdin Mehmedinović

Sarajevo Blues is a collection of poetry and prose written by Semezdin Mehmedinović during the siege of Sarajevo. It was first published in 1992 in Ljubljana, as part of the Biblioteka series, which provided a forum for Bosnian writers during the war. An extended version was published in 1995.

An English translation by Ammiel Alcalay was published in 1998, after Mehmedinović's relocation to the US.

== Contents ==
In Sarajevo Blues, Semezdin Mehmedinović tells the story of a city under siege. The poet lived in the city and tells the story of resistance to nationalistic fervor. The Washington Post described the book of poetry as "widely considered here to be the best piece of writing to emerge from this besieged capital since Bosnia's war erupted".

== Musical version ==
A musical version by Jewlia Eisenberg and her group Charming Hostess was released in 2004. Sarajevo Blues works with Mehmedinović's text to tell the story of the Sarajevo siege, touching on nationalism, genocide, and the life of an artist during war.
