= The Ophelias =

The Ophelias may refer to:

- The Ophelias (California band), a psychedelic rock band active in the 1980s
- The Ophelias (Ohio band), an indie/art rock band active since 2015
