= Barrington Hall (Berkeley, California) =

Building in Berkeley, California, USA

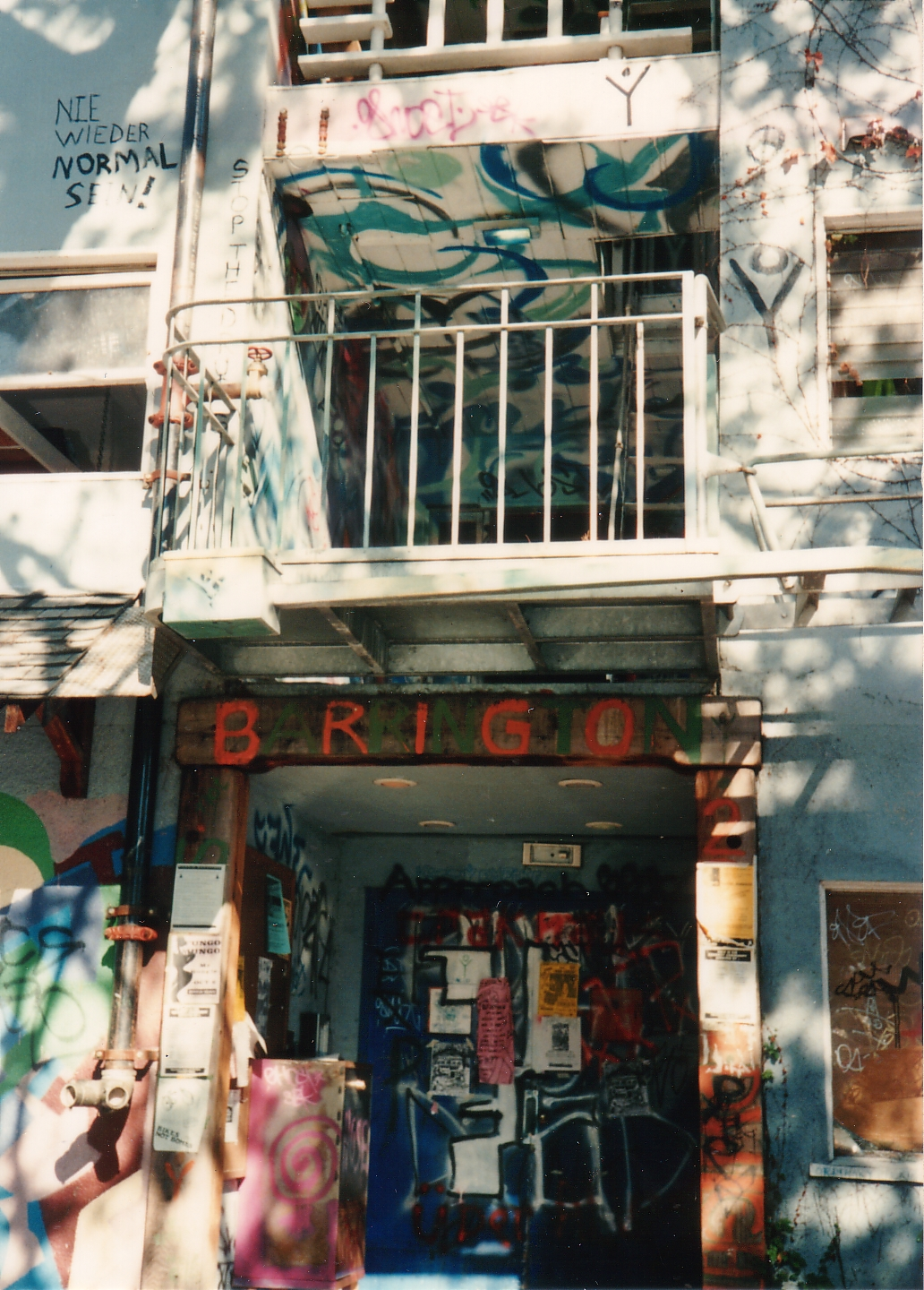
- The front of Barrington Hall in fall 1989

General information
- Type: Student housing cooperative
- Location: 2315 Dwight Way (south entrance); 2316 Haste St. (north entrance), Berkeley, California
- Coordinates: 37°51′53.2″N 122°15′44.2″W
- Opened: 1935
- Closed: 1990 (as Barrington Hall)

Technical details
- Floor count: 4

Barrington Hall was a student housing cooperative in the University Students' Cooperative Association (USCA) (now known as the Berkeley Student Cooperative (BSC)) system in Berkeley, California, from 1935 to 1943 and 1950 to 1989. It is currently privately operated student housing.

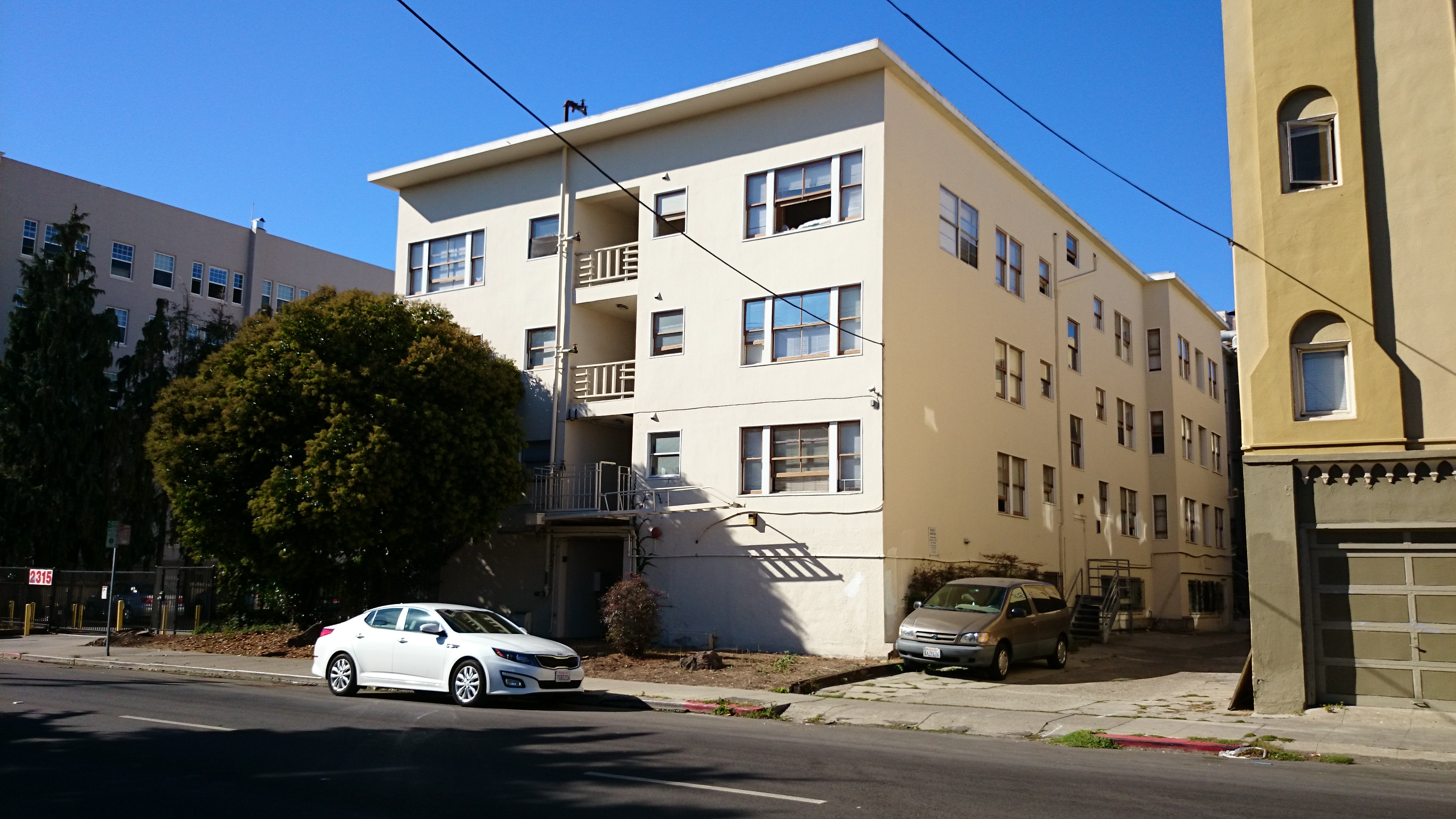
The state of what was once known as Barrington Hall, October 2014

== History ==
The original Barrington Hall was a Sigma Nu fraternity house on Ridge Road leased from that fraternity in 1933. In 1935 the lease was allowed to expire and USCA purchased a building located at 2315 Dwight Way, to which the name Barrington Hall was transferred. The building was formerly the largest apartment house in Berkeley and would host 200 men when it opened the same year. It was leased to the U.S. Navy from 1943 to 1948; the Navy returned the building significantly upgraded. Barrington Hall, along with all the USCA residences, was always open to all students regardless of race, religion or nationality. In 1967, Barrington Hall's house council voted to become co-ed, which prompted the university to revoke their accreditation on the grounds of acting "in loco parentis".

Throughout its history, Barrington Hall had a reputation for supporting social and political activism. In 1960, "Cal undergrads, particularly residents of the Barrington Hall co-op on Dwight Way, were part of the crowd of demonstrators protesting against the San Francisco meeting of the House Committee on Un-American Activities." By the time of the People's Park Riots in May 1969, Barrington Hall, which was only two blocks from People's Park, was an infamous place in Berkeley. The devotion to cooperation in a nation committed to competition bore radical fruit after thirty-five years. Barrington became a 'safe house' for deviance, good or ill. It was safe for unmarried men and women to live together, safe to paint and draw on the walls, safe to do or sell any drug, safe to crash in if you had no other place to stay. In the 1970s and 1980s, some of its members were very active in the anti-apartheid movement, and offered sanctuary and meals to the homeless. In 1984, Barrington residents voted to make the Hall open as an official sanctuary for refugees from El Salvador.

According to the San Francisco Chronicle, complaints against Barrington started piling up in the early 1960s. One example from 1983 noted: "Resident complains not fit for habitability. Live boa constrictor, fire, dried blood on her door, food and burning matches thrown at dinner, person wandering through halls brandishing a whip and striking the walls with it." In the 1980s, the co-op was the focus of numerous accusations regarding drugs and noise. According to the United States Court of Appeals, Ninth Circuit,

Barrington Hall's reputation was larger than life, even by California standards.... If Berkeley, California, was the last bastion of sixties counterculture, Barrington Hall, the city's oldest and largest student housing co-operative, was surely the last rampart. While much of Berkeley became stuffy and conventional, the residents of Barrington Hall clung to their freewheeling ways. A bit too freewheeling, according to two of Barrington's neighbors. They claim that the co-op's denizens engaged in massive drug-law violations, turning the neighborhood into a drug-enterprise zone.... Barrington Hall prided itself on fostering alternative lifestyles.... Its bizarre and irreverent rituals included nude dinners with themes like Satan's Village Wine Dinner and the Cannibal Wine Dinner—the latter complete with body-part shaped food. These bacchanalian festivals often turned riotous...."

In 1989, after three previous attempts to close the hall, all defeated within the USCA by campaigns organized by Barringtonians and former Barringtonians, it was closed by a USCA referendum intended to stem the growing liability associated with Barrington's wild atmosphere. The closure was fought by the residents during the referendum campaign, in court and in the building by student squatters. In 1990, the USCA president stated "Barrington has a larger-than-life reputation. All across the continent, people know it as a drug den and anarchist household." The East Bay Express called it "the great Breughel painting of Berkeley campus counterculture," which was doomed by "a cocktail of drugs and radical-left politics". The San Francisco Chronicle wrote, "Berkeley's last student bastion for radical behavior, is expected to close today—burying a civilization Margaret Mead might have chosen for her final expedition into cultural anthropology." The squat climaxed in a night-long riot — in March, 1990, which began as a poetry reading — involving Berkeley police, off-duty police officers (hired by the USCA), and the residents. Fires burned 20 feet high, and 17 people were arrested. Squatters were readmitted to the building the next day. A week later, one was killed in a fall from the roof occupied by security guards. The final eviction of all residents took place in September 1990.

Barrington Hall was renamed Evans Manor and currently serves as privately-operated student housing. The building was leased for 35 years until BSC regained control in April 2025. In late 2025, the BSC accepted a $6 million offer for the sale of the building.However, the negotiations fell through during escrow.

== Musical history ==
Before legal arbitration with the neighbors in 1984, Barrington was a launching pad and petri dish for Bay Area Punk, and bands played frequently.

In the early 1980s, the house band for several wine dinners was the Lemmings, whose song "I'm on Sound" described the Barrington experience, with the chorus of the Onghh Yaangh tenet, "Those who say don't know. Those who know don't say." This song appeared on their eponymous first record, and the album's cover art, by Barry Spencer, was reproduced as one of the many murals on the Hall's walls.

The song "Frizzle Fry" by the band Primus as well as the theme of their album, Tales From the Punchbowl, was inspired by one of the Barrington's recurring parties, called "Wine Dinners", held at the house at which punch laced with LSD was served. The pop group Camper Van Beethoven played at one such "Wine Dinner" in 1988–89, under the name Vampire Can Mating Oven. Black Flag, Flipper, X, The Ophelias, NOFX, Operation Ivy and Dead Kennedys played at Barrington in the 1980s, along with hundreds of other punk rock bands. The song "Barrington Hall" by Les Claypool's Frog Brigade, released in 2002, is all about Barrington, and includes the lyrics "Just when I had thought I'd seen it ah ah ah all, I stumbled 'round the corner into Barrington Hall. Does anyone here remember Barrington Hall? Does anybody here remember Barrington? They care not for wrong or right, they electrocute the night, the people that live in Barrington Hall...."

The legal arbitration restricted Barrington to three parties a semester with "amplified music", and so bands could only perform at Wine Dinners after that.

Musicians in the mid- to late-80s Barrington house band Acid Rain (later renamed Idiot Flesh) went on to perform with Charming Hostess, Sleepytime Gorilla Museum and Faun Fables.

== Murals ==
Much of the building, which was four stories high and a block deep, was covered with murals and graffiti.

"Every surface in Barrington was covered with psychedelic murals and layer upon layer of graffiti. The graffiti wasn't just tags—it contained long debates about revolution, religion, art, everything.... which would go on for years."

The tradition of murals began in the 1960s, and many of the "original" murals were painted by house members, such as a large mural of the Beatles Yellow Submarine. As times changed, so did the murals; the 1980s murals were more punk rock. But old murals were considered sacred by house by-laws, and so the artistic expressions of several decades adorned Barrington, making its walls a living history of late 20th-century counterculture in the U.S. One mural from the 1970s was of Sacco and Vanzetti. A prominent mural from the 1980s, painted in a neo-psychedelic style and with Japanese anime characteristics, made reference to 1950s icon Disneyland. Stationed just inside the front entrance of the building, it said:

"Welcome to Barrington, kids! Please keep your hands and arms inside the ride at all times."

Graffiti was a tradition that began in the 1980s, and consisted of everything from large multi-color spray paint tag designs to merely scrawled words, such as "Only seven more shopping days till Armageddon."

== Insect banquet ==
For many years, there was a yearly insect banquet at Barrington Hall at which entomophagy was practiced. It was often mentioned in Herb Caen's column in the San Francisco Chronicle.

== New Member Disorientation ==
At the beginning of every semester in the 1980s, a new member orientation, called the "New Member Disorientation", was held for incoming students. The Fall Disorientation required all incoming members endure a legendary party where two films competed against hours of nitrous oxide provided by The House. One of the super 8mm films was "Leo+Phred"; an under-grad assignment, it represents an homage to the spirit of radical, enduring friendship in spite of political differences. Leo+Phred portrays two students engaging in friendly acts while miming support for Nicaragua's Freedom Fighters with an abundance of illegal party-favors; and screened alongside an original electro-acoustic soundtrack composed on campus. Disorientation also required the memorization of a 1980 claymation work: "The Onngh Yanngh Movie", featuring the impenetrable iconic wisdom of Barrington's resident-spirit who reveres Lao Tzu: "those who tell don't know, and those who know don't tell." The film humorously reveals the origin-myths of Onngh Yanngh in the "land of Fremont". Eventually when the neighbors filed a lawsuit against the USCA under the Racketeer Influenced and Corrupt Organizations Act (RICO) for drug sales in the building, one of their allegations was that Barrington actually did have a code of silence.

Cover art for The Barrington Bull, the periodical created at the Barrington Hall

== Barrington Bull ==
The Barrington Bull was an in-house publication of Barrington Hall, published from 1936 to 1989. (The name was briefly changed to The Barbarrington in 1938.) It was the first USCA publication of any kind. Volume I Number I of The U.C.S.C.A. News appeared on October 24, 1938, "a publication," claimed the lead article, "designed to create greater unity of purpose and action among the five houses of the co-operative association." Ed Wright, the editor, was also the editor of The Barbarrington. Terry Carr and Ron Ellik, later to achieve great success in the science fiction field and indeed to win a Hugo Award for their fanzine, FANAC, were editors in the 1950s. In the 1960s, a tradition of giving each issue a theme began with Guy Lillian, also a Hugo nominee, one of whose issues (with cover by Pat Yeates) is shown here. Some themes from the 1970s include: The "Onngh Yanngh" Bull, Spring 1978 The "Wasted" Bull, May 1978 and "The Hippie Ghetto" Bull, Fall 1979.

== Heroin ==
In 1986, the house manager admitted to being addicted to heroin. According to George Proper, Manager of the USCA in 1987, residents of Barrington Hall had started to use heroin by 1985. In 1986, the USCA threatened to close Barrington after two heroin overdoses, and after it became apparent that nearly a dozen residents were using heroin.

== Lawsuits ==
Neighbors filed federal and state lawsuits against Barrington and the USCA, in an attempt to stop heroin dealing and collect monetary damages for loss of property value under the RICO act. "According to the factual allegations of plaintiffs' complaint, Barrington Hall residents collectively agreed at a house meeting to allow drug dealing at Barrington. At least nineteen different individuals within the co-operative sold drugs there, and drug sales have allegedly been going on at Barrington for over twenty years." The federal suit was dismissed in 1992. The U.S. Supreme Court declined to grant a writ to consider whether to reinstate the federal lawsuit against Barrington on plaintiffs' theory that nuisance damage actionable as property damage under state law can, for purposes of finding a federal RICO violation, serve as the property damage necessary to such a federal action.

The state court action continued after the federal courts declined to allow a federal racketeering suit. In 1989, the co-op voted to close Barrington. Its managers accepted the decision writing co-op members in November, 1989 that: "Although other co-op houses have had problems and difficult periods, the intensity and duration of the Barrington 'problem' is unprecedented."

== Notable Barrington residents ==
- Erik Davis, writer, scholar, journalist, and public speaker known for his work on technology, esoterica and counterculture.
- John C. Dvorak, columnist, broadcast personality, co-host No Agenda show
- Jewlia Eisenberg, co-founder of avant-rock band Charming Hostess.
- Andreas Floer, mathematician specialising in the areas of geometry, topology, and mathematical physics; inventor of Floer homology
- Agustin Fuentes, professor of anthropology at Princeton
- Micah Garen, Journalist and documentary filmmaker, author of the Iraq war memoir American Hostage
- Brian Herbert, author of numerous science fiction novels
- Rodney Koeneke, poet and author of critical study of I. A. Richards
- Film and television director Michael Lehmann
- Giovanni Rossi Lomanitz, physicist who was prevented from working on the Manhattan Project with Robert Oppenheimer, due to FBI surveillance
- Bob Pisani, CNBC reporter since 1990
- Journalist Sam Quinones, author of two books of nonfiction stories about Mexico, now with the Los Angeles Times
- Karl Taube, Professor of Anthropology and scholar and author of Ancient Mesoamerican writing and religion.
- Michael Tigar, lawyer for the Chicago Seven
- Steve Wozniak co-founder, Apple
- Nancy Skinner (California politician), Barrington Hall
