= Charming Hostess =

American band

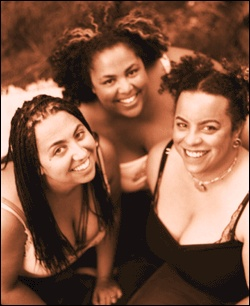
- The Charming Hostess trio, Jewlia Eisenberg, Cynthia Taylor, & Marika Hughes (Left to Right)

Background information
- Origin: Oakland, California, United States
- Genres: Rock; A cappella Experimental rock folk rock Jewish rock
- Years active: 1999–present
- Label: Tzadik Records
- Members: Marika Hughes; Cynthia Taylor; Jason Ditzian; Shahzad Ismaily; Ches Smith
- Past members: Jewlia Eisenberg; Nils Frykdahl; Dan Rathbun; Carla Kihlstedt; Wes Anderson; Nina Rolle; Amy Armstrong

Charming Hostess is an American band that grew out of the avant-rock scene of Oakland, California in the mid-1990s.

== Current work ==
The music of Charming Hostess primarily springs from three women with an emphasis in the body—voices and vocal percussion, handclaps and heartbeats, sex-breath and silence. The work grows from diaspora consciousness: both Jewish and African. Stylistically, Charming Hostess incorporates doo-wop, Pygmy counterpoint, Balkan harmony and Andalusian melody. Contemporary influences on the band include Meredith Monk and Reinette l'Oranaise. The music often explores existing text and overlays the composer's (Jewlia Eisenberg) own questions of authenticity, montage, and the effect of music on non-verbal languages.

The Bowls Project Album (Release Summer 2010): Based on inscriptions from ancient Babylonian Jewish amulets, The Bowls Project, as Charming Hostess. (Tzadik Records, Radical Jewish Culture, 2010) sings of mysticism and magic, angels and demons, and the trials and joys of love and sex. The album highlights the aspirations of Talmudic women and integrates Babylonian devotional songs and apocalyptic American folk music. It features Marc Ribot, Jenny Scheinman, Megan Gould, Jessica Troy, Nils Frykdahl, Dawn McCarthy, Ganda Suthivarakom, Boris Martzinovsky, Aaron Kierbel, and Nir Waxman.

The Bowls Project Installation & Sound Sculpture: As a performance installation and interactive sound sculpture that takes place in a 40’ Catalan vault designed by architect Michael Ramage. Featuring new music composed and performed by Jewlia Eisenberg and Charming Hostess, The Bowls Project is based on texts from ancient Babylonian amulets. The culmination of five years of research, The Bowls Project was exhibited at Yerba Buena Center for the Arts in 2010.

The Bowls Project Background: Bowl amulets also known as Incantation bowls were common 1500 years ago in the area that is now Iraq. Simple bowls were inscribed with a householder's secrets and desires and then buried under the doorway to protect the home. The bowl texts are about “secrets of the home”: love and intimacy, angels and demons, and the trials and joys of daily life. Audible in these texts are the individual voices of women from this period - their work, hopes, and dreams. These spiraled inscriptions are among the few existing records of female voices during the time and place of the Babylonian Talmud.

The 2002 CD Trilectic (Tzadik Records) explored the political/erotic nexus of Walter Benjamin and his Marxist muse, Asja Lācis. The 2004 CD Sarajevo Blues (Tzadik) sets Bosnian poetry by Semezdin Mehmedinović as a form of love and resistance to the brutalization of war.

Their self-described genre is “Nerdy-Sexy-Commie-Girly”. Charming Hostess includes Jewlia Eisenberg, Marika Hughes, Cynthia Taylor and often Ganda Suthivarakom and Pameliya Kursten (all vocals).

== Early work ==
The pre-2002 Charming Hostess (also known as Charming Hostess Big Band) was a rock band that embraced a "genderfuck" sensibility (the women often wore mustaches while the men wore dresses). Early Charming Hostess music drew on women's vocal traditions (primarily from Eastern Europe and North Africa) and integrated them with both white and black American folk forms. Charming Hostess was founded in the fertile anarchy of Barrington Co-op (a.k.a. Barrington Hall), and nurtured by the West Oakland arts community, along with other coeval bands such as Fibulator and Eskimo. Half of Charming Hostess was also in Idiot Flesh/Sleepytime Gorilla Museum.

The genre of this incarnation of ChoHo is described by the band as “Klezmer-Punk/Balkan-Funk”. Recordings of Charming Hostess Big Band include Eat (Vaccination, 1998) and Punch (ReR, 2005). Charming Hostess Big Band was: Jewlia Eisenberg (voice, direction), Carla Kihlstedt (voice, fiddle), Nina Rolle (voice, accordion), Wes Anderson (drums), Nils Frykdahl (guitar, flute, saxophone, percussion), Jenny Scheinman (fiddle), and Dan Rathbun (bass)
