= Dying Is Fun =

Studio album by Everyone Is Dirty
- Released: September 2nd 2014
- Genre: Rock
- Length: 33:22
- Language: English
- Label: Tricycle Records

Dying Is Fun is the debut album by Everyone Is Dirty, released on September 2, 2014 through Tricycle Records.

== Track listing ==
1. Dirtbag Side-Effect
2. California
3. Meltyface
4. Maman, No!!!
5. I'm Okay
6. I Was Born
7. Lost Thing
8. Devastate
9. Isn't It Great
10. Cheesecake II

== Personnel ==
- All Songs Written and Performed by Everyone Is Dirty
- All Tracks Recorded and Mixed by Christopher Daddio at Home in Oakland, CA
- Mastered by Myles Boisen at Headless Buddha Mastering Lab, Oakland CA
- Additional Engineering on Tracks 1,5 & 10 by Gabriel Shepard at Decibelle Recording, SF
- Additional Strings on Tracks 4 & 9 by Celia Harris and Tatiana Ecoiffier
