= Rodney Koeneke =

American poet (born 1968)

- Born: September 12, 1968 (age 57); Omaha, Nebraska
- Education: University of California, Berkeley; Stanford University
- Writing career
- Genre: poetry

Rodney Koeneke (born September 12, 1968) is an American poet.

== Life and career ==
Born in Omaha, Nebraska, Koeneke was raised in Tucson, Arizona and Hacienda Heights, California. He graduated with a BA in History from the University of California, Berkeley in 1990, where he lived in Barrington Hall, and from Stanford University with a PhD in History and Humanities in 1997.

Koeneke is the author of several books and chapbooks of poetry, including Body & Glass (2018), Etruria (2014), Musee Mechanique (2006), and Rouge State (2003). His work has appeared in The Brooklyn Rail, Fence, Granta, Gulf Coast, Harper's, Harriet, The Nation, New American Writing, Poetry, and Zyzzyva.

He lives in Portland, Oregon.

== Works ==
=== Full Length Poetry ===
- Body & Glass (Wave Books, 2018) ISBN 9781940696683
- Etruria (Wave Books, 2014) ISBN 978-1-933517-81-0
- Musee Mechanique (BlazeVOX, 2006) ISBN 978-1934289006
- Rouge State (Pavement Saw, 2003) ISBN 978-1886350632

=== Chapbooks ===
- Seven for Boetticher & Other Poems (Hooke Press, 2015)
- Names of the Hits (of Diane Warren) (OMG!, 2010)
- Rules for Drinking Forties (Cy Press, 2009)
- On the Clamways (Sea Lamb, 2004)

=== Non-fiction ===
- Empires of the Mind: I.A. Richards and Basic English in China, 1929-1979 (Stanford University Press, 2004) ISBN 978-0804748223
