= Or, The Whale =

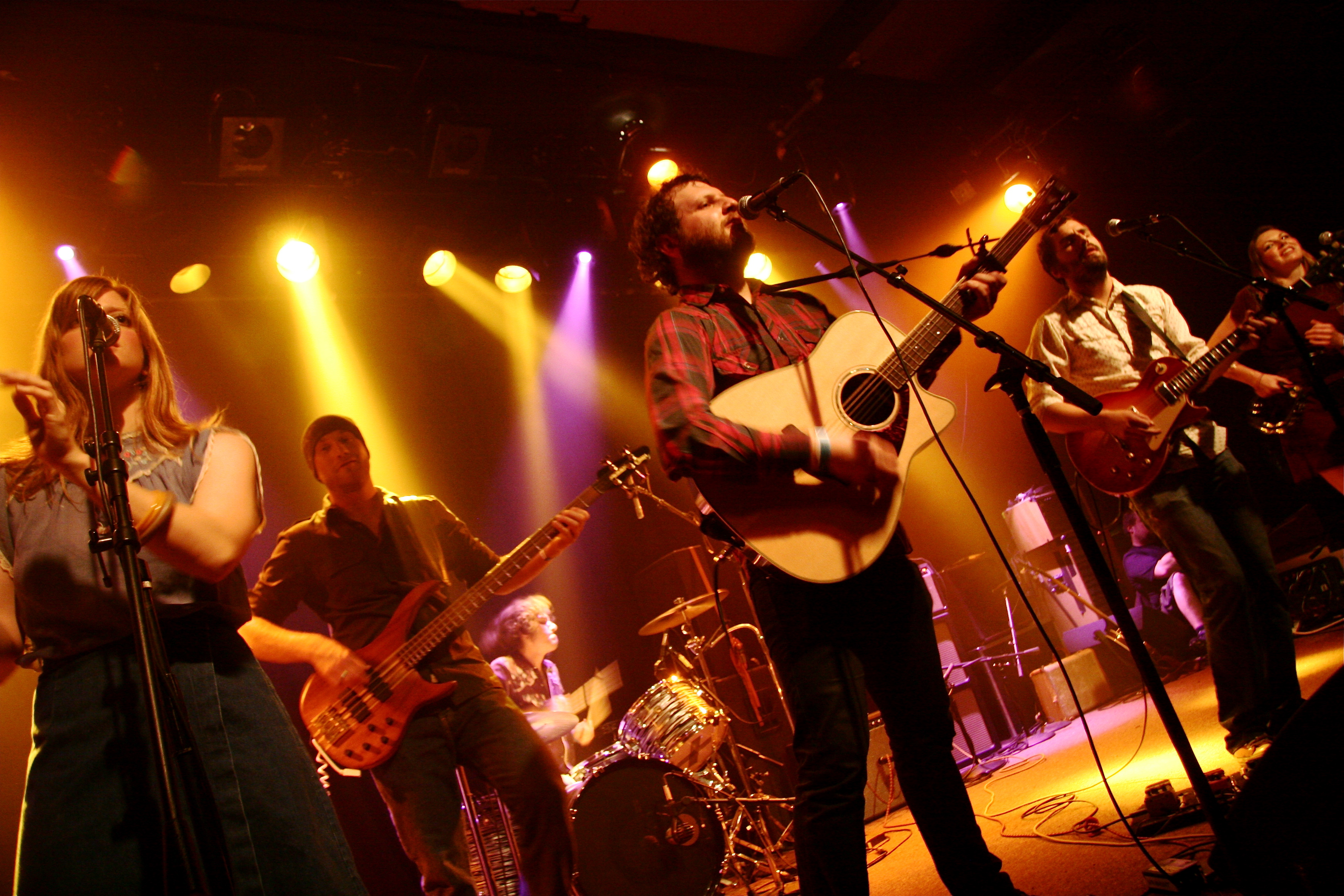
- Or, The Whale performing at Fillmore West

Background information
- Origin: San Francisco, California
- Genres: Americana, country, country rock
- Years active: 2006–2011
- Labels: Seany Records
- Past members: Alex Robins; Matt Sartain; Lindsay Garfield; Julie Ann Thomasson; Justin Fantl; Jesse Hunt; Tim Marcus; Lia Rose; Sean Barnett

Or, The Whale was a San Francisco based Americana band, formed in 2006. The group released two albums, Light Poles and Pines in 2007 and Or, The Whale in 2009. The name of the band is derived from the alternative title of Herman Melville's book Moby-Dick (Moby-Dick; or, The Whale).

== History ==
The group was formed through the website Craigslist, where bandmembers Alex Robins and Matt Sartain (guitar and vocals) posted an advertisement titled "Wanna Form a Sweet country rock Band?". They recruited fellow vocalist Lindsay Garfield from a listing she had written looking for a guitar player, and from there recruited bandmates Julie Ann Thomasson on keyboards and vocals, Justin Fantl on bass, Jesse Hunt on drums, and Tim Marcus on pedal steel guitar.

Or, The Whale released their debut album, Light Poles and Pines, in 2007 independently (in 2009 it was reissued on Seany Records). Their debut single "Call and Response" received airplay on over 135 radio stations, reaching No. 7 on the NMW Indie Chart, No. 18 on the NMW Country Main Chart, and No. 26 on the Radio & Records Americana Chart. The album earned them a 2008 Hollywood Music Award for Best Americana/Roots Artist, as well as a spot on Radio & Records Top 100 Americana Artists of 2008.

After releasing Light Poles and Pine Trees the band began touring nationally, and they released their sophomore effort, eponymously titled Or, The Whale on 15 September 2009, on Seany Records. The album reached No. 69 on the AMA Chart and No. 90 on the CMJ Charts. It was featured in the "New and Noteworthy" section of iTunes' main page, under the Alternative section.

== Recognition ==
Or, The Whale were featured on Good Morning America performing live, and have received attention in publications like USA Today, Paste, Magnet, and Billboard magazines. They have toured and performed shows with groups like the Fleet Foxes, Devil Makes Three, The Dodos, and Two Gallants.

== See also ==
- List of bands from the San Francisco Bay Area
