= Cormorant (band) =

American progressive metal band

- Origin: San Francisco, California, United States
- Genres: Progressive metal, progressive black metal
- Years active: 2007 - 2019
- Labels: Independent
- Members: Marcus Luscombe; Nick Cohon; Matt Solis; Brennan Kunkel
- Website: cormorantmusic.com

Cormorant is an American progressive metal band from San Francisco, California, formed in 2007. The group consists of bassist and vocalist Marcus Luscombe, guitarists Nick Cohon and Matt Solis, and drummer Brennan Kunkel.

Since its inception, the band has remained intentionally and notably independent.

It has eluded a specific genre label by incorporating elements of many different styles of music. While somewhat rooted in black metal, the group has been known to incorporate blues, progressive rock, death metal and folk elements to its music, among others.

The band has released four studio albums and one extended play. The band released its debut EP The Last Tree in 2007, and released the studio albums, Metazoa in September 2009, Dwellings in December 2011 and Earth Diver in April 2014. Their newest album, Diaspora, was released in August 2017.

== History ==
=== Formation and The Last Tree (2007) ===
As described by von Nagel in an interview with the metal website Heavy Blog Is Heavy, the beginnings of the band can be traced to Kunkel and bassist von Nagel meeting while playing in a thrash metal band together in their late teens. After becoming subsequently bored with the limitations of the project, the two proceeded to make attempts at creating and demoing progressive black metal songs with Kunkel on guitar. These demos would form the earliest Cormorant content.

Soon after the duo's first ventures, they proceeded to invite Brennan's friend Nick Cohon from their high school thrash/groove band, Kubla Khan, to the line up. Together, the trio recorded and released The Last Tree EP.

Shortly after its release, the band met Solis at an Enslaved show and recruited him as second guitarist. The complete lineup would then dive straight into the writing and recording of the band's debut album, Metazoa.

=== Metazoa (2009) ===
Metazoa was released on September 22, 2009, to critical praise for its varied and unique sound. With the Billy Anderson-produced album's success propagated by various metal websites and blogs, the band's independently created debut stood as a DIY and underground success. The album's success had the band featured in an exclusive feature on the website Ultimate Guitar Archive, focusing on the band's DIY success.

=== Dwellings (2011) ===
Dwellings was released on December 6, 2011, to further critical praise from both critics and fans alike.

Despite Metazoa's success, it did not receive as much publicity or widespread acclaim as Dwellings did.

Sites including NPR Music, Yahoo! Music and about.com all listed Dwellings in their end of year favorites list, with NPR Music including it as the number-one metal album of 2011. "Dwellings is, far and away, the best metal record of 2011: an emotionally and musically complex album which wrestles with our desperate and sometimes violent attempts to secure a place in history.", said NPR Music's Lars Gotrich.

=== Influences ===
As revealed in various interviews, the band has been known to draw from various different genres, both within and outside of metal. Each of the band's members is known to have very diverse and far-reaching musical tastes that lend themselves in different ways to the band's music.

Kunkel is known to enjoy creating hip-hop beats in his free time, whereas Cohon's previous musical endeavor was an old time fiddle band project as well as a blues band.

Von Nagel references growing up on French folk and classical music before briefly experimenting with many genres such as pop and rock before finding a passion for metal.

=== Lyrics ===
Von Nagel is known to put significant effort into the band's lyrics, which have been a great source of praise for the band's music, cited as poignant and poetic by critics.

Critic Alee Karim described the lyrics on Dwellings as "...the best example of a metal band incorporating topical and relevant lyrics since Ludicra's The Tenant" (2010).

While the band's debut album, Metazoa, focused mostly on themes of nature and the equilibrium of life and death, the topics therein have been varied, ranging the death of 18th century French politician Maximilien de Robespierre on "Uneasy Lies the Head" to a metaphysically explorative descent from heaven to hell on "Hanging Gardens".

Dwellings featured an overarching theme concerning the human spirit and the trials of humanity in pursuit of immortality throughout history. Though a thematic departure from the themes of nature in previous works, von Nagel's poetic and narrative style is consistent throughout the band's work.

=== DIY approach ===
The band has released all of its records independently, despite reportedly being made offers by various record labels.

This DIY approach has become somewhat of a band trademark, especially concerning the marketing done for Dwellings. As part of a pre-order deal made directly with the band, early adopters could choose from a variety of special collector editions of the album, complete with merchandise. These pre-orders sold out quickly, and allowed the band to fund part of the album's recording costs.

The band's DIY success and retention of production quality have made it a common reference to the changing state of the music industry in the metal underground.

Much of the band's independent success can be attributed to its marked Internet presence and use of services such as Bandcamp, which von Nagel has noted as "glorious".

== Band members ==
- Marcus Luscombe – lead vocals, bass guitar (since 2013)
- Nick Cohon – guitars (since 2007)
- Matt Solis – guitars, vocals (since 2008)
- Brennan Kunkel – drums, vocals (since 2007)

== Past band members ==
- Arthur von Nagel – lead vocals, bass guitar (2007–2012)

== Discography ==
Extended plays

- The Last Tree (2007)

Studio albums

- Metazoa (2009)
- Dwellings (2011)
- Earth Diver (2014)
- Diaspora (2017)

== See also ==
- Culture of San Francisco
- List of bands from the San Francisco Bay Area
- List of black-metal bands
- List of progressive-metal bands
