= Jewlia Eisenberg =

American composer (died 2021)

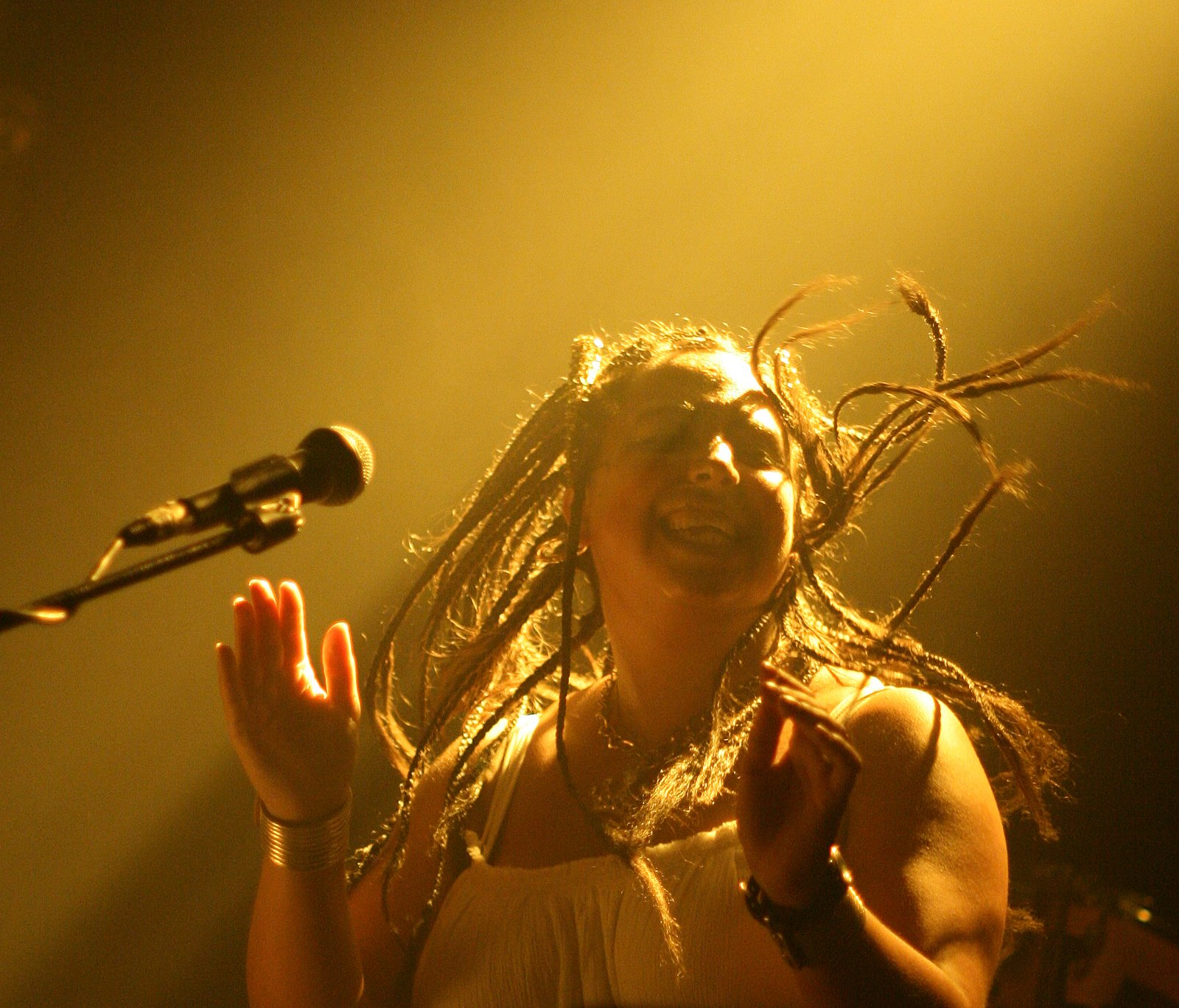
- Jewlia Eisenberg performing in Tel Aviv, Israel, 25 August 2007.

Background information
- Born: 1970/1971; Brooklyn, New York, U.S.
- Origin: New York City, U.S.
- Died: March 11, 2021 (aged 50) Oakland, California, U.S.
- Genres: avant-garde, modern classical music
- Years active: 1998–2021
- Labels: Tzadik, Recommended Records (RéR)
- Formerly of: Charming Hostess
- Website: charminghostess.com

Jewlia Eisenberg (1970/1971 – March 11, 2021) was an American singer, composer, bassist, educator, and cantor. As founder and bandleader of Charming Hostess she coined the term "Nerdy-Sexy-Commie-Girly" to describe her genre of music which spans an eclectic range of styles.

Originally from New York City, Eisenberg became an integral member of the San Francisco Bay Area and the New York Downtown music scenes in the 1990s.

Her music was both physical, using voices, vocal percussion, handclaps, heartbeats, sex-breath, silence, and also intellectual, exploring such topics as Bosnian genocide in Sarajevo Blues (2004) and the political/erotic nexus of Walter Benjamin and his Marxist muse in Trilectic (2002). Both of these works were released on John Zorn's Radical Jewish Series on Tzadik.

She was commissioned from such sources as by the Sloan Foundation and the Goethe Institut SF and has received numerous awards, including: Trust for Mutual Understanding grant for collaboration with poets in ex-Yugoslavia, the Puffin Foundation grant for her Red Rosa project, a Katzenstein Fellow for collaboration with experimental architects and engineers as an Artist-In-Residence at MIT, a Rockefeller Foundation Multi-Arts Production Fund Grant for 'The Grim Arithmetic of Water, with aerial dance choreographer Jo Kreiter, a Goldman Fund Tikea Fellow for project-based radical film and music work with youth, and a Weisz Fellow for field research and recording among Jewish women in the Gondar region of Ethiopia. Eisenberg enjoyed a retreat as part of the Djerassi Resident Artists Program in October–November 2006.

== Early life ==
Eisenberg was born in Brooklyn, New York, and grew up in Starrett City. Her parents were communists, and she stated that she lived with them in "a commune that was for black and Jewish people". Eisenberg's mother was a musician, who encouraged her musical development. She studied music at UC Berkeley, and later travelled the world. She also studied at the Pardes Institute of Jewish Studies.

== Early work ==
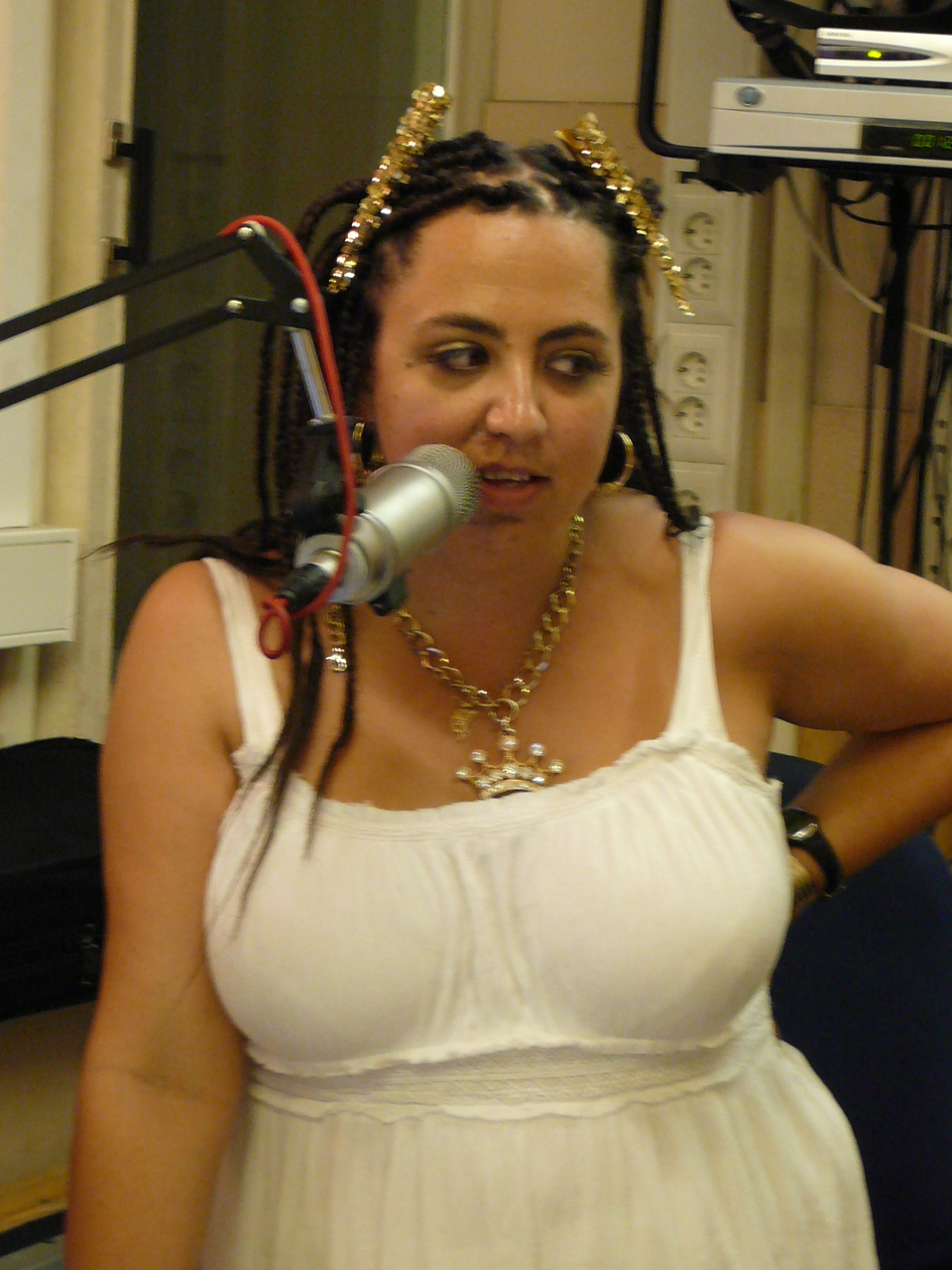
Jewlia Eisenberg performing

Eisenberg's music got a kick-start at University of California in Barrington Hall. It was there that she founded the first incarnation of Charming Hostess. At that time the West Oakland scene was also home to bands such as Fibulator and Eskimo. Half of the members of Charming Hostess were also in Idiot Flesh and Sleepytime Gorilla Museum. Eisenberg has described the genre of early Charming Hostess as "klezmer-punk/balkan-funk". Members included Jewlia Eisenberg (voice, direction), Carla Kihlstedt (voice, fiddle), Nina Rolle (voice, accordion), Wes Anderson (drums), Nils Frykdahl (guitar, flute, saxophone, percussion), and Dan Rathbun (bass).

== Illness and death ==
Eisenberg died on March 11, 2021, of complications from a rare immune disorder known as GATA2 deficiency. News of the artist's death was announced on her social media page later that day.

== Discography as leader ==
- Book of J, self-titled. (3rd Generation Records, 2018)
- The Bowls Project, as Charming Hostess. (Tzadik Records, Radical Jewish Culture, 2010)
- Punch, as Charming Hostess. (Recommended Records, 2005)
- Sarajevo Blues, as Charming Hostess. (Tzadik Records, Radical Jewish Culture, 2004)
- Thick, with Red Pocket. (Tzadik Records, Oracle Women's Series, 2004)
- Trilectic, (Tzadik Records, Radical Jewish Culture, 2002)
- Eat, as Charming Hostess. (Vaccination Records, 1998)

== Contributions ==
- John Zorn: Masada Anniversary Edition Vol. 2: Voices in the Wilderness. (Tzadik Records, Radical Jewish Culture, 2003)
- Various Artists : Great Jewish Music: Sasha Argov. (Tzadik Records, Radical Jewish Culture, 2003)
