= Courage and Consequence =

Karl Rove: Courage and Consequence

Compilation album by Karl Rove
- Released: March 3, 2010
- Genre: Indie rock, rock, noise rock
- Label: Seismic Wave Entertainment

Karl Rove: Courage and Consequence is a grassroots funded compilation of rock songs released on March 3, 2010 in anticipation of Karl Rove's similarly titled memoir. The subtitle of the record is The Unabridged Audio. It was conceived as "an anticipatory sonic recollection of the gross misdeeds attributable to Rove over the past decade".

It is both a compilation album and digital download package, as well as a direct lampoon of Courage and Consequence: My Life As a Conservative in the Fight written by Karl Rove. Project: Courage and Consequence was conceived of, in tandem with the compilation LP to Google bomb the memoir of the similar title and "mess with the search results"

== Track listing ==
1. The Heavenly States - "A Man For Our Times"
2. Rival Dickens - "Forget The Naughts"
3. Have Special Power - "A Rove By Any Other Name"
4. Assistant Cobra - "The Art Of Distraction"
5. Lambs of Abortion - "New American Century"
6. We're Gonna Fight The Eskimos Next (Members of Mount Vicious, Vitamin Party and Bwuh) - "Don't Praise The Machine"
7. Cartographer - "The Biggest Asshole In The World"
8. Death Dream - "Karl Rove, Let's Get Dirty"
9. Generalissimo - "Swarm"
10. Cold Lake - "Courage and Consequence"
11. Hurry Up Shotgun - "Car Bomb"
12. The United Sons Of Toil - "Invention Vs Innovation"
13. Victory And Associates - "Lies, and the Lying Liars that Sell Them"
