= Cubby =

A cubby is a cabinet with cubby holes, usually intended for a pre-school or kindergarten.

Cubby may also refer to:

== In arts and entertainment ==
- Cubby, one of the Lost Boys in Disney's Peter Pan films
- Cubby, the philosophy of The Cubby, a San Francisco-based art collective - see The Cubby Creatures
- Cubby, a character from the 2011 children's TV show, Jake and the Never Land Pirates
- Cubby (film), a 2019 American film
- Cubby (Bluey), an episode of the children's TV show Bluey

== As a nickname ==
- Albert R. Broccoli (1909-1996), American film producer, usually known as "Cubby" Broccoli
- Cubby Bryant (born 1971), American radio personality
- James Davies (rugby union) (born 1990), Welsh rugby union player
- Craig Lathen, 1980s American college basketball player
- Cubby O'Brien (born 1946), one of the original Mouseketeers on the TV show The Mickey Mouse Club
- Hubert Selby Jr. (1928-2004), American writer

== Other uses ==
- Cubby, a Logmein public and private cloud storage system
- Cubby the Bear, mascot of the Hokkaido Nippon-Ham Fighters Japanese baseball team
- Cubby, mascot of the Daytona Tortugas minor league baseball team
- Cubby-hole is a small play house for children.

== See also ==
- Cubbies, a nickname of the Chicago Cubs Major League Baseball team
- Rockford Cubbies, a former name (1995-1998) of the Dayton Dragons minor league baseball team
- Cubby v. CompuServe, a defamation case relevant to cyberlaw
