= Ammiel Alcalay =

American writer

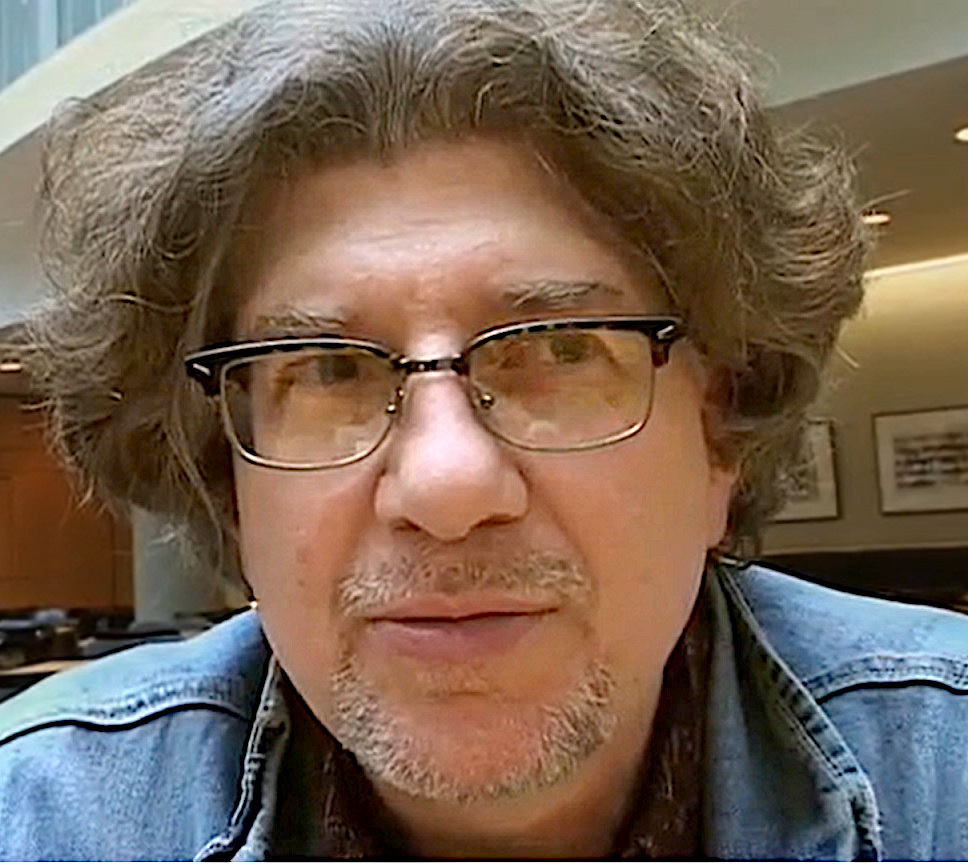
Ammiel Alcalay in Speaking Portraits

Ammiel Alcalay (born 1956) is an American poet, scholar, critic, translator, and prose stylist. Born and raised in Boston, he is a first-generation American, son of Sephardic Jews from Serbia. His work often examines how poetry and politics affect the way we see ourselves and the way Americans think about the Middle East, with attention to methods of cultural recovery in the United States, the Middle East and Europe.

== Brief overview ==
Alcalay is perhaps best known as a Middle Eastern scholar and university instructor. During the war in former Yugoslavia he was a primary source for providing access in the American media to Bosnian voices. He was responsible for publication of the first survivor's account in English from a victim held in a Serb concentration camp, The Tenth Circle of Hell by Rezak Hukanović (Basic Books, 1996), which he co-translated and edited.

Alcalay focused primarily on Hebrew and Jewish literature of the Middle East, in its Islamic, Levantine Arabic, and Israeli contexts. His work on Bosnia during the war in former Yugoslavia has entailed similar efforts at creating the cultural space for unfamiliar works to emerge.

As a university instructor, Prof. Alcalay taught Sephardic literature (both Hebrew and in-translation), Middle Eastern and Mediterranean literacy and intellectual culture and its contemporary and modern reception, at both the undergraduate and graduate levels, as well as creative writing. After Jews and Arabs: Remaking Levantine Culture (1993), Alcalay's first book of scholarship and a critical contribution to Levantine studies, was the subject of a 20th anniversary conference at Georgetown University in 2012. A comparatist by training, Alcalay specializes in these topics and in Balkan literatures and history, poetics, and theories of translation; he publishes translations of Hebrew and Bosnian, as well as his own poetry.

Alcalay was instrumental in recovering and promoting scholarship on the New American Poetry, insisting (as Cole Heinowitz writes) on "the necessary interrelatedness of scholarly, political, and creative endeavors and the individual and collective human experiences from which they grow." Alcalay's book, A Little History (2013), examines the life and work of poet Charles Olson "against the backdrop of the Cold War and Alcalay's personal reflections on the institutionalized production of knowledge, at once investigating the historical relationship between poetry and resistance and enacting the politics of memory and imagination."

Since 2010, with support from the Center for the Humanities at the CUNY Graduate Center, Alcalay was the initiator and general editor of Lost & Found: The CUNY Poetics Document Initiative, a series of student- and guest-edited archival texts emerging from New American Poetry. In 2017, Alcalay was awarded an American Book Award from the Before Columbus Foundation in recognition of this work.

Alcalay's poetry, prose, reviews, critical articles and translations have appeared in the New York Times Book Review, The New Yorker, Time, The New Republic, The Village Voice, The Jerusalem Post, Grand Street, Conjunctions, Sulfur, The Nation, Middle East Report, Afterimage, Parnassus, City Lights Review, Review of Jewish Social Studies, The Review of Contemporary Fiction, The Michigan Quarterly, Caliban, Paper Air, Paintbrush, Mediterraneans, and various other publications.

He is currently a professor in the English Department at the CUNY Graduate Center; and in the MFA Program in Creative Writing & Translation and the Department of Classical, Middle Eastern & Asian Languages & Cultures at Queens College.

In February 2024, he published an article against the Gaza genocide.

== Personal life ==
Alcalay's parents are Sephardi Jews who immigrated to Boston from Belgrade, Serbia, in what was then Yugoslavia. His Sephardi ancestors were originally from Spain. His father is the abstract expressionist painter Albert Alcalay.

He corresponded with the Moroccan activist Abraham Serfaty.

== Selected publications ==
- Preface, Stars Seen in Person: Selected Journals of John Wieners by John Wieners, edited by Michael Seth Stewart (City Lights, 2015)
- "Introductory comments on the occasion of Amiri Baraka's talk, 'Charles Olson and Sun Ra.' Fourth Annual Charles Olson Memorial Lecture. Cape Ann Museum, Gloucester, MA. 19 October 2013." in Letters for Olson, edited by Benjamin Hollander (Spuyten Duyvil Publishing, 2016) ISBN 978-1941550861
- Contributor, Homage to Etel Adnan edited by Lindsey Boldt, Steve Dickison and Samantha Giles (Post-Apollo Press, 2012)
- a little history (re:public / UpSet Press, 2012) ISBN 978-0976014287
- neither wit nor gold (Ugly Duckling Presse, 2011) ISBN 978-1-933254-84-5
- Islanders (City Lights Publishers, 2010) ISBN 978-0-87286-506-8
- Poetry, Politics & Translation: American Isolation and the Middle East (Palm Press, 2003) Based on a talk sponsored by the Cornell Forum for Justice and Peace in the series Critical Perspectives on the War on Terror
- from the warring factions (Beyond Baroque, 2002; re:public / UpSet Press, 2012), a book-length poem dedicated to the Bosnian town of Srebrenica
- Memories of Our Future: Selected Essays, 1982-1999 with Juan Goytisolo (City Lights, 1999)
- After Jews and Arabs: Remaking Levantine Culture (University of Minnesota Press, 1993) Chosen as one of the year's top 25 books by The Village Voice and named one of 1993's notable books by The Independent in London
- the cairo notebooks (Singing Horse Press, 1993) some of the earlier published poems

=== Translations ===
- Outcast, a novel by Shimon Ballas, translated from Hebrew with Oz Shelach (City Lights Press, 2007).
- Nine Alexandrias by Semezdin Mehmedinović, translated from Bosnian (City Lights, 2003)
- Sarajevo Blues by the Bosnian poet Semezdin Mehmedinović (City Lights, 1998)
- Keys to the Garden: New Israeli Writing (City Lights, 1996)

=== As editor ===
- Lost & Found: The CUNY Poetics Document Initiative (CUNY Center for the Humanities, 2010–present), as General Editor
  - For this work, Alcalay is recipient of the 2017 American Book Award
- Robert Duncan in San Francisco by Michael Rumaker, co-edited with Megan Paslawski (City Lights, 2013)
- To look at the sea is to become what one is: An Etel Adnan Reader by Etel Adnan, co-edited with Thom Donovan and Brandon Shimoda (Nightboat Books, 2014)
- Portraits of Sarajevo by Zlatko Dizdarević, translated by Midhat Ridjanović (Fromm, 1995)
- Sarajevo: A War Journal by Zlatko Dizdarević, translated by Anselm Hollo (Henry Holt, 1994)
