= John Vlahides =

John Vlahides is a professional travel journalist, creative producer, television host, and classical musician. Vlahides co-hosted and co-produced the travel TV series Lonely Planet: Roads Less Travelled, which aired internationally beginning in 2009 on National Geographic Adventure, and in 2012 on the Travel Channel. For this unscripted adventure travel series, Vlahides hosted the pilot in Morocco and the first season's closing episode in Madagascar, where he cracked a rib wrestling a bull for the camera. He also sings tenor with the Grammy-winning San Francisco Symphony Chorus.

== Education and publications ==
John received a B.A. from Binghamton University and an advanced degree in Classic French Cooking from École de Cuisine La Varenne, in Paris. He is a former member of Les Clefs d'Or, the Paris-based union of the world's elite luxury-hotel concierges.

As a member of the San Francisco Symphony Chorus, he has made three musical recordings, including a recording of Mahler's Symphony No. 8, "Symphony of a Thousand," which won three Grammy Awards for Best Classical Album, Best Choral Performance, and Best Engineered Classical Album.

=== Travel writings ===
He has served as a travel expert on a variety of television shows in the San Francisco Bay Area, and his travel writing has been published in Fodor's and Lonely Planet travel guides as well as numerous magazines and newspapers, including The New York Times, the San Francisco Chronicle and The Sydney Morning Herald. He has also been the subject of a feature in Outside.

Vlahides has contributed to 11 Fodor's travel guides and has authored 20 books for Lonely Planet travel publications, primarily focused on travel in the western United States, and guides to places as diverse as the French Riviera, Morocco, and Dubai. A luxury travel expert, he has written for BBC Magazines, King Features Syndicate, Condé Nast Traveler, Hotelier International, and San Francisco magazine. For television, he co-produced a quick vacations travel segment, "One Night Stands with John Vlahides," on San Francisco's KRON4 News Weekend and appeared as a travel and food expert on television shows including ABC World News with Diane Sawyer, Food Rush (Live Well Network), The View from the Bay (KGO-TV/ABC7) and CNN Live Today (CNN). He has been frequently interviewed as a travel expert on radio stations around the world, including the Australian Broadcasting Corporation. He is co-founder of 71miles.com, a Northern California travel site, which became the foundation for Trazzler.com, a micro-blogging travel site.

=== Ambien zombie occurrence ===
In 2008, Vlahides was on a flight from London to San Francisco when, due to side-effects of the sleep aid Ambien, he taught a flight attendant how to tie a Bedouin turban using an airplane blanket and a sleepless young boy how to make a paper plane.
