= Micah Garen =

American filmmaker (born 1968)

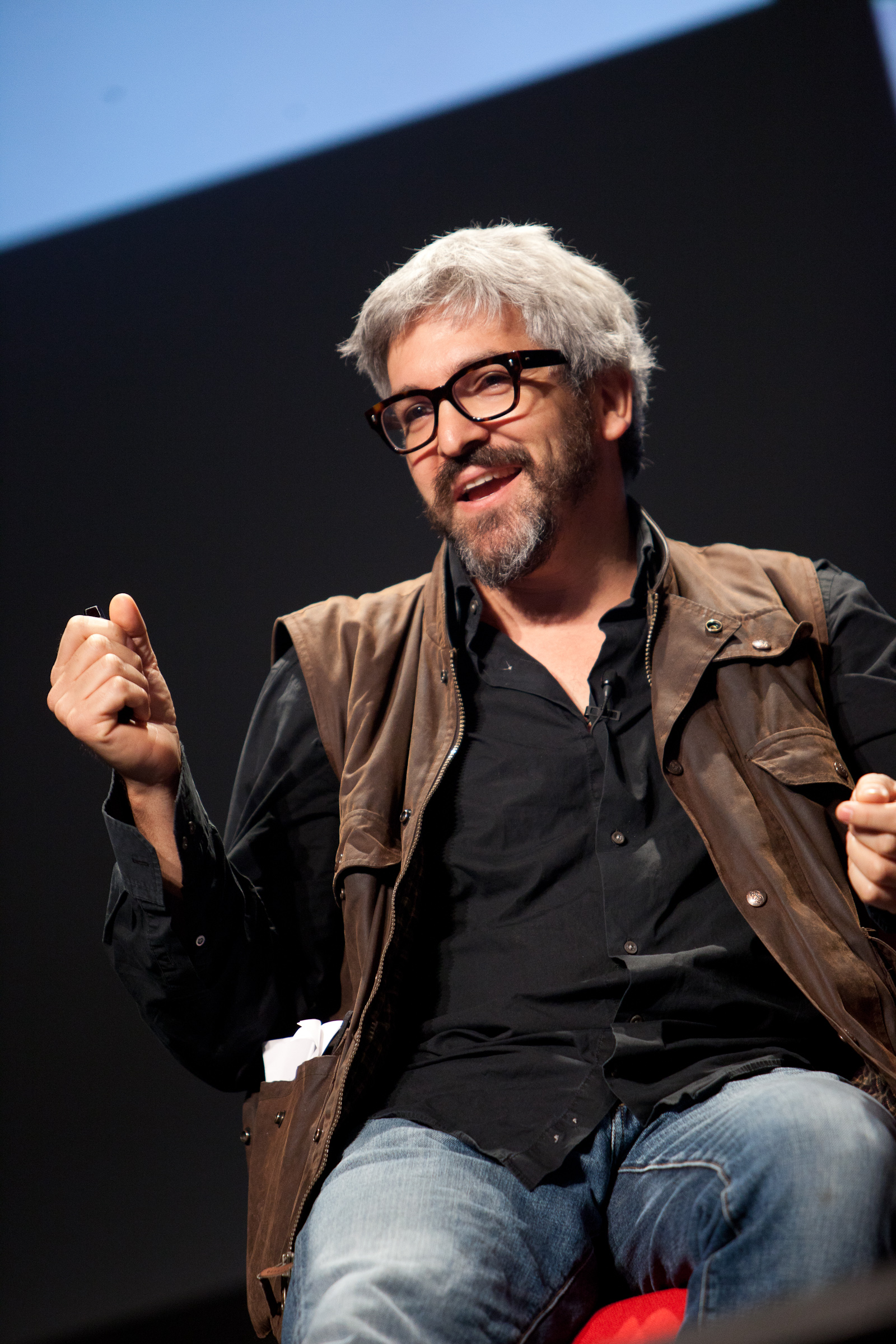
- Born: 1968 (age 57–58)
- Citizenship: United States
- Education: Cornell, Archaeology
- Occupations: Journalist, documentary filmmaker
- Notable work: American Hostage; Identity and Exile: an American's struggle with Zionism; Light on the Sea; Call Me Ehsaan
- Partner: Marie-Hélène Carleton
- Parent(s): Alan Garen, Yale professor
- Awards: Golden Nymph award, 2014; Gallery Photographica, prize-winning photograph
- Website: fourcornersmedia.net screeningroom.org

Micah Garen is an American documentary filmmaker and journalist whose work has focused on conflict zones in the Middle East and Afghanistan. He survived a kidnapping ordeal in Iraq in 2004. He wrote a book about the kidnapping, which included his confinement as well as the efforts of friends and relatives to secure his release; according to a report in Kirkus Reviews, the book was "extraordinarily compelling" and "gripping." In addition, Garen is a prize-winning photographer. He has written for Vanity Fair, Newsweek, The New York Times and other publications. Micah Garen and Marie-Helene Carleton have directed four documentaries for Al Jazeera's Correspondent series, including Identity and Exile: an American's struggle with Zionism featuring photojournalist Matthew Cassel. The film was awarded the top Golden Nymph prize at the Monte Carlo Television Festival in 2014. Garen has made a number of short documentaries, including one describing the lives of Egyptian women during the political upheavals in 2011 one on an American airman killed in Afghanistan and one on refugees fleeing Turkey to Greece by boat. With Marie-Hélène Carleton, Garen is working on a feature documentary from Iraq entitled The Road to Nasiriyah which was selected for Film Independent's inaugural documentary lab in 2011. Garen founded ScreeningRoom in 2015, an online community for filmmakers with tools including collaborative feedback on cuts, festival submissions and film grants.

== Kidnapping ordeal ==
Garen spent months in Iraq documenting the "systematic dismantling" of the nation's cultural and archaeological legacy, according to one report. On August 13, 2004, while he was in a market taking photographs with a regular camera, Garen and his Iraqi translator, Amir Doshi, were kidnapped by Shia extremists and they were held hostage in Nasiriya in southern Iraq. On August 19, a video aired on al-Jazeera in which Garen appeared sitting on the floor in front of masked armed insurgents making demands for his release. The kidnapping story drew international media attention. During the captivity, there was a strong behind-the-scenes effort to encourage Iraqi authority figures to secure his release, partially by his partner, Marie-Helene Carleton, Garen's sister Eva Garen, as well as people within Yale University, where Garen's father is a professor. His captors eventually turned Garen and his translator over to representatives of Moqtada al-Sadr in Nasiriya, unharmed, on August 22, 2004. He said he was very thankful to the cleric and his aides for their efforts at getting him released. After being released, he said he wanted to stay in Iraq to continue with his documentary project.

A week before his kidnapping, Garen and Doshi investigated Italian army reports of a car bomb in Nasiriyah that had been shot at in Nasiriyah and exploded during fighting between the Medhi Army and the Italian military. They found that the reported car bomb was not a car bomb, but an ambulance with five civilians who had been killed, including a pregnant woman who was being taken to a hospital north of the city. Garen and Doshi conducted interviews with the ambulance driver who survived and the hospital that dispatched the ambulance, as well as filmed the bodies in the morgue, and the remains of the ambulance on the bridge. They gave parts of their footage to an Italian TV channel staying on the Italian base in Nasiriyah, as the TV station crew was unable to travel into Nasiriyah and investigate themselves. Italian television aired the story and it caused a huge uproar, as it was the first time the Italian military had been accused of wrongdoing in Iraq. General Dalzini denied the Italian military had shot an ambulance. Immediately following, Garen and Doshi were interrogated for many hours by the Italian military. Garen left the Italian military base, where he had been staying, for Baghdad. Two years after the incident, three soldiers were indicted for shooting at the ambulance, the first time Italian soldiers had been indicted for a crime during the Iraq war.

== Publications ==
- Micah Garen and Marie-Hélène Carlton, American Hostage: A Memoir of a Journalist Kidnapped in Iraq and the Remarkable Battle to Win His Release. New York: Simon & Schuster, 2005. ISBN 0743276604 (hardback). New York: Simon & Schuster, 2007. ISBN 1416586318 (paperback).
- "The Looting of the Iraq Museum, Baghdad: The Lost Legacy of Ancient Mesopotamia" Harry N. Abrams, 2005. ISBN 0810958724

== Filmography ==
- Death in the Family
- Light on the Sea
- Off the Rails
- Who Owns Yoga
- Once Upon a Time in Sarajevo
- Identity & Exile
- Call Me Ehsaan
- Fahrenheit 911 (filmed Christmas Eve raid scene)

== Awards ==
- Winner of the Golden Nymph for Best News Documentary at the 2014 Festival de Television de Monte Carlo
- Finalist New York Festivals History and Society for Al Jazeera Correspondent Film Off the Rails: A Journey through Japan
- 2009 Webby Honoree Deep Divide
- 2014 Webby Honoree The Daily Struggle of Lebanon's One Million Syrian Refugees
- First Place Gallery Photographica competition 2012
