= Los Microwaves =

American musical group

Los Microwaves was a synthesizer driven pop, techno-punk new wave trio formed in San Jose, California in 1978. The band consisted of Meg Brazill (vocals, bass, synthesizers), David Javelosa (vocals, synthesizers), and Todd “Rosa” Rosencrans (drums, electronic percussion, bass). The band released their first album, recorded in 1981, "Life After Breakfast." The band toured in support of the album until playing their last show at Danceteria in New York City in March 1983. Their album was remastered and re-released in 2013. In addition to the album, the band release several singles. And as a single artist, Javelosa issued several other recordings frequently under the moniker of David Microwave, frequently backed by other players referred to as Los otros Microwaves. The band did a 25-year reunion concert in Woodstock, Vermont August 13, 2005. Rosencrans died in 2010. Meg Brazill died from a rare autoimmune disease in Boston, Massachusetts on December 16, 2021, at the age of 68.

The second LP "The Birth of Techno" was released in 2021 just prior to Meg Brazill's death. This was a collection of unreleased studio tracks including remixed versions of Silent Screamers and I Can't Say. The B side is a collection of live songs from various performances, some of which have appeared on compilations. The LP was released by their original independent label Hyperspace Communications as a limited edition in red vinyl. Distributors include San Francisco label Dark Entries.

Posh Boy Records included Time To Get Up on their 1993 release "The Posh Boy Story (More Or Less)", the 2011 "Bay Area Retrograde (BART) Volume 1" compilation, rereleased as a package in 2014, and the 2012 "STFU SF Punk Reunion 2012" among other compilation releases.

== Singles ==
- Silent Screamers/I Can't Say
- Radio Heart/Coast To Coast
- Time To Get Up/TV In My Eye
- What's That Got To Do With Loving You
- I Don't Want To Hold You/Forever
