= The Cubby Creatures =

American musical group

The Cubby Creatures are the musical arm of The Cubby, a San Francisco-based art collective practicing awareness of the Cubby, the collective's art-based philosophy of living. One of their mottos is "Revolution through inspired living."

== Biography ==
The Cubby Creatures were born out of San Francisco's Mission District in 1997, the musical arm of artist collective the Cubby. Jol Devitro née Joel Perez (guitars, vocals) and Brian Weaver (bass, vocals) formed the group, and the band's first lineup featured Emily Limón née Davis (violin), Karl Soehnlein (now writer K.M. Soehnlein) (clarinet), and Matt Mahnke (drums and samples). The lineup later included Jason Gonzales (drums) and Bill Fisher (keyboards, vocals).

The band played its first show at Artists' Television Access in San Francisco (Dec. 7, 1997) and continued to play out in various clubs and galleries in the Bay Area, as well as touching down sporadically in other parts of California, through 2006. In 2000 they appeared in New York City as part of CMJ's annual marathon.

They began publishing their zine The Cubby Missalette in 1997. It continues to be published to this day.

They created the Web site cubby.net in 1998. As of 2011, the site houses Cubby Control Records, the label launched by Brian Weaver. The Cubby Creatures' catalog is available there, along with those of Cubby friends Reptiel, Thee Druggles, Blac Mäjik, and Cubby Creatures progenitor Coolidge, as well as Weaver's "Embryo Compilations."

In 1998 the band produced and performed its original rock opera The World of Tina and followed it up with 2000's indie-rock variety show A Telethon for the Benefit of Suzie. In 2005 they premiered Jesus Christ, You're Crazy, another rock opera.

The Cubby Creatures, along with Arianne Vasquez, also produced Cubbyvision for San Francisco public access channel 29 from 2000 to 2002. Members of the band appeared frequently amongst a cast of recurring characters that included Huck Forest, Mr. Fantastic, the Reverend Myrtle Motivation (played by real-life Cubby chaplain Trismegista Taylor), Rhoda "the apocryphal sister of the Virgin Mary" and Kathy Barra (title character of the 2001 Cubby Creatures EP "Who Remembers Kathy Barra?", brought to life here by John Vlahides).

== Recordings ==
The recorded output of the Cubby Creatures includes:

- A Very Cubby Christmas (1997), a self-released audio collage.
- The Blessed Invention (2000), their first full-length album, self-released.
- Who Remembers Kathy Barra? (2001), an EP offered on CD and 10-inch vinyl that appeared on San Francisco's Rodent Records.
- Three Sides of Cubby (2002), a 7-inch vinyl record, also on the Rodent Records label.
- After the Deprogramming (2005), the band's second full-length album, recorded, engineered and released by Rodent Records.

== Discography ==
=== Albums ===
- Jesus Christ, You’re Crazy (2017)
- After the Deprogramming (2005)
- Blessed Invention (2000)

=== EPs ===
- Who Remembers Kathy Barra? (2001)
- Make Your Own Song (2001 and ongoing online)
- A Very Cubby Christmas (1997)

=== Singles ===
- Three Sides of Cubby (2002)

=== Compilations ===
- Decade of Drugs: A Rodent Records Compilation (2006)
- Embryo 4: Homemade Music by Bay Area Musicians (2006)
- the embryo compilation:03 adventures in homemade music (2001)
- embryo.2 adventures in home made music (1999)
- Satanic Embryo 4-track Adventure (1997)
