= Negative pH (band) =

American electronic music band

- Negative pH "OVRMND"

Background information
- Origin: Oakland, California
- Genres: Drum and bass Industrial music Electronic music
- Instruments: software synthesis, Propellerhead's Reason, Sony ACID, Ableton live
- Years active: 1999-present
- Members: Joshua John Fanene (keyboardist, composer); Micheal Bailey (keyboardist, composer)
- Website: http://www.negativeph.com

Negative pH is an electronic music band from Oakland, California, that formed in 2000. The two band members met through Mp3.com in mid-1999. Joshua Fanene and Micheal Bailey co-write the band's songs with influences including Nine Inch Nails, Pendulum, Ennio Morricone, Ozzy Osbourne, Pitchshifter, and Aphex Twin. The band has four albums including liminal space, which was self-released in 2004, OVRMND, 201X and 201Y. They have been featured in both local and national publications like Hyperactive Magazine issue #7.

== Band members ==
- Joshua John Fanene: keyboards, Musical Instrument Digital Interface sequencing, spoken word, chorus, guitar
- Micheal Bailey: keyboards, Musical Instrument Digital Interface sequencing, chorus

== Discography ==
- Scribe Machine - Fragile Maxi-Single [Remix] (2003)
- The UNLV Polar Bear Club - Support Your F***'n Local Scene Compilation [Propaganda] (2004)
- Negative pH - liminal space (2005)
- Kid Deposit Triumph - Our Peace Will Destroy Many [Hidden Track Remix] (2006)
- Negative pH - OVRMND (2009)
- Shatterance - Hold Your Tongue and Say Apple - Therapy [Hidden Track Remix] (2009)
- A.P.B. -- Realtime Media, and Electronic Arts -- WK [In-game soundtrack] (2010)
- Negative pH - 201X (2014)
- Negative pH - 201Y (2014)
