= Young Elders =

Australian pop rock band

- Also known as: The Monicas
- Origin: Melbourne, Victoria, Australia
- Genres: Pop rock, Jangle pop, contemporary Christian
- Years active: 1982–2000
- Labels: Disctronics, Blah-Blah-Blah
- Past members: Phil Hawkins; Chris Heazlewood; Peter Heazlewood; Ross Jackson; Paul Taylor

Young Elders were an Australian pop rock band formed in 1982. The band released an extended play, Fly Monica Fly, in 1993, and the lead track was adopted by the tennis player, Monica Seles. In 1999 the group, renamed as The Monicas, released a studio album, Celebration, but disbanded in 2000.

== History ==
Young Elders were formed in Melbourne in 1982 by Phil Hawkins, Chris Heazlewood, Peter Heazlewood and Ross Jackson. For the next eight years they played largely in contemporary Christian music circles. They performed at the National Christian Youth Convention in Ballarat in 1987 and were a main-stage artist at Black Stump Music and Arts Festival in 1990. Young Elders crossed over into the secular live music scene in Melbourne in 1991 when they won a round of the 3RRR Reel-to-Real competition with the song "Real Town". In November that year Michael Parisi, later head of Warner Music Australia and Mushroom Records, described it as a "satisfactory cross between anything Kiwi and XTC".

The band were assisted by former Skyhooks bass player Greg Macainsh to record its 1993 four-track extended play, Fly Monica Fly. The Melbourne Age noted its "sure-handed guitar pop" and "pleasingly bitter-sweet lyrics" and music paper Inpress noted its "magnificent bright catchy pop songs". The title track, "Fly Monica Fly", was written by Peter Heazlewood for a girlfriend in distress. It came to the attention of prominent tennis player, Monica Seles, who was recovering from her 1993 stabbing. Seles stated "I received this at a pretty tough time in my life and it was very inspirational and I played it a lot". At the conclusion of the Australian Open in January 1996, Seles met the band which played her a personal rendition. Their meeting was subsequently broadcast by ESPN.

In 1999, the band changed its name to The Monicas and released Celebration, with Rolling Stone (Australian edition) noting its "heart-on-sleeve lyrics" and "acoustic-bent pop" The band, described as "one of the most enduring Christian bands in the country" played its final gig at Melbourne's Continental Café in May 2000.

== Members ==
- Phil Hawkins – guitar, vocals (1982–2000)
- Chris Heazlewood – bass, vocals (1982–1988)
- Peter Heazlewood – lead vocals (1982–2000)
- Ross Jackson – drums (1982–2000)
- Paul Taylor – bass, vocals (1985–2000)

== Discography ==
- Fly Monica Fly (EP, 1993) Disctronics/Studio 52 52CD058
- Celebration (1999) Blah-Blah-Blah Records BBB0134 (as The Monicas)

Featured Tracks on compilations

- "Flags of Metal" on Nu-Music Sampler Series 3 (Studio 52 records) (1991)
- "Fly Monica Fly" on Nu-Music Sampler Series 7 (Studio 52 records) (1997)
- "Fly Monica Fly" on The Big Backyard (1999) (as The Monicas)
