= Tsunami (California band) =

American heavy metal band

- Origin: San Jose, California, United States
- Genres: Hard rock, heavy metal
- Years active: 1983-present
- Label: Enigma Records
- Members: Maximus; Doug Denton; Kosh; Bobby Simcox; Steve Tsutsumi
- Past members: Tatsuya (Chris) Miyazaki, Tomotaka (Tom) Yamamoto, Scott Sherman, Jimmi Freeze

Tsunami is an American heavy metal band formed in San Jose, California, United States, in the early 1980s. They were originally signed to Enigma Records, which released their self-titled debut album in 1983. Their first single, "The Runaround", peaked in the Billboard Hot 100 at number 60 and was played on heavy rotation on almost 200 radio stations nationwide. The band also received radio play of several other songs from their first album such as "Fade to Black" and "Firewater".

== Early days ==
Bandmates Doug Denton, Tomotaka (Tom) Yamamoto, and Tatsuya (Chris) Miyazaki performed together throughout the Bay Area building up a local following. Bassist Maximus joined the band to help solidify the lineup for the writing and recording process of their first record, and Tsunami was born. After touring in support of their first album, Doug Denton left the band. Maximus continued on to record two more Tsunami albums, which brought Kosh, Steve Tsutsumi, and Bobby Simcox into the band.

== Music for Heroes ==
The Tsunami reunion show took place at the Music for Heroes benefit concert on September 26, 2015, in San Jose, California. It was the band's first performance with the original lead singer in 30 years.

== Discography ==
=== Singles ===
- "The Runaround" (Enigma Records, 1983)
- "Firewater" (Enigma Records, 1983)
- "Fade to Black" (Enigma Records, 1983)
- "Money" (Intercord Records, 1990)
- "Honeymoon Night" (Tsunami Records, 2004)

=== Albums ===
- Tsunami (Enigma, 1983)
- Tough Under Fire (Intercord Records, 1990)
- Stand Against the Wickedness (Tsunami Records, 2004)
