= Everyone Is Dirty =

American rock band

Background information
- Origin: Oakland, California
- Genres: rock, art rock, baroque pop, psychedelic music
- Years active: 2013–present
- Labels: Breakup Records; Donut Time Audio; Tricycle Records
- Members: Natasha Bailey; Chris Daddio; Sivan Lioncub; Stephen Wright
- Website: http://www.everyoneisdirty.com/

Everyone Is Dirty is an American rock band whose style incorporates elements of baroque pop, art rock, and psychedelic music.

== History ==
Everyone Is Dirty was formed in Oakland, California by co-songwriters Christopher Daddio (guitar, vocals) and Sivan Lioncub (lead vocals, electric violin). The band solidified in 2013 with the addition of Tyler English (bass guitar, pedal steel guitar) and Tony T. Sales (drums), and their debut album, Dying Is Fun, was released in 2014 on Tricycle Records. During 2015, Lioncub endured a lengthy hospital stay due to acute liver failure brought on by an allergy to Augmentin, and her experience informed the songs on their second album, My Neon's Dead, released in 2017 on the Donut Time Audio label. Sales left the group later that year, and was replaced on drums by Jake Kopulsky. Another lineup change occurred during 2020 when English and Kopulsky were replaced by Natasha Bailey (drums) and Stephen Wright (bass guitar).

The band's most recent release is 2023's Caramels for Grandpa, which was co-produced by Eric Drew Feldman (Captain Beefheart, PJ Harvey, Frank Black). The album is an homage to Lioncub's late grandfather, Henry Drejer, who was a Holocaust survivor.

== Band members ==
- Natasha Bailey ― drums
- Chris Daddio ― guitar, vocals
- Sivan Lioncub ― lead vocals, electric violin
- Stephen "Stevo" Wright ― bass guitar

== Former members ==
- Tyler English ― bass guitar, pedal steel guitar (2013–2020)
- Jake Kopulsky ― drums (2017–2020)
- Tony T. Sales ― drums (2013–2017)

== Discography ==
=== Long plays ===
- Dying Is Fun (Tricycle Records, 2014)
- My Neon's Dead (Donut Time Audio, 2017)
- Caramels for Grandpa (Donut Time Audio, 2023)

=== Singles ===
- "Mama, No!!!" (Breakup Records, 2014)
- "Banana Split" (People in a Position to Know, 2018)
