= Sentinel (band) =

American indie dream rock band

Background information
- Origin: San Francisco, California
- Genres: Rock, pop
- Years active: 2004–present
- Members: Tarabud; Dennis Bestafka
- Past members: Amalia Cole (keys); Jenna Medina (keys); David Serotkin (drums); Kevin Rothermel (drums); Billy Mowery (drums)
- Website: www.facebook.com/sentineltheband

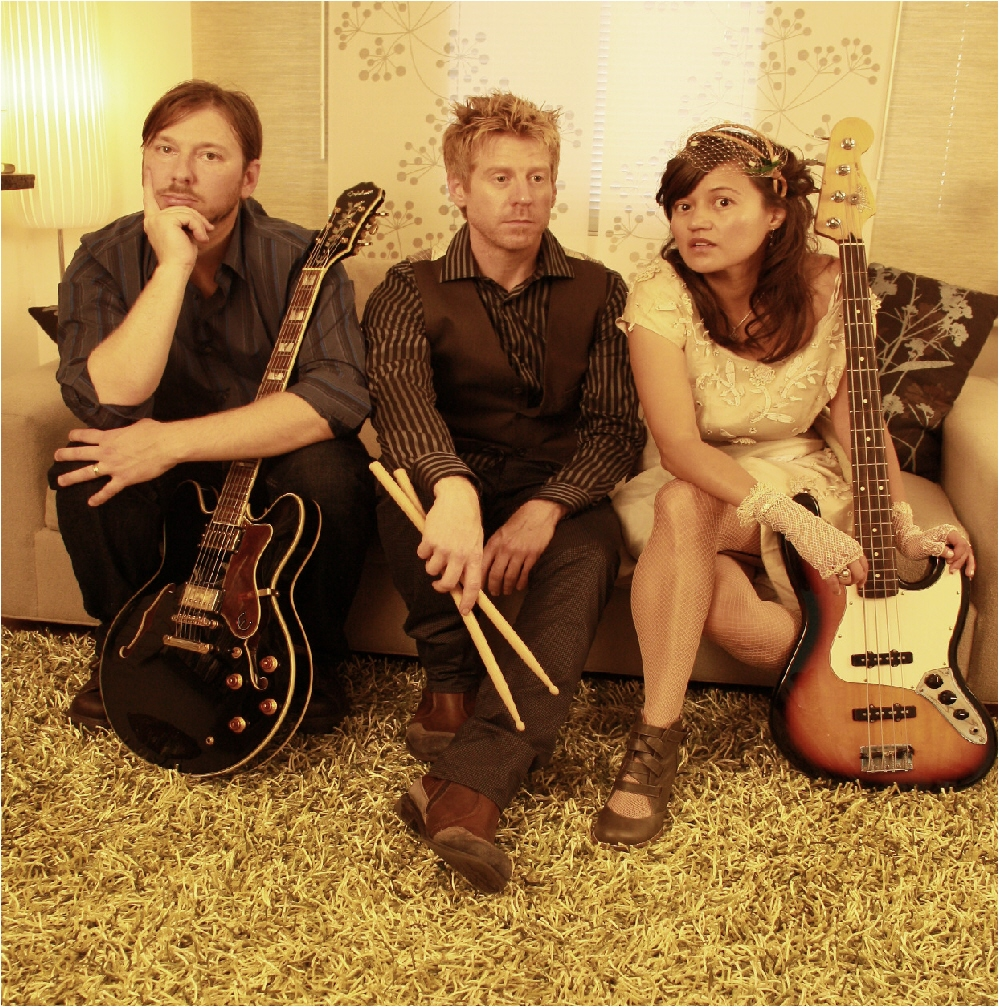
Sentinel

Sentinel is an American indie dream rock duo originating from San Francisco, California. Currently, Tarabud and Bestafka are based out of Seattle, Washington. Their music style is self-described as indie-dream pop. The band played regularly in clubs and venues around the San Francisco Bay Area. These include KZSU Stanford Live in Studio, Bottom of the Hill, The Uptown, Blakes on Telegraph, The Red Devil Lounge, 19 Broadway, the Great American Music Hall, Cafe Du Nord, Six Flags Discovery Kingdom Main Stage, The Make-Out Room and Bay Street Emeryville. They were played regularly on Bay Area radio stations including KITS Live105, KSAN The Bone, KALX UC Berkeley, KUSF UC San Francisco, KZSU Stanford and regularly made the list of top Bay Area local bands. In 2011, Tarabud was a top female musician for the Bay Area according to Live105 FM Music News.

== Members ==
- Tarabud - vocals, bass
- Dennis Bestafka - guitar
- Guest drummer and keyboardist

== Musical style and evolution ==
=== Influences ===
The band cites Depeche Mode, A Flock of Seagulls, Cocteau Twins, Dead Can Dance, U2, Fleetwood Mac, ABBA, Olivia Newton-John, the Beatles and Ella Fitzgerald as influences.

== Discography ==
- Sentinel (2004)
- The Singles (2005)
- Sequels & Hunches E.P. (2007)
- Kites Without Strings (2008)
- For Days Deep (2010)
- "Jet Black" (single) (2010)
- "Dark End" (single) (2011)
- "Somewhere Else" (single) (2012)
- "Somewhere Else" (extended dance remix) (2012)
- Points of Light (2015)
