= Ensemble Mik Nawooj =

The Hip-Hop Orchestra Experience
- Origin: San Francisco
- Genres: Classical, hip hop, rock, pop
- Years active: 2010-present
- Label: Golden Fetus Records
- Website: thhoe.com

The Hip-Hop Orchestra Experience aka Ensemble Mik Nawooj is a San Francisco Bay Area-based musical group that merges classical and hip hop styles. They are best known for The Great Integration, their "chamber hip hop opera."

== Members ==
Classically trained composer and pianist JooWan Kim founded Ensemble Mik Nawooj in 2005. In 2010, after 5 years of hiatus, Kim co-founded Golden Fetus Records to push the group independently.

== Acclaim ==
The Great Integration was voted the #1 R&B/Hip-Hop album of February 2010 by Pirate Cat Radio, and the group has received acclaim from jazz artist Ahmad Jamal. Voice of America internationally released their award winning documentary, Method Sampling in January, 2025. PBS ALL ARTS premiered the concert film, The Hip-Hop Orchestra Experience in March, 2025.
