= Trazzler =

Travel destination app

- Founded: 2006
- Founder: Adam Rugel, Biz Stone
- Website: trazzler.com

Trazzler is a travel destination app that specializes in unique and local destinations. The initial concept was developed by Adam Rugel and Biz Stone in 2006 at Twitter's original offices under the name "71 miles". More than 10,000 writers and photographers have contributed and more than $350,000 in freelance contracts have been issued as a result of Trazzeler's weekly writing and photography contests. Investors in the company include SV Angel, AOL Founder Steve Case, and the Twitter founders, Evan Williams, Jack Dorsey, and Biz Stone. The company's partners are the City of Chicago, Hawaii Tourism Authority, Fairmont Hotels & Resorts, Salon.com, and Air New Zealand. Trazzler is designed for use on the iOS, Android, and Facebook.
