= Thunderegg (band) =

American rock and roll band

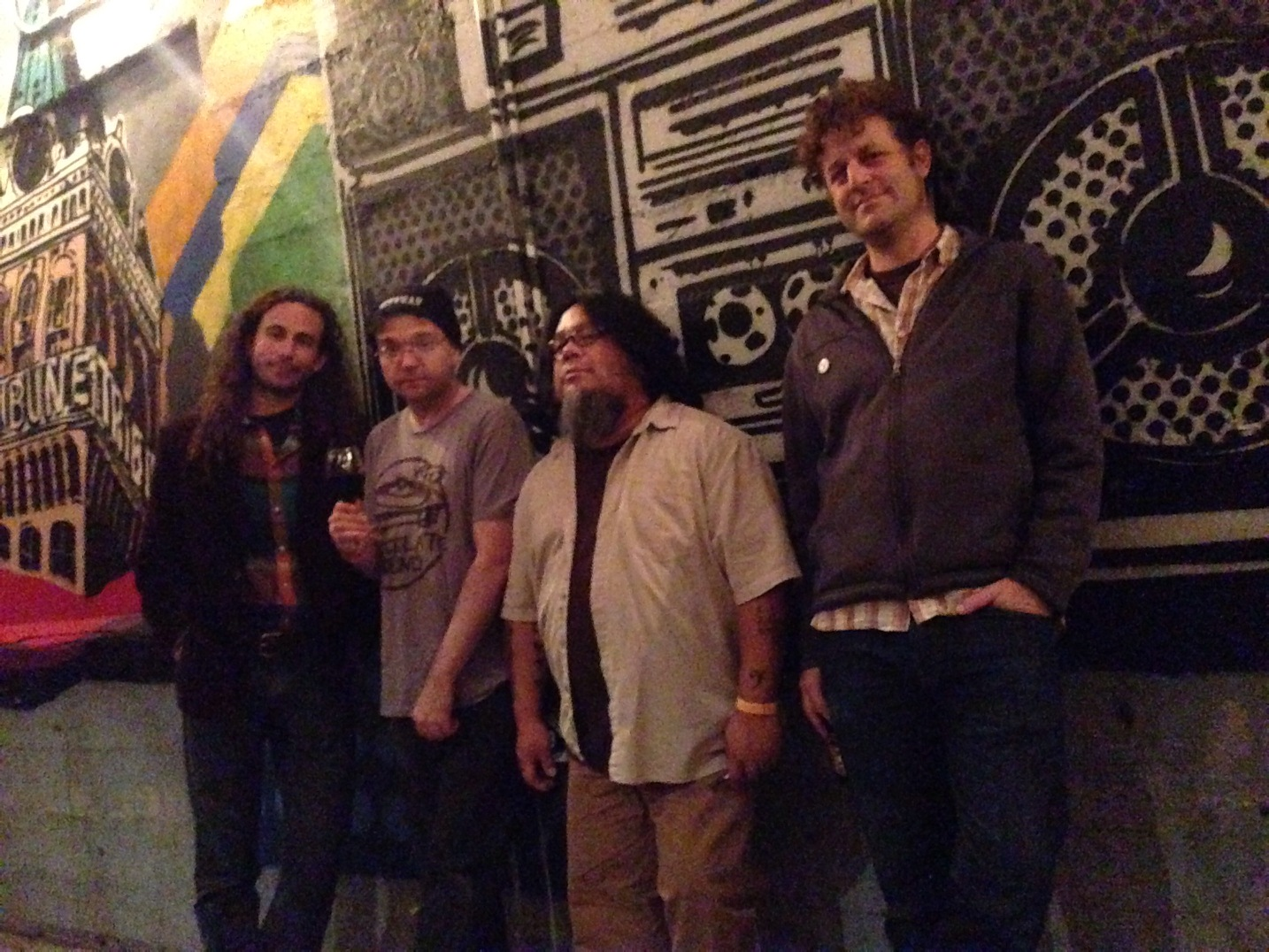
- Thunderegg at the Uptown, Oakland, CA, 9/29/2016. L-R: Reese Douglas, André Custodio, Alex Jimenez, Will Georgantas.

Background information
- Origin: New Haven, Connecticut
- Genres: lo-fi indie rock
- Years active: 1992–present
- Labels: Command-Q (1994–2005); Orange Entropy (2000-2002); HUEV (Hartford Unified Egg Vendors) (2005–2017, 2019–present); Bleeding Gold Records (2018)
- Members: Will Georgantas; Alex Jimenez; Reese Douglas; André Custodio
- Past members: Jake Fournier; Keith Woodfin; Bob Porri; Tim Kane; Jonathan Chatfield; Nathan Gohla; Ken Moon; Greg "Action" Zinman; Aileen Brophy; Russell Lord; Ken Matsuda; James Sundquist

Thunderegg is an American rock and roll band and recording project currently based in Berkeley, California, led by songwriter Will Georgantas (guitar, vocals). Its earliest incarnation was the New Haven, Connecticut, band Larry, formed in 1992 and featuring founding Thunderegg players Jake Fournier (bass) and Keith Woodfin (drums).

Between 1995 and 2004, Georgantas recorded the first eight Thunderegg albums by himself to four-track cassette in various apartments in Brooklyn, New York, and his parents' house in Princeton, New Jersey. These albums, from 1995's Universal Nut through 2004's Sweetest One, display increasingly elaborate lo-fi (or "bedroom music") arrangements, and reviewers remarked on their high lyrical quality. In January 2006, all of these recordings were collected for the anthology Open Book: The Collected Thunderegg, 1995–2004. The independently produced Open Book featured 231 mp3s on a single data CD along with a 108-page illustrated lyric book. It enjoyed a positive reception both for its large scale and its music, which was likened to rock in the vein of Guided by Voices, The Velvet Teen, and The Mountain Goats.

Thunderegg began playing and recording as a full band in 2000 after Fournier moved back east to Hartford, Connecticut, from Portland, Oregon. (The band was named after the thunderegg, the state rock of Oregon.) In 2002 a new full-band version of Georgantas's song "If I Went on a Diet" was selected for inclusion on a compilation CD produced by Jane magazine; in 2005 that song and nine others would comprise Thunderegg's first full-band album, A Very Fine Sample of What's Available at the Mine. Thunderegg's second full-band album, Line Line, would be produced and mixed by Alan Weatherhead (Sparklehorse, Cracker) in 2006 and 2007 at Sound of Music Studios in Richmond, Virginia, and released independently in September 2011. A follow-up with Weatherhead, C'mon Thunder, featuring Darren Jessee of the Ben Folds Five and Hotel Lights and recorded in 2010 and 2011, was released on May 13, 2014, to positive critical reception.

Throughout, Georgantas continued to record at home on a 424 Portastudio: In 2005 he posted a new song every week to Thunderegg's website, the best of which were collected for the CD This Week, which was self-released in early 2007. Several other albums followed, including Not What I Meant, Thunderegg's first San Francisco album, which was recommended for fans of "The Eels, Ween, The Flaming Lips, and Pulp." That album's closing track, "The Guest Star of the Rest Stop," was initially commissioned by author T Cooper for a CD accompanying his 2012 book Real Man Adventures. Cooper would also include the Line Line opener "The Scheduled Show" in the soundtrack to his 2018 documentary Man Made.

Thunderegg toured Germany in the summer of 2013 with a lineup that included Georgantas, Fournier, Moon, and Ken Matsuda (violin), and Georgantas toured the United States (with KC Turner) in the summers of 2014 and 2016. In April 2015 the band, now including Alex Jimenez (bass), Reese Douglas (guitar), and James Sundquist (drums), released the seven-inch single "Ten Sleeves"/"Big Cigarette," again recorded with Weatherhead, this time at Tiny Telephone in San Francisco.

With new drummer André Custodio, the band gelled in the Bay Area as a regularly gigging and touring four-piece band, complementing Georgantas's narrative lyrics with a sound described as "space bar rock" ("space rock, bar rock, space bar rock"). In January 2017, they returned to the studio with Weatherhead, this time at Acoustic Noise in Oakland, to record their new LP, Cosmos. It was completed at Space Bomb Studios in Richmond, Virginia, and released on both black and deluxe color vinyl by Bleeding Gold Records on May 11, 2018, accompanied by a second tour up and down California. Issue 82 of the Big Takeover, in naming it a Top 40 selection, called the album "otherworldly" and "smart and full of melodic charm," comparing it to "Teenage Fanclub, Eyelids, Bats, and Chills."

Thunderegg's next album, Helicopters, was released on February 4, 2022. Recorded remotely with Weatherhead, it includes guest appearances from Bay Area musicians Bradley Skaught, Brad Brooks, John Elliott, Julian Müller, and Megan Slankard. Again, the music was favorably received, described by one reviewer as "highly intelligent, narrative vocals over lushly arranged chamber pop rock soundscapes." Afterward, Thunderegg entered a dormant phase broken in autumn 2025 with the release of the single "Breakfast" and the announcement of a series of 30th-anniversary "De-Luxed" editions of the first four double albums, promising to transform each into "a single album that doesn't give you bonus tracks...it takes them away!"

== Discography ==
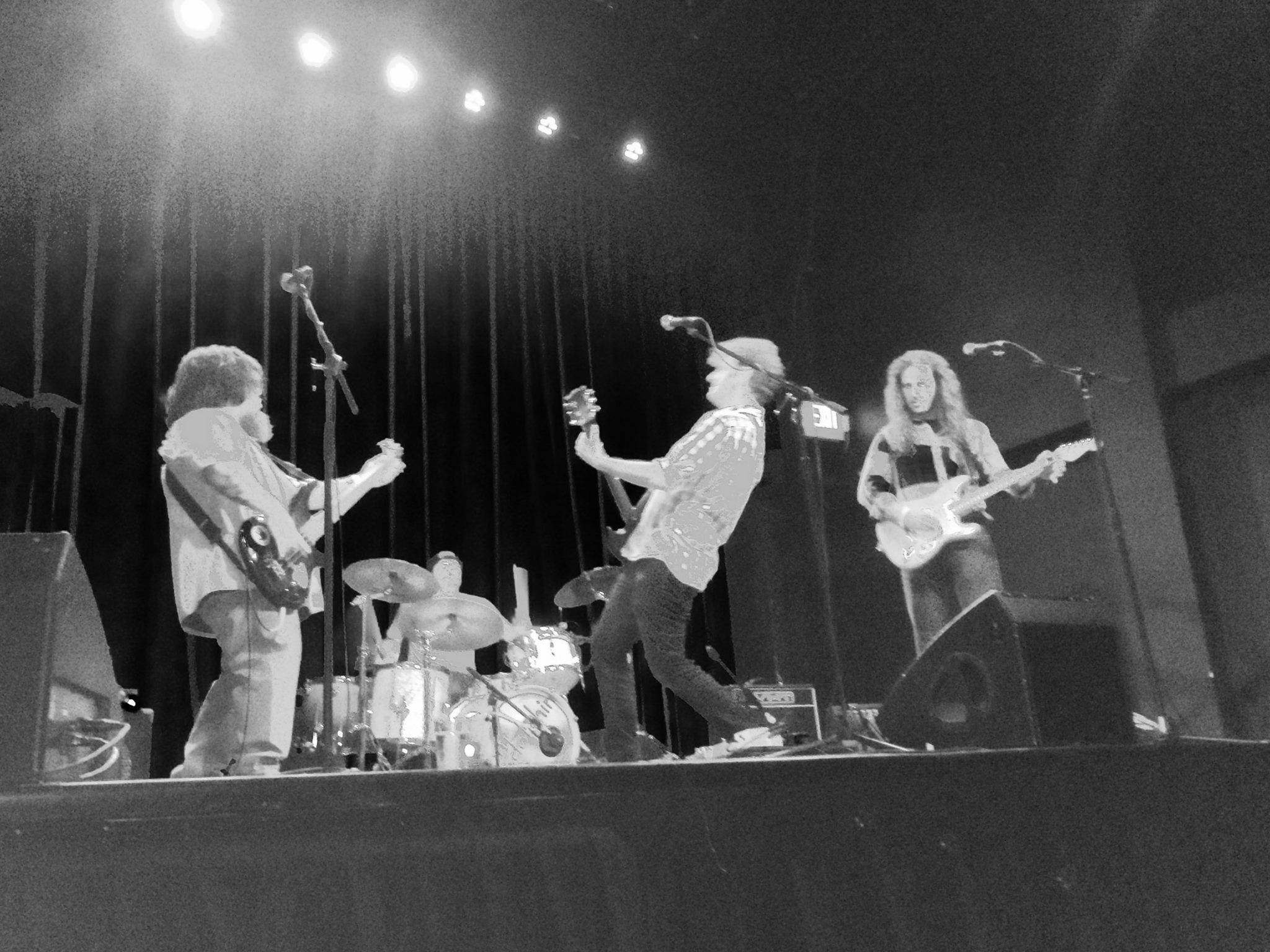
The Uptown, Oakland CA. L-R: Alex Jimenez, André Custodio, Will Georgantas, Reese Douglas

- Larry (May 1994)
- Universal Nut (Nov. 1995; "De-Luxed" Edition, Nov. 2025)
- New England Music (May 1996; "De-Luxed" Edition, May 2026)
- Personnel Envelo-file (Feb. 1997)
- Thunderegg (Nov. 1997)
- Powder to the People (Aug. 1998)
- Spent Butane: Cassette Outtakes, 1995-1998 (Sept. 1999)
- In Yanistin (Sept. 2000)
- The Envelope Pushes Back (Oct. 2000)
- Sweetest One (Oct. 2004)
- A Very Fine Sample of What's Available at the Mine (June 2005)
- Open Book: The Collected Thunderegg, 1995–2004 (Jan. 2006)
- This Week (Feb. 2007)
- Where Are the Cars (Feb. 2008)
- Platinum (Sept. 2009)
- Gazillion (March 2011)
- Line Line (Sept. 2011)
- Thunderegg History Unit Volume One (March 2012)
- Not What I Meant (Dec. 2012)
- He's Actually Pretty Cool Once You Get to Know Him: A Thunderegg Sampler, 1995-2012 (cassette; Dec. 2013)
- C'mon Thunder (May 2014)
- All Right Could Be Better EP (Nov. 2014)
- "Ten Sleeves"/"Big Cigarette" (7"; Apr. 2015)
- Cosmos (May 2018)
- Helicopters (Feb. 2022)
