= Semezdin Mehmedinović =

Bosnian writer and magazine editor (born 1960)

Semezdin Mehmedinović (born 1960 in Kiseljak, Tuzla suburbs) is a Bosnian writer, poet, and magazine editor.

== Biography ==
After studying Librarianship and Comparative Literature in Sarajevo, Mehmedinović worked as an editor for the opposition magazines for young people Lica and Valter. He published his first book of poetry Modrac in 1984, and his second book Emigrant in 1990. Shortly before the Bosnian war, in 1991, he founded the cultural magazine Fantom slobode (transl. "Phantom of Freedom"). When war broke out in 1992, Mehmedinović remained in Sarajevo with his family. The same year, he published an early version of Sarajevo Blues. Shortly thereafter, he and a group of friends founded the weekly political magazine BH Dani (transl. "Days") in 1992, to give a voice for democracy and pluralism in times of genocide.

In 1994, during the Bosnian War, Semezdin and Benjamin Filipović co-wrote and co-directed the film "Mizaldo, kraj Teatra".

In 1996, after the end of the siege of Sarajevo and the conclusion of the Bosnian war, Mehmedinović emigrated to the United States, and lived in Arlington, Virginia. Currently he lives in Sarajevo.

"Sarajevo Blues" was published in English in 1998. "Sarajevo Blues" was translated into German, Dutch, Hungarian and Turkish. In 2002, Mehmedinović published another book of poems entitled "Devet Alexandrija".

In 2009, Semezdin Mehmedinović and Miljenko Jergović co-wrote "Transatlantic Mail", a book of personal letters. Semezdin published "Soviet Computer" in March 2011, and "Self-portrait With a Messenger Bag" in June 2012. His book "Soviet Computer" was published in Hungary in 2014. His "Window Book" was published in Zagreb in August 2014, followed by “Me’med, Red Bandanna and a Snowflake” 2017, for which go was awarded the Meša Selimović Award for the best novel written in Bosnia, and Mirko Kovač Literature Award in Croatia.

== Selected works ==
- Nine Alexandrias, City Lights Publishers, 2003.
- Soviet Computer, 2011.
- Self-portrait With a Messenger Bag, 2012.
- Window Book, 2014.
- Me’med, Red Bandanna and a Snowflake, 2017
