= The Ophelias (California band) =

American psychedelic rock band

- Origin: San Francisco
- Genres: Rock, neo-psychedelia, art rock, art-punk
- Years active: 1984–1989, 2017-Present
- Labels: Rough Trade Records; Strange Weekend Records; Independent Project Records
- Past members: Leslie Medford; Samuel Babbitt; Terry von Blankers; Reuben Chandler; Geoffrey Armour; Keith Dion; Edward Benton; David Immergluck; Alain Lucchesi

The Ophelias are a psychedelic rock band led by singer-songwriter, multi-instrumentalist Leslie Medford. Medford formed the band in San Francisco in October 1984 and disbanded the quartet in September 1989. The band have been signed three times, first by Strange Weekend Records for one album, then by Rough Trade Records, for whom they produced 2 albums and an EP, and most recently by Independent Project Records, who will released the album Bare Bodkin on CD in early 2022.

The Ophelias recorded music that was described as "original" and "incredibly diverse" and "a sound that can alternate from raunchy to sweet in seconds." Leslie Medford's lyrics were "impressively literate" and J. F. Tiger described The Ophelias as "musical literature in an era practically devoid of such a thing… this band makes the listener think, and takes the listener into a secret world where other 'new music' dares not go." Medford was an unusually versatile lead vocalist, who "isn't shy about forcing his chameleon voice into Beefhearty growls, flowery Daltry-Townshend falsettos and strained Marc Bolan-David Bowie brays." They have been compared to Pink Floyd, Mark Bolan and T-Rex, Faces, The Zombies, Van der Graaf Generator, Frank Zappa, Queen and XTC, although Nils Berstein wrote "Let's just say the Ophelias have no influences."

David Fricke argued in Rolling Stone that The Ophelias were one of the only genuinely psychedelic bands of the 1980s. "In the Sixties, psychedelia wasn't just a sound; it was a state of mind. The biggest drag about Eighties psychedelia is that for every dozen bands that talk about blowing minds (reciting the proper influences, trotting out the hip covers), there are really only one or two that can blow anything other than hot air. The Ophelias, from (where else?) San Francisco, belong to that delightfully manic minority."

David Immerglück was the Ophelias lead guitarist from 1987 to 1989, the period of the band's greatest exposure. He later became a member of Counting Crows, John Hiatt, Camper van Beethoven, Cracker and others, as well as session work, studio production and music engineering.

== History ==
Virginia-born Stanford graduate, guitarist and vocalist Leslie Medford played over 150 solo gigs between 1982 and 1984 as prelude to forming The Ophelias in San Francisco in October 1984. Most notably he had provided support for Violent Femmes on their late 1983 Bay Area dates and gained high approbation from that band for his Syd Barrett covers and like-minded original material. Boston transplant Sam Babbitt was the first to join, winning out over approximately 20 guitarists who auditioned for Medford. By December bassist Terry von Blankers who was attending the San Francisco Art Institute, and California-born Florida raised drummer Rueben Chandler – both acquaintances of Babbitt’s - completed the four-piece line-up.

After submitting a 3-song rehearsal cassette, in March 1985 The Ophelias garnered the only Perfect Ten rating ever awarded by the Demo Derby column in the San Francisco Music Calendar magazine. In May 1985 The Ophelias hired the Tom Mallon Studio in San Francisco to record three songs on 8-track reel-to-reel. Their renowned version of “Mister Rabbit” was one of these, and all three would be included on The Ophelias first album.

The band’s first personnel change happened shortly after the Tom Mallon-engineered session, before the band’s first public performance. Indiana transplant Geoffrey Armour (ex-MX80 Sound) replaced Reuben Chandler on drums. Despite being San Francisco based, no Californian-born musician would join The Ophelias until Edward Benton in July 1987.

== "Mister Rabbit" ==
The Ophelias eccentric version of the anti-discrimination folk song "Mister Rabbit" appeared on SF Unscene – a 1985 compilation album. It received positive notice in Spin Magazine (May 1986) and other publications. It brought with it the first major exposure for the group, not just locally but nationally as "Mister Rabbit" was quickly embraced by university and underground radio stations around the country. The zenith of the buzz surrounding the track came in May 1986 when Spin Magazine reviewed SF Unscene and specifically "Mister Rabbit" with a double exposure photograph captioned: "Leslie Medford of The Ophelias makes like a nun."

Immerglück, who joined The Ophelias a year later, wrote that hearing "Mister Rabbit" on KALX and KUSF had caused his interest in the band. He evoked being impressed by Leslie Medford's stage presence as well as the group's performance, describing the experience as instrumental to his determination in the band's development.

== The Ophelias. ==
The band's debut album was released by Strange Weekend Records in March 1987. The Ophelias entered the KUSF Top 20 at number 4 the first week of April 1987. Dave Marrs wrote in Beef Free Magazine, "The Ophelias have delivered a tour de force with their debut. Perhaps the best independent album to come out of San Francisco in recent years, this album is brilliant." College Music Journal (New York) ran a review which ended, "What finally emerges is a mesh of the ephemeral mystery of Bolan and Donovan, with a weird, confident modernism that makes them a leading contender."

By this time, the band's live shows were already receiving rave reviews. Joni Hollar of the Daily Californian wrote:

"I've seen The Ophelias three times now, twice in the last few days, and they are just amazing. [...] The Ophelias are fortunate in several respects: the musicians do new things with the music yet retain a certain warped traditionalism, they are accomplished enough to play around with a multitude of styles, and they have a particularly strong singer/songwriter. These forces will, I think, combine fortuitously to make The Ophelias well-known beyond the local scene. Lately, the only bands I notice are the ones who don't fit into any specific genre, whose music is so original that hearing them is like hearing a completely new way of playing."

== The Night of Halloween ==
The Ophelias became one of the first signees to the US wing of Rough Trade Records and released The Night of Halloween – a 3-song EP – in August 1987. The Hard Report (an 80s era radio industry journal) wrote "Their sweeping debut album is still planted firmly in the minds of alternative programmers but it looks like they are at it again. The daring arrangements, biting acoustics and dazzling creativity continue as San Francisco's Ophelias carve a spectacular niche in the underground community."

The EP included a Kinks song, “Wicked Annabella” from The Village Green Preservation Society album. Kinks covers were relatively uncommon in the 1970s and 1980s, and several publications noted The Ophelias' version favorably. Medford has often stated that The Kinks were the band most influential on his becoming a musician.

== Oriental Head ==
Oriental Head is a 10-song LP released by Rough Trade Records in May 1988. The record received Top 35 airplay at 159 radio stations around the USA, reached the Top 10 at 48 stations, and reached Number 1 at 9 radio stations. WODU Norfolk, VA; WDCR Hanover, NH; WMMR Minneapolis, MN; WUOG Athens, GA; WRUV Burlington, VT; KTEQ Rapid City, SD; WPRB Princeton, NJ; KMUW Wichita, KS; KUSF, San Francisco, CA.

Ann Powers wrote that they "get down harder and in a more straightforward way than on their previous recordings," and the songs "recall the glory days of satin pants rock and roll".

Immerglück recalled, "When the record came out shortly thereafter, on an excellent and storied label, no less, I was just on top of the world. Honestly, it's still one of my favourite albums I’ve ever made! I really believed (and still may) we’d made the BEST album to come out of the SF Bay Area since "Surrealistic Pillow", Santana's "Abraxas", Quicksilver's "Happy Trails", Skip Spence's "Oar", or Garcia's first solo album."

== The Big O ==
A 12-song LP released in March 1989 on Rough Trade Records, The Big O received Top 35 airplay at 136 radio stations around the USA, reached the Top 10 at 29 stations, and reached Number 1 at 5 radio stations. WCWM Williamsburg, VA; WVKR Poughkeepsie, NY; WLFT East Lansing, MI; WWUH West Hartford, CT.; KCPR San Luis Obispo, CA.

The record was reviewed in both Spin and Rolling Stone, where David Fricke described the record as "futurist acid pop" and "like vintage English freak beat – early Pink Floyd, a pithier Van der Graaf Generator – laced with postpunk menace." Rock journalist Ann Powers wrote in Calendar Magazine (San Francisco): "No other San Francisco band reaches the heights of supreme imagination, ego and crunchiness required for true rock stardom as well as the Ophelias." Hard Report said, "This is one of the most original and fascinating groups the American independent scene has to offer. Every part of this music machine is working overtime and bandmaster Leslie Medford jumps in and out of this world with a shy, unsettled voice and moody abstract lyrics. From the blasting cacophony of horns to a quiet stab of silence, adventurous listening is a guarantee on an album that stretches your imagination while tempting the rest with one catchy chorus after another."

Vinyl copies of The Big O were packaged in a die-cut, round album jacket, the last occurrence of this before the music industry stopped manufacturing vinyl albums in 1990. (Ogdens' Nut Gone Flake (1968) by Small Faces, E Pluribus Funk (1971) by Grand Funk Railroad, and The Big Express (1984) by XTC, are other examples of albums released with round sleeves.)

== Bare Bodkin and Signing to Independent Project Records ==
A 15-track compilation album released in 2017 via streaming on Bandcamp and Youtube, Bare Bodkin includes material personally selected by bandleader Leslie Medford from each of the band's studio releases, in addition to five previously unreleased tracks which were recorded before the band's breakup.

About the album, Medford said, "I approached Bare Bodkin as if it would be the last will and testament of The Ophelias, as if it alone might be our legacy. [...] I use [the] four opening "new" songs to make a kind of personal statement about my feelings as to the prime aesthetic thrust of The Ophelias, musically, lyrically, visually...an extended prologue and set-up for the perhaps more-familiar numbers [.]"

Then, in 2019, The Ophelias were among the first signees to Bruce Licher’s reconstituted Independent Project Records with a vinyl and compact disc release of Bare Bodkin part of the label’s first planned moves. The Covid-19 Pandemic caused a two-year delay, but Bare Bodkin, remastered in 2021 by Philip Shaw Bova, was released on CD 25 February 2022 with artwork by Medford and IPR. A 45 RPM double LP is promised by summer 2022.

Earlier, in August 2021, to announce the label’s return, Independent Projects released the Source compilation which includes “Capital”, an unreleased rarity by The Ophelias from 1989. IPR also sponsored a new video for The Ophelias’ 1987 “The Night of Halloween” which was released 26 October 2021.

== O List! ==
On December 4, 2018 The Ophelias released O List! a live performance album with seventeen songs. These feature Leslie Medford, David Immerglück, and Terry von Blankers on all tracks, with the last two drummers, Edward Benton on twelve, and Alain Lucchesi on five tracks, respectively. O List! not only includes live versions of previously released studio tracks which often diverge wildly from the studio takes, but also has over thirty minutes of non-album tracks, including covers by Gong and David Bowie. "The Hanged Man", "Dead in the Water", "Capitol", and "Dreamer's Waltz" are all band originals which make their debut on O List! In toto listeners are treated to an hour of The Ophelias live, circa 1987–89, as the band alternates muscular, heavy psychedelic rock with interludes of gentle and sweet – this dichotomy being an Ophelias’ calling card.

== Green Girl ==
A second volume of live performances, entitled Green Girl, was released on April 23, 2019, comprising sixteen further archival recordings, this time covering the years 1984-1987 (prior to Immerglück's entry to the band). The recordings include rare examples of the band as a three-piece outfit (including a live performance with Melanie Clarin from The Donner Party/The Cat Heads on drums).

"From 1984's murky, menacing Lightning Tide; though 1985's gorgeous, poetic ballad Exeunt: Janette With Baby And Ghost; to 1987's twin renditions of The Hanged Man, structurally similar, yet wildly different in tone and color; each track on this album is a vital piece of a puzzle which has until now been impossible to complete due to the unavailability of the music.

There is a pervading sense of youthful enthusiasm throughout these tracks; just listen to Medford's gorgeous solo rendition of Nocturnal Blonde, recorded for a radio show in promotion of The Ophelias' first record---the sweetness of his voice imparts a sense of sincerity and gravitas to seemingly-nonsensical lyrics like, "We've got meaningful lawns/ rolled and written upon," urging you over and over to give it just one more listen, in the hopes that you might finally discern his coded meaning."

== Out of Thy Star ==
Following Bare Bodkin, a second compilation of studio material was released on 23 November 2020 on the Bandcamp streaming service. Out of Thy Star is seventy minutes and features twenty-one tracks. The album includes alternate versions of ten previously issued songs, as well as the previously unreleased “Capitol”, “Pretty Girl” and “The Hanged Man.” All tracks were newly remastered for the compilation.

Like Bare Bodkin, Out of Thy Star features all the band’s lineups, including the Medford-von Blankers-Armour three-piece (“Palindrome”, “In America the Other Day”); the first four-piece of Medford-Babbitt-von Blankers-Chandler (“Southeast Asian American Blues”, “Clash of the Titans”); and the final four-piece of Medford-von Blankers-Immerglück-Lucchesi (“Capitol”, “Pretty Girl”). The “classic” line-up of Medford-Immerglück-von Blankers-Benton dominates however, being featured on 14 tracks from the Oriental Head and The Big O sessions of 1988.

Out Of Thy Star‘s artwork includes a dedication to the late Scott Miller of Game Theory and The Loud Family – who was a strong advocate for the band. The two Ophelias tracks he writes about in Music: What Happened?, his book of music criticism – “Palindrome” and “Leah Hirsig” – are both included in Out Of Thy Star.

== Thus spake Psilocybin. ==
A third collection of live-performance material, Thus spake Psilocybin (small s “spake” to mimic Zarathustra’s first edition) was released on 16 May 2021. Again curated by Medford and featuring choices from his cassette collection, the 78-minutes consists largely of rehearsal tapes, including selections from 9 ex-Ophelias over its 21 tracks, though most of the material focuses on the Medford-Immergluck-vonBlankers triad, with Edward Benton and Alain Lucchesi splitting the lion’s share of the drumming. The album splits its time equally among covers, album tracks-in-progress, and unique extemporaneous pieces, all of which showcase the band's live chemistry to great effect. Over half of the material was recorded during a three-week stint at Barrington Hall (Berkeley) during December of 1987.

== Reception and influence ==
In Rock and the Pop Narcotic, his 1991 book concerning the distinction and divide between "pop" and "rock" in mid- and late- twentieth century music, critic and record label entrepreneur Joe Carducci gave The Ophelias positive mention, furthering his essential premise that popularity is no index of quality.

Furthermore, Game Theory's Scott Miller was vocal in his fandom for the band. About "Palindrome" Scott Miller wrote "This recording stands out amid those of the era—it sounds absolutely like a million bucks." Miller ranks it the fourth-best song released in 1987.

In "Music: What Happened?", along with ranking "Leah Hirsig" the third-best song of 1989, Scott Miller writes:

...Front person Leslie Medford was a multi-instrumentalist eccentric who had a wild singing style; Michael Quercio and I idolized him. An indie band on Rough Trade, the Ophs had as much pro impact as any band in late-eighties SF and their recordings have the most modern punch as any I can think of in retrospect. One secret weapon was David Immergluck, a true ace guitarist who eventually wound up in the Counting Crows—the wrong place to figure out how great he is. This is the right place;...

== Discography ==
- The Ophelias. (1987 Strange Weekend Records)
- The Night of Halloween (1987 Rough Trade)
- Oriental Head (1988 Rough Trade)
- The Big O (1989 Rough Trade)
- Bare Bodkin (2017 Browbeat, 2022 IPR)
- O List! (2018 Browbeat)
- Green Girl (2019 Browbeat)
- Out of thy Star (2020 Browbeat)
- Thus spake Psilocybin. (2021 Browbeat)

== Members ==
- Leslie Medford — lead vocals, guitars, harmonica, trumpet, keyboards, percussion (October 1984 – September 1989)
- Samuel Babbitt — guitars (October 1984 – June 1986)
- Terry von Blankers — bass, backing vocals (December 1984 – September 1989)
- Reuben Chandler — drums (December 1984 – June 1985)
- Geoffrey Armour — drums (December 1985 – June 1987)
- Keith Dion — guitars (October 1986 – September 1987)
- Edward Benton — drums, backing vocals (July 1987 – April 1989)
- David Immergluck — guitars, backing vocals, keyboards (November 1987 – September 1989)
- Alain Lucchesi — drums (May 1989 – September 1989)
