= Nils Frykdahl =

American musician

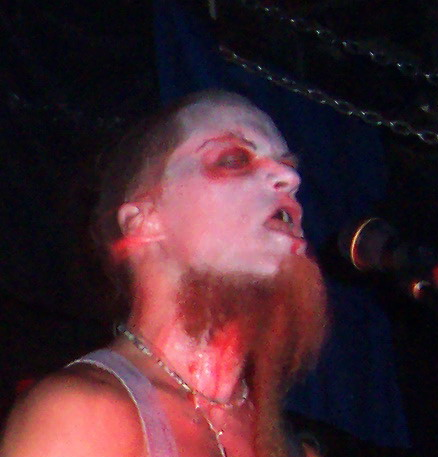
- Nils Frykdahl (2008)

Background information
- Born: Nils James Larson Frykdahl
- Origin: Oakland, California, United States
- Genres: Avant-garde rock, theatre, performance art, experimental rock, art rock
- Occupation: Musician
- Instruments: Vocals, guitar, flute, percussion, bass guitar, saxophone
- Years active: 1985–present
- Labels: The End Records; Tzadik Records; Drag City; Vaccination Records

Nils Frykdahl is an American musician, most known for his work with the bands Sleepytime Gorilla Museum, Faun Fables, and Idiot Flesh. He is also a member of the bands Free Salamander Exhibit and Darling Freakhead, and used to be a member of Charming Hostess. Along with bandmates Carla Kihlstedt and Dan Rathbun, Frykdahl is active with the performance company Ink Boat.

He performed as the voice of Tigtone in the 2014 animated short, The Begun of Tigtone. He also reprises his role as the titular character in a 2019 Adult Swim animated television series, Tigtone.

In 1989, he acquired a bachelor's degree in music from UC Berkeley.

== Discography ==
=== With Idiot Flesh ===
- Drip Demo (demo, 1986) (as Acid Rain)
- We Were All Very Worried (demo, 1987) (as Acid Rain)
- Rite of Spring (Demo 1988) (As Acid Rain)
- Tales of Instant Knowledge and Sure Death (full-length, 1990)
- The Nothing Show (full-length, 1994)
- Teen Devil/Twitch (7-inch single, 1995)
- Fancy (full-length, 1997)

=== With Faun Fables ===
- Early Song (full-length, 1999)
- Mother Twilight (full-length, 2001)
- Family Album (full-length, 2004)
- The Transit Rider (full-length, 2006)
- A Table Forgotten (EP, 2008)
- Light of a Vaster Dark (full-length, 2010)
- Born of the Sun (full-length, 2016)
- Live in Norway (full-length, 2022)
- Counterclockwise (full-length, 2025)

=== With Sleepytime Gorilla Museum ===
- Grand Opening and Closing (full-length, 2001)
- Live (full-length, 2003)
- Of Natural History (full-length, 2004)
- The Face (DVD, 2005)
- In Glorious Times (full-length, 2007)
- Of the Last Human Being (full-length, 2024)

=== With Free Salamander Exhibit ===
- Undestroyed (full-length, 2016)

=== As a guest musician ===
- Guano - Starfighter (1996)
- Barbez - Barbez (2004)
- Charming Hostess - Sarajevo Blues (2004)
- Charming Hostess - The Bowls Project CD (2010)
- Moe! Staiano's Moe!kestra! - An Inescapable Siren Therein And Other Whereabouts (2006) (plays flute on Piece No.5)
- Už Jsme Doma - Rybí tuk (Cod Liver Oil) (2007)
- Indukti - IDMEN (2009)
- Stolen Babies - "Stolen Babies" (2020)

== Filmography ==
=== Film ===
Year	Title	Role	Notes
2019	Tigtone	Tigtone (voice)	Main role
