= Species Being =

Species Being is an improvisational progressive rock band from the San Francisco Bay Area. They are considered one of the forefathers of improv progressive music. The band originally operated from 1997 to 2002, but took a fifteen-year hiatus, before signing with Rhubarb Palace Music.

== History ==
The band was started in 1997 by drummer Frank Grau (Sleepytime Gorilla Museum). The original line up consisted largely of musicians from the local space-rock group Beyond-O-Matic and other local psych-rock and jazz musicians. In 1998 the line up changed considerably, turning into a quartet featuring Mike DiPirro on bass (Free Peoples, Soulstice, Radioactive), Jai Young Kim on keyboards (Secret Chiefs 3), and guitarist Eli Good (Grassy Knoll). After the departure of DiPirro in 1999, Species Being included several new musicians to its rotating line up including bassist Kenseth Thibideau (Pinback), guitarist Mitch Cheney (Rumah Sakit), composer/keyboardist Graham Connah, and bassist Matt Lebofsky (Secret Chiefs 3, MoeTar, miRthkon). This rotation of members stuck with the band until their break up in 2002.

The group reunited as a trio in 2017. The current line up consists of Matt Lebofsky, Jai young Kim and Frank Grau. Several releases through Rhubarb Palace Music are pending.

== Releases ==
Species Being self-released its debut Yonilicious in 1998. This album is a series of 11 vignettes strewn together to make a whimsical and wild pastiche of out-rock. Stylistically reminiscent of Soft Machine, Univers Zero, and other out-rock groups, this record was distributed in the UK by ReR Megacorp, by Marquee in Japan, and through other outlets across the U.S. and Europe.

Species Being's second record, Orgone Therapy, was released in 2000 on the now defunct Innerspace Records. Much like its predecessor, it is a collage of material taken from recording sessions, this time at the Radical House studio in San Francisco. It is entirely improvised with no overdubs and instead of an out-rock style, Orgone Therapy is far more progressive rock in its approach. In 2007, former member Mitch Cheney produced a benefit CD for Children's Musical Education in St. Augustine, Florida entitled Greenness. Included on this CD is an unreleased Species Being track entitled 'Even Crappy Things Must Come To An End'. This track was taken from a live performance on WFMU 2000.

Quasar: Selections from 1997-2002 is a compilation of songs from Yonilicious and Orgone Therapy and previously unreleased material. It is the debut release for Species Being on Rhubarb Palace Music and will be available June 2017.
