= Elevate =

Elevate may refer to:

== Music ==
- Elevate (Big Time Rush album), 2011
- Elevate (Morgan Page album), 2008
- Elevate (EP), a 2013 EP by Chamillionaire
- "Elevate" (Drake song), 2018
- "Elevate", a song by Alicia Keys from the album Here
- "Elevate", a song by Born of Osiris
- "Elevate", a song by DJ Khalil from the soundtrack album Spider-Man: Into the Spider-Verse
- "Elevate", a song by Papa Roach from the album Who Do You Trust?

== Other uses ==
- Elevate, an air taxi service proposed by Uber
- Elevate Holdings, an American private air transportation company
- Elevate (organization), a youth-driven foster care program
- Elevate, the frequent-flyer program of Virgin America
- Elevate, a brain training mobile app
- Elevate, a Californian production company by Mikki Willis, most known for conspiracy videos Plandemic
- Elevate (brand), a brand of roofing, wall and lining solutions of the Holcim Group, formerly known as Firestone Building Products

== See also ==
- Elevation (disambiguation)
