= MoeTar =

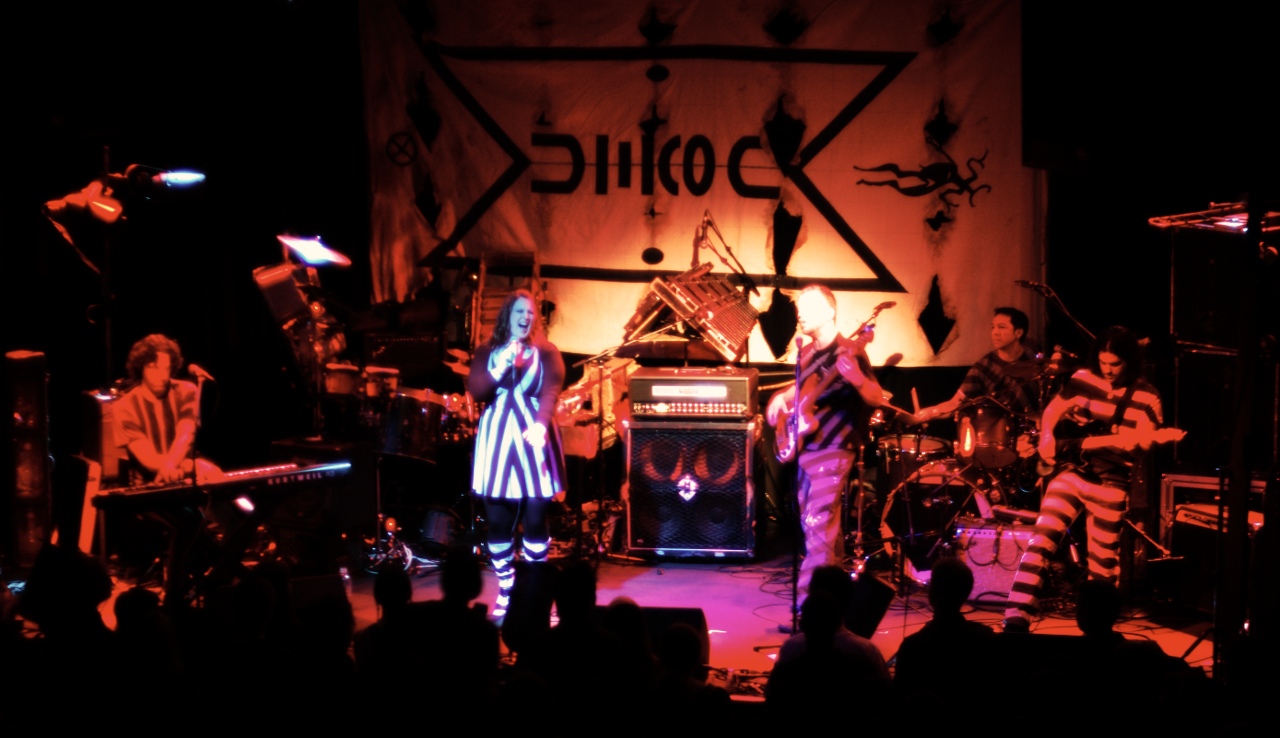
- MoeTar opens for Sleepytime Gorilla Museum at The Independent SF On 2011-04-10

Background information
- Origin: Oakland, California, U.S.
- Genres: Progressive rock, alternative rock, pop
- Years active: 2008–2018
- Members: Moorea Dickason; Tarik Ragab; Matthew Heulitt; Matt Lebofsky; David M. Flores; Jonathan Herrera
- Website: Official Site

MoeTar was an American, Bay Area, California-based rock group, founded by singer Moorea Dickason ("Moe") and bassist Tarik Ragab ("Tar"). Moorea and Tarik previously worked together in the more politically charged funk/pop band No Origin.

== History ==
Moorea and Tarik formed the band in 2008 with Matthew Heulitt (Narada Michael Walden, Zigaboo Modeliste) on guitar, David Flores (Lauryn Hill, John Santos, Carne Cruda) on drums, and Bob Crawford on keyboards. Early on Bob left the band, and was replaced by Matt Lebofsky (miRthkon, Faun Fables, Secret Chiefs 3).

With the lineup in place, the band entered a period of intense rehearsals and shows. Their first gig (May 17, 2009) was performing near the finish line at the annual Bay to Breakers race in San Francisco. They also performed at the annual Burning Man Decompression Festival, and played the opening slot at the final show of Sleepytime Gorilla Museum.

In 2010, they recorded their debut CD From These Small Seeds with engineer Dan Rathbun (of Sleepytime Gorilla Museum, Idiot Flesh). The album was self-released in July, 2010. Papa J of CalProg ranked it the number 4 best album of 2010.

In 2011, they signed to Magna Carta Records who re-released From These Small Seeds on CD in early 2012 with different artwork.

In 2013, they started recording their second CD Entropy of the Century which was released in August 2014. Jonathan Herrera (Zigaboo Modeliste, Miguel Migs, Cathedrals) helped contribute to the recording process of this record and then officially joined the band, also on keyboards.

The band officially disbanded in 2018 after releasing The Final Four EP. Moorea and Tarik formed a new band, Raze The Maze.

== Band members ==
- Moorea Dickason – vocals
- Tarik Ragab – bass, backing vocals
- Matthew Heulitt – guitar, backing vocals
- Matt Lebofsky – keyboards, backing vocals
- David M. Flores – drums
- Jonathan Herrera – keyboards (since 2014)

== Discography ==
Albums

- From These Small Seeds (2012, Magna Carta Records #MA-9111)
- Entropy of the Century (2014, Magna Carta Records #MA-9118-2)
- The Final Four (EP) (2018, self-release on Bandcamp)
