= Dren McDonald =

American musician

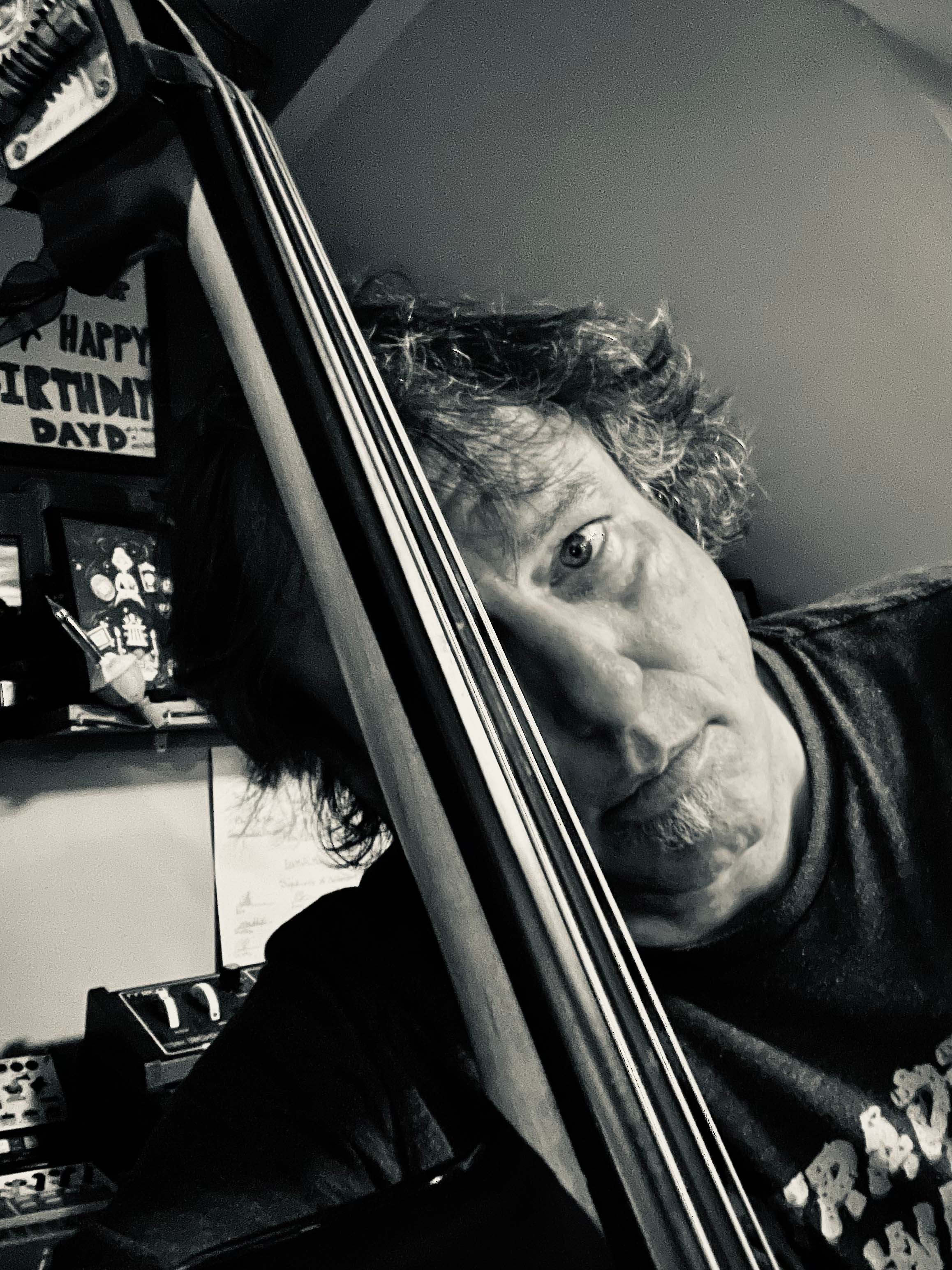
- McDonald in 2021

Background information
- Born: Richard Dren McDonald; Long Beach, California, United States
- Occupations: Composer; Arranger; Music producer; Musician
- Years active: 1994-Present
- Labels: Vaccination Records, Nerdtracks Recordings, Appearing Records
- Spouse: Lorrie Murray

Richard Dren McDonald is an American songwriter, arranger, music producer, and composer.

McDonald has composed music for video games such as Ravenwood Fair, Skulls of the Shogun, and Tom Clancy's Ghost Recon Commander. McDonald also has several music kits in Counter Strike 2, including music from Gunman Taco Truck, Death's Head Demolition, and Coffee! Kofe! Kahveh! McDonald has also released albums with several different musical projects, including two as a member of Giant Ant Farm and two as a member of Grndntl Brnds, which were released on the label he founded, Vaccination Records.

== Career ==
=== Early career ===
McDonald began his music career in 1994 with the release of Giant Ant Farm's Fortune on Vaccination Records.

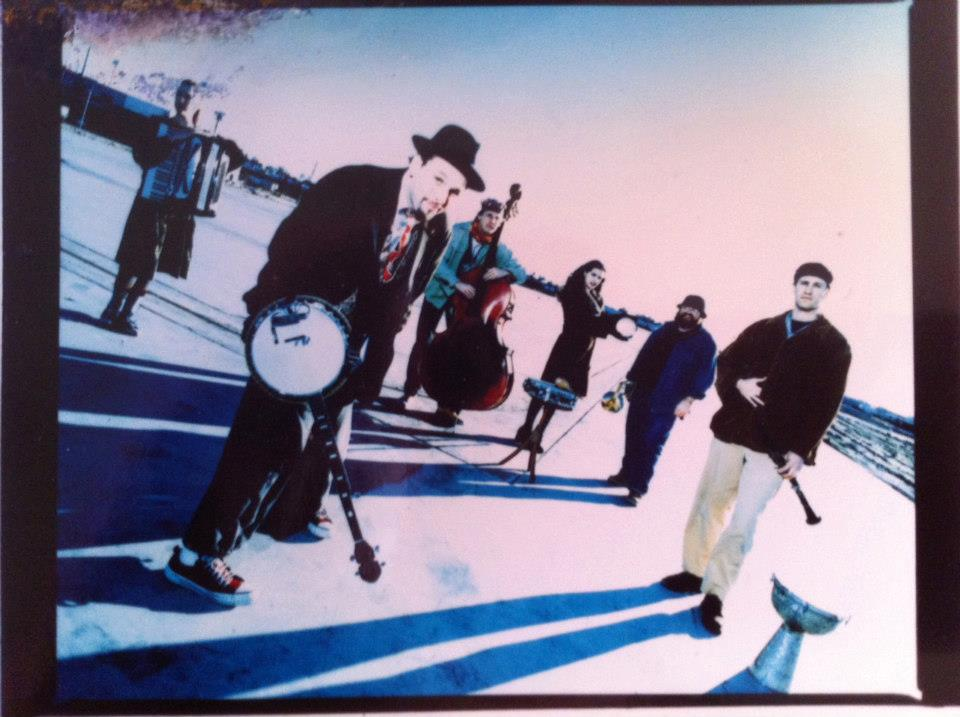
Giant Ant Farm photographed in downtown Los Angeles in 1994. Members photographed here are Dren McDonald, Diane Barkauskas, Hannes Giger, Sherri Solinger, Jerry Wheeler and Mike Flanagan.

The album was reviewed in the Los Angeles Times, with critic Mike Boehm writing "[i]n contrast to the overt expressions of anger and dread you get in most punk songs about the declining state of things, McDonald offers symbolic and metaphoric dreamscapes"

In 1995, McDonald made an appearance as a turntablist on John Cage's Europeras 3 & 4 with the Long Beach Opera on Mode Records. In 1996, Giant Ant Farm's second album, an EP titled Dressed in Milk, was released.

In 1996, McDonald also made an appearance on the compilation record, Eyesore: A Stab at The Residents (a tribute to the art collective The Residents), appearing with artists such as Primus, Cracker, Stan Ridgway, and Vaccination Records labelmates Charming Hostess, The Poxy Boggards, and The Residents themselves.

McDonald served as a stage manager at the 1997 Making Waves music festival in San Francisco, which featured multiple performers from Vaccination Records. McDonald also moderated a panel at the North by Northwest media conference and festival in 1998.

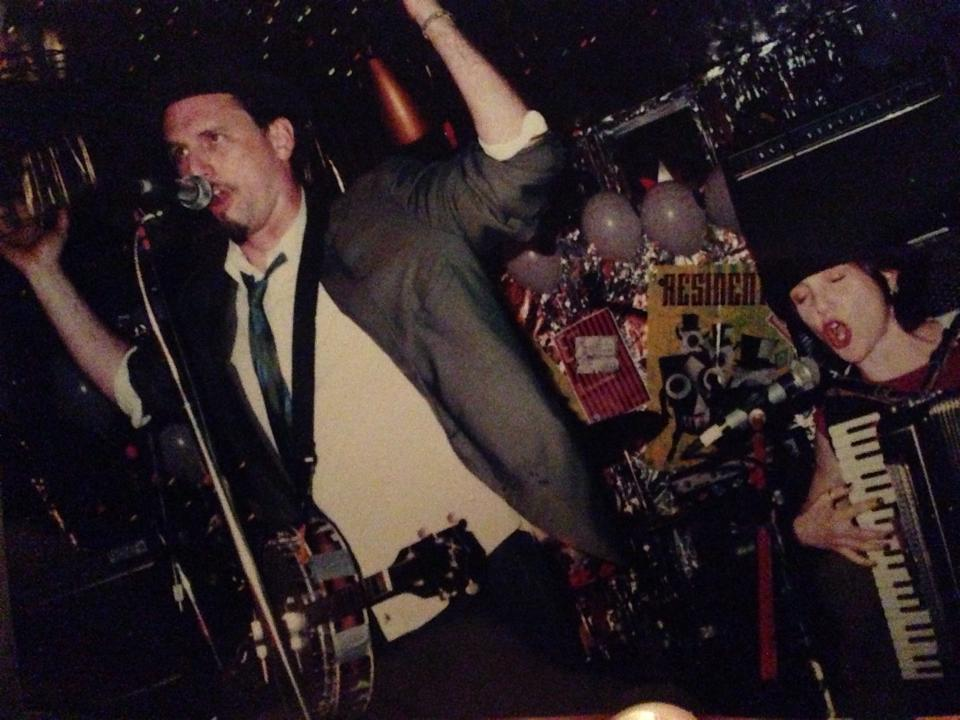
Dren McDonald and Nina Rolle of Giant Ant Farm performing at the Eyesore: A Stab at The Residents record release party at The Stork Club, Oakland, CA in 1996.

McDonald's next releases came with the band Grndntl Brnds (pronounced Grand National Brands) with Communicating for Influence (2000) and The Great Dumbening (2002). The band debuted in 1998 and often changed the second half of their name for shows. Besides McDonald, Grndntl Brnds included members of Fibulator, Little My, and Molecules. The Great Dumbening would also be the last title released by Vaccination Records.

McDonald also took over The Residents' Ralph America merchandise business and founded a new e-commerce business called Clamazon. Clamazon sold albums and music packages and included internet radio stations and a database of music credits that helped users find related music.

In the early 2000s, McDonald began to change his career and looked into working on video game music and sound.

=== Video game industry career ===
McDonald has composed music for video games such as Ravenwood Fair, Tom Clancy's Ghost Recon Commander, Skulls of the Shogun, Dangerous Dave Deluxe, and the video game adaptation of Transformers: Age of Extinction.

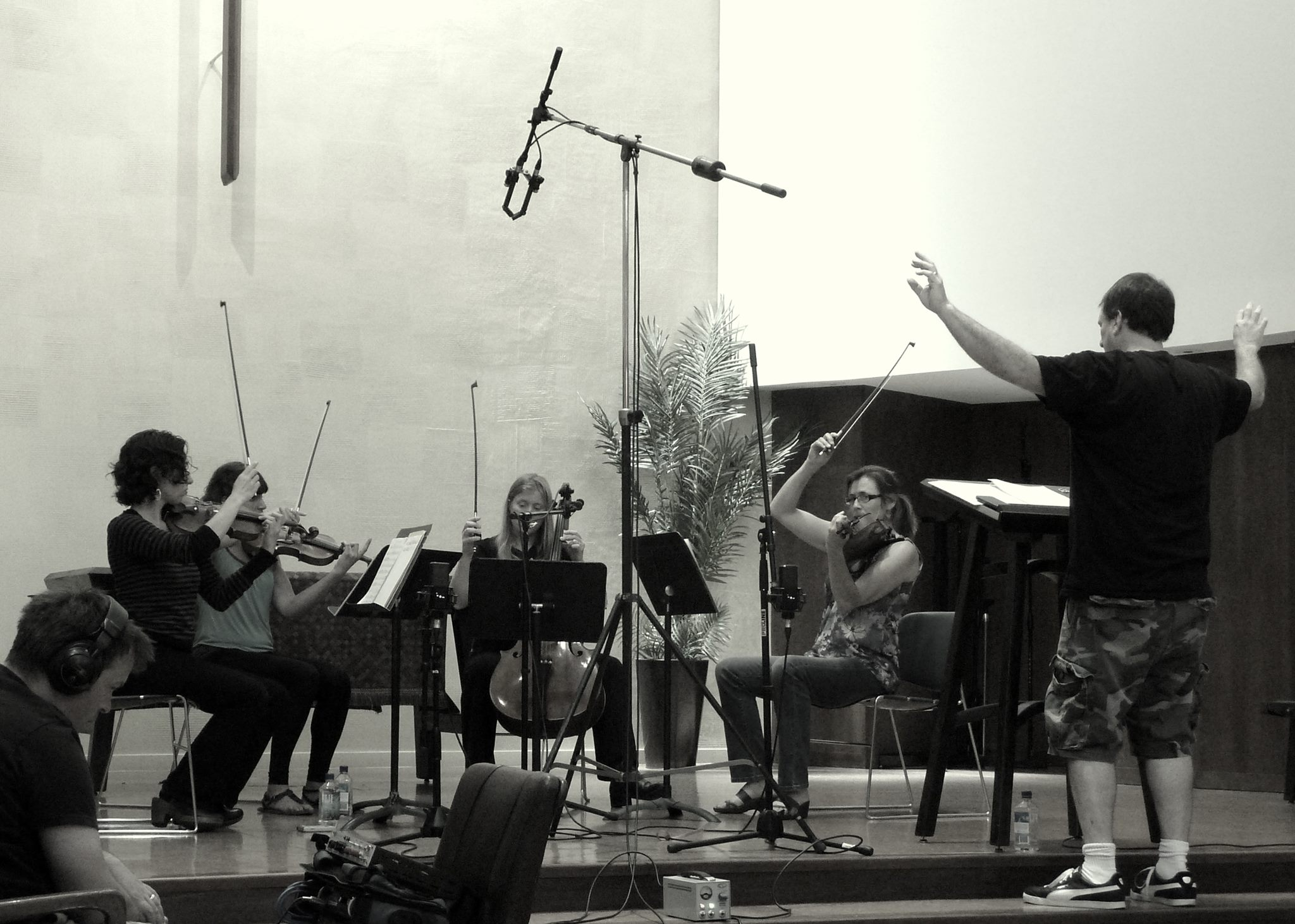
Dren McDonald conducting The String Arcade during a recording session in 2013 in Oakland, CA.

In 2014, McDonald created the musical sound design for Elevate, Apple's pick for App of the Year in 2014. That same year he also contributed to Counter-Strike: Global Offensive Music Kits and released a fundraiser album of video game music arranged for string quartet, entitled The String Arcade. The String Arcade release gave 100% of its sales and streaming revenue to Alameda Music Project (now known as Bay Area Music Project). It won an award at the Game Audio Network Guild Awards in 2015 for Best Game Music Cover/Remix.

Later that year, McDonald organized a Music in Schools fundraiser with Humble Bundle, putting together a large bundle of music and games that also went to support Alameda Music Project. The collection included The String Arcade along with releases from Jello Biafra (and three other titles from his label, Alternative Tentacles), unreleased cues from Sam Hulick's Mass Effect 3 soundtrack, soundtracks from Fez, Dear Esther, FTL, and Spelunky.

In 2015, McDonald contributed soundtracks to Pontoco's Gathering Sky. Many of the game's reviews recognized McDonald's interactive score. The score was recorded at the San Francisco Conservatory of Music, where McDonald would later teach as an adjunct professor; it was the first project recorded at SFCM's brand new Technology and Applied Composition (TAC) facilities.

In 2016, McDonald won three awards at the Game Audio Network Guild Awards for his work on Gathering Sky, namely Best Audio for an Indie Game, Best Sound Design in a Casual/Social Game, and Best Game Audio Article, Publication, or Broadcast.

That same year, McDonald appeared in the documentary Beep: A Documentary History of Game Sound which included a compendium book. He also wrote began a game project called Fire Child which remains unfinished, though a trailer for the game has been released.

That year he also began work on another game with John Romero, Gunman Taco Truck, which was designed by Romero's stepson, Donovan. The Gunman Taco Truck soundtrack used unusual recording techniques to help create the sound of a dystopian mariachi band, such as mechanical filters while recording live musicians.

McDonald released a new music kit for Counter-Strike 2, titled "Coffee! Kofé! Kahve!" (part of the Masterminds 2 box set), in August 2024. This marks his third contribution to the franchise.

He composed the soundtrack for the mixed reality (MR) and virtual reality (VR) game STAY: Forever Home, which was released in April 2025 for the Meta Quest headset featuring vocal collaboration with Sophia James and Amelie Anna.

=== Film scores ===
In 2019, McDonald scored the full-length documentary The Edge of Success, which was shown at the Cinequest Film & Creativity Festival.

=== Academia ===
McDonald was an adjunct professor in the new Technology and Applied Composition program (TAC) at the San Francisco Conservatory of Music.

McDonald has contributed to the academic publications The Game Audio Strategy Guide: A Practical Course and The Beep Book: Documenting the History of Game Sound.

== Other projects ==
McDonald composed the jingle for Instagram's Superzoom feature. In 2019, McDonald spoke on the subject of AR audio at AES, In 2020, McDonald spoke at the D.E.W. conference about AR and audio/music.

In 2022, McDonald scored and audio directed the VR animation, Mescaform Hill: The Missing Five produced by Oculus/Meta. The animated VR project was created with Quill and premiered at the Tribeca Festival in June 2022.

McDonald also scored the VR animation Perennials, which was produced by Meta and premiered at the Venice Immersive section of the Venice Film Festival in September 2023.

In February 2024, the Stranger Things VR game was released and the MR chapters of the game have music and sounds written, designed and produced by McDonald.

=== polyheDren ===
In 2020, McDonald began a music collaboration project, polyheDren, with a series of musical guests as a fundraiser for Bay Area Music Project. polyheDren's first full-length record was released in April 2022. The album was produced, mixed and written by McDonald, with each song featuring a different music collaboration. Collaborators include Josh Freese (Foo Fighters, Nine Inch Nails, Sting, Devo) and The Residents.

After working together on polyheDren, in January 2023, McDonald joined Josh Freese at the San Francisco Conservatory of Music for a 50th Anniversary concert for The Residents, along with several other guest performers including Les Claypool (Primus), David J (Bauhaus), Ego Plum, Pamela Z, and The San Francisco Girls Chorus. The concert was organized by SFCM's Edwin Outwater and the concert recording and concert video of this show was released by Cherry Red.

=== Guitar orchestra ===
In 2022, McDonald began releasing a suite of instrumental singles emulating the sound of a guitar orchestra, layering guitar parts to create this sound. A full-length album of these pieces, titled Pterous, was released in April 2023 through Appearing Records.

== Awards ==
- 1997: San Francisco Bay Guardian Best of the Bay: Best Reason to Graft a 3rd Ear to Your Forehead – Vaccination Records
- 2011: Game Audio Network Guild (GANG) Awards: Distinguished Service Award
- 2015: Game Audio Network Guild (GANG): Best Remix/Cover Song – "Grasswalk" (Plants vs. Zombies), The String Arcade
- 2016: Game Audio Network Guild (GANG): Best Game Audio Article – Audio Journals: Gathering Sky (GamaSutra)
- 2016: Game Audio Network Guild (GANG): Best Sound Design in a Casual Game – Gathering Sky
- 2016: Game Audio Network Guild (GANG): Best Indie Game Audio – Gathering Sky

== Personal life ==
Dren McDonald is married to Lorrie Murray, who is the founder of the Bay Area Music Project (BAMP). They have a daughter, Ella, and a son, Maddox.

== Discography ==
=== Giant Ant Farm ===
- Fortune (Vaccination Records, 1994, CD)
- Eyesore: A Stab at The Residents (Vaccination Records, 1996, CD – compilation)
- Dressed in Milk (Vaccination Records, 1996, CD)

=== Grndntl Brnds ===
- Communicating for Influence (Vaccination Records, 2000, CD)
- Rawk Party (Vaccination Records, 2000, CD – compilation)
- The Great Dumbening (Vaccination Records, 2002, CD)

=== polyheDren ===
- Psychic (BAMP Records, 2022, CD/digital/LP/Atmos)

=== Solo Works ===
- Original Soundtrack – Dangerous Dave in the Deserted Pirate's Hideout (Nerdtracks Recordings, 2015, CD/digital)
- Original Soundtrack – Gathering Sky (Nerdtracks Recordings, 2015, digital)
- Original Soundtrack – Gunman Taco Truck (Nerdtracks Recordings, 2017, CD/digital)
- J. (Appearing Records, 2022, digital)
- D. Part 1 (Appearing Records, 2022, digital)
- H. (Appearing Records, 2023, digital)
- Oceanic (Appearing Records, 2024)
- Stay: Forever Home Soundtrack (Appearing Records, 2025)

=== Contributor ===
- John Cage, Europeras 3 & 4 (Mode Records, 1995, CD)
- Moe!kestra!, Knormalities V. 2 Exclamatories! (DephineKnormal/Amanita, 2000, 7")
- Robot Arm, Giant (Motherf**kingjackson Recordings, 2002, CD)
- Star Stunted II, Mahogany Wood (Melodic Virtue, 2024, 10")
- The Residents: Secret Show (Live In San Francisco), Double Vinyl Edition, 2024

=== Film ===
- 2017 - Fingerprints, Composer
- 2019 - The Edge of Success, Documentary score
- 2023 - Soundtrack for Mescaform Hill: The Missing Five, Titled: A Mescaform Hill Music Story
