= Melissa Haney =

Inuk pilot from Quebec, Canada

- Born: 1981 (age 44–45)
- Citizenship: Canadian
- Occupation: Commercial pilot
- Known for: Air Inuit's first female Inuit pilot to become captain

Melissa Haney (born 1981) is an Inuk pilot from Quebec, Canada. She is noted for being the first female Inuk pilot with Air Inuit to reach the rank of captain. In 2017, the Canadian Ninety-Nines released a postage stamp in commemoration of her achievements.

== Early life ==
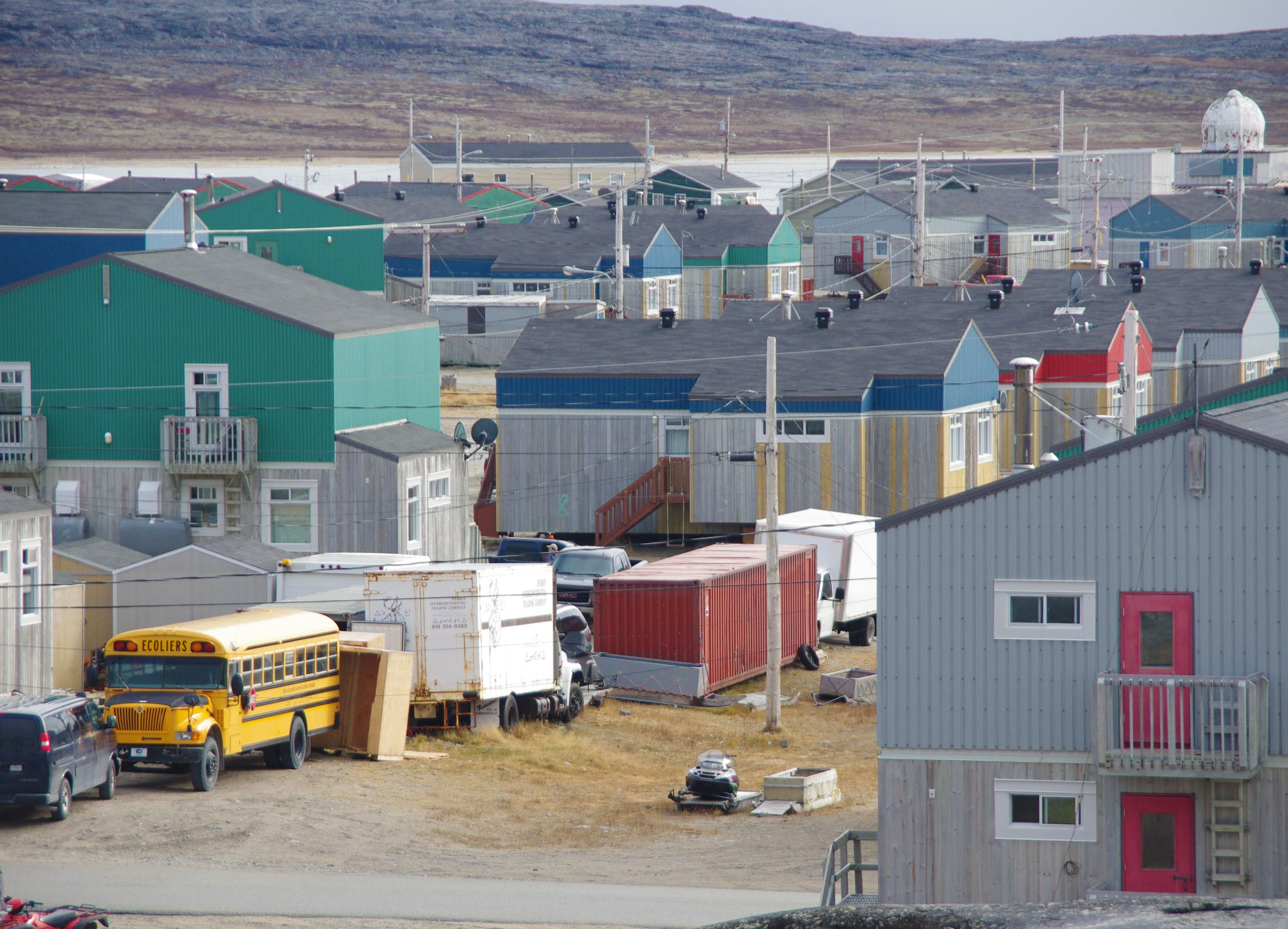
Haney's hometown of Inukjuak, in northern Quebec

Haney was born in 1981. She spent her early years in the community of Inukjuak on the shores of Hudson Bay, and as a child, Haney loved going to visit the airport. Planes were an ordinary form of transportation in Haney's community, necessary for travelling to dental and medical appointments in other communities.

When she was eight, Haney moved south to Eastern Townships with her mother, who was a teacher. Haney grew up in Eastern Townships, and finished a year of university at John Abbott College in Montreal. When she was 19, she heard that Air Inuit was looking for new employees. Haney decided it sounded interesting and would provide a chance to get closer to her northern childhood community again.

== Career ==
In 2001, Haney began working with Air Inuit as a flight attendant. She soon decided she wanted to fly planes herself. In 2003, Haney took flight lessons in Cornwall, Ontario. The following year, she completed ground school courses with Air Inuit. One of Haney's mentors has been aviator Johnny May, the first Inuk bush pilot in Nunavik. In 2004, Haney began flying Twin Otter aircraft for Air Inuit.

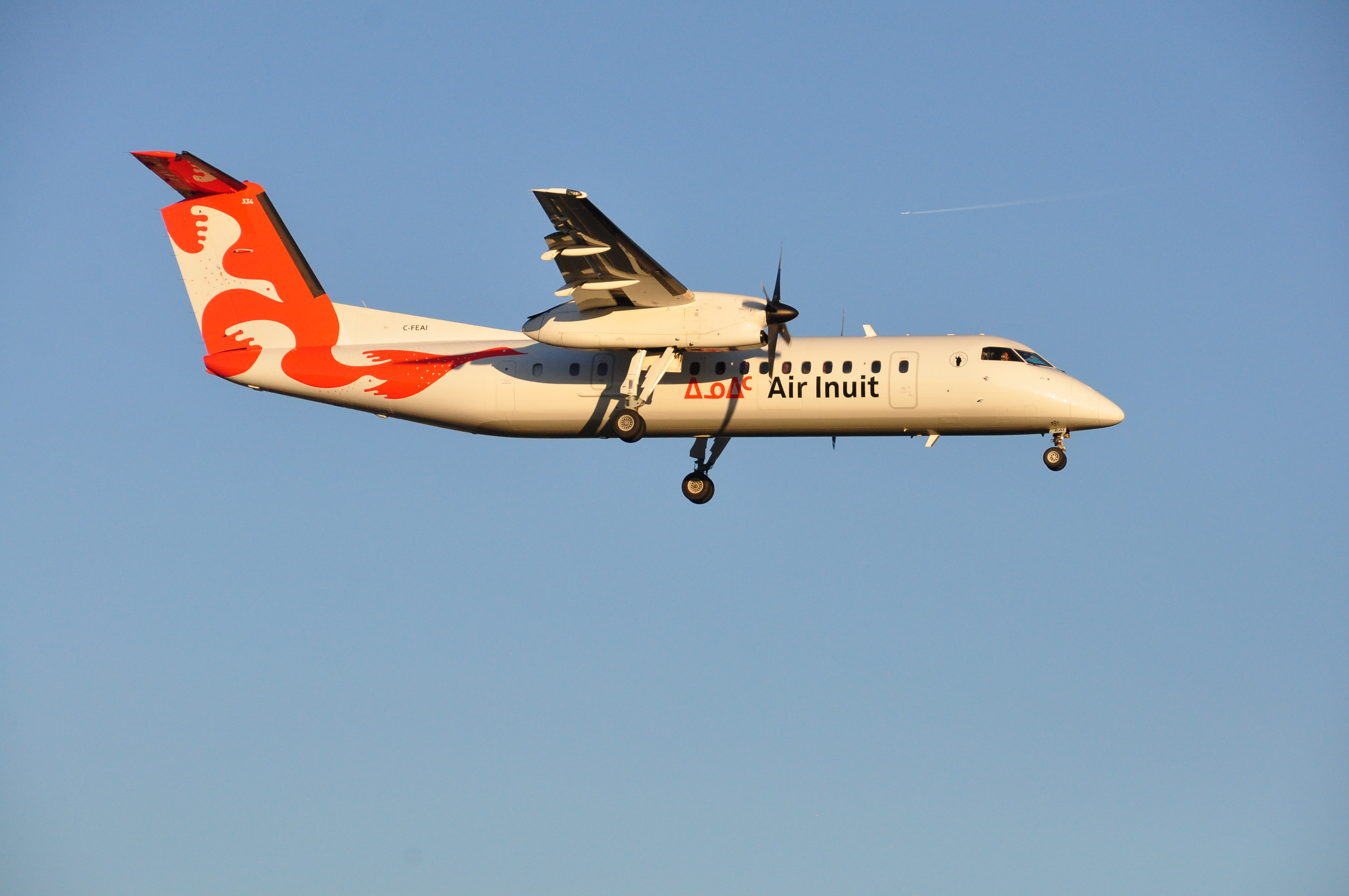
An Air Inuit Dash 8-300Q aircraft

In the summer of 2016, Haney was promoted to captain. When she flew back to Inukjuak in September, several hundred people from her community gathered to meet her at the airport.

She now regularly flies a Dash 8 Combi-300, making tight landings on runways that are often just barely long enough for her aircraft.

On August 15, 2017, the Canadian Ninety-Nines released a commemorative postage stamp featuring Haney. Speaking to reporters, the president of Air Inuit said that Haney "was a role model for all people in Nunavik, whether they're women, whether they're men."

As of 2024, she remains a prominent figure at Air Inuit, not only as a captain but also as a mentor to new pilots, particularly through The Sparrow program, which she coordinates to inspire and support Inuit youth interested in aviation (Yahoo News - Latest News & Headlines) (Nunatsiaq News). She is actively involved with Elevate Aviation, a non-profit promoting underrepresented groups in the industry, traveling and giving presentations to encourage youth to consider careers in aviation (Yahoo News - Latest News & Headlines).

== Personal life ==
Haney is married to another Air Inuit captain named Pierre-Olivier, and the couple has two children.
