= Of Natural History =

Studio album by Sleepytime Gorilla Museum
- Released: October 25, 2004
- Recorded: 2003–2004 at Polymorph Recording, Oakland, California
- Genre: Avant-garde metal
- Length: 71:52
- Label: Mimicry Records; Blood Music (vinyl reissue)
- Producer: Dan Rathbun & Sleepytime Gorilla Museum

Sleepytime Gorilla Museum chronology
Grand Opening and Closing (2001)	Of Natural History (2004)	In Glorious Times (2007)

Professional ratings
Review scores
Source	Rating
Allmusic	3.5/5 stars
Pitchfork Media	(7.3/10)
Stylus Magazine	3.5/5 stars

Of Natural History is the second studio album by avant-rock/metal group Sleepytime Gorilla Museum. It was recorded and mixed at Polymorph Recording in Oakland, California during the years 2003 and 2004. Whereas on the first album, Grand Opening and Closing, Dan Rathbun handled the mastering (in addition to producing, recording, and mixing), on Of Natural History the mastering duties are handled by Justin Weis, who mastered the album at Trakworx, San Francisco.

All the tracks on this album were produced by Rathbun & the other members of the band, except for "Phthisis", which was produced by Scott Humphrey, and recorded at the Chop Shop, Hollywood in May 2004; Chris Baseford engineered the recording sessions, while Garry Raposo and Vincent Piette assisted in engineering.

Like with the first album, this album again marks the transition from one drummer to another: Frank Grau, who replaced David Shamrock after Grand Opening and Closing, left after this album, and was replaced by Matthias Bossi, who plays different instruments on this album's tracks "Phthisis", "FC: The Freedom Club" and "Gunday's Child".

In 2024, it was named one of the 10 "wackiest" progressive metal albums ever by Loudwire.

== Music ==
Of Natural History continues on the same diverse and eclectic musical lines as its predecessor, with more new elements, such as intelligent dance music ("Bring Back the Apocalypse") and funk ("Gunday's Child"). Other elements include heavy metal ("The Donkey-Headed Adversary of Humanity Opens the Discussion" and "Phthisis"), progressive rock ("FC: The Freedom Club"), post-metal ("Babydoctor"), western music ("Cockroach"), folk music ("The 17-Year Cicada"), as well as many more. Also notable is the incorporation of a plethora of field recordings and samples into the songs and interludes.

Of Natural History has a continuity in the sense that all the songs sequence into each other, thus holding the narrative element(s) of the album better together. The continuity and the coherent feel make Of Natural History very close to a concept album; its underlying mood is concerned with the apocalyptic implications caused by human presence on earth. To offer different viewpoints on this, SGM create their own characters and stories (tracks 1 & 2, both of which are a continuation of a story created on the first album), and borrow from Filippo Tommaso Marinetti, Unabomber & T.S. Eliot, Muriel Rukeyser, and Kenneth Patchen (tracks 3, 5, 6, and 9, respectively) in addition to own lyrics.

According to the band's official website, Of Natural History is in part "a debate between two contradictory pillars of 20th C. Anti-Humanism: The Futurists versus the Unabomber."

== Track listing ==
1. "A Hymn to the Morning Star" - 5:40
2. "The Donkey-Headed Adversary of Humanity Opens the Discussion" - 6:01
3. "Phthisis" - 3:44
4. "Bring Back the Apocalypse" - 4:10
5. "FC: The Freedom Club" - 10:48
6. "Gunday's Child" - 6:56
7. "The 17-Year Cicada" - 3:41
8. "The Creature" - 6:00
9. "What Shall We Do Without Us?" - 2:38
10. "Babydoctor" - 13:59
11. "Cockroach" - 2:12
12. (Hidden Track) - 5:56

== Personnel ==
- Carla Kihlstedt - Violins, Percussion Guitar, Autoharp, Organ, Voice, Choir (Soprano Voice)
- Dan Rathbun - Bass, Log, Roach, Trombone, Lute, Voice, Choir (Baritone Voice)
- Frank Grau - Drums, Melodica
- Matthias Bossi (tracks 3, 5, & 6) - Drums, Glockenspiel, Xylophone, Voice; (track 1) Choir (Tenor Voice)
- Moe! Staiano - Metal, Wood, Bowed Spatula, Glockenspiel, Spring, Paper
- Nils Frykdahl - Guitars, Flutes, Voice, Choir (Contralto Voice)
