= Tigtone =

American adult animated television series

- Created by: Andrew Koehler; Benjamin Martian
- Based on: The Begun of Tigtone, by Andrew Koehler, Benjamin Martian, and Zack Wallenfang
- Story by: Blake Anderson; Frederic Cristy; Andrew Koehler; Benjamin Martian; Joseph Scrimshaw; Ryan Verniere; Patricia Villetto
- Directed by: Frederic Cristy
- Voices of: Nils Frykdahl; Debi Derryberry; Bill Corbett; Lucy Davis; Jeffrey Combs; Trace Beaulieu; Cree Summer
- Composer: Leo Birenberg
- Country of origin: United States
- Original language: English
- No. of seasons: 2
- No. of episodes: 21 (and 1 webisode)

Production
- Executive producers: Andrew Koehler; Benjamin Martian; Blake Anderson; Keith Crofford; Walter Newman; Chris Prynoski; Shannon Prynoski
- Producers: Dave Newberg (Pilot); Jennifer Ray (Series)
- Editors: Paul Mazzotta and Jeff Picarello (Pilot); Megan Love (Series); Marissa Mueller (Season 2); Andy Maxwell (Season 2)
- Running time: 11–12 minutes
- Production companies: Titmouse, Inc.; Babyhemyth Productions; Williams Street

Original release
- Network: Adult Swim
- Release: May 14, 2018 – October 12, 2020

Tigtone is an American adult animated television series that aired on Adult Swim. The series aired its pilot episode on May 14, 2018 before it officially premiered on January 14, 2019. It is based on the original characters of an independent short, The Begun of Tigtone, created by Andrew Koehler, Benjamin Martian, and Zack Wallenfang. They produced it through their own company Babyhemyth Productions.

The series was created by Andrew Koehler and Benjamin Martian and produced by Babyhemyth Productions with other two companies, Titmouse, Inc. and Williams Street. The setting is a parody of clichés and tropes from the medieval fantasy genre, with occasional steampunk references.

A second season was announced in July 2019. On August 13, 2020, it was announced that the second season would premiere on September 14, 2020.

In August 2021, Benjamin Martian announced that Adult Swim cancelled the series after two seasons.

== Plot ==
In a medieval world, Tigtone is an intense and high-strung adventurer with a penchant for the over-dramatic and a murderous obsession for quests. He resides in the surreal, medieval kingdom of Propecia, ruled by its two-headed conjoined twin monarchs, King-Queen, who is regularly flanked by their effeminate man-child son Prince Lavender and their frequently put-upon attendant Command-Or Mathis. Joined by his trusty and expendable companion Helpy, Tigtone regularly accepts tasks and assignments that take him to various locations in Propecia, slaughtering numerous enemies along the way.

== Characters ==
=== Main characters ===
- Tigtone (voiced by Nils Frykdahl as an adult, Cree Summer as a child) – The primary protagonist, a wandering adventurer with an obsession for quests.
- Helpy (voiced by Debi Derryberry) – An unspecified creature and Tigtone's companion whose regenerative powers make them regularly exploited and abused, even after becoming friends with Tigtone. In the finale of the first season, Helpy was revealed to have used Tigtone's quests to gather items needed for their master The Greater Good, only to subsequently be betrayed by The Greater Good and make amends with Tigtone.
- King-Queen (King voiced by Bill Corbett and Queen voiced by Lucy Davis) – The two-headed ruler of Propecia. One head is a male who is a king and the other head is a female who is a queen. In season two, it was revealed that the queen half of King-Queen had an affair with the late court wizard Amothedeus which led to Lavender killing the king half and send the queen half into exile. The queen half starts to hallucinate seeing her husband's ghost, as she plans to reclaim her kingdom. In "Tigtone and the Stakes", upon Helpy getting the queen half to Propecia, the king half is revived by Lavender as the king half apologizes to Lavender for not being his real dad.
- Lore Mastra (voiced by Cree Summer) – The intense keeper of the royal library who often acts as a dispatcher for Tigtone's quests. She is prone to unpredictable fits of rage.
- Prince Lavender (voiced by Jeffrey Combs) – The man-child son of King-Queen. In the second season, Lavender finds out that his true father is the late Amothedeus, making him a half-wizard leading to him killing the king half of King-Queen and driving the queen half into exile. He then collaborates with Spaceress in plots to take down Tigtone. By the end of the second season, Prince Lavender revives the king half of King-Queen while reconciling with his parents and maintaining his love for Spaceress.
- Command-Or Mathis (voiced by Trace Beaulieu) – The put-upon attendant of King-Queen, who frequently attempts to impress the monarch, but is constantly overshadowed by Tigtone's accomplishments. In "Tigtone and the Stakes," Mathis is turned to stone during the fight against Lavendar and Spaceress.

=== Recurring characters ===
- Memory Gnome (voiced by John DiMaggio in the pilot, Gary Anthony Williams in later episodes) – A gnome who dispenses advice to Tigtone through memories.
- Lord Festus (voiced by Sid Haig in the pilot, John DiMaggio in later episodes) – A recurring villain with a fetish for torturing people.
- Beconka (voiced by Cree Summer) – A wandering adventurer who becomes Tigtone's competitive rival.
- Spaceress (voiced by Maria Bamford) – An evil space villain who ends up on Tigtone's world at the start of the second season. She allies with Prince Lavender and he falls in love with her. The episode "Tigtone and the Seven-Headed Serpent of Kloom" reveals that she is just an alien worm in a robotic armor.

== Episodes ==
Season	Episodes	Originally released	
Season	Episodes	First released	Last released
Precursor		May 10, 2014	
Pilot		May 14, 2018	
1	10	January 14, 2019	February 11, 2019
2	10	September 14, 2020	October 12, 2020

=== Precursor (2014) ===
Title	Directed by	Written by	Original release date
"The Begun of Tigtone"	Andrew Koehler	Andrew Koehler, Benjamin Martian, Zack Wallenfang, and Cody Larson	May 10, 2014

=== Pilot (2018) ===
No.	Title (Note: All the episodes are always introduced and entitled with the word "Tigtone...".)	Written by	Storyboarded by	Original release date	Prod. code
0	"...and the Series" "...and the Pilot"	Andrew Koehler, Benjamin Martian, Blake Anderson, and Andreas Trolf	Freddy Cristy	May 14, 2018	000
In exchange for the release of their beloved court wizard Amothedeus, King-Queen tasks Tigtone with delivering their reluctant son Prince Lavender to the evil Lord Festus to be tortured. Angered at the prospect of being replaced by Amothedeus, his replacement (Blake Anderson) schemes to stop Tigtone from escorting the prince to Festus' kingdom.

=== Season 1 (2019) ===
No. overall	No. in season	Title	Written by	Storyboarded by	Original release date	Prod. code	U.S. viewers (millions)
1	1	"...and His Fellowship Of"	Benjamin Martian	Sean Glaze and Stanley Von Medvey	January 14, 2019	TBA	N/A
Tigtone is tasked with defeating the necromancer Wadsor (Brandon Johnson), who has been stealing the souls from Propecia's chickens as a means of revitalizing his rock army. While preferring to accomplish the task to kill Wadsor with a magic dagger by himself, Tigone is reluctant with having King-Queen provide him with a fellowship consisting of the ranger Poach-Or (Blake Anderson), the barbarian Axeanne (Cree Summer), and the elf Redünart. Along the way, his companions are each killed one-by-one throughout his quest as Tigtone rescues a creature he dubs Helpy whom Wadsor held prisoner for his magical regeneration powers. Helpy helps Tigtone kill Wadsor with Tigtone deciding to keep Helpy as his companion.
2	2	"...and the Beautiful War"	Andreas Trolf	Frederic Cristy	January 14, 2019	TBA	N/A
A spreading plague of beauty has wracked the land of Propecia, and made it impossible for Lord Festus to do his job, working best in a brutal and hideous environment. He calls upon Tigtone to find the source of the beauty plague (which has already claimed Helpy, making him incredibly handsome) and put an end to it, to "re-uglify" the land. Their travels lead them to a kingdom of stunningly gorgeous unicorns residing above the clouds, who are locked in battle with each other to determine who is the most beautiful. Amidst the chaos of the battling unicorns, Tigtone meets an ugly unicorn named Zlotovf (Alan Oppenheimer), who explains that their bloodshed is what's causing the beauty plague in Tigtone's realm, and reveals another hidden world above the unicorn's, where a race of hideously ugly creatures reside. Tigtone and Helpy journey to this realm, and upon discovering that the creatures' tears reverse the unicorn's blood, Tigtone verbally abuses them until they cry an uglifying rain upon the land.
3	3	"...and the Wine Crisis"	Andreas Trolf	Sean Glaze and Stanley Von Medvey	January 21, 2019	TBA	N/A
A wine shortage has wracked Propecia, and several of the land's vineyards have gone missing, leaving the populace without much-desired wine to drink. King-Queen tasks Tigtone with finding the cause of the wine shortage before it's too late. Tigtone and Helpy's travels lead them to an untouched vineyard, where they happily drink their fill of wine, only for the entire vineyard (along with the rest of Propecia's vineyards) to be uprooted by a band of sky pirates, led by the vicious air pirate Zuviell (Grey DeLisle). Tigtone fights Zuviell to a standstill, and he and Helpy are forced to retreat. Tigtone soon hatches a plan to rid themselves of the sky pirates, by turning Helpy into a vampire, and unleashing them upon the pirates in their slumber. They awaken in horror to discover their transformation, only for Tigtone to explain that they no longer crave wine, but blood instead. Upon realizing this, Zuviell declares they will no longer steal wine, and returns the stolen vineyards to Propecia, where they set to drinking the blood of its denizens.
4	4	"...and Those Elemental Kings"	Andrew Koehler	Frederic Cristy, Sean Glaze, and Stanley Von Medvey	January 21, 2019	TBA	N/A
Tigtone regales Helpy with a story of the time he discovered an enchanted doorway, which only could be opened with several symbols of power held by four elemental kings. In his story, Tigtone fights the gargantuan Metal King, the hideous Blood King (Neil Hamburger), the pushover Lightning King, and the masochistic Pain King, receiving tokens of power from each one as he defeats them. Helpy then asks what Tigtone discovered behind the doorway once he got it open, only for Tigtone to remember that he never opened the door after receiving the symbols. The two of them immediately head to the doorway's location to see for themselves, but the visions they encounter inside of it horrify and traumatize the both of them for several days. Tigtone then declares that no mortal man should ever set foot inside the door... for free. The two of them then set up an admissions booth and charge the people of Propecia to walk through the door and experience its horrors themselves.
5	5	"...and the Wizard Hunt"	Joseph Scrimshaw	Frederic Cristy, Sean Glaze, and Stanley Von Medvey	January 28, 2019	TBA	N/A
Tigtone is rewarded for completing a quest by being transformed into a wizard. As he and Helpy marvel and delight in his newfound magical powers, Propecia prepares for its annual Wizard Hunt during which an alignment of the land's many moons saps the land's magician community of its magical powers rendering them mortal. Tigtone soon finds himself caught up in the middle of the hunt when his powers give out without warning gravely injuring Helpy who can no longer magically regenerate. Tigtone seeks refuge amongst a clan of wizards hiding out from the hunting parties whose leader Crackers (Fred Willard) devises a plan to reroute all the magic sapped by Propecia's moons into the creation of a giant kaiju-like wizard. The giant wizard goes berserk and begins to destroy much of Propecia during which Tigtone comes up with a new plan: Build a giant Tigtone to battle the wizard. With the assistance of the giant Tigtone, the kaiju wizard is defeated, releasing all the collected magic back into Propecia's wizards and into Helpy who can now regenerate again.
6	6	"...and the Freaks of Love"	Patricia Villetto	Sean Glaze and Stanley Von Medvey	January 28, 2019	TBA	N/A
Tigtone and Helpy enthusiastically answer the call to quest for a coven of centaurs. Tigtone's excitement turns to disappointment when he learns that his task is to locate the legendary Fertile Centaur (John Waters) and escort him back to the coven before sundown. Tigtone agrees, but angrily makes his disdain for the quest known at every opportunity, escort quests being Tigtone's least favorite. He and Helpy locate the Fertile Centaur, but find him a nuisance who stubbornly refuses to travel and is very nearly killed multiple times. After Tigtone searches inward, he realizes that all of his quests have indirectly been escort quests and fully dedicates himself to completing his task, which moves the Fertile Centaur into cooperation, before promptly dying from an allergic reaction to a bee sting, forcing Tigtone and Helpy to cobble together a makeshift fake Fertile Centaur to present to the coven.
7	7	"...and His Manless Match"	Andreas Trolf	Frederic Cristy, Sean Glaze, and Stanley Von Medvey	February 4, 2019	TBA	N/A
In between quests, Tigtone happens upon Beconka (Cree Summer), who appears to be a gender-swapped equal to Tigtone. Feeling equally threatened and romantically enthralled by each other, the two set off on a race through the body of an ancient giant (Benjamin Martin) to recover an ancient treasure within. After mercilessly competing with each other throughout the journey, Tigtone and Beconka eventually realize they will not be able to traverse the giant separately and team up, becoming soulmates along the way. Meanwhile Helpy stays behind at the tavern with Beconka's helper Jacques (Gary Anthony Williams) who lords over Helpy with his superior qualities, driving Helpy into depression and inferiority complex. Helpy turns the tables on Jacques however, murdering him brutally after learning Jacques does not have regenerative powers. After retrieving their quarry Tigtone and Helpy part ways with Beconka, mourning that in spite of their mutual love of questing they could never be together.
8	8	"...and the Cemetery of the Dead"	Benjamin Martian	Frederic Cristy, Sean Glaze, and Stanley Von Medvey	February 4, 2019	TBA	N/A
After being called to investigate a series of murders at a local campsite, Tigtone deduces that the only way to get the answers he seeks is to enter the land of the dead and interrogate the spirits of those that were killed. With the assistance of a temporary death potion, Tigtone enters the afterlife and is initially confused by the terrified reaction he receives. A mysterious spirit (Paul Reubens) reveals to Tigtone's horror that he was responsible for the murders. Upon his revival from temporary death, Tigtone turns himself in to Propecia's authority to be tried and executed. Helpy, not convinced that Tigtone was responsible, decides to investigate. Helpy soon discovers that the murders were committed by the local groundskeeper C.J. (Blake Anderson), who had disguised himself as Tigtone to frame him at the orders of the mysterious spirit in the afterlife, revealed to be a serial killer whom Tigtone had brought to justice named Cryptomb. Before Tigtone can be executed, Helpy reveals the truth to Propecia. Enraged, Tigtone re-enters the afterlife temporarily and takes revenge on Cryptomb and C.J. for framing him.
9	9	"...and the Singing Blade"	Benjamin Martian	Mike Carlo, Sean Glaze, and Stanley Von Medvey	February 11, 2019	TBA	N/A
The story is told from the perspective of the talking, murderous Bard Sword (John DiMaggio), recounting the story of his encounter with Tigtone to King Queen and Tigtone himself in front of an active volcano. The Bard Sword sings a story of his discovery by a delinquent youth named Daker (Debi Derryberry), who teams up with the talking blade to kill citizens of Propecia and take their armaments, to build a body made out of weapons (for more efficient killing purposes). Tigtone, angered that there are no more weapons to purchase, tracks the duo down, but is unable to fight them as he morally cannot kill a child. To get around this, Tigtone drinks a magic potion that transforms him into a youth, but only succeeds in irritating Helpy with childish behavior. The Bard Sword completes his body without Daker, who gradually gets bored and leaves. Before the Bard Sword can commit any more murders however, Helpy arrives to challenge the Bard Sword with Tigtone, who has now transformed himself into a sword. The Bard Sword is defeated, but Tigtone is unable to transform back as he only has enough potion to transform back into a child. Tigtone is transformed thusly, while Helpy raises him. Back in present day however, the Bard Sword is declared to be an unreliable narrator and is tossed into the volcano.
10	10	"...vs. Nothing"	Andrew Koehler	Mike Carlo, Sean Glaze, and Stanley Von Medvey	February 11, 2019	TBA	N/A
Partway through a quest, Helpy reveals to Tigtone that they were on a quest of their own- to form a magical talisman known as the Jengas, which they had been doing over the course of the season with random trinkets found in each episode. Declaring that their life purpose was to help the greater good, Helpy takes the Jengas and disappears, but not before using it to bring the world into perfect balance and peacefulness. Tigtone soon finds himself restless and without direction, as there are no quests to be found in a peaceful world. In desperation, Tigtone calls upon the Crystal Gods for assistance, who reveal to him that the "greater good" that Helpy was assisting was actually a rogue god with the name The Greater Good (Jeffrey Combs). Determined to defeat him, Tigtone journeys to The Greater Good's ethereal realm, only to find that he has betrayed Helpy, and is now using them as a source of infinite life. Helpy implores Tigtone to kill them in order to sever their regenerative powers from The Greater Good, which Tigtone does with great hesitation and despair. Drained of regenerative abilities, The Greater Good is left vulnerable to Tigtone, who promptly kills him to avenge Helpy. In gratitude for killing The Greater Good, the Crystal Gods bring Helpy back to life, and the two of them leave with the Jengas. Once returned to Propecia, Tigtone uses the Jengas' power to create widespread chaos and havoc throughout the world, ensuring an endless supply of quests for the two of them.

=== Season 2 (2020) ===
No. overall	No. in season	Title	Written by	Storyboarded by	Original release date	Prod. code	U.S. viewers (millions)
11	1	"...and the Seven-Headed Serpent of Kloom"	Andrew Koehler	Phil Ahn and Richard Ramos	September 14, 2020	TBA	0.380
With new quests in Propecia, Tigtone and Helpy go on them. Prince Lavender finds out that his mother had an affair with Amothedeus and later visits his grave where he weeps. Being half-wizard, Prince Lavender kills the king half of King-Queen and drives his mother into exile while becoming the new king of Propecia. Because of Tigtone's actions, a space villain named Spaceress is brought to Tigtone's world and finds her attacks weak against him. As Tigtone gets ingredients for Lore Masta's soup, Spaceress collaborates with Lavendar to target Tigtone while the Queen works on her revenge on Lavender.
12	2	"...and the Screaming City"	Andreas Trolf	Phil Ahn and Richard Ramos	September 14, 2020	TBA	0.336
Tigtone and Helpy arrive in a city where everyone else has to scream or else they will die of an explosive death. This doesn't seem to be a problem for Helpy who just regenerates and Tigtone didn't scream from the start. To see this attacker, Tigtone exits the city with Helpy and meets a resident who rearranges Tigtone's face so that he can see with his ears. In this appearance, Tigtone discovers that a Sound Monster (Grey DeLisle) is feeding off of the screams. Tigtone comes up with a tactic so that the Sound Monster can feed off the inner screams. When the quest is done, Tigtone gets his face back to normal.
13	3	"...and the Chromatic Crossage"	Patricia Villetto	Phil Ahn, Richard Ramos and Katie Tamboer	September 21, 2020	TBA	0.470
The Zuzzlekins and Fuzzlefolk are planning to be finally reunited when the rainbow bridge is form. The evil Kaleido-Scoptor (Tom Kenny) tricks Tigtone and Helpy into giving him the Power Prism that would disrupt the rainbow bridge. An accident not only splits Kaleido-Scoptor into the Rain-Bone (Jill Talley) and the Brain-Bow (also Tom Kenny), but also separates Tigtone and Helpy who end up on opposite sides with Tigtone's sword being with Helpy. Tigtone and Helpy use a tactic to reunite Rain-Bone and Brain-Bow into their own body, but it turns Kaleido-Scoptor into a gigantic monster of bone and brains (voiced simultaneously by Jill Talley and Tom Kenny). Thanks to a tactic that Tigtone and Helpy use, they kill Kaleido-Scoptor's monster form where its carcass is used as a new bridge to finally unite the Zuzzlekins and Fuzzlefolk.
14	4	"...and the Demon Maze"	Andrew Koehler	Phil Ahn, Richard Ramos and Katie Tamboer	September 21, 2020	TBA	0.432
Tigtone and Helpy are in a Demon Maze and keep starting back in the center because the demon Mæggonoth (Benjamin Martin) keeps catching Tigtone killing the demons that respawn there. As Tigtone works to resist killing the demons there, Helpy is stalked by a Ceruszimar (Blake Anderson) who tempts him into dealing with Tigtone before he makes another mistake even when he destroys the eggs of a critically endangered Thirdling. When they reach the end of the maze and confront Mæggonoth who tempts Tigtone into taking vengeance on him, Helpy attacks Tigtone where they both end up back in the maze. Thanks to an idea by Tigtone, he gets Mæggonoth trapped in the maze as he and Helpy leave the Demon Maze. Before heading to their next location, Tigtone kills the Ceruszimar which he has always wanted to do.
15	5	"...and the Murder Mystery at the Death Tournament"	Joseph Scrimshaw	Phil Ahn and Richard Ramos	September 28, 2020	TBA	0.373
Upon capturing Helpy, King Lavendar and Spaceress hold a death tournament to draw out Tigtone while having an assassin take him out during the fight. Tigtone fights his way through opponents like Horso, Man-Hands, Bear-Hands, Twoclops, and Sabreteeth. From their trap, Helpy works to find a way to warn Tigtone. When it comes to the final opponent, Tigtone finds that the assassin is the scorpion-like Tonde-Mora (E. G. Daily) who Tigtone thwarted in the past. When it appears that Tigtone was killed and Lavendar and Spaceress go to confirm it, it was discovered that Tigtone switched bodies where Tonde-Mora was actually killed and the other Sabreteeth was a vendor. This causes Lavendar and Spaceress to end the tournament as Helpy is freed. During the credits, there is a memorium for the fallen opponents. In the post-credits, Helpy asks Tigtone if they actually switched places with each other, but doesn't receive an answer.
16	6	"...and Tigtone's Island"	Andreas Trolf	Phil Ahn and Richard Ramos	September 28, 2020 (Note: This episode had an advanced stealth premiere on April 1, 2020 as part of Adult Swim’s annual April Fools' stunt.)	TBA	0.297
After obtaining an amulet, Tigtone and Helpy follow one of Helpy's body parts back to the island where they find that Helpy's severed body parts have evolved into mutant creatures. They are given a feast by the leader (Benjamin Martin) made from Helpy's severed foot and learn of a beast that they have imprisoned. When Tigtone and Helpy send the severed part mutants into the volcano, they discover that the beast in question is a mutant called Hurty (Andrew Koehler) who was grown from Helpy's severed brain. Using a strategy involving Helpy's discarded parts, Tigtone traps Hurty and has Helpy eat the brain. Afterwards, the two of them take a break from questing.
17	7	"...and the Princess Castle"	Frederic Cristy	Phil Ahn and Richard Ramos	October 5, 2020	TBA	0.310
Tigtone and Helpy are abducted by a mobile princess castle where those inside act as the princesses. It turns out that the castle is possessed by the ghost of a king (Phil LaMarr) whose daughter left him. During this time, Tigtone runs into Beconka again where she is one of the captives. With Helpy under the castle's spell, Tigtone and Beconka work to find a way to regain their weapons, free the captives, and defeat the castle. Once that was done and the castle is destroyed, Tigtone and Helpy rebuild it as a mobile barn as it walks off.
18	8	"...and Lord Festus: Credible Threat"	Benjamin Martin	Phil Ahn and Richard Ramos	October 5, 2020	TBA	0.282
Tigtone and Helpy arrive at Lord Festus' lair where they fight their way passed Lord Festus' troll army. Once they fight their way through, Tigtone engages Lord Festus' troll son Festroll (John DiMaggio) and slays him. Then Tigtone and Lord Festus fight each other with different slave trolls getting killed in the crossfire. This lasts until Tigtone comes up on top and walks away from Lord Festus' body as the credits roll. In the post-credits, Lord Festus gets up causing Tigtone to fight him again much to Helpy's dismay.
19	9	"...and the Prison of Knowledge"	Ify Nwadiwe	Phil Ahn and Richard Ramos	October 12, 2020	TBA	0.300
20	10	"...and the Stakes"	Benjamin Martin	Phil Ahn and Richard Ramos	October 12, 2020	TBA	0.258

=== Shorts (2014–15, 2019, 2020) ===
In addition to the main episodes, there have been twelve Tigtone's Journal shorts released on Babyhemyth Productions' YouTube channel (like The Begun of Tigtone, these predated the television series), and eight Dear Journal shorts released on Adult Swim's YouTube channel. With the exceptions of Entries # 6, 8, 9, and 10 of Tigtone's Journal, which are slightly over a minute long, each has a runtime of less than one minute. As a promotion for Season 2, Adult Swim's YouTube channel released the short "Helpy's Useful Helpings," which is presented as an infomercial-like tutorial (note that the title for the YouTube posting is different than the video itself, which instead displays "Helpy's Useful Usings"). This short is over 3 minutes long.
