= Karl Coryat =

American writer, comedian, and musician

Karl Coryat is an American writer, comedian, and musician.

== Jeopardy! contestant ==
In 1996, he was a two-day champion on the television game show Jeopardy! Subsequently, he wrote an online article with advice for prospective Jeopardy! contestants, which included a method to play along at home, keep score, and gauge one's performance. Enthusiasts of the show, and now even the show itself, refer to this as the "Coryat score".

Coryat scores ignore all Final Jeopardy! rounds, wrong Daily Doubles, and only count correct Daily Doubles by the answer value.

== Music career ==
As an early member of the Immersion Composition Society, Coryat is the co-author (along with Nicholas Dobson) of The Frustrated Songwriter's Handbook, which details the method that ICS members use to write a large number of songs quickly. Tim Rice-Oxley used the method to write songs for the Keane album Strangeland, and Jez Williams, guitarist for British band Doves, has cited the book as inspiration for their 2009 album Kingdom of Rust. Coryat also wrote Guerrilla Home Recording and edited The Bass Player Book (all published by Hal Leonard Corporation). As a music journalist, he has interviewed Prince, Sting, Geddy Lee, Flea, Brian Wilson, Les Claypool, and others for Bass Player magazine.

As a multi-instrumentalist musician (vocals, bass, guitar, drums, and keyboards), he has been recording music under the name Eddie Current since the 1980s.

== Other pursuits ==
Coryat's essay "Toward an Informational Mechanics" was awarded a Judging Panel Discretionary Prize in the 2012 physics essay competition sponsored by the Foundational Questions Institute and Scientific American magazine. Drawing on work by John Archibald Wheeler, Carlo Rovelli, and Bob Coecke, the essay calls for a generalization of quantum mechanics that incorporates informational legacy or context into quantum measurements, which might ultimately lead to a description of an "it from bit" universe with the least possible complexity. He has produced video essays on how the biocentric universe theory of Robert Lanza may be the best route to this.

As a comedian under the pseudonym Edward Current, he makes YouTube satires of religious fundamentalism and politics, as well as serious videos demonstrating physics and criticizing the 9/11 Truth movement.

== Personal life ==
Coryat attended Brunswick School and the University of California, Berkeley. He lives in Arkansas.

== Bibliography ==
- The Bass Player Book. 1999.
- Guerilla Home Recording: How to Get Great Sound from Any Studio. 2004.
- The Frustrated Songwriter's Handbook: A Radical Guide to Cutting Loose, Overcoming Blocks, and Writing the Best Songs of Your Life. 2006.
- The Simplest-Case Scenario: How the Universe May Be Very Different From What We Think It Is. 2016.
