= Tales of Instant Knowledge and Sure Death =

Studio album by Idiot Flesh
- Released: January 1, 1990
- Genre: Progressive rock, avant-garde rock, theatre, experimental music
- Length: 50:24
- Label: Rock Against Rock Records
- Producer: Idiot Flesh; Mark Stichman

Idiot Flesh chronology
| Tales of Instant Knowledge and Sure Death (1990) | The Nothing Show (1993) |

Tales of Instant Knowledge and Sure Death is the 1990 debut studio album by avant-garde rock band Idiot Flesh.

== Track listing ==
| No. | Title | Writer(s) | Length |
|---|---|---|---|
| 1. | "Something" | Nils Frykdahl | 6:33 |
| 2. | "Thinking of a Number Above 17" | Gene Jun | 2:56 |
| 3. | "Meditation" | Jun | 6:45 |
| 4. | "Artstroking" | Dan Rathbun | 4:36 |
| 5. | "The Tale" | Daniel Roth | 4:32 |
| 6. | "Housewife" | Frykdahl, Jun | 7:54 |
| 7. | "Heavy Metal Beer" | Frykdahl, Jun | 5:52 |
| 8. | "Cosmic Interlude" | | 0:43 |
| 9. | "Get Floor!" | Frykdahl | 4:50 |
| 10. | "The Widening Gyre" | Roth | 5:43 |

== Personnel ==
- E. Horace (Gene) Jun – guitar, vocals
- Nils James Larson Frykdahl – flute, vocals, guitar, saxophone, percussion
- Daniel Wilkins Rathbun – bass, engineer, vocals, cello
- Daniel Aaron Roth – drums, metal percussion, saxophone, piano
- Charles "Chuck" LaBarge Stevenson Squier – drums, cover art

=== Guest musicians ===
- Danny Tunick – chimes, glockenspiel
- William Winant – glockenspiel, marimba
- Peter Josheff – clarinet

=== Production ===
- Per Frykdahl – cover art
- Mark Stichman – production, engineer
- Rance Mannion – engineer
