= Faun Fables =

American band based in Oakland, California

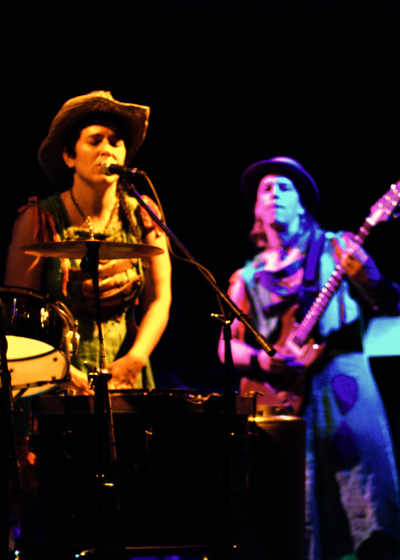
- Dawn McCarthy and Nils Frykdahl

Background information
- Origin: Oakland, California, United States
- Genres: folk rock Art rock Psychedelic rock Theatre; Performance art
- Years active: 1999–present
- Label: Drag City
- Members: Dawn McCarthy; Nils Frykdahl
- Past members: Jenya Chernoff; Matt Lebofsky

Faun Fables is an American band based in Oakland, California. Faun Fables also covers 20th century compositions by other songwriters and traditional folk songs. The band consists of Dawn McCarthy, Nils Frykdahl, and various artists.

== Background ==
Faun Fables was a concept vehicle for McCarthy, who was inspired to write the original material while traveling after leaving the New York City music scene in 1997. Music on the first album is entirely by McCarthy, as are all lyrics and most of the music on Mother Twilight.

All albums, except for the first one, involved collaborations with Nils Frykdahl and are inspired by McCarthy's previous work and "Dawn the Faun" stage persona. Frykdahl joined McCarthy in 1998.

== Members ==
=== Current ===
- Dawn McCarthy: composer, vocals, guitars, percussion, stomping, autoharp, gamelan
- Nils Frykdahl: composer, guitars, flutes, vocals, percussion, autoharp, broom. Frykdahl is known for his work with Sleepytime Gorilla Museum and Idiot Flesh.

=== Former ===
- Sheila Bosco: vocals, percussion
- Kirana Peyton: bass, vocals, percussion, harmonium
- Meredith Yayanos: violin, theremin, vocals, percussion.

The Transit Rider North America Tour 2006:

- Jenya Chernoff: drums, bass guitar, vocals
- Matt Lebofsky: guitar, bass guitar, warr guitar, vocals

== Collaborations ==
Faun Fables albums and shows also feature collaborations with:

- Frykdahl's family members:
  - sister Sheila Bosco (Autobody; Drumhead; Flaming Fire; zBug)
  - brother Brian McCarthy
  - mother Michelina Tyrie;
- Matt Waldron of 'irr. app. (ext.)'
- Robin Coomer of 'Loop!Station'
- Kirana Peyton of Blackbird Stitches;
- Isabel Douglass of Rupa & the April Fishes;
- Noe Venable;
- Will Oldham;
- Dan Rathbun of Sleepytime Gorilla Museum (bass guitar)

== Performance ==
McCarthy's performances draw on many influences, including British, Scandinavian, Appalachian and Eastern European music. Her shows often contain elements of theater—dance and puppet shows are common elements. She has covered songs of Ewa Demarczyk, Brigitte Fontaine, and the Bee Gees, and her music has been compared to neo-psych-folk artists such as Devendra Banhart and Current 93.

=== The Transit Rider ===
This is an ambitious performance and multimedia documentation of a song cycle entitled The Transit Rider.

== Discography ==
Release	Title	Label	Extra info
1999	Early Song	(unofficial)	Reissue: August 24, 2004; Drag City
2001	Mother Twilight	Earthlight	Reissue: August 24, 2004; Drag City
February 24, 2004	Family Album	Drag City	
March 16, 2006	The Transit Rider	Drag City	Music from the Stage Performance
November 16, 2010	Light of a Vaster Dark	Drag City	Music from the Stage Performance
July 22, 2016	Born of the Sun	Drag City	
Spring 2021	Elfrida	Fiddler's Green	One-song 7" flexi-disk, bundled within the magazine "Tales from Fiddler's Green 1"
October 7, 2022	Live in Norway		Self released on Bandcamp
May 30, 2025	Counterclockwise	Drag City	
