= In Glorious Times =

Studio album by Sleepytime Gorilla Museum
- Released: May 29, 2007
- Recorded: 2005–2007
- Studio: Polymorph Recording, Oakland; Tiny Telephone, San Francisco
- Genre: Experimental rock, avant-garde metal, progressive rock, progressive metal
- Length: 67:45
- Label: The End Records; Blood Music (vinyl reissue)

Sleepytime Gorilla Museum chronology
Of Natural History (2004)	In Glorious Times (2007)	Of the Last Human Being (2024)

Professional ratings
Review scores
Source	Rating
AllMusic	4.5/5 stars
SonicFrontiers.net	(8.8/10)

In Glorious Times is the third studio album by avant-rock/metal band Sleepytime Gorilla Museum. The album was released on May 29, 2007.

About the album, The End Records has stated:

Rock-against-Rock pioneers Sleepytime Gorilla Museum celebrate the extremes of sonic debilitation, with this muffled cry into the dark night of the soul. Triumphantly smothered within the intricate stylings of musical evolution, the expansive world of literature and the pain and passion of one’s emotions, the Oakland, California-based band have once again imbedded themselves deep in the creative process, allowing themselves to reach new plateaus on their latest album ‘In Glorious Times.’

Drums are performed by Matthias Bossi, replacing Frank Grau. Bossi also performs on the Museum's subsequent "reunion" album, 'Of The Last Human Being'.

== Song information ==
=== Helpless Corpses Enactment ===
Prior to the album's release, the track "Helpless Corpses Enactment" was made available for download. On May 22, 2007, one week before the album's release, a video for the same song was also released. It was directed by Adam Feinstein.

"I've been fascinated with SGM since I first heard them five years ago. I found their music inscrutable, beautiful, and profoundly original. [...] When we started to talk about a music video, I didn't know what song I'd be asked to work on. But from Sleepytime I knew to expect music that had invented its own rules, music that would challenge a video to keep up with it. 'Corpses' didn't disappoint! None of us wanted anything like a concert film - didn't want to see mic stands, guitars, drums. Nobody really even liked the term 'music video.' We didn't want to simulate what you could see at a live show. I wanted to use the opportunity to tap the peculiar power of Sleepytime's music - to conjure up images as strange and direct as those in dreams."

— - Adam Feinstein

The lyrics for "Helpless Corpses Enactment" are taken from the book Finnegans Wake by James Joyce.

== Track listing ==
No.	Title	Lyrics	Music	Song	Length
1.	"The Companions"		Sleepytime Gorilla Museum	Nils Frykdahl	10:04
2.	"Helpless Corpses Enactment"	James Joyce	Nils Frykdahl		5:57
3.	"Puppet Show"	Matthias Bossi	Matthias Bossi		4:15
4.	"Formicary"	Dan Rathbun	Dan Rathbun		5:46
5.	"Angle of Repose"	Carla Kihlstedt and Louise Bourgeois	Carla Kihlstedt		7:53
6.	"Ossuary"	Michael Mellender	Michael Mellender		4:35
7.	"The Salt Crown"		Sleepytime Gorilla Museum	Nils Frykdahl	8:40
8.	"The Only Dance"	Carla Kihlstedt and Wallace Stevens	Matthias Bossi		4:20
9.	"The Greenless Wreath"		Sleepytime Gorilla Museum	Nils Frykdahl	6:51
10.	"The Widening Eye"		Michael Mellender		5:09
11.	"The Putrid Refrain"				2:55

== Personnel ==
The instruments listed here are as they appear in the booklet of the cd.

- Matthias Bossi: drums, piano, glockenspiel, xylophone
- Michael Iago Mellender: percussion, trumpet, guitar, Lever-action lever, Vatican, Valhalla, xylophone, toy piano, Tangularium, Electric Pancreas
- Carla Kihlstedt: violin, Percussion-guitar, bass harmonica, nyckelharpa
- Nils Frykdahl: guitar, Percussion-guitar
- Dan Rathbun: bass, Sledgehammer-dulcimer, Thing

All sing.

- Guest Voices: Dawn McCarthy (track 2), The Billy Nayer Show, Joel, Allen, Olivia (track 3), Marc "Fushler" Goodman, Ian Pelicci (track 7)
