= Beep: A Documentary History of Game Sound =

- Directed by: Karen Collins
- Written by: Karen Collins
- Cinematography: Matthew Charlton
- Music by: Leonard J. Paul
- Production company: Ehtonal
- Release date: March 15, 2016
- Running time: 115 minutes
- Country: Canada
- Language: English
- Budget: CAD 61,606

Beep: A Documentary History of Game Sound is a 2016 Canadian documentary film written and directed by Karen Collins, who, according to Dana Plank on the Journal of the Society for American Music, has published "some of the most influential texts on the history of game audio." The documentary examines the history of game sound design from penny arcades, pinball and video games up to 2015. The documentary was founded through Kickstarter, and features interviews with people involved in game sound design, such as: Marty O'Donnell, Nathan McCree, George Sanger, Nobuo Uematsu, Yoko Shimomura and Winifred Phillips among others.

It was awarded with the Best Editing film in the Melbourne Documentary Film Festival in 2016.

== Cast ==
The following people were interviewed in the documentary:

- Becky Allen
- Yoshino Aoki
- Simon Ashby
- Clint Bajakian
- William 'Chip' Beaman
- Brendan Becker
- Erik Braa
- Anastasios Brakis
- Alexander Brandon
- Allister Brimble
- John Broomhall
- Tracy W. Bush
- Bryan Celano
- D.B. Cooper
- Michael Csurics
- Charles Deenen
- Peter Drescher
- Gordon Durity
- Mark Estdale
- Brad Fuller
- Scott Martin Gershin
- Jason Graves
- Andreas Hamm
- James Hannigan
- Lance Hayes
- Rich Heimlich
- Rudy Helm
- Spencer Hooks
- Steve Horowitz
- Shinji Hosoe
- Chris Huelsbeck
- Sam S. Hughes (Credited as Sam Hughes
- Noriyuki Iwadare
- Richard Jacques
- Damian Kastbauer
- Michael Kelly
- Hiroki Kikuta
- Penka Kouneva
- Michael Land
- Jennifer Lewis
- Levon Louis
- Richard Ludlow
- Peter McConnell
- Nathan McCree
- Dren McDonald
- Dan Miller
- Takuya Nakagami
- Koichi Namiki
- Michiko Naruke
- Graeme Norgate
- Martin O'Donnell
- Hisayoshi Ogura
- Joanna Orland
- Rebecca Parnell
- Leonard J. Paul
- Winifred Phillips
- Shannon Potter
- Jory K. Prum
- Tom Rettig
- Wilbert Roget II
- Arnie Roth
- Hitoshi Sakimoto
- Tom Salta
- George Alistair Sanger
- Nobuyoshi Sano
- Tenpei Sato
- Brian L. Schmidt
- Stephan Schutze
- Garry Schyman
- Tetsuya Shibata
- Yôko Shimomura
- Chanel Summers
- Yuji Takenouchi
- David E. Thiel
- Masanobu 'Tomi' Tomita
- Nobuo Uematsu
- David Viens
- David Warhol
- Jim Welch
- Tom White
- Guy Whitmore
- Alex Wilmer
- Nick Wiswell
