= Matt Lebofsky =

American musician

- Genres: Rock, Jazz
- Occupations: Musician, Computer Scientist
- Years active: ~1980–present
- Website: http://lebofsky.com

Matt Lebofsky is an Oakland, California-based multi-instrumentalist and composer. Growing up in New York he studied piano/composition with Arthur Cunningham from 1978 to 1988. As a performer/composer he is currently active in several bands such as Lunar Mistake, miRthkon, MoeTar, Secret Chiefs 3, Bodies Floating Ashore, The Fuxedos, Three Piece Combo, Research & Development, Midline Errors, Fuzzy Cousins and JOB. He is also a long-time prolific member of the Immersion Composition Society Origin Lodge. He toured nationally in 2006 as a member of Faun Fables, and throughout 2000–2001 as a member of Species Being, and released three albums and toured internationally with Mumble & Peg from 1995 to 2002.

Matt is also a computer programmer, webmaster, and database/systems administrator at the Berkeley SETI Research Center, working with Breakthrough Listen since 2015, and as a core member of the small staff developing/maintaining the world's largest volunteer computing project SETI@home (since its inception at the University of California at Berkeley's Space Sciences Laboratory in 1997). He also works on the open-source general distributed computing engine BOINC, and designed levels for the iPhone video game Tap Tap Revenge.
