= Immersion Composition Society =

The Immersion Composition Society (ICS) is an underground network of composers, organized into independent groups, called lodges, who periodically spend one or more days composing unusually large volumes of music for the purpose of creating raw material for their new projects. There are several dozen publicized lodges in the U.S., Canada, Europe, and South America. The book The Frustrated Songwriter's Handbook details the ICS approach to creative songwriting.

== History ==
The Immersion Composition Society was started in Oakland, California by two songwriters, Nicholas Dobson and Michael Iago Mellender. Noticing that they were spending large amounts of time thinking about music and waiting for inspiration to strike — instead of actually writing music — in early 2001 they developed a new songwriting method that involved composing prolifically while trying to avoid any kind of self-editing or self-consciousness.

The result was a songwriting "game" that took place over the course of a single day. They both began to play it compulsively. Within a year, Dobson and Mellender had formed a society of songwriters, and this game — which came to be called the "20-Song Game", was its central activity.

== Songwriter lodges ==
The ICS is made up of local chapters called "lodges" (the first of which was the Wig Lodge, founded by Bay Area composer/musician Steven Clark). An ICS lodge is not unlike a small, local secret society of songwriters. The lodge exists as a way for all of the members to force themselves to write as much music as possible. The privacy and secrecy of a lodge are there to create a "safe" environment for musical experimentation, free of unwanted criticism and negative social pressure. The members of an ICS lodge do their best to support each other completely, and each member is encouraged to indulge any musical whim or subject matter — no matter how ridiculous or questionable it may seem to the songwriter at the time. Each lodge has a "lodge head," and any number of members, averaging up to a dozen.

== The 20-Song Game ==
The 20-Song Game works like this:

1. The members start the day split up, working in their separate homes or studios. Each lodge member then attempts to conceive, write, and record as many new songs as possible before the day is over.
2. In theory, they are all aiming for 20 new songs. In practice, anything can happen. Making it to the 20th song is not the real point. the Game is more about breaking free of inhibitions, playing and exploring, and entering a state of creative frenzy.
3. The members do not use previously written material in their session, although broad details such as genre, mood, key, lyrical subject matter, or time signatures can be planned ahead. Song titles can also be planned ahead.
4. If the Game is being played by multiple players, in the evening there will be a meeting. At a set time all participants get together to listen to the music that they created for the meeting, and to swap session stories. This is how lodges of the ICS play the Game.
5. This game can also be played alone. A common method for solo players is to interact with other players online ("virtual lodges").

== Regional variations and special games ==
As more lodges were formed, ICS members from all over began to create regional variations, session themes, and new games with names like "Hat-Lib," "Spooling," and "Composer Tennis". Elaborate track swapping also became popular during this period, especially as a form of international musical collaboration. By now it had become common for Society members to personalize the 20-Song Game over time, cycling through periods with higher and lower volume goals. This was the point when ICS methodology started to evolve into a larger system for songwriters that could be used to tackle more or less any goal that the user wanted, including low-volume goals such as developing production, arrangement, and craft. A popular example is a member invoking "album clause," where for the purpose of working toward an album project, the member suspends some of the ICS customs at his or her whim.

== The Frustrated Songwriter's Handbook ==
The songwriting method employed by the ICS is detailed in The Frustrated Songwriter's Handbook (ISBN 0-87930-879-6), written by Nicholas Dobson and Karl Coryat and published by Backbeat Books. The book details the philosophy of the ICS and refers to the ICS songwriting system as "Immersion Music Method." Tim Rice-Oxley has said he uses the method to write songs for Keane, and Jez Williams, guitarist for British band Doves, has cited the book as inspiration for their 2009 album Kingdom of Rust. Members of the American experimental rock band Sleepytime Gorilla Museum, and many others have also reported using IMM's "songwriting games" at times to generate material for albums.

== Lodge list ==
As of January 2012, forty to fifty "official" lodges have been documented (not all are listed here).

| Lodge | Location | Date Started | Site |
|---|---|---|---|
| Origin Lodge | Oakland, California | 2001 | |
| Wig Lodge | Oakland, California | 2001 | Site |
| New Lodge | Oakland, California | November 2001 | |
| Neptune Lodge | Vancouver, Canada | December 2001 | |
| Bullet Lodge | Minneapolis, Minnesota | October 2002 | Site |
| Ox Lodge (formerly X-ray Lodge) | Santa Cruz, California | 2002 | Site |
| Thelemic Lodge | Washington DC | 2002 | |
| Capsicum Lodge | Oakland California | 2003 | Site |
| Urchin Lodge | Reno, Nevada | 2003 | |
| Red Curtain Lodge | Denver, Colorado | 2003 | |
| Limestone Lodge | Bloomington, Indiana | 2003 | |
| The Black Lodge | Austin, Texas | 2003 | |
| Kraken Lodge | Milwaukee/Waukesha, Wisconsin | 2003 | |
| Veronica Lodge | Portland, Oregon | 2004 | |
| Zero Lodge | Dallas, Texas | 2004 | |
| Glamour Lodge | Hollywood, California | 2004 | |
| Icono Lodge | Oakland, California | 2005 | |
| IncreduLodge | Seattle, Washington | 2006 | |
| Loge Cromorne 13 | Paris, France | 2007 | |
| Lazarus Lodge | unknown, France | 2007 | |
| Burning Lodge | London, UK | 2007 | Site |
| Eastside Lodge | Manhattan, New York | 2007 | |
| Heater Lodge | The North, UK | 2007 | Site |
| Limey Lodge | London, UK | 2007 | |
| Clutter Lodge | Gorinchem, Netherlands | 2007 | |
| Lodge of 1,000 Names | Los Angeles, California | 2007 | |
| Sardonic Lodge | Seattle, Washington | 2007 | Site |
| Sunburn Lodge | Tucson, Arizona | 2007 | Site |
| Hodgepodge Lodge | Frankfort, Kentucky | 2007 | Site |
| Gabinete Rolo Compressor | Campinas, Brazil | 2008 | |
| Geniuscar | Grand Rapids, Michigan | 2008 | Last.fm | Site |
| Keinotodellinen Saunaloossi | Finland | 2008 | |
| Sismeringa Lodge | France | 2008 | |
| Roger Lodge | Houston, Texas | 2008 | |
| Red Rug Lodge | Toronto, Canada | November 2008 | |
| Cull Lodge | Boston, MA | 2009 | Site |
| Mulch Lodge | Sudbury, MA | 2009 | |
| 668 Lodge | Brooklyn, New York | 2009 | Site |
| Jupiter Lodge | San Antonio, TX | 2009 | Site |
| The Pine Lodge | Sheffield, U.K. | 2010 | |
| Empty Bucket Lodge | Hamilton, OH | 2010 | Site |
| The Basement Lodge | Winnipeg, Canada | 2010 | |
| The Malmö Lodge | Malmö, Sweden | 2011 | |
| The Xenochronic Lodge | Atlanta, GA | 2012 | Site |
| Hop Lodge | Kelowna, BC, Canada | 2012 | Site |
| Fuchsia Lodge | Winona, MN | 2013 | |
| Interroclef Lodge | World Wide | 2013 | Site |
