= MiRthkon =

US musical group

miRthkon
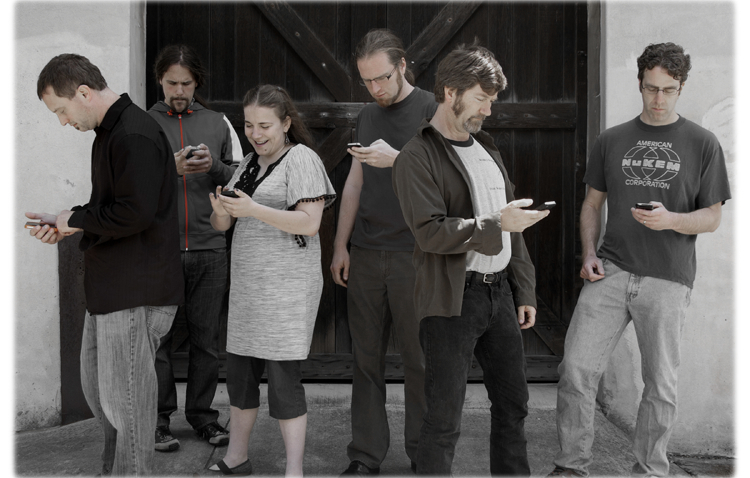
- miRthkon in 2012, L-R: Matthew Guggemos, Travis Andrews, Carolyn Walter, Wally Scharold, Jamison Smeltz, Matt Lebofsky

Background information
- Origin: Oakland, California, United States
- Genres: Avant-rock, Rock in Opposition, progressive rock, avant-garde metal, jazz fusion, avant-garde jazz, neo-classical
- Years active: 1999–2014
- Labels: AltrOck Productions
- Members: Travis John Andrews; Matthew Guggemos; Matt Lebofsky; Jarred McAdams; Wally Scharold; Jamison Smeltz; Carolyn Walter
- Past members: Aram Shelton; Dickie Ogden; Nathaniel Hawkes; Ben Doitel; Rob Pumpelly many others
- Website: mirthkon.com

miRthkon was an American avant-rock group based in Oakland, California founded by guitarist/vocalist/composer Wally Scharold. In addition to several album releases, they have also had a song featured in the video game Tap Tap Revenge ("Banana" was the Tap Tap Thursday Track on June 24, 2010). Their song "QXP-13 Space Modulator" was recreated in Guitar Hero Van Halen using the in-game song editor, GHTracks.

== History ==
While studying composition at the Oberlin Conservatory of Music, Scharold self-published several CDs under the miRthkon name. These early releases were not produced as albums but more as archival compilations of a variety of Scharold's compositions and improvisations, including several early, less developed versions of songs in the current band's repertoire. These performances featured one-off bands made up of Scharold's fellow students including trumpeter Peter Evans and drummer Brian Chase of the art punk band Yeah Yeah Yeahs. Upon completing his degree, Scharold moved to Oakland to attend Mills College for his Master of Arts in Music Composition, where he studied with Fred Frith and Alvin Curran, graduating in 2003. There he met other musicians to form a band and perform his older miRthkon compositions, as well as collaborate on new ones.

After starting with more standard rock instrumentation the ensemble evolved to include two guitars, two woodwinds, bass and drums. From this point forward the lineup has maintained this exact instrumentation, with a few changes in the line-up. With Jarred McAdams, miRthkon then added a seventh member, providing video for live performances and general conceptual design.

The band recorded an EP "The Illusion of Joy" with the core lineup of Wally Scharold, Rob Pumpelly (The Flying Luttenbachers), Carolyn Walter, Dickie Ogden, and Nathaniel Hawkes. While searching for a regular second saxophonist, Scharold's Oberlin classmate Dave Reminick was brought in to record all alto saxophone parts. Weeks before its release, alto saxophonist Aram Shelton joined to form the first core lineup. Shortly after that Nathaniel hurt his hand and was temporarily replaced by Matt Lebofsky (MoeTar, Secret Chiefs 3).

Lebofsky continued to perform with the band for eight months while Hawkes healed. During this time Shelton and Ogden both left the band, replaced respectively by Jamison Smeltz and Matthew Guggemos. (Guggemos also played in an earlier version of the band during Scharold's tenure at Mills College.)

Hawkes returned from his injury and the debut album "Vehicle" was completed and released in 2009 on the Italian Avant-Progressive label AltrOck Productions. It was well received and was selected as an 'Album Pick' by reviewer Dave Lynch on the music guide service Allmusic. After a spate of local gigs and touring on the west coast Hawkes decided to take an indefinite break from music and Lebofsky rejoined as a full member. That summer the band learned a New Music composition written specifically for them and small orchestra for a performance in San Francisco. For that show Michael Mellender of Sleepytime Gorilla Museum filled in for Pumpelly on guitar.

In 2010 miRthkon performed at the annual CalProg music festival in Whittier, California, along with District 97, RPWL, and Ambrosia (band). The performance was documented and is the core footage for their live DVD "(Format)." They also headlined the annual Switchboard Music Festival in San Francisco.

In late 2011 Pumpelly left the band, and was replaced by Travis Andrews. On May 19, 2012 Pumpelly returned for a single performance to fill in for an absent Travis at UnderCover Presents production of Paranoid by Black Sabbath, a recreation of the 1970 album by over 50 Bay Area musicians. miRthkon performed Scharold's arrangement of the album's final track, Fairies Wear Boots.

In 2013 the band released their second full-length album "Snack(s)" (also on AltrOck Productions) and toured Europe (including a headlining spot at the annual Rock in Opposition festival in Carmaux, France). In 2014 they went on a short tour around California opening up for Secret Chiefs 3.

== Style ==
Like most avant-progressive artists, miRthkon's musical aesthetic eludes easy categorization, its defiance of virtually all musical convention being the only unifying attribute. On their original Myspace page, influences listed included Albert Marcœur, Anton Webern, Fred Frith, Meshuggah, Henri Dutilleux, Anthony Braxton, Slayer, Henry Threadgill, Muhal Richard Abrams, Igor Stravinsky, Samuel Barber, and Elliott Carter. However, more than any of these, Scharold has repeatedly made claims to the significant influence—both musically and conceptually—of Frank Zappa.

Zappa's influence is prevalent in the musical complexity of the compositions, but is also felt throughout the band's satirical presentation of a number of concepts involving a dense mythology underpinning the band's recorded and live material. These concepts were taken to an extreme on the album "Vehicle" and a thread of continuity is maintained in their live performances via the projection of dozens of short films and fake commercials created by Scharold and video/conceptual collaborator Jarred McAdams.

Zappa's influence can also be found in the execution of the music itself. Scharold has stated in an interview that "when [he] heard [Zappa's composition] Be-Bop Tango and then learned that the entire song was a fully-notated composition, it was an epiphany: take a rock band and use it like a chamber ensemble." Every song in miRthkon's repertoire is fully scored in traditional and extended music notation, including fully orchestrated parts for the drumset. This approach draws on the notational practices of contemporary classical music, big band jazz, and thrash metal guitar technique, often incorporating many idiomatic techniques and employing the specialized notation standardized within each particular musical style. The process of rehearsing and recording the music is often done in the style of contemporary classical orchestral and chamber music, with a strong emphasis on ensemble interplay and dynamics.

== Current band members ==
- Travis John Andrews - guitars
- Matthew Guggemos - drums
- Matt Lebofsky – bass, keyboards, vocals
- Jarred McAdams - video, concept design
- Wally Scharold - guitars, keyboards, virtual orchestra, percussion, sound design, vocals
- Jamison Smeltz - alto and baritone saxophone, slide whistle, ratchet, vocals
- Carolyn Walter - piccolo, flute, clarinet, bass clarinet, alto/tenor/baritone saxophones, vocals

== Discography ==
- miRthkon (1999, self-released, CD-R)
- ruth-bikula phaze-ivy (2001, self-released double CD-R)
- The Illusion of Joy (2006, self-released, EP)
- Vehicle (2009, altrOck Productions, #ALT-009, CD)
- (Format) (2012, altrOck Productions, live DVD)
- Snack(s) (2013, altrOck Productions, CD)
