= Arthur Cunningham =

American composer

Arthur Cunningham (November 11, 1928, Piermont, New York – March 31, 1997, Nyack, New York) was an American composer and educator. His students included singer Kate Davidson, producer/engineer Peter Francovilla, pianist John Ellis, musician and computer programmer Matt Lebofsky, and Berklee Press editor-in-chief Jonathan Feist.

== Biography ==
Cunningham began composing music at the age of 12, which he performed with his jazz band. He attended Fisk University (BA, 1951), Juilliard (1951–1952), and Columbia University's Teachers College and received a master’s degree in 1957. In 1951, the National Association of Negro Musicians held a concert of his works. Cunningham served in the United States Army from 1955 to 1957 and composed music for army bands and television.

Between 1963 and 1973, Cunningham wrote seven large-scale stage works in popular genres such as jazz, gospel, and rock. Some of his compositions resemble what would become the rock opera genre.

== Musical Compositions and Stage works ==
- Patsy Patch and Susan’s Dream (rock musical for children; libretto by Cunningham; first performed in Orangeburg, New York, 27 April 1963)
- The Beauty Part (musical show with improvised piano accompaniment; libretto by S. J. Perelman; first performed in Blauvelt, New York, at Rockland County Playhouse, 13 August 1963)
- Violetta (1963; musical based on J. Audiberti's Le mal court)
- Ostrich Feathers (rock musical play for children; libretto by B. Brenner; first performed in New York, at the Martinique Theatre, 16 November 1965)
- Concentrics (orchestral piece commissioned and premiered by the Symphony of the New World on 2 February 1969, at Philharmonic Hall, Lincoln Center)
- His Natural Grace (1969; rock opera, libretto by Cunningham)
- Honey Brown (1972; for solo male quartet or men's chorus, TTBB; libretto by Cunningham). From Cunningham's forward: "The jubilee song is the unique invention of the black American and has accurately reflected his life experience for over a hundred years. It is my wish to continue that tradition and spirit of the jubilee song and to extend its boundaries to include contemporary compositional techniques."
- Night Song (1973; theatre piece, unperformed; texts in Swahili, Gullah, and English)
- House by the Sea (libretto by Cunningham; incomplete)
