= Fancy (Idiot Flesh album) =

- Fancy album cover (Metal-slipcase edition) (edited with watermark)

Studio album by Idiot Flesh
- Released: 1997
- Genres: Performance art; art rock; experimental music; theatre
- Length: 61:35
- Label: Vaccination Records

Idiot Flesh chronology
The Nothing Show (1993)	Fancy (1997)

Fancy is the third and final studio album by the American experimental rock band Idiot Flesh.

Professional ratings
Review scores
Source	Rating
Allmusic	3/5 stars

== Track listing ==
No.	Title	Writer(s)	Length
1.	"Dead Like Us"	Nils Frykdahl, Idiot Flesh	3:53
2.	"Idiot Song"	Frykdahl, Idiot Flesh	6:30
3.	"Teen Devil Worshipper"	Gene Jun, Jonathan Cantero, Idiot Flesh	2:29
4.	"Chicken Little"	Frykdahl, Béla Bartók, Pierre Boulez, Iannis Xenakis	9:07
5.	"Twitch"	Frykdahl	4:47
6.	"Drowning"	Jun, Jonny Axtell, Idiot Flesh	5:00
7.	"Motherfucker"	Dan Rathbun	7:21
8.	"Bach Is Dead"	The Residents	1:47
9.	"Diggity Cow And The Dandy Mr. Clyde"	Frykdahl	3:11
10.	"The Straw"	Frykdahl, T. S. Eliot	10:45
11.	"Cheesus (Dance Mix)"	Jun	1:34
12.	"People In Your Neighborhood"	Idiot Flesh, Sesame Street	4:18
13.	"[Hidden track: Dead Like Us (reprise)]"	Frykdahl, Idiot Flesh	0:53

== Personnel ==
Idiot Flesh

- Nils Frykdahl – vocals, guitar, flute, castanets; design
- Gene Jun – vocals, violin, guitar, metal objects
- Dan Rathbun – bass, vocals, cello, horn, trombone, saw; engineer
- Wes Anderson – drums, percussion, marimba, bassoon, vocals

Side Show Freaks

- Paul Dal Porto – "Helpy the Hamburger Bee", sitar, vocals
- Lorrie Murray – Hatcha, The Siamese Twin, fire eater/torch swinger, vocals
- Heidi Good – Datcha, The Siamese Twin, fire eater/torch swinger, vocals
- Brad Caswell – puppet show

Guest musicians

- Mantra Ben Y'akova – vocals
- Erik Carter – guitar
- Angela B. Coon – vocals
- Paul Dal Porto – horn, sitar; assistant engineer
- Jindra Dolansky – saxophone
- Matt Embrie – synthesizer, piano
- Jab – trumpet

Additional production and design

- Penny Allman – "The Queen of Oakland" photography
- Per Frykdahl – "Baby Fatty" cover art
- Lorrie Murray – design, photography, manager, booking agent
- Brad Caswell – lights
- Mark Stichman – assistant engineer
