= The Transit Rider =

Studio album by Faun Fables
- Released: March 16, 2006
- Recorded: 2003–2005
- Genre: Experimental folk; art rock; performance art
- Length: 56:06
- Label: Drag City
- Producer: Faun Fables; Dan Rathbun

Faun Fables chronology
Family Album (2004)	The Transit Rider (2006)	Light of a vaster dark (2010)

The Transit Rider is the fourth album by Faun Fables and the theatrical production on which it was based.

== Track listing ==
1. "Birth" – 2:10
2. "Transit Theme" – 4:46
3. "The House Carpenter" – 5:05
4. "In Speed" – 3:51
5. "Taki Pejzaz" – 8:12
6. "Roadkill" – 4:32
7. "Earth's Kiss" – 5:05
8. "Fire & Castration" – 4:51
9. "The Questioning" – 2:01
10. "I No Longer Wish To" – 1:13
11. "The Corwith Brothers" – 3:18
12. "Dream on a Train" – 6:51
13. "I'd Like to Be" – 4:11

== Background information ==
The Transit Rider began as a theatrical production. The inspiration for the show was McCarthy's experiences on the New York City Subway from when she relocated there in 1994. As a live performance, The Transit Rider premiered as a full-length theater show in San Francisco in 2002. In April through June 2006, the four-member version of Faun Fables including Jenya Chernoff and Matt Lebofsky toured North America. The tour culminated in a large-scale performance at the Oakland Metro Opera House in Oakland, California on May 26 and 27.

The stage was set to resemble a light rail train, with a row of chairs along the upstage wall. Behind the actors portraying the riders, three large windows showed projected images which are the work of visual artist Eric S. Koziel. The first act began with the performers entering the stage as if entering a rail car. As each character reached his or her stop (announced with increasingly cryptic commentary by Frykdahl as The Train Conductor) he or she moved to a microphone near the door of the train car, performed a song, and then exited the stage. Performers included Sean Lee, Mick Runolfsson, and others.

Following this portion of the performance, Moe! Staiano entered downstage and played an improvised piece on 78 RPM records in which he developed rhythmic motifs while beating the 78's with mallets until they broke into pieces; as the pieces get smaller, the pitch rises, and Staiano used this as a motive to increase the tempo and intensity until the fragments of the records flew off the stage under the power of his mallet-strokes.

Meanwhile, as McCarthy's interactions with the Train Conductor become more psychomimetic, Frykdahl enters in the guise of a travelling salesman, who offers McCarthy elixirs or charms which offer protection from various things including fire and castration, foreshadowing a song from the second act. At the end of the trip, McCarthy was left alone on the rail car, with only the disembodied Train Conductor (Frykdahl), veiled in shadow and making cryptic announcements over the public address system. McCarthy attempts to comply to rigorous regulations as intoned by the Train Conductor, as she tries in vain to try to find an appropriate stop along the rail line to have a picnic. This concluded act one, which was followed by an intermission.

The second act consisted of the four-member Faun Fables performing The Transit Rider song cycle in a faithful reproduction of the music as it appears on the Drag City CD.

== Reviews ==
Professional ratings
Review scores
Source	Rating
AllMusic	4/5 stars

- The Transit Rider, Live, Oberlin, OH 2006-05-01
- The Transit Rider, Live, Seattle, WA 2006-06-05
