= Grand Opening and Closing =

Studio album by Sleepytime Gorilla Museum
- Released: October 30, 2001
- Recorded: 1999–2001 at Polymorph Recording, Oakland, California
- Genre: Avant-garde metal
- Length: 59:08
- Labels: Seeland/Chaosophy (original); The End Records (re-release); Blood Music (vinyl reissue)
- Producers: Dan Rathbun, Sleepytime Gorilla Museum

Sleepytime Gorilla Museum chronology
Grand Opening and Closing (2001)	Of Natural History (2004)

Professional ratings
Review scores
Source	Rating
Allmusic	3.5/5 stars

Grand Opening and Closing is the debut album by the American avant-garde metal group Sleepytime Gorilla Museum. It was recorded at Polymorph Recording, Oakland, CA, and was recorded, mixed, mastered by bassist Dan Rathbun. The album was produced by Dan Rathbun and Sleepytime Gorilla Museum.

The album was originally released as a CD on October 30, 2001, by Seeland Records in conjunction with Chaosophy Records. When the band signed to The End Records in 2006, the album was re-released on September 5, 2006, with three previously unreleased tracks.

Grand Opening and Closing features David Shamrock on drums, the only SGM album to do so. He was replaced by Frank Grau, who plays drums on "The Stain" for this album.

Like with Of Natural History, some of the album's lyrics are inspired by different authors and poets. For example, the track "Sleep is Wrong" quotes a section of a poem by Dylan Thomas, while "Sleepytime (Spirit is a Bone)" is inspired by William T. Vollmann's The Rainbow Stories and phrenology.

== Track listing ==
No.	Title	Lyrics	Music	Song	Length
1.	"Sleep Is Wrong"	Nils Frykdahl	Sleepytime Gorilla Museum	Nils Frykdahl	6:35
2.	"Ambugaton"	Hank Williams	David Shamrock		5:38
3.	"Ablutions"	Carla Kihlstedt	Carla Kihlstedt		6:05
4.	"1997 (Tonight We're Gonna Party Like It's...)"	Nils Frykdahl	Sleepytime Gorilla Museum	Nils Frykdahl	4:48
5.	"The Miniature"		David Shamrock and Nancy Elliot		0:59
6.	"Powerless"	Nils Frykdahl	Sleepytime Gorilla Museum	Nils Frykdahl	9:30
7.	"The Stain"	Dan Rathbun	Dan Rathbun		6:46
8.	"Sleepytime (Spirit Is a Bone)"	Nils Frykdahl	Sleepytime Gorilla Museum	Nils Frykdahl	10:16
9.	"Sunflower"		David Shamrock		7:52

End Records re-release
No.	Title	Lyrics	Music	Song	Length
10.	"More Time"	Carla Kihlstedt	Carla Kihlstedt/SGM		2:48
11.	"Flinch"	Carla Kihlstedt	Carla Kihlstedt		4:46
12.	"Powerless (live 01/06/06)" (Recorded at Great American Music Hall, San Francisco.)	Nils Frykdahl	Sleepytime Gorilla Museum	Nils Frykdahl	9:42

== Personnel ==
- Carla Kihlstedt – Electric Violin, Percussion Guitar, Autoharp, Pump Organ, Voice
- Dan Rathbun – Bass Guitar, Slide-piano Log, Pedal-action Wiggler, Thing, Autoharp, Voice
- David Shamrock – Drums, Piano
- Frank Grau – Drums on "The Stain"
- Moe! Staiano – Percussion, Metal, Pressure-cap Marimba, Spring, Spring-nail Guitar, Popping Turtle, Food Containers, Tympani
- Nils Frykdahl – 6 and 12 string guitars, Tibetan Bells, Autoharp, Voice
