= Early Song =

Studio album by Faun Fables
- Released: 1999
- Length: 40:12
- Label: Drag City

Faun Fables chronology
Early Song (1999)	Mother Twilight (2001)

Early Song is the 1999 studio album by Faun Fables. It was released through the label Drag City.

== Track listing ==
1. "Muse" - 3:48
2. "The Crumb" - 3:04
3. "Old Village Churchyard" - 4:19
4. "Apple Trees" - 4:42
5. "Only a Miner" - 2:39
6. "Sometimes I Pray" - 5:01
7. "Honey Baby Blues" - 2:20
8. "Lullaby For Consciousness" - 4:16
9. "O Death" - 3:42
10. "Ode to Rejection" - 4:02
11. "Bliss" - 2:19
