= Mother Twilight =

Studio album by Faun Fables
- Released: 2001
- Length: 61:53
- Label: Drag City

Faun Fables chronology
Early Song (1999)	Mother Twilight (2001)	Family Album (2004)

Mother Twilight is the 2001 studio album by Faun Fables. It was released through the label Drag City.

== Track listing ==
1. "Begin" - 2:44
2. "Sleepwalker" - 3:37
3. "Shadowsound" - 5:02
4. "Hela" - 4:33
5. "Traveller Returning" - 6:22
6. "Train" - 3:20
7. "Beautiful Blade" - 4:28
8. "Mother Twilight" - 7:01
9. "Lightning Rods" - 3:34
10. "Moth" - 6:06
11. "Girl That Said Goodbye" - 4:20
12. "Washington State" - 2:16
13. "Catch Me" - 3:05
14. "Live Old" - 5:25
