= Vaccination Records =

- Founded: 1992
- Founder: Dren McDonald
- Defunct: 2004
- Genre: Alternative rock, avant garde, experimental, indie rock
- Country of origin: United States
- Location: Oakland, California

Vaccination Records was a record label based in Oakland, California, throughout the 1990s and early third millennium. It was managed by Dren McDonald and featured avant-garde and experimental music groups.

== Discography ==
- VAC001 (1992) Giant Ant Farm – Them!
- VAC002 (1994) Giant Ant Farm – Fortune (CD)
- VAC003 (1995) Canaries/Pirate Jenny (split 7-inch vinyl)
- VAC004 (1996) Charming Hostess – Nub City (7-inch vinyl)
- VAC005 (1996) Various artists – A Compendium Preview Guide to Eyesore: A Stab at The Residents (7-inch vinyl)
- VAC006 (1996) Various artists – Eyesore: A Stab At The Residents (CD)
- VAC007 (1996) Poxy Boggards – Bawdy Parts (CD)
- VAC008 (1996) Giant Ant Farm – Dressed in Milk (CD-EP, with comic book)
- VAC009 (1996) Mumble & Peg – Mumble & Peg (7-inch vinyl)
- VAC010 (1996) Rube Waddell – Hobo Train (12-inch vinyl LP, one-sided)
- VAC011 (1996) Ebola Soup – Feeling Logy (7-inch vinyl, 4-song EP)
- VAC012 (1996) Various artists – Oh God! Mother Blood! (CD)
- VAC013 (1997) Mumble & Peg – Wondering In Volume (CD)
- VAC014 (1997) Frank Pahl – In Cahoots (CD)
- VAC015 (1997) Idiot Flesh – Fancy (CD)
- VAC016 (1998) Charming Hostess – Eat (CD)
- VAC017 (1998) Ninewood – New Can of Ice (CD)
- VAC018 (1998) Eskimo – Some Prefer Cake (CD)
- VAC019 (1998) Rube Waddell – Stink Bait (CD)
- VAC020 (1998) Various artists – Funny Rubber Hand (CD)
- VAC021 (1999) Mumble & Peg – This Ungodly Hour (CD)
- VAC022 (1999) Ninewood – American Salt Lick (CD)
- VAC023 (1999) Mumble & Peg/Fuck (split 7” vinyl)
- VAC024 (2000) GrndNtl Brnds – Communicating for Influence (CD)
- VAC025 (2001) Mumble & Peg – All My Waking Moments In A Jar (CD)
- VAC026 (2001) Various artists – Vaccination Records 2000–2001 Rawk Party (CD)
- VAC027 (2001) Rube Waddell – Hobo Train (CD)
- VAC028 (2001) Red Bennies – Announcing (CD)
- VAC029 (2001) Rube Waddell – Bound For The Gates Of Hell (CD)
- VAC030 (2002) GrndNtl Brnds – The Great Dumbening (CD)

Notes

- VAC015, Idiot Flesh's Fancy has Rock Against Rock (their own label) logos within the digipak and standard jewel case releases, though no versions of Fancy have their own catalog number for said label while previous releases of theirs do; Vaccination Records took precedence for this release.
