= Family Album (Faun Fables album) =

Studio album by Faun Fables
- Released: 2004
- Length: 59:18
- Label: Drag City

Faun Fables chronology
Mother Twilight (2001)	Family Album (2004)	The Transit Rider (2006)

Professional ratings
Review scores
Source	Rating
Pitchfork Media	(3.7/10)

Family Album is the 2004 studio album by Faun Fables. It was released through the label Drag City.

== Track listing ==
1. "Eyes of a Bird" - 7:30
2. "Poem 2" - 2:40
3. "A Mother and a Piano" - 4:52
4. "Lucy Belle" - 3:58
5. "Joshua" - 4:03
6. "Nop of Time" - 2:09
7. "Still Here" - 4:28
8. "Preview" - 4:53
9. "Higher" - 4:52
10. "Carousel with Madonnas" - 2:39
11. "Rising Din" - 4:32
12. "Fear March" - 2:21
13. "Eternal" - 2:52
14. "Mouse Song" - 3:26
15. "Old and Light" - 4:03
