= Elevate (video game) =

Literacy and numeracy video game

- Developer: The Mind Company
- Publisher: Elevate Labs
- Platforms: Android, iOS
- Genre: Edutainment

Elevate is an edutainment video game developed by The Mind Company focusing on literacy and numeracy.

Common Sense Media wrote that the game contains "speedy, amusing games sharpen speed but not grammar skills". CNET conducted a comprehensive comparison of Lumosity and Elevate.
