= Elevate Aviation Group =

American aviation group

- Formerly: Elevate Holdings
- Industry: Aviation and air travel management
- Founded: 1995
- Founder: Greg Raiff
- Headquarters: Miami, FL, United States
- Services: Fully Integrated Aviation Services, air transportation, and maintenance services
- Number of employees: 200+
- Subsidiaries: Private Jet Services; Elevate MRO; Elevate Jet
- Website: eag.aero

Elevate Aviation Group, formerly known as Elevate Holdings, is an American aviation, air transportation, aircraft management and maintenance service group. It was founded in 1995 by Greg Raiff.

== Background ==
Elevate Aviation Group is a group of multiple aviation and aircraft management companies founded by Greg Raiff. Raiff started his first business, a student travel and tour service company, while still in college. He sold the company in 1999 and started a company in 1995 which later became Elevate Holdings. Raiff is currently the chief executive of Elevate Aviation Group.

Elevate Aviation Group has several subsidiaries, including Private Jet Services Group, Elevate Jet, and Elevate MRO (formerly Keystone Aviation, acquired in June 2022). Elevate Holdings was rebranded as Elevate Aviation Group in 2022.

In July 2023, Elevate Aviation Group designated an additional $10 million annually for investment in jet card membership, on-demand charters, and brokerage services through Private Jet Services.

A Florida court awarded an arbitration award of $29 million to Elevate Aviation Group against iAero Airways in August 2023.

== Services ==
Elevate Aviation Group offers aircraft management and maintenance services, on-demand charter, consultancy for owners and charter users, and brokerage services for buyers and sellers.
