= Sleepytime Gorilla Museum =

American experimental rock band

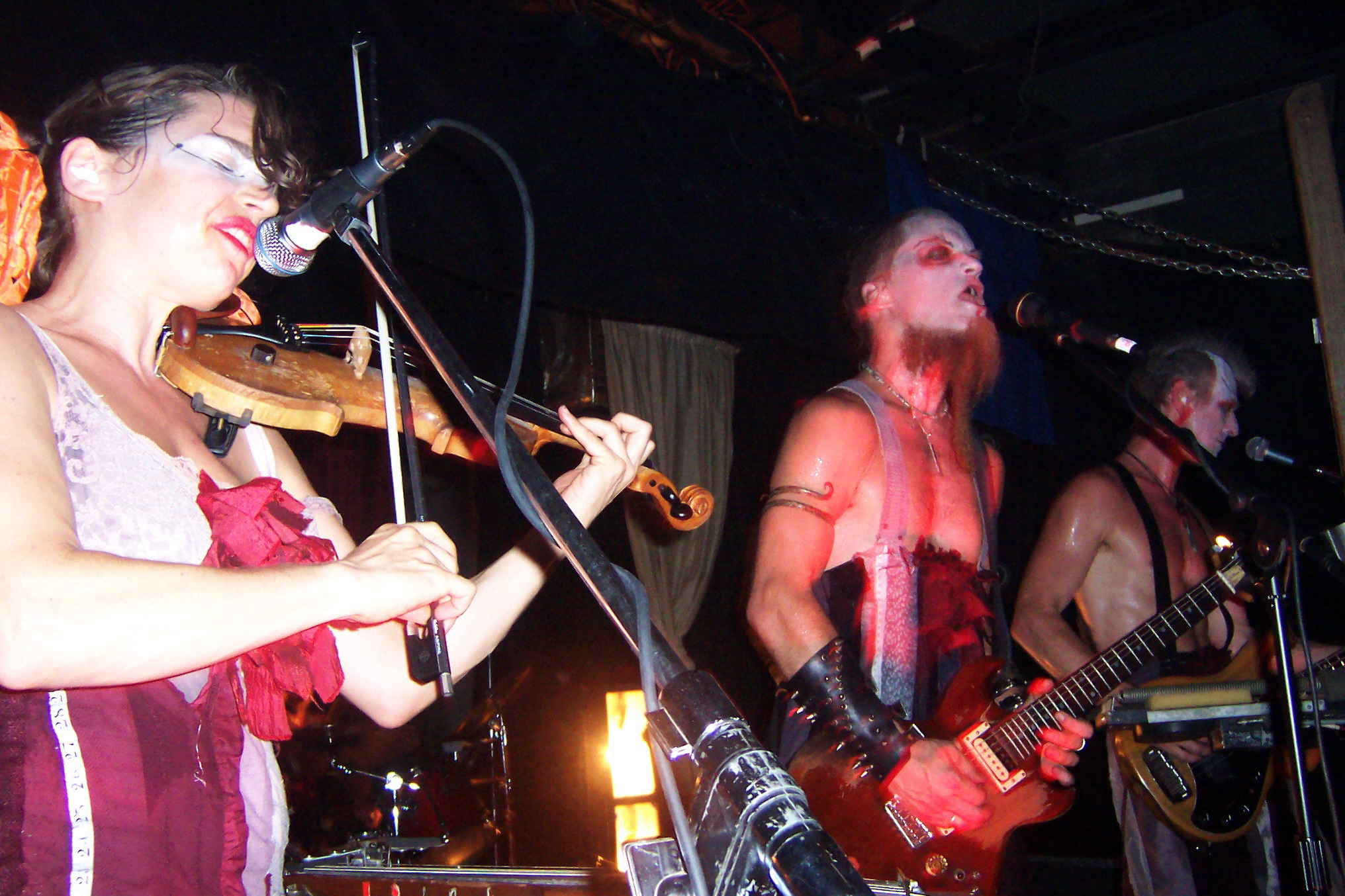
- Performing live in 2003

Background information
- Origin: Oakland, California, United States
- Genres: Experimental rock, avant-garde metal, progressive rock, progressive metal
- Years active: 1999–2011, 2023–present
- Label: The End Records
- Members: Matthias Bossi; Nils Frykdahl; Carla Kihlstedt; Michael Iago Mellender; Dan Rathbun
- Past members: Frank Grau; David Shamrock; Moe! Staiano

Sleepytime Gorilla Museum (often abbreviated to SGM) is an American experimental rock band, formed in 1999 in Oakland, California. The band fuses classical, industrial, and art-rock themes throughout their music. They are known to perform elaborate routines on stage and discuss possibly fictitious stories of dada artists and mathematicians.

== History ==
=== 1999–2011 ===
After the disbanding of Idiot Flesh, Nils Frykdahl and Dan Rathbun joined with Carla Kihlstedt (with whom Frykdahl and Rathbun had played in the band Charming Hostess) to form Sleepytime Gorilla Museum, along with percussionists Moe! Staiano and David Shamrock. Their first performance, on June 22, 1999, was given to a single banana slug (Ariolimax dolichophallus). The following night's performance was their first to a human audience.

Some time during the recording of Grand Opening and Closing (2001), drummer David Shamrock left the band and was replaced by Frank Grau. Grau also co-released the album, instigated their first tour and managed the band.

During the recording of the follow-up, Of Natural History (2004), Grau left the band and was replaced by new drummer Matthias Bossi, formerly of Skeleton Key. The Of Natural History tour saw Moe! Staiano's exit, and new multi-instrumentalist Michael Iago Mellender's entrance. In January 2006 Sleepytime Gorilla Museum signed to The End Records who re-released their début Grand Opening and Closing with three bonus tracks.

During early 2007, the title and track list for their third studio album, In Glorious Times was announced with the release date set for May 29, 2007. Prior to the release, an mp3 and music video of the song "Helpless Corpses Enactment" were made available online.

In February 2011, the band announced that they would play three final shows in California. It was also their intention to release a final album, a short film, and a live DVD.

=== 2013–2016 ===
In 2013, Matthias Bossi and Mike Patton, Scott Amendola and William Winant performed a live score for the 1924 silent film Waxworks, with the performance said to be filmed.

Nils Frykdahl, Dan Rathbun, Michael Iago Mellender, and David Shamrock, along with Drew Wheeler, formed a new band called Free Salamander Exhibit in 2013.

In a July 2014 press release for Rabbit Rabbit Radio, Carla Kihlstedt announced that a new track featuring almost all members of Sleepytime Gorilla Museum, including Michael Mellender who "penned the architecture of this one," was to be released in August 2014. The track, titled "The Perfect Abomination" was released on YouTube on July 31, 2014, and featured Kihlstedt and Bossi (of Rabbit Rabbit Radio, to whom the song is credited) with Michael Mellender and Dan Rathbun performing guitar and bass, respectively.

Announcing a 2016 re-issue of the band's catalogue, Sleepytime Gorilla Museum wrote "And so it shall come to pass that the SGM back catalogue will see the light of Vinyl." Official announcements for Of Natural History, In Glorious Times and Grand Opening and Closing vinyl re-issues were made by distributor Blood Music in September and October 2015.

=== 2023 ===
On March 22, 2023, Sleepytime Gorilla Museum changed their Facebook cover photo and included the message “Rise you must” and updated their bio to read: "The museum of the past hides the future." On April 27, 2023, they posted an image of sheet music titled “BRING BACK THE APOCALYPSE“ and included the hashtag #sgm2024.

On August 21, 2023 their Kickstarter campaign named "Save the Last Human Being!" went live. They had set a primary goal of crowdfunding US$75,000 to put toward completing a full-length studio album, titled "Sleepytime Gorilla Museum of the Last Human Being", a short film, titled "The Last Human Being: A Critical Assessment", and a short tour. A stretch goal of US$100,000 was set to help fund "a nationwide U.S. tour". They funded their primary goal in approximately two days.

== Name ==
According to the extensive liner notes for Grand Opening and Closing, the name "Sleepytime Gorilla Museum" comes from a small group of Dadaists, Futurists, and artists named the Sleepytime Gorilla Press. The group owned and operated what they called a "museum of the future" which was "anti-artifact, non-historical and closed."

The "museum" opened on June 22, 1916 (the same day as the band's first concert, 83 years later). The exhibit consisted of a fire which caused widespread chaos and confusion. The following day, the museum was closed (hence the name of the first album). The name itself apparently comes from a poem called "Of the Future Hides the Past," written by Museum members Lala Rolo and Ikk Ygg.

The band's interviews are the only source of information regarding the Sleepytime Gorilla Press, Lala Rolo, or Ikk Ygg.

== Style ==
=== Performance ===
Their live performances have featured puppet shows, pseudo-scientific scholarly presentations, and performances by members of the Butoh group inkBoat.

The band uses many homemade devices as instruments, such as the Viking Rowboat. Dan Rathbun — who created most of the band's idiosyncratic instruments — plays, among other custom-made instruments (though he uses a common bass guitar most of the time), a custom-stringed bass instrument referred to as the Sledgehammer Dulcimer (or, alternately, the Slide Piano Log), which uses piano strings and is possibly more than 7 feet long; it is played with two sticks: one in the left hand generally used as a fret, and another in the right hand to strike the strings.

Percussionist Michael Iago Mellender's instruments consist of restaurant kitchen equipment, trash can lids, and other "found" metal objects, in addition to traditional percussion instruments. One of the more infamous instruments used by the band was Moe! Staiano's Popping Turtle (now residing in Brooklyn, NY). It can be heard about 1:21 into the song "Sleep is Wrong".

=== Categorization ===
SGM's music can be likened to experimental rock or avant-garde metal; however, as inherent to the music, the band attempts to escape any categorization. In a review for SGM's second album Of Natural History, David Moore of Pitchfork states that SGM's debut album Grand Opening and Closing was an amalgam of Meshuggah and Secret Chiefs 3, resulting in "some truly cracked prog-metal anthems."

== Legacy ==
Tony Levin, known for his work with progressive rock pioneers King Crimson and also with Peter Gabriel, stated that he is a "huge fan of" Sleepytime Gorilla Museum and chose the track "Sleep is Wrong", which he calls "very, very powerful" as one of the pieces which most influenced his collaborative project, Stick Men. Levin also credited Sleepytime Gorilla Museum as doing "things that we never dreamed of doing in Crimson or in any band that I've been in," specifically their "radical" and "organic" shifts in tempo.

At least three members of Sleepytime Gorilla Museum went on to form the band Free Salamander Exhibit.

== Members ==
Some of the instruments are custom instruments built by the band.

Matthias Bossi

- Drums
- Glockenspiel
- Melodica
- Percussion
- Piano
- Xylophone

Nils Frykdahl

- Vocals
- Autoharp
- Flutes
- Guitar
- Twelve-string guitar
- Percussion guitar
- Recorder
- Saxophone
- Tibetan bells

Carla Kihlstedt

- Vocals
- Autoharp
- Bass harmonica
- Electric violin
- Nyckelharpa
- Organ
- Percussion guitar
- Pump organ
- Stroh violin

Michael Iago Mellender

- Accordion
- Euphonium
- Guitar
- Lever-action lever
- Pancreas (electric)
- Percussion
- Tangularium
- Toy piano
- Trumpet
- Valhalla
- Vatican
- Wheel
- Xylophone

Dan Rathbun

- Vocals
- Autoharp
- Bass guitar
- Lute
- Pedal-action wiggler
- Recorder
- Roach
- Sledgehammer-dulcimer/Slide-piano log
- Thing
- Trombone
- Tuba

=== Former members ===
- Frank Grau – drums, melodica (2001–2004)
- David Shamrock – drums, piano (1999–2001)
- Moe! Staiano – bowed spatula, food containers, glockenspiel, metal, paper, percussion, popping turtle, pressure-cap marimba, spring, spring-nail guitar, timpani, wood (1999–2004)

== Discography ==
=== Studio albums ===
- Grand Opening and Closing (2001)
- Of Natural History (2004)
- In Glorious Times (2007)
- Of the Last Human Being (2024)

=== Live albums ===
- Live (2003)

=== DVD ===
- The Face (2005)

=== Compilations ===
- Mimicry CD Sampler (2004) — Features a different mix of 'Bring Back the Apocalypse'
- Knormalities V.3: Posthumorites (2005) — Features SGM covering This Heat's 'S.P.Q.R.'

== See also ==
- Romantic Warriors II: A Progressive Music Saga About Rock in Opposition
