= With Friends from the Orchestra =

Studio album by Marillion
- Released: 29 November 2019
- Studio: The Racket Club (Buckinghamshire); Real World Studios (Box, Wiltshire)
- Genre: Progressive rock
- Length: 79:41
- Label: earMUSIC; Intact
- Producer: Marillion; Michael Hunter

Marillion chronology
Fuck Everyone and Run (F E A R) (2016)	With Friends from the Orchestra (2019)	An Hour Before It's Dark (2022)

With Friends from the Orchestra is an album by the English progressive rock band Marillion. It was released on 29 November 2019 through earMUSIC and Intact Records. The album consists of orchestral re-recordings of songs from the band's catalogue, spanning Seasons End (1989) to Sounds That Can't Be Made (2012). Recording took place at the Racket Club (the band's own studio) and Peter Gabriel's Real World Studios. Strings were provided by the in Praise of Folly String Quartet, and string arrangements were written by Michael Hunter, who also co-produced the album with the band. The release is the band's second album of re-recordings, after Less Is More (2009).

== Track listing ==
All tracks are written by Steve Hogarth, Steve Rothery, Mark Kelly, Pete Trewavas, and Ian Mosley, except "A Collection" and "Seasons End" written with John Helmer.

With Friends from the Orchestra
No.	Title	Original release	Length
1.	"Estonia"	This Strange Engine, 1997	7:57
2.	"A Collection"	"No One Can", 1991	3:04
3.	"Fantastic Place"	Marbles, 2004	6:01
4.	"Beyond You"	Afraid of Sunlight, 1995	5:25
5.	"This Strange Engine"	This Strange Engine	16:20
6.	"The Hollow Man"	Brave, 1994	4:23
7.	"The Sky Above the Rain"	Sounds That Can't Be Made, 2012	10:33
8.	"Seasons End"	Seasons End, 1989	8:00
9.	"Ocean Cloud"	Marbles	18:00
Total length:			79:41

"This Strange Engine" has an additional line of lyrics, which was left off during the original recording in 1997.

== Personnel ==
- Steve Hogarth – lead vocals
- Steve Rothery – guitar
- Mark Kelly – keyboards
- Pete Trewavas – bass guitar, additional vocals
- Ian Mosley – drums
- In Praise of Folly String Quartet

- Nicole Miller
- Margaret Hermant
- Annemie Osborne
- Maia Frankowski

- Sam Morris – French horn
- Emma Halnan – flute
- Phil Todd – saxophone (5)

== Charts ==
Chart performance for With Friends from the Orchestra
Chart (2019)	Peak position
Polish Albums (ZPAV)	42
Dutch Albums (Album Top 100)	79
French Albums (SNEP)	179
German Albums (Offizielle Top 100)	69
Scottish Albums (OCC)	85
Swiss Albums (Schweizer Hitparade)	85
UK Album Downloads (OCC)	39
UK Independent Albums (OCC)	14
UK Progressive Albums (OCC)	6
