= Less Is More (Marillion album) =

Studio album by Marillion
- Released: 2 October 2009
- Recorded: Spring–Summer 2009
- Genre: Acoustic rock, progressive rock
- Length: 57:24
- Label: Intact Records, Edel Music

Marillion chronology
Recital of the Script (2009)	Less Is More (2009)	The Singles '82–88' (2009)

Professional ratings
Review scores
Source	Rating
Guitarist	4/5 stars
Allmusic	3.5/5 stars
Classic Rock	7/10 stars

Less Is More is an acoustic studio album by Marillion, released on the band's own label on 2 October 2009. A retail version is distributed by Edel Music. The band's 16th studio album, it contains re-arranged songs from the period that Steve Hogarth has been their singer (since 1989) plus the previously unreleased track, "It's Not Your Fault". Despite some positive reviews, the album did not chart in the UK.

== Critical reception ==
The album received positive reviews from the publications Guitarist and Classic Rock, as well as the website AllMusic. Guitarist rated the album 4 out of 5 stars, describing it as "an intimate musical experience" and "a credit to all concerned."

== Track listing ==
No.	Title	Length
1.	"Go!" (from marillion.com, 1999)	5:02
2.	"Interior Lulu" (from marillion.com, 1999)	7:32
3.	"Out of This World" (from Afraid of Sunlight, 1995)	5:08
4.	"Wrapped Up in Time" (from Happiness Is the Road, 2008)	3:40
5.	"The Space..." (from Seasons End, 1989)	4:52
6.	"Hard as Love" (from Brave, 1994)	4:58
7.	"Quartz" (from Anoraknophobia, 2001)	5:48
8.	"If My Heart Were a Ball It Would Roll Uphill" (from Anoraknophobia, 2001)	5:12
9.	"It's Not Your Fault" (previously unreleased)	3:33
10.	"Memory of Water" (from This Strange Engine, 1997)	2:37
11.	"This Is the 21st Century" (from Anoraknophobia, 2001)	5:40
12.	"Hidden Bonus Track - Cannibal Surf Babe" (from Afraid of Sunlight, 1995)	3:27

All songs written by Marillion.

Lyrics of "Interior Lulu", "Out of This World", "Hard as Love", "Memory of Water" and "Cannibal Surf Babe" by John Helmer & Steve Hogarth, all other lyrics by Hogarth.

Music of "The Space" by Hogarth, Kelly, Mosley, Rothery, Trewavas, Colin Woore, Ferg Harper and Geoff Dugmore.

== Personnel ==
- Steve Hogarth – vocals, percussion (shaker • hammered dulcimer • glockenspiel • finger cymbals • bell tree • rainstick • tambourine • door knobs), keyboards (dulcitone • piano)
- Steve Rothery – guitars (acoustic guitar • portuguese guitar on "Interior Lulu" and "Memory of Water" • electric guitar on "Wrapped Up in Time" and "Quartz")
- Mark Kelly – keyboards (harmonium • pipe organ • piano • Hammond organ), autoharp, glockenspiel, backing vocals
- Pete Trewavas – acoustic bass guitar, xylophone, backing vocals, acoustic guitar on "Memory of Water" and "This Is the 21st Century"
- Ian Mosley – drums, Moroccan bongos, skulls

Note: "It's Not Your Fault" is a solo performance by Steve Hogarth on piano and vocals. Ian Mosley is also absent from "Memory of Water". As a hidden track, "Cannibal Surf Babe" has no writing or playing credits. Additional players listed in the booklet are:

- B. Hartshorn – bass harmonica on "Go!"
- Hs Ensemble – strings on "Go!"
- S. Audley – bowed glockenspiel on "The Space"
- R. Hazlehurst – clockwork effect on "Quartz"
- Preston Bisset Singers – choir on "Wrapped Up in Time"

Technical credits:

- Michael Hunter – mixing, co-producer
- Simon Heyworth – mastering
- Simon Ward – artwork, photography, design

== Charts ==
Chart (2009)	Peak position
Dutch Albums (Album Top 100)	72
French Albums (SNEP)	156
