= Sounds That Can't Be Made =

Studio album by Marillion
- Released: 17 September 2012
- Recorded: 2011/2012
- Studio: The Racket Club (Buckinghamshire); Real World Studios (Wiltshire)
- Length: 74:19
- Label: Ear Music
- Producer: Marillion, Mike Hunter

Marillion chronology
The Singles '82–88' (2009)	Sounds That Can't Be Made (2012)	Fuck Everyone and Run (F E A R) (2016)

Sounds That Can't Be Made is Marillion's 17th studio album, released on 17 September 2012. Besides the standard edition there is also a "deluxe campaign edition" containing a bonus DVD with a feature-length documentary called Making Sounds.

A 5.1 channel surround version of the album was released as part of the A Sunday Night Above the Rain Blu-ray set released on Racket Records in 2014.

== Political activism ==
The 17-minute opening track, "Gaza", is perhaps the most overtly political song Marillion have done since 1989. Its lyrics take the perspective of a boy growing up in the Israeli-occupied Gaza Strip. Singer Steve Hogarth explained, "This is a song for the people – especially the children – of Gaza. It was written after many conversations with ordinary Palestinians living in the refugee camps of Gaza and the West Bank. I spoke also to Israelis, to NGO workers, to a diplomat unofficially working in Jerusalem, and took their perspectives into account whilst writing the lyric. It is not my/our intention to smear the Jewish faith or people – we know many Jews are deeply critical of the current situation – and nothing here is intended to show sympathy for acts of violence, whatever the motivation, but simply to ponder upon where desperation inevitably leads. Many Gazan children are now the grandchildren of Palestinians BORN in the refugee camps - so called "temporary" shelters. Temporary for over 50 years now. Gaza is today, effectively, a city imprisoned without trial."

Like David Gilmour, Roger Waters, Chris Martin and others, Marillion support the "HOPING Foundation", an NGO that supports Palestinian children and adolescents in the refugee camps, and encourage their fans to do the same.

== Promotional activities ==
Like with several previous albums, Marillion used pre-ordering for Sounds That Can't Be Made to finance the album. In return, pre-order buyers received the special edition deluxe campaign edition box-set. The band had previously used the same approach successfully with the albums Anoraknophobia (2001), Marbles (2004) and Happiness Is the Road (2008).

Before the release of Sounds That Can't Be Made, two promotional songs were released on YouTube: "Power" on 17 July 2012 and "Gaza" on 4 September 2012.

== Cover ==
The cover was designed by Simon Ward. The artwork for the booklet was designed by five different artists, photographers and designers: Antonio Seijas, Simon Ward, Andy Wright, Marc Bessant and Carl Glover.

The binary data shown on the cover and the image on the box of the Deluxe Campaign Edition is taken from the Arecibo message.

Professional ratings
Review scores
Source	Rating
AllMusic	4/5 stars
Sputnikmusic	4.0/5 stars
The Huffington Post	5/5 stars
Metal Storm	8/10 stars

== Track listing ==
All music written by Marillion, lyrics by Steve Hogarth except "Pour My Love" and "Lucky Man" by John Helmer.

No.	Title	Length
1.	"Gaza"	17:31
2.	"Sounds That Can't Be Made"	7:16
3.	"Pour My Love"	6:02
4.	"Power"	6:07
5.	"Montréal"	14:04
6.	"Invisible Ink"	5:47
7.	"Lucky Man"	6:58
8.	"The Sky Above the Rain"	10:34
Total length:		74:19

The deluxe campaign edition comes with a DVD that contains a full-length documentary about the making of the album, as well as numerous sound checks for songs on the album, and music videos for 'Lucky Man' and 'Power'. The deluxe edition, like the Marbles campaign edition, comes in a slipcase, and contains a 128-page booklet.

In November 2013 a Special Edition 2CD Digipack was released. This includes a bonus disc featuring 3 tracks recorded for RTL2 radio on 17 January 2013, two live tracks taken from the Racket Records release "A Sunday Night Above The Rain" recorded at the Marillion Weekend in Holland in 2013, and a demo version of 'Lucky Man', which can also be found on the "Unsound" disc included with the Blu-ray version of "A Sunday Night Above The Rain".

No.	Title	Length
1.	"Wrapped Up In Time (Radio Session)"	3:58
2.	"Power (Radio Session)"	5:34
3.	"Pour My Love (Radio Session)"	5:28
4.	"Lucky Man (Demo Arrangement)"	4:12
5.	"Sounds That Can't Be Made (Live In Holland)"	7:50
6.	"Invisible Ink (Live In Holland)"	6:05
Total length:		33:11

== Track listing - vinyl edition ==
After months of speculation on the official Marillion website, the album was finally released on a 33⅓ rpm double-vinyl LP in November 2013. The track listing was identical to the original CD release, although some copies included a manufacturers mistake whereby the labels of side 3 & 4 were stamped on the wrong sides of the actual vinyl discs. In other words, side 3 was actually side 4 and vice versa.

Side one

1. "Gaza" – 17:31

Side two

1. "Sounds That Can't Be Made" – 7:16
2. "Pour My Love" – 6:02
3. "Power" – 6:07

Side three

1. "Montréal" – 14:04
2. "Invisible Ink" – 5:47

Side four

1. "Lucky Man" – 6:58
2. "The Sky Above the Rain" – 10:34

== Personnel ==
=== Band members ===
- Steve Hogarth – vocals, keyboards
- Mark Kelly – keyboards, backing vocals
- Ian Mosley – drums, backing vocals
- Steve Rothery – guitars, backing vocals
- Pete Trewavas – bass guitar, backing vocals, guitars

== Charts ==
Chart (2012)	Peak position
Austrian Albums (Ö3 Austria)	51
Belgian Albums (Ultratop Flanders)	134
Belgian Albums (Ultratop Wallonia)	75
Dutch Albums (Album Top 100)	22
French Albums (SNEP)	41
German Albums (Offizielle Top 100)	29
Italian Albums (FIMI)	47
Norwegian Albums (VG-lista)	37
Swedish Albums (Sverigetopplistan)	55
Swiss Albums (Schweizer Hitparade)	58
UK Albums (OCC)	43
