= Don't Hurt Yourself (Marillion song) =

2004 single by Marillion

Single by Marillion

from the album Marbles
- Released: 12 July 2004
- Genre: Pop rock
- Length: 3:45 (single edit)
- Label: Intact
- Songwriters: Steve Hogarth, Steve Rothery, Mark Kelly, Pete Trewavas, Ian Mosley
- Producer: Dave Meegan

Marillion singles chronology
"You're Gone" (2004)	"Don't Hurt Yourself" (2004)	"The Damage (Live)" (2004)

Alternative cover
- Cover of the two-track disc

"Don't Hurt Yourself" is the second single from Marillion's 13th studio album Marbles, released on 12 July 2004. Following the band's comeback to the upper regions of the UK Singles Chart with the previous single "You're Gone" in May, it reached number 16, becoming their second-highest-charting hit since 1987's "Incommunicado". As with "You're Gone", the chart success of this single was largely based on making it available in two formats and encouraging fans to buy them simultaneously in the first week after their release. It also reached a top 40 position in the Dutch charts.

One of the two available discs contained a version of the Marbles album track "Angelina" mixed by Steven Wilson of Porcupine Tree.

== Track list ==
=== Version A (Red cover, "Girl") ===
1. Don't Hurt Yourself (Single Edit) – 3:45
2. Fantastic Place (Live)
3. The Damage (Live)
4. Don't Hurt Yourself (Video)

=== Version B (Blue cover, "Boy") ===
1. Don't Hurt Yourself (Single Edit) – 3:45
2. Angelina (Steven Wilson Mix) – 5:58

== Personnel ==
- Steve Hogarth – vocals
- Mark Kelly – keyboards
- Ian Mosley – drums
- Steve Rothery – guitar
- Pete Trewavas – bass guitar
- Carrie Tree - backing vocals on "Angelina"

== Charts ==
Chart (2004)	Peak position
UK Singles Chart	16
Netherlands Singles Chart	35
