= An Hour Before It's Dark =

Studio album by Marillion
- Released: 4 March 2022
- Recorded: 2021
- Studio: The Racket Club, Aylesbury, Buckinghamshire; Real World, Box, Wiltshire; Ace, Aartselaar, Belgium
- Genre: Neo-prog
- Length: 54:10
- Label: Intact; earMUSIC
- Producer: Marillion; Michael Hunter

Marillion chronology
With Friends from the Orchestra (2019)	An Hour Before It's Dark (2022)

Professional ratings
Review scores
Source	Rating
Classic Rock	4.5/5 stars

An Hour Before It's Dark is the 20th studio album by British neo-prog band Marillion, released on 4 March 2022 by Intact and earMUSIC.

== Background ==
On 3 August 2021, Marillion announced the launch of their new pre-order campaign for the recording and release of a new studio album, their first since With Friends from the Orchestra (2019). Frontman Steve Hogarth said "the overall feeling" of the album "is surprisingly upbeat", with the Choir Noir adding "new soul" and "colour" to the music.

The album includes a behind the scenes documentary about the making of the record, and a performance of "Murder Machines" from Real World Studios.

== Release ==
An Hour Before It's Dark was released on 4 March 2022. To promote the record, several London black cabs were decorated with the album's artwork, and free rides were given to customers who gave the album's title as a password. The promotion ran during March 4–14.

On 7 March 2022, the band announced a 9-date UK tour for September 2022.

== Commercial performance ==
On the UK Albums Chart dated 11 March 2022, An Hour Before It's Dark entered at number two, their highest chart position since Clutching at Straws reached the same position in 1987.

== Track listing ==
All lyrics are written by Steve Hogarth; all music is composed by Marillion.

An Hour Before It's Dark track listing
No.	Title	Length
1.	"Be Hard on Yourself": i. "The Tear in the Big Picture"; ii. "Lust for Luxury"; iii. "You Can Learn"	9:27; 3:52; 2:07; 3:28
2.	"Reprogram the Gene": i. "Invincible"; ii. "Trouble-Free Life"; iii. "A Cure for Us?"	7:00; 3:31; 2:00; 1:29
3.	"Only a Kiss" (instrumental)	0:39
4.	"Murder Machines"	4:20
5.	"The Crow and the Nightingale"	6:35
6.	"Sierra Leone": i. "Chance in a Million"; ii. "The White Sand"; iii. "The Diamond"; iv. "The Blue Warm Air"; v. "More Than a Treasure"	10:51; 1:32; 0:53; 3:29; 2:23; 2:34
7.	"Care": i. "Maintenance Drugs"; ii. "An Hour Before It's Dark"; iii. "Every Cell"; iv. "Angels on Earth"	15:18; 4:37; 2:27; 3:18; 4:56
Total length:		54:10

Note: After 4 minutes of silence following "Angels on Earth", the CD will play a 12" remix of "Murder Machines".

== Personnel ==
Marillion

- Pete Trewavas – bass guitar, additional guitars, organ on "Care"
- Ian Mosley – drums
- Steve Rothery – electric and acoustic guitars, additional keyboards on "Care"
- Mark Kelly – keyboards
- Steve Hogarth – lead and backing vocals, keyboards

Additional musicians

- Bethan Bond – harp on "The Crow and the Nightingale", "Care"
- Luis Jardim – percussion on "Reprogram the Gene", "Murder Machines", "Sierra Leone", "Care"
- Kat Marsh – backing vocals on "Be Hard on Yourself", "Sierra Leone"
- Sam Morris – French horn on "Care"
- Choir Noir – backing vocals on "Murder Machines", "The Crow and the Nightingale", "Care"
- In Praise of Folly String Quartet – strings on "The Crow and the Nightingale"

Production

- Marillion – production
- Michael Hunter – production, recording, mixing
- Katie May – assistant engineering at Real World
- Christine Verschoren – string section engineering at Ace
- Johannah Churchill – photography
- Simon Ward – artwork

== Charts ==
Chart performance for An Hour Before It's Dark
Chart (2022)	Peak position
Austrian Albums (Ö3 Austria)	25
Belgian Albums (Ultratop Flanders)	11
Belgian Albums (Ultratop Wallonia)	7
Canadian Albums (Billboard)	93
Dutch Albums (Album Top 100)	2
Finnish Albums (Suomen virallinen lista)	38
French Albums (SNEP)	13
German Albums (Offizielle Top 100)	2
Irish Albums (IRMA)	58
Italian Albums (FIMI)	16
Japanese Albums (Oricon)	151
Norwegian Albums (VG-lista)	32
Polish Albums (ZPAV)	4
Scottish Albums (OCC)	2
Spanish Albums (Promusicae)	9
Swedish Albums (Sverigetopplistan)	29
Swiss Albums (Schweizer Hitparade)	6
UK Albums (OCC)	2
UK Independent Albums (OCC)	2
UK Rock & Metal Albums (OCC)	1
