= You're Gone (Marillion song) =

2004 single by Marillion

Single by Marillion

from the album Marbles
- Released: 19 April 2004
- Genre: Pop rock
- Length: 6:25 (album version); 4:05 (radio edit)
- Label: Intact Records
- Songwriters: Steve Hogarth, Steve Rothery, Mark Kelly, Pete Trewavas, Ian Mosley
- Producer: Dave Meegan

Marillion singles chronology
"Between You and Me" (2001)	"You're Gone" (2004)	"Don't Hurt Yourself" (2004)

You're Gone is the lead single from Marillion's 13th studio album Marbles, released in 2004. The song marked a comeback for the band, reaching number 7 on the UK Singles Chart and becoming their first top ten hit since 1987's "Incommunicado", as well as their highest charting single with Steve Hogarth as singer. It also made number 8 on the Dutch Single Top 100.

== Background and release ==
In the studio, singer Steve Hogarth was inspired by a chord sequence generated on a computer by guitarist Steve Rothery, and was able to fit a pre-written lyric around it. Hogarth has said, "It's a simple song. It's about losing a great light in your life and living in the shadow of it, and yet rejoicing in the fact that it was ever there – and it still is there, somewhere." "You're Gone" has been characterised as an address of "romantic disappointment".

Although the band's mainstream popularity had dissipated in the late 1990s, they retained a strong cult following. Three versions of the single (two CD versions and a DVD version) were promoted to mailing list subscribers, and the song's commercially friendly sound – including its then-current, U2-like feel – made it more accessible to mainstream audiences than previous Marillion singles. Despite "You're Gone" becoming the second-highest new entry of the week and generating renewed media interest in the band, they were denied an appearance on the BBC's flagship chart television show Top of the Pops, and were, according to Steve Rothery, dismissed by then-BBC presenter Jonathan Ross as "a prog rock band that sing about goblins". Rothery criticised Ross's archaic perception of the band, saying: "We recorded Script for a Jester's Tear 22 years ago. I think that was when Ross had his own hair."

The single included a live rendition of "Faith," an all-new song that was written during the sessions for Marbles but not released on an album until its follow-up Somewhere Else.

== Music video ==
A basic music video was created for the single, directed by The Boom Boom Boys. It largely features Hogarth delivering the song, with occasional shots of the band and minimal effect overlay.

== Charts ==
Chart (2004)	Peak position
Netherlands (Dutch Top 40)	32
Netherlands (Single Top 100)	8
UK Singles (Official Charts)	7
