= Made Again =

Live album by Marillion
- Released: 25 March 1996
- Recorded: September 1991, September 1995, April 1994
- Genre: Progressive rock; pop rock
- Length: 138:48
- Label: EMI, Raw Power
- Producer: Marillion

Marillion chronology
Afraid of Sunlight (1995)	Made Again (1996)	The Best of Both Worlds (1997)

Professional ratings
Review scores
Source	Rating
Guitarist	4/5 stars

Made Again is a 1996 double live album by Marillion, their first live recording with singer Steve Hogarth. The first disc contains material recorded in London on the Holidays in Eden tour (1991) and in Rotterdam on the Afraid of Sunlight tour (1995); the second disc consists of a full live version of the album Brave recorded in Paris in 1994. Outside of the UK, distribution would be handled by the then independent record label Castle Communications, who would also release the band's next three studio albums.

== Background ==
Made Again's format echoes that of the previous live album The Thieving Magpie (1988), which also documented a four studio-album period, contained a complete concept album on one disc (in that case, Misplaced Childhood), and marked the end of an era (Fish's departure). Made Again, in turn, was the final album Marillion released under their then-current contract with EMI Records.

== Reissues ==
The album has been reissued by Castle Communications in 2001 and by Sanctuary Records in 2006. In addition, all the full concerts from London, Paris, and Rotterdam have been remixed by Mike Hunter and included on the book-set reissues of Holidays in Eden, Brave and Afraid of Sunlight.

== Track listing ==
Disc one
No.	Title	Length
1.	"Splintering Heart"	6:33
2.	"Easter"	6:23
3.	"No One Can"	4:44
4.	"Waiting to Happen"	5:07
5.	"Cover My Eyes"	4:05
6.	"The Space"	6:34
7.	"Hooks In You"	3:01
8.	"Beautiful"	5:37
9.	"Kayleigh"	4:00
10.	"Lavender"	4:18
11.	"Afraid of Sunlight"	6:54
12.	"King"	7:25

Disc two
No.	Title	Length
1.	"Bridge"	3:25
2.	"Living with the Big Lie"	6:47
3.	"Runaway"	4:45
4.	"Goodbye to All That"	0:40
5.	"Wave"	1:21
6.	"Mad"	1:23
7.	"The Opium Den"	2:37
8.	"The Slide"	4:09
9.	"Standing in the Swing"	2:11
10.	"Hard As Love"	6:57
11.	"Hollow Man"	4:32
12.	"Alone Again in the Lap of Luxury"	6:43
13.	"Now Wash Your Hands"	1:14
14.	"Paper Lies"	5:33
15.	"Brave"	8:38
16.	"The Great Escape"	1:17
17.	"The Last of You"	2:41
18.	"Falling from the Moon"	3:27
19.	"Made Again"	5:24

== Recording sources ==
- Hammersmith Odeon, 29 September 1991 (Disc 1, tracks 1–6) (full concert released on Holidays in Eden Deluxe Edition)
- Rotterdam Ahoy, 29 September 1995 (Disc 1, 7–12) (full concert released on Afraid of Sunlight Deluxe Edition)
- La Cigale, 29 April 1994 (Disc 2) (full performance of Brave, also released on Brave Deluxe Edition)

== Personnel ==
- Steve Hogarth – vocals
- Steve Rothery – guitars
- Mark Kelly – keyboards
- Pete Trewavas – bass
- Ian Mosley – drums

== Charts ==
Chart (1966)	Peak position
UK Albums Chart	37
