= Somewhere Else (Marillion album) =

Studio album by Marillion
- Released: 9 April 2007
- Recorded: 2006
- Studio: The Racket Club (Buckinghamshire, England)
- Length: 52:07 (Note: Intact: INTACT CD11)
- Label: Intact
- Producer: Michael Hunter

Marillion chronology
Marbles (2004)	Somewhere Else (2007)	Happiness Is the Road (2008)

Singles from Somewhere Else
- 1. "See It Like a Baby" Released: 26 March 2007; 2. "Thankyou Whoever You Are" Released: 11 June 2007

Somewhere Else is the fourteenth studio album by British neo-prog band Marillion. It was released by the band's own label, Intact Records, in the United Kingdom on 9 April 2007. Produced by Michael Hunter, the album was recorded during 2006 at The Racket Club in Buckinghamshire, except the track "Faith", written during the Marbles sessions and recorded the previous year.

== Artwork ==
The album title was initially supposed to be 14 and a cover art was prepared to match with it. However, the name altered and a new artwork became necessary. The final variant of the cover featuring a tower viewer also known as coin-operated binoculars was designed by Carl Glover. It is quite similar to that of Weather Report's compilation album Forecast: Tomorrow. The band had been aware of this but since it occurred by accident they decided not to change anything.

== Release ==
=== Critical reception ===
Professional ratings
Review scores
Source	Rating
Uncut	3/5 stars

Stephen Dalton of Uncut, describing Somewhere Else in a 3 star (out of 5) review, stated that "some tracks chime and soar like Coldplay. Others are just a post-rock whimper away from Radiohead". Dalton concluded that "Marillion deserve a fair hearing". Richard Mann of Guitarist was less impressed, writing "with its bombastic production, meandering instrumentation and anthemic AOR choruses it's no doubt precisely the sort of thing owners of the other 13 albums by the band will lap up. But for the innocent bystander, there's really nothing to see here...Steve Rothery's guitars often seem weighed down with unnecessary effects from the Museum of Abandoned Guitar Sounds: the solos, usually a strong point, seem tossed off and inconsequential ... in places, the album's lyrics beggar belief." Mann concluded: "On 'Faith', the barely disguised aping of McCartney's 'Blackbird' fingerpicking offers the final proof that there's little invention left in the tank."

Classic Rock ranked the album number 24 on their end-of-year list for 2007.

=== Commercial performance ===
Somewhere Else peaked at number 24 on the UK Albums Chart, becoming Marillion's first to enter the Top 40 since Radiation (1998). The first single from the album was "See It Like a Baby", a download-only release, which made number 45 on the UK singles chart. Follow-up "Thankyou Whoever You Are" fared better, reaching number 15 and giving the band their third Top 20 hit of the 2000s and their second highest-charting single since 1987's "Incommunicado".

=== 2011 Madfish reissues ===
Unlike their previous two albums, Marillion did not ask fans to pre-order Somewhere Else before it was recorded because they did not need the money. This left some fans disappointed as there was no special edition available. However, a similar 36-page deluxe edition packaged in a digibook format with an additional artwork designed by Carl Glover (Note: Madfish: SMACD973) was issued on 25 April 2011 by the independent label Madfish, a division of Snapper Music. Moreover, a limited double vinyl edition featuring a modified track listing and three extra live tracks (Note: Madfish: SMALP973), taken from the live video Somewhere in London, was released by Madfish on 11 July 2011.

== Track listing ==
All lyrics are written by Steve Hogarth (except for "Most Toys" by Hogarth/Ale Dozal); all music is composed by Marillion.

No.	Title	Length
1.	"The Other Half"	4:23
2.	"See It Like a Baby"	4:32
3.	"Thankyou Whoever You Are"	4:51
4.	"Most Toys"	2:48
5.	"Somewhere Else"	7:51
6.	"A Voice from the Past"	6:22
7.	"No Such Thing"	3:58
8.	"The Wound"	7:18
9.	"The Last Century for Man"	5:52
10.	"Faith"	4:12
Total length:		52:07

Two tracks from the sessions were included on different editions of the single "Thankyou Whoever You Are": "Circular Ride" and "Say the Word". These two b-sides have not been included on any edition of the album so far.

=== 2011 Madfish 2xLP edition ===
Side one

1. "The Other Half"
2. "See It Like a Baby"
3. "Somewhere Else"

Side two

1. "Thankyou Whoever You"
2. "Most Toys"
3. "Last Century for Man"
4. "Faith"

"Thankyou Whoever You Are"
A sample of the chorus section of "Thankyou Whoever You Are" featuring Marillion's signature anthemic style

"Most Toys"
A sample of the chorus section of "Most Toys" featuring the band's lesser known rockier side

Side three

1. "A Voice from the Past"
2. "No Such Thing"
3. "The Wound"

Side four

1. "The Other Half (Live)"
2. "Somewhere Else (Live)"
3. "Voice from the Past (Live)"

== Personnel ==
=== Marillion ===
- Steve Hogarth – vocals, piano, and percussion
- Mark Kelly – keyboards
- Ian Mosley – drums
- Steve Rothery – guitars
- Pete Trewavas – bass, electric guitar, and acoustic guitar (on "Faith")

=== Additional musicians ===
- Sam Morris – French horn (on "Faith")

=== Technical ===
- Michael Hunter – production, recording, and mixing
- Peter Mew – mastering (at Abbey Road Studios)
- Carl Glover – design and photography

== Charts ==
=== Album ===
Chart (2007)	Peak position
Dutch Albums (Album Top 100)	18
French Albums (SNEP)	59
German Albums (Offizielle Top 100)	36
Italian Albums (FIMI)	47
Swiss Albums (Schweizer Hitparade)	83
UK Albums (OCC)	24

=== Singles ===
"See It Like a Baby"
Chart (2007)	Peak position
UK Singles (OCC)	45

"Thank You Whoever You Are"
Chart (2007)	Peak position
Netherlands (Single Top 100)	6
UK Singles (OCC)	15

== Release history ==
Region	Date	Label	Version	Format	Catalog
United Kingdom	9 April 2007	Intact	Standard	CD	INTACT CD11
Germany	13 April 2007	Intact	Standard	CD	INTACT CD11
North America	24 April 2007	MVD Audio	Standard	CD	INTACT CD11
Europe	25 April 2011	Madfish	Deluxe	CD	SMACD973
Europe	11 July 2011	Madfish	Limited	LP	SMALP973
