= Fuck Everyone and Run (F E A R) =

Studio album by Marillion
- Released: 23 September 2016
- Recorded: 2014–2016
- Studio: The Racket Club, Buckinghamshire, England; Real World, Box, Wiltshire, England
- Genre: Neo-prog
- Length: 68:10
- Label: Intact; earMUSIC
- Producer: Michael Hunter

Marillion chronology
Sounds That Can't Be Made (2012)	Fuck Everyone and Run (F E A R) (2016)	With Friends from the Orchestra (2019)

Singles from Fuck Everyone And Run (F E A R)
- 1. "The New Kings" Released: 8 July 2017; 2. "Living in F E A R" Released: 21 September 2017

Professional ratings
Review scores
Source	Rating
AllMusic	4/5 stars
Classic Rock	4/5 stars
The Guardian	5/5 stars

Fuck Everyone and Run (F E A R) is the eighteenth studio album by the British neo-prog band Marillion, released in 2016.

== Production ==
As with many of their recent recordings, Marillion, who are widely considered crowdfunding pioneers, turned to their fans to finance the new album. This time the group decided to join the online direct-to-fan music platform PledgeMusic in order to expand their management and customer service possibilities. The pre-order campaign was launched on 1 September 2015 and by 6 October fans from 67 countries pledged to buy the album. The money received enabled Marillion to tour across South America in May 2016 and North America in October 2016. The album was recorded between 2014 and 2016 at the group's own Racket Club Studios in Buckinghamshire, as well as at Peter Gabriel's Real World Studios in Wiltshire, where Marillion spent a week in the end of the winter in 2016. On 7 April 2016, the band revealed the cover art and announced the album title as Fuck Everyone and Run (F E A R).

Singer Steve Hogarth commented on the title, saying,

”This title is adopted not in anger or with any intention to shock. It is adopted and sung (in the song "New Kings”) tenderly, in sadness and resignation inspired by an England, and a world, which increasingly functions on an “Every man for himself” philosophy. I won’t bore you with examples, they’re all over the newspapers every day. There’s a sense of foreboding that permeates much of this record. I have a feeling that we’re approaching some kind of sea-change in the world – an irreversible political, financial, humanitarian and environmental storm. I hope that I’m wrong. I hope that my FEAR of what “seems” to be approaching is just that, and not FEAR of what “is” actually about to happen.”

== Release ==
On 7 July, customers of the PledgeMusic campaign received access to download the song suite The New Kings, and an edited version of the song was made available to the public on Marillion's YouTube channel.

The campaign offered various options of pre-ordering the album—called only by the code name M18 at that time—including CD, download only, and a limited Ultimate Edition box, containing, among others, a Blu-ray Disc containing a making-of-the-album film. Originally the album was slated to be released on 1 May 2016, but was later postponed to 9 September, and again to 23 September. Fuck Everyone and Run (F E A R) was released as a standard CD, a multi-channel Super Audio CD, and also as a 33 1/3 rpm double-vinyl LP with a slightly different track order. A special limited golden vinyl version of the album was released for Record Store Day 2017 on 22 April.

The album peaked at #4 in the UK, marking the band's highest chart position since Clutching at Straws in 1987 and their first top ten album since Brave in 1994.

== Track listing ==
All tracks are written by Marillion.

No.	Title	Length
1.	"El Dorado"; I. "Long-Shadowed Sun"; II. "The Gold"; III. "Demolished Lives"; IV. "F E A R"; V. "The Grandchildren of Apes"	16:46; 1:26; 6:13; 2:24; 4:08; 2:35
2.	"Living in F E A R"	6:25
3.	"The Leavers"; I. "Wake Up in Music"; II. "The Remainers"; III. "Vapour Trails in the Sky"; IV. "The Jumble of Days"; V. "One Tonight"	19:08; 4:27; 1:35; 4:49; 4:20; 3:56
4.	"White Paper"	7:19
5.	"The New Kings"; I. "Fuck Everyone and Run"; II. "Russia's Locked Doors"; III. "A Scary Sky"; IV. "Why Is Nothing Ever True?"	16:45; 4:22; 6:25; 2:34; 3:24
6.	"Tomorrow's New Country"	1:47
Total length:		68:10

=== 2xLP edition ===
Side one

1. "El Dorado"

Side two

1. "Living in F E A R"
2. "White Paper"

Side three

1. "The Leavers"

Side four

1. "The New Kings"
2. "Tomorrow's New Country"

== Personnel ==
=== Marillion ===
- Steve Hogarth – lead vocals, hammered dulcimer (on "The New Kings"), bass xylophone (on "The Leavers")
- Steve Rothery – guitar, additional fretless bass on "White Paper"
- Pete Trewavas – bass, additional vocals
- Mark Kelly – keyboards
- Ian Mosley – drums

=== Additional musicians ===
- Sofi Hogarth – additional vocals on "El Dorado", "The Leavers", and "The New Kings"
- Jennie Rothery – additional vocals on "The Leavers"
- Eleanor Gilchrist – violin
- Geraldine Berreen – violin
- Teresa Whipple – viola
- Abigail Trundle – cello

=== Technical personnel ===
- Michael Hunter – producer, mixing engineer
- Simon Ward – artwork, design

== Charts ==
Chart (2016)	Peak position
Austrian Albums (Ö3 Austria)	43
Belgian Albums (Ultratop Flanders)	26
Belgian Albums (Ultratop Wallonia)	21
Dutch Albums (Album Top 100)	6
French Albums (SNEP)	14
German Albums (Offizielle Top 100)	10
Irish Albums (IRMA)	27
Italian Albums (FIMI)	14
Japanese Albums (Oricon)	185
Polish Albums (ZPAV)	8
Scottish Albums (Official Charts)	4
Spanish Albums (Promusicae)	88
Swedish Albums (Sverigetopplistan)	17
Swiss Albums (Schweizer Hitparade)	15
UK Albums (Official Charts)	4
