= Happiness Is the Road =

- Double-album cover

Studio album by Marillion
- Released: 20 October 2008 (physical release)
- Recorded: 2007/2008
- Studio: The Racket Club (Buckinghamshire)
- Genre: Neo-prog, pop rock, alternative rock
- Length: 108:06
- Label: Intact Records; EMI (CD only)
- Producer: Michael Hunter & Marillion

Marillion chronology
Somewhere Else (2007)	Happiness Is the Road (2008)	Early Stages (2008)

Alternative cover
- Volume 1: Essence cover

Alternative cover
- Volume 2: The Hard Shoulder cover

Singles from Happiness Is the Road
- 1. "Whatever Is Wrong With You" Released: 1 October 2008 (download only)

Professional ratings
Review scores
Source	Rating
AllMusic	3.5/5 stars
Classic Rock	9/10 stars

Happiness Is the Road is Marillion's 15th studio album, released in 2008 as two separate album-length volumes respectively titled Essence and The Hard Shoulder. The overall playing time is 110 minutes (116 including a hidden track), taking it to double album length.

The album sees Marillion experimenting with a host of new instruments, including dulcimers, glockenspiels, a harmonium, French horns and even sleigh bells, a harp and zither. The title track "Happiness Is the Road" was inspired by Eckhart Tolle's book The Power of Now. The album's artwork was created by the Spanish artist Antonio Seijas in co-operation with Marillion's long-time designer Carl Glover.

== Formats ==
It is available in various formats: Two separate jewel case CDs, high-quality (256 kbit/s) download (by purchasing "Front Row Club" credits at their web page), standard-quality download (128 kbit/s) (legally available on file-sharing networks), and a "deluxe campaign edition" containing both CDs and special artwork (see below). In most of the world, initially the physical formats were only available via mail-order from the band's website; only in the US and Poland has the album been available in retail shops from the start. However, when only about a third of the expected sales were achieved via mail-order, Marillion decided to release a worldwide retail version distributed by EMI. This version has been available since 2 February 2009.

In December 2009, the album was made available on vinyl, consisting of two double LPs pressed at 45 rpm rather than the usual 33 1/3 rpm. Both LPs were specifically mastered for vinyl, and only 2000 copies of each (Volume 1: Essence and Volume 2: The Hard Shoulder) were pressed. The track listing on Volume 1: Essence was identical to the CD, but the track listing in Volume 2: The Hard Shoulder differed greatly from the CD and included hitherto unreleased live versions of "Nothing Fills the Hole" and "Woke Up" to close the LP.

On 6 October 2017, after being long out of print on vinyl, both volumes were re-released on 180-gram vinyl by Madfish, this time with the usual 33 1/3 rpm.

== Promotional activities ==
The recording was financed by pre-ordering, which asked fans to order about a year in advance. In return, buyers would receive a special edition box-set with book-style special artwork containing both volumes. The band had used the same approach with the albums Anoraknophobia (2001) and Marbles (2004). As with Marbles, the names of everyone who pre-ordered before a certain date are listed in the special edition.

"Real Tears for Sale" first appeared in the band's live set in late 2007, almost a year before the album release. It is one of seven songs that had been written earlier and were already recorded during the Somewhere Else sessions; the others are "A State of Mind", "Trap the Spark", "Older Than Me", "Throw Me Out", "Half the World" and "Especially True". As often with Marillion, the tracks' roots are even older (a part of "This Train is My Life" goes back to the 1999 marillion.com sessions and many songs were worked on during the Marbles sessions).

The first single ("Whatever Is Wrong With You") was released as a download, and fans were invited to enter a competition to make their own video to the track. Videos were to be uploaded to YouTube and the video with the most views by 1 December 2008 won £5000. In addition, there was a further £5000 prize for the video judged by the band to be the best.

Marillion made the album available for free on peer-to-peer file sharing networks as 128 kbit/s WMA files. When any of these tracks is first played, a pop-up box appears asking listeners to give the band their email address in return. This was used to contact downloaders with offers on Marillion merchandise. Everyone who submitted their e-mail address is also given the option to download the tracks as 128 kbit/s MP3 files without DRM, but is asked not to share these on any networks.

== Influence ==
Hogarth said in 2009:

"During the 'Somewhere Else' tour I was suffering with my health. It was self-induced really. I wasn't eating properly and was also under a lot of stress both within my domestic situation [recent divorce] and professionally [on tour]. My body eventually rebelled and although I won't go into gory details, I ended up needing surgery. I was referred to a doctor in Utrecht, Holland who performed a minor operation (on the afternoon of the Utrecht show!). The doctor was also a healer and after the surgical procedure, he held his hands over me. I noticed that there were tears running down his face during this, and afterwards he told me that the tears were mine, not his. He had felt much of the guilt, regret and consequent pain that I was carrying and he said he would recommend a book that I must read. He wrote the name of the book on his prescription pad and gave it to me. "Read that! It will make you better," he said. The book is The Power of Now by Eckart Tolle. I bought the book and read it slowly. Much of what it contains resonated with my own thoughts and instincts and it crystallized my own ideas of the meaning of life. I would recommend the book to everyone. 'Essence' is directly influenced by the book, although much of what I have written was written before I read it. The theme of the 'Essence' CD is life's journey, time and it's passing, and the meaning of life."

== Track listing ==
The album was originally scheduled to be just a single album. Those tracks became "Volume 2: The Hard Shoulder." In the middle of the recording sessions, the band experienced a major bit of inspiration and songwriting. They decided to follow their instincts, and wound up producing what would eventually become "Volume 1: Essence." These tracks hang together loosely as a concept, and are much mellower than the harder rocking -and non-conceptual- Volume 2. Fans were treated to double the material, and two completely different vibes for their investment.

All music written by Marillion, lyrics by Steve Hogarth

=== Volume 1: Essence ===
1. "Dreamy Street" – 2:02
2. "This Train Is My Life" – 4:50
3. "Essence" – 6:29
4. "Wrapped Up in Time" – 5:06
5. "Liquidity" – 2:12
6. "Nothing Fills the Hole" – 3:23
7. "Woke Up" – 3:40
8. "Trap the Spark" – 5:43
9. "A State of Mind" – 4:33
10. "Happiness Is the Road" – 10:05
11. (blank) – 1:59
12. "Half-Full Jam" – 6:48 (hidden track)

Track 12 is listed as Half-Empty Jam on the download version, but was changed just prior to the CD release of the album. This could be seen as a play on words, as the lyrics of the song begin with "I used to be half empty, but now I'm half full..." Track 11 does not appear on the download version.

=== Volume 2: The Hard Shoulder ===
1. "Thunder Fly" – 6:24
2. "The Man from the Planet Marzipan" – 7:55
3. "Asylum Satellite #1" – 9:32
4. "Older Than Me" – 3:11
5. "Throw Me Out" – 4:01
6. "Half the World" – 5:08
7. "Whatever Is Wrong with You" – 4:16
8. "Especially True" – 4:37
9. "Real Tears for Sale" – 7:34

=== Volume 1: Essence – Vinyl edition ===
Side one

1. "Dreamy Street" – 2:02
2. "This Train Is My Life" – 4:50
3. "Essence" – 6:29

Side two

1. "Wrapped Up in Time" – 5:06
2. "Liquidity" – 2:12
3. "Nothing Fills the Hole" – 3:23
4. "Woke Up" – 3:40

Side three

1. "Trap the Spark" – 5:43
2. "A State of Mind" – 4:33

Side four

1. "Happiness Is the Road" – 10:05
2. "Half-Full Jam" – 6:48

=== Volume 2: The Hard Shoulder – Vinyl edition ===
Side one

1. "The Man from the Planet Marzipan" – 7:55
2. "Asylum Satellite #1" – 9:32

Side two

1. "Thunder Fly" – 6:24
2. "Whatever Is Wrong with You" – 4:16
3. "Especially True" – 4:37

Side three

1. "Older Than Me" – 3:11
2. "Throw Me Out" – 4:01
3. "Half the World" – 5:08

Side four

1. "Real Tears for Sale" – 7:34
2. "Nothing Fills the Hole" / "Woke Up" (Live in Cologne) – 7:32

== Personnel ==
=== Band members ===
- Steve Hogarth – vocals, keyboards
- Mark Kelly – keyboards, backing vocals
- Ian Mosley – drums
- Steve Rothery – guitars
- Pete Trewavas – bass guitar, backing vocals, guitars, clarinet on "Throw Me Out"

=== Additional musicians ===
- Sam Morris – French horn on "Real Tears For Sale"
- S. Claydon – Arco Bass
- S. Audley – Dulcimer
- P. Bisset – "Additional Tuned Percussion"
- Jon Hotten – "Overworked Tambourine"
- Emil Hogarth – "Ultrasound Heartbeat" on "Dreamy Street"
- Dawn Roberts – Finger Cymbal on "Essence"

=== Production ===
- Produced by Michael Hunter and Marillion
- Recorded and Mixed by Michael Hunter
- Assistant Engineers: Roderick Brunton, Jon Cameron
- Mastered by Simon Heyworth
- Artwork and Photography by Antonio Seijas
- Graphic design and Layout by Carl Glover
