= Marbles (album) =

Studio album by Marillion
- Released: 27 April 2004 (preorder); 3 May 2004
- Recorded: 2002–early 2004
- Studio: The Racket Club (Aylesbury)
- Genre: Progressive rock, art rock
- Length: 98:48 (2CD version); 68:11 (1CD version)
- Label: Intact
- Producer: Dave Meegan

Marillion chronology
Anoraknophobia (2001)	Marbles (2004)	Somewhere Else (2007)

Singles from Marbles
- 1. "You're Gone" Released: 19 April 2004; 2. "Don't Hurt Yourself" Released: July 2004

Marbles is the 13th studio album from rock band Marillion, released in 2004. Unlike their previous studio album, Anoraknophobia (2001), which was financed largely by a preorder campaign, the band funded the recording, and it was the publicity campaign that fans financed for the album. Those fans who pre-ordered the album received an exclusive 2-CD "Deluxe Campaign Edition" with a booklet containing the names of everyone who pre-ordered before a certain date. The public release date of the retail single-CD version of the album was 3 May 2004 while a plain 2-CD version was made available from the band's website. A limited (500 copy) edition was released on white multicoloured vinyl by Racket Records on 13 November 2006.

In 2011, the 2-CD version became available as a retail edition in a mediabook by the Madfish label, reissued in 2017 as a simpler digipak edition. Madfish also released the full album on vinyl for the first time, occupying three LPs. Another reissue of the CD appeared in 2021 on Kscope.

The album did not chart in the UK, due to it being packaged with a couple of stickers, which is against chart rules. So despite selling enough for a top 30 position, the album was declared ineligible for the album chart; however, its first single "You're Gone", reached #7 in the UK Singles Chart, thus becoming their first UK top ten hit since 1987's "Incommunicado". The follow-up single "Don't Hurt Yourself" peaked at #16. Classic Rock ranked Marbles #11 on their end-of-year list for 2004. The album is ranked at #53 on Prog Magazine's list of the Top 100 Prog Albums of All Time.

== Concept and reception ==
Professional ratings
Review scores
Source	Rating
Allmusic	3/5 stars
The Guardian	3/5 stars
Record Collector	3/5 stars
Classic Rock	4/5 stars
Guitarist	4/5 stars

Marbles was the second Marillion album in a row produced by Dave Meegan, who had already helped the band craft Brave and Afraid of Sunlight, albums to which Marbles was compared by both reviewers as well as the band itself. Unlike Anoraknophobia though, Marbles was mostly not mixed by Meegan but Mike Hunter. Exceptions are "The Invisible Man", "Fantastic Place", "Ocean Cloud", "You're Gone" (mixed by Meegan), "Genie" (mixed by Steven Wilson) and "Angelina" (mixed by Meegan and Wilson).

While Marbles is not strictly a concept album, it is tied together by thematic threads. Several of the songs are connected via segues or crossfades. The four parts of the title track work as musical interludes, but they also tell a continuing story about the narrator's childhood fascination with marbles, collecting them and losing most of them over the years. ("Losing one's marbles" is slang term for going insane, which has also been described as a theme of "The Invisible Man".) Furthermore, the song "The Damage" includes multiple lyrical call-backs to "Genie"; "Ocean Cloud" mentions "the invisible man" and in a key moment of "Neverland", the line "you're gone" appears.

According to Steve Hogarth, escape is a recurring theme on the album.

"Ocean Cloud" is inspired by and dedicated to Don Allum and the Ocean Rowers, even including a link to Allum's at-sea diary and actual samples of him talking about the experience.

== Track listing ==
All songs written by Steve Hogarth, Steve Rothery, Mark Kelly, Pete Trewavas, Ian Mosley. All lyrics by Steve Hogarth.

Disc one

1. "The Invisible Man" – 13:37
2. "Marbles I" – 1:42
3. "Genie"* – 4:54
4. "Fantastic Place" – 6:12
5. "The Only Unforgivable Thing"* – 7:13
6. "Marbles II" – 2:02
7. "Ocean Cloud"* – 17:58

Disc two

1. "Marbles III" – 1:51
2. "The Damage"* – 4:35
3. "Don't Hurt Yourself" – 5:48
4. "You're Gone" – 6:25
5. "Angelina" – 7:42
6. "Drilling Holes" – 5:11
7. "Marbles IV" – 1:26
8. "Neverland" – 12:10

Tracks marked * are not on the single CD and double vinyl editions of the album.

=== Single-CD version and double LP ===
1. "The Invisible Man" – 13:37
2. "Marbles I" – 1:42
3. "You're Gone" – 6:25
4. "Angelina" – 7:42
5. "Marbles II" – 2:02
6. "Don't Hurt Yourself" – 5:48
7. "Fantastic Place" – 6:12
8. "Marbles III" – 1:51
9. "Drilling Holes" – 5:11
10. "Marbles IV" – 1:26
11. "Neverland" – 12:10
12. CD bonus track (in Europe): "You're Gone" (single mix) – 4:05
12. CD bonus track (in North America): "Don't Hurt Yourself" (music video)

=== Marbles Live (2004) ===
On the 2004 tour, the band played the single disc version of Marbles (however with "Drilling Holes" exchanged for "The Damage"). A recording of this made at the Astoria in London was released as the live CD Marbles Live and the DVD Marbles on the Road. The CD edition contains "Estonia" (originally on This Strange Engine) as an encore.

=== Marbles By The Sea (2005) ===
At the Marillion Weekend in 2005, the band played all fifteen tracks of Marbles but with a revised order ("The Damage" appearing in the place of "Ocean Cloud", which was performed after "Neverland"). This was released as a double CD called Marbles by the Sea.

=== Marbles In The Park (2015) ===
In 2015, from Friday March 20 to Sunday March 22 the Marillion Weekend took place at Center Parcs, Port Zélande, The Netherlands. On the Saturday night Marillion performed the 2CD edition of Marbles in its entirety and in original order. The show was released as a two-CD set and as a DVD or Blu-Ray, both as a standalone release as well as part of the Racket Records Out of the Box three-disc set, named after a line that appears in "Genie" and "The Damage".

Encores were "Out Of This World" (originally on Afraid of Sunlight), "King" (originally on Afraid of Sunlight) and "Sounds That Can't Be Made" (originally appeared on Sounds That Can't Be Made)

== Personnel ==
- Steve Hogarth – vocals, hammered dulcimer on "The Invisible Man", additional guitar on "Fantastic Place"
- Mark Kelly – keyboards
- Ian Mosley – drums
- Steve Rothery – guitar, bass guitar on "Don't Hurt Yourself"
- Pete Trewavas – bass guitar, acoustic guitar on "Don't Hurt Yourself" and "Drilling Holes"
- Carrie Tree – additional vocals on "Genie" and "Angelina"

== Charts ==
Chart (2004)	Peak position
Dutch Albums (Album Top 100)	42
French Albums (SNEP)	68
German Albums (Offizielle Top 100)	56
Italian Albums (FIMI)	58
