= Brave (1994 film) =

1994 English musical film

- Directed by: Richard Stanley
- Written by: Steve Hogarth; Richard Stanley
- Produced by: Richard McGill
- Starring: Josie Ayers; Russell Copley; Raymond Sawyer; Anthony Story; Jemma Davies
- Cinematography: Adam Rodgers
- Edited by: Lisa Harney
- Music by: Marillion
- Release date: 1994
- Running time: 50 minutes
- Language: English

Brave is a 1994 musical film directed by Richard Stanley and based on the 1994 concept album Brave by English progressive rock band Marillion.

== History and production ==
In 1994, Marillion released their seventh studio album Brave. A concept album inspired by a news story singer/lyricist Steve Hogarth had heard about an amnesiac girl found wandering the Severn Bridge, the album follows a fictional account of the girl's life and the events that led her there. After the release of the album, Marillion expressed a desire to create a video out of the album's concept in a manner comparable to Pink Floyd's The Wall.

Cult film director Richard Stanley, intrigued by the concept, agreed to sign on as the project's director. He disassociates himself from the film. Mark Kelly said in an interview 2013: "It took me to a website that had an interview with Richard Stanley, who was the director of our Brave movie. I didn't know this, but apparently he basically said, "I disown that piece of work because they took what was a short piece of film and turned it into something much longer." I suppose there is some truth in that, in the sense that he was working with a very small budget – I say "small budget", it was about £100k – to try to make a movie that covered 70 minutes, which is the Brave album. It was more than the budget could cope with, if you know what I mean. But anyway, I think working with Richard Stanley is probably the closest we've ever come to devil's music, he's definitely got a bit of the devil in him, cos he's made some really dark films."

Kelly said to Dave Everley in Classic Rock Magazine: "It wasn't a good film to be honest. I'm not blaming Stanley, because the budget he had to work with was minuscule. It could have worked really well with him making that movie. It just didn't."

The music videos for Brave's three singles - "The Great Escape", "Hollow Man" and "Alone Again in the Lap of Luxury" - were taken from this film. The run time of the film is 57 minutes; both the original VHS release and the 2004 re-issue on DVD additionally include a 30 minutes "making-of" documentary.

== Plot ==
The film tells the story in pictures accompanied by the entire Brave record minus "Paper Lies" and the final song "Made Again". On the recording, it is left ambiguous as to whether the main character, played by Josie Ayers, commits suicide in the end. In the film, she does. Thus, "Made Again", which concludes the story on the record as a happy ending of sorts, is not included.

On the back of the cover of the videocassette, the description reads as follows:

Brave.. The Movie is a fifty-minute concept film directed by cult movie director Richard Stanley. It is Stanley's stark vision of a young life in the 90's inspired by Marillion's album of the same name, which centres around a teenage girl who is found wandering in a state of amnesia on the Severn Bridge, and her consequent search for her past. Although this story bears similarities to actual recorded incidents in the history of the Severn Bridge we wish to stress that this is a work of fiction.

On the bottom of the cover, the final lines are:

"Watch it loud with the lights off."

== Tracks ==
1. "Bridge"
2. "Living with the Big Lie"
3. "Runaway"
4. "Goodbye to All That"
  1. "The Opium Den"
  2. "The Slide"
  3. "Standing in the Swing"
5. "Hard as Love"
6. "The Hollow Man"
7. "Alone Again in the Lap of Luxury"
8. "Brave"
9. "The Great Escape (Spiral Remake)"
10. "The Great Escape (Orchestral)"
11. "The Making of Brave" (Documentary)
