= Brave (Marillion album) =

Studio album by Marillion
- Released: 7 February 1994; 17 October 1998 (two-disc edition)
- Recorded: February–August 1993
- Studios: Château de Marouatte (Grand-Brassac); Parr Street Studios (Liverpool)
- Genres: Rock, progressive rock
- Length: 71:08 (single-disc edition); 123:01 (two-disc edition)
- Labels: EMI (Europe); I.R.S. Records (United States)
- Producer: Dave Meegan

Marillion chronology
A Singles Collection (1992)	Brave (1994)	Afraid of Sunlight (1995)

Singles from Brave
- 1. "The Great Escape" Released: 10 January 1994; 2. "The Hollow Man" Released: 14 March 1994; 3. "Alone Again in the Lap of Luxury" Released: 25 April 1994

Professional ratings
Review scores
Source	Rating
AllMusic	4.5/5 stars

Brave is the seventh studio album by Marillion, released in 1994. It charted at number 10 on the UK Albums Chart, being the last of the band's albums to reach the Top 10 in the United Kingdom until F E A R reached number 4 in 2016. The album is ranked at No. 29 on Prog Magazine's "Top 100 Prog Albums of All Time."

== Background ==
After trying and failing to reach a wider audience with the more pop-oriented Holidays in Eden, Marillion decided to go back to their roots and make a progressive-oriented album again.

In the mid-eighties, Steve Hogarth heard an appeal on behalf of the police on a local radio broadcast about a teen-aged girl found wandering alone on Severn Bridge in England. When she was found, she was either incapable of or decided not to communicate with anyone who questioned her. The police decided to make an appeal on radio to see if anyone could identify her. Eventually, the girl was reclaimed by her family and taken back home. Hogarth made a note of this and kept it aside for many years until Marillion began working on what would later become their Brave album.

The band had written two songs "Living with the Big Lie" and "Runaway" when he was reminded of the girl on the bridge and the shape of the album began to happen in his mind. "Living with the Big Lie" is a song about how people seem to get used to things to the point of being totally desensitised and "Runaway" catalogues the plight of a young girl attempting to escape a dysfunctional home. Hogarth told the story to the band and suggested how the songs could tie together in a fictitious tale of a life that has undergone problems and horrors such as sexual abuse (an increasingly reported theme in the media at the time), isolation, drug addiction and breakdown, to the point of considering/attempting suicide.

== Recording ==
The band recruited Dave Meegan as producer, who had previously worked with them as an assistant engineer on Fugazi (1984). EMI wanted the band to do a "quick record" to gain some revenue, but this project progressively escalated, taking the band nine months to write and produce, partly because Meegan would go through 'every single new tape made every day' each night listening for any riff or melody that sounded good enough to be included on the album. The album was written at the Racket Club, Buckinghamshire between April 1992 and January 1993 and recorded between February and September 1993.

The band relocated to Marouatte Castle in France for the duration of the recording of Brave. The influence of these surroundings can be heard throughout the album in a haunting atmospherics. They even went into a cave which lay in the nearby area and taped cave sounds which were used as background ambiance on the album. This recording concept was later used by Marillion's EMI labelmates Radiohead for their OK Computer album. They spent three months in Marouatte in total, but decamped that summer to Liverpool's Parr Street Studio to continue recording for another four months. The mixing of the album was finished at the Sarm West Studio in London.

== Release ==
Three singles from the album were released: "The Great Escape" was only released in the Netherlands in January 1994. "The Hollow Man", released in March 1994, reached No.30 in the UK, and "Alone Again in the Lap of Luxury", released in April 1994, didn’t even make the Top 50.

The double-LP vinyl release of Brave features a double groove on the final side of the album, providing two endings to the story of this concept album. The first groove plays "The Great Escape" as heard on the CD, followed by "Made Again", providing the happy ending; the second groove plays "The Great Escape (Spiral Remake)" and 7 minutes of water noise, providing the downer ending. "The Great Escape (Spiral Remake)" was later included as a bonus track on the remastered re-issue, along with one minute of the water noise.

Richard Stanley directed a 50-minute film version of Brave which was released 6 February 1995. This film takes the downer ending presented by the second double groove.

== Live ==
The Brave World Tour started in Liverpool at the Royal Court Theatre on 20 February 1994, and ended with two shows in Mexico City in September. On the Brave World Tour, the band played their new album from start to finish, with Hogarth acting out characters from the songs. This involved putting on lipstick to play the girl herself in 'Goodbye to All That', tying his hair into pigtails, and two men in balaclavas dragging him off stage at the end of 'Hard as Love'. Drummer Ian Mosley said in 2018, "The atmosphere in the concert halls was, like, 'Fucking hell, what's all this?' When we came on and did the encore and played songs that weren't from Brave, it was a completely different show. You could physically see people sigh with relief." They have revisited the whole album twice during the years, playing it in full in 2002 and again in 2013 at the Marillion Weekends.

== Critical reception ==
The album, which mixed classic symphonic progressive rock with standard rock, was ranked by Raw as one of the 20 greatest albums of 1994. In 2000 it was selected by Classic Rock as one of the "30 Best Albums of the 90s", and by the same publication in 2003 as one of "Rock's 30 Greatest Concept Albums".

"We lost a lot of fans on Brave," said Hogarth in 2018. "It wasn't well received. Everybody now looks back and goes, 'What a great album.' But nobody was saying that the day it came out." Rothery added, "I think it needed at least a year or two after its release before people saw it for what it was."

== Track listing ==
All music by Steve Hogarth/Steve Rothery/Mark Kelly/Pete Trewavas/Ian Mosley. All lyrics by Hogarth except as indicated.

=== Vinyl edition ===
Side one

1. "Bridge" – 2:55
2. "Living with the Big Lie" – 6:46
3. "Runaway" (Hogarth/John Helmer) – 4:40
4. "Goodbye to All That" – 0:49

Side two

1. "Goodbye to All That (continued)" – 11:51
  1. "(i) Wave"
  2. "(ii) Mad"
  3. "(iii) The Opium Den"
  4. "(iv) The Slide"
  5. "(v) Standing in the Swing"
2. "Hard as Love" (Hogarth/Helmer) – 6:41
3. "The Hollow Man" – 4:08

Side three

1. "Alone Again in the Lap of Luxury" – 8:13
  1. "(i) Now wash your hands"
2. "Paper Lies" (Hogarth/Helmer) – 5:47
3. "Brave" – 7:56

Side four, groove one

1. "The Great Escape" (Hogarth/Helmer) – 6:30
  1. "(i) The Last of You"
  2. "(ii) Fallin' from the Moon"
2. "Made Again" (Helmer) – 5:02

Side four, groove two

1. "The Great Escape (Spiral Remake)" (Hogarth/Helmer) – 4:38
2. "[unlisted water noises]" – 6:54

=== CD edition ===
1. "Bridge" – 2:52
2. "Living with the Big Lie" – 6:46
3. "Runaway" – 4:41
4. "Goodbye to All That" – 12:26
  1. "i) Wave"
  2. "ii) Mad"
  3. "iii) The Opium Den"
  4. "iv) The Slide"
  5. "v) Standing in the Swing"
5. "Hard as Love" – 6:42
6. "The Hollow Man" – 4:08
7. "Alone Again in the Lap of Luxury" – 8:13
  1. "i) Now Wash Your Hands"
8. "Paper Lies" – 5:49
9. "Brave" – 7:54
10. "The Great Escape" – 6:29
  1. "i) The Last of You"
  2. "ii) Fallin' from the Moon"
11. "Made Again" – 5:02

=== Remastered CD bonus tracks ===
1. "The Great Escape" (orchestral version) – 5:18
2. "Marouatte Jam" – 9:44
3. "The Hollow Man" (Acoustic) – 4:10
4. "Winter Trees" – 1:47
5. "Alone Again in the Lap of Luxury" (Acoustic) – 2:43
6. "Runaway" (Acoustic) – 4:27
7. "Hard as Love" (Instrumental) – 6:48
8. "Living with the Big Lie" (Demo) – 5:12
9. "Alone Again in the Lap of Luxury" (Demo) – 3:17
10. "Dream Sequence" (Demo) – 2:36
11. "The Great Escape" (Spiral Remake) – 5:48

The second CD also includes a hidden track. Some 26 minutes after "The Great Escape" there is an "instrumental" recording of Scott Joplin's "The Entertainer", followed by a snatch of studio chatter.

== Formats and re-issues ==
The album was originally released on cassette, double-vinyl LP and CD. In 1998, as part of a series of Marillion's first eight studio albums, EMI re-released Brave with remastered sound and a second disc containing bonus material, listed above. The remastered edition was later also made available without the bonus disc.

A new 180-gram vinyl pressing was released in May 2013 by EMI. It was identical to the original vinyl release from 1994, and included the double-grooved Side 4.

Brave was reissued in 2018 as the second in a series of deluxe box set editions of the eight albums the band made for EMI between 1982 and 1995. It is available in 4CD/Blu-Ray and 5LP vinyl box set form, both issued by Parlophone / RHINO on 9 March. The CD/BD version includes both the original stereo mix, new stereo and 5.1 mixes, and the complete live performance from Paris in April 1994, previously partially released on Made Again, newly mixed by Michael Hunter. The vinyl set includes the new stereo mix and the Paris show recording. The re-mix was done by Steven Wilson, who is a good friend of the band.

== Personnel ==
Marillion

- Steve Hogarth – vocals, additional keyboards & percussion, backing vocals
- Steve Rothery – guitars
- Mark Kelly – keyboards, backing vocals
- Pete Trewavas – bass, backing vocals
- Ian Mosley – drums

Additional musicians

- Tony Halligan – Uilleann pipes
- Liverpool Philharmonic – cellos & flute
- Darryl Way – orchestral arrangement on "Fallin' from the Moon"

Technical

- Dave Meegan – producer, engineer
- Chris Hedge – assistant engineer
- Michael Hunter – assistant engineer
- Steven Wilson – 2018 re-mix

== Charts ==
=== Weekly charts ===
Chart (1994)	Peak position
Belgian Albums (Ultratop Flanders)	176
Dutch Albums (Album Top 100)	7
Finnish Albums (The Official Finnish Charts)	26
German Albums (Offizielle Top 100)	17
Scottish Albums (Official Charts)	64
Swedish Albums (Sverigetopplistan)	25
Swiss Albums (Schweizer Hitparade)	21
UK Albums (Official Charts)	10

Chart (1996)	Peak position
UK Rock & Metal Albums (Official Charts)	5

=== Year-end charts ===
Chart (1994)	Position
Dutch Albums (Album Top 100)	100
