= Afraid of Sunlight =

Studio album by Marillion
- Released: 26 June 1995
- Recorded: January – March 1995
- Studios: The Racket Club (Buckinghamshire, England)
- Length: 51:25 (Note: EMI 7243 8 33874 2 7, CDEMD 1079)
- Label: EMI
- Producers: Dave Meegan; Marillion

Marillion chronology
Brave (1994)	Afraid of Sunlight (1995)	Made Again (1996)

Singles from Afraid of Sunlight
- 1. "Beautiful" Released: 29 May 1995

Alternative cover
- 2019 reissue cover

Afraid of Sunlight is Marillion's eighth studio album, released in 1995. It was their last for EMI (who would, however, continue to release back-catalogue material on compilations and re-issues, as well as distribute some later recordings).

Afraid of Sunlight was the first Marillion studio album to fail to reach the Top 10 in the UK Albums Chart, peaking at number 16 and falling out of the Top 75 after two weeks. Despite this, Afraid of Sunlight became one of the band's most critically acclaimed albums and was included in Q magazine's "Recordings of the Year" for 1995. It was retrospectively described by Jeri Montesano of Allmusic as "the peak of Marillion's growing, impressive body of work" and by colleague Jason Ankeny as "the most consistent Marillion release to date". The album is ranked at No. 90 on Prog Magazine's list of the 100 Greatest Prog Albums of All Time.

== Concept ==
Although not a concept album as such, Afraid of Sunlight repeatedly examines the destructive side of celebrity. In particular, "Gazpacho" lampoons the Hollywood lifestyle and seems to refer to O. J. Simpson. "Cannibal Surf Babe" is a Beach Boys pastiche inspired by late-night horror movies. "Out of This World" is dedicated to world land and water speed record holder Donald Campbell, killed in 1967. The song later inspired diver Bill Smith, to look for the actual wreckage, with the main part of the fuselage of Campbell's Bluebird K7 hydroplane being recovered from Coniston Water on 8 March 2001. Both Steve Hogarth and Steve Rothery were present at the raising. Steve Rothery produced a photographic record of the event. The title track refers to self-destructive thrill-seekers such as James Dean, while "King" is about Elvis Presley, Kurt Cobain and Michael Jackson. "Beyond You" is reminiscent of Phil Spector's Wall of Sound productions and, in homage, was mixed in mono.

One reviewer noted the 1980 Martin Scorsese film Raging Bull, about a boxer's inability to deal with fame, as a strong influence on the album. He also cited O. J. Simpson, on trial for murder at the time Afraid of Sunlight was recorded, as another influence on its concept; the wind-down of "Gazpacho" ends with a sample from a news report on Simpson's infamous flight from the police.

== Release ==
Afraid of Sunlight was released in Europe on 24 June 1995 by EMI Records on CD, LP (Note: EMI 7243 8 33874 1 0, EMD 1079) and cassette, and in the U.S. on 4 July 1995 by El Dorado, a subsidiary label of I.R.S. Records. It climbed to number 16 in the UK and spent only three weeks in the charts, the shortest chart residency of any Marillion studio album by then. The only single from the album, "Beautiful", peaked at number 29 in the UK Singles Chart. Afraid of Sunlight reached number 8 in the Netherlands, the country where the band has one of their largest fanbases.

As part of a series of Marillion's first eight studio albums, EMI Records re-released Afraid of Sunlight on 22 March 1999 with 24-bit digital remastered sound and a second disc containing bonus tracks (Note: EMI 7243 4 98614 2 8). A new 180g heavy weight vinyl pressing (Note: EMI 825646413485, VEMD 1079) identical to the original 1995 edition was released in 2013.

=== Critical reception ===
Professional ratings
Review scores
Source	Rating
AllMusic	4/5 stars
Q	4/5 stars

AllMusic critic Alex S. Garcia has retrospectively given Afraid of Sunlight a four-out-of-five star rating. He noted that the album has "some very beautiful melodic moments and perhaps a better mix between calm and aggressive melodies than on previous albums made with Steve Hogarth". Jeri Montesano called it "the peak of Marillion's growing, impressive body of work" while reviewing Seasons End (1989). His colleague Dale Jensen has named the album "the most consistent Marillion release to date". In a review from Q magazine, Afraid of Sunlight has been described as "a 40-minute journey that touches on the legacy of Brian Wilson, Todd Rundgren and The Beatles, while hinting at the experimental trivialities of Jellyfish or Split Enz".

== Track listing ==
All tracks are written by Steve Hogarth, Steve Rothery, Mark Kelly, Pete Trewavas, Ian Mosley and John Helmer, except where noted.

No.	Title	Writer(s)	Length
1.	"Gazpacho"		7:28
2.	"Cannibal Surf Babe"		5:45
3.	"Beautiful"	Hogarth, Rothery, Kelly, Trewavas, Mosley	5:12
4.	"Afraid of Sunrise"		5:02
5.	"Out of This World"		7:54
6.	"Afraid of Sunlight"		6:50
7.	"Beyond You"	Hogarth, Rothery, Kelly, Trewavas, Mosley	6:11
8.	"King"		7:03
Total length:			51:25

1999 remastered edition bonus disc
No.	Title	Writer(s)	Length
1.	"Icon"	Hogarth, Rothery, Kelly, Trewavas, Mosley	6:05
2.	"Live Forever"		4:34
3.	"Second Chance" (aka "Beautiful", mixed by Dave Meegan)		5:14
4.	"Beyond You" (demo)		5:18
5.	"Cannibal Surf Babe" (studio outtake)		6:00
6.	"Out of This World" (studio outtake)		7:28
7.	"Bass Frenzy"	Hogarth, Rothery, Kelly, Trewavas, Mosley	1:17
8.	"Mirages" (demo)	Hogarth, Rothery, Kelly, Trewavas, Mosley	6:02
9.	"Afraid of Sunlight" (acoustic demo, edited by Lucy Jordache with Peter Mew)		6:50
Total length:			48:48

- Tracks 3–9 of the 1999 remastered edition bonus disc had previously been unreleased.

=== 4-CD + Blu-ray Disc, 2019, Remixed, Digi-Book ===
CD 1 Michael Hunter 2019 Remix

CD 2 Original 1995 Dave Meegan Mix

Tracklisting for discs 1 and 2 as above

CD 3 Live At The Ahoy, Rotterdam (29 September 1995)

- Intro (Skater's Waltz) 0:47
- Incommunicado 4:56
- Hooks In You 2:59
- Gazpacho 6:16
- Icon 1:11
- Beautiful 5:33
- Hotel Hobbies 2:04
- White Russian 7:09
- Easter 6:11
- Mad 2:52
- The Opium Den 3:48
- Hard As Love 6:34
- The Hollow Man 5:14

CD 4 Live At The Ahoy, Rotterdam (29 September 1995)

- Kayleigh 4:09
- Lavender 4:19
- Afraid Of Sunlight 6:57
- Cannibal Surf Babe 4:51
- Cover My Eyes 4:15
- Slainte Mhath 4:45
- King 7:20
- Splintering Heart 7:20
- No One Can 5:36
- The Great Escape 5:46
- Uninvited Guest 4:27
- Garden Party 7:38

Blu-ray Disc

2019 Michael Hunter remix in stereo and 5.1 surround

- Gazpacho
- Cannibal Surf Babe
- Beautiful
- Afraid Of Sunrise
- Out Of This World
- Afraid Of Sunlight
- Beyond You
- King

Bonus Tracks

- Ascending Synth Groove
- Velvet Lawn
- Building Guitar
- Band Of Gold
- Gazpacho [Early Version]
- Sufer Bass
- Cannibal Surf [Early Version]
- Beautiful [Early Version]
- Kd Lang
- Out Of This World [Early Version]
- Afraid Of Sunlight [Early Version]
- Beyond You [Early Version]
- Crunchy Guitar Idea
- Deep Purple Vibe
- Watery Guitar
- King [Early Version]
- Happy Accidents
- Afraid Of Sunlight
- Beautiful
- Icon
- Live Forever
- Second Chance [early version of Beautiful]
- Beyond You [Demo]
- Cannibal Surf Babe
- Out Of This World
- Bass Frenzy
- Mirages [Demo]
- Afraid Of Sunlight [Acoustic Demo]

== Personnel ==
Marillion

- Steve Hogarth – vocals, additional keyboards and percussion
- Steve Rothery – guitar
- Mark Kelly – keyboards
- Pete Trewavas – bass and backing vocals
- Ian Mosley – drums and percussion

Additional musicians

- Barbara Lezmy – additional backing vocals (on "Cannibal Surf Babe")
- Wendy Paige – additional backing vocals (on "Cannibal Surf Babe")
- Hannah Stobart – additional backing vocals (on "Beautiful")

Technical personnel

- Dave Meegan – production, engineering and mixing (at Parr Street Studios, Liverpool, England)
- Nick Davis – mixing ("Cannibal Surf Babe") (at Rockfield Studios, Monmouthshire, Wales)
- Michael Brauer – mixing ("Beautiful") (at Sony Music Studios, New York)
- Peter Mew – 1999 digital remastering (January 1999 at Abbey Road Studios, London)
- Bill Smith Studio – design
- Paul Cox – front cover photography

== Charts ==
Chart (1995)	Peak position
Dutch Albums (Album Top 100)	8
Finnish Albums (The Official Finnish Charts)	33
German Albums (Offizielle Top 100)	52
Scottish Albums (Official Charts)	34
Swedish Albums (Sverigetopplistan)	34
UK Albums (Official Charts)	16

Chart (2019)	Peak position
Hungarian Albums (MAHASZ)	22
