= Next: The Future Just Happened =

2001 book by Michael Lewis

Next The Future Just Happened
- Hardcover edition
- Author: Michael Lewis
- Language: English
- Genre: Nonfiction
- Publisher: W. W. Norton & Company
- Publication date: July 17, 2001
- Publication place: United States
- Media type: Print (Hardback)
- Pages: 240 pp.
- ISBN: 978-0-393-02037-3

Next: The Future Just Happened is a book by Michael Lewis published on July 17, 2001 by W. W. Norton & Company. The book argues that rapidly evolving technology will upend the power structure of society. It gives power to the youngster who does not have preconceptions and entrenched interests. By making information readily available, the internet erodes the power and mystique of many professions.

== Synopsis ==
Lewis provides examples including:

- At the age of twelve, Jonathan Lebed began trading stocks. When he and three friends did well in a stock-picking contest, people began coming to him for advice. By the age of fourteen, he learned that by posting messages in chat rooms he could affect stock prices. This illustrates how internet chat rooms shifted power from seasoned professionals to a fourteen-year-old.
- In the next chapter, the legal profession suffers a blow to its pride at the hands of fifteen-year-old Marcus Arnold, who became a top-ranked respondent to legal questions on AskMe.com.
- The British rock band Marillion could not get funds for a promotional tour from their record company so they turned to the internet. By connecting directly with their fans through their website, they were able to raise money for the tour, then to produce new albums and to sell merchandise. They are no longer dependent on the normal intermediaries.
- TiVo and Replay allow people to watch TV shows when they want and to skip the advertisements. This changes the relationship between the broadcasters and the viewers.

The book continues the fracturing of the market observed by Alvin Toffler in The Third Wave (1980) and many others.
