= Marillion =

British progressive rock band

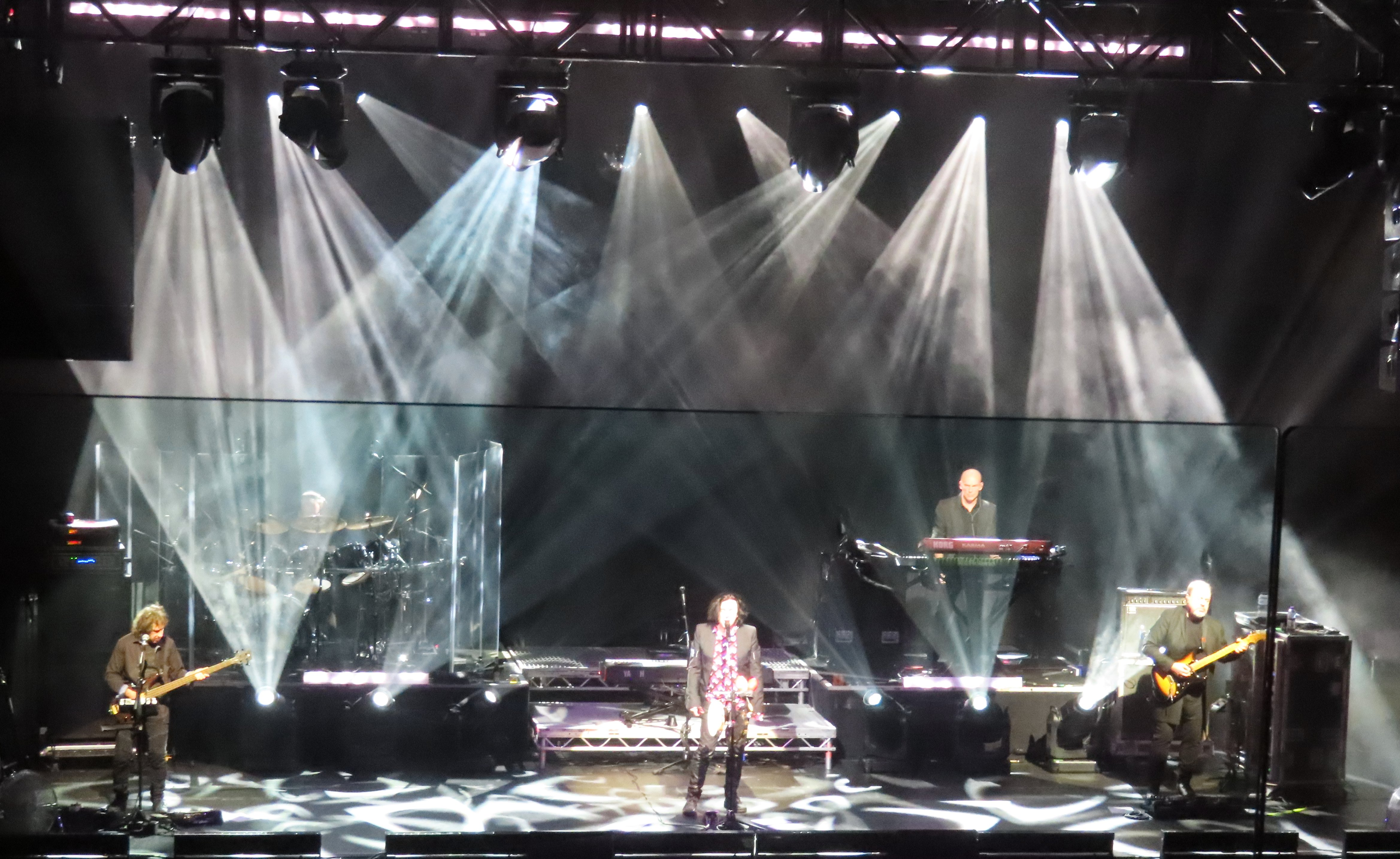
- Marillion in 2021 at Cambridge Corn Exchange. L-R: Pete Trewavas, Ian Mosley, Steve Hogarth, Mark Kelly, and Steve Rothery.

Background information
- Origin: Aylesbury, Buckinghamshire, England
- Genres: Neo-prog; progressive rock; art rock
- Works: Discography
- Years active: 1979–present
- Labels: EMI; Capitol; Castle; Racket; Intact; IRS; Caroline; Sanctuary; Velvel/Koch; Edel; Liberty; Pony Canyon
- Spinoffs: Transatlantic; Mark Kelly's Marathon; Edison's Children; The h-Band; SRB (Steve Rothery Band); Kino; Arena; The Wishing Tree
- Members: Steve Rothery; Mark Kelly; Pete Trewavas; Ian Mosley; Steve Hogarth
- Past members: Mick Pointer; Brian Jelliman; Doug Irvine; Fish; Diz Minnitt; Andy Ward; John 'Martyr' Marter; Jonathan Mover
- Website: marillion.com

Marillion /məˈrɪliən/ are a British neo-prog band, formed in Aylesbury, Buckinghamshire, in 1979. They emerged from the post-punk music scene in Britain and existed as a bridge between the styles of punk rock and classic progressive rock, becoming the most commercially successful neo-prog band of the 1980s.

Marillion released their debut single "Market Square Heroes" in 1982, followed a year later by their first album Script for a Jester's Tear. They have released 20 studio albums in total. The band achieved eight Top 10 UK albums between 1983 and 1994, including a No. 1 album in 1985 with Misplaced Childhood. The album also produced two UK Top 10 singles in "Kayleigh" (No. 2) and "Lavender" (No. 5), while the follow-up album, 1987's Clutching at Straws, included another UK Top 10 single "Incommunicado" (No. 6). Clutching at Straws was the band's last studio album with their original lead singer, Fish, who left for a solo career in late 1988. Altogether, during the Fish era, Marillion had 11 Top 40 hits on the UK singles chart. "Kayleigh" also entered the Billboard Hot 100 in the United States.

In early 1989, Marillion announced Steve Hogarth as their new lead singer. The first album with him, Seasons End, was another Top 10 hit, and albums continued to chart well until their departure from EMI Records, following the release of their 1996 live album Made Again, and the dissipation of the band's mainstream popularity in the late 1990s; save for a resurgence in the mid- to late-2000s, they have essentially been a cult act since then. Since the arrival of Hogarth, Marillion have achieved a further 12 Top 40 hit singles in the UK, including 2004's "You're Gone" from the album Marbles, which charted at No. 7 and is the biggest hit of the Hogarth era. In 2016, the album Fuck Everyone and Run (F E A R) returned them to the UK Albums Chart Top 10 for the first time since 1994's Brave. Their most recent album, 2022's An Hour Before It's Dark, entered the UK Albums Chart at No. 2, their highest chart position since Clutching at Straws in 1987. Marillion continue to tour internationally, ranked 38th in Classic Rock's "50 Best Live Acts of All Time" in 2008.

Although unpopular in the mainstream media and unfashionable within the British music industry, Marillion have maintained a loyal international fanbase. The band have been acknowledged as pioneers in the development of crowdfunding and fan-funded music, and have sold over 15 million albums worldwide.

== History ==
=== The Fish era ===
==== Formation and early years (1978–1982) ====
"I thought they were a lot like Camel. It was also very clear to me that Steve Rothery was a brilliant guitarist."

— Fish on his first impression of the band

In 1977, drummer Mick Pointer joined Electric Gypsy, which also included Doug Irvine on bass, Alan King on vocals and Andy Glass (later of Solstice) on guitar. Pointer and Irvine left to form their own band, Silmarillion, named after J.R.R. Tolkien's book The Silmarillion, in late 1978. They played one London show as an instrumental band with Neil Cockle (keys) and Martin Jenner (guitar). 1979 saw a new line-up of Mick Pointer, Steve Rothery (guitar), Doug Irvine (bass/vocals) and Brian Jelliman (keys). They played their first concert at Berkhamsted Civic Centre, Hertfordshire, on 1 March 1980. According to Pointer, it was at this stage that the name was shortened to Marillion.

Other sources have that the band name was shortened to Marillion in 1981 to avoid potential copyright conflicts, at the same time as singer Fish and bassist William 'Diz' Minnitt replaced original bassist/vocalist Doug Irvine following an audition at Leyland Farm Studios in Buckinghamshire on 2 January 1981. The line-up of Rothery, Pointer, Jelliman, Fish, and Minnitt performed their first gig at the Red Lion Pub at 35 Market Square in Bicester on 14 March 1981. Many years after his departure from Marillion, Irvine eventually joined the band Steam Shed.

By the end of 1981, Mark Kelly had replaced Jelliman on keyboards, with Pete Trewavas replacing Minnitt on bass in 1982. Minnitt later formed Pride of Passion and went on to perform with Zealey and Moore.

Marillion's first recordings were two demos recorded in March and the summer of 1980, before Fish and Minnitt joined the band. Two versions of the Spring demo circulate amongst collectors. The first has four tracks:"The Haunting of Gill House", "Herne the Hunter", an untitled track known as "Scott's Porridge", and "Alice". The second version has an instrumental version of "Alice" in place of "Scott's Porridge". All tracks are instrumental apart from "Alice", with vocals by Doug Irvine. The summer demo has three tracks; "Close" (parts of which were later rewritten into "The Web", "He Knows You Know" and "Chelsea Monday"), "Lady Fantasy" (an original based on an earlier Electric Gypsy song), and another version of "Alice". Both were recorded at The Enid's studio in Hertfordshire. Following Irvine's departure and replacement by Fish and Minnitt, the band recorded another demo tape, produced by Les Payne, in July 1981 that included early versions of "He Knows You Know", "Garden Party", and "Charting the Single".

The group attracted attention with a radio session for the Friday Rock Show. They were subsequently signed by EMI Records. They released their first single, "Market Square Heroes", in 1982, with the 17-minute epic "Grendel" on the B-side of the 12" version. Following the single, the band released their first full-length album in 1983.

==== Script for a Jester's Tear and Fugazi (1983–1984) ====
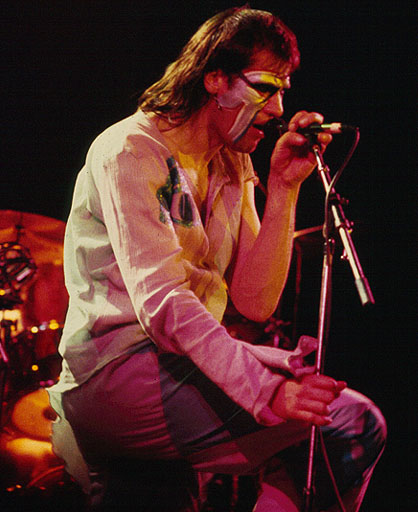
Fish performing live in 1983

The music on their debut album, Script for a Jester's Tear, was born out of the intensive performances of the previous years. Featuring a dark progressive rock sound, the album was a commercial success, peaking at No. 7 on the UK album chart and producing the singles "He Knows You Know" (No. 35) and "Garden Party" (No. 16). Although they were accused of being Genesis soundalikes, the album reached the Platinum certification and has been credited with giving a second life to progressive rock bands from the previous era.

In April 1983, following the UK tour to promote Script for a Jester's Tear, Mick Pointer was dismissed due to Fish's dissatisfaction with what he later described as the drummer's "awful" timing and failure to develop as a musician with the rest of the band. Over the next six months, three drummers passed through the band - original Camel drummer Andy Ward, followed by John 'Martyr' Marter and Jonathan Mover - before Ian Mosley, who had played for acts including Darryl Way's Wolf, Trace, Gordon Giltrap, and Steve Hackett, was secured in October 1983. Despite being beset by production problems, the band's second album Fugazi, released in early 1984, built upon the success of Script for a Jester's Tear, with a more streamlined hard rock sound. It improved on the chart placing of its predecessor by reaching the Top 5 and produced the singles "Punch and Judy" (No. 29) and "Assassing" (No. 22).

In November 1984, Marillion released their first live album, Real to Reel, featuring songs from Fugazi and Script for a Jester's Tear, as well as "Cinderella Search" (B-side to "Assassing") and the debut single "Market Square Heroes", which had not been available on album until that point. Real to Reel entered the UK album charts at No. 8.

==== Misplaced Childhood and international success (1985–1986) ====
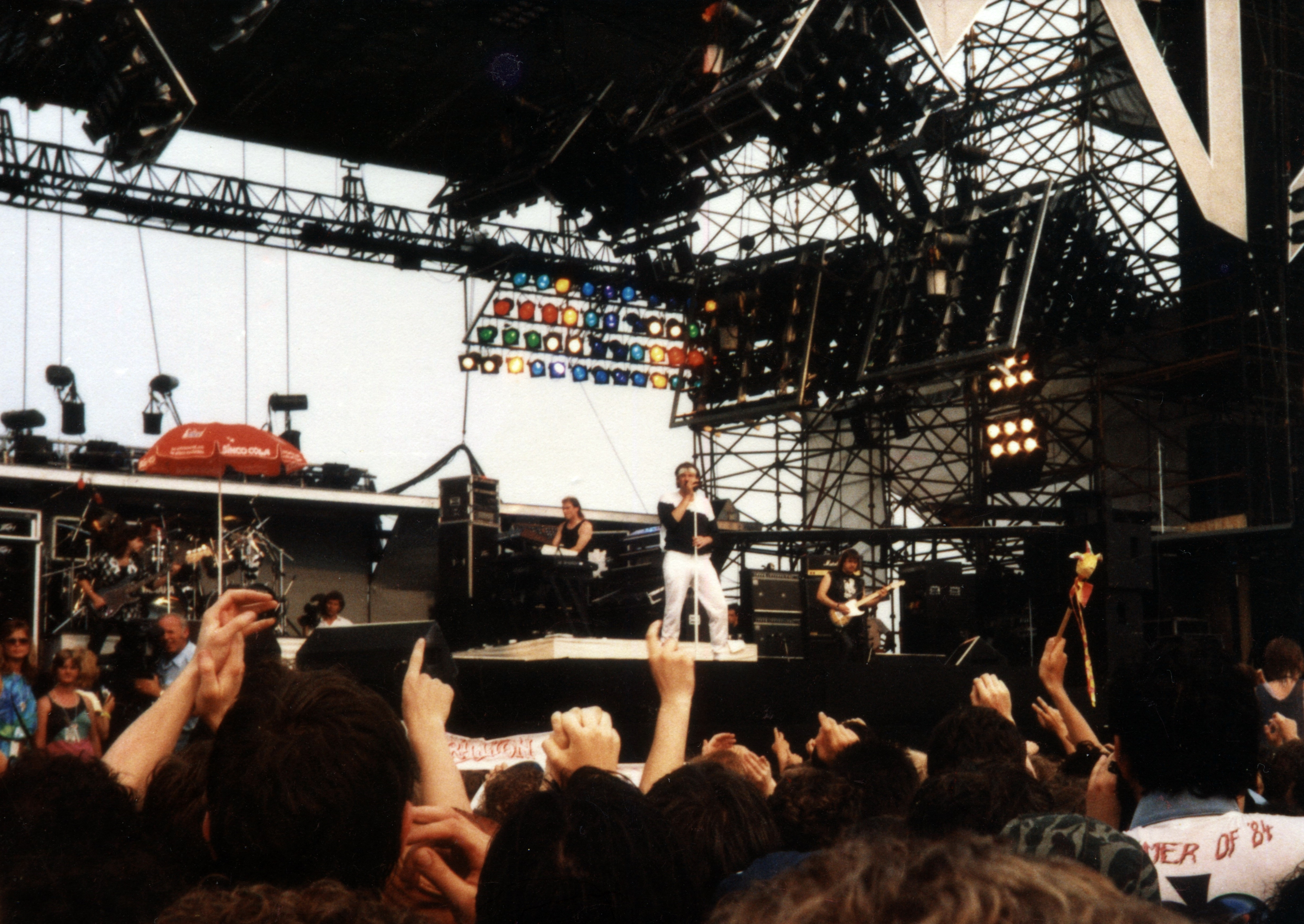
Marillion performing live in 1986

Their third and commercially most successful studio album was Misplaced Childhood, which had a more mainstream sound. The lead single from the album, "Kayleigh", received major promotion by EMI and gained heavy rotation on BBC Radio 1 and Independent Local Radio stations as well as television appearances, bringing the band to the attention of a much wider audience. "Kayleigh" reached No. 2 in the UK and "Lavender" reached No. 5; these remain the only singles by the band to enter the Top 5.

Following the exposure given to "Kayleigh" and its subsequent chart success, the album became their only No. 1 in the UK, knocking Bryan Ferry's Boys and Girls off the top spot and holding off a challenge from Sting, whose first solo album, The Dream of the Blue Turtles, entered the chart in the same week. The third single from the album, "Heart of Lothian", became another Top 30 hit for the band, reaching No. 29. The album came sixth in Kerrang! magazine's "Albums of the Year" in 1985. "Kayleigh" also gave Marillion its sole entry on the Billboard Hot 100, reaching No. 74. In the summer of 1986, the band played to their biggest ever audience as special guests to Queen at a festival in Germany attended by a crowd of over 150,000 people. They were also offered the Highlander soundtrack but turned it down because of their world tour, a missed opportunity which Rothery later said he regretted.

==== Clutching at Straws and the departure of Fish (1987–1988) ====
The fourth studio album, Clutching at Straws, shed some of its predecessor's pop stylings and retreated into a darker exploration of excess, alcoholism, and life on the road, representing the strains of constant touring that would result in the departure of Fish to pursue a solo career. It did continue the group's commercial success, however; lead single "Incommunicado" charted at No. 6 in the UK, gaining the band an appearance on Top of the Pops, and the album entered the UK album chart at No. 2. "Sugar Mice" and "Warm Wet Circles" also became hit singles, both reaching No. 22. Fish has also stated in interviews since that he believes this was the best album he made with the band. The album came sixth in Kerrang! magazine's "Albums of the Year" in 1987, equalling the ranking given to Misplaced Childhood. It was also included in Q magazine's "50 Best Recordings of the Year". Fish made the decision to leave the group after this tour, explaining his reasons for departing in a 2003 interview:

"By 1987 we were over-playing live because the manager was on 20 per cent of the gross. He was making a fantastic amount of money while we were working our asses off. Then I found a bit of paper proposing an American tour. At the end of the day the band would have needed a £14,000 loan from EMI as tour support to do it. That was when I knew that, if I stayed with the band, I'd probably end up a raging alcoholic and be found overdosed and dying in a big house in Oxford with Irish wolfhounds at the bottom of my bed."

Fish gave the band a choice to continue with either him or the manager, John Arnison. They sided with the manager and Fish left for a solo career. His last live performance with Marillion was at Craigtoun Country Park on 23 July 1988. The band's final album with Fish was a second live album, The Thieving Magpie, released in late 1988.

==== Aftermath ====
Owing to lengthy legal battles, informal contact between Fish and the other four band members apparently did not resume until 1999. Fish would disclose in the liner notes to the remastered edition of Clutching at Straws that he and his former bandmates had met up, discussed the demise of the band and renewed their friendship. They had come to the consensus that an excessive touring schedule and too much pressure from the band's management led to the rift.

Although reportedly now on good personal terms, both camps had always made it very clear that the oft-speculated-upon reunion would never happen. When Fish headlined the 'Hobble on the Cobbles' free concert in Aylesbury's Market Square on 26 August 2007, the attraction of playing their debut single in its spiritual home proved strong enough to overcome any lingering bad feeling between the former bandmates, and Kelly, Mosley, Rothery, and Trewavas replaced Fish's backing band for an emotional encore of "Market Square Heroes".

In a press interview following the event, Fish denied this would lead to a full reunion, saying that: "Hogarth does a great job with the band. We forged different paths over the 19 years."

=== The Steve Hogarth era ===
==== Seasons End and Holidays in Eden (1989–1992) ====
After the split, the band found Steve Hogarth, the former keyboardist and vocalist of the Europeans and the duo How We Live. Hogarth first sang with the band in Pete Trewavas' garage on 24 January 1989, and the first public pictures together were released in Kerrang! magazine issue 230 on 18 March 1989. Hogarth was a significant contrast to Fish, coming from a new wave musical background instead of progressive rock, and possessing a very different vocal style, image and stage presence. He had also never owned a Marillion album before joining the band.

The group had already recorded some demos of the next studio album, which was eventually titled Seasons End, just prior to the split. With Fish taking his lyrics with him, Hogarth set to work crafting new words to existing songs, collaborating with lyricist and author John Helmer. The demo sessions of the songs from Seasons End with Fish vocals and lyrics can be found on the bonus disc of the remastered version of Clutching at Straws, while those lyrics found their way into various Fish solo albums, such as his first album Vigil in a Wilderness of Mirrors, some snippets on his second album Internal Exile, and even a line or two found its way to his third album Suits.

The first time Marillion would appear in public with Steve Hogarth as the new singer was under the banner of Low Fat Yoghurts, at the Crooked Billet pub in Stoke Row, on 8 June 1989. Only about 100 fans attended that Crooked Billet show, while considerably more attended Hogarth's official introduction to fans at the recording of the promo video for "Hooks in You" at London's Brixton Academy on 1 August that year. Hogarth's first proper concert with Marillion was at the Palais des Sports in Besançon, France on 5 October following the release of Seasons End. The band ended 1989 with their traditional Christmas show at London's Hammersmith Odeon, and kicked off 1990 with the beginning of the Seasons End world tour, in front of 180,000 people at Hollywood Rock Festival in Rio de Janeiro in January, then rolling through Canada and North America before returning to Europe. The tour would prove to be the longest that Hogarth has thus far undertaken with Marillion. The tour ended in the UK in July, with a sold-out show at Wembley Arena, highlighting how successful the shift from Fish to the new frontman Hogarth had been.

Hogarth's second album with the band, Holidays in Eden, was the first he wrote in partnership with the band from the beginning, and includes the song "Dry Land", which Hogarth had written and recorded with his earlier duo, How We Live. As quoted from Steve Hogarth, "Holidays in Eden was to become Marillion's "pop"est album ever, and was greeted with delight by many, and dismay by some of the hardcore fans". EMI also wanted Marillion to deliver three hit singles from the album.

Marillion returned to their pseudonym Low Fat Yoghurts in December 1990 to preview their forthcoming album at the Moles club in Bath, Somerset. Holidays in Eden wouldn't be released until June 1991, and was followed by a headlining appearance at the second and final Cumbria Rock Festival at Derwent Park in Workington 13 July 1991. The Cumbria appearance kick-started another lengthy world tour that would see the band course through the UK, before venturing through Europe and returning to the UK for some Christmas shows. At the beginning of 1992 the band built their own recording and rehearsal studio, The Racket Club, in Buckinghamshire. March and April 1992 saw Marillion back touring Canada and America, before returning to the UK for an exclusive and intimate 10th Anniversary show at London's Borderline for members of their The Web fan club on 9 May 1992, followed by another European tour in August.

Marillion returned to the UK to headline Wembley Arena, for what would ultimately be the final time for the band, on 5 September 1992. The 1992 tour wound up in Baltimore, USA on 23 October. 1992 also saw the release of a 10th anniversary compilation album, A Singles Collection: Six of One, Half A Dozen of the Other, so-titled as it included six tracks from the Fish era and six from the two albums with Hogarth. It also included two new recordings, "I Will Walk on Water" and a cover of Rare Bird's "Sympathy". "Sympathy" was also released as a single and it reached No. 17 in the UK charts, the first time the band had been inside the singles Top 20 since "Incommunicado". Marillion would play only one live show in 1993, a fan club gig at Tivoli Theatre in Utrecht on 19 June, as a duo with only Hogarth and Trewavas. The band spent most of 1993 recording what would become one of the most significant albums of their history.

==== Brave, Afraid of Sunlight and split with EMI Records (1993–1995) ====
Their album Brave, a dark and complex concept album inspired by a true news story, was released on 7 February 1994. It took the band 18 months to write and record and marked the start of their longtime relationship with producer Dave Meegan.

Some of the material had been aired at that sole 1993 show in Utrecht, and was also previewed at low-key gigs in the Netherlands, Italy, and Germany before Marillion kicked off the Brave world tour at Liverpool's Royal Court Theatre on 20 February 1994. The Brave tour was another lengthy one, and the band undertook the move to perform the whole of their new album in its entirety (as they had done with Misplaced Childhood just under a decade earlier). However, this meant the inevitable relegating of some Fish-era songs from the set. After a series of summer shows in Japan, the Brave tour wound its way down to Mexico in September. An independent film based on the album, which featured the band, was also released in February 1995. The film was directed by Richard Stanley.

The band's next album, Afraid of Sunlight, was released June 1995. It would be Marillion's last studio album with EMI Records. It received limited promotion, no mainstream radio airplay and the sales were disappointing for the band. Despite this, it was one of their most critically acclaimed albums and was included in Q's 50 Best Albums of 1995. A particularly notable track on the album is "Out of This World", a song about Donald Campbell, who died in January 1967 whilst trying to set his eighth world water speed record on Coniston Water, in the English Lake District. The song inspired an initiative by Bill Smith, an underwater surveyor and amateur diver, to recover both Campbell's body and Bluebird K7, the hydroplane in which Campbell had crashed, from the lakebed. The recovery was finally undertaken in 2001, with both Steve Hogarth and Steve Rothery invited. Steve Rothery produced a photographic record of the event. In 1998, Hogarth said he considered Afraid of Sunlight the best album he made with the band.

On 2 August 1995, Marillion began their Afraid of Sunlight tour in USA at the Bayou in Washington D.C. They returned to the UK and Europe before ending the tour in Krakow, Poland on 21 November 1995.

==== This Strange Engine, Radiation and marillion.com (1996–1999) ====
The band's independent status was confirmed with signing a deal to the UK-based Castle. The first album to be released through Castle was the band's third live album (the first with Hogarth) Made Again. Not only did it release Marillion from its obligations with EMI (as the fifth album in a five-album deal), as well as paying off the debts without creating new ones, it marked a certain symmetry with the first seven years of the band. Mark Kelly noted: "Our first four studio albums were followed by a double live album that signalled the end of a chapter. Now, after another four studio albums, followed by a live album, we move from EMI." Featuring Brave in its entirety, Made Again was released 25 March 1996 as the final EMI-era Marillion release in the UK, with Castle handling the release in mainland Europe and the US. The release was followed by a brief tour with four dates in Europe at the end of April.

In the months prior, Rothery, Hogarth and Mosley used the break from Marillion to record separate solo projects. Mosley's project, IRIS, with French guitarist Sylvian Gouvernaire and Trewavas, released Crossing the Desert, on 22 April 1996. Rothery's project with the female singer Hannah Stobart, drummer Paul Craddick (from Enchant) and Trewavas, called The Wishing Tree, released their album Carnival of Souls in September 1996. Hogarth released his solo album Ice Cream Genius in February 1997.

This Strange Engine was the following Marillion album released in April 1997 in the UK, and in October in the US, with limited promotion from their new label Castle. Marillion could not afford to make tour stops in the United States. Their dedicated US fan base decided to solve the problem by raising some $60,000 themselves online to give to the band to come to the US. The band's loyal fanbase (combined with the Internet) would eventually become vital to their existence. Following the completion of the extensive 1997 tour (including Marillion's one-thousandth gig, on 27 October at the Amsterdam Paradiso), the band returned to their own studio, The Racket Club, in November. During 1997 to 1999, EMI issued 2-CD remastered editions of Marillion's first eight studio albums (from Script for a Jester's Tear to Afraid of Sunlight), each with a second CD of non-album tracks and other archival recordings.

The band's tenth album, Radiation, released on 21 September 1998, saw them taking a different approach and was received by fans with mixed reactions. The short Radiation tour, with only dates in the UK and mainland Europe, ended on 18 November 1998 at the Élysée Montmartre in Paris.

marillion.com was the follow-up, released on 18 October 1999, and showed progression in a new musical direction. However, the band were still unhappy with their record label situation. Under the terms of the deal, this was to be the third and final album distributed on the Castle label. The Dot Com tour, again with dates only in the UK and mainland Europe, started on 13 October at the MCM Cafe in Paris, and ended with a special Christmas show for the Web fanclubs worldwide in Aachen, Germany on 5 December 1999. For the whole of 2000, the band were writing the next album at the Racket Club and in November 2000 they played 2 Charity gigs at Bass Museum in Burton-on-Trent, before playing some more Christmas shows for their European fan clubs. Marillion needed a new strategy, and following the release of three albums via Castle, they came up with a novel approach for their next album.

==== Anoraknophobia and Marbles (2000–2006) ====
The band decided that they would try a radical experiment by asking their fans if they would help fund the recording of the next album by pre-ordering it before recording even started. The result was 12,674 pre-orders, which raised enough money to record and release Anoraknophobia in the beginning of May 2001. As a 'thank-you' gesture to the fans who pre-ordered it, their names were credited in the sleeve notes and the pre-order "Special Edition" came in a deluxe 48-page hard-bound case with an extra enhanced CD. The band was able to strike a deal with EMI to also help distribute the album. This allowed Marillion to retain all the rights to their music while enjoying commercial distribution. The band went on tour which started in May 2001. A second leg of the tour (with a setlist largely decided by a poll of the fans) reached places that had never been played before, such as in the Azores at Ponta Delgada 22 September 2001. A US Tour was still not a possibility. A four-part BBC documentary 'The Future Just Happened' aired in the UK on BBC2 in the Summer 2001. Featured in Episode 3 was Marillion's revolutionary internet pre-order campaign for Anoraknophobia. The band released its fourth live album, entitled Anorak in the UK, in 2002.

April 2002 marked a new era of Marillion fandom. The band decided to book out a holiday camp and invite their fanbase to enjoy three entire days of Marillion with three concerts, signing sessions, and more. The hallmark of the weekend was the first night which hosts the entire rendition of an album of Marillion's choice. The Marillion weekends began at Pontin's Holiday Park, Brean Sands in the West Country, to which fans would fly in from all over the world. In March 2003 they continued and held the Marillion weekend at Butlin's Minehead.

The success of Anoraknophobia allowed the band to start recording their next album, but they decided to leverage their fanbase once again to help raise money towards marketing and promotion of a new album. The band put up the album for pre-order in mid-production. This time fans responded by pre-ordering 18,000 copies.

Marbles was released at the end of April 2004 with a 2-CD version that was only available at Marillion's website. The pre-order version (known as the Deluxe Campaign Edition) of Marbles was packaged as a 128-page hard-bound book, packed in a rigid slip case. Those who purchased the Deluxe Campaign Edition by the end of 31 December 2003 were directly helping the Campaign Fund, and as a "Thank You" their name was printed in the album credits (like with the previous album, Anoraknophobia).

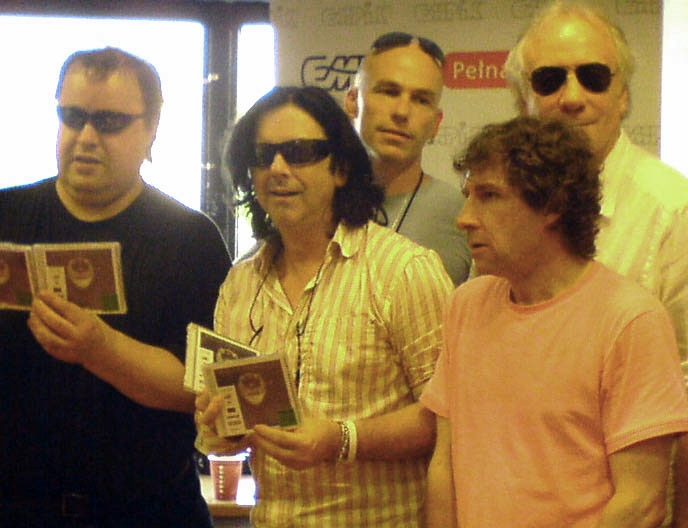
Marillion in 2007, left to right: Steve Rothery, Steve Hogarth, Pete Trewavas (front row), Mark Kelly, Ian Mosley (back row)

The band's management organised the biggest promotional schedule since they had left EMI and Steve Hogarth secured interviews with prominent broadcasters on BBC Radio, including Matthew Wright, Bob Harris, Stuart Maconie, Simon Mayo and Mark Lawson. Marbles also became the band's most critically acclaimed album since Afraid of Sunlight, prompting many positive reviews in the press. The band released "You're Gone" as the lead single from the album. Aware that it was unlikely to gain much mainstream radio airplay, the band released the single in three separate formats and encouraged fans to buy a copy of each to get the single into the UK Top Ten. The single reached No. 7, making it the first Marillion song to reach the UK Top 10 since "Incommunicado" in 1987 and the band's first Top 40 entry since "Beautiful" in 1995. The second single from the album, "Don't Hurt Yourself", reached No. 16. Following this, they released a download-only single, "The Damage (live)", recorded at the band's sell-out gig at the London Astoria. All of this succeeded in putting the band back in the public consciousness, making the campaign a success. In September 2004, Marillion returned for shows in Mexico, USA and ended in Canada Quebec City on 13 October 2004.

Marillion continued to tour throughout 2005, playing several summer festivals and embarking on acoustic tours of both Europe and the United States, followed up by the "Not Quite Christmas Tour" of Europe throughout the end of 2005.

A new DVD, Colours and Sound, was released in February 2006, documenting the creation, promotion, release, and subsequent European tour in support of the album Marbles.

==== Somewhere Else and Happiness is the Road (2007–2008) ====
In February 2007, the Marillion weekend was held abroad for the first time in the Netherlands at Center Parcs, Port Zélande.

April 2007 saw Marillion release their fourteenth studio album Somewhere Else, their first album in 10 years to make the UK Top 30. The success of the album was further underscored by that of the download-only single "See it Like a Baby", making UK No. 45 (March 2007) and the traditional CD release of "Thankyou Whoever You Are" / "Most Toys", which made UK No. 15 and No. 6 in the Netherlands during June 2007. The Somewhere Else tour started in Gibraltar 14 April 2007, and they also played in some places they had never been before like Bratislava.

In July 2008, the band posted a contest for fans to create a music video for the soon-to-be released single "Whatever is Wrong with You", and post it on YouTube. The winner would win £5,000.

Happiness Is the Road, released in October 2008, again featured a pre-order Deluxe Edition with a list of the fans who bought in advance, and a more straightforward regular release. It is another double album, with one disc based on a concept and the second containing the other songs that are not a part of the theme. Before the album's release, on 9 September 2008, Marillion pre-released their album via p2p networks themselves. Upon attempting to play the downloaded files, users were shown a video from the band explaining why they had taken this route. Downloaders were then able to opt to purchase the album at a user-defined price or select to receive DRM-free files for free, in exchange for an email address. The band explained that although they do not support piracy, they realised their music would inevitably be distributed online anyway, and wanted to attempt to engage with p2p users and make the best of the situation.

==== Less is More and Sounds That Can't Be Made (2009–2014) ====
In April 2009, they took their Marillion weekend to Montreal for the first time.

The band's sixteenth studio album (released 2 October 2009) was an acoustic album featuring new arrangements of previously released tracks (except one, the new track "It's Not Your Fault") entitled Less Is More. In October Marillion started an acoustic European tour which ended with a show in Istanbul 4 March 2010.

Their seventeenth studio album, titled Sounds That Can't Be Made, was released in September 2012. Two versions of the album were released: A two-disc Deluxe Edition that included a DVD with 'making-of' features and sound-check recordings and a single CD jewel case version. The Deluxe Edition also included a 128-page book that incorporated lyrics, artwork and, as was the case with Anoraknophobia, Marbles and Happiness is the Road, the names of people who pre-ordered the album. Parts of the album were recorded at Peter Gabriel's Real World Studios in 2011.

Marillion were awarded "Band of the Year" at the annual Progressive Music Awards in 2013.

==== Fuck Everyone and Run (F E A R), An Hour Before It's Dark and upcoming 21st studio album (2015–present) ====
In September 2015, Marillion announced that they were working on a new album, provisionally titled M18 and later confirmed as Fuck Everyone and Run (F E A R). As with several of their previous releases, the recording of the album was to be funded by fan pre-orders, this time through direct-to-fan website PledgeMusic. The album was released on 23 September 2016 debuting at No. 4 in the official UK charts of 30 September 2016, their highest placing since Clutching at Straws nearly three decades earlier. In November 2016, they announced their first ever show at the Royal Albert Hall in London, in October 2017. The gig sold out in just 4 minutes and was filmed for DVD release. They also won "UK Band of the Year" at the 2017 Progressive Music Awards.

In May 2017, Marillion took their Marillion Weekend to Santiago, Chile for the first time. In February 2018 Marillion returned to tour in the US and also played shows in Japan in September. In March 2018, the film of the Royal Albert Hall gig was premiered at cinemas around the UK, before the DVD launch, with the band attending the showing in London. On 6 April the concert was released as All One Tonight – Live at the Royal Albert Hall.

In March 2018, Hogarth was involved with fellow musician Howard Jones in helping to unveil a memorial to David Bowie, which is situated close to Aylesbury's Market Square. The memorial was the inspiration of promoter David Stopps, who booked Bowie to appear at the Friars Aylesbury where he debuted his Ziggy Stardust persona. The bulk of the funds for the memorial were raised at a gig held at the Waterside Theatre in Aylesbury on the evening of the unveiling which Marillion headlined, alongside Jones, John Otway and the Dung Beatles, all of whom have close association to Aylesbury and in particular, the Friars.

In early 2019, Marillion entered the studio with the intention to record songs from their catalogue with friends from the orchestra who played with the band at the Royal Albert Hall shows in 2017. With Friends from the Orchestra was recorded at The Racket Club and Peter Gabriel's Real World Studios and features reimagined versions of songs accompanied by the In Praise of Folly String Quartet with Sam Morris on French horn and Emma Halnan on flute. The album was released 29 November 2019. In November and December 2019, the orchestra followed Marillion on tour in the UK, returning for two nights at the Royal Albert Hall, and they also played shows in the Netherlands, France, Italy and Germany.

On 3 August 2021, Marillion announced their new pre-order campaign for their 20th studio album, entitled An Hour Before It's Dark. The album was released on 4 March 2022.

In 2021, Marillion asked their fans to insure their 10-date Light at the End of the Tunnel Tour in November. Manager Lucy Jordache said: "We're asking our fans to pledge money that will be held in escrow and if it all goes Covid free, it will be returned to them at the end of the tour. But if we do have to cancel, then their money will be used to pay the band's unavoidable expenses." The band had already invested more than £150,000 on preparations, but risked losing it all if just one member tested positive for COVID-19 and was forced to isolate. The tour was a success, and the donations were refunded to the fans who were named "Lightsavers".

In April 2026, Marillion announced that they are "very much heading into the closing stages" of work on their upcoming 21st studio album, with plans to release it later in the year.

== Line-up, influences and sound changes ==
"One of the reasons we're still together is because we're successful enough that we can still make a living, but we're not so successful that we can afford to do nothing."

— Mark Kelly in 2016

Marillion's music has changed stylistically throughout their career. The band themselves stated that each new album tends to represent a reaction to the preceding one; for this reason, their output is difficult to 'pigeonhole'. Although the band has featured two very distinct and different vocalists, the core instrumental line-up of Steve Rothery (lead guitar, and the sole 'pre-Fish' original member), Pete Trewavas (bass), Mark Kelly (keyboards) and Ian Mosley (drums) has been unchanged since 1984.

Their 1980s sound (with Fish on vocals) was guitar and keyboard-led neo-prog. They have been described at their outset as "a bridge between punk and classic progressive rock". Rothery wrote most of the music during the period Fish was in the band. Iron Maiden guitarist Janick Gers commented, "What I love so much about Marillion is that they could be very strong and powerful and have very quiet passages, but the powerful stuff was really edgy and heavy... I just thought he (Fish) wrote good lyrics, and they wrote good music, and it fit together effortlessly."

They were often compared unfavourably by critics during the Fish era with the Peter Gabriel era of Genesis, although the band had many other influences. Fish was influenced by a wide range of artists and his favourite albums were by artists such as Van der Graaf Generator, Joni Mitchell, the Who, Pink Floyd, John Martyn, Yes, Lowell George, Led Zeppelin, Roy Harper, Faces, the Beatles and Supertramp. Rothery's main influences were Andrew Latimer of Camel, Steve Hackett of Genesis and David Gilmour of Pink Floyd. He also cited Jimi Hendrix, Carlos Santana, Jeff Beck and Joni Mitchell as influences, with Gordon Giltrap an early influence on the development of his playing style. Kelly's biggest inspiration was Yes keyboardist Rick Wakeman, and Trewavas' favourite bass player was Paul McCartney. Original drummer Mick Pointer was a huge fan of Neil Peart's drumming in his favourite band, Rush.

During the Steve Hogarth era, their sound has been compared, on various albums, to more contemporary acts such as U2, Radiohead, Coldplay, Muse, Talk Talk, Elbow, and Massive Attack. In 2016, Hogarth was quoted as describing the band: "If Pink Floyd and Radiohead had a love child that was in touch with their feminine side, they would be us." According to an interview with Rothery in 2016, many of their later albums with Hogarth had been written by jamming.

== In the media ==
"We have got a bit of a reputation. I had a conversation with Noel Gallagher at a party once and said to him, 'I'm in a band but it's the most uncool band in the world - Marillion'. He went, 'Yeah, you're right.' Deadpan! Not even smiling."

— Keyboardist Mark Kelly

The chief music critic of The Guardian, Alexis Petridis, has described Marillion as "perennially unfashionable prog-rockers". On the subject of joining the band in 1989, Steve Hogarth said in a 2001 interview: "At about the same time, Matt Johnson of the The asked me to play piano on his tour. I always say I had to make a choice between the most hip band in the world, and the least." In the same conversation, he said: "We're just tired of the opinions of people who haven't heard anything we've done in ten years. A lot of what's spread about this band is laughable."

Much of the band's enduring and unfashionable reputation stems from their emergence in the early 1980s as the most commercially successful band of the neo-prog movement, an unexpected revival of the progressive rock musical style that had fallen out of critical favour in the mid-1970s. Some early critics were quick to dismiss the band as clones of Peter Gabriel-era Genesis due to musical similarities, such as their extended songs, a prominent and Mellotron-influenced keyboard sound, vivid and fantastical lyrics, and the equally vivid and fantastical artwork by Mark Wilkinson used for the sleeves of their albums and singles. Lead singer Fish was also often compared with Gabriel due to his early vocal style and theatrical stage performances, which in the early years included wearing face paint.

As Jon Wilde summarised in Melody Maker in 1989:

At the end of a strange year for pop music, Marillion appeared in November 1982 with "Market Square Heroes". There were many strange things about 1982, but Marillion were the strangest of them all. For six years, they stood out of time. Marillion were the unhippest group going. As punk was becoming a distant echo, they appeared with a sound and an attitude that gazed back longingly to the age of Seventies pomp. When compared to Yes, Genesis and ELP, they would take it as a compliment. The Eighties have seen some odd phenomena. But none quite as odd as Marillion. Along the way, as if by glorious fluke, they turned out some singles that everybody quietly liked – "Garden Party", "Punch and Judy" and "Incommunicado". By this time, Marillion did not need the support of the hip-conscious. They were massive. Perhaps the oddest thing about Marillion was that they became one of the biggest groups of the decade. They might have been an anomaly but they were monstrously effective.

The band's unfashionable reputation and image has often been mentioned in the media, even in otherwise positive reviews. In Q in 1987, David Hepworth wrote: "Marillion may represent the inelegant, unglamorous, public bar end of the current Rock Renaissance but they are no less part of it for that. Clutching at Straws suggests that they may be finally coming in from the cold." In the same magazine in 1995, Dave Henderson wrote: "It's not yet possible to be sacked for showing an affinity for Marillion, but has there ever been a band with a larger stigma attached?" He also argued that if the album Afraid of Sunlight "had been made by a new, no baggage-of-the-past combo, it would be greeted with open arms, hailed as virtual genius." In Record Collector in 2002, Tim Jones argued they were "one of the most unfairly berated bands in Britain" and "one of its best live rock acts." In 2004, Classic Rock's Jon Hotten wrote: "That genre thing has been a bugbear of Marillion's, but it no longer seems relevant. What are Radiohead if not a progressive band?" and said Marillion were "making strong, singular music with the courage of their convictions, and we should treasure them more than we do." In the Q & Mojo Classic Special Edition Pink Floyd & The Story of Prog Rock, an article on Marillion written by Mick Wall described them as "probably the most misunderstood band in the world".

In 2007, Stephen Dalton of The Times stated:

The band have just released their 14th album, Somewhere Else, which is really rather good. Containing tracks that shimmer like Coldplay, ache like Radiohead and thunder like Muse, it is better than 80 per cent of this month's releases. But you are unlikely to hear Marillion on British radio, read about them in the music press or see them play a major festival. This is largely because Marillion have – how can we put this kindly? – an image problem. Their music is still perceived as bloated, bombastic mullet-haired prog-rock, even by people who have never heard it. In fairness, they did once release an album called Script for a Jester's Tear. But, come on, we all had bad hair days in the 1980s.

Despite publishing a very good review for their 1995 album Afraid of Sunlight and including it in their 50 Best Albums of 1995, Q refused to interview the band or write a feature on them. Steve Hogarth later said: "How can they say, this is an amazing record... no, we don't want to talk to you? It's hard to take when they say, here's a very average record... we'll put you on the front cover."

In 2001, the television critic of The Guardian, Gareth McLean, used his review of the Michael Lewis BBC Two documentary, Next: The Future Just Happened, to concentrate on launching a scathing attack on the band, whose appearance only constituted one segment of the programme. He described them as "once dodgy and now completely rubbish" and he characterised their fans as "slightly simple folks". He also dismissed the band's efforts to continue their career without a label by dealing directly with their fans on the Internet, writing: "One suspects that their decision occurred round about the time that the record industry decided to shun Marillion."

Rachel Cooke, a writer for The Observer and New Statesman, has repeatedly referred negatively to the band and insulted their fans in her articles.

In an interview in 2000, Hogarth expressed regret about the band retaining their name after he joined:

If we had known when I joined Marillion what we know now, we'd have changed the name and been a new band. It was a mistake to keep the name, because what it represented in the mid-Eighties is a millstone we now carry. If we'd changed it, I think we would have been better off. We would have been judged for our music. It's such a grave injustice that the media constantly calls us a 'dinosaur prog band'. They only say that out of ignorance because they haven't listened to anything we've done for the last 15 bloody years. If you hear anything we've done in the last five or six years, that description is totally irrelevant... It's a massive frustration that no-one will play our stuff. If we send our single to Radio 1 they say: 'Sorry, we don't play music by bands who are over so-many years old... and here's the new U2 single.' I suppose it's something everyone has to cope with – every band are remembered for their big hit single, irrespective of how much they change over the years. But you can only transcend that by continuing to have hits. It's Catch 22. You know, at some stage, someone has to notice that we're doing interesting things. Someday someone will take a retrospective look at us and be surprised.

The 2013 film Alan Partridge: Alpha Papa includes a joke reference to a former drummer of the band. The band were quoted: "We know Marillion are seen as 'uncool' but we were delighted to be a part of it."

== Crowdfunding pioneers ==
Marillion are widely considered to have been one of the first mainstream acts to have fully recognised and tapped the potential for commercial musicians to interact with their fans via the internet, starting in around 1996, and are nowadays often characterised as a rock & roll 'Web Cottage Industry'. The history of the band's use of the Internet is described by Michael Lewis in the book Next: The Future Just Happened as an example of how the Internet is shifting power away from established elites, such as multinational record labels and record producers.

The band are renowned for having an extremely dedicated following (often self-termed 'Freaks'), with some fans regularly travelling significant distances to attend single gigs, driven in large part by the close fan base involvement which the band cultivate via their website, podcasts, biennial conventions and regular fanclub publications. The release of their 2001 album Anoraknophobia, which was funded by their fans through advance orders instead of by the band signing to a record company, gained significant attention and was called "a unique funding campaign" by the BBC. Writing for The Guardian, Alexis Petridis described Marillion as "the undisputed pioneers" of fan-funded music.

== Members ==
=== Current ===
Image	Name	Years active	Instruments	Studio albums release contributions
	Steve Rothery	1979–present	electric and acoustic guitars; additional bass guitars; occasional backing vocals	all releases
	Mark Kelly	1981–present	keyboards; samples and effects; backing vocals; programming	all releases
	Pete Trewavas	1982–present	bass guitars; backing vocals; additional guitars; additional studio samples and effects	all releases
	Ian Mosley	1983–present	drums; percussion; occasional backing vocals	all releases except Script for a Jester's Tear (1983)
	Steve Hogarth	1989–present	lead vocals; additional keyboards; additional live guitars; percussion	all releases from Seasons End (1989) onward

=== Former ===
Image	Name	Years active	Instruments	Studio albums release contributions
	Mick Pointer	1979–1983	drums; percussion	Script for a Jester's Tear (1983)
	Brian Jelliman	1979–1981	keyboards	none
	Doug 'Rastus' Irvine	1979–1980	bass guitars; lead vocals	none
	Fish	1981–1988	lead vocals; percussion	all releases from Script for a Jester's Tear (1983) to Clutching at Straws (1987)
	William 'Diz' Minnitt	1981–1982	bass guitars	none
	Andy Ward	1983	drums; percussion	none
	John 'Martyr' Marter	1983	drums; percussion	none
	Jonathan Mover	1983	drums	none
	Dave Lloyd	1988	lead vocals	none

=== Touring ===
- Cori Josias – backing vocals (1987)
- Leon Parr – drums (2014)
- Riccardo Romano – keyboards (2018)
- Luís Jardim – percussion (2022-2023; died 2025)
- Nick Beggs – bass guitar, backing vocals (2024)

=== Line-ups ===
Period	Members	Studio albums Releases
August 1979 – November 1980	Steve Rothery – electric and acoustic guitars; Doug 'Rastus' Irvine – bass guitars, lead vocals; Brian Jelliman – keyboards; Mick Pointer – drums	none
November 1980 – January 1981	Steve Rothery – electric and acoustic guitars; Brian Jelliman – keyboards; Mick Pointer – drums	none
January – November 1981	Fish – lead vocals, percussion; Steve Rothery – electric and acoustic guitars; William 'Diz' Minnitt – bass guitars; Brian Jelliman – keyboards; Mick Pointer – drums	none
November 1981 – March 1982	Fish – lead vocals, percussion; Steve Rothery – electric and acoustic guitars; William 'Diz' Minnitt – bass guitars; Mark Kelly – keyboards, samples and effects, backing vocals, programming; Mick Pointer – drums	none
March 1982 – April 1983	Fish – lead vocals, percussion; Steve Rothery – electric and acoustic guitars; Pete Trewavas – bass guitars, backing vocals, additional studio samples and effects; Mark Kelly – keyboards, samples and effects, backing vocals, programming; Mick Pointer – drums	Script for a Jester's Tear (1983)
April – May 1983	Fish – lead vocals, percussion; Steve Rothery – electric and acoustic guitars; Pete Trewavas – bass guitars, backing vocals; Mark Kelly – keyboards, samples and effects, backing vocals, programming	none
May – August 1983	Fish – lead vocals, percussion; Steve Rothery – electric and acoustic guitars; Pete Trewavas – bass guitars, backing vocals; Mark Kelly – keyboards, samples and effects, backing vocals, programming; Andy Ward – drums	none
August 1983	Fish – lead vocals, percussion; Steve Rothery – electric and acoustic guitars; Pete Trewavas – bass guitars, backing vocals; Mark Kelly – keyboards, samples and effects, backing vocals, programming; John 'Martyr' Marter – drums; Andy Ward – percussion	none
September 1983	Fish – lead vocals, percussion; Steve Rothery – electric and acoustic guitars; Pete Trewavas – bass guitars, backing vocals; Mark Kelly – keyboards, samples and effects, backing vocals, programming; John 'Martyr' Marter – drums	none
September – October 1983	Fish – lead vocals, percussion; Steve Rothery – electric and acoustic guitars; Pete Trewavas – bass guitars, backing vocals; Mark Kelly – keyboards, samples and effects, backing vocals, programming; Jonathan Mover – drums	none
October 1983 – September 1988	Fish – lead vocals, percussion; Steve Rothery – electric and acoustic guitars; Pete Trewavas – bass guitars, backing vocals; Mark Kelly – keyboards, samples and effects, backing vocals, programming; Ian Mosley – drums, percussion	Fugazi (1984); Misplaced Childhood (1985); Clutching at Straws (1987)
September 1988 – December 1988	Steve Rothery – electric and acoustic guitars; Pete Trewavas – bass guitars, backing vocals; Mark Kelly – keyboards, samples and effects, backing vocals, programming; Ian Mosley – drums, percussion	none
December 1988	Dave Lloyd – lead vocals; Steve Rothery – electric and acoustic guitars; Pete Trewavas – bass guitars, backing vocals, additional studio guitars, additional studio samples and effects; Mark Kelly – keyboards, samples and effects, backing vocals, programming; Ian Mosley – drums, percussion	none
December 1988 – January 1989	Steve Rothery – electric and acoustic guitars; Pete Trewavas – bass guitars, backing vocals; Mark Kelly – keyboards, samples and effects, backing vocals, programming; Ian Mosley – drums, percussion	none
January 1989 – present	Steve Hogarth – lead vocals, additional keyboards, additional live guitars, percussion; Steve Rothery – electric and acoustic guitars; Pete Trewavas – bass guitars, backing vocals, additional studio guitars, additional studio samples and effects; Mark Kelly – keyboards, samples and effects, backing vocals, programming; Ian Mosley – drums, percussion	Seasons End (1989); Holidays in Eden (1991); Brave (1994); Afraid of Sunlight (1995); This Strange Engine (1997); Radiation (1998); marillion.com (1999); Anoraknophobia (2001); Marbles (2004); Somewhere Else (2007); Happiness Is the Road (2008); Less Is More (2009); Sounds That Can't Be Made (2012); Fuck Everyone and Run (F E A R) (2016); With Friends from the Orchestra (2019); An Hour Before It's Dark (2022)

== Discography ==
Studio albums

- Script for a Jester's Tear (1983)
- Fugazi (1984)
- Misplaced Childhood (1985)
- Clutching at Straws (1987)
- Seasons End (1989)
- Holidays in Eden (1991)
- Brave (1994)
- Afraid of Sunlight (1995)
- This Strange Engine (1997)
- Radiation (1998)
- marillion.com (1999)
- Anoraknophobia (2001)
- Marbles (2004)
- Somewhere Else (2007)
- Happiness Is the Road (2008)
- Less Is More (2009)
- Sounds That Can't Be Made (2012)
- Fuck Everyone and Run (F E A R) (2016)
- With Friends from the Orchestra (2019)
- An Hour Before It's Dark (2022)
