= Ian Mosley =

English drummer

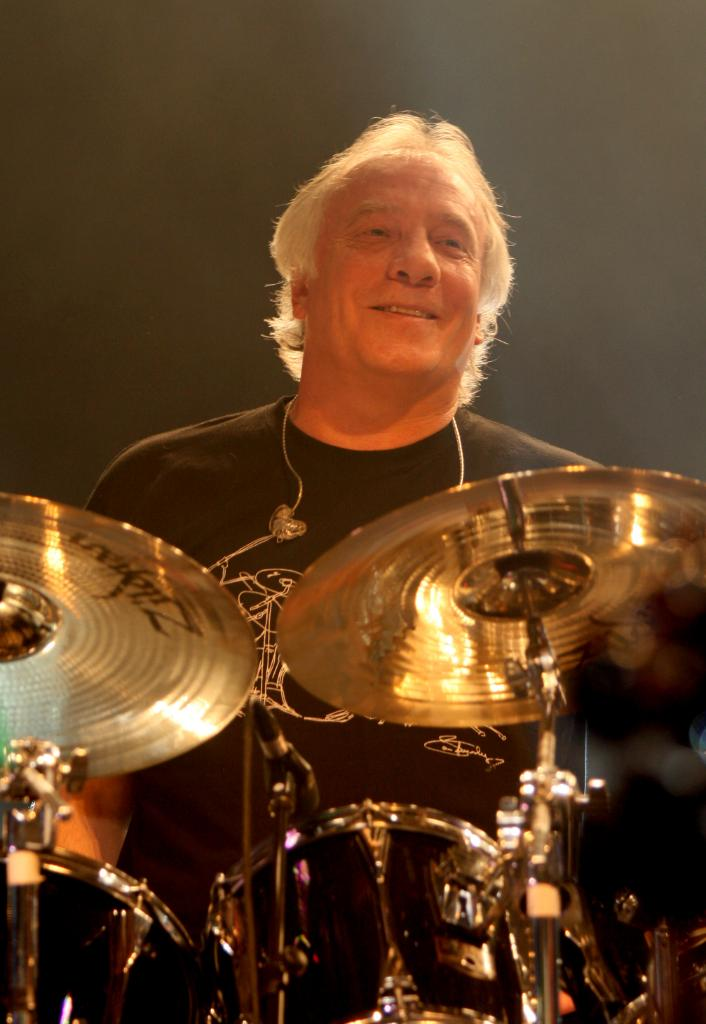
- Mosley onstage with Marillion at their 2009 weekend festival in Montreal, Canada

Background information
- Born: 16 June 1953 (age 73); Paddington, London, England
- Genres: Neo-prog
- Occupation: Drummer
- Years active: 1975–present
- Website: Ian Mosley's page at the Marillion website

Ian F. Mosley (born 16 June 1953) is an English drummer. He is best known for his long-time membership of the neo-prog band Marillion, which he joined for their second album, Fugazi, released in 1984. He had previously been a session drummer. Mosley's abilities have been praised, including by former Genesis guitarist Steve Hackett, Meshuggah drummer Tomas Haake and critic John Franck of AllMusic. Modern Drummer has characterised him as a "drumming great".

== Early life ==
Mosley studied percussion at the Guildhall School of Music and Drama under teacher Gilbert Webster and, aged 18, played in the orchestra for the musical Hair. His first professional band was Darryl Way's Wolf, and played drums on the 1973 albums Canis Lupus and Saturation Point, and the third album, Night Music, from 1974. He later played on the track Finale on the 1978 album Concerto for Electric Violin. More session work followed in the Netherlands. In 1975, Mosley played on the album Birds by Dutch band Trace, before joining Gordon Giltrap Band and played on the 1979 album The Peacock Party and the following tour. In 1981, Mosley joined former Genesis guitarist Steve Hackett and played on the Cured tour, recordings later released on the live album Time Lapse. Mosley played on the 1983 album Highly Strung and the following tour. Mosley also played on Hackett's album Till We Have Faces, before joining Marillion.

== Career ==
=== Marillion ===
Mosleys first concert with Marillion was 27 October 1983 in Aberystwyth. The band was writing their second album at Rockfield Studios in Wales, and Mosley joined Marillion as a session drummer, after a long search for a replacement for drummer and founding member Mick Pointer, who had left the band acrimoniously in April 1983. Mosley was the fifth drummer to play for Marillion and was frontman Fish's choice for the role, who had been unhappy with the band's previous drummers.

Music critic John Franck stated Mosley's "spot-on drumming was the perfect foil for Marillion's meticulous musicianship". He is still a member of Marillion.

=== Other projects ===
In 1985, Mosley recorded drums on the track Dream Within A Dream on Propagandas A Secret Wish.

In 1994, Mosley played on John Wesleys debut album, Under the Red and White Sky on the tracks None So Beautiful and Thirteen Days. Marillion members Mark Kelly played keyboards and produced the album, and Steve Rothery played a guitar solo on Thirteen Days.

In 1996, Mosley and Pete Trewavas recorded an instrumental album at Marillion's own studio the Racket Club with French guitarist and keyboardist Sylvian Gouvernaire (from the French prog rock band Arrakeen). The project was called Iris, and the album Crossing the Desert was released in April 1996 on the Racket Records label. Science fiction artist Danny Flynn provided the artwork.

In 2001, Mosley joined saxophonist Ben Castle, son of entertainer Roy Castle, and they recorded a jazz-themed album together, Postmankind. The album also featured guest performances by John Etheridge, Steve Hackett and Marillion members Steve Rothery and Pete Trewavas.

Mosley played on fellow Marillion bandmate Pete Trewavas' and Eric Blackwood's Edison's Children album In The Last Waking Moments..., playing drums on the epic 16 minute The Awakening.

== Musical style ==
Mosley's drumming skills have been praised by Steve Hackett, who has described him as "a phenomenal drummer" and "phenomenally fast". He has also said that Mosley's economy on the drums is "every bit the equal" to Phil Collins, Hackett's former Genesis bandmate.

Mosley has been cited as an influence by Tomas Haake, drummer of Swedish extreme metal band Meshuggah.

Mosley has stated that he enjoys "playing arrangements kind of in a classical format, which is in movements" but, despite his membership of several progressive rock bands over the course of his career, he does not believe in music labels and distances himself from the "progressive label" that "involves lyrics that quote dancing gnomes, Stonehenge and fairytales, etc."

Mosley's drumming is the subject of a book, A guide to the unique drumming style of Ian Mosley – Marillion's Heartbeat, written by drummer and Marillion fan, Mark Pardy.

In 2019, Mosley published his collected memoirs under the title Do I Owe You Money? – The Collected Memoirs of Ian Mosley.
