= Mark Kelly (keyboardist) =

Irish keyboardist (born 1961)

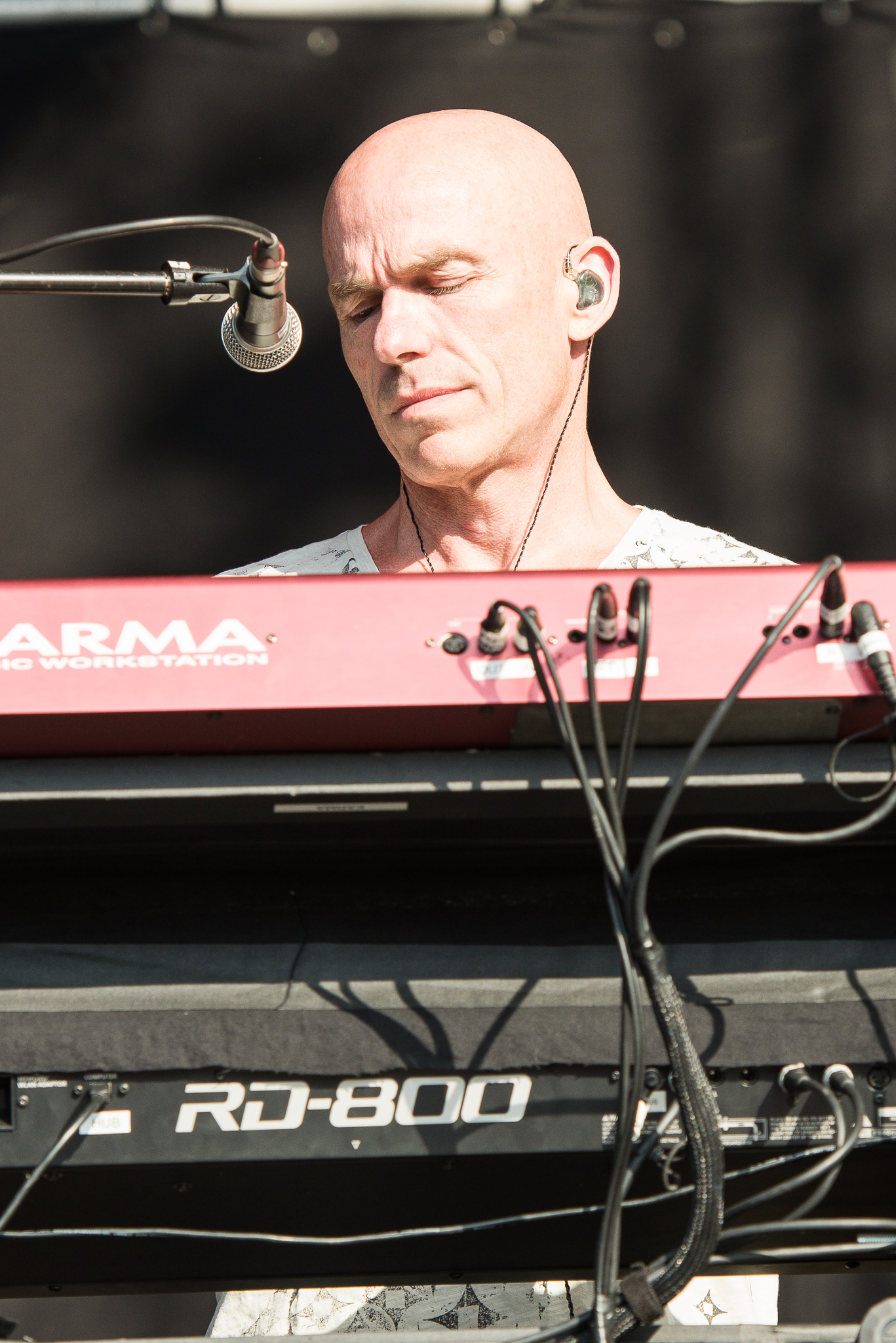
- Kelly with Marillion at the Lieder am See Festival in Spalt, Germany, in 2016

Background information
- Born: Mark Colbert Kelly; 9 April 1961 (age 65); Dublin, Ireland
- Genres: Art rock; neo-prog; pop rock
- Occupation: Musician
- Instrument: Keyboard
- Years active: 1980–present
- Member of: Marillion; Mark Kelly's Marathon
- Formerly of: Chemical Alice; DeeExpus

Mark Colbert Kelly (born 1961) is an Irish keyboardist and a member of the neo-prog band Marillion.

== Biography ==
Kelly was born on 9 April 1961 and was raised in Ireland until he moved to England with his parents in 1969.

Kelly was an electronics student while performing part-time in the progressive/psychedelic band Chemical Alice, who released their EP Curiouser and Curiouser in 1981. He was invited to join Marillion when they supported Chemical Alice, replacing founding keyboardist Brian Jelliman. His first performance with the band was at the Great Northern at Cambridge on 1 December 1981. He has appeared on every Marillion studio album. Kelly also appeared on John Wesley's album Under the Red and White Sky in 1994 and on Jump's album Myth of Independence in 1995 on production and keyboards.

Kelly has played keyboards with Travis for their headlining set at the Isle of Wight Festival (10–12 June 2005), and at T in the park in 2005. He played Keyboards for Edison's Children's album "In The Last Waking Moments..." (featuring fellow Marillion member Pete Trewavas and Eric Blackwood), for the song The "Other" Other Dimension as well as performing vocals with Steve Hogarth and Andy Ditchfield (DeeExpus) on the Edison's Children track The Awakening in 2011.

Kelly is credited with inventing online crowdfunding to fund the recording of Marillion's 2001 album Anoraknophobia, following a fan-funded Marillion tour of the United States in 1997, and pioneered many of the ideas copied by other music artists since. Kelly was made Co-CEO of the Featured Artists Coalition, an organization which represents the interests of music artists in the digital age. Kelly stood down as a director of the FAC in 2018. From 2009 until 2020 Kelly was an elected performer-director of PPL.

In 2016, he was cast as a guest keyboardist in Ayreon's 2017 album The Source.

In September 2020, Kelly released a single "Amelia" with his new solo band, Mark Kelly's Marathon. The debut album was released in November 2020.
