= Pete Trewavas =

British bassist

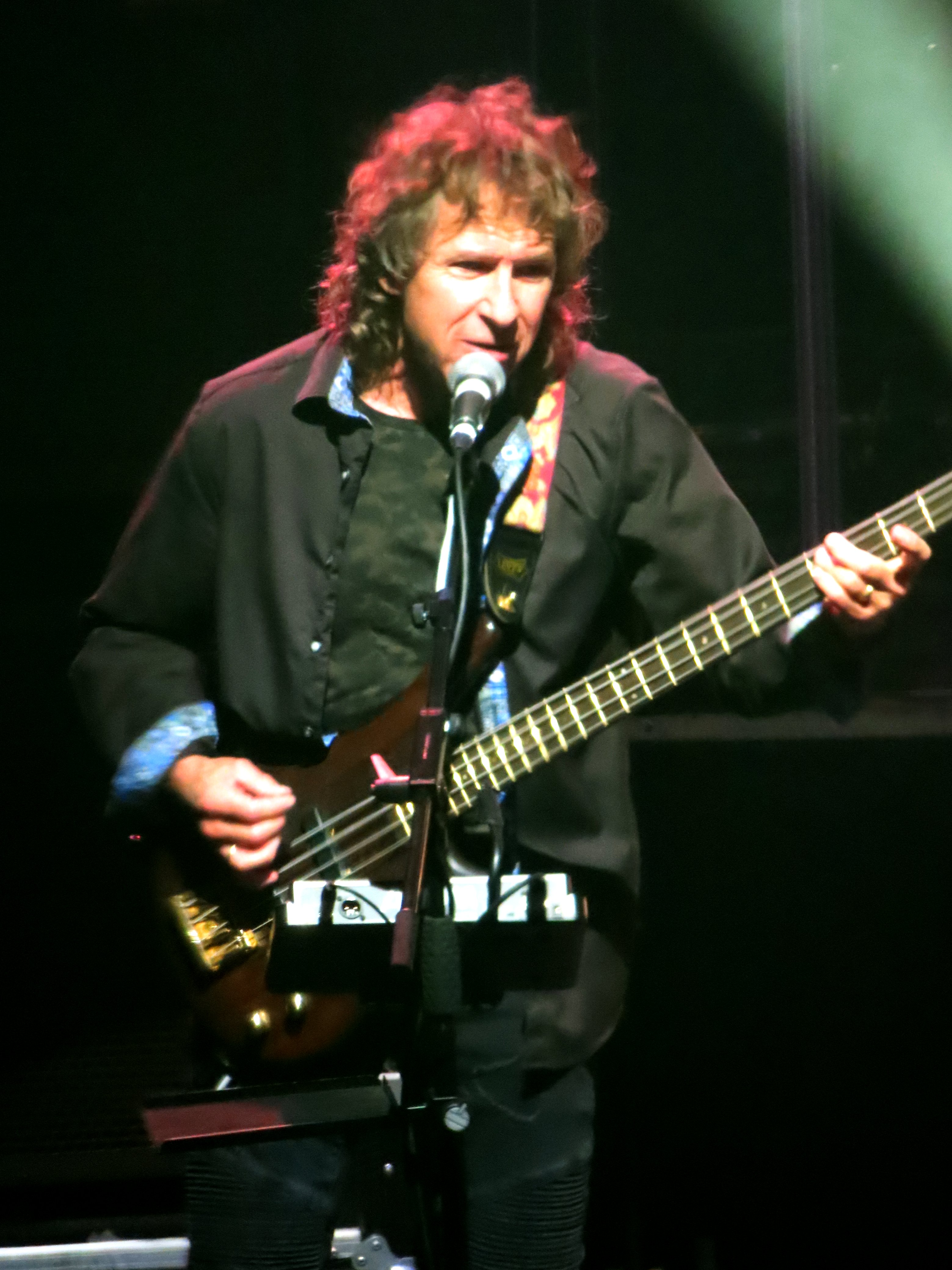
- Trewavas performing with Marillion in 2021

Background information
- Born: 15 January 1959 (age 67); Middlesbrough, England
- Genres: Art rock, progressive rock
- Occupation: Musician
- Instruments: Bass; vocals; guitar
- Years active: 1982–present
- Member of: Marillion; Transatlantic; Kino; Edison's Children
- Formerly of: The Metros; Iris

Peter Trewavas (born 15 January 1959) is an English musician, best known as the bassist of the progressive rock band Marillion. He joined in 1982, replacing Diz Minnitt, while acting as a backing vocalist and occasional guitarist.

== Biography ==
Trewavas was born in Middlesbrough, but spent much of his childhood in the Buckinghamshire town of Aylesbury. It was in Aylesbury that he became involved in several bands, having the most success with The Metros, before taking up his long-term role in Marillion.

Trewavas is also a member of the progressive rock supergroup Transatlantic. In 2004, he co-founded another group called Kino, with John Mitchell (Arena), John Beck (It Bites) and Chris Maitland (ex-Porcupine Tree).

In 2011, Pete Trewavas joined up with his longtime friend Eric Blackwood to form the duo Edison's Children. The new project was designed to be a creative outlet for Pete Trewavas (who has traditionally recorded in a "band" or "group" format on bass and acoustic guitar), in which he could also play lead guitar, lead vocals, drum programming and keyboards as well as have full creative control over the writing and producing of the record with. The 72-minute concept album In The Last Waking Moments... about a man fighting to understand if a recent bizarre happening was reality or a descent into madness, was released on 11.11.11.

The Edison's Children project would result in the release of the single "A Million Miles Away (I Wish I Had A Time Machine)". The song debuted on American Commercial Radio in June 2012 and by September it had reached the FMQB U.S. Commercial Radio Top 40 where it remained for 10 weeks (and stayed in the top 100 for 25 weeks) peaking at No. 32.

On 11 January 1999, Trewavas was hit by a motorist when cycling home from the studio Racket Club. He suffered multiple injuries and spent time in intensive care, and underwent surgery on his leg.

Trewavas is a fan of the football team Manchester United F.C.

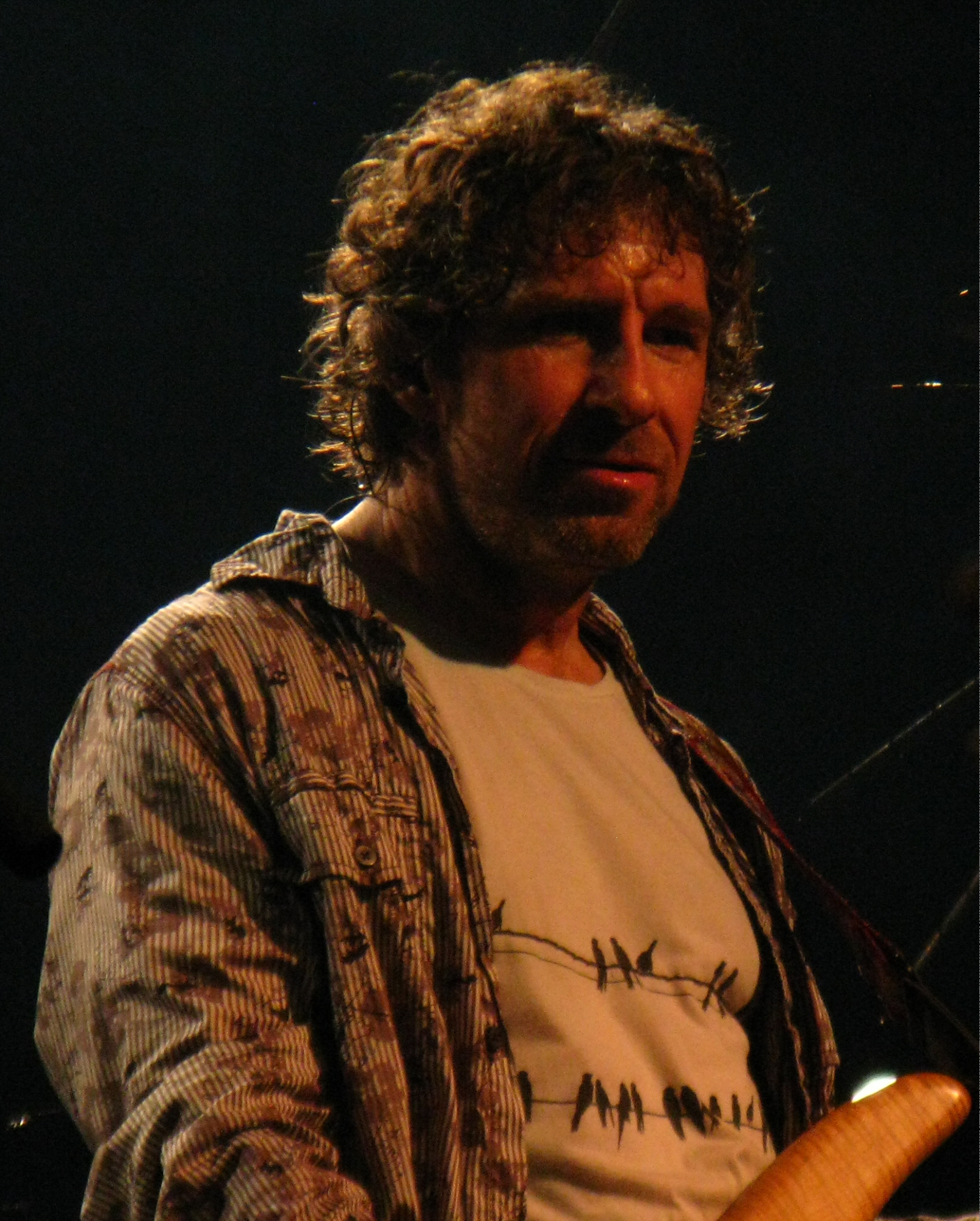
Trewavas on tour with Transatlantic (2010)

== Equipment ==
Trewavas uses:

- Warwick WA600 bass amplifier head
- Warwick 4x10 cabinet paired with a Warwick 1x15 cabinet
- Laney Amplification and Ibanez Bass Guitars
- Laney B2 power amp & cabinets
- Laney RWB300 Combo
- Ibanez RDB Bass
- Fender Precision Bass
- Fender Jazz Bass
- Squier Precision Bass
- Squier Jazz Bass
- Rickenbacker 4080 double-neck bass/guitar
- Warwick Basses
- Ibanez SR1000 EFM Prestige
- Elites stadium series 45–105 strings
- TC Electronic D-Two multi-tap rhythm delay processor
- Pete Trewavas performing with Marillion in Aylesbury on September 21st, 2026 with Warwick amplification
  Various Boss effects pedals: Delay, EQ, Chorus, Distortion, Octaver
- Sennheiser wireless system
- Roland PK5 Bass Pedals Controller
