= Marillion discography =

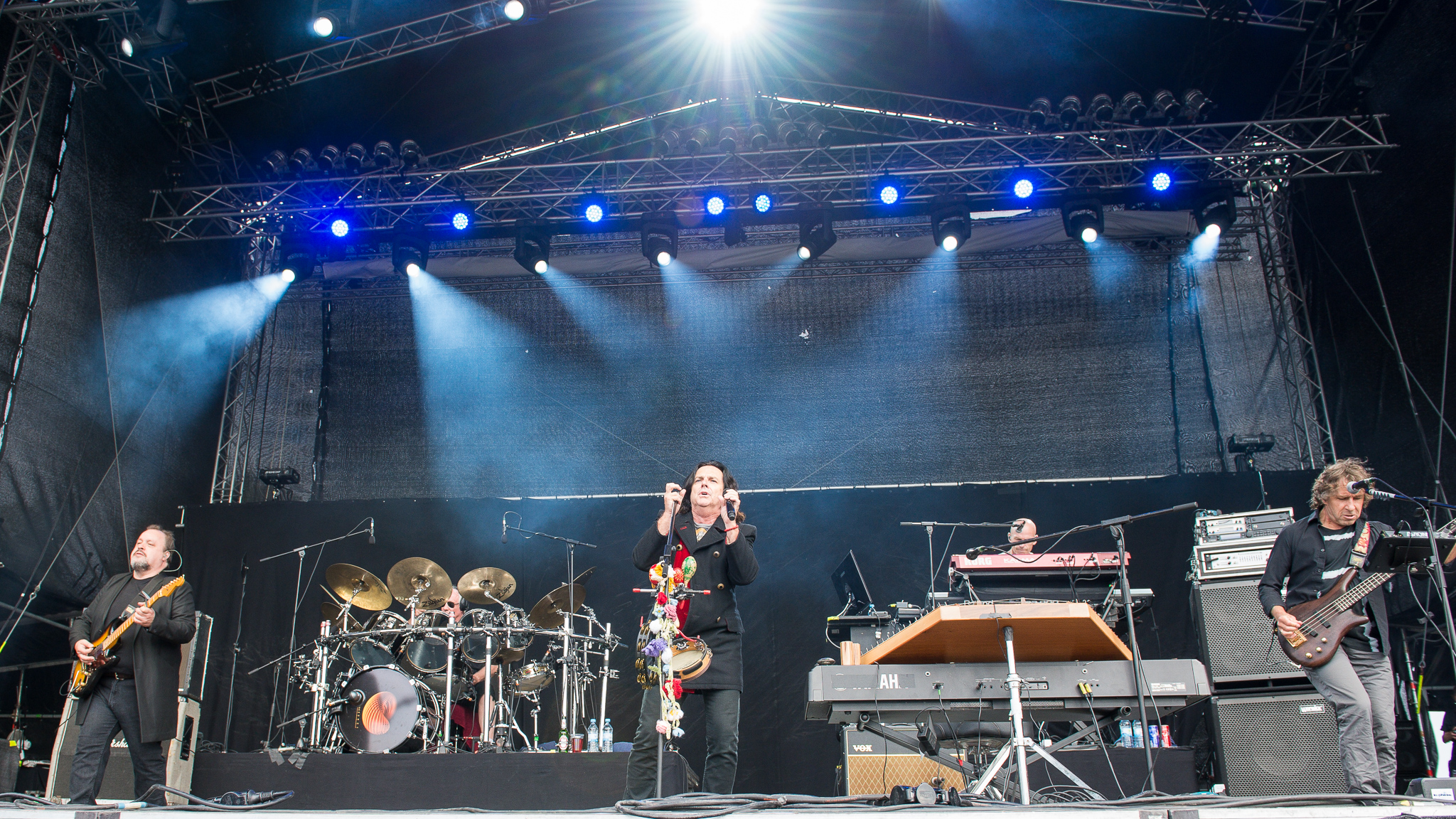
- Studio albums: 20
- Live albums: 22
- Compilation albums: 6
- Singles: 40
- Box sets: 4

This is the discography of the British rock band Marillion. Mostly associated with the progressive rock genre, they emerged as the most successful band of its second wave, neo-prog, but they have also achieved over 20 UK Top 40 singles, including four which reached the Top 10. They have released nine albums which reached the Top 10 of the UK Albums Chart. Their discography includes two albums which have been Platinum-certified by the British Phonographic Industry and five which have achieved Gold status, all of which were released during their commercial peak in the 1980s.

== Albums ==
=== Studio albums ===
| Title | Album details | Peak chart positions | | | | | | | | | | Certifications |
| Title | Album details | UK | CAN | FIN | FRA | GER | NL | NOR | SWE | SWI | US | Certifications |
|---|---|---|---|---|---|---|---|---|---|---|---|---|
| Script for a Jester's Tear | Released: 14 March 1983; Label: EMI, Capitol; Formats: LP, MC | 7 | 51 | — | — | 5 | 56 | — | 42 | — | 175 | UK: Platinum |
| Fugazi | Released: 12 March 1984; Label: EMI, Capitol; Formats: CD, LP, MC | 5 | 71 | — | — | 4 | 14 | — | 23 | 13 | 209 | UK: Gold |
| Misplaced Childhood | Released: 17 June 1985; Label: EMI, Capitol; Formats: CD, LP, MC | 1 | 88 | 29 | — | 3 | 6 | 10 | 15 | 6 | 47 | UK: Platinum; GER: Platinum; SWI: Gold |
| Clutching at Straws | Released: 22 June 1987; Label: EMI, Capitol; Formats: CD, LP, MC | 2 | 81 | 15 | 20 | 3 | 3 | 4 | 9 | 3 | 103 | UK: Gold; GER: Gold |
| Seasons End | Released: 25 September 1989; Label: EMI, Capitol; Formats: CD, LP, MC | 7 | — | — | — | 11 | 20 | 20 | 28 | 11 | — | UK: Gold |
| Holidays in Eden | Released: 24 June 1991; Label: EMI, I.R.S.; Formats: CD, LP, MC | 7 | — | — | — | 10 | 7 | — | 36 | 17 | — | |
| Brave | Released: 7 February 1994; Label: EMI, I.R.S.; Formats: CD, 2×LP, MC | 10 | — | 26 | 27 | 17 | 7 | — | 25 | 21 | — | |
| Afraid of Sunlight | Released: 26 June 1995; Label: EMI, El Dorado; Formats: CD, LP, MC | 16 | — | 33 | — | 52 | 8 | — | 34 | — | — | |
| This Strange Engine | Released: 9 April 1997; Label: Raw Power, Velvel; Formats: CD, MC | 27 | — | 39 | — | 14 | 10 | — | — | 54 | — | |
| Radiation | Released: 18 September 1998; Label: Raw Power, Velvel; Formats: CD, MC | 35 | — | — | 56 | 46 | 26 | — | — | — | — | |
| marillion.com | Released: 18 October 1999; Label: Intact, Sanctuary; Formats: CD, MC | 53 | — | — | 66 | 10 | 40 | — | — | 47 | — | |
| Anoraknophobia | Released: 7 May 2001; Label: Liberty EMI, Formats: CD, MC | — | — | — | 62 | 42 | 67 | — | — | — | — | |
| Marbles | Released: 3 May 2004; Label: Intact; Formats: 2×CD | — | — | — | 68 | 56 | 42 | — | — | — | — | |
| Somewhere Else | Released: 9 April 2007; Label: Intact; Formats: CD | 24 | — | — | 59 | 36 | 18 | — | — | 83 | — | |
| Happiness Is the Road Vol. 1 Happiness Is the Road Vol. 2 | Released: 10 September 2008; Label: Intact; Formats: 2×CD, digital download | — | — | — | — | — | 83; 85 | — | — | — | — | |
| Less Is More | Released: 2 October 2009; Label: Intact; Formats: CD, digital download | 136 | — | — | 156 | — | 72 | — | — | — | — | |
| Sounds That Can't Be Made | Released: 17 September 2012; Label: earMUSIC; Formats: CD, digital download | 43 | — | — | 41 | 29 | 22 | 37 | 55 | 58 | — | |
| Fuck Everyone and Run (F E A R) | Released: 23 September 2016; Label: Intact, earMUSIC; Formats: CD, 2×LP, digital download | 4 | — | — | 14 | 10 | 6 | — | 17 | 15 | — | |
| With Friends from the Orchestra | Released: 29 November 2019; Label: Intact, earMUSIC; Formats: CD, 2×LP, digital download | — | — | — | 179 | 69 | 79 | — | — | 85 | — | |
| An Hour Before It's Dark | Released: 4 March 2022; Label: Intact, earMUSIC; Formats: CD, 2×LP, MC, digital download | 2 | — | 38 | 13 | 2 | 2 | 32 | 29 | 6 | — | |
"—" denotes releases that did not chart or were not released in that territory.

=== Live albums ===
The table below only lists live albums which were released to retail on a major label. In addition, there have been many live releases on the band's own Racket Records label, which are detailed separately in the relevant section below.

| Title | Album details | Peak chart positions | | | | | | Certifications |
| Title | Album details | UK | FRA | GER | NL | SWE | SWI | Certifications |
|---|---|---|---|---|---|---|---|---|
| Real to Reel | Released: 5 November 1984; Label: EMI; Formats: LP, MC | 8 | — | 38 | — | 49 | — | UK: Gold |
| The Thieving Magpie (La Gazza Ladra) | Released: 28 November 1988; Label: EMI, Capitol; Formats: 2×CD, 2×LP, 2×MC | 25 | — | 19 | 46 | 33 | 18 | UK: Gold |
| Made Again | Released: 25 March 1996; Label: Intact; Formats: 2×CD, 2×MC | 37 | — | — | 35 | — | — | |
| Unplugged at the Walls | Released: 23 March 1999; Label: Racket Records; Formats: 2×CD; Limited edition retail release of Racket 10 | — | — | — | — | — | — | |
| Anorak in the UK | Released: 8 April 2002; Label: Intact; Formats: CD, 2×CD | — | 135 | — | — | — | — | |
| Marbles Live | Released: 24 October 2005; Label: Intact; Formats: CD | — | — | — | — | — | — | |
| Recital of the Script | Released: 22 June 2009; Label: EMI; Formats: 2×CD | — | — | — | — | — | — | |
| Live from Loreley | Released: 22 June 2009; Label: EMI; Formats: 2×CD | — | — | — | — | — | — | |
| Early Stages: The Highlights | Released: 11 March 2013; Label: EMI; Formats: 2×CD, digital download | — | — | — | — | — | — | |
| Somewhere in London | Released: 19 September 2013; Label: Madfish; Formats: 2×CD+DVD | — | — | — | — | — | — | |
| Marbles in the Park | Released: 20 January 2017; Label: earMUSIC; Formats: 2×CD, 3×LP, digital download | — | — | 60 | 89 | — | — | |
| Holidays in Eden Live | Released: 19 January 2018; Label: earMUSIC; Formats: 2×CD; Limited edition retail release of Racket 43 | — | — | — | — | — | — | |
| Size Matters | Released: 19 January 2018; Label: earMUSIC; Formats: 2×CD; Limited edition retail release of Racket 34 | — | — | — | — | — | — | |
| Unplugged at the Walls | Released: 23 March 2018; Label: earMUSIC; Formats: 2×CD; Limited edition retail release of Racket 10 | — | — | — | — | — | — | |
| Tumbling Down the Years | Released: 23 March 2018; Label: earMUSIC; Formats: 2×CD; Limited edition retail release of Racket 33 | — | — | — | — | — | — | |
| Smoke | Released: 25 May 2018; Label: earMUSIC; Formats: 2×CD; Limited edition retail release of Racket 28 | — | — | — | — | — | — | |
| Mirrors | Released: 25 May 2018; Label: earMUSIC; Formats: 2×CD; Limited edition retail release of Racket 29 | — | — | — | — | — | — | |
| Happiness is Cologne | Released: 6 July 2018; Label: earMUSIC; Formats: 2×CD; Limited edition retail release of Racket 32 | — | — | — | — | — | — | |
| Popular Music | Released: 6 July 2018; Label: earMUSIC; Formats: 2×CD; Limited edition retail release of Racket 25 | — | — | — | — | — | — | |
| All One Tonight | Released: 27 July 2018; Label: earMUSIC; Formats: 2×CD, 4×LP, digital download | — | 143 | 21 | 83 | — | — | |
| Live in Glasgow | Released: 2019; Label: earMUSIC; Formats: CD; Limited edition retail release of Racket 3 | — | — | — | — | — | — | |
| Brave Live 2013 | Released: 2019; Label: earMUSIC; Formats: 2×CD; Limited edition retail release of Racket 51 | — | — | — | — | — | — | |
| With Friends at St David's | Released: 23 July 2021; Label: earMUSIC; Formats: 2×CD, 3×LP; Retail release of Racket 67 | — | — | — | — | — | — | |
| An Hour Before It's Dark – Live in Port Zelande 2023 | Released: 21 June 2024; Label: earMUSIC; Formats: 2×CD, 3×LP; Retail release of Racket 71 | — | — | — | — | — | — | |
"—" denotes releases that did not chart or were not released in that territory.

=== Compilation albums ===
The table below only lists the compilations whose release was approved by the band. There have also been several unofficial compilations, generally issued on budget labels without the band's consent or approval over track list, artwork etc.

| Title | Album details | Peak chart positions | | | | |
| Title | Album details | UK | GER | NL | SWI | US |
|---|---|---|---|---|---|---|
| Brief Encounter | Released: April 1986; Label: EMI; Formats: LP, MC | — | 42 | — | — | 67 |
| B'Sides Themselves | Released: 4 January 1988; Label: EMI; Formats: CD, LP, MC | 64 | — | 52 | — | — |
| A Singles Collection 1982–1992 | Released: 8 June 1992; Label: EMI; Formats: CD, LP, MC; Released in the US as Six of One, Half-Dozen of the Other | 27 | 46 | 31 | 38 | — |
| The Best of Both Worlds | Released: 24 February 1997; Label: EMI; Formats: 2×CD, 4×LP | 88 | — | 58 | — | — |
| The Best of Marillion | Released: 22 July 2003; Label: EMI; Formats: CD | — | — | — | — | — |
| Best Sounds | Released: 28 April 2014; Label: Racket; Formats: CD; Latin America-only release | — | — | — | — | — |
"—" denotes releases that did not chart or were not released in that territory.

=== Box sets ===
| Title | Album details |
|---|---|
| The Singles '82–88' | Released: July 2000; Label: EMI; Formats: 12×CDS; Reissued in 2009 as a 3-CD box |
| Singles Box Volume 2 '89–'95 | Released: 12 October 2002; Label: EMI; Formats: 12×CDS; Reissued in 2013 as a 4-CD box |
| Early Stages – The Official Bootleg Box Set | Released: 17 November 2008; Label: EMI; Formats: 6×CD |
| The Official Bootleg Box Set Volume 2 | Released: 28 May 2010; Label: EMI; Formats: 8×CD |

== Singles ==
| Title | Year | Peak chart positions | | | | | | | | | | Album |
| Title | Year | UK | AUS | CAN | GER | IRE | NL | NOR | SWI | US | US Main | Album |
|---|---|---|---|---|---|---|---|---|---|---|---|---|
| "Market Square Heroes" | 1982 | 53 | — | — | — | — | — | — | — | — | — | Non-album single |
| "He Knows You Know" | 1983 | 35 | — | — | — | — | — | — | — | — | 21 | Script for a Jester's Tear |
| "Garden Party" | 1983 | 16 | — | — | — | 15 | — | — | — | — | — | Script for a Jester's Tear |
| "Punch and Judy" | 1984 | 29 | — | — | — | — | — | — | — | — | — | Fugazi |
| "Assassing" | 1984 | 22 | — | — | — | 27 | — | — | — | — | — | Fugazi |
| "Kayleigh" | 1985 | 2 | 88 | 76 | 7 | 4 | 12 | 8 | 19 | 74 | 14 | Misplaced Childhood |
| "Lavender" | 1985 | 5 | — | — | 39 | 5 | — | — | — | — | — | Misplaced Childhood |
| "Heart of Lothian" | 1985 | 29 | — | — | 51 | 21 | — | — | — | — | — | Misplaced Childhood |
| "Lady Nina" (US-only release) | 1986 | — | — | — | — | — | — | — | — | — | 30 | Brief Encounter |
| "Welcome to the Garden Party" (Germany-only release) | 1986 | — | — | — | — | — | — | — | — | — | — | Non-album single |
| "Incommunicado" | 1987 | 6 | — | — | 22 | 4 | 25 | — | 23 | — | 24 | Clutching at Straws |
| "Sugar Mice" | 1987 | 22 | — | — | 59 | 17 | 45 | — | — | — | — | Clutching at Straws |
| "Warm Wet Circles" | 1987 | 22 | — | — | — | 20 | 67 | — | — | — | — | Clutching at Straws |
| "Freaks" | 1988 | 24 | — | — | — | — | 84 | — | — | — | — | The Thieving Magpie |
| "Hooks in You" | 1989 | 30 | — | — | 71 | — | 58 | — | — | — | 49 | Seasons End |
| "The Uninvited Guest" | 1989 | 53 | — | — | — | — | 85 | — | — | — | — | Seasons End |
| "Easter" | 1990 | 34 | — | — | — | — | — | — | — | — | — | Seasons End |
| "Cover My Eyes (Pain and Heaven)" | 1991 | 34 | — | — | 73 | — | 14 | — | — | — | — | Holidays in Eden |
| "No One Can" | 1991 | 33 | — | — | — | — | — | — | — | — | — | Holidays in Eden |
| "Dry Land" | 1991 | 34 | — | — | — | — | — | — | — | — | — | Holidays in Eden |
| "Sympathy" | 1992 | 17 | — | — | — | — | 26 | — | — | — | — | A Singles Collection |
| "No One Can" (reissue) | 1992 | 26 | — | — | — | — | — | — | — | — | — | A Singles Collection |
| "The Great Escape" | 1994 | — | — | — | — | — | 38 | — | — | — | — | Brave |
| "The Hollow Man" | 1994 | 30 | — | — | — | — | — | — | — | — | — | Brave |
| "Alone Again in the Lap of Luxury" | 1994 | 53 | — | — | — | — | — | — | — | — | — | Brave |
| "Beautiful" | 1995 | 29 | — | — | — | — | 46 | — | — | — | — | Afraid of Sunlight |
| "Man of a Thousand Faces" | 1997 | 98 | — | — | — | — | — | — | — | — | — | This Strange Engine |
| "Eighty Days" | 1997 | 161 | — | — | — | — | — | — | — | — | — | This Strange Engine |
| "These Chains" | 1998 | 78 | — | — | — | — | — | — | — | — | — | Radiation |
| "Between You and Me" / "Map of the World" | 2001 | — | — | — | — | — | — | — | — | — | — | Anoraknophobia |
| "You're Gone" | 2004 | 7 | — | — | — | — | 8 | — | — | — | — | Marbles |
| "Don't Hurt Yourself" | 2004 | 16 | — | — | — | — | 35 | — | — | — | — | Marbles |
| "The Damage" | 2004 | — (Note: "The Damage" was released prior to downloads becoming eligible for the UK Singles Chart; however, it reached number 2 on the UK Official Download Chart.) | — | — | — | — | — | — | — | — | — | Marbles Live |
| "See It Like a Baby" | 2007 | 45 | — | — | — | — | — | — | — | — | — | Somewhere Else |
| "Thankyou Whoever You Are" | 2007 | 15 | — | — | — | — | 6 | — | — | — | — | Somewhere Else |
| "Whatever Is Wrong with You" | 2008 | — | — | — | — | — | — | — | — | — | — | Happiness Is the Road |
| "The Carol of the Bells" | 2013 | 146 | — | — | — | — | — | — | — | — | — | Non-album single |
| "Living in F E A R" | 2017 | — | — | — | — | — | — | — | — | — | — | Fuck Everyone and Run (F E A R) |
| "Be Hard on Yourself" | 2021 | — | — | — | — | — | — | — | — | — | — | An Hour Before It's Dark |
| "Murder Machines" | 2021 | — | — | — | — | — | — | — | — | — | — | An Hour Before It's Dark |
"—" denotes releases that did not chart or were not released in that territory.

== Videos ==
=== Music videos ===
| Year | Music Video | Album | Director |
|---|---|---|---|
| 1982 | "Market Square Heroes" | Non-album single | Derek Burbidge |
| 1983 | "He Knows You Know" | Script for a Jester's Tear | Simon Milne |
| 1983 | "Garden Party" | Script for a Jester's Tear | Simon Milne |
| 1984 | "Punch and Judy" | Fugazi | Top Of The Pops appearance |
| 1984 | "Assassing" | Fugazi | Simon Milne |
| 1985 | "Kayleigh" | Misplaced Childhood | Clive Richardson |
| 1985 | "Lavender" | Misplaced Childhood | Clive Richardson |
| 1985 | "Heart of Lothian" | Misplaced Childhood | Francis Megahy |
| 1986 | "Lady Nina" | Brief Encounter | Julian Caidan |
| 1986 | "Garden Party (Live)" | Welcome to the Garden Party | Live video |
| 1987 | "Incommunicado" | Clutching at Straws | Julian Caidan |
| 1987 | "Sugar Mice" | Clutching at Straws | Julian Caidan |
| 1987 | "Warm Wet Circles" | Clutching at Straws | Julian Caidan |
| 1988 | "Freaks (Live)" | The Thieving Magpie | Live video |
| 1989 | "Hooks in You" | Seasons End | Nick Morris |
| 1989 | "The Uninvited Guest" | Seasons End | Nick Brandt |
| 1990 | "Easter" | Seasons End | Paul Cox |
| 1991 | "Cover My Eyes (Pain and Heaven)" | Holidays in Eden | Howard Greenhalgh |
| 1991 | "No One Can" | Holidays in Eden | Howard Greenhalgh |
| 1991 | "Dry Land" | Holidays in Eden | Howard Greenhalgh |
| 1992 | "Sympathy" | A Singles Collection | Bill Smith |
| 1994 | "The Great Escape" | Brave | Richard Stanley |
| 1994 | "The Hollow Man" | Brave | Richard Stanley |
| 1994 | "Alone Again in the Lap of Luxury" | Brave | Richard Stanley |
| 1995 | "Beautiful" | Afraid of Sunlight | Russell Young |
| 1997 | "Man of a Thousand Faces" | This Strange Engine | Unknown |
| 1998 | "These Chains" | Radiation | John Kelly |
| 1999 | "Deserve" | Marillion.com | John Kelly |
| 2001 | "Map of the World" | Anoraknophobia | Live video |
| 2004 | "You're Gone" | Marbles | Unknown |
| 2004 | "Don't Hurt Yourself" | Marbles | Unknown |
| 2005 | "The Damage" | Marbles | Live video |
| 2007 | "Most Toys" | Somewhere Else | Live video |
| 2007 | "Thankyou Whoever You Are" | Somewhere Else | Live video |
| 2008 | "Whatever Is Wrong With You" | Happiness Is the Road | Tim Sidwell |
| 2009 | "This Train Is My Life" | Less Is More Live | Live video |
| 2012 | "Power" | Sounds That Can't Be Made | Live video |
| 2012 | "Sounds That Can't Be Made" | Sounds That Can't Be Made | Live video |
| 2013 | "Carol of the Bells" | Christmas single | Unknown |
| 2014 | "Happy Xmas (War Is Over)" | Christmas single | Unknown |
| 2017 | "Living in F E A R (Album Version)" | Fuck Everyone and Run (F E A R) | Unknown |
| 2017 | "Living in F E A R (Single Version)" | Fuck Everyone and Run (F E A R) | Unknown |
| 2018 | "Seasons End" | Seasons End | Screen Media video |
| 2019 | "Estonia" | With Friends from the Orchestra | Unknown |
| 2019 | "Fantastic Place" | With Friends from the Orchestra | Unknown |
| 2022 | "Murder Machines" | An Hour Before It's Dark | Unknown |
| 2022 | "A Friend Of The Earth" | Earth Day single | Unknown |
| 2023 | "I Believe in Father Christmas" | Christmas single | Unknown |

=== VHS releases ===
| Year | Title | Notes |
|---|---|---|
| 1983 | Recital of the Script | Live performance from Script for a Jester's Tear tour at Hammersmith Odeon, 1983 |
| 1984 | Grendel / The Web EP | Two additional live tracks from same performance as Recital of the Script |
| 1986 | The Videos 1982–1986 | All of the band's promo videos to that point |
| 1987 | Incommunicado / Sugar Mice | Promo videos for first two singles from Clutching at Straws |
| 1987 | Live from Loreley | Live performance from Clutching at Straws tour in Germany, 1987. Reissued in 1995 in VHS / CD package. |
| 1990 | From Stoke Row to Ipanema ('A Year in the Life...') | Documentary about making of Seasons End and excerpts of live performance from Season's End tour in Leicester, 1990 |
| 1992 | A Singles Collection | Promo videos for the tracks which appear on A Singles Collection |
| 1995 | Brave | Film based on Brave |

=== DVD / BD releases ===
| Year | Title | Notes |
|---|---|---|
| 2002 | The EMI Singles Collection | The promo videos for all the EMI-era singles (1982 to 1996) and includes "Deserve" as Easter egg |
| 2003 | Recital of the Script | Includes all tracks from original VHS release and Grendel / The Web EP |
| 2003 | From Stoke Row to Ipanema ('A Year in the Life...') | Includes original VHS documentary and complete live performance from Leicester, 1990 |
| 2004 | Live from Loreley | Same as original VHS release |
| 2004 | Brave | Same as original VHS release but with "Making of" documentary as extra |
| 2004 | Marbles on the Road | Retail release on the Intact label of Racket 96 as single DVD |
| 2011 | Somewhere in London | Retail release on the Madfish label of Racket 100 as double DVD |
| 2011 | Live from Cadogan Hall | Retail release on the earMUSIC label of Racket 103 as double DVD and BD |
| 2017 | Marbles in the Park | Retail release on the earMUSIC label of the Saturday night show from Racket 112 as DVD and BD |
| 2018 | All One Tonight | Retail release on the earMUSIC label of Racket 113 as double DVD and double BD |
| 2021 | With Friends at St David's | Retail release on the earMUSIC label of Racket 115 as double DVD and double BD |
| 2024 | An Hour Before It's Dark – Live at Port Zélande 2023 | Retail release on the earMUSIC label of Racket 118 as DVD and BD |

The tables above only list videos which were released to retail on a major label. In addition, there have been many video releases on the band's own Racket Records label, which are detailed separately in the relevant section below.

== Racket Records releases ==
Racket Records is Marillion's own label – Racket releases are only available direct from Marillion's online shop. Some of the early releases are now out of print as CDs and DVDs, but most are available as audio downloads.

=== Audio releases ===
| Year | Catalogue # | Title | Notes |
|---|---|---|---|
| 1992 | Racket 1 | Live at the Borderline | The Web fan club convention show in London, 1992. Reissued in 1997. Later reissued as a Front Row Club release (FRC-004) |
| 1992 | Racket 2 | Live in Caracas | Live performance in Caracas (Venezuela), 1992. Reissued in 1997. |
| 1993 | Racket 3 | Live in Glasgow | Live performance in Scotland, 1989. Reissued in 1997. Later reissued as a Front Row Club release (FRC-005) |
| 1995 | Racket 6 | The Making of Brave (2 CD) | The Making of Brave, reissued 2001 to match other From Dusk 'til Dot releases |
| 1998 | Racket 7 | Tales from the Engine Room | Remixes of tracks from This Strange Engine by The Positive Light, subsequently released to retail with an extra track |
| 1998 | Racket 8 | Rochester (2 CD) | Live performance in USA, 1997, given away to those who contributed to the "Tour Fund" |
| 1998 | Racket 9 | Piston Broke (2 CD) | Live performances from This Strange Engine tour in Europe, 1997 |
| 1999 | Racket 10 | Unplugged at The Walls (2 CD) | Acoustic performance in Oswestry, 1998 |
| 1999 | Racket 11 | Zodiac | The Web fan club convention show in Oxford, 1999 |
| 2000 | Racket 12 | marillion.co.uk | Free companion disc to marillion.com, reissued with different track list 2002 (Racket 12A) & 2005 (Racket 12B) |
| 2001 | Racket 15 | Crash Course – An Introduction to Marillion | Free sampler, reissued with different track list 2002 (Racket 15A), 2004 (15B), 2006 (15C), 2007 (15D), 2008 (15E), 2009 (15F), 2012 (15G) & 2017 (15H) |
| 2001 | Racket 17 | ReFracted! (2 CD) | From Dusk 'til Dot volume 1 – The Making of Afraid of Sunlight |
| 2001 | Racket 18 | Another DAT at the Office (2 CD) | From Dusk 'til Dot volume 2 – The Making of This Strange Engine |
| 2002 | Racket 19 | Fallout (2 CD) | From Dusk 'til Dot volume 3 – The Making of Radiation |
| 2002 | Racket 20 | Caught in the Net (2 CD) | From Dusk 'til Dot volume 4 – The Making of marillion.com |
| 2002 | Racket 22 | Brave Live 2002 | Friday night from Marillion Weekend 2002 – performance of entire Brave album |
| 2003 | Racket 23 | View from the Balcony | Front Row Club sampler, reissued with different track list 2005 (Racket 23A) |
| 2004 | Racket 24 | Remixomatosis (2 CD) | Fan remixes of tracks from Anoraknophobia |
| 2005 | Racket 25 | Popular Music (2 CD) | Saturday night from Marillion Weekend 2003 – setlist of songs voted for by fans |
| 2005 | Racket 26 | Marbles by the Sea (2 CD) | Friday night from Marillion Weekend 2005 – performance of entire Marbles album |
| 2006 | Racket 27 | Unzipped (2 CD) | The Making of Anoraknophobia |
| 2006 | Racket 28 | Smoke | Saturday night from Marillion Weekend 2005 – setlist of uptempo songs |
| 2006 | Racket 29 | Mirrors (2 CD) | Sunday night from Marillion Weekend 2005 – setlist of mellow songs |
| 2007 | Racket 30 | Friends | Saturday night from Marillion Weekend 2007 – setlist of covers and rarities |
| 2007 | Racket 31 | Family (2 CD) | Sunday night from Marillion Weekend 2007 – setlist of 'classic' Marillion songs |
| 2009 | Racket 32 | Happiness is Cologne (2 CD) | Live performance from Happiness is the Road tour in Germany, 2008 |
| 2010 | Racket 33 | Tumbling Down the Years (2 CD) | Saturday night from Marillion Weekend (Holland) 2009 – setlist of one track per year in chronological order |
| 2010 | Racket 34 | Size Matters (2 CD) | Sunday night from Marillion Weekend (Holland) 2009 – setlist of long 'epic' songs |
| 2010 | Racket 35 | Keep the Noise Down | Sampler from Less Is More acoustic tour |
| 2010 | Racket 36 | Live in Montréal – Saturday (2 CD) | Saturday night from Marillion Weekend (Canada) 2009 – setlist of one track per year in chronological order |
| 2010 | Racket 37 | Live in Montréal – Sunday (2 CD) | Sunday night from Marillion Weekend (Canada) 2009 – setlist of long 'epic' songs |
| 2010 | Racket 38 | Live from Cadogan Hall (2 CD) | Live performance from Less Is More acoustic tour in London, 2009 |
| 2011 | Racket 39 | Afraid of Sunlight Live 2003 | Friday night from Marillion Weekend 2003 – performance of entire Afraid of Sunlight album |
| 2011 | Racket 40 | This Strange Engine Live 2007 | Friday night from Marillion Weekend 2007 – performance of entire This Strange Engine album |
| 2011 | Racket 41 | Live in Montréal – Friday (2 CD) | Friday night from Marillion Weekend (Canada) 2009 – performance of entire Seasons End album |
| 2011 | Racket 42 | Seasons End Live 2009 (2 CD) | Friday night from Marillion Weekend (Holland) 2009 – performance of entire Seasons End album |
| 2011 | Racket 43 | Holidays in Eden Live 2011 (2 CD) | Friday night from Marillion Weekend (Holland) 2011 – performance of entire Holidays in Eden album |
| 2011 | Racket 44 | Best. Live (2 CD) | Compilation of tracks from previous Racket live releases |
| 2012 | Racket 45 | A-Z (3 CD) | Saturday night from Marillion Weekend (Holland) 2011 – setlist in alphabetical order, one track per letter |
| 2012 | Racket 47 | The Glow Must Go On (2 CD) | Sunday night from Marillion Weekend (Holland) 2011 – setlist voted for by fans on the night with glowsticks |
| 2013 | Racket 48 | Best of Montréal (2 CD) | Highlights from Marillion Weekend (Canada) 2011 |
| 2013 | Racket 50 | Best of Leamington (2 CD) | Highlights from Marillion Weekend (UK) 2011 |
| 2013 | Racket 51 | Brave Live 2013 (2 CD) | Saturday night from Marillion Weekend (Holland) 2013 – performance of entire Brave album |
| 2014 | Racket 52 | A Sunday Night Above the Rain – Holland (2 CD) | Sunday night from Marillion Weekend (Holland) 2013 – performance of entire Sounds That Can't Be Made album |
| 2014 | Racket 53 | A Sunday Night Above the Rain – Montréal (2 CD) | Sunday night from Marillion Weekend (Montréal) 2013 – performance of entire Sounds That Can't Be Made album |
| 2014 | Racket 54 | Unsound | Demos from the making of Sounds That Can't Be Made. Not released on CD; only available as download or as bonus audio tracks on Blu-ray version of A Sunday Night Above the Rain |
| 2014 | Racket 55 | A Collection of Recycled Gifts | Compilation of Christmas songs previously released on fan club Christmas CDs, reissued with additional tracks 2021 (Racket 55A) |
| 2015 | Racket 56 | Glass Half Full (3 CD) | The Making of Marbles |
| 2016 | Racket 57 | Waves and Numb3rs (2 CD) | Friday night from Marillion Weekend (Holland) 2015 – performance of entire Anoraknophobia album |
| 2016 | Racket 58 | Marbles in the Park (2 CD) | Saturday night from Marillion Weekend (Holland) 2015 – performance of entire Marbles album |
| 2016 | Racket 59 | Singles Night (2 CD) | Sunday night from Marillion Weekend (Holland) 2015 – setlist of songs released as singles |
| 2017 | Racket 60 | Live in Chile (2 CD) | Live performance at the Teatro Caupolican, Santiago, Chile on 7 May 2016 |
| 2017 | Racket 61 | The Gold - Best of Convention 2017 | Highlights from Marillion Weekends (Chile, UK, Poland and Holland) 2017 |
| 2018 | Racket 62^{1} | All One Tonight (2 CD) | Live performance at the Royal Albert Hall, London on 13 October 2017 |
| 2019 | Racket 62^{1} | marillion.cl/viernes.noche (2 CD) | Friday night from Marillion Weekend (Chile) 2017 |
| 2019 | Racket 63 | marillion.cl/en.el.marquee | Saturday night from Marillion Weekend (Chile) 2017 - performance of songs from Clutching at Straws album |
| 2019 | Racket 64 | marillion.cl/dotcom (2 CD) | Sunday night from Marillion Weekend (Chile) 2017 - performance of entire marillion.com album |
| 2019 | Racket 65 | Satellite Navigation (3 CD) | The Making of Happiness is the Road |
| 2019 | Racket 66 | Mr Taurus (2 CD) | The Making of Somewhere Else |
| 2020 | Racket 67 | With Friends at St David's (2 CD) | Live performance at St David's Hall, Cardiff on 16 November 2019 |
| 2022 | Racket 68 | Distant Lights (4 CD) | Friday (UK) and Sunday (Holland) nights from Marillion Weekend 2019 |
| 2023 | Racket 69 | Silent and High (2 CD) | The Making of Sounds That Can't Be Made |
| 2023 | Racket 70 | Panning for Gold (2 CD) | The Making of F E A R |
| 2023 | Racket 71 | An Hour Before It's Dark – Live in Port Zelande 2023 (2 CD) | Saturday night from Marillion Weekend (Holland) 2023 - performance of entire An Hour Before It's Dark album |
| 2024 | Racket 72 | The Remains Of The Weekend - Friday (2CD) | Friday night from Marillion Weekend (Holland) 2023 |
| 2024 | Racket 73 | The Remains Of The Weekend - Sunday (2CD) | Sunday night from Marillion Weekend (Holland) 2023 |
| 2025 | Racket 74 | Pulling Shapes out of the Night (2CD) | The Making of Holidays in Eden |
| 2025 | Racket 75 | DNA (2CD) | The Making of An Hour Before It's Dark |

^{1}Racket 62 was used in error for two different releases.

==== Releases by other artists ====
Racket have also released a small number of titles by artists other than Marillion (usually band members' side projects).

| Year | Catalogue # | Artist | Title |
|---|---|---|---|
| 1994 | Racket 4 | John Wesley | Under the Red and White Sky |
| 1995 | Racket 5 | Michael Hunter | River |
| 2000 | Racket 13 | How We Live | Dry Land |
| 2001 | Racket 14 | The Wishing Tree | Carnival of Souls |
| 2001 | Racket 16 | Ian Mosley & Ben Castle | Postmankind |
| 2002 | Racket 21 | Various | AWOL (sampler of Marillion members' solo projects) |
| 2012 | Racket 46 | Various | Playing Away (sampler of Marillion members' solo projects) |
| 2013 | Racket 49 | Michael Hunter | River (reissued) |

==== Abbey Road Live Here Now releases ====
Three live concerts at The Forum in London were recorded by Abbey Road Live and released on CD-R discs for sale at the venue immediately after the shows finished. These discs are joint productions between Abbey Road Live and Racket Records, and therefore are not in the regular catalogue number sequence.

| Year | Catalogue # | Title | Notes |
|---|---|---|---|
| 2008 | HOTR081119 | Happiness On The Road (2 CD) | Live performance at The Forum, London, 19 November 2008 |
| 2012 | SL120916 | Sounds Live (2 CD) | Live performance at The Forum, London, 16 September 2012 |
| 2014 | XMAS111214 | Live at The Forum (2 CD) | Live performance at The Forum, London, 11 December 2014 |

==== Concerts Live release ====
The live performance at the High Voltage Festival in London was released after the festival on the Concerts Live label. This disc was a joint production between Concerts Live and Intact Records, a sister label to Racket Records which is also run by the band, used for retail releases of non-major label titles.

| Year | Catalogue # | Title | Notes |
|---|---|---|---|
| 2010 | CLCD285 | High Voltage (2 CD) | Live performance at the High Voltage Festival, Victoria Park, London 25 July 2010 |

=== Video releases ===
| Year | Catalogue # | Title | Notes |
|---|---|---|---|
| 2000 | Racket 91P/N/D | Shot in the Dark (VHS / DVD) | The Web fan club convention show in Oxford, 1999 |
| 2002 | Racket 92D | A Piss-Up in a Brewery (DVD) | Webcast of live performance from Bass Museum, 2000. Reissued in 2010. |
| 2002 | Racket 93D | Brave Live 2002 (DVD) | Friday night from Marillion Weekend 2002 – complete performance of Brave album |
| 2003 | Racket 94D | Before First Light (DVD) | Friday night from Marillion Weekend 2003 – complete performance of Afraid of Sunlight album |
| 2003 | Racket 95D | Christmas in the Chapel (DVD) | Live performance in London, 2002 |
| 2004 | Racket 96P/N | Marbles on the Road (2 DVD) | Live performance from Marbles tour in London, 2004 – also released to retail as a single disc |
| 2005 | Racket 97P/N | Wish You Were Here (4 DVD) | Live performances from first two Marillion Weekends in 2002 and 2003 |
| 2006 | Racket 98P/N | Colours and Sound (DVD) | Behind-the-scenes documentary of Marbles tour |
| 2007 | Racket 99 | Bootleg Butlins (DVD) | Saturday and Sunday nights from Marillion Weekend 2005 |
| 2007 | Racket 100P/N | Somewhere in London (2 DVD) | Live performance from Somewhere Else tour in London, 2007 – subsequently released to retail |
| 2008 | Racket 101N | This Strange Convention (2 DVD) | Friday, Saturday and Sunday nights from Marillion Weekend 2007 |
| 2010 | Racket 102N/BD | Out of Season (3 DVD / 3 BD) ^{1} | Friday, Saturday and Sunday nights from Marillion Weekend (Holland) 2009 |
| 2010 | Racket 103N/BD | Live from Cadogan Hall (2 DVD / BD) | Live performance from Less Is More acoustic tour in London, 2009 |
| 2010 | Racket 39N ^{2} | M-Tube (DVD) | Sampler of previous Racket live DVDs |
| 2011 | Racket 104N | Live in Montréal (3 DVD) | Friday, Saturday and Sunday nights from Marillion Weekend (Canada) 2009 |
| 2012 | Racket 105P/N/BD | Holidays in Zélande (5 DVD / 3 BD) | Friday, Saturday and Sunday nights from Marillion Weekend (Holland) 2011 |
| 2012 | Racket 106N ^{3} | A Better Way of Live (DVD) | Sampler of previous Racket live DVDs |
| 2013 | Racket 106N ^{3} | Clocks Already Ticking (2 DVD + 3 CD) | Friday night from Marillion Weekend (UK) 2013 – complete performance of Radiation album, includes both DVDs and CDs |
| 2013 | Racket 107N | Brave Live 2002 (DVD + CD) | Reissue of Friday night from Marillion Weekend 2002, includes both DVD and CD |
| 2013 | Racket 108P/N/BD | Brave Live 2013 (2 DVD / BD) | Saturday night from Marillion Weekend (Holland) 2013 – complete performance of Brave album |
| 2014 | Racket 109N/BD | A Sunday Night Above the Rain (4 DVD / 3 BD) | Sunday nights from Marillion Weekend 2013 in Holland and Montréal – complete performance of Sounds That Can't Be Made album |
| 2015 | Racket 110BD | Breaking Records (2 BD) | Blu-ray re-release of Before First Light and Clocks Already Ticking |
| 2015 | Racket 111N/BD | Unconventional (DVD / BD) | Documentary about Marillion Weekend (Holland) 2015 |
| 2016 | Racket 112N/BD | Out of the Box (3 DVD / 3 BD) | Friday, Saturday and Sunday nights from Marillion Weekend (Holland) 2015 |
| 2018 | Racket 113N/BD | All One Tonight (2 DVD / 2 BD) | Live performance at the Royal Albert Hall, London on 13 October 2017 |
| 2019 | Racket 114DVD/BD | marillion.cl (3 DVD / 2 BD) | Friday, Saturday and Sunday nights from Marillion Weekend (Chile) 2017 |
| 2020 | Racket 115DVD/BD | With Friends at St David's (2 DVD / 2 BD) | Live performance at St David's Hall, Cardiff on 16 November 2019 |
| 2022 | Racket 116N/BD | Distant Lights (2 DVD / 2 BD) | Friday (UK) and Sunday (Holland) nights from Marillion Weekend 2019 |
| 2023 | Racket 117BD | XXI - The Best of the Weekends (BD) | Highlights from 21 years of Marillion Weekends |
| 2023 | Racket 118N/BD | An Hour Before It's Dark – Live in Port Zelande 2023 (2 DVD / BD) | Saturday night from Marillion Weekend (Holland) 2023 - performance of songs from An Hour Before It's Dark album |
| 2024 | Racket 119N/BD | The Remains of the Weekend – Live Port Zelande 2023 (2 DVD / BD) | Friday and Sunday nights from Marillion Weekend (Holland) 2023 |

^{1} The Blu-ray version of Racket 102 is in standard definition only.

^{2} Racket 39, which is in the sequence used for CD releases, was used for the M-Tube DVD and subsequently reused for a CD release.

^{3} Racket 106 was used in error for two different releases.

The letter suffix to the catalogue number denotes video format:

- N denotes an NTSC DVD
- P denotes a PAL DVD
- D denotes an NTSC DVD
- BD denotes a Blu-ray Disc

Racket 91 was released on PAL and NTSC VHS – the P and N suffixes for this release denote the VHS versions.

Racket 99 has no suffix, and is NTSC-only.

== Fan Club Christmas discs ==
Free issue to Fan Club members only, very limited runs. CDs were released from 1998 to 2008; DVDs were released from 2009 onwards. All titles now out of print, although are available for purchase as download only when taking out or renewing Fan Club membership. Most contain a Christmas message from the band members, one new Christmas-themed song, and an assortment of other tracks.

=== Audio releases ===
| Year | Catalogue # | Title | Notes |
|---|---|---|---|
| 1998 | WEBFREE1 | Happy Christmas Everybody | The Christmas Song; 3 marillion.com excerpts; 4 instrumental Karaoke Mixes. |
| 1999 | WEBFREE2 | Marillion.Christmas | Gabriel's Message; 1 Single Edit; 2 Early Versions; 1 Remix; 3 Acoustic; Beautiful (Children's Chorus). |
| 2000 | WEBFREE3 | A Piss-up in a Brewery | Acoustic performance at Bass Brewery. Later reissued as a Front Row Club release (FRC-011). |
| 2001 | WEBFREE4 | A Very Barry Christmas | I Saw Three Ships; 5 Acoustic; 2 Remixes; 1 Instrumental. |
| 2002 | WEBFREE5 | Santa and his Elvis | Lonely This Christmas; Fruit Of The Wild Rose/Cannibal Surf Babe (Live Medley); 5 Live Radio Session. |
| 2003 | WEBFREE6 | Say Cheese! | Stop The Cavalry; 1 Demo; 3 Live Tracks (including early 'Neverland'); Stille Nacht; 12 Days of Xmas. |
| 2004 | WEBFREE7 | Baubles | 9 Anoraknophobia Fan Remixes not used for Remixomatosis Racket Records Release. |
| 2005 | WEBFREE8 | Merry XMas to our Flock | The Erin Marbles; 14 Tracks from Los Trios Marillos' XM Satellite Radio Session, 2005-06-22. |
| 2006 | WEBFREE9 | The Jingle Book | That's What Friends Are For; 11 Tracks from June 2006 Wianki Festival, Kraków, Poland, 2006-06-24. |
| 2007 | WEBFREE10 | Somewhere Elf | Let It Snow; 8 Tracks from Racket Club Somewhere Else Tour rehearsal performance, 2007-04-01. |
| 2008 | WEBFREE11 | Pudding on the Ritz | Little St. Nick; 5 Jam Sessions; Spoken Word "A Child's Christmas in Wales" by Dylan Thomas. |
| 2014 | WEBFREE17 | Chile for the Time of Year (2 CD) | Live recording from Teatro Caupolican on 16 May 2014 on the last night of the 'Best Sounds' Latin American tour in Santiago, Chile. |
| 2015 | WEBFREE18 | A Monstrously Festive(al) Christmas (2 CD) | Live recording from the Ramblin' Man Festival in Maidstone, Kent on 26 July 2015. |
| 2020 | WEBFREE23 | Christmas 2020 | All I Want For Christmas Is You; Have Yourself A Merry Little Christmas |
| 2021 | WEBFREE24 | An Extended Collection Of Recycled Gifts | Re-release of Racket 55 but with addition of WEBFREE23's two tracks and "A Child's Christmas in Wales" from WEBFREE11. |
| 2022 | WEBFREE25 | Yule Be Glad | Live recording from Hammersmith Apollo, London, England on 27 November 2021 |
| 2023 | WEBFREE26 | Web Christmas 2023 | I Believe In Father Christmas; Live Recording from Marillion Weekend in Port Zelande, Netherlands on 19 March 2023 (Part One) |
| 2024 | WEBFREE27 | What A WDRful Time Of Year | Live recording from the WDR Radio Station, Koln, Germany, 2 July 2017 |

=== Video releases ===
| Year | Catalogue # | Title | Notes |
|---|---|---|---|
| 2009 | WEBFREE12 | Snow De Cologne | Complete Ewerk, Cologne performance, 2008-11-26. |
| 2010 | WEBFREE13 | Ding, Dong Loreley On High... | 'Night of the Prog' festival performance, Germany, 2010-09-04. |
| 2011 | WEBFREE14 | Live at German Space Day 2004 | Filmed at Cologne-Bonn Airport, 2004-09-18. NOTE: Some (or all) of these DVDs have catalog number WEBFREE13 printed on the back cover and actual disc. This is most likely a mistake as WEBFREE13 has already been used for the Ding, Dong Loreley On High release. |
| 2012 | WEBFREE15 | Sleighed Again | HMV Forum, London, 2012-09-16 (four tracks); Elysee Montmartre, Paris, 2007-12-13 (1 track). |
| 2013 | WEBFREE16 | Proggin' around the Christmas Tree | Christmas themed songs Including the video of 'The Carol of the Bells' charity single. |
| 2016 | WEBFREE19 | Festivities, Elation and Rejoicing | Audio recording of Leamington Spa warm-up gig |
| 2017 | WEBFREE20 | Christmas at the Club | Private Racket Club gig; play-through of F E A R album for a specially invited audience. |
| 2018 | WEBFREE21 | A Star in the East | Live concert at Club Citta, Kawasaki, Japan on 16 September 2018. |
| 2019 | WEBFREE22 | Christmas Past | Live concert in Holland in 2017. |

== Front Row Club releases ==
The Front Row Club was a subscription-only service by which CDs of raw concert recordings, originally made by the band for their own reference, were released. Members paid for a subscription (initially lasting six releases; later reduced to four releases), and as the shows were released, they were automatically mailed to members. There were also occasional optional releases, which were only mailed on request - these were generally reissues of previously released material. The only FRC issue which was available to non-subscribers was the Curtain Call box set - this was the only FRC release of material recorded before Steve Hogarth joined the band, and was sold via both Marillion and Fish's online stores, as well as being an optional FRC release.

After the release of FRC-040 in January 2008, the FRC changed to a download-only digital distribution format. This lasted for a further three issues - after FRC-043, the FRC was closed. (Starting with the Happiness On The Road tour, Marillion moved to publishing the majority of their live performances from desk recordings as digital downloads, rendering the FRC redundant.)

Only a limited number of copies were manufactured for each FRC release (believed to be no more than 3,000) and were not re-issued once sold out. Most of the FRC releases are now out of print on CD, but are still available from the band's website as downloads.

| Year | Catalogue # | Recorded | Venue | City | Country | Notes |
|---|---|---|---|---|---|---|
| 2002 | FRC-001 | 1998-11-09 | Ludwigshalle | Dieburg | Germany | |
| 2002 | FRC-002 | 1999-11-18 | Academy | Manchester | England | |
| 2002 | FRC-003 | 1995-06-23 | Luxor | Arnhem | Netherlands | Supplied with free exclusive FRC T-shirt |
| 2002 | FRC-004 | 1992-05-09 | The Borderline | London | England | Optional release - reissue of Racket release Racket 1 |
| 2002 | FRC-005 | 1989-12-04 | Barrowlands | Glasgow | Scotland | Optional release - reissue of Racket release Racket 3 |
| 2002 | FRC-006 | N/A | N/A | N/A | N/A | Optional release - Michael Hunter, River |
| 2002 | FRC-007 | 1991-10-19 | Salle de Fetes Beaulieu | Lausanne | Switzerland | |
| 2002 | FRC-008 | 1997-09-06 | Le Spectrum | Montréal | Canada | First four tracks from Irving Plaza, New York, 11 September 1997 |
| 2002 | FRC-009 | 1996-04-28 | Forum | London | England | |
| 2003 | FRC-010 | 1990-12-12 | Moles Club | Bath | England | |
| 2003 | FRC-011 | 2000-11-17 | Bass Brewery Museum | Burton-On-Trent | England | Optional release - reissue of Fan Club CD WEBFREE3 |
| 2003 | FRC-012 | 2000-12-12 | Sala Bikini | Barcelona | Spain | |
| 2003 | FRC-013 | 1995-09-29 | Ahoy | Rotterdam | Netherlands | |
| 2003 | FRC-014 | 1990-02-22 | The Ritz | Roseville, MI | USA | |
| 2004 | FRC-015A | 1983-10-01 | Rundsporthalle | Baunatal | Germany | Optional release - Curtain Call box set of Fish-era shows |
| 2004 | FRC-015B | 1986-02-03 | Hammersmith Odeon | London | England | Optional release - Curtain Call box set of Fish-era shows |
| 2004 | FRC-015C | 1988-01-26 | Palatrussardi | Milan | Italy | Optional release - Curtain Call box set of Fish-era shows |
| 2003 | FRC-016 | 1998-01-10 | Ateneu Popular de Nou Barris | Barcelona | Spain | |
| 2003 | FRC-017 | 2001-10-13 | 013 | Tilburg | Netherlands | |
| 2004 | FRC-018 | 1992-09-02 | E-Werk | Köln | Germany | |
| 2004 | FRC-019 | 1998-11-04 | Civic | Wolverhampton | England | |
| 2004 | FRC-020 | 1994-05-27 | Pumpehuset | Copenhagen | Denmark | Recording from both 27 and 28 May |
| 2004 | FRC-021 | 2001-02-28 | Dingwalls | London | England | |
| 2004 | FRC-022 | 1997-05-29 | Tivoli | Utrecht | Netherlands | |
| 2004 | FRC-023 | 2004-04-30 | Civic Centre | Aylesbury | England | |
| 2005 | FRC-024 | 1998-11-18 | Elysée Montmartre | Paris | France | |
| 2005 | FRC-025 | 1999-12-04 | Capitol | Mannheim | Germany | |
| 2005 | FRC-026 | 1999-07-25 | Zodiac | Oxford | England | |
| 2005 | FRC-027 | 1995-09-17 | Corn Exchange | Cambridge | England | |
| 2005 | FRC-028 | 1992-10-05 | Olympia | São Paulo | Brazil | |
| 2005 | FRC-029 | 2004-10-08 | Theater of the Living Arts | Philadelphia, PA | USA | |
| 2005 | FRC-030 | 1994-03-20 | PC69 | Bielefeld | Germany | |
| 2006 | FRC-031 | 1997-09-20 | The Rave | Milwaukee, WI | USA | |
| 2006 | FRC-032 | 2002-08-03 | Richmond Live Festival | Richmond | England | |
| 2006 | FRC-033 | 1992-09-05 | Wembley Arena | London | England | |
| 2006 | FRC-034 | 2005-12-03 | Vredenburg Muziekcentrum | Utrecht | Netherlands | |
| 2006 | FRC-035 | 2005-12-05 | Forum | London | England | Free bonus issue with FRC-34 |
| 2007 | FRC-036 | 1989-10-05 | Palais Des Sports | Besançon | France | |
| 2007 | FRC-037 | 2005-06-12 | Bowery Ballroom | New York City, NY | USA | Los Trios Marillos |
| 2007 | FRC-038 | 2007-05-22 | Klub Stodola | Warsaw | Poland | |
| 2007 | FRC-039 | 1991-09-16 | Royal Court Theatre | Liverpool | England | |
| 2008 | FRC-040 | 2007-12-12 | Paradiso | Amsterdam | Netherlands | |
| 2008 | FRC-041 | 1995-08-15 | The Chance | Poughkeepsie, NY | USA | Download only |
| 2008 | FRC-042 | 2005-09-11 | The Great American Music Hall | San Francisco, CA | USA | Download only; Los Trios Marillos |
| 2008 | FRC-043 | 2007-11-30 | The Academy | Manchester | England | Download only |
