= The Best of Both Worlds (Marillion album) =

Greatest hits album by Marillion
- Released: 24 February 1997
- Recorded: 1982–1996
- Genre: Neo-prog; pop rock
- Label: EMI
- Producer: Nick Tauber; Chris Kimsey; Christopher Neil; Nick Davis; Dave Meegan

Marillion chronology
Made Again (1996)	The Best of Both Worlds (1997)	This Strange Engine (1997)

The Best of Both Worlds is a two-disc compilation album by British neo-prog band Marillion released in 1997 by EMI Records, who the band had been signed to from their debut in 1982 until being dropped in 1995. The title refers to Marillion's two distinct "eras" with lead singers Fish (1980–1988) and Steve Hogarth (since 1989). By the time this compilation was released, both line-ups had recorded four studio albums each.

== Content ==
The second Marillion best-of since the 14-track one-disc compilation A Singles Collection (known as Six of One, Half a Dozen of the Other in the US) from 1992, this one additionally contains material from Brave (1994) and Afraid of Sunlight (1996). Two different covers were created for the compilation, one by Mark Wilkinson, who had worked for the band during the Fish years, and one by Bill Smith Studio, who took over after Fish's and Wilkinson's departure. The booklet was printed so that either of the covers could be displayed in the jewel case according to personal preference. The track list, comprising 29 songs, was put together by Lucy Jordache, then the manager responsible for the band in EMI, in close collaboration with the band's fans' mailing list, "Freaks" (named after the eponymous song). Jordache also motivated singers Fish and Hogarth to contribute liner notes—at a time when both camps were not yet on friendly terms again—by telling each of them the other had already agreed to do so.

Although the compilation did not contain any previously unreleased material, it was attractive to existing fans as it included various edited versions that were not easily accessible at the time, resulting in "better than expected" sales.

== Track listing ==
Disc one
No.	Title	Writer(s)	Origin	Length
1.	"Script for a Jester's Tear"	Derek Dick; Steve Rothery; Peter Trewavas; Michael Pointer	Script for a Jester's Tear	8:44
2.	"Market Square Heroes" (B'Sides version)	Dick; Rothery; Trewavas; Pointer; Mark Kelly	non-album single	3:57
3.	"He Knows You Know" (album version)	Dick; Rothery; Trewavas; Pointer; Kelly; Brian Jelliman; Diz Minnitt	Script for a Jester's Tear	5:22
4.	"Forgotten Sons"	Dick; Rothery; Trewavas; Pointer; Kelly; Jelliman; Minnitt	Script for a Jester's Tear	8:19
5.	"Garden Party"	Dick; Rothery; Trewavas; Pointer; Kelly; Jelliman; Minnitt	Script for a Jester's Tear	7:15
6.	"Assassing" (single version)	Dick; Rothery; Trewavas; Kelly	Fugazi	3:37
7.	"Punch and Judy"	Dick; Rothery; Trewavas; Kelly; Jonathan Mover	Fugazi	3:18
8.	"Kayleigh" (single version)	Dick; Rothery; Trewavas; Kelly; Ian Mosley	Misplaced Childhood	3:33
9.	"Lavender" (single version)	Dick; Rothery; Trewavas; Kelly; Mosley	Misplaced Childhood	3:41
10.	"Heart of Lothian" (single version)	Dick; Rothery; Trewavas; Kelly; Mosley	Misplaced Childhood	3:37
11.	"Incommunicado"	Dick; Rothery; Trewavas; Kelly; Mosley	Clutching at Straws	5:16
12.	"Warm Wet Circles" (single version)	Dick; Rothery; Trewavas; Kelly; Mosley	Clutching at Straws	4:24
13.	"That Time of the Night (The Short Straw)"	Dick; Rothery; Trewavas; Kelly; Mosley	Clutching at Straws	5:57
14.	"Sugar Mice"	Dick; Rothery; Trewavas; Kelly; Mosley	Clutching at Straws	5:45

Disc two
No.	Title	Writer(s)	Origin	Length
1.	"The Uninvited Guest"	Steve Hogarth; Rothery; Trewavas; Kelly; John Helmer	Seasons End	3:45
2.	"Easter"	Hogarth; Rothery; Trewavas; Kelly; Mosley	Seasons End	4:31
3.	"Hooks in You" (Meaty Mix)	Hogarth; Rothery; Trewavas; Kelly; Mosley; Helmer	Seasons End	3:53
4.	"The Space"	Hogarth; Rothery; Trewavas; Kelly	Seasons End	6:15
5.	"Cover My Eyes (Pain and Heaven)"	Hogarth; Rothery; Trewavas; Kelly; Mosley	Holidays in Eden	3:54
6.	"No One Can"	Hogarth; Rothery; Trewavas; Kelly; Mosley	Holidays in Eden	4:40
7.	"Dry Land"	Hogarth; Colin Woore	Holidays in Eden	4:42
8.	"Waiting to Happen"	Hogarth; Rothery; Trewavas; Kelly; Mosley	Holidays in Eden	4:55
9.	"The Great Escape" (album version)	Hogarth; Rothery; Trewavas; Kelly; Mosley; Helmer	Brave	6:28
10.	"Alone Again in the Lap of Luxury" (radio edit)	Hogarth; Rothery; Trewavas; Kelly; Mosley	Brave	4:29
11.	"Made Again"	Hogarth; Rothery; Trewavas; Kelly; Mosley; Helmer	Brave	5:03
12.	"King"	Hogarth; Rothery; Trewavas; Kelly; Mosley	Afraid of Sunlight	7:05
13.	"Afraid of Sunlight"	Hogarth; Rothery; Trewavas; Kelly; Helmer	Afraid of Sunlight	6:50
14.	"Beautiful" (radio edit)	Hogarth; Rothery; Trewavas; Kelly; Mosley	Afraid of Sunlight	4:23
15.	"Cannibal Surf Babe"	Hogarth; Rothery; Trewavas; Kelly; Mosley; Helmer	Afraid of Sunlight	5:17

Note

- Although it is not mentioned in the album credits, the versions of "Easter" and "The Uninvited Guest" presented here are single edits. "Waiting to Happen" is a few seconds shorter than the album version. "Cannibal Surf Babe" is presented without the musical bridge that appears at the end of the song on the album version.

== Personnel ==
Musicians

- Steve Rothery – guitars
- Mark Kelly – keyboards
- Pete Trewavas – bass
- Ian Mosley – drums, percussion (except disc one: tracks 1–5)
- Fish – vocals (disc one)
- Steve Hogarth – vocals and keyboards (disc two)
- Mick Pointer – drums, percussion (disc one: tracks 1, 3–5)
- John Marter – drums, percussion (disc one: track 2)

Technical

- Disc one: tracks 1–7 produced by Nick Tauber; tracks 8–14 produced by Chris Kimsey. Track 1 mixed by Simon Hanhart.
- Disc two: tracks 1–4 produced and mixed by Nick Davis and Marillion; tracks 5–8 produced by Christopher Neil, recorded and mixed by Rob Eaton; tracks 9–15 produced by Dave Meegan and Marillion. Tracks 10–11 engineered by Dave Meegan.

== Charts ==
Chart (1997)	Peak position
Dutch Albums (Album Top 100)	58
UK Albums (OCC)	88
