= Early Stages =

Early Stages (Official Bootleg Box Set 1982–1987)
- Cover art by Mark Wilkinson

Box set by Marillion
- Released: 17 November 2008
- Recorded: Various venues, 1982–1987
- Genre: Progressive rock, neo-prog, art rock
- Label: EMI
- Producer: Nick Tauber (30/12/82)

Marillion chronology
Happiness Is the Road (2008)	Early Stages (Official Bootleg Box Set 1982–1987) (2008)	Live from Loreley (2009)

Professional ratings
Review scores
Source	Rating
AllMusic	4/5 stars

Early Stages (Official Bootleg Box Set 1982–1987) is a box set containing live recordings of Marillion with their former singer Fish. The recordings were made by the BBC for radio broadcast, and are from five concerts performed by the band in the UK between 1982 and 1987. The packaging was designed by Mark Wilkinson, who had designed all Marillion covers of the 1980s and went on to work with Fish after his departure. The set was released to retail by EMI on 17 November 2008.

The set contains the following recordings:

- Live at the Mayfair, Glasgow 13 September 1982 (CD 1)
- Live at the Marquee, 30 December 1982 (CD 2 & 3)
- Live at the Reading Festival, 27 August 1983 (CD 4)
- Live at Hammersmith Odeon, 14 December 1984 (CD 5)
- Live at Wembley Arena, 5 November 1987 (CD 6)

The set was replaced in 2013 by a 2 disc set called Early Stages - The Highlights which features a selection of tracks from each concert, plus one new track, a version of "Market Square Heroes" recorded at the Fife Aid concert in 1988. This was the final song of Fish's final live performance with the band.

== Track listing ==
=== Disc 1 ===
Live at the Mayfair, Glasgow, 13 September 1982

1. "Garden Party" (Fish, Jelliman, Kelly, Minnett, Pointer, Rothery, Trewavas) – 8:19
2. "The Web" (Fish, Jelliman, Kelly, Minnett, Pointer, Rothery, Trewavas) – 10:29
3. "He Knows You Know" (Fish, Jelliman, Kelly, Minnett, Pointer, Rothery, Trewavas) – 5:22
4. "She Chameleon" (Fish, Kelly, Rothery, Trewavas) – 5:39
5. "Three Boats Down from the Candy" (Fish, Kelly, Minnett, Pointer, Rothery, Trewavas) – 5:19
6. "Market Square Heroes" (Fish, Kelly, Minnett, Pointer, Rothery, Trewavas) – 6:20
7. "Forgotten Sons" (Fish, Jelliman, Kelly, Minnett, Pointer, Rothery, Trewavas) – 10:24

=== Disc 2 ===
Live at the Marquee, Part 1, 30 December 1982

1. "Garden Party" (Fish, Jelliman, Kelly, Minnett, Pointer, Rothery, Trewavas) – 8:29
2. "Three Boats Down from the Candy" (Fish, Kelly, Minnett, Pointer, Rothery, Trewavas) – 6:49
3. "Grendel" (Fish, Jelliman, Kelly, Minnett, Pointer, Rothery, Trewavas) – 19:54
4. "Chelsea Monday" (Fish, Jelliman, Kelly, Minnett, Pointer, Rothery, Trewavas) – 9:21

=== Disc 3 ===
Live at the Marquee, Part 2, 30 December 1982

1. "He Knows You Know" (Fish, Jelliman, Kelly, Minnett, Pointer, Rothery, Trewavas) – 8:24
2. "The Web" (Fish, Jelliman, Kelly, Minnett, Pointer, Rothery, Trewavas) – 11:49
3. "Script for a Jester's Tear" (Fish, Kelly, Pointer, Rothery, Trewavas) – 10:20
4. "Forgotten Sons" (Fish, Jelliman, Kelly, Minnett, Pointer, Rothery, Trewavas) – 12:03
5. "Market Square Heroes" (Fish, Kelly, Minnett, Pointer, Rothery, Trewavas) – 7:39
6. "Margaret" (Fish, Kelly, Rothery, Trewavas) – 11:15

=== Disc 4 ===
Live at Reading Festival, 27 August 1983

1. "Grendel" (Fish, Jelliman, Kelly, Minnett, Pointer, Rothery, Trewavas) – 18:07
2. "Garden Party" (Fish, Jelliman, Kelly, Minnett, Pointer, Rothery, Trewavas) – 6:46
3. "Script for a Jester's Tear" (Fish, Kelly, Pointer, Rothery, Trewavas) – 9:00
4. "Assassing" (Fish, Kelly, Rothery, Trewavas) – 7:45
5. "Charting the Single" (Fish, Kelly, Pointer, Rothery, Trewavas) – 5:22
6. "Forgotten Sons" (Fish, Jelliman, Kelly, Minnett, Pointer, Rothery, Trewavas) – 11:41
7. "He Knows You Know" (Fish, Jelliman, Kelly, Minnett, Pointer, Rothery, Trewavas) – 5:42
8. "Market Square Heroes" (Fish, Kelly, Minnett, Pointer, Rothery, Trewavas) – 10:22 Medley including "Margaret", "The Jean Genie" and "The Web"

=== Disc 5 ===
Live at Hammersmith Odeon, 14 December 1984

1. "Assassing" (Fish, Kelly, Rothery, Trewavas) – 6:50
2. "Garden Party" (Fish, Jelliman, Kelly, Minnett, Pointer, Rothery, Trewavas) – 6:53
3. "Cinderella Search" (Fish, Kelly, Mosley, Rothery, Trewavas) – 6:16
4. "Punch and Judy" (Fish, Kelly, Mover, Rothery, Trewavas) – 3:30
5. "Jigsaw" (Fish, Kelly, Rothery, Trewavas) – 7:02
6. "Chelsea Monday" (Fish, Jelliman, Kelly, Minnett, Pointer, Rothery, Trewavas) – 8:13

[Misplaced Childhood Part One]

1. "Pseudo-silk Kimono" (Fish, Kelly, Mosley, Rothery, Trewavas) – 2:53
2. "Kayleigh" (Fish, Kelly, Mosley, Rothery, Trewavas) – 3:53
3. "Bitter Suite" (Fish, Kelly, Mosley, Rothery, Trewavas) – 6:01
4. "Heart of Lothian" (Fish, Kelly, Mosley, Rothery, Trewavas) – 4:24
1. "Incubus" (Fish, Kelly, Rothery, Trewavas) – 9:08
2. "Fugazi" (Fish, Kelly, Mosley, Rothery, Trewavas) – 10:32

=== Disc 6 ===
Live at Wembley Arena, 5 November 1987

1. "Slainte Mhath" (Fish, Kelly, Mosley, Rothery, Trewavas) – 5:03
2. "White Russian" (Fish, Kelly, Mosley, Rothery, Trewavas) – 6:01
3. "Incubus" (Fish, Kelly, Rothery, Trewavas) – 8:56
4. "Sugar Mice" (Fish, Kelly, Mosley, Rothery, Trewavas) – 7:03
5. "Fugazi" (Fish, Kelly, Mosley, Rothery, Trewavas) – 8:15
6. "Hotel Hobbies" (Fish, Kelly, Mosley, Rothery, Trewavas) – 4:07
7. "Warm Wet Circles" (Fish, Kelly, Mosley, Rothery, Trewavas) – 4:30
8. "That Time of the Night" (Fish, Kelly, Mosley, Rothery, Trewavas) – 5:53
9. "The Last Straw" (Fish, Kelly, Mosley, Rothery, Trewavas) – 6:13
10. "Kayleigh" (Fish, Kelly, Mosley, Rothery, Trewavas) – 4:28
11. "Lavender" (Fish, Kelly, Mosley, Rothery, Trewavas) – 2:24
12. "Bitter Suite" (Fish, Kelly, Mosley, Rothery, Trewavas) – 8:07
13. "Heart of Lothian" (Fish, Kelly, Mosley, Rothery, Trewavas) – 3:56

=== The Highlights - Disc 1 ===
Live at the Mayfair, Glasgow, 13 September 1982
1. "Garden Party" (Fish, Jelliman, Kelly, Minnett, Pointer, Rothery, Trewavas) – 8:19
2. "She Chameleon" (Fish, Kelly, Rothery, Trewavas) – 5:39
3. "Three Boats Down from the Candy" (Fish, Kelly, Minnett, Pointer, Rothery, Trewavas) – 5:19
Live at the Marquee, 30 December 1982
4. "Script for a Jester's Tear" (Fish, Kelly, Pointer, Rothery, Trewavas) – 10:20
5. "Chelsea Monday" (Fish, Jelliman, Kelly, Minnett, Pointer, Rothery, Trewavas) – 9:21
6. "Forgotten Sons" (Fish, Jelliman, Kelly, Minnett, Pointer, Rothery, Trewavas) – 12:03
Live at Reading Festival, 27 August 1983
7. "Grendel" (Fish, Jelliman, Kelly, Minnett, Pointer, Rothery, Trewavas) – 18:07
8. "Charting the Single" (Fish, Kelly, Pointer, Rothery, Trewavas) – 5:22
9. "He Knows You Know" (Fish, Jelliman, Kelly, Minnett, Pointer, Rothery, Trewavas) – 5:42

=== The Highlights - Disc 2 ===
Live at Hammersmith Odeon, 14 December 1984
1. "Assassing" (Fish, Kelly, Rothery, Trewavas) – 6:50
2. "Punch and Judy" (Fish, Kelly, Mover, Rothery, Trewavas) – 3:30
3. "Jigsaw" (Fish, Kelly, Rothery, Trewavas) – 7:02
4. "Chelsea Monday" (Fish, Jelliman, Kelly, Minnett, Pointer, Rothery, Trewavas) – 8:13
[Misplaced Childhood Part One]
5. "Pseudo-silk Kimono" (Fish, Kelly, Mosley, Rothery, Trewavas) – 2:53
6. "Kayleigh" (Fish, Kelly, Mosley, Rothery, Trewavas) – 3:53
7. "Bitter Suite" (Fish, Kelly, Mosley, Rothery, Trewavas) – 6:01
8. "Heart of Lothian" (Fish, Kelly, Mosley, Rothery, Trewavas) – 4:24

9. "Fugazi" (Fish, Kelly, Mosley, Rothery, Trewavas) – 10:32
Live at Wembley Arena, 5 November 1987
10. "Slainte Mhath" (Fish, Kelly, Mosley, Rothery, Trewavas) – 5:03
11. "Hotel Hobbies" (Fish, Kelly, Mosley, Rothery, Trewavas) – 4:07
12. "Warm Wet Circles" (Fish, Kelly, Mosley, Rothery, Trewavas) – 4:30
13. "That Time of the Night" (Fish, Kelly, Mosley, Rothery, Trewavas) – 5:53
14. "The Last Straw" (Fish, Kelly, Mosley, Rothery, Trewavas) – 6:13
Live at Fife Aid, St. Andrews, Scotland, 23 July 1988
15. "Market Square Heroes" (Fish, Kelly, Minnett, Pointer, Rothery, Trewavas) – 8:31 Medley including "My Generation" and "Let's Twist Again"

== Personnel ==
- Fish – vocals
- Steve Rothery – guitars
- Mark Kelly – keyboards
- Peter Trewavas – bass, backing vocals
- Mick Pointer – drums & percussion (discs 1, 2 & 3)
- John Marter – drums (disc 4)
- Andy Ward – percussion (disc 4)
- Ian Mosley – drums and percussion (discs 5 & 6)
- Cori Josias – backing vocals (disc 6)
