= The Thieving Magpie (album) =

1988 live album by Marillion

The Thieving Magpie (La Gazza Ladra)

Live album by Marillion
- Released: 28 November 1988
- Recorded: 1984, 1986, 1987
- Genre: Neo-prog
- Length: 112:18
- Labels: EMI (UK); Capitol Records (US)
- Producers: Marillion and Privet Hedge

Marillion chronology
| B'Sides Themselves (1988) | The Thieving Magpie (La Gazza Ladra) (1988) | Seasons End (1989) |

Singles from The Thieving Magpie (La Gazza Ladra)
- 1. "Freaks (live)" Released: 14 November 1988

Professional ratings
Review scores
| Source | Rating |
|---|---|
| AllMusic | 4/5 stars |

The Thieving Magpie (La Gazza Ladra) is a double live album by the British neo-prog band Marillion. It was named after the introductory piece of classical music the band used before coming on stage during the Clutching at Straws tour 1987–1988, the overture to Rossini's opera La gazza ladra, which translates as "The Thieving Magpie". The album was released shortly after singer Fish's departure from the band (and before Steve Hogarth's arrival) and was intended to document the "Fish years". It complements the band's first live album Real to Reel insofar as there are no overlaps. The Thieving Magpie is not a continuous live recording, but a compilation of tracks recorded at different times and places, with audible gaps between them and different moods on the individual tracks. However, the double vinyl version does include the first side of the UK number one concept album Misplaced Childhood (1985). The CD and cassette version includes the full album, as well as the track "Freaks" – originally the b-side to "Lavender", it was used as the lead single for The Thieving Magpie peaking at no. 18 in the UK.

The album was produced by Christopher "Privet" Hedge, who had been Marillion's sound engineer from early on in their career. While ostensibly a live recording, some vocals were overdubbed in the studio - the track "Freaks" on the album originated from a concert in Mannheim which was also broadcast on FM and is hence available on bootlegs, and there are significant differences in parts of the vocal.

== Cover art ==
The cover was designed by regular Marillion contributor Mark Wilkinson, who went on to work for Fish. The front part contains photorealistic airbrushed renderings of the band members. The back cover features characters found on the covers of the previous albums, i.e. "The Jester" (Script for a Jester's Tear), "The Boy" (Misplaced Childhood), and "Torch" (Clutching at Straws). The inside of the vinyl gatefold sleeve consists of a rather blurred photograph of the band on stage, circa 1986.

== Release history ==
Originally, the album was released on double vinyl and the above-mentioned extended double CD/cassette set. In 2005, EMI Japan released a "vinyl replica" edition, i.e. a CD in a miniaturised version of the original vinyl packaging. The track listing, however, is the same as on the original 2CD version. On 22 June 2009, EMI released a digitally remastered version (along with Recital of the Script and Live From Loreley).

== Track listing ==
=== Double LP version ===
Side one
| No. | Title | Recording venue and date | Length |
|---|---|---|---|
| 1. | "Intro: La Gazza Ladra" | | 2:45 |
| 2. | "Slàinte Mhath" | Edinburgh Playhouse, 17/18/19 December 1987 | 4:49 |
| 3. | "He Knows You Know" | Sheffield City Hall, 6 March 1984 | 5:12 |
| 4. | "Chelsea Monday" | De Montfort Hall, 5 March 1984 | 8:00 |

Side two (Misplaced Childhood Part 1 - Hammersmith Odeon, 9/10 January 1986)
| No. | Title | Length |
|---|---|---|
| 1. | "Pseudo Silk Kimono" | 2:19 |
| 2. | "Kayleigh" | 3:52 |
| 3. | "Lavender" | 2:27 |
| 4. | "Bitter Suite" | 7:38 |
| 5. | "Heart of Lothian" | 5:12 |

Side three
| No. | Title | Recording venue and date | Length |
|---|---|---|---|
| 1. | "Jigsaw" | Sheffield City Hall, 6 March 1984 | 6:24 |
| 2. | "Punch & Judy" | Sheffield City Hall, 6 March 1984 | 3:23 |
| 3. | "Sugar Mice" | Edinburgh Playhouse, 17/18/19 December 1987 | 6:03 |
| 4. | "Fugazi" | Sheffield City Hall, 6 March 1984 | 8:39 |

Side four
| No. | Title | Recording venue and date | Length |
|---|---|---|---|
| 1. | "Script for a Jester's Tear" | Sheffield City Hall, 6 March 1984 | 8:45 |
| 2. | "Incommunicado" | Edinburgh Playhouse, 17/18/19 December 1987 | 5:23 |
| 3. | "White Russian" | Edinburgh Playhouse, 17/18/19 December 1987 | 6:14 |

=== Double CD version ===
Disc one
| No. | Title | Recording venue and date | Length |
|---|---|---|---|
| 1. | "Intro: La Gazza Ladra" | | 2:45 |
| 2. | "Slàinte Mhath" | Edinburgh Playhouse, 17/18/19 December 1987 | 4:49 |
| 3. | "He Knows You Know" | Sheffield City Hall, 6 March 1984 | 5:12 |
| 4. | "Chelsea Monday" | De Montfort Hall, 5 March 1984 | 8:00 |
| 5. | "Freaks" | Maimarktgelände, 21 June 1986 | 4:06 |
| 6. | "Jigsaw" | Sheffield City Hall, 6 March 1984 | 6:24 |
| 7. | "Punch & Judy" | Sheffield City Hall, 6 March 1984 | 3:23 |
| 8. | "Sugar Mice" | Edinburgh Playhouse, 17/18/19 December 1987 | 6:03 |
| 9. | "Fugazi" | Sheffield City Hall, 6 March 1984 | 8:39 |
| 10. | "Script for a Jester's Tear" | Sheffield City Hall, 6 March 1984 | 8:45 |
| 11. | "Incommunicado" | Edinburgh Playhouse, 17/18/19 December 1987 | 5:23 |
| 12. | "White Russian" | Edinburgh Playhouse, 17/18/19 December 1987 | 6:14 |

Disc two (Misplaced Childhood, Hammersmith Odeon 9/10 January 1986)
| No. | Title | Length |
|---|---|---|
| 1. | "Pseudo Silk Kimono" | 2:19 |
| 2. | "Kayleigh" | 3:52 |
| 3. | "Lavender" | 2:27 |
| 4. | "Bitter Suite" | 7:38 |
| 5. | "Heart of Lothian" | 5:12 |
| 6. | "Waterhole (Expresso Bongo)" | 2:16 |
| 7. | "Lords of the Backstage" | 6:07 |
| 8. | "Blind Curve" | 5:34 |
| 9. | "Childhoods End?" | 2:48 |
| 10. | "White Feather" | 4:22 |

== Personnel ==
- Fish - vocals
- Steve Rothery - guitar
- Mark Kelly - keyboards
- Pete Trewavas - bass, backing vocals
- Ian Mosley - drums

== Charts ==
=== Weekly charts ===
| Chart (1988–1989) | Peak position |
|---|---|
| Dutch Albums (Album Top 100) | 46 |
| German Albums (Offizielle Top 100) | 19 |
| Swedish Albums (Sverigetopplistan) | 33 |
| Swiss Albums (Schweizer Hitparade) | 18 |
| UK Albums (Official Charts) | 25 |

=== Year-end charts ===
| Chart (1989) | Position |
|---|---|
| German Albums (Offizielle Top 100) | 98 |

== Certifications ==
| Region | Certification | Certified units/sales |
|---|---|---|
| United Kingdom (BPI) | Gold | 100,000^{^} |
^{^} Shipments figures based on certification alone.
