= Front Row =

Front Row may refer to:

- Front Row (software), media center software for Apple's Mac computers
- Front Row (radio programme), a British arts programme broadcast on BBC Radio 4
- Front Row (TV program), a Philippine documentary television program broadcast on GMA Network
- Front Row Channel, an international digital channel
- Front Row (album), a 1982 album by David Meece
- "Front Row", an Alanis Morissette song from her 1998 album Supposed Former Infatuation Junkie
- The three-player formation at the front of a rugby scrum

== See also ==
- Front Row Center, a TV series aired on the DuMont Television Network from 1949 to 1950
- Front Row Club Issue 1, a 1998 live album by British rock group Marillion
- Front Row Motorsports, a team that competes on NASCAR Sprint Cup circuit
- The Front Row With Anupama Chopra, Indian weekly film review TV show, hosted by Anupama Chopra on Star World
