= Michael Pointer =

Michael Pointer may refer to:

- Michael R. Pointer, a scientist who approximated the gamut of real surface colours
- Mick Pointer, English drummer
- Michael Pointer (character), a fictional character appearing in Marvel Comics
