= Live from Loreley =

- Cover art by Mark Wilkinson

Live album by Marillion
- Released: 22 June 2009
- Recorded: 18 July 1987
- Venue: Lorelei Freilichtbühne Loreley (Germany)
- Genre: Neo-prog
- Length: 118:13 (2009 CD version)
- Label: EMI

Marillion chronology
Early Stages (2008)	Live from Loreley (2009)	Recital of the Script (2009)

Live from Loreley is a live album by the British neo-prog band Marillion, recorded at a concert at the Freilichtbühne Loreley (Open-Air Stage) Loreley, St. Goarshausen, Germany on 18 July 1987. The recording, made during the first leg of the 1987 Clutching at Straws tour, documents the band at the peak of their commercial success in the 1980s when they had original frontman Fish on vocals. The show was attended by an audience of 20,000; support acts were Magnum, The Cult (cancelled), and It Bites. It comprises songs from the four studio albums they released up to that point, i.e. Script for a Jester's Tear (1983), Fugazi (1984), Misplaced Childhood (1985), and Clutching at Straws (1987). The non-album debut single "Market Square Heroes" is also included.

The cover uses the original 1987 concert poster designed by Fish-era Marillion (and later Fish solo) graphic artist Mark Wilkinson. It shows the central character from the cover of the then-current single "Incommunicado" above a drawing of the characteristic marquee above the venue's stage.

== Release history ==
A video recording of this concert had first been released on VHS tape in November 1987, and re-released in 1995, then packaged together with an audio CD (one disc) including the soundtrack of the VHS tape except "Incubus". This 'Sound & Vision' video recording, since out of print, was re-issued on DVD in August 2004. On 22 June 2009, EMI released the recording a fourth time, this time as a digitally remastered double audio CD including four tracks that had been omitted from the previous video and audio versions ("White Russian", "Fugazi", "Garden Party" and "Market Square Heroes"). The version of "White Russian" found on the 2009 issue had previously been released on the B-side "Warm Wet Circles" (1987).

On the same day, EMI released Recital of the Script, another first-time audio version of a 1980s live video. Although neither Marillion nor ex-singer Fish were involved in the decision to re-release this material, they officially approved it and Fish has written liner notes for both. Fish commented that "as contractually we have no control over the material [we] decided it would be more advisable to help out rather than relinquish total responsibility. (...) I understand there will be accusations of "scraping the barrel" directed at EMI, and perhaps there is some justification, but (...) our choice was to walk away and let Amazon and the like benefit or get involved and at least try and get some return above the pennies we get as royalties as a band under our old contract."

== Track listing (2009 double audio CD) ==
=== Disc 1 ===
1. "Slàinte Mhath" (from Clutching at Straws, 1987) – 5:14
2. "Assassing" (from Fugazi, 1984) – 7:07
3. "Script for a Jester's Tear" (from Script for a Jester's Tear, 1983) – 9:45
4. "White Russian" (from Clutching at Straws, 1987) – 6:48
5. "Incubus" (from Fugazi, 1984) – 9:21
6. "Sugar Mice" (from Clutching at Straws, 1987) – 6:34
7. "Fugazi" (from Fugazi, 1984) – 8:23

=== Disc 2 ===
1. "Hotel Hobbies" (from Clutching at Straws, 1987) – 4:15
2. "Warm Wet Circles" (from Clutching at Straws, 1987) – 4:19
3. "That Time of the Night (The Short Straw)" (from Clutching at Straws, 1987) – 6:03
4. "Kayleigh" (from Misplaced Childhood, 1985) – 4:22
5. "Lavender" (from Misplaced Childhood, 1985) – 2:38
6. "Bitter Suite (Medley)" (from Misplaced Childhood, 1985) – 7:39
7. "Heart of Lothian" (from Misplaced Childhood, 1985) – 4:24
8. "The Last Straw" (from Clutching at Straws, 1987) – 6:23
9. "Incommunicado" (from Clutching at Straws, 1987) – 6:13
10. "Garden Party" (from Script for a Jester's Tear, 1983) – 7:13
11. "Market Square Heroes" (non-album single, 1982) – 11:32

== Track listing (earlier versions) ==
1987 VHS tape, 1995 VHS tape+audio CD package, 2004 DVD

1. "Slàinte Mhath"
2. "Assassing"
3. "Script for a Jester's Tear"
4. "Incubus" (not on the 1995 audio CD)
5. "Sugar Mice"
6. "Hotel Hobbies"
7. "Warm Wet Circles"
8. "That Time of the Night"
9. "Kayleigh"
10. "Lavender"
11. "Bitter Suite"
12. "Heart of Lothian"
13. "The Last Straw"
14. "Incommunicado"

== Personnel ==
- Fish – vocals
- Steve Rothery – guitars
- Mark Kelly – keyboards
- Pete Trewavas – bass, backing vocals
- Ian Mosley – drums
- Cori Josias – backing vocals
