= Recital of the Script =

- Cover art by Mark Wilkinson

Live album by Marillion
- Released: 22 June 2009
- Recorded: 18 April 1983
- Venue: Hammersmith Odeon (London)
- Genre: Progressive rock, neo-prog
- Length: 97:27 (2009 CD version)
- Label: EMI

Marillion chronology
Live from Loreley (2009)	Recital of the Script (2009)	Less Is More (2009)

Recital of the Script is a live album by Marillion, recorded at a concert at the Hammersmith Odeon (as it was called then), London on 18 April 1983. The recording was made on the final date of the tour promoting their 1983 debut album Script for a Jester's Tear. Featuring former members Fish on vocals and Mick Pointer on drums, it comprises songs from that album as well as all tracks of the 1982 debut EP "Market Square Heroes" and the b-side of "He Knows You Know" (1983).

== Release history ==
A video recording of this concert, entitled Recital of the Script and containing only six tracks, had first been released on VHS tape in October 1983. In April 1984, this was supplemented by The Video E.P. which contained another two tracks, "The Web" and the 19-minute-plus "Grendel" (see track listing below for details). In July 2003, EMI released a DVD under the title Recital of the Script combining the material of the 1983 and 1984 VHS tapes. Additionally, this DVD contained another two tracks, footage and an interview with Fish recorded at the Marquee Club (then in Wardour Street) in December 1982.

On 22 June 2009, EMI released the full sound recording of the 1983 Hammersmith Odeon gig on a double CD set. This version includes two tracks not found on the VHS or DVD: "Charting the Single" (b-side to "He Knows You Know"), previously released as a b-side to the "Garden Party" 12", and "Three Boats Down from the Candy" (b-side to "Market Square Heroes"), which was not previously released.

On the same day, EMI released Live from Loreley, another first-time audio version of a 1980s live video. Although neither Marillion nor ex-singer Fish were involved in the decision to re-release this material, they officially approved it and Fish has written liner notes for both. Fish commented that "as contractually we have no control over the material [we] decided it would be more advisable to help out rather than relinquish total responsibility. (...) I understand there will be accusations of "scraping the barrel" directed at EMI, and perhaps there is some justification, but (...) our choice was to walk away and let Amazon and the like benefit or get involved and at least try and get some return above the pennies we get as royalties as a band under our old contract."

== Track listing (2009 double audio CD) ==
=== Disc one ===
1. "Script for a Jester's Tear" (from Script for a Jester's Tear, 1983) – 8:46
2. "Garden Party" (from Script for a Jester's Tear, 1983) – 7:15
3. "Three Boats Down from the Candy" (from "Market Square Heroes", 1982) – 7:44
4. "The Web" (from Script for a Jester's Tear, 1983) – 12:00
5. "Charting the Single" (from "He Knows You Know", 1982) – 6:18
6. "Chelsea Monday" (from Script for a Jester's Tear, 1983) – 7:48

=== Disc two ===
1. "He Knows You Know" (from Script for a Jester's Tear, 1983) – 6:17
2. "Forgotten Sons" (from Script for a Jester's Tear, 1983) – 14:17
3. "Market Square Heroes" (from "Market Square Heroes", 1982) – 8:05
4. "Grendel" (from "Market Square Heroes", 1982) – 18:54

== Track listing (earlier versions) ==
1983 VHS tape Recital of the Script (*), 1984 VHS tape The Video E.P. (**), 2003 DVD

1. "Script for a Jester's Tear" (from Script for a Jester's Tear, 1983) (*)
2. "Garden Party" (from Script for a Jester's Tear, 1983) (*)
3. "The Web" (from Script for a Jester's Tear, 1983) (**)
4. "Chelsea Monday" (from Script for a Jester's Tear, 1983) (*)
5. "He Knows You Know" (from Script for a Jester's Tear, 1983) (*)
6. "Forgotten Sons" (from Script for a Jester's Tear, 1983) (*)
7. "Market Square Heroes" (from "Market Square Heroes", 1982) (*)
8. "Grendel" (from "Market Square Heroes", 1982) (**)

=== Bonus tracks on the 2003 DVD ===
11. "He Knows You Know"
12. "Backstage"
13. "Market Square Heroes (Excerpt)"
14. "Fish Interview"

== Personnel ==
- Fish – vocals
- Steve Rothery – guitars
- Mark Kelly – keyboards
- Pete Trewavas – bass, backing vocals
- Mick Pointer – drums
