= Front Row Club Issue 1 =

Live album by Marillion

Ludwigshalle, Dieburg, Germany. 9 November 1998

Live album by Marillion
- Released: January 17, 2002
- Recorded: November 9, 1998 at Ludwigshalle, Dieburg, Germany
- Label: Racket Records
- Producer: Marillion

Front Row Club Issue 1 is a live Marillion CD recorded at Ludwigshalle, Dieburg, Germany, November 9, 1998, during the Radiation Tour. It is the first release in the Front Row Club Releases series.

== Track list ==
Disc 1

1. "A Few Words for the Dead" – 8:18
2. "Under the Sun" – 4:06
3. "Man of a Thousand Faces" – 4:15
4. "Mad" – 8:10
5. "Three Minute Boy" – 6:35
6. "80 Days" – 5:49
7. "Splintering Heart" – 6:55
8. "These Chains" – 4:56
9. "The Answering Machine" – 3:45
10. "Cannibal Surf Babe" – 5:54
11. "Gazpacho" – 5:05

Disc 2

1. "Cathedral Wall" – 6:31
2. "This Strange Engine" – 23:12
3. "Memory of Water (Big Beat Version)" – 8:01
4. "King" – 7:20
