= Market Square Heroes =

1982 single by Marillion

Single by Marillion
- B-side: "Three Boats Down from the Candy" "Grendel" (12")
- Released: 25 October 1982
- Recorded: Park Gate Studios, Battle, East Sussex, September/October 1982
- Length: 4:20
- Label: EMI
- Producer: Dave Hitchcock

Marillion singles chronology
"Market Square Heroes" (1982)	"He Knows You Know" (1983)

Audio sample
- Market Square Heroes: file; help

"Market Square Heroes" is the debut single by the British neo-prog band Marillion, released in October 1982 with "Three Boats Down from the Candy" as the B-side. The 12-inch single included an additional track, the 17:15-minute-long "Grendel".

== Themes ==
The A-side is an anthemic rock song whose lyric vaguely describes the rise of civil unrest under some charismatic leader in the face of increasing unemployment; the original title was "UB 2,000,001". According to Marillion's singer and lyricist Fish, the "market square hero" is a "would-be revolutionary with all the necessary charisma and presence of a leader without direction or goals, just a sense of frustration and anger". The track was the band's "first attempt at deliberately writing a hit record and a 'simple' rock song to juxtapose against our meandering but dynamic 'epics'."

Members of the band have attributed the inspiration behind the main character in the song lyrics to a person they knew in Aylesbury who went by the nickname of 'Brick'. In a 2009 interview, Mark Kelly stated: "I don't know whether Brick was a leftie, a militant or a skinhead but he was the inspiration for the character singing, 'I'm a Market Square Hero'". Fish made reference to this theme and introduced Brick as a "leftie hero" before he performed the song with his former Marillion bandmates in Aylesbury at the 'Hobble on the Cobbles' concert in 2007. Brick died in 2011.

=== B-sides ===
Musically, "Three Boats Down from the Candy" (the first song co-written by keyboardist Mark Kelly) and "Grendel" are more typical of the progressive rock style. "Grendel" is a long and complex composition which has drawn frequent (mostly unfavourable) comparisons with "Supper's Ready" by Genesis. As Fish himself admitted later:

We were concerned about the similarity to the lengthy composition by Genesis called 'Supper's Ready' which also meandered and burst into sections, the end one in particular, which would add conviction to the many critics' opinions that Marillion were more than influenced by Genesis.

Inspired by the John Gardner novel Grendel (1971), the lyric looks at the Beowulf myth from the perspective of the monster. Until 2012, neither Marillion nor Fish had ever played the track live after 1983. In spite (or possibly because) of this, it has developed into a cult favourite among die-hard fans; it is not uncommon to hear someone in the audience yell "Grendel!" at Marillion's or Fish's concerts even in the late 2000s.

Having categorically refused to play "Grendel" again for almost 30 years, Fish did so at a fan club convention held on 20 October 2012 in Leamington Spa. He performed it on the second day of the convention as well, 21 October, as an encore.

== Production ==
The record was produced by Dave Hitchcock, who had also produced the Genesis album Foxtrot with "Supper's Ready" on it. Hitchcock was also contracted to produce Marillion's upcoming debut album, but was heavily injured in a car accident when he drove home in a state of physical exhaustion after finishing work on the single. EMI used this occasion to convince the band to replace him with Nick Tauber, a more "modern" producer best known for his work with Toyah.

=== Cover art ===
The cover art was designed by Mark Wilkinson, who went on to create all Marillion artwork until 1988 and most of Fish's solo artwork after that. The cover introduced two distinctive visual elements that would identify the band in the years to come: the figure of the "Jester" and the logo, designed by Jo Mirowski.

=== Variations ===
The radio edit replaces the line "I am your Antichrist" with "I am your battle priest".

== Reception ==
The single did not enter the upper reaches of the UK singles charts, peaking at no. 60; however, sales remained stable for some time due to people backtracking on the strength of later, more successful releases. The song came fourth in Kerrang! magazine's Singles of the Year 1982.

== Subsequent releases ==
A limited edition (3,000 copies) picture disk of the 12" for "Market Square Heroes" was released by EMI at the start of their picture disc campaign in March 1983. None of the tracks on this release were included on Marillion's debut album Script for a Jester's Tear, which appeared in early 1983. Re-recorded versions of "Market Square Heroes" and "Three Boats Down from the Candy" with the band's short-termed drummer John Marter would form the B-side to the 1984 single "Punch and Judy". These re-recorded versions would later be included on the 1988 compilation album B'Sides Themselves, along with "Grendel"; "Market Square Heroes" is also on the 1997 compilation The Best of Both Worlds.

The original single versions of "Market Square Heroes" and "Three Boats Down from the Candy" would eventually become available on CD in 1997, when EMI released them on the bonus CD of the remastered Script for a Jester's Tear album. A CD replica of the single was also part of a collectors box-set released in July 2000 which contained Marillion's first twelve singles, and the subsequent facsimile of the collectors box-set, The Singles '82-'88.

=== Live versions ===
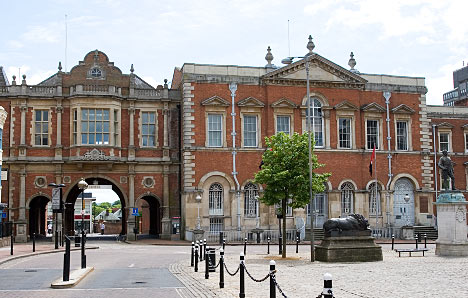
Aylesbury Market Square, the place that inspired the lyrics for "Market Square Heroes" and the scene of a one-off reunion performance of the song by Fish and Marillion in 2007.

The first time that a version of "Market Square Heroes" would become available on an album was on the 1984 live album Real to Reel, although a live version of "Three Boats Down from the Candy", recorded at the 1982 Reading Festival, was included on the "Reading Rock" festival album.

All three tracks also appear on the albums Early Stages (2008) and Recital of the Script (2009), and "Market Square Heroes" is on Live from Loreley (2009).

On 26 August 2007, Fish performed "Market Square Heroes" at the Hobble on the Cobbles festival in the market square of Aylesbury, the original "setting" of the song in the town where Marillion was formed. The other members of classic line-up of the band joined Fish on stage for this song. This surprise one-off reunion was the first occasion the 1984–88 line-up has shared one stage since the split in 1988.

== Track listing ==
=== 7" version ===
==== Side A ====
1. "Market Square Heroes" – 4:20

==== Side B ====
1. "Three Boats Down from the Candy" – 4:32

=== 12" version ===
==== Side A ====
1. "Market Square Heroes" – 4:20
2. "Three Boats Down from the Candy" – 4:32

==== Side B ====
1. "Grendel" – 17:15

== Personnel ==
- Fish – vocals
- Steve Rothery – guitars
- Mark Kelly – keyboards
- Pete Trewavas – bass
- Mick Pointer – drums
- Dave Hitchcock – producer
- Mark Freegard – mixing engineer at Wessex Studios
