= Unplugged at the Walls =

Unplugged at The Walls

Live album by Marillion
- Released: March 1999
- Recorded: 25–26 June 1998 at The Walls Restaurant, Oswestry, UK
- Genre: Acoustic rock
- Label: Racket Records
- Producer: Marillion

Unplugged at The Walls is an album by British rock band Marillion released in 1999. It was recorded in a small restaurant in Oswestry, near where they were mixing Radiation, on 25 and 26 June 1998 as a strictly acoustic set. Lead vocalist Steve Hogarth is reported to claim "We offered to play a gig in there for a free meal and some beers."

As soon as the fans found out they were going to perform in the restaurant, everyone wanted to come and see them. They eventually had to sell some tickets, and those were sold out in less than a day or so. Fans from all around the world found their way to the small town of Oswestry to hear the band perform, and the response was so great that the band also figured they had to tape the show. The band rewrote much of their performed material for the gig and debuted two songs from Radiation. They also performed their version of Abraham, Martin And John which appeared later on Marillion Christmas 1999 fan-club only release in a studio version. Some of the arrangements would later be used again on live recordings such as A Piss-Up in a Brewery and Mirrors.

At first the band didn't feel that the quality of the show warranted a CD of their own. Kelly had to re-record his piano parts for the album. On the night he used the restaurants piano, and the microphone was right next to Ian Mosleys drums and more noises of the room was spilling into the piano mikes.

Unplugged at The Walls was released on the band's own label, Racket Records. In 2018, earMUSIC reissued the album to retail as a limited edition (part of the 10 Live Albums campaign).

The cover of Radiohead's Fake Plastic Trees was also released on the These Chains CD single and the Japanese edition of Radiation, which also includes The Space... from this recording.

== Track listing ==
CD 1

1. "Beautiful" - 4:51
2. "Beyond You" - 5:58
3. "Afraid of Sunrise" - 4:13
4. "Runaway" - 6:36
5. "Now She'll Never Know" - 5:18
6. "Alone Again in the Lap of Luxury" - 3:52
7. "The Space" - 4:09
8. "Fake Plastic Trees" (Radiohead cover) - 5:09
9. "Holloway Girl" - 4:13
10. "King" - 6:32

CD 2

1. "The Answering Machine" - 4:29
2. "Gazpacho" - 5:38
3. "Cannibal Surf Babe" - 7:11
4. "Blackbird" (The Beatles cover) - 2:54
5. "Abraham, Martin and John" (Dick Holler cover) - 8:09
6. "Hooks In You" - 3:48
7. "Eighty Days" - 4:17

== Personnel ==
- Steve Hogarth - vocals, percussion
- Steve Rothery - acoustic guitar, bass guitar on "Now She'll Never Know", electric guitar on "Abraham, Martin and John"
- Mark Kelly - piano, Hammond organ
- Pete Trewavas - acoustic bass guitar, acoustic guitar on "Blackbird" and "Now She'll Never Know"
- Ian Mosley - drums
