= Fish (singer) =

Scottish singer

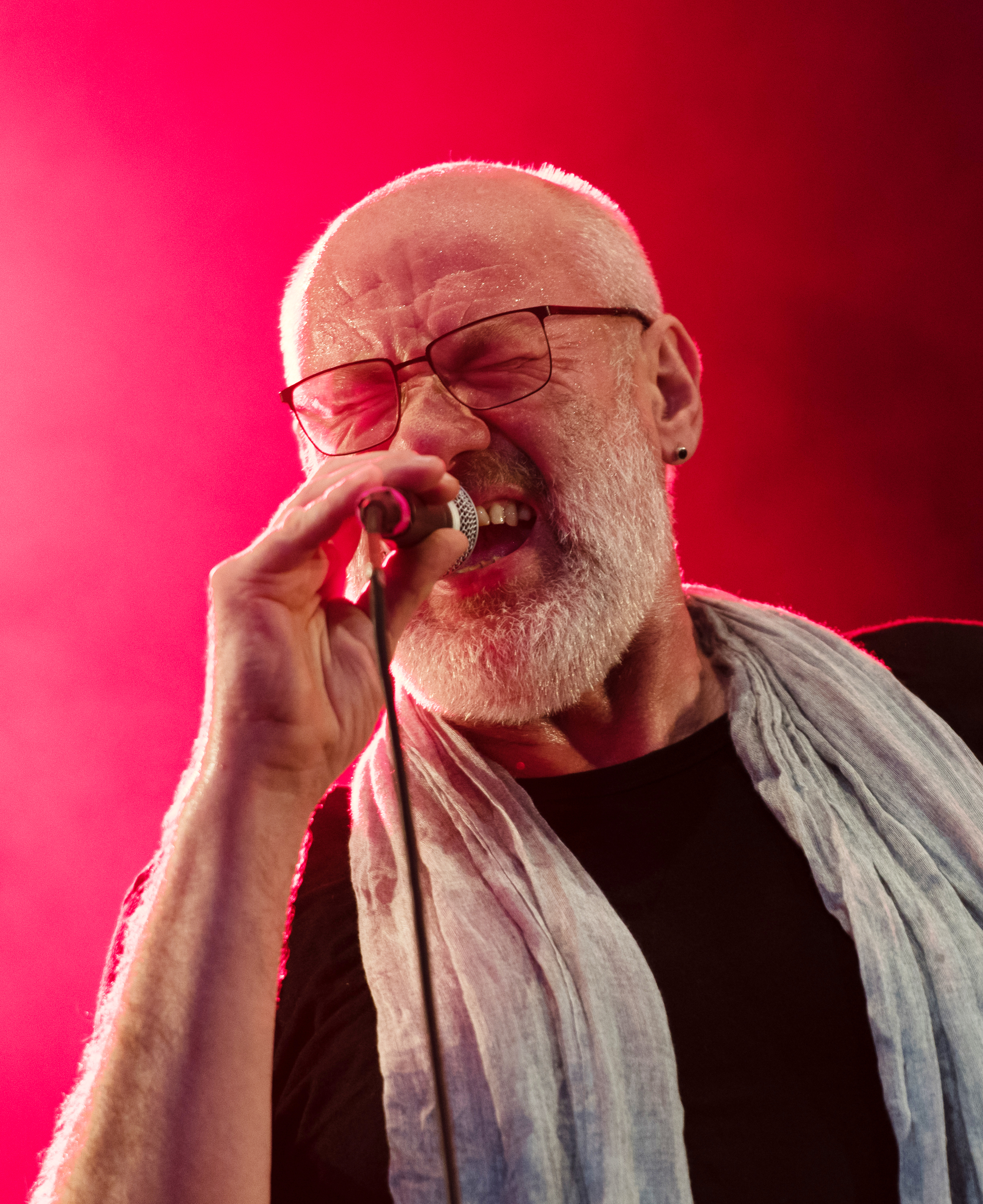
- Fish performing in Wacken, Germany, in 2018

Background information
- Born: Derek William Dick; 25 April 1958 (age 68); Edinburgh, Scotland
- Origin: Dalkeith, Midlothian, Scotland
- Genres: Rock; neo-prog; art rock; pop
- Occupations: Singer, songwriter, actor
- Years active: 1981–2025
- Labels: Chocolate Frog, EMI, Polydor, Roadrunner, Voiceprint, Dick Bros., Snapper, Lightyear
- Formerly of: Marillion
- Website: fishmusic.scot

Derek William Dick (born 25 April 1958), better known by his stage name Fish, is a retired Scottish singer, songwriter and occasional actor. He was the lead singer and lyricist of the neo-prog band Marillion from 1981 until 1988. He released 11 UK Top 40 singles with the band, including the Top 10 singles "Kayleigh", "Lavender" and "Incommunicado", and five Top 10 albums, including a number one with Misplaced Childhood. In his solo career, Fish explored contemporary pop and traditional folk, and released a further five Top 40 singles and a Top 10 album.

Fish's voice has been described as both "distinct" and a "conflation of Roger Daltrey and Peter Gabriel", while his lyrics have been described as "poetic prose". In 2004, Classic Rock ranked Fish at number 49 on its list of "The 100 Greatest Frontmen", describing his "theatrical delivery" as "a major factor in Marillion's spectacular rise, and he masterminded some uniquely ornate lyrical concepts." In 2009, Fish was voted at number 37 in a poll of the greatest voices in rock music by Planet Rock listeners.

In 2020, Fish released his final studio album Weltschmerz (German for "world-weariness"), to critical acclaim and commercial success. Fish toured Weltschmerz and celebrated the 30th anniversary of A Vigil in a Wilderness of Mirrors as part of the Vigil's End tour in 2021. Fish retired from music following a farewell tour completed in March 2025.

== Early life ==
Derek William Dick was born on 25 April 1958 in Edinburgh, Scotland, and grew up in Dalkeith. The son of Robert and Isabella, Fish was educated at King's Park primary school and then Dalkeith High School. He was inspired by the music of many of the rock artists of the late 1960s and early 1970s, including Genesis, Pink Floyd, the Moody Blues, the Kinks, T. Rex, David Bowie, Argent, and the Sensational Alex Harvey Band (Fish would later pay tribute to these early influences on his covers album Songs from the Mirror). Fish has also cited Canadian singer-songwriter Joni Mitchell as "one of the biggest influences on me because of her approach to lyrics". The first band he saw live was Yes at Usher Hall, Edinburgh, in 1974. As well as his love for music, he was also a voracious reader, and his literary inspirations included Jack Kerouac, Truman Capote, Robert Burns and Dylan Thomas (all of whom would later be depicted on the sleeve of Marillion's Clutching at Straws).

Fish worked as a petrol pump attendant, gardener, and from 1977 until 1980 worked in forestry at the Bowhill Estate in Selkirk. While living in Fochabers, Moray he adopted the nickname of Fish, which originated from a landlady who lamented the amount of time he spent in the bath. Fish has been quoted: "With a real name of Derek William Dick, it became very necessary to find a nickname as quickly as possible."

He first performed as a singer in 1980 at the Golden Lion pub in Galashiels. He moved to Church Laneham, Nottinghamshire, in mid-1980 following a successful audition for the Stone Dome Band, and then to Aylesbury at the start of 1981 in the process of joining Marillion.

== Marillion ==
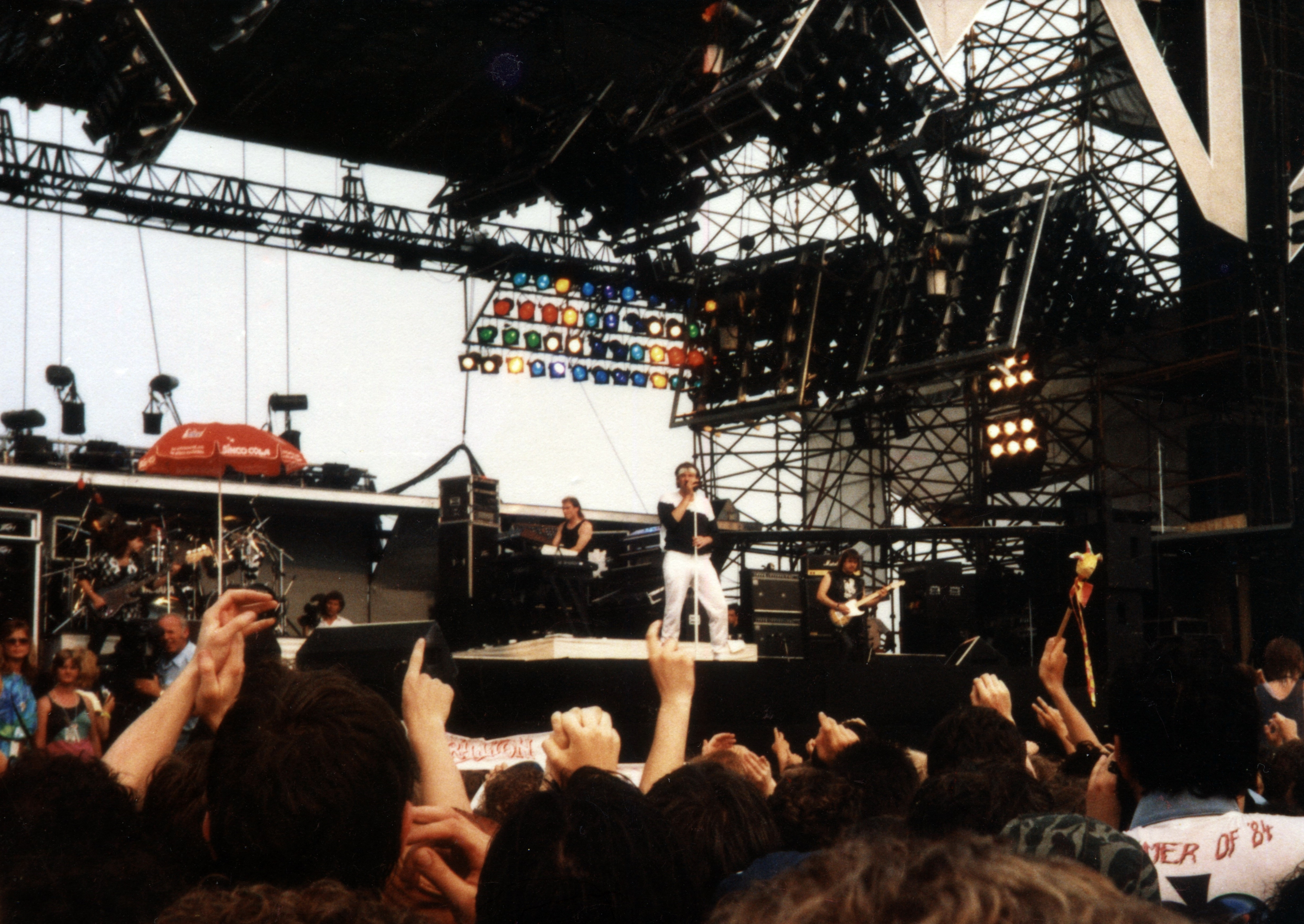
Fish with Marillion opening for Queen (Maimarktgelände Mannheim, Germany, 21 June 1986)

Fish joined Marillion in 1981. The band gained popularity over the next couple of years, leading to the release of their top-ten debut album Script for a Jester's Tear in 1983. They achieved further chart success in the UK, attaining top-ten hit singles in 1985 with "Kayleigh" and "Lavender", and again in 1987 with "Incommunicado". In 1988, due to the stress of touring and the detrimental effect it was having on his health, as well as having a falling out with bandmate Steve Rothery, Fish left Marillion to pursue a solo career. Lyrics from "Kayleigh" were etched into paving stones in Market Square in Galashiels in 2012. The lines "stilettoes in the snow", and "moon-washed college halls" were inspired by Fish's girlfriend of the time, who was at the Scottish College of Textiles in Galashiels in the 1980s.

== Solo career ==
Fish's debut solo album Vigil in a Wilderness of Mirrors was released in January 1990. Although the recordings for the album finished in June 1989, EMI Records decided to delay the release until 1990, to avoid collision with Marillion's album Seasons End, released in September 1989. Keyboardist Mickey Simmonds who had played with Mike Oldfield, co-wrote the songs on the album, and would continue to play with Fish on the tour. Also guitarist Janick Gers co-wrote the track "View From the Hill". Several well known musicians contributed to the album, including former Dire Straits guitarist Hal Lindes, who played guitar on most tracks and also contributed to the writing of three of the album's songs. Frank Usher, a Fish companion from pre-Marillion times, also contributed. Drums were played by Mark Brzezicki (Big Country) and John Keeble (Spandau Ballet), John Giblin contributed bass and Luís Jardim contributed additional percussion. Backing vocals came from Tessa Niles, who had appeared on Clutching at Straws.

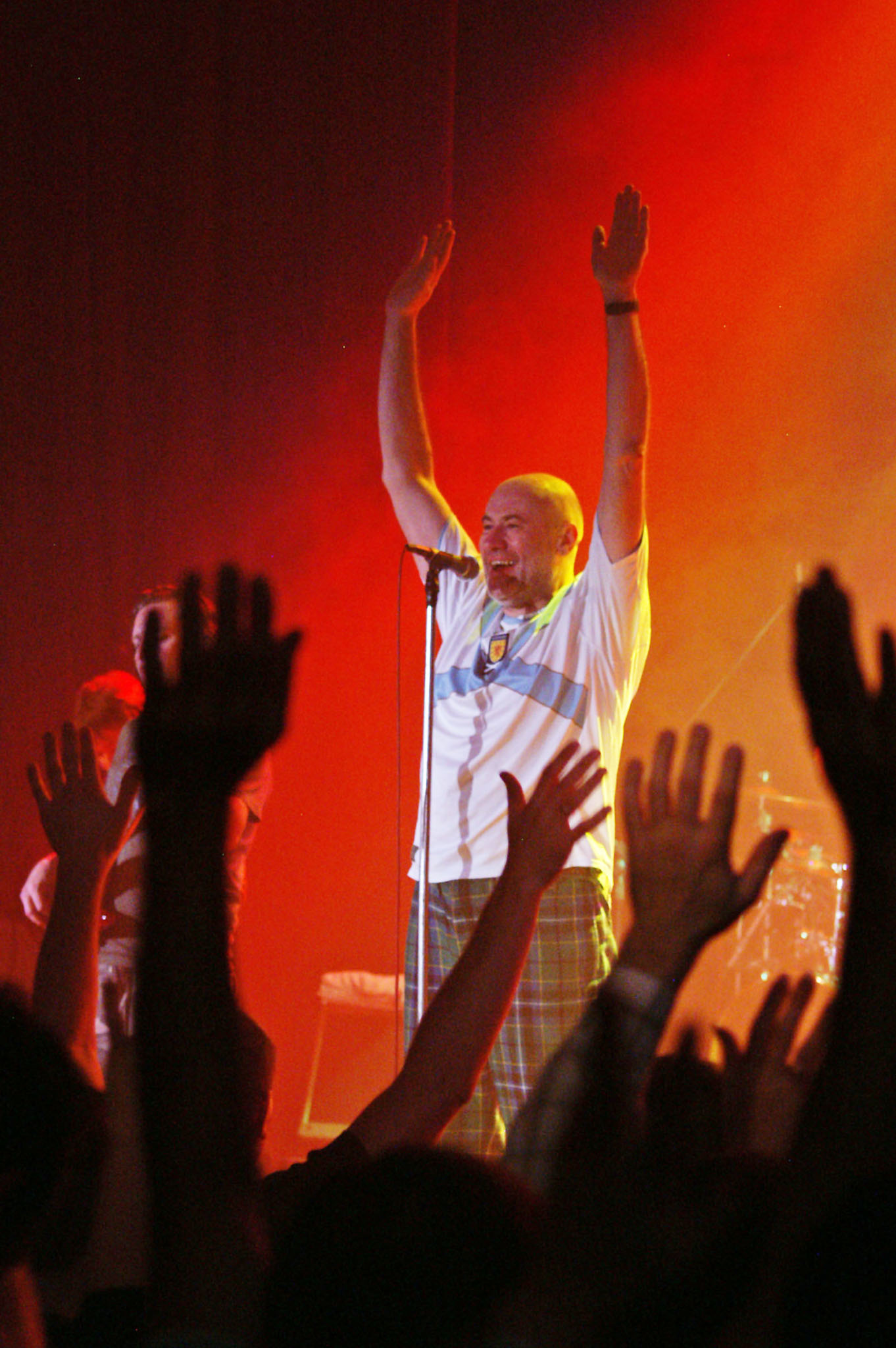
Fish during a concert in Poland, 2007

Many of Fish's later works contain lengthy spoken-word lyrics, shorter examples of which can be heard on earlier Marillion albums. He has collaborated with Genesis founder Tony Banks on Banks's Still and Soundtracks albums, singing on the tracks "Shortcut to Somewhere", "Angel Face" and "Another Murder of a Day", co-writing the latter.

His solo career has never received the same recognition or attention, and to a lot of people he went missing soon after the Vigil in a Wilderness of Mirrors album, in February 1990, the album peaked at number 5 in the UK Albums Chart. After finishing the Vigil World Tour at Royal Albert Hall on 9 July 1990, Fish was to enter litigation with EMI records resulting in a High Court injunction that stopped him releasing new music for almost a year. The extensive touring cost him dearly and the decision to go ahead with building a new studio in his home in Haddington Scotland meant that funds were rapidly depleted along with his confidence and his creative energies.

The prospect of writing the follow-up for the new label, Polydor, filled him with dread. His second album Internal Exile released in October 1991, was flirting with styles but never got into a particular groove and locking into a direction. The album's music reflected Fish's indulgence in the vast regions of music that he wanted to explore as a solo artist; most notably Celtic music and folk styles. The acquisition of Chris Kimsey as producer could not save the project as he attempted to come to terms with a newly built studio and Fish plagued by bitterness and cynicism toward the industry. Polydor had rushed the album out with his acquiescence resulted in a fractured promotion campaign and low sales, and the UK promoter went bankrupt just as the tour was about to kick off.

Polydor wanted a new studio album but Fish persisted and he decided to release an album of cover versions called Songs from the Mirror. Produced by James Cassidy, whom Fish met while both were working on Jeff Wayne's Spartacus album. They started recording in summer 1992 while simultaneously writing material for the next studio album Suits, a cynical examination lyrically of the music business and executives who still fed Fish's cynical outlook on life. Songs from the Mirror, released in January 1993, became the last album on Polydor. But the album was a turning point for Fish, and fully prepared him for the Suits sessions, material which he had been rehearsing constantly on tour as he struggled to pay bills and musicians. Fish formed his own record company, Dick Bros. after advice from a medium who passed on messages from his grandfather. The Co. was named after the garage business he had started and Fish's father had run throughout his childhood. The first release was Sushi, a live album to follow the five official bootleg releases, on Battleside, a company that temporarily filled the gap between Polydor and Dick Bros., and provided Fish with a lifeline and a quality alternative to the illegal live bootlegs that had followed his career.

His confidence had grown and was excited about the new songs on Suits released in 1994, some of which were co-written by James Cassidy who had stayed on since producing the Songs from the Mirror album to assist employing his classical training and expertise with arrangements. It proved invaluable and together with his awareness and experience with modern production techniques the material was guaranteed to enter a new direction and to gain a momentum that would usher the solo career into a new era. Touring took precedent and Fish was well aware that road work was at the expense of writing a new studio album. He went for the break and opted for the two "Best of's", Yin and Yang, containing re-recorded material from the Marillion era and solo albums, to give Fish the fuel and introduction to countries he had never managed to reach so far with his career. Released in 1995 these albums allowed him to stay on the road for nearly two years plugging away and hoping for the breakthrough that would give him the space to take a breath and write new material.

It never happened until 1997 when, after a tour in Bosnia, playing to the UN troops he reached the stage where he had to get experiences out and onto paper. Fish was introduced to Steven Wilson, who although sympathetic to the progressive rock genre, had no intention of getting involved in a regressive album, which suited Fish fine and welcomed Wilson's influence with open ears. The writing sessions were open and new songs and approaches were generated from a healthy friction between Wilson and Fish as they fought for their identities in the material. Grooves and loops led the rhythmic foundations into what they described as "Progressive Nouveaux", still retaining the drama and tension associated with Fish's previous work, but taking it into a more modern setting with a new edge and aggression. With Calum Malcolm's mix and Elliot Ness engineering skills provided a technical quality to match the standard of the writing on Sunsets on Empire. But once again the problem of underfunded promotion and advertising was to foil Fish's plans and a 115 date tour in 22 different countries was set up to attempt to give the album the attention it deserved. Seven months after its release the tour ground to an exhausted conclusion in December 1997. With a combination of tour losses and bad debts from third parties, Fish could no longer survive as an independent artist releasing his albums through Dick Bros. He was effectively broke and financing the recording of the album Raingods with Zippos were beyond his means.

Fish was asked to take part in a writing retreat in France by Miles Copeland. Together with 23 songwriters from all over the world, Fish rediscovered himself and when he returned with new songs he was excited and eager to get on with the job of redefining his career, and writing the rest of the new album. Three songs were taken from the sessions in France for the set up for Raingods with Zippos, together with a 25-minute epic called "Plague of Ghosts" written together with Tony Turrell and Mark Daghorn featuring Steven Wilson on guitar, and two tracks written with his old friend Mickey Simmonds. Raingods with Zippos was released by Roadrunner Records in April 1999. The Raingods album is often hailed as one of Fish's greatest solo achievements along with his 1990 debut.

In May 2001, Fish released his first studio album on his new independent label the Chocolate Frog Record Company, Fellini Days, which Fish co-wrote with John Wesley and John Young. Field of Crows was Fish's eighth solo studio album originally released in December 2003 and then to retail in May 2004. The album was mainly co-written with Bruce Watson and Irvin Duguid.

Fish appeared at World Bowl XI, 14 June 2003, Hampden Park, Glasgow. His performance included a rousing rendition of "Caledonia" before kick-off. In 2005, he won a Celebrity Music edition of The Weakest Link, beating Eggsy of Goldie Lookin Chain in the final round, sharing £18,750 with Eggsy's charity and his own.

On 26 August 2007, Fish performed at the 'Hobble on The Cobbles' show at the Market Square in Aylesbury. He was accompanied on stage by his four former Marillion bandmates from the classic line-up (Mark Kelly, Steve Rothery, Ian Mosley and Pete Trewavas) for one song: "Market Square Heroes". This was the first time they had performed together in nearly two decades. In a press interview following the event, Fish denied this would lead to a full reunion, claiming that "Hogarth does a great job with the band ... We forged different paths over the 19 years."

His album 13th Star was released on 12 September 2007 as a specially packaged pre-release version available to order from his website. A UK tour for this album commenced in March 2008, supported by Glyder. In February 2008, Fish was confirmed to be the Friday-night headline act at NEARFest X. He also appeared with BBC Radio 2's Bob Harris on GMTV to promote Childline Rocks, a charity concert.

In 2008, Fish presented a Friday evening radio show, Fish on Friday, for digital radio station Planet Rock. When the station was faced with closure, Malcolm Bluemel (with the help of Fish, Tony Iommi, Ian Anderson and Gary Moore) helped save Planet Rock by buying the station.

On 9 June 2008, Fish embarked on his first full North American tour in eleven years. At each stop, he hosted a pre-show meet-and-greet with his fans.

On 20 and 21 October 2012, Fish hosted Fish Convention 2012 in Leamington Spa. He performed two acoustic sets and two electric sets, including material from his then upcoming studio album, A Feast of Consequences. He also performed "Grendel", a fan-favourite Marillion B-side, twice. A Feast of Consequences was released in September 2013, supported by the single "Blind to the Beautiful".

Fish celebrated the 30th anniversary of the Marillion album Clutching at Straws on tour in 2018, alongside debuting material from his then upcoming studio album Weltschmerz. A three track EP, A Parley With Angels, was released in September 2018.

In April 2020, Fish revived his Fish on Friday show in the form of a weekly live video podcast, initially broadcast on Facebook (later simulcast on Facebook, YouTube and Twitter). Created during the COVID-19 pandemic to keep in touch with his fans and share stories from his career, the show was voted as the Event of the Year by Prog magazine readers in 2021. Fish on Friday remains active as of 2023, with new episodes of the show broadcast weekly.

In September 2020, Fish released Weltschmerz, his final studio album. The album was supported by the singles "Weltschmerz", "Garden of Remembrance" and "This Party's Over". The album received positive reviews and was commercially successful, having sold over 60,000 copies to date. Fish toured Weltschmerz and celebrated the 30th anniversary of A Vigil in a Wilderness of Mirrors as part of the Vigil's End tour in 2021. The tour was documented on the live album Vigil's End Tour 2021, released on physical formats in December 2022 and digitally in March 2023.

In November 2023, Primary Wave Music struck a deal with Fish, to acquire the singer and lyricist's master royalties and writer's share for songs he wrote and performed with Marillion.

== Musical style ==
Fish has sometimes been compared to Peter Gabriel, original lead singer of Genesis in the early 1970s, and his voice has even been described as "uncannily close". Music journalist David Hepworth described his voice as a "conflation of Roger Daltrey and Peter Gabriel". Fish has acknowledged Gabriel's influence on him and some vocal similarities, but has rejected accusations from some critics during his career that he does not have a unique voice of his own. Peter Hammill of Van der Graaf Generator was also a major influence on his songwriting and vocal delivery, which is especially notable on the first two Marillion albums.

In 2018, Fish told Planet Rock, "I don't look at myself as a singer, I'm not a technically gifted singer. I think one of the problems I had was back in the early Eighties I was singing very wrong, very unnatural. I think if I'd gone to see a voice coach at that point in my life they'd have said 'stop singing like that because you will not be able to keep that going for the rest of your life.'"

== Record labels ==
Following a legal dispute with EMI Records and an unsuccessful contract with Polydor, Fish established the Dick Bros Record Company in Haddington in 1993. The studio recorded In Amber by Dream Disciples (1994) and Man Dancin by Tam White in (1996). He released a number of "official bootleg" albums to finance the company before selling it to Roadrunner Records. Another financially unsuccessful period followed before he re-established his own Chocolate Frog Records label in 2001. He signed with Snapper Music in 2005, but later returned to Chocolate Frog Records.

After having his own independent record company in the 1990s which charted a number of releases, Fish decided not to sign up to the Official Charts Company when he released Weltschmerz, an album self-funded, marketed and distributed from his home in Scotland. As Fish did not partner with a record label as per chart rules and regulations, he missed out on a Top Ten chart placing when early sales revealed that he would have been number 2 on the UK midweek charts behind that week's chart topper, the independent band Idles.

== Awards ==
In May 2008, Fish's Planet Rock show Fish on Friday won the Silver award in the Music Broadcaster of the Year category at the UK Sony Radio Academy Awards 2008. In June 2008, at the New York Festivals Radio Broadcasting Awards, he and Gary Moore jointly received the Gold World Medal in the Regularly Scheduled Music Programme category for their respective shows on Planet Rock.

== Acting ==
Fish was offered and accepted a part in the 1986 film Highlander, for which Marillion were also offered the soundtrack, but he eventually had to turn it down owing to his tour commitments with the band. Fish first appeared on terrestrial television as himself in the "More Bad News" episode of the series The Comic Strip Presents... in 1988.

His first acting role was as a guest star in an episode of Zorro called "The Newcomers" (aired 10 February 1991) but a more prominent role was as the thug Ferguson alongside John Sessions in Jute City, a four-part 1991 BBC drama based on a group of Masonic ruffians.

In 1994, he appeared in Chasing the Deer, a film set during the 1745 Jacobite rebellion, as Angus Cameron. He also missed out on a role in Braveheart. He spent two days with Mel Gibson in London who kept asking him to be involved but he was committed to touring his Suits album instead.

In 1998, he appeared as David Lawson in series 14, episode 44 of the ITV series The Bill, titled "Manhunt", and played Derek Trout, a record producer in the series The Young Person's Guide To Becoming A Rock Star.

He appeared as Barry Judd in a 2000 episode of the TV detective series Rebus alongside John Hannah. Later that year he appeared in episode number 48, "Skin Deep", of the popular Scottish detective television programme Taggart.

In 2001, he auditioned (unsuccessfully) for the James Bond film Die Another Day. He then went on to appear in two episodes of Snoddy, a short-lived Scottish television sitcom.

In 2004, Fish played Finlay Price in the TV movie Quite Ugly One Morning alongside James Nesbitt, Eddie Marsan and Annette Crosbie.

Fish appeared as Old Nick, a camp homosexual, in the 2002 crime comedy film 9 Dead Gay Guys.

In the 2005 film The Jacket, Fish appeared alongside Adrien Brody and Keira Knightley as a patient in a mental institution, Jimmy Fleischer, and he played Uncle Jimmy in the 2012 comedy drama Electric Man.

== Personal life ==
On 25 July 1987, Fish married his first wife, Tamara Nowy, a German model who appeared in the music videos for "Kayleigh", "Lady Nina", "Sugar Mice" and "A Gentleman's Excuse Me". They divorced in 2003. The marriage produced one daughter.

Following the divorce, Fish entered into a relationship with Mostly Autumn singer Heather Findlay. Later, he entered into a relationship with Katie Webb, and they married in April 2009. The couple divorced after less than a year. On 14 October 2017, he married his third wife, Simone Rösler, at Aberlady Church, East Lothian.

In 2008, Fish stated that he would be taking at least six months off from singing due to an "irregular cell growth" in his throat. It was later determined not to be cancerous.

Fish is a fan of Edinburgh football club Hibernian. He also has a keen interest in marine science.

In mid-2023, Fish announced plans to permanently relocate to a 35-acre crofting smallholding on the Outer Hebridean island of Berneray, North Uist with his wife in 2024/5, as he retires from the music industry.

Fish is self-diagnosed with autism.

== Politics ==
On politics, Fish said in 1993, "I've got a lot of socialist trends, but I work in a capitalist industry. Getting involved in politics can be very dangerous. There are a lot of doors that can shut when you get involved in politics." He is a supporter of Scottish independence because he is "dismayed" by the UK's anti-European stance and does not believe a "London-based government" is "beneficial to the UK as a whole". Fish argued that independence could "shake up British politics" to ensure a more "fair distribution of wealth" throughout the UK. He declined to actively campaign in the 2014 Scottish independence referendum because he believed it would be "hypocritical" as he was planning to leave Scotland for Germany to live with his partner and her young son.

== Final live band ==
- Fish – Lead vocals
- Robin Boult – Electric and acoustic guitars
- Steve Vantsis – Bass guitar, keyboards, backing vocals
- Mickey Simmonds – Keyboards, backing vocals
- Gavin Griffiths – Drums, percussion
- Liz Antwi – backing vocals

== Discography with Marillion ==
=== Studio albums ===
- 1983: Script for a Jester's Tear
- 1984: Fugazi
- 1985: Misplaced Childhood
- 1987: Clutching at Straws

=== Live albums ===
- 1984: Real to Reel
- 1988: The Thieving Magpie
- 2008: Early Stages: The Official Bootleg Box Set 1982–1987
- 2009: Live From Loreley
- 2009: Recital of the Script

=== Compilation albums ===
- 1986: Brief Encounter
- 1988: B'Sides Themselves
- 2000: The Singles '82–'88 (box set)

=== Video albums ===
- 1983: Recital of the Script (Reissued on DVD in 2003 includes Grendel / The Web EP)
- 1984: Grendel / The Web EP
- 1986: The Videos 1982–1986
- 1987: Incommunicado / Sugar Mice
- 1987: Live from Loreley (Reissued on VHS / CD package in 1995 and on DVD in 2004).

=== Singles ===
- 1982: "Market Square Heroes"
- 1983: "He Knows You Know"
- 1983: "Garden Party"
- 1984: "Punch and Judy"
- 1984: "Assassing"
- 1985: "Kayleigh"
- 1985: "Lavender"
- 1985: "Heart of Lothian"
- 1986: "Lady Nina" (US only)
- 1986: "Welcome to the Garden Party" (West Germany only)
- 1987: "Incommunicado"
- 1987: "Sugar Mice"
- 1987: "Warm Wet Circles"
- 1988: "Freaks" (Live)

== Solo discography ==
=== Studio albums ===
- Vigil in a Wilderness of Mirrors (1990)
- Internal Exile (1991)
- Songs from the Mirror (1993)
- Suits (1994)
- Sunsets on Empire (1997)
- Raingods with Zippos (1999)
- Fellini Days (2001)
- Field of Crows (2004)
- 13th Star (2007)
- A Feast of Consequences (2013)
- Weltschmerz (2020)
