= He Knows You Know =

1983 single by Marillion

Single by Marillion

from the album Script for a Jester's Tear
- B-side: "Charting the Single"
- Released: 31 January 1983 (UK)
- Recorded: Marquee Studios, London
- Length: 3:30 (7"); 5:05 (12"); 5:24 (album)
- Label: EMI
- Songwriters: Derek Dick, Steve Rothery, Peter Trewavas, Michael Pointer, Mark Kelly, Diz Minnitt & Brian Jelliman
- Producer: Nick Tauber

Marillion singles chronology
"Market Square Heroes" (1982)	"He Knows You Know" (1983)	"Garden Party" (1983)

Audio sample
- He Knows You Know: file; help

"He Knows You Know" is a song by the British neo-prog band Marillion. It was their second single, with "Charting the Single" as the B-side. It was released from their first album, Script for a Jester's Tear, and peaked at number 35 on the UK Singles Chart. The song's theme is drug abuse, and alludes particularly to intravenous drug use. In concert, lead vocalist Fish would often introduce it as "The Drug Song" and state that it was inspired by drug use while he was working at the Job/Benefits centre in Aylesbury.

As with all Marillion songs during this period, the lyrics were written by Fish. The music video for this song features Fish struggling in a straitjacket having visions of a Jackson's chameleon as featured on the album artwork of Marillion's first three albums.

"He Knows You Know" is the only 12-inch single from Marillion's first three albums that was never produced as a picture disc. The song was supposed to be performed live on Top of the Pops in 1983, but as Fish explains during the concert recorded for Recital of the Script, this never happened. However, a live version was later recorded for the BBC Oxford Road Show.

A CD replica of the single was also part of a collectors' box-set released in July 2000, which contained Marillion's first twelve singles and was re-issued as a 3-CD set in 2009 (see The Singles '82-'88).

== Track listing 7" version ==
Side A

1. "He Knows You Know" (single edit) – 3:33

Side B

1. "Charting the Single" – 4:53

== Track listing 12" version ==
Side A

1. "He Knows You Know" (album version) – 5:07

Side B

1. "He Knows You Know" (single edit) – 3:33
2. "Charting the Single" – 4:53

== Personnel ==
- Fish – vocals
- Steve Rothery – guitars
- Mark Kelly – keyboards
- Pete Trewavas – bass
- Mick Pointer – drums
