= Garden Party (Marillion song) =

Single by Marillion

from the album Script for a Jester's Tear
- B-side: "Margaret"
- Released: 6 June 1983 (UK)
- Length: 4:35 (7"); 7:15 (12")
- Label: EMI
- Songwriters: Fish, Steve Rothery, Pete Trewavas, Mark Kelly, Mick Pointer, Diz Minnett, and Brian Jelliman
- Producer: Nick Tauber

Marillion singles chronology
"He Knows You Know" (1983)	"Garden Party" (1983)	"Punch and Judy" (1984)

Audio sample
- Garden Party: file; help

"Garden Party (The Great Cucumber Massacre)" is a song by the British neo-prog band Marillion. It was the second single released from their debut album Script for a Jester's Tear. It reached number 16 in the UK Singles Chart in 1983, the band's biggest singles chart success prior to 1985. The song is a parody of social elitism and snobbery. The B-side is a live version of "Margaret" (recorded at Edinburgh Playhouse, 7 April 1983). The 12" single includes a live version of "Charting The Single" (recorded at Hammersmith Odeon, 18 April 1983).

A CD replica of the single was also part of a collectors box-set released in July 2000 which contained Marillion's first twelve singles and was re-issued as a 3-CD set in 2009 (see The Singles '82-'88).

== Track listing ==
=== 7" Versions ===
==== Side A ====
1. "Garden Party" [Edited version] – 04:29

==== Side B ====
1. "Margaret" [Edited live version, Edinburgh Playhouse, 7 April 1983] – 04:09

=== 12" Versions ===
==== Side A ====
1. "Garden Party" [Full version] – 07:11
2. "Charting the Single" [Live version, London Hammersmith Odeon, 18 April 1983] – 06:30

==== Side B ====
1. "Margaret" [Full live version, Edinburgh Playhouse, 7 April 1983] – 12:17

== Lyrics ==
After the synth/guitar break in the middle of the song, a verse starts:

I'm punting
I'm beagling
I'm wining
Reclining
I'm rucking
I'm miming
(So welcome) It's a party!

The original lyrics read "I'm fucking", replaced by "I'm miming" in the shorter radio-friendly 7" single release. "Rucking" in the previous line is a rugby term; the sport is referred to earlier in the song. Fish appeared on shows such as Top of the Pops, the UK's long running chart show and, at the point where he ought to be singing the broadcastable "miming", he shut his mouth and merely pointed at his lips as the words came over the PA. The album version (which was also included on the 12" release) contained the original lyric.

== Personnel ==
- Fish – vocals
- Steve Rothery - guitars
- Mark Kelly - keyboards
- Pete Trewavas - bass
- Mick Pointer - drums
