= Script for a Jester's Tear =

1983 studio album by Marillion

- Cover art by Mark Wilkinson

Studio album by Marillion
- Released: 14 March 1983
- Recorded: December 1982 – February 1983
- Studios: The Marquee, London
- Genre: Neo-prog
- Length: 46:45
- Label: EMI
- Producer: Nick Tauber

Marillion chronology
Script for a Jester's Tear (1983)	Fugazi (1984)

Singles from Script for a Jester's Tear
- 1. "He Knows You Know" Released: 31 January 1983; 2. "Garden Party" Released: 6 June 1983

Professional ratings
Review scores
Source	Rating
AllMusic	4.5/5 stars
Record Mirror	4/5 stars
Smash Hits	4/10

Script for a Jester's Tear is the debut studio album by British neo-prog band Marillion, released in the United Kingdom on 14 March 1983 by EMI Records. The album reached number seven and spent 31 weeks in the UK Albums Chart, eventually achieving a platinum certificate, and produced the top 40 single "He Knows You Know" and the top 20 single "Garden Party". Prog Magazine ranked it at No. 40 in its list of the "100 Greatest Prog Albums of All Time."

Script for a Jester's Tear is the only studio album by Marillion to feature the band's original drummer and founding member Mick Pointer, who was dismissed following the album's UK tour. In Martin Popoff's 2016 biography of Yes, the album is credited with being part of a "new wave" of British progressive rock which also helped to give a second life to earlier bands.

== Background and recording ==
Marillion released their first single, "Market Square Heroes", on 25 October 1982. It was a minor hit, peaking at number 53 on the UK Singles Chart. It was produced by David Hitchcock, who was also contracted to work on the group's first full-length album. He was seriously injured in a car accident when he drove home after completing work on the single. EMI took advantage of the opportunity and persuaded the group to replace him with Nick Tauber, a producer known for his work with new wave band Toyah and regarded by the record label as more modern.

Neither "Market Square Heroes", nor the B-sides of the 12" single, "Three Boats Down from the Candy" and the 17-minute-long epic "Grendel", were included on Script for a Jester's Tear, although a short radio segment of the A-side can be briefly heard prior to "Forgotten Sons". As stated in the original liner notes, the music from the album was composed, arranged and performed by Marillion and the lyrics were written by Fish alone. In the 1997 remastered edition, four out of six songs are additionally credited to bass player Diz Minnit and keyboard player Brian Jelliman, who were both early members of the group. The recording sessions for the album started in December 1982 at The Marquee Studios in London and finished in February 1983, with Tauber producing and Simon Hanhart engineering.

The cover artwork was designed by Mark Wilkinson, who would be commissioned to the role on all Marillion releases through The Thieving Magpie (1988).

In later years, both Fish and Steve Rothery have spoken critically of their work on the album. Fish said in 2016, "I hear somebody singing in very bad keys! Sometimes I don't even recognise the guy who's singing on that album. That high falsetto voice, it was very forced. But I was young. I didn't understand anything about music and keys, and I was singing very high." Rothery was not satisfied with his guitar sound. He said in 2022, "I didn't have the experience, I didn't know the sound I wanted, so I was using maybe my old Yamaha SG-2000. I think I had an Orange amp in the early days. I can't remember when I switched to Marshalls. Anyway, it wasn't a sound that I was in love with."

== Release ==
Script for a Jester's Tear was released in the United Kingdom on 13 March 1983 by EMI on vinyl housed in a gatefold sleeve. In the United States and Canada, it was available through Capitol Records.

=== Critical reception ===
In his review for Kerrang!, Dave Dickson said, "As a debut album this is extremely impressive, fully living up to the band's previous promise". John Franck gave the album a retrospective rating of four-and-a-half stars out of five on AllMusic. He called it "a vital piece for any Marillion head and an essential work for any self-respecting first- or second-generation prog rock fan".

=== Commercial performance ===
Script for a Jester's Tear was a commercial success, reaching number seven in the United Kingdom and spending 31 weeks on the charts, the second-longest album chart residency for Marillion. It was awarded a platinum certification by British Phonographic Industry on 5 December 1997 for over 300,000 copies sold. In the United States, it failed to make any impact, peaking at number 175 on the Billboard 200 chart.

The album generated two hit singles in the United Kingdom. The first single, "He Knows You Know", preceded the release of Script for a Jester's Tear and launched the group into the top 40, reaching number 35. The second single, "Garden Party", was released on 6 June 1983 and peaked at number 16. "He Knows You Know" gained some airplay in the United States and reached number 21 on the Billboard Mainstream Rock chart.

=== Reissues ===
Script for a Jester's Tear was first released on CD in 1985. As part of a series of Marillion eight studio albums made on a contract with EMI, the album was 24-bit digitally remastered between April and July 1997 and expanded with a second disc containing bonus tracks, including all tracks from the debut single. This edition was issued on 29 September 1997 and has been in print to date. The remastered version was also issued without the second disc in 2000 and contained a pared-down booklet. A new 180g heavy weight vinyl edition featuring a gatefold sleeve and the original artwork was released in 2012.

In 2020, EMI released a deluxe version of the album with four CDs and a Blu-ray disc that contains new remixes of the original album, the full "Market Square Heroes" 12" single (except for the original version of "Market Square Heroes" which is replaced by the "Battle Priest" version), and a previously unreleased live set from 1982 at London's Marquee Club. In addition to that, the Blu-ray also includes the previously released Recital of the Script video and, as extras, promo films of some tracks from the album. It was the penultimate release of Fish era Marillion albums in a recent deluxe reissue campaign that also includes Misplaced Childhood, Clutching at Straws, Brave, and Afraid of Sunlight. Fugazi is the last album put out in this format so far, having been released on 1 September 2021.

== Track listing ==
All lyrics are written by Fish.

Side one
No.	Title	Writer(s)	Length
1.	"Script for a Jester's Tear"	Fish, Steve Rothery, Pete Trewavas, Mick Pointer, Mark Kelly	8:40
2.	"He Knows You Know"	Fish, Rothery, Trewavas, Kelly, Pointer, Diz Minnitt, Brian Jelliman	5:23
3.	"The Web"	Fish, Trewavas, Kelly, Pointer, Rothery, Minnitt, Jelliman	8:48

Side two
No.	Title	Writer(s)	Length
4.	"Garden Party"	Fish, Kelly, Rothery, Trewavas, Pointer, Jelliman, Minnitt	7:16
5.	"Chelsea Monday"	Fish, Rothery, Trewavas, Kelly, Pointer, Minnitt	8:17
6.	"Forgotten Sons"	Fish, Rothery, Trewavas, Kelly, Pointer, Jelliman, Minnitt	8:21
Total length:			46:45

1997 EMI Records remastered edition bonus disc
No.	Title	Writer(s)	Length
1.	"Market Square Heroes" (Battle Priest version)	Fish, Rothery, Trewavas, Kelly, Pointer, Minnitt	4:17
2.	"Three Boats Down from the Candy"	Fish, Rothery, Trewavas, Kelly, Pointer, Minnitt	4:30
3.	"Grendel" (Fair Deal Studios version)	Fish, Rothery, Trewavas, Kelly, Pointer, Minnitt, Jelliman	19:08
4.	"Chelsea Monday" (Manchester Square demo)	Fish, Rothery, Trewavas, Kelly, Pointer, Minnitt	6:52
5.	"He Knows You Know" (Manchester Square demo)	Fish, Rothery, Trewavas, Kelly, Pointer, Minnitt, Jelliman	4:28
6.	"Charting the Single"	Fish, Rothery, Trewavas, Kelly, Pointer	4:51
7.	"Market Square Heroes" (alternative version)	Fish, Rothery, Trewavas, Kelly, Pointer, Minnitt	4:48
Total length:			49:04

== Personnel ==
=== Marillion ===
- Fish – vocals
- Steve Rothery – guitars; photography (1997 remastered edition)
- Pete Trewavas – bass
- Mark Kelly – keyboards; digital remastering (at Abbey Road Studios, London, April – July 1997)
- Mick Pointer – drums, percussion

=== Additional musicians ===
- Marquee Club's Parents Association Children's Choir – choir (on "Forgotten Sons")
- Peter Cockburn – newscaster's voice (on "Forgotten Sons")

=== Technical personnel ===
- Nick Tauber – producer
- Simon Hanhart – engineer, mixing engineer
- Pete James – sound effects
- Jo Mirowski – art direction, design (at Torchlight, London)
- Mark Wilkinson – illustration
- Dave Hitchcock – producer (on "Market Square Heroes" (Battle Priest version), "Three Boats Down from the Candy")
- Craig Thompson – engineer (on "Market Square Heroes" (Battle Priest version), "Three Boats Down from the Candy")
- Danny Dawson – engineer (on "Chelsea Monday" (Manchester Square demo), "He Knows You Know" (Manchester Square demo)
- Pete Mew – digital remastering (at Abbey Road Studios, London, April – July 1997)
- Bill Smith Studio – repackaging design (1997 remastered edition)

== Charts ==
Chart (1983–1985)	Peak position
Canada Top Albums/CDs (RPM)	51
Swedish Albums (Sverigetopplistan)	42
UK Albums (Official Charts)	7
US Billboard 200	175

Chart (2020–2021)	Peak position
Dutch Albums (Album Top 100)	56
German Albums (Offizielle Top 100)	5
Hungarian Albums (MAHASZ)	32
Polish Albums (ZPAV)	39
Scottish Albums (Official Charts)	4
UK Albums (Official Charts)	35
UK Rock & Metal Albums (Official Charts)	3

== Certifications ==
Region	Certification	Certified units/sales
United Kingdom (BPI)	Platinum	300,000^{^}
^{^} Shipments figures based on certification alone.
