= Lavender (Marillion song) =

1985 single by Marillion

Single by Marillion

from the album Misplaced Childhood
- B-side: "Freaks"
- Released: 27 August 1985
- Recorded: March–May 1985
- Studio: Hansa Ton (Berlin, Germany)
- Length: 3:40 (7-inch)
- Label: EMI
- Songwriters: Fish, Mark Kelly, Steve Rothery, Pete Trewavas, Ian Mosley
- Producer: Chris Kimsey for Wonderknob Ltd

Marillion singles chronology
"Kayleigh" (1985)	"Lavender" (1985)	"Heart of Lothian" (1985)

Audio sample
- file; help

"Lavender" is a song by the British neo-prog band Marillion. It was released as the second single from their 1985 UK number one concept album Misplaced Childhood. The follow-up to the UK number two hit "Kayleigh", the song was their second Top Five UK hit, entering the chart on 7 September 1985, reaching number five and staying on the chart for nine weeks. None of the group's subsequent songs have reached the Top Five and "Lavender" remains their second highest-charting song. As with all Marillion albums and singles between 1982 and 1988, the cover art was created by Mark Wilkinson.

== Inspiration and composition ==
The song features a number of verses that are reminiscent of the folk song "Lavender's Blue". The song forms part of the concept of the Misplaced Childhood album. Like "Kayleigh" it is a love song, but whereas "Kayleigh" was about the failure of an adult relationship, "Lavender" recalls the innocence of childhood:

The childhood theme also brought up the idea of utilising an old children's song and "Lavender" was an obvious contender as one of the original pop songs of its time.

The opening lines "I was walking in the park dreaming of a spark, when I heard the sprinklers whisper, shimmer in the haze of summer lawns" deliberately recall the title track of Joni Mitchell's album The Hissing of Summer Lawns.

Unusually for a rock song from the mid-1980s, "Lavender" features a traditional grand piano rather than an electronic keyboard or electric piano. In the music video, keyboardist Mark Kelly is seen playing a Bechstein but the original sleeve notes of the Misplaced Childhood album state that a Bösendorfer was used for the recording.

On the album Misplaced Childhood, "Lavender" is a short track of barely two and a half minutes, forming part of a longer suite that continues into the likewise multi-portioned track "Bitter Suite", which repeats Lavender's musical motif at the end. In order to be suitable for a single release, the track therefore needed to be re-arranged and extended. As a result, the 7" version is significantly longer than the album version (3:40 as opposed to 2:27), while the 12" version – entitled "Lavender Blue" – is even longer at 4:18.

== Legacy ==
The song features on several Marillion compilation albums, including A Singles Collection (1992), The Best of Both Worlds (1997) and The Best of Marillion (2003). A CD replica of the single was also part of a collectors box-set released in July 2000 which contained Marillion's first twelve singles and was re-issued as a 3-CD set in 2009 (see The Singles '82–88').

== Appearance in other media ==
The song featured in the first episode of the BBC 3 black comedy TV series Nighty Night, the former airing in 2004.

== Track listing ==
=== 7" Single ===
==== Side A ====
1. "Lavender " – 3:40

==== Side B ====
1. "Freaks" – 4:10

=== 12" Single ===
==== Side A ====
1. "Lavender Blue" – 4:20

==== Side B ====
1. "Freaks" – 4:10
2. "Lavender " – 3:40

=== Marillion – The Singles "82–88" ===
1. "Lavender" – 3:40
2. "Freaks" – 4:10
3. "Lavender Blue" – 4:20

== Personnel ==
- Fish – vocals
- Steve Rothery – guitars
- Mark Kelly – keyboards
- Pete Trewavas – bass
- Ian Mosley – drums

== Charts ==
=== Weekly charts ===
Chart (1985)	Peak position
Europe (European Hot 100 Singles)	18
Ireland (IRMA)	5
UK Singles (OCC)	5
West Germany (GfK)	39

=== Year-end charts ===
Chart (1985)	Position
UK Singles (OCC)	90
