= Mick Pointer =

British drummer

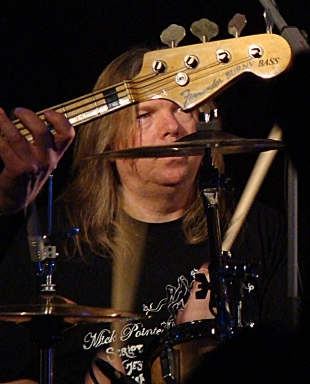
- Pointer in 2009

Background information
- Born: Michael Pointer; 22 July 1956 (age 70); Brill, Buckinghamshire, England
- Genres: Neo-progressive rock
- Occupation: Drummer
- Years active: 1979–present

Michael Pointer (born 22 July 1956) is an English drummer. He is known for his work in the neo-prog bands Marillion and Arena.

== Career ==
Pointer was the original drummer and a founding member of Marillion. He appeared on the band's debut EP Market Square Heroes (1982) and debut LP Script for a Jester's Tear (1983). He was sacked from the band following the album's UK tour and ultimately replaced by Jonathan Mover and then by Ian Mosley. Lead singer Fish later told Classic Rock that Pointer had been dismissed because he had "never liked Mick's drumming", "his timing was awful" and "everybody was developing except him".

After his acrimonious departure from Marillion, Pointer did not perform music for another ten years. Instead, he became a kitchen designer, something he had served an apprenticeship in as a teenager. Pointer eventually founded the progressive band Arena, in which he continues to play with keyboardist Clive Nolan (from Pendragon). He is Nolan's business partner in his record label.

Pointer later gathered a band for "Mick Pointer's Script for a Jester's Tear tour", comprising Brian Cummins (Carpet Crawlers) on vocals, Nick Barrett (Pendragon) on lead guitar, Mike Varty (Credo) on keyboards and Ian Salmon (Arena) on bass guitar, to perform Marillion's debut album for its 25th anniversary. Pointer had originally intended to call it Mick Pointer, ex-Marillion; however, the remaining members of the band objected to him using the name, and threatened him with legal action.
