= Mike Portnoy discography =

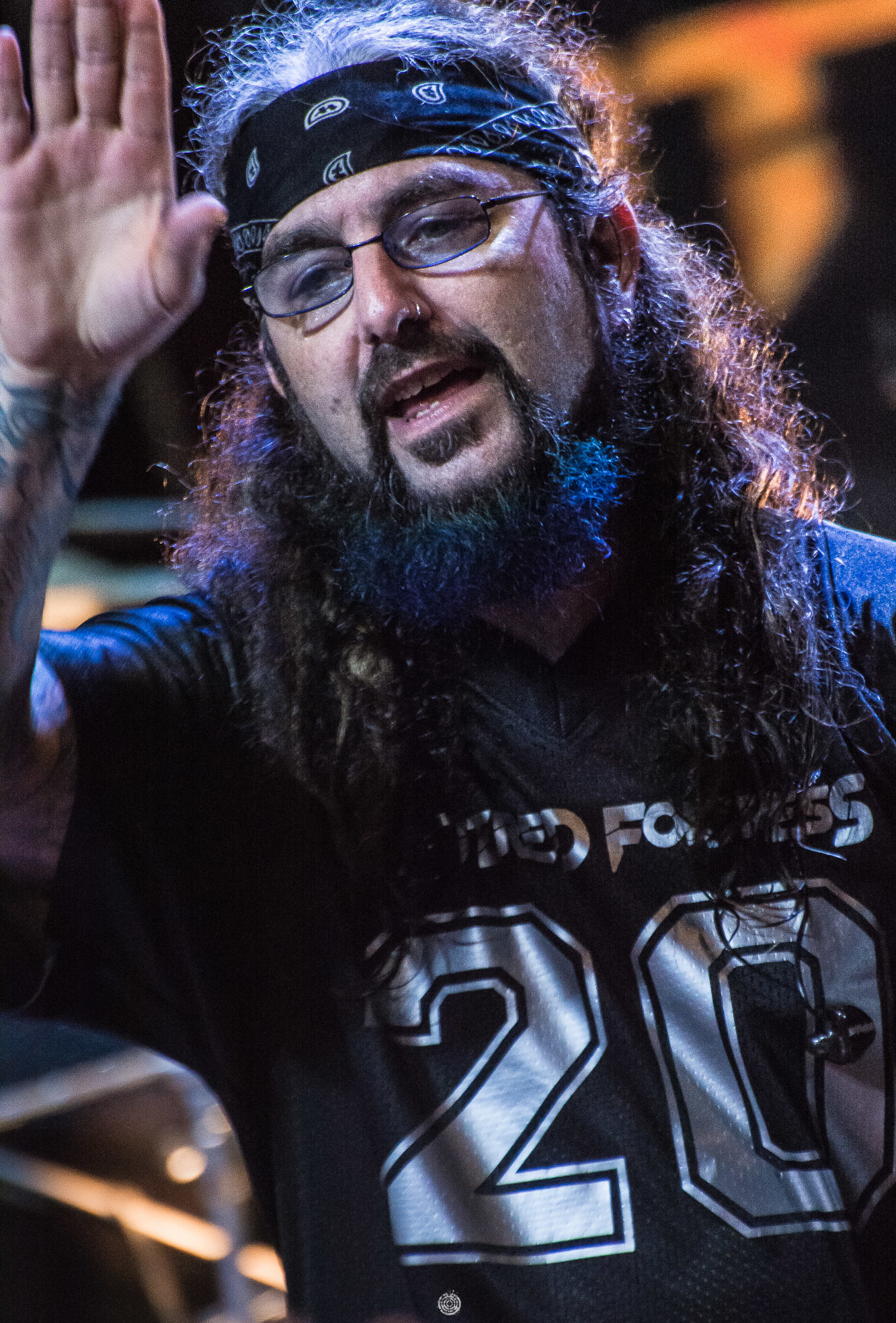
Portnoy in 2017

This is a discography of works by American drummer Mike Portnoy. For more information about recordings made by Dream Theater see Dream Theater discography.

== Albums discography ==
Year	Band	Title	Notes
1984	Rising Power	Power for the People	
1986	Inner Sanctum	12 A.M.	
1986	S. A. Adams	Unearthed	
1986	Majesty	Majesty	demos
1989	Dream Theater	When Dream and Day Unite	
1992	Dream Theater	Images and Words	
1993	Dream Theater	Live at the Marquee	Recorded at the Marquee Club in London, England, on April 23, 1993.
1993	Dream Theater	Images and Words: Live in Tokyo	Recorded at Nakano Sun Plaza in Tokyo, Japan, on August 26, 1993.
1994	Dream Theater	Awake	
1995	Dream Theater	A Change of Seasons	EP album. Contains live tracks recorded at Ronnie Scott's Jazz Club in London on January 31, 1995.
1996	Various Artists	Working Man – A Tribute to Rush	Portnoy drums on six tracks
1997	Dream Theater	Falling into Infinity	
1998	Dream Theater	Once in a LIVEtime	Recorded at the Bataclan in Paris, France, on June 25, 1998.
1998	Liquid Tension Experiment	Liquid Tension Experiment	
1999	Liquid Tension Experiment	Liquid Tension Experiment 2	
1999	Dream Theater	Metropolis Pt. 2: Scenes from a Memory	
1999	Various Artists	Encores Legends & Paradox; A Tribute to the Music of ELP	Portnoy drums on two tracks
2000	Transatlantic	SMPT:e	
2001	Transatlantic	Bridge Across Forever	
2001	Transatlantic	Live in America	Recorded in Philadelphia, Pennsylvania, and Washington, D.C. in June 2000.
2001	Dream Theater	Live Scenes from New York	Recorded at the Roseland Ballroom in New York, New York, on August 30, 2000.
2002	Dream Theater	Six Degrees of Inner Turbulence	
2002	Andy West	Rama 1	
2002	Transatlantic	Building the Bridge	The Making of Bridge Across Forever documentary
2003	OSI	Office of Strategic Influence	
2003	Neal Morse	Testimony	
2003	Transatlantic	Live in Europe	Recorded at the 013 in Tilburg, Netherlands, on November 12, 2001.
2003	John Arch	A Twist of Fate	EP
2003	Dream Theater	Train of Thought	
2004	Neal Morse	One	
2004	Dream Theater	Live at Budokan	Recorded at the Budokan Hall in Tokyo, Japan, on April 26, 2004.
2004	Neal Morse	Testimony Live 2003	Recorded at the 013 in Tilburg, Netherlands on November 17, 2003.
2005	Dream Theater	Octavarium	
2005	Neal Morse	?	
2005	G3	G3: Live in Tokyo	Portnoy drums on three tracks
2005	Yellow Matter Custard	One Night in New York City	tribute to The Beatles (with Paul Gilbert, Neal Morse, and Matt Bissonette)
2006	OSI	Free	
2006	Morse/Portnoy/George	Cover to Cover	
2006	Dream Theater	Score	Recorded at the Radio City Music Hall in New York, New York, on April 1, 2006.
2006	Hammer of the Gods	Two Nights in North America	tribute to Led Zeppelin (with Paul Gilbert, Daniel Gildenlöw, and Dave LaRue)
2006	Cygnus and the Sea Monsters	One Night in Chicago	tribute to Rush (with Paul Gilbert, Sean Malone, and Jason McMaster)
2006	Various Artists	Gigantour	Dream Theater performed The Glass Prison and Panic Attack on this DVD release of the 2005 Gigantour.
2007	Neal Morse	Sola Scriptura	
2007	Dream Theater	Systematic Chaos	
2007	Liquid Tension Experiment	Spontaneous Combustion	as Liquid Trio Experiment
2007	Amazing Journey	One Night in New York City	tribute to The Who (with Paul Gilbert, Billy Sheehan, and Gary Cherone)
2008	Neal Morse	Lifeline	
2008	Dream Theater	Chaos in Motion 2007–2008	Recorded in various places between 2007 and 2008.
2009	Transatlantic	The Whirlwind	
2009	Liquid Tension Experiment	Live in NYC	Recorded at BB King's in New York City, on June 23, 2008.
2009	Liquid Tension Experiment	When the Keyboard Breaks: Live in Chicago	As Liquid Trio Experiment. Recorded live in Chicago, Illinois, on June 25, 2008.
2009	Liquid Tension Experiment	Live in LA	Recorded live at the Downey Theatre, Downey, CA, on June 27, 2008.
2009	Dream Theater	Black Clouds & Silver Linings	Last album with Dream Theater until 2025
2009	Dream Theater	Wither	EP
2010	Avenged Sevenfold	Nightmare	
2010	Avenged Sevenfold	Welcome to the Family	EP
2010	Transatlantic	Whirld Tour 2010: Live in London	Recorded at Shepherd's Bush Empire in London, England, on May 21, 2010.
2011	Adrenaline Mob	Adrenaline Mob	EP
2011	Neal Morse	Testimony 2	
2011	Transatlantic	More Never Is Enough: Live In Manchester & Tilburg 2010	Recorded in Manchester, England, and Tilburg, Netherlands in May 2010.
2011	Yellow Matter Custard	One More Night in New York City	tribute to The Beatles (with Paul Gilbert, Neal Morse, and Kasim Sulton)
2011	Neal Morse	Testimony 2: Live in Los Angeles	Recorded at the Whittier Theater, Los Angeles, CA on May 28, 2011.
2012	Adrenaline Mob	Omertà	
2012	Flying Colors	Flying Colors	
2012	Morse/Portnoy/George	Cover 2 Cover	
2012	Neal Morse	Momentum	
2012	The Prog World Orchestra	A Proggy Christmas	
2013	Adrenaline Mob	Covertà	Cover EP that covers Badlands, Dio, The Doors, Van Halen, Heart, Rainbow, Led Zeppelin and Black Sabbath
2013	The Winery Dogs	The Winery Dogs	
2013	The Winery Dogs	Unleashed in Japan	Recorded at the Nippon Seinen-Kan in Tokyo, Japan on July 17 2013.
2013	Portnoy, Sheehan, MacAlpine and Sherinian (PSMS)	Live In Tokyo	Material from their individual and collaborative careers. Recorded at the Zepp, in Tokyo, Japan, on November 14, 2012.
2013	Flying Colors	Live in Europe	Recorded at the 013, Tilburg, Netherlands on September 21, 2012.
2013	Neal Morse	Live Momentum	Recorded at the Highline Ballroom in New York City on October 11, 2012.
2014	Transatlantic	Kaleidoscope	
2014	Bigelf	Into the Maelstrom	
2014	Paul Gilbert	Stone Pushing Uphill Man	2 tracks
2014	Flying Colors	Second Nature	
2014	Haken	Restoration	Gong on "Crystallised"
2014	Transatlantic	KaLIVEoscope	Recorded in Cologne, Germany and Tilburg, Netherlands in March 2014.
2015	The Neal Morse Band	The Grand Experiment	
2015	Metal Allegiance	Metal Allegiance	Collaborative Album with David Ellefson from Megadeth and Alex Skolnick from Testament
2015	The Winery Dogs	Hot Streak	
2015	Flying Colors	Second Flight: Live at the Z7	Recorded at the Z7 in Pratteln, Switzerland, on October 12, 2014.
2015	Neal Morse	Morsefest 2014: Testimony and One LIVE	Recorded at New Life Fellowship in White House, TN.
2016	Twisted Sister	Metal Meltdown	Recorded at the Hard Rock Hotel, Las Vegas, USA on May 30, 2015.
2016	The Neal Morse Band	The Similitude of a Dream	
2016	The Neal Morse Band	Alive Again	Recorded at the Cultuurpodium Boerderij in Zoetermeer, Netherlands on March 6, 2015.
2016	Metal Allegiance	Fallen Heroes	EP
2016	Tiles	Pretending 2 Run	Guest drums on two tracks
2017	The Winery Dogs	Dog Years / Live in Santiago & Beyond 2013–2016	EP and live release box
2017	Sons of Apollo	Psychotic Symphony	
2017	Neal Morse	Morsefest 2015: ? and Sola Scriptura LIVE	Recorded at New Life Fellowship in White House, TN.
2018	Metal Allegiance	Volume II: Power Drunk Majesty	
2018	The Neal Morse Band	The Similitude of a Dream: Live in Tilburg 2017	Recorded at the 013, Tilburg, Netherlands on April 2, 2017.
2018	The Neal Morse Band	Morsefest 2017: Testimony of a Dream	Recorded at New Life Fellowship in White House, TN.
2019	The Neal Morse Band	The Great Adventure	
2019	Sons of Apollo	Live With The Plovdiv Psychotic Symphony	Recorded at the Ancient Roman Theatre, Plovdiv, Bulgaria in September 2018
2019	Flying Colors	Third Degree	
2019	Noturnall	Scream! For!! Me!!!	Single released in October 2019
2020	Sons of Apollo	MMXX	
2020	Morse/Portnoy/George	Cov3r to Cov3r	
2020	John Petrucci	Terminal Velocity	
2020	Neal Morse	Sola Gratia	
2020	Flying Colors	Third Stage: Live in London	Recorded at Shepherd's Bush Empire in London, England, on December 14, 2019.
2020	The Neal Morse Band	The Great AdvenTour: Live in Brno 2019	Recorded at the Sono Centrum, Brno, Czech Republic on April 7, 2019.
2020	BPMD	American Made	
2020	Enuff Z'Nuff	Brainwashed Generation	Guest drums on It's All In Vain
2021	Transatlantic	The Absolute Universe	Released in three versions: The Breath of Life (Abridged Version), Forevermore (Extended Version) and Blu-Ray 5.1 Mix (Ultimate Version).
2021	Liquid Tension Experiment	Liquid Tension Experiment 3	
2021	Between the Buried and Me	Colors II	Drum solo on "Fix the Error"
2021	NMB (formerly The Neal Morse Band)	Innocence & Danger	
2021	NMB (formerly The Neal Morse Band)	Morsefest 2019	Recorded at New Life Fellowship in White House, TN.
2021	Flying Colors	Morsefest 2019	Recorded at New Life Fellowship in White House, TN.
2022	NMB (formerly The Neal Morse Band)	Morsefest 2021	Recorded at New Life Fellowship in White House, TN.
2023	NMB (formerly The Neal Morse Band)	Morsefest 2020	Recorded at New Life Fellowship in White House, TN.
2023	NMB (formerly The Neal Morse Band)	An Evening Of Innocence & Danger: Live in Hamburg	Recorded in Hamburg, Germany on June 13, 2022.
2023	The Winery Dogs	III	
2023	Transatlantic	The Final Flight: Live at L'Olympia	Recorded at L'Olympia in Paris, France on July 28, 2022.
2024	Transatlantic	Live at Morsefest 2022: The Absolute Whirlwind	Recorded at New Life Fellowship in White House, TN on April 29-30, 2022.
2024	NMB	Morsefest 2023	
2025	Dream Theater	Parasomnia	
2026	NMB (formerly The Neal Morse Band)	L.I.F.T.	

== Instructional DVD releases ==
Portnoy has released several instructional drumming videos/DVDs. These include:

- "Progressive Drum Concepts" (Rittor Music 1996, 1 VHS/DVD)
- "Liquid Drum Theater" (Hudson Music 2000, 2 DVDs)
- "Modern Drummer Festival" (Hudson Music 2003, 2 DVDs)
- "In Constant Motion" (Hudson Music 2007, 3 DVDs)
- "InstruMENTAL Inspirations" (Drum Channel 2012, 1 DVD)

== Portnoy's self filmed performances ==
Portnoy has self-released "drum-cam" DVDs and digital downloads of the last several Dream Theater and side project recording sessions as well as various live performances through his own "MP4" production company which can be found on his website. These are "in-studio" with some live recordings typically consisting of Full Band, Isolated Drums tracks, and an Audio Commentary.

- "Asian Clinic Tour" (MP4 Productions 2001, 1 DVD)
- "Ten Degrees of Turbulent Drumming" (MP4 Productions 2002, 1 DVD)
- "Drums Across Forever" (MP4 Productions 2002, 1 DVD)
- "Hammer of the Gods" (MP4 Productions 2003, 1 DVD)
- "Yellow Matter Custard – One Night in New York City" (MP4 Productions 2003, 1 DVD)
- "Drums of Thought" (MP4 Productions 2004, 1 DVD)
- "Live at Budokan" (MP4 Production 2005, 1 DVD)
- "Mike Portnoy – Drumavarium" (MP4 Productions 2005, 1 DVD)
- "Amazing Journey – One Night in New York City" (MP4 Productions 2005, 1 DVD)
- "Cygnus and the Sea Monsters – One Night in Chicago" (MP4 Productions 2005, 1 DVD)
- "sysDRUMatic chaos" (MP4 Productions 2007, 1 DVD)
- "SCORE" (MP4 Productions 2008, 1 DVD)
- "Black Clouds & Silver Drumming" (MP4 Productions 2009, 1 DVD)
- "Whirlwind Drumming" (MP4 Productions 2010, 1 DVD)
- "Yellow Matter Custard – One More Night in New York City" (MP4 Productions 2011, 1 DVD)
- "Testimony 2:Live Drum Cam" (MP4 Productions 2012, 1 DVD)
- "Drumertá" (MP4 Productions 2012, 1 DVD)
- "Drumming Colors" (MP4 Productions 2012, 1 DVD)
- "Live Momentum" (MP4 Productions 2013, 1 DVD)
- "The Drumming Dog" (MP4 Productions 2013, 1 DVD)
- "Kaleidodrums" (MP4 Productions 2014, 1 DVD)
- "Drumming Nature" (MP4 Productions 2014, 1 DVD)
- "Hot Drums" (MP4 Productions 2015, 1 DVD)
- "Metal Drumming" (MP4 Productions 2015, 1 DVD)
- "The Similitude of a Dream Live" (MP4 Productions 2017, 1 DVD)
- "The Great Adventure" (MP4 Productions 2019, 1 DVD)
- "Third Degree" (MP4 Productions 2019, 1 DVD)
- "MPMMXX" (MP4 Productions 2020, 1 DVD)
- "The Absolute Universe" (MP4 Productions 2021, 1 DVD)
- "LTE 3" (MP4 Productions 2021, 1 DVD)

== Awards and recognition ==
Modern Drummer

Portnoy won the following Modern Drummer magazine Reader's Poll awards:

1. Best Up & Coming Talent (1994)
2. Best Progressive Rock Drummer (1995–2006, 2014, 2023, 2024)
3. Best Recorded Performance (1995 for Awake, 1996 for A Change of Seasons, 1998 for Falling Into Infinity, 2000 for Metropolis Pt. 2: Scenes From a Memory, 2002 for Six Degrees of Inner Turbulence, 2007 for Score, 2011 for Nightmare (Avenged Sevenfold) and 2014 for The Winery Dogs.
4. Best Clinician (2000, 2002)
5. Best Educational Video/DVD (2000, 2002)
6. Hall of Fame Inductee (2004 - youngest living member)
7. MVP of the Year (2010, 2013)
8. Best Rock Drummer (2015)

He also is the recipient of 16 DRUM! Magazine Drummie Awards including “Drummer Of The Year” three times (2011, 2012 & 2014) and was awarded Revolver’s Golden God Award in 2011 for Drummer Of The Year.

He has released three instructional videos, "Progressive Drum Concepts", "Liquid Drum Theater", which has won awards from Modern Drummer Magazine, and his latest "In Constant Motion". He has released many "Official Bootlegs" on his website, including footage of the studio sessions for the Dream Theater albums Six Degrees of Inner Turbulence, Train of Thought, Octavarium and the Transatlantic release Bridge Across Forever. He has released bootlegs of his tribute bands Hammer of the Gods (a Led Zeppelin tribute), Yellow Matter Custard (The Beatles), Cygnus and the Sea Monsters (Rush), and Amazing Journey (The Who).

In the October 2009 issue of Rhythm Magazine, Portnoy was listed as #5 in their list of the Top 50 Drummers of All Time.

He was featured on Fuse TV's Talking Metal where he joined with Bobby Ellsworth and the show's hosts in covering Motörhead's "Overkill."

On June 14, 2010, Mike Portnoy won the Metal Hammer Golden God Award for Best Drummer.

As voted on by 6,500 drummers worldwide, Portnoy won the Drummies Award for Best Progressive Rock drummer in 2010, while Joey Jordison of Slipknot/Rob Zombie/Murderdolls won the award for Best Metal drummer.

At the Revolver Golden God Awards on April 20, 2011, he won the "Best Drummer Award" for his work with Avenged Sevenfold.

On June 7, 2011, Portnoy posted on his Facebook that he had won Drum! magazine's "Drummer of the Year Award" and the "Metal Drummer Award".

Portnoy won the "Virtuoso" award at the 2013 Progressive Music Awards.
