= Deep Water (album) =

Studio album by Cosmic Cathedral
- Released: April 25, 2025
- Genre: Progressive rock, jazz fusion, yacht rock, Christian rock
- Length: 1:20:06
- Label: Inside Out Music

Neal Morse chronology
No Hill for a Climber (w/ The Resonance) (2025)	Deep Water (2025)	Never Been Down This Road (2025)

Chester Thompson chronology
Sentient (w/ Santana) (2025)	Deep Water (2025)

Singles from Deep Water
- 1. "Introduction / Launch Out Part One" Released: February 21, 2025; 2. "Time to Fly" Released: March 27, 2025

Deep Water is the debut studio album by American progressive rock supergroup Cosmic Cathedral, released on April 25, 2025, via Inside Out.

The band consists of vocalist/guitarist Phil Keaggy (Glass Harp), vocalist/keyboardist Neal Morse (Transatlantic, Flying Colors, The Neal Morse Band, ex-Spock's Beard), bassist Byron House (Neal Morse, Robert Plant, Dolly Parton, Chris Cornell) and drummer Chester Thompson (Unitopia, ex-Genesis, ex-Frank Zappa, ex-Weather Report).

The album was released digitally and as a limited CD digipak and gatefold double LP.

Two singles were released from the album, each with an accompanying video: "Introduction / Launch Out Part One", on February 21; and "Time to Fly", on March 27.

== Background and recording ==
Vocalist/keyboardist Neal Morse knew bassist Byron House and guitarist Phil Keaggy since 2003 and 2004, respectively, when they performed in his solo albums Testimony and One. Later, when Morse went to a Steve Hackett show in Nashville, he met drummer Chester Thompson and arranged a jam session with him, during which they decided to invite more musicians, and both House and Keaggy were considered.

The band came up with its name after going through lists of suggestions by the members. Morse liked the word "cathedral" and wanted something related to the concept of eternity; "cosmic" was initially disliked by Keaggy because he had recently released an effort with that word in the title (Spinning on a Cosmic Dime, with Jeff Johnson), but he ended up accepting it.

Much of the album was developed around jam sessions, including some lyrics. Morse described the band's sound as "prog meets yacht rock meets The Beatles". Deep Water was recorded over two weeks in the middle of 2025, with Keaggy adding his parts later due to surgery.

== Themes ==
According to Morse, the concept of "deep water" mentioned in the main album suite refers to the "deep place of the spirit" and full faith in God, and the conflicts that arise from that. In an interview with Goldmine, he explained that he read a line in an old book about God saying "launch out into the deep water". According to him, "launching out into the deep water where God is was the idea, and it stayed with me. [...] I had that idea kicking around in my head for some months before Chester and I even felt like doing something together. [...] I was attracted to the idea of exploring that and really, that whole suite is about the things that keep us from launching out with God. It isn't just about launching out with God, although a lot of it is." Prog reviewer James McNair claims that it comes from a phrase used by Smith Wigglesworth to describe "a spiritual walk with God".

When asked about the lyrics being possibly both Christian and more open-ended in nature, Morse said that whenever he writes lyrics, he just "says what he feels in that moment", and that the album can get "on the nose" sometimes and not so much in other moments. McNair analyzed that "lyrically there's no ambiguity here. Deep Water’s evangelical thrust could hardly be clearer: 'Jesus came, I saw his light, He chased away the doubts of yesterday'.

== Critical reception ==
Professional ratings
Review scores
Source	Rating
Sonic Perspectives	8.9
Prog	3.5/5 stars

On Sonic Perspectives, Scott Medina considered Deep Water analogous to No Hill for a Climber, which Morse released in 2024 with The Resonance, a new band of young musicians. Of all members, he highlighted Keaggy's performance, calling his role something that "truly pays off and is one reason to keep coming back for repeat listens". On the other hand, he considered that the closing track "The Door to Heaven" "has been written many, many times over by Morse before – melodically and lyrically – [...] But the over-reliance on the form is starting, ironically, to feel like a crutch." He finished his 8.9 review by saying that the album "certainly succeeds in delivering an inspired context for these four extraordinary musicians to play together".

Writing for Prog, James McNair praised Morse and Keaggy's musicianship, although he felt "some of the more virtuosic passages just occasionally seem more like fretting-hand exercise than actual music". He also established the album as clearly religious, and wondered if there might be "a slightly more inventive way of conveying it, lyrically speaking". He called it "a reassertion of his [Morse's] faith's key tenets with like-minded friends" and concluded that "it's also a more than a decent listen, though some will feel alienated by its preaching and scattershot approach to genre".

== Track listing ==
Deep Water track listing
No.	Title	Length
1.	"The Heart of Life"	13:35
2.	"Time to Fly"	6:53
3.	"I Won’t Make It"	3:55
4.	"Walking in Daylight"	8:56
5.	"Deep Water Suite I: Introduction"	3:03
6.	"Deep Water Suite II: Launch Out, Pt. One"	4:37
7.	"Deep Water Suite III: Fires of the Sunrise"	4:04
8.	"Deep Water Suite IV: Storm Surface"	2:40
9.	"Deep Water Suite V: Nightmare in Paradise"	6:58
10.	"Deep Water Suite VI: Launch Out, Pt. Two"	1:51
11.	"Deep Water Suite VII: New Revelation"	5:15
12.	"Deep Water Suite VIII: Launch Out, Pt. Three"	1:48
13.	"Deep Water Suite IX: The Door to Heaven"	7:51
Total length:		76:16

== Charts ==
Chart (2025)	Peak position
Swiss Albums (Schweizer Hitparade)	48

== Personnel ==
Per Sonic Perspectives

- Neal Morse – vocals, keyboards
- Phil Keaggy – guitars, vocals
- Byron House – bass
- Chester Thompson – drums, percussion
- Jerry Guidroz – co-producer, audio engineering, mixing
