= No Hill for a Climber =

Studio album by Neal Morse & The Resonance
- Released: November 8, 2024
- Genre: Progressive rock
- Length: 1:07:12
- Label: Inside Out Music

Neal Morse overall chronology
The Restoration – Joseph: Part Two (solo) (2024)	No Hill for a Climber (2024)	Deep Water (w/ Cosmic Cathedral) (2025)

Singles from No Hill for a Climber
- 1. "All the Rage" Released: September 9, 2024; 2. "Thief" Released: October 9, 2024

No Hill for a Climber is the debut studio album by American progressive rock band Neal Morse & The Resonance, released on November 8, 2024, via Inside Out. The album, named after a line from Barbara Kingsolver novel Demon Copperhead, is less religious than Morse's previous output, although it still references the Bible at times. Morse compared it to the albums V and Bridge Across Forever, which he released with his previous bands Spock's Beard and Transatlantic, respectively.

Unlike with previous efforts, for this release Morse teamed up with younger, less known musicians, some of which had already worked with him in local Tennessee shows.

The album was released digitally and as a limited double album digipak (with the bonus disc consisting of instrumental versions), a standard CD jewelcase, a gatefold double LP.

Two singles were released from the album, each of them with an accompanying video: "All the Rage", on September 9; and "Thief", a month later.

On October 28, Morse released a video showing an early 2024 album writing session in which he shows the band a section of what would later be the chorus of the title song.

== Background, production and recording ==
In 2023, Neal Morse was projecting his 2024, already aware that he wasn't willing to put out another epic progressive rock album following the two Joseph releases (The Dreamer and The Restoration). Following a suggestion from his wife, he formed a band with younger musicians from his area: Andre Madatian (guitar), Chris Riley (bass) and Philip Martin (drums), whom Morse had worked with before for local Tennessee shows. He also recruited vocalist Johnny Bisaha and additional drummer Joe Ganzelli. Morse contemplated having Jon Anderson sing high vocal parts before Bisaha stepped in.

== Critical reception ==
Professional ratings
Review scores
Source	Rating
Sonic Perspectives	9.1
Metal.de	7/10
Prog	3.5/5 stars
Rock Meeting	4.5/5 stars

On Sonic Perspectives, Scott Medina called the album Morse's strongest album since Innocence & Danger, placing it even higher than Transatlantic's The Absolute Universe due to the presence of epic tracks. He praised the backing musicians, albeit conceding that Morse is still responsible for most of the songwriting, vocals and keyboards. He also commented that, while a religious album, "the faith aspect doesn't feel heavy-handed. Rather, there's more of a sense of positivity and optimism shining through, which ultimately is a welcome contrast to much of what else is out on the market today." He concluded by saying that "the combination of Morse's inspiring compositions along with the skill and fire of this younger generation ensures that we're going to be just fine in the Portnoy-less years".

Writing for Metal.de, Philipp Methling praised the new backing band and said the music on the album is "objectively good". He considered it a "solid eight-point album", but awarded it seven points nevertheless because he felt it was too reliant on concepts laid out since the development of progressive rock in the 1970s. Prog's Dave Ling also praised the backing members and the epic tracks and said the "results are suitably encouraging".

On Echoes and Dust, Zachary Nathanson praised the songs and their influences and concluded his review by saying that "there's a lot of amazing structures that are on this album. Morse has proven to show no sign of stopping. [...] No Hill for a Climber has proven to be the most majestic, orchestrated, and uplifting albums that he and The Resonance unleashed last year".

On Rock Meeting, Eric Berger called the production "top-notch" as it "beautifully showcases the virtuosity of each musician". He also praised the drummers for delivering "an elegant musical performance" without "simply following in Portnoy's footsteps". He concluded his review by saying that Morse "is full of surprises" and "offers us an album that avoids routine and introduces us to young and talented musicians".

Several The Prog Report staff members included songs from the album in their "Best Prog Songs of 2024" lists. Drummer Mike Portnoy, a frequent Neal Morse collaborator, ranked it among his ten favorite 2024 music releases.

== Track listing ==
No Hill for a Climber track listing.
No.	Title	Writer(s)	Length
1.	"Eternity in Your Eyes": I: "Prelude to Eternity" (Instrumental); II: "I See the Sun"; III: "Northern Lights"; IV: "Echoes of Forever" (Instrumental); V: "The Dream's Still Alive"; VI: "Hammer and Nail"; VII: "Daylight"	Neal Morse, Chris Riley, Andre Madatian	20:56
2.	"Thief"	Morse, Riley, Joe Ganzelli	5:22
3.	"All the Rage"	Morse	5:34
4.	"Ever Interceding"	Morse	6:31
5.	"No Hill for a Climber": I: "The Mountain and the Valley" (Instrumental); II:* "A Hill So High"; III:* "Burn It Down"; IV:* "Love is All"; V:* "The Resonance"; VI:* "The Mountaintop Beyond the Sky"	Morse, Riley, Madatian	28:49
Total length:			67:12

== Charts ==
Chart (2025)	Peak position
German Albums (Offizielle Top 100)	98
Swiss Albums (Schweizer Hitparade)	31

== Personnel ==
Per Sonic Perspectives

- Johnny Bisaha – lead vocals
- Neal Morse – lead and backing vocals (except on "Ever Interceding"), keyboards, guitars, bass, percussion
- Chris Riley – lead vocals, keyboards, guitars, bass
- Amy Pippin – backing vocals
- Julie Harrison – backing vocals
- Andre Madatian – guitars and orchestration
- Chris Carmichael – violin, viola, cello
- Chris West – trumpet, flugelhorn
- Desmond Ng – trombone, euphonium
- Philip Martin – drums on tracks 2–5
- Joe Ganzelli – drums on tracks 1, 2, 5
- Rich Mouser – mixing
