= Henry Rogers (drummer) =

English drummer (born 1991)

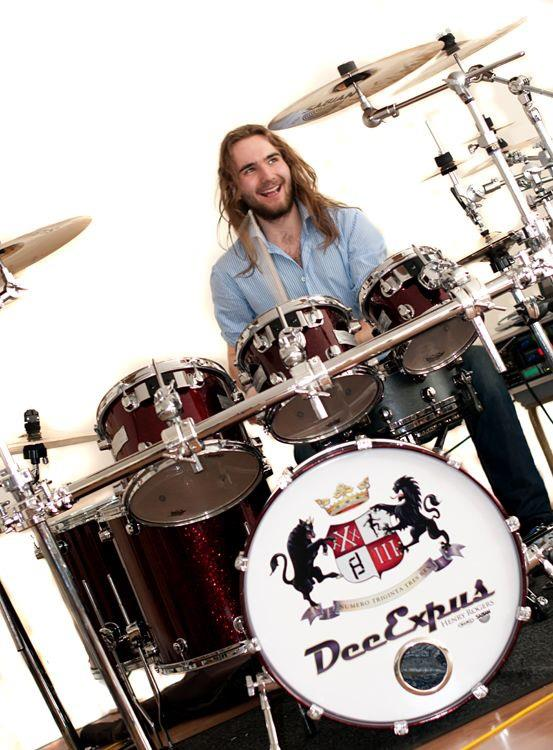

Background information
- Born: June 1991 (age 35)
- Genre: Progressive rock
- Occupation: Drummer
- Years active: 2006–present
- Website: kingofthekit.co.uk

Henry Rogers (born June 1991) is an English drummer, session artist, producer, sound developer and 2 time winner of the Classic Rock Society's award for "Drummer of the Year". He is best known for performing drums on 6 different Marillion "spinoff releases" including: 3 albums by Pete Trewavas' Edison's Children which stars Apollo 11 Astronaut Neil Armstrong's son, Rick Armstrong & On-Set Hollywood Special FX Artist Eric Blackwood and 3 albums by Marillion's Mark Kelly including 2 with DeeExpus starring Andy Ditchfield and most recently "Mark Kelly's Marathon" in 2020. Henry Rogers has been featured in 5 releases with the British progressive rock band Touchstone and in 2018 joined Mostly Autumn.

== Biography ==
Henry Rogers first got into drumming as a teenage and was tutored by a Big Band drummer who played alongside artists like Sir Paul McCartney and The Who; this is how Rogers came to adopt his style reminiscent of jazz, funk and progressive rock.

Growing up, Henry played in various local bands, including The White Orchids and The Shindiggers, around his home town of Stoke–on–Trent. He was approached by and joined Final Conflict in 2007, touring in both the UK and at festivals in Europe. During his time with the band he was awarded second place in the Best Drummer category in the annual Classic Rock Society awards.

Over the years, Rogers' has played with Touchstone, DeeExpus, Edison's Children, Puppet Rebellion, which he joined in October 2015, Mia Klose, The Daughters of Expediency, and the Heather Findlay Band. He has also played at several festivals alongside bands including High Voltage (2010), RoSFest (2010 and 2012), Download, Kendal Calling and Summer's End (2014 and 2016). Rogers also played as tour support for artists such as Marillion and Steel Panther.

His playing skills have not gone unnoticed in the music industry: coming second in the Classic Rock Society (CRS) Drummer of the Year at the age of 17 (as mentioned above), going one better and winning CRS Drummer of the Year two years running (2012 and 2013), being voted 9th Best Drummer (2012), 7th Best Drummer (2013) and 10th Best Drummer (2016) by Prog magazine readers alongside well–known established drummers including Ian Mosley, Neil Peart and Gavin Harrison; He was also listed in the July 2015 issue of Rhythm magazine as one of the 20 most influential prog drummers of the millennium.

Alongside his work with other musicians such as Alan Reed (Pallas) and with Alan's live band The Daughters of Expediency, Morpheus Rising and Edison's Children (a project set up by Pete Trewavas and Eric Blackwood featuring Rick Armstrong, the son of the 1st Man on the Moon Neil Armstrong). He is also a well–known session musician (for both live and studio work), regularly working with established musicians both in the UK and from around the globe. He was also recently invited to play with Guy Manning's Damanek, at Summer's End 2016.

Rogers spends a great deal of his time writing and recording for various artists and projects from around the globe in his purpose-built recording studio in Cheshire, including working with Roland on their advertising campaign for their TM-1 Trigger Module.

== Current kit and set–up ==
Full Kit: DW White Marine Pearl

- Rack toms: 8” 10” 12” (8x7 10x8 12x9)
- Floor toms: 14" 16” (14x12 16x14)
- Kick drum: 22" (22x18)
- Snare: collector’s series (14x51/2)
- Sabian Cymbals
- Crashes: 16” 17” 18” AAX V-Crash
- Ride: 20” AAX Studio ride
- China: 20” HHX Zen China, 12” AAX mini china, 16” AAX china
- Splashes: 6” AAX splashes x2, 10” o-zone x1
- Hi-Hat: 13” HHX Evolution Hats

Small Kit: DW Black Velvet

- Rack Toms: 10” (10x8)
- Floor toms: 14" 16” (14x12 16x14)
- Kick drum: 22" (22x18)
- Snare: collector’s series (14x51/2)
- Sabian Cymbals
- Crashes: 16” 18” AAX V-Crash
- Ride: 20” AAX Studio ride
- China: 20” HHX Zen China
- Hi-Hat: 13” HHX Evolution Hats

Skins

- White Marine Pearl - REMO Coated Ambassadors on toms, REMO Coated Ambassador X on snare, REMO Powerstroke Pro on kick
- Black Velvet - REMO Pinstripe on toms, REMO Ambassador X on snare, REMO Powerstroke Pro on kick

Sticks

- Los Cabos 5A Intense Signature Henry Rogers

Drum Stool

- Porter & Davies BC2

Cases

- Protection Racket Drum cases

Electronic Recording

- Roland and XLN Audio Addictive Drums 2

Hardware

- DW9000 (pedals, hi-hat and cymbal stands)

== Discography ==
Year	Band	Title	Label	Notes
2007	The White Orchids	Runaway		EP
2009	Final Conflict	Another Moment in Time	Metal Mind Productions	DVD, filmed in Poland
2011	Touchstone	The City Sleeps	Steamhammer	Reached number 36 in the UK Rock Album chart
2011	DeeExpus	King of Number 33	EDEL	
2011	Nerve Toy Trio	The Hard Cell	Burning Shed	EP
2012	Final Conflict	Return of the Artisan	Gaolhouse Music	
2013	Shineback	Rise Up Forgotten, Return Destroyed	Bad Elephant Music	Guest appearance on title track
2013	Touchstone	Oceans of Time	Cherry Red	Reached number 24 in the BBC Official rock charts
2013	Edison's Children	The Final Breath Before November	Random Disturbance Records	
2014	Touchstone	Oceans EP	Touchstone Music	EP, Limited edition - 500 copies only
2014	Mia Klose	Living For Love		
2014	Touchstone	Live Inside Outside	Touchstone Music	DVD
2015	Edison's Children	Somewhere Between Here and There	Random Disturbance Records	
2016	Heel	The Parts We Save		
2016	Puppet Rebellion	Fragments		Single only
2016	Puppet Rebellion	The Pact		Single only
2016	Touchstone	Lights From The Sky		EP
2016	Heather Findlay Band	I Am Snow		
2017	Puppet Rebellion	Chemical Friends	Elysha	
2018	Mostly Autumn	White Rainbow	Mostly Autumn Records	
2019	Edison's Children	The Disturbance Fields	Random Disturbance Records	
