= Martin Hudson =

Martin Hudson may refer to:

- Martin Hudson, character in 8 Seconds
- Martin Hudson (political candidate) for Broxbourne (UK Parliament constituency)
- Martin Hudson, of the Classic Rock Society
