= Cover to Cover (Morse, Portnoy and George album) =

Studio album by Morse Portnoy George
- Released: August 25, 2006
- Recorded: 2003, 2004, 2005
- Genres: Progressive rock, hard rock
- Length: 63:08
- Labels: Radiant, Metal Blade, InsideOut

Professional ratings
Review scores
Source	Rating
AllMusic	2.5/5 stars

Cover to Cover is a studio album of cover songs recorded by Neal Morse, Mike Portnoy and bassist Randy George during the recording of the albums Testimony (2003), One (2004) and ? (2005) by Neal Morse. Most of these songs have previously been released on special editions of those albums. Released in 2006.

== Track listing ==
From the ? (2005) sessions
No.	Title	Writer(s)	Original artist	Length
1.	"Pleasant Valley Sunday"	Gerry Goffin, Carole King	The Monkees	4:44
2.	"Badge"	Eric Clapton, George Harrison	Cream	2:51
3.	"Maybe I'm Amazed"	Paul McCartney	Paul McCartney	4:03
4.	"Where Do the Children Play?"	Cat Stevens	Cat Stevens	4:40
5.	"I'm the Man"	Joe Jackson	Joe Jackson	4:05
6.	"Feelin' Stronger Every Day"	Peter Cetera, James Pankow	Chicago	5:39
7.	"Rock and Roll Suicide"	David Bowie	David Bowie	3:28

From the One (2004) sessions
No.	Title	Writer(s)	Original artist	Length
8.	"Where the Streets Have No Name"	U2, Bono	U2	5:47
9.	"Day After Day"	Pete Ham	Badfinger	3:26
10.	"What is Life?"	George Harrison	George Harrison	4:28
11.	"I'm Free/Sparks"	Pete Townshend	The Who	6:36

From the Testimony (2003) sessions
No.	Title	Writer(s)	Original artist	Length
12.	"Tuesday Afternoon"	Justin Hayward	The Moody Blues	6:32
13.	"Can't Find My Way Home"	Steve Winwood	Blind Faith	6:49

== Personnel ==
- Chris Carmichael - violin, cello, viola
- Randy George - bass
- Jerry Guidroz - engineer, mixing
- Jim Hoke - saxophone
- Bill Hubauer - trombone
- Phil Keaggy - vocals
- Ken Love - mastering
- Neal Morse - guitar, keyboards, vocals, producer, mixing
- Rich Mouser - mixing
- Joey Pippin - graphic design, photography
- Mike Portnoy - drums, liner notes
- Neal Rosengarden - trumpet
