= Edison's Children =

Progressive rock band

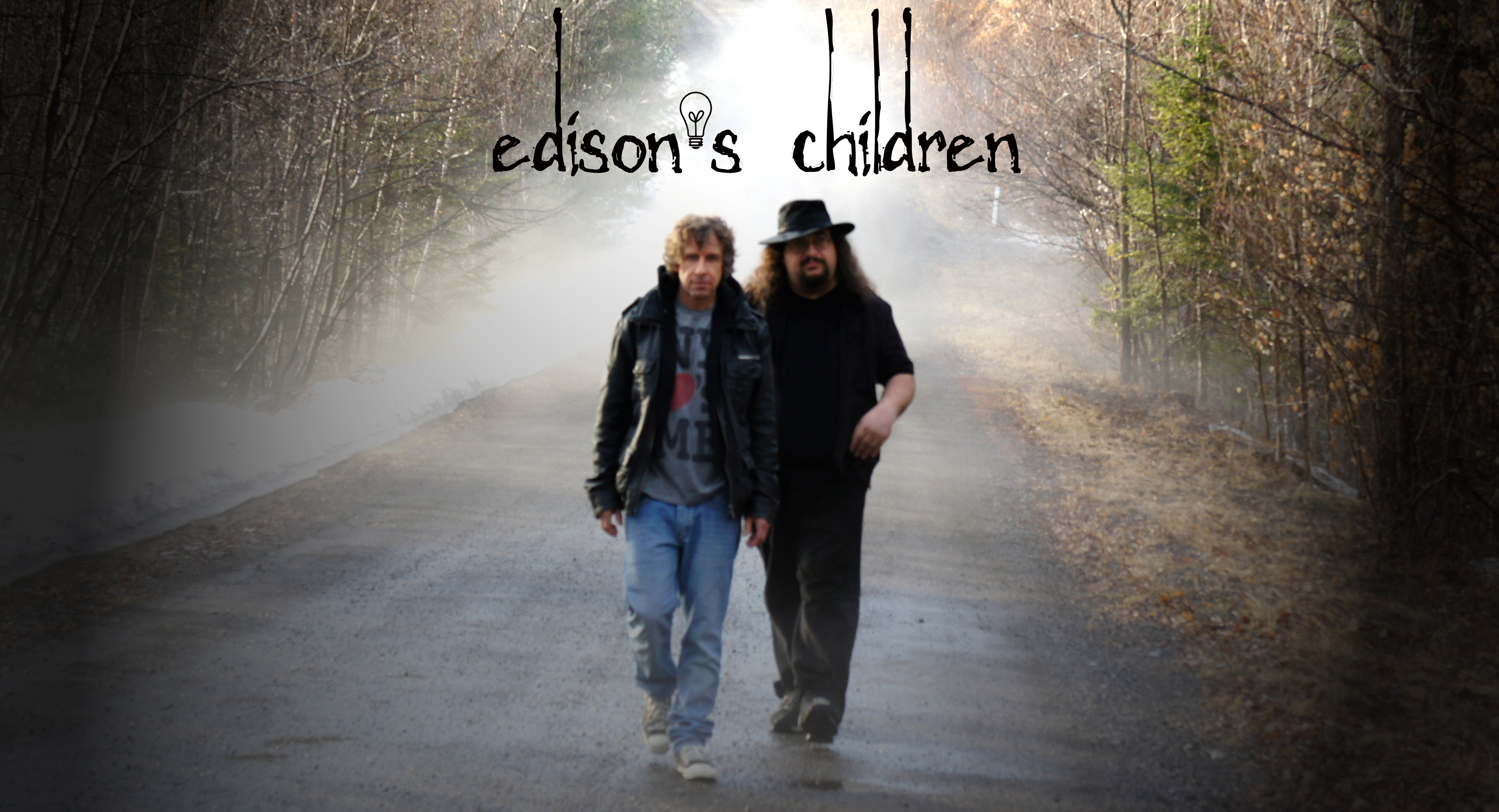
- Edison’s Children 2011, Pete Trewavas and Eric Blackwood

Background information
- Origin: Aylesbury, Buckinghamshire, England; Sugar Loaf, New York, United States
- Genres: Progressive rock, neo-prog, alternative rock, psychedelic rock, post-industrial, space rock
- Years active: 2011–present
- Labels: Random Disturbance Records, Racket Records
- Spinoffs: Marillion, Transatlantic, Kino
- Members: Pete Trewavas; Eric Blackwood; Rick Armstrong; Featuring: Henry Rogers; Lisa Wetton
- Website: edisonschildren.com

Edison's Children is a science fiction-oriented progressive rock trio known for writing "epic Concept albums" with supernatural, apocalyptic and extra-terrestrial themes. It features Rick Armstrong (the son of astronaut Neil Armstrong), Pete Trewavas (Marillion and Transatlantic) and Eric Blackwood (on-set special FX artist for over 150 Major Motion Pictures & Television Shows (IATSE Local 52) who performed as a musician for Sunblister & Blackwood and Foti). Their CDs include visual accompaniments in the form of 20 page "lyrics and images" insert booklets by photographer Wendy Darling Blackwood.

Edison's Children's music is a blend of neo-prog and industrial rock, drawing progressive influences from Pink Floyd, Marillion, Porcupine Tree, Genesis, and Rush and combining them with the sub-bass style of music by bands like Tool, Deftones, The Cure, Chevelle, Puscifer and A Perfect Circle, due to Blackwood's work as a 5-string (Low-B) bassist with NYC's hard industrial alt-rockers Sunblister (1998-2005). With Trewavas' experiences with Marillion and Transatlantic, Rick Armstrong's influences serving on panels about space and the universe, and Blackwood's history in Hollywood and appreciation for the modern darker scoring of Max Richter, Clint Mansell and Carter Burwell, Edison's Children combined influences to create "epic concept albums" based on extraterrestrial, supernatural, and apocalyptical themes, many of which Blackwood claims to have "personally experienced" in his life.

Edison's Children is an official side-project of the rock band Marillion, who began in 1979 and have sold over 15 million albums worldwide. Edison's Children's first album In the Last Waking Moments... features all of the members of Marillion.

== History ==
Between 2007 and 2013, Pete Trewavas and Eric Blackwood, with help from Rick Armstrong, wrote approximately seven albums. The first album, In The Last Waking Moments…, came out in 2011. The single from that album, "A Million Miles Away (I Wish I Had A Time Machine)", was released in June 2012, reached the FMQB Top 40 for 10 weeks. On 18 October 2012, the song peaked as the 32nd most played song on commercial radio in the United States. The album features all the members of Marillion (Steve Hogarth, Mark Kelly, Ian Mosley, Steve Rothery, and Pete Trewavas; former lead singer Fish's lead guitarist also appears on it.)

Edison's Children's albums were written and recorded around Trewavas' recording and touring sessions with Transatlantic and Marillion, during seven major sessions from March 2010 until February 2013. These sessions include one in March 2011 at Saint-Sauveur, Quebec, another at Le Chateau in Montreal, Quebec in the weeks before and after the Marillion Montreal Convention of 2011, in August 2011 at two separate beach houses in Ocean City, Maryland and at Black Dirt Studios in Sugar Loaf, New York, a space leased from Phish founder Brad Morrison, between the Atlantic and European legs of Transatlantic's Whirlwind Tour.

Edison's Children opened for Marillion's show "Brave" at the Marillion Weekends in Port Zélande, Netherlands; Montreal, Quebec; and Wolverhampton, England, from March to April 2013. They also played their own two-hour show in Montreal. All three shows were recorded, and the Montreal show was released on In The Last Waking Moments....

Their second album, The Final Breath Before November, was a concept album written in 2012 and released on 1 January 2014 featuring Trewavas, Blackwood and Henry Rogers on drums. It features three songs and is 79:28 long. The band supported the album live with Armstrong on guitar, bass and keyboards; Lisa Wetton on drums and percussion; and Rogers. The album had an "edge of midnight on Halloween" theme, which provided a dark canvas and a step away from their more commercial-sounding first album. The album also showcased DeeExpus, who at nineteen had won the Classic Rock Society's World's Best Drummer Award two years in a row, beating out Dream Theater/Transatlantic's Mike Portnoy.

On 1 August 2015, the group released their third album, Somewhere Between Here And There, featuring Chris Mack and Rogers (drums), Wendy "Darling" Farell-Pastore (backing vocals), and Armstrong (lead synth guitar).

After Somewhere Between Here and There, the band went on hiatus due to Blackwood's health issues, including arm and shoulder injuries from work as a special effects technician and a bout with Lyme disease, which left him unable to walk and connected to an IV for over a year. Although Blackwood had stepped away from recording and concert activity, Armstrong continued with Blackwood's work on Somewhere Between Here and There, and with the band's extensive back catalog that Trewavas and Blackwood wrote during sessions for In The Last Waking Moments... and Final Breath Before November.

Edison's Children released their fourth, 68-minute long album, The Disturbance Fields, on 20 July 2019, the fiftieth anniversary of Apollo 11 and Neil Armstrong's landing on the Moon. Neil Armstrong's concert celebration of the Apollo 11 Moon landing (with the Alan Parsons Project) brought the band out of retirement with John Wesley and Mark Prator (both previously playing in Porcupine Tree) joining Armstrong, Trewavas, Blackwood and Wetton together on stage for the first time in seven years.

A double-LP 180g vinyl release of The Disturbance Fields was officially released on 23 October 2019, re-mastered by Andy VanDette, chief mastering engineer of Masterdisc, known for remastering Rush's back catalog - along with Porcupine Tree, Metallica (One), Aerosmith (Living on the Edge), Nirvana, Paul McCartney, David Bowie, Muse, Alicia Keys and many others.

The Disturbance Fields is an ecological album. Its lyrics are about the overuse of the earth's resources leading to a battle with "Mother Nature" to take back the earth from human nature. Trewavas has stated:

The Disturbance fields are the physical manifestations that mother nature's wrath can take against the human race due to our mistreatment of the oceans, rainforests, and overdevelopment of urban landmasses; this has resulted in dramatic climatic changes in the temperatures of the earth and the sea and is the cause of far more substantial and more violent storms and destructive natural events. "[The album] is a 68-minute epic piece of music that takes you on a journey of a man fighting all of the forces of Mother Nature's wrath. It is also personally based on the fact that during these recording sessions of Edison's Children's current and upcoming albums, they were hit by a hurricane, a 6.0 earthquake, a tornado, and a massive blizzard which caused a state of emergency. Having experienced firsthand much of what Mother Nature's wrath can deliver... It was natural for the band to write a concept that maybe... We've crossed that line, and perhaps Mother Nature has come to purge the world of what has become its biggest liability... human nature.

As of 2019 Edison's Children have released four albums, two EPs, and one "making of" release. Every song has an accompanying corresponding piece of vivid imagery by photographer, album cover artist, and backing vocalist Wendy Darling Blackwood in its album's 20 page Lyrics and Images booklet. Blackwood also photographed the album covers of all of their official releases, including Rick Armstrong's solo material.

== Lineup ==
The trio of Trewavas, Blackwood and Armstrong share lead, rhythm and synth guitar duty, symphonic programming and bass. Eric Blackwood is the main lead vocalist with Pete Trewavas also taking on about 20% of the lead singing duties. Drums are shared by Henry Rogers (who played in Touchstone, Mostly Autumn and DeeExpus) and Lisa Wetton, the wife of late Asia and King Crimson singer John Wetton. Iluvatar's Chris Mack and Marillion's Ian Mosley have appeared in guest spots. Any electronic or programmed drum tracks are written and performed by Pete Trewavas.

Mixing and mastering engineers include Marillion producer Mike Hunter; John Mitchell, the singer of Arena, Kino, Frost*, It Bites and Lonely Robot; King Crimson lead singer Jakko Jakszyk; and Fish, Howard Jones and the guitarist Robin Boult. The band's third concept album and fourth album overall "The Disturbance Fields" was remastered for 180g LP and CD before its release by the former lead master technician of Masterdisc Andy VanDette known for remastering all of Rush and Porcupine Tree releases, as well as that of David Bowie.

Every Edison's Children's concept album features corresponding artwork in the form of an interior 20 page "lyrics and images" booklet in which every individual song receives its own "album cover" starring the vivid imagery of Wendy Farrell-Pastore a.k.a. Wendy "Darling" Blackwood, who also does backing vocals for the band.

Current line-up:

- Pete Trewavas – basses, lead and backing vocals, lead and rhythm guitars, samples and effects, drum programming, VST programming, keyboards, orchestration
- Eric Blackwood – lead and backing vocals, lead and rhythm guitars, bass, keyboards, drum programming, orchestration
- Rick Armstrong– synth guitar / Rickenbacker Bass / lead and rhythm guitars / synthesizers

Drums:

- Henry Rogers – drums and percussion
- Dan Hogarth - Guest (drummer) "The Day After" from the album "A Light In Ethereal Night"
- Lisa Wetton – wife of the late John Wetton, lead singer of Asia/King Crimson

== Guest members ==
- Steve Hogarth (also known as "h") – vocals – "The Awakening"
- Steve Rothery – electric lead guitars – "Spiraling"
- Mark Kelly – vocals – "The Awakening", keyboards – "The "Other" Other Dimension"
- Ian Mosley – drums – "The Awakening"
- Robin Boult – backing power rhythm guitar – "In The Last Waking Moments..." / Lead Guitar "The Day After"
- Andy Ditchfield – vocals – "The Awakening"
- Wendy "Darling" Blackwood – backing vocals – "The Final Breath Before November" and "Where Were You (Jakko's "Whisper Ending Mix")" and all official artwork/photography
- Chris Mack – drums (from Iluvatar and drummer for the NFL's Baltimore Ravens' home halftime shows)

== Live band members ==
Edison's Children's live band is made up of:

- Pete Trewavas – lead guitar, backing vocals, keyboards, bass
- Eric Blackwood – lead vocals, lead synth guitar
- Rick Armstrong – rhythm guitar, keyboards, bass - son of astronaut Neil Armstrong
- Lisa Wetton – percussion, backing vocals, drums - wife of late Asia and King Crimson lead singer John Wetton
- John Wesley – guitars - from Porcupine Tree
- Mark Prator – drums - drummer for Iced Earth/Steven Wilson
- Anna Koropchak – violin from Apothocary
- Dean Morekas – bass from Iluvatar
- Chris Mack – drums from Iluvatar
- Henry Rogers – drums for DeeExpus/Touchstone/Mostly Autumn
- Dennis Mullin – guitar from Iluvatar
- Mike Gusway – bass from 4 Block Empire

== Discography ==
- 2011 – In The Last Waking Moments…
- 2014 – The Final Breath Before November…
- 2015 – Somewhere Between Here and There
- 2019 – The Disturbance Fields
- 2026 - A Light In Ethereal Night

== Mixdown & Mastering ==
- Mike Hunter – Mixdown of Dusk, Fracture, Fallout (Of The 2nd Kind), Outerspaced, Spiraling, The "Other" Other Dimension, Across The Plains, Lifeline, Fallout (Of The 3rd Kind), The Awakening
- Robin Boult – Mixdown of "In the First Waking Moments…", "A Million Miles Away (I Wish I Had A Time Machine)","In The Last Waking Moments…", "Fallout (Of The 4th Kind)
- Mike Hunter – Mastering
- John Mitchell – Mastering track 5 on "Somewhere Between Here And There"
- Jakko Jakszyk - Current Lead singer of King Crimson – Mixdown of tracks 8, 11, 14 on Somewhere Between Here And There
- Andy VanDette - Remastering of The Disturbance Field 180g Double Vinyl / CD / Digital releases
