= Eric Blackwood (musician) =

American singer-songwriter

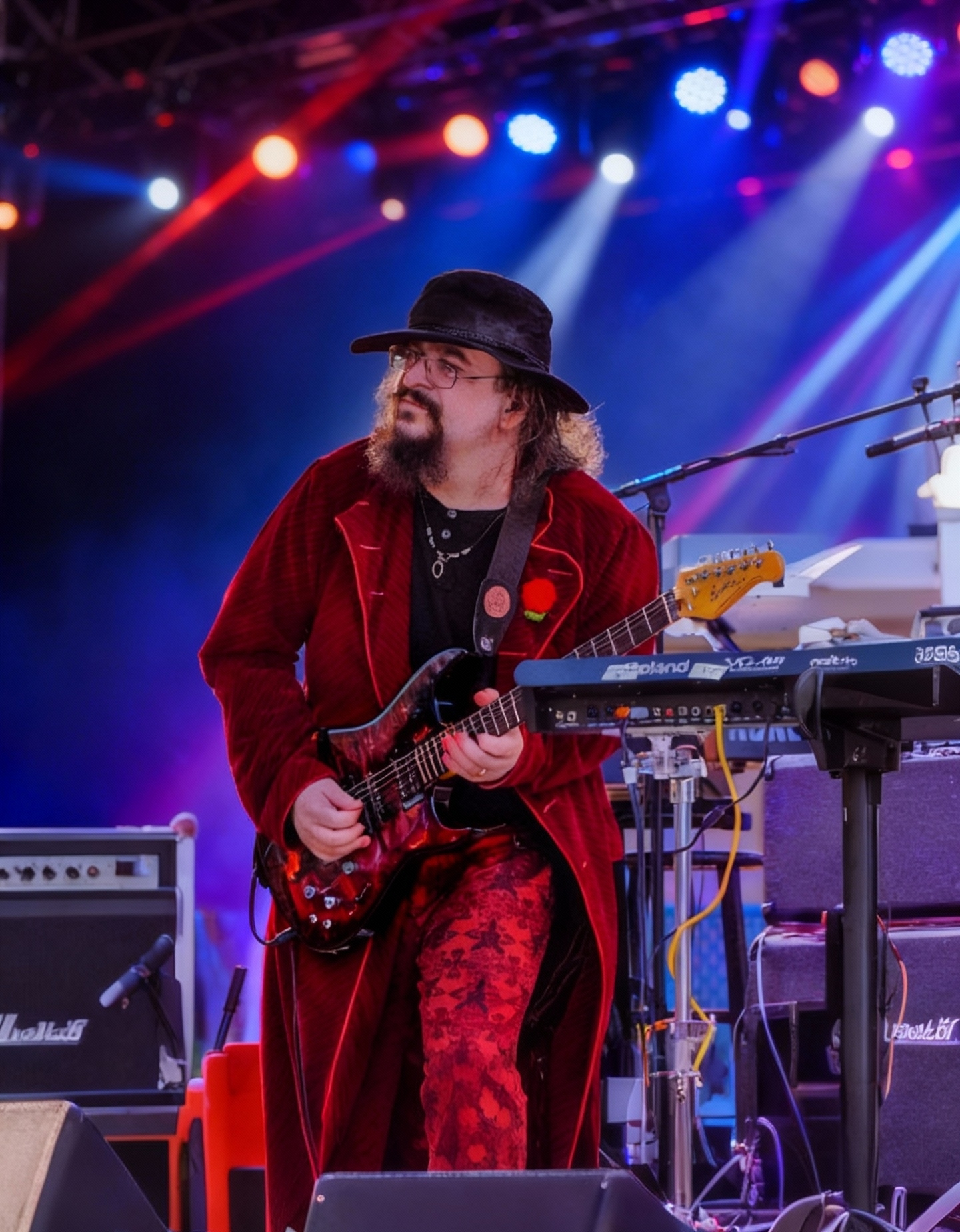
- Blackwood with Neil Armstrong's son Rick Armstrong and Pete Trewavas of Marillion at the 2019 NASA 50th Celebration of Apollo 11.

Background information
- Born: Eric Pastore; July 24, 1968 (age 58); Brooklyn, New York, United States
- Genres: Neo-prog; progressive rock; hard rock
- Occupations: Singer-songwriter, musician, author, special fx technician, property technician, photographer
- Instruments: Vocals, guitar, keyboards, bass
- Years active: 1982–present
- Labels: Random Disturbance Records, Wreckords Records, Racket Records, Thunder Bay Press, Baker & Taylor
- Website: www.edisonschildren.bandcamp.com, www.digitalballparks.com

Eric Blackwood (born Eric Pastore) is an American singer-songwriter and guitarist, known for being a member of the progressive rock band Edison's Children, which also features Marillion's Pete Trewavas and Rick Armstrong, the son of astronaut Neil Armstrong. He is also a special effects and property technician certified by the International Alliance of Theatrical Stage Employees who has worked on more than 100 major motion pictures and in television, an author, baseball stadium photographer, and historian, and has been an honorary member of the Marillion touring crew since 2005.

== Early life ==
Blackwood was born in Brooklyn, New York, on July 24, 1968, the youngest of four siblings. He was raised in the Great Kills neighborhood of Staten Island, and graduated from New Dorp High School in 1986. Among his siblings are musician Sonny Pastore (of the band The Reluctant Reasons) and actor Garry Pastore He is also a cousin of actor Vincent Pastore.

== Early career ==
After graduating Pace University in 1991 with a Bachelor of Science, Blackwood began his career performing information technology support at the WWOR-TV superstation in Secaucus New Jersey, supporting The Howard Stern Show - Episodic TV Program, the New York Mets "Channel 9" broadcasting team and their in-house talk show People Are Talking where Blackwood's band "Blackwood & Foti" was invited to perform "Through The Ages" live on air, his first nationwide television performance.

Pete Trewavas (of Marillion and Transatlantic) formed the progressive rock duo Edison's Children in 2008, and recorded the album In The Last Waking Moments..., released on 11 November 2011, by Random Disturbance Records, and distributed in Europe by Marillion's Racket Records. It spawned the U.S commercial radio Top 40 hit "A Million Miles Away (I Wish I Had A Time Machine)" on the FMQB Hot A/C Commercial Radio Charts on 18 September 2012, and remaining in the Top 40 for ten straight weeks, returning to its peak position at number 32 on 12 October 2012. In 2013 they released a second album, The Final Breath Before November, featuring drummer Henry Rogers. Rick Armstrong, the son of Neil Armstrong, joined Edison's Children as a synth guitarist, lead guitarist and bassist in Montreal in 2011. He stayed on as a permanent member, finishing up their third album, Somewhere Between Here and There, which included new mixes by King Crimson's Jakko Jakszyk of songs from The Final Breath Before November.

The song "At Night", penned during Blackwood's previous effort Blackwood and Foti and remixed by the band Closenuf, has received an Official Grammy Ballot Placement.

Blackwood collaborated with Trewavas on more than a hundred songs for films and for Edison's Children between 2008 and 2012, but stopped recording and performing in 2013 after an injury he suffered while working on James Gandolfini's final film left him disabled. He also contracted Lyme disease, for which he was treated with intravenous therapy for over a year. Edison's Children has been on hiatus ever since, though Armstrong is working with Edison's Children's back catalog for future releases.

Blackwood is the webmaster and photographer of the website Digitalballparks.com, and has authored and photographed for the top-selling book 500 Ballparks (Thunder Bay Press, Baker & Taylor) with his wife, photographer Wendy Farrell.

== Discography ==
Year	Band Name	Album Title	Instrumentation	Record Company
2023	Rick Armstrong	Chromosphere	Synth Guitar on "Spheres of Influence"	Random Disturbance
2019	Edison's Children	The Disturbance Fields	Vox • Guitar • Synth Gtr • Bass • Composer	Random Disturbance
2019	Edison's Children	The Disturbance Fields (Double 180g Vinyl)	Vox • Guitar • Synth Gtr • Bass • Composer	Random Disturbance
2015	Edison's Children	Somewhere Between Here and There	Vox • Guitar • Synth Gtr • Bass • Composer	Random Disturbance
2015	Anthony J. Foti & Closenuf	"In The Eyes Of The Rose - The EP"	Acoustic Guitar on "In The Eyes of The Rose" *Produced by Steve Jerome Mix	Wreckords Records
2014	Edison's Children / Marillion	DeStressed (Soundtrack)	Vox • Guitar • Synth Gtr • Bass • Composer	WillowCreek Ent
2013	Edison's Children	The Final Breath Before November	Vox • Guitar • Synth Gtr • Bass • Composer	Random Disturbance
2012	Edison's Children	"In The Last Waking Moments (EP)	Vox • Guitar • Synth Gtr • Bass • Composer	Random Disturbance
2012	Edison's Children w - Iluvatar	"Live @ The Strand” (For Hurricane Sandy)	Vocals • Guitar	Random Disturbance
2012	Closenuf	"...To Our Universe	co-composer on "Buy The Boat" • Acoustic Guitar "In The Eyes of the Rose"	Wreckords Records
2012	Edison's Children	"In The First Waking Moments” (Making Of ITLWM)	Vox • Guitar • Synth Gtr • Bass • Composer	Random Disturbance
2011	Edison's Children	"A Million Miles Away (I Wish I Had A Time Machine)” (EP)	Vox • Guitar • Synth Gtr • Bass • Composer	Random Disturbance
2011	Edison's Children	"In The Last Waking Moments”	Vox • Guitar • Synth Gtr • Bass • Composer	Random Disturbance
2011	Edison's Children	"Dusk” (Pre-Album released Single)	Vox • Guitar • Synth Gtr • Bass • Composer	Random Disturbance
2009	Closenuf	...To A New Beginning	co-composer on "Airline Bags & Luggage Tags", "At Night", "She's Leaving", "Buy The Boat", "Music Man" • Rhythm Guitar & Backing Vox "At Night (Al Pitrelli Mix)" • Acoustic Guitar "In The Eyes of the Rose (Jerome Mix)"	Wreckords Records
2005	Closenuf	Closenuf	co-composer on "At Night", "Buy The Boat", "Music Man" / Rhythm Guitar & Backing Vox "At Night / Acoustic Guitar "In The Eyes of the Rose"	Wreckords Records
2000	Eric Blackwood & The Alley Cats	"Growing Down In Brooklyn" (Soundtrack)	Co-composer • Vocals • Guitar • Co-Producer • Music Director	Avenue H Productions
1999	Sunblister	”Approaching Indignation” (2nd Album)	Bass	Louis Diluzio Esq.
1997	Sunblister	”Simantik” (1st Album)	Bass	Louis Diluzio Esq.
1996	Anthony J. Foti	”Fourward”	Co-composer/Guitar/Backing Vox "At Night" • Acoustic Guitar "In The Eyes of the Rose"	Wreckords Records
1992	Blackwood & Foti	”Haunted Memories”	Vox • Guitar • Co-Composer	Wreckords Records
1991	Blackwood & Foti	"Through The Ages"	Co-composer • Vocals • Guitar • Orchestration	Eve Nelson Esq

=== Compilation Appearances ===
Year	Compilation	Band	Song	Instrumentation	Production						
Year	Compilation	Band	Song	Instrumentation	Production	2019	"PROG - Lifting Shadows Of A Dream P105"	Edison's Children	"The Tempest"	Vocals • Lead Guitar • Synth Guitar • Bass • Co-Conmposer & Co-Producer	PROG! Magazine Sampler #105 ROP101CD-08-19
2016	"PROG - Dance Of The Dawn P49"	Edison's Children	"Welcome To Your Nightmares"	Vocals • Lead Guitar • Synth Guitar • Bass • Co-Conmposer & Co-Producer	PROG! Magazine Sampler #49 ROP71CD-11-04						
2016	"PROG - Dance Of The Dawn P49"	Edison's Children	"Silence Can Be Deafening"	Vocals • Lead Guitar • Synth Guitar • Bass • Co-Conmposer & Co-Producer	PROG! Magazine Sampler #49 ROP71CD-11-04						
2015	"PROG - Fantastic Voyage P40	Edison's Children	"Where Were You (Jakko's Mix)"	Vocals • Lead Guitar • Synth Guitar • Bass • Co-Conmposer / Mixed by Jakko Jakszyk of King Crimson	PROG! Magazine Sampler P40 / ROP62CD-12-15						
2015	"Voices For Hospice"	Edison's Children	"Haunted Memories"	Vocals • Lead Guitar • Synth Guitar • Bass • Co-Conmposer & Co-Producer	Steve Hackett & Hats off Gentlemen, It's Adequate / Charity for Hospice Organizations						
2015	"PROG - Resiste 77"	Edison's Children	"I Am Haunted"	Vocals • Lead Guitar • Synth Guitar • Bass • Co-Conmposer & Co-Producer	PROG! Magazine Sampler #77						
2015	"PROG - Resiste 77"	Edison's Children	"The Morphlux"	Vocals • Lead Guitar • Synth Guitar • Bass • Co-Conmposer & Co-Producer	PROG! Magazine Sampler #77						
2012	"PROG - A Wilderness of Mirrors P22"	Edison's Children	"Seventh Sign (Single Edit)"	Vocals • Lead Guitar • Synth Guitar • Bass • Co-Composer & Co-Producer	PROG! Magazine Sampler ROP44CD-03-14						
2012	Marillion "Playing Away"	Edison's Children	"The Awakening"	Vocals • Lead Guitar • Synth Guitar • Bass • Co-Composer & Co-Producer	Compilation of Marillion's Side Projects (RACKET46)						
2012	"PROG - Suits You Sir P4"	Edison's Children	"Fracture"	Vocals • Lead Guitar • Synth Guitar • Bass • Co-Composer & Co-Producer	PROG! Magazine Sampler CD #4						

== Feature films ==
As a special effects technician, on-set property technician and/or set dresser unless otherwise specified:

- Spider-Man 3
- American Gangster
- Bourne Ultimatum
- The Adjustment Bureau
- I Am Legend
- Men in Black 3
- What Happens in Vegas
- Baby Mama
- Salt
- Wanted
- Percy Jackson and The Olympians: The Lightning Thief
- Friends With Benefits
- Violet and Daisy
- The Drop
- The Back-up Plan
- Sherlock Holmes
- Cop Out
- Julie and Julia
- For One More Day
- World Trade Center
- The Wrestler
- Black Swan
- The Taking of Pelham 1-2-3
- The Other Guys
- August Rush
- Mr. Popper's Penguins
- Perfect Stranger
- Assassination of a High School President
- A Walk Among The Tombstones
- The Hoax
- The Rebound

== Television ==
As a special effects technician, on-set property technician and/or set dresser unless otherwise specified:

- Person of Interest
- Boardwalk Empire
- Rescue Me
- 30 Rock
- Smash
- Law and Order: SVU
- Law and Order: Criminal Intent
- Law and Order: Trial By Jury
- CSI: NY
- Kings
- White Collar
- America's Next Top Model
- New Amsterdam
- Ugly Betty

== Consultant ==
- 42: The Jackie Robinson Story (baseball stadium expert and locations advisor)

== Music Director ==
- DeStressed
- Growing Down in Brooklyn
