= Whirld Tour 2010: Live in London =

Live album by Transatlantic
- Released: October 26, 2010
- Recorded: May 21, 2010
- Venue: Shepherd's Bush Empire (London)
- Genre: Progressive rock
- Length: 183:25
- Label: InsideOut

Transatlantic chronology
| The Whirlwind (2009) | Whirld Tour 2010: Live in London (2010) | Kaleidoscope (2014) |

Whirld Tour 2010: Live in London is the third live album by the progressive rock supergroup Transatlantic. Released in 2010, it documents the May 21, 2010, show by the band at Shepherd's Bush Empire, London, England. The show was also filmed and released on a two-DVD set with additional performances (including a cover of the Genesis song "The Return of the Giant Hogweed" with Steve Hackett) and documentary footage. This was the second-to-last show of the "Whirld Tour" (not counting their appearance at The High Voltage Festival) in support of the band's third studio album, The Whirlwind.

Daniel Gildenlöw of Pain of Salvation returns this tour, playing additional keyboards, guitars, percussion, and vocals throughout the show.

Like their previous live albums, this set features 6 songs, however because of the amount of material the band had thus far, no cover songs are featured (although bits of covers are scattered throughout the show, including Deep Purple's "Highway Star", Santana's "Soul Sacrifice", and even the McDonald's theme).

== Track listing ==
All songs by Neal Morse/Roine Stolt/Mike Portnoy/Pete Trewavas unless otherwise noted.

Disc one
| No. | Title | Length |
|---|---|---|
| 1. | "The Whirlwind": "I. Overture / Whirlwind"; "II. The Wind Blew Them All Away"; "III. On the Prowl"; "IV. A Man Can Feel"; "V. Out of the Night"; "VI. Rose Colored Glasses"; "VII. Evermore"; "VIII. Set Us Free"; "IX. Lay Down Your Life"; "X. Pieces of Heaven"; "XI. Is It Really Happening?"; "XII. Dancing with Eternal Glory / Whirlwind (Reprise)" | 79:52 |
| Total length: | | 79:52 |

Disc two
| No. | Title | Length |
|---|---|---|
| 1. | "All of the Above": "I. Full Moon Rising"; "II. October Winds"; "III. Camouflaged in Blue"; "IV. Half Alive"; "V. Undying Love"; "VI. "Full Moon Rising (Reprise)" | 30:19 |
| 2. | "We All Need Some Light" (Morse) | 8:40 |
| 3. | "Duel with the Devil": "I. Motherless Children"; "II. Walk Away"; "III. Silence of the Night"; "IV. You're Not Alone"; "V. Almost Home" | 28:31 |
| Total length: | | 67:30 |

Disc three
| No. | Title | Length |
|---|---|---|
| 1. | "Bridge Across Forever" (Morse/Prince) | 6:03 |
| 2. | "Stranger in Your Soul": "I. Sleeping Wide Awake"; "II. Hanging in the Balance"; "III. Lost and Found Pt. 2"; "IV. Awakening the Stranger"; "V. Slide"; "VI. Stranger in Your Soul" | 30:00 |
| Total length: | | 36:03 |

== Personnel ==
- Neal Morse – lead vocals, keyboards, guitar
- Roine Stolt – guitar, vocals
- Pete Trewavas – bass guitar, vocals
- Mike Portnoy – drums, vocals
- Daniel Gildenlöw – additional keyboards, additional guitar, additional percussion, lead vocals on "Almost Home", backing vocals

== Charts ==
| Chart (2010) | Peak position |
|---|---|
| German Albums (Offizielle Top 100) | 52 |
| French Albums (SNEP) | 196 |
