= Half Way Home (album) =

Half-Way Home

Studio album by DeeExpus
- Released: 2008
- Recorded: 2007
- Genre: Progressive Rock
- Label: DXP Productions
- Producer: Andy Ditchfield

DeeExpus chronology
Half-Way Home (2008)	Far From Home (2009)

Half-Way Home is the debut album by English progressive rock band DeeExpus. It was recorded throughout 2007 by band founder and leader Andy Ditchfield, but features contributions from other musicians. It was released in 2008 and Ditchfield put together a band to tour the album.

During the tour supporting this album, the band's show at the Progrock 2009 festival was recorded for a live album and DVD. This was released in 2009 and titled Far From Home.

== Track listing ==
1. Greed (Ditchfield)
2. Pointless Child (Ditchfield)
3. PTtee (Ditchfield)
4. One Eight (Ditchfield)
5. One Day (Ditchfield)
6. Seven Nights (Ditchfield)
7. Half Way Home (Ditchfield/Wright)

== Credits (directly from sleeve notes) ==
- Andy Ditchfield - Lead/Rhythm/Acoustic Guitars; Bass Guitars; Keyboards; Piano; Drums; Backing Vocals; Programming
- Tony Wright - Lead/Backing Vocals

With:

- Phil Sloane - Guitar Solo (Tracks 1 and 4); Additional Guitar (4)
- Steve Wright - Guitar Solo (7)
- Ian Raine - Additional Bass Guitar (7)
- Mike Henderson - Keyboard Solo (3)

=== Band Credited in sleeve notes ===
- Tony Wright - Lead Vocals
- Phil Sloane - Lead/Rhythm Guitars
- Andy Ditchfield - Lead/Rhythm Guitars; Keyboards
- Ian Raine - Bass Guitars
- Leigh Crowther - Drums
