= Testimony Live =

Video by Neal Morse
- Released: July 5, 2004
- Recorded: November 2003
- Venues: 013 Club, Tilburg, the Netherlands
- Genre: Rock
- Length: 3 Hours 10 Minutes
- Labels: Metal Blade; Radiant Records
- Producer: Neal Morse

Neal Morse chronology
| Testimony (2003) | Testimony Live (2004) | One (2004) |

Professional ratings
Review scores
| Source | Rating |
|---|---|
| Tollbooth | (positive) |

Testimony Live is a live version of Neal Morse's Testimony. It was recorded live on stage in November 2003. With seven other musicians, Morse performed Testimony live in various cities across Europe. The show in the 013 Club, Tilburg, the Netherlands was filmed and recorded for this DVD released in 2004.

== Track listing ==
DVD 1:

- Part One
  1. "The Land of the Beginning Again"
  2. "Overture No. 1"
  3. "California Nights"
  4. "Colder in the Sun"
  5. "Sleeping Jesus"
  6. "Interlude"
  7. "The Prince of the Power of the Air"
  8. "The Promise"
  9. "Wasted Life
- Part Two
  1. "Overture No. 2"
  2. "Break of Day"
  3. "Power in the Air"
  4. "Somber Days"
  5. "Long Story"
  6. "It's All I Can Do"
- Part Three
  1. "Transformation"
  2. "Ready to Try"
  3. "Sing It High"
- Part Four
  1. "Moving in My Heart'
  2. "I Am Willing"
  3. "In the Middle"
  4. "The Storm Before the Calm"
  5. "Oh, To Feel Him"
  6. "God's Theme"
- Part Five
  1. "Overture No. 3"
  2. "Rejoice"
  3. "Oh Lord My God"
  4. "God's Theme 2"
  5. "The Land of the Beginning Again"

DVD 2:

- Encore
  1. "We All Need Some Light"
  2. "The Light"
  3. "Stranger in Your Soul"
- Addition material
  1. Tour Documentary

== Personnel ==
- Neal Morse – vocals, keyboards, guitars
- Mike Portnoy – drums, backing vocals
- Randy George – bass, keyboards, backing vocals
- Eric Brenton – guitar, violin, pedal steel guitar, mandolin, vocals
- John Krovosa – electric cello
- Bert Baldwin – keyboards, vocals
- Rick Altizer – guitar, keyboards, percussion, vocals
- Mark Leniger - percussion, saxophone, backing vocals
