= DeeExpus =

English progressive rock band

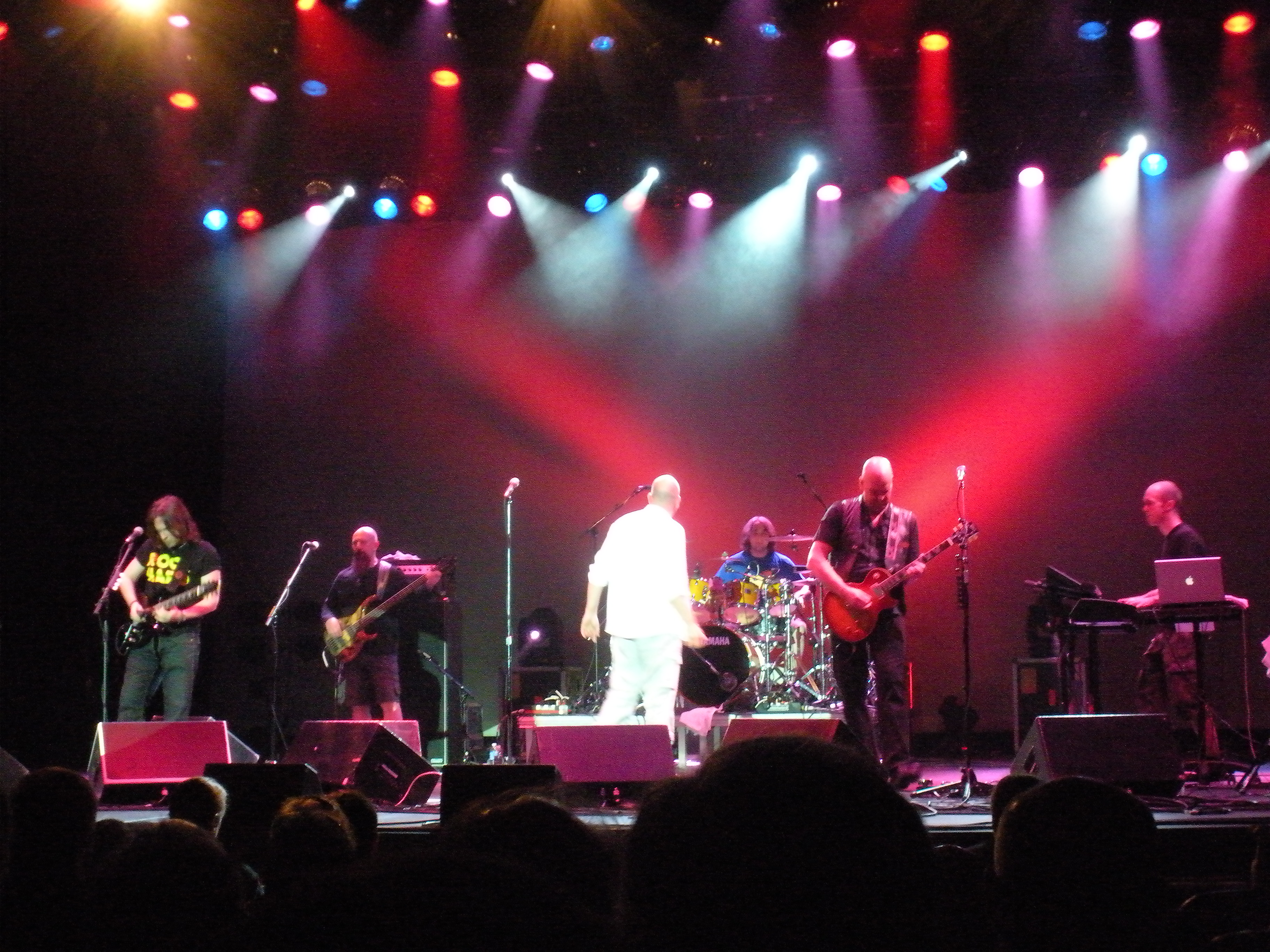
- DeeExpus performing in 2010

Background information
- Origin: Northeast England
- Genres: Progressive rock
- Years active: 2007–present
- Label: DXP Productions
- Members: Andy Ditchfield; Henry Rogers; Michael McCrystal; Mike Varty; David Anderson
- Past members: Tony Wright; John Dawson; Mark Kelly
- Website: deeexpus.com

DeeExpus is a melodic progressive rock group from North East England whose debut album, Half Way Home was released by DXP Productions in 2008, garnering fan buzz and enthusiastic reviews from around the world. In 2009, DeeExpus received the Classic Rock Society's award for "Best New Band" and released their first live CD and DVD Far From Home from their performance at the Progrock 2009 Festival in Katowice, Poland. The band released their follow-up album on 5 December 2011, The King of Number 33, featuring Mark Kelly from Marillion on keyboards with Andy Ditchfield and Nik Kershaw on lead vocal on the track "Memo". Their music is difficult to categorize, but they have been likened to other contemporary melodic progressive and heavy rock bands Marillion, Dream Theater, It Bites, Porcupine Tree, Tinyfish, Spock's Beard, Edison's Children and Frost*.

== Discography ==
Studio albums

- Half Way Home (2008)
- The King of Number 33 (2011)

Live albums

- Far from Home (2009)

== Personnel ==
=== Members ===
Current members

- Andy Ditchfield - guitars, keyboards, vocals (2007–present)
- Henry Rogers - drums (2010–present)
- Michael McCrystal - guitar (2012–present)
- Mike Varty - keyboards (2012–present)
- David Anderson - bass (2012–present)

Former members

- Tony Wright - vocals (2007-2012)
- Marc Jolliffe - Keyboards (2008-2010)
- John Dawson - bass (2010-2012)
- Mark Kelly - Keyboards (2010-2012)

=== Lineups ===
2007–2010	2010–2012	2012	2012–present
Andy Ditchfield - guitars, keyboards, vocals; Tony Wright - vocals; Marc Jolliffe - Keyboards	Andy Ditchfield - guitars, keyboards, vocals; Tony Wright - vocals; John Dawson - bass; Mark Kelly - keyboards; Henry Rogers - drums	Andy Ditchfield - guitars, keyboards, vocals; Tony Wright - vocals; John Dawson - bass; Henry Rogers - drums; Michael McCrystal - guitar; Mike Varty - keyboards	Andy Ditchfield - guitars, keyboards, vocals; Henry Rogers - drums; Michael McCrystal - guitar; Mike Varty - keyboards; David Anderson - bass
