= Touchstone (band) =

English progressive rock band

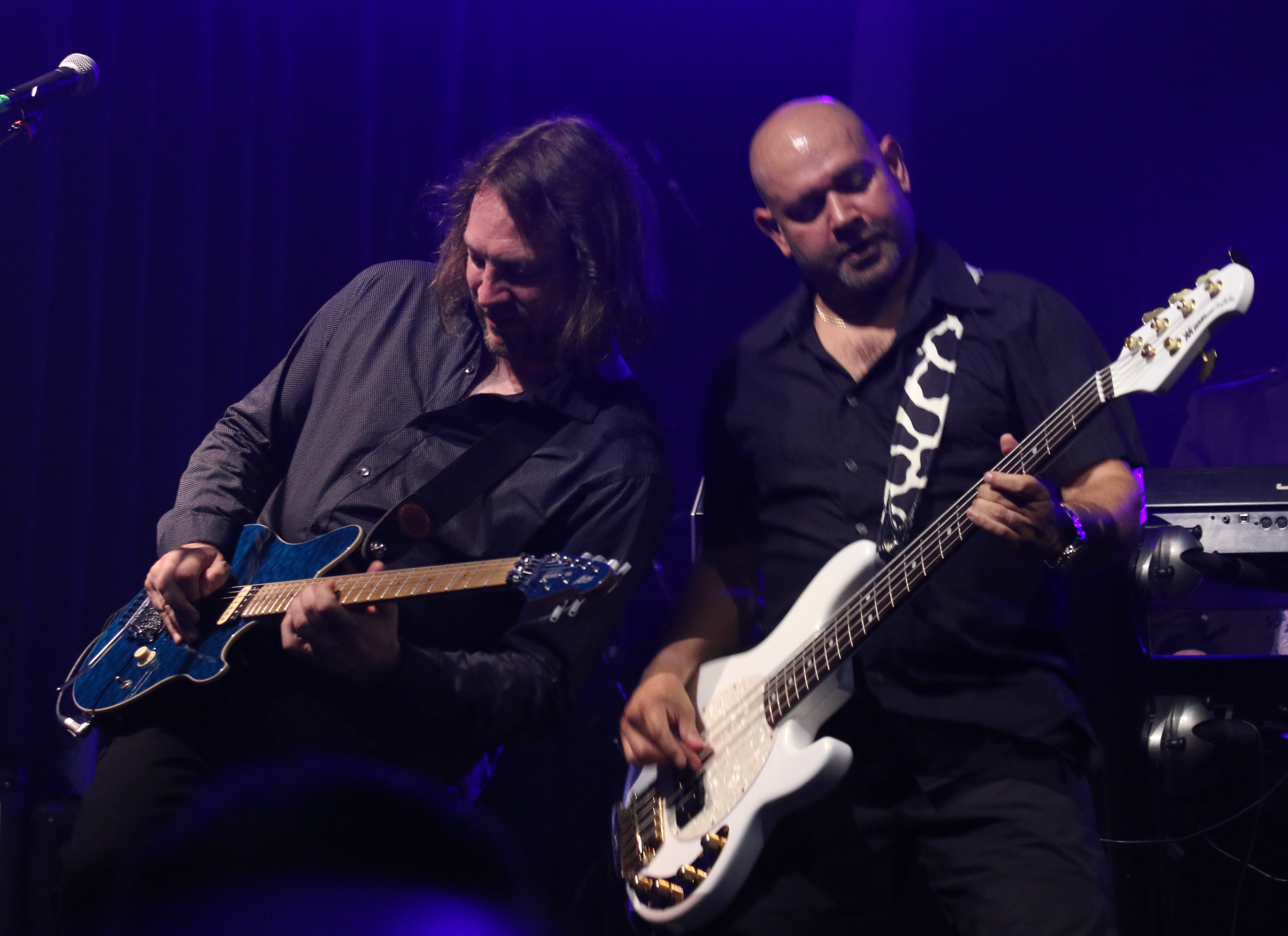
- Touchstone in 2017

Background information
- Origin: Hertfordshire, England
- Genres: Progressive rock, progressive metal
- Years active: 2003-present
- Members: Adam Hodgson; Paul 'Moo' Moorghen; Henry Rogers; Hayley Griffiths
- Past members: Rob Cottingham; Steve Barfoot; Mike Forrester; Simon Cook; Jona Sutch; Liz Clayden; Alasdair Melville; Kim 'Elkie' Seviour; Aggie Figurska

Touchstone are an English progressive rock band. The band was formed by keyboardist Rob Cottingham and guitarist Adam Hodgson in 2003. The name was thought up by Rob, being taken from a lyric in his solo album, Behind The Orchard Tree. Touchstone's music is distributed by Proper Music Distribution.

== Biography ==
Touchstone's first studio recording was an EP called Mad Hatters, in 2006. Its four songs included 'Misguided Fool' and 'The Mad Hatters' Song'. The EP was well-received, and spurred Rob and Adam to continue writing more material for the band. It is the only release to feature vocalist Liz Clayden and drummer Simon Cook.

Their first full-length album was Discordant Dreams and was the first to feature Kim Seviour and Alasdair Melville on vocals and drums respectively. The album was praised as an improvement from Mad Hatters, and with tracks such as 'Blacktide', 'Shadow' and 'The Beggar's Song', it showcases the 'Touchstone sound'. The album was recorded by Ben Humphreys and mixed by John Mitchell (It Bites, Frost*, Kino) at his studios in Reading, Berkshire.

Discordant Dreams was toured in September 2008 around the UK with It Bites on The Tall Ships Tour, with Touchstone featuring as support. The tour consisted of 12 UK dates, the final night taking place in Brighton.

The album led the band to win the Classic Rock Society Best New Band 2007 award, presented by John Wetton of Asia.

Touchstone's next studio work was Wintercoast. Released in June 2009, it features an opening narrative from the actor Jeremy Irons, describing someone's life in a city and his desire to leave for a place "seen reflected in a dream", called 'Wintercoast'. The album was also considered 'a step up from their previous album'. In particular, it has more emphasis on keyboard melodies, giving a more Marillion-style feel (as can be heard at the opening of the track, 'Line in the Sand'). There is also greater emphasis on drums and guitars, which results in passages which would fit well into the Heavy Metal genre.

The band performed at the 2009 United States Rites of Spring festival (ROSfest) which takes place annually in Glenside near Philadelphia, Pennsylvania. It was the first time they had played outside of the United Kingdom, and their performance was well-received, resulting in many positive reviews, including one by the website, USA Progressive Music.

In April 2010, Alasdair Melville decided to leave the band to pursue other musical endeavors and was replaced in Touchstone by Henry Rogers (DeeExpus) on a temporary basis. However, on 24 July it was announced that Henry would become a permanent member of Touchstone.

In July 2010, Touchstone released their first live album called Live in the USA which features songs from two festivals played in America; namely ROSfest 2009 and Calprog 2009. They played at the prestigious High Voltage Festival in Victoria Park, London and opened the Prog stage on Saturday 24 July, playing the first songs at the festival.

Throughout the remainder of 2010 and the beginning of 2011, the band took some time out to write material for their upcoming third studio album. A short tour called 'The Progressive Nation Tour' happened in March 2011. On 1 August 2011, Touchstone announced that they had signed to SPV GmbH's Steamhammer label. Their album The City Sleeps was released in October 2011 on this label, and entered the UK rock album charts at No. 36.

Founding member, Rob Cottingham, announced his second solo album project called "Captain Blue" on 13 July 2012, and announced drummer, Gary O'Toole (Steve Hackett Band) and bassist, Dr Goat Foot, on 20 July 2012. He also announced Adam Hodgson (Touchstone) on guitars, and Heather Findlay (ex-Mostly Autumn) on female vocals. Plus, as special guests, Steve Hackett (guitar solo on last track) and Shane Rimmer (voice over on first track).

The band released their fourth album, "Oceans of Time", in 2013. A second live album was released in 2014 featuring an audio recording of the band's 2013 show at the Robin in Bilston and two DVDs containing the Bilston live set, the band's live set at the 2010 High Voltage Festival and an 'Oceans of Time' making of documentary.

Cottingham and Seviour left the band in 2015 with a farewell gig at The Assembly in Leamington Spa on 21 November; following a series of auditions the band unveiled Polish vocalist Aggie Figurska as their new front-woman in June 2016.

Following Aggie Figurska's departure in December 2017, former Karnataka vocalist Hayley Griffiths joined the band.

== The Touchstone Sound ==
Touchstone has been described as "A band who combine the prog sensibilities of Yes with the hard rocking aptitudes of Van Halen".

== Personnel ==
=== Members ===
Current members

- Adam Hodgson - guitars (2003–present)
- Paul 'Moo' Moorghen - bass, backing vocals (2006–present)
- Henry Rogers - drums (2010–present)
- Hayley Griffiths - lead vocals (2018–present)

Former members

- Rob Cottingham - keyboards, lead vocals (2003–2015)
- Steve Barfoot - drums (2003-2004)
- Mike Forrester - bass (2003-2004)
- Simon Cook - drums (2004-2006)
- Jona Sutch - bass (2004-2006)
- Liz Clayden - lead vocals (2005-2007)
- Alasdair Melville - drums (2006-2010)
- Kim 'Elkie' Seviour - lead vocals (2007–2015)
- Aggie Figurska - lead vocals (2016-2017)

=== Lineups ===
2003-2004	2004-2005	2005-2006	2006
Steve Barfoot - drums; Rob Cottingham - keyboards, lead vocals; Mike Forrester - bass; Adam Hodgson - guitars	Rob Cottingham - keyboards, lead vocals; Adam Hodgson - guitars; Simon Cook - drums; Jona Sutch - bass	Rob Cottingham - keyboards, lead vocals; Adam Hodgson - guitars; Simon Cook - drums; Jona Sutch - bass; Liz Clayden - lead vocals	Rob Cottingham - keyboards, lead vocals; Adam Hodgson - guitars; Simon Cook - drums; Liz Clayden - lead vocals; Paul 'Moo' Moorghen - bass, backing vocals
2006-2007	2007-2010	2010-2015	2016–2017
Rob Cottingham - keyboards, lead vocals; Adam Hodgson - guitars; Liz Clayden - lead vocals; Paul 'Moo' Moorghen - bass, backing vocals; Alasdair Melville - drums	Rob Cottingham - keyboards, lead vocals; Adam Hodgson - guitars; Paul 'Moo' Moorghen - bass, backing vocals; Alasdair Melville - drums; Kim 'Elkie' Seviour - lead vocals	Rob Cottingham - keyboards, lead vocals; Adam Hodgson - guitars; Paul 'Moo' Moorghen - bass, backing vocals; Kim 'Elkie' Seviour - lead vocals; Henry Rogers - drums	Adam Hodgson - guitars; Paul 'Moo' Moorghen - bass, backing vocals; Henry Rogers - drums; Aggie Figurska - lead vocals

== Discography ==
Studio

- Discordant Dreams (2007)
- Wintercoast (2009)
- The City Sleeps (2011)
- Oceans of Time (2013)

EPs

- Mad Hatters (2006)
- Oceans (Limited Edition EP) (2014)

Live

- Live in the USA (2010)
- Live Inside Outside (2014)

== Critical acclaim ==
The album Discordant Dreams was rated 7 out of 10 in the July 2008 (10th Birthday Special Edition) issue of Classic Rock by Geoff Barton.

"Shadow", a track from the album Discordant Dreams, was featured on the "Prog Spawn" cover disk of the August 2008 issue of Classic Rock.

Wintercoast was praised in another review by Geoff Barton, and the track "Strange Days" played on the radio stations Total Rock, ARfm & Phoenix Radio.
