= SMPT:e =

Studio album by Transatlantic
- Released: March 21, 2000
- Recorded: June–July 1999
- Studio: Millbrook Studios, New York
- Genre: Progressive rock
- Length: 77:11
- Label: Metal Blade, Radiant
- Producer: Transatlantic

Transatlantic chronology
SMPT:e (2000)	Bridge Across Forever (2001)

Professional ratings
Review scores
Source	Rating
AllMusic	4.5/5 stars

SMPT:e (from StoltMorsePortnoyTrewavas) is the first album of the progressive rock supergroup Transatlantic. The title is a play on words: it's both a combination of the band members' initials and a reference to SMPTE timecodes, a type of time code used in recording technology.

The song "In Held ('Twas) in I" was originally recorded by progressive rock band Procol Harum in 1967 (released on the album Shine on Brightly, in 1968) and was widely regarded as the first progressive rock epic.

== Track listing ==
All songs by Neal Morse, Mike Portnoy, Pete Trewavas, and Roine Stolt, except where noted.

No.	Title	Length
1.	"All of the Above": I. "Full Moon Rising"; II. "October Winds"; III. "Camouflaged in Blue"; IV. "Half Alive"; V. "Undying Love"; VI. "Full Moon Rising (Reprise)"	30:59 7:11 5:54 5:22 2:02 3:57 6:33
2.	"We All Need Some Light" (Neal Morse)	5:44
3.	"Mystery Train"	6:51
4.	"My New World"	16:15
5.	"In Held ('Twas) in I" (Gary Brooker/Matthew Fisher/Keith Reid, arranged by Morse/Stolt/Portnoy/Trewavas): I. "Glimpses of Nirvana"; II. "In the Autumn of My Madness"; III. "Look to Your Soul"; IV. "Grand Finale (Instrumental)"	17:21
Total length:		77:11

=== Limited edition bonus disc ===
No.	Title	Original Artist	Length
1.	"My New World (Part 1)" (Neal Morse on lead vocals, different lyrics, alternative mix)	Stolt	7:40
2.	"My New World (Part 2)" (Neal Morse on lead vocals, different lyrics, alternative mix)	Stolt	8:41
3.	"We All Need Some Light" (Roine Stolt on lead vocals, alternative mix)	Morse	5:42
4.	"Honky Tonk Women" (Studio Jam)	The Rolling Stones	1:54
5.	"Oh! Darling" (Studio Jam)	The Beatles	2:30
6.	"My Cruel World" (Original Demo)	Stolt	10:43
7.	"Interactive Section" (Non audio)
Total length:			37:19

== Personnel ==
Transatlantic

- Roine Stolt — electric and 12-string acoustic guitars, lead vocals (4), Mellotrons, percussion
- Neal Morse — keyboards, lead (all but 4) and backing vocals, acoustic and electric guitars
- Mike Portnoy — drums, backing vocals
- Pete Trewavas — bass, lead (all but 4) and backing vocals, Moog Taurus pedals

== Production ==
- Arranged & Produced by Transatlantic
- Engineered by Chris Cubeta
- Additional Engineering by Stewart Every (for Pete's recordings at the Racket Club, UK)
- Mixed by Rich Mouser at The Mouse House, Los Angeles, CA November 1999
- Mastered by Vlado Meller at Sony Music Studios NYC January 2000
- Cover art and additional booklet art by Per Nordin (nota bene: 2 different covers. This article displays the European cover. The US / International cover is different, also by Per Nordin). The reason for 2 different covers was that the European company InsideOut was tired of so many blue covers. The artist therefore made this cover for the European edition (now rarely seen in print).

== Charts ==
Chart (2021)	Peak position
German Albums (Offizielle Top 100)	50
