= Kaleidoscope (Transatlantic album) =

Studio album by Transatlantic
- Released: January 27, 2014
- Genre: Progressive rock, neo-prog
- Length: 75:48
- Label: Metal Blade, Radiant
- Producer: Transatlantic

Transatlantic chronology
The Whirlwind (2009)	Kaleidoscope (2014)	The Absolute Universe (2021)

Singles from Kaleidoscope
- 1. "Shine" Released: December 2, 2013; 2. "Black As The Sky" Released: January 27, 2014

Professional ratings
Review scores
Source	Rating
AllMusic	4/5 stars

Kaleidoscope is the fourth studio album by progressive rock band Transatlantic. It was released on January 27, 2014.

== Background ==
Transatlantic released a music video for the song "Shine" on December 2, 2013. Two weeks later, the band's cover of the Yes song "And You and I", a bonus track on Kaleidoscope, was released on record label Inside Out's SoundCloud page. A video for "Black As the Sky" was released on January 27, 2014, to coincide with the album's release. On September 11, 2014, Kaleidoscope won 'Album of the Year' at the third annual Progressive Music Awards.

== Track listing ==
All tracks written and arranged by Neal Morse, Mike Portnoy, Roine Stolt and Pete Trewavas, except where noted.

No.	Title	Writer(s)	Length
1.	"Into the Blue": I. "Overture"; II. "The Dreamer and the Healer"; III. "A New Beginning"; IV. "Written in Your Heart"; V. "The Dreamer and the Healer (Reprise)"		25:13
2.	"Shine"		7:28
3.	"Black As the Sky"		6:45
4.	"Beyond the Sun"	Morse	4:29
5.	"Kaleidoscope": I. "Overture"; II. "Ride the Lightning"; III. "Black Gold"; IV. "Walking the Road"; V. "Desolation Days"; VI. "Lemon Looking Glass"; VII. "Ride the Lightning (Reprise)"		31:53
Total length:			75:48

Special edition bonus disc

No.	Title	Writer(s)	Original Artist	Length
1.	"And You and I"	Jon Anderson, Steve Howe, Chris Squire, Bill Bruford	Yes	10:43
2.	"Can't Get It Out of My Head"	Jeff Lynne	Electric Light Orchestra	4:43
3.	"Conquistador"	Gary Brooker, Keith Reid	Procol Harum	4:10
4.	"Goodbye Yellow Brick Road"	Elton John, Bernie Taupin	Elton John	3:16
5.	"Tin Soldier"	Steve Marriott, Ronnie Lane	Small Faces	3:21
6.	"Sylvia"	Thijs van Leer	Focus	3:49
7.	"Indiscipline"	Adrian Belew, Bill Bruford, Robert Fripp, Tony Levin	King Crimson	4:43
8.	"Nights in White Satin"	Justin Hayward	The Moody Blues	6:12
Total length:				40:59

== Personnel ==
Transatlantic

- Neal Morse — keyboards, acoustic guitars, vocals
- Roine Stolt — electric guitars, vocals, percussion, additional keyboards
- Pete Trewavas — bass guitar, vocals
- Mike Portnoy — drums, vocals

Additional musicians

- Chris Carmichael — cello
- Rich Mouser — pedal steel guitar on "Beyond the Sun"
- Daniel Gildenlöw — special guest vocals on "Written in Your Heart"

Production

- Transatlantic — production
- Rich Mouser — mixing
- Jerry Guidroz — engineering

Other

- Thomas Ewerhard — design and layout
- Per Nordin — Transatlantic Ship
- Joey Pippin — band photos
- Jerry Guidroz — Kaleidoscope photos

== Charts ==
Chart (2014)	Peak position
Austrian Albums (Ö3 Austria)	52
Belgian Albums (Ultratop Flanders)	83
Belgian Albums (Ultratop Wallonia)	59
Dutch Albums (Album Top 100)	6
Finnish Albums (Suomen virallinen lista)	22
French Albums (SNEP)	77
German Albums (Offizielle Top 100)	6
Scottish Albums (OCC)	59
Swedish Albums (Sverigetopplistan)	55
Swiss Albums (Schweizer Hitparade)	13
UK Albums (OCC)	52
UK Rock & Metal Albums (OCC)	4
US Top Hard Rock Albums (Billboard)	14
US Heatseekers Albums (Billboard)	3
US Independent Albums (Billboard)	36
