= The Absolute Universe =

- Cover of the Extended Version, Forevermore

Studio album by Transatlantic
- Released: February 5, 2021
- Recorded: September 2019–2020
- Studio: Fenix Studio (Varnhem, Sweden) mobile recordings in Sweden, the UK and the USA
- Genre: Progressive rock
- Length: 64:15 (abridged version); 90:14 (extended version); 96:30 (ultimate version)
- Label: Inside Out
- Producer: Transatlantic

Transatlantic chronology
Kaleidoscope (2014)	The Absolute Universe (2021)

Singles from The Absolute Universe
- 1. "Overture/Reaching for the Sky" Released: November 20, 2020; 2. "The World We Used to Know" Released: December 11, 2020; 3. "Looking for the Light" Released: January 15, 2021

The Absolute Universe is the fifth and final studio album of the progressive rock supergroup Transatlantic, released on February 5, 2021, by Inside Out.

Announced on November 11, 2020, The Absolute Universe is a concept album about "the world's struggles in 2020" and it is Transatlantic's first new studio album since 2014's Kaleidoscope. The album is released in three different formats: a 64-minute abridged version entitled The Breath of Life, a 90-minute extended version entitled Forevermore and a 96-minute deluxe edition that combines parts of both the abridged and extended versions. With regards to the different albums drummer Mike Portnoy said:

[...] the single CD is not merely an edited version of the double CD. They each contain alternate versions and even in some cases, new recordings. We wrote fresh lyrics and have different people singing on the single CD version tracks as compared to those on the double CD.

The band released three videos in support of the album, "Overture/Reaching for the Sky" on November 20, 2020, "The World We Used to Know" on December 11, 2020, and "Looking for the Light" on January 15, 2021.

== Background and production ==
Due to tours, vacations and ultimately COVID-19, the album's production suffered several delays. The 90-minute version (Forevermore) was originally written in September 2019 when the four members gathered in Sweden. Drummer Mike Portnoy recorded his parts in Nashville in November and keyboardist and vocalist Neal Morse recorded his parts in December and January.

Soon after a tour in Australia, Morse took some time off in New Zealand and started writing his solo album Sola Gratia, which diverted him completely from the Transatlantic album. In March 2020, he listened to the album again and contemplated shortening it so it could be released in a single disc - which some members already supported by the time of the album's writing, according to him. He created a shorter version of the album himself and sent it to the other members via an e-mail with a subject line that read "Am I crazy?"

Bassist Pete Trewavas agreed with Morse, but Portnoy and vocalist/guitarist Roine Stolt preferred the original version. The disagreement caused further delays. In May, Portnoy ultimately came with the suggestion of releasing two different versions, which was endorsed by all members and the label.

Morse was then tasked with creating the shorter version, titled The Breath of Life, while Stolt would produce the longer version, Forevermore. Morse would later say The Absolute Universe is the album that involved "the longest process" and "the most work" he's ever done in his career.

The album's structure is similar to their third album The Whirlwind, in that all songs combined form one single listening experience.

=== Lyrical themes ===
Neal Morse started writing lyrics for the album in March 2019, and he felt the band would possibly want to do a follow-up to The Whirlwind. When they gathered in studio, however, they rejected the idea, but some of the lyrics remained, resulting in some references to Whirlwind.

In December 2019/January 2020, Morse wrote a second round of lyrics inspired by his twenties and by The Fountainhead, Atlas Shrugged and The Virtue of Selfishness by Russian-American author Ayn Rand, which he called "kind of the mother of Libertarianism". He commented that he wrote lyrics about "how I went down this road of selfishness basically, and then how the Lord brought me out of it and how much better it is to not be in that place."

The third round of writing came in June–July 2020 and was inspired by the effects of the COVID-19 pandemic in the United States (particularly Nashville).

Commenting on the lyrics written by bassist and vocalist Pete Trewavas back in 2019, Stolt felt they somehow anticipated the COVID-19 situation. Trewavas himself described the idea behind the album as follows:

The idea behind The Absolute Universe started out as a broad and encompassing look at the human condition. Someone moving though their life, trying to find out who they are, where they fit in etc. This worked well as a concept to hang all the music we had on. It also allowed us to move through all the different subject matter we had lyrically. [...] You find a lot out about people in adverse conditions. Who your friends are for example, how people cope under duress and dealing with stress. All these things get reflected on in different ways on both versions of the album.

He felt The Breath of Life version, captained by Morse, focused more on the consequences of the COVID-19 restrictions on people's lives.

== Critical reception ==
Professional ratings
Review scores
Source	Rating
AllMusic	4.5/5 stars
Classic Rock	3/5 stars
Metal Hammer (Germany)	6/7
Metal Hammer (Portugal)	4.5/5
Prog	0/5 stars
Prog Radio	4/5 stars
Rock Hard	8.5/10
Sonic Perspectives	9.3/10

The Absolute Universe was well received by critics.

Chris Roberts from Classic Rock said the band takes the listener "on a journey through the tropes of modern, technically flawless AOR-tinted prog, the playing proficient, the soul of it elusive." On the other hand, he remarked that "the casual listener might wish the band would more frequently twist instead of stick."

Scott Medina from Sonic Perspectives said the album matches the quality of The Whirlwind and while he admitted those who prefer epic songs could feel "less enthusiastic", he said "there's no denying that this sounds just like what most people imagine when they think 'Transatlantic'. About the different versions, he commented that Forevermore "has more of Stolt" and "carries a bit more shadow and mystery", while The Breath of Life feels "a little more direct and accessible" and has been injected with "a little more light and love" by Morse. He praised all musicians' performances.

Writing for the Portuguese edition of Metal Hammer, and based on the Forevermore version, João Braga thought the album title is representative of its style and innovation and remarked that the band has released an album that is long due to the number of tracks rather than to their size. He also thought the first part is more "positive" and "inspiring" in terms of instrumentation, while the second one is filled with "ballads or, at least, ambient and spiritual tracks backed by strong progressive rock."

In the German edition of the magazine, Frank Thießies recommended the abridged version "for casual listeners to enjoy the great harmony-bristling chants, Hammond and Moog fountains as well as The Beatles-colored to Pink Floyd-colored Melodic Prog" and the extended version to those who "can't get enough of Morse's melody bliss anyway and can do with a few more progressive twists and bonus minutes per song".

Rock Hard' Michael Rensen said the album "is not just a fanatic, but an exciting rollercoaster ride lasting several hours through the Classic Prog Wonderland". He thought that the band had better moments in the past and that they work better when Morse is the vocalist, but still believed Transatlantic delivered "the finest genre fare despite all the compositional routine".

On AllMusic, Thom Jurek said The Absolute Universe (Forevermore version) "showcases Transatlantic's consummate composing, production, and arrangement skills in near-perfect balance with emotional intelligence, and keen psychological and spiritual insight. They navigate these songs with compassionate empathy, openness, and a consummate sense of musical possibility. You really can't ask for more from popular art."

Writing for Prog magazine, Grant Moon said the two versions offer "if not the best of both worlds, certainly the most of them", but questioned if an "objective producer" could have helped them "see the wood for the trees, make choices, and fashion the one great album currently residing inside two very good ones".

== Track listing ==
All tracks written and arranged by Neal Morse, Mike Portnoy, Roine Stolt and Pete Trewavas

=== Forevermore (extended version) ===
Disc 1
No.	Title	Length
1.	"Overture"	8:12
2.	"Heart Like a Whirlwind"	5:11
3.	"Higher Than the Morning"	5:30
4.	"The Darkness in the Light"	5:43
5.	"Swing High, Swing Low"	3:48
6.	"Bully"	2:11
7.	"Rainbow Sky"	3:19
8.	"Looking for the Light"	4:00
9.	"The World We Used to Know"	9:22
Total length:		47:12

Disc 2
No.	Title	Length
1.	"The Sun Comes Up Today"	5:39
2.	"Love Made a Way (Prelude)"	1:26
3.	"Owl Howl"	7:06
4.	"Solitude"	5:41
5.	"Belong"	2:49
6.	"Lonesome Rebel"	2:54
7.	"Looking for the Light (Reprise)"	5:13
8.	"The Greatest Story Never Ends"	4:18
9.	"Love Made a Way"	8:03
Total length:		43:02

=== The Breath of Life (abridged version) ===
No.	Title	Length
1.	"Overture"	5:52
2.	"Reaching for the Sky"	5:41
3.	"Higher Than the Morning"	4:32
4.	"The Darkness in the Light"	5:43
5.	"Take Now My Soul"	3:31
6.	"Looking for the Light"	4:05
7.	"Love Made a Way (Prelude)"	2:13
8.	"Owl Howl"	5:27
9.	"Solitude"	4:24
10.	"Belong"	2:23
11.	"Can You Feel It"	3:17
12.	"Looking for the Light (Reprise)"	4:57
13.	"The Greatest Story Never Ends"	2:58
14.	"Love Made a Way"	9:16
Total length:		64:15

=== Blu-ray ===
5.1 mix (ultimate version)
No.	Title	Length
1.	"Overture"	9:18
2.	"Reaching for the Sky"	5:40
3.	"Higher Than the Morning"	5:29
4.	"The Darkness in the Light"	5:42
5.	"Take Now My Soul"	3:31
6.	"Bully"	2:11
7.	"Rainbow Sky"	3:19
8.	"Looking for the Light"	3:59
9.	"The World We Used to Know"	9:21
10.	"The Sun Comes Up Today"	5:38
11.	"Love Made a Way (Prelude)"	1:25
12.	"Owl Howl"	7:05
13.	"Solitude"	5:41
14.	"Belong"	2:49
15.	"Lonesome Rebel"	2:53
16.	"Can You Feel It"	3:17
17.	"Looking for the Light (Reprise)"	5:12
18.	"The Greatest Story Never Ends"	5:58
19.	"Love Made a Way"	8:02
Total length:		96:30

== Personnel ==
- Neal Morse – vocals, piano, Hammond organ, minimoog, mellotron, acoustic guitars & churango
- Roine Stolt – vocals, electric & acoustic 6 & 12 strings guitars, ukulele, keyboards & percussion
- Pete Trewavas – vocals, bass
- Mike Portnoy – vocals, drums & percussion

Additional musicians

- Gideon Klein – cello, viola & string bass
- Josee Weigand – violin & viola

- Thomas Ewerhard – artwork
- Pavel Zhovba – artwork (airship only)
- Rich Mouser – mixing

== Charts ==
Chart performance for The Absolute Universe
Chart (2021)	Peak position
Austrian Albums (Ö3 Austria)	7
Belgian Albums (Ultratop Flanders)	40
Belgian Albums (Ultratop Wallonia)	29
Dutch Albums (Album Top 100)	4
Finnish Albums (Suomen virallinen lista) Forevermore	29
French Albums (SNEP)	83
German Albums (Offizielle Top 100)	3
Portuguese Albums (AFP)	30
Scottish Albums (OCC) Forevermore	10
Scottish Albums (OCC) The Breath of Life	31
Scottish Albums (OCC) Ultimate	76
Spanish Albums (PROMUSICAE) Forevermore	42
Spanish Albums (PROMUSICAE) The Breath of Life (vinyl albums)	81
Spanish Albums (PROMUSICAE) The Ultimate Edition (vinyl albums)	20
Swedish Albums (Sverigetopplistan)	32
Swiss Albums (Schweizer Hitparade)	3
UK Albums (OCC) Forevermore	56
