= Bridge Across Forever =

Studio album by Transatlantic
- Released: October 9, 2001
- Recorded: January 2001
- Studios: Dark Horse Studios, Nashville, Tennessee
- Genre: Progressive rock
- Length: 76:48
- Labels: Metal Blade, Radiant
- Producer: Transatlantic

Transatlantic chronology
SMPT:e (2000)	Bridge Across Forever (2001)	The Whirlwind (2009)

Professional ratings
Review scores
Source	Rating
AllMusic	4.5/5 stars
Bright Eyes	(11/13)

Bridge Across Forever is the second studio album of progressive rock supergroup Transatlantic, released in 2001. For this album, the band attempted to balance each member's contributions more equally, because of criticisms that their first album, SMPT:e, was too dominated by the style of vocalist Neal Morse. Like their first album, Bridge Across Forever was well received by critics and progressive rock fans, though it had little mainstream popularity. While it is not a concept album, all the lengthy epics share at least one movement with another.

== Track listing ==
All songs by Neal Morse, Roine Stolt, Mike Portnoy, and Pete Trewavas, except where noted.

No.	Title	Length
1.	"Duel with the Devil": I. "Motherless Children"; II. "Walk Away"; III. "Silence of the Night"; IV. "You're Not Alone"; V. "Almost Home""	26:43 7:06 4:19 4:23 3:49 7:06
2.	"Suite Charlotte Pike": I. "If She Runs"; II. "Mr. Wonderful"; III. "Lost and Found Pt. 1"; IV. "Temple of the Gods"; V. "Motherless Children/If She Runs (Reprise)"	14:33 4:38 2:42 1:12 2:21 3:37
3.	"Bridge Across Forever" (Neal Morse, Celeste Prince)	5:32
4.	"Stranger in Your Soul": I. "Sleeping Wide Awake"; II. "Hanging in the Balance"; III. "Lost and Found Pt. 2"; IV. "Awakening the Stranger"; V. "Slide"; VI. "Stranger in Your Soul"; Silence; Hidden reprise of "Suite Charlotte Pike""	30:00 6:03 3:23 3:07 5:05 4:02 4:36 1:20 2:34
Total length:		76:48

=== Limited edition bonus disc ===
No.	Title	Original Artist	Length
1.	"Shine On You Crazy Diamond"	Pink Floyd	15:27
2.	"Studio Chat"		4:50
3.	"And I Love Her" (Studio Jam)	The Beatles	7:53
4.	"Smoke on the Water" (Studio Jam as "Transpacific")	Deep Purple	4:20
5.	"Dance with the Devil" (Original Demo)	Morse	9:01
6.	"Roine's Demo Bits" (Original Demo)	Stolt	12:00
7.	"Interactive Section" (Video)		2:36
Total length:			56:15

== Personnel ==
Transatlantic

- Neal Morse — Grand Piano, Hammond Organ, Mini Moog, Rhodes Piano, Synthesizer, Vocals, Additional Guitars and Mandolin, Drums on Bonus Disc Track 4
- Roine Stolt — Electric and Acoustic Guitars, Vocals, Mellotron, Additional Keyboards and Percussion
- Pete Trewavas — Warwick Bass, Taurus Bass Pedals and Vocals, Organ on Bonus Disc Track 4
- Mike Portnoy — Drums and Vocals, Bass on Bonus Disc Track 4

Additional Musicians

- Chris Carmichael — Violin, Viola and Cello on "Stranger in Your Soul" & "Duel With the Devil"
- Keith Mears — Saxophone on "Duel With the Devil"
- The "Elite" choir — Background Vocals on "Duel With The Devil"

== Production ==
- Arranged & Produced by Transatlantic
- Engineered by Ed Simonton
- Additional Engineering by Stewart Every (for Pete's recordings at the Racket Club, UK)
- Mixed by Richard Mouser at The Mouse House, Los Angeles, CA
- Mastered by Vlado Meller at Sony Music Studios NYC

== Charts ==
Chart (2009)	Peak position
German Albums (Offizielle Top 100)	56
