= Testimony (Neal Morse album) =

Studio album by Neal Morse
- Released: 22 September 2003
- Recorded: The Morse House, Nashville 2003
- Genre: Progressive rock
- Length: 123:43; 137:22 (for the Ltd. Edition)
- Labels: Metal Blade; Radiant Records
- Producer: Rich Mouser

Neal Morse chronology
The Transatlantic Demos (2003)	Testimony (2003)	Testimony Live (2004)

Professional ratings
Review scores
Source	Rating
Allmusic	4.5/5 stars
DPRP	(?)
Tollbooth	(positive)

Testimony is the third studio album, and the first concept album, by Neal Morse. Released in 2003, this double record is in five sections detailing the composer's life and conversion to Christianity. The album features performances from Dream Theater drummer Mike Portnoy and Kerry Livgren of Kansas, although the majority of instruments are played by Morse himself.

Footage from the writing and recording sessions for this album was released as a two-hour DVD titled Making of Testimony: Rough Edit in September 2007.

The story was also expanded upon and released in book form in 2011, also under the title Testimony.

== Track listing ==
All songs written and composed by Neal Morse.

=== Disc One ===
Part 1
No.	Title	Length
1.	"The Land of Beginning Again"	3:10
2.	"Overture No. 1"	5:58
3.	"California Nights"	5:46
4.	"Colder in the Sun"	6:20
5.	"Sleeping Jesus"	5:32
6.	"Interlude"	1:56
7.	"The Prince of the Power of the Air"	2:43
8.	"The Promise"	2:52
9.	"Wasted Life"	6:50
Total length:		41:08

Part 2
No.	Title	Length
1.	"Overture No. 2"	2:31
2.	"Break of Day"	6:55
3.	"Power in the Air"	5:03
4.	"Somber Days"	5:06
5.	"Long Story"	5:35
6.	"It's All I Can Do"	6:25
Total length:		31:38

=== Disc Two ===
Part 3
No.	Title	Length
1.	"Transformation"	3:00
2.	"Ready to Try"	4:17
3.	"Sing it High"	4:48
Total length:		12:06

Part 4
No.	Title	Length
1.	"Moving in My Heart"	3:06
2.	"I Am Willing"	6:28
3.	"In the Middle"	2:27
4.	"The Storm Before the Calm"	7:31
5.	"Oh, to Feel Him"	6:17
6.	"God's Theme"	2:31
Total length:		28:19

Part 5
No.	Title	Length
1.	"Overture No. 3"	1:05
2.	"Rejoice"	2:28
3.	"Oh Lord My God"	3:54
4.	"God's Theme 2"	2:10
5.	"The Land of Beginning Again"	0:54
Total length:		10:33

=== Disc Three (Limited Edition) ===
No.	Title	Length
1.	"The fang... sings!"	0:18
2.	"Tuesday Afternoon/Find My Way Back Home"	13:21
Total length:		13:39

== Personnel ==
- Neal Morse - producer, composer, guitars, bass guitar, synth, piano, organ, vocals
- Mike Portnoy - drums
- Kerry Livgren - guitar solo on "Long Story"
- Eric Brenton - violin, flute
- Chris Carmichael - violin, cello, strings
- David Henry - Cello
- Jim Hoke - Sax
- Neil Rosengarden - Trumpet
- Katie Hagen - French horn
- Mark Leniger - Saxophone, Soloist
- Byron House - string bass
- Glenn Caruba - percussion
- Johnny Cox - Pedal steel guitar
- Jerry Guidroz - Engineer, Handclapping, Sampling
- Pamela Ward, Aaron Marshall, Rick Altizer, Terry White, Gene Miller - backing vocals
- Rich Mouser - Mixing

== Release details ==
- 2003, UK, Inside Out Music/Spv 6-93723-60412-1, Release Date 22 September 2003, CD
- 2003, UK, Inside Out Music/Spv 6-93723-00502-7, Release Date 29 September 2003, CD (Special Edition 3-CD set)
- 2003, USA, Radiant Records I491302, Release Date 22 September 2003, CD
