= Classic Rock Society =

UK-based organisation to promote classic and progressive rock music

Classic Rock Society, also known as CRS, was founded by Martin Hudson in 1991 in Rotherham, England, at the Florence Nightingale public house, and quickly progressed to become a large and well recognised organisation helping to forward the cause of progressive rock, and classic rock. Between 2001 and 2012, the CRS was operated as a limited company, Classic Rock (UK) Ltd, before reverting to a society. The CRS announced its closure on 7 March 2019.

CRS founder Martin Hudson, former director Kris Hudson-Lee and long-serving writer James R Turner, founded Spirit of Progressive Rock in 2019 to pick up where the CRS left off. Spirit has its own website where they review new progressive albums as well as promoting gigs at the Corporation in Sheffield.

== Live music promotions ==
The Classic Rock Society used the Wesley Arts Centre, Maltby, Rotherham, England, Montgomery Hall, Wath-on-Dearne, England, and The Citadel, St Helens, England, as its regular venues. It also hosted gigs at B2, Norwich, England, The Picturedrome, Holmfirth, England, The Luminaire, London, amongst others.

== Artists who have performed for the CRS ==
Artists previously hosted by the CRS include Camel, Caravan, Celtus, The Flower Kings, Gordon Giltrap, IQ, Karnataka, Guy Manning, Galahad, Lazuli, Magenta, Mostly Autumn, Pallas, Pendragon, Rick Wakeman, Saga, Spocks Beard, Steve Hackett, Strawbs, The Tangent, Moon Safari, Chantel McGregor, Deborah Bonham, Threshold, Touchstone, Tristan Park, the first ever UK gig by Tyketto, and Wishbone Ash.

== Wondrous Stories / Rock Society ==
The society started publishing its monthly magazine, Wondrous Stories, at its inception, which then became Rock Society and was a bi-monthly featuring reviews, interviews with prominent classic rock musicians and up and coming bands. Writer James R Turner was one of the longest-serving contributors, writing for the magazine from 1994 to 2019. The magazine was one of the first in the UK to promote progressive and classic rock and precedes the Classic Rock magazine by several years. The last magazine, issue 230, was published in May 2019.
