= One (Neal Morse album) =

Studio album by Neal Morse
- Released: November 2, 2004
- Recorded: 2004
- Studios: The Morse House, Nashville, Tennessee
- Genre: Progressive rock
- Length: 79:55
- Labels: Metal Blade; Radiant Records
- Producers: Bill Evans and Neal Morse

Neal Morse chronology
Testimony Live (DVD) (2004)	One (2004)	God Won't Give Up (2005)

Professional ratings
Review scores
Source	Rating
Tollbooth	(Extremely positive)
Allmusic	3/5 stars

One is a Christian progressive rock concept album by multi-instrumentalist Neal Morse and his fourth studio album. Released in 2004, this was released as both a single-CD album and a special edition double-CD with deleted tracks and cover songs. The album explores the biblical theme of humanity’s separation from and reunion with God. The album is inspired by the Parable of the Prodigal Son and the idea of man’s fall from grace and eventual reconciliation with God.

The band is Neal, Mike Portnoy (Dream Theater), and Randy George (Ajalon) with guest Phil Keaggy.

== Track listing ==
Credits adapted from CD booklet.

All tracks are written by Neal Morse, except where noted.

Regular Release
No.	Title	Writer(s)	Lyrics	Length
1.	"The Creation"; I. "One Mind"; II. "In a Perfect Light"; III. "Where Are You?"; IV. "Reaching from the Heart"	Randy George; Neal Morse; Mike Portnoy	George; Morse	18:23
2.	"The Man's Gone"			2:51
3.	"Author of Confusion"		George; Morse	9:31
4.	"The Separated Man; I. "I'm in a Cage"; II. "I Am the Man"; III. "The Man's Gone (Reprise)"; IV. "Something Within Me Remembers"			17:59
5.	"Cradle to the Grave"		George; Morse	4:56
6.	"Help Me/The Spirit and the Flesh"		George; Morse	11:14
7.	"Father of Forgiveness"			5:47
8.	"Reunion; I. "No Separation"; II. "Grand Finale"; III. "Make Us One"	George; Morse; Portnoy	George; Morse	9:11
Total length:				79:52

Special Edition Bonus CD
No.	Title	Writer(s)	Lyrics	Length
1.	"Back to the Garden"			4:26
2.	"Nothing to Believe"			3:29
3.	"Cradle to the Grave (Neal's Vocal)"		George; Morse	4:55
4.	"King Jesus"			4:48
5.	"What Is Life?" (George Harrison)	George Harrison	George Harrison	4:28
6.	"Where the Streets Have No Name" (U2)	Adam Clayton; David Evans; Paul Hewson; Larry Mullen Jr.	Paul Hewson	5:46
7.	"Day After Day" (Badfinger)	Pete Ham	Pete Ham	3:25
8.	"Chris Carmichael's Aria"			1:07
9.	"I'm Free/Sparks" (The Who)	Pete Townshend	Pete Townshend	6:36
Total length:				39:14

=== Restored track list ===
This is the track list as described by Neal Morse with bonus tracks in their original place.

No.	Title	Length
1.	"The Creation"	18:22
2.	"The Man's Gone"	2:50
3.	"Nothing to Believe"	3:29
4.	"Author of Confusion"	9:30
5.	"The Separated Man"	17:58
6.	"Cradle to the Grave"	4:55
7.	"Help Me/The Spirit and the Flesh"	11:13
8.	"King Jesus"	4:48
9.	"Father of Forgiveness"	5:46
10.	"Reunion"	9:11
Total length:		88:02

== Critical reception ==
In 2018, One was ranked number 3 all time in the Neal Morse discography behind Sola Scriptura and The Similitude of a Dream.

== Personnel ==
- Neal Morse – lead vocals, Keyboards, Guitars
- Mike Portnoy – drums
- Randy George – bass guitar

Technical personnel

- Rich Mouser - mixing

=== Additional musicians and special guests ===
- Phil Keaggy – Electric guitar solo in "The Creation" at 8:25, Acoustic guitar solo in "The Man's Gone (Reprise)", 2nd Lead Vocals on Cradle to the Grave.
- Chris Carmichael – Violin, Viola, and Background Vocals
- Gene Miller – Additional Vocals
- Rick Altizer – Additional Vocals
- Michael Thurman – French Horn
- Rachel Rigdon – Violin
- Hannah Vanderpool – Cello
- Dave Jacques – String Bass
- Jim Hoke – Saxophone
- Neil Rosengarden – Trumpet
- Bill Huber – Trombone
- Glenn Caruba – Percussion
- Aaron Marshall – Background Vocals
- Missy Hale – Background Vocals

== Release details ==
- 2004, UK, Inside Out Music/Spv ?, Release Date 8 November 2004, CD
- 2004, UK, Inside Out Music/Spv 6-93723-01182-0, Release Date 8 November 2004, CD (Special Edition 2-CD set)
- 2004, USA, Radiant Records/Metal Blade ?, Release Date 2 November 2004, CD
