= The Whirlwind (album) =

Studio album by Transatlantic
- Released: October 23, 2009
- Recorded: April 2009
- Genre: Progressive rock
- Length: 77:46
- Label: Metal Blade, Radiant
- Producer: Transatlantic

Transatlantic chronology
Bridge Across Forever (2001)	The Whirlwind (2009)	Whirld Tour 2010: Live in London (2010)

The Whirlwind is the third studio album by supergroup Transatlantic, released on October 23, 2009. It is available in three formats: a standard edition, a double disc special edition and a deluxe edition with a 105-minute making-of DVD.

The main album, while indexed into twelve tracks, is considered one song. It is represented as one track on the band's third and fourth live album Whirld Tour 2010: Live in London and More Never Is Enough: Live In Manchester & Tilburg 2010 respectively.

The bonus disc (which comes with the Special and Deluxe Editions) includes eight new studio recordings: four original Transatlantic songs and four cover songs, which are "The Return of the Giant Hogweed" by Genesis, "A Salty Dog" by Procol Harum, a combination of America's and The Beatles "I Need You" and Santana's "Soul Sacrifice". At the end of the second disc, there is a hidden track by the band, played on ukulele with vocals.

The album peaked number 21 in the Top Heatseekers chart and number 45 in the German album chart.

== Critical reception ==
Professional ratings
Review scores
Source	Rating
Lords of Metal	(92/100)

In 2020, The Whirlwind was named best progressive rock album of the last 20 years (2000–2019) by The Prog Report.

== Track listing ==
- Written and arranged by Transatlantic.

No.	Title	Length
1.	"The Whirlwind" I. "Overture / Whirlwind" II. "The Wind Blew Them All Away" III. "On the Prowl" IV. "A Man Can Feel" V. "Out of the Night" VI. "Rose Colored Glasses" VII. "Evermore" VIII. "Set Us Free" IX. "Lay Down Your Life" X. "Pieces of Heaven" XI. "Is It Really Happening?" XII. "Dancing with Eternal Glory / Whirlwind (Reprise)"	77:46 9:53 6:09 6:02 6:34 4:22 7:53 4:09 5:03 5:10 2:17 8:11 12:03
Total length:		77:46

Special edition bonus disc

No.	Title	Writer(s)	Original Artist	Length
1.	"Spinning"	Stolt, Portnoy, Trewavas, Morse		9:58
2.	"Lenny Johnson"	Stolt		4:20
3.	"For Such a Time"	Morse, Trewavas		5:22
4.	"Lending a Hand"	Trewavas		8:43
5.	"The Return of the Giant Hogweed"	Tony Banks, Phil Collins, Peter Gabriel, Steve Hackett and Mike Rutherford	Genesis	8:26
6.	"A Salty Dog"	Gary Brooker	Procol Harum	4:59
7.	"I Need You"	Gerry Beckley and George Harrison	America / The Beatles	4:39
8.	"Soul Sacrifice"	Santana	Santana	10:00
Total length:				56:27

Notes

- "I Need You" is a combination of The Beatles' "I Need You" and America's "I Need You"
- "Soul Sacrifice" ends at 8:38, followed by a short silence and a hidden untitled track.

== Personnel ==
=== Transatlantic ===
- Neal Morse – keyboards, acoustic guitars, percussion, and vocals
- Mike Portnoy – drums and vocals
- Roine Stolt – electric guitars, vocals, percussion, additional mellotron, minimoog & soundscapes
- Pete Trewavas – bass guitar, vocals, occasional VST Synthesizer & orchestration

=== Additional musicians ===
- Chris Carmichael – strings
- Marc Papeghin – French horn

=== Production ===
- Arranged & Produced by Transatlantic
- Engineered by Jerry Guidroz
- Mixed by Richard Mouser
- Mastered by Robert Vosigen at Capitol Mastering, Hollywood CA

== Charts ==
Chart (2009)	Peak position
Dutch Albums (Album Top 100)	40
French Albums (SNEP)	134
German Albums (Offizielle Top 100)	45
Swedish Albums (Sverigetopplistan)	59
US Heatseekers Albums (Billboard)	21
