= Transatlantic (band) =

Multinational progressive rock supergroup

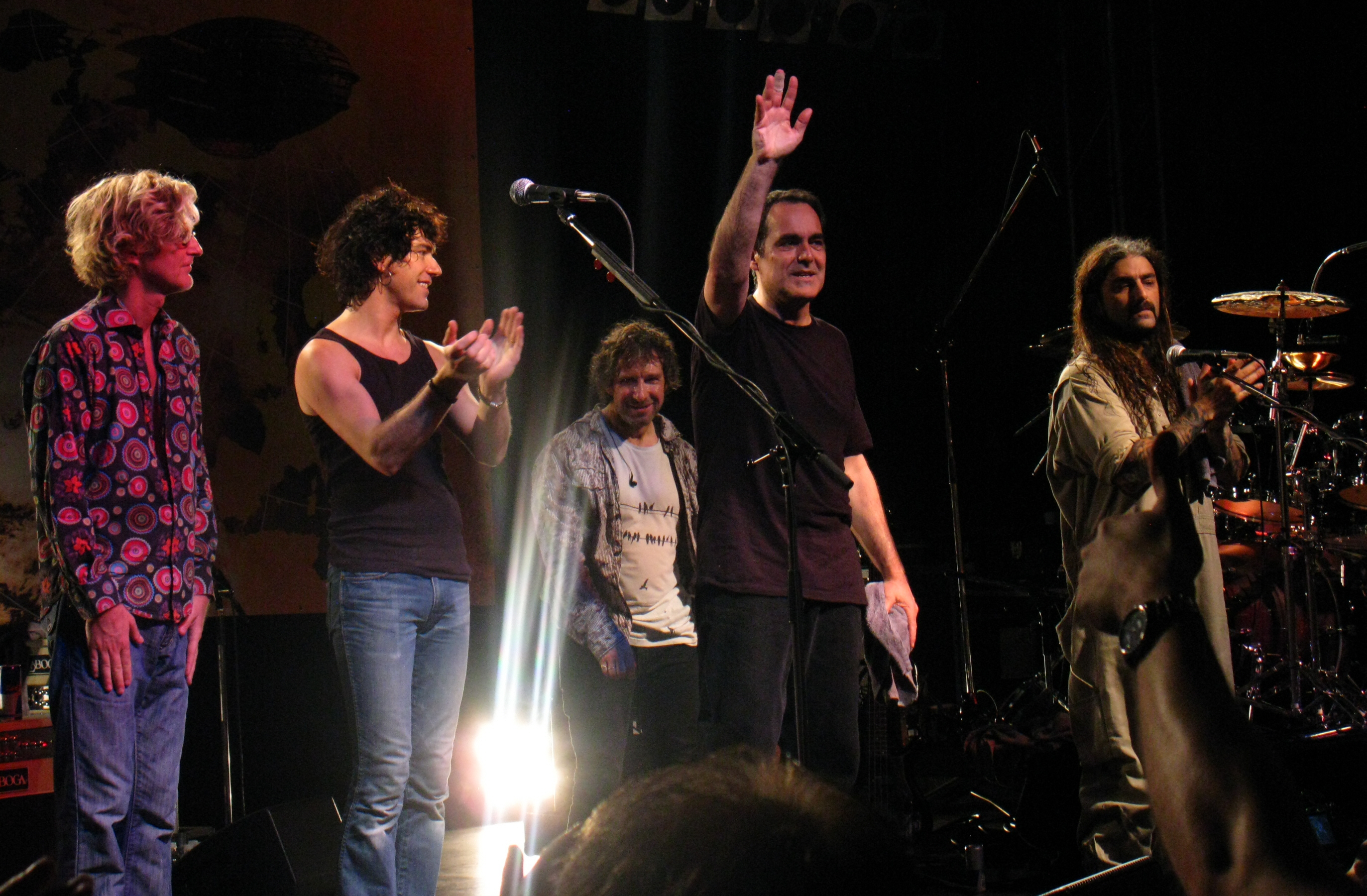
- Transatlantic in 2010: Roine Stolt, Daniel Gildenlöw, Pete Trewavas, Neal Morse, Mike Portnoy

Background information
- Origin: United States, United Kingdom, Sweden
- Genres: Progressive rock
- Years active: 1999–2002, 2009–2017, 2019-2022
- Labels: InsideOut, Metal Blade/Radiant
- Past members: Neal Morse; Mike Portnoy; Roine Stolt; Pete Trewavas
- Website: transatlanticweb.com

Transatlantic were a multinational progressive rock supergroup consisting of Neal Morse (ex–Spock's Beard), Roine Stolt (Kaipa, the Flower Kings), Pete Trewavas (Marillion, Edison's Children) and Mike Portnoy (Dream Theater). They formed in 1999 as a side project to their full-time bands, but disbanded in 2002. They then reunited in 2009, and then disbanded again in 2022.

Despite not being an official member and only appearing on one studio album, Daniel Gildenlöw (Pain of Salvation) has often joined the band during live shows. However, due to illness, Ted Leonard stood in for him during the 2014 tour. Leonard also joined the band during the 2022 tour.

== Biography ==
=== Formation ===
Originally intending to include Fates Warning guitarist Jim Matheos, Morse and Portnoy tapped Flower Kings guitarist/vocalist Roine Stolt when Matheos was unable to participate. The band completed their lineup by adding bassist and progressive rock veteran Pete Trewavas from the group Marillion and Edison's Children. Before Transatlantic, the first moniker the band came up with was "Second Nature".

=== SMPT:e and Bridge Across Forever (2000–2002) ===
Their first album, 2000's SMPT:e (a play on words, as both a combination of the members' last initials, as well as a common machine time protocol used in high end recording studios) received strong critical reviews, including "some of the best progressive rock music ever written" (Robert Taylor in AllMusic).

A subsequent tour of the United States led to a double live CD, Transatlantic Live in America, and a video of the same name. The band showed their musical heritage on the live CD, presenting covers of the Beatles' "Strawberry Fields Forever", as well as a medley of Genesis' epic "Watcher of the Skies" and "Firth of Fifth". The band also released another double live CD/DVD called Live in Europe in 2003; one standout is the version of "Suite Charlotte Pike" that includes covers of tracks from The Beatles Abbey Road album.

Though SMPT:e contained the 31-minute opus "All of the Above", the band's second studio album, 2001's Bridge Across Forever, found the band flexing their muscles further in the long form for which progressive rock is known. The CD contained just four tracks, the 26-minute "Duel With the Devil", the 14-minute "Suite Charlotte Pike", and the 26-minute "Stranger in Your Soul" making up the bulk of the disc, with the title track coming in at a relatively scant five minutes. The limited edition also contains a cover of Pink Floyd's "Shine on You Crazy Diamond". In November 2001, the band toured Europe. As an added bonus for progressive metal fans, Daniel Gildenlöw of the band Pain of Salvation sat in throughout the tour, playing keyboards, guitars, percussion, and vocals.

=== Years of hiatus (2002–2009) ===
Morse left his regular band Spock's Beard in October 2002, stating "God wants me to do something else," which meant leaving the mainstream prog scene to launch a new career as a Christian musician. This move also included ending his activities for Transatlantic. Portnoy reacted: "This spells the end of Transatlantic as I wouldn't possibly consider continuing it without him." A live DVD of the tour was released in late 2003.

In the years to follow Morse continued to collaborate with Portnoy both in the studio and on stage. Morse' concerts frequently included one or more Transatlantic songs. A three-quarter reunion took place on 23 August 2008, when Stolt and Portnoy joined Morse at the Three Rivers Prog Fest in Pittsburgh for "We All Need Some Light" and "Stranger in Your Soul".

=== Reunion and The Whirlwind (2009–2013) ===
On 16 April 2009, it was officially announced that the band had reunited and begun work on a third studio album. The album was released in October 2009 and consisted of a single 77-minute title-track The Whirlwind. A special edition of the album was also released, including a second disc with four additional original tracks and four cover tracks. Additionally, a deluxe edition was released, which included a DVD documenting the making of the album. The album reached No. 21 on the U.S. Billboard Heatseekers chart.

The band toured North America and Europe in April–May 2010 in support of The Whirlwind. Dubbed the Whirld Tour, the band was again joined by Daniel Gildenlöw on stage.

In February 2013, the new Neal Morse band (with Mike Portnoy) and the Flower Kings started a European tour together which was followed by a gig in Los Angeles in May. Each band performed a set with their own songs and the encore set featured Transatlantic songs performed by Morse, Portnoy and Stolt supported by members of the two bands with special guests Jonas Reingold and Randy George alternating on bass. The encore ends with eleven musicians on the stage.

On 10 March 2013, Pete Trewavas announced at the Marillion Weekend Convention in Port Zélande, the Netherlands, that he would be going to Nashville in the Summer to record new material with Transatlantic. Neal Morse confirmed this to DPRP.

=== Kaleidoscope (2014-2017) ===
On 30 May 2013, Mike Portnoy announced that they had finished writing a new Transatlantic album. It featured five songs (two epics and three 'normal length' ones) plus eight covers for the bonus disc. The album was released in January 2014. A world tour of the United States and Europe followed, including a performance on the "Progressive Nation at Sea" cruise created by Mike Portnoy. The band played two shows, with the first featuring the entire Kaleidoscope album and the second including guest performances by famous progressive rock artists such as Jon Anderson of Yes. On 11 September 2014, Kaleidoscope won Album of the Year at the third annual Progressive Music Awards.

On 7 February 2017, the band performed on the Cruise to the Edge, with Ted Leonard filling in for Roine Stolt, and Bill Hubauer filling in for Daniel Gildenlöw.

=== The Absolute Universe (2019–2022) ===
Transatlantic recorded its fifth album, The Absolute Universe, and released it on 5 February 2021.

On 5 June 2021, Mike Portnoy announced on his Twitter feed that Transatlantic would be playing at Morsefest 2022 outside of Nashville, TN on 29–30 April 2022 as a warmup gig for Cruise To The Edge. It was subsequently announced that both The Absolute Universe and The Whirlwind would be played in their entirety at these shows.

== Members ==
- Neal Morse – keyboard, vocals, guitar
- Mike Portnoy – drums, vocals
- Roine Stolt – guitar, vocals, keyboards
- Pete Trewavas – bass, vocals

=== Touring and guest members ===
- Daniel Gildenlöw – guitar, vocals, keyboards (2001 & 2010 tours, 2014 show, 2017 show)
- Ted Leonard – guitar, vocals, keyboards (2014 tour, 2017 show, 2022 tour)
- Bill Hubauer – guitar, vocals, keyboards (2017 show)

== Discography ==
=== Studio albums ===
Title	Album details	Peak chart positions								
Title	Album details	GER	FRA	NLD	SWE	SWI	AUT	FIN	JPN	UK
SMPT:e	Released: 21 March 2000; Label: Radiant/Metal Blade, Inside Out Music; Formats: CD, LP, digital download	50	—	—	—	—	—	—	—	—
Bridge Across Forever	Released: 9 October 2001; Label: Radiant/Metal Blade, Inside Out Music; Formats: CD, LP, digital download	56	98	—	—	—	—	—	—	—
The Whirlwind	Released: 23 October 2009; Label: Radiant/Metal Blade, Inside Out Music; Formats: CD, CD+DVD, LP, digital download	45	134	40	59	—	—	—	—	118
Kaleidoscope	Released: 27 January 2014; Label: Radiant/Metal Blade, Inside Out Music; Formats: CD, CD+DVD, LP, digital download	6	77	6	55	13	52	22	134	52
The Absolute Universe Forevermore + The Breath of Life	Released: 5 February 2021; Label: Sony Music, Inside Out Music; Formats: CD, CD+DVD, LP, digital download	3	83	4	32	3	—	29	—	56
"—" denotes a recording that did not chart or was not released in that territory.

=== Live albums ===
Title	Album details	Peak chart positions	
Title	Album details	GER	FRA
Live in America	Released: 12 March 2001; Label: Radiant/Metal Blade, Inside Out Music; Formats: CD, digital download	—	—
Live in Europe	Released: 4 November 2003; Label: Radiant/Metal Blade, Inside Out Music; Formats: CD	—	—
Whirld Tour 2010: Live in London	Released: 26 October 2010; Label: Radiant/Metal Blade, Inside Out Music; Formats: CD	52	196
More Never Is Enough: Live In Manchester & Tilburg 2010	Released: 25 October 2011; Label: Radiant/Metal Blade, Inside Out Music; Formats: CD	—	—
KaLIVEoscope	Released: 27 October 2014; Label: Radiant/Metal Blade, Inside Out Music; Formats: CD+DVD	45	—
The Final Flight: Live at L'Olympia	Released: 17 February 2023; Label: Radiant/Metal Blade, Inside Out Music; Formats: CD+BD, 4LP	—	—
Live at Morsefest 2022: The Absolute Whirlwind	Released: 26 April 2024; Label: Radiant/Metal Blade, Inside Out Music; Formats: CD	79	—
"—" denotes a recording that did not chart or was not released in that territory.

=== Other albums ===
Title	Album details
Transatlantic Demos by Neal Morse	Released: 2 April 2003; Label: Radiant; Formats: CD
SMPT:e - The Roine Stolt Mixes	Released: 2003; Label: Metal Blade; Formats: CD
The Whirlwind Demo	Released: 2012; Label: Radiant Records; Formats: CD
The Transatlantic Kaleidoscope Demos	Released: 2014; Label: Radiant Records; Formats: CD
Transatlantic: Live at Sweden Rock 2014 & Live at Wetlands Preserve NYC 2000	Released: 2020; Label: Radiant Records; Formats: CD
The Absolute Universe Demos	Released: 2021; Label: Radiant Records; Formats: CD

=== Video albums ===
Title	Album details	Peak chart positions	
Title	Album details	SWE	SWI
Live in America	Released: 2001; Label: Radiant/Metal Blade, Inside Out Music; Formats: VHS, DVD	—	—
Building the Bridge	Released: 2002; Label: Radiant Records; Formats: VHS, DVD	—	—
Live in Europe	Released: 25 November 2003; Label: Radiant/Metal Blade, Inside Out Music; Formats: DVD	—	—
The Official Bootleg DVD	Released: 2008; Label: Radiant/Metal Blade, Inside Out Music; Formats: DVD	—	—
Whirld Tour 2010: Live in London	Released: 25 October 2010; Label: Radiant/Metal Blade, Inside Out Music; Formats: DVD	13	7
More Never Is Enough: Live in Tilburg 2010	Released: 24 October 2011; Label: Radiant/Metal Blade, Inside Out Music; Formats: DVD	—	—
KaLIVEoscope	Released: 27 October 2014; Label: Radiant/Metal Blade, Inside Out Music; Formats: BD, CD+DVD+BD	5	—
The Final Flight: Live at L'Olympia	Released: 17 February 2023; Label: Radiant/Metal Blade, Inside Out Music; Formats: CD+BD	—	—
"—" denotes a recording that did not chart or was not released in that territory.
