= Anorak in the UK =

Live album by Marillion
- Released: 8 April 2002 (mail order, 2 discs); 22 April 2002 (retail, 1 disc)
- Recorded: 19–22 May 2001, Manchester Academy, Wolverhampton Civic Hall, London Forum
- Genre: Progressive rock
- Length: 70:24 (retail, 1 disc)
- Label: Racket Records (mail order, 2 discs); EMI
- Producer: Dave Meegan

Marillion chronology
Anoraknophobia (2001)	Anorak in the UK (2002)	The Best of Marillion (2003)

Anorak in the UK is a live album by Marillion released in April 2002 and documenting the previous year's Anoraknophobia tour. Most songs were recorded on three nights in May 2001 (Manchester Academy, 19 May, Wolverhampton Civic Hall, 20 May, London Forum, 22 May) using a mobile studio, while two tracks ("When I Meet God" and "This is the 21st Century") were recorded in front of a small private audience at the band's own studio after the October leg of the tour. The album was released in two versions: A two-disc set only distributed via Marillion's own mail-order business, and a one-disc retail edition distributed by EMI. Under this deal, EMI required the band to provide one exclusive song on the retail edition that would not be found on the two-disc version. The band chose "Easter" from 1989, as it is available on several previous official and semi-official live albums and therefore would not "force" fans to purchase both versions of the album. Anorak in the UK is Marillion's first official retail live album since Made Again (1996), and the second with Steve Hogarth. The title takes its cues from the Sex Pistols single "Anarchy in the U.K." and, self-mockingly, the British slang term anorak (a person with unfathomable interest in arcane, detailed information regarded as boring by the rest of the population) often applied to Marillion fans. The cover shows a crowd consisting of "Barry" featured on Anoraknophobia.

== Track listing ==
=== Two-disc version ===
==== Disc 1 ====
1. "Intro / Separated Out" (from Anoraknophobia, 2001) - 6:36
2. "Rich" (from marillion.com, 1999) - 5:36
3. "Man of a Thousand Faces" (from This Strange Engine, 1997) - 7:51
4. "Quartz" (from Anoraknophobia, 2001) - 9:27
5. "Go!" (from marillion.com, 1999) - 6:13
6. "Map of the World" (from Anoraknophobia, 2001) - 5:04
7. "Out of This World" (from Afraid of Sunlight, 1995) - 7:09
8. "Afraid of Sunlight" (from Afraid of Sunlight, 1995) - 7:09
9. "Mad" (from Brave, 1994) - 5:28

==== Disc 2 ====
1. "Between You and Me" (from Anoraknophobia, 2001) - 6:11
2. "The Great Escape" (from Brave, 1994) - 6:10
3. "If My Heart Were a Ball it Would Roll Uphill" (from Anoraknophobia, 2001) - 9:22
4. "Waiting to Happen" (from Holidays in Eden, 1991) - 5:55
5. "The Answering Machine" (from Radiation, 1998) - 2:59
6. "King" (from Afraid of Sunlight, 1995) - 8:41
7. "This is the 21st Century" (from Anoraknophobia, 2001) - 10:17
8. "When I Meet God" (from Anoraknophobia, 2001) - 10:08

=== One-disc version ===
1. "Intro / Separated Out" – 6:36 (from Anoraknophobia, 2001)
2. "Quartz" – 9:27 (from Anoraknophobia, 2001)
3. "Map of the World" – 5:04 (from Anoraknophobia, 2001)
4. "Out of This World" – 7:09 (from Afraid of Sunlight, 1995)
5. "Between You and Me" – 6:11 (from Anoraknophobia, 2001)
6. "The Great Escape" – 5:56 (from Brave, 1994)
7. "King" – 7:48 (from Afraid of Sunlight, 1995)
8. "If My Heart Were a Ball it Would Roll Uphill" – 9:22 (from Anoraknophobia, 2001)
9. "Waiting To Happen" – 5:43 (from Holidays in Eden, 1991)
10. "Easter" – 7:03 (from Seasons End, 1989)

== Personnel ==
- Steve Hogarth – vocals
- Steve Rothery – guitars
- Mark Kelly – keyboards
- Pete Trewavas – bass
- Ian Mosley – drums
