= Anoraknophobia =

Studio album by Marillion
- Released: 7 May 2001
- Recorded: The Racket Club, Buckinghamshire
- Genre: Alternative rock
- Length: 63:31
- Label: Liberty
- Producer: Dave Meegan

Marillion chronology
marillion.com (1999)	Anoraknophobia (2001)	Anorak in the UK (2002)

Singles from Anoraknophobia
- 1. "Between You and Me" / "Map of the World" Released: 10 September 2001

Anoraknophobia is the 12th studio album by the British rock band Marillion, released in 2001. It is regarded as the first instance of a music recording completely financed by fans in a then-unique fundraising campaign, as 12,674 copies were pre-ordered before the album was even recorded.

In an attempt to depart from their neo-prog past for a contemporary sound, Marillion introduced elements of rap, groove, funk, trip hop, blues, jazz and dub. Although the album received several favourable reviews, it was not a significant commercial success, and its sole single, "Between You and Me", did not chart. The group supported Anoraknophobia with a six-month European tour.

== Background ==
In February 1997, when Marillion prepared for a European tour in support of their ninth studio album, This Strange Engine, Mark Kelly announced on the Internet that the group would not visit North America due to insufficient support from their American record label, Red Ant. Then, devoted fans launched a fundraising drive and raised $50,000 to help their favourite band cross the Atlantic. Alliance Entertainment, Red Ant's parent company, filed for bankruptcy in July and tried to sell the label. As a result, an additional $15,000 (money that would have come from Red Ant) was raised for a 21-date North American tour, the band's largest since 1991. The whole idea, known as crowdfunding, was conceived and realised by fans without any involvement from the band, and although music lovers had always backed their favourite performers in various ways, such a successful Internet campaign was unprecedented.

After releasing marillion.com in October 1999, Marillion had completed a three-album contract with Castle Communications. Although a number of independent labels were interested in signing the band, its members wanted to have total control of their music and still be able to use distribution facilities of a major record company. This could only be achieved if the money to create an album was obtained from a different source, and Marillion found an unusual solution, crowdfunding.

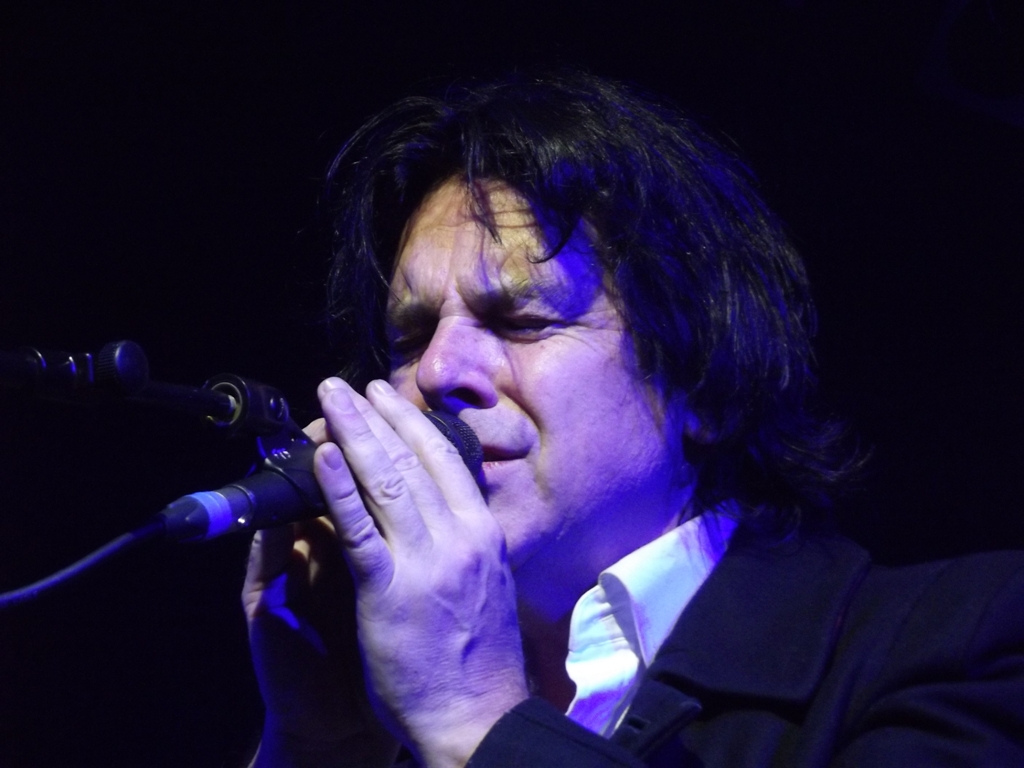
Appealing for money to record the album, Steve Hogarth wrote an e-mail which stated "...how would you guys feel about buying a record we haven't made yet – because if you did we'd be really grateful...".

"We couldn't have done what we've just done without the internet. We could have put 20,000 letters in the post, but it would have taken a month and cost a fortune."

— Steve Hogarth discussing the significance of the Internet to the album's pre-order venture

As they had already learnt of the dedication of the fanbase which had underwritten the North American tour, the band sent e-mails to over 30,000 people who subscribed to their website, asking whether they would buy an unrecorded album. Within two days there were around 6,000 positive replies; ultimately, 12,674 copies were pre-ordered. The process raised more than £150,000 (£282,000 in 2015 pounds), more than an advance the band might have received from an ordinary record contract. A worldwide marketing and distribution deal was concluded with EMI, and the album would be released for retail by their Liberty Records imprint.

This innovative pre-order venture was unexpectedly successful. Anoraknophobia is claimed by Marillion to have been the first crowdfunded album in the music industry though former vocalist Fish had crowdfunded an album, Candlelight In Fog the year before.

== Recording ==
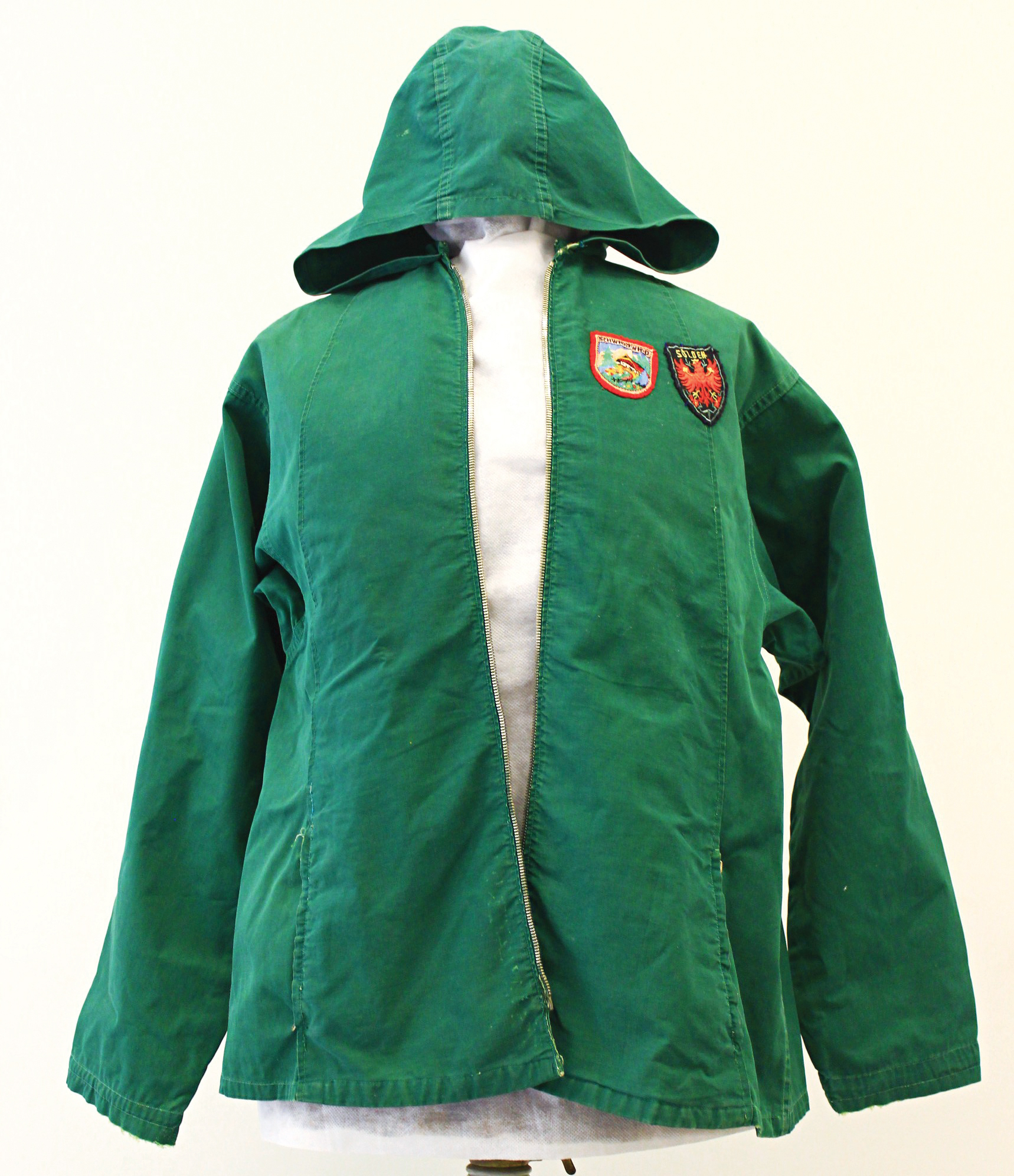
Marillion's fans are known among themselves as "anoraks" (a common British term for a raincoat)

Anoraknophobia was written, recorded and mixed at Marillion's own Racket Club studio in Buckinghamshire, England, for the whole of 2000 and early 2001. To work on the album, the band chose Dave Meegan who had previously been an assistant engineer on Fugazi (1984) and had produced their last two recordings with EMI, Brave (1994) and Afraid of Sunlight (1995). Stewart Every assisted at mixing of the album.

Bassist Pete Trewavas, said the band had not had any tracks left over from previous sessions which could have been used, so the entire album was written "from scratch". Since they had been unfashionable in the eyes of the media and had been largely ignored by the music press, Marillion deliberately attempted to create a modern sound and distance themselves further from their neo-prog past. In an interview with the BBC, Hogarth spoke about the band's new musical direction and the album's diverse influences: "With this album there's been a massive invasion of black influence–there's rap, there's groove, there's funk, there's trip hop, blues, jazz, dub." Thus, the songs "Between You and Me" and "Map of the World" have drawn comparisons to U2, while the nine-minute "Quartz", which contains a rap section, has been compared to the sound of Massive Attack.

All the samples in "Separated Out" were taken from Tod Browning's horror film Freaks (1932). The line "Freaks!... Freaks!... Freaks!" at the ending of the track was used as a reference to Marillion's fans who sometimes refer to themselves as "freaks" after a Fish-era B-side. The phrase "She was only dreaming" in the song "If My Heart Were a Ball It Would Roll Uphill" is a sample from "Chelsea Monday".

According to Hogarth, the title, nominally a play on the word "arachnophobia", or fear of spiders, means no fear of anoraks ("anorak no phobia"), referring to the long-running in-joke that Marillion fans are also sometimes called anoraks. The artwork for Anoraknophobia as well as some other related music releases and press materials feature cartoon graphics of a boy named Barry who wears a rain parka. Inside the liner notes for the pre-order edition of the album, there is a photograph of each of the band members posed in a similar manner and standing near a telephone box.

== Release ==
All who pre-ordered Anoraknophobia received a special 48-page digibook edition with a bonus enhanced disc (Note: Intact 12674). Those who pre-ordered before a set date also got their names printed in the booklet. First copies of the album were sent out on 23 April 2001, and since the end of the pre-order campaign the special edition has not been in print. The bonus disc contains the song "Number One" which has not been released. At one point considered for the album, it was put aside because it did not match the rest of the recording sonically. The standard edition of Anoraknophobia (Note: Liberty 7243 532321 2 2) was released on 7 May 2001 through Liberty Records. As part of a series of Marillion reissues on the Madfish label, a division of Snapper Music, Anoraknophobia was re-released in 2012 in two variants: 1) compact disc packaged in a deluxe digibook featuring extra artwork (Note: Madfish SMACD991), and 2) double heavyweight (180gm) vinyl in a gatefold sleeve (Note: Madfish SMALP991).

The album was ineligible to chart in the UK for two reasons. First, its pre-order sales were direct through the band's website and as such could not be counted independently; second, the retail version contained a sticker of Barry within the jewel case. This was considered a gift that might serve as an inducement to buy the album, even though purchasers would not be aware of its inclusion until they opened the album. In mainland Europe, Anoraknophobia was not a chart success and has stayed among the lowest selling albums in the Marillion catalogue.

Prior to the album 23 February 2001, an edited version of "This is the 21st Century" was made available free for download on MP3.com, and was downloaded enough to achieve No.1 in the alternative chart.

The only single from the album, a double A-side "Between You and Me" / "Map of the World", was released on 10 September 2001 and did not chart. It was available exclusively via the band's website and was sold with an additional free copy along with a letter and biography provided by Marillion. The fans who bought the single were asked to pass the free copy to their local radio stations to encourage its airplay. Radio edits of the two songs were used in April 2001 as a two-track promo sampler.

=== Remixomatosis ===
In 2003, Marillion launched an experimental contest to remix the content of the album and the song "Number One". Anyone interested could buy a copy of the master tapes and rebuild the tracks at one's own discretion. Selected winners from over 500 participants were awarded a cash prize and their remixes were included on a double album which was released in August 2004 by Racket Records as Remixomatosis (Note: Racket RACKET24).

== Critical reception ==
Professional ratings
Review scores
Source	Rating
AllMusic	3/5 stars
Classic Rock	4/5 stars
Kerrang!	4/5 stars
Q	2/5 stars

As Marillion had constantly met the hostility of the music press, in a press release for Anoraknophobia, Hogarth said:

This is an important and contemporary album that is light years removed from anything the band have created in their past. It deserves to be reviewed in a manner that is both accurate and fair. So, our challenge to you is to firstly listen to the album. Then write a review without using any of the following words: 'Progressive rock', 'Genesis', 'Fish', 'heavy metal', 'dinosaurs', 'predictable', 'concept album'. Because if you do, we'll know that you haven't listened to it".

"The new album is indeed an excellent, contemporary sounding release. You’ve been trumpeting loudly for the past several years about cutting ties with the past, but to these ears Anoraknophobia is the first album to seriously validate any of those claims".

— Dave Ling commenting on the album in an interview with Hogarth

AllMusic reviewer Andrew Hamlin criticised the band for "high 'pricing' of their new project" and called the above-mentioned "challenge" imperious. He has admitted that "this odd poise of seeming to snap on feeding fingers carries over to the record on several levels". Philip Wilding of Classic Rock magazine rated the album four stars out of five and described it as "a collection full of grace and tenacity, thoughtful and thought provoking and not without moments of real clarity and beauty". Hogarth was complimented for his vocals which had "rarely sounded better". In the opinion of Catherine Chambers from Kerrang! magazine, it was shocking that Anoraknophobia, conjuring up "a pretty contemporary feel with its classy mix of blues, country, and even trip-hop stylings" proved to be "actually pretty damn good" after Marillion had delivered many poorly received recordings. Stuart Maconie was more critical of the album in his review for Q magazine, awarding it just two stars out of five. He wrote: "Steve Hogarth is way funkier than Fish but the tone is still as arch and self-important as a lower-sixth poetry mag". He praised "Between You and Me", comparing it favourably with Crowded House and U2, but criticised the band for musical self-indulgence, especially on the 11-minute "This is the 21st Century". Maconie concluded: "Clearly Marillion can play. If only they wouldn't play so much of it".

== Tour ==
To promote the album, Marillion immediately launched their Anoraknophobia tour across Europe. Lasting from 4 May until 26 October 2001, and including 39 performances, it consisted of the spring leg (from 4 May to 6 June 16 concerts), appearances at two summer festivals in Switzerland (21 and 22 June), and the autumn leg (from 15 September to 26 October 21 concerts). Recordings drawn from three UK shows in May were documented on the live album Anorak in the UK (2002). For the October leg of the tour, the band held a vote, asking fans what they would like to hear played. The final set lists were largely based on the results.

=== Marillion Weekend 2015 ===
Anoraknophobia was played live in its entirety during Friday night shows of the Marillion Weekend 2015 events, which took place in the Netherlands, the UK, and Canada. In November 2016, three separate 2-CD albums commemorating the concerts recorded at Center Parcs village Port Zelande in the Netherlands during 20–22 March 2015 were released. The Blu-Ray and DVD sets Out of the Box hit the stores a month later.

== Track listing ==
All lyrics are written by Steve Hogarth, except "Map of the World" by Hogarth and Nick Van Eede; all music is composed by Marillion.

No.	Title	Length
1.	"Between You and Me"	6:27
2.	"Quartz"	9:08
3.	"Map of the World"	5:01
4.	"When I Meet God"	9:16
5.	"The Fruit of the Wild Rose"	6:58
6.	"Separated Out"	6:15
7.	"This Is the 21st Century"	11:05
8.	"If My Heart Were a Ball It Would Roll Uphill"	9:30
Total length:		63:31

Pre-order edition bonus disc
No.	Title	Length
1.	"Number One"	2:48
2.	"Fruit of the Wild Rose" (demo)	6:20
3.	"Separated Out" (demo)	6:04
4.	"Between You and Me" (Mark Kelly remix)	5:08
5.	"Number One" (enhanced video, recording demo)
6.	"Map of the World" (enhanced video, recording demo)
Total length:		20:20

- The total length for the pre-order edition bonus disc is shown for the audio only part.

== Personnel ==
Credits are adapted from the album's 2001 and 2012 liner notes.

=== Marillion ===
- Steve Hogarth – vocals, additional piano and percussion
- Steve Rothery – guitars
- Mark Kelly – keyboards
- Pete Trewavas – bass, additional guitar (on "When I Meet God") and vocals
- Ian Mosley – drums

=== Additional musicians ===
- Stephanie Sobey-Jones – cello

=== Technical personnel ===
- Dave Meegan – production, recording, mixing (at The Racket Club, Buckinghamshire)
- Stewart Every – mixing (at The Racket Club, Buckinghamshire)
- Simon Heyworth – mastering (at Chop 'Em Out, London)
- Carl Glover – booklet graphic design
- Matt Curtis – outer cover graphics
- Jill Furmanovsky – photography
- Fernando Aceves – photography

== Charts ==
Chart (2001)	Peak position
Dutch Albums (Album Top 100)	67
French Albums (SNEP)	62
German Albums (Offizielle Top 100)	42
