= Man of a Thousand Faces (song) =

Single by Marillion

from the album This Strange Engine
- Released: 2 June 1997
- Recorded: 1996
- Studio: The Racket Club, Buckinghamshire, England
- Genre: Neo-prog
- Length: 3:37 (radio edit)
- Label: Raw Power
- Composer(s): Marillion
- Lyricist(s): Steve Hogarth, John Helmer
- Producer(s): Marillion

Marillion singles chronology
"Beautiful" (1995)	"Man of a Thousand Faces" (1997)	"Eighty Days" (1997)

"Man of a Thousand Faces" is the lead single from British neo-prog band Marillion's ninth studio album This Strange Engine, released on 2 June 1997 by Castle Communications imprint Raw Power. It was the band's first single since they departed from EMI Records in 1995. Reflecting the decline in popularity for Marillion, the song reached only the number 98 on the UK Singles Chart. A music video was created for "Man of a Thousand Faces".

== Track listing ==
All music is composed by Marillion

No.	Title	Lyrics	Length
1.	"Man of a Thousand Faces" (radio edit)	Steve Hogarth, John Helmer	3:37
2.	"Beautiful" (unplugged version)	Hogarth	4:50
3.	"Made Again" (unplugged version)	Helmer	5:15
4.	"Man of a Thousand Faces" (extended version)	Hogarth, Helmer	8:19
Total length:			22:03

== Personnel ==
=== Marillion ===
- Steve Hogarth – vocals
- Steve Rothery – guitar
- Pete Trewavas – bass
- Mark Kelly – keyboards
- Ian Mosley – drums, percussion

=== Additional musicians ===
- Charlton & Newbottle School Choir – choir

=== Technical personnel ===
- Stewart Every – engineer
- Dave Meegan – mixing engineer
- Andrew Gent – artwork
- Hugh Gilmour – art direction, design

== Charts ==
Chart (1997)	Peak position
UK Singles (OCC)	98
