= A Singles Collection =

Compilation album by Marillion
- Released: 8 June 1992
- Recorded: 1982–92
- Genre: Neo-prog; pop rock
- Label: EMI (Europe); I.R.S. Records (United States)
- Producer: Nick Tauber; Chris Kimsey; Chris Neil; Nick Davis

Marillion chronology
Holidays in Eden (1991)	A Singles Collection (1992)	Brave (1994)

Professional ratings
Review scores
Source	Rating
Allmusic	4.5/5 stars

A Singles Collection (released as Six of One, Half-Dozen of the Other in the U.S.) is a compilation album of Marillion singles from both the Fish era and the Steve Hogarth era, celebrating the band's ten-year jubilee (taking 1982, when their debut single was released, as the starting point). It includes the band's six most successful singles of the Fish era, plus all six Steve Hogarth singles up to that year.

The tracks on it are not ordered chronologically, unlike on the later compilations The Best of Both Worlds (1997) and The Best of Marillion (2003) that likewise cover both vocalists' eras. Additionally, it contains two new recordings with Hogarth on vocals, "I Will Walk on Water" and a cover version of the Rare Bird song "Sympathy". This was also released as a single, which peaked at no. 16 in the UK Singles Chart (May 1992), making it the band's highest-charting single between 1987 and 2004. In August 1992, "No One Can", a re-packaged version of the August 1991 single from Holidays in Eden, was released as the second single, peaking at no. 26 (original version no. 33).

== Track listing ==
No.	Title	Writer(s)	Original source	Length
1.	"Cover My Eyes (Pain & Heaven)"	Steve Hogarth, Mark Kelly, Ian Mosley, Steve Rothery, Pete Trewavas	Holidays in Eden (1991)	3:55
2.	"Kayleigh" (7-inch version)	Derek Dick, Kelly, Mosley, Rothery, Trewavas	Misplaced Childhood (1985)	3:32
3.	"Easter"	Hogarth, Kelly, Mosley, Rothery, Trewavas	Seasons End (1989)	5:56
4.	"Warm Wet Circles" (7" single remix by Nick Davis)	Dick, Kelly, Mosley, Rothery, Trewavas	Clutching at Straws (1987)	4:22
5.	"Uninvited Guest" (7-inch version)	Hogarth, Kelly, Mosley, Rothery, Trewavas, John Helmer	Seasons End (1989)	3:43
6.	"Assassing" (1992 remix by Chris Hedge)	Dick, Kelly, Mosley, Rothery, Trewavas	Fugazi (1984)	7:39
7.	"Hooks in You"	Hogarth, Kelly, Mosley, Rothery, Trewavas, John Helmer	Seasons End (1989)	2:54
8.	"Garden Party" (1992 remix by Chris Hedge)	Dick, Kelly, Mick Pointer, Rothery, Trewavas, Diz Minnitt, Brian Jelliman	Script for a Jester's Tear (1983)	7:09
9.	"No One Can"	Hogarth, Kelly, Mosley, Rothery, Trewavas, John Helmer	Holidays in Eden (1991)	4:40
10.	"Incommunicado"	Dick, Kelly, Mosley, Rothery, Trewavas	Clutching at Straws (1987)	5:14
11.	"Dry Land"	Hogarth, Colin Woore	Holidays in Eden (1991)	4:41
12.	"Lavender" (7-inch)	Dick, Kelly, Mosley, Rothery, Trewavas	Misplaced Childhood (1985)	3:40
13.	"I Will Walk on Water"	Hogarth, Kelly, Mosley, Rothery, Trewavas	1992 Recording, previously unreleased	4:11
14.	"Sympathy"	Mark Ashton, Graham Stansfield, David Kaffinetti, Stephen Gould	1992 Recording, previously unreleased; Rare Bird cover	3:27

== Personnel ==
- Fish – vocals on tracks 2, 4, 6, 8, 10, 12
- Steve Hogarth – vocals on tracks 1, 3, 5, 7, 9, 11, 13, 14
- Steve Rothery – guitars
- Mark Kelly – keyboards
- Pete Trewavas – bass
- Mick Pointer – drums on track 8
- Ian Mosley – drums on tracks 1–7, 9–14
