= Thankyou Whoever You Are =

"Thankyou Whoever You Are / Most Toys"

Single by Marillion

from the album Somewhere Else
- Released: 11 June 2007
- Recorded: 2006
- Genre: Progressive rock
- Label: Intact Records
- Songwriters: Steve Hogarth, Steve Rothery, Mark Kelly, Pete Trewavas, Ian Mosley
- Producer: Michael Hunter

Marillion singles chronology
"See It Like A Baby" (2007)	"Thankyou Whoever You Are" / "Most Toys" (2007)	"Carol of the Bells" (2013)

"Thankyou Whoever You Are" and "Most Toys" are songs recorded by British neo-prog band Marillion which appeared on their 14th studio album, Somewhere Else. They were released on a double A-side single in the United Kingdom and in the Netherlands in June 2007. "Thankyou" is a slow, slightly orchestral ballad arranged in the band's trademark style. In stark contrast, "Most Toys" is simple, rocky and fast, with an anti-consumerism message. It has a running time of 2:49, one of the band's shortest recordings to date, along with the musically similar "Hooks in You" from 1989).

To maximize the purchase incentive for fans and spur potential chart success, the single came in three physical formats (including a PAL-only DVD) featuring different exclusive tracks each (including two non-album tracks), with the second A-side "Most Toys" only being available on two of them. In addition, live versions of both tracks were included in an iTunes download.

The single spent one week in the UK Singles Chart, reaching number 15 on 23 June 2007. This makes it the band's second biggest success in the two decades since the release of "Incommunicado" (1987) in terms of peak position. On the Dutch singles charts, the release was more successful, running three weeks and peaking at Number 6. In terms of peak position, this made it the band's biggest hit ever in that country, as even their otherwise most popular hits from the 1980s, such as "Kayleigh", "Lavender", and "Incommunicado", had not made the top ten there.

The DVD format contains an audio version of the Britney Spears dance-pop hit "Toxic" recorded live on an evening of cover versions during a 2007 fanclub convention in the Center Parcs holiday resort of Port Zelande, Ouddorp, Netherlands, in early February 2007.

In total, "Thankyou Whoever You Are" marks Marillion's 35th and, as of 2013, last physical or digital single containing original material. For the three studio albums released since then, individual tracks have been used for promotional purposes (YouTube, radio airplay) but have not been made available for purchase.

== Track list ==
Thankyou Whoever You Are
A sample of the chorus section of "Thankyou Whoever You Are", featuring Marillion's signature anthemic style.

Most Toys
A sample of the chorus section of "Most Toys", featuring the band's lesser known rockier side.

=== Two-track CD single ===
1. "Thankyou Whoever You Are" (Edit) — 4:06 original version from Somewhere Else
2. "Say The Word" — 5:14 non-album track

=== Four-track CD single ===
1. "Thankyou Whoever You Are" (Edit) — 4:06
2. "Most Toys" — 2:49 from Somewhere Else
3. "Circular Ride" — 3:54 non-album track
4. "The Wound (Live)" — 7:14 original version from Somewhere Else

=== DVD single ===
1. "Thankyou Whoever You Are" (Edit) — 4:06
2. "Most Toys" — 2:49
3. "Toxic" (Live) — 4:49
4. "Thankyou Whoever You Are" (Live Video) — 4:57
5. "Most Toys" (Live Video) — 2:57

=== iTunes download ===
1. "Thankyou Whoever You Are" (Live)
2. "Most Toys" (Live)

All tracks written by Marillion (Hogarth, Kelly, Rothery, Trewavas, Mosley), except "Toxic", written by Cathy Dennis, Henrik Jonback, Christian Karlsson, Pontus Winnberg.

== Personnel ==
- Steve Hogarth – vocals
- Mark Kelly – keyboards
- Ian Mosley – drums
- Steve Rothery – guitar
- Pete Trewavas – bass guitar
- Gary Good - saxophone
- Dave Littlejohn - trombone

== Chart positions ==
Chart (2007)	Peak position
UK Singles Chart	15
Dutch Singles Chart	6
