= Hooks in You =

Single by Marillion

from the album Seasons End
- Released: 28 August 1989
- Genre: Hard rock, pop rock
- Length: 2:57
- Label: EMI
- Songwriters: John Helmer, Steve Hogarth, Mark Kelly, Ian Mosley, Steve Rothery, Pete Trewavas
- Producers: Nick Davis & Marillion

Marillion singles chronology
"Freaks (live)" (1988)	"Hooks in You" (1989)	"The Uninvited Guest" (1989)

Audio sample
- file; help

"Hooks in You" is the first single from British rock band Marillion's fifth album Seasons End, released in 1989. It was the first single to feature lead singer Steve Hogarth, who joined the band the same year, replacing Fish.

"Hooks in You" peaked at #30 on the UK Singles Chart, the highest-charting single from Seasons End and the band's twelfth consecutive top 40 hit since 1983.

7 September 1989 Marillion performed the single at Top of the Pops.

== Overview ==
Written as a single, "Hooks in You" is a departure from the progressive rock slant of most of Seasons End, featuring a more straightforward hard rock sound. In the liner notes of Marillion's 1992 compilation album A Singles Collection (Six of One, Half-Dozen of the Other in the US), Steve Hogarth discussed how the song came about:

February '89. The Music Farm. The days were spent jamming in the studio and drinking fresh coffee in the lounge next door. On one such afternoon I was wrestling with the cafetiere plunger when I heard that guitar riff coming through the wall. I was perusing a fax from the ever-creative John Helmer and there was this line "when the fear gets a hook in you..." The song unfolded in my head, right there and then and, in about an hour, we had the basic structure nailed. We all wondered whether it was too "straight ahead" but always liked its attitude.

The b-side featured the predominantly acoustic ballad "After Me", which would also appear as a bonus track on the CD version of Seasons End. A slightly longer version of the title track, the "Meaty Mix", is included on the 12" and CD single.

A music video was released for this single, featuring the band performing the song before a crowd at the Brixton Academy.

== Track listing ==
=== 7" and cassette version ===
Side 1

1. "Hooks in You" (7" mix) – 2:55

Side 2

1. "After Me" - 3:21

=== 12" and CD versions ===
Side 1

1. "Hooks in You" (Meaty Mix) – 3:53

Side 2

1. "Hooks in You" (7" mix) – 2:55
2. "After Me" – 3:21

== Chart positions ==
Chart (1989)	Position
UK Singles Chart	30
U.S. Billboard Mainstream Rock Tracks	49
Dutch GfK chart	58
German Singles Chart	71

== Personnel ==
- Steve Hogarth – vocals
- Steve Rothery – guitars
- Mark Kelly – keyboards
- Pete Trewavas – bass
- Ian Mosley – drums
