= Radiation (album) =

Studio album by Marillion
- Released: 18 September 1998 (Japan); 21 September 1998 (UK)
- Recorded: November 1997 – June 1998
- Studio: The Racket Club (Buckinghamshire, England)
- Genre: Neo-prog
- Length: 48:33 (Note: Raw Power RAW CD 126, GSA0000126RAW)
- Label: Raw Power
- Producer: Marillion; Stewart Every

Marillion chronology
This Strange Engine (1997)	Radiation (1998)	marillion.com (1999)

Alternative cover
- Radiation 2013

Singles from Radiation
- 1. "These Chains" Released: 14 September 1998

Singles from Radiation
- 1. "These Chains" Released: 14 September 1998

Professional ratings
Review scores
Source	Rating
AllMusic	3/5 stars

Radiation is the tenth studio album by the British neo-prog band Marillion, released in 1998. Recorded at The Racket Club between November 1997 and June 1998, it was co-produced and mixed by Stewart Every. The album was remixed by Michael Hunter in September to November 2012 and a reissued remastered version was released in 2013.

== Background ==
For this album the band decided to experiment with different instrument tones, vocal effects, samples (making transitions between songs by cutting and pasting pieces from elsewhere in the album), and the like. As the album recording progressed, there was "a desire for new sounds and a desire not to repeat ourselves and to fall into familiar patterns", according to guitarist Steve Rothery.

The first element was that Rothery decided he wanted a different guitar sound. They placed a ban on digital delay and chorus which had been Rothery's sound for years. He borrowed a Gretsch from Dave Gregory, and played on a Harmony guitar on the bluesy "Born To Run". Mark Kelly used a new Roland JP8000, a virtual analogue synth which was very versatile, and he placed a ban on string synths. Pete Trewavas used quite a lot of his old Rickenbacker fuzz bass on the album.

During the recording sessions, the tracks "Tumble Down the Years" and "Interior Lulu" were recorded and mixed, but it was decided to leave them for the next album, marillion.com (1999), as the band thought the songs were incomplete.

They also tried a different approach to mixing that left certain fans criticise the production quality of the album. Rothery said: "I wanted to completely remix it. I think it’s an album with good material, poorly mixed. Sonically it’s a bit flat."

Drummer Ian Mosley said: "We tried to step outside ourselves, it sounds like a second rate version of who we were trying to copy. It backfired. I found it too harsh, not musical enough."

The entire album was significantly remixed 14 years later by Michael Hunter to give a different perspective and rectify many of those complaints.

For the first time ever on tour there were no Fish-era songs in the setlist. "We are playing our most recent material really which is six albums worth" claimed Mark Kelly at the time.

Marillion recorded a promo video for the single "These Chains". Hogarth said in 1998: "Well, essentially the idea of the video was to put me down in a well. Water is dropping on me and the idea is that as a consequence of the water raining into the well the level of the water subsequently rises and I climb to freedom in the end. So it was a metaphor for being trapped only to find that what trapped you released you. So that was it in its simpliest terms. What it amounts to really was me standing in a lot of cold water all day."

== Release ==
Radiation was released in Europe on 21 September 1998 by the Castle Communications imprint Raw Power. It was the second of the three recordings Marillion made on a contract with Castle Communications between being dropped by EMI Records in 1995 and eventually going independent in the 2000s. Due to an announcement on the band's official website before the release, the album's title had been incorrectly listed as either Don't Try This at Home or Radiation Leak. As Marillion's tenth studio album, the number 10 can be seen in the "io" in both "marillion" and "radiation" on the front cover.

The album peaked at number 35 in the UK charts and stayed there for just one week, making it the last Marillion album to enter the Top 40 until Somewhere Else (2007). The only single released from Radiation was "These Chains" which stalled at number 78 in the UK Singles Chart.

In the autumn of 2012, Radiation was remixed by Michael Hunter, and re-released in March 2013 by Madfish as a 2CD deluxe edition (Note: Madfish SMACD996) containing both the original and the new mixes as well as featuring re-designed artwork by Carl Glover. In July 2013, Hunter's mix was issued on double 180gm heavyweight translucent blue vinyl (Note: Madfish SMALP996). Some of the remixed tracks are shorter because the cut-and-paste reprises were eliminated (see track listing below), making the 2013 version almost two minutes shorter than the original.

== Track listing ==
All lyrics are written by Steve Hogarth; all music is composed by Marillion.

No.	Title	Length
1.	"Costa del Slough"	1:27 / 0:45
2.	"Under the Sun"	4:10 / 4:52
3.	"The Answering Machine"	3:48 / 3:45
4.	"Three Minute Boy"	5:59 / 5:58
5.	"Now She'll Never Know"	4:59 / 4:48
6.	"These Chains"	4:50 / 4:50
7.	"Born to Run"	5:12 / 5:06
8.	"Cathedral Wall"	7:20 / 6:27
9.	"A Few Words for the Dead"	10:32 / 10:25
Total length:		48:33 / 46:57

US bonus tracks
No.	Title	Writer(s)	Length
10.	"Estonia" (acoustic studio version)		6:43
11.	"Memory of Water" (Big Beat mix)	Hogarth, Rothery, Mark Kelly, Pete Trewavas, Ian Mosley, Helmer	8:08
Total length:			63:27

Japan bonus tracks
No.	Title	Writer(s)	Length
10.	"The Space"	Hogarth, Rothery, Trewavas, Kelly, Mosley, Colin Woore, Geoff Dugmore, Fergus Harper	4:13
11.	"Fake Plastic Trees"	Colin Greenwood, Ed O'Brien, Jonny Greenwood, Philip Selway, Thom Yorke	4:58

- The Japan bonus tracks are live acoustic versions taken from Unplugged at the Walls (1999) released by Racket Records. The latter is also featured as a B-side of the single "These Chains".

== Personnel ==
Credits are adapted from the album's 2013 liner notes.

Marillion

- Steve Hogarth – vocals, additional piano and percussion
- Steve Rothery – guitars
- Mark Kelly – keyboards and backing vocals
- Pete Trewavas – bass, acoustic guitar (on "Now She'll Never Know") and backing vocals
- Ian Mosley – drums and percussion

Additional musicians

- Erik Nielsen – backing vocals
- Jo Rothery – additional backing vocals (on "Three Minute Boy")
- Viki Price – additional backing vocals (on "Three Minute Boy")

Technical personnel

- Stewart Every – co-production, engineering and mixing (at The Forge, Oswestry, Shropshire, England) (original 1998 mix)
- Michael Hunter – mixing (2013 remix)
- Carl Glover – photography and graphic design
- Niels van Iperen – portrait photography

== Charts ==
Album

Chart (1998)	Peak position
Dutch Albums (Album Top 100)	26
French Albums (SNEP)	56
German Albums (Offizielle Top 100)	46
Scottish Albums (OCC)	63
UK Albums (OCC)	35
UK Independent Albums (OCC)	2
UK Rock & Metal Albums (OCC)	1

"These Chains"

Chart (1998)	Peak position
UK Singles (OCC)	78

== Release history ==
Region	Date	Label	Format	Catalog
Japan	18 September 1998	Canyon International	CD	PCCY-01281
Europe	21 September 1998	Raw Power	CD	RAW CD 126, GSA0000126RAW
United States	27 October 1998	Velvel	CD	63467-79760-2
Worldwide	March 2013	Madfish	2CD	SMACD996
Worldwide	July 2013	Madfish	2LP	SMALP996
