= How We Live =

English pop duo

How We Live were an English pop duo active in the mid- to late 1980s. The band was a project between singer/keyboard player Steve Hogarth and guitarist Colin Woore, who had both previously been members of the new wave band The Europeans.

How We Live released one album, Dry Land, in 1987, but it failed to meet with commercial success and the four singles released from the album failed to chart. Though the album has had two CD reissues with different extra tracks, the 12" remix of "Working Girl" is still only available on vinyl. The band subsequently split and Hogarth would go on to replace Fish as Marillion's vocalist in 1989.

Marillion covered the title track of Dry Land on their 1991 album Holidays in Eden and released it as the third single from the album. The verse melody of an unreleased How We Live song titled "Simon's Car" was used for "Cover My Eyes (Pain and Heaven)", the first single from Holidays in Eden.

== Discography ==
All of How We Live's releases were in Europe only, on Portrait Records.

=== Albums ===
- Dry Land (1987) – released on LP, cassette and CD

1. "Working Girl"
2. "All the Time in the World"
3. "Dry Land"
4. "Games in Germany"
5. "India"
6. "The Rainbow Room"
7. "Lost at Sea"
8. "In the City"
9. "Working Town"
10. "A Beat in the Heart"

=== Non-album tracks ===
- "All the Time in the World" ("12 mix) – 12" and Esoteric Recordings CD album reissue (2016)
- "Working Girl" ("12 mix) – 12" single only
- "English Summer" – "Working Girl" 12" B-side and 2016 reissue
- "You Don't Need Anyone" – previously unreleased; Racket Records CD album reissue (2000)
- "Simon's Car" – previously unreleased; 2000 reissue

=== Singles ===
- 1986 "Working Town"/"India" (1986) – same album tracks on 7" and 12"
- 1986 "All the Time in the World" ("12 mix) and (7" mix)/"Lost at Sea" (1986) – tracks 2 and 3 on 7"
- 1987 "Working Girl" ("7/album mix)/"In the City" – 7"
  - 1987 "Working Girl" ("12 mix)/"In the City"/"English Summer" (1987) – 12"
- 1987 "Games in Germany"/"Lost at Sea"/"India" – album tracks; 2 and 3 on 7"

== Demos ==
In addition, How We Live recorded numerous other unreleased demos, including:

- "Emotional"
- "Feels Like Saturday"
- "In Between the Lines"
- "In the Middle of the Night"
- "Sun Shines in Your Eyes"
- "This Town"
- "We Don't Need to Be Lovers"
