= The Best of Marillion =

Greatest hits album by Marillion
- Released: 22 July 2003
- Recorded: 1982–2001
- Genre: Neo-prog
- Label: EMI
- Producer: Nick Tauber; Chris Kimsey; Chris Neil; Nick Davis; Dave Meegan

Marillion chronology
Anorak in the UK (2002)	The Best of Marillion (2003)	Marbles (2004)

Professional ratings
Review scores
Source	Rating
Allmusic	4/5 stars

The Best of Marillion is a compilation album from the band Marillion. The songs come from both the Fish era and Steve Hogarth era of the band. It was released in mainland Europe only.

It contains no previously unreleased material.

== Track listing ==
1. "Garden Party" (Edited Version) - 4:34
2. "Assassing" (7" Version) - 3:38
3. "Kayleigh" (Single Version) - 3:36
4. "Lavender" - 3:43
5. "Heart of Lothian" - 3:37
6. "Incommunicado" - 3:58
7. "Sugar Mice" (Radio Edit) - 5:01
8. "Warm Wet Circles" - 4:24
9. "Hooks in You" - 2:56
10. "Easter" (7" Edit) - 4:31
11. "Cover My Eyes"* (Pain & Heaven) - 3:54
12. "No One Can"* - 4:42
13. "Dry Land" (7" Edit) - 4:04
14. "Sympathy"* - 3:27
15. "Alone Again in the Lap of Luxury" (Radio Edit) - 4:28
16. "Beautiful" (Radio Edit) - 4:24
17. "Man of a Thousand Faces" - 3:36
18. "Between You and Me" (Mark Kelly Remix) - 4:13

All are single edits unless indicated with * which are album versions.

== Personnel ==
- Fish – vocals on tracks 1–8
- Steve Hogarth – vocals on tracks 9–18
- Steve Rothery – guitars
- Mark Kelly – keyboards
- Pete Trewavas – bass
- Mick Pointer – drums on track 1
- Ian Mosley – drums on tracks 2–18
