= Tales from the Engine Room =

Tales From the Engine Room

Remix album by Marillion and The Positive Light
- Released: January and June 1998
- Length: 58:56
- Label: Racket Records, Eagle

Tales From The Engine Room is a remix album of six of eight songs from Marillion's This Strange Engine. It was conducted by Marc Mitchell and Mark Daghorn of The Positive Light.

== Background ==
The album was produced at Aspect Of I Studios, Jersey, Channel Islands, from December 1996 to November 1997.

Mark Daghorn was a long-time Marillion fan and asked the band for permission to remix some of their songs. The band were delighted at what they heard, and gladly gave him the green light to remix their latest album This Strange Engine.

A 12 inch single with Memory of Water, was released prior to the release for the club scene. Tales From The Engine Room was first only released as a limited edition on Marillions own Racket Records 21 January 1998, and was later mastered at Abbey Road Studios by Peter Mew, who was also working with the Marillion Remasters series. With an additional remix of 80 Days, the album was eventually released worldwide on 22 June 1998 on Eagle Records.

Mitchell left the project and was replaced by Tony Turell (who played on Raingods with Zippos by Fish in 1999). Daghorn and Turell made the Big Beat Mix of Memory of Water, as The Silent Buddhas. This version was released on the These Chains CD-single in 1998.

Steve Hogarth's liner notes on the CD:

"Vows.

We vowed we'd never let anyone do this.

I'd heard reconstruction's and remixes before and it seemed to me that the purpose of the artform, at best, was to produce some kind of cerebral trip, attained through dance in the tribal sense ... often with a bit of help from `substances´. At worst, though, I thought it was just a way of imposing a dance rhythm to a previously arranged song in order to hit another market and make money.

When Mark Daghorn succeeded in breaking down the closed doors and playing "Positive Light" to us, we thought again. PL seemed to have an element in their work that we hadn't often heard on the genre before... - depth of emotion, empathy, soul or whatever you want to call something which elevates music above mere entertainment. We packed him off back to Jersey with a lead vocal, and a guitar sample from "Estonia". A month or so later, he appeared at my door and played to me "Positive Light"s reconstruction... and I love it. We all loved it. And so the experiment was born. If, like me, you're intimate with Marillion's original, it takes a while to get your head away from that and get into this. There's even an argument for hearing this album first! The reconstruction of the title track, "This Strange Engine" reduced me to tears. I would advice you to listen to it on a Walkman whilst walking through the town on a Saturday afternoon. It makes everyone move in slow motion!

You might not like all of this album, but you're going to LOVE some of it. Which tracks you love and hate will depend on what you're into and who you are. If you love ALL of it, Congratulations! - you're genuinely devoid of prejudice. Vows are often made in a state of innocence and broken in the light of experience. Of this, I'm positive.

Steve H. Dec '97"

== Track listing ==
1. "Estonia" - 11:43
2. "Memory Of Water" - 9:36
3. "This Strange Engine" - 20:37
4. "One Fine Day" - 8:20
5. "Face 1004" - 8:40
6. "80 Days" - 8:46
