= The Uninvited Guest (song) =

1989 single by Marillion

Single by Marillion

from the album Seasons End
- Released: 27 November 1989 (UK)
- Genre: Neo-prog
- Length: 3:52 (album version); 3:44 (7-inch version); 5:04 (12-inch version)
- Label: EMI
- Songwriters: Steve Hogarth, Mark Kelly; Ian Mosley; Steve Rothery; Pete Trewavas; John Helmer
- Producers: Nick Davis; Marillion

Marillion singles chronology
"Hooks In You" (1989)	"The Uninvited Guest" (1989)	"Easter" (1989)

Audio sample
- file; help

"The Uninvited Guest" is the second single from English band Marillion's fifth studio album Seasons End, released in 1989. It was the band's first single since their debut "Market Square Heroes" in 1982 that did not enter the UK Singles Chart's top 40, peaking at no. 53.

== Overview ==
Like most of the songs on Seasons End, the lyrics for "The Uninvited Guest" were written by John Helmer, who was appointed by EMI to write lyrics for the band following the departure of former lyricist Fish. In a 1994 interview with the Marillion fan club newsletter The Web, Helmer revealed the song was inspired by the AIDS epidemic, saying:

It is mainly about the unwanted disturbance of your life ... I think for me, it's about the seventies - when I was in my teens, there was much sexual freedom, everything was very free and easy and you could get experience with everything you wanted. In the eighties, everybody was more controlled and careful, and AIDS was basically the last straw: people were wary about with whom to share their table and bed. People tried to hide from all of this by locking themselves in, which gave me spooky images of The Uninvited Guest, and as a matter of fact it could also be you, at a party, being the person nobody wanted to know.

== Critical reception ==
Upon single release Melody Maker reviewer Mick Mercer considered that the band's sound became very similar to Peter Gabriel style.

== Track listing ==
=== 7-inch and cassette version ===
Side 1

1. "The Uninvited Guest" (7-inch version) – 3:44

Side 2

1. "The Bell in the Sea" - 4:21

=== 12-inch and CD version ===
Side 1

1. "The Uninvited Guest" (12-inch version) - 5:02

Side 2

1. "The Bell in the Sea" - 4:21
2. "The Uninvited Guest" (7-inch version) - 3:44
- The CD pressing merely reverses the track order on side two.

=== Single version ===
1. "The Uninvited Guest" - 3:50

== Music video ==
The video shows Hogarth as a man awakened during the night by The Uninvited Guest, also portrayed by Hogarth (often using split screen). The man is pursued around his living room by the guest, who appears and disappears at will while delivering the song's lyrics. The other band members observe proceedings from a table suspended in mid-air.

== Chart positions ==
Chart (1998)	Position
UK Singles Chart	53
Dutch GfK chart	85

== Personnel ==
- Steve Hogarth - vocals
- Steve Rothery - guitars
- Mark Kelly - keyboards
- Pete Trewavas - bass
- Ian Mosley - drums
