= Cover My Eyes (Pain and Heaven) =

1991 single by Marillion

Single by Marillion

from the album Holidays in Eden
- Released: 27 May 1991
- Length: 3:52
- Label: EMI
- Songwriters: Steve Hogarth, Mark Kelly, Ian Mosley, Steve Rothery, Pete Trewavas
- Producer: Christopher Neil

Marillion singles chronology
"Easter" (1990)	"Cover My Eyes (Pain and Heaven)" (1991)	"No One Can" (1991)

Audio sample
- file; help

"Cover My Eyes (Pain and Heaven)" is the lead single from the 1991 album Holidays in Eden by British neo-prog band Marillion. A straightforward pop song, it peaked at number 34 on the UK Singles Chart, but reached number 14 in the Netherlands, becoming the band's biggest hit there since "Kayleigh" (1985). The band performed on Top of the Pops on 6 June 1991, despite the song at the time being outside the top 40.

The B-side was the non-album track "How Can It Hurt". The 12-inch vinyl and 5-inch CD single included exactly the same tracks as the 7-inch and cassette single plus another track from Holidays in Eden, "The Party".

A Mexican promo was released with the Spanish title "Cubro Mis Ojos".

== Track listings ==
- 7-inch and cassette version

A. "Cover My Eyes (Pain and Heaven)" – 3:52
B. "How Can It Hurt" – 4:10

- 12-inch version

A1. "Cover My Eyes (Pain and Heaven)" – 3:48
B1. "How Can It Hurt" – 4:10
B2. "The Party" – 5:36

- 5-inch CD single
1. "Cover My Eyes (Pain and Heaven)" – 3:48
2. "How Can It Hurt" – 4:10
3. "The Party" – 5:36

== Personnel ==
- Steve Hogarth – vocals
- Steve Rothery – guitars
- Mark Kelly – keyboards
- Pete Trewavas – bass
- Ian Mosley – drums

== Charts ==
Chart (1991)	Peak position
Germany (Official German Charts)	73
Netherlands (Dutch Singles Chart)	14
UK Singles (OCC)	34
UK Airplay (Music Week)	32
