= This Strange Engine =

Studio album by Marillion
- Released: 9 April 1997 (Japan); 21 April 1997 (UK)
- Recorded: August–November 1996
- Studio: The Racket Club, Buckinghamshire, England
- Length: 56:06
- Label: Raw Power
- Producer: Marillion

Marillion chronology
The Best of Both Worlds (1997)	This Strange Engine (1997)	Radiation (1998)

Singles from This Strange Engine
- 1. "Man of a Thousand Faces" Released: 2 June 1997 (UK); 2. "Eighty Days" Released: 13 October 1997 (UK)

Professional ratings
Review scores
Source	Rating
AllMusic	2.5/5 stars

This Strange Engine is the ninth studio album by the British neo-prog band Marillion, released in April 1997 by the Castle Communications imprint Raw Power. It was the first of the three recordings that Marillion made under contract with Castle, after being dropped by EMI Records in 1995 and before eventually going independent in 2000. The album was recorded at The Racket Club in Buckinghamshire, England, between August and November 1996 and was produced by the band themselves.

== Background ==
Without promotional efforts of a major record label, This Strange Engine continued the decline in mainstream success for Marillion, reaching only number 27 in the UK Albums Chart and staying there for three weeks. It sold significantly better in the Netherlands, home of one of the band's most loyal audiences, peaking at number 10 on the charts. Two singles from the album were released: "Man of a Thousand Faces" and "Eighty Days". For the first time in the band's history, no song cracked the UK Top 40; the first single reached number 98 and the second one failed to chart at all.

The fourth track, "Estonia", was written after singer Steve Hogarth met Paul Barney, the only British survivor of the sinking of the cruise ferry Estonia in the Baltic Sea on 28 September 1994, which killed 852 people. This is the only song of Marillion to feature a balalaika.

The title track is a tribute by Steve Hogarth to his father, a marine engineer and an officer. The senior Hogarth sacrificed his life at sea for a job in a coal mine so that he could be close to his family.

On European editions, following the last track, at approximately 29:35, there is a hidden track of Hogarth giggling uncontrollably, recorded on his return to the studio after a night on the town.

A remix of the album, Tales from the Engine Room, conducted by the electronic music project Positive Light, was first released as a limited edition January 1998 on Racket Records, and in June 1998 it was released worldwide by Eagle Records.

== Track listing ==
All lyrics are written by Steve Hogarth and John Helmer, except where noted; all music is composed by Marillion.

No.	Title	Lyrics	Length
1.	"Man of a Thousand Faces"		7:33
2.	"One Fine Day"		5:31
3.	"80 Days"	Hogarth	5:00
4.	"Estonia"	Hogarth	7:56
5.	"Memory of Water"		3:01
6.	"An Accidental Man"		6:12
7.	"Hope for the Future"		5:10
8.	"This Strange Engine"	Hogarth	15:34
Total length:			56:06

Japan Pony Canyon edition bonus tracks
No.	Title	Lyrics	Length
9.	"Beautiful" (unplugged version)	Hogarth	4:49
10.	"Made Again" (unplugged version)	Helmer	5:12
Total length:			66:07

USA Velvel second pressing bonus tracks
No.	Title	Lyrics	Length
9.	"Estonia" (The Positive Light Mix)	Hogarth	11:49
10.	"80 Days" (Acoustic Version)	Hogarth	5:39
Total length:			70:49

== Personnel ==
=== Marillion ===
- Steve Hogarth – vocals, backing vocals, additional keyboards and percussion
- Steve Rothery – guitar
- Pete Trewavas – bass, backing vocals
- Mark Kelly – keyboards, backing vocals
- Ian Mosley – drums, percussion

=== Additional musicians ===
- Charlton & Newbottle School Choir – choir (on "Man of a Thousand Faces")
- Tim Perkins – balalaika (on "Estonia")
- Phil Todd – saxophone (on "This Strange Engine")
- Paul Savage – trumpet (on "Hope for the Future")

=== Technical personnel ===
- Stewart Every – engineer
- Dave Meegan – mixing engineer
- Andrew Gent – artwork
- Hugh Gilmour – art direction, design

== Charts ==
1997 chart performance for This Strange Engine
Chart (1997)	Peak position
Dutch Albums (Album Top 100)	10
Finnish Albums (Suomen virallinen lista)	38
German Albums (Offizielle Top 100)	48
Scottish Albums (OCC)	35
UK Albums (OCC)	27
UK Rock & Metal Albums (OCC)	1

2024 chart performance for This Strange Engine
Chart (2024)	Peak position
German Albums (Offizielle Top 100)	14
Swiss Albums (Schweizer Hitparade)	54
