= I and Thou (band) =

British progressive rock group

I and Thou is a progressive rock group that is primarily a solo effort from Jason Hart (keyboardist for Renaissance and Camel) with supporting musicians John Galgano (bassist for IZZ), Matt Johnson (drummer for Jeff Buckley, and Rufus Wainwright), and Jack Petruzzelli (guitarist for Patti Smith and The Fab Faux).

Hart stated in an interview that the name was chosen to pay homage to the Martin Buber book, I and Thou.

== Discography ==
As of June 2014, I and Thou have released one album, and are currently working on a follow-up.

=== Speak ===
Speak

Studio album by I and Thou
- Released: 2012
- Recorded: 2009–2012
- Genre: Progressive rock
- Length: 60:38
- Label: Independent
- Producer: Jason Hart

I and Thou's first album, Speak, was released in 2012. It features a cover image by Renaissance lead vocalist Annie Haslam. Hart has stated that he began developing material for the album in 2005, and the recording began in 2009. Rob Hughes, writing for PROG magazine, observed

"The ravishing minimalism of Speak relies heavily on mood and atmosphere for much of its effect, with Hart combining elements of symphonic rock, progressive rock, classical music, and ambient music. It's a record of discreet pleasures, slowly unlocking its secrets with every play."

The album has received generally positive reviews, receiving a 4/5 rating from Henri Strik at Background Magazine, 12/15 from Jochen König at Musikreview.de, and 9/10 from Grande Rock.

==== Track listing ====
All songs written by Jason Hart except as indicated.

1. "Speak" – 12:23
2. "...and I Awaken" - 11:35
3. "Hide and Seek" - 16:34
4. "The Face Behind the Eyes" - 13:38
5. "Go or Go Ahead" (Rufus Wainwright) - 6:43

== Personnel ==
- Jason Hart - piano, keyboard, lead and background vocals, percussion, glockenspiel, trumpet, additional guitar and sound effects
- John Galgano - bass guitar and background vocals
- Matt Johnson - drums
- Jack Petruzzelli - electric, acoustic, and classical guitar, mandolin, banjo

=== Additional personnel ===
- Paul Bremner - additional guitar
- Maxim Moston - violin
- Laura Meade - background vocals
- Keren Ann - vocals on "Hide and Seek"
- Steve Hogarth - vocals on "Go or Go Ahead"

=== Production ===
- Jason Hart - producer
- Jack Petruzzelli, Philip Hart and Mac Simpson - executive producers
- Mixed by Fernando Lodeiro
- Mastered by Fred Kevorkian
- Cover image, "This Glorious Earth", by Annie Haslam
