= Ice Cream Genius =

Studio album by Steve Hogarth
- Released: 27 February 1997
- Recorded: 1996
- Studios: Brisbane House; The Racket Club; Solmill; The Wool Hall
- Genre: Art rock
- Length: 47:48 (original edition)
- Labels: Intact Records, When! Recordings
- Producer: Craig Leon

Ice Cream Genius is the title of the first solo album by Steve Hogarth, singer of Marillion. It was originally released in 1997 on When! Recordings. It was released in North America in August 1998 with a different artwork and with the extra track "The Last Thing".

== Background ==
Recording commenced at the Racket Club, and the vocals were added at Chris Rea's Sol Mill studios in Cockham. Mixing took place at the Woolhall Studios in Somerset, owned by Van Morrison. There was a break for Marillions Made Again tour in April 1996, and Ice Cream Genius was finally completed on 20 July 1996. Hogarth said in an interview 1997 :

"When the producer, Craig Leon, really went crazy about something, he used to shout 'I scream genius on that!'. And while thinking about an album title I kind of liked this phonetical word joke."

Hogarth said in the Web UK Magazine 1996:

"The point of making this record was to fulfil the long term ambition to make an album about me. In that sense its utterly selfish. It was a pleasure and a treat to work with the other musicians, hand-picked from some of the best bands in the world, and to discover, first hand, their phenomenal talent and empathy.."

It was the producer Leon who decided to not put the track "The Last Thing" on the first edition of the album.

Hogarth said in The Web UK Magazine 1996 about each track:

- The Evening Shadows: It's about a little creature that wakes up at night and wreaks havoc. It's a bit like Lucy in the Sky of Diamonds, meeting Syd Barret in a dark alley.
- Really Like: It's a white afro-funk number. A combination of rhythm box and real percussion by Brazilian Luis Jardim.
- You Dinosaur Thing: This is a sixtiesish homage to old rockers. We are old rockers in someone's eyes. About the fashion aspect in music and being "past it" before you've even got started. Everyone who's heard it thinks it's about Oasis...but it's all about us.
- The Deep Water: This is a poem set to music. It's a poem about my own death and my own love. The music is like a movie, very visual and ambient. But at the end the water runs dry to Desert and the song turns from ambient to rhythmic. It goes Arabic and a little like the Doors.
- Cage: A song about staring at a cage...and being inside one. It's about waiting for a letter...or waiting for the phone to ring.
- Until You Fall: A sort of Velvet Underground and a Lou Reed verse with an XTC chorus. At this stage this chorus is one of my favourites.
- Better Dreams: Los Angeles for the first time. How it struck me. I remember getting into a lift and when the doors closed I realised it was just me and Debbie Harry. Then it stopped and she got out and Little Richard got in...It's a freedom story, just voice and strings with a sprinkle of ambient guitar and flute.
- Nothing To Declare: We used to live near Heathrow Airport and I used to watch the 747's climbing up over my house and wonder where they were going. I often thought it must be somewhere warmer and more exciting than rainy old England. I wrote the lyrics back then.

== Track listing ==
All lyrics are written by Steve Hogarth; all music is composed by Steve Hogarth, except where noted.

No.	Title	Music	Length
1.	"The Evening Shadows"		4:28
2.	"Really Like"		5:19
3.	"You Dinosaur Thing"		5:00
4.	"The Deep Water"		8:05
5.	"Cage"	Hogarth and Michael Hunter	7:02
6.	"Until You Fall"		3:57
7.	"Better Dreams"		7:23
8.	"Nothing To Declare"		6:34
Total length:			47:48

Bonus track on re-issues
No.	Title	Lyrics	Music	Length
9.	"The Last Thing"	Hogarth	Hogarth, Dave Gregory, Richard Barbieri	8:15
Total length:				56:03

== Personnel ==
- Steve Hogarth - vocals, piano, samples and machines
- Dave Gregory – guitars
- Chucho Merchan – bass
- Richard Barbieri – synthesizers
- Clem Burke - drums
- Luis Jardim - percussion

Additional personnel

- Steve Jansen – percussion
- Stuart Gordon – strings
- Craig Leon – 12 string cloud on "Until You Fall"
- Eddie Thornton - trumpet
- Brian Edwards - saxophone
- Trevor Edwards - trombone
- Tim Weather - flute
- Cassel Webb, Stuart Epps - backing vocals

Production

- Produced and mixed by Craig Leon
- Co-produced by Steve Hogarth
- Engineered by Stewart Every
- Additional engineering by Michael Hunter, Stuart Epps

== Charts ==
Chart performance for Ice Cream Genius
Chart (2026)	Peak position
French Rock & Metal Albums (SNEP) Deluxe edition	86
