= Luís Jardim =

Portuguese percussionist (1950–2025)

Background information
- Born: Luís Alberto Figueira Gonçalves Jardim; 4 July 1950; Funchal, Madeira, Portugal
- Died: 4 July 2025 (aged 75) Cadaval, Lisbon District, Portugal
- Occupation: Percussionist
- Instruments: Drums; percussion; bass guitar; guitar
- Years active: 1976–2025

Luís Alberto Figueira Gonçalves Jardim (4 July 1950 – 4 July 2025) was a Portuguese percussionist and multi-instrumentalist. He was best known for his work with producer Trevor Horn.

== Early life ==
Jardim was born in Funchal, the capital city of the Autonomous Region of Madeira, in 1950. His cousin was Alberto João Jardim, the long-serving was the President of the Regional Government of Madeira.

During the 1960s, he was a member of a rock band called Demónios Negros ('Black Demons'). He moved to England the following decade in order to study business administration.

== Musical work ==
Jardim worked prolifically as a session musician in London during the 1980s and 90s – mostly playing percussion, bass, drums and occasionally keyboards.

His career included music composition, production, arrangements, and studio work. He took part in the UK selection process for the Eurovision Song Contest 1981, fronting the group 'Headache' in the A Song for Europe contest broadcast on BBC1. The song, "Not Without Your Ticket (Don't Go)", placed seventh of the eight entries.

Beginning with ABC's debut studio album The Lexicon of Love in 1981/1982, Jardim worked extensively on projects with Trevor Horn, including with Seal and on Grace Jones' Slave to the Rhythm (1985), including playing bass guitar on the title track. He produced Everything Could Be So Perfect, the debut studio album by Anne Pigalle for Horn's ZTT label. He went on "tournées" with Tina Turner, George Michael, and Rod Stewart. Jardim played drums, percussion, bass guitar, and guitars. He played live at the 2004 Produced by Trevor Horn show and with the Producers in 2006/2007.

He worked with Prefab Sprout, Madness (on Keep Moving and Mad Not Mad), Asia (on Astra and Arena and Aura), Claire Martin (Take My Heart), Yes, Sir Paul McCartney, The Rolling Stones, They Might Be Giants, Mike Batt, David Bowie, Cher, Grace Jones, Björk, Mezzoforte, Bee Gees, Duran Duran, Robbie Williams, Elvis Costello, Gareth Gates, Tom Jones, Alejandro Sanz, Nina Hagen, João Pedro Pais, Eros Ramazzotti, Diana Ross, Rod Stewart, Johnny Hallyday, Mariah Carey, Celine Dion, Sir Elton John, George Michael, Cyndi Lauper, Gloria Estefan, Katie Melua, Modern Romance, Jeff Beck, Fish, Tina Turner, Roddy Frame, Billy Idol, Coldplay, David Gilmour, Tears for Fears, the The, Steve Hogarth and Marillion.

== Work on Portuguese television ==
Jardim appeared on the Portuguese version of Pop Idol. He was then a judge on Uma Canção Para Ti (A Song for You), a talent show for young people (between 8 and 15 years old) for two seasons. He was a judge on A Tua Cara Não Me é Estranha, a show where eight Portuguese celebrities in the field of acting and music mime a randomly selected musician every week.

== Personal life ==
He was married to vocalist Linda Allen, from 1971-1978 known for her work with Buggles on their biggest hit "Video Killed the Radio Star",

=== Death ===
Jardim died on 4 July 2025, on his 75th birthday, in Cadaval.

== Collaborations ==
With Asia

- Arena (Bullet Proof, 1996)
- Aura (Recognition, 2001)

With Blue Zone

- Big Thing (Arista, 1988)

With Ray Charles

- Strong Love Affair (Warner Bros. Records, 1996)

With Beverley Craven

- Love Scenes (Epic, 1993)
- Mixed Emotions (Epic, 1999)

With Bryan Ferry

- Taxi (Virgin, 1993)
- Mamouna (Virgin, 1994)

With Frankie Goes to Hollywood

- Welcome to the Pleasuredome (ZTT, 1984)
- Liverpool (ZTT, 1986)

With Clive Griffin

- Step by Step (Mercury, 1989)
- Clive Griffin (Epic, 1993)

With Nina Hagen

- Nina Hagen (Mercury, 1989)
- Street (Mercury, 1991)

With Holly Johnson

- Blast (MCA, 1989)
- Soulstream (Pleasuredome, 1999)

With Annie Lennox

- Diva (Arista, 1992)
- Medusa (Arista, 1995)

With Seal

- Seal (ZTT, 1991)
- Seal (ZTT, 1994)
- Seal IV (Warner Bros., 2003)
- 7 (Warner Bros., 2015)

With Wet Wet Wet

- Holding Back the River (Mercury, 1989)
- 10 (Mercury, 1997)

With Robbie Williams

- Escapology (Chrysalis, 2002)
- Reality Killed the Video Star (Virgin, 2009)

With others

- Oleta Adams, Circle of One (Fontana, 1990)
- Joan Armatrading, Square the Circle (A&M, 1992)
- The Adventures, Trading Secrets with the Moon (Elektra, 1989)
- Aztec Camera, Frestonia (Reprise, 1995)
- Spandau Ballet, Heart Like a Sky (CBS, 1989)
- Bee Gees, Size Isn't Everything (Polydor, 1993)
- Black, Black (A&M, 1991)
- Boyzone, Where We Belong (Polydor, 1998)
- James Brown, Universal James (Scotti Bros., 1993)
- The Buggles, Adventures in Modern Recording (CBS, 1981)
- Paul Carrack, Blue Views (I.R.S., 1995)
- Eric Clapton, Pilgrim (Reprise, 1998)
- Climie Fisher, Everything (EMI, 1988)
- Simon Climie, Soul Inspiration (Epic, 1992)
- Coldplay, Mylo Xyloto (Capitol, 2011)
- Elvis Costello, Goodbye Cruel World (F-Beat, 1984)
- Marie-Claire D'Ubaldo, Marie Claire D'Ubaldo (Polydor, 1994)
- Celine Dion, One Heart (Columbia, 2003)
- Duran Duran, Liberty (Parlophone, 1990)
- Matt Dusk, Two Shots (Decca, 2004)
- Julia Fordham, Julia Fordham (Virgin, 1988)
- Gabrielle, Gabrielle (Polygram, 1996)
- Noel Gallagher's High Flying Birds, Noel Gallagher's High Flying Birds (Sour Mash, 2011)
- David Gilmour, About Face (Harvest, 1984)
- Sophie B. Hawkins, Whaler (Columbia, 1994)
- Murray Head, Sooner or Later (Virgin, 1987)
- Steve Hogarth, Ice Cream Genius (When! Recordings, 1997)
- Yusuf Islam, An Other Cup (Atlantic, 2006)
- Garland Jeffreys, Wildlife Dictionary (MCA, 1997)
- Duncan James, Future Past (Innocent, 2006)
- Grace Jones, Slave to the Rhythm (Island, 1985)
- Howard Jones, People (Ark 21, 1998)
- Juanes, P.A.R.C.E. (Universal Music, 2010)
- John Legend, Evolver (Columbia, 2008)
- Lighthouse Family, Postcards from Heaven (Polydor, 1997)
- Mitch Malloy, Ceiling & Walls (BMG, 1994)
- Barry Manilow, Barry Manilow (Arista, 1989)
- Melanie C, Reason (Virgin, 2003)
- Mark Owen, Green Man (RCA, 1996)
- The Neville Brothers, Uptown (EMI, 1987)
- Nerina Pallot, Dear Frustrated Superstar (Polydor, 2001)
- Pet Shop Boys, Fundamental (Parlophone, 2006)
- Maggie Reilly, Elena (EMI, 1996)
- The Rolling Stones, Steel Wheels (Columbia Records, 1989)
- The Rolling Stones, Voodoo Lounge (Virgin Records, 1994)
- Jennifer Rush, Credo (EMI, 1997)
- Alejandro Sanz, Si Tú Me Miras (WEA, 1993)
- Michael W. Smith, Live the Life (Reunion, 1998)
- Dusty Springfield, Reputation (Parlophone, 1990)
- Lisa Stansfield, The Moment (Edel, 2004)
- Tears for Fears, The Seeds of Love (Fontana, 1989)
- Tanita Tikaram, The Cappuccino Songs (Mother, 1998)
- The The, Infected (Some Bizarre, 1986)
- Richard and Linda Thompson, Sunnyvista (Chrysalis Records, 1979)
- Vaya Con Dios, Roots and Wings (Ariola, 1995)
- Wham!, Fantastic (Columbia, 1983)
- Will Young, Keep On (19 Recordings, 2005)
