= RanestRane =

Italian progressive rock band

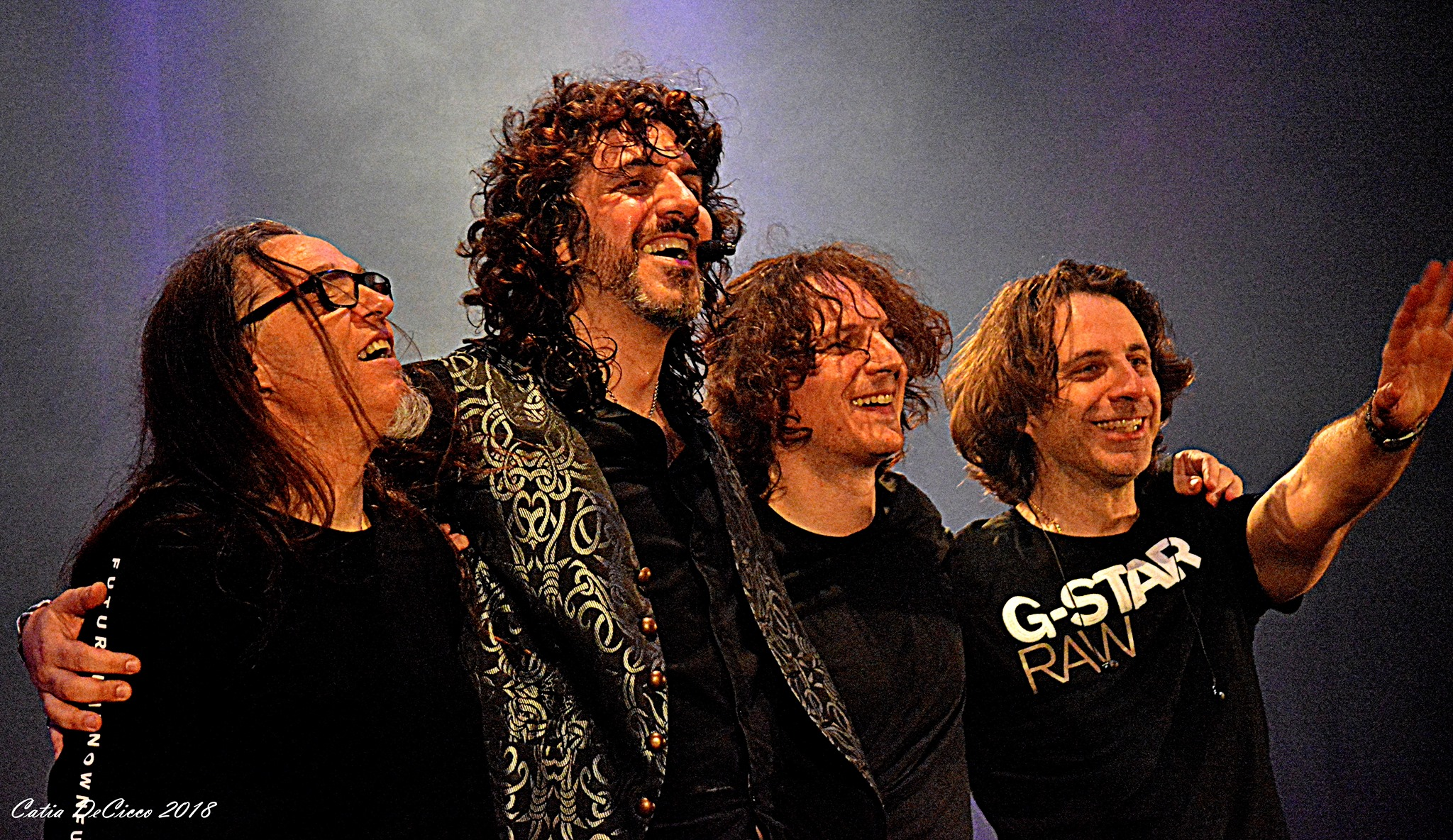
- RanestRane, 2019. L-R: Maurizio Meo, Daniele Pomo, Riccardo Romano and Massimo Pomo

Background information
- Origin: Rome, Italy
- Genres: Progressive rock, neo-prog
- Years active: 1998–present
- Label: Camelot Maracash
- Members: Daniele Pomo; Riccardo Romano; Massimo Pomo; Maurizio Meo
- Website: ranestrane.net
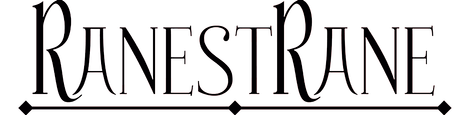

RanestRane (Italian for "strange frogs") is an Italian neo-prog band from Rome that stages melodic and partly instrumental symphonic prog with fine melody lines as a rock opera.

== Collaborations ==
RanestRane have collaborated with several international musicians within the progressive rock genre. Members of the British progressive rock band Marillion have commented publicly on the Italian group.

In an interview with Prog Italia, Marillion guitarist Steve Rothery referred to RanestRane as the “best contemporary Italian progressive band.”

In a separate interview published in Mat 2020, Marillion vocalist Steve Hogarth described working with RanestRane as “a great pleasure and privilege,” and highlighted the band’s compositional and musical abilities.

== History ==
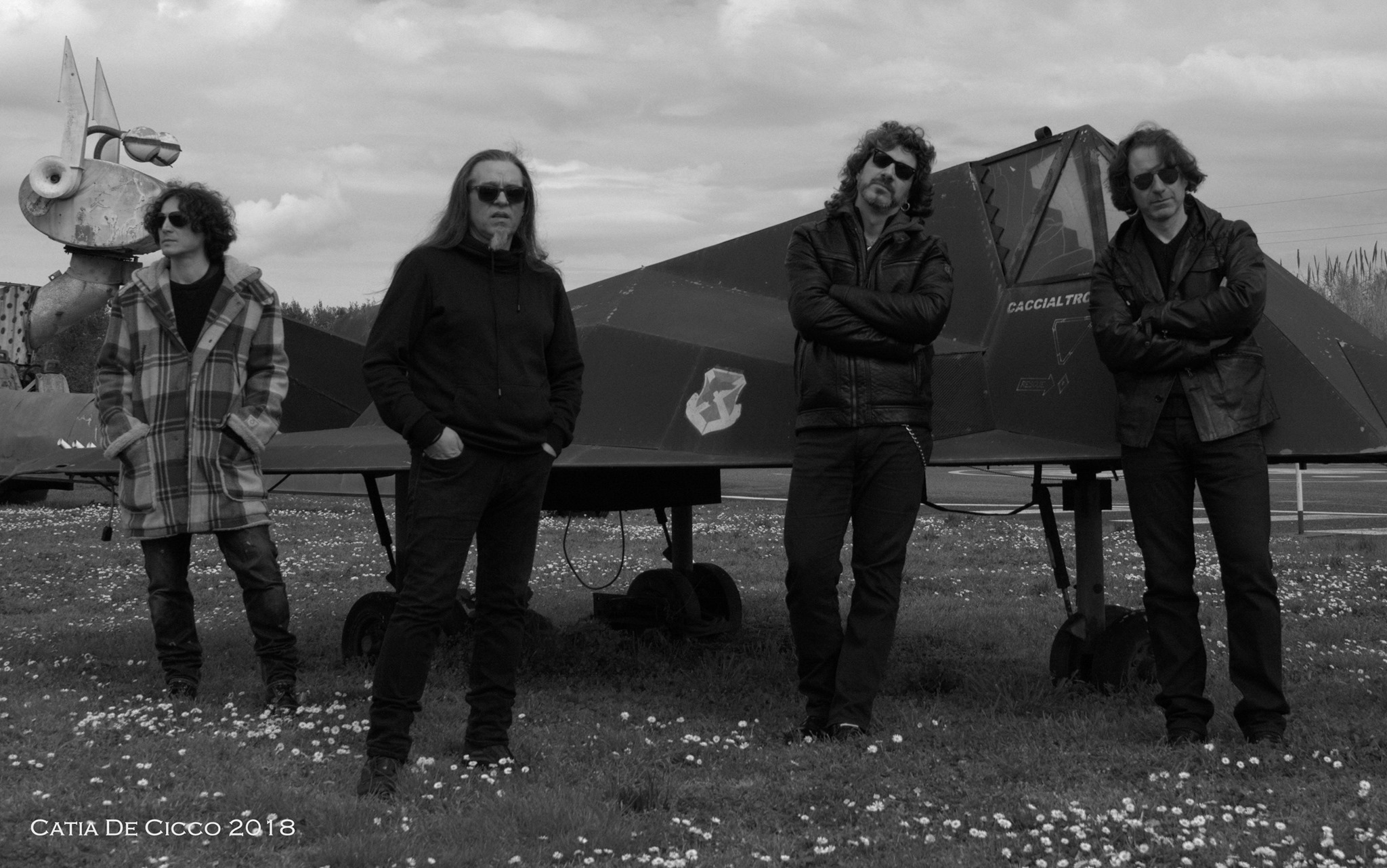
RanestRane

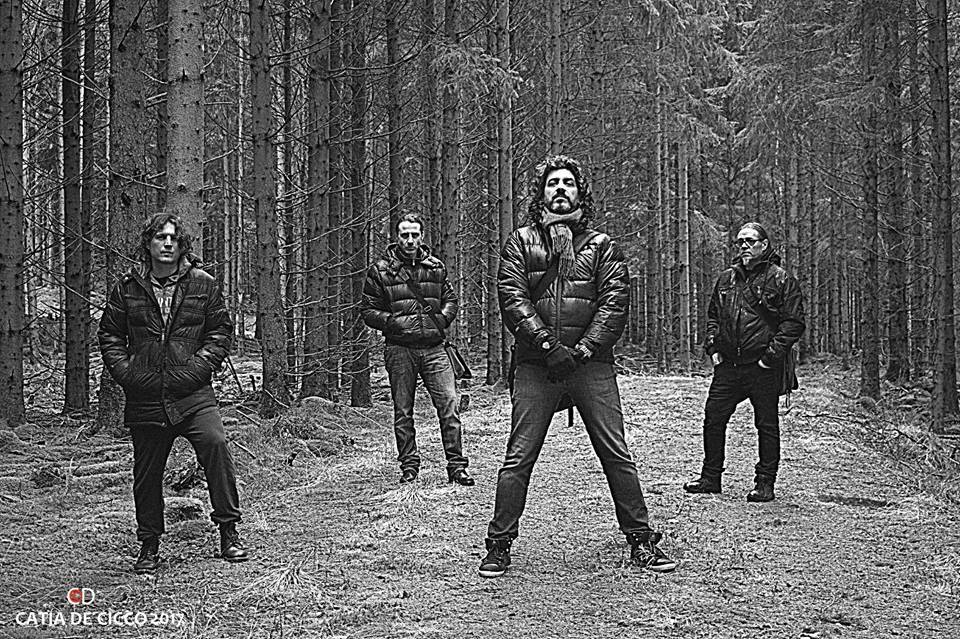
RanestRane

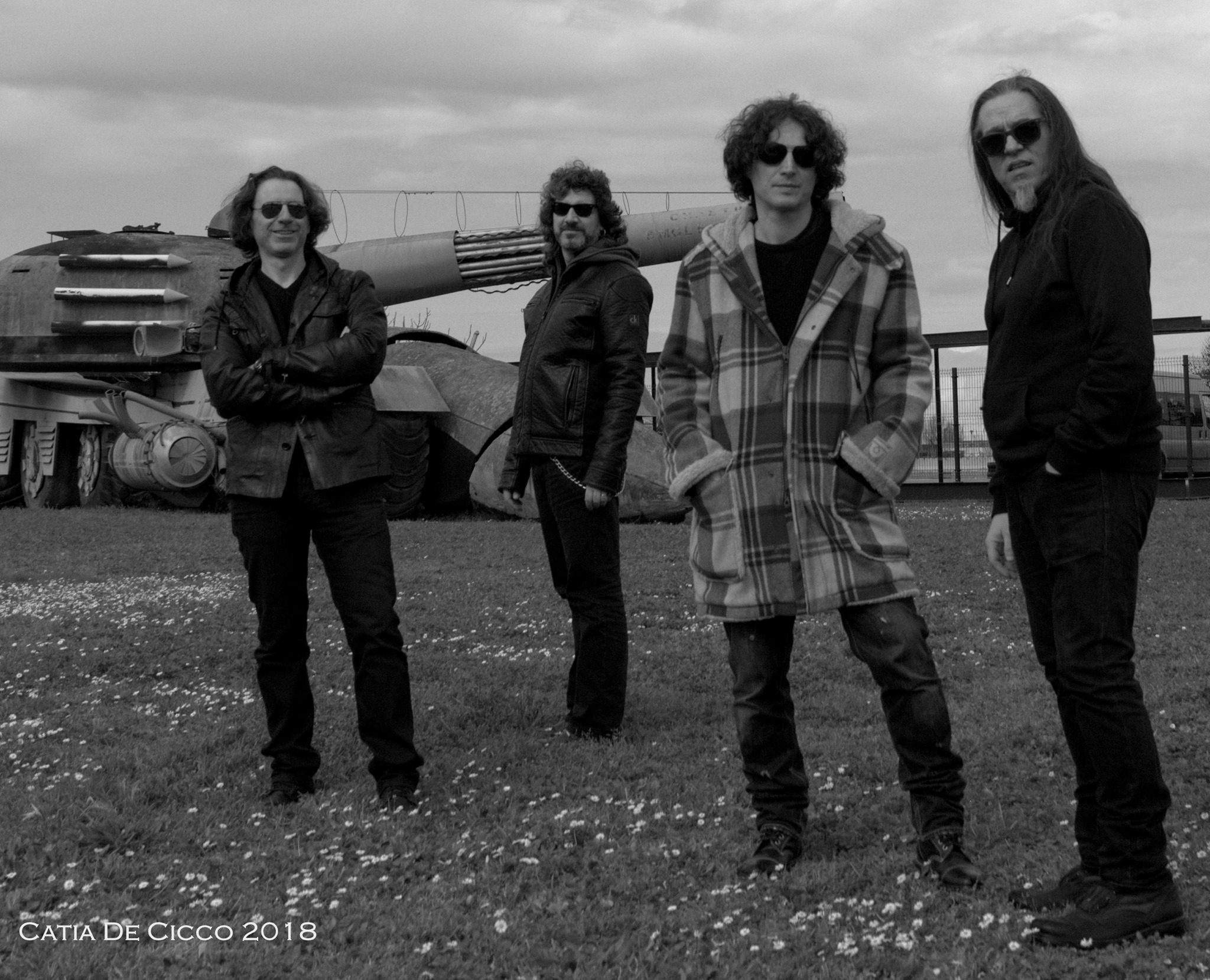
RanestRane

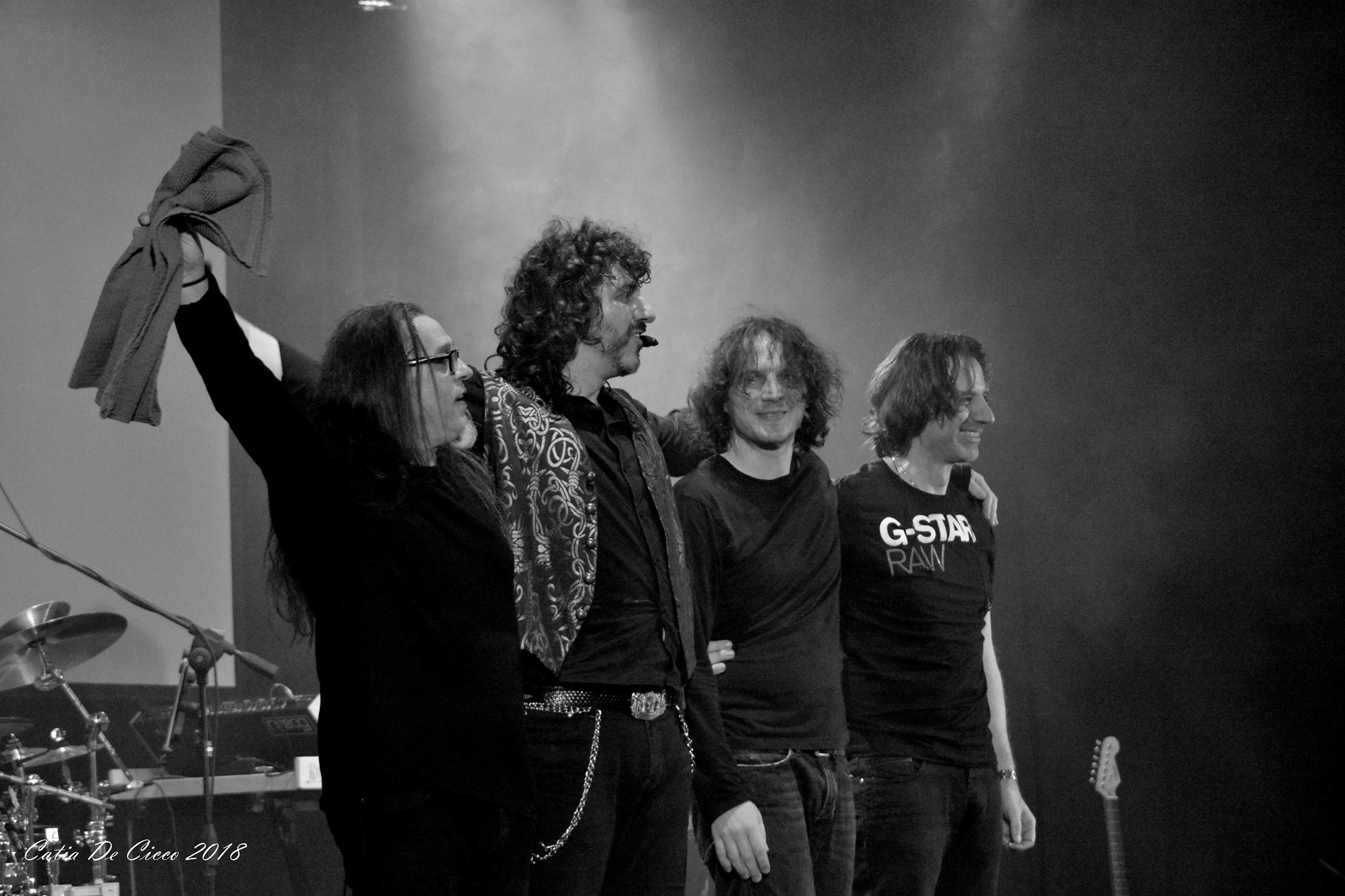
RanestRane

=== Founding in 1998 and conceptual idea ===
The band was founded in 1998 in Rome by the current members and first made a name for itself in the Italian Progressive rock scene through live performances.

In the following years they developed and refined their conceptual idea to conceive rock operas in the classical Italian tradition of Progressive Rock. The band combines their own composed music with short excerpts from a film projected in the background.

Among the musical influences are bands like Goblin, Genesis and Marillion.

The first complete project was released by the band in 2002, when the four Italians accompanied Werner Herzog's film "Nosferatu" in concerts and provided it with new sounds. This procedure, called "Cineconcerto" by the band, is reminiscent of the film adaptations of Art Zoyd, who also chose "Nosferatu" as an object for their adaptation. In contrast to the French, RanestRane did not choose the original by Friedrich Wilhelm Murnau as a model, but the remake by Werner Herzog..

=== First studio album ===
The resulting album Nosferatu Il Vampiro (2007) thus offers a new soundtrack to Werner Herzog's film in the form of a kind of rock opera, with Daniele Pomo as the only singer. Excerpts from the film, i.e. original fragments of the Italian soundtrack, short dialogues and monologues, serve as hooks for the individual numbers, which are then presented by the four protagonists on various keyboard instruments, guitar, bass and drums, sometimes interrupted again by insertions with film dialogues. Musically one moves completely in the tradition of the classical, rather song oriented Italo-Progs of the 70s. There are links to Italian Neo-progressive rock.

In 2011 the band released their second album Shining, an adaptation of Stanley Kubrick's "The Shining (film)" with psychedelic atmospheres and changing vocal and instrumental parts, typical for Ranestane's work.

=== The Space Odyssey Trilogy ===
In November 2013 the first part of a trilogy inspired by Stanley Kubrick's masterpiece 2001: A Space Odyssey (film) was released with A Space Odyssey - Part 1 - Monolith. The album included guest appearances by Steve Rothery and Steve Hogarth, guitarist and singer respectively of Marillion. The opportunity to collaborate arose in 2012 during the annual The Web Italy Convention, when RanestRane previewed the album and played some songs from the Marillion repertoire with Steve Rothery. In the same year RanestRane played at the Italian Prog Rock Festival in Japan together with the guitarist Enzo Vita, accompanied by a symphony orchestra. It was the first live performance of the groundbreaking symphonic rock album Contaminazione (originally released in 1973 by Il Rovescio della Medaglia - RDM) in its entirety. The recording of the concert has been released in 2014 as Live in Tokyo.

In the year 2014 RanestRane played as opening act of the Steve Rothery band on their European Tour. On 5 February 2015 Monolith in Rome - A Space Odyssey Live has been released as an album on DVD and CD. This live recording was filmed and recorded at the Crossroads Live Club in Rome with Steve Rothery. In March 2015 RanestRane performed on the prestigious stage of the Marillion-Weekend in Port Zelande, Ouddorp (Netherlands) in front of 3,000 spectators. In September 2015 the band played acoustic arrangements of Marillion's classics and Hogarth's song repertoire with Steve Hogarth in Rome. The event was part of Steve Hogarth's 'H natural 2015 Christmas' tour. On 12 December 2016 the live recording of the concert had been released on DVD as Friends, Romans: H Natural featured by RanestRane. The live CD was released in February 2017.

Almost two years after the first part, the band released the album A Space Odyssey - Part 2 - H.A.L. on 16 November 2015, the second part of their interpretation of the music to Stanley Kubrick's classic "2001: A Space Odyssey (film)". RanestRane had been touring Europe from 27 November 2015 on to support the Album during their H.A.L. EUROPA TOUR 2015/2016, playing in Italy, the Netherlands, Germany, Denmark, Sweden and England.

In spring 2017 the band toured in Germany, Sweden, the Netherlands, Belgium, Germany, Denmark and Italy with the concept of "The Cinematic Show". During this tour RanestRane played a "Best of" of their previous albums as well as a preview of the new, third album of the Odyssey trilogy A Space Odyssey - Trilogy. In October 2017 RanestRane played as support act during Marillion's Japanese Tour.

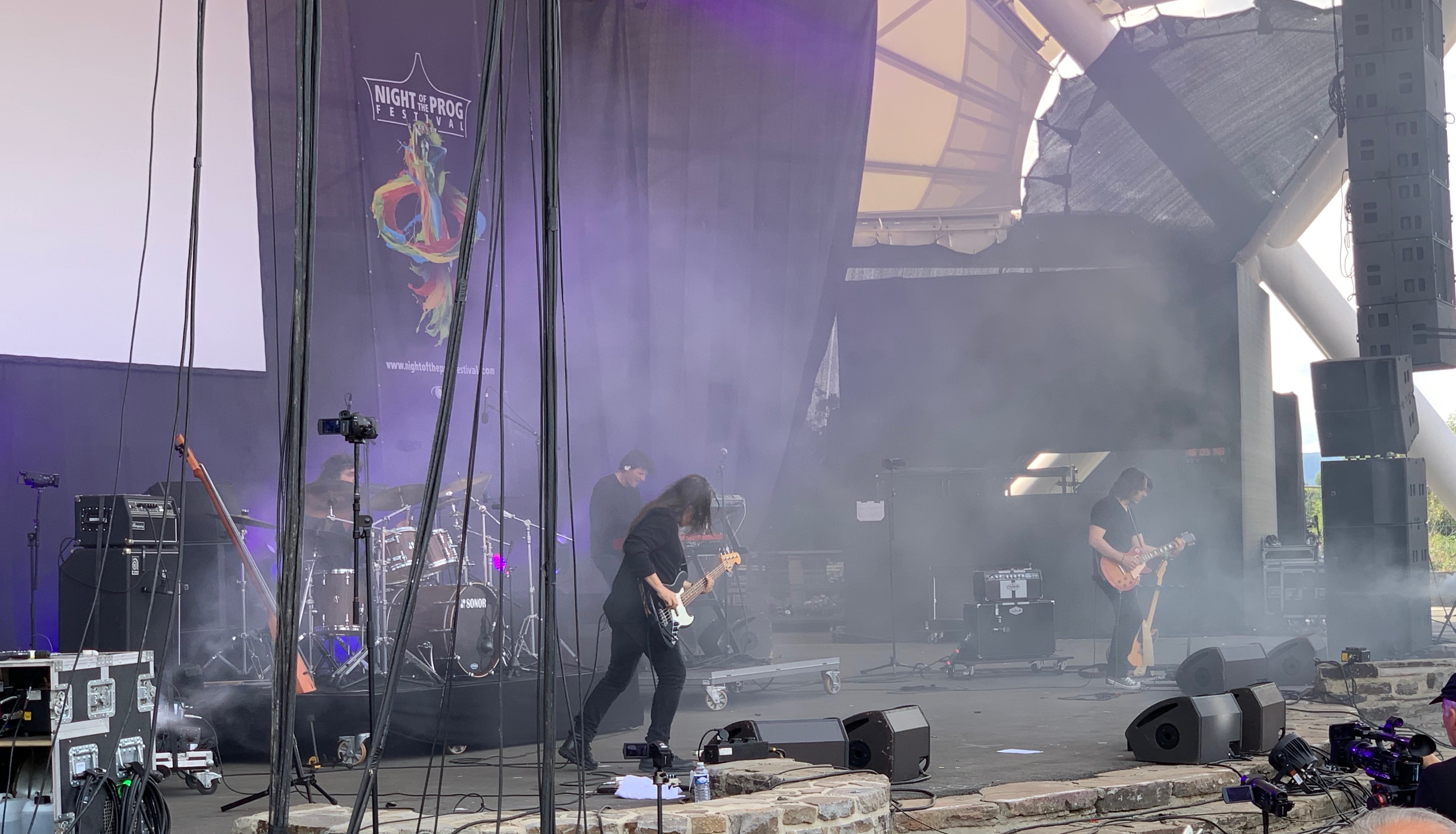
RanestRane at Night of the Prog - Festival 21. Juni 2019 open-air-stage Loreley

With the release of the third part A Space Odyssey - Final Part - Starchild in the year 2018 the band closed this elaborate project. This album again included guest appearances by Steve Rothery and Steve Hogarth of Marillion. It was followed up by a fan weekend and concerts in Italy, the Netherlands, Germany, England, Denmark and Sweden at their "Starchild Tour" (The 20th Anniversary Across Europe).

In September 2018 RanestRane performed as one of the Headliners at the Veruno Two Days +1 Prog Festival, the most important Italian prog festival. On 21 July 2019 the band has performed at Europe's biggest prog rock festival, the Night_of_the_Prog festival in Germany.

For the 40th anniversary of the album "The Wall" Ranestrane have released their own version of the original album as a soundtrack to the film Pink Floyd - The Wall by Alan Parker in the usual RanestRane manner of "Cineconcerto".

Apocalypse Now: il cineconcertoThe last RanestRane project expected on 21 May 2022, is  that as usual will be their very personal interpretation to the film of directed and produced by Francis Ford Coppola.

== Discography ==
Studio albums

- 2007: Nosferatu Il Vampiro (2013 remastered)
- 2011: Shining
- 2013: Monolith - A Space Odyssey Part One
- 2015: H.A.L. - A Space Odyssey Part Two
- 2018: Starchild - A Space Odyssey Final Part
- 2020: The Wall (Pink Floyd tribute)
- 2022: Apocalypse Now

Concert albums

- 2014: Live in Tokyo (recorded at the Italian Prog Rock Festival in Japan with Enzo Vita)
- 2014: Monolith in Rome (recorded at Crossroads Live Club in Rome with Steve Rothery, Audio-CD and DVD)
- 2016: Friends, Romans: H Natural with RanestRane (recorded in Rome in September 2015 with Steve Hogarth, Audio-CD)
- 2025: SPQR (Live from Sala Sinopoli, Roma) Steve Hogarth with RanestRane

Auditorium Parco della Musica in Rome

Videos

- 2016: Friends, Romans: H Natural with RanestRane (recorded in Rome in September 2015 with Steve Hogarth, DVD)
- 2018: RanestRane Live: Greetings from Veruno
- 2025: SPQR (Live from Sala Sinopoli, Roma) Steve Hogarth with RanestRane

Auditorium Parco della Musica in Rome - Double CD/ Blu Ray

Compilations

- A Space Odyssey - Deluxe Edition (Vinyl Box Set)
