= Marillion.com =

marillion.com

Studio album by Marillion
- Released: 18 October 1999
- Recorded: December 1998 – August 1999
- Studio: The Racket Club (Buckinghamshire)
- Genre: Neo-prog
- Length: 62:28 (Note: Intact RAWCD 144)
- Label: Intact
- Producer: Marillion; Steven Wilson

Marillion chronology
Radiation (1998)	marillion.com (1999)	Anoraknophobia (2001)

Professional ratings
Review scores
Source	Rating
AllMusic	3/5 stars

marillion.com is the eleventh studio album by the British neo-prog band Marillion, released on 18 October 1999 by their own label, Intact Records, and distributed by Castle Communications.

== Background ==
It was the last of the three recordings the band made on a contract with Castle between being dropped by EMI Records in 1995 and eventually becoming independent in the 2000s. Continuing Marillion's decline in mainstream success, it became the first album to fail to reach the UK Top 40, peaking at number 53 and staying in the charts for just one week. It was also their first album from which no singles were released officially. However, "Deserve" was used as a promo single, and "Rich" served as a radio single in Brazil.

Recorded at the band's own studio, The Racket Club, between December 1998 and August 1999, marillion.com was self-produced with additional production from Steven Wilson on five out of nine tracks. The tracks "Tumble Down the Years" and "Interior Lulu" were first recorded and mixed during the recording sessions for Radiation (1998), but it was decided not to include them on that album as the band thought the songs were incomplete, and re-recorded them to this album.

The track "House" features a laid-back dub influence and had the working titles "The Massive Attack Song" and "This House Aches". "House" was about the disintegration of Steve Hogarth's marriage; he said, "The house seemed to somehow ooze the pain we were in, even when nobody was there. There wasn’t a level to which I could turn up the hi-fi that drowned out the silence that was still there."

The title of the album is a reference to Marillion's then-new approach in using the Internet to communicate with their fans and in particular to ensure the financing of projects that would later become known as "crowdfunding". In 1997, fans had funded a North American tour, which the Red Ant label had been unable to support, by means of an Internet campaign, and the next album, Anoraknophobia, would be completely financed by pre-orders, making the band independent from record company support, except for distribution. The line "Thank God for the Internet" from the track "Interior Lulu" (although used ironically in the original context) can also be read as an allusion to Marillion's internet activities, and was in fact used as a slogan later.

While preparing the album, the band's management invited fans to send them passport photographs and 732 of these were then used to make up the artwork for the slipcase. As the eleventh studio album, the number 11 can be seen in the "LL" of the name "marillion" on the cover. The front cover was taken in London at the intersection of Long Acre and the Garrick St looking at Great Newport St near the Palace Theatre.

In 2012, the independent label Madfish, a division of Snapper Music, re-released marillion.com as a deluxe edition (Note: Madfish: SMACD976) packaged in a 36-page digibook format with an additional artwork designed by Carl Glover, and as a limited double 180gm heavyweight vinyl edition (Note: Madfish: SMALP976) featuring a slightly modified track listing.

== Track listing ==
All lyrics are written by Steve Hogarth, except where noted; all music is composed by Marillion.

No.	Title	Lyrics	Length
1.	"A Legacy"	John Helmer	6:16
2.	"Deserve"		4:23
3.	"Go!"		6:11
4.	"Rich"		5:43
5.	"Enlightened"		4:59
6.	"Built-in Bastard Radar"	Helmer	4:52
7.	"Tumble Down the Years"	Helmer	4:33
8.	"Interior Lulu"	Hogarth, Helmer	15:14
9.	"House"		10:15
Total length:			62:28

=== 2012 Madfish 2xLP edition ===
Side one

1. "A Legacy"
2. "Deserve"
3. "Go!"

Side two

1. "Rich"
2. "Enlightened"
3. "Built-in Bastard Radar"

Side three

1. "Interior Lulu"
2. "Tumble Down the Years"

Side four

1. "House"

(Actual vinyl tracklisting, the LP sleeve is incorrect for sides 3 and 4)

== Personnel ==
Credits are adapted from the album's 1999 liner notes.

Marillion

- Steve Hogarth – vocals, additional piano and percussion
- Steve Rothery – guitars
- Mark Kelly – keyboards
- Pete Trewavas – bass, additional guitar (on "Tumble Down the Years"), and backing vocals
- Ian Mosley – drums and percussion

Additional musicians

- Ben Castle – saxophone (on "Deserve")
- Neil Yates – trumpet (on "Deserve" and "House")
- Andy Rotherham – additional hand-clapping (on "Rich")

Technical personnel

- Steven Wilson – additional production, and mixing (at No-Man's Land, Hemel Hempstead, Hertfordshire, England) (tracks 1, 3, 5, 6 and 8)
- Stewart Every – recording
- Nick Davis – mixing (at The Forge, Oswestry, Shropshire, England) (tracks 2, 4 and 7)
- Trevor Vallis – mixing (at The Racket Club, Buckinghamshire, England) (track 9)
- Bill Smith Studio – sleeve design
- Carl Glover – photography
- Niels van Iperen – group photography

== Charts ==
Chart (1999)	Peak position
Dutch Albums (Album Top 100)	40
French Albums (SNEP)	66
German Albums (Offizielle Top 100)	55
Scottish Albums (OCC)	90
UK Albums (OCC)	53
UK Independent Albums (OCC)	4

Chart (2026)	Peak position
Belgian Albums (Ultratop Wallonia)	172
German Albums (Offizielle Top 100)	10
German Rock & Metal Albums (Offizielle Top 100)	3
Norwegian Physical Albums (IFPI Norge)	3
Swiss Albums (Schweizer Hitparade)	47
