= Holidays in Eden =

Studio album by Marillion
- Released: 24 June 1991
- Studio: Hook End, Oxfordshire, England; Westside, London, England
- Genre: Pop rock; neo-prog
- Length: 48:17 (Note: EMI CDP 796822 2, CDEMD 1022)
- Label: EMI
- Producer: Christopher Neil

Marillion chronology
Seasons End (1989)	Holidays in Eden (1991)	A Singles Collection (1992)

Alternative cover
- 1992 US edition

Singles from Holidays in Eden
- 1. "Cover My Eyes (Pain and Heaven)" Released: 27 May 1991; 2. "No One Can" Released: 22 July 1991; 3. "Dry Land" Released: 23 September 1991

Professional ratings
Review scores
Source	Rating
AllMusic	2.5/5 stars
Q	4/5 stars

Holidays in Eden is the sixth studio album by the British neo-prog band Marillion, released in 1991. Recorded at Hook End Manor in Oxfordshire and Westside Studios in London, it was the band's second album with vocalist Steve Hogarth and the first completely written without previous lead singer Fish.

Partly due to producer Christopher Neil, many of the songs feature a mainstream pop rock sound as opposed to progressive rock of previous works, and Hogarth has described Holidays in Eden as "Marillion's 'pop'est album ever". It reached number 7 in the UK Albums Chart.

== Background ==
Hogarth said in 2012:

"Holidays was probably the most commercial album overall that we made or had the greatest amount of commercial songs on it. Obviously "Splintering Heart" or "This Town" is not exactly pop music. There were things within that album that were not overtly commercial at all but we had taken a decision to work with a pop producer; Chris Neil (It was EMI's influence). Originally that album was going to be made with Chris Kimsey who the band had worked with a lot and who did Misplaced Childhood, more of a rock'n roll producer, he was actually making the Stones's Steel Wheels album with them while we were rehearsing. In the end the Stones served him with a writ, preventing him working with anybody else but them for the next year, we had suddenly lost our producer and EMI came in and our A&R man suggested Chris Neil who was known as a pop producer. There was that feeling that this could be an experiment and we were quite reluctant to meet him. He won us round by introducing himself as Marillion being his son's favourite band. He told us that his son would never forgive him if he made a crap record so we did that with him. That was probably why Holidays in Eden was so poppy, and then we reacted to that and went 360 degrees.

== Release ==
Holidays in Eden was released in Europe on 24 June 1991 by EMI Records on CD, LP (Note: EMI 064-79 6822 1) and cassette. It peaked at number 7 in the UK, spending 7 weeks in the charts, and became Marillion's first studio album not to gain any sales certification. The album reached number 7 in the Netherlands and number 10 in Germany.

In the US, Holidays in Eden was issued on 25 February 1992 by the I.R.S. Records label on CD (Note: I.R.S. X2-13138) and cassette. The American edition featured two new tracks, "A Collection" and "How Can It Hurt", which were the B-sides of the original "No One Can" and "Cover My Eyes (Pain and Heaven)" singles, respectively. In addition, the track order was rearranged and the title for "No One Can" was lengthened by adding "… Take You Away from Me". Finally, slightly different cover art was used, featuring the original cover overlaid with the new "MAR" "ILL" "ION" logo and the album title in the middle left of the cover in a straight line, rather than the original circle around the moon at the centre top.

As part of a series of Marillion's first eight studio albums, EMI Records re-released Holidays in Eden on 23 February 1998 with 24-bit digital remastered sound and a second disc containing bonus tracks. (Note: EMI 7243 4 93372 2 0) A new 180g heavy weight vinyl pressing (Note: EMI 50999 621807 1 9, VEMD 1022) identical to the original 1991 edition was released in 2012.

Three singles, "Cover My Eyes (Pain and Heaven)", "No One Can" and "Dry Land" were released, with the first preceding the album. "Cover My Eyes (Pain and Heaven)" was a re-write of Hogarth's earlier band How We Live's song "Simon's Car". "Dry Land" had previously been the title track of How We Live's only album released in 1987. Each of the three singles were minor hits in the UK attaining Top 40 spots.

At the Marillion Weekend 2011, the band performed the entire album with a slightly revised track order ("Waiting to Happen" moved to the fifth spot), the two additional tracks from the US CD and two unrelated songs as encores. This was released as part of the DVD/Blu-Ray set Holidays in Zélande, but also as a standalone CD Holidays in Eden 2011.

== Cover art ==
As with the previous release, Seasons End, the cover art was designed by Bill Smith Studio using a monochromatic painting by illustrator Sarah Ball showing various stylised animals, a tree with a snake around it at the centre, and dominated by a darkish blue colour for the front cover. Holidays in Eden was Marillion's first album not to feature their original logo in any recognisable form, using the band name in a normal typeface instead.

== Track listing ==
All tracks are written by Steve Hogarth, Steve Rothery, Mark Kelly, Pete Trewavas and Ian Mosley, except where noted.

Side one
No.	Title	Length
1.	"Splintering Heart"	6:52
2.	"Cover My Eyes (Pain and Heaven)"	3:55
3.	"The Party"	5:37
4.	"No One Can"	4:40

Side two
No.	Title	Writer(s)	Length
5.	"Holidays in Eden"	Hogarth, Rothery, Kelly, Trewavas, Mosley, John Helmer	5:28
6.	"Dry Land"	Hogarth, Colin Woore	4:43
7.	"Waiting to Happen"		4:56
8.	"This Town"		3:19
9.	"The Rakes Progress"		1:54
10.	"100 Nights"		6:42
Total length:			48:17

1998 remastered edition bonus disc
No.	Title	Writer(s)	Length
1.	"Sympathy"	Mark Ashton, Graham Stansfield, David Kaffinetti, Stephen Gould	3:29
2.	"How Can It Hurt"		4:11
3.	"A Collection"	Hogarth, Rothery, Kelly, Trewavas, Mosley, Helmer	2:59
4.	"Cover My Eyes" (acoustic version, recorded at The Racket Club acoustic sessions May '92)		2:34
5.	"Sympathy" (acoustic version, recorded at The Racket Club acoustic sessions May '92)	Ashton, Stansfield, Kaffinetti, Gould	2:31
6.	"I Will Walk on Water" (alternative mix)		5:14
7.	"Splintering Heart" (live at the Moles Club)		6:41
8.	"You Don't Need Anyone" (Moles Club demo, recorded December '90)	Hogarth	4:03
9.	"No One Can" (Moles Club demo, recorded December '90)		4:51
10.	"The Party" (Moles Club demo, recorded December '90)		5:45
11.	"This Town" (Moles Club demo, recorded December '90)		4:15
12.	"Waiting to Happen" (Moles Club demo, recorded December '90)		5:31
13.	"Eric"		2:31
14.	"The Epic (Fairground)" (Mushroom Farm demo, recorded March '89)		8:31
Total length:			63:13

- Tracks 6, 8–14 of the 1998 remastered edition bonus disc had previously been unreleased.

1992 US edition
No.	Title	Length
1.	"Cover My Eyes"	3:56
2.	"No One Can Take You Away from Me"	4:39
3.	"Splintering Heart"	6:51
4.	"The Party"	5:36
5.	"A Collection"	2:58
6.	"Holidays in Eden"	5:58
7.	"How Can It Hurt"	4:09
8.	"Dry Land"	4:42
9.	"Waiting to Happen"	4:55
10.	"This Town"	3:18
11.	"The Rakes Progress"	1:54
12.	"100 Nights"	6:42

== Personnel ==
Marillion

- Steve Hogarth – vocals
- Steve Rothery – guitar; photography (1998 remastered edition)
- Mark Kelly – keyboards
- Pete Trewavas – bass and backing vocals
- Ian Mosley – drums and percussion

Technical personnel

- Christopher Neil – production and backing vocals
- Rob Eaton – recording and mixing
- Ted Jensen – mastering (at Sterling Sound, New York City)
- Peter Mew – 1998 digital remastering (November 1997 at Abbey Road, London)
- Bill Smith Studio – design
- Sarah Ball – illustration
- Paul Cox – photography

== Charts ==
=== Weekly charts ===
Chart (1991)	Peak position
Dutch Albums (Album Top 100)	7
German Albums (Offizielle Top 100)	10
Swedish Albums (Sverigetopplistan)	36
Swiss Albums (Schweizer Hitparade)	17
UK Albums (OCC)	7

Chart (2022–2023)	Peak position
Belgian Albums (Ultratop Flanders)	62
Belgian Albums (Ultratop Wallonia)	39
Hungarian Albums (MAHASZ)	17
Polish Albums (ZPAV)	43
Scottish Albums (OCC)	16

=== Year-end charts ===
Chart (1991)	Position
Dutch Albums (Album Top 100)	83
German Albums (Offizielle Top 100)	89
