= The Europeans (band) =

British new wave band

- Origin: London, England
- Genres: New wave
- Years active: 1980–1985
- Label: A&M Records
- Past members: Steve Hogarth; Colin Woore; Ferg Harper; Geoff Dugmore

The Europeans were a British new wave group formed in 1981 and disbanded in 1985. They released three albums, none of which achieved much in terms of chart position. In 1989, their former keyboard player and co-lead vocalist Steve Hogarth joined Marillion as lead vocalist. The Europeans should not be confused with the similarly named Europeans, a Bristol band that were active 1977–1979.

== History ==
In 1980, a Scottish band called Motion Pictures (consisting of Harper, Woore, Dugmore) moved to London and advertised for a keyboard player. Steve Hogarth, who had recently moved to London from Doncaster, was chosen. The band rehearsed in Shepperton, changing their name to The Europeans in early 1981.

Their first appearance on record was as the backing band on John Otway's All Balls and No Willy in 1982. They signed to A&M Records in 1982. Three singles were released before the first album Vocabulary: "The Animal Song", "A.E.I.O.U." and "Recognition". All lead vocals were handled by Harper, except "Kingdom Come" which was sung by Hogarth. Kiki Dee and Toni Childs were among the backing vocalists. Another single, "American People" was released, and the band toured extensively.

The second album, Live was released in February 1984. The LP reached No. 100 in the UK Albums Chart. Later in 1984, the Hogarth-penned "Listen" was released as a single.

A free promo single, "Acid Rain", was released to promote their second studio album (the third overall), Recurring Dreams, which became available in October 1984. Hogarth sang lead vocals on five of the eight tracks. When the managing director of A&M left the company a day after the release of the album, promotion took a nosedive. Hogarth and Woore left, forming How We Live in 1985 and signing to CBS.

In August 2005, Recurring Dreams was re-released on CD by Marillion's label Racket Records. The re-issue features liner notes not included in the original 1984 vinyl release.

== Line-up ==
- Colin Woore – guitars, backing vocals
- Ferg Harper – bass, lead vocals
- Geoff Dugmore – drums, percussion, electronics, backing vocals
- Steve Hogarth – keyboards, programming, lead and backing vocals

== Discography ==
=== Studio albums ===
- Vocabulary (1983)
- Recurring Dreams (1984)

=== Live albums ===
- Live (1984) - UK No. 100

=== Singles ===
- "The Animal Song" (1982) - AUS #96
- "AEIOU" (1983)
- "Recognition" (1983)
- "American People" (1983)
- "Typical" (live) (1984)
- "Listen" (1984)

=== EPs ===
- Recognition (1983)

=== Compilation appearances ===
- The Snoopies Album (1981) - various artists compilation

== Bibliography ==
- Anne-Aurore Inquimbert, Marillion. L'ère Hogarth, Camion Blanc (France), 2014, 222 p.
