= Dave Meegan =

British record producer (born 1963)

Dave Meegan is an Irish record producer, born in Dublin in 1963. Meegan is best known for his work with Marillion.

Meegan's association with Marillion began when he worked as an assistant engineer on their second album, Fugazi in 1984. He got a job as a tape operator and trained under Trevor Horn in Sarm Studios. Meegan worked for U2 as an engineer during the sessions for The Joshua Tree and Rattle and Hum, and has also worked alongside Peter Collins, Shep Pettibone and Stephen Hague, as an engineer.

In 1989 Meegan produced most of the tracks on the album The House of Love, and in 1991 he produced Slinky, by the Milltown Brothers, and in 1992, 2 Hell with Common Sense, by Power of Dreams.

Meegan returned to Marillion, and produced their albums Brave, a concept album released in 1994, and Afraid of Sunlight, which were their final two albums released on EMI in the 1990s. Meegan also mixed their 1997 album This Strange Engine. He returned as a producer for their 2001 album Anoraknophobia, and their 2004 album, Marbles, containing the single "You're Gone" which reached number 7 in the UK Singles Chart, the band's highest-charting single since Steve Hogarth replaced original singer Fish in 1989. Marillion guitarist Steve Rothery has said he admired Meegan's work so much he considered him to be "a sixth member of the band".

Meegan stopped working as a producer for several years for personal reasons, but more recently, he has worked with Andrew Maxwell Morris.
