= Seasons End =

1989 studio album by Marillion

Studio album by Marillion
- Released: 25 September 1989
- Recorded: 1989
- Studios: Hook End Recording Studios (Oxfordshire, England)
- Genre: Neo-prog
- Length: 47:35 (vinyl edition); 50:55 (single CD edition); 99:25 (double CD edition)
- Labels: EMI (worldwide except America and Canada); Capitol (America, Canada)
- Producers: Marillion; Nick Davis

Marillion chronology
The Thieving Magpie (1988)	Seasons End (1989)	Holidays in Eden (1991)

Singles from Seasons End
- 1. "Hooks in You" Released: 28 August 1989; 2. "The Uninvited Guest" Released: 27 November 1989; 3. "Easter" Released: 19 March 1990

Seasons End is the fifth studio album by British neo-prog band Marillion, released in 1989. The album was the first to feature current lead vocalist Steve Hogarth, following the departure of former vocalist Fish in late 1988. It reached number 7 on the UK Albums Chart.

== Overview ==
Following the departure of Fish, Marillion started to audition singers while writing the new album, and they eventually chose Steve Hogarth. The music for Seasons End was mostly written before Hogarth joined Marillion, and only a couple of songs on it actually have some pieces written by him, these being "Easter" and "The Space". A number of the lyrics were written by John Helmer, who the band had commissioned before Hogarth joined. Helmer would continue to contribute lyrics throughout the 1990s. "The Space" was partly recycled from an unreleased song by Hogarth's old band How We Live titled "Wrapped in the Flag".

The bonus disc of the 1999 re-issue of Clutching at Straws contains a number of nascent versions of songs that would end up on Seasons End with vocals and lyrics by Fish, these demos having been produced during the writing sessions for the ill-fated fifth studio album with Fish. (A number of the lyrical concepts from these demos, such as The Voice in the Crowd, would later resurface on Fish's debut studio album, Vigil in a Wilderness of Mirrors.)

The album was produced jointly by Marillion and Nick Davis (who would go on to work with Genesis and associated acts). On 28 April 1989 the band went to Outside Studios at Hook End Manor, Stoke Row, Oxfordshire to record the album.

== Singles ==
As with Marillion's previous two studio albums, three singles were released from Seasons End. The first single was "Hooks in You" in August 1989, followed by "The Uninvited Guest" in November and "Easter" in March 1990. "Easter" was released as in cassette format on 19 March 1990 and in other formats 26 March 1990. It became a UK Top 40 hit when issued as a single in 1990. As with many Marillion songs, the album version features an extended guitar solo by Steve Rothery, which has become a fan-favourite, although it is heavily edited for the single version. The song was written by singer Steve Hogarth before he joined the band in 1989 and was inspired by The Troubles in Northern Ireland. The title is in reference to Easter 1916 by William Butler Yeats. Portions of the music video were filmed on the Giants Causeway.

== Cover art ==
Mark Wilkinson, who had designed all previous Marillion covers, had been asked to provide the artwork but declined, as the band wanted to have a landscape painting, which wasn't his style. Wilkinson would continue to collaborate with Fish, designing the album covers for almost all his solo albums. Therefore, the album also marked a turning point in the band's visual style, towards a more "modern", photographic look created by Bill Smith Studio (including Carl Glover, who would continue working with Marillion after leaving the studio). The four square fields dominating the cover symbolise the four classical elements, earth, air, water and fire (clockwise from top left). At the same time, the cover contained some references to the past: It used the band's original logo, which had been replaced with a "modernised" version on the previous album Clutching at Straws and related releases as well as on B'Sides Themselves (although the 1988 live retrospective The Thieving Magpie also used it). The feather in the "desert" square is a reference to the image of the "magpie" found on Misplaced Childhood (1985) and Fugazi, the "sky" square contains a fragment of the "Jester's" dress introduced on Script for a Jester's Tear (1983), the chameleon in the "fire" square appears on Script for a Jester's Tear, Fugazi (1984) and Misplaced Childhood; the painting with the clown's face falling into the water upside-down is taken from the Fugazi cover. Also, the vinyl version returned to the gatefold format that had been abandoned on the previous studio album.

== Lyrics ==
The lyrics on Seasons End, unlike those of the two previous albums, are not tied together by a common storyline. The opener, "The King of Sunset Town", in John Helmer's original version, was about poverty; however, Hogarth modified it under the impression of the brutal oppression of the Tiananmen Square protests of 1989 by the Chinese government; the line "And everyone assembled here / Remembers how it used to be / Before the 27th came" refers to the 27th Army involved in the massacre. "Easter" addresses The Troubles of Northern Ireland (a topic Fish had previously explored in "Forgotten Sons" on 1983's Script for a Jester's Tear); more indirectly, this also goes for "Holloway Girl", which refers to the wrongful imprisonment of Judith Ward in Holloway Prison for IRA bombings; she was released from prison in 1992, three years after this album's release. "Seasons End" addresses climate change (a topic to which Marillion would return in 1998 and 2007) – the spelling of the title is intentional, referring not to the end of a season (which would be "Season's End"), but the end of all seasons as a result of global warming eliminating winter altogether. "Berlin" describes the situation in the divided city of Berlin, where Marillion had recorded Misplaced Childhood; the Berlin Wall would eventually come down just weeks after the release of Seasons End.

Regarding "The Space", Steve Hogarth has said that "this song kind of started life in Amsterdam. When I was quite young I saw a tram come down the road and someone had parked a car too close to the tram line. It came down the road and it just tore the side off this car because it couldn't do anything else. It made the most fantastic noise as it did so. Fortunately there was nobody in the car and fortunately the trams in Amsterdam are very thick so I'm not sure the driver even noticed it happen. Years later when I was feeling a bit more like a rock star than I did when I saw it happen, I was thinking about my life. It occurred to me that I was a bit like that tram when I probably ripped the side of a few things I hadn't even felt and I hadn't slowed down either and I probably hadn't noticed. So the words to this song came from that realization. It was one of the first songs we put together when we met in January of 1989."

== Critical reception ==
Professional ratings
Review scores
Source	Rating
AllMusic	4.5/5 stars
Hi-Fi News & Record Review	A:2
Progressiveworld.net	5/5 stars

Mick Wall, writing in Kerrang!, stated, "Vocally and lyrically, of course, we find ourselves on new ground. Hogarth's certainly got a voice, smooth as glass and emotive as hell. And, in common with his more famous predecessor, it's a very un-American voice, the vowel sounds are all Queen's English. But there the comparisons end. Steve Hogarth is no Fish clone. He's no Peter Gabriel nor Phil Collins apologist, either. He doesn't need to be. He's got a voice of his own – and when you listen to it on tracks like 'Easter', and 'Seasons End' or 'After Me', you can almost forget the band ever had another singer."

Allmusic reviewer describes "Easter" as "heartfelt" with an "imaginative electric-acoustic arrangement".

== Track listing ==
No.	Title	Writer(s)	Length
1.	"The King of Sunset Town"	Steve Hogarth, Steve Rothery, Mark Kelly, Pete Trewavas, Ian Mosley, John Helmer	8:04
2.	"Easter"	Hogarth, Rothery, Kelly, Trewavas, Mosley	5:58
3.	"The Uninvited Guest"	Hogarth, Rothery, Kelly, Trewavas, Mosley, Helmer	3:52
4.	"Seasons End"	Hogarth, Rothery, Kelly, Trewavas, Mosley, Helmer	8:10
5.	"Holloway Girl"	Hogarth, Rothery, Kelly, Trewavas, Mosley	4:30
6.	"Berlin"	Hogarth, Rothery, Kelly, Trewavas, Mosley, Helmer	7:48
7.	"After Me" (Not included on vinyl edition)	Hogarth, Rothery, Kelly, Trewavas, Mosley	3:20
8.	"Hooks in You"	Hogarth, Rothery, Kelly, Trewavas, Mosley, Helmer	2:57
9.	"The Space…"	Hogarth, Rothery, Kelly, Trewavas, Mosley	6:14

== Formats and re-issues ==
The album was originally released on CD, Cassette, vinyl LP and 12" Picture Disc. "After Me", the b-side of "Hooks in You", was included as a bonus track on the original CD and cassette versions. In 1997, as part of a series of Marillion's first eight studio albums, EMI re-released Seasons End with remastered sound and a second disc containing bonus material. The bonus disc contained the extended 12" version of the album's second single, "The Uninvited Guest", that single's b-side "The Bell in the Sea", the third single "Easter"'s b-side, "The Release", and six demo versions. The remastered edition was later also made available without the bonus disc.

A new 180-gram vinyl pressing was released in February 2012 by EMI. It was identical to the original vinyl release from 1989, so "After Me" was not included.

== Personnel ==
Marillion

- Steve Hogarth: vocals
- Steve Rothery: guitars
- Mark Kelly: keyboards
- Pete Trewavas: bass
- Ian Mosley: drums

With:

- Phil Todd: saxophone on "Berlin"
- Jean-Pierre Rasle: pipes on "Easter"

== Charts ==
Chart performance for Seasons End
Album chart (1989)	Peak position
Dutch Albums (Album Top 100)	20
German Albums (Offizielle Top 100)	11
Norwegian Albums (VG-lista)	20
Swedish Albums (Sverigetopplistan)	28
Swiss Albums (Schweizer Hitparade)	11
UK Albums (Official Charts)	7

2023 chart performance for Seasons End
Album chart (2023)	Peak position
Belgian Albums (Ultratop Wallonia)	166
Hungarian Albums (MAHASZ)	18
Scottish Albums (Official Charts)	23
UK Progressive Albums (Official Charts)	20
UK Rock & Metal Albums (Official Charts)	5

"Easter" (1990)	Position
UK Singles Chart	34

== Certifications ==
Certifications for Seasons End
Region	Certification	Certified units/sales
United Kingdom (BPI)	Gold	100,000^{^}
^{^} Shipments figures based on certification alone.
