= Steve Hogarth =

English singer (born 1956)

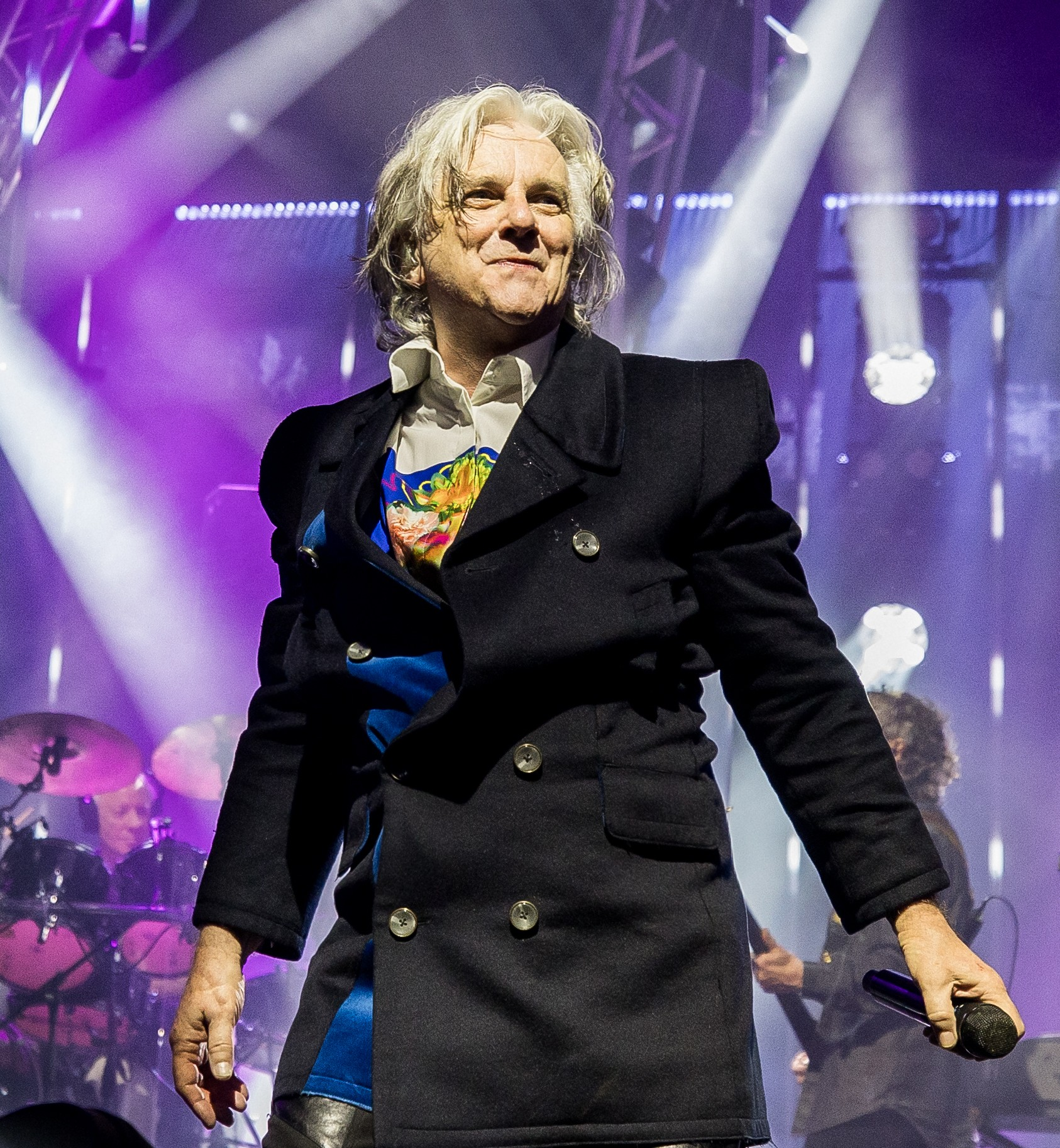
- Hogarth in 2025

Background information
- Also known as: h
- Born: Ronald Stephen Hoggarth; 14 May 1956 (age 70); Kendal, Westmorland, England
- Genres: Art pop; new wave; neo-prog; pop rock
- Occupations: Singer; musician; songwriter
- Instruments: Vocals; keyboard; guitar
- Years active: 1977–present
- Member of: Marillion
- Formerly of: Harlow; The Neutrinos; The Europeans; How We Live; The h-Band
- Website: stevehogarth.com

Steve Hogarth (born Ronald Stephen Hoggarth, 14 May 1956), also known as "h", is an English musician. Since 1989, he has been the lead singer of the rock band Marillion, for which he also performs additional keyboards and guitar. Hogarth was formerly a keyboard player and co-lead vocalist with the Europeans and vocalist with How We Live. AllMusic has described Hogarth as having a "unique, expressive voice" with "flexible range and beautiful phrasing". In 2026, Loudwire ranked him as the 8th greatest progressive rock singer of all time.

== Early life ==
Hogarth was born in Kendal, Westmorland, England. His father was an engineer in the British Merchant Navy. He was brought up on a council estate in Doncaster, South Yorkshire, from the age of two. As a child he became interested in music, his earliest influences being the Beatles and the Kinks, and taught himself to play piano.

Leaving school at the age of eighteen, Hogarth spent three years studying for a degree in electrical engineering at Trent Polytechnic (now Nottingham Trent University). He was also a member of a band during this time, Harlow, who played working men's clubs. They recorded the single "Harry de Mazzio" on the Pepper record label, which Hogarth wrote and later described as "dreadful" and "definitely the worst record I ever made." The band split in 1981 and Hogarth left his engineering degree, moving to London to further his music career.

== Career ==
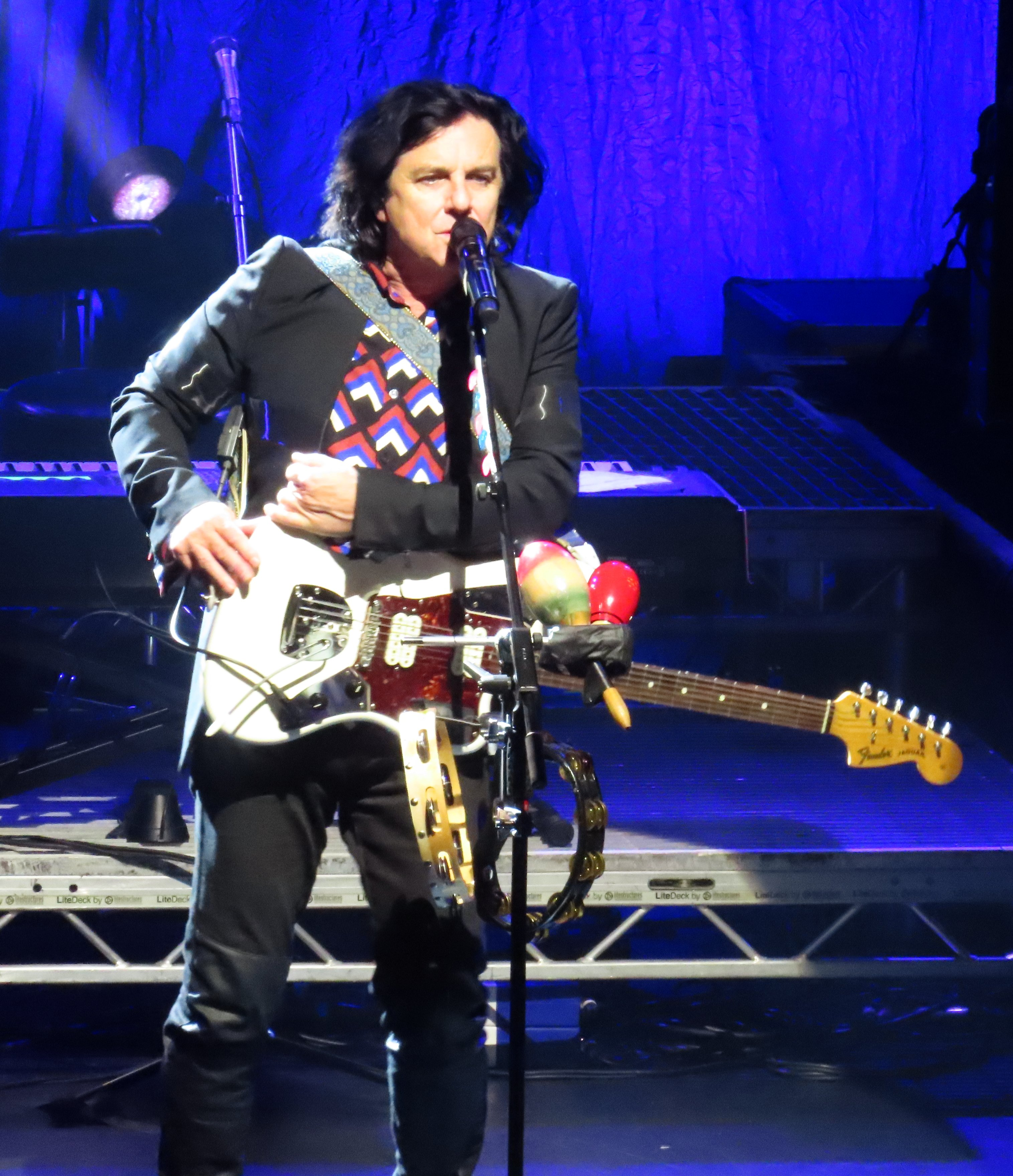
Hogarth live with Marillion in 2021

In London, after responding to an advertisement in the music press Hogarth joined the band Motion Pictures. They were subsequently renamed the Europeans. Initially joining just as a keyboard player, Hogarth later shared the vocal duties with Ferg Harper. Signed to A&M Records, the Europeans released two studio albums and one live album. Hogarth sang just one track on the first studio album but sang five of the eight tracks on the second album.

In 1985, Hogarth and guitarist Colin Woore left the band to form How We Live, The duo were signed to Columbia Records. In 1987, following record company changes, How We Live's debut album Dry Land was unsuccessful. Hogarth considered leaving the music industry and becoming a milkman or postman. However, a meeting with his publishers arranged by a friend, Darryl Way, a founding member of Curved Air, persuaded him to send a tape to Marillion, who were recruiting for a new lead vocalist following the departure of Fish in late 1988.

Marillion heard the tape and were interested enough to ask for a meeting with the singer. Later accounts of this first meeting record that Hogarth turned up at band member Pete Trewavas' house with his demo tapes contained in a red plastic fire bucket – the audition taking place in Trewavas' garage, due to the presence of cats in the house (see below). The band were immediately impressed by his vocal prowess. Hogarth himself, however, took a little longer to make up his mind, holding as he did at the time a potentially lucrative offer to tour the U.S. on keyboards with The The. As he later recalled in a 2001 interview by Classic Rock, he had a choice "between the most hip band in the world, and the least...". In the end he accepted the position with Marillion, won over as the band wanted an equal partner and were offering a potentially permanent arrangement.

Hogarth's first album with the band, released in September 1989, was Seasons End, their fifth studio album. Since then, Marillion have recorded a further fourteen studio, and numerous live albums, with Hogarth on vocals, the most recent being An Hour Before It's Dark released in March 2022.

Hogarth has also released one solo studio album under the name 'h' called Ice Cream Genius. This album had contributions from ex-Japan/ Porcupine Tree synthesiser/keyboard maestro Richard Barbieri, former XTC guitarist Dave Gregory, Blondie drummer Clem Burke, bassist Chucho Merchan and percussionist Luís Jardim.

Subsequently, Hogarth's side-project, The H-Band, has played live across the UK and Europe featuring a variety of musicians, including former the Stone Roses MKII guitarist Aziz Ibrahim, Massive Attack and the Bays drummer Andy Gangadeen, session musician Jingles on bass, Aziz's regular musical partner Dalbir Singh Rattan on tablas and Stephanie Sobey-Jones on cello. With Barbieri and Gregory, this line up recorded a double album entitled Live Spirit: Live Body at Dingwalls on 8 and 9 August 2001. It was released one year later.

In 2006, Hogarth undertook a solo tour, 'h Natural', during which he played around 20 dates in the UK and Europe . It was billed as an evening of music and conversation with Hogarth at the piano. These shows were mixed and released for download, one at a time and for a limited period only, on Hogarth's (now defunct) H-Tunes website.

On 14 May 2010, Hogarth performed at the Relentless Garage in London to celebrate his birthday. On the following two days he also performed in Liverpool and Sheffield. To coincide with these shows a CD was released featuring some of the best tracks taken from his H Natural shows. This collection is called H Natural Selection and was available at the shows and from the Marillion website.

In 2012, Hogarth joined forces with Richard Barbieri again, releasing an album as a duo called Not the Weapon But the Hand.

In 2014, it was announced that Hogarth was releasing two volumes of diaries, written between 1991 and 2014. The first was released in June 2014 by Miwk Publishing and is called The Invisible Man. Volume 2 followed in December 2014.

Hogarth collaborated with Swedish chamber-rock band Isildurs Bane on an album titled Colours Not Found in Nature, released in 2017. Hogarth had written the lyrics and recorded the vocals in hotel rooms around the world while on tour with Marillion.

== Personal life ==
Hogarth has three children: a daughter named Sofi and a son named Nial with his first wife Sue, and a son named Emil from his current relationship with Linette, who is from Denmark.

Hogarth is violently allergic to cats, first learning this when hospitalised as a child after visiting a Liverpudlian aunt "...whose house was full of 'em!" Marillion bass player Pete Trewavas had cats in January 1989 when they had their first meeting so Hogarth could not enter his house.

Hogarth is a fan of the football club Manchester United.

== Musical inspirations ==
In an interview for HuffPost in 2012, Hogarth cited the Blue Nile, Paddy McAloon, Mike Scott, John Lennon, David Bowie and Joni Mitchell as musical inspirations, and Peter Gabriel, Sting and Massive Attack as artists he would like to work with. On Sting, Hogarth commented: "It's weird how few artists mention Sting and pull him out but he's such a brilliant talent."

== Solo discography ==
- 1997: Ice Cream Genius
- 1998: Ice Cream Genius (Re-release)
- 2002: Live Spirit: Live Body (Double)
- 2010: H Natural Selection
- 2012: Not the Weapon But the Hand (with Richard Barbieri)
- 2013: Arc Light (with Richard Barbieri)
- 2017: Friends, Romans (with RanestRane)
- 2023: Waiting To Be Born (with Richard Barbieri)
- 2023: Live Spirit: Live Body (Double, Re-Release)
- 2026: S.P.Q.R. Live From Sala Sinopoli, Roma

== Guest appearances ==
- 1982: All Balls & No Willy – John Otway (keyboards)
- 1983: Once Bitten – Annabel Lamb (keyboards)
- 1985: Domestic Harmony – Do-Ré-Mi (keyboards)
- 1986: Infected – The The: (piano on "Heartland")
- 1987: Blue Yonder – Blue Yonder (backing vocals)
- 1987: Saint Julian – Julian Cope (backing vocals)
- 1988: Union – Toni Childs (keyboards)
- 1990: Sailing – Rock Against Repatriation (vocals)
- 1998: Ocean Songs – Chucho Merchan (vocals)
- 1998: The Emperor Falls – John Wesley (backing vocals on "An Ordinary Man" and "So Bad")
- 1999: Five Years in a LIVETime (video) – Dream Theater (keyboards, vocals)
- 2007: Systematic Chaos – Dream Theater (spoken voice)
- 2011: Till Then We Wait- Sun Domingo (vocals)
- 2011: "The Awakening" – Edison's Children (vocals)
- 2012: Paintings in Minor Lila – Egbert Derix (narration on "This Train Is My Life")
- 2012: Speak – I and Thou (vocal on "Go or Go Ahead")
- 2014: Music For Trains – Peter Brown (Spoken vocal on "Houdini Highs")
- 2015: Gitanos Catalans: 20 Anys de Sabor de Gràcia – Sabor de Gràcia
- 2015: Please Come Home – Lonely Robot (piano and backing vocals on "Why Do We Stay" and "Humans Being")
- 2017: Colours Not Found In Nature – Isildurs Bane & Steve Hogarth (lead vocals)
- 2018: A Life in Yes: The Chris Squire Tribute – Steve Hogarth & Larry Fast (vocals on "Hold Out Your Hand")
- 2018: Gleb Kolyadin – Gleb Kolyadin (vocals and writing credits on "Confluence" and "The Best of Days")
- 2019: Reimagines the Eighties – Trevor Horn featuring the Sarm Orchestra and Steve Hogarth (vocals on "It's Different for Girls")

== Bibliography ==
- Anne-Aurore Inquimbert, Marillion. L'ère Hogarth', Camion Blanc (France), 2014, 222 p.
