= Fish discography =

- Studio albums: 11
- EPs: 1
- Live albums: 20
- Compilation albums: 4
- Singles: 22
- Video albums: 11

This is the solo discography of Scottish singer-songwriter Fish.

== Albums ==
=== Studio albums ===
Title	Album details	Peak chart positions						
Title	Album details	UK	UK Indie	GER	NL	NOR	SWE	SWI
Vigil in a Wilderness of Mirrors	Released: 29 January 1990; Label: EMI; Formats: CD, LP, MC	5	—	6	20	9	14	6
Internal Exile	Released: 28 October 1991; Label: Polydor; Formats: CD, LP, MC	21	—	36	28	—	46	31
Songs from the Mirror	Released: 18 January 1993; Label: Polydor; Formats: CD, LP, MC	46	—	44	16	—	—	30
Suits	Released: 16 May 1994; Label: Dick Bros; Formats: CD, 2xLP, MC	20	1	84	22	—	—	—
Sunsets on Empire	Released: 19 May 1997; Label: Dick Bros; Formats: CD, 2xCD, MC	42	9	73	44	—	—	—
Raingods with Zippos	Released: 19 April 1999; Label: Roadrunner; Formats: CD, MC	57	—	34	35	—	—	—
Fellini Days	Released: 2 May 2001; Label: Chocolate Frog; Formats: CD, 2xCD, LP	—	—	64	—	—	—	—
Field of Crows	Released: 10 December 2003; Label: Chocolate Frog; Formats: CD	—	—	72	—	—	—	—
13th Star	Released: 6 September 2007; Label: Chocolate Frog; Formats: CD, 2xLP	—	33	—	94	—	—	—
A Feast of Consequences	Released: 4 September 2013; Label: Chocolate Frog; Formats: CD, MC, digital download	—	—	—	—	—	—	—
Weltschmerz	Released: 25 September 2020; Label: Chocolate Frog; Formats: 2xCD, 2xLP, Blu-Ray, digital download	—	39	—	—	—	—	—
—	—	—	—	—	—	—		
"—" denotes releases that did not chart or were not released in that territory.

=== Live albums ===
Title	Album details	Peak chart positions	
Title	Album details	UK	NL
Toiling in the Reeperbahn	Released: June 1993; Label: Battleside; Formats: 2xCD; Recorded on 23 June 1992 at the Hamburg Große Freiheit	—	—
Pigpens Birthday	Released: June 1993; Label: Battleside; Formats: 2xCD; Recorded on 2 April 1990 at the Hammersmith Odeon	—	—
Derek Dick & His Amazing Electric Bear	Released: June 1993; Label: Battleside; Formats: 2xCD; Recorded on 3 November 1991 at the Haddington Corn Exchange	—	—
Uncle Fish & the Crypt Creepers	Released: June 1993; Label: Battleside; Formats: 2xCD; Recorded on 7 December 1991 at the Düsseldorf Philips Halle	—	—
For Whom the Bells Toll!	Released: June 1993; Label: Battleside; Formats: 2xCD; Recorded on 31 December 1991 at the Edinburgh Playhouse	—	—
Sushi	Released: 21 March 1994; Label: Dick Bros; Formats: 2xCD, 2xMC; Recorded on 18 March 1993 at the Utrecht Vredenburg Hall	—	63
Acoustic Session	Released: February 1994; Label: Dick Bros; Formats: CD; Recorded in 1994 at the Furry Farm, East Lothian	—	—
Krakow	Released: August 1996; Label: Dick Bros; Formats: 2xCD; Recorded on 11 October 1995 at Kraków P1 Studios	—	—
Tales from the Big Bus	Released: July 1998; Label: Dick Bros; Formats: 2xCD; Recorded on 20 November 1997 in Cologne	—	—
The Complete BBC Sessions	Released: June 1999; Label: Blueprint/BBC Music; Formats: 2xCD; Recorded on 11 November 1989 at the London Town and Country Club and on 15 November 1991 at the Nottingham Royal Concert Hall	—	—
Sashimi	Released: 3 May 2001; Label: Chocolate Frog; Formats: 2xCD; Recorded on 3 October 1999 at the Zamek Centre of Culture, Poznań	—	—
Fellini Nights	Released: 29 March 2002; Label: Chocolate Frog; Formats: 2xCD; Recorded on 11 May 2001 at Paradiso	—	—
Return to Childhood	Released: 24 April 2006; Label: Snapper Music; Formats: 2xCD; Recorded on 13 November 2005 at the Tilburg 013 and on 18 November 2005 at the Cologne E-Werk	185	—
Communion	Released: 1 October 2007; Label: Chocolate Frog; Formats: 2xCD; Recorded on 27 August 2006 at St Mary's Collegiate Church, Haddington	—	—
Fishheads Club Live	Released: October 2012; Label: Chocolate Frog; Formats: digital download; Recorded on 13 December 2010 at the University of Derby and on 10/11 March 2012 at the Spittalrig Studio	—	—
Gone Fishing	Released: 13 May 2013; Label: Chocolate Frog; Formats: 2xCD+DVD, digital download; Recorded on 21 October 2012 at the Leamington Spa Convention	—	—
The Moveable Feast	Released: 5 December 2016; Label: Chocolate Frog; Formats: 4xCD, digital download; Recorded on 25 October 2013 at Substage, Karlsruhe and on 29 October 2014 at Posthalle, Würzburg	—	—
Farewell to Childhood	Released: 5 April 2017; Label: Chocolate Frog; Formats: 2xCD+DVD, digital download; Recorded in November 2015 in Europe	—	—
A Fish in the Lemon Tree	Released: 4 December 2020; Label: Chocolate Frog; Formats: digital download; Recorded on 13 March 2020 at the Lemon Tree, Aberdeen	—	—
The Last Straw	Released: 4 February 2022; Label: Chocolate Frog; Formats: 2xCD+DVD, digital download; Recorded on 13 December 2018 at the O2 Academy Glasgow	—	7
Vigil's End UK Tour 2021	Released: 2022; Label: Chocolate Frog; Formats: 2xCD +DVD; digital download; CDs recorded at Assembly Halls, Leamington Spa on 24 November 2021; DVD contains video of the Leamington Spa show, plus audio of 'Fish in the Lemon Tree' and a combination recording as an alternate setlist from the tour.	-	
"—" denotes releases that did not chart or were not released in that territory.

=== Compilation albums ===
Title	Album details	Peak chart positions		
Title	Album details	UK	UK Indie	NL
Yin	Released: 28 August 1995; Label: Dick Bros; Formats: CD, MC	58	9	68
Yang	Released: 28 August 1995; Label: Dick Bros; Formats: CD, MC	52	8	73
Kettle of Fish (88–98)	Released: 9 November 1998; Label: Roadrunner; Formats: CD	—	—	—
Bouillabaisse – The Best of Fish	Released: 26 September 2005; Label: Snapper Music; Formats: 2xCD	—	—	—
"—" denotes releases that did not chart or were not released in that territory.

=== Video albums ===
Title	Album details
Songs for the Company	Released: 1994; Label: The Company Germany; Formats: VHS
Live in Concert Krakow – Electric Set	Released: August 1996; Label: Dick Bros; Formats: VHS
Live in Concert Krakow – Acoustic Set	Released: August 1996; Label: Dick Bros; Formats: VHS
10 Years Solo Anniversary – Duisburg	Released: August 1998; Label: The Company Germany; Formats: VHS
Kettle of Fish – Video Collection	Released: November 1998; Label: Dick Bros; Formats: VHS
Sunsets on Empire	Released: 1999; Label: The Company; Formats: VHS
Fool's Company – Live in Holland 2002	Released: April 2003; Label: Chocolate Frog Video; Formats: 2xDVD
Scattering Crows – Live in Europe 2004	Released: April 2005; Label: Chocolate Frog Video; Formats: DVD
Return to Childhood	Released: April 2006; Label: Snapper Music; Formats: DVD
In Search of the 13th Star	Released: 2009; Label: Chocolate Frog Video; Formats: DVD
Fishheads Club Live	Released: October 2012; Label: Chocolate Frog Films; Formats: DVD

== EPs ==
Title	EP details	Peak chart positions
Title	EP details	UK DL
A Parley with Angels	Released: 21 September 2018; Label: Chocolate Frog; Formats: CD, digital download	85

== Singles ==
Title	Year	Peak chart positions					Album
Title	Year	UK	UK Indie	IRE	NL	SWI	Album
"Shortcut to Somewhere" (with Tony Banks)	1986	75	—	—	—	—	Soundtracks (by Banks)
"State of Mind"	1989	32	—	30	—	—	Vigil in a Wilderness of Mirrors
"Big Wedge"	1989	25	—	23	—	27	Vigil in a Wilderness of Mirrors
"A Gentleman's Excuse Me"	1990	30	—	—	26	—	Vigil in a Wilderness of Mirrors
"The Company" (Continental Europe-only release)	1990	—	—	—	59	—	Vigil in a Wilderness of Mirrors
"Internal Exile"	1991	37	—	—	59	30	Internal Exile
"Credo"	1991	38	—	—	—	—	Internal Exile
"Something in the Air"	1992	51	—	—	—	—	Internal Exile
"Hold Your Head Up" (Note: This single was released with the title 'Never Mind the Bullocks'.)	1992	80	—	—	—	—	Songs from the Mirror
"Lady Let It Lie"	1994	46	5	—	—	—	Suits
"Fortunes of War"	1994	67	9	—	—	—	Suits
"Just Good Friends" (featuring Sam Brown)	1995	63	10	—	—	—	Yin
"Brother 52"	1997	91	17	—	55	—	Sunsets on Empire
"Change of Heart"	1997	162	—	—	—	—	Sunsets on Empire
"Incomplete" (with Elisabeth Antwi)	1999	86	—	—	93	—	Raingods with Zippos
"Arc of the Curve"	2008	—	20	—	—	—	13th Star
"Zoe 25"	2008	—	26	—	—	—	13th Star
"Blind to the Beautiful"	2014	—	36	—	—	—	A Feast of Consequences
"Man with a Stick"	2018	—	—	—	—	—	Weltschmerz
"Weltschmerz"	2020	—	—	—	—	—	Weltschmerz
"Garden of Remembrance"	2020	—	—	—	—	—	Weltschmerz
"This Party's Over"	2020	—	—	—	—	—	Weltschmerz
"—" denotes releases that did not chart or were not released in that territory.

== Guest appearances ==
- 1992: Jeff Wayne - Jeff Wayne's Musical Version of Spartacus (as Crixus)
- 1998: Ayreon - Into the Electric Castle (as the Highlander)
- 2020: Ayreon - Electric Castle Live and Other Tales (as the Highlander)
