= Bouillabaisse (album) =

Bouillabaisse: The Best of Fish
- Cover art by Mark Wilkinson

Greatest hits album by Fish
- Released: 25 September-10 October 2005
- Recorded: 1982–2003
- Genre: Neo-prog
- Length: 143:47
- Label: Chocolate Frog Records
- Producer: Chris Kimsey; Jon Kelly; James Cassidy; Steven Wilson; Elliot Ness; Calum Malcolm

Fish chronology
Field of Crows (2004)	Bouillabaisse: The Best of Fish (2005)	13th Star (2007)

Bouillabaisse is a compilation double album by Fish released in 2005. It is the third "best-of" collection after Yin and Yang (1995) and Kettle of Fish (1998), however, it covers Fish's entire solo career up to the previous year's studio album Field of Crows. The songs are divided into two sets: Disc 1, entitled "Balladeer", and disc 2, entitled "Rocketeer". It also features the single edits Marillion's three biggest hits, "Kayleigh", "Lavender" (1985) and "Incommunicado" (1987). (Unlike on Yin and Yang, these are the original versions rather than re-recordings.) It also features an edited version of "Goldfish and Clowns" from Sunsets on Empire (1997) which has never been released due to the planned single being ultimately cancelled.

The only "new" track is Fish's version of the Scottish folk song "Caledonia", which had first been released on a 2002 tribute album to Frankie Miller, who had a Scottish number one with his own version in 1992.

In total, the two discs contain 26 tracks (or 31, if the parts of the "Plague of Ghosts" suite are counted individually) with a total time of 143 minutes.

Although not credited, the cover is a digitally edited design by Mark Wilkinson. It shows Fish sitting over a bowl of soup (presumably Bouillabaisse) in a restaurant whose walls are decorated with posters of Fish's previous album covers (an idea strikingly similar to Marillion's European 2002 release, The Best of Marillion.)

The album marked the beginning of Fish's cooperation with the Snapper Music label, which took over the retail distribution of Fish's backcatalogue released on his own imprint Chocolate Frog Record Company. (Similarly, the previous best-of Kettle of Fish had been the first release on his short-lived connection with Roadrunner Records.)

== Track listing ==
=== Disc One: Balladeer ===
1. "Just Good Friends" (Dick/Usher/Boult/Simmonds) – 4:02
  - Features Sam Brown. From Yin, 1995.
2. "Shot the Craw" (Dick/Watson/Duguid) – 3:59
  - From Field of Crows, 2004.
3. "A Gentleman's Excuse Me" (Dick/Simmonds) – 4:16
  - From Vigil in a Wilderness of Mirrors, 1989
4. "Kayleigh" (Dick/Rothery/Kelly/Trewavas/Mosley) – 3:36
  - From Marillion's Misplaced Childhood, 1985.
5. "Solo" (Sandy Denny) – 4:11
  - From Songs from the Mirror, 1993.
6. "Incomplete" (Dick/Antwi/Millett) – 3:44
  - Features Elizabeth Troy Antwi. From Raingods with Zippos, 1999.
7. "The Company" (Dick/Simmonds) – 4:04
  - From Vigil in a Wilderness of Mirrors, 1989.
8. "Fortunes of War" (Dick/Cassidy/Boult) – 5:06
  - From Suits, 1994.
9. "Our Smile" (Dick/Wesley/Young) – 4:15
  - From Fellini Days, 2001.
10. "Lavender" (Dick/Rothery/Kelly/Trewavas/Mosley) – 3:43
  - From Marillion's Misplaced Childhood, 1985.
11. "Lady Let It Lie" (Dick/Paton/Cassidy) – 4:09
  - From Suits, 1994.
12. "Cliché" (Dick/Simmonds/Lindes) – 7:05
  - From Vigil in a Wilderness of Mirrors, 1989.
13. "Scattering Crows" (Dick/Watson/Turrell/Duguid) – 5:08
  - From Field of Crows, 2004.
14. "Tara" (Dick/Paterson) – 4:03
  - From Sunsets on Empire, 1997.
15. "Caledonia" (MacLean) – 4:21
  - From A Tribute to Frankie Miller, 2002.
16. "Raw Meat" (Dick/Paterson) – 5:15
  - From Suits, 1994.

=== Disc Two: Rocketeer ===
1. "Big Wedge" (Dick/Simmonds) – 4:37
  - From Vigil in a Wilderness of Mirrors, 1989.
2. "Credo" (Dick/Simmonds/Boult/Usher) – 4:03
  - From Internal Exile, 1991.
3. "Incommunicado" (Dick/Rothery/Trewavas/Kelly/Mosley) – 3:56
  - From Marillion's Clutching at Straws, 1987.
4. "Goldfish and Clowns" (Dick/Wilson) – 4:11
  - From Sunsets on Empire, 1997.
5. "Long Cold Day" (Dick/Wesley/Young) – 5:33
  - From Fellini Days, 2001.
6. "Brother 52" (Dick/Wilson) – 3:57
  - From Sunsets on Empire, 1997.
7. "Clock Moves Sideways" (Dick/Wesley) – 7:02
  - From Fellini Days, 2001.
8. "The Perception of Johnny Punter" (Dick/Wilson) – 8:39
  - From Sunsets on Empire, 1997.
9. "Moving Targets" (Dick/Watson/Duguid) – 5:45
  - From Field of Crows, 2004.
10. "Plague of Ghosts" (Dick/Turrell/Doghorn)
  - From Raingods with Zippos, 1999.
  1. "Old Haunts" – 3:14
  2. "Digging Deep" – 6:48
  3. "Chocolate Frogs" – 4:04
  4. "Waving at Stars" – 3:12
  5. "Raingods Dancing" – 4:16
  6. "Wake Up Call (Make It Happen)" – 3:32
