= 13th Star =

- Cover art by Mark Wilkinson

Studio album by Fish
- Released: 6 September 2007
- Genre: Progressive rock
- Length: 55:30
- Label: Chocolate Frog Records
- Producer: Calum Malcolm

Fish chronology
Bouillabaisse (2005)	13th Star (2007)	A Feast of Consequences (2013)

Singles from 13th Star
- 1. "Arc of the Curve" Released: 3 March 2008; 2. "Zoe 25" Released: 6 October 2008

Professional ratings
Review scores
Source	Rating
AllMusic	3.5/5 stars
Scotland on Sunday	4/5 stars

13th Star is the ninth solo studio album (eighth of original material) by Fish since he left Marillion in 1988. Released as a limited edition via mail-order in September 2007 and to retail in February 2008, it is his first since Field of Crows (2004). Released on Fish's own imprint Chocolate Frog Records, retail distribution is handled by Snapper Music.

== Music and lyrics ==
Steve Vantsis, who was Fish's permanent bassist from the Sunsets on Empire tour (1997) until 2008, was the main writing partner on this album (a role previously held by, among others, Mickey Simmonds, Steven Wilson, John Wesley and Bruce Watson). It features a rougher, more guitar-based and slightly industrial sound on a number of tracks and is therefore perceived as a departure by many fans. However, Fish had explored similar ideas as early as on Sunsets on Empire and Raingods with Zippos (1999). Also, a number of tracks have classic Fish hallmarks, significantly enhanced by the presence of his longtime companion Frank Usher on guitars.

Most lyrics deal with, or are at least implicitly in reference to, Fish's failed relationship with Mostly Autumn singer Heather Findlay who left him in 2007, cancelling their scheduled wedding. The title 13th Star originally referred to her as being the 13th female significant other in Fish's life, but ended up as a metaphor for an (unknown) future relationship. The original title of the song "Zoë 25" was "Micklegate", after the place where Fish had proposed to Heather. The title also refers to the album as the 13th studio album of his career (four with Marillion and nine solo).

== Musicians ==
Steve Vantsis, previously strictly the bassist, emerges as the dominant musician on the album. Apart from most of the songwriting, he is also responsible for electric and acoustic guitars and keyboards. The main guitarist is once again Frank Usher, who also co-wrote one song ("Openwater"). Keyboards are handled by Foss Paterson, returning into the line-up for the first time since 1997 (except for a brief one-off stint on the 2000 tour of Bosnia). He also co-wrote the only other non-Vantsis song on the album, the piano ballad "Miles de Besos". Further guitar credits go to Chris Johnson (of The Evernauts and Mostly Autumn), who is also the second guitarist on the tour. Another Mostly Autumn connection is former Karnataka drummer Gavin Griffiths, who played with them for most of 2007. Dave Haswell, who had already contributed to Fish's previous three studio albums, plays additional percussion. Female backing vocals are by Lorna Bannon, who had appeared on Songs from the Mirror, Suits and Sunsets on Empire.

The album was produced by Calum Malcolm, who had mixed and/or (re)mastered several Fish albums before.

== Cover art ==
The cover was designed by Fish's long-time collaborator, artist Mark Wilkinson. Although Wilkinson had designed all official album releases by Fish (with the exception of Songs from The Mirror), the more recent ones had largely been computer-aided ones, while the cover of the previous album Field of Crows emulated Vincent van Gogh's style. By contrast, the artwork for 13th Star, spreading across three sides a fold-out digipak and the booklet, marked a return to Wilkinson's hallmark airbrush style that had been a characteristic feature of the Fish-era Marillion gatefold covers as well as Fish's first solo album Vigil in a Wilderness of Mirrors (1990). A vinyl version of the album was released in a gatefold cover whose large format is better suited to the scope of Wilkinson's painting. The image of the "Dark Angel" navigating his boat from the booklet's front cover illustrates the style and atmosphere of the artwork for this album.

== Formats ==
- The limited version (10,000 copies) that was made available by mail order only on 6 September 2007 was a digipak with three panels which contained a bonus "making-of" DVD and a 20-page colour booklet. The digipak is in a "spot-varnished" closed slipcase with the Fish logo over the Egyptian "star" design. The slipcase is usually shown as the cover in reviews and catalogues.
- The retail version available from 12 February 2008 was a standard jewel case CD provided in a slipcase open on two sides.
- In May 2008, a limited edition (2,500 copies) double vinyl gatefold album was released as a mail order only release. It has the regular CD tracks spread across the first three of four sides, while the fourth side contains live versions of "Circle Line", "Dark Star" and "13th Star".
- Download versions of the album are available from Fish's website and iTunes.
- In 2023, a deluxe edition of 13th Star was released on Chocolate Frog Records as a 3CD/Blu-ray set along with a 3LP boxed version. The deluxe edition includes a new remix and remaster by Calum Malcolm, as well as, on the Blu-ray disc, new Dolby ATMOS and 5.1 surround by mixed by Avril Mackintosh and Andy Bradfield, documentaries and a full concert video. The compact discs include album demos and live material recorded at various venues.

== Singles ==
The track "Arc of the Curve" is released as a single on 3 March 2008. The CD version contains only two tracks (the album version and an edited version of the title track), however, a download version including three live tracks is available from iTunes. On 6 October 2008, "Zoe 25" was released as the second single along with two live tracks (download and CD version).

== Tour ==
Fish first presented the album on the European Clutching at Stars tour which began in the summer of 2007. In addition to focusing on the 13th Star material, the tour celebrated the 20th anniversary of Clutching at Straws (Fish's last album with Marillion), and so most of the set list was drawn from these two releases. This tour covered the spring and summer of 2008, with Fish giving a meet-and-greet for some fans before each show.

== Track listing ==
All songs written by Derek Dick and Steve Vantsis, except where noted.

No.	Title	Length
1.	"Circle Line"	6:04
2.	"Square Go"	5:31
3.	"Miles de Besos" (Dick, Foss Patterson)	4:22
4.	"Zoë 25"	5:19
5.	"Arc of the Curve"	4:29
6.	"Manchmal"	5:42
7.	"Openwater" (Dick, Frank Usher)	5:07
8.	"Dark Star"	6:48
9.	"Where in the World"	6:05
10.	"13th Star"	5:41

=== 3-CD + Blu-ray Disc, 2023, Remastered/Remixed, Digi-Book ===
Disc 1: 2023 Remix by Calum Malcolm
No.	Title	Length
1.	"Circle Line"	6:04
2.	"Square Go"	5:31
3.	"Miles de Besos"	4:22
4.	"Zoë 25"	5:19
5.	"Arc of the Curve"	4:29
6.	"Manchmal"	5:42
7.	"Openwater"	5:07
8.	"Dark Star"	6:48
9.	"Where in the World"	6:05
10.	"13th Star"	5:41

Disc 2: Demos & Acoustic
No.	Title	Length
1.	"Arc Of The Curve (Bob Harris BBC Radio2 Session)"	4:52
2.	"Zoe 25 (Bob Harris BBC Radio2 Session)"	5:12
3.	"13th Star (Bob Harris BBC Radio2 Session)"	5:10
4.	"Miles De Besos (Demo with Guide Vocal May 2007)"	4:31
5.	"Zoe 25 (St Marys Church, Acoustic 2010)"	5:46
6.	"13th Star (Demo with Guide Vocal May 2007)"	6:07
7.	"Arc Of The Curve (Demo Instrumental March 2007)"	5:15
8.	"Circle Line (Demo with Rough Vocal April 2007)"	6:11
9.	"Dark Star (Demo Instrumental April 2007)"	6:11
10.	"It Ain't Easy (Early Demo Instrumental March 2007)"	5:58
11.	"Manchmal (Demo with Guide Vocal April 2007)"	5:28
12.	"Zoe 25 (Micklegate Demo with Vocal)"	4:39
13.	"Square Go (Demo with Vocal April 2007)"	5:26

Disc 3: Live Recordings
No.	Title	Track source	Length
1.	"Manchmal"	In Search Of The 13th Star - Fish Live In The USA	5:46
2.	"Zoe 25"	In Search Of The 13th Star - Fish Live In The USA	5:15
3.	"Arc Of The Curve"	In Search Of The 13th Star - Fish Live In The USA	4:58
4.	"Dark Star"	In Search Of The 13th Star - Fish Live In The USA	7:00
5.	"Circle Line"	In Search Of The 13th Star - Fish Live In The USA	6:36
6.	"Square Go"	In Search Of The 13th Star - Fish Live In The USA	5:11
7.	"Open Water"	In Search Of The 13th Star - Fish Live In The USA	5:24
8.	"13th Star"	Amsterdam Paradiso 22/03/08	6:08
9.	"Dark Star"	Amsterdam Paradiso 22/03/08	6:52
10.	"Circle Line"	Rome Staziona Birra 30/11/07	6:27
11.	"Square Go"	Rome Staziona Birra 30/11/07	5:09
12.	"Manchmal"	Rome Staziona Birra 30/11/07	5:42

Blu-ray Disc
Audio

1. 13th Star Dolby Atmos mix
2. 13th Star Dolby 5.1 mix
3. 13th Star original 2008 stereo mix

Video

4. Fish At NearFest, USA 2008 Full Concert Video
5. 13th Star Documentary 'The Search For The 13th Star' featuring new interviews with Fish, Steve Vantsis, and Mark Wilkinson
6. Original 2007 'Making Of' Documentary

== Personnel ==
- Fish (Derek W. Dick) – All Vocals / Lyrics
- Frank Usher – Electric Guitars; Acoustic Guitars (Tracks 3-5,9,10); Loop Guitar (1); Lap Steel (5)
- Steve Vantsis – Bass Guitars; Electric Guitars (2,4,6,7 and 8); Acoustic Guitars (1,4,10); Keyboards (1,2,4,6,8-10); Upright Bass (3); Clavinet (2); Drum Loop and Programming; Samples
- Chris Johnson – Electric Guitars; Acoustic Guitars (4,5 and 9)
- Foss Patterson – Piano (1,3-5); Keyboards (1-4,6-9); Organ (1-4,6-10); Strings (1-5,8-10); Music Box (4); Dulcimer; Accordion; Samples (10)
- Gavin Griffiths – Drums
- Dave Haswell – Percussion (1,3-5 and 10)
- Lorna Bannon – Backing Vocals (3-6,9,10)
