= Kettle of Fish =

- Cover art by Mark Wilkinson

Compilation album by Fish
- Released: 9 November 1998
- Genre: Progressive rock
- Length: 70:51
- Label: Roadrunner
- Producers: Jon Kelly, Chris Kimsey, James Cassidy, Steven Wilson, Elliot Ness

Fish chronology
Sunsets on Empire (1997)	Kettle of Fish (1998)	Raingods with Zippos (1999)

Kettle of Fish (88-98) is the title of a compilation album by Fish released in 1998, providing a retrospective on his solo career plus two new songs. Unlike the previous best-of Yin and Yang (1995), this is a single disc and does not include any Marillion material. Kettle of Fish was Fish's first release under a new contract with Roadrunner Records, who signed Fish after the financially catastrophic Sunsets on Empire album and tour of 1997 had forced him to dissolve his own label Dick Brothers Record Company. (The Dick Bros. logo still appears on the back, but this appears to be strictly symbolic.) Roadrunner also re-released Fish's entire backcatalogue; Kettle of Fish was intended to draw attention to these titles, which explains the publication of another "best-of" compilation with just one studio album between this and the last one. The album was accompanied by an eponymous collection of video clips with slightly different tracks (see below). In Europe, the limited first edition of the album included a bonus CD-ROM with three videos and additional material.

== Tracks ==
The album contains thirteen tracks, most of which have been singles, in non-chronological order. There are three songs each from the first two solo albums, Vigil in a Wilderness of Mirrors (1990) and Internal Exile (1991); "Just Good Friends" from Internal Exile appears in its 1995 re-recorded version featuring Sam Brown. The other two solo albums – Suits (1994) and Sunsets on Empire (1997) - are represented by two songs each. The 1993 studio album with cover versions, Songs from the Mirror, is not represented. Also not included are the singles "The Company" (1990) and "Change of Heart" (1997), which had only been released in Germany and the UK, respectively. Instead, two songs that were planned as singles but never released, are included – "Lucky" (1991) and "Goldfish and Clowns" (1997). All tracks appear in their original album versions, except for "Goldfish and Clowns" and "Lady Let It Lie", of which the single edits are used. Additionally, the album contains two new tracks. Both are products of Fish's participation in a songwriters retreat organised by Miles Copeland III at his castle Marouatte in France (incidentally the same place where Marillion had recorded Brave) in the spring of 1998. "Mr. Buttons" was co-written with Maia Sharp and Andy Gardiner; "Chasing Miss Pretty", a pure pop song, with Chris Braide and American guitarist Dave Bassett. (Another three songs from these sessions would end up on the forthcoming album Raingods with Zippos.) "Chasing Miss Pretty" was planned as a single, but never materialised.

== Cover art ==
The cover is, by Fish's standards, simplistic; it shows a goldfish in an undersized, kettle-shaped aquarium on a black background. The illustration was created by web designer Mo Warden, who also runs his official site. Regular Fish album designer Mark Wilkinson is credited for "sleeve design", although it is not clear what for; it could be in reference to the thumbnail-sized covers of the singles that are included in the lyrics booklet.

== Video version ==
In December 1998, a video compilation with the same title was released, which has a different running order and a different selection of eleven tracks. It contains the promotional videos for ten Fish singles released to that point. Again, the singles "The Company" and "Change of Heart", for which no videos were made, are missing, as are the four new/non-single tracks found the album version. Instead, there are videos for two songs not on the album: Fish's version of the 1972 Argent hit "Hold Your Head Up", which had been the A-side of the only single from the 1993 cover album Songs from the Mirror. The second non-album video is of Tony Banks's single "Shortcut to Somewhere" (1986) from his album Soundtracks, which featured Fish on lead vocals. This had been Fish's first ever recording outside Marillion.

== Track listing ==
CD
No.	Title	Writer(s)	Original release	Length
1.	"Big Wedge"	Derek Dick/Mickey Simmonds	Vigil in a Wilderness of Mirrors	5:19
2.	"Just Good Friends" (With Sam Brown)	Boult/Dick/Simmonds/Frank Usher	Yin	5:48
3.	"Brother 52"	Dick/Steven Wilson	Sunsets on Empire	6:06
4.	"Chasing Miss Pretty"	Bassett/Chris Braide/Dick	New track	4:53
5.	"Credo"	Boult/Dick/Simmonds/Usher	Internal Exile	6:41
6.	"A Gentleman's Excuse Me"	Dick/Simmonds	Vigil in a Wilderness of Mirrors	4:19
7.	"Goldfish and Clowns"	Dick/Wilson	Sunsets on Empire	6:38
8.	"Lady Let It Lie (Edited version)"	Cassidy/Dick/David Paton	Suits	4:12
9.	"Lucky (1995 Re-recording)"	Boult/Dick/Simmonds	Yang	4:58
10.	"State Of Mind"	Dick/Hal Lindes/Simmonds	Vigil in a Wilderness of Mirrors	4:46
11.	"Mr. Buttons"	Dick/Gardiner/Sharp	New track	4:36
12.	"Fortunes Of War"	Boult/Cassidy/Dick	Suits	7:54
13.	"Internal Exile"	Boult/Dick/Simmonds	Internal Exile	4:41

=== DVD ===
Albums and credits as above except where noted.

1. "State Of Mind" - directed by Michael Geoghegan
2. "Big Wedge" - directed by Michael Geoghegan
3. "A Gentleman's Excuse Me" - directed by Julian Doyle 1990
4. "Internal Exile" - directed by Brian Ward, produced by Iain Brown 1991
5. "Credo" - directed by Tony Van Den Ende, produced by Kathy Hood 1991
6. "Hold Your Head Up" (Argent/White), from Songs from the Mirror (1992/1993) - directed by David Barnard, produced by Perry Asincomo 1992
7. "Lady Let It Lie" - directed by Dave Miller, produced by Ed Booth 1994
8. "Fortunes Of War" - directed by Hamish Barbour, produced by Ed Booth 1994
9. "Just Good Friends" (with Sam Brown) - directed by Hamish Barbour 1995
10. "Brother 52" - directed by Steve Flack 1997, produced by Jane Rigby and Jim Leishman, with the co-operation of the students of Dundee University's Duncan of Jordanstone College of Art and Design
11. "Shortcut to Somewhere" (with Tony Banks) (Dick, Banks), from the soundtrack of Quicksilver, featured on the Tony Banks album Soundtracks

The videos for "Fortunes of War", "Brother 52" and "Just Good Friends" were also on a CD-ROM included with the first 30,000 copies of the audio version.
