= State of Mind (Fish song) =

Single by Fish

from the album Vigil in a Wilderness of Mirrors
- B-side: "The Voyeur (I Like to Watch)"
- Released: 16 October 1989 (UK)
- Recorded: Townhouse Studios, 1989
- Genre: Progressive rock, neo-prog, pop rock, folk rock
- Length: 4:12 (edited version), 05:48 ("Presidential Mix"), 04:42 (B-side)
- Label: EMI
- Songwriters: Dick, Mickey Simmonds, Hal Lindes
- Producer: Jon Kelly

Fish singles chronology
"Shortcut to Somewhere" (1986)	"State of Mind" (1989)	"Big Wedge" (1989)

"State of Mind" is the debut solo single by Scottish singer Fish. It was released in October 1989, about a year after his departure from Marillion and preceding the release of his first solo album Vigil in a Wilderness of Mirrors. It is also the first-ever record Fish did outside Marillion except for his 1986 collaboration with Tony Banks on the single "Shortcut to Somewhere" from Banks' album Soundtracks.

"State of Mind"
Sample of "State of Mind"

== Song information ==
"State of Mind" is a slow to mid-tempo rock song with strong bass and percussion elements and some Celtic folk elements. Lyrically, it is a protest song that articulates the general political discontent in the late Thatcher years. In terms of music, lyrics and general mood, it is perhaps closest to the Marillion song "Sugar Mice" (1987). The B-side "The Voyeur (I Like to Watch)" is a harder, although mainly keyboard-based rock song, somewhat similar to Peter Gabriel's "Shock the Monkey"; and "Intruder", the lyrics criticise "TV voyeurism". "The Voyeur" was also included as a bonus track on the CD version of Vigil in a Wilderness of Mirrors. Fish co-wrote both tracks with keyboardist Mickey Simmonds, the dominant musical composer on his debut solo album. Guitarist Hal Lindes has additional credits on "State of Mind". Drums were played by John Keeble, best known for his membership of 1980s new wave band Spandau Ballet.

== Cover art ==
The cover was designed by Mark Wilkinson, who had created all of Marillion's artwork until Fish's departure, and has continued to work with Fish since then. The cover shows close-ups of the faces of the couple that also features on the cover of Vigil in a Wilderness of Mirrors with an hourglass between them. The back-cover features an illustration of an atomic explosion inside the hourglass. The single was also the first to feature the circular "Fish" logo designed by Wilkinson, which has been used on all solo releases since then (except for the 1997 album Sunsets on Empire and the singles from it.)

== Critical reception ==
Pan-European magazine Music & Media called this track "captivating, ethereal tune" and draw an analogy between it and "Kayleigh."

== Track listings ==
7" single, cassette single

1. "State of Mind" (Edited Version) (Dick/Simmonds/Lindes) – 04:12
2. "The Voyeur (I Like to Watch)" (Dick/Simmonds) – 04:42

12" single, 12" picture disc
Side 1: "State of Mind (Presidential Mix)" (Dick/Simmonds/Lindes) – 05:48
Side 2: 1. "State of Mind" (edited version) (Dick/Simmonds/Lindes) – 04:12

2. "The Voyeur (I Like to Watch)" (Dick/Simmonds) – 04:42

5" CD single, 3" CD single

1. "State of Mind" (album version) (Dick/Simmonds/Lindes) – 04:45
2. "The Voyeur (I Like to Watch)" (Dick/Simmonds) – 04:42
3. "State of Mind (Presidential Mix)" (Dick/Simmonds/Lindes) – 05:48

Total running time: 15:19

== Chart positions ==
"State of Mind" was the first of five UK top 40 singles by Fish. On 28 October 1989, it entered the UK singles charts at position 32, which would remain its highest position. The following week, it dropped to 36; in the third and final week, it was at 58. In terms of peak chart position, this was Fish's third most successful single.

== Personnel ==
- Fish (Derek W. Dick) - Vocals
- Frank Usher - Guitars
- Hal Lindes - Guitars ("State of Mind" only)
- John Giblin - Bass Guitars
- Mickey Simmonds - Keyboards
- John Keeble - Drums
- Luís Jardim - Percussion ("State of Mind" only)
- Carol Kenyon - Backing Vocals ("State of Mind" only)
