= Irvin Duguid =

Scottish musician and composer

Irvin Duguid (born 18 December 1969, in Aberchirder, Aberdeenshire) is a Scottish musician and composer.

He studied piano and violin at the Royal Scottish Academy of Music and Drama in Glasgow before going on to become keyboard player in the live line-up of Stiltskin, a rock band with the number 1 hit single "Inside" in the UK in 1994.

Duguid went on to work with other Scottish acts such as Gun (later to change their name to g.u.n. in the wake of the Dunblane massacre) and then Fish (ex-Marillion vocalist). Duguid has since appeared on several albums by Stiltskin's old vocalist Ray Wilson, who for a short time in the late 1990s was lead singer with Genesis.

In 2004 he worked on some demo material with Paolo Nutini and appeared as Paolo's keyboard player at 2 events, a live BBC Radio Scotland session and a gig at King Tut's Wah Wah Hut. In 2006 he began writing songs with singer Louise Rutkowski, 7 years later in 2013 had finished an album of work (Diary of a Lost Girl) which was funded by Pledge Music and finally released in 2014.

2007 saw Duguid producing the double album Duan Nollaig by Fiona Mackenzie. This was released on the Greentrax record label and is believed to be the first such collection of Christmas songs and Carols in the Gaelic language. He also arranged most of the 35 songs and played piano on about half of these. Scots singer Karen Matheson was one of the guest vocalists on the album.

Duguid has appeared as a keyboard player on many UK touring musicals including We Will Rock You, The Producers, The Full Monty and on The Bodyguard in London.

== TV Composer ==
- My Life in Books, Anne Robinson, BBC, 2011
- Quiz show pilot, BBC, 2011

== Discography ==
- Diary of a Lost Girl, Louise Rutkowski. 2014
- The Lassies Reply, Pur. 2009
- Deagh Dheis Aodaich (A Good Suit of Clothes), Fiona Mackenzie. 2009
- Duan Nollaig, Fiona Mackenzie. 2007
- She, Stiltskin. 2006
- Ray Wilson Live, Ray Wilson. 2005
- The River Sessions, Gun. 2005
- Bouillabaisse, Fish. 2005
- The Next Best Thing, Ray Wilson. 2004
- Change, Ray Wilson. 2003
- Field of Crows, Fish. 2003
- Fool's Company (DVD), Fish. 2002
- A Tribute to Frankie Miller, Various Artistes. 2002
- The Mind's Eye (American release), Stiltskin. 1995
