= Chris Kimsey =

English record producer

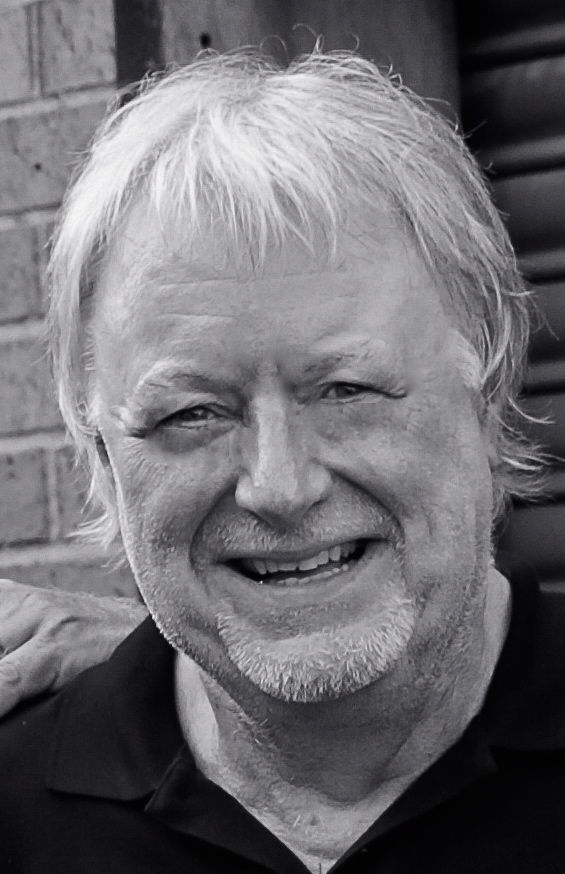
- Born: Christopher Kenneth Kimsey; 3 December 1951 (age 74); Battersea, London, England
- Occupations: Record producer; audio engineer; musician
- Notable credits: The Rolling Stones: Some Girls, Sticky Fingers, Tattoo You; Peter Frampton: Frampton Comes Alive!, Frampton; Led Zeppelin: Led Zeppelin III; Duran Duran: Liberty; Marillion: Misplaced Childhood; Killing Joke: Laugh? I nearly Bought One!

Christopher Kenneth Kimsey (born 3 December 1951) is an English musician, engineer, and record producer, best known for his work with the Rolling Stones.

== Career ==
Born in Battersea, London, England, Kimsey began his career in 1967 at Olympic Studios as a tea boy, before working his way up to assistant engineer. Kimsey engineered albums by The Rolling Stones, Ten Years After, Spooky Tooth, Emerson Lake & Palmer and others. He was the recording engineer and mixing engineer for Peter Frampton's bestselling 1976 double live album Frampton Comes Alive!.

Kimsey's role expanded from engineering to include production responsibilities with Peter Frampton, the Rolling Stones, and others. Having done engineering on the Stones' albums Sticky Fingers (1971) and Some Girls (1978), he assisted Mick Jagger and Keith Richards closely in preparing the Stones' 1981 album Tattoo You, leading to engineering and associate producer credits on the album. His work with the Stones continued as he co-produced Undercover and Steel Wheels.

Kinsey's engineering and production credits include Jimmy Cliff, the Cult, Peter Tosh, JoBoxers, Joan Jett & the Blackhearts, the Psychedelic Furs, Anderson Bruford Wakeman Howe, New Model Army, Anti Nowhere League, INXS, Duran Duran, Golden Earring, Soul Asylum, Diesel Park West, the Chieftains, the Proclaimers, Louis Bertignac, and Ash.

For Bill Wyman's self-titled third album from 1982, Kimsey served as co-producer (with Wyman) and engineer. He also mastered the album with Ted Jensen, mixed it, sang backing vocals and co-wrote the song "Jump Up" with Wyman.

In the 1980s, Kimsey produced Killing Joke and contributed to the band's commercial success with the more melodic and mainstream albums Night Time and Brighter Than a Thousand Suns

Kimsey produced Marillion's 1985 album Misplaced Childhood and its follow-up, Clutching at Straws, and is credited as having contributed backing vocals to "Incommunicado" from that album.

Kimsey is also credited for mixing the performances of Elton John, Paul McCartney and Cliff Richard & the Shadows on the Knebworth double album in 1990.

In 2008, Kimsey was a judge for the 7th annual Independent Music Awards to support independent artists' careers.

In 2014, Kimsey returned to Olympic Studios, where he began his career. He is serving as the sound consultant and engineer for its live concert series and recording facilities.

== Selected work as a producer ==
Served as producer, co-producer or associate producer on the following records (in chronological order):

- Bill Wyman - Monkey Grip (1974)
- Peter Frampton - Frampton (1975)
- Jerry Wiliams - Gone (1975)
- F.B.I. - F.B.I. (1976)
- Strapps - Secret Damage (1976)
- Piper - Can't Wait (1977)
- Peter Frampton - I'm in You (1977)
- The Rolling Stones - Some Girls (1978)
- Carillo - Rings Around the Moon (1978)
- Peter Frampton - Where I Should Be (1979)
- Terry Reid - Rogue Waves (1979)
- The Rolling Stones - Emotional Rescue (1980)
- The Rolling Stones - Tattoo You (1981)
- Doc Holliday - Doc Holliday (1981)
- The Dice - The Dice (1982)
- Bill Wyman - Bill Wyman (1982)
- Jimmy Cliff - Special (1982)
- The Rolling Stones - Undercover (1983)
- Peter Tosh - Mama Africa (1983)
- Joan Jett & the Blackhearts - Glorious Results of a Misspent Youth (1984)
- The Cult - Resurrection Joe (1984)
- Various - Weird Science soundtrack (1985)
- Killing Joke - Night Time (1985)
- Marillion - Misplaced Childhood (1985)
- Killing Joke - Brighter Than a Thousand Suns (1986)
- Cactus World News - Urban Beaches (1986)
- Marillion - Clutching at Straws (1987)
- The Psychedelic Furs - Midnight to Midnight (1987)
- The Escape Club - Wild Wild West (1988)
- Noiseworks - Touch (1988)
- Hurrah! - The Beautiful (1988)
- The Rolling Stones - Steel Wheels (1989)
- Diesel Park West - Shakespeare Alabama (1989)
- Anderson Bruford Wakeman Howe - Anderson Bruford Wakeman Howe (1989)
- Anderson Bruford Wakeman Howe - "Brother of Mine (#1)" (1989)
- Anderson Bruford Wakeman Howe - "Brother of Mine (#2)" (1989)
- Anderson Bruford Wakeman Howe - "Order of the Universe" (1989)
- Anderson Bruford Wakeman Howe - "Quartet (I'm Alive)" (1989)
- Duran Duran - Liberty (1990)
- The Rolling Stones - Flashpoint (1991)
- Maryen Cairns - Pictures Within (1991)
- The Cult - "Resurrection Joe" (1991)
- Fish - Internal Exile (1991)
- Killing Joke - Laugh? I Nearly Bought One! (1992)
- Quireboys - Bitter Sweet and Twisted (1992)
- Colin James - Colin James and the Little Big Band (1993)
- INXS - Full Moon Dirty Hearts (1993)
- Curt Smith - Soul on Board (1993)
- Wendy James - Now Ain't the Time for Your Tears (1993)
- Kinky Machine - Kinky Machine (1993)
- London Symphony Orchestra - Symphonic Music of the Rolling Stones (1994)
- Johnny Hallyday - Rough Town (1994)
- Eat - Epicure (1994)
- Fish - Yin (1995)
- Colin James - Bad Habits (1995)
- The Chieftains - The Long Black Veil (1995)
- JoBoxers - Essential Boxerbeat (1996)
- Louis Bertignac - 96 (1996)
- Gipsy Kings - Compas (1996)
- Johnny Hallyday - Destination Vegas (1996)
- Various - Kingpin soundtrack (1996)
- Soul Asylum - Candy From a Stranger (1998)
- Fish - Kettle of Fish (1998)
- Duran Duran - Greatest (1998)
- Billionaire - Ascension (1999)
- Ash - Wild Surf, Pt. 1 (2000)
- The Proclaimers - Persevere (2001)
- The Law - The Law (2002)
- David Knopfler - Wishbones (2002)
- The Bandits - And They Walked Away (2003)
- Killing Joke - For Beginners (2004)
- David Knopfler - (2004) Ship of Dreams
- Tony Moore - Perfect and Beautiful (2005)
- New Model Army - High (2007)
- Reemer - Snakes and Ladders (2007)
- Peter Frampton - Wind of Change/Frampton's Camel (2008)
- New Model Army - Today Is a Good Day (2008)
- Peter Frampton - Thank You Mr. Churchill (2010)
- MP4 - Cross Party (2010)
- Very Emergency - The Getaway (2010)
- Saint Jude - Diary of a Soul Fiend (2010)
- Peter Frampton - Icon (2011)
- Golden Earring - Tits 'n Ass (2012)
- Nick Capaldi - Shade Of Orange (2012)
- Thirsty - Thirsty (2014)
- Short Stack - Homecoming (2015)
- Maryen Cairns - Femina Australis (2016)
- Peter Perret - How the West Was Won (2017)
- Lil & Ollie - Confession (2018)
- Maryen Cairns - Come to Me (2019)
- S.O.L Collective - Reveries (2019)
- Everett Watson - Politico (2021)
- GHK - Songs On The Hoof] (2021)
- Everett Watson - Equator (2021)
- Kristi Kimsey - As I Look Back (2021)
- Maryen Cairns - Anew (2022)
- Boris Grebenshchikov - House of All Saints (2022)
- Boris Grebenshchikov - The Bardic Songs (2023)
- Boris Grebenshchikov - BOGRUKINOG (2023)

== Selected work as a mix engineer ==
Served as the mix engineer, or assistant-engineer on the following records (in chronological order):

- Led Zeppelin - Led Zeppelin III (1970)
- The Rolling Stones - Sticky Fingers (1971)
- Ten Years After - Watt (1970)
- B.B. Blunder - Workers' Playtime (1971)
- Ten Years After - A Space in Time (1971)
- B.B. King - In London (1971)
- Ten Years After - Rock & Roll Music to the World (1972)
- Howl the Good - Howl the Good (1972)
- Bobby Keys - Bobby Keys (1972)
- Peter Frampton - Wind of Change (1972)
- Peter Frampton - Frampton's Camel (1973)
- Stray Dog - Stray Dog (1973)
- Ten Years After - Recorded Live (1973)
- Spooky Tooth - You Broke My Heart So I Busted Your Jaw (1973)
- Emerson Lake & Palmer - Brain Salad Surgery (1973)
- Bill Wyman - Monkey Grip (1974)
- Johnny Hallyday - Je t'aime, je t'aime, je t'aime (1974)
- Peter Frampton - Somethin's Happening (1974)
- Peter Frampton - Frampton (1974)
- Peter Frampton - Frampton Comes Alive (1976)
- F.B.I. - F.B.I. (1976)
- Automatic Man - Automatic Man (1976)
- Piper - Can't Wait (1977)
- Bad Company - Burnin' Sky (1977)
- Peter Frampton - I'm in You (1977)
- The Rolling Stones - Some Girls (1978)
- Carillo - Rings Around the Moon (1978)
- Terry Reid - Rogue Waves (1979)
- The Rolling Stones - Emotional Rescue (1980)
- The Rolling Stones - Tattoo You (1981)
- Doc Holliday - Doc Holliday (1981)
- Bill Wyman - Bill Wyman (1982)
- Peter Tosh - Mama Africa (1983)
- The Rolling Stones - Undercover (1983)
- The Colourfield - Virgins and Philistines (1985)
- Marillion - Misplaced Childhood (1985)
- Killing Joke - Night Time (1985)
- Siouxsie and the Banshees - "The Sweetest Chill (extended mix)" (1986) (unreleased mix, later issued in 2009)
- Killing Joke - Brighter Than a Thousand Suns (1986)
- The Psychedelic Furs - Midnight to Midnight (1987)
- Anderson Bruford Wakeman Howe - Anderson Bruford Wakeman Howe (1989)
- Diesel Park West - Shakespeare Alabama (1989)
- The Rolling Stones - Steel Wheels (1989)
- The Rolling Stones - Flashpoint (1991)
- The Rolling Stones - Stones at the Max (1991)
- Fish - Internal Exile (1991)
- Colin James - Colin James and the Little Big Band (1993)
- Johnny Hallyday - Parc des Princes 1993 (1993)
- Curt Smith - Soul on Board (1993)
- Wendy James - Now Ain't the Time for Your Tears (1993)
- INXS - Full Moon Dirty Hearts (1993)
- London Symphony Orchestra - Symphonic Music of the Rolling Stones (1994)
- The Rolling Stones - Stripped (1995)
- Fish - Yin (1995)
- The Chieftains - The Long Black Veil (1995)
- Colin James - Bad Habits (1995)
- Johnny Hallyday - Lorada (1995)
- Johnny Hallyday - Destination Vegas (1996)
- Various - Kingpin (soundtrack) (1996)
- Gipsy Kings - Compas (1996)
- Billionaire - Ascension (1999)
- The Proclaimers - Persevere (2001)
- The Chieftains - The Wide World Over (2002)
- David Knopfler - Wishbones (2002)
- The Bandits - And They Walked Away (2003)
- David Knopfler - Ship of Dreams (2004)
- Tony Moore - Perfect and Beautiful (2005)
- The Chieftains - Live from Dublin: A Tribute to Derek Bell (2005)
- Gary Wright - Extraction/Footprint (2005)
- Canterbury Glass - Sacred Scenes and Characters (2007)
- New Model Army - High (2007)
- Peter Frampton - Wind of Change/Frampton's Camel (2008)
- Chris Jagger - The Ridge (2009)
- Peter Frampton - Thank You Mr. Churchill (2010)
- Very Emergency - The Getaway (2010)
- Saint Jude - Diary of a Soul Fiend (2010)
- Thirsty - Thirsty (2014)
- Short Stack - Dance with Me (2015)
- Sweet Loretta - Talking To Yourself (again) (2022)
- Sweet Loretta - Run Run Run (2023)
