= Frank Usher =

English guitarist and guitar maker

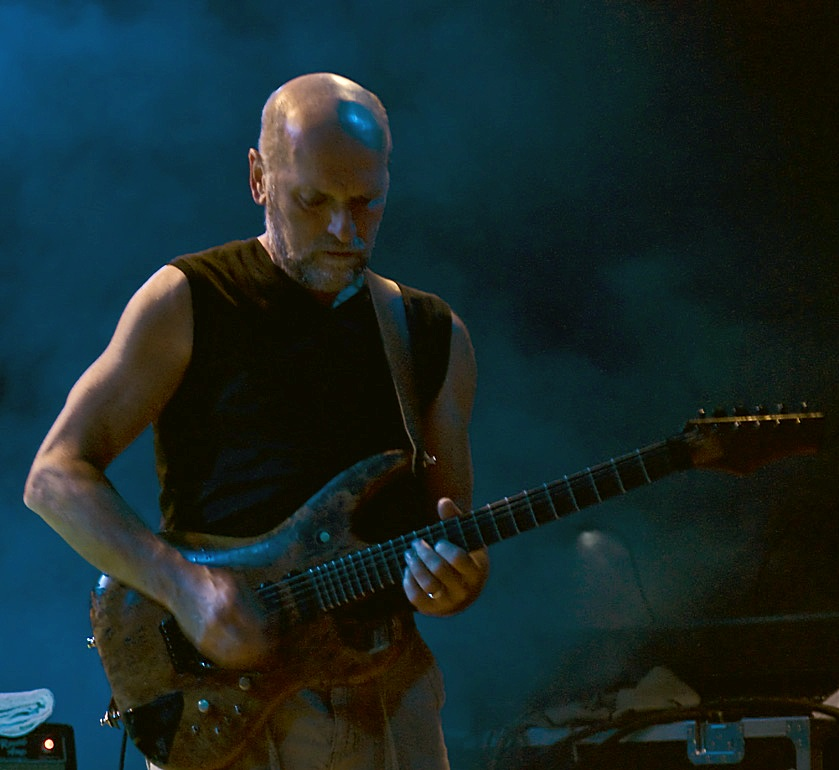
Frank Usher – Fish live in Italy (2009).

Frank Usher (born 4 August 1949, in Gateshead, County Durham, England) is an English guitarist best known for his work in Fish's band. Usher lives and operates a guitar-manufacturing business in Innerleithen, Scotland. Throughout the 1970s and 1980s he has worked with a variety of artists including Mike Heron, John Martyn, Tam White and the locally noted Border Boogie Band.

While playing in a band called Blewitt in 1980, he first met Fish who became their vocalist for a short time. When Fish left Marillion to start a solo career in 1988, he contacted Usher to become his guitarist. Since then he has played on seven Fish studio albums and the accompanying tours.

Usher suffered a heart attack in December 2007, causing three gigs to be cancelled.

== Fish discography with Frank Usher on guitar ==
=== Studio albums ===
- 1990: Vigil in a Wilderness of Mirrors
- 1991: Internal Exile
- 1993: Songs from the Mirror (covers album)
- 1994: Suits
- 1997: Sunsets on Empire
- 2004: Field of Crows
- 2007: 13th Star

=== Compilation albums ===
- 1995: Yin and Yang
- 1998: Kettle of Fish (88–98)
- 2005: Bouillabaisse

=== Singles ===
- 1989: "State of Mind"
- 1989: "Big Wedge"
- 1990: "A Gentleman's Excuse Me"
- 1990: "The Company" (Germany only)
- 1991: "Internal Exile"
- 1991: "Credo"
- 1992: "Something in the Air"
- 1992: "Never Mind The Bullocks" (feat. Hold Your Head Up)
- 1994: "Lady Let It Lie"
- 1994: "Fortunes of War"
- 1994: "Emperors song"
- 1995: "Just Good Friends" (feat. Sam Brown)
- 1997: "Brother 52"
- 1997: "Change of Heart"
- 2008: "Arc of the Curve"
- 2008: "Zoë 25"
