= Saint Jude (band) =

British rock and soul band

- Origin: London, England
- Genres: Blues rock, hard rock, Southern rock, soul, British rock
- Years active: 2008–2014
- Labels: Cargo
- Past members: Lynne Jackaman; Adam Green; Lee Cook; Elliott Mortimer; Colin Palmer Kellogg; Marcus Bonfanti; Matt Gest; Scott Wiber
- Website: Official website

Saint Jude were an English, London-based rock and soul band, fronted by the vocalist Lynne Jackaman.

They released their debut album, Diary of a Soul Fiend, in September 2010, which was produced by Chris Kimsey and recorded in Lexington, Kentucky featuring Jackaman, Adam Green, Lee Cook, Elliott Mortimer and Colin Palmer Kellogg as core members. In January 2010 they were joined on stage by Rolling Stones guitarist Ronnie Wood at London's 100 Club.

On 11 December 2011, they were named Classic Rock magazine 's "Gig of the Week." They played the Germany Rockpalast venue (which was later broadcast on WDR), Rhythm Festival, Off The Tracks Festival, Cornbury Festival, High Voltage Festival, the UK leg of Sonisphere Festival, and completed a mini tour of the UK in December, finishing with a headline slot at London's Scala venue. They were also nominated Best New Band at the 2011 Classic Rock Roll of Honour.

In 2012, Saint Jude began writing for their follow-up to Diary of a Soul Fiend. On 8 November 2012, they announced a PledgeMusic campaign for an upcoming EP, to be released in February 2013, entitled Ladies & Gents.

== Members ==
- Lynne Jackaman – vocals (founding member)
- Adam Green (died 2012) – guitar (founding member)
- Lee Cook – drums (founding member)
- Elliot Mortimer – keyboards
- Colin Palmer Kellogg – bass
- Marcus Bonfanti – guitar
- Matt Gest – keyboards
- Scott Wiber – bass
- Ivor Sims – guitar
- Joe Glossop

== Discography ==
Studio albums

- Diary of a Soul Fiend (2010) (Line-up: Jackaman, Green, Mortimer, Cook and Kellogg)

EPs

- Ladies & Gents (2013)
