= Doc Holliday (band) =

American Southern rock band

Doc Holliday was an American Southern rock band from Warner Robins, Georgia, United States, who were named after the American frontier gambler, gunfighter, and dentist, Doc Holliday.

== Career ==
In 1971 Bruce Brookshire, a guitarist, singer and songwriter, along with his brother Bob, formed a blues band called Roundhouse. Towards the end of that decade, a later version of Roundhouse came to the attention of Nantucket's managers Bill Cain and Jet Matthews, which led to the group's name-change to Doc Holliday and a recording contract with A&M Records. Their initial recording line-up comprised Bruce Brookshire, John Samuelson, Ric Skelton, Eddie Stone and Herman Nixon, who recorded their self-titled debut album in 1980. It was produced by Tom Allom and peaked in the Top 30 of the Billboard 200. This was followed the next year by Doc Holliday Rides Again, which used the services of both Allom and co-producer David Anderle.

The band went on to share tours with Black Sabbath, Gregg Allman, April Wine, Loverboy, Stevie Ray Vaughan, Charlie Daniels Band, Blackfoot, Pat Travers, Point Blank, Molly Hatchet and many others. Doc Holliday's third album, Modern Medicine, was recorded in Munich by the German producer 'Mack', who was chosen by the band for his success with Queen, and with Billy Squier at that time. "His name was at the top of the charts then. It was that simple. When we first met (Mack), I said that I would provide the songs and asked that he handle the production his way." said Brookshire. "Techno, synthesizers, and Duran Duran were taking over the music world. We wanted a hit record and thought that was the best way to do it." The resulting album alienated some of their existing fan base for its change in musical direction. After a lukewarm release, a failed tour, and being dropped by their management and record label simultaneously, the band ground to a halt in 1984.

Determined to reinvigorate the group, a drummer named Jamie Deckard pushed Brookshire, Stone, and Samuelson to reform, and by 1986 the group released a fourth album, Danger Zone on the London-based Metal Masters label. Its European success found the band returning to its classic style. During the mid-1980s, keyboardist Tony Cooper, guitarist Tommy "Too Tall" Evans, drummer Ross Lindsey, original guitarist Ric Skelton, and drummer John Vaughn, would contribute their talents to an ever-evolving lineup. Guitarist Billy Yates, later with Outlaws, had two stints in the band, and female backing vocalists June Reppert and Karen Barlow were featured for a time. In 1989, the album, Song for the Outlaw - Live, garnered good reviews. A version of the group not on the album embarked on an extensive overseas tour in support of the release, with dates in Scandinavia, England and Wales, Switzerland and Germany. Throughout the 1990s the band solidified with Brookshire on lead guitar and vocals, original member John Samuelson on lead and rhythm guitar, Daniel "Bud" Ford on bass guitar, and Danny "Cadillac" Lastinger on drums. They released the albums Son of the Morning Star and Legacy, touring Europe with each. The album Gunfighter-The Best of the 90's also came from this line-up. During that time, the band headlined festival shows in Scandinavia and Europe, including 'The Bulldog Bash', a large annual British music festival in Stratford-upon-Avon, which was featured in Kerrang! magazine, and Headbanger's Ball on British MTV.

By late 2000, original member Eddie Stone rejoined the band and appeared on all subsequent albums and tours including A Better Road, Good Time Music, Rebel Souls, and Twenty-Five Absolutely Live. For another decade the band continued to record and tour, maintaining a consistent presence in Europe. Doc Holliday's final release was a collection of remixed, lost, and bonus tracks titled From The Vault. In 2011, the band embarked on their 30th Anniversary-Farewell Tour of Germany, Sweden, France, Belgium, and the UK. A few years later, Eddie Stone (and occasionally Daniel Ford) recruited various musicians to perform under the name Doc Holliday at various one-off shows. These performances re-imagined the band to a segment of its hard-core fans, but has not led to a consistent presentation or any new material. Eddie Stone is currently the only Doc Holliday band member who still performs rock shows, occasionally as a member of Capricorn Records' group Stillwater. Stone today is primarily the keyboard and vocalist for Wet Willie featuring Jimmy Hall.

== Original lineup 1981-1983 ==
- Bruce Brookshire - Lead guitar, lead vocals
- Eddie Stone - Keyboards, vocals
- John Samuelson - Bass guitar, vocals
- Ric Skelton - Lead guitar, vocals
- Herman Nixon - Drums

== Longest lineup ==
- Bruce Brookshire - Lead vocals, lead & rhythm guitar
- John Turner Samuelson - Lead and rhythm guitar, vocals
- Eddie Stone - guitar, keyboards, vocals
- Daniel "Bud" Ford - Bass guitar,
- Danny "Cadillac" Lastinger- Drums

== Discography ==
=== Studio albums ===
- Doc Holliday (1981)
- Doc Holliday Rides Again (1982)
- Modern Medicine (1983)
- Danger Zone (1986)
- Son of the Morning Star (1993)
- Legacy (1996)
- A Better Road (2001)
- Good Time Music (2003)
- Rebel Souls (2006)
- From The Vault (2011)

=== Live albums ===
- Song for the Outlaw – Live (1989)
- 25 – Absolutely Live (2008)

=== Compilations ===
- Gunfighter: The Best of the '90s (2003) compilation of Son of the Morning Star and Legacy plus two previously unreleased tracks.

== Doc Holliday Music ==
In 2020, a substantial amount of the band's catalog was leased by Grand Union Records and made available for purchase and streaming on all popular outlets.
