= Blind to the Beautiful =

EP by Fish
- Released: 28 April 2014
- Genre: Progressive rock
- Label: Chocolate Frog Record Company

Fish chronology
A Feast of Consequences (2013)	Blind to the Beautiful (2014)	A Parley with Angels (2018)

Fish single singles chronology
"Zoe 25" (2008)	"Blind to the Beautiful" (2014)

Blind to the Beautiful is a single and EP from Fish's 10th solo album, A Feast of Consequences. It is Fish's first single to reach the Top 40 in the UK Independent Singles chart in over 20 years. The lyrics address global warming. A video clip was made containing footage provided by Greenpeace.

== Track listing ==
=== Single Release ===
No.	Title	Length
1.	"Blind to the Beautiful" (Radio Edit)	4:39
2.	"Blind to the Beautiful" (Live in Karlsruhe, 2013)	7:25
3.	"Blind to the Beautiful" (Demo Version)	7:09

=== EP Release ===
No.	Title	Length
1.	"Blind to the Beautiful"	5:12
2.	"A Feast of Consequences" (Live in Karlsruhe, 2013)	4:23
3.	"Perfume River" (Live in Karlsruhe, 2013)	11:08

== Charts ==
=== Weekly ===
Year	Chart	Position
2014	UK Independent Singles Chart	36
