= Fiona J. Mackenzie =

Fiona Mackenzie

Background information
- Born: Morayshire, Scotland
- Genres: Gaelic; Celtic; Folk
- Occupations: Singer, song tutor, consultant
- Label: Greentrax
- Website: fionamackenzie.org

Fiona J. Mackenzie is a Scottish Gaelic traditional singer from Dingwall, Highland Scotland, and has toured and performed throughout Europe and North America. In 2005, she won the An Comunn Gàidhealach Gold Medal at the Royal National Mòd in Stornoway.

== Career ==
In 2004, Mackenzie was voted the BBC Scotland Traditional Music Personality of the Year at the Scottish Trad Music Awards. She was also nominated as Gaelic Singer of the Year in both 2005 and 2006.

Mackenzie is a self-employed Gaelic Arts consultant and works throughout Scotland. Between 2002 and May 2009 she worked for the Highland Council as the "Mairi Mhor Gaelic Song Fellow", promoting Gaelic song and language throughout the communities of the north of Scotland. As part of her role she organised and managed the young, all-girl Gaelic harmony group "Fionnar" who have competed successfully at the Pan Celtic Festival and the Welsh International Eisteddfod.

Mackenzie is a member of the Inverness Gaelic Choir. She also hosts the "Kitchen Ceilidh" on Scottish Internet Radio. In 2008 Mackenzie was selected as one of the Scottish representatives in the Nòs Ùr song competition.

In April 2009, Mackenzie ran a Gaelic singing course with gold medallist Gillebrìde MacMillan in Andalusia, Spain. In July 2009, she adjudicated at the Welsh International Eisteddfod, including the "Choir of the World competition".

In October 2009, Mackenzie was announced as one of the winners of the "Burnsong International Songwriting Competition".

In 2011, as a result of the Burnsong competition, Fiona and her fellow Burnsong winners formed a new band named, "The Kilmarnock Edition".

Fiona launched her third Greentrax album, Archipelago, in July 2012. It was nominated for Folk Roots Album of the Year at the Scottish New Music Awards held in Glasgow on 2 September 2012.

In September 2013 Fiona toured a new production in association with the National Theatre of Scotland, "A Little Bird Blown Off Course" which is based on the life and works of Margaret Faye Shaw.

In May 2015 Mackenzie took up the post of archivist for the National Trust for Scotland, Canna Collection on the Hebridean island of Canna.

Her 2025 book The Cadence of a Song was shortlisted for the James Tait Black Memorial Prize for biography in 2026.

== Discography ==
- Astair (2000)
- Seinn o ho ro Seinn (2003)
- Òrain nan Rosach (2006)
- Duan Nollaig (2007) on Greentrax Recordings
- Deagh Dheis Aodaich (2009) on Greentrax Recordings
- Archipelago (2012) on Greentrax Recordings

== Published works ==
- Orain nan Rosach published by the Highland Council (2006)
- Crunluath Collection published by the Highland Council (2006)
- Duan Nollaig Volume 1 (available from Fiona J. Mackenzie)
- Eilean: The Photography of Margaret Fay Shaw (as editor) published by Birlinn (2018)
- The Cadence of a Song: The Life of Margaret Fay Shaw published by Birlinn (2025)
