= Yin and Yang (albums) =

Yin

Compilation album by Fish
- Released: 28 August 1995
- Genre: Progressive rock
- Label: Dick Bros Record Company
- Producer: James Cassidy and others

Fish chronology
Suits (1994)	Yin (1995)	Sunsets on Empire (1997)

Yang

Singles from Yin / Yang
- 1. "Just Good Friends" Released: 14 August 1995

Yin and Yang are the titles of two separate compilation albums by Fish co-released in 1995. They are a retrospective on Fish's four solo albums and four albums with Marillion.

Yin and Yang were released on Fish's independent label Dick Bros Record Company. There also was a "radio edits" promotional release containing eight tracks, each with a roughly one-minute-long introduction spoken by Fish. This CD was also available as a fan-club mail-order edition.

== Music ==
Thirteen of the 26 tracks across both albums have been re-recorded (including all the Marillion tracks) or remixed; the rest remain in their original versions.

The re-recorded Marillion tracks are "Punch & Judy", "Incubus" (from Fugazi, 1984), "Kayleigh", "Lavender" (from Misplaced Childhood, 1985), "Incommunicado" and "Sugar Mice" (Clutching at Straws, 1987). Another track ("Institution Waltz") is a new version of a Marillion song they demoed and played live but never properly recorded.

The re-recorded solo tracks are "State of Mind" (1990, from Vigil in a Wilderness of Mirrors), "Credo", "Lucky", "Favourite Stranger", "Just Good Friends" (now a duet with Sam Brown) (1991, from Internal Exile), and "Somebody Special" (1994, from Suits).

The title track of the 1991 album Internal Exile appears in its previously unreleased original version recorded in 1989. It would later become a bonus track on re-issues of Vigil in a Wilderness of Mirrors.

The set also contains three cover versions: Sandy Denny's "Solo" appears as found on the 1993 covers album Songs from the Mirror. "Time and a Word" is a Yes song recorded during the Songs from the Mirror sessions, but left off the original version of that album. Instead, it first appeared on the compilation Outpatients '93, though it has since been included on a re-issue of Songs from the Mirror. Yes guitarist Steve Howe, who appears as a guest musician on this track, was not yet in Yes when the song was written. There is a version of the Sensational Alex Harvey Band's "Boston Tea Party", which is not identical with the one on Songs from the Mirror, but was newly recorded with the members of the original SAHB line-up.

== Personnel ==
The new versions of existing material were recorded by Fish's then-current line-up: Frank Usher, Robin Boult (guitars), Foster Paterson (keyboards), David Paton (bass), and Dave Stewart (drums). Stewart had recently replaced Kevin Wilkinson, who had moved on to The Proclaimers. "Just Good Friends", originally from Internal Exile but presented here as a duet featuring Sam Brown, was also released as a lead single. All the new tracks were mixed and produced by James Cassidy, who had previously worked on Songs from the Mirror and Suits.

== Cover ==
The outside cover, a relatively simple concept based on the yin and yang symbol (with each element in the shape of a fish) surrounded by a circular Celtic knot pattern, was again designed by permanent Fish collaborator Mark Wilkinson. The Yin version of the cover has a black symbol on a white/greyish background, the Yang version has a white symbol against a dark-red/black background. (On the Radio Edits CD cover, the two fishes are in different colours, more similar to the actual yin and yang symbol.) "1980 1995" is written in the upper left corner, apparently in reference to Marillion. Actually, Fish did not join Marillion until 1981, making this a somewhat dubious attempt at citing an anniversary as the occasion for this retrospective. The booklets contain several photographs of Fish mostly taken on the Scottish coast.

== Single ==
The new version of "Just Good Friends", a duet with Sam Brown, was released as a lead single on 14 August 1995. It failed to enter the UK top 40, spending one week at #63 in the UK Singles Chart.

== Tour ==
The album was supported by an extensive 80-date world tour, at that time the longest Fish had undertaken since leaving Marillion. It included several countries never covered by any previous tours (some of which are rarely visited by international acts), such as Argentina, Bosnia, Brazil, Chile, Croatia, Estonia, Hong Kong, Singapore, Slovakia, Turkey. There were also six gigs in Poland, one of which (originally captured for national TV) would later be released as the video and live album Krakow. The tour was briefly stopped when, while in Estonia, bassist David Paton was called away on a family matter but never returned. He was replaced by Ewen Vernal (formerly of Deacon Blue).

== Track listing ==
=== Yin ===
No.	Title	Writer(s)	Original source	Length
1.	"Incommunicado" (1995 re-recording)	Derek Dick, Steve Rothery, Mark Kelly, Pete Trewavas, Ian Mosley	Marillion's Clutching at Straws (1987)	5:08
2.	"Family Business"	Dick, Mickey Simmonds, Hal Lindes	Vigil in a Wilderness of Mirrors (1990)	5:14
3.	"Just Good Friends" (1995 re-recording featuring Sam Brown)	Dick, Frank Usher, Robin Boult, Simmonds	Internal Exile (1991)	5:46
4.	"Pipeline"	Dick, David Paton, Boult	Suits (1994)	6:55
5.	"Institution Waltz" (1995 recording)	Dick, Diz Minnitt, Rothery, Kelly, Mick Pointer	previously unreleased Marillion song	4:03
6.	"Tongues"	Dick, Simmonds, Usher, Boult	Internal Exile (1990)	6:17
7.	"Time and a Word" (1993 recording with Steve Howe)	Jon Anderson, David Foster	Yes cover, originally from the compilation Outpatients '93, later included on the re-issue of Songs from the Mirror (1998)	4:22
8.	"The Company"	Dick, Simmonds	Vigil in a Wilderness of Mirrors (1990)	4:05
9.	"Incubus" (1995 re-recording)	Dick, Rothery, Kelly, Mosley, Trewavas	Marillion's Fugazi (1984)	9:40
10.	"Solo"	Sandy Denny	Songs from the Mirror (1993)	4:10
11.	"Favourite Stranger" (1995 re-recording)	Dick, Usher	Internal Exile (1991)	6:03
12.	"Boston Tea Party" (1995 re-recording with the Sensational Alex Harvey Band)	Alex Harvey, Hugh McKenna, Zal Cleminson, Stevie Doherty.	Songs from the Mirror (1993)	4:58
13.	"Raw Meat" (edited intro)	Dick, Usher	Suits (1994)	6:52
Total length:				73:43

=== Yang ===
No.	Title	Writer(s)	Original source	Length
1.	"Lucky" (1995 re-recording)	Dick, Boult, Simmonds	Internal Exile (1991)	4:55
2.	"Big Wedge" (1995 remix of 1990 original)	Dick, Simmonds	Vigil in a Wilderness of Mirrors (1990)	5:49
3.	"Lady Let It Lie" (1995 remix of 1994 original)	Dick, Paton, James Cassidy	Suits (1994)	6:56
4.	"Lavender" (1995 re-recording)	Dick, Rothery, Kelly, Trewavas, Mosley	Marillion's Misplaced Childhood (1985)	4:59
5.	"Credo" (1995 re-recording)	Dick, Simmonds, Boult, Usher	Internal Exile (1991)	6:46
6.	"A Gentleman's Excuse Me"	Dick, Simmonds	Vigil in a Wilderness of Mirrors (1990)	4:16
7.	"Kayleigh" (1995 re-recording)	Dick, Rothery, Kelly, Trewavas, Mosley	Marillion's Misplaced Childhood (1985)	4:10
8.	"State of Mind" (1995 re-recording)	Dick, Simmonds, Lindes	Vigil in a Wilderness of Mirrors (1990)	6:50
9.	"Somebody Special" (1995 re-recording)	Dick, Boult, Paton	Suits (1994)	4:23
10.	"Sugar Mice" (1995 re-recording)	Dick, Rothery, Kelly, Trewavas, Mosley	Marillion's Clutching at Straws (1987)	6:19
11.	"Punch & Judy" (1995 re-recording)	Dick, Rothery, Kelly, Trewavas, Mosley	Marillion's Fugazi (1984)	3:28
12.	"Fortunes of War"	Dick, Cassidy, Boult	Suits (1994)	8:08
13.	"Internal Exile" (1989 recording not previously released)	Dick, Boult, Simmonds	originally recorded Vigil in a Wilderness of Mirrors (1990), a later version was released on Internal Exile (1991)	4:48
Total length:				71:56

== Charts ==
Yin

Country	Peak position
Netherlands	68
United Kingdom	58

Yang

Country	Peak position
Netherlands	73
United Kingdom	52
