= Suits (album) =

- Cover art by Mark Wilkinson

Studio album by Fish
- Released: 16 May 1994
- Studio: Funny Farm Recording Studios (East Lothian, Scotland)
- Genre: Progressive rock
- Length: 64:39
- Label: Dick Bros Record Company
- Producer: James Cassidy

Fish chronology
Songs from the Mirror (1993)	Suits (1994)	Yin/Yang (1995)

Alternative cover
- Artwork on 1998 Roadrunner Records release

Singles from Suits
- 1. "Lady Let It Lie" Released: 5 April 1994; 2. "Fortunes of War" Released: 19 September 1994

Professional ratings
Review scores
Source	Rating
AllMusic	2.5/5 stars
Music Week	3/5 stars

Suits is the fourth solo album by former Marillion singer Fish, and his third studio album with original material (discounting 1993's cover project Songs from the Mirror). It is the first album to be released on Fish's new own label, the Dick Bros Record Company, which he set up after being dropped by Polydor. The album continues the cooperation with producer James Cassidy who had already produced Songs from the Mirror. Cassidy also contributed keyboards recordings and co-wrote five out of ten songs on the original version of this album. Together with keyboardist Foster Paterson, who had been part of the tour line-up since 1992 and co-wrote three tracks, Cassidy takes the role previously held by Mickey Simmonds. Further songwriting credits go to guitarist Robin Boult and bassist David Paton.

The album took Fish the longest time yet to make, several songs on it had already premiered live in summer of 1992.

== Singles and chart positions ==
Despite the lack of major label support, it went to no. 18 on the UK Albums Chart, doing better than both the 1991 album Internal Exile (no. 21) and Songs from the Mirror, which did not chart. However, this would turn out to be Fish's last UK top 40 album. Two singles released from this album ("Lady Let It Lie" and "Fortunes of War") failed to enter the UK top 40. In an attempt to keep up sales for "Fortunes of War" over a longer period, Fish had decided to release four versions of the CD single across four weeks. As an incentive, every individual single CD contained a different version of the title track and three different acoustic recordings each, adding up to a full acoustic album in terms of playing time. However, record shops frustrated this scheme by often selling the complete four-disc set at one time. A CD of all the acoustic tracks also called Fortunes of War was later released.

== Re-releases ==
After Fish signed with Roadrunner Records in 1998, Suits was re-released on this label along with the other studio albums from the back catalogue. The re-release contained two bonus tracks previously released as B-side of "Lady Let It Lie" and the double vinyl edition.

== Track listing ==
No.	Title	Writer(s)	Length
1.	"Mr 1470"	Dick, Foster Paterson, Robin Boult	6:04
2.	"Lady Let It Lie"	Dick, David Paton, James Cassidy	6:53
3.	"Emperor's Song"	Dick, Cassidy, Boult	6:18
4.	"Fortunes Of War"	Dick, Cassidy, Boult	7:50
5.	"Somebody Special"	Dick, Boult, Paton	5:22
6.	"No Dummy"	Dick, Cassidy, Boult	6:16
7.	"Pipeline"	Dick, Paton, Boult	6:43
8.	"Jumpsuit City"	Dick, Cassidy, Boult	6:49
9.	"Bandwagon"	Dick, Paton, Boult, Paterson, Kevin Wilkinson	5:07
10.	"Raw Meat"	Dick, Paterson	7:17

Remastered edition bonus tracks
No.	Title	Writer(s)	Length
11.	"Black Canal"	Dick, Paterson	8:26
12.	"Out Of My Life"	Dick, Boult	3:45

The Remasters Disc 2: Demos
No.	Title	Length
1.	"Somebody Special (1992 Demo)"	4:25
2.	"Pipeline (1992 Demo)"	6:18
3.	"Out Of My Life (1992 Demo)"	3:39
4.	"Mr. 1470 (1992 Demo)"	4:23
5.	"Pipeline (1992 Demo)"	7:10
6.	"Somebody Special (1992 Demo)"	4:21
7.	"Raw Meat (1992 Demo)"	4:44
8.	"Lady Let It Lie (1993 Demo)"	6:05
9.	"Bandwagon (1993 Demo)"	3:30
10.	"Mr. 1470 (1993 Demo)"	6:10
11.	"Jumpsuit City (1993 Demo)"	4:44
12.	"Somebody Special (1993 Demo)"	5:08
13.	"Emperor's Song (1993 Demo)"	6:13
14.	"Lady Let It Lie (Acoustic Radio Session, Haddington 1994)"	5:55

The Remasters Disc 3: Live
No.	Title	Length
1.	"Mr. 1470 (Live at Haddington Convention 1994)"	6:30
2.	"Fortunes Of War (Live at Haddington Convention 1994)"	6:27
3.	"Somebody Special (Live at Norwich 1994)"	4:46
4.	"Black Canal (Live at Lucerne 1995)"	7:04
5.	"Jumpsuit City (Live at Lucerne 1995)"	5:09
6.	"Pipeline (Live at Lucerne 1995)"	7:31
7.	"Emperor's Song (Live at Krakow 1995)"	5:52
8.	"Lady Let It Lie (Live at Krakow 1995)"	6:05
9.	"Jumpsuit City (Live at St Mary's Church 2006)"	5:30
10.	"Fortunes Of War (Live at St Mary's Church 2006)"	6:37
11.	"Raw Meat (Live at Poznan 2011)"	9:55

== Personnel ==
Per album liner notes:

- Derek W Dick (Fish) – lead vocals
- Foster Paterson – keyboards, backing vocals
- James Cassidy – additional keyboards
- Frank Usher – guitars
- Robin Boult – guitars
- David Paton – bass, backing vocals
- Kevin Wilkinson – drums, percussion
- David Murray – bagpipes
- Bill Gilles – saxophone (4, 6)
- Marc Duff – flute (4, 9), whistle (4, 9)
- Charlie McKerron – fiddle (5, 9)
- Fraser Speirs – harmonica (8)
- Lorna Bannon – additional backing vocals
- Danny Campbell – additional backing vocals
- Know Academy Senior Choir – choir (2)
- Ken Johnson – choir conductor (2)

== Production ==
- James Cassidy – producer, arrangements, engineer, mixing
- Steve Pearce – assistant engineer
- Dream Disc – sleeve design
- Julie Wilkinson – cover illustration
- Mark Wilkinson – cover illustration
- Stuart James – photography
- Robin Ayling – label manager

== Charts ==
Country	Peak position
Germany	84
Netherlands	22
United Kingdom	18
