= A Feast of Consequences =

- Cover art by Mark Wilkinson

Studio album by Fish
- Released: 4 September 2013
- Genre: Progressive rock
- Length: 66:56
- Label: Chocolate Frog Record Company
- Producer: Calum Malcolm

Fish chronology
| 13th Star (2007) | A Feast of Consequences (2013) | Blind to the Beautiful (2014) |

Singles from A Feast of Consequences
- 1. "Blind to the Beautiful" Released: 28 April 2014

A Feast of Consequences is the tenth solo studio album (and ninth of original material) by Fish since he left Marillion in 1988 . It is his first since 13th Star (2007). It was released on Fish's own imprint Chocolate Frog Record Company.

== Track listing ==
All songs written by Dick/Vantsis/Boult, except where noted.

=== CD edition ===
| No. | Title | Writer(s) | Length |
|---|---|---|---|
| 1. | "Perfume River" | Dick, Vantsis | 10:58 |
| 2. | "All Loved Up" | | 5:07 |
| 3. | "Blind to the Beautiful" | | 5:12 |
| 4. | "A Feast of Consequences" | | 4:29 |
| 5. | "High Wood" | Dick, Paterson | 5:26 |
| 6. | "Crucifix Corner" | Dick, Paterson | 7:25 |
| 7. | "The Gathering" | Dick, Paterson | 4:30 |
| 8. | "Thistle Alley" | | 6:08 |
| 9. | "The Leaving" | Dick, Paterson, Boult | 4:59 |
| 10. | "The Other Side of Me" | | 6:08 |
| 11. | "The Great Unravelling" | | 6:31 |

=== Vinyl edition ===
Side one
| No. | Title | Writer(s) | Length |
|---|---|---|---|
| 1. | "Perfume River" | Dick, Vantsis | 10:58 |
| 2. | "High Wood" | Dick, Paterson | 5:21 |
| 3. | "Crucifix Corner" | Dick, Paterson | 7:20 |

Side two
| No. | Title | Writer(s) | Length |
|---|---|---|---|
| 1. | "The Gathering" | Dick, Paterson | 4:33 |
| 2. | "Thistle Alley" | | 6:09 |
| 3. | "The Leaving" | Dick, Paterson, Boult | 5:03 |
| 4. | "The Other Side of Me" | | 6:05 |

Side three
| No. | Title | Length |
|---|---|---|
| 1. | "A Feast of Consequences" | 4:35 |
| 2. | "All Loved Up" | 5:09 |
| 3. | "Blind to the Beautiful" | 5:14 |
| 4. | "The Great Unravelling" | 6:31 |

Side four
| No. | Title | Writer(s) | Length |
|---|---|---|---|
| 1. | "Perfume River" (Live) | Dick, Vantsis | 11:08 |
| 2. | "A Feast of Consequences" (Live) | | 4:23 |
| 3. | "Blind to the Beautiful" (Live) | | 7:25 |

- Side Four Live tracks recorded at Karlsruhe Substage 25 October 2013.

Also released was a deluxe special edition box set version that included the album on cd and a DVD with interviews with Fish about the making of the album and Mark Wilkinson about the artwork for the album. Also on the DVD is 'The Moveable Feast Tour' about preparing for the tour for the album. Advance pre-orders for the deluxe special edition included a certificate of authenticity signed by Fish and Mark Wilkinson.

== Personnel ==
- Fish (Derek W. Dick) – vocals, lyrics
- Robin Boult – guitars
- Steve Vantsis – bass guitar
- Foss Paterson – keyboards
- Gavin Griffiths – drums
- Elisabeth Troy Antwi – backing vocals
