= Songs from the Mirror =

Songs From The Mirror

Studio album by Fish
- Released: 18 January 1993
- Recorded: 1992
- Studio: Funny Farm; Haddington, Mid-Lothian, Scotland
- Genre: Rock
- Length: 44:53
- Label: Polydor
- Producer: James Cassidy

Fish chronology
Internal Exile (1991)	Songs From The Mirror (1993)	Suits (1994)

Alternative cover
- Artwork on 1998 Roadrunner Records release

Singles from Songs From The Mirror
- 1. "Never Mind The Bullocks (Hold Your Head Up)" Released: 23 November 1992

Professional ratings
Review scores
Source	Rating
Allmusic	3/5 stars

Songs from the Mirror is the third solo album by Scottish singer-songwriter Fish, released in 1993 as his final album for Polydor. It does not contain any original material; instead it is a cover album featuring Fish's versions of songs by artists who inspired him before his career started. It reached 46 on the UK Albums Chart.

== Background ==
The album was influenced by David Bowie's 1973 covers project, Pin Ups. Fish included a version of his favourite Bowie song, "Five Years". He also recorded versions of songs by The Moody Blues, Alex Harvey, Pink Floyd, The Kinks, Argent, Sandy Denny, Genesis and T Rex. The songs all date from a period between 1970 and 1976 and reflect Fish's taste in music when he was 12 to 18 years old. The title is a reference to the time when he would impersonate his teenage idols in front of a mirror.

Polydor initially rejected the idea of a cover album, but eventually accepted it as the second album Fish was obliged to deliver under their contract. As of April 2016, Songs from the Mirror is Fish's last ever output on a major record company; however, he did record for Roadrunner Records in the late 90s, an indie label with major distribution later sold to a conglomerate.

== Musicians ==
The core line-up on this album is the same as on the 1992 tour. Since the recording of Internal Exile, keyboardist Mickey Simmonds had been replaced with Foster Paterson, while drummer Kevin Wilkinson had taken over from session player Ethan Johns. The spots for guitars (Robin Boult, Frank Usher) and bass (David Paton) had remained unchanged. Other than that and backing vocals, only two tracks ("Solo" and "Jeepster") feature an additional guest musician, Ben Molleson on violin and tin whistle. Fish tried to get David Bowie to play the saxophone solo on "Five Years", but he didn't manage to get hold of Bowie, and the saxophone solo was skipped. The album was mixed and produced by James Cassidy, who Fish had met while recording guest vocals for Jeff Wayne's musical Spartacus. Cassidy would also produce and co-write Fish's next album Suits (1994).

== Single release ==
Only a lead single was released from this album, with Argent's 1972 hit "Hold Your Head Up" as the A-Side. This was actually marketed as an EP entitled Never Mind The Bullocks (featuring Hold Your Head Up) even though the 7" and CD single only contained two and three songs respectively. Also, these songs were to be found on the album, providing little incentive for fans to purchase the single. A second single with David Bowie's "Five Years" as the A-Side was in the pipeline, but never officially released; only a radio promo exists.

== Cover art ==
Songs from the Mirror is the only regular Fish album not to be designed by Mark Wilkinson. Fish had deliberately decided to not use Wilkinson, as he didn't want to give the impression it was an album with original material. Instead, he chose "The Guddler" by Scottish painter Keith McIntyre as the cover. "The Guddler" had also been the working title of the project.

== Tour ==
The album was followed by a tour, which was significantly longer than the previous tour promoting Internal Exile. After the 1992 "Toile Tour" in club-sized venues, this tour saw Fish return to large-capacity halls. However, this was also the last time he regularly played such venues. The stage design initially featured 'nets' which separated the band from Fish. Some found this somewhat egotistical while others saw that it allowed Fish to interact with the audience and heighten the sense of atmosphere. However, after morale began to fall in the band, Fish finally decided to get rid of the nets and resumed with his normal stage setup. The double live album Sushi (1994) was recorded during this tour and features five Songs from the Mirror.

== Re-releases ==
After Fish signed with Roadrunner Records in 1998, Songs from the Mirror was re-released on this label along with the other studio albums from his back catalogue. The re-issue featured a changed track-list: "Jeepster" was removed, two other cover versions were added, "The Seeker" by The Who and "Time and a Word" by Yes, which had previously been released on the compilation Outpatients '93. "Time and A Word" was also part of the compilation Yin (1995).

== Charts ==
Country	Peak position
Switzerland	30
Germany	44
Netherlands	16
United Kingdom	46

== Track listing ==
No.	Title	Writer(s)	Original Artist	Length
1.	"Question"	Justin Hayward	The Moody Blues	6:41
2.	"Boston Tea Party"	Alex Harvey, Hugh McKenna, Zal Cleminson	Sensational Alex Harvey Band	4:22
3.	"Fearless"	David Gilmour, Roger Waters	Pink Floyd	6:15
4.	"Apeman"	Ray Davies	The Kinks	5:57
5.	"Hold Your Head Up"	Rod Argent, Chris White	Argent	3:47
6.	"Solo"	Sandy Denny	Sandy Denny	4:46
7.	"I Know What I Like"	Tony Banks, Phil Collins, Peter Gabriel, Steve Hackett, Mike Rutherford	Genesis	4:17
8.	"Jeepster" (Not included on 1998 remastered edition)	Marc Bolan	T. Rex	4:10
9.	"Five Years"	David Bowie	David Bowie	5:19

1998 Remastered edition
No.	Title	Writer(s)	Original Artist	Length
1.	"Question"			6:41
2.	"Boston Tea Party"			4:22
3.	"Fearless"			6:15
4.	"Apeman"			5:57
5.	"Hold Your Head Up"			3:47
6.	"I Know What I Like (In Your Wardrobe)"			4:17
7.	"Solo"			4:46
8.	"Time and a Word"	Jon Anderson, David Foster	Yes	4:24
9.	"The Seeker"	Townshend	The Who	3:16
10.	"Five Years"			5:19

=== 2017 The Remasters edition ===
Disc 1
No.	Title	Writer(s)	Original Artist	Length
1.	"Question"			6:41
2.	"Boston Tea Party"			4:22
3.	"Fearless"			6:15
4.	"Apeman"			5:57
5.	"Hold Your Head Up"			3:47
6.	"I Know What I Like (In Your Wardrobe)"			4:17
7.	"Solo"			4:46
8.	"Jeepster"			4:10
9.	"Time and a Word"			4:24
10.	"The Seeker"			3:16
11.	"Five Years"			5:19
12.	"Caledonia"	Dougie MacLean	Alan Roberts and Dougie MacLean	4:20

Disc 2
No.	Title	Writer(s)	Recording source	Length
1.	"Something in the Air (Live Hamburg 1992)"	Speedy Keen		5:59
2.	"I Know What I Like ('93 Demos)"			3:16
3.	"The Seeker ('93 Demos)"			3:17
4.	"Fearless (Live Utrecht 1993)"		Sushi	6:49
5.	"Boston Tea Party (Live Utrecht 1993)"		Sushi	4:13
6.	"Jeepster (Live Utrecht 1993)"		Sushi	3:54
7.	"Hold Your Head Up (Live Utrecht 1993)"		Sushi	3:08
8.	"Five Years (Live Utrecht 1993)"		Sushi	7:58
9.	"Roadhouse Blues (Live Acoustic Duisberg 1994)"	Jim Morrison, Robbie Krieger, Ray Manzarek, John Densmore		7:30
10.	"Jeepster (Live Acoustic Duisberg 1994)"			5:35
11.	"Solo (Live Acoustic Krakow 1995)"		Acoustic Sessions	5:19
12.	"Boston Tea Party (with SAHB 1995)"			4:57
13.	"Faith Healer (Live NEARFest USA 2008)"	Alex Harvey, Hugh McKenna		6:24

Disc Three: DVD

1. "Reflections - A look back at ‘Songs from the Mirror’. A film by David Barras and Scott MacKay" – 1:29:08
2. "Fearless" – 7:10
3. "Boston Tea Party" – 4:12
4. "Jeepster / Hold Your Head Up" – 4:04
5. "Five Years" – 7:48
6. "Hold Your Head Up" (video) – 3:31
7. "Solo (Cropredy Festival, 2015)" – 6:38

== Personnel ==
From original release liner notes:

- Derek W. Dick (Fish) – lead vocals
- Foster Paterson – keyboards, backing vocals
- Gaëtan Shurrer – additional programming (1, 2, 4, 7, 8)
- Robin Boult – guitars, backing vocals
- Frank Usher – guitars
- David Paton – bass, backing vocals
- Kevin Wilkinson – drums, percussion
- Ben Molleson – fiddle (6, 8), whistle (6, 8)
- Danny Campbell – backing vocals (2–7, 9)
- Lorna Bannon – backing vocals (3, 5–7, 9)
- Jackie Bird – backing vocals (3, 6, 9)
- The "Harmony" Choir – additional backing vocals (9)

Special effects and background voices

- David Bogie – lawnmower
- Caroline Boult – party invitation
- Mick Wall – answering machine
- Haddington Bear – Zippo
- Mr Samples – Native Americans
- Glasgow Barrowland Company Ensemble – "Geezabun" Choir

Additional musicians (2017 Reissue)

- Steve Howe – guitars ("Time and a Word")
- Hugh McKenna – keyboards ("Caledonia")
- Zal Cleminson – guitars ("Caledonia")
- Brian Robertson – guitars ("Caledonia")
- Ted McKenna – drums ("Caledonia")
- Mary Kiani – backing vocals ("Caledonia")

=== Production ===
- James Cassidy – producer, recording, mixing
- David Bogie – assistant engineer
- Peacock Mastering & Design – sleeve design, graphics
- Keith McIntyre – cover illustration
- Brian Lane – management
