= Field of Crows =

- Cover art by Mark Wilkinson

Studio album by Fish
- Released: 10 December 2003 (mail-order); 25 May 2004 (retail)
- Recorded: 2003
- Genre: Progressive rock
- Length: 66:58
- Label: Chocolate Frog Records; Snapper Music
- Producer: Elliot Ness

Fish chronology
Fellini Days (2001)	Field of Crows (2003)	Bouillabaisse (2005)

Professional ratings
Review scores
Source	Rating
Allmusic	4/5 stars

Field of Crows is Fish's eighth solo studio album (seventh of original material) since he left Marillion in 1988 and the first since Fellini Days (2001). Released on Fish's own label Chocolate Frog Records, retail distribution is now handled by Snapper Music.

== Track listing ==
No.	Title	Length
1.	"The Field" (Derek Dick, Bruce Watson)	8:42
2.	"Moving Targets" (Derek Dick, Bruce Watson, Irvin Duguid)	5:46
3.	"The Rookie" (Derek Dick, Bruce Watson)	5:35
4.	"Zoo Class" (Derek Dick, Bruce Watson, Irvin Duguid)	5:23
5.	"The Lost Plot" (Derek Dick, Tony Turrell)	5:10
6.	"Old Crow" (Derek Dick, Bruce Watson, Irvin Duguid)	5:20
7.	"Numbers" (Derek Dick, Bruce Watson, Frank Usher)	5:36
8.	"Exit Wound" (Derek Dick, Bruce Watson)	5:55
9.	"Innocent Party" (Derek Dick, Bruce Watson, Irvin Duguid)	7:37
10.	"Shot The Craw" (Derek Dick, Bruce Watson, Irvin Duguid)	6:00
11.	"Scattering Crows (Still Time)" (Derek Dick, Bruce Watson, Tony Turrell, Irvin Duguid)	5:05

=== 2016 The Remasters edition ===
Disc 1: Original Studio Album
No.	Title	Length
1.	"The Field"	8:42
2.	"Moving Targets"	5:46
3.	"The Rookie"	5:35
4.	"Zoo Class"	5:23
5.	"The Lost Plot"	5:10
6.	"Old Crow"	5:20
7.	"Numbers"	5:36
8.	"Exit Wound"	5:55
9.	"Innocent Party"	7:37
10.	"Shot The Craw"	6:00
11.	"Scattering Crows (Still Time)"	5:05

Disc 2: Demo's & Live
No.	Title	Source	Length
1.	"The Lost Plot (Demo)"		6:20
2.	"Scattering Crows (Demo)"		4:59
3.	"The Field (Demo)"		8:46
4.	"The Rookie (Live 2004)"	Scattering Crows	5:41
5.	"Moving Targets (Live 2004)"	Scattering Crows	6:14
6.	"Innocent Party (Live 2004)"	Scattering Crows	6:46
7.	"Zoo Class (Live 2004)"	Scattering Crows	5:06
8.	"Numbers (Live 2004)"	Scattering Crows	5:55
9.	"Old Crow (Live 2004)"		5:34
10.	"The Lost Plot (Live 2004)"		6:18

Disc 3: Live
No.	Title	Source	Length
1.	"The Field (Live Acoustic 2006)"	Communion	8:19
2.	"Shot The Craw (Live Acoustic 2006)"	Communion	5:23
3.	"The Lost Plot (Live Acoustic 2006)"	Communion	4:53
4.	"Scattering Crows (Live Acoustic Version 2006)"	Communion	5:22
5.	"Innocent Party (Live 2005)"	Return to Childhood	5:08
6.	"Moving Targets (Live 2005)"	Return to Childhood	7:08
7.	"The Rookie (Live 2004)"	Scattering Crows	5:56
8.	"Zoo Class (Live 2004)"	Scattering Crows	5:01
9.	"Numbers (Live 2004)"	Scattering Crows	5:36
10.	"Moving Targets (Live 2004)"	Scattering Crows	5:42
11.	"Innocent Party (Live 2004)"	Scattering Crows	7:08

== Personnel ==
- Fish (Derek W. Dick) – lead vocals
- Bruce Watson – guitars and e-bow
- Frank Usher – guitars, slide guitar
- Steve Vantsis – bass
- Mark Brzezicki – drums and percussion
- Tony Turrell – keyboards
- Dave Haswell – percussion
- Danny Gillan – backing vocals on 1,2,3,4,6,11
- Richard Sidwell – trumpet and flugel horn on 1,4,6,8,10
- Steve Hamilton – saxophone on 1,4,6,8,10
- Yatta, Lars K. Lande – "crowd" vocal on 1
- Irvin Duguid - clavinet on 6

== Production ==
- Calum Malcolm – mastering
- Elliot Ness – producer, engineer, mixing
- Geoff Allan – assistant engineer
- Dave Axtell – artwork, design
- Mark Wilkinson – portraits
- Lars K. Lande – inside back photo
