= Fellini Days =

- Cover art by Mark Wilkinson

Studio album by Fish
- Released: 2 May 2001 (mail-order); 13 August 2001 (retail)
- Recorded: 2001
- Genre: Neo-progressive rock
- Length: 57:07 (album); 63:00 (companion disc)
- Label: Chocolate Frog Records; Snapper Music
- Producer: Elliot Ness

Fish chronology
Raingods with Zippos (1999)	Fellini Days (2001)	Field of Crows (2004)

Companion CD cover
- Cover of the companion CD

Professional ratings
Review scores
Source	Rating
AllMusic	3/5 stars
Kerrang!	4/5 stars

Fellini Days is Fish's seventh solo studio album (sixth of original material) since leaving Marillion in 1988, his first since Raingods with Zippos (1999) and the first on his own label Chocolate Frog Records.

"Having long ago cast into exile the ghosts of prog rock, Fish ushers guitars and female singers to the fore," observed Classic Rock, "and blends his trademark poetry into the spacious but claustrophobic, almost Waitsian '3D', the blues rock weight of 'Long Cold Day' and the gathering dramas of 'Tiki 4', 'The Pilgrim's Address' and the slowly creeping 'Clock Moves Sideways'."

== Track listing ==
No.	Title	Length
1.	"3D" (Dick/Wes Dearth/John Young)	9:11
2.	"So Fellini" (Dick/Wes Dearth)	4:06
3.	"Tiki 4" (Dick/Wes Dearth/John Young)	7:32
4.	"Our Smile" (Dick/Wes Dearth/John Young)	5:25
5.	"Long Cold Day" (Dick/Wes Dearth/John Young)	5:33
6.	"Dancing in Fog" (Dick/Wes Dearth/John Young)	5:30
7.	"Obligatory Ballad" (Dick/Wes Dearth)	5:15
8.	"The Pilgrim's Address" (Dick/Wes Dearth)	7:18
9.	"Clock Moves Sideways" (Dick/Wes Dearth)	7:17

Bonus "Companion Disc"
No.	Title	Length
1.	"3D (live in Rotterdam 10/5/01)"
2.	"So Fellini (live in Poznan 31/05/01)"
3.	"Tiki 4 (live in Oslo 18/05/01)"
4.	"Pilgrim's Address (live in Oslo 18/05/01)"
5.	"Clock Moves Sideways (live in Oslo 18/05/01)"
6.	"Dancing In Fog (History Of Guns remix)"
7.	"Obligatory Ballad (Spaced Out remix)"
8.	"Clock Moves Sideways (Two Clocks in One Whole remix)"
9.	"Our Smile (Acoustic Version)"

=== 2015 The Remasters edition ===
Disc 1: Original studio album
No.	Title	Length
1.	"3D"	9:11
2.	"So Fellini"	4:06
3.	"Tiki 4"	7:32
4.	"Our Smile"	5:25
5.	"Long Cold Day"	5:33
6.	"Dancing in Fog"	5:30
7.	"Obligatory Ballad"	5:15
8.	"The Pilgrim's Address"	7:18
9.	"Clock Moves Sideways"	7:17

Disc 2: Demos
No.	Title	Length
1.	"3D"	9:36
2.	"So Fellini"	2:56
3.	"So Fellini"	4:38
4.	"Aggro"	4:34
5.	"Clock Moves Sideways"	5:00
6.	"Tiki 4"	2:14
7.	"Tiki 4"	4:52
8.	"Long Cold Day"	5:00
9.	"End Of The Line"	3:14
10.	"Federico"	4:00
11.	"The Pilgrim's Address"	3:38
12.	"Our Smile"	5:28
13.	"Dancing In Fog"	6:17

Disc 3: Radio Edits & Live
No.	Title	Length
1.	"3D (Live Rotterdam 2001)"	8:55
2.	"So Fellini (Nearfest 2008)"	4:25
3.	"Long Cold Day (Tilburg 2005)"	6:26
4.	"The Pilgrim's Address (Oslo 2001)"	8:40
5.	"Clock Moves Sideways (Amsterdam 2001)"	7:27
6.	"Our Smile (Acoustic, Leamington 2012)"	7:19
7.	"Tiki 4 (Oslo 2001)"	7:51
8.	"Clock Moves Sideways (Oslo 2001)"	7:32
9.	"So Fellini (Poznan 2001)"	3:59
10.	"The Pilgrim's Address (Haddington 2006)"	9:40

== Personnel ==
Recorded at The Studio, Haddington, East Lothian, Scotland with additional recordings taken from sessions at The Grand Hotel, Pristina, Kosovo and live recordings from Leeuwarden, Utrecht and Oberhausen. Recorded, engineered and produced by Elliot Ness. Mixed by Calum Malcolm and Elliot Ness. Mastered by Calum Malcolm.

- Lead vocals: Fish
- Guitars: John Wesley
- Keyboards: John Young
- Bass: Steve Vantsis
- Drums: Dave Stewart
- Backing Vocals: Susie Webb and Zoe Nicholas
- Percussion: Dave Haswell

Loop programming Eric DeWolf

Bonus disc credits: Engineered, recorded, mixed and produced by Elliot Ness. Mastered by Dallas Simpson at Serendipity.

- Drums: John Marter (1–5)
- Bass: Steve Barnacle (1–5)
- Keyboards: John Young (1/4/5/6)
- Jim Heyden (2)
- Max Rael (6/7/8)
- Vocals: Fish
- B-Vocals: Susie Webb and Zoe Nicholas (3/5/9)
- Programming: Max Rael (6/7/8)
- Loops: Courtesy of Amg (6/7/8)
- Guitars: John Wesley.
