= Soultans =

- Origin: Germany
- Genres: R&B
- Years active: 1996-present
- Labels: Coconut Records

Soultans is an all-male R&B band notable predominantly in Europe, but also for signing on for a short contract with BMG. The Soultans originally consisted of three members and is based in Germany, although two of its members have English ties. The group resides under the German label, Coconut Records, which has also kick-started other small bands' careers. The lead vocalist, Marvin Broadie, and musician Marco Boi, were later replaced by Sascha van Haasen and Mike Marshall in 2002.

Although the band suggested its inspirations as 1970's music, Soultans has added elements of hip hop, jazz and soul to their music, following in the lines of Londonbeat, another English band. The group is most notable for its popular 1996 songs, "Can't take my hands off you" and "I Heard It Through the Grapevine". The band released two albums in the 1990s, Love, Sweat and Tears in 1997 which reached #2 in Denmark, and Take Off in 1998. The band released another three in the new millennium with the albums Tribute to Soul with BMG in 2001, Hit Collection 1 and Hit Collection 2 in 2005 with Coconut, before re-releasing many of their songs on the album Can't Take My Hands off You in 2005.

Their most recent CD release was in September 2007, with The Very Best of Soult, which compiles their earlier work.

Australian-based singer/songwriter/vocal coach Scott Winter, of Spanish descent, joined the band after Marco Boi left in 1996. Scott wrote three songs on the Soultans second album Take Off and stayed with the group for three years touring Europe, recording throughout. Scott "Bradley" Winter is the first cousin of Amanda Ghost, President of Epic Records and Ivor Novello award-winning songwriter.

== Charts ==
=== Singles ===
"Can't take my hands off you"

Chart (1996)	Peak position
Austrian Singles Chart	12
Swedish Singles Chart	15
Swiss Singles Chart	15

"I Heard It Through the Grapevine"

Chart (1997)	Peak position
Austrian Singles Chart	24
New Zealand Singles Chart	44

=== Albums ===
"Love, Sweat and Tears"

Chart (1997)	Peak position
Austrian Charts	22
Denmark Charts	2
Swedish Charts	42
Swiss Charts	42
