= Raingods with Zippos =

Studio album by Fish
- Released: 19 April 1999
- Genre: Progressive rock
- Length: 54:24
- Label: Roadrunner
- Producer: Elliot Ness

Fish chronology
Kettle of Fish (1997)	Raingods with Zippos (1999)	Fellini Days (2001)

Professional ratings
Review scores
Source	Rating
All About Jazz	4/5 stars
AllMusic	4/5 stars

Raingods with Zippos is a 1999 progressive rock album by ex-Marillion vocalist Fish. It was released on the Roadrunner record label, more well known for its heavy metal releases. Raingods with Zippos is often hailed as one of Fish's greatest solo achievements, along with his 1990 debut Vigil in a Wilderness of Mirrors. It is the first of three Fish albums to be produced by Elliot Ness (not including the "best of" collection Kettle of Fish from 1998, with which Ness was involved). While he was not involved with the production of this album, Steven Wilson, most famous for his work with Porcupine Tree, played guitar on several of the tracks.

== Critical reception ==
Glenn Astarita of All About Jazz called it "refreshing, wonderfully produced and an audiophile's treat" and "about class as all the material presented here holds its own after repeated listens. Fish sings with conviction while displaying a gutsy attitude that exudes sheer power and determination."

== Track listing ==
No.	Title	Writer(s)	Length
1.	"Tumbledown"	Derek W. Dick, Mickey Simmonds	5:52
2.	"Mission Statement"	Dick, Rick Astley, Paul Thorn	4:00
3.	"Incomplete"	Dick, Elisabeth Antwi, Doug Millet	3:44
4.	"Tilted Cross"	Dick, Jackson, Chris Johnson	4:19
5.	"Faith Healer"	Alex Harvey, Hugh McKenna	5:01
6.	"Rites of Passage"	Dick, Simmonds	7:42
7.	"Plague of Ghosts: (I) Old Haunts"	Dick, Tony Turrell, Mark Daghorn	3:13
8.	"Plague of Ghosts: (II) Digging Deep"	Dick, Turrell, Daghorn	6:49
9.	"Plague of Ghosts: (III) Chocolate Frogs"	Dick, Turrell, Daghorn	4:04
10.	"Plague of Ghosts: (IV) Waving at Stars"	Dick, Turrell, Daghorn	3:12
11.	"Plague of Ghosts: (V) Raingods Dancing"	Dick, Turrell, Daghorn	4:16
12.	"Plague of Ghosts: (VI) Wake-Up Call (Make It Happen)"	Dick, Turrell, Daghorn	3:32

=== 2015 The Remasters edition ===
Disc 1: Original studio album
No.	Title	Length
1.	"Tumbledown"	5:52
2.	"Mission Statement"	4:00
3.	"Incomplete"	3:44
4.	"Tilted Cross"	4:19
5.	"Faith Healer"	5:01
6.	"Rites of Passage"	7:42
7.	"Plague of Ghosts: (I) Old Haunts"	3:13
8.	"Plague of Ghosts: (II) Digging Deep"	6:49
9.	"Plague of Ghosts: (III) Chocolate Frogs"	4:04
10.	"Plague of Ghosts: (IV) Waving at Stars"	3:12
11.	"Plague of Ghosts: (V) Raingods Dancing"	4:16
12.	"Plague of Ghosts: (VI) Wake-Up Call (Make It Happen)"	3:32

Disc 2: Plague Of Ghosts Variations
No.	Title	Length
1.	"Plague of Ghosts (live studio instrumental pre-production)"	23:04
2.	"Plague of Ghosts (Tony Turrell Instrumental Demo)"	14:21
3.	"Plague of Ghosts (From "Sashimi" Live In Poznan, Poland 1999)"	28:43

Disc 3: Live + Bonus Tracks & Demos
No.	Title	Recording source	Length
1.	"Incomplete (Acoustic Demo with Elisabeth Troy)"	Previously unreleased	3:41
2.	"Chasing Miss Pretty (Studio Version)"	Kettle of Fish	4:52
3.	"Mr. Buttons (Studio Version)"	Kettle of Fish	4:36
4.	"Tilted Cross"	Communion	4:23
5.	"Incomplete"	Communion	4:06
6.	"Rite Of Passage"	Communion	5:58
7.	"Tumbledown"	Candlelight in Fog	5:35
8.	"Plague Of Ghosts"	Candlelight in Fog	34:22

== Personnel ==
- Fish (Derek W. Dick) – all vocals
- Steven Wilson – guitars (tracks 1, 5, 7, 8–12)
- Bruce Watson – guitars (1 and 2); mandolin (3)
- Robin Boult – guitars (2–5)
- Till Paulmann – guitars (2)
- Phil Grieve – guitars (5)
- Steve Vantsis – bass guitars (1, 2, 5–12); double bass (3 and 4)
- Tony Turrell – keyboards (1, 5, 7–11 and 12); piano (2); organ (2); harmonium (3 and 4); synths (4); programming (7–12); string arrangements (5); samples (7–12)
- Mickey Simmonds – keyboards (5 and 6); piano (1); programming (6)
- Dave Stewart – drums (1, 2, 4–12)
- Davey Crichton – violin (5); fiddle (4); string arrangements (3, 5–12)
- Dave Haswell – percussion (all tracks)
- Elisabeth Antwi – lead vocals (3); backing vocals (1)
- Nicola King – backing vocals (2, 4, 7–12)
- Tony King – backing vocals (2, 7–12)
- Mo Warden – spoken outro vocal (12)
- Mark Daghorn – programming (7–12)
- Elliot Ness – string arrangements (3, 5 and 6); samples (7–12)

== Charts ==
Chart performance for Raingods with Zippos
Chart (1999)	Peak position
Dutch Albums (Album Top 100)	35
German Albums (Offizielle Top 100)	34
Scottish Albums (OCC)	41
UK Albums (OCC)	57
