= Mark Wilkinson =

British artist and illustrator of album covers

- Born: 3 October 1952 (age 74); Windsor, Berkshire, England
- Known for: Album covers, comics, illustration

Mark Wilkinson (born 3 October 1952) is an English illustrator. He is best known for the detailed surrealistic cover art he created for a number of British bands.

Wilkinson's breakthrough came through his association with the neo-prog band Marillion in the 1980s. He went on to design art for the subsequent solo career of their lead singer, Fish, as well as bands such as Judas Priest and Iron Maiden. Though versed in a number of techniques, he is considered to be a master of the airbrush.

In 2012, his sleeve for the 1984 Marillion album Fugazi was chosen by Gigwise as the 29th greatest album artwork of all time. In 2015, Wilkinson designed the artwork for the Tya Brewery in Øvre Årdal, Norway.

== Biography ==
Wilkinson was inspired by 1960s artists such as Hapshash and the Coloured Coat (a collaboration between Michael English and Nigel Waymouth) and Rick Griffin.

Wilkinson's break came with his designs for Marillion in the 1980s, who were then second only to Iron Maiden in terms of their sales of T-shirts and merchandise. Wilkinson's first artistic creation for Marillion was the cover of their debut 12" EP Market Square Heroes (1982). Subsequently, Wilkinson's art work would be used on all of Marillion's albums and 12" releases through The Thieving Magpie (1988). When Fish left the band Wilkinson went with him, providing the artwork for many of his albums and singles; aside from compilations, Songs from the Mirror is the only studio album by Fish not to feature cover art by Wilkinson. In 1997, he collaborated with Bill Smith Studios (which had replaced him as Marillion's official art group) on the Best of Both Worlds compilation CD. The compilation included songs from the eras of the band with and without Fish, and the record label, EMI, decided it should also include artwork reflective of both eras. In 2000, Fish and Wilkinson collaborated on a book, Masque, which, in "back and forth" format, described the process by which the Fish and Marillion album covers were created. Wilkinson will likely always be most closely identified with Fish and Marillion (in a similar fashion to Roger Dean's association with Yes or Paul Whitehead's association with Genesis).

Wilkinson's work for Marillion gained attention and led to him designing Monsters of Rock posters. This in turn brought him to the attention of heavy metal band Judas Priest. He has named "The Four Horsemen" from Judas Priest's 2008 album Nostradamus as the work he is most pleased with. The 1992 Monsters of Rock poster featuring a winged version of the Iron Maiden mascot Eddie was reused by the band in their album Live at Donington, and Wilkinson would do more work for the group such as the covers of the studio albums The Book of Souls and Senjutsu. He has designed miscellaneous pieces for Bon Jovi, Jimmy Page, the Who and Kylie Minogue. Outside of the music community, he has also done numerous book covers, advertisements, comic art (including a 1993 Judge Anderson episode in the Judge Dredd Megazine) and commissioned pieces.

== Partial list of works ==
=== Album covers ===
==== Marillion ====
- Script for a Jester's Tear
- Fugazi
- Real to Reel
- Misplaced Childhood
- Clutching at Straws
- The Thieving Magpie

==== Fish ====
- Vigil in a Wilderness of Mirrors
- Internal Exile
- Suits
- Sunsets on Empire
- Raingods with Zippos
- Fellini Days
- Field of Crows
- 13th Star
- A Feast of Consequences
- Weltschmerz

==== Judas Priest ====
- Ram It Down
- Painkiller
- Jugulator
- Angel of Retribution
- Nostradamus
- Redeemer of Souls
- Invincible Shield

==== Iron Maiden ====
- Live at Donington (1998 remastered version)
- Best of the 'B' Sides (2002 compilation)
- The Book of Souls
- Senjutsu

=== Comics ===
- Judge Anderson: "Voyage of the Seeker" (with Alan Grant, in Judge Dredd Megazine, 2.37, 1993)

==== Comics covers ====
- Judge Dredd Megazine #2.10, 2.15, 2.20, 2.27, 2.30, 2.32, 2.37, 2.48, 2.50, 2.63, 3.04 (1992–1995)
