= Internal Exile (Fish album) =

- Cover art by Mark Wilkinson

Studio album by Fish
- Released: 28 October 1991
- Studio: Millennium Recording Studios (Haddington)
- Genre: Progressive rock
- Length: 50:14 (original CD); 61:05 (remastered editions); 45:06 (vinyl)
- Label: Polydor
- Producer: Chris Kimsey

Fish chronology
Vigil in a Wilderness of Mirrors (1990)	Internal Exile (1991)	Songs from the Mirror (1993)

Alternative cover
- Artwork on 1992 PolyGram U.S. release

Singles from Internal Exile
- 1. "Internal Exile" Released: 9 September 1991; 2. "Credo" Released: 23 December 1991; 3. "Something in the Air" Released: 22 June 1992

Professional ratings
Review scores
Source	Rating
Allmusic	3/5 stars

Internal Exile ("A Collection of a Boy's Own Stories") is Fish's second solo album after leaving Marillion in 1988. The album, released 28 October 1991, was inspired by the singer's past, his own personal problems and his troubled experiences with his previous record label EMI.

The album's music reflects Fish's indulgence in the vast regions of music that he wanted to explore as a solo artist; most notably Celtic music and folk styles. The album also has many concert staples such as "Credo", "Tongues" and "Internal Exile" featuring on a number of Fish's official bootleg recordings.

As on Vigil, Fish deals with themes important to him. The song "Internal Exile" speaks of his strong national pride and his desire for independence for Scotland. "Credo" is another song dealing with social problems and globalisation, echoing "State of Mind", his first solo single.

The album was produced by Chris Kimsey, and dedicated to Fish's daughter Tara.

== Re-releases ==
A remastered version was released by Roadrunner Records on 26 October 1998.

In 2024, a deluxe edition of Internal Exile was released on Chocolate Frog Records as a 3CD digibook, a 4CD/Blu-ray set, and a 2LP boxed version. The deluxe edition includes a new remix and remaster by Calum Malcolm, (with the two additional tracks properly inserted into the album as intended) as well as, on the Blu-ray disc, new Dolby Atmos and 5.1 surround mixes by Avril Mackintosh and Andy Bradfield, documentaries and promotional videos. The set also includes a disc of album demos, 2 discs of live material at various venues from previously released live albums.

== Track listing ==
No.	Title	Writer(s)	Length
1.	"Shadowplay"	Dick, Mickey Simmonds	6:23
2.	"Credo"	Dick, Simmonds, Robin Boult, Frank Usher	6:40
3.	"Just Good Friends (Close)"	Dick, Usher, Boult, Simmonds	6:00
4.	"Favourite Stranger"	Dick, Usher	5:58
5.	"Lucky"	Dick, Boult, Simmonds	4:50
6.	"Dear Friend"	Dick, Boult, Simmonds	4:08
7.	"Tongues"	Dick, Simmonds, Usher, Boult	6:22
8.	"Internal Exile"	Dick, Boult, Simmonds	4:45
9.	"Something in the Air" (Track missing from Vinyl release)	Speedy Keen	5:08

1998 Remaster Bonus Tracks
No.	Title	Writer(s)	Length
10.	"Poet's Moon"	Dick, Simmonds, Boult, Usher	4:26
11.	"Carnival Man"	Dick, Boult, Ted McKenna, Simmonds, Usher, David Paton	6:25

=== 3-CD, 2024, Remastered/Remixed, Digi-Book ===
Disc 1: 2024 Remix by Calum Malcolm
No.	Title	Length
1.	"Shadowplay"	6:29
2.	"Lucky"	5:01
3.	"Just Good Friends (Close)"	5:57
4.	"Favourite Stranger"	5:58
5.	"Tongues"	6:34
6.	"Something In The Air"	5:10
7.	"Poet's Moon"	4:23
8.	"Dear Friend"	4:11
9.	"Credo"	6:39
10.	"Internal Exile"	4:44
11.	"Carnival Man"	6:28

Disc 2: Demos
No.	Title	Length
1.	"Lucky (Demo)"	5:04
2.	"Favourite Stranger (Demo)"	6:04
3.	"Tongues (Demo)"	6:26
4.	"Credo (Demo Guitar Version)"	6:52
5.	"Dear Friend (Demo/Jam)"	10:08
6.	"Poets Moon (Demo)"	5:14
7.	"Internal Exile ('89 Demo)"	5:12
8.	"Dear Friend (Demo)"	3:36
9.	"Shadowplay (Demo)"	5:44
10.	"Favourite Stranger (Demo)"	3:05
11.	"Just Good Friends (Instrumental Demo)"	5:20

Disc 3: Studio & Live Versions
No.	Title	Recording source	Length
1.	"Credo"	Yin & Yang	6:45
2.	"Just Good Friends (with Sam Brown)"	Yin & Yang	5:49
3.	"Lucky"	Yin & Yang	4:58
4.	"Favourite Stranger"	Yin & Yang	7:07
5.	"Shadowplay"	Uncle Fish and the Crypt Keepers	6:31
6.	"Credo"	Uncle Fish and the Crypt Keepers	7:15
7.	"Lucky"	Uncle Fish and the Crypt Keepers	5:02
8.	"Tongues"	Uncle Fish and the Crypt Keepers	6:23
9.	"Dear Friend"	Uncle Fish and the Crypt Keepers	4:14
10.	"Internal Exile"	Uncle Fish and the Crypt Keepers	4:46
11.	"Poets Moon"	Sushi	4:12
12.	"Just Good Friends"	Sushi	6:17
13.	"Favourite Stranger"	Communion	5:50

=== 4-CD + Blu-ray Disc, 2024, Remastered/Remixed, Digi-Book ===
Disc 1: 2024 Remix by Calum Malcolm
No.	Title	Length
1.	"Shadowplay"	6:29
2.	"Lucky"	5:01
3.	"Just Good Friends (Close)"	5:57
4.	"Favourite Stranger"	5:58
5.	"Tongues"	6:34
6.	"Something In The Air"	5:10
7.	"Poet's Moon"	4:23
8.	"Dear Friend"	4:11
9.	"Credo"	6:39
10.	"Internal Exile"	4:44
11.	"Carnival Man"	6:28

Disc 2: Demos
No.	Title	Length
1.	"Lucky (Demo)"	5:04
2.	"Favourite Stranger (Demo)"	6:04
3.	"Tongues (Demo)"	6:26
4.	"Credo (Demo Guitar Version)"	6:52
5.	"Dear Friend (Demo/Jam)"	10:08
6.	"Poets Moon (Demo)"	5:14
7.	"Internal Exile ('89 Demo)"	5:12
8.	"Dear Friend (Demo)"	3:36
9.	"Shadowplay (Demo)"	5:44
10.	"Favourite Stranger (Demo)"	3:05
11.	"Just Good Friends (Instrumental Demo)"	5:20

Disc 3: Studio & Live Versions
No.	Title	Recording source	Length
1.	"Credo"	Yin & Yang	6:45
2.	"Just Good Friends (with Sam Brown)"	Yin & Yang	5:49
3.	"Lucky"	Yin & Yang	4:58
4.	"Favourite Stranger"	Yin & Yang	7:07
5.	"Internal Exile"	The Complete BBC Sessions	4:42
6.	"Tongues"	The Complete BBC Sessions	5:59
7.	"Credo"	The Complete BBC Sessions	7:05
8.	"Lucky"	Sushi	4:59
9.	"Poets Moon"	Sushi	4:12
10.	"Just Good Friends"	Sushi	6:17
11.	"Internal Exile"	Sushi	4:42
12.	"Credo"	Sushi	7:04

Disc 4: Live Versions
No.	Title	Recording source	Length
1.	"Shadowplay"	Uncle Fish and the Crypt Keepers	6:31
2.	"Credo"	Uncle Fish and the Crypt Keepers	7:15
3.	"Lucky"	Uncle Fish and the Crypt Keepers	5:02
4.	"Tongues"	Uncle Fish and the Crypt Keepers	6:23
5.	"Dear Friend"	Uncle Fish and the Crypt Keepers	4:14
6.	"Internal Exile"	Uncle Fish and the Crypt Keepers	4:46
7.	"Favourite Stranger"	Communion	5:50
8.	"Just Good Friends"	Communion	6:02
9.	"Lucky"	Fortunes of War	6:06
10.	"Dear Friend"	Fortunes of War	4:01
11.	"Shadowplay"	For Whom The Bells Toll!	6:46
12.	"Internal Exile"	Sunsets On Empire: Live in Poland 1997	5:01

Blu-ray Disc

1. Internal Exile 2024 Remix - Dolby Atmos and 5.1 mixes
2. "The Art Of Internal Exile" Documentary Film
3. Credo Promo Video
4. Just Good Friends Promo Video
5. Internal Exile Promo Video
6. 'Uncle Fish and The Crypt Keepers' Dusseldorf Phillips Halle 7/12/1991 Full Concert Audio
7. 'Derek Dick and his Amazing Electric Bear' Haddington Corn Exchange 3/11/91 Full Concert Audio

== Personnel ==
- Lead Vocal: Derek W Dick (Fish)
- Keyboards: Mickey Simmonds
- Guitars: Robin Boult & Frank Usher
- Bass Guitar: David Paton
- Drums and percussion: Ethan Johns except "Tongues" & "Internal Exile" Ted McKenna
- Male Backing Vocals: David Paton, Mr Crimson, Robin Boult
- Female Backing Vocals: Maryen Cairns
- Fiddle on "Internal Exile": Charlie McKerron
- Whistles: Marc Duff
- Box Accordion: Donald Shaw

== Charts ==
Country	Peak position
Netherlands	59
Switzerland	30
United Kingdom	21
