= Mickey Simmonds =

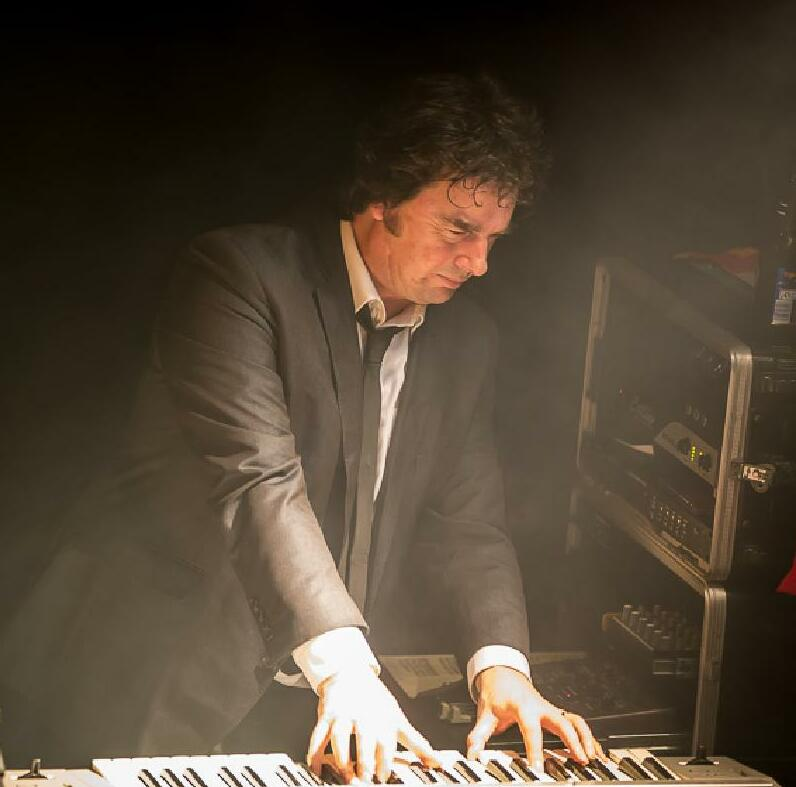
- Simmonds performing in 2016

Background information
- Born: Michael John Simmonds; 31 January 1959 (age 67); Chesterfield, Derbyshire, England
- Genres: Progressive rock
- Occupations: Keyboardist, composer
- Instrument: Keyboards
- Years active: 1970s–present
- Website: Mickey Simmonds

Mickey Simmonds (born 31 January 1959) is an English session keyboardist, arranger and composer. He is best known for his work with progressive rock acts, Mike Oldfield, Renaissance, Camel and Fish. He has also worked with Joan Armatrading, Paul Young, The Rutles, Art Garfunkel, Kiki Dee, Mastermind, John Coghlan's Diesel Band, Elkie Brooks, Judie Tzuke, Imagination, Bucks Fizz, Jennifer Rush and The Bonzo Dog Doo-Dah Band, among others.

== Career ==
Simmonds has released three solo albums, The Shape of Rain (1996), The Seven Colours of Emptiness (2007) and Mickey Simmonds III (2021) which he describes as "a small homage to the late great Keith Emerson, sadly missed by me". He has also released Variations on Melodies of Mike Oldfield (2000), Lord of the Rings – The Two Towers (music inspired by) (2002), Lord of the Rings – Return of the King (music inspired by) (2004) and Bach for Dinner (unknown date)

Simmonds played on two albums: Islands (1987), and Heaven's Open (1991); one compilation: The Complete Mike Oldfield (1985), and toured with Mike 1983 -1993.

Having at one time been considered as a replacement for Mark Kelly in Marillion by the band's then-singer Fish, Simmonds was later chosen as the dominant co-writer on Fish's 1990 solo debut Vigil in a Wilderness of Mirrors. He also co-wrote all tracks on the follow-up album Internal Exile and performed on the tours promoting these albums. Fish described him as the musical director of his early solo years. He left in 1992, but later returned for the tour promoting Sunsets on Empire (1997) and co-wrote two and performed on three tracks on Raingods with Zippos (1999).

Simmonds had a long-standing relationship with Neil Innes, hence The Rutles (including all the arrangements on Archaeology 1996) and The Bonzo Dog Doo-Dah Band, whose studio album Pour l'Amour des Chiens was co-produced by Simmonds & Innes.

Simmonds toured with Camel during the tour following the Dust and Dreams album release in 1992 (which had featured Ton Scherpenzeel on keyboards), performances of which appeared on the Camel live album Never Let Go (1993); he also played on the subsequent studio album Harbour of Tears (1996).

Simmonds appeared on Tuscany (2001) and the live album In the Land of the Rising Sun: Live in Japan 2002. Simmonds worked with the French band from Bordeaux XII Alfonso on The Lost Frontier (1996), Odyssées (1999), Claude Monet vol.2 1889–1904 (2005), Charles Darwin (Fall 2011).

== Personal life ==
Simmonds currently resides in the village of Hersham. He has a wife, Sarah, two children, 2 granddaughters & a grandson.

== Influences ==
As influences, he cites progressive rock acts such as early Genesis, Emerson, Lake & Palmer and Pink Floyd.
