= Sunsets on Empire =

- Cover art by Mark Wilkinson

Studio album by Fish
- Released: 19 May 1997
- Recorded: 1997
- Genre: Progressive rock
- Length: 61:04
- Label: Dick Bros Record Company
- Producer: Steven Wilson

Fish chronology
Yin/Yang (1995)	Sunsets on Empire (1997)	Kettle of Fish (1998)

Singles from Sunsets on Empire
- 1. "Brother 52" Released: 28 April 1997; 2. "Change of Heart" Released: 11 August 1997

Professional ratings
Review scores
Source	Rating
Allmusic	3/5 stars
Kerrang!	4/5 stars

Sunsets on Empire is the fifth studio album by Fish (fourth of original material) since he left Marillion in 1988. It was released in 1997 and was mostly written together with Steven Wilson of Porcupine Tree, who co-composed six out of ten tracks on the original version, (plus one bonus track on the Japanese and remastered edition) and also produced the album. Tim Bowness, Wilson's partner in No-Man, has additional writing credits on one track. Two permanent members of Fish's line-up, keyboardist Foster Paterson, and guitarist Robin Boult co-wrote one and two tracks, respectively.

Unfortunately, the album and tour were flops and lost Fish hundreds of thousands of pounds, which meant he had to fold his Dick Brothers label. Roadrunner and Chocolate Frog/Snapper would subsequently reissue the album.

== Track listing ==
No.	Title	Length
1.	"The Perception of Johnny Punter" (Derek Dick, Steven Wilson)	8:36
2.	"Goldfish & Clowns" (Dick, Wilson)	6:36
3.	"Change of Heart" (Dick, Robin Boult)	3:41
4.	"What Colour is God?" (Dick, Wilson)	5:50
5.	"Tara" (Dick, Foster Paterson)	5:11
6.	"Jungle Ride" (Dick, Boult)	7:33
7.	"Worm in a Bottle" (Dick, Boult)	6:23
8.	"Brother 52" (Dick, Wilson)	6:05
9.	"Sunsets on Empire" (Dick, Wilson)	6:54
10.	"Say It with Flowers" (Dick, Wilson, Tim Bowness)	4:15

Remaster bonus track
No.	Title	Length
11.	"Do Not Walk Outside This Area" (Dick, Wilson)	6:29

=== 2015 The Remasters edition ===
Disc 1: Original Studio Album
No.	Title	Length
1.	"The Perception of Johnny Punter"	8:36
2.	"Goldfish & Clowns"	6:36
3.	"Change of Heart"	3:41
4.	"What Colour is God?"	5:50
5.	"Tara"	5:11
6.	"Jungle Ride"	7:33
7.	"Worm in a Bottle"	6:23
8.	"Brother 52"	6:05
9.	"Sunsets on Empire"	6:54
10.	"Say It with Flowers"	4:15

Disc 2: Demos with Steven Wilson + bonus tracks
No.	Title	Length
1.	"Goldfish and Clowns (demo)"	6:37
2.	"Sunsets on Empire (demo)"	6:53
3.	"What Colour Is God? (demo)"	5:57
4.	"Do Not Walk Outside This Area (demo)"	6:11
5.	"The Perception of Johnny Punter (demo)"	8:34
6.	"Say It with Flowers (demo)"	4:11
7.	"The Perception of Johnny Punter (USA version)"	8:38
8.	"Do Not Walk Outside This Area"	6:29
9.	"Tara (radio edit)"	4:03
10.	"Goldfish and Clowns (radio edit)"	4:14
11.	"What Colour Is God? (Max Rael remix)"	7:01

Disc 3: Live
No.	Title	Recording source	Length
1.	"Change of Heart"	Communion	3:44
2.	"Tara"	Communion	5:30
3.	"Worm in a Bottle"	Communion	5:20
4.	"Goldfish and Clowns"	The Haddington Tapes	6:44
5.	"Jungle Ride"	Sunsets on Empire: Live in Poland 1997	8:09
6.	"The Perception of Johnny Punter"	Sunsets on Empire: Live in Poland 1997	11:15
7.	"What Colour Is God?"	Sunsets on Empire: Live in Poland 1997	5:53
8.	"Brother 52"	Sunsets on Empire: Live in Poland 1997	6:07
9.	"Sunsets on Empire"	Sashimi	8:59

== Personnel ==
- Fish – lead vocals (all)
- Steven Wilson – lead guitar (1, 10), rhythm guitar (1, 8, 9), keyboards (1–6, 8–10), string arrangement (1), loops/sampler (2, 4, 5, 8)
- Robin Boult – rhythm guitar (1–4, 6–9), 12 string guitar (1–6, 8, 10), lead guitar (5, 8), e-bow (5, 8)
- Frank Usher – lead guitar (1, 7, 8), rhythm guitar (2–4, 7, 8)
- Foss Patterson – Hammond organ (1,2, 7–9), piano (1, 2, 5, 9), keyboards (3, 5, 6), backing vocals (4), string arrangement (5)
- Ewen Vernal – bass (1–9)
- Dave Stewart – drums (1–9)
- Chris Gaugh – cello (1, 5)
- Brian Hale – violin (1, 5)
- Dave Haswell – percussion (2, 5, 6)
- Martyn Bennett – violin (6, 8)
- Fraser Speirs (misspelled as "Spiers") – harmonica (6)
- "Doc" – voice on telephone (8)
- Terence Jones – French horn (9)
- Lorna Bannon – backing vocals (1, 2, 5, 9)
- Don Jack – backing vocals (1)
- Chris Thomson – backing vocals (1)
- Katherine Garrett – backing vocals (3, 6)
- Annie McCraig – backing vocals (9)

== Charts ==
Country	Peak position
Germany	73
Netherlands	44
United Kingdom	42
