= Vigil in a Wilderness of Mirrors =

- Cover art by Mark Wilkinson

Studio album by Fish
- Released: 29 January 1990
- Recorded: January – June 1989
- Studios: Townhouse Studios (London); Abbey Road Studios (London)
- Genres: Neo-prog, pop rock
- Length: 50:38 (original CD); 45:56 (vinyl)
- Label: EMI
- Producer: Jon Kelly

Fish chronology
Vigil in a Wilderness of Mirrors (1990)	Internal Exile (1991)

Singles from Vigil in a Wilderness of Mirrors
- 1. "State of Mind" Released: 16 October 1989; 2. "Big Wedge" Released: 27 December 1989; 3. "A Gentleman's Excuse Me" Released: 5 March 1990; 4. "The Company" Released: 18 July 1990 (Germany)

Professional ratings
Review scores
Source	Rating
Allmusic	4/5 stars

Vigil in a Wilderness of Mirrors is the debut solo album by Scottish neo-prog singer Fish, released in 1990.

Fish had departed Marillion in 1988. Although the recordings for this album finished as early as June 1989, EMI Records decided to delay the release until early 1990 to avoid collision with Marillion's album Seasons End, released in September. However, the track "State of Mind", featuring former Dire Straits guitarist Hal Lindes on guitar and guest musician John Keeble (then of Spandau Ballet) on drums, was released as a single as early as 16 October 1989, more than three months ahead of the album. Further singles from the album were "Big Wedge" (the actual lead single, 27 December 1989), "A Gentleman's Excuse Me" (5 March 1990) and "The Company" (18 July 1990, only released in Germany).

== Production and recording ==
The album was largely recorded at Townhouse Studios, London, with orchestral parts (on A Gentleman's Excuse Me) having been recorded at Abbey Road Studios, during the first half of 1989, and produced by Jon Kelly.

== Cover art ==
Complete version of the painting by Mark Wilkinson on the inside of the gatefold cover

The cover art was by Mark Wilkinson who had illustrated all Marillion albums and singles while Fish was their singer, and went on to design almost all Fish solo covers. The front cover features a close-up from a larger, very detailed painting/collage inside the gatefold LP cover and the CD booklet. The painting contains many references to the lyrics, political allusions as well as "hidden" messages only understandable to fans (such as the faces of Marillion's keyboardist Mark Kelly and manager John Arnison). The central element is a "hill" consisting of junk consumer goods in a post-apocalyptic landscape, on top of which a couple clad in pseudo-oriental clothes stare into the distance, holding an hourglass. The man's cape, flapping in the wind, resembles the east of Scotland, with the Southern Uplands (Fish's home region) lit by light beams apparently emitted by the hourglass – a reference to Fish's interest in Scottish culture. Only the couple and the top of the hill are on the front cover. The TV sets and the Amiga 500 computer set the couple is standing on show pictures of Fish's face; on the larger version inside, these are replaced with faces from Ingres' painting The Golden Age.

== Lyrics ==
The album is not a concept album, however, several of the songs refer to "the hill" – a metaphor for greed and consumerism. The songs deal with the themes that Fish has always been passionate about – personal issues and politics – but in single-song format. "State of Mind" and "Big Wedge" stand out as the most overtly political songs: "State of Mind" strongly articulates the growing civic disillusionment in the late Thatcher years (although it does not mention her by name), "Big Wedge" is an explicit criticism of capitalist greed, American society and policies (the cover of the single features Uncle Sam offering a wedge of dollar bills to the viewer). Incidentally, the lyric had earlier been vetoed by Marillion as "anti-American", they feared it might have hampered their entry into the U.S. market with the next album. Other songs express a more general disgust with materialism ("Vigil", "View From The Hill" and "The Company", the last of which is also a coded account of Fish's disillusionment with and departure from Marillion). "Family Business" refers to domestic violence, the bonus track "The Voyeur (I Like To Watch)" to TV voyeurism. Finally, "A Gentleman's Excuse Me" and "Cliché" are love songs.

The phrase "wilderness of mirrors" is originally from T. S. Eliot's poem Gerontion, but has since become a widely used metaphor for disinformation in spy fiction, where Fish picked it up.

A number of the lyrical concepts on the album (most particularly, the Voice in the Crowd motif) can be heard in Marillion demo sessions released on the 1999 remaster of Clutching at Straws. These sessions were part of the writing process for Marillion's fifth studio album with Fish, which never came to fruition. Many of the musical ideas developed on those demos can be heard on Seasons End, the first Marillion album with Steve Hogarth.

== Musical style and contributing musicians ==
The album covers a variety of musical styles, including progressive rock ("Vigil"), pop rock ("Big Wedge"), hard rock ("View From the Hill"), and folk music ("The Company"). As he is primarily a lyricist and not a musical composer, Fish collaborated with keyboardist Mickey Simmonds in writing all songs except "View From the Hill", which was co-written and recorded with current Iron Maiden guitarist Janick Gers. Ex-Dire Straits guitarist Hal Lindes contributed additionally to the writing of "State of Mind", "Family Business" and "Cliché". He also played guitar on most tracks, along with Frank Usher, a Fish companion from pre-Marillion times. Drums were handled by Mark Brzezicki (of Big Country), John Keeble (of Spandau Ballet, "State of Mind" only), bass by John Giblin, additional percussion by Luís Jardim, backing vocals by Tessa Niles, who had already appeared on Clutching at Straws, Marillion's last album with Fish (1987), and Carol Kenyon. Apart from these, there are performances on individual songs by The Kick Horns (brass instruments on "Big Wedge"), Davy Spillane (pipes and tin whistle on "Vigil"), Phil Cunningham (tin whistle, bodhran, accordion on "The Company", "Internal Exile"), Aly Bain (violin on "The Company", "Internal Exile") and Gavyn Wright (credited as Gavin Wright, violin on "The Company", orchestral arrangement on "A Gentleman's Excuse Me", which was recorded with a 23-piece orchestra at Abbey Road Studios).

The band with which Fish toured the album in 1989/1990 consisted of Mickey Simmonds (keyboards), Frank Usher & Robin Boult (guitars), Mark Brzezicki (drums) and Steve Brzezicki (bass, Mark's brother).

== Re-releases ==
Remastered by Calum Malcolm in 1997, the album was reissued three times: 18 December 1997 on Fish's old label Dick Bros Record Company, on 28 October 1998 on Roadrunner Records, and in 2006 by Fish's current label Chocolate Frog. All remastered versions contain the original tracks and five bonus tracks originally released as b-sides of the accompanying singles, plus the original 1989 version of "Internal Exile". The edited and extended versions of the singles' A-sides are not included, a solo live recording of the Marillion song Punch and Judy featured on the single "The Company" is also absent.

In 2024, a deluxe edition of Vigil In A Wilderness Of Mirrors was released on Chocolate Frog Records as a 3CD digibook, a 4CD/Blu-ray set, and a 2LP boxed version. The deluxe edition includes a new remix and remaster (including Cliché and View From The Hill having switched positions in the tracklisting for View From The Hill to close the album, as originally intended), as well as, on the Blu-ray disc, new Dolby Atmos and 5.1 surround mixes by Calum Malcolm, documentaries and promotional videos. The set also includes a disc of album demos, 2 discs of live material at various venues from previously released live albums.

== Legal dispute with EMI ==
After Fish left Marillion, their label EMI automatically held the rights to his solo recordings under a leaving-member clause. However, Fish was dissatisfied with EMI's promotion and distribution and sought to leave the contract, which he finally achieved after a drawn-out lawsuit in late 1990/1991. As a result, Vigil in a Wilderness of Mirrors remains Fish's only album on EMI. EMI still owned the rights, which were licensed back to Fish, who has reissued it as described in the previous section. The album is now owned by Parlophone/WMG.

== Track listing ==
All tracks are written by Derek W. Dick and Mickey Simmonds, except where noted.

No.	Title	Length
1.	"Vigil"	8:43
2.	"Big Wedge"	5:19
3.	"State of Mind" (Dick, Hal Lindes, Simmonds)	4:42
4.	"The Company"	4:04
5.	"A Gentleman's Excuse Me"	4:15
6.	"The Voyeur (I Like To Watch)" (Not on LP)	4:42
7.	"Family Business" (Dick, Lindes, Simmonds)	5:14
8.	"View From The Hill" (Dick, Janick Gers)	6:38
9.	"Cliché" (Dick, Lindes, Simmonds)	7:01

Remaster bonus tracks
No.	Title	Length
9.	"Jack and Jill" (B-side of "Big Wedge")	4:28
10.	"Internal Exile (1989 Version)"	4:51
11.	"The Company (Demo)"	4:30
12.	"A Gentleman's Excuse Me (Demo)"	3:54
13.	"Whiplash" (B-side of "A Gentleman's Excuse Me")	4:25

=== 3-CD, 2024, Remastered/Remixed, Digi-Book ===
Disc 1: 2024 Remix by Calum Malcolm
No.	Title	Length
1.	"Vigil in a Wilderness of Mirrors"	8:46
2.	"Big Wedge"	5:20
3.	"State of Mind"	4:45
4.	"The Company"	4:04
5.	"A Gentleman's Excuse Me"	4:19
6.	"The Voyeur (I Like To Watch)"	4:46
7.	"Family Business"	5:18
8.	"Cliché"	7:06
9.	"View From The Hill"	6:52
10.	"Jack and Jill"	4:26
11.	"Internal Exile ('89 Version)"	4:47
12.	"Whiplash"	4:21

Disc 2: Demos
No.	Title	Length
1.	"Vigil In A Wilderness Of Mirrors (Demo)"	8:33
2.	"State Of Mind (Demo)"	4:43
3.	"The Company (Demo)"	4:15
4.	"The Voyeur (Demo)"	5:06
5.	"Big Wedge (Demo)"	5:41
6.	"Big Wedge (Instrumental Demo)"	5:55
7.	"Cliché (Demo)"	4:34
8.	"View From A Hill (Demo)"	6:45
9.	"Family Business (Demo)"	5:11
10.	"A Gentleman's Excuse Me (Demo)"	3:59
11.	"The Curious Hill (Unused Mickey Simmonds Demo)"	8:34

Disc 3: Live
No.	Title	Recording source	Length
1.	"Vigil In A Wilderness Of Mirrors"	Uncle Fish & the Crypt Creepers	9:26
2.	"Big Wedge"	Uncle Fish & the Crypt Creepers	6:31
3.	"The Voyeur"	Pigpens Birthday	5:38
4.	"State Of Mind"	Pigpens Birthday	5:07
5.	"A Gentleman's Excuse Me"	Pigpens Birthday	3:53
6.	"Cliché"	Pigpens Birthday	6:47
7.	"Family Business"	Sushi	5:43
8.	"The Company"	Sushi	4:08
9.	"State Of Mind"	Derek Dick & His Amazing Electric Bear	5:40
10.	"A Gentleman's Excuse Me"	Vigil's End UK Tour 2021	3:58
11.	"Family Business (Acoustic)"	Fishheads Club Live	6:12
12.	"Vigil In A Wilderness Of Mirrors (Acoustic)"	Fishheads Club Live	10:35

=== 4-CD + Blu-ray Disc, 2024, Remastered/Remixed, Digi-Book ===
Disc 1: 2024 Remix by Calum Malcolm
No.	Title	Length
1.	"Vigil in a Wilderness of Mirrors"	8:46
2.	"Big Wedge"	5:20
3.	"State of Mind"	4:45
4.	"The Company"	4:04
5.	"A Gentleman's Excuse Me"	4:19
6.	"The Voyeur (I Like To Watch)"	4:46
7.	"Family Business"	5:18
8.	"Cliché"	7:06
9.	"View From The Hill"	6:52
10.	"Jack and Jill"	4:26
11.	"Internal Exile ('89 Version)"	4:47
12.	"Whiplash"	4:21

Disc 2: Demos
No.	Title	Length
1.	"Vigil In A Wilderness Of Mirrors (Demo)"	8:33
2.	"State Of Mind (Demo)"	4:43
3.	"The Company (Demo)"	4:15
4.	"The Voyeur (Demo)"	5:06
5.	"Big Wedge (Demo)"	5:41
6.	"Big Wedge (Instrumental Demo)"	5:55
7.	"Cliché (Demo)"	4:34
8.	"View From A Hill (Demo)"	6:45
9.	"Family Business (Demo)"	5:11
10.	"A Gentleman's Excuse Me (Demo)"	3:59
11.	"The Curious Hill (Unused Mickey Simmonds Demo)"	8:34

Disc 3: Live
No.	Title	Recording source	Length
1.	"Vigil In A Wilderness Of Mirrors"	The Complete BBC Sessions	8:44
2.	"Family Business"	The Complete BBC Sessions	5:22
3.	"The Voyeur"	Pigpens Birthday	5:38
4.	"State Of Mind"	Pigpens Birthday	5:07
5.	"A Gentleman's Excuse Me"	Pigpens Birthday	3:53
6.	"Cliché"	Pigpens Birthday	6:47
7.	"Big Wedge"	The Complete BBC Sessions	6:23
8.	"The Company"	The Complete BBC Sessions	4:02
9.	"Vigil In A Wilderness Of Mirrors"	The Complete BBC Sessions	9:21
10.	"State Of Mind" (featuring Jan Akkerman)	Fool's Company – Live in Holland 2002	13:18

Disc 4: Live (Continued)
No.	Title	Recording source	Length
1.	"Vigil In A Wilderness Of Mirrors"	Uncle Fish & the Crypt Creepers	9:26
2.	"Big Wedge"	Uncle Fish & the Crypt Creepers	6:31
3.	"State Of Mind"	Derek Dick & His Amazing Electric Bear	5:40
4.	"Family Business"	Sushi	5:43
5.	"The Company"	Sushi	4:08
6.	"Cliché"	Sunsets on Empire: Live in Poland 1997	8:08
7.	"View From A Hill"	Vigil's End UK Tour 2021	6:41
8.	"A Gentleman's Excuse Me"	Vigil's End UK Tour 2021	3:58
9.	"Family Business"	Fishheads Club Live	6:12
10.	"Vigil In A Wilderness Of Mirrors"	Fishheads Club Live	10:35

Blu-ray Disc

1. Vigil In A Wilderness Of Mirrors 2024 Remix - Dolby Atmos and 5.1 mixes
2. Fish Interview "Climbing The Hill" Documentary Film
3. Mark Wilkinson Interview "The Art Of Vigil" Documentary Film
4. State Of Mind Promo Video
5. Big Wedge Promo Video
6. A Gentleman's Excuse Me Promo Video
7. Pigpen's Birthday - Live at the Hammersmith Odeon 2/4/1990 Full 'Official Bootleg' Concert Audio
8. For Whom The Bells Toll! - Edinburgh Playhouse New Year's Eve 1991 Full 'Official Bootleg' Concert Audio

== Personnel ==
- Fish (Derek W. Dick) – vocals
- Frank Usher – guitars (Tracks 1–7, 9–12 and 14)
- Hal Lindes – guitars (1–7 and 11)
- Janick Gers – guitars (8)
- John Giblin – bass guitars (1–9 and 11)
- Mickey Simmonds – keyboards (1–12 and 14); piano (13); drum programming (10 and 12)
- Davy Spillane – pipes (1); whistles (1)
- Phil Cunningham – whistles (1, 4 and 11); accordion (4 and 11); bodhrán (4)
- Aly Bain – violin (4 and 11)
- Gavyn Wright – violin (4)
- Alison Jones – violin (12)
- Mark Brzezicki – drums (1, 2, 4, 6–9 and 11)
- John Keeble – drums (3)
- Luís Jardim – percussion (2–4 and 9)
- Carol Kenyon – backing vocals (2, 3, 7 and 9)
- Tessa Niles – backing vocals (2, 7 and 9)

== Charts ==
The only Fish album to be released by EMI, it was also his most commercially successful. In February 1990, the album peaked at number 5 in the UK Albums Chart, with the singles reaching no. 32 ("State of Mind", October 1989), no. 25 ("Big Wedge", January 1990) and no. 30 ("Gentleman's Excuse Me", March 1990) on the UK Singles Chart.

Weekly chart performance for Vigil in a Wilderness of Mirrors by Fish
Chart (1990)	Peak position
Dutch Albums (Album Top 100)	20
German Albums (Offizielle Top 100)	6
Norwegian Albums (VG-lista)	9
Swedish Albums (Sverigetopplistan)	14
Swiss Albums (Schweizer Hitparade)	6
UK Albums (Official Charts)	5

1990 year-end chart performance for Vigil in a Wilderness of Mirrors by Fish
Chart (1990)	Position
European Albums (Music & Media)	91
German Albums (Offizielle Top 100)	72

== Certifications ==
Certifications for Vigil in a Wilderness of Mirrors
Region	Certification	Certified units/sales
United Kingdom (BPI)	Silver	60,000^{^}
^{^} Shipments figures based on certification alone.
