= A Chord Too Far =

Box set by Tony Banks
- Released: 31 July 2015
- Recorded: 1979–2012
- Genre: Progressive rock, pop rock, classical
- Label: Cherry Red Records
- Producer: Tony Banks, Nick Davis, David Hentschel, Richard James Burgess, John Eden

Tony Banks chronology
Six Pieces for Orchestra (2012)	A Chord Too Far (2015)	Five (2018)

Professional ratings
Review scores
Source	Rating
AllMusic	4/5 stars
Record Collector	2/5 stars

A Chord Too Far is a box set from the English keyboardist Tony Banks, released on 31 July 2015 on Cherry Red Records. The set includes tracks from each album from his solo career, spanning from 1979 to 2012.

The image on the cover is taken from Philémon et le piano sauvage, a graphic novel by Fred.

== Track listing ==
All songs performed by Tony Banks, except where noted. *Remixed by Nick Davis & Tony Banks

=== CD 1 ===
1. "Rebirth*" (from Soundtracks, 1986) – 1:23
2. "At the Edge of Night*" (from The Fugitive, 1983) – 6:01
3. "Walls of Sound" (Performed by Strictly Inc; from Strictly Inc, 1995) – 5:08
4. "Lion of Symmetry*" (from Soundtracks) – 7:13
5. "The More I Hide It*" (Performed under the band name "Bankstatement"; from Bankstatement, 1989) – 4:29
6. "Shortcut to Somewhere*" (Featuring Fish; from Soundtracks) – 3:40
7. "The Waters of Lethe*" (from A Curious Feeling, 1979) – 6:33
8. "I Wanna Change the Score" (from Still, 1991 (United Kingdom)/1992 (U.S.)) – 4:30
9. "Water Out of Wine" (from Still) – 4:39
10. "Something to Live For" (Performed by Strictly Inc; from Strictly Inc) – 5:18
11. "By You*" (from The Fugitive) – 4:31
12. "Never Let Me Know" (Performed by Strictly Inc; from Strictly Inc) – 6:21
13. "Thirty Three’s*" (from The Fugitive) – 4:41

=== CD 2 ===
1. "Charity Balls" (Performed by Strictly Inc; from Strictly Inc) – 4:40
2. "An Island in the Darkness" (Performed by Strictly Inc; from Strictly Inc) – 17:22
3. "The Border*" (Performed under the band name "Bankstatement"; from Bankstatement) – 5:54
4. "Lucky Me*" (from A Curious Feeling) – 4:27
5. "Another Murder of a Day" (from Still) – 9:05
6. "Moving Under*" (from The Fugitive) – 5:59
7. "Still It Takes Me by Surprise" (from Still) – 6:28
8. "Red Day on Blue Street" (from Still) – 5:49
9. "After the Lie*" (from A Curious Feeling) – 4:51
10. "Redwing*" (from Soundtracks) – 5:50

=== CD 3 ===
1. "Queen of Darkness*" (Performed under the band name "Bankstatement"; from Bankstatement) – 4:35
2. "A Piece of You" (Performed by Strictly Inc; from Strictly Inc) – 4:48
3. "Big Man*" (Performed under the band name "Bankstatement"; from Bankstatement) – 4:15
4. "Angel Face" (from Still) – 5:19
5. "This Is Love" (from The Fugitive) – 5:09
6. "I’ll Be Waiting*" (Performed under the band name "Bankstatement"; from Bankstatement) – 5:56
7. "Back to Back" (from Still) – 4:33
8. "For a While*" (from A Curious Feeling) – 3:40
9. "Throwback" (Performed under the band name "Bankstatement"; from Bankstatement) – 4:34
10. "You Call This Victory*" (from Soundtracks) – 4:32
11. "And the Wheels Keep Turning" (from The Fugitive) – 4:46
12. "You*" (from A Curious Feeling) – 6:32
13. "The Final Curtain" (from Still) – 4:57

=== CD 4 ===
1. "Blade" (from Six Pieces for Orchestra, 2012) – 10:20
2. "Black Down" (from Seven: A Suite for Orchestra, 2004) – 9:47
3. "Siren" (from Six Pieces for Orchestra) – 8:48
4. "Earthlight" (from Seven: A Suite for Orchestra) – 4:43
5. "From the Undertow*" (from A Curious Feeling) – 2:47
6. "Spring Tide" (Demo version; originally from Seven: A Suite for Orchestra) – 9:39
7. "Neap Tide" (Demo version; originally from Seven: A Suite for Orchestra) – 4:10
8. "City of Gold" (Demo version; originally from Six Pieces for Orchestra) – 11:54
9. "The Chase" (from The Wicked Lady soundtrack, 1983) – 3:29
10. "Kit" (from The Wicked Lady soundtrack) – 3:04
11. "Poppet" (Previously unreleased, 2015; originally written for Still) – 4:04
12. "The Wicked Lady" (from The Wicked Lady soundtrack) – 3:48
