= The Other Ones (Australian-German band) =

German band

- Origin: West Berlin, Germany
- Genre: Pop rock
- Years active: 1984–1990
- Label: Virgin
- Past members: Alf Klimek; Jayney Klimek; Johnny Klimek; Andreas Schwarz-Ruszczynski; Stephan Gottwald; Uwe Hoffmann

The Other Ones were a pop rock band which formed in Berlin in 1984. Australian-born siblings Alf Klimek (lead vocals), the twins Jayney Klimek (lead vocals) and Johnny Klimek (bass guitar) were joined by a German-born trio of Stephan Gottwald (keyboards), Andreas Schwarz-Ruszczynski (guitars) and Uwe Hoffmann (drums). They issued two albums, The Other Ones (1986) and Learning to Walk (1988), before disbanding in 1990. Their second single, "We Are What We Are" (May 1987), peaked at No. 53 on the United States Billboard Hot 100 and reached the top 40 on the New Zealand Singles Chart. Its follow up, "Holiday", peaked at No. 29 on October 17, 1987 on the US Billboard Hot 100, No. 10 in New Zealand, No. 4 in Germany, No. 13 in Austria and No. 22 in Switzerland.

== History ==
The Other Ones were a pop sextet, formed in 1984 in Berlin with Australian-born singer, Alf Klimek (ex-Spliff/Nina Hagen Band), his siblings – the twins – Jayney Klimek (lead vocals) and Johnny Klimek (bass guitar); joined by German-born trio of Stephan Gottwald (keyboards), Andreas Schwarz-Ruszczynski (guitars) and Uwe Hoffmann (drums). The Klimeks' cousins, Nic and Chris Cester, are members of Australian rockers, Jet. Alf had travelled the world in the late 1970s as a puppeteer and then as a singer. He returned home to Melbourne in 1981 and collaborated with Johnny.

In late 1983, the Klimek brothers moved to West Berlin and along with Jayney (who had been in a band in Australia) formed the group early in the following year. Johnny later recalled that Alf "wanted to get this band together, go to Europe and get a record deal. So we did it, in '83 I went over there, became a cleaner for about three years, and worked in an Indian restaurant. I did all their shit kicking stuff, and got miserably depressed in their European winters."

They signed to Virgin Records in 1984 and recorded an album in Sussex, England at Comfort's Place Studios. They shared the same management as the band Alphaville, and based themselves in Berlin. Jayney guested on lead vocals for that group's track, "Lassie Come Home", on their second album, Afternoons in Utopia (June 1986).

=== Self-titled debut album ===
Their debut studio album, The Other Ones, was released in late 1986, it was produced by the Brit, Christopher Neil. It peaked at No. 55 on the German Albums Chart. AllMusic's Jason Kaufman described it as "a perfect example of the simple pop optimism that was everywhere in the middle of the '80s. With tinny, electronic drum kit beats, pseudo-macho guitar solos, cheesy keyboard riffs, and romantic simpleton lyrics on par with 'roses are red, violets are blue,' there's plenty here to offend those who take their songwriting seriously."

The album's lead single, "All the Love" (1986), did not chart. Its second single, "We Are What We Are", peaked at No. 53 on the United States Billboard Hot 100 on 30 May 1987 and No. 38 on the New Zealand Singles Chart. Its follow up, "Holiday", peaked at No. 29 on 17 October 1987 on the US Billboard Hot 100, No. 10 in New Zealand, No. 4 in Germany, No. 13 in Austria, and No. 22 in Switzerland. Jerry McCulley described how the "infectious, slickly-produced 'Holiday' became an international smash seemingly everywhere but America." He felt the group "fused the era's synth-riff conceits with some tasty guitar licks, with Jayney leading the way into pop hook heaven." Music videos for the latter two singles were also provided. "Holiday" was remixed and re-released as "Another Holiday" in 1991.

=== Learning to Walk ===
The Other Ones toured worldwide for almost a year. In 1988, they issued their second studio album, Learning to Walk, via Virgin Records. It had been recorded at Trevor Horn's studios in London with engineer-producer, Pete Schwier, and the band co-producing. For the final album cut, the drums were overdubbed by Geoff Dugmore and percussion was provided by Frank Ricotti. Johnny later remembered "[we had] big budgets, and my ego was like, 'Wow, this is easy!' And I wanted to co-produce with the band and the engineer, and it didn't work (laughs), the record wasn't good." None of its singles charted. In 1990, less than five years after beginning the group, Alf left, in essence dissolving the band.

== After the break-up ==
After the Other Ones had disbanded Alf Klimek travelled between Berlin and Melbourne, eventually he opened a music recording studio, Birdland, with fellow producer, Lindsay Gravina. In 1998 Alf created a series of musical and audio book CD productions for Klaus Baumgart based on the author's Lauras Stern books which generated a German TV series, from 2002 to 2011, and an associated film, Laura's Star (September 2004). Johnny and Jayney helped out in part of the production. Later Alf and Johnny were partners for children's music and in writing concepts, scripts, and music for children's theatre, film, and television.

Jayney Klimek has collaborated with other musical artists and was a co-lead singer for the Tony Banks' project, Bankstatement, in 1989. She was a vocalist on his 1991 solo album, Still. She has also worked with Tangerine Dream, Paul van Dyk, Alphaville, and the French band, XII Alfonso. She co-wrote and performed lead vocals on Terranova's Digital Tenderness (2004). In that same year she started a new band, You Pretty Thing, with former Other Ones bandmate Schwarz-Ruszczynski; backing vocals were provided by Alf and Johnny. They released an album in March 2008, Tune In, and their first single, "Push It", became the most played song on German radio group RadioEins history. That band subsequently went into hiatus.

Johnny Klimek collaborated with the German film-maker, Tom Tykwer, and fellow composer Reinhold Heil on the soundtracks for Tykwer's films Winter Sleepers (1997), Run Lola Run (1998), Perfume: The Story of a Murderer (2006), The International (2009), and for Tykwer's collaboration with Lana and Lilly Wachowski for the film, Cloud Atlas (2012). In 2015, Klimek worked with Tykwer to compose the score for the J. Michael Straczynski-Wachowskis’ Netflix series Sense8. He has composed music for the HBO television series: Deadwood, John from Cincinnati and the feature film, One Hour Photo. His credits also include Land of the Dead, One Missed Call and 6 Days on Earth.

Andreas Schwarz-Ruszczynski played in other groups throughout the 1990s, collaborating with Boy George, Trevor Horn, Klaus Schulze, Pet Shop Boys, Steve Lipson, Julian Mendelsen and Jack White. In 1999 German techno band UKW, with Schwarz-Ruszczynski aboard, entered the dance charts with "Hypnotic", produced by local trance DJ–producer ATB. Schwarz-Ruszczynski opened his own recording studio, Bibest Studio, in Berlin and has co-produced, written, and recorded projects. In 2004 he and fellow ex-Other Ones bandmate, Jayney Klimek, created the band You Pretty Thing which recorded at the Bibest Studio and performed all over Europe in support of their debut album, which was released in 2008.

Stephan Gottwald began producing in 1991 at Hansa Tonstudio, Berlin and collaborated with Ben Lauber and Moses Schneider to form a production team, Bauknex. He has produced and created his own music albums independently since. Uwe Hoffmann also produced albums for Die Ärzte and other musicians including Ulla Meinecke and Sportfreunde Stiller.

== Discography ==
=== Albums ===
- The Other Ones (1986) GER: No. 55
- Learning to Walk (1988)

=== Singles ===
Year	Song	Peak chart positions						Album
Year	Song	AUS	AUT	GER	NZL	SWI	US Hot	Album
1986	"All the Love"	—	—	—	—	—	—	The Other Ones
1987	"We Are What We Are"	—	—	—	38	—	53	The Other Ones
1987	"Holiday"	87	13	4	10	22	29	The Other Ones
1987	"Stranger"	—	—	—	—	—	—	The Other Ones
1988	"Emotional Baby"	—	—	—	—	—	—	Learning to Walk
1988	"Money and Gold"	—	—	—	—	—	—	Learning to Walk
