= Five (Tony Banks album) =

Studio album by Tony Banks
- Released: 23 February 2018
- Recorded: 22–26 March 2017
- Studio: Angel Recording Studios (London, England); CNSO Studio Gallery 1 (Prague, Czech Republic); Tony Banks' home
- Genre: Classical
- Length: 57:11
- Label: BMG
- Producer: Nick Davis

Tony Banks chronology
A Chord Too Far (2015)	Five (2018)	Banks Vaults: The Albums 1979–1995 (2019)

Five (stylised as 5) is the sixth studio album by the English musician, songwriter, and singer Tony Banks. It was released on 23 February 2018 by BMG Records. It is his third album of classical music, following Seven: A Suite for Orchestra (2004) and Six Pieces for Orchestra (2012).

Five is included in the 2024 boxset 18 Pieces for Orchestra 7–6–5 together with his other two classical albums.

== Background and recording ==
Five is Banks's third solo album of classical music, following Seven: A Suite for Orchestra (2004) and Six Pieces for Orchestra (2012). Banks had thought of pursuing classical music at a later stage in his career when he could dedicate more time to it. Five originated when Banks was commissioned to write a fifteen-minute piece for live performance at the Cheltenham Music Festival in July 2014, the seventieth instalment of the festival, by artistic director, Meurig Bowen. Banks chose a composition from a collection of short pieces that were in development at the time and worked on it further, which was then known as "Arpregg" but re-titled "Prelude to a Million Years" and became the opening track on Five. Banks spoke of the debut performance of the composition: "The softer passages were fine, but the parts that required real oomph, like the big cello riffs, didn't work very well at all".

Following the Cheltenham Music Festival commission, Banks secured a one-album deal with BMG. It marks his first release on the BMG label, having released his first two classical albums on Naxos Records. Banks reasoned the change down to BMG being more of a "go ahead" label with more favourable promotional effort and its enthusiasm to release it. Banks then felt encouraged by the Cheltenham Music Festival performance to take the individual parts, re-record them, and assemble them in layers similar to that of a rock-oriented album so he could "really get it right". This approach was applied for all the tracks on Five. A series of "very definite and elaborate" demos were recorded which were then used as a template for the orchestra to play their arrangements from, and to Banks, sounded similar to the final arrangements. The piano heard on the album is what Banks had originally played on the demo recordings.

The album comprises five orchestral pieces composed by Banks with their accompanying orchestral arrangements by Nick Ingman. Banks admitted that his percussion arrangements were "lazy", and credits Ingman for improving them to sound better than what he originally had in mind. Having scored several films in his career, he wrote the music on Five without any particular frame of mind, instead writing "what I write". The change in mood, tempo, and atmosphere in the pieces particularly interested him and compared the changes to Genesis songs like "The Musical Box" and "Supper's Ready". His composing for the album deviated little from developing pop and rock songs, but liked the greater sense of freedom that classical composition gives. Banks gave careful consideration to the titles of his pieces and wished to avoid names with "too much baggage". "Prelude to a Million Years" got its title from the 1933 same-titled wordless novel by American artist Lynd Ward, of which Banks is a fan. Banks maintained that "Renaissance" is not based on a piece developed during a Genesis rehearsal session despite what a promotional material for the album had included. A Billboard article noted a resemblance to the band's song "The Carpet Crawlers" from The Lamb Lies Down on Broadway (1974) on "Reveille".

== Release ==
After it was first announced in December 2017, Five was released on CD and a two LP set on 23 February 2018. It was originally set for release on 2 February, but management at BMG moved it back as they wanted to conduct further promotional work for the album prior to releasing it.

Banks considers a fourth classical album containing a four-movement symphony would be a point of stopping his venture into the genre. He also hopes the material on Five is performed live in concert in some capacity, at some point.

== Track listing ==
No.	Title	Length
1.	"Prelude to a Million Years"	15:34
2.	"Reveille"	8:58
3.	"Ebb and Flow"	12:49
4.	"Autumn Sonata"	10:16
5.	"Renaissance"	10:14

== Personnel ==
Music

- Czech National Symphony Orchestra and choir
- Nick Ingman – orchestrations and conductor
- Tony Banks – composer, grand piano, celesta
- John Barclay – cornet and trumpet (2, 4)
- Martin Robertson – saxophone (3, 5), duduk (5)
- Frank Ricotti – percussion
- Skaila Kanga – harp

Production

- Tony Banks – producer, liner notes
- Nick Davis – producer, mixing
- Simon Rhodes – engineer
- Steve Price – engineer
- Tom Mitchell – mixing
- Miles Showell – mastering
- Ron Shillingford – music copyist
- Joanne Greenwood – coordinator
- Stefan Knapp – artwork
- Ryan Art – sleeve design
- Tony Smith – management at Tony Smith Personal Management
- Emily Banks – photography
- Cliff Masterson – transfers
