= The Fugitive (album) =

Studio album by Tony Banks
- Released: June 1983
- Recorded: 1982–1983
- Studios: The Farm (Chiddingfold, Surrey)
- Genres: Progressive pop; synth-pop; new wave; progressive rock; Reggae
- Length: 52:35
- Labels: (United Kingdom) Charisma; (United States) Atlantic
- Producers: Tony Banks; Stephen Short

Tony Banks chronology
The Wicked Lady (1983)	The Fugitive (1983)	Soundtracks (1986)

Singles from The Fugitive
- 1. "This is Love" Released: May 1983; 2. "And the Wheels Keep Turning" Released: August 1983

The Fugitive is the second solo album by Genesis keyboardist Tony Banks. It was originally released in June 1983, on Charisma (UK), and Atlantic (US). It was produced by Banks himself, and co-produced by the Grammy Award–winning Stephen Short. The album is the only album in which Banks sings all of the lead vocals. On the previous concept album, A Curious Feeling (1979) all of the vocals were done by Kim Beacon. When that album did not turn out too successfully, Banks thought that it was pointless to continue that project. As compared to A Curious Feeling, the songs on The Fugitive were much more commercially accessible and less experimental.

When the album was released in late June 1983, it received mixed reviews and peaked at number 50 in the UK, lasting within the Top 100 for only two weeks. "This Is Love" and "And the Wheels Keep Turning" were released as singles, but they both failed to chart.

The album was re-issued on CD in the UK. In 1999, a CD re-issue was released in Russia, unofficially. The Fugitive was reissued in early 2016, remixed by Banks and Nick Davis.

== Recording ==
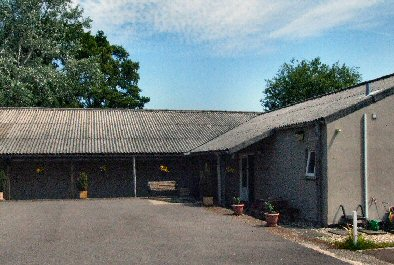
The Farm, pictured in 2006, where The Fugitive was recorded.

In October 1982, Genesis wrapped their two-month tour of North America and Europe in support of their live album, Three Sides Live. The band then went on a brief hiatus, and during this time Banks recorded the album. Like bandmate Phil Collins, Banks recorded all of the basic tracks at his home on a professional 8-track tape machine, added to and mixed at The Farm, the band's recording studio in Chiddingfold, Surrey. Genesis reconvened before the album's release, in March 1983 to start work on their next studio album at the same studio.

Three guest musicians (mostly Steve Gadd) played drums, while a Linn LM-1 was used in place of a live drummer on the instrumental "Thirty Three's". Daryl Stuermer (guitar) from Genesis' and Phil Collins' backing band was recruited, as was Mo Foster (bass) who played on Collins' solo album Hello, I Must Be Going!. The two bonus tracks "K2" and "Sometime Never" were recorded in the same sessions but were not included on the original album.

Banks later commented, "The Fugitive was a slightly different approach, where I sang everything. I wanted to do that once in my life! I purposely kept the vocal lines straightforward, so that I could sing them. The album has quite a strong instrumental bias, but it was a little more stark. I like the record very much."

== Release history ==
Country	Date	Label	Format	Catalogue number
United Kingdom	June 1983	Charisma	LP	812 383-1
United States	1983	Atlantic	LP	7 80071-1
Portugal	1983	PolyGram	LP	812 383-1
United Kingdom	late 80s	Virgin	CD	TBCD1
Russia	1999	ArsNova	Unofficial bootlegged CD	AN99-049
United Kingdom	2016	Esoteric Recordings	Remixed CD	ECLEC2533
United Kingdom	2016	Esoteric Recordings	2-Disc Remixed CD/5.1 DVD set	ECLEC22534
United Kingdom	2016	Esoteric Recordings	Remixed LP	ECLECLP2534

== Promotion ==
Upon release, the "This Is Love" single had a music video created to promote it. "And the Wheels Keep Turning" had no video, as Charisma Records chose not to commission one.

Marketing for the album relied heavily on Banks's fame as a member of Genesis, and the advertising slogan used in print ads stated simply "Tony Banks."

== Reception ==
Professional ratings
Review scores
Source	Rating
AllMusic	3/5 stars

In his retrospective review for AllMusic, Geoff Orens praised the album for being sparser and more accessible than most of Tony Banks's solo work. He also approved of his singing the songs himself, saying that his voice "works far better with his music than many of the other more bombastic vocalists he has recorded with as a solo artist." However, he commented that some of the songs have not aged well.

== Track listing ==
All tracks are written by Tony Banks.

Side one
No.	Title	Length
1.	"This Is Love"	5:11
2.	"Man of Spells"	3:46
3.	"And the Wheels Keep Turning"	4:48
4.	"Say You'll Never Leave Me"	4:32
5.	"Thirty Three's" (instrumental)	4:33

Side two
No.	Title	Length
6.	"By You"	4:29
7.	"At the Edge of Night"	6:03
8.	"Charm" (instrumental)	5:27
9.	"Moving Under"	6:01

Additional tracks

Bonus tracks on compact disc release
No.	Title	Length
10.	"K2"	3:59
11.	"Sometime Never"	3:41

Note

- There are extended versions of "This is Love" and "And the Wheels Keep Turning" on 12" singles. These have never been released on CD.

== Personnel ==
A promotional photograph of Tony Banks

Credits are adapted from the album's liner notes.

- Tony Banks – lead and backing vocals, keyboards, synth bass, Linn LM-1
- Daryl Stuermer – lead and rhythm guitars
- Mo Foster – bass guitars
- Tony Beard – drums (1, 4, 9)
- Steve Gadd – drums (2, 3, 6, 11), percussion (2, 3, 6, 11)
- Andy Duncan – drums (7, 8, 10)

== Production ==
- Tony Banks – producer
- Stephen Short – associate producer, engineer
- Geoff Callingham – technical assistance
- Dale Newman – equipment, food
- Clare Newman – equipment, food
- Bill Smith – cover design, photography

2016 Reissue

- Tony Banks – mixing
- Nick Davis – mixing
- Tom Mitchell – mix assistant

== Charts ==
Chart (1983)	Peak position
UK Albums (Official Charts)	50

== See also ==
- List of albums released in 1983
