= The Gift (Tony Banks song) =

1991 song by Tony Banks featuring Andy Taylor

Single by Tony Banks featuring Andy Taylor

from the album Still
- B-side: "Back to Back"
- Released: 22 July 1991
- Length: 3:56
- Label: Virgin
- Songwriter(s): Tony Banks
- Producer(s): Tony Banks; Nick Davis

Tony Banks singles chronology
"I Wanna Change the Score" (1991)	"The Gift" (1991)	"Still It Takes Me by Surprise" (1992)

"The Gift" is a song by English musician Tony Banks featuring English singer Andy Taylor (formerly of the Jazz Devils). It was released by Virgin on 22 July 1991 as the second single from Banks's third solo studio album, Still. The song was written by Banks and was produced by Banks and Nick Davis. It reached number 110 in the UK Singles Chart.

== Background ==
Tony Banks collaborated with Andy Taylor on two tracks for his solo album Still, with Taylor providing vocals on "The Gift" and "Still It Takes Me by Surprise". In a 2019 interview with Innerviews, Banks revealed, "I wanted someone with a voice like Ray Charles, but I couldn't find one at the time. So, I used Andy who wasn't really a great singer, but he had a sort of tone to his singing that worked quite well. I think the songs he [sang] stand up with his voice."

== Critical reception ==
Upon its release as a single, Fife Free Press noted that Banks and Taylor "dovetail to perfection on the catchily commercial 'The Gift'" and predicted it would be "another likely hit" for Banks. Marcus Hodge of the Cambridge Evening News was negative in his review, commenting, "Banks turns out a plodding, polite pub rock number that would have sounded out of date back in 1974. It's about time major labels began exercising some proper quality control."

== Track listing ==
7–inch single (UK)

1. "The Gift" (featuring Andy Taylor) – 3:56
2. "Back to Back" (featuring Jayney Klimek) – 4:30

12–inch single (UK)

1. "The Gift" – 3:56
2. "Back to Back" – 4:30
3. "A House Needs a Roof" (featuring Jayney Klimek) – 4:06

CD single (UK)

1. "The Gift" – 3:56
2. "I Wanna Change the Score" – 4:30
3. "A House Needs a Roof" – 4:06
4. "Redwing" – 5:38

== Personnel ==
"The Gift"

- Andy Taylor – vocals
- Daryl Stuermer – guitar
- Tony Banks – keyboards, bass synth, drum programming
- Vinnie Colaiuta – hi-hat, cymbals

"Back to Back"

- Jayney Klimek – vocals
- Daryl Stuermer – guitar
- Tony Banks – keyboards, bass synth
- Vinnie Colaiuta – drums

Production

- Nick Davis – production and engineering ("The Gift", "Back to Back", "I Wanna Change the Score")
- Tony Banks – production (all tracks)
- Steve Hillage – production ("A House Needs a Roof")
- Geoff Callingham – production assistance ("Redwing")
- Mark Robinson – assistant engineering ("The Gift", "Back to Back", "I Wanna Change the Score")

Other

- Carl Studna – photography
- Wherefore Art – design

== Charts ==
Chart (1991)	Peak position
UK Singles Chart (OCC)	110
UK Playlist Chart (Music Week)	58
