= The Wicked Lady (1983 film) =

1983 film

- Directed by: Michael Winner
- Written by: Leslie Arliss; Michael Winner additional dialogue Gordon Glennon; Aimée Stuart
- Based on: The Life and Death of the Wicked Lady Skelton by Magdalen King-Hall
- Produced by: Yoram Globus; Menahem Golan
- Starring: Faye Dunaway; Alan Bates; John Gielgud; Denholm Elliott
- Cinematography: Jack Cardiff
- Edited by: Michael Winner
- Music by: Tony Banks
- Production company: The Cannon Group
- Distributed by: Columbia-EMI-Warner Distributors (United Kingdom); MGM/UA (United States)
- Release date: 22 July 1983
- Running time: 98 minutes
- Countries: United Kingdom; United States
- Language: English
- Budget: $8 million (est.) or $15 million
- Box office: $724,912

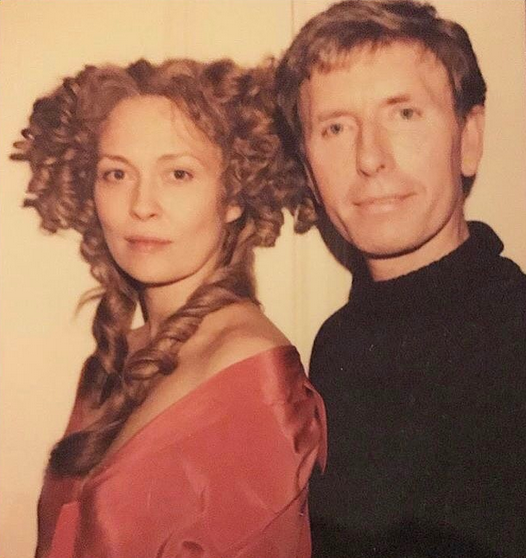
Faye Dunaway being fitted for a wig by Paul Huntley for the film.

The Wicked Lady is a 1983 British-American period drama directed by Michael Winner and starring Faye Dunaway, Alan Bates, John Gielgud, Denholm Elliott, and Hugh Millais. It was screened out of competition at the 1983 Cannes Film Festival. It is a remake of the 1945 film of the same name, which was one of the popular series of Gainsborough melodramas.

== Plot ==
Caroline is to be wed to Sir Ralph Skelton and invites her sister Barbara to be her bridesmaid. Barbara seduces Ralph, and marries him herself, but, despite her new wealthy situation, she gets bored and turns to highway robbery for thrills.

While on the road she meets a famous highwayman, Jerry Jackson, and they continue as a team, but some people begin suspecting her identity and she risks death if she continues her nefarious activities.

== Cast ==
- Faye Dunaway as Lady Barbara Skelton
- Alan Bates as Jerry Jackson
- John Gielgud as Hogarth
- Denholm Elliott as Sir Ralph Skelton
- Prunella Scales as Lady Kingsclere
- Oliver Tobias as Kit Locksby
- Glynis Barber as Caroline
- Joan Hickson as Aunt Agatha
- Helena McCarthy as Moll Skelton
- Mollie Maureen as Doll Skelton
- Derek Francis as Lord Kingsclere
- Marina Sirtis as Jackson's Girl
- Nicholas Gecks as Ned Cotterell
- Hugh Millais as Uncle Martin
- John Savident as Squire Thornton
- David Moreton as The Gardener
- Marc Sinden as Lord Dolman
- Mark Burns as King Charles II

== Production ==
=== Development ===
Michael Winner bought the rights to The Wicked Lady from the Rank Organisation and took the film to Faye Dunaway, who agreed to star in the leading role. Winner then raised financing from The Cannon Group in February 1982. In March 1982, John Gielgud and Alan Bates agreed to star and the budget was set at $15 million. Winner called the film "Bonnie and Clyde in the 17th century." In May, Dunaway also announced she would make a second film for Cannon, Duet for One, which would be directed by her then-boyfriend Terry O'Neill along with Dede Allen.

Menahem Golan of Cannon said that "stars who would never have worked with us before are now happy to sign. We pay them peanuts — but we give them big percentages. Faye, Alan and John were happy to sign for The Wicked Lady because they have 50% of the film. And we have small overheads, so they'll get their money." Dunaway said, "I really feel it will be a fun picture. A period romp, it's a mixture between Bonnie and Clyde and Tom Jones."

=== Shooting ===
"This is the only film I've ever enjoyed making," said Dunaway on set. "Everything I've done in the past has been so full of anguish, though that's partly my fault, I'm sure." She said the film "came at the right time for me. I needed something light after making Mommie Dearest, which was decidedly harrowing."

The actor Mark Burns appeared in The Wicked Lady as King Charles II, but during the filming director Winner could not afford to pay him even the Equity union minimum fee. Burns told him to make a donation to the Police Memorial Trust, which was run by Winner. Years later, when Burns appeared at a magistrate's court on a charge of speeding, Winner, appearing as a character witness, told the bench that the actor had given "his entire fee" for a major film to the fund and Burns was subsequently discharged.

=== Censorship ===
The film included a scene where Dunaway's character Lady Barbara Skelton has a whip fight with Jackson's Girl (Marina Sirtis). The British censor insisted this scene be cut lest the film be given an X certificate. Winner got various colleagues to watch the film and write letters of protest to the censor in support of the film and the scene. These included Derek Malcolm, Kingsley Amis, Lindsay Anderson, and Fay Weldon. Winner's appeal was successful and the film was released uncut.

== Reception ==
Dunaway received a nomination for the Golden Raspberry Award for Worst Actress at the 4th Golden Raspberry Awards. Audiences polled by CinemaScore gave the film an average grade of "D+" on an A+ to F scale.

== Soundtrack ==
The soundtrack for the film was composed by Genesis keyboardist Tony Banks.
