= Six Pieces for Orchestra =

Six Pieces For Orchestra

Studio album by Tony Banks
- Released: 26 March 2012
- Recorded: 13–17 March 2011
- Studio: Smécky Music Studios (Prague, Czech Republic)
- Genre: Classical
- Length: 51:42
- Label: Naxos Records
- Producer: Tony Banks; Nick Davis

Tony Banks chronology
Seven: A Suite for Orchestra (2004)	Six Pieces For Orchestra (2012)	A Chord Too Far (2015)

Six Pieces for Orchestra is the fifth studio album by English keyboardist and songwriter Tony Banks. It was released on 26 March 2012 on Naxos Records as his second album of classical music, following Seven: A Suite for Orchestra in 2004. The suite is performed by the City of Prague Philharmonic Orchestra and conducted by Paul Englishby. Two of the pieces feature soloists: Martin Robertson plays alto saxophone on "Siren", and Charlie Siem plays violin on "Blade".

The album is included in the 2024 boxset 18 Pieces for Orchestra 7–6–5 together with his other two classical albums.

== Background ==
Six Pieces for Orchestra is Banks's second album of classical music following his first, Seven: A Suite for Orchestra (2004). The idea to produce a follow-up originated when he had finished Seven as he had learned a lot from the project and felt he could produce "a more complete piece."

The City of Prague Philharmonic Orchestra was chosen for the project as its cheaper performance fee allowed for greater studio time than an orchestra based in England. Banks recorded Seven with the London Philharmonic Orchestra and felt a lack of excitement from the musicians and was faced with less rehearsal time, two things he saw little point to repeat for Six.

== Track listing ==
All tracks written by Tony Banks.

1. "Siren"
2. "Still Waters"
3. "Blade"
4. "Wild Pilgrimage"
5. "The Oracle"
6. "City of Gold"

== Personnel ==
- City of Prague Philharmonic Orchestra
- Martin Robertson – alto saxophone on "Siren"
- Charlie Siem – violin on "Blade"
- Paul Englishby – orchestration
- Tony Banks – composer, producer
- Nick Davis – producer, engineer
- Nick Wollage – engineer
- Colin Rae – editor, copyist
- Imagem Music – publisher
- Stefan Knapp – cover image
