= I Wanna Change the Score =

1991 song by Tony Banks and Nik Kershaw

Single by Tony Banks featuring Nik Kershaw

from the album Still
- B-side: "Hero for an Hour"
- Released: 7 May 1991
- Length: 4:29
- Label: Virgin
- Songwriter(s): Tony Banks; Nik Kershaw
- Producer(s): Tony Banks; Nick Davis

Tony Banks singles chronology
"Shortcut to Somewhere" (1986)	"I Wanna Change the Score" (1991)	"The Gift" (1991)

Nik Kershaw singles chronology
"Elisabeth's Eyes" (1989)	"I Wanna Change the Score" (1991)	"Wouldn't It Be Good" (1991)

"I Wanna Change the Score" is a song by English musician Tony Banks featuring English singer Nik Kershaw. It was released by Virgin on 7 May 1991 as the lead single from Banks's third solo studio album, Still. The song was written by Banks and Kershaw, and produced by Banks and Nick Davis. It reached number 76 in the UK Singles Chart.

== Background ==
Tony Banks collaborated with Nik Kershaw after getting in contact with him by phone. Banks became an admirer of Kershaw after getting a copy of his 1989 album The Works. He later recalled the album had "some wonderful stuff on it" and liked Kershaw's voice. Banks told Sound on Sound in 1991, "He was very enthusiastic about working with me, and it was nice that he decided to sing my songs, seeing as he'd never sung for anyone else." Kershaw co-wrote two tracks with Banks and provided vocals on them and another track for Banks' album Still: "Red Day on Blue Street", "I Wanna Change the Score" and "The Final Curtain".

== Release ==
Although Kershaw's name appeared alongside Banks's on the single's picture sleeve, it was omitted on the vinyl's label by Virgin Records. Banks told Simon Mayo in 1991, "I wanted to have the [single] as 'Nik Kershaw with Tony Banks' but the record company said people would probably think it was Nik's record anyway and they were worried it might not be associated with the [new] album. But they weren't supposed to go as far as leaving his name off!"

== Music video ==
The song's music video was directed by Nick Willing. It features Banks and Kershaw performing the song as the background changes to show them in different locations and settings.

== Critical reception ==
Upon its release as a single, Music & Media called "I Wanna Change the Score" a "catchy track". Andrew Hirst of the Huddersfield Daily Examiner noted that the "artful chorus is badly let down by the bland bits inbetween". Marcus Hodge of the Cambridge Evening News commented, "Kershaw sounds remarkably like his protege, Chesney Hawkes, but he seems to have given Chesney his best song as this is quite dreary." South Wales Echo gave a one out of five star rating and wrote, "The score is nil-nil, both deserve the red card for taking part in this meaningless MOR friendly."

== Track listing ==
7–inch single (UK and Europe) and cassette single (UK)

1. "I Wanna Change the Score" – 4:29
2. "Hero for an Hour" – 4:41

12–inch single (UK and Europe)

1. "I Wanna Change the Score" – 4:29
2. "Hero for an Hour" – 4:41
3. "Big Man" – 4:10

CD single (UK)

1. "I Wanna Change the Score" – 4:29
2. "Hero for an Hour" – 4:41
3. "Big Man" – 4:10
4. "The Waters of Lethe" – 6:31

CD single (Japan)

1. "I Wanna Change the Score" – 4:29
2. "Hero for an Hour" – 4:41

== Personnel ==
"I Wanna Change the Score"

- Nik Kershaw – vocals
- Daryl Stuermer – guitar
- Tony Banks – keyboards
- James Eller – bass
- Graham Broad – drums
- Luís Jardim – percussion

"Hero for an Hour"

- Tony Banks – vocals, keyboards, bass synth
- Daryl Stuermer – guitar
- Martin Robertson – saxophone
- Vinnie Colaiuta – drums
- Luís Jardim – percussion

Production

- Tony Banks – production (all tracks)
- Nick Davis – production and engineering ("I Wanna Change the Score", "Hero for an Hour")
- Mark Robinson – assistant engineering ("I Wanna Change the Score", "Hero for an Hour")
- Steve Hillage – production ("Big Man")
- Steve Chase – engineering ("Big Man")
- David Hentschel – production and engineering ("The Waters of Lethe")
- David Bascombe – engineering ("The Waters of Lethe")

Other

- Carl Studna – photography
- Wherefore Art – design

== Charts ==
Chart (1991)	Peak position
Germany (GfK)	55
UK Singles Chart (OCC)	76
UK Music Week Playlist Chart	32
