= Flowers for Algernon =

1959 novelette and 1966 novel by Daniel Keyes

- The dust jacket of the novel’s first edition
- Author: Daniel Keyes
- Language: English
- Genre: Science fiction Tragedy
- Publisher: Harcourt, Brace & World
- Publication date: April 1959 (novelette); March 1966 (novel)
- Publication place: United States
- Media type: Print (hardback & paperback)
- Pages: 26 (novelette); 311 (novel)
- Awards: Hugo Award for Best Short Fiction (1960); Nebula Award for Best Novel (1967)
- ISBN: 0-15-131510-8
- OCLC: 232370

Flowers for Algernon is a short novelette by American author Daniel Keyes, which he later expanded into a novel and adapted for film and other media. The novelette, written in 1958 and first published in the April 1959 issue of The Magazine of Fantasy & Science Fiction, won the Hugo Award for Best Short Fiction in 1960. The novel was published in 1966 and was joint winner of that year's Nebula Award for Best Novel, with Babel-17.

Algernon is a laboratory mouse who has undergone surgery to increase his intelligence. The story is told by a series of progress reports written by Charlie Gordon, the first human subject for the surgery. It touches on ethical and moral themes, such as the treatment of the mentally disabled.

Although the book has often been challenged for removal from libraries in the United States and Canada, sometimes successfully, it is frequently taught in schools around the world and has been adapted many times for television, theater, radio and as the Academy Award-winning film Charly (1968).

== History ==
=== Background ===
The ideas for Flowers for Algernon developed over 14 years and were inspired by events in Keyes' life, starting in 1945 with his conflict with his parents, who were pushing a pre-medical education despite his desire to pursue a writing career. Keyes felt that his education was driving a wedge between himself and his parents, and this led him to wonder what would happen if it were possible to increase a person's intelligence. Based on these considerations, Keyes further developed his ideas for Flowers for Algernon by transforming the initial concept into what Keyes asserted as "a classic tragedy".

Keyes, in his 1999 memoir Algernon, Charlie and I: A Writer's Journey, explains more about his creative writing process and relates key insights for the conception of Flowers for Algernon. He said that he was inspired by Aristotle's dictum in the Poetics, which states that a tragedy can only occur for the highborn, because one could only have a tragic fall from a great height. Keyes' thought was: "let's test that". Therefore, he made his story's main character a person who was initially "lowborn", a mentally disabled young man, who then became a "highborn" after the intelligence-enhancing procedures. Keyes' goal was to elevate such a character to the heights of genius at the cost of being disconnected before having them lose it all.

A pivotal moment occurred in 1957, while Keyes was teaching English to students with disabilities, and one of them asked if it would be possible for the student to be put into an ordinary class (mainstreamed) if he worked hard and became smart. Keyes also witnessed the dramatic change in another learning-disabled student who regressed after he was removed from regular lessons. Keyes said that "When he came back to school, he had lost it all. He could not read. He reverted to what he had been. It was a heart-breaker."

Characters in the book were based on people in Keyes' life. The character of Algernon was inspired by a university dissection class, and the name was inspired by the poet Algernon Charles Swinburne. Nemur and Strauss, the scientists who develop the intelligence-enhancing surgery in the story, were based on professors Keyes met while in graduate school. Events that Charlie experiences were also based on Keyes' life, including the Rorschach test and Charlie's frustration with it, which was inspired by Keyes' past experience with the test when he was exploring the causes of his anxiety as a college student. As he was developing his story, Keyes satirically transformed his frustrating Tests and Measurements advisor into Burt, the tester who similarly frustrates Charlie.

In 1958, Keyes was approached by Galaxy Science Fiction magazine to write a story, at which point the elements of Flowers for Algernon fell into place. When the story was submitted to Galaxy, editor Horace Gold suggested changing the ending so that Charlie retained his intelligence, married Alice Kinnian, and lived happily ever after. Keyes refused to make the change and sold the story to The Magazine of Fantasy & Science Fiction instead.

Keyes worked on the expanded novel between 1962 and 1965 and first tried to sell it to Doubleday, but they also wanted to change the ending. Keyes again refused and gave Doubleday back their advance. Five publishers rejected the story over the course of a year, until it was published by Harcourt in 1966.

=== Publication ===
The 26-page novelette "Flowers for Algernon" was first published as the lead story in the April 1959 issue of The Magazine of Fantasy & Science Fiction. It was later reprinted in The Best from Fantasy and Science Fiction, 9th series (1960), the Fifth Annual of the Year's Best Science Fiction (1960), Best Articles and Stories (1961), Literary Cavalcade (1961), The Science Fiction Hall of Fame, Volume One, 1929–1964 (1970), and The Magazine of Fantasy & Science Fiction: A 30-Year Retrospective (1980).

The Magazine of Fantasy & Science Fiction reprinted the original novelette as part of its 30th anniversary October 1979 issue. They reprinted it again in its May 2000 issue along with an essay titled "Algernon, Charlie and I: A Writer's Journey" by the author. That magazine's cover announced the combination with "Flowers for Algernon / Daniel Keyes / the story and its origin".

The expanded novel was first published in 1966 by Harcourt Brace with the Bantam paperback following in 1968. As of 1997, the novel had not been out of print since its publication. By 2004, it had been translated into 27 languages, published in 30 countries and sold more than 5 million copies.

== Synopsis ==
The novelette and the novel share many similar plot points, but the novel expands significantly on Charlie's developing emotional state as well as his intelligence, his memories of childhood, and the relationship with his family. Both are presented as a series of journal entries ("progress reports") written by the protagonist, Charlie Gordon. The style, grammar, spelling, and punctuation of these reports reflect changes in his mental and emotional growth.

=== Novelette ===
Charlie Gordon is a 37-year-old man with an IQ of 68, who works a menial job as a janitor at a factory. (Note: Charlie's age is 37 in the novelette and 32 in the novel.) At his job, his main "friends" are his colleagues, Joe Carp and Frank Reilly, who frequently bully and mock him. Charlie attends a literacy program taught by Ms. Kinnian in hopes of improving his intelligence, and is selected to undergo an experimental surgical technique to increase it. The technique has already been tested on a number of animals; the great success was with Algernon, a laboratory mouse. Although these events proved fruitful, the procedure's full results were unknown. Charlie's surgery is a success, and his IQ triples.

With an increased intelligence, Charlie realizes that his colleagues at the factory, who he thought were his friends, only liked having him around so they could tease him. Charlie's new intelligence frightens his colleagues, and they start a petition to have him fired. Additionally, Charlie's perspective on his professors shifts as he recognizes that Dr. Nemur is only using Charlie to advance his scientific career, instead of altruistically helping Charlie become smarter.

Later on, Charlie is horrified when he realizes he has joined in the mocking of a 16-year-old imbecile dishwasher at the local diner, and lashes out at the patrons to the boy's defense, ashamed that he would allowed himself to forget his past poor treatment. Charlie dedicates himself to increasing human intelligence levels. As Charlie's intelligence peaks, Algernon's suddenly declines. The mouse loses his increased intelligence and dies afterward. Charlie buries him in the backyard of his home.

Charlie realizes his intelligence increase is also temporary and that his fate will mirror Algernon's. As the effects of his mental deterioration become more evident, Charlie finds flaws in the experiment, which he calls the "Algernon–Gordon Effect". By the time Charlie finishes his work, his intelligence has regressed to its original state.

Charlie is aware of and pained by what is happening to him as he loses his knowledge. Charlie resumes his old job as a janitor at the factory and tries to go back to how things used to be, but he cannot stand the pity and guilt from those around him, including his co-workers, his landlady, and Ms. Kinnian. Charlie states he plans to "go away" from New York, and his last wish is for someone to put flowers on Algernon's grave.

=== Novel ===
The novel opens with an epigraph taken from Book VII of Plato's The Republic:

Anyone who has common sense will remember that the bewilderments of the eye are of two kinds, and arise from two causes, either from coming out of the light or from going into the light, which is true of the mind's eye, quite as much as of the bodily eye.

Charlie Gordon, 32 years old, demonstrates an IQ of 68. His uncle has arranged for him to hold a menial job at a bakery so that he will not have to live at the Warren State Home and Training School, a state institution. Desiring to improve himself, Charlie attends reading and writing classes, taught by Miss Alice Kinnian, at the Beekman College Center for Retarded Adults. Two researchers at Beekman, Professor Nemur and Dr. Strauss, are looking for a human test subject on whom to try a new surgical technique intended to increase intelligence. They have already performed the surgery on a mouse named Algernon, resulting in a dramatic improvement in his mental performance. Based on Alice's recommendation and his motivation to improve, Nemur and Strauss choose Charlie over smarter pupils to undergo the procedure.

The operation is successful, and Charlie's IQ reaches 185 within the next three months. He begins recalling his childhood, and remembers that his mother Rose physically abused him and wasted money on fake treatments for his disability, while his younger sister Norma resented him. As Charlie's intelligence, education, and understanding of the world increase, his relationships with people deteriorate. His colleagues at the bakery, who used to amuse themselves at his expense, now fear and resent his increased intelligence, and persuade his boss to fire him.

Alice enters a relationship with Charlie, but breaks up with him after she realizes that she can no longer relate to him, and claims that his intelligence has changed his personality. Later, Charlie loses trust in Dr. Strauss and particularly Dr. Nemur, believing that they considered him a laboratory subject and not a human before the operation. While at a scientific convention in Chicago, Charlie feels humiliated when he is treated like an experiment, and flees with Algernon in retaliation.

After moving to Manhattan with Algernon, Charlie becomes involved in a relationship with Fay Lillman, his neighbor, which quells his loneliness. After an incident with a disabled busboy, Charlie becomes inspired to continue to improve Nemur and Strauss's experiment and applies for a grant. However, he notices Algernon is beginning to behave erratically. In his research, Charlie discovers a flaw behind Nemur and Strauss' procedure that indicates he might lose his intelligence and possibly regress back to his previous state. Before that happens, Charlie publishes his findings as the "Algernon–Gordon effect", as Algernon dies.

As Charlie begins to regress to his former mental state, he finds closure with his family. His mother Rose, who still lives in the family's old home in Brooklyn, has developed dementia and recognizes him only briefly. His father Matt, who broke off contact with the family years earlier, does not recognize him at all. Charlie is only able to reconnect with his sister Norma, who is now caring for Rose in their newly depressed neighborhood, but he declines to stay with them.

Charlie begins dating Alice again, but his frustration with declining intelligence eventually causes him to end his relationships with her and Dr. Strauss. Unable to bear the thought of being dependent and pitied by his friends and co-workers, Charlie decides to live at the Warren State Home and Training School, where nobody knows about the operation. In a final postscript to his writings, Charlie requests that someone put flowers on Algernon's grave in the backyard of Charlie's former residence.

== Style ==
Both the novel and the novelette are written in an epistolary style collecting together Charlie's personal "progress reports" from a few days before the operation, until he regresses back to his original state almost five months later. Initially, the reports are filled with elementary spelling errors and awkwardly constructed sentences, reflecting the writing of a young child. The story is told from Charlie's point of view, in a first-person perspective, allowing the reader to see through Charlie's eyes and hear each thought.

Keyes shares the importance of this in his memoir, "This had to be told from Charlie's perspective. It had to be first person, major character angle—in Charlie's mind and through Charlie's eyes all the way." Charlie's mild intellectual disability initially makes him an unreliable narrator who presents the story through an immature worldview; his low intelligence compromises his ability to understand the world around him. This results in a case of dramatic irony, as readers are often more aware of Charlie's situation than he is.

Following the operation, the reports begin to show marked improvements in spelling, grammar, punctuation, and diction, indicating a rise in his intelligence. As his intelligence improves, Charlie's perception broadens, and he realizes that things are entirely different than he had perceived them to be. Charlie's awareness increases to match that of the reader's and quickly surpasses it. This transforms him into a reliable narrator, able to provide all relevant information accurately.

Charlie's regression is conveyed by the loss of these skills. In his final state, Charlie returns to a state of unreliability, his ability to accurately narrate events diminished by the regression. The polar differences in writing style emphasise the changes Charlie experiences from the operation, and take the reader along with Charlie's arc and growth/regression, and support the foil throughout the story.

== Themes ==
Key themes in Flowers for Algernon include the treatment of the mentally disabled, the impact conflicts between intellect and emotion have upon happiness, and how past events can influence a person later in life. Algernon is an example of a story that incorporates the science-fiction theme of uplift.

== Reception and legacy ==
Algis Budrys of Galaxy Science Fiction praised Flowers for Algernon's realistic depiction of people as "rounded characters". Stating in August 1966 that Keyes had published little fiction and whether he would publish more was unknown, he concluded "If this is a beginning, then what a beginning it is, and if it is the high point in a very short career, then what a career". In February 1967 Budrys named the book the best novel of the year.

=== Awards ===
The original novelette won the Hugo Award for Best Short Fiction in 1960. The expanded novel was joint winner of the Nebula Award for Best Novel in 1966, tied with Babel-17 by Samuel R. Delany, and was nominated for the Hugo Award for Best Novel in 1967, losing out to The Moon Is a Harsh Mistress by Robert A. Heinlein.

In the late 1960s, the Science Fiction Writers of America (SFWA) decided to give Nebula Awards retroactively and voted for their favorite science fiction stories of the era ending December 31, 1964, before the Nebula Award was conceived. The novelette version of Flowers for Algernon was voted third out of 132 nominees and was published in The Science Fiction Hall of Fame, Volume One, 1929–1964 in 1970. Keyes was elected the SFWA Author Emeritus in 2000 for making a significant contribution to science fiction and fantasy, primarily as a result of Flowers for Algernon.

=== Censorship ===
Flowers for Algernon is on the American Library Association's list of the 100 Most Frequently Challenged Books of 1990–1999 at number 43. The reasons for the challenges vary, but usually center on those parts of the novel in which Charlie struggles to understand and express his sexual desires. Many of the challenges have proved unsuccessful, but the book has occasionally been removed from school libraries, including some in Pennsylvania and Texas.

=== Influence ===
Flowers for Algernon has been the inspiration for works that include the album A Curious Feeling by Genesis keyboardist Tony Banks. It inspired the 2006 modern dance work Holeulone by Karine Pontiès, which won the Prix de la Critique de la Communauté française de Belgique for best dance piece. A 2001 episode of the TV series The Simpsons titled "HOMR" has a plot similar to the novel.

The 2012 film The Bourne Legacy features a mentally disabled soldier who is reliant on an experimental medication to raise and maintain his intelligence, and much of the action centering on how to secure a supply of said medication. One scene specifically captures his fear of slipping back to his former state in a similar manner to Charlie.

A 2013 episode of the TV series It's Always Sunny in Philadelphia titled "Flowers for Charlie" is heavily based on the novel.

== Adaptations ==
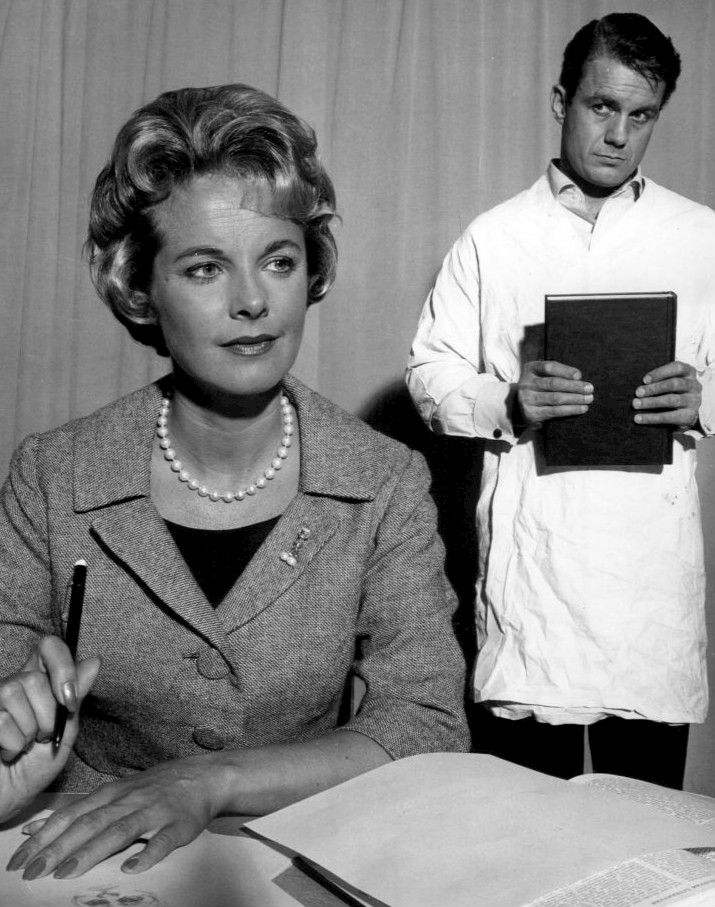
Mona Freeman (Alice) and Cliff Robertson (Charlie Gordon) in "The Two Worlds of Charlie Gordon", a 1961 presentation of The United States Steel Hour. Robertson reprised his role in the film Charly.

Flowers for Algernon has been adapted many times for different media including stage, screen, and radio. These adaptations, as well as other media which have referenced it, include:

- A 1961 episode of the television drama The United States Steel Hour, "The Two Worlds of Charlie Gordon", starring Cliff Robertson and Mona Freeman.
- A 1968 film, Charly, also starring Cliff Robertson, for which he won the Academy Award for Best Actor.
- A 1969 stage play, Flowers for Algernon by David Rogers.
- A 1978 stage musical, Charlie and Algernon by David Rogers and Charles Strouse.
- A 1979 concept album, A Curious Feeling by Tony Banks, is a loose adaptation, originally planned as a more faithful one.
- A 1991 radio play, Flowers for Algernon, for BBC Radio 4 starring Tom Courtenay.
- A 2000 television film, Flowers for Algernon, starring Matthew Modine.
- A 2001 Spider-Man comic story, "Flowers for Rhino", by Peter Milligan and Duncan Fregredo.
- A 2001 episode of the television series The Simpsons, "HOMR".
- A 2002 Japanese drama, Algernon ni Hanataba o for Fuji Television, starring Yūsuke Santamaria.
- A 2006 episode of the television series, Frisky Dingo, "Flowers for Nearl".
- A 2013 episode of the television series It's Always Sunny in Philadelphia, "Flowers for Charlie".
- A 2013 episode of the television series The League, "Flowers for Taco".
- A 2015 Japanese drama, Algernon ni Hanataba o for Tokyo Broadcasting System, starring Yamashita Tomohisa and Chiaki Kuriyama.
- A 2020 episode of the television series Curb Your Enthusiasm, "Beep Panic".

Further stage and radio adaptations have been produced in France (1982), Ireland (1983), Australia (1984), Poland (1985), Japan (1987, 1990), and Czechoslovakia (1988).

== See also ==
- Mrs. Frisby and the Rats of NIMH — A story about rats with increased intelligence

== Sources ==
- Bujalski, Andrew (2002). Aglietti, Boomie; Quinio, Dennis (eds.). Flowers for Algernon: Daniel Keyes. Spark. ISBN 1-58663-514-X.
- Coules, Bert (1993). The Play of Daniel Keyes' Flowers for Algernon (including notes by Robert Chambers). Heinemann. ISBN 0-435-23293-2.
- Hill, Cheryl (2004). "A History of Daniel Keyes' Flowers for Algernon" (PDF). LIBR 548F: History of the Book. Archived from the original (PDF) on February 21, 2007.
- Keyes, Daniel (1999). Algernon, Charlie and I: A Writer's Journey. Boca Raton, FL: Challcrest Press Books. ISBN 1-929519-00-1.
- Scholes, Robert (1975). Structural Fabulation: An Essay on Fiction of the Future. Notre Dame, IN: University of Notre Dame Press. ISBN 0-268-00570-2.
- Silverberg, Robert, ed. (1970). The Science Fiction Hall of Fame, Volume One, 1929–1964. Tom Doherty Associates. ISBN 0-7653-0537-2.
- "Flowers For Algernon". The Encyclopedia of Science Fiction.
