= Alf Klimek =

Australian musician (born 1956)

- Birth name: Alfons Joseph Klimek
- Also known as: Alf Klimax
- Born: 3 February 1956 (age 69); Melbourne, Victoria, Australia
- Occupation(s): Musician, singer, actor, producer, writer
- Instrument(s): guitar, programmer
- Years active: 1977–present

Alfons Joseph "Alf" Klimek (born 3 February 1956) is an Australian musician. During the 1980s he was based in Berlin as a singer-songwriter for Spliff (as Alf Klimax, 1980–83) and The Other Ones (1984–90). That group included his younger twin siblings, Johnny and Jayney. In 1987, they had two hit singles, "Holiday" and "We Are What We Are", which charted in both Germany and the United States.

== Biography ==
Alfons Joseph Klimek was born on 3 February 1956 and grew up in Melbourne. His father, Alfons Klimek snr (died 1998), and mother, Luisa née Cester (born January 1916) had eight children: Eugenia, Lydia, Naomi (born 1953), Greta, Alfons jnr, Robert, and the twins Johnny and Jayney (born August 1962). The Klimek family had lived in various Melbourne suburbs including Kew, Oakleigh and, from 1969, Clayton. Klimek's younger cousins, Nic and Chris Cester, were founding mainstays of Australian hard rockers, Jet (2001–12).

In June 1977, Klimek joined the Stuffed Puppets under the guidance of Neville Tranter as a puppeteer and comedy script writer. The group flew to Amsterdam to take part in the Festival of Fools. In 1979 he left the puppeteers and joined a cabaret group, The Busby Berkeleys, writing shows and performing in Europe and in New York City. A year later he joined the ex-Nina Hagen Band in Berlin, Germany, which was renamed as Spliff. He was the group's front-man and co-writer for their debut album, Spliff Radio Show (1980).

Klimek returned to Australia and joined his youngest brother, Johnny. Together they returned to Berlin in 1983 and, when joined by their sister Jayney, started a pop group, The Other Ones, with three local musicians. In 1987, they had two hit singles, "Holiday" and "We Are What We Are", which charted in Germany and the United States. "Holiday" peaked at number 29 on the US Billboard Hot 100 chart. It reached number four in Germany, number 10 in New Zealand, number 13 in Austria and number 22 in Switzerland.

Klimek left The Other Ones in 1990, he moved his home base several times between Berlin and Melbourne. He co-owned a studio, Birdland, with producer Lindsay Gravina and worked in event musicals. In 1998 he was asked by Klaus Baumgart to create a series of musical and audio-book productions for the Laura's Star series for Bauhaus Verlag in Germany and later Lübbe Verlag also in Germany.

2011... He wrote the theatre play "Lauras Sternreise das Musikal" for Meistersinger Productions which played for two years to an average audience of 1200 per show.

2015 ... He wrote and produced the "Dream Baby Dreams" album. Music for newborn babies using White and Pink noise, heartbeats, natural sounds and Isochronic Tones to help re-create the feeling of a baby being in the womb whilst putting it all to classical music.

2016 ... saw the release of Tai Chi Dreams, based upon the Dream Baby Dreams music but suitable for tai chi routines under the guidance of tai chi master Tara Brayshaw.
