= Jayney Klimek =

Australian singer-songwriter

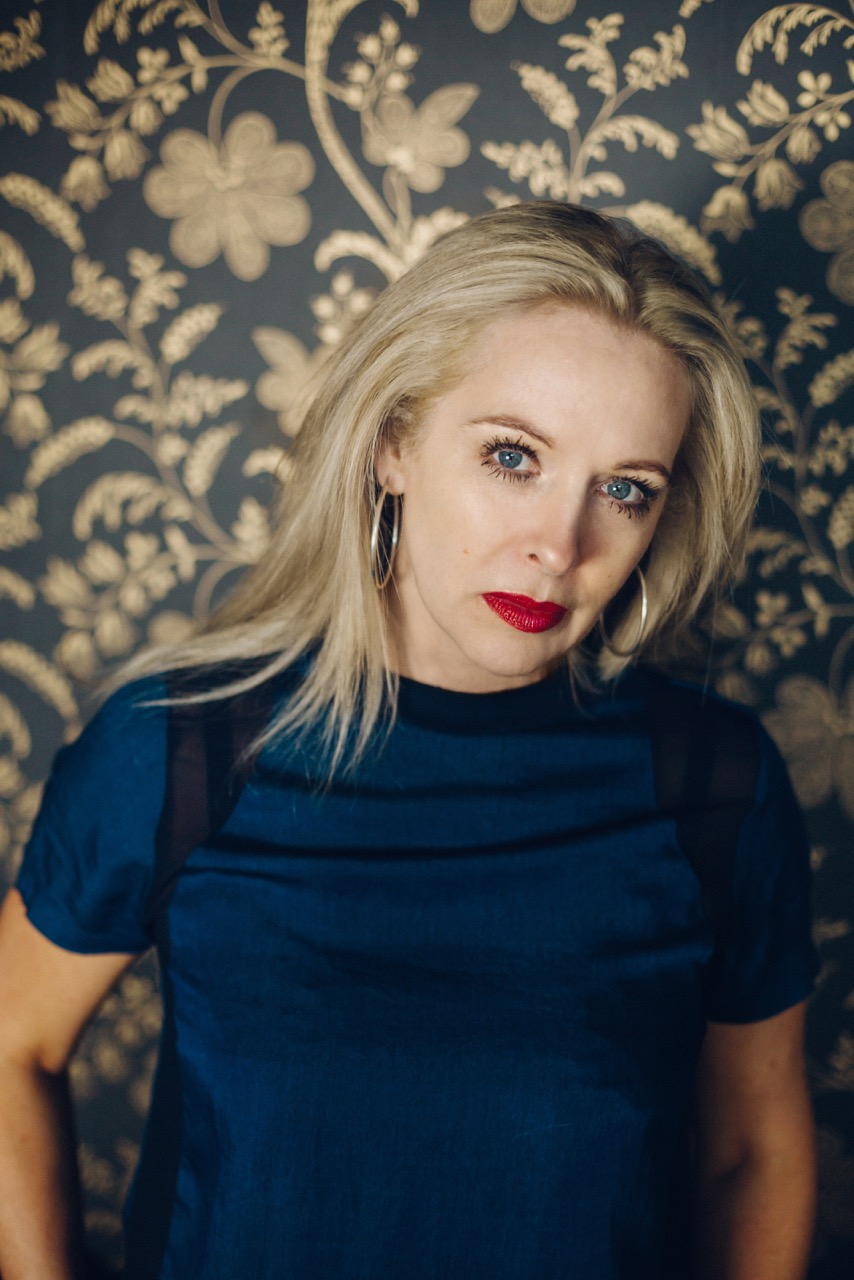

Background information
- Born: Jayney Miriam Klimek; 18 August 1962 (age 63); Melbourne, Victoria, Australia
- Origin: Berlin, Germany
- Occupation: Musician
- Instrument: Vocals
- Years active: 1983–present

Jayney Miriam Klimek (born 18 August 1962 in Melbourne, Australia) is an Australian singer-songwriter based in Berlin.

== Early years ==
Jayney Miriam Klimek was born on 18 August 1962 and grew up in Melbourne. Her father, Alfons Klimek, and mother, Luisa née Cester (born January 29, 1916) had eight children: Eugenia, Lydia, Naomi, Greta, Alfons junior (born February 1956), Robert, and Jayney and her twin brother, Johnny. Johnny is a successful Hollywood composer. Their cousins Nic Cester and Chris Cester are founding mainstays of Australian hard rockers, Jet. Klimek studied classical singing and acting at the National Theatre, Melbourne and at John Gauci School of Film. In 1984 she relocated to Berlin to join her two brothers, Alf and Johnny, where they had formed The Other Ones with three local musicians.

== Music career ==
Jayney achieved chart success with The Other Ones. "Holiday" spent 20 weeks in the European Top Ten.

Collaborations include work with Tony Banks on two of his solo albums Bankstatement and Still, Tangerine Dream (vocal arrangements for songs "Chasing The Bad Seed", "All The Steps To Heaven" and "Blinded By The World's Desire" for the album Purgatorio and vocals on Inferno), Paul van Dyk, Alphaville, the French band from Bordeaux XII Alfonso. Jayney co-wrote and performed lead vocals on Digital Tenderness Terranova.

In 2005 she formed You Pretty Thing with Andreas Schwarz-Ruszczynski. Their single "Push It" has become the longest running No.1 played track on RadioEins.

In 2014 she released her first solo album "Awake" on Inflatable Records. The album was recorded in Berlin and London and produced by Gareth Jones (Depeche Mode, Erasure, Einstürzende Neubauten).

== Film career ==
In 2016 Jayney made her acting debut in the Austrian film de:Hotel Rock’n’Roll.

== Discography ==
- 1989 : Bankstatement from Tony Banks - Vocals on Queen of Darkness, That Night and A House Needs a Roof
- 1991 : Still from Tony Banks - Vocals on Water Out of Wine and Back to Back
- 1995 : Divamania (Berlin's Best Women In The House) Various artists - On Fly
- 2001 : Der Kleine Eisbär - Der Soundtrack Zum Kinofilm Various artists - On Lonely
- 2002 : Inferno from Tangerine Dream - Alto vocals
- 2004 : Purgatorio from Tangerine Dream - Vocal arrangements
- 2014 : Awake as herself
