= Tony Banks (musician) =

British musician (born 1950)

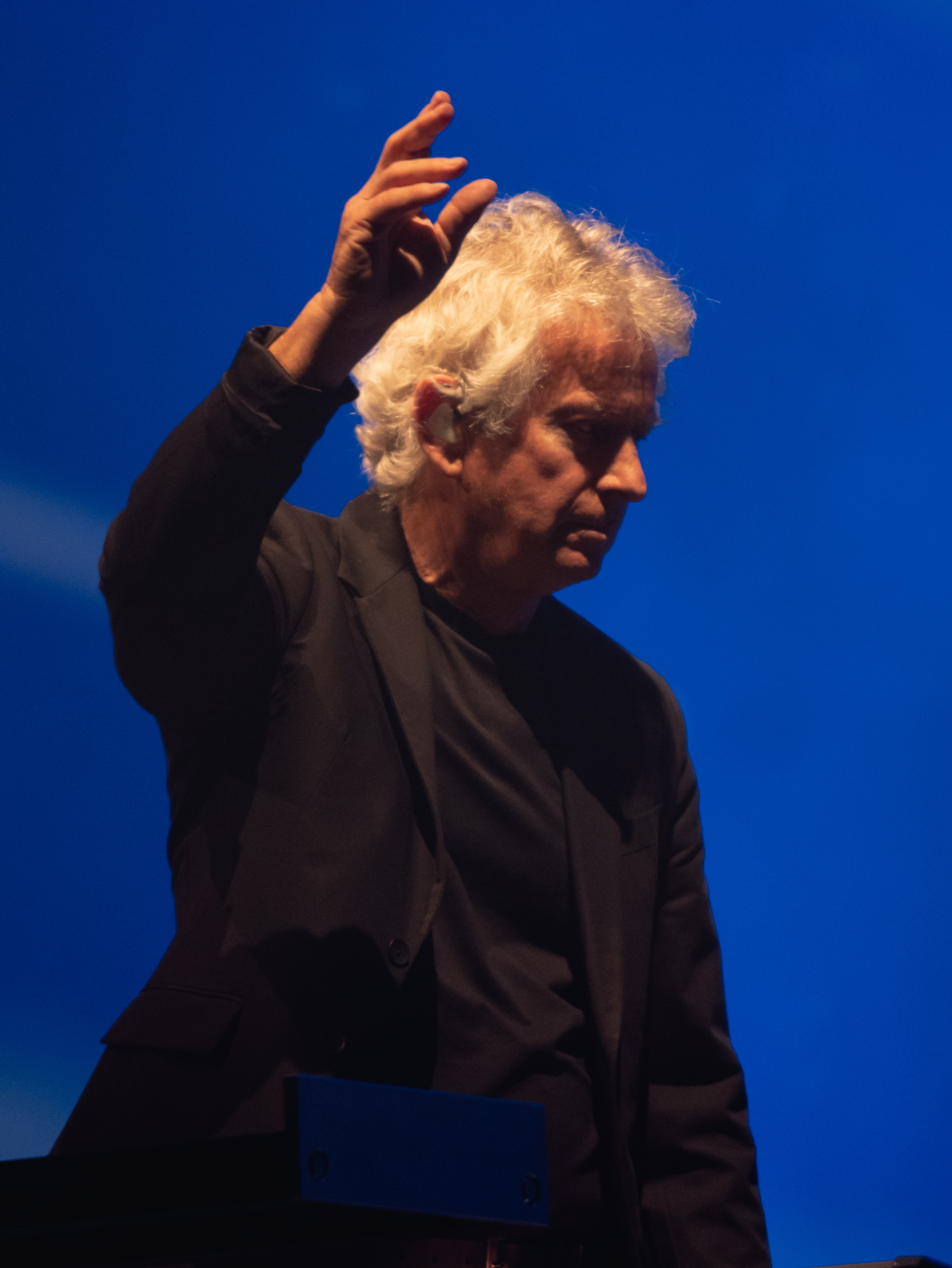
- Banks performing with Genesis in 2022

Background information
- Born: Anthony George Banks; 27 March 1950 (age 76); East Hoathly with Halland, England
- Genres: Progressive rock; classical; rock; art rock; pop rock
- Occupations: Musician; songwriter; composer
- Instrument: Keyboards
- Years active: 1967–present
- Labels: Charisma; Polydor; Virgin; Atlantic; Giant; Reprise
- Formerly of: Genesis; Bankstatement; Strictly Inc
- Website: genesis-music.com

Anthony George Banks (born 27 March 1950) is an English musician primarily known as the keyboardist and founding member of the rock band Genesis. Banks is also a prolific solo artist, releasing six solo studio albums that range through progressive rock, pop, and classical music.

Banks co-founded Genesis in 1967 while studying at Charterhouse. He was their keyboardist and one of their principal songwriters and lyricists. He became a frequent user of the Hammond T-102 organ, Mellotron, ARP Pro Soloist and Yamaha CP-70 piano. In the band's earliest years Banks would play acoustic guitar for some of the mellow and pastoral songs.

In 2010, Banks was inducted into the Rock and Roll Hall of Fame as a member of Genesis. In 2011, he was included on MusicRadar's list of the 27 greatest keyboard players of all time. In 2015, he was named "Prog God" at the Progressive Music Awards.

== Early life ==
Anthony George Banks was born on 27 March 1950 in East Hoathly with Halland, East Sussex as the youngest of five children. He cites his mother, a pianist, as being particularly into music, and first listened to classical music albums that she owned from around six before he moved to musical theatre compositions by Rodgers and Hammerstein. Banks's elder brother introduced him to a wider variety, naming "Sixteen Tons" sung by Frankie Laine as one of the songs, and said, "By 1961, and for the next five to six years, I was music mad!" Banks started piano lessons at school at eight with the headmaster's wife, but did not enjoy tuition at first because he was "quite forced into it" by his parents until he grew to enjoy it. He considered himself an average piano player, and learned to play pieces by Sergei Rachmaninoff and Maurice Ravel, his two favourite piano composers, by ear. At 13, he began lessons with an unsuitable teacher who made him lose interest in classical music, but he then started to play songs by ear that he heard on the radio. Months later, he acquired a new piano teacher who sparked his interest in classical compositions once more, which became a deciding factor for Banks's decision to pursue a career in music. In addition to the piano, Banks taught himself to play the guitar.

At seven, Banks began six years of study at Boarzell Preparatory School, a boarding school in Hurst Green. In September 1963, Banks began study at Charterhouse School, a private school in Godalming, Surrey. He studied classical piano as an extracurricular subject. Shortly after his arrival he befriended fellow pupil and future Genesis bandmate Peter Gabriel, initially over their general distaste for the school's environment. They went on to play in Garden Wall, a school band with drummer Chris Stewart. In early 1967, they merged with guitarists Mike Rutherford and Anthony Phillips, two members of Anon, another school band, to record a series of demos which led to the formation of their new band Genesis.

Banks originally planned to study mathematics in higher education. After leaving Charterhouse, Banks began studying chemistry at Sussex University but soon switched to physics and philosophy. After a year at Sussex, he took a leave of absence in 1969 to explore a career with Genesis since the group had split but decided to reform and become a full-time professional band. Banks never returned to the university.

== Career ==
=== 1967–2007: Genesis ===
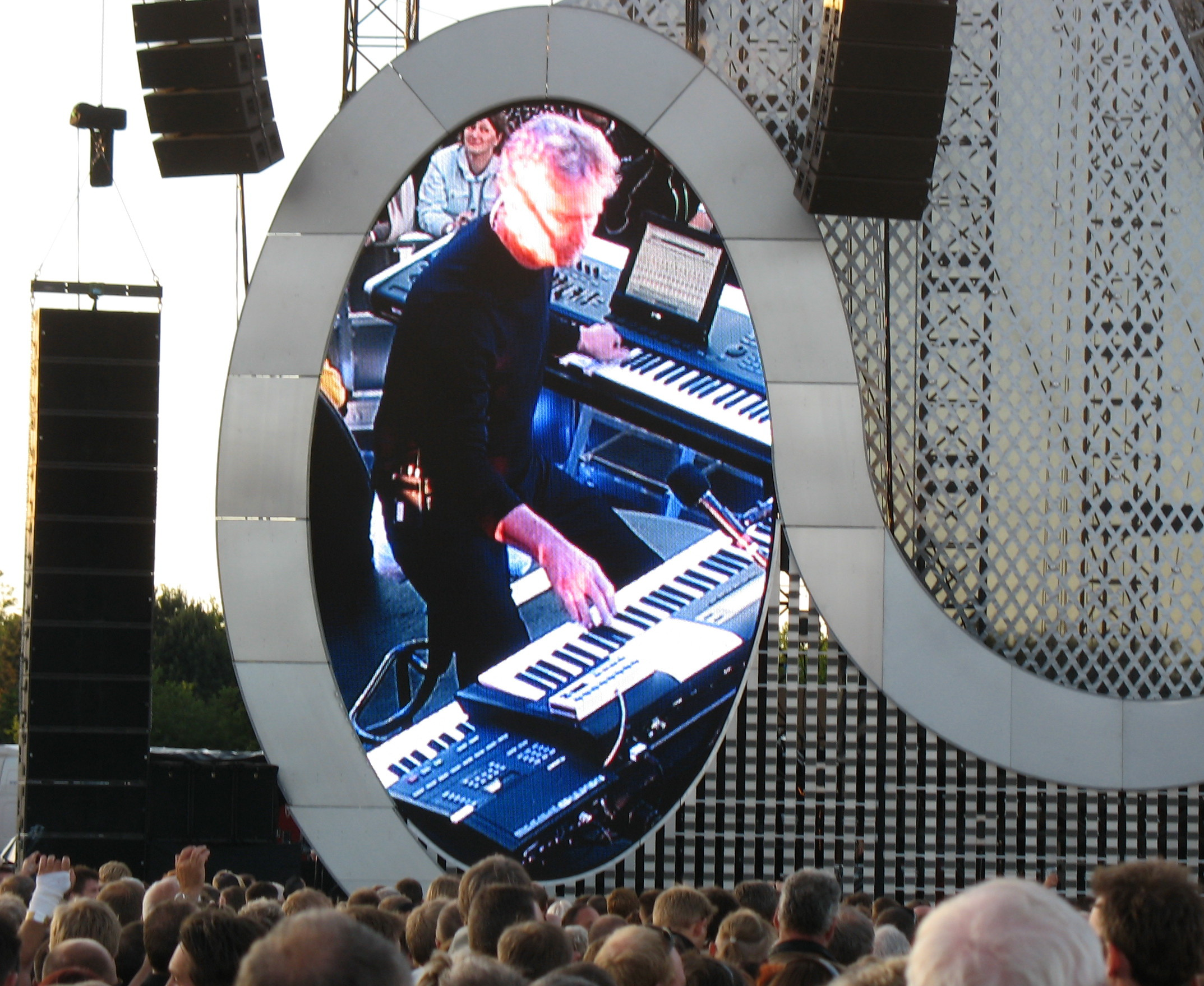
Banks performing with Genesis in 2007

Banks's elaborate arrangements and keyboard solos (such as the piano introduction to "Firth of Fifth" and the instrumental sections of "The Cinema Show", "Watcher of the Skies", and "Supper's Ready") helped to establish Genesis's sound. In addition to playing keyboards, Banks contributed (along with Anthony Phillips, Steve Hackett and Mike Rutherford) to Genesis's 12-string acoustic passages in songs such as "The Musical Box", "Entangled", "The Cinema Show", and the beginning part of "Supper's Ready". Banks was also an occasional back-up vocalist and sang lead vocal on part of "Shepherd", a song from 1970 which was only released on the Genesis Archive 1967–75 boxed set. Though Genesis's practice was to write songs as a group, Banks would on occasion bring to the group a completed song and not allow the other members to add anything to it, starting with "Time Table" on Foxtrot (1972). Notable Banks-penned Genesis songs include the minor hit "Many Too Many" and the anthemic ballad "Afterglow", which remained a popular coda to the Banks-driven medleys that the group played during live shows for years.

Initially Banks played only piano and backing vocals with Genesis, but by the time of Trespass (1970) he had expanded his keyboards repertoire to include Hammond organ and Mellotron. According to Phillips, Banks had an especially difficult time adapting to the organ, which he called "a box of tricks". Banks said he found both the Hammond organ and Mellotron rather limited once he got a handle on them, and acquiring more advanced synthesizers such as the ARP Pro Soloist (which he first used on the 1973 album Selling England by the Pound) opened up a wide range of possibilities for him.

Original lead singer Peter Gabriel was both Banks's best friend within Genesis and the member he feuded with most frequently. Gabriel recalled, "We were used to having this passive-aggressive tone to rehearsals and, although Tony and I were best friends, we would often be at loggerheads about the music. He was a lot more nervous back then and not at ease within himself.... Without question, we were passionate about creating something great, but I think we were also both awkward buggers, so it was a personality thing as well."

In 1997, Banks turned down an invitation to play on Steve Hackett's solo album Genesis Revisited as he disliked going over past material and an appearance would have added confusion to the fact that Genesis were close to putting out Calling All Stations.

After Genesis split in 1998, Banks's career stagnated, and he considered retirement from music. It was during this time that he began composing, titling an early piece "Black Down" which led to his decision to pursue orchestra composition.

=== 1978–present: Solo projects ===
==== Rock albums ====
Banks first thought of making a solo album in 1975, following Gabriel's departure from Genesis. He had a group of songs in development at the time which were used on A Trick of the Tail (1976), their first album recorded without Gabriel, including "Mad Man Moon" and sections of "Entangled" and "Ripples".

In 1979, after Genesis had entered a break in activity, Banks and Rutherford travelled to Polar Studios in Stockholm and recorded their first studio albums. Banks's album, A Curious Feeling, was released first in October of that year. It was originally meant to be based on and titled after the short story Flowers for Algernon by Daniel Keyes, and Banks had written a complete set of lyrics for the story, but shelved the idea after he was made aware of an upcoming musical about the book. In addition to keyboards Banks played the guitar and bass as he wanted the album to be "As personal as possible". He enlisted Kim Beacon of String Driven Thing as vocalist.

In June 1983, Banks released his second studio album, The Fugitive. It remains his only album to feature him as lead vocalist on all of the songs, a role he considered after recording guide vocals for Phil Collins to sing for "Me and Sarah Jane" and "Keep It Dark" on the Genesis album Abacab (1981). Banks has employed guest vocalists on his solo albums; these have included Fish, Nik Kershaw, Toyah Willcox, Jack Hues and Jim Diamond.

In 1988, Banks recorded a pop and rock-oriented album under the group identity Bankstatement, featuring guitarist and co-producer Steve Hillage and singers Alistair Gordon and Jayney Klimek, plus additional musicians. Banks felt inspired to pursue the project having witnessed Rutherford enjoy the success of his own group, Mike + the Mechanics. Their eponymously titled album was released in 1989. Banks also performed lead vocals on the song "Big Man."

Banks released his fourth studio album, Still, in April 1991 featuring Fish and Nik Kershaw. In contrast to his previous use of one or two vocalists on an album, he chose a greater number for Still as he saw little point in restricting himself and selected different people for tracks they suited best. As on the previous album, Banks took the lead vocal on one track (Hero For an Hour)

Banks formed his second group project outside Genesis in 1994. He initially wanted to name the band Incognito, but found out there was another group with the name and chose Strictly Inc. It featured him with Wang Chung vocalist Jack Hues, and their eponymously titled album saw a UK release in September 1995.

In 2004, after recording his classical album Seven, Banks expressed an interest in recording another rock solo album but decided that the environment was becoming increasingly difficult in terms of securing a deal; yet the likelihood of it solely being an independent or online release did appeal to him. He added: "I'm not trying to prove anything. I haven't got to convince anybody. I don't have to worry about reviews or anything like that. You are just doing it for people who are familiar with what you are doing".

==== Film scores ====
In 1978, Banks and Rutherford were asked by musician and producer Rupert Hine to write music for the horror film The Shout (1978), after David Bowie was originally booked but failed to attend sessions. Hine recommended Genesis, and organised recording in a church without Collins as he was unavailable at short notice. The main theme that they developed was later featured on "From the Undertow" on Banks's solo album A Curious Feeling.

Banks's first major film score was for the 1983 loose remake The Wicked Lady (1983), for director Michael Winner. The soundtrack was released in April 1983 on Atlantic Records.

Around 1983, Banks was asked by director Peter Hyams to score the soundtrack to 2010: The Year We Make Contact (1984), the sequel to the popular science fiction film 2001: A Space Odyssey (1968), having liked his work for The Shout. However, the "masses" of music Banks had written was poorly received by Hyams which led to his departure from the project, leaving Banks disappointed. With months to spare, Banks accepted the job of scoring another science fiction film, Lorca and the Outlaws (1984), which came with no salary. Its low budget prevented Banks from using a professional studio, so he wrote the music using his own 16-track machine.

His next soundtrack was the drama film Quicksilver (1986). Banks recalled the directors were more supportive towards him and the process went smoothly, but disliked their demand for more straightforward songs on the soundtrack in order to have a hit single that they could release. Among the tracks recorded was "Shortcut to Somewhere", a collaboration with Marillion singer Fish, which became the only single from Banks's solo career to chart in the UK when it reached number 75.

Selections of music written for Lorca and the Outlaws and Quicksilver were later released on Banks's compilation album Soundtracks (1986).

==== Classical albums ====
Banks became interested in the music of Gustav Mahler after hearing it in the film Death in Venice (1971). He also cites Dmitri Shostakovich and Erik Satie as composers whose music he has enjoyed. He identifies Symphony No. 4 in A minor and Symphony No. 7 in C major by Jean Sibelius, and Symphony No. 5 in D major by Ralph Vaughan Williams as favourite pieces. Critics have noted that Vaughan Williams and film composer John Barry are notable influences on his own orchestral compositions. Banks has acknowledged similarities in style between his orchestral works and those of Vaughan Williams, Sibelius and Barry.

In March 2004, Banks released his fourth studio album, and first of entirely classical music, entitled Seven: A Suite for Orchestra on Naxos Records. He had the idea for the album around six years prior to starting working on it, and felt encouraged after hearing the orchestral arrangements of his compositions for the soundtrack to The Wicked Lady. It features seven compositions performed by the London Philharmonic Orchestra with Banks on the piano for three tracks with conductor Mike Dixon.

On 26 March 2012, Banks's second classical album was released (also on Naxos), entitled Six Pieces for Orchestra, performed by the City of Prague Philharmonic Orchestra conducted by Paul Englishby. Tracks are: "Siren" featuring Martin Robertson on alto saxophone, "Still Waters", "Blade" with Charlie Siem on violin, "Wild Pilgrimage", "The Oracle" and "City of Gold".

Banks's third classical music album, Five, was released in February 2018. As he related in the album's booklet, "In 2013, I was approached to write a piece for the following year's Cheltenham Music Festival, which I readily agreed to as this seemed a good opportunity for me to have one of my orchestral pieces played live, which had not happened before...since then I have written more music, creating this suite...". It features five pieces performed by The Czech National Symphony Orchestra and Choir conducted by Nick Ingman, and Banks on piano and celeste.

Other recent projects includes writing music for operatic tenor John Potter and to a Shakespeare sonnet.

== Reception ==
Music historian Wayne Studer has referred to Banks as "the most tasteful keyboardist of prog rock." Scott Solida of MusicRadar also described him as "tasteful and often restrained", whose "playing was always in service to the song." Solida added, "Banks exhibited a sense of arrangement and purpose so often missing in the excesses of his peers." In 2018, Philip Wilding of Classic Rock described Banks as "the most overlooked solo artist from Genesis".

Banks has pioneered many unique keyboard and synthesizer sounds throughout his career; one of his achievements was the technique of using the trigger output of a Linn LM-1 drum machine to have the hi-hat pattern trigger an ARP Quadra synthesizer, creating such parts as the pulsating drum sound in "Mama" (from 1983's Genesis) and "By You" on The Fugitive (1983). Another unique synth technique was used on the track "Who Dunnit?" from the 1981 album Abacab; a Sequential Circuits Prophet-5 was programmed with a few sounds, and the patches were switched manually (via the panel preset tabs) while he played.

Known for his lack of flamboyance on stage, Banks did however wear a snorkel for performances of "Who Dunnit?" on the Abacab tour.

== Instruments ==
Banks, who has played the piano for many years, achieved a distinctive sound by running all of his keyboards (as well as his 12-string guitar) into a mixing board and then running the signal output of the board into a Leslie speaker This can clearly be heard on everything Banks plays on the Genesis Live album.

Banks's earliest setup included a Hammond L-100 organ, a Hohner Pianet N and a Mellotron MkII, all of which (as well as grand piano) are first heard on the Trespass album. Banks used the Pianet as both a substitute for a grand piano, and also as a lead instrument, with the use of a fuzz box (also homemade, similar to the Fender Blender). He would often duel with Hackett's guitar, as heard on tracks like "The Musical Box", "The Return of the Giant Hogweed", and "Supper's Ready". Banks in 1974 switched from his Pianet to an RMI 368 Electra Piano and Harpsichord, which was soon integrated into the sound of Genesis, as first heard at various points on The Lamb Lies Down on Broadway (1974) album. It was often effected with the homemade fuzz box and an MXR Phase 100 – later these pedals were inserted in the panel of the Electra Piano. In 1978, the RMI was replaced with the Yamaha CP-70 electric grand piano.

The first synthesizer used by Banks was the monophonic ARP Pro Soloist, which Banks first acquired in 1973 along with a Hammond T-102 and a Mellotron M400 for the Selling England by the Pound album, replacing the Hammond L122 and the Mellotron MkII. With the release of the Trick of the Tail album in 1976 and onward, Banks made use of the ARP 2600, a semi-modular synthesizer, although it was not used live until 1978, when Banks stopped using the Pro Soloist after reaching a dead end with its sonic capabilities. For Wind & Wuthering, he added a Roland RS-202 string and brass synthesizer to mainly replace the Mellotron, though not used live. He also briefly used a Fender Rhodes electric piano. On 1978's ...And Then There Were Three... the Polymoog (one of the first polyphonic synthesizers) was integrated into Banks' expansive array, which enabled more expressive and highly layered "colorful" textures along with his unique use of MXR Phase 100 and Boss CE-1 Chorus effects pedals on the Hammond T-102 organ. He also acquired a Yamaha CP-70 electric grand piano, which, when put through a Boss chorus, would become a signature part of Banks' 1970's - 80's sound.

He used this technique all the way up to Duke in 1980, when he made a major overhaul of his rig, dropping the ARP 2600, the Mellotron and the RS-202 in favour of a Sequential Circuits Prophet-5, an ARP Quadra and a Roland VP-330. He also acquired a Yamaha CS-80, although it was only used in the studio on Duke. On Abacab in 1981, the organ was no longer featured; organ sounds were emulated using a Sequential Circuits Prophet 10 synthesizer through the Boss CE-1. For the album Genesis in 1983, he replaced the Polymoog with an E-mu Emulator digital sampler. He also added a NED Synclavier II, which also has had prominent features in Banks' career, such as on "Home by the Sea". His final changes in this rig were replacing the E-mu Emulator with an E-mu Emulator II+ and the Roland VP-330 with a Yamaha DX7 for Invisible Touch. Since the We Can't Dance (1991) album, Banks has favoured Roland and Korg synthesizers, such as Roland JD-800 and Korg Wavestation.

Evolving technology and sampling has allowed him to use a smaller rig of four or three keyboards with an array of rack mounted synth modules to emulate many of the earlier sounds. His concert rigs since When in Rome 2007 include Korg Wavestation and Roland A-90 keyboard acting as MIDI controllers for rack mounted Korg Wavestation SR, Roland JD-990, Yamaha TX7, E-mu Proteus I and II, and E-mu EIV, as well as Korg OASYS as a master keyboard.

== Personal life ==
Banks married Margaret McBain on 29 July 1972. They had a one-day honeymoon as Banks was too busy with finishing the Genesis album Foxtrot. Banks said: "The band felt sorry for me so they paid for her to come on the next tour". The couple have two children.

== Discography ==
=== Solo albums ===
Studio albums

- A Curious Feeling (1979)
- The Fugitive (1983)
- Bankstatement (1989, credited to Bankstatement)
- Still (1991)
- Strictly Inc. (1995, credited to Strictly Inc.)
- Seven: A Suite for Orchestra (2004)
- Six Pieces for Orchestra (2012)
- Five (2018)

Soundtrack albums

- The Wicked Lady (1983)
- Soundtracks (1986)

Box sets

- A Chord Too Far (2015)
- Banks Vaults: The Albums 1979–1995 (2019)
- 18 Pieces for Orchestra (2024)

=== Singles ===
- "For a While" (1979)
- "For a While" (reissue) (1979)
- "The Wicked Lady" (1983)
- "This Is Love" (1983)
- "And the Wheels Keep Turning" (1983)
- "You Call This Victory" (1985, feat. Jim Diamond)
- "Shortcut to Somewhere" (1986, feat. Fish)
- "Throwback" (1989, Bankstatement)
- "I'll Be Waiting" (1989, Bankstatement)
- "I Wanna Change the Score" (1991, feat. Nik Kershaw)
- "The Gift" (1991, feat. Andy Taylor)
- "Still It Takes Me by Surprise" (1992, feat. Andy Taylor)
- "Only Seventeen" (1995, Strictly Inc.)
- "Walls of Sound" (1995, Strictly Inc.)

== Sources ==
- Bowler, Dave; Dray, Bryan (1992). Genesis – A Biography. Sidgwick & Jackson. ISBN 978-0-283-06132-5.
- Hewitt, Alan (2000). Opening the Musical Box – A Genesis Chronicle. Firefly Publishing. ISBN 978-0-946-71930-3.
- Giammetti, Mario (2006). Tony Banks - Man Of Spells. Edizioni Segno. ISBN 978-88-6138-006-6.
- Romano, Will (2014). Prog Rock FAQ: All That's Left to Know About Rock's Most Progressive Music. Hal Leonard Corporation. ISBN 978-1-617-13620-7.
- Giammetti, Mario (2020). Genesis 1967 to 1975 - The Peter Gabriel Years. Kingmaker. ISBN 978-1-913218-62-1.
- Giammetti, Mario (2026). Tony Banks - Man of Spells - The Magician of Genesis. Kingmaker. ISBN 978-1-9192428-0-4.
