= String Driven Thing =

Scottish band

- Origin: Scotland
- Genres: Folk rock, progressive folk
- Years active: 1967–1975; 1991; 2001–present
- Labels: Concord Records; Charisma Records ozit morpheus Records; Backshop Records
- Members: Pauline Adams; Graham Smith; Robin Adams; Andy Allan; Dick Drake
- Past members: Chris Adams; John Mannion; Colin Wilson; Billy Fairley; Bill Hatje; Colin Fairley; Kim Beacon; Andy Roberts; James Exell; George Tucker; John Bradley; Bob Cairns
- Website: www.stringdriventhing.co.uk

String Driven Thing are a Scottish folk rock band, formed in Glasgow in 1967 and led by married couple Chris and Pauline Adams, with the electric violin of Graham Smith.

== History ==
=== Formation ===
String Driven Thing formed in Glasgow in 1967 as a three-part harmony folk band with the Adamses and guitarist John Mannion. After paying their dues on the Scottish folk circuit they put out an eponymous album on the independent Concord label (copies of which are collectable and difficult to find) although a long way from their later Charisma label output. The group moved to London in 1972 and Chris Adams began to steer the band towards the electric folk-rock genre where his songwriting abilities, which often feature hard-bitten and bitter observations capturing the harsher side of life, would be seen to better effect. By 1972, he had recruited classically trained violinist Graham Smith and Colin Wilson on bass, but soon afterwards guitarist Mannion left, citing musical differences.

=== Record deal and touring ===
Adams then secured a deal with Tony Stratton Smith's Charisma label and another eponymous album came out, produced by Shel Talmy at London's IBC Studios, with the songs "Circus", "Jack Diamond" and "Easy To Be Free" among the standout tracks. With Smith's high octane violin and Pauline Adams' distinctive lispy vocals, the band toured the UK and Europe with Charisma stablemates Lindisfarne and Genesis. This exposure raised their profile and led to TV appearances and an American tour. A second album, The Machine That Cried, was recorded in February 1973 at IBC, but now with the addition of a drummer, Billy "The Kid" Fairley. Standout tracks included "Heartfeeder", "The Machine That Cried" and "Sold Down The River". The song "Night Club", which opened side two, was inspired by the cover of their first Charisma album, designed by Hipgnosis. Recorded while Chris Adams was suffering health problems, including a collapsed lung and depression, the album is on the whole a dark affair. Despite its cult status, it did not sell well at the time.

By 1974, the constant touring was taking its toll and Wilson was replaced by Bill Hatje on bass, then Billy Fairley gave way to Colin Fairley (former Beggars Opera but no relation.) Soon afterwards, disillusioned with life on the road, the Adamses quit and returned to their native Glasgow. With their departure the band disintegrated, but Charisma recruited three musicians to continue touring with Smith and Fairley. Singer Kim Beacon, guitarist Andy Roberts and bassist James Exel joined the band, with Roberts and Exel collaborating for much of the songwriting, including the single "Cruel To Fool" produced by Shel Talmy. Two albums followed. Please Mind Your Head, recorded by engineer Tony Taverner at Escape Studios in Kent, and Keep Yer A'nd On It, produced by Andy Johns at Island's Basing Street studios. Following the release of Keep Yer A'nd On It keyboardist Derek Beauchemin joined the band after violinist Graham Smith left.

String Driven Thing put out a number of singles on the Charisma label, some of which are not on any of the vinyl albums but appear as bonus tracks on Ozit Records CDs. Two of these are the Chris Adams compositions "Eddie" and "It's a Game", which was covered by the Bay City Rollers in 1977 and became a chart hit in the US, Japan and Germany. Chris and Pauline Adams put out a few singles on the Charisma label both as "Chris and Pauline Adams" and just "Adams". The b-side of their first single, "The City at Night", features Graham Smith. The Chris Adams/Graham Smith String Driven Thing line up has reconvened on several occasions, most notably in 1991, 2001 and in 2004 which also saw an appearance from Pauline Adams.

=== Break up ===
The American tour of 1975 highlighted issues which the new line-up had with continuity and finding an appropriate audience. In October that year, they opened for Lou Reed, after which drummer Colin Fairley left the band and Charisma withdrew their support. Fairley went on to have a career as a studio engineer and record producer, for Elvis Costello and The Bluebells among others. Andy Roberts became guitar tech for Jeff Beck and Stevie Winwood, while Jimmy Exell still plays in Denmark. Beacon sang lead on Tony Banks' solo debut, A Curious Feeling, in 1979 and also had solo material issued. He died in 2001.

In 1978, Jimmy Exell played with a number of "session" bands, notably at the Baron's Court Tavern in Baron's Court, London, where he was a regular and a favourite of Alex Sanders' (then known as "The King of the Witches")

Violinist Graham Smith joined Charisma labelmates Van der Graaf in 1977, and also featured on some Peter Hammill albums. He later joined the Iceland Symphony Orchestra, and put out three solo albums in Iceland, later reissued on CD by specialist progressive label Ozit Morpheus Records. Smith guested on the 2021 Spirits Burning album Evolution Ritual.

=== Reformation and second career ===
After 15 years of silence, Chris Adams released a solo album, The Damage, in 1991 and subsequently reformed String Driven Thing for a German tour, the Berlin leg of which was released on Ozit as $uicide, Live in Berlin. Variations of that band toured sporadically throughout the 1990s, but since 2001 the line-up has stabilised, with Andy Allan on bass, Dick Drake on drums and either George Tucker or Chris' son Robin Adams on guitar, with Pauline Adams and Graham Smith occasionally joining them in concert.

In 2007, the band released Moments of Truth, their first studio album in over 30 years, featuring twelve new Adams songs. April 2009 brought the Americana-tinged Songs From Another Country (released for contractual reasons as String Driven) on Backshop Records. The new material was first heard publicly at Fifestock in March 2009 and a new website stringdriventhing.co.uk was launched at the same time as the album release. In 2010, the Adamses gigged with original member John Mannion to celebrate the first album's 40th anniversary. As 2012 was the 40th anniversary of String Driven Thing's signing to Charisma and touring with Genesis, the band did some English gigs with Graham Smith and Pauline Adams.

On 15 June 2013, Robin Adams wrote and released a single with String Driven Thing titled Light The Way. The band regularly performed the song with Robin performing lead vocals in their live set.

Bass player Colin Wilson died in 2013 and founder and lead singer Chris Adams died on 7 October 2016.

== Personnel ==
=== Members ===
Current members

- Pauline Adams - vocals, percussion (1967–1974, 1991, 2001, 2004, 2012–present)
- Graham Smith - violin (1972–1975, 1991, 2001, 2004, 2012–present)
- Robin Adams - guitar (2001–present)
- Andy Allan - bass (2001–present)
- Dick Drake - drums (2004–present)

Former members

- Chris Adams - guitar, vocals (1967–1974, 1991–1994, 2001–2016; died 2016)
- John Mannion - guitar (1967–1972)
- Colin Wilson - bass (1970–1974; died 2013)
- Billy "The Kid" Fairley - drums (1973–1974)
- Bill Hatje - bass (1974)
- Colin Fairley - drums (1974–1975)
- Kim Beacon - vocals (1974–1975; died 2001)
- Andy Roberts - guitar (1974–1975)
- James Exell - bass (1974–1975)
- George Tucker - guitar (1991,1994–2004)
- John Bradley - drums (1991, 1994–2001)
- Bob Cairns - violin (1994–1995)

=== Line-ups ===
1967–1972	1972	1972–1973	1973–1974
Chris Adams – guitar, vocals; Pauline Adams – vocals, percussion; John Mannion – guitar	Chris Adams – guitar, vocals; Pauline Adams – vocals, percussion; John Mannion – guitar; Graham Smith – violin; Colin Wilson – bass	Chris Adams – guitar, vocals; Pauline Adams – vocals, percussion; Graham Smith – violin; Colin Wilson – bass	Chris Adams – guitar, vocals; Pauline Adams – vocals, percussion; Graham Smith – violin; Colin Wilson – bass; Billy "The Kid" Fairley – drums
1974	1974	1974–1975	1975
Chris Adams – guitar, vocals; Pauline Adams – vocals, percussion; Graham Smith – violin; Billy "The Kid" Fairley – drums; Bill Hatje – bass	Chris Adams – guitar, vocals; Pauline Adams – vocals, percussion; Graham Smith – violin; Bill Hatje – bass; Colin Fairley – drums	Graham Smith – violin; Colin Fairley – drums; Kim Beacon – vocals; Andy Roberts – guitar; James Exel – bass	Graham Smith – violin; Kim Beacon – vocals; Andy Roberts – guitar; James Exel – bass
1975–1991	1991	1991–2001	2001
Disbanded	Chris Adams – guitar, vocals; Pauline Adams – vocals, percussion; Graham Smith – violin	Disbanded	Chris Adams – guitar, vocals; Pauline Adams – vocals, percussion; Graham Smith – violin
2001–2004	2004	2004–2012	2012
Disbanded	Chris Adams – guitar, vocals; Pauline Adams – vocals, percussion; Graham Smith – violin		Chris Adams – guitar, vocals; Pauline Adams – vocals, percussion; Graham Smith – violin; Andy Allan – bass; Dick Drake – drums
2012	2012–present
Chris Adams – guitar, vocals; Pauline Adams – vocals, percussion; Graham Smith – violin	Chris Adams – guitar, vocals; Pauline Adams – vocals, percussion; Graham Smith – violin; Robin Adams – guitar; Andy Allan – bass; Dick Drake – drums

== Discography ==
=== Albums ===
- String Driven Thing (Concord CON-S 1001, 1970)
- String Driven Thing (Charisma CAS 1062, 1972)
- The Machine That Cried (Charisma CAS 1070, 1973)
- Please Mind Your Head (Charisma CAS 1097, 1974)
- Keep Yer 'and On It (Charisma CAS 1112, 1975)
- Dischotomy: The Rarities 1971—1974 (Germany, 1992)
- The Early Years 1968—1972 (1993)
- Suicide (Live in Berlin) (Ozit, 1995)
- Studio '72 Plus Live In Switzerland '73 And London '95 (1998)
- The Machine That Cried Band’s Official Version (2006)
- Moments of Truth (2007)
- Songs From Another Country (Backshop, 2009)
- Live on the Foxtrot tour 40th Anniversary (2012)
- Steeple Claydon (Ozit, 26/04/2014)

=== UK Singles ===
- "Another Night in this Old City" / "Say What You Like" (Concord CON 007, 1970)
- "Eddie" / "Hooked on the Road" (Charisma CB.195, 1972)
- "Circus" / "My Real Hero" (Charisma CB.203, 16/02/1972)
- "It's a Game" / "Are You a Rock and Roller" (Charisma CB.215, 1973)
- "I'll Sing One For You / "To See You" (Charisma CB 223, 1974)
- "Mrs O'Reilly" / "Keep on Moving" (Charisma CB 239, 1974)
- "Overdrive" / "Timpani for the Devil" (Charisma CB 247, 1974)
- "Stand Back in Amazement" / "But I Do" (Charisma CB 276, 1975)
- "Cruel to Fool" / "Josephine" (Charisma CB 286, 1976)

=== Demo/promo singles ===
- "Circus" (both sides, Charisma CB.203, demo, 16/02/1972)
- "Are You a Rock and Roller" (both sides, Charisma CB.210, demo, 17/08/1973)

=== Solo releases ===
- Chris & Pauline Adams - "If Only The Good Die Young" b/w "The City At Night" (Charisma CB 244, 1975)
- Adams - "The Crunch" b/w "Hand The Rock On" (Charisma CB 271, 1976)
- Chris Adams - The Damage
- Chris Adams - The Damage II (Ozit)
- Graham Smith - Med Töfraboga (Touch of Magic) (Ozit, 1980)
- Graham Smith - Arrival of Spring (Ozit)
- Graham Smith - Kalinka (Ozit)
