= Soundtracks (Tony Banks album) =

Soundtrack album by Tony Banks
- Released: March 1986
- Recorded: 1984–1986
- Genre: Soundtrack
- Label: Charisma/Virgin; Atlantic (US and Canada)
- Producer: Tony Banks, Richard James Burgess, John Eden

Tony Banks chronology
The Fugitive (1983)	Soundtracks (1986)	Bankstatement (1989)

Soundtracks is a collection of soundtrack pieces from the films Quicksilver (1986) and Lorca and the Outlaws (1984) with music composed by Genesis keyboardist Tony Banks.

== Critical reception ==
Professional ratings
Review scores
Source	Rating
AllMusic	2.5/5 stars

AllMusic's retrospective review rated more of the album's instrumental suites as mixed in quality, but dismissed the three pop songs as mediocre and "rather hookless".

== Track listing ==
Music from the film Quicksilver

All tracks are written by Tony Banks (except noted).

No.	Title	Writer(s)	Featuring	Length
1.	"Short Cut To Somewhere"	Banks, Fish	Fish	3:38
2.	"Smilin' Jack Casey"			3:14
3.	"Quicksilver Suite: Rebirth"			2:57
4.	"Quicksilver Suite: Gypsy"			3:39
5.	"Quicksilver Suite: Final Chase"			2:46

Music from the film Lorca and the Outlaws (a.k.a. Starship)

No.	Title	Writer(s)	Featuring	Length
6.	"You Call This Victory"	Banks, Jim Diamond	Jim Diamond	5:14
7.	"Lion Of Symmetry"	Banks, Toyah Willcox	Toyah Willcox	7:22
8.	"Redwing Suite: Redwing"			5:37
9.	"Redwing Suite: Lorca"			3:48
10.	"Redwing Suite: Kid And Detective Droid"			2:07
11.	"Redwing Suite: Lift Off"			3:06
12.	"Redwing Suite: Death Of Abby"			1:40

== Singles ==
- Lorca and the Outlaws EP (September 1985)
1. "Redwing"
2. "You Call This Victory" By Jim Diamond and Tony Banks
3. "Lion of Symmetry" By Toyah Willcox and Tony Banks
- Shortcut to Somewhere (October 1986)
1. "Shortcut to Somewhere" By Fish and Tony Banks
2. "Smilin' Jack Casey"
3. "K2"

== Quicksilver Original Soundtrack (separate release) ==
1. "Quicksilver Lightning" - Roger Daltrey
2. "Casual Thing" - Fiona
3. "Nothing at All" - Peter Frampton
4. "Shortcut to Somewhere" - Fish and Tony Banks
5. "Love Song from Quicksilver (Through the Night)" - John Parr and Marilyn Martin
6. "One Sunny Day/Dueling Bikes from Quicksilver" - Ray Parker Jr. and Helen Terry
7. "The Motown Song" - Larry John McNally A cover version of this song was done by Rod Stewart in 1991.
8. "Suite Streets - From Quicksilver"
9. "Quicksilver Suite I/Rebirth/The Gypsy" - Tony Banks
10. "Quicksilver Suite II/Crash Landing" - Tony Banks.

== Song notes ==
- A short section of Banks' music heard in the film Quicksilver did not appear on either the soundtrack album or Banks' Soundtracks album.
- Most of the tune to the track "Lorca" was reused in the song "Queen of Darkness" from the Bankstatement album (1989).
- "Smilin’ Jack Casey" is available only on this album. It is not available on the Quicksilver soundtrack album.
- A section of the song "Shortcut to Somewhere" was performed live for the first time when Genesis played a special concert for the 40th anniversary of Atlantic Records in 1988. It is the only Tony Banks solo song to have been played live by the band.

== Musicians ==
- Tony Banks - bass, guitar, keyboards, producer (all except 1)
- Fish - vocals (1)
- Jim Diamond - vocals (6)
- Toyah Willcox - vocals (7)
- The Clinic - design
- John Eden - producer (6 thru 12)
- Richard James Burgess - producer (1)
- Andy Jackson - engineer (1)
- Chas Watkins - engineer (6 thru 12)
