= The Wicked Lady (album) =

Soundtrack album by Tony Banks
- Released: April 1983
- Recorded: 1982–1983
- Studio: St. Peter's Church (Morden); Tony Banks' home
- Genre: Soundtrack
- Label: Atlantic
- Producer: Tony Banks

Tony Banks chronology
| A Curious Feeling (1979) | The Wicked Lady (1983) | The Fugitive (1983) |

The Wicked Lady is the soundtrack to the 1983 remake of the film of the same title. It was composed by Genesis keyboardist Tony Banks. The first side of the LP features Banks performing solo versions of themes from the soundtrack. The second side of the LP is the actual soundtrack performed by the National Philharmonic Orchestra. For many years this had been the only entire solo LP by a Genesis member never to have been released on CD. However, a CD version was released on April 15, 2013.

== Reception ==
Professional ratings
Review scores
| Source | Rating |
|---|---|
| AllMusic | 2.5/5 stars |

In their retrospective review, AllMusic favorably compared the Banks solo half of the album to the instrumentals from A Curious Feeling. They praised the second half for being "more complex and dramatic", but admitted that it would be of little interest to most Genesis fans. They also complimented the format of having the songs rendered in both solo and orchestral versions: "Often switching between minor and major keys within songs, Banks has always shown a proclivity to classical stylings which helps the transitions of his pieces here to their orchestral versions."

== Track listings ==
=== LP ===
Side 1 (performed by Tony Banks)

1. "The Wicked Lady" – 3:34
2. "Spring" – 2:38
3. "The Chase" – 3:30
4. "Caroline" – 3:11
5. "Jerry Jackson" – 2:30
6. "Repentance" – 2:10
7. "Kit" – 3:06
8. "Barbara" – 4:50

Side 2 (performed by the National Philharmonic Orchestra)

1. "Prelude to The Wicked Lady" – 4:05
2. "Portrait of Jerry Jackson" – 4:59
3. "Caroline's Theme" – 3:06
4. "Scherzo" – 2:44
5. "Pastorale" – 4:02
6. "The Wicked Lady" – 3:45
7. "Kit's Theme" – 3:14
8. "Finale" – 2:06

=== CD ===
Music from the film by National Philharmonic Orchestra

1. "The Wicked Lady" – 3:47
2. "Portrait of Jerry Jackson" – 5:01
3. "Caroline's Theme" – 3:06
4. "Scherzo" – 2:44
5. "Pastorale" – 4:02
6. "Prelude to The Wicked Lady" – 4:06
7. "Kit's Theme" – 3:16
8. "Finale" – 2:06

Variations on themes from The Wicked Lady by Tony Banks

9. "Barbara" – 4:53
10. "The Chase – 3:29
11. "Spring" – 2:36
12. "Kit" – 3:04
13. "Repentance" – 2:09
14. "Caroline" – 3:12
15. "Jerry Jackson" – 2:33
16. "The Wicked Lady" (Custom Version) – 3:59

== Musicians ==
- Side one (LP) played by Tony Banks, recorded at home on 8 track. Mixed at The Farm, Surrey, with help from Steven Short and Geoff Callingham.
- Side two (LP) consists of orchestrated versions played by the National Philharmonic Orchestra of London (leader Sidney Sax), recorded at St. Peter's Church, Morden. Musical arrangements and orchestration by Christopher Palmer. Engineer: Tony Faulkner.
