= Shortcut to Somewhere =

Single by Tony Banks and Fish

from the album Soundtracks
- B-side: "Smilin' Jack Casey"
- Released: September 1986 (UK)
- Recorded: 1986
- Genre: Pop
- Length: 3:35 (A-side)
- Label: Virgin Records; Atlantic Records (US & Canada)
- Songwriter(s): Tony Banks, Fish
- Producer(s): Richard James Burgess, engineered by Andy Jackson

Tony Banks singles chronology
"You Call This Victory" (1985)	"Shortcut to Somewhere" (1986)	"Throwback" (1989)

Fish singles chronology
"Shortcut to Somewhere" (1986)	"State of Mind" (1989)

"Shortcut to Somewhere"
Sample of "Shortcut to Somewhere"

"Shortcut to Somewhere" is a song by Genesis keyboard player Tony Banks, released as the second single from his 1986 album Soundtracks, with Fish on vocals. It was Fish's only commercial recording outside Marillion before his departure from the band in late 1988. Fish also wrote the lyrics for this fast, keyboard-based pop song similar to the Genesis material of this period, with a typical 1980s production. The song is part of the soundtrack for the 1986 film Quicksilver. A section of the song was performed live by Genesis as part of a solo career medley at the 1988 Atlantic Records 40th Anniversary concert. It is the only Tony Banks solo song to have been played live by the band.

== Cover art ==
The cover features a photograph of Tony Banks and Fish each wearing a T-shirt of the other's band: Fish has an Abacab T-shirt, while Banks has a black Marillion T-shirt.

== Music video ==
The video for the single is a pastiche of the "Raindrops Keep Fallin' on My Head" sequence from the 1969 film Butch Cassidy and the Sundance Kid. Fish and Banks are on bicycles, dressed as Butch with bowler hats and waistcoats, playing with a young woman and entertaining her with their antics.

The clip is included on the DVD version of Fish's 2002 compilation album Kettle of Fish, but not found on the CD.

== Musicians ==
- Fish: vocals

== Track listings ==
Source: Genesis discography
7" single

1. "Shortcut to Somewhere" (Banks/Dick) – 3:35
2. "Smilin' Jack Casey" (Banks)

12" single
Side 1: "Shortcut to Somewhere" (Banks/Dick)
Side 2: 1. "Smilin' Jack Casey" (Banks)

2. "K2"
