= Seven (Tony Banks album) =

Seven: A Suite for Orchestra

Studio album by Tony Banks
- Released: March 2004
- Recorded: July 3–5, 8–9, 2002
- Studio: AIR Lyndhurst (London); The Farm (Chiddingfold, Surrey)
- Genre: Classical
- Length: 57:38
- Label: Naxos Records (UK)
- Producer: Tony Banks, Nick Davis

Tony Banks chronology
Strictly Inc. (1995)	Seven: A Suite for Orchestra (2004)	Six Pieces for Orchestra (2012)

Seven: A Suite for Orchestra is an album by Genesis keyboardist Tony Banks. The fourth studio album and first classical solo album by Banks, it was released by Naxos Records in 2004. The suite is performed by the London Philharmonic Orchestra and conducted by Mike Dixon. Banks plays piano on "Spring Tide", "The Ram" and "The Spirit of Gravity".

Seven comprises part of the 2024 box set 18 Pieces for Orchestra: 7–6–5 along with his two other classical albums.

== Track listing ==
1. "Spring Tide"
2. "Black Down"
3. "The Gateway"
4. "The Ram"
5. "Earthlight"
6. "Neap Tide"
7. "The Spirit of Gravity"
