= Still (Tony Banks album) =

Studio album by Tony Banks
- Released: 3 June 1991
- Recorded: 1990–1991
- Studios: The Farm (Surrey, UK)
- Genre: Rock
- Label: Virgin
- Producers: Tony Banks, Nick Davis

Tony Banks chronology
Bankstatement (1989)	Still (1991)	Strictly Inc. (1995)

Still is the third solo studio album by the English keyboardist and songwriter Tony Banks, released in 1991 on Virgin Records in the UK and Giant Records in the U.S. The album was originally going to be named after the track Still It Takes Me by Surprise, but was later shortened to Still. Despite a fairly heavy promotional effort by Giant Records, the album failed to sell well.

== Track listing ==
All tracks written by Tony Banks, except where indicated.

1. "Red Day on Blue Street" (Banks, Nik Kershaw) – 5:53
2. "Angel Face" – 5:23
3. "The Gift" – 4:00
4. "Still It Takes Me by Surprise" – 6:32
5. "Hero for an Hour" – 5:01
6. "I Wanna Change the Score" (Banks, Kershaw) – 4:34
7. "Water Out of Wine" – 4:43
8. "Another Murder of a Day" (Banks, Fish) – 9:13
9. "Back to Back" – 4:38
10. "The Final Curtain" – 5:01

== Singles ==
- I Wanna Change the Score (7 May 1991)
1. "I Wanna Change the Score" (with Nik Kershaw)
2. "Hero for the Hour"
3. "Big Man" (by Bankstatement)
4. "The Waters of Lethe"
- The Gift (22 July 1991)
1. "The Gift" (with Andy Taylor)
2. "Back to Back" (with Jayney Klimek)
3. "A House Needs a Roof" (by Bankstatement)
4. "Redwing"
- Still It Takes Me By Surprise (24 February 1992)
1. "Still It Takes Me by Surprise" (edit) (with Andy Taylor)
2. "The Final Curtain" (with Nik Kershaw)
3. "Still It Takes Me by Surprise" (with Andy Taylor)

== Personnel ==
- Tony Banks – keyboards, synth bass (1, 3, 5, 9, 10), drum programming (2, 3, 7), vocals (5)
- Daryl Stuermer – guitars
- Pino Palladino – bass (2, 4, 7, 8, 10)
- James Eller – bass (6)
- Vinnie Colaiuta – drums (1, 5, 8, 9, 10), hi-hat (3), cymbals (3)
- Graham Broad – drums (6)
- Nick Davis – drum programming (7)
- Luís Jardim – percussion (1, 5–8)
- Martin Robertson – saxophone (1, 5)
- Nik Kershaw – vocals (1, 6, 10)
- Fish – vocals (2, 8)
- Andy Taylor – vocals (3, 4)
- Jayney Klimek – vocals (7, 9), backing vocals (2)

== Production ==
- Tony Banks – producer
- Nick Davis – producer, engineer
- Mark Robinson – assistant engineer
- Mark Bowen – technical assistance
- Geoff Callingham – technical assistance
- Carl Studna – photography
- Wherefore Art? – design
