= A Curious Feeling =

Studio album by Tony Banks
- Released: 12 October 1979
- Recorded: Spring–summer 1979
- Studio: Polar Music Studios (Stockholm, Sweden); Maison Rouge (London, UK)
- Genre: Progressive rock
- Length: 52:54
- Label: Charisma; Charisma/Polydor (US/Canada); Caroline (US)
- Producer: Tony Banks, David Hentschel

Tony Banks chronology
A Curious Feeling (1979)	The Wicked Lady (1983)

A Curious Feeling is the debut solo album by the English keyboardist Tony Banks. It was recorded at ABBA's Polar Music Studios during a brief hiatus for Banks' main group Genesis and released in 1979 on Charisma Records. It is one of only two of Banks' solo albums to have entered the UK Albums Chart, reaching 21 and staying on the chart for five weeks. The album began as an adaptation of the 1966 Daniel Keyes novel Flowers for Algernon before Banks decided to modify the story. Its cover was designed by Hothouse and contains Wuluwait - Boatman of the Dead by Australian artist Ainslie Roberts. It was digitally remastered in 2009.

== History ==
The instrumental piece "From the Undertow" was used in the 1978 British film The Shout, for which Banks, with Mike Rutherford, composed the incidental music. No soundtrack of the film has been released. The piece was originally intended to be the intro to "Undertow" from the Genesis album ...And Then There Were Three... (hence the title).

Initially, producer & engineer David Hentschel couldn't attend the sessions at Polar Studios due to catching measles from his daughter at the time, so assistant engineer Dave Bascombe did the recording. As Tony Banks elaborated, "at that stage [Bascombe] was pretty green and I was pretty green, so we put the basic tracks down and the results were pretty good, quite surprisingly." Hentschel eventually recovered in time to oversee the final overdubs and mixing at Maison Rouge Studios in London.

The album was re-released on 19 October 2009, remixed from the original masters by Nick Davis, who also created a 5.1 DTS 96/24 surround mix which is available on the second disc of the deluxe edition.

== Reception ==
Professional ratings
Review scores
Source	Rating
AllMusic	3./5 stars
Classic Rock	7/10 stars
Music Week	4/4 stars
Record Collector	4/5 stars

According to Banks himself, the album "got some extremely scathing reviews, I don't think they were fair" but he conceded "this was post-punk and this was really not the album that people wanted to hear". Classic Rock reviewer Jerry Ewing agrees with Banks, writing that the album is made of "lush pastoral English prog rock that deserved better at the time" and is probably the musician's best solo effort.

AllMusic gave a positive retrospective review, asserting that "Banks manages to capture the wonderment and allure that enveloped Genesis' Peter Gabriel days... yet he filters out the instrumental intricacies, unorthodox time signatures, and complex poetry which enveloped these works to create a milder but equally effective progressive realm." They praised the album for lacking the instrumental pretentiousness that most would have expected, instead focusing on strong progressive rock compositions.

== Track listing ==
All tracks are written by Anthony Banks.

Side one
No.	Title	Length
1.	"From the Undertow"	2:45
2.	"Lucky Me"	4:23
3.	"The Lie"	4:58
4.	"After the Lie"	4:47
5.	"A Curious Feeling"	3:58
6.	"Forever Morning"	5:59

Side two
No.	Title	Length
1.	"You"	6:28
2.	"Somebody Else’s Dream"	7:45
3.	"The Waters of Lethe"	6:27
4.	"For a While"	3:32
5.	"In the Dark"	2:52
Total length:		52:54

== Personnel ==
- Tony Banks – keyboards, guitars, bass, percussion
- Chester Thompson – drums, percussion
- Kim Beacon – vocals

== Production ==
- Tony Banks – producer
- David Hentschel – producer, engineer
- David Bascombe – engineer
- Geoff Banks – equipment
- Andy Mackrill – equipment
- Dale Newman – equipment
- Hothouse – design
- Ainslie Roberts – cover painting

== Charts ==
Chart (1979)	Peak position
Norwegian Albums (VG-lista)	35
UK Albums (OCC)	21
US Billboard 200	171
