= Stefan Knapp =

Polish painter and sculptor (1921–1996)

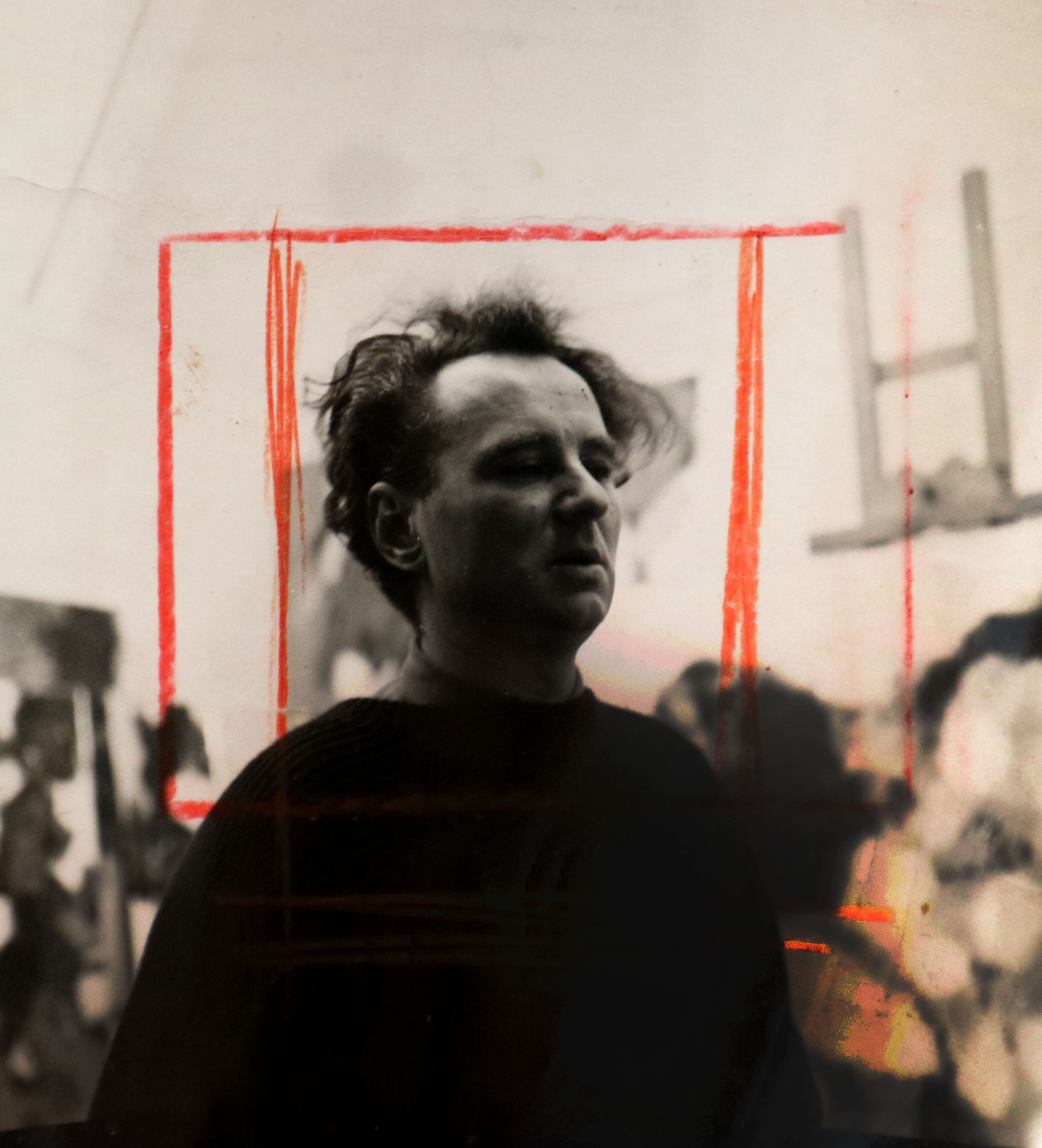
- Stefan Knapp in the studio, 1960
- Born: 11 July 1921; Biłgoraj, Poland
- Died: 12 October 1996 (aged 75); London, England
- Known for: Enamel, painting, sculpture
- Website: stefanknapp.art

Stefan Knapp (11 July 1921 – 12 October 1996) was a Polish painter and sculptor, who worked in Great Britain. He developed and patented a technique of painting with enamel paint on steel, facilitating decorating public architectural structures.

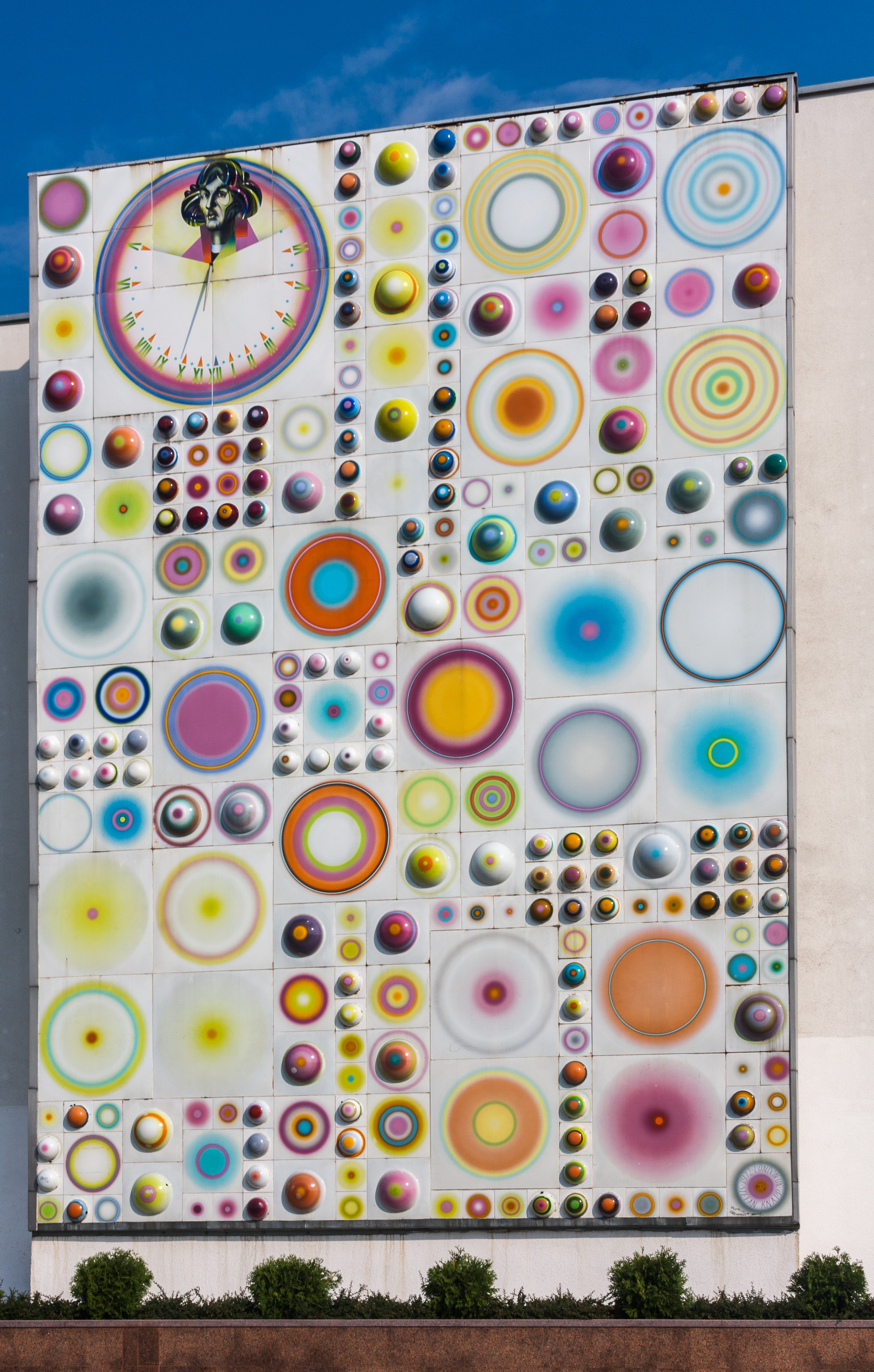
Stefan Knapp mosaic at the Nicolaus Copernicus University in Toruń

== Biography ==
Knapp was born in Biłgoraj. His father's name was Antoni and his mother was Julia, née Wnuk.

In 1935 he began studies at the Lwów Polytechnic. After the outbreak of World War II the Soviet Union occupied Lwów, murdered Knapp's father and sent Stefan to a gulag in Siberia. There, among other things, he worked building schools for Russian children who had been orphaned because their parents had been imprisoned or murdered for political reasons. While in the Gulag, because artistic endeavors were limited, he made chess sets out of bread and playing cards out of trash for his fellow prisoners.

He was released in 1942 after the Sikorski-Mayski Agreement was signed between Poland and Soviet Union. He joined the Anders Army and volunteered for the air force, hence he was shipped to Great Britain. Knapp began his training as a pilot on 29 June 1942 in Hucknall. He served as an officer and Spitfire pilot in the Royal Air Force. While in the RAF Knapp pursued his art by painting or sketching portraits of his fellow pilots in 318 Squadron. After the end of the war he remained in London and took advantage of a veteran's stipend to further his studies at the Royal Academy and at the Slade School of Fine Art.

His experience in the Gulag and as an RAF pilot caused him to suffer from recurring nightmares and insomnia for many years. Consequently, he used his art as a form of therapy. In the late 1940s this resulted in a series of works titled Gulag. The works were noted for many experimental techniques.

Knapp was known for producing murals of unprecedented size with materials which were meant to last for thousands of years. He first received wide attention and acclaim during his exhibition in London in 1954. There he presented a unique and innovative style and technique, which involved melting glass into pieces of light steel, using specially made furnaces. Prior to finding fame he worked as a ski instructor in the Swiss Alps to make ends meet.

In the late 1950s Knapp moved away from traditional painting to experiments with enamel and sculpture. In the 1960s he painted several murals at Heathrow Airport, which were later reinstalled in the 1990s. In the early 1950s he painted a mural in the foyer of Hallfield Primary School, Westminster which was designed by the architect Denys Lasdun. He also painted a mural for the Warsaw metro entitled The Battle of Britain. Between 1954 and 1968 he held at least one exhibition each year, including ones in the Netherlands, Austria, and Peru. In 1972, he proposed an astronomy-themed work for the Nicolaus Copernicus University in Toruń which was accepted. Knapp also designed many decorations for synagogues, many of which he based on his memories of synagogues, kirkuts and Jewish prayer houses in his childhood town of Biłgoraj.

In the 1970s Knapp, together with his wife, moved to the British countryside, where he built a large furnace for his work.

Knapp is also the painter of a mural that was formerly on the now-demolished Alexander's department store in Paramus, New Jersey. The 280-panel mural was sized at 200⨯50 feet (about 60⨯15 metres), and at the time of creation in 1963 was the largest mural in the world. Since the building's demolishment, the mural has been in storage with sections of it occasionally exhibited at the Art Factory in Paterson, New Jersey. In September 2021, the directors of Valley Health System and the mayor of Paramus announced that they would be installing fifty pieces of the mural in various spots along the campus of the new Valley Hospital, which is being built in Paramus and scheduled to open in 2023.

For his military service he was awarded the Virtuti Militari cross. Knapp was the only Pole ever to receive the Churchill Fellowship, which he used to study and expand his knowledge of murals in Guatemala, India, Iran, Japan and Mexico. His other awards included the Knight's Cross of Polonia Restituta and the Cross of Valor. He was one of the best known Polish artists working in Great Britain. He wrote an autobiography "Kwadratowe Słońce" (The Square Sun) about his life in the Siberian gulag.

He died in 1996 at his studio in London, still working on his art. Thousands of people attended his funeral in London.

A retrospective exhibition of some of Knapp's best known works is currently installed at the Mid Wales Arts Centre, Maesmawr, Caersws, Newtown SY17 5SB

== Gallery ==
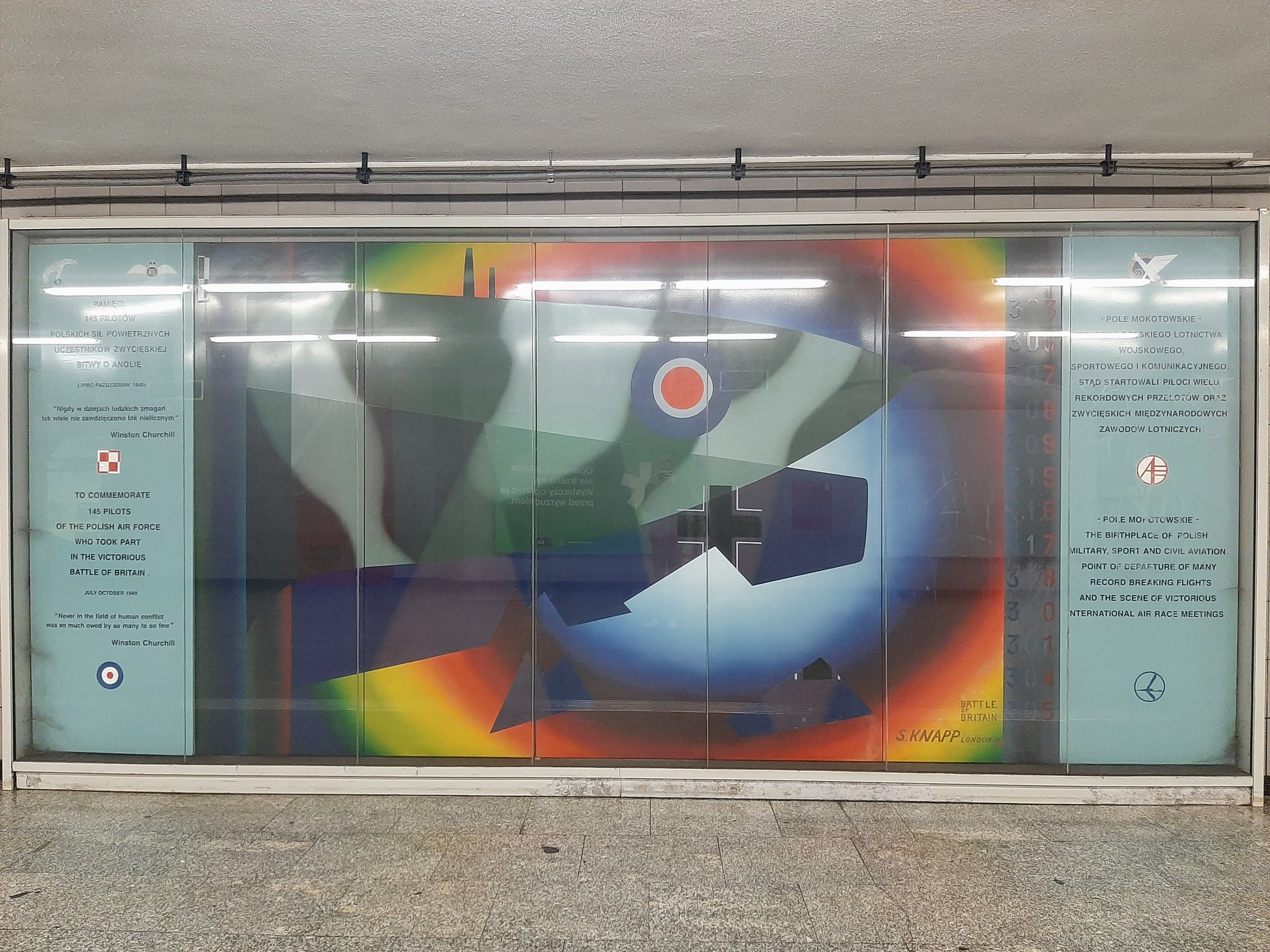
Battle of Britain at Pole Mokotowskie station in Warsaw, 1996

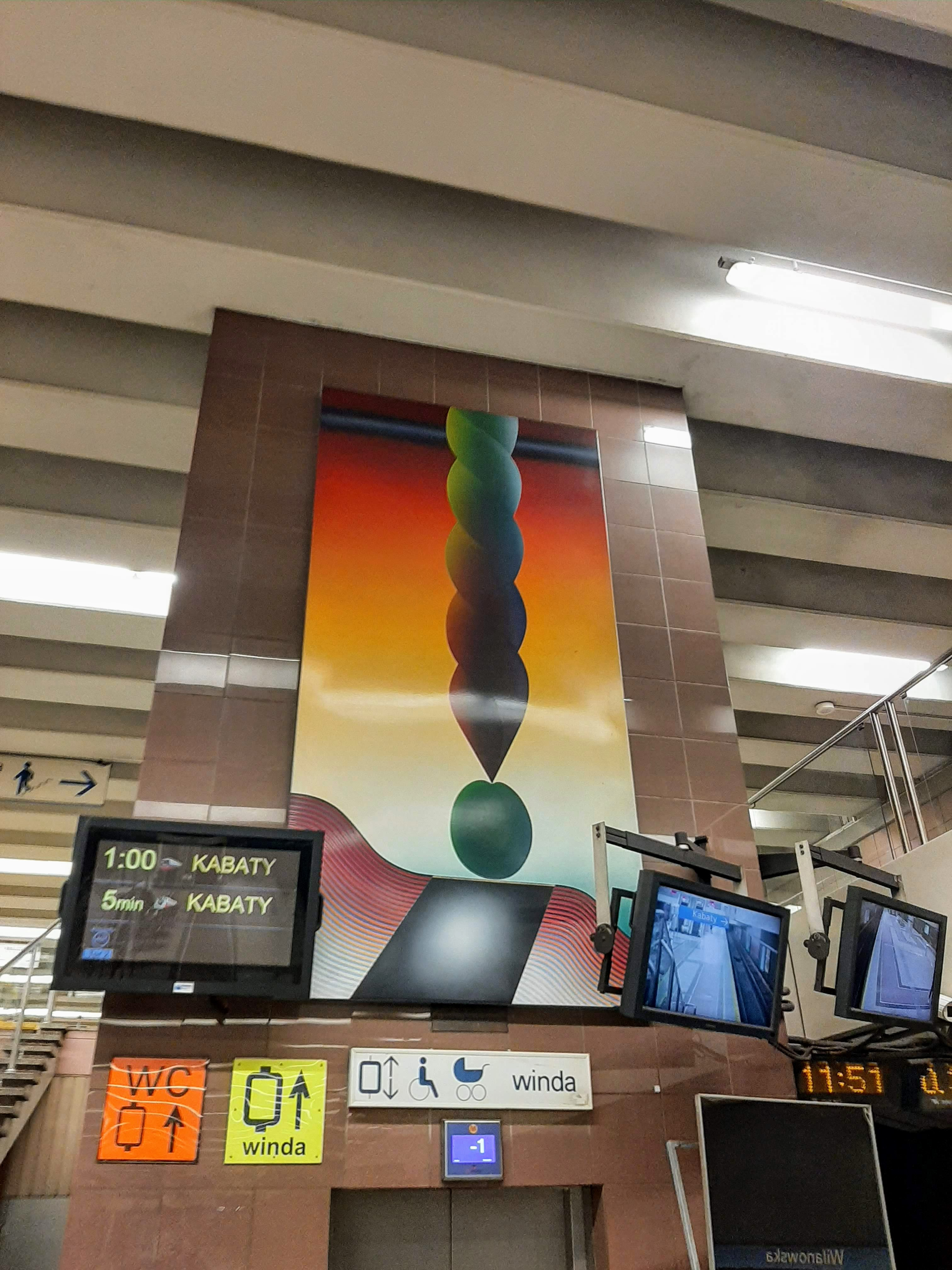
Artwork at Wilanowska station, Warsaw

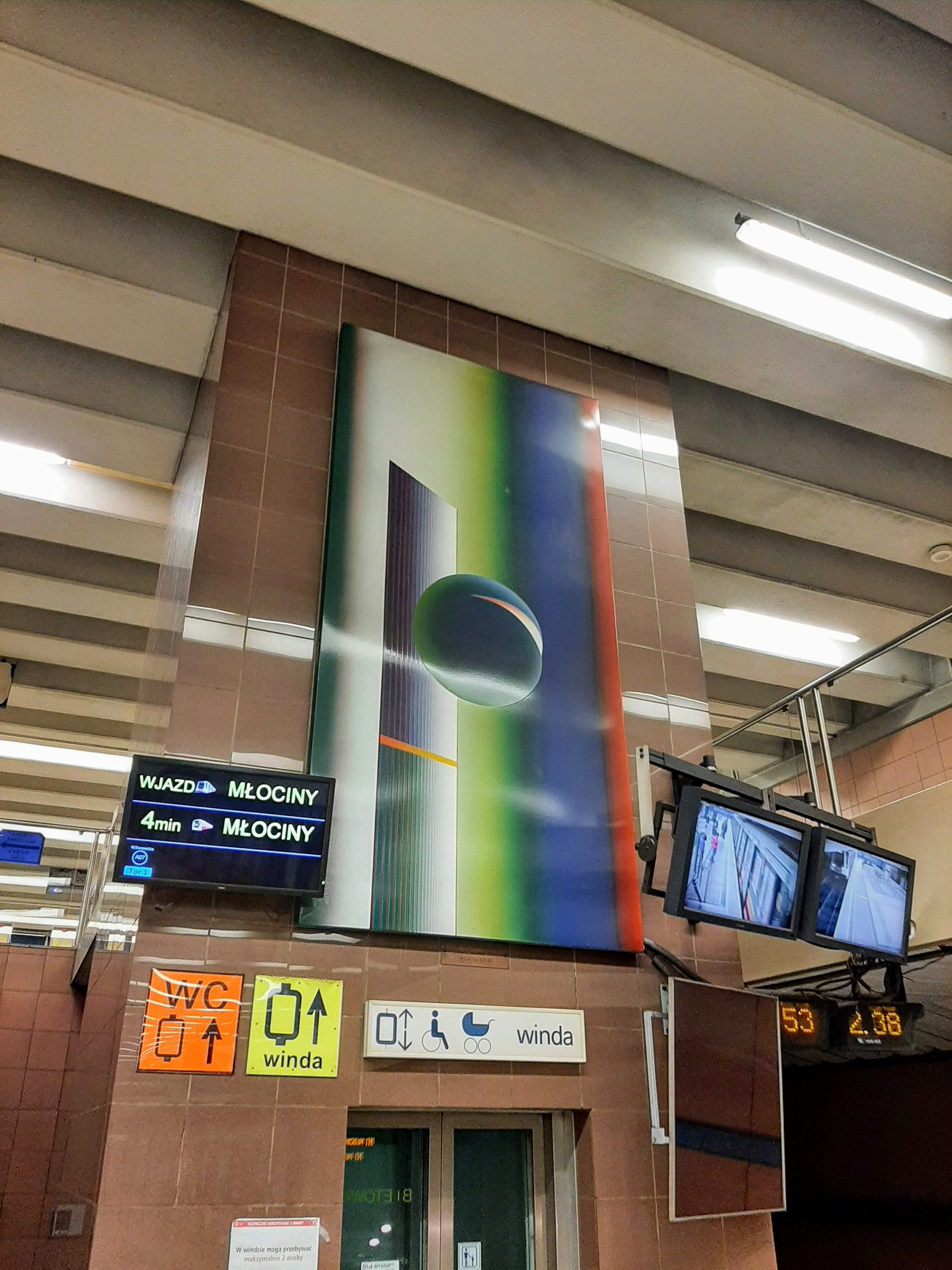
Wilanowska station, Warsaw
