= Bankstatement =

Studio album by Bankstatement
- Released: August 14, 1989
- Recorded: 1988–1989
- Studio: The Farm (Chiddingfold, Surrey, UK)
- Genre: Rock
- Length: 53:35
- Label: Virgin, Atlantic (US/Canada)
- Producer: Tony Banks, Steve Hillage

Bankstatement chronology
Soundtracks (1986)	Bankstatement (1989)	Still (1991)

Singles from Bankstatement
- 1. "Throwback" Released: July 24, 1989; 2. "I'll Be Waiting" Released: October 16, 1989

Bankstatement is a studio album by Genesis keyboardist Tony Banks, issued under a band name and released in 1989. The other band members were singers Alistair Gordon and Jayney Klimek. It was Banks' third studio album (his first issued under a band name and fifth album overall). Steve Hillage, of the band Gong, played guitar and co-produced the album with Banks.

== Critical reception ==
Professional ratings
Review scores
Source	Rating
AllMusic	4/5 stars

In a retrospective review, AllMusic praised the album for achieving well-crafted mainstream pop, and regarded it as a mystery that neither the album itself nor its singles were hits. They especially praised the three lead vocalists, saying they "do an outstanding job blending with fluid, often dark soundscapes."

== Track listing ==
All songs written by Tony Banks.

1. "Throwback" – 4:39
2. "I'll Be Waiting" – 5:56
3. "Queen of Darkness" – 4:26
4. "That Night" – 4:41
5. "Raincloud" – 4:40
6. "The Border" – 5:52
7. "Big Man" – 4:16
8. "A House Needs a Roof" – 4:07
9. "The More I Hide It" – 4:30
10. "Diamonds Aren't So Hard" (omitted from LP version) – 5:12
11. "Thursday the Twelfth" – 4:48

== Personnel ==
Bankstatement

- Tony Banks – keyboards, synth bass, synth lead guitar (7), lead vocals (7)
- Alistair Gordon – lead vocals (1, 2, 4, 5, 6, 9, 10), backing vocals
- Jayney Klimek – lead vocals (3, 4, 8), backing vocals

Additional personnel

- Steve Hillage – guitars
- Pino Palladino – bass guitar (1, 2, 4, 5, 11)
- Dick Nolan – bass guitar (3, 6, 7)
- Geoff Dugmore – drums
- Martin Ditcham – congas (5), tambourine (5)
- "The Phantom Horns" – brass (1)
  - Gary Barnacle – saxophones
  - Peter Thoms – trombone
  - John Thirkell – trumpet
  - Derek Watkins – trumpet
- Martin Robertson – saxophones (9, 10)
- John Wilson – additional vocals (1)

== Production ==
- Tony Banks – producer
- Steve Hillage – producer
- Steve Chase – engineer
- John Gallon – additional engineer
- Paul "Croydon" Cook – additional and assistant engineer
- Andy Mason – additional and assistant engineer
- Hugo Nicholson – additional and assistant engineer
- Simon Osborne – additional and assistant engineer
- Mike Bowen – technical assistant
- Geoff Callingham – technical assistant
- Halpin Grey Vermier – sleeve design
- Andrew Olney – cover photography
- John Swannell – portrait photos
