= Wang Chung discography =

- Studio albums: 7
- Compilation albums: 2
- Singles: 21
- Music videos: 12

The following article documents the album, single and multimedia releases by the English new wave band Wang Chung.

== Albums ==
=== Studio albums ===
Title	Album details	Peak chart positions						Certifications
Title	Album details	UK	AUS	GER	NLD	NZ	US	Certifications
Huang Chung	Released: March 1982; Label: Arista; Formats: Vinyl, cassette, CD (1995 reissue only)^{1}	—	—	—	—	—	—	
Points on the Curve	Released: February 1984; Label: Geffen; Formats: CD, LP, cassette, digital download	34	56	34	19	25	30	
Mosaic	Released: October 1986; Label: Geffen; Formats: CD, LP, cassette	—	94	—	—	—	41	RIAA: Gold
The Warmer Side of Cool	Released: May 1989; Label: Geffen; Formats: CD, LP, cassette	—	—	—	—	—	123	
Tazer Up!	Released: 11 December 2012; Label: Digitally Sound; Formats: Digital download	—	—	—	—	—	—	
Orchesography	Released: 10 May 2019; Label: August Day; Formats: CD, digital download	—	—	—	—	—	—	

=== Soundtrack albums ===
Title	Album details	Peak chart positions
Title	Album details	US
To Live and Die in L.A.	Released: 30 September 1985; Label: Geffen; Formats: CD, LP, cassette, digital download	85

=== Compilation albums ===
Title	Album details
Everybody Wang Chung Tonight: Wang Chung's Greatest Hits	Released: 25 March 1997; Label: Geffen; Formats: CD, LP, cassette, digital download
20th Century Masters – The Millennium Collection: The Best of Wang Chung	Released: 8 October 2002; Label: Geffen; Formats: CD, digital download

== Extended plays ==
Title	EP details
Abducted by the 80's	Released: 2010; Label: Chong Music; Formats: 2CD, download
Dance Hall Days (orchestral version)	Released: 26 March 2019; Label: August Day; Formats: CD, digital download
Everybody Have Fun Tonight (orchestral version)	Released: 10 May 2019; Label: August Day; Formats: CD, digital download

== Singles ==
Year	Title	Peak chart positions										Album
Year	Title	UK	AUS	CAN	GER	NL	NZ	SWE	US	US Dance	US Main	Album
1980	"Isn't It About Time We Were on TV"	—	—	—	—	—	—	—	—	—	—	Non-album singles
1980	"Stand Still"	—	—	—	—	—	—	—	—	—	—	Non-album singles
1981	"Hold Back the Tears"	—	—	—	—	—	—	—	—	—	—	Huang Chung
1982	"Ti Na Na"	—	—	—	—	—	—	—	—	—	—	Huang Chung
1982	"China"	—	—	—	—	—	—	—	—	—		Huang Chung
1982	"Dance Hall Days"	—	—	—	—	—	—	—	—	—	—	Non-album single
1983	"Don't Be My Enemy"	92	—	—	—	—	—	—	86	17	—	Points on the Curve
1984	"Don't Let Go"	81	94	26	40	—	—	—	38	1	—	Points on the Curve
1984	"Dance Hall Days" (re-recorded version)	21	7	9	5	10	6	9	16	1	24	Points on the Curve
1984	"Wait"	87	—	—	—	—	—	—	—	17	—	Points on the Curve
1985	"To Live and Die in L.A."	—	—	—	—	—	—	—	41	—	21	To Live and Die in L.A. (soundtrack)
1985	"Fire in the Twilight"	—	—	—	—	—	—	—	110	—	—	Breakfast Club (soundtrack)
1986	"Everybody Have Fun Tonight"	76	8	1	—	28	23	—	2	4	25	Mosaic
1987	"Let's Go!"	81	14	9	—	—	19	—	9	41	—	Mosaic
1987	"Hypnotize Me"	—	—	46	—	—	—	—	36	—	—	Mosaic
1989	"Praying to a New God"	—	127	59	—	—	—	—	63	—	31	The Warmer Side of Cool
1997	"Space Junk"	—	—	—	—	—	—	—	—	—	—	Everybody Wang Chung Tonight: Wang Chung's Greatest Hits
1997	"Dance Hall Days" (re-issue)	—	—	—	—	—	—	—	107	—	—	Everybody Wang Chung Tonight: Wang Chung's Greatest Hits
2011	"Rent Free"	—	—	—	—	—	—	—	—	—	—	Tazer Up!
2019	"Dance Hall Days" (orchestral version)	—	—	—	—	—	—	—	—	—	—	Orchesography
2019	"Everybody Have Fun Tonight" (orchestral version)	—	—	—	—	—	—	—	—	—	—	Orchesography
"—" denotes a recording that did not chart or was not released in that territory.

== Other appearances ==
Year	Title	Album
2005	"Akasha"	Of Hands and Hearts: Music for the Tsunami Disaster Fund
