= 20th Century Masters – The Millennium Collection: The Best of Wang Chung =

Greatest hits album by Wang Chung
- Released: 8 October 2002
- Recorded: 1983–1997
- Genre: Pop; rock
- Length: 48:01
- Label: Geffen; 069 493 450-2
- Producer: Peter Wolf

Wang Chung chronology
Everybody Wang Chung Tonight: Wang Chung's Greatest Hits (1997)	20th Century Masters – The Millennium Collection: The Best of Wang Chung (2002)	Abducted by the 80's (2010)

Professional ratings
Review scores
Source	Rating
AllMusic	4.5/5 stars

20th Century Masters – The Millennium Collection: The Best of Wang Chung is the second of two compilation albums by the English new wave band Wang Chung. Released in the fall of 2002, this compilation album contains all eight of the band's charted singles from 1984 through 1989. The album also includes "Wait" from Points on the Curve (1983), "What's So Bad About Feeling Good?" from The Warmer Side of Cool (1989), and "Space Junk (Wang Chung '97)" from the previous compilation. "What's So Bad About Feeling Good?" is the only song from the 1982–1989 period to not appear on any chart in the US or the UK, and still make the cut for a Wang Chung compilation album.

== Track listing ==
No.	Title	Length
1.	"Everybody Have Fun Tonight"	4:47
2.	"Dance Hall Days"	3:59
3.	"Don't Let Go"	4:21
4.	"Don't Be My Enemy"	4:22
5.	"Wait"	4:23
6.	"To Live and Die in L.A."	4:53
7.	"Hypnotize Me"	4:40
8.	"Let's Go!"	4:28
9.	"Praying to a New God"	3:57
10.	"What's So Bad About Feeling Good?"	4:11
11.	"Space Junk (Wang Chung '97)"	4:00
Total length:		48:01
