= Everybody Wang Chung Tonight: Wang Chung's Greatest Hits =

Greatest hits album by Wang Chung
- Released: March 25, 1997
- Genre: Pop, rock
- Length: 62:06
- Label: Geffen
- Producer: Jeff Magid

Wang Chung chronology
The Warmer Side of Cool (1989)	Everybody Wang Chung Tonight: Wang Chung's Greatest Hits (1997)	The Best of Wang Chung (2002)

Professional ratings
Review scores
Source	Rating
AllMusic	4.5/5 stars

Everybody Wang Chung Tonight: Wang Chung's Greatest Hits is a compilation album of songs by English new wave band Wang Chung, released in 1997 by Geffen Records. It contains all eight of the band's charted singles from 1984 through 1989. The album also includes three unreleased songs: "Fun Tonight: The Early Years" is a balladic demo of Wang Chung's most popular hit, "Everybody Have Fun Tonight"; "Space Junk (Wang Chung '97)" is a hip-hop-infused track made exclusively for this compilation; and "Dance Hall Days (Flashing Back to Happiness 7-inch Mix)" is a house/techno version of Wang Chung's first hit.

== Track listing ==
No.	Title	Writer(s)	Original release	Length
1.	"Dance Hall Days"	Jack Hues; Nick Feldman; Darren Costin	Points on the Curve, 1984	3:58
2.	"Don't Let Go"	Hues; Feldman	Points on the Curve	4:21
3.	"Don't Be My Enemy"	Hues; Feldman; Darren Costin	Points on the Curve	4:24
4.	"Hypnotize Me"	Hues; Feldman	Mosaic, 1986	4:42
5.	"Let's Go"	Hues; Feldman	Mosaic	4:30
6.	"Praying to a New God"	Hues; Feldman; David Chandler	The Warmer Side of Cool, 1989	3:56
7.	"What's So Bad About Feeling Good?"	Hues; Feldman; Chandler	The Warmer Side of Cool	4:11
8.	"Wait"	Hues	Points on the Curve	4:22
9.	"To Live and Die in L.A."	Hues; Feldman	To Live in Die in L.A. OST, 1985	4:52
10.	"Big World"	Hues	The Warmer Side of Cool	6:12
11.	"Fun Tonight: The Early Years"	Hues; Feldman	"Everybody Have Fun Tonight" single, 1986	4:12
12.	"Everybody Have Fun Tonight"	Hues; Feldman; Peter Wolf	Mosaic	4:47
13.	"Space Junk" (Wang Chung '97)	Hues; Feldman	New track	4:01
14.	"Dance Hall Days" (Flashing Back to Happiness 7-inch Mix)	Hues	New track	3:38
Total length:				62:06

== Personnel ==
Credits adapted from CD liner notes.

- Jeff Magid – compiler, producer
- Chris Hughes – producer (1–3, 8), engineer (1–3)
- Ross Cullum – producer (1–3, 8), engineer (1–3)
- Peter Wolf – producer, arranger (4–7, 10)
- Brian Malouf – engineer, mixing (4, 5, 12)
- Peter Muller – engineer (4, 5, 12)
- Jeremy Smith – mixing (6, 7, 10)
- Tony Swain – producer (9)
- Steve Jolley – producer (9)
- Wang Chung – producers (11, 13)
- Adam Wren – producer (13)
- The Rapino Bros. – producers (14)
- Sal Manna – liner notes
