= Orchesography (album) =

Studio album by Wang Chung
- Released: 31 May 2019
- Genre: Pop, orchestral
- Label: August Day Recordings
- Producer: John Bryan, Sare Havlicek, Wang Chung

Wang Chung chronology
Tazer Up! (2012)	Orchesography (2019)

Singles from Orchesography
- 1. "Dance Hall Days" Released: 26 March 2019; 2. "Everybody Have Fun Tonight" Released: 10 May 2019

Orchesography is the seventh studio album by the English new wave band Wang Chung. It consists of the band's greatest hits re-recorded with the City of Prague Philharmonic Orchestra.

After producing the orchestral albums Orchestral for Visage and Ascension for A Flock of Seagulls, record label August Day decided to continue on the orchestral route by approaching fellow 80s band Wang Chung. Orchesography was released on 31 May 2019 on both CD and digital download formats. On 26 March, a 5-track EP was released for the song "Dance Hall Days" which features the band's re-recording with the orchestra, three remixes from other artists, and one "orcapella" (an orchestral a cappella). A music video was also recorded.

On 10 May, a limited edition box set was released that included four CDs: the main Orchesography album, a vocal and orchestral only CD, a CD containing only the orchestra, and a CD containing non-orchestral remixes of the album tracks. Also included are two CD singles: a 5-track EP of "Dance Hall Days" and an 8-track EP of "Everybody Have Fun Tonight".

== Track listing ==
All tracks are written by Jack Hues and Nick Feldman, except where noted.

No.	Title	Writer(s)	Original release	Length
1.	"Dance Hall Days"	Hues	Points on the Curve, 1984	4:14
2.	"Let's Go"		Mosaic, 1986	5:13
3.	"Everybody Have Fun Tonight"	Hues; Feldman; Peter Wolf	Mosaic	4:30
4.	"To Live and Die in L.A."		To Live and Die in L.A. OST, 1985	5:10
5.	"Overwhelming Feeling"		Tazer Up!, 2012	3:59
6.	"Hypnotize Me"		Mosaic	4:48
7.	"Space Junk"		Everybody Wang Chung Tonight: Wang Chung's Greatest Hits, 1997	4:25
8.	"Electric Days"	Hues; Feldman; Darren Costin	Previously unreleased track	2:20
9.	"The World in Which We Live"		Mosaic	6:48
10.	"Everybody Have Fun Tonight (Reprise)"	Hues; Feldman; Wolf	Mosaic	3:42
Total length:				45:32

== Personnel ==
Musicians

- Jack Hues - lead vocals, guitar
- Nick Feldman - vocals, bass
- Jan Chalupecky - orchestra conductor
- Lucie Svehlova - concert master
- Allan Ryder - saxophone on "Dance Hall Days"
- Baby N'Sola, John Bryan - additional vocals

Technical and additional personnel

- John Bryan, Sare Havlicek, Wang Chung - producers
- Slava Voroshnin - programming
- Sare Havlicek - synth and sampler programming
- Sare Havlicek - mixing
- Adam Wren - additional engineering
- Ray Staff - mastering
- Vitek Kral - orchestra recording engineer
- James Fitzpatrick - orchestra supervisor
- Pete Whitfield, Nick Feldman, Jack Hues, John Bryan, Sare Havlicek - orchestral arrangements
- Christy Lee Rogers - cover art, "Harmony"
- Vinny Vero - Wang Chung logo
