= Romy and Michele's High School Reunion =

1997 American film by David Mirkin

- Theatrical release poster
- Directed by: David Mirkin
- Screenplay by: Robin Schiff
- Based on: Ladies Room by Robin Schiff
- Produced by: Laurence Mark
- Starring: Mira Sorvino; Lisa Kudrow; Janeane Garofalo
- Cinematography: Reynaldo Villalobos
- Edited by: David Finfer
- Music by: Steve Bartek
- Production companies: Touchstone Pictures; Bungalow 78 Productions; Laurence Mark Productions
- Distributed by: Buena Vista Pictures Distribution
- Release date: April 25, 1997
- Running time: 92 minutes
- Country: United States
- Language: English
- Budget: $20 million
- Box office: $29.2 million

Romy and Michele's High School Reunion is a 1997 American comedy film directed by David Mirkin and written by Robin Schiff, based on characters from her play Ladies Room. The film stars Mira Sorvino and Lisa Kudrow as two girls who have not achieved much success in life, and decide to invent fake careers to impress former classmates at their ten-year high-school reunion.

Upon its theatrical release on April 25, 1997, Romy and Michele received mixed to favorable reviews from critics, and grossed $29.2 million on a $20 million budget. Over the years, it has since come to be considered a cult classic.

It was followed by a made-for-TV prequel, Romy and Michele: In the Beginning, in 2005. A direct sequel titled, Romy and Michele 2 starring Sorvino and Kudrow is scheduled for release on Hulu in 2027.

== Plot ==
As high school students in Tucson, Arizona in 1987, Romy White and Michele Weinberger are continually bullied by the "A-Group," a small group of popular, yet mean, girls, led by cheerleader Christie Masters, who humiliates them repeatedly. Romy also has a crush on Christie's boyfriend, athlete Billy Christianson. Their classmate Heather Mooney is in love with a geek named Sandy Frink, but Sandy has a crush on Michele. Finally, at the prom, Romy asks Billy to dance with her. He agrees, but he and Christie trick the girls into thinking he has dumped Christie to be with Romy. Romy waits all night to dance with him, but he has already left with Christie. Michele dances with Romy instead.

Ten years later, Romy and Michele live together in an apartment in Los Angeles, California. Romy works as a cashier in the service department at a Jaguar dealership and Michele is unemployed. They are single, unambitious, and enjoy a casual lifestyle consisting mostly of dancing at nightclubs, eating junk food, and making fun of movies together. At work one day, Romy encounters Heather, who is now a successful businesswoman. Heather informs her about their upcoming ten-year high school reunion.

Romy realizes that their lack of achievements will not make a good impression at the reunion. Failing at their last-ditch attempts to improve themselves, they decide to fake success by showing up in an expensive car and business suits. Romy borrows a Jaguar from a co-worker, and Michele makes their outfits. En route to the reunion, they decide to claim that they invented the Post-it note, believing that no one will know better. A confrontation over the details of their lie escalates into a fight about their friendship, and they decide to part ways once they reach the reunion.

When they arrive at the reunion, Romy leaves Michele asleep in the car, and Michele dreams that she and Romy each separately claim to reunion attendees to have invented Post-its without the help of the other. She begins a romance with Sandy, who is now wealthy and attractive, and Romy gets together with Billy. The two refuse to speak to each other for decades until Romy is on her deathbed; Michele calls her to make amends, but they rehash old confrontations and the dream ends with Romy's death.

Michele wakes up and enters the real reunion. The A-group are all pregnant, and Christie is married to Billy and has two children already. Romy starts to tell the Post-it story, but Heather arrives and unintentionally reveals the lie by telling everyone the real inventor's name. Christie and her friends taunt Romy, who runs out of the room. Michele comforts her and the pair reconcile, deciding to be themselves instead of trying to impress others. They change into brightly colored homemade outfits and return to the reunion.

Christie makes fun of their clothes, but Lisa Luder, a former A-group girl who is now a fashion editor for Vogue, approves of the outfits; Lisa coolly dismisses Christie's objections and the rest of the A-group girls abandon her.

Sandy, now wealthy and successful, arrives via helicopter. He confesses that he still loves Michele and asks her to dance with him. Michele agrees, as long as Romy can dance with them. Their dance receives huge applause, and Sandy escorts them to his helicopter. On their way out, they encounter Billy, who is unhappy in his marriage to Christie and boorishly hits on Romy. As turnabout for the trick he and Christie played on her at their prom, she convinces him to return to his hotel room to wait for her, but instead leaves the reunion with Michele and Sandy in the latter's helicopter.

Six months later, back in Los Angeles, Romy and Michele have opened a successful fashion boutique with their homemade designs using money borrowed from Sandy.

== Cast ==
- Mira Sorvino as Romy White, a cashier in the service department of a car dealership. In high school, Romy was unpopular and bullied frequently. She has been best friends with Michele since high school.
- Lisa Kudrow as Michele Weinberger, a ditzy girl who is unemployed. In high school, Michele was unpopular and bullied frequently, and made fun of because of her scoliosis brace.
- Janeane Garofalo as Heather Mooney, a businesswoman who invented the paper in a special type of cigarette. In high school, Heather was troubled and insecure. She frequently skipped classes and hid behind the school building to smoke. She also had a crush on Sandy Frink.
- Alan Cumming as Sandy Frink, a wealthy, successful businessman who invented a special kind of rubber. In high school, he was an unpopular geek who had an unrequited crush on Michele.
- Julia Campbell as Christie Masters, a housewife who is married to Billy Christianson and has two children, and is pregnant with a third child. In high school, she was a popular cheerleader and leader of the A-group (the most popular clique in school) where she bullied Romy and Michele. In high school, Christie dreamed of becoming a TV anchor woman.
- Vincent Ventresca as Billy Christianson, a heavy-drinking drywaller who works for his father-in-law. He is married to Christie Masters and has two children though their marriage is strained and he is unsure if Christie's latest pregnancy is because of him. In high school, he was a popular and handsome athlete who Romy had a crush on.
- Camryn Manheim as Toby Walters, an optimistic woman who organises the school reunion. In high school, she was part of the yearbook committee and was bullied by Heather Mooney.
- Mia Cottet as Cheryl Quick, a member of the A-group who is pregnant.
- Elaine Hendrix as Lisa Luder, an assistant fashion editor for Vogue. In high school, Lisa was a member of the A-group.
- Kristin Bauer as Kelly Possenger, a member of the A-group who is pregnant.
- Jacob Vargas as Ramon, a co-worker of Romy's. He is attracted to Romy.
- Justin Theroux as Clarence the Cowboy, an outcast who smoked near Heather in high school.
- Tate Taylor as Casey Deegan
- Rick Pasqualone as Mark Black
- Pat Crawford Brown as Truck Stop Waitress

== Production ==
=== Development ===
The Romy and Michele characters first appeared in the 1988 stage play Ladies Room, which was written by Robin Schiff. Schiff was in the comedy troupe The Groundlings with Lisa Kudrow, who starred in the play as Michele opposite Christie Mellor as Romy. Schiff said her inspirations for the characters of Romy and Michele "were loosely based, just visually, on these girls I used to see going into a club on Sunset Blvd. You'd see these two friends, and they looked like they got dressed together and were wearing different versions of the same thing."

Ladies Room was then adapted into a pilot for a sitcom called Just Temporary, with Kudrow and Mellor reprising their roles, but the pilot was not picked up to series. Around this time, film executives at the Disney subsidiary Touchstone came across Schiff's play while "looking for a 'female version of Wayne's World'". Schiff was initially reluctant to adapt the play into a film, thinking some scenes would not transfer well to a movie. After Schiff pondered what it might be like if Romy and Michele were invited to their high school reunion ("…And it wasn't until they fill out the questionnaire when they realize their lives hadn't amounted to anything. That seemed funny to me"), Schiff began work on the script, which she would spend the next five years developing. Schiff based the characters' friendship partly on her relationship with her best friend. "One day we were stuck on a plane on a tarmac, and started reading the Sky Mall catalog and laughing our asses off. That was the kind of friend you want to hang out with—that even stuck on a plane on the tarmac you can still have fun."

=== Casting ===
Kudrow's rising stardom from the show Friends played a part in the film successfully getting through the development stage. Australian actress Toni Collette was a strong contender for the role of Romy and met with director David Mirkin. The studio offered the role to Mira Sorvino, who at that point was about to win a Best Supporting Actress Oscar for the film Mighty Aphrodite. Said Mirkin, "It was definitely a long shot, but I heard she wanted to meet so we had lunch, and I instantly knew that she could do it. Romy and Michele were conceived as one tall and one short, but I loved the idea of Lisa and Mira playing this idiot blonde power couple."

=== Filming ===
Filming took place between April and June 1996 in Los Angeles. Exterior shots of Romy and Michele's fictional Sagebrush High School were filmed at Valencia High School in Santa Clarita. $240,000 of the film's $20 million budget was spent on securing the licensing rights for the song "Time After Time" by Cyndi Lauper. Mona May, who served as the costume designer for Clueless, provided the film's outfits. The film includes product placement for the fictional brands Big Kahuna Burger and Red Apple cigarettes, which originated in Quentin Tarantino's films.

Touchstone initially found David Mirkin's final cut of the film to be too quirky and wanted to sweeten the tone, but Mirkin insisted on keeping the edgier tone.

== Release ==
In the United States, it was released in April 1997, the same month as Grosse Pointe Blank, another 1980s-themed high school reunion film that Disney was involved with.

In Australia, Romy and Michele's High School Reunion opened in June 1997, while in the United Kingdom it opened in August 1997.

=== Box office ===
The film opened at number two in the North American box office, making $7.4 million in its opening weekend, finishing behind Volcano. It grossed a total of $29 million in North America.

=== Critical response ===
On the review aggregator website Rotten Tomatoes, 76% of 66 critics' reviews are positive. The website's consensus reads: "Romy and Michele's High School Reunion has an admittedly slight premise, but it's elevated by ample heart, an infectiously playful spirit, and the buoyant chemistry of Lisa Kudrow and Mira Sorvino." On Metacritic, the film has a weighted average score of 60 out of 100, based on 18 critics, indicating "mixed or average reviews". Audiences polled by CinemaScore gave the film an average grade of "C" on an A+ to F scale.

Roger Ebert gave the film three out of four stars, declaring it was "one of the brightest and goofiest comedies in a while, a film that has a share of truth, but isn't afraid to cut loose with the weirdest choreography I have seen outside a 1960s revival."

Janet Maslin of The New York Times wrote the "candy-colored Romy and Michele's High School Reunion [is] cheerful, giddy fun" and praised the two female leads, saying "Ms. Kudrow and Ms. Sorvino make a fine team, elevating bubble-headedness to new levels of comic ingenuity." Jack Mathews of the Los Angeles Times said "beneath the endless silliness of the movie beats a real heart, and its theme of loyal friendship keeps propping it up every time the thin walls of the story seem about to collapse." Mathews also praised "the dead-pan performances of Sorvino and Kudrow...Romy and Michele are cartoon characters, but the actresses make them both real and enormously sympathetic."

== Accolades ==
Year	Ceremony	Category	Recipients	Result	Ref.
1998	MTV Movie Awards	MTV Movie Award for Best Dance Sequence	Mira Sorvino; Lisa Kudrow; Alan Cumming	Nominated	
1998	Satellite Awards	Satellite Award for Best Actress in a Motion Picture	Lisa Kudrow	Nominated	

== Home media ==
Romy and Michele's High School Reunion was released on VHS by Touchstone Home Video on November 4, 1997. It received a U.S. LaserDisc release on November 26, 1997, with a subtitled Japanese LaserDisc being released on June 25, 1998. The film was then released on DVD on August 24, 1999. It was also reissued as a special edition Blu-ray for the film's 15th anniversary in 2012.

== Legacy ==
Though a modest success at the box office, the film steadily gained a cult following through home video and repeat cable TV airings since release.

In 2005, Romy and Michele: In the Beginning, a prequel television film written and directed by Schiff, premiered on ABC Family. Katherine Heigl plays Romy and Alexandra Breckenridge stars as Michele.

In 2022, Kudrow and Sorvino appeared as their characters to present the award for the 2022 Screen Actors Guild Award for Best Ensemble - Comedy Series.

=== Musical ===
A musical adaptation premiered at the 5th Avenue Theatre in Seattle, Washington in June 2017. The musical, directed by Kristin Hanggi (Broadway's Rock of Ages) stars Cortney Wolfson and Stephanie Renee as Romy and Michele, respectively. Orange Is the New Black and Weeds composers Gwendolyn Sanford and Brandon Jay wrote the music and lyrics to original songs, including "Business Woman Special", "10 Years", "I Invented Post-Its" and "Changing Lives One Outfit at a Time".

In July 2025, it was announced that a new production of the stage musical would premiere off-Broadway on October 14, with a book by Schiff, Sanford, Jay, and direction by Hanggi. Laura Bell Bundy was cast as Romy White and Kara Lindsay was cast as Michele Weinberger.

=== Sequel ===
In 2024, Sorvino said she and Kudrow were finalizing deals for a sequel, with writer Schiff returning.

In January 2025, The Hollywood Reporter said Sorvino and Kudrow were in final talks to return, with filming expected to begin in mid-2025 with Tim Federle directing. In May 2025, Alan Cumming said he would reprise his role as Sandy Frink in the sequel, which was aiming to release in 2027. It will be released by 20th Century Studios (formerly 20th Century Fox), which is now Disney's main adult-focused label following the closures of Touchstone Pictures in 2016 and Hollywood Pictures in 2001 and 2007 and the sale of Miramax Films in 2010. 20th Century Fox was the studio where the film's director David Mirkin had produced his more well-known project The Simpsons, with the original film itself including a clip of this show on a television.

In early 2026, Kudrow told Vanity Fair, "Where ... [the sequel] is, is — my fingers are crossed that they want to do [it], because I read a script that's hilarious ... and I know everyone wants to do it." Additionally, in February, Alan Cumming revealed on The Jennifer Hudson Show that the sequel was set to start filming in the summer. Filming began on June 8, 2026.

== Soundtrack ==
Romy and Michele's High school Reunion: "Original Soundtrack" / "More Music from the Motion Picture"

Soundtrack album by Various artists
- Released: April 15, 1997 (album 1); August 19, 1997 (album 2); November 18, 1997 (Double Features re-release)
- Genres: Alternative pop/rock, alternative indie rock, club/dance, contemporary pop/rock, dance-pop, new wave, punk, synth pop
- Length: 39:14 (album 1); 47:08 (album 2); 78:39 (Double Features re-release)
- Label: Hollywood Records

Professional ratings
Review scores
Source	Rating
Allmusic (first album)	4/5 stars
Allmusic (second album)	3/5 stars
Discogs (first album)	4.3/5 stars
Discogs (second album)	4/5 stars

Two soundtrack albums featuring music from Romy and Michele's High School Reunion were released in 1997 by the Disney-owned Hollywood Records. The first album, titled "Original Soundtrack", was made available ten days before the official North American film release, while the second album, "More Music From the Motion Picture", was released four months later. Due to copyright issues, several songs which featured in the film did not appear on either soundtrack album; songs omitted include the film's opening song "Just a Girl" by No Doubt, "Y.M.C.A." by Village People, "Addicted to Love" by Robert Palmer, "Time After Time" by Cyndi Lauper, "Ain't No Love (Ain't No Use)" by Sub Sub, featuring Melanie Williams, "Footloose" by Kenny Loggins, "Hello Trouble" by The Desert Rose Band, "Don't Get Me Wrong" by The Pretenders and "Have a Good Time" by Talawah Crew. Both albums were reissued as a 2-CD set as part of the Double Features series.

Original Soundtrack

No.	Title	Writer(s)	Performer(s)	Length
1.	"Our Lips Are Sealed"	Terry Hall, Jane Wiedlin	The Go-Go's	2:45
2.	"Venus"	Robbie van Leeuwen	Bananarama	3:39
3.	"(There's) Always Something There to Remind Me"	Burt Bacharach, Hal David	Naked Eyes	3:41
4.	"Dance Hall Days"	Darren Costin, Nick Feldman, Jack Hues	Wang Chung	3:58
5.	"Turning Japanese"	David Fenton	The Vapors	3:44
6.	"Blood and Roses"	Pat DiNizio	The Smithereens	3:36
7.	"Karma Chameleon"	George O'Dowd, Jon Moss, Mikey Craig, Roy Hay, Phil Pickett	Culture Club	4:12
8.	"I Want Candy"	Bert Berns, Bob Feldman, Jerry Goldstein, Richard Gottehrer	Bow Wow Wow	2:46
9.	"Everybody Wants to Rule the World"	Roland Orzabal, Ian Stanley, Chris Hughes	Tears for Fears	4:12
10.	"Heaven Is a Place on Earth"	Rick Nowels, Ellen Shipley	Belinda Carlisle	4:11
11.	"We Got the Beat"	Charlotte Caffey	The Go-Go's	2:30

More Music from the Motion Picture

No.	Title	Writer(s)	Performer(s)	Length
1.	"Everybody Have Fun Tonight"	Nick Feldman, Jack Hues, Peter Wolf	Wang Chung	4:44
2.	"Bad Case of Loving You (Doctor, Doctor)"	Moon Martin	Robert Palmer	3:11
3.	"Whip It"	Gerald Casale, Mark Mothersbaugh	Devo	2:38
4.	"Stayin' Alive"	Barry Gibb, Robin Gibb, Maurice Gibb, Dale Longworth, Kevin O'Toole, Ricardo Lythe	N-Trance	4:02
5.	"She Blinded Me with Science"	Thomas Dolby, Jo Kerr	Thomas Dolby	5:08
6.	"Cruel Summer"	Sara Dallin, Siobhan Fahey, Steve Jolley, Tony Swain, Keren Woodward	Bananarama	3:29
7.	"No One Is to Blame"	Howard Jones	Howard Jones	4:11
8.	"Steppin' Out"	Joe Jackson	Joe Jackson	4:19
9.	"You Keep Me Hangin' On"	Holland-Dozier-Holland	Kim Wilde	4:15
10.	"I Think We're Alone Now"	Ritchie Cordell	Tiffany Darwish	3:47
11.	"Be My Lover"	Melanie Thornton, Uli Brenner, Gerd Amir Saraf, Lane McCray	La Bouche	4:00
12.	"Together Forever"	Stock Aitken Waterman	Rick Astley	3:24

== See also ==
- List of cult films
