= Betrayal (disambiguation) =

Betrayal is violation of trust.

Betrayal or Betrayer may also refer to:

== Films ==
- Betrayal (1929 film), American drama film
- Betrayal (1932 film), British crime film
- Betrayal (1974 film), an ABC Movie of the Week starring Amanda Blake and Tisha Sterling
- Betrayal (1978 film), an NBC telemovie starring Lesley Ann Warren and Rip Torn
- Betrayal (1981 film), Norwegian film by Haakon Gundersen
- Betrayal (1983 film), adaptation of Pinter's play directed by David Jones
- Betrayal (1993 film), Romanian film
- Betrayal (2003 film), by Jeffrey Goldenberg and Courtney Joyner
- Betrayal (2009 film), Norwegian film
- Betrayal (2012 film), Russian film
- The Betrayal (1948 film), American race film
- The Betrayal (1957 film), British film
- The Betrayal – Nerakhoon, by Ellen Kuras and Thavisouk Phrasavath
- Betrayal (2023 film), British film directed by Rodger Griffiths

== Games ==
- Betrayer (video game)
- Betrayal at House on the Hill, a board game by Avalon Hill
- God of War: Betrayal, a 2007 mobile game
- "The Betrayer", the nickname of the Warcraft character Illidan Stormrage
- WWF Betrayal, a 2001 World Wrestling Entertainment video game for the Game Boy Color

== Literature ==
- Betrayal: The Final Act of the Trump Show, by Jonathan Karl (2021)
- Betrayal (Gertz book), full title: Betrayal: How the Clinton Administration Undermined American Security, by Bill Gertz
- Betrayal (Star Wars novel), a 2006 novel by Aaron Allston
- Betrayal (McIntosh novel), the first fantasy novel in the Trinity series published in 2001
- Betrayal (Tilton novel), a 1994 Star Trek: Deep Space Nine novel written by Lois Tilton
- Betrayal (Steel novel), a 2012 novel by Danielle Steel
- Betrayal, in the Dragonlance realm, by Jean Rabe
- Betrayal, a 2021 novel by Omar Shahid Hamid
- Traitors to All or Betrayal, a 1966 novel by Giorgio Scerbanenco
- Betrayal (Fitzpatrick book), a 2012 book by Robert Fitzpatrick
- Betrayer (novel), a 2011 novel set in C. J. Cherryh's Foreigner universe
- Betrayal (Bower book), a 2026 book by Tom Bower
- The Betrayal (Dunmore novel), a 2010 novel by Helen Dunmore
- The Betrayal (Hartley novel), a 1966 novel by L. P. Hartley
- The Betrayal, a 1964 novel by Henry Kreisel
- Tron: Betrayal, a 2020 comic book miniseries

== Music ==
- Betrayal, a 1993 album by Muslimgauze
- "Betrayal", a 1980 song by Jah Wobble from The Legend Lives On... Jah Wobble in "Betrayal"
- "Betrayal", a 1983 song by Secession
- "Betrayal", a 1986 song by Wang Chung on their Mosaic
- "Betrayal", a 2021 song by Trippie Redd and Drake from Trip at Knight
- "Betrayal", a 2026 song by Madonna from Confessions II
- "The Betrayal (Act III)" and "The Betrayal (Act I)", songs by Nickelback from the album Feed the Machine, 2017

== Television ==
- Betrayal (American TV series), a 2013 drama series
- Betrayal (British TV series), a 2026 ITV television drama series
- The Betrayal (Thai TV series), a 2022 drama series

=== Episodes ===
- "Betrayal" (Arrow)
- "Betrayal" (Band of Gold)
- "Betrayal" (Batman Beyond)
- "Betrayal" (Charlie Jade)
- "Betrayal" (Devious Maids)
- "Betrayal" (The Following)
- "Betrayal" (Lincoln Heights)
- "Betrayal" (Revenge)
- "Betrayal" (Spider-Noir)
- "The Betrayal", an episode of Seinfeld

== Other uses ==
- Betrayal (play), a 1978 work by Harold Pinter
- Western betrayal, the Western powers seeming abandonment of Central European nations to Hitler and Stalin from 1931 to 1945

== See also ==
- Betrayed (disambiguation)
- The Great Betrayal (disambiguation)
- Traición (disambiguation)
