= Huang Chung =

Huang Chung may refer to:

- Wang Chung (band), British New Wave musical group
- Huang Chung (album), album of the band Huang Chung
- Huang Chong, or Huang Ch'ung in Wade–Giles, Chinese officer of the Three Kingdoms period
- Huang Zhong (died 220), or Huang Chung in Wade–Giles, leading military general of the Kingdom of Shu
