= To Live and Die in L.A. =

To Live and Die in L.A. may refer to:

- To Live and Die in L.A. (film), a 1985 crime movie directed by William Friedkin
  - To Live and Die in L.A. (soundtrack), the soundtrack to the movie by Wang Chung
    - "To Live and Die in L.A." (Wang Chung song), a 1985 single from the soundtrack
- "To Live & Die in L.A." (song), a 1996 single by Makaveli, the stage name of rapper Tupac Shakur
- To Live and Die in L.A. (novel), a 1984 novel by former Secret Service agent Gerald Petievich; the basis of the movie
- To Live and Die in L.A. (podcast), an investigative and true crime podcast
