= Wait (Wang Chung song) =

Single by Wang Chung

from the album Points on the Curve and To Live and Die in L.A.
- B-side: "Dance Hall Days"
- Released: June 1984
- Recorded: 1983
- Studio: Abbey Road (London)
- Genre: Pop rock; new wave
- Length: 4:22
- Label: Geffen
- Songwriters: Nick Feldman; Jack Hues
- Producers: Chris Hughes; Ross Cullum

Wang Chung singles chronology
"Don't Be My Enemy" (1984)	"Wait" (1984)	"To Live and Die in L.A." (1985)

Official audio
- "Wait" on YouTube

"Wait" is a single by the English new wave band Wang Chung, released as the fourth and final single from their second studio album, Points on the Curve (1983). The single reached No. 87 on the UK Singles Chart. Aside from the early singles released as Huang Chung, "Wait" was the only single by Wang Chung that failed to chart on the US Billboard Hot 100. However, it peaked at No. 17 on the US Billboard Hot Dance Club Play chart.

No music video was shot for "Wait", and it is also the only Wang Chung song to appear on two different non-compilation albums. "Wait" appears during the end credits of the neo-noir action thriller film To Live and Die in L.A. (1985) and is included in Wang Chung's soundtrack album for the film.

== Track listing ==
1. "Wait" (Remix)
2. "Dance Hall Days" (US Club edit)
3. "Dance Hall Days" (Part 2)

== Charts ==
Chart	Peak position
UK Singles (Official Charts)	87
US Dance Club Songs (Billboard)	17
