= Betrayed =

Betrayed or The Betrayed may refer to:

- Betrayal, a violation of trust

== Film and television ==
- Betrayed (1917 film), an American silent film by Raoul Walsh
- Betrayed, rerelease title of When Strangers Marry, a 1944 American suspense film directed by William Castle
- Betrayed (1954 film), an American war drama film directed by Gottfried Reinhardt
- Betrayed (1988 film), an American thriller film directed by Costa-Gavras
- Betrayed, a 2003 film featuring Alex House
- Betrayed (2020 film), a Norwegian film directed by Eirik Svensson.
- The Betrayed (1993 film), a Dutch television drama directed by Frans Weisz
- The Betrayed (2008 film), an American thriller by Amanda Gusack
- Betrayed (2016–2020), an American crime TV series on Investigation Discovery
- "Betrayed" (Law & Order: Criminal Intent), a 2008 television episode
- "Betrayed" (Scream), a 2015 television episode
- "Betrayed" (Secret Invasion), a 2023 television episode
- "The Betrayed" (Cardiac Arrest), a 1995 television episode

== Literature ==
- Betrayed (Cast novel), a 2007 House of Night novel by P. C. Cast and Kristin Cast
- Betrayed, a 2010 novel by Claire Robyns
- The Betrayed, a 2014 novel by Heather Graham Pozzessere
- The Betrayed, a novel by Michael Horbach, translated in 1959 by Robert Kee

== Music ==
- The Betrayed (Lostprophets album), 2010
- Betrayed (Can't Trust Nobody) or the title song, an album by Nationwide Rip Ridaz, 1999
- "Betrayed" (Lil Xan song), 2017
- "Betrayed", a song by Annihilator from Annihilator
- "Betrayed", a song by Avenged Sevenfold from City of Evil
- "Betrayed", a song by Norther from Mirror of Madness

== See also ==
- Betrayal (disambiguation)
