= Orchesography =

Orchesography is an enhanced form of choreography that includes details of the music to accompany the dance.

Orchesography may also refer to:

- Orchesography, dancing manual by Thoinot Arbeau (1598)
- Orchesography, dancing manual by Raoul Auger Feuillet (1701)
- Orchesography (album), by English new wave band Wang Chung
