= Basil Feldman, Baron Feldman =

British businessman (1923–2019)

Basil Feldman
- Baron Feldman
- Feldman in 2010
- Born: Basil Samuel Feldman; 23 September 1923
- Died: 19 November 2019 (aged 96)
- Spouse: Gita Julius
- Issue: 3 including Nick Feldman
- Father: Philip Feldman
- Mother: Tilly (Katz) Feldman
- Occupation: Businessman

Member of the House of Lords
- Lord Temporal
- Life peerage 15 January 1996 – 30 June 2017

Basil Samuel Feldman, Baron Feldman (23 September 1923 – 19 November 2019) was a British businessman who was a Conservative member of the House of Lords. He sat in the House from 1996 until his retirement in 2017.

== Biography ==
Feldman was born on 23 September 1923 to Tilly (née Katz; 1902–1977) and Philip Feldman, and was educated at the Grocers' School. Feldman began his first business in 1946, with Richard Beecham. Feldman was a former member of Lloyd's of London, and was the director of The Young Entrepreneurs Fund from 1985 to 1994. He has been described as a former plastic-toy magnate whose business interests reportedly included "Sindy dolls, aircraft kits and yo-yos".

== Family ==
Feldman married his wife Gita Julius in 1952. His younger sister was actress Fenella Fielding. He had two sons and a daughter. One of his sons is Nick Feldman, bass guitarist of the band Wang Chung. Feldman was a member of the Garrick and Carlton Clubs.

== Honours ==
He was knighted in the 1982 Birthday Honours. On 15 January 1996, he was made a life peer as Baron Feldman, of Frognal in the London Borough of Camden. His sponsors were Margaret Thatcher and Cecil Parkinson, and he was introduced to the House of Lords on 14 February 1996.

== Death ==
The Baron Feldman died on 19 November 2019 at the age of 96.

== Arms ==
Coat of arms of Basil Feldman, Baron Feldman

Crest
A mount issuant therefrom between two sprigs of basil both flowered a dexter cubit arm the hand grasping a wreath of laurel all Proper.
Escutcheon
Per chevron Argent guttee de sang and Gules guttee d'eau in chief two apple trees eradicated and fructed Proper and in base a phoenix rising from flames also Proper.
Supporters
Dexter a lion reguardant Or holding in the dexter paw a copper handbell and in the mouth a sprig of pink camellia both Proper sinister a hind reguardant Or gorged with a portcullis attached to a chain Sable and holding in the mouth a sprig of basil flowered Proper.
Motto
Melius Qui Citius (The Sooner The Better)
