= Tazer Up! =

Studio album by Wang Chung
- Released: 11 December 2012
- Genres: Rock; pop
- Length: 49:34
- Label: Digitally Sound

Wang Chung chronology
Abducted by the 80's (2010)	Tazer Up! (2012)	Orchesography (2019)

Tazer Up! is the sixth studio album by the English new wave band Wang Chung, released on 11 December 2012 by Digitally Sound Records. It was their first studio album since 1989's The Warmer Side of Cool.

== Track listing ==
=== CD ===
No.	Title	Length
1.	"City of Light"	3:28
2.	"Let's Get Along"	4:01
3.	"Rent Free"	3:30
4.	"Justify Your Tone"	4:49
5.	"Driving You"	5:33
6.	"Why?"	4:07
7.	"London Orbital"	4:28
8.	"Abducted by the 80's"	4:28
9.	"Overwhelming Feeling"	3:51
10.	"Stargazing"	7:18
11.	"Dance Hall Days" (Psychemagik Remix)	4:01
Total length:		49:34
