= Strictly Inc. =

Studio album by Strictly Inc.
- Released: 11 September 1995
- Recorded: 1994–1995
- Studio: The Farm (Chiddingfold, Surrey)
- Genre: Synth-pop; progressive rock
- Length: 62:59
- Label: Virgin (UK)
- Producer: Tony Banks; Nick Davis

Tony Banks chronology
Still (1991)	Strictly Inc. (1995)	Seven: A Suite For Orchestra (2004)

Singles from Strictly Inc.
- 1. "Only Seventeen" Released: 28 August 1995; 2. "Walls of Sound" Released: 8 January 1996

Strictly Inc. (originally 'Strictly Incognito') is the self-titled project album, released by Genesis keyboardist Tony Banks and Wang Chung lead vocalist Jack Hues, in 1995 on Virgin Records. Banks wanted the album release, as his title suggested, without reference to the band members, but the record company went against his wishes. This was Banks' fifth studio album, his second issued under a band name, his seventh album overall, and his most recent pop album.

It was released on 11 September 1995 in the UK. The album has never been released in the United States, although it is available for streaming. The album is called Strictly Inc. instead of Strictly Incognito because there was already a band in the UK named Incognito.

Three outtakes from the recording sessions exist: two untitled instrumentals and the song "Back to You", which was released as a B-side and which was co-written by Nik Kershaw.

== Critical reception ==
Professional ratings
Review scores
Source	Rating
AllMusic	2.5/5 stars

AllMusic praised "Tony Banks' distinctive, multi-layered keyboard playing", but contended that the album is a glaring failure due to a lack of memorable songs and the ineffectiveness of the combination of Jack Hues's vocals and Banks's music.

== Track listing ==
All tracks are written by Tony Banks, except where noted.

Side one
No.	Title	Length
1.	"Don't Turn Your Back on Me"	3:59
2.	"Walls of Sound"	5:07
3.	"Only Seventeen"	4:57
4.	"The Serpent Said"	5:28
5.	"Never Let Me Know"	6:20
6.	"Charity Balls"	4:38

Side two
No.	Title	Writer(s)	Length
7.	"Something to Live For"		5:17
8.	"A Piece of You"	Banks; Jack Hues	4:47
9.	"Strictly Incognito"	Banks; Hues	5:05
10.	"An Island in the Darkness"		17:21
Total length:			62:59

== Personnel ==
- Tony Banks – keyboards, bass (on 2–4)
- Jack Hues – vocals, guitars (on 1, 3–9)
- Daryl Stuermer – guitars (on 2, 10)
- Nathan East – bass (on 1, 5–7)
- John Robinson – drums
- John Challis – cover illustration

== Singles ==
- Only Seventeen (CD single) (August 28, 1995)
1. "Only Seventeen"
2. "Only Seventeen" (A Saabson/Svenson Remix)
3. "The Serpent Said"
4. "Only Seventeen" (House Mix by Andy Falconer)
- Walls of Sound (CD single) (January 8, 1996)
1. "Walls of Sound" (Remix) (Additional production and remix by Chris Hughes and Jack Hues)
2. "Back to You" – 4:51 (Words and music by Tony Banks and Nik Kershaw; vocals: Jack Hues)
3. "Only Seventeen" (Instrumental) – 4:57
