= Don't Be My Enemy =

Single by Wang Chung

from the album Points on the Curve
- B-side: "The Waves"
- Released: June 1983
- Recorded: 1983
- Studio: Abbey Road (London)
- Genre: New wave; dance-rock
- Length: 4:24
- Label: Geffen
- Songwriters: Nick Feldman; Jack Hues
- Producers: Chris Hughes; Ross Cullum

Wang Chung singles chronology
"Don't Let Go" (1984)	"Don't Be My Enemy" (1983)	"Wait" (1984)

Music video
- "Don't Be My Enemy" on YouTube

"Don't Be My Enemy" is a single by the English new wave band Wang Chung. It was the first single from their studio album Points on the Curve (1983) in the UK, where it reached No. 92 on July 16, 1983. In the US, it was released as the third single from the album, and reached No. 86 on the US Billboard Hot 100 in September 1984.

== Music video ==
The music video was directed by Dan Kleinman in 1984 and revolves around a female stage magician (portrayed by Susan Olar) who uses the band, performing the song, as subjects for her magic tricks, disappearing them or sawing them in half. In an attempt to defend himself, Jack Hues violently shakes the woman, but finds himself tricked into wrestling a mannequin. As the band performs the end of the song, the woman prepares to deal another blow, but notices the viewer and redirects her attack, ending the video.

== Track listing ==
1. "Don't Be My Enemy"
2. "The Waves" (Instrumental)

== Charts ==
Chart	Peak position
UK Singles (Official Charts)	92
US Billboard Hot 100	86
US Dance Club Songs (Billboard)	17
