= Act of Memory =

- Frame from the film
- Directed by: Jack Ryder
- Screenplay by: Jack Ryder
- Story by: Mary Grace Dembeck
- Produced by: David Pugh and Dafydd Rogers; Laura Crampsie
- Starring: Claire Skinner; Owen Teale; Anna Massey
- Cinematography: Pawel Biel
- Edited by: Fiona DeSouza
- Music by: Jack Hues
- Release date: 2012
- Running time: 12 minutes
- Country: United Kingdom

Act of Memory is a 2012 British 12-minute short film written and directed by Jack Ryder and produced by David Pugh, Dafydd Rogers and Laura Crampsie. The film stars Claire Skinner, Owen Teale, Anna Massey, and introduces Grace Cooper Milton as Maria. It was shot on location in Southwark, London in December 2010.

== Synopsis ==
When the holidays evoke a young girl's memories of her father, she is forced to choose between either continuing to run from them or embracing the spirit of Christmas. The film is set in England at Christmas in 1948 and is based upon the award-winning short story by Mary Grace Dembeck.

== Festivals and awards ==
- Official Selection, Garden State Film Festival, 2012
- Official Selection, Mrytle Beach International Film Festival, 2012
- Official Selection, Newport Beach Film Festival, 2012
- Cannes Film Festival, Short Film Corner, 2012
- Official Selection, 2012 Flickers Rhode Island International Film Festival
