= Hypnotize Me (Wang Chung song) =

Single by Wang Chung

from the album Mosaic
- B-side: "Lullaby"
- Released: 5 May 1987
- Genre: Pop rock
- Length: 4:41
- Label: Geffen
- Songwriters: Nick Feldman; Jack Hues
- Producer: Peter Wolf

Wang Chung singles chronology
| "Let's Go!" (1987) | "Hypnotize Me" (1987) | "Praying to a New God" (1989) |

Music video
- "Hypnotize Me" on YouTube

"Hypnotize Me" is a single by the English new wave band Wang Chung, released on 5 May 1987 as the final single from their fourth studio album, Mosaic (1986). The single reached No. 36 on both US Billboard Hot 100 and the US Cashbox chart, their last US Top 40 to date.

The single's B-side, "Lullaby", was originally on the soundtrack to the film To Live and Die in L.A., which was recorded by the band.

== Critical reception ==
Cashbox said that "Wang Chung's distinctive melodic and rhythmic instincts are on display here in this crafty, uptempo single." Cashbox also said that the song "has a hypnotic dance beat coupled with a bright pop sound" and "a spanking, martinet percussion [that] drives the tune from start to finish."

== Track listing ==
1. "Hypnotize Me" (Insomnia Mix)
2. "Hypnotize Me" (Innerspace Mix)
3. "Lullaby"

== Music video ==
The music video for "Hypnotize Me" was directed by Oley Sassone and filmed in black and white. The video is mainly set on lead vocalist Jack Hues wandering around an area hypnotized while singing the song. Nick Feldman is also seen in the background singing.

== Charts ==
| Chart (1987) | Peak position |
|---|---|
| Italy Airplay (Music & Media) | 5 |
| US Billboard Hot 100 | 36 |
| US Radio & Records CHR/Pop Airplay Chart | 29 |
| US Cashbox | 36 |
