= Lois Tilton =

American novelist

Lois Tilton is an American science fiction, fantasy, alternate history, and horror writer who has won the Sidewise Award and been a finalist for the Nebula Award. She has also written a number of innovative vampire stories.

== Writing career ==
Between 1985 and 2009, Tilton published more than 70 short stories in a number of publications including magazines such as Asimov's Science Fiction, Dragon, Fantasy and Science Fiction, Aboriginal Science Fiction, Amazing Stories, Weird Tales, Realms of Fantasy, Paradox, and Interzone. Her stories also appeared in anthologies such as The Best of Weird Tales, The Year's Best Science Fiction, Women of Darkness, Borderlands II, Adventures in the Twilight Zone, and Dead End: City Limits: An Anthology of Urban Fear along with multiple editions of the Sword and Sorceress series.

Tilton has also written media-related novels in the Babylon 5 and Deep Space Nine universes with her novel Betrayal spending 4 weeks on the USA Today best sellers list. In addition, Tilton is known as an author of "innovative contemporary vampire fiction." Her first novel, Vampire Winter, was released in 1990 and dealt with a vampire trying to survive in a world where humans have destroyed the planet in a nuclear war. Her novel Darkspawn, about a vampire prince who awakens to find his world overrun with barbarians, mixes a vampire tale with the sword and sorcery genre and was called "an innovative tale of horror" by Grahan Wilson and Paul Di Filippo in Realms of Fantasy.

Tilton's novel Written in Venom retells the story of Loki and his betrayal of Odin, with Don D'Ammassa in Science Fiction Chronicle calling the novel "a nicely untraditional variant" of Norse mythology. Written in Venom would be named to the preliminary ballot for the 2002 Nebula Award for Best Novel.

Tilton was a short fiction reviewer for the website Locus Online from March 2010 till January 2016. Previously, she reviewed short fiction for The Internet Review of Science Fiction.

== Awards ==
Tilton won the Sidewise Award for Alternate History in the short form category for her story "Pericles the Tyrant" in 2006. In 2005, her story, "The Gladiator's War" was a finalist for the Nebula Award for Best Novelette, the Theodore Sturgeon Award and the Sidewise Award.

== Bibliography ==
=== Novels ===
- Vampire Winter (1990)
- Darkness on the Ice (1993)
- Written in Venom (2000)
- Darkspawn (2000)

=== Star Trek novels ===
- Betrayal (1994)

=== Babylon 5 novels ===
- Babylon 5: Accusations (1995)

=== Short stories ===
- The Craft of War (1998) (collected in Harry Turtledove's anthology Alternate Generals)
