= Praying to a New God =

Single by Wang Chung

from the album The Warmer Side of Cool
- Released: May 1989 (US); July 1989 (UK)
- Genre: Rock
- Length: 3:58
- Label: Geffen
- Songwriter(s): Nick Feldman; Jack Hues
- Producer(s): Peter Wolf

Wang Chung singles chronology
"Hypnotize Me" (1987)	"Praying to a New God" (1989)	"Space Junk" (1997)

Music video
- "Praying to a New God" on YouTube

"Praying to a New God" is a single by the English new wave band Wang Chung. Released in April 1989, the song peaked at No. 63 on the Billboard Hot 100 on 27 May. The official music video for the song was directed by Andy Morahan.

== Charts ==
Chart	Peak position
US Billboard Hot 100	63
US Billboard Mainstream Rock Tracks	31
US Billboard Alternative Airplay	22
US Cashbox	57
