= Betrayal (Tilton novel) =

1994 novel by Lois Tilton

- Cover
- Author: Lois Tilton
- Cover artist: Keith Birdsong
- Language: English
- Series: Star Trek: Deep Space Nine
- Genre: Science fiction
- Publisher: Pocket Books
- Publication date: May 1994
- Publication place: United States
- Media type: Print (Paperback)
- Pages: 280
- ISBN: 0-671-88117-5 (first edition, paperback)
- OCLC: 30311803
- Preceded by: Fallen Heroes
- Followed by: Warchild

Betrayal is a science fiction novel by American writer Lois Tilton, part of the Star Trek: Deep Space Nine saga.

== Plot ==
Ambassadors from all over the Federation have assembled on Deep Space Nine for a conference that will determine the future of the planet Bajor. Keeping dozens of alien ambassadors happy is hard enough, but when hidden terrorists start blowing up the station, Commander Benjamin Sisko must track a hidden enemy who strikes at will. Then things get even worse: a new Cardassian commander arrives, demanding the return of Deep Space Nine to the Cardassian Empire. With Deep Space Nine now a dangerous minefield, Sisko must defuse a situation that threatens the very existence of the planet Bajor.

== Sales ==
Betrayal spent 4 weeks in the USA Today best sellers list, reaching a peak position of 29.
