= Of Hands and Hearts =

Of Hands and Hearts: Music for the Tsunami Disaster Fund

Compilation album by Various Artists
- Released: March 15, 2005
- Recorded: 1980; 1983; 1993; 1999-2005
- Genre: Rock, pop
- Length: 78:11 (Disc 1); 78:06 (Disc 2); 156:17(Total)
- Label: Integrity; INRD-127
- Producer: Stephen Schnee

Of Hands and Hearts: Music for the Tsunami Disaster Fund is a 2005 compilation album. The compilation was released in response to the 2004 Southeast Asia tsunami crisis. The title for the compilation is explained in the liner notes that executive producer Stephen Schnee's father, Duane John Schnee, "whose two and a half year battle with cancer has proven that with strength (hands) and love (hearts), we can face any tragedy together."

Also, according to the liner notes, executive producer Stephen Schnee wrote that this compilation album is "Dedicated to those who lost their lives on 12-26-04, and the families and loved ones they left behind. I was stunned to think that humanity had lost nearly 300,000 fathers, mothers, daughters and sons – people who were changing and shaping their own world. But in their passing, they changed and shaped everyone's world."

Of the 49 songs on the compilation, 18 had never been released before prior to the release of this compilation, and 8 had never been released in the US prior to the release of this compilation. Of the 49 artists who contributed a song to the compilation, 32 are from the US, 8 are from the UK, 3 are from Australia, 2 from Scotland, 1 from Italy, 1 from Japan, and 1 from Russia. Only R. Stevie Moore with Dave Gregory represent two different countries together (the former represents the US and the latter represents the UK).

== Track listing ==
=== Disc 1 ===
1. "All Over the World" – 3:54 (Paul Collin's Beat)
2. "Good Song" – 2:36 (The Talk)
3. "Try Five Times"* – 2:11 (Dramarama)
4. "Sleepy Vampire" – 3:32 (Eddie Spaghetti)
5. "I'll Learn" – 2:50 (Dillon Fence)
6. "Ticket to Japan" – 3:58 (The Red Elvises)
7. "Anodyne Dream"** – 3:52 (GANGgajang)
8. "She Is Light" – 3:19 (The Dotted Line)
9. "Major Label Interest" – 3:42 (Bang Sugar Bang)
10. "I Know (demo)"* – 1:35 (The Last)
11. "No Way"** – 2:45 (The Donkeys)
12. "Go Girl"** – 3:54 (Nine Below Zero)
13. "In the Worst Way"* – 3:39 (The Rubinoos)
14. "Sacred Ground"* – 4:08 (Annabella Lwin)
15. "Once Too Often"* – 3:46 (Dog Trumpet)
16. "Stuck in Time" – 2:58 (Barry Holdship)
17. "If I Could" – 2:56 (Jeremy)
18. "I Own the Ending" – 2:19 (Ray Mason Band)
19. "Star Trek"* – 3:34 (The Sunbeams)
20. "Silver Dollar Sunday" – 2:56 (The Lolas)
21. "Drive On"** – 2:22 (Rosetta Stone)
22. "Connection" – 2:48 (Midway)
23. "Fatal Shore (live)" – 4:56 (The Fixx)
24. "Who Will Hold You?"* – 3:41 (Joanne Hogg & Nick Beggs)

=== Disc 2 ===
1. "Bubblegum and Beer" – 3:17 (The Supersuckers)
2. "Someday Soon"* – 2:45 (The Waking Hours)
3. "Another Day in Pleasantville"** – 2:46 (Guitar Gangsters)
4. "Blingity Bling" – 2:35 (Suburban Legends)
5. "Dates" – 3:26 (R. Stevie Moore with Dave Gregory)
6. "Survival in the Wild" – 4:09 (Adrian Belew)
7. "Spring 1913"* – 2:17 (Chromosome Tea)
8. "It's My Fault" – 3:07 (Jeff Foskett)
9. "Akasha"* – 4:33 (Wang Chung)
10. "If You Knew (TW Walsh remix)"** – 2:43 (Easterly)
11. "Lady Luck"* – 3:52 (Wormstew)
12. "When You Give Your Love to Me (live)" – 3:12 (Kevin Gilbert & Thud)
13. "You Will Dance Again" – 2:39 (Kyle Vincent)
14. "Rising Stars"* – 4:29 (John Wicks)
15. "Here We Go Again"* – 3:40 (Underwater City People)
16. "We're the Kids"** – 2:32 (The Twinkles)
17. "Moron Man"* – 2:05 (Wonderboy)
18. "That's Just Wrong"* – 2:03 (The Virginia Sisters)
19. "Cu Ru Cu Pa" – 2:57 ("Joe King" Carrasco)
20. "A Normal Town"* – 3:40 (The Letter Openers)
21. "It Doesn't Get Better Than This" – 2:37 (Eugene Edwards)
22. "Peanut Butter"* – 3:11 (The Randies)
23. "The End of Time"** – 2:42 (BMX Bandits)
24. "Thinking About You" – 3:26 (Michael Carpenter)
25. "Beautiful"* – 3:23 (Bobby Whitlock & Kim Carmel)

*Previously unreleased
**Previously unreleased in the U.S.

== Credits ==
- Executive Producer: Stephen Schnee
- Cover Illustration & Lettering: Reg Mombassa
- Design & Layout: Jim "Eno" Roe
- Project Co-ordination & Sequencing: Stephen Schnee
- Sales, Promotion & Marketing: Mark Grindle & Ron Simms
- Liner Notes: Stephen Schnee with input and help from Franklin Thomas and the artists (as noted)
- Project Assistance: David Rayburn, Mark Grindle & Trent George
- Proofing & Editing: Kayt Owens & Franklin Thomas
  - Special Thanks to Jim "Eno" Roe, Connie, Katie, Emily & Timmy, Tommy Dunbar, Martina O’Doherty, Michael Schnee, Barney Cohen, Mark Grindle, Trent & Cindy George, David Rayburn, John Borack, Jon Rubin, Kayt Owens, Daisuke Kambe, Ed Spyra, Anna Borg, Adam Sloat, Mark Brennan, Jeremy Morris, Barry Holdship, Rene Thompson, Peter SKIP Beaumont-Edmonds, Nick Beggs, Francis MacDonald, Kristy Silvernail, Mike Paulsen, Jason Kosewick, Franklin Thomas, Shawn Potter, Elvera Butler, Michael Reed, Jason Fiber, Tony Wheatley, Paul Inder, Cary Beare, Chuck Morrison, Scott Carle, Will Birch, John Easdale, Chris Dixon, Dave Owens, Dizzy Detour, Bruce Brodeen, Michael Sattin, Chris Bailey, Mark Callaghan, Arturo Bassick, Terry Wachsmuth, Kevin Kirk, Laurie Cook and the 'kids', Chris Neal, Silver Needle, Toby at Fat Wreck Chords, www.kissorkillclub.com, Ralph Young, Matthew Wayne Selznick, Jason Hogg, Paul Donaldson, Ken & Cindy Widdal, Jeff Kenyon, Fred Grindle, Matthew Cibellis, Chuck Reddick, mom & dad, Dana & the House family, Kristin & the Stairs family, the Cooks and Rileys and Blankenships (and all of their subdivisions), all of the Wagoners and, finally, the folks at Norwalk Distributors.
