= Don't Let Go (Wang Chung song) =

Single by Wang Chung

from the album Points on the Curve
- B-side: "There Is a Nation"
- Released: February 1984 (US); April 1984 (UK)
- Recorded: 1983
- Studio: Abbey Road (London)
- Genre: Pop rock; new wave
- Length: 3:24 (single version); 4:21 (album version)
- Label: Geffen
- Songwriters: Nick Feldman; Jack Hues
- Producers: Chris Hughes; Ross Cullum

Wang Chung singles chronology
"Dance Hall Days" (1984)	"Don't Let Go" (1984)	"Don't Be My Enemy" (1984)

Music video
- "Don't Let Go" on YouTube

"Don't Let Go" is a single by the English new wave band Wang Chung. It was released as the first single from their second studio album Points on the Curve in Canada and the US in February 1984, peaking at number 26 and number 38 on those countries' respective pop singles charts. In the UK, "Don't Let Go" was the third single from the album, released in April 1984, and peaked at number 81 on the UK singles chart. The song also reached number 49 on the US Billboard Mainstream Rock Tracks and number one on the Dance Club Songs chart.

== Track listing ==
7" Geffen / 7-29377 (US)

1. "Don't Let Go" (Single Version) – 3:24
2. "There Is a Nation" – 3:37

12" Geffen / A 4272 (UK)

1. "Don't Let Go" (Special Version) – 7:11
2. "Ornamental Elephant" – 3:57

== Charts ==
Chart (1984)	Peak position
Australia (Kent Music Report)	94
UK Singles (Official Charts)	81
US Billboard Hot 100	38
US Radio & Records CHR/Pop Airplay Chart	35
US Dance Club Songs (Billboard)	1
US Mainstream Rock (Billboard)	49
