= Betrayer (video game) =

2014 video game

- Developer: Blackpowder Games
- Publisher: Blackpowder Games
- Engine: Unreal Engine 3
- Platform: Microsoft Windows
- Release: March 24, 2014
- Genres: Action-adventure, stealth
- Mode: Single-player

Betrayer is a first-person action-adventure video game developed by Blackpowder Games. The game was released on the Steam platform for the PC on March 24, 2014. Set in colonial Virginia in the 17th century, the game includes stealth elements, with players stalking their enemies and using colonial weaponry to defeat them. The game was removed from the Steam store. As of July 10, 2023, the game has been released on GOG for free.

== Gameplay ==
Betrayer is a stealth horror action-adventure played from a first-person perspective. It uses a monochrome art style that Eurogamer's Dan Whitehead described as "undeniably striking". The game has no clear missions or markers for quest objectives, aiming to initially perplex players by not providing a defined sense of direction. Sound plays a central role in exploring the game world, as it is used to lead the player to clues and other points of interest. While progressing, any clues found are meticulously documented in the inventory windows. Similar to The Elder Scrolls series, players can quickly navigate from one location to another by clicking a point-of-interest icon on the game's map.

In the game, players stealthily kill enemy conquistadors by creeping through tall grass and hiding their movements by timing them with strong gusts of wind. Enemies are killed using a variety of antiquated weaponry including bows, crossbows, pistols, muskets, and thrown tomahawks. Taking inspiration from Dark Souls, when the player dies in the game all of their items are left on their corpse at the location of death. The player then respawns at the base fort and must journey back to where they died to retrieve their items from their corpse. If the player dies again before retrieving their items, then the items on that first corpse will disappear and cannot be recovered.

== Plot ==
The protagonist begins the game washed up on a Virginian shore in Colonial America. A path leads the player to Fort Henry which is found abandoned.

He gradually discovers that the entire colony is uninhabited, with the former English colonists having seemingly been reduced to human-shaped ash figures. The area around the colony is also patrolled by hostile Spanish Conquistadores and Native American warriors whose bodies have been transformed into burning embers; both groups seem to have devolved into an almost animal-like state and will attack the protagonist relentlessly.

He soon encounters the only other living human in the area, a woman wearing a red hooded cloak referred to as the Maiden in Red. She has amnesia and cannot remember her name or where she came from, and tells the player that she does not see the Conquistadores or the human-shaped ash figures. He also discovers that by ringing a bell inside Ft. Henry, he is transported to a dark version of the world where hostile skeletons and evil spirits lurk. Inside this Otherworld, he encounters the spirits of the lost colonists; white Wraiths, who were alive at the time the colony was doomed, and black Shadows, colonists who had died (usually by violence) prior to the colony's doom.

Both the Wraiths and the Shadows have fractured memories of their lives, and the protagonist must search for clues and conduct investigations to learn the identity and past of each lost soul, in the process learning of the sins each of them have committed against each other, including suicide, murder, rape, and a false execution for witchcraft. In the process, the protagonist makes his way westward to further investigate the fate of the colony.

Over the course of the game, it is revealed that the former leader of the colony, Captain Benedict Harper, had journeyed west into forbidden territory in search of fabled treasure, and never returned. This created a rift between the colonists and their former Native American allies, who had previously forbidden any such expedition due to fears of awakening a great evil living in those lands, and which resulted in attacks by the natives against the colonists. The colonists also began to experience hostile paranormal activity in the aftermath of Harper's expedition. In Harper's absence, James Markley became governor of the colony. He was a selfish and paranoid man who greatly hated the natives. When James' daughter Tabitha fell in love with a native boy and became pregnant by him, she ran away to the native village knowing her father would be enraged. Upon learning of Tabitha's actions and perceiving them as a betrayal of his honor, James murdered his wife for not telling him of Tabitha's love affair, then pursued Tabitha into the area near the native village and murdered her for her miscegenation.

However, Tabitha's despair was so great it manifested as an overwhelming paranormal force of death, killing all life around her corpse and spreading out into the surrounding area. Her twin sister Allison went into the woods in search of her and, having discovered her corpse and the death she was creating, tried to burn her body in order to lay her to rest. However, this only fueled Tabitha's supernatural rage, resulting in a powerful wave of death that swept across the land and killed everyone, both natives and colonists, except for her sister Allison.

After helping the Maiden in Red remember her identity as Allison Markley, the protagonist is tasked with releasing the trapped souls of all the colonists, as their torment fuels Tabitha's power. The protagonist can either release each soul by telling them to let go of their regrets, or condemn them to eternal torment for their sins against each other. Once all souls have been either released or condemned, the protagonist travels to the location of Tabitha's corpse and, after defeating several waves of evil spirits summoned by her rage, speaks with her and convinces her to release her rage and move on. However, Tabitha informs him that she is being held in the world by her twin sister Allison. He speaks with Allison and convinces her to release her sister from this world by saying goodbye to her. Allison buries Tabitha and seems to be at peace, but abruptly reveals that she is not yet ready to let go of her twin sister. She apologizes for this just as it causes the protagonist to be teleported into the Otherworld and surrounded by the shadowy spirits of giants, at which point the game ends.

== Development ==
The game was developed by Blackpowder Games. Members of the development studio were previously employed by Monolith Productions and worked on the games F.E.A.R., The Operative: No One Lives Forever and Shogo: Mobile Armor Division.

The game was made available through the Steam Early Access platform, after which the final version was released on Steam on March 24, 2014. The game takes inspiration from a number of others including The Elder Scrolls series, Far Cry 3, Dark Souls, and Silent Hill.

== Reception ==
Reception

Aggregate score
| Aggregator | Score |
|---|---|
| Metacritic | 62/100 |

Review scores
| Publication | Score |
|---|---|
| GameSpot | 7/10 |
| IGN | 5/10 |

Betrayer received a score of 62 out of 100 on Metacritic's critic ratings. Writing for GameSpot, Cameron Woolsey gave the game 7 out of 10, concluding that "the macabre, eerie world of Betrayer is worth the time spent" but that "the game also begins to get repetitive" by the end. IGN gave Betrayer a score of 5 out of 10, stating that "the things you actually do in this world rarely come across as anything other than uninspired."
