= Claire Robyns =

Novelist

Claire Robyns (born 1968, Port Elizabeth, South Africa) is an author of historical and contemporary romances.

Robyns now resides in Berkshire, England, with her family. Robyns has twin sons, born in Cape Town, South Africa.

Her Scottish medieval romances are published by Carina Press, an imprint of Harlequin Enterprises. These include "Betrayed" and "The Devil of Jedburgh".

Robyns has also written a steampunk adventure/romance series called "Dark Matters" set in Victorian England.

Contemporary romance works include the "Corkscrew Bay" series and the "How to Love" series.

== Bibliography ==
Historical Romance Novels

- The Devil of Jedburgh (February 2012)
- Betrayed (July 2010)

Contemporary Romance Novels

- Falling for Alexander (Corkscrew Bay #2) (August 2013)
- How to Love a Best Friend (How to Love #2) (July 2013)
- Falling for the Guy Next Door (Corkscrew Bay #1) (January 2013)
- How to Love a Princess (How to Love #1) (October 2012)
- Second-Guessing Fate (September 2011)

Steampunk Romance Novels

- A Matter of Desire and Dirigibles (Dark Matters #3) (April 2014)
- A Matter of Propriety and Parasites (Dark Matters #2) (April 2013)
- A Matter of Circumstance and Celludrones (Dark Matters #1) (September 2012)

Urban Fiction Romance Series

- Where Dark Collides (Part One) (Shades of Dark series) (July 2014)
