= Huang Chung (album) =

1982 Wang Chung album

Studio album by Huang Chung
- Released: March 1982
- Recorded: 1981
- Studio: The Gallery (Chertsey); Basing Street (London); Jam Studios (London)
- Genre: New wave
- Length: 38:15
- Label: Arista
- Producer: Rhett Davies; Roger Béchirian

Huang Chung chronology
| Huang Chung (1982) | Points on the Curve (1984) |

Alternative cover
- US release cover

Singles from Huang Chung
- 1. "Hold Back the Tears" Released: July 1981; 2. "China" Released: January 1982; 3. "Ti Na Na" Released: March 1982

Professional ratings
Review scores
| Source | Rating |
|---|---|
| AllMusic | 2/5 stars |

Huang Chung is the self-titled debut studio album by the English new wave band Huang Chung (later known as Wang Chung), released in March 1982 by Arista Records.

== Background ==
The album cover features the name of the band in Chinese (黃鐘, literally Yellow Bell), meaning the first note in the Chinese classical music scale. All four members appear on the album under pseudonyms: Jeremy Ryder (as Jack Hues); Nick Feldman (as Nick De Spig); Darren Costin (as Darwin); and Dave Burnand (as Hogg).

Huang Chung was initially intended to be the first of two studio albums that the band recorded for Arista, but they left for Geffen Records following its release because their manager spotted the band's potential and felt their upcoming song, "Dance Hall Days", would potentially become a hit. Following its release, Burnand left the band, due to "musical differences". None of the album's singles charted.

On 19 September 1995, One Way Records re-released the album on CD under license from Arista.

== Track listing ==
=== UK version ===
All tracks are written by Jack Hues, except as noted.

Side one
| No. | Title | Writer(s) | Length |
|---|---|---|---|
| 1. | "Ti Na Na" | | 4:22 |
| 2. | "Hold Back the Tears" | | 4:05 |
| 3. | "I Never Want to Love You in a Half Hearted Way" | | 3:11 |
| 4. | "Straight from My Heart" | | 2:52 |
| 5. | "Dancing" | Hues; Nick De Spig | 4:38 |
| Total length: | | | 19:09 |

Side two
| No. | Title | Writer(s) | Length |
|---|---|---|---|
| 1. | "Chinese Girls" | | 2:51 |
| 2. | "Why Do You Laugh" | Hues; De Spig | 4:06 |
| 3. | "China" | Hues; De Spig | 3:27 |
| 4. | "I Can't Sleep" | | 3:15 |
| 5. | "Rising in the East" | | 5:27 |
| Total length: | | | 19:06 |

=== US version ===
Side one
| No. | Title | Writer(s) | Length |
|---|---|---|---|
| 1. | "Hold Back the Tears" | | 4:05 |
| 2. | "I Never Want to Love You in a Half-Hearted Way" | | 3:11 |
| 3. | "Ti Na Na" | | 4:22 |
| 4. | "Straight from My Heart" | | 2:52 |
| 5. | "Dancing" | Hues; De Spig | 4:38 |
| Total length: | | | 19:09 |

Side two
| No. | Title | Writer(s) | Length |
|---|---|---|---|
| 1. | "China" | Hues; De Spig | 3:27 |
| 2. | "Rising in the East" | | 5:27 |
| 3. | "Chinese Girls" | | 2:51 |
| 4. | "Why Do You Laugh" | Hues; De Spig | 4:06 |
| 5. | "I Can't Sleep" | | 3:15 |
| Total length: | | | 19:06 |

== Personnel ==
Huang Chung

- Darwin – drums, percussion, vocals
- Hogg – saxophones, percussion, vocals
- Nick de Spig – bass guitars, percussion, vocals
- Jack Hues – guitars, lead vocals, piano

Technical

- Rhett Davies – producer (1–5, 7, 10)
- Roger Béchirian – producer (6, 8, 9), mixing (3, 7)
- Fin Costello – photos
- Steve Joule – design
- Alex Feldman – logo design
- Nigel Mills – engineer
- Stuart Henderson – engineer
- Dave Bellotti – engineer
