= The Warmer Side of Cool =

Studio album by Wang Chung
- Released: 23 May 1989
- Studio: 41B Studios (Westlake Village)
- Genres: Rock; hard rock; synth-rock; pop rock
- Length: 52:04
- Label: Geffen
- Producer: Peter Wolf

Wang Chung chronology
Mosaic (1986)	The Warmer Side of Cool (1989)	Everybody Wang Chung Tonight: Wang Chung's Greatest Hits (1997)

Singles from The Warmer Side of Cool
- 1. "Praying to a New God" Released: May 1989

Professional ratings
Review scores
Source	Rating
AllMusic	2/5 stars

The Warmer Side of Cool is the fifth studio album by the English new wave band Wang Chung, released in May 1989 by Geffen Records. The album marked an artistic transition from the new wave sound of their previous albums into a more traditional rock sound.

== Reception ==
Commercially, the album peaked at No. 123 on the Billboard 200 in its sixth and final week on the chart. Despite poor sales, the album yielded a minor hit with "Praying to a New God", which peaked at No. 63 on the Billboard Hot 100 on May 27, 1989. Another song, "Swing", was scheduled to be the second single from the album, but its release was ultimately cancelled.

In a retrospective review, Kelvin Hayes of AllMusic awarded the album two out of five stars, opining that the band had focused too heavily on the then-contemporary mainstream rock sound, although he did praise several of the album's tracks as "good melodic rock."

== Track listing ==
Side one
No.	Title	Writer(s)	Length
1.	"Praying to a New God"	Nick Feldman, David Chandler, Jack Hues	3:58
2.	"What’s So Bad About Feeling Good?"	Feldman, Hues, Chandler	4:11
3.	"Snakedance"	Hues	4:58
4.	"Swing"	Feldman	4:29
5.	"When Love Looks Back at You"	Hues	4:50
6.	"Games of Power"	Feldman	4:53
Total length:			27:19

Side two
No.	Title	Writer(s)	Length
1.	"At the Speed of Life"	Hues	5:26
2.	"The Warmer Side of Cool"	Hues	4:42
3.	"Logic and Love"	Feldman	4:04
4.	"Tall Trees in a Blue Sky"	Hues	4:21
5.	"Big World"	Hues	6:12
Total length:			24:45

== Personnel ==
Wang Chung

- Jack Hues – guitars, lead vocals
- Nick Feldman – bass guitar, back-up vocals

Additional musicians

- Peter Wolf – keyboards; tribal vocals (8)
- Vinnie Colaiuta – drums (3–5, 7, 8, 10, 11)
- Michael Baird – drums (2, 6, 9)
- Bryan Hitt – drums (1)
- Mikal Reid – guitar (6, 9)
- Pete McCray – guitar (9)
- Paulinho Da Costa – percussion (6, 8)
- Bill Reichenbach Jr. – trombone (4)
- Joe Pizzulo – backing vocals (2, 6, 9, 10, 11)
- Gary Falcone – backing vocals (2, 6, 9, 10, 11)
- Roger Freeland – backing vocals (2, 6, 9, 10, 11)
- Jeff Pescetto – backing vocals (2, 6, 9, 10, 11)
- Darren Costin – backing vocals (1)
- Ina Wolf – backing vocals (1)
- Bill Clift – tribal vocals (8)
- Allan Ryder – tribal vocals (8)
- Jeremy Smith – vocal percussion (3)

Technical

- Peter Wolf – producer, arranger
- Jeremy Smith – engineer (1, 3–5, 7, 8); mixing
- Gonzalo "Bino" Espinoza – second engineer (1, 3–5, 7, 8), engineer (2, 6, 9–11)
- Carlos Golliher – second engineer (2, 6, 9–11)
- Lynn Robb – art direction, design
- Ron Chadwick – collage
- Victoria Pearson-Cameron – Wang Chung photos
- Reed Davis – photo of Asian boy
- Vitamvas/Camera Agency – photo of kangaroo
- Atlantic Antique Centres – photo of interior
- Julia Whitty – photo of dolphin
- Kevin W. Kelley – aerial photography (from The Home Planet, 1988)
- Stephen Marcussen – album mastering
- Dan Hersch – cassette and compact disc mastering

== Chart performance ==
Chart (1989)	Peak position
Canada Top Albums/CDs (RPM)	68
U.S. Billboard 200	123
