= Let's Go! (Wang Chung song) =

1987 Single by Wang Chung

Single by Wang Chung

from the album Mosaic
- B-side: "The World in Which We Live"
- Released: 6 January 1987 (US); 4 May 1987 (UK)
- Recorded: 1986
- Genre: New wave
- Length: 4:32 (album version); 3:49 (single version)
- Label: Geffen
- Songwriters: Nick Feldman; Jack Hues
- Producer: Peter Wolf

Wang Chung singles chronology
"Everybody Have Fun Tonight" (1986)	"Let's Go!" (1987)	"Hypnotize Me" (1987)

Music video
- "Let's Go!" on YouTube

"Let's Go!" is a single by the English new wave band Wang Chung, released on 6 January 1987 from their fourth studio album, Mosaic (1986). The single was a hit for the band in the United States, where it provided them with their second and last Top 10 hit on the Billboard Hot 100 in April 1987, peaking at No. 9. The single also formed the basis for its official music video. It also hit No. 9 on the Canada RPM Top 100 Singles chart. Jack Hues sings the verses of the song, and Nick Feldman sings the bridge. Both sing the chorus.

== Critical reception ==
Cashbox called it an "effervescent, soulful pop workout."

== Track listing ==
=== 7": Geffen / 7-28531 (US) ===
1. "Let's Go!" – 3:49
2. "Betrayal" – 4:40

=== 12": Geffen / GEF 17T (GER) ===
- Side one
1. "Let's Go!" (Shep's Mix)
2. "Let's Dub"
- Side two
1. "Let's Go!" (Edit)
2. "To Live and Die in L.A."

=== 12" Maxi: Geffen / 0-20602 (USA) ===
- Side one
1. "Let's Go!" (Shep's Mix) – 8:00
2. "Let's Dub" – 6:08
- Side two
1. "Let's Go!" (Edit) – 3:52
2. "Betrayal (LP Version)" – 4:40

=== 12" Maxi: Geffen / 92 06020 (CAN) ===
- Side one
1. "Let's Go!" (Shep's Mix) – 8:00
2. "Let's Dub" – 6:08
- Side two
1. "Let's Go!" (Edit) – 3:52
2. "The World in Which We Live (LP Version)" – 7:04

=== 7" Geffen: / 928 531-7 (GER) ===
1. "Let's Go!" – 4:05
2. "The World in Which We Live" – 7:04

== Charts ==
=== Weekly charts ===
Chart (1987)	Peak position
Australia (Kent Music Report)	14
Belgium (Ultratop 50 Flanders)	31
Canada Top Singles (RPM)	9
Ireland (IRMA)	20
New Zealand (Recorded Music NZ)	19
UK Singles (Official Charts)	81
US Billboard Hot 100	9
US Cashbox	10
US Radio & Records CHR/Pop Airplay Chart	5
US Dance Club Songs (Billboard)	41
US Mainstream Rock Tracks (Billboard)	18

=== Year-end charts ===
Chart (1987)	Position
Australia (Kent Music Report)	69
