= Traición =

Traición (Spanish: "Betrayal") may refer to:

- Traición (film), a 1923 silent film
- Traición (TV series), a 2017 TV series
- "Traición", a 1994 song by Hermética, from Víctimas del Vaciamiento
- "Traición", a 2004 song by Miranda! from Sin Restricciones
