= The Great Betrayal =

The Great Betrayal may refer to:

== Books ==
- The Great Betrayal: Constantinople 1204, a 1967 book by Ernle Bradford
- The Great Betrayal (Naumenko book), a 1962 and 1970 two-volume book by Vyacheslav Naumenko about the repatriations of Cossacks after World War II.
- Two on British double agent Kim Philby:
  - The Great Betrayal: The Untold Story of Kim Philby's Biggest Coup, a 1978 book by Nicholas Bethell
  - A Spy Among Friends: Kim Philby and the Great Betrayal, a 2014 book by Ben Macintyre
- The Great Betrayal: Britain, Australia and the Onset of the Pacific War, 1939–42, a 1988 book by David Day
- The Great Betrayal, a 1992 book by poet Brian Cox
- The Great Betrayal: The Memoirs of Ian Douglas Smith, a 1997 autobiography
- The Great Betrayal: How American Sovereignty and Social Justice Are Being Sacrificed to the Gods of the Global Economy, a 1998 book by Pat Buchanan
- The Great Betrayal: Fraud in Science, a 2004 book by Horace Freeland Judson
- The Great Betrayal: The True Story of Brexit, a 2019 book by Rod Liddle

== Films and television ==
- The Great Betrayal, a 2001 Kenyan film

== Others ==
- "The Great Betrayal", a 1907 event in the history of the Bradford Park Avenue A.F.C.
- "The Great Betrayal", a term for the U.S. Compromise of 1877; see Disenfranchisement after the Reconstruction era
- "The Great Betrayal", a spoken word track from the Jello Biafra album Machine Gun in the Clown's Hand
