= Mosaic (Wang Chung album) =

Studio album by Wang Chung
- Released: 14 October 1986
- Studios: Videosonics (London, England); Sound Mill Studios (Vienna, Austria)
- Genre: Dance-pop
- Length: 40:06
- Label: Geffen
- Producer: Peter Wolf

Wang Chung chronology
To Live and Die in L.A. (1985)	Mosaic (1986)	The Warmer Side of Cool (1989)

Alternative cover
- Alternate album cover

Singles from Mosaic
- 1. "Everybody Have Fun Tonight" Released: September 1986; 2. "Let's Go!" Released: 6 January 1987; 3. "Hypnotize Me" Released: 5 May 1987

Professional ratings
Review scores
Source	Rating
AllMusic	3/5 stars

Mosaic is the fourth studio album by the English new wave band Wang Chung, released on 14 October 1986 by Geffen Records. The album was commercially successful, producing three US Top 40 songs: "Everybody Have Fun Tonight" (peaked at No. 2 on the Billboard Hot 100), "Let's Go!" (No. 9 on the Hot 100), and "Hypnotize Me" (No. 36 on the Hot 100). Mosaic earned a Gold certification by the RIAA and peaked at No. 41 on the Billboard 200 album charts.

== Track listing ==
All tracks are written by Wang Chung, except where noted.

Side one
No.	Title	Writer(s)	Length
1.	"Everybody Have Fun Tonight"	Wang Chung; Wolf	4:47
2.	"Hypnotize Me"		4:42
3.	"The Flat Horizon"		4:49
4.	"Betrayal"	Wang Chung; Wolf	4:40
Total length:			18:58

Side two
No.	Title	Writer(s)	Length
1.	"Let's Go!"		4:30
2.	"Eyes of the Girl"		4:50
3.	"A Fool and His Money"	Michael Lesson; Peter Vale; Jack Hues; Wolf	4:44
4.	"The World in Which We Live"		7:04
Total length:			21:08

== Personnel ==
Wang Chung

- Jack Hues – lead vocals, keyboards, guitars
- Nick Feldman – vocals, keyboards, guitars, bass guitar, additional lead vocal (5)

Additional musicians

- Peter Wolf – keyboards, Synclavier, drums, choral voices
- Dann Huff – additional guitars (2)
- Harry Sokal – alto saxophone, soprano saxophone, tenor saxophone
- Otmar Klein – alto saxophone, tenor saxophone
- Herbert Graf – baritone saxophone
- Hannes Kottek – trumpet
- Siedah Garrett – soprano vocals; voice of woman (3)
- Julia Waters – soprano vocals
- Ina Wolf – (alto?) vocals
- Oren Waters – vocals
- Phil Perry – vocals
- Joe Pizzulo – vocals
- Michael McDonald – vocals; voice of man (7)
- Phillip Ingram – vocals
- Kevin Dorsey – vocals

Production

- Peter Wolf – producer, arrangements
- Brian Malouf – engineer, recording, mixing
- Peter Müller – engineer
- Tim Alban – assistant engineer
- Marvin Wolf – assistant engineer
- Jim Dineen – recording assistant
- Steve Ford – mix assistant (2)
- Bernie Grundman – mastering at Bernie Grundman Mastering (Hollywood, California)
- Norman Moore – art direction, design
- Simon Fowler – photography
- David Massey – management

== Chart performance ==
=== Weekly charts ===
Chart (1986)	Peak position
Australia (Kent Music Report)	94
Canada Top Albums/CDs (RPM)	27
US Billboard 200	41

=== Year-end charts ===
Chart (1987)	Position
US Billboard 200	81

== Certifications ==
Organization	Level	Date
RIAA – USA	Gold	2 October 1997
