= Points on the Curve =

Studio album by Wang Chung
- Released: February 1984 (US); March 1984 (UK)
- Recorded: 1983
- Studio: Abbey Road (London)
- Genres: Synth-pop; dance
- Length: 43:15
- Label: Geffen
- Producers: Chris Hughes; Ross Cullum

Wang Chung chronology
Huang Chung (1982)	Points on the Curve (1984)	To Live and Die in L.A. (1985)

Singles from Points on the Curve
- 1. "Don't Be My Enemy" Released: June 1983; 2. "Dance Hall Days" Released: December 1983; 3. "Don't Let Go" Released: February 1984 (US); 4. "Wait" Released: June 1984

Points on the Curve is the second studio album by the English new wave band Wang Chung, released in February 1984 by Geffen Records.

== Background ==
Points on the Curve is Wang Chung's first studio album since changing their name from Huang Chung and switching from Arista to Geffen Records. It reached No. 34 on the UK Albums Chart on 21 April 1984 and No. 30 on the Billboard 200 chart on 14 July 1984. The album features the No. 1 dance single "Dance Hall Days" and includes the hit singles: "Don't Let Go", "Don't Be My Enemy" and "Wait". The album cover was designed, and featured art direction by Barney Bubbles, who had died the year before this album was released.

== Critical reception ==
Professional ratings
Review scores
Source	Rating
AllMusic	4/5 stars
The Philadelphia Inquirer	1/5 stars
Smash Hits	5/10

The Philadelphia Inquirer deemed the band "mean-spirited fops." The Daily Breeze called the album "a collection of fairly standard, English dance numbers." By contrast, in a retrospective review for AllMusic, Kelvin Hayes wrote that "although the sound is a little dated, its craftsmanship still holds true."

== Track listing ==
=== Original UK LP track listing ===
All tracks are written by Jack Hues, except where noted.

Side one
No.	Title	Writer(s)	Length
1.	"Don't Let Go"	Hues; Nick Feldman	4:20
2.	"Dance Hall Days"	Hues; Feldman; Darren Costin	3:49
3.	"True Love"	Hues; Feldman	3:51
4.	"Devoted Friends"		4:08
5.	"Talk It Out"	Hues; Feldman	4:52
Total length:			21:00

Side two
No.	Title	Writer(s)	Length
1.	"Even If You Dream"	Hues; David Burnand	4:06
2.	"Don't Be My Enemy"	Hues; Feldman; Costin	4:18
3.	"The Waves"	Hues; Feldman; Costin	4:17
4.	"Look at Me Now"		4:26
5.	"Wait"		5:46
Total length:			22:52

=== Track listing on most CDs, cassettes, and LPs from other regions ===
No.	Title	Writer(s)	Length
1.	"Dance Hall Days"	Hues; Feldman; Costin	3:58
2.	"Wait"		4:22
3.	"True Love"	Hues; Feldman	3:51
4.	"The Waves"	Hues; Feldman; Costin	4:26
5.	"Look at Me Now"		4:36
6.	"Don't Let Go"	Hues; Feldman	4:21
7.	"Even If You Dream"	Hues; Burnand	4:08
8.	"Don't Be My Enemy"	Hues; Feldman; Costin	4:24
9.	"Devoted Friends"		4:07
10.	"Talk It Out"	Hues; Feldman	4:48
Total length:			43:01

== Personnel ==
Credits are adapted from the Points on the Curve liner notes.

Wang Chung

- Nick Feldman – bass guitar, keyboards, guitar, vocals
- Jack Hues – lead vocals, keyboards, guitar
- Darren Costin – drums, percussion, keyboards, vocals

Additional musicians

- Mel Collins – saxophone
- Chris Hughes – rhythm, sequence, and computer programming
- Paul Ridout – MC4 programming

Technical

- Chris Hughes – producer, engineer
- Ross Cullum – producer, engineer
- Mark McGuire – assistant engineer
- Greg Fulginiti – original mastering
- Barney Bubbles – design, art director
- Brian Griffin – front cover photograph
- Paul Cox – back cover photograph
- Ronn Spencer – hand tinting
- Mark Ryder – black & white photographs

== Chart performance ==
=== Weekly charts ===
Chart (1984)	Peak position
Australia (Kent Music Report)	56
Canada Top Albums/CDs (RPM)	19
US Billboard 200	30
UK Top 75 Albums	34

=== Year-end charts ===
Chart (1984)	Rank
US Billboard Hot 100	59

== Certifications ==
Certifications and sales for Points on the Curve
Region	Certification	Certified units/sales
Canada (Music Canada)	Gold	50,000^{^}
^{^} Shipments figures based on certification alone.
