= To Live and Die in L.A. (Wang Chung song) =

Single by Wang Chung

from the album To Live and Die in L.A. soundtrack
- B-side: "Black–Blue–White"
- Released: 25 September 1985
- Genre: New wave
- Length: 4:53 (album version); 3:53 (single version)
- Label: Geffen
- Songwriters: Nick Feldman; Jack Hues
- Producer: Jolley & Swain

Wang Chung singles chronology
"Wait" (1984)	"To Live and Die in L.A." (1985)	"Wake Up, Stop Dreaming" (1985)

Music video
- "To Live and Die in L.A." on YouTube

"To Live and Die in L.A." is a song from the soundtrack of the same name by the English new wave band Wang Chung. Released on 25 September 1985 by Geffen Records, the single peaked on the US Billboard Hot 100 at No. 41.

== Background ==
On the To Live and Die in L.A. DVD audio commentary, director William Friedkin stated to Wang Chung that he "didn’t want a theme song for To Live and Die in L.A." One day, though, Jack Hues and Nick Feldman gave Friedkin a copy of "To Live and Die in L.A." (to his dismay). Surprisingly, Friedkin was impressed and decided to keep the song as part of the film and soundtrack.

The album version includes additional lyrics not included in the single version.

The song is used as the intro music to John Mulaney Presents: Everybody's in LA (2024), and its successor show Everybody's Live with John Mulaney (2025–present).

== Critical reception ==
Cashbox said that the song "melds its own synth dance fusion with a clear cut pop sensibility which is alluring and ultimately triumphant" and that it captures "the city’s sense of 'loneliness within a maze of people.'"

== Charts ==
Chart (1986)	Peak position
US Billboard Hot 100	41
US Radio & Records CHR/Pop Airplay Chart	30
US Mainstream Rock Tracks (Billboard)	21
