= To Live and Die in L.A. (soundtrack) =

1985 soundtrack album by Wang Chung

Studio album / soundtrack by Wang Chung
- Released: 30 September 1985
- Length: 38:37
- Label: Geffen
- Producers: Wang Chung; Tony Swain; Steve Jolley; David Motion; Chris Hughes; Ross Cullum

Wang Chung chronology
Points on the Curve (1984)	To Live and Die in L.A. (1985)	Mosaic (1986)

Singles from To Live and Die in L.A.
- 1. "To Live and Die in L.A." Released: 25 September 1985; 2. "Wake Up, Stop Dreaming" Released: December 1985 (Netherlands)

To Live and Die in L.A. is the third studio album by the English new wave band Wang Chung. It was released on 30 September 1985 by Geffen and is their first recording as the duo of lead vocalist Jack Hues and bassist Nick Feldman, following the departure of drummer Darren Costin. The album served as the soundtrack for the 1985 film To Live and Die in L.A., directed by William Friedkin.

The album peaked at No. 85 on the US Billboard 200 but it failed to chart in their home country. The album's title track, "To Live and Die in L.A.", was released as the first single from the album and peaked at No. 41 on the US Billboard Hot 100. "Wake Up, Stop Dreaming" was the second single to be released from the album but failed to chart.

Universal Music Enterprises re-released the album on vinyl in 2015.

== Background ==
While working on the follow-up album to their successful 1984 album Points on the Curve, Wang Chung found themselves dissatisfied with the results and asked their manager about the possibility of working on a soundtrack. According to William Friedkin, director of the film To Live and Die in L.A., the main reason he chose Wang Chung to compose the soundtrack was because the band "stands out from the rest of contemporary music... What they finally recorded has not only enhanced the film, it has given it a deeper, more powerful dimension." He was speaking in direct reference to the band's previous studio album, Points on the Curve (1984). Friedkin particularly enjoyed "Wait" and "Dance Hall Days" and included them on the film's soundtrack. Every song on the soundtrack, excluding the title song, "Dance Hall Days" and "Wait", was written and recorded within a two-week period. Only after Wang Chung saw a rough draft of the film did they produce the title song.

On the original vinyl and cassette release, side one was all vocal tracks, side two all instrumental.

== Critical reception ==
Professional ratings
Review scores
Source	Rating
AllMusic	3/5 stars

In a retrospective review for AllMusic, critic Kelvin Hayes wrote that "To Live and Die in L.A. will appeal to those who enjoy the more dramatic spheres of Wang Chung's music." Concluding that the album is "a good budget-priced recording for those with the right set of ears."

== Track listing ==
All tracks are written by Wang Chung.

Side one – vocal
No.	Title	Producer(s)	Length
1.	"To Live and Die in L.A."	Tony Swain; Steve Jolley	4:53
2.	"Lullaby"		4:43
3.	"Wake Up, Stop Dreaming"	Wang Chung; David Motion	4:35
4.	"Wait"	Chris Hughes; Ross Cullum	4:26
Total length:			18:37

Side two – instrumental
No.	Title	Length
1.	"City of the Angels"	9:17
2.	"The Red Stare"	3:11
3.	"Black–Blue–White"	2:23
4.	"Every Big City"	5:09
Total length:		20:00

== Personnel ==
Wang Chung

- Jack Hues
- Nick Feldman

Technical

- Wang Chung – producers (2, 3, 5–8)
- David Motion – engineer; assistant producer (3)
- Tony Swain – producer (1)
- Steve Jolley – producer (1)
- Chris Hughes – producer (4)
- Ross Cullum – producer (4)
- Brad Davis – engineer (2)
- Greg Fulginiti – mastering
- Steve Gerdes – art direction, design
- Pablo Ferro – graphic design
- William Friedkin – liner notes

== Chart performance ==
Chart	Peak position
US Billboard 200	85
