= Everybody Have Fun Tonight =

1986 single by Wang Chung

Single by Wang Chung

from the album Mosaic
- B-side: "Fun Tonight: The Early Years"
- Released: September 1986
- Recorded: 1986
- Genre: Dance-rock; funk-pop
- Length: 4:47 (album version); 3:59 (7-inch edit)
- Label: Geffen
- Songwriters: Nick Feldman; Jack Hues; Peter Wolf
- Producer: Peter Wolf

Wang Chung singles chronology
"Wake Up, Stop Dreaming" (1985)	"Everybody Have Fun Tonight" (1986)	"Let's Go!" (1987)

Music video
- "Everybody Have Fun Tonight" on YouTube

"Everybody Have Fun Tonight" is a song by the English new wave band Wang Chung, released as a single from their fourth studio album Mosaic in 1986.

== History ==
Collaboratively written by Jack Hues, Nick Feldman, and Peter Wolf, it reached no. 2 on the US Billboard Hot 100 chart during the 1986 Christmas season. It also reached No. 1 on the Cashbox charts for 3 weeks, and topped the Canada RPM Top 100 Singles chart for the week of 17 January 1987. With some different lyrics, the original ballad version of the song was placed on the B-side.

In 2005, Wang Chung performed the song on the American television show Hit Me, Baby, One More Time alongside a cover of Nelly's "Hot in Herre". The song was later featured in the second trailer for the upcoming 2026 video game, Grand Theft Auto VI.

== Critical reception ==
Billboard called it a "self-celebrating dance rocker" that "[coins] a new verb."

== Track listing ==
7-inch Geffen / 7-28562 (USA)

1. "Everybody Have Fun Tonight (edit)"
2. "Fun Tonight: The Early Years"

7-inch Geffen / GEF 13F (UK)

- Side one
1. "Everybody Have Fun Tonight (edit)"
2. "Fun Tonight: The Early Years"
- Side two
1. "Dance Hall Days"
2. "Don't Let Go"

7-inch Geffen / P-2193 (JPN)

1. "Everybody Have Fun Tonight (edit)"
2. "Fun Tonight: The Early Years"

12-inch Geffen / 0-20551 (USA) and TA 2589 (UK)

- Side one
1. "Everybody Have Fun Tonight (12 Inches of Fun)" – 6:45
2. "Everybody Have Fun Tonight (edit)" – 3:59*
- Side two
1. "Everybody Dub Tonight" – 6:02*
2. "Fun Tonight: The Early Years" – 4:12

*times as indicated on the record label (not actual)

== Music video ==
The music video, directed by Godley & Creme, features scenes of the band playing in a wood-lined room with very rapid editing between different takes of the same performance. The band, additional musicians, and dancers are seen in several formations throughout the video. They are shown in close portrait and seated along a row of chairs; the seating arrangement changes with each take. Each shot flips through up to four takes of the same shot, with some shots approaching up to 1/25th of a second between edits. The video was later banned from airing after its premiere when a medical expert retained by the BBC's screening committee stated it could trigger "epileptic fits".

== Other versions ==
In 2020, Wang Chung released a rewritten version of the song known as "Everybody Stay Safe Tonight" featuring the American pop and jazz singer Valerie Day. The rewritten lyrics reflected the COVID-19 pandemic and the Black Lives Matter movement. It was released on 8 June 2020.

== Charts ==
=== Weekly charts ===
Chart (1986–1987)	Peak position
Australia (Kent Music Report)	8
Belgium (Ultratop 50 Flanders)	19
Canada Retail Singles (The Record)	1
Canada Top Singles (RPM)	1
Italy Airplay (Music & Media)	10
Netherlands (Single Top 100)	28
New Zealand (Recorded Music NZ)	23
UK Singles (Official Charts)	76
US Billboard Hot 100	2
US Cash Box Top 100	1
US Dance Club Songs (Billboard)	4
US Album Rock Tracks (Billboard)	25
US CHR/Pop Airplay Chart (Radio & Records)	1

=== Year-end charts ===
Chart (1987)	Position
Australia (Kent Music Report)	57
Canada Top Singles (RPM)	40
US Top Pop Singles (Billboard)	12
