= Wang Chung (band) =

British new wave band

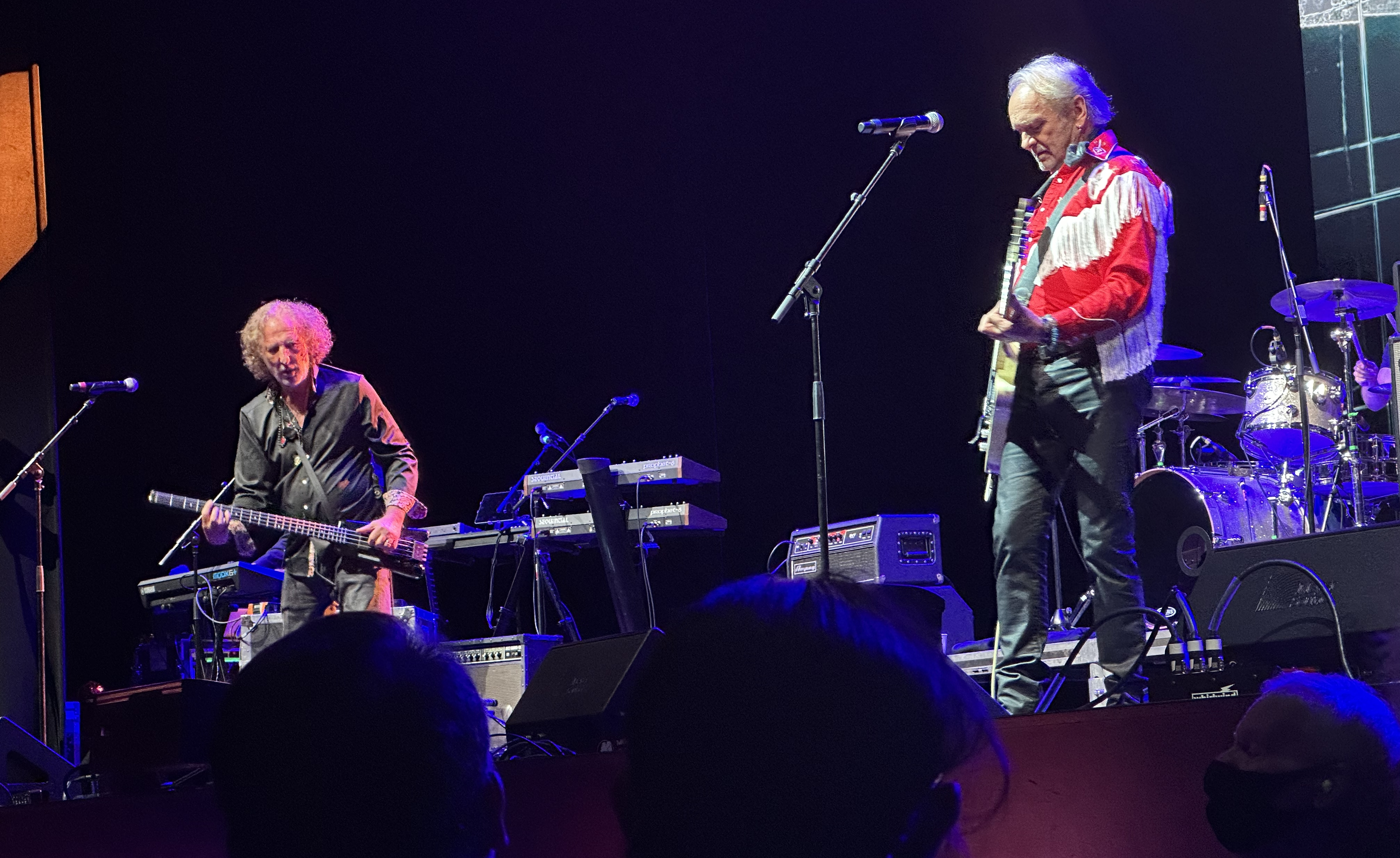
- Wang Chung in 2024; Nick Feldman (left), Jack Hues (right)

Background information
- Also known as: Huang Chung
- Origin: London, England
- Genres: New wave; pop rock; dance-rock; dance-pop
- Years active: 1977–1990; 1997–present
- Labels: Rewind; Arista; Geffen; A&M; Chong Music; Digitally Sound
- Members: Nick Feldman; Jack Hues
- Past members: Darren Costin; Dave Burnand
- Website: wangchung.com

Wang Chung are an English new wave band, formed in London in 1977 by Nick Feldman, Jack Hues and Darren Costin. The name Wang Chung is Chinese (黃鐘, pinyin: huáng zhōng; Wade–Giles: huang chung), meaning "yellow bell" in English, and is the first note in the Chinese classical music scale. The band found their greatest success in the US, with five top 40 hits there, all charting between 1983 and 1987, including "Dance Hall Days" (No. 16 in 1984), "Live And Die In LA" (No. 41 in 1985), "Everybody Have Fun Tonight" (No. 2 in 1986) and "Let's Go!" (No. 9 in 1987).

== Career ==
=== 1977–1979: Early years ===
Jeremy Ryder, known professionally as Jack Hues (lead vocals and guitar), and Nick Feldman (guitar) would eventually form the core of Wang Chung. They first met when Hues answered Feldman's advertisement for musicians in the classifieds section of the weekly British music magazine Melody Maker in 1977. They were joined by Bud Merrick on bass and Paul Hammond (ex-Atomic Rooster) on drums, forming the Intellektuals.

In less than a year, that band broke up. Hues and Feldman then joined up with future Wang Chung drummer Darren Costin, bassist Leigh Gorman, keyboardist Simon Campbell and vocalist Glenn Gregory, to form 57 Men. This band lasted for about eighteen months before breaking up. Gorman would go on to play bass in Adam and the Ants, Gregory went on to become the lead vocalist for Heaven 17, and Gorman later played in Bow Wow Wow.

Hues, Feldman and Costin stayed together and renamed themselves Huang Chung. According to Feldman, he came across the term "Huang Chung", meaning "yellow bell" in Mandarin, in a book he was reading, and used it as the name for the band.

=== 1980–1982: Huang Chung years ===
At the beginning of Huang Chung's career, all the members performed under pseudonyms. Jeremy Ryder was "Jack Hues" (a play on Emile Zola's 1898 open letter J'Accuse...!), Nick Feldman was "Nick DeSpig", and Darren Costin was "Darren Darwin" (and later, just "Darwin"). The band then signed to a label called 101 Records. The first Huang Chung release, "Baby I'm Hu-man", appeared on a 101 compilation album in 1980. Three live tracks were subsequently released on another 101 Records compilation in 1981.

Later in 1980, the independent record company Rewind Records signed the band for a two-single deal. Huang Chung's debut single for Rewind Records was "Isn't It About Time We Were on TV", followed by "Stand Still". Neither single charted, but the group had begun to attract the attention of Arista Records, who signed them on a two-album deal in early 1981. Around the same time, the group expanded to a quartet, with the addition of saxophonist Dave Burnand. In keeping with the all-pseudonymous nature of the band, Burnand was known as "Hogg Robinson" for the first Arista single, and later, simply as "Hogg".

Under the direction of producer Rhett Davies, Huang Chung issued two singles on Arista in 1981, neither of which charted. A third single, produced by Roger Bechirian, appeared in early 1982; it too failed to chart. The band's debut studio album was issued in 1982. Self-titled, it compiled the three non-charting Arista A-sides, one of the Arista B-sides, and six other new tracks. Like the associated singles, the Huang Chung album failed to chart.

At the time the band's self-titled album was issued, Hues, DeSpig and Burnand also contributed to the lone studio album by mysterious pseudonymous group Blanket of Secrecy. Hues and DeSpig wrote the song "Lovers" for the album, and Hues scored the strings for that song, while Burnand played saxophone on the album. Despite some speculation at the time, no member of Huang Chung was actually a member of Blanket of Secrecy — that band consisted of Roger Bechirian, Andrew Howell and Pete Marsh, operating under the pseudonyms Tinker, Soldier, and Tailor.

In late 1982, Huang Chung returned to the studio to start work on their second studio album for Arista Records. A new single, "Dance Hall Days", was produced by Tim Friese-Greene and appeared as both a 7" and 12" single in October, but did not chart. The band were still a quartet at this point, with Feldman dropping the assumed "De Spig" surname and billing himself simply as "Nick".

After the failure of "Dance Hall Days", the group's manager, David Massey, convinced Arista to close their contract with Huang Chung, and instead placed the band with American label Geffen Records, making the group the second UK-based act to be signed to Geffen worldwide after Asia (not counting then-New York-based John Lennon in 1980). Burnand left the group around this time, citing "musical differences". Burnand went on to a career in music education at the University of London and the Royal College of Music, while also composing music for the films of Andrew Kotting.

=== 1983–1985: Name change and initial success ===
Nick Feldman and Jack Hues, 1986

In 1983 they were still billed under the band name "Huang Chung" at BBC 2 music show The Old Grey Whistle Test.

At this juncture, according to Hues, the band changed the spelling of their name to Wang Chung, at Geffen's suggestion, to make the pronunciation easier for English speakers.

At the same time, Nick Feldman and Darren Costin opted to be billed under their real full names; only Jack Hues kept his pseudonym. The band spent most of 1983 recording their second studio album, Points on the Curve. Released in July 1983, the album yielded two moderately successful hits, "Don't Let Go" (No. 38 US) and a re-recorded version of "Dance Hall Days" (No. 16 US, No. 21 UK). The popularity of Dance Hall Days gave Wang Chung the ability to spend two months touring the United States on their own and with the Romantics and Berlin.

In 1984, they were the opening act for The Cars on their "Heartbeat City" tour. Costin left the band following this tour, and formed his own group, Heroes, which released the studio album Here We Are on RCA Records in 1987.

In late 1983, Hues and Feldman collaborated in a one-off project with vocalist David Van Day of duo Dollar. A demo of the track "Ringing the Bell" was submitted to Van Day by their publisher as one of many songs for consideration by Van Day as a possible follow up to his single "Young Americans Talking". It was recorded in November 1983 but remained unreleased for some time before eventually surfacing under the band name Music Academy in 1985. Wang Chung followed up the release of Points on the Curve with a spate of soundtrack work. Director William Friedkin specifically sought out Wang Chung to score his 1985 film To Live and Die in L.A.

The resulting soundtrack became the group's third studio album, and is recognizable as one of their more mainstream works. It went top ten on the US Billboard chart for soundtracks. The band recorded "Fire in the Twilight" for the 1985 John Hughes film The Breakfast Club and contributed "There Is a Nation" for the soundtrack to First Born. With Costin gone, Hues and Feldman continued to record new material, employing producer Peter Wolf as their new drummer (although he never became an official member of the band).

=== 1986–1989: US commercial peak ===
Wang Chung released their fourth studio album, Mosaic, in 1986. This album spun off their biggest hits: "Everybody Have Fun Tonight" (No. 2 US (Billboard) and No. 1 (Cashbox)) and "Let's Go!" (No. 9 US). "Everybody Have Fun Tonight" features the lyric "Everybody Wang Chung tonight", and also has a music video (directed by Godley & Creme) where virtually every frame featured a jump cut. During some US dates in the summer of 1987, they were the opening act for Tina Turner during her Break Every Rule World Tour.

Their final US top 40 single, "Hypnotize Me" (No. 36), was also from the same album, and also was featured on the soundtrack of the 1987 film Innerspace. Wang Chung released their fifth studio album, The Warmer Side of Cool, in 1989. The album featured "Praying to a New God" (No. 63 US), which charted but was not a hit. The album was considered a commercial disappointment. Hues and Feldman then went on to other projects and the band effectively disbanded in 1990.

=== 1990–1997: Hiatus ===
During the 1990s, Feldman joined up with drummer Jon Moss of Culture Club to form the band Promised Land, and subsequently released their self-titled debut studio album, Promised Land, in 1992. Also in the 1990s, Hues worked on various film soundtracks, including The Guardian (1990). He was signed to a solo deal by Sony Records in the early 1990s, but his intended debut solo studio album, The Anatomy Lesson, was shelved by the label and remains unreleased. Hues later teamed up with Tony Banks of Genesis to form the one-off group Strictly Inc., which released a self-titled studio album in 1995.

=== 1997–2016: Reformation ===
1997 saw the return of Wang Chung, still consisting of Hues and Feldman, with a greatest hits collection entitled Everybody Wang Chung Tonight: Wang Chung's Greatest Hits. Included on this CD was a new single, "Space Junk". The group also toured North America around this time to promote the new compilation. A 2000 edition of Wang Chung played several dates in the United States, both headlining their own tour and also a part of the Club 80s Flashback Tour with A Flock of Seagulls, Missing Persons, and Gene Loves Jezebel with Michael Aston. Hues was the only original member of this iteration of the band, as Feldman bowed out due to other commitments.

In March 2005, Wang Chung (once again consisting of Hues and Feldman) contributed "Akasha", a previously unreleased song, to the Of Hands and Hearts compilation, in response to the 2004 Southeast Asia tsunami crisis. In June 2005, Wang Chung appeared on the reality TV series Hit Me Baby One More Time, performing "Everybody Have Fun Tonight" and a cover version of "Hot in Herre" by Nelly.

Beginning in June 2009, Wang Chung were a part of the Regeneration '80s tour along with ABC, Berlin, Cutting Crew, and Missing Persons. In June 2010, Wang Chung released a digital "double EP" entitled Abducted by the 80s. This was subsequently released as a double CD set in mid-2011. The eight song collection included four re-recordings of previous hits, and four new songs. Wang Chung toured the United States from June to July 2010 to promote the new release.

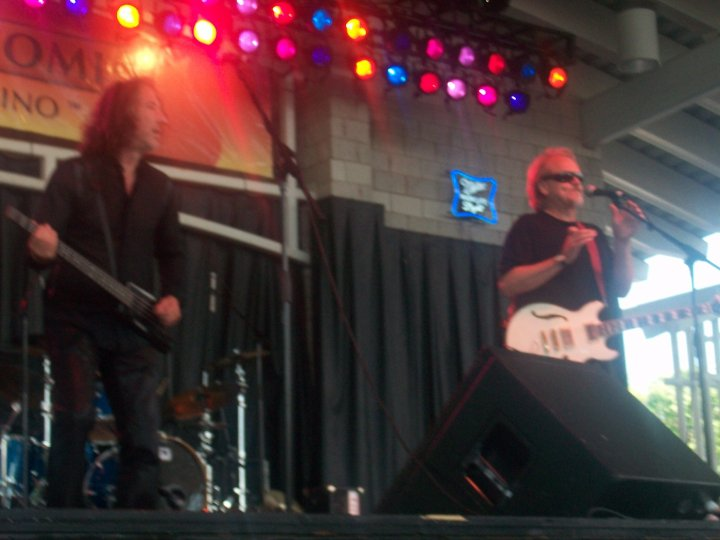
Wang Chung performing in 2010

On 21 September 2010, The Beatles Complete on Ukulele released Wang Chung's reworking of the Beatles' "Rain", in an arrangement which features the ukulele. On 31 October 2010 their song "Space Junk" was featured in the pilot episode of the AMC series The Walking Dead (and is also included on the episode "What Comes After"). The Fighter, a 2010 film starring Mark Wahlberg, featured Wang Chung's music.

They played the Rewind Festival in Perth in July 2012, and Henley-on-Thames in August 2012. In December that year, Wang Chung released Tazer Up!, their first studio album in 23 years. All four original tracks from Abducted by the 80s appear on Tazer Up! (some in remixed and/or edited form); the album also features a remix of the re-recorded Abducted version of "Dance Hall Days". The remaining 6 tracks are unique to this release. In 2013, Darren Costin rejoined Wang Chung for a special one-off performance in England.

=== 2016: Jack Hues on hiatus ===
In 2016, the band began to perform live with Gareth Moulton of Cutting Crew on lead vocals.

=== 2017–present ===
In 2017, Hues returned to performing live with Wang Chung, and in 2019, they recorded a greatest hits album with the Prague Philharmonic Orchestra titled Orchesography. Two EPs consisting of the orchestral versions and remixes were released of "Dance Hall Days" and "Everybody Have Fun Tonight" on both CD and digital download. Orchesography was released on 10 May 2019.

In 2024, Wang Chung headlined the Abducted by the 80's tour with 18 dates across the US and Canada with fellow 1980s acts Men Without Hats, The Motels, and Naked Eyes.

In March 2025, Wang Chung headlined 80's Mania festival tour across Australia which also included Katrina & The Waves' Katrina, The Escape Club (for their first Australian tour), Scott Carne from Kids In The Kitchen, Brian Mannix from Uncanny X Men, & The Chantoozies. In May the same year, they released a new retrospective 2 disc compilation album called "Clear Light / Dark Matter - Greatest Hits & Near Misses".

== Awards and nominations ==
Award	Year	Nominee(s)	Category	Result	Ref.
MTV Video Music Awards	1984	"Dance Hall Days"	Best New Artist	Nominated	

== Discography ==
Studio albums

- Huang Chung (1982)
- Points on the Curve (1984)
- To Live and Die in L.A. (1985)
- Mosaic (1986)
- The Warmer Side of Cool (1989)
- Tazer Up! (2012)
- Orchesography (2019)

Extended plays

- Abducted by the 80's (2010)

Compilation Albums

- Clear Light / Dark Matter (2025)
