= Dance Hall Days =

1982 single by Wang Chung

Single by Wang Chung

from the album Points on the Curve
- B-side: "Why Do You Laugh?" (1982); "There Is a Nation" (1984)
- Released: October 1982 (original); 30 December 1983 (re-recorded)
- Studio: Abbey Road (London) (re-recorded version)
- Genre: New wave; electropop
- Length: 3:58
- Label: Geffen
- Songwriters: Jack Hues; Nick Feldman; Darren Costin
- Producers: Wang Chung; Chris Hughes; Ross Cullum

Wang Chung singles chronology
"China" (1982)	"Dance Hall Days" (1982)	"Don't Let Go" (1984)

Audio sample
- "Dance Hall Days": file; help

"Dance Hall Days" is a song by the English new wave band Wang Chung. It was released as a single in 1982 when the band was called Huang Chung, and re-recorded and released in 1983 for their second studio album, Points on the Curve (1984).

It was the band's only single to enter the top 40 in the United Kingdom, peaking at No. 21. In the United States, it reached No. 16 on the Billboard Hot 100 and topped the Billboard Dance/Disco Top 80.

== Music videos ==
Two different music videos were made to promote the single. The first version of the video, directed by Derek Jarman, is a collection of home movies with the majority of the archive footage consisting of Billy Rose's Aquacade at the 1939 New York World’s Fair (a stage-and-water revue with swimmers and fountains), and other World War II-era material. The footage is courtesy of the director's father, who was one of the first people to use a colour home movie camera. The toddler in the home movie footage is the director himself as a child.

The home movies are interspersed amid footage of Jack, Nick, and Darren, lip-synching and playing the violin. The band are dressed up as characters from The Wizard of Oz at the end of the video, with Jack Hues as the Tin Man, Nick Feldman as the Scarecrow, and Darren Costin as the Cowardly Lion.

The second version of the video is a fantasy concept set in the 1940s, the heyday of dance halls. The video begins in black and white, with Jack Hues stopping in front of a closed-down hall, setting down the suitcase he carries, and picking up a flyer. The scene shifts to colour, featuring the band performing in the packed hall with the backing of a big band as couples dance.

Later, a disco ball descends to the floor and breaks open, allowing a mirror-covered dancer to emerge. The video ends in black and white, with Hues walking past the hall and down the street; he leaves his suitcase behind, but it sprouts legs and hurries off after him.

The second video was nominated for Best New Artist at the 1984 MTV Video Music Awards, losing to "Sweet Dreams (Are Made of This)" by Eurythmics.

== Track listings ==
7-inch Geffen / A3837 (UK) – 1984
No.	Title	Length
1.	"Dance Hall Days"	3:58
2.	"There Is a Nation"	3:37

12-inch Geffen / TA3837 (UK) – 1984
No.	Title	Length
1.	"Dance Hall Days (remix)"	8:02
2.	"There Is a Nation"	3:37

CD August Day / 042 (UK) – 2019
No.	Title	Length
1.	"Dance Hall Days (orchestral version)"	4:22
2.	"Dance Hall Days (Daniele Baldelli & DJ Rocca vocal remix)"	5:27
3.	"Dance Hall Days (Kim and Buran disco mix)"	6:13
4.	"Dance Hall Days (Psychemagik remix)"	4:01
5.	"Dance Hall Days (orcapella)"	4:05

== Charts ==
=== Weekly charts ===
Chart (1984)	Peak position
Australia (Kent Music Report)	7
Belgium (Ultratop 50 Flanders)	3
Canada Retail Singles (The Record)	6
Canada Top Singles (RPM)	9
Europe (European Hot 100 Singles)	17
France (IFOP)	25
Ireland (IRMA)	12
Italy (Musica e dischi)	2
Netherlands (Dutch Top 40)	9
Netherlands (Single Top 100)	10
New Zealand (Recorded Music NZ)	6
Sweden (Sverigetopplistan)	9
Switzerland (Schweizer Hitparade)	5
UK Singles (Official Charts)	21
US Billboard Hot 100	16
US Dance/Disco Top 80 (Billboard) with "Don't Let Go"	1
US Rock Top Tracks (Billboard)	24
US Cash Box	17
West Germany (GfK)	5

=== Year-end charts ===
Chart (1984)	Rank
Australia (Kent Music Report)	65
Belgium (Ultratop 50 Flanders)	53
Canada Top Singles (RPM)	65
Netherlands (Dutch Top 40)	85
US Billboard Hot 100	74
US Dance/Disco Club Play (Billboard)	22
West Germany (Media Control)	41

== Certifications ==
Region	Certification	Certified units/sales
Canada (Music Canada)	Gold	50,000^{^}
New Zealand (RMNZ)	Gold	15,000^{‡}
United Kingdom (BPI) 2004 release	Silver	200,000^{‡}
^{^} Shipments figures based on certification alone.^{‡} Sales+streaming figures based on certification alone.

== See also ==
- List of Billboard number-one dance singles of 1984
