= Jack Hues =

English musician (born 1954)

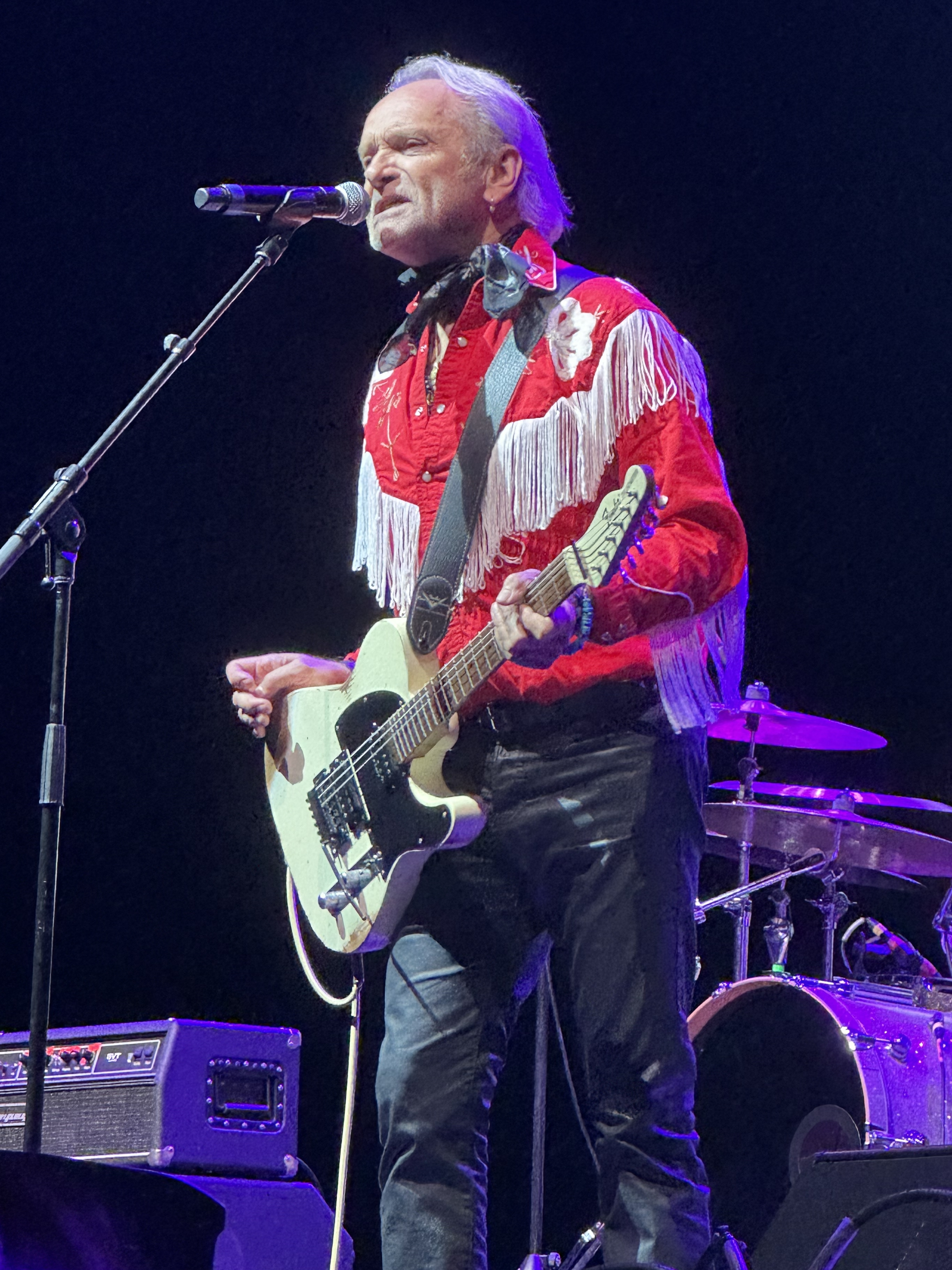
- Hues in 2024

Background information
- Born: Jeremy Allan Ryder; 10 December 1954 (age 71)
- Origin: Gillingham, Kent, England
- Genres: New wave; pop rock
- Occupations: Musician; singer; guitarist
- Instruments: Vocals; guitar; keyboards; piano
- Years active: 1977–present
- Labels: Rewind (1980); Arista (1981–1982); Geffen (1982–1991); Columbia (1991); Virgin (1994–1995)
- Member of: Wang Chung
- Formerly of: Strictly Inc.
- Website: jackhues.com

Jeremy Allan Ryder (born 10 December 1954), known professionally as Jack Hues, is an English singer, songwriter and musician who is best known for forming and fronting the 1980s English new wave band Wang Chung. Hues was also a member of the one-off band Strictly Inc.

== Life and career ==
=== Early life ===
Jack Hues was born on 10 December 1954 in Gillingham, Kent, England, the oldest of four children of Robina (née Pratt) and Allan Sidney Ryder. He was an avid listener to artists such as the Beatles and Jimi Hendrix before becoming interested in progressive rock groups like Yes and Genesis. Hues then found a passion in classical music, and attended London's Goldsmiths College to study music. After three years, he went on to attend the Royal College of Music. It was at this time that Hues befriended Dave Burnand, who went on to be a member of Huang Chung. After one year at RCM, he decided on leaving to pursue a career in music.

=== 1977–1991: Wang Chung era ===
In 1977 Hues answered an advertisement in the British weekly music magazine Melody Maker. This was the first time he met future Wang Chung bass guitarist Nick Feldman. With the rising punk music movement around England in the late 1970s, the two formed together as the Intellektuals in mid-1977. Two years later, Hues and Feldman formed the band 57 Men. While in 57 Men, the two met future Wang Chung drummer Darren Costin. Like their first band together, Hues and Feldman broke up within eighteen months, but took along Costin.

In late 1979 the threesome became referred to as Huang Chung (anglicization of Chinese words meaning "Yellow Bell"). They released several singles in 1980 for the independent music company Rewind Records. In May 1981 Huang Chung signed a recording contract with Arista Records for a two-album deal. The next year the band released their self-titled debut studio album. By 1983 the spelling of the band's name was changed to Wang Chung, and Hues became the band's lead vocalist. After the summer tour for Points on the Curve in 1984 Costin left the band to pursue a solo career. Despite not having a full-time drummer, Wang Chung continued to thrive. For the next six years, Wang Chung enjoyed success, especially in the UK and US.

=== 1991–1992: Solo work ===
Before Wang Chung's break-up in 1991 Hues scored the soundtrack of the supernatural horror film The Guardian (1990). The director of the film, William Friedkin, chose Hues because of his work on his 1985 film To Live and Die in L.A.. He also made a solo studio album, The Anatomy Lesson, in 1992 for Sony Records. However, for reasons unknown, his solo debut album was shelved.

=== 1994–1995: Strictly Inc. ===
In 1994 Tony Banks of Genesis heard samples of Hues' work. He admired it and asked him to compose a new album together. On 11 September 1995 Strictly Inc. was released. The studio album received mixed reviews.

=== 1997–2005: Wang Chung reunions ===
In 1997 Hues and Nick Feldman briefly reunited for the release of the compilation album Everybody Wang Chung Tonight: Wang Chung's Greatest Hits.

In 2000 Wang Chung performed in the Club 80's Flashback Tour and headlined a tour of their own afterwards. In 2005 Wang Chung appeared on the competition reality show Hit Me, Baby, One More Time to perform "Everybody Have Fun Tonight". They lost the round to Irene Cara.

=== 2003–2011: The Quartet ===
In the early 2000s, Hues began teaching songwriting at Christ Church University in Canterbury.

In 2003, Hues was one of the founding members of a jazz-influenced quintet with Sam Bailey called Illuminated. Their inspirations included Miles Davis, Johannes Brahms, and Aphex Twin. Eventually the quintet became The Quartet. Their debut studio album Illuminated was released in 2007 and their second Shattering in 2008 – both released to critical acclaim. The Quartet is signed with Helium Records, headed by Chris Hughes who helped produce Wang Chung's Points on the Curve in 1983. In 2010 the Quartet joined forces with Syd Arthur, a Canterbury psychedelic rock band whose members studied with Hues while at Christ Church University. Together the two groups played a medley of tracks from Soft Machine, a rearranged Stravinsky violin concerto, and the Beck song "Nobody's Fault but My Own" at the Orange Street Music Club. In 2012 both bands reunited inside a barn to record the Beck song, and in 2019 it was released on Bandcamp for purchase through digital download and vinyl.

In 2011, Hues wrote the music for his son Jack Ryder's first film Act of Memory.

=== 2020–present: Primitif ===
In March 2020, Hues released his debut solo studio album, Primitif. Before releasing the album, singles were produced for the songs "Whitstable Beach" and "Winter".

== Personal life ==
Ryder's stage name, "Jack Hues," is a play on the French phrase, j'accuse, which means "I accuse" in English. He has a daughter and two sons, one of whom is the actor Jack Ryder. In 2024, Hues married former dancer and makeup artist Lourdes Gauthier Daigrepont Lucas.

== Discography ==
Solo studio albums

- The Anatomy Lesson (Unreleased, 1992)
- Primitif (2020)
- Electro-Acoustic Works 2020 (2021)

Soundtrack albums

- The Guardian (1990)
- Act of Memory (2011)

Live albums

- Canterbury Live EP (2021)

with Wang Chung

- Huang Chung (1982)
- Points on the Curve (1983)
- To Live and Die in L.A. (1985)
- Mosaic (1986)
- The Warmer Side of Cool (1989)
- Tazer Up! (2012)
- Orchesography (2019)

with Strictly Inc.

- Strictly Inc. (1995)

with the Quartet

- Illuminated (2007)
- Shattering (2008)
- Nobody's Fault but My Own EP with Syd Arthur (2019)
