= Peter Wolf (producer) =

Austrian producer and songwriter

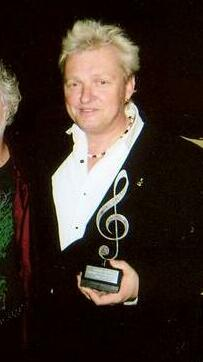
- Wolf at the 2008 Birmingham Area Music Awards

Background information
- Born: August 25, 1952 (age 74); Vienna, Austria
- Genres: Pop rock; classical
- Occupations: Musician; composer; record producer
- Instrument: Keyboards
- Years active: 1969–present

Peter F. Wolf (born August 25, 1952) is an Austrian composer, producer, songwriter, and arranger. In 2002, he was awarded the Austrian Cross of Honour for Science and Art, 1st class (Österreichische Ehrenkreuz für Wissenschaft und Kunst). Wolf was married to Christina Ganahl Wolf and Michelle Wolf. After Michelle divorced him, he married Lea Wolf-Millesi and lives in Malibu, California.

== Career ==
Wolf studied classical piano at the Conservatory of Music in Vienna. At the age of 16, he won the European Jazz Festival as a solo pianist. Twice he won the Deutscher Schallplattenpreis, a German award, for his work with André Heller and Erika Pluhar.

Wolf moved to America in his early twenties. He worked with bassist Neal Starkey and guitarist Bill Hatcher in Atlanta, Georgia, and with drummer Steve Sample Jr. and keyboardist, guitarist, and vocalist Ray Reach in Birmingham, Alabama. After his time in the southeastern United States, Wolf moved to Los Angeles, where he played keyboards for Frank Zappa in the late 1970s. In 1978, along with Terry Bozzio, he guested on the eponymous debut album by Mark Isham, Peter Maunu, and Patrick O'Hearn's band Group 87, released in 1980.

Wolf began producing in 1985, co-producing the Commodores' "Nightshift". He also produced the hit singles "We Built This City" and "Sara" for Starship, Wang Chung's "Everybody Have Fun Tonight", and El Debarge's "Who's Johnny", leading to more studio and production work.

After losing his home and home studio in the 1994 Northridge earthquake, Wolf relocated to Austria and founded a new studio, Little America.

Wolf composed music for the films: The NeverEnding Story III, Weekend at Bernie's II, The Hollywood Sign, and Nutcracker and Mouse King. His credits include Father's Day, Die Cellistin (The Cellist), Widows, St. Pauli Night, The Fearless Four, and Band on the Run. In 2011, he composed music for the Christmas movie When Santa Fell to Earth.

In July 2015, Wolf and Lea Wolf-Millesi started Whamslam, an online entertainment platform for children that combines creativity, music, and education.

== Awards ==
The Birmingham music scene honored Wolf with a BAMA Award (Birmingham Area Music Award) in 2008.

== Discography ==
- A Change in My Life/Kraft durch Freude (1969)
- Tutti (1980)
- Progression – A Symphony by Peter Wolf (2000)
- The Other Side (2003)
- Sense-ation – A Symphony by Peter Wolf (2004)

with Gipsy Love

- Gipsy Love (The White Album) (1970)
- Here We Come (1972)

with Frank Zappa

- Sheik Yerbouti (1979) (Single "Bobby Brown", Peter Wolf on Keyboards, Butter, Flora Margarine)
- Joe's Garage Act I (1979)
- Joe's Garage Acts II & III (1979)
- Tinsel Town Rebellion (1981)
- Shut Up 'n' Play Yer Guitar (1981)
- Chicago '78 (2016)

with Red Rider

- "Lunatic Fringe"/As Far as Siam (1981)

with Wolf & Wolf

- Culture Shocked/Think Pink (1982)
- Don't Take the Candy (1984)

with Grace Slick

- Software (1984)

with Sérgio Mendes

- Brasil '86 (1986)

with Vienna

- Guess What? (1987)

with Chicago

- Chicago XXXII: Stone of Sisyphus (1994/2008)

Arrangement and accompaniment

- Jefferson Starship - Nuclear Furniture / "No Way Out" (1984)
- Survivor - Vital Signs (1984)
- The Commodores - "Nightshift" (1985)
- Starship - "We Built This City" (1985)
- Maurice White - Maurice White (1985) (keyboards)
- Heart - "What About Love" (1985) (synth, piano & creative input)
- Starship - "Sara" (1986)
- Wang Chung - "Everybody Have Fun Tonight" (1986) (also performed drums)
- Heart - "These Dreams" (1986)
- El DeBarge - "Who's Johnny" (main theme of the film Short Circuit) (1986)
- Patti LaBelle - "On My Own" (1986)
- Chris Sutton - Chris Sutton (1986)
- Kenny Loggins - "Playing with the Boys" (from the films Top Gun and Side Out) (1986)
- Wang Chung - "Let's Go!" (1987) (also performed drums)
- Big Country - Peace in Our Time (1988)
- Kenny Loggins - Back to Avalon (1988)
- Nik Kershaw - The Works (1989)
- Lou Gramm - Long Hard Look (1989) (producer, keyboards)
- Go West - "King of Wishful Thinking" (from the film Pretty Woman) (1990)
- Laura Branigan - Laura Branigan (1990) (producer, keyboards, keyboard bass, percussion, arrangements)
- Bryan Duncan - Anonymous Confessions of A Lunatic Friend (1990) (keyboards)
- The Escape Club - "I'll Be There" (1991)
- Starship - "Good Heart" (1991)
- Indecent Obsession - "Kiss Me" (1992)
- The Pointer Sisters - "Only Sisters Can Do That" (1993) (Producer)
- Go West - "Faithful" (1992) No. 14 US, No. 13 UK
- 4Him - "Love Finds You", "Between You And Me", "Wings" from Ride of Life (1994) (producer, keyboards, bass, piano, percussion, arrangements)
- Bryan Duncan - "Traces of Heaven, "Your Love, My Saving Grace", "Things Are Gonna Change" from Slow Revival (1994) (keyboards and arrangements)
- Bryan Duncan - Mercy (1992) (keyboards and track arrangements)
- 4Him ("Sacred Hideaway" from The Message, 1996) (producer, keyboards, arrangements)
- Cliff Richard - "Can't Keep this Feeling In" and album Real As I Wanna Be (1998) (producer)
- Chicago - Chicago XXXII: Stone of Sisyphus (2008) (producer, arrangements, keyboards, keyboard bass)
- Scorpions - Eye II Eye (1999) (producer, piano, keyboards)
