= Nick Feldman =

English musician (born 1955)

The Honourable Nick Feldman
- Also known as: Nick de Spig
- Born: Nicholas Laurence Feldman; 1 May 1955 (age 71)
- Origin: North London, England
- Genres: Rock; pop; pop rock; dance; new wave
- Occupations: Musician; singer; composer; manager; publisher; investor; audition judge; talent scout for The Voice
- Instruments: Bass guitar; guitar; keyboards; vocals
- Years active: 1977–present
- Labels: Rewind; Arista; Geffen; Epic; Sony
- Member of: Wang Chung
- Formerly of: Promised Land
- Website: wangchung.com

Nicholas Laurence Feldman (born 1 May 1955) is an English musician best known for forming the British new wave band Wang Chung in 1980. Feldman was half of the duo Promised Land, which also featured Jon Moss of Culture Club. He was a founding investor in Interactive Ideas and has worked for Warner Brothers, Sony Music and SonyBMG.

== Biography ==
Feldman was raised Jewish. He attended Highgate School and the University of Liverpool, originally studying psychology; however, his interest in the subject waned before graduation. After leaving the university he joined DJM Live Music Agency, signing Adam and the Ants. Before university, Feldman was involved in music. He left DJM to become a musician and form a band. Feldman has a younger brother, Steven, and a sister, Alexandra (a logo designer who designed the album art for Huang Chung). His father was Basil Feldman, Baron Feldman, a Conservative member of the House of Lords, and his aunt was the actress Fenella Fielding.

== Wang Chung era (1977–1991) ==
Bassist-keyboardist Feldman formed a band in the mid-1970s. He placed a help-wanted advertisement in the weekly British music magazine Melody Maker for additional band members. Singer and guitarist Jeremy Ryder (known professionally as Jack Hues) answered Feldman's ad. Feldman and Hues would eventually form the core duo of Wang Chung. Mike Berry (an American bassist and songwriter) also answered the ad. Mike Smith (a keyboardist friend of Feldman) and drummer Paul Hammond were already members of the band. Hammond had already enjoyed some success in the 1970s band Atomic Rooster. Smith soon left after being signed as a songwriter by Chinn and Chapman. After a year and a half, Berry left the band, going solo as Michael Hamilton Berry. In less than a year, the band split up.

With the rising punk music movement in Britain in the late 1970s, Feldman and Hues formed the Intellektuals in mid-1977. Two years later, Feldman and Hues formed 57 Men with future Wang Chung drummer Darren Costin, bassist Leigh Gorman, keyboardist Simon Campbell and vocalist Glenn Gregory. The band broke up 18 months later, but Feldman, Hues, and Costin remained together and in late 1979 became known as Huang Chung. At this time, Feldman was known professionally as Nick De Spig.

Huang Chung released two singles in 1980 for independent music company Rewind Records. In May 1981, the band signed a two-album agreement with Arista Records, releasing its self-titled debut album the following year. That year (still as Nick De Spig), Feldman co-wrote one track of the album Walls Have Ears by Blanket of Secrecy.

In 1983, Huang Chung signed with Geffen Records in the U.S. They wanted to change their name from Huang Chung to something more understandable; Geffen insisted that they keep the name, only changing the spelling to Wang Chung. Feldman returned to his real name professionally. After a summer tour for their first Geffen album (Points on the Curve) in 1984, Costin left the band to pursue a solo career. Without a full-time drummer, Wang Chung continued recording, releasing singles (including "Dance Hall Days" and "Everybody Have Fun Tonight" which reached No. 2 on the Billboard chart in 1986), four gold and platinum albums and touring extensively. In addition to writing and producing for Wang Chung, Feldman scored the William Friedkin film To Live and Die in L.A., and wrote and performed for John Hughes' The Breakfast Club.

== Post-Wang Chung era ==
The band quietly broke up in 1990. Shortly afterward, Feldman joined Jon Moss of Culture Club to form Promised Land. They released a cover version of Thunderclap Newman's "Something in the Air", which was the New Musical Express Single of the Week upon its release. Promised Land was signed by Pete Tong's FFRR label, recording their self-titled debut album for Epic Records in the U.S. Within two years the band broke-up and Feldman became a founding investor in a multimedia software distribution company, Interactive Ideas.

After scoring a number of film and TV projects, Feldman became A&R manager for Warner Music UK Limited.

In 1997, (whilst still working for Warner Bros) Feldman and Hues briefly reunited for the release of their first greatest-hits album on Geffen Records, recording a new track ("Space Junk") as a bonus track. Feldman worked at Warner Bros until 2001, when he became head of A&R at Sony Europe for five years.

In 2005, Wang Chung appeared on Hit Me Baby One More Time on ABC in the U.S., performing "Everybody Have Fun Tonight" and "Hot in Herre" by Nelly. Wang Chung reformed, working on a new album whilst Feldman still worked at Sony. He left Sony to concentrate on finishing the Wang Chung album and to expand into artist management.

Wang Chung has toured the U.S. four times from June 2009 to September 2010 and planned to release their album, Tazer Up!, in conjunction with another tour. In 2011–2012 Feldman judged auditions and talent-scouted for the BBC One show, The Voice.
