= Welcome to the Garden Party =

"Welcome to the ‚Garden Party‘"

Single by Marillion

from the album Script for a Jester's Tear
- A-side: "Garden Party" (7")
- B-side: "Market Square Heroes" (7"); "Script for A Jester's Tear" (live) / "Kayleigh" (live) (12")
- Released: July 1986
- Recorded: 1983, 1984, 1986
- Genre: Neo-prog
- Label: EMI Electrola
- Songwriter(s): Fish, Steve Rothery, Pete Trewavas, Mick Pointer, Mark Kelly
- Producer(s): Nick Tauber (7"); Marillion and Simon Hanhart (12" A-side) / Marillion and Mark Freegard (12" B-side)

Marillion singles chronology
"Lady Nina" (1986)	"Welcome to the ‚Garden Party‘" (1986)	"Incommunicado" (1987)

"Welcome to the ‚Garden Party‘" (Note: sic—German-style quotation marks (opening marks on bottom line)) is a 1986 single by British neo-prog band Marillion released exclusively in West Germany to accompany a series of concerts the band played at festivals in that country as second bill to Queen, following their commercial breakthrough with the album Misplaced Childhood and the hit singles "Kayleigh" and "Lavender" the year before. The single was released on 7" and 12" vinyl; neither version contained any new or previously unreleased material. The 7" and 12" versions contained completely different recordings from each other. The A-side, "Garden Party", originally the second single from the band's debut album, Script for a Jester's Tear, had reached #16 on the UK Singles Chart in 1983, but—like all Marillion singles before "Kayleigh"—had failed to chart in Germany. However, the single received little airplay and failed to enter the German top 100.

While the 7" single contained the edited studio version of "Garden Party" also found on the original 1983 7" single (on which the line I'm fucking was replaced with I'm miming to avoid airplay problems), the A-side of the 12" single featured a live recording made at De Montfort Hall, Leicester, on 5 March 1984, previously released on the 1984 live album Real to Reel (on which the aforementioned line is sung by the audience). The B-side of the 7" single was the edited version of the 1984 re-recording of "Market Square Heroes" (originally the band's 1982 non-album debut single) first released on B-side of the 1984 7" single Punch & Judy. In its place, the B-side of the 12" single featured the two live tracks "Kayleigh" and "Script for a Jester's Tear". These versions, recorded at London's Hammersmith Odeon in January 1986, are the same as on Brief Encounter, an EP released only in the USA a few months earlier. Accordingly, the title printed on the 12" version was "Welcome to the ‚Garden Party‘ (LIVE)".

The cover was, as usual, designed by Mark Wilkinson and features artwork based on promotional material for the band's series of open-air concerts in the summer of 1986. As the band did not release any new material domestically in year following their commercial breakthrough, both this single and Brief Encounter were in demand by fans in the UK and thus widely stocked by record shops as imports. Today it is a sought-after collector's item.

Having been released in Germany only, "Welcome to the Garden Party" was not part of the collectors box-set released in July 2000 and was re-issued as a 3-CD set in 2009 (see The Singles '82–'88); however, both tracks of the 7" single are included as they featured on the singles "Garden Party" and "Punch and Judy".

== Track listing ==
=== 7" version ===
==== Side A ====
1. "Garden Party" (edited version)—4:29 (Dick/Rothery/Kelly/Trewavas/Pointer)

==== Side B ====
1. "Market Square Heroes"(edited re-recorded version)—03:58 (Dick/Rothery/Kelly/Trewavas/Pointer)

=== 12" version ===
==== Side A ====
1. "Garden Party" (live)—6:56 (Dick/Rothery/Kelly/Trewavas/Pointer)

==== Side B ====
1. "Kayleigh" (live version)—4:10 (Dick/Rothery/Kelly/Trewavas/Mosley)
2. "Script for A Jester's Tear" (live)—8:50 (Dick/Rothery/Kelly/Trewavas/Pointer)

== Personnel ==
- Fish – vocals
- Steve Rothery - guitars
- Mark Kelly - keyboards
- Pete Trewavas - bass, backing vocals
- Ian Mosley - drums on "Garden Party" (live) / "Kayleigh" / "Script for A Jester's Tear"
- Mick Pointer - drums on "Garden Party" (edited version)
- John Marter - drums on "Market Square Heroes"
