= B'Sides Themselves =

1988 compilation album by Marillion

- Cover art by Mark Wilkinson

Compilation album by Marillion
- Released: 4 January 1988 (CD); June 1988 (vinyl LP, cassette)
- Recorded: 1982–1987
- Genre: Neo-prog
- Length: 59:42
- Label: EMI
- Producer: Chris Kimsey, Nick Tauber, Simon Hanhart/Marillion

Marillion chronology
Clutching at Straws (1987)	B'Sides Themselves (1988)	The Thieving Magpie (1988)

Professional ratings
Review scores
Source	Rating
Allmusic	2.5/5 stars

B'Sides Themselves is a compilation of single B-sides by the British neo-prog band Marillion, which was released on CD only in January 1988. This was the first time that those B-sides were made available in the then still relatively new Compact Disc format (with the exception of "Tux On", which had featured on a limited edition CD single of "Sugar Mice" that was only sold at concerts). However, vinyl LP and cassette versions were issued in June 1988.

The compilation includes "Market Square Heroes", originally the A-side track for Marillion's 1982 debut single release, but here is included because it was re-recorded for the B-side of "Punch and Judy" (1984). "Three Boats Down From The Candy" was originally the B-side of "Market Square Heroes", but the version on this album is the re-recorded B-side of "Punch and Judy".

Also included is the 17-minute epic "Grendel", originally a B-side on the 12" version of the 1982 A-side "Market Square Heroes" single.

B'Sides Themselves would turn out to be the last Marillion record to be released while singer Fish, who left in October 1988, was still in the band.

== Cover art ==
The cover artwork was created by permanent contributor Mark Wilkinson. It is a collage combining fragments of front and back-cover artwork from previous singles:

- The spades-shaped head of the central is taken from the back cover of "Assassing", a reference to that single's b-side "Cinderella Search",
- The blue-lipped mouth is from the front cover of the single "He Knows You Know" (which had no back cover illustration), in reference to its b-side "Charting the Single",
- The suit and tie refer to "Tux On", the b-side of the single "Sugar Mice", which had a similar back cover illustration,
- The fragments on the left of the face are from the front cover of the singles "Market Square Heroes" (both the a-side and the 7" b-side "Three Boats Down From the Candy" are included on this compilation), the back covers of "Kayleigh" and "Incommunicado"; the fragments on the right side are from "Incommunicado", "Kayleigh" and The Video EP (featuring "Grendel" – the fragment shows the "Grendel" mask Fish wore on stage).

== Track listing ==
All tracks are written by Marillion

Side one
No.	Title	Original release	Length
1.	"Grendel"	"Market Square Heroes" 12" single, 1982	17:15
2.	"Charting the Single"	"He Knows You Know" single, 1983	4:48
3.	"Market Square Heroes" (Edited re-recording)	"Punch and Judy" single, 1984	3:56
4.	"Three Boats Down from the Candy" (Re-recording)	"Punch and Judy" single, 1984	4:01

Side two
No.	Title	Original release	Length
1.	"Cinderella Search" (Edited version)	"Assassing" single, 1984	4:21
2.	"Lady Nina"	"Kayleigh" single, 1985	3:43
3.	"Freaks"	"Lavender" single, 1985	4:04
4.	"Tux On"	"Sugar Mice" single, 1987	5:12
5.	"Margaret" (Live at the Edinburgh Playhouse, 7 April 1983)	"Garden Party" 12" single, 1983	12:17
Total length:			59:42

== Missing tracks and variations ==
Not all the B-sides of the singles that had been released at that point were included. Missing are "Chelsea Monday" from "Heart of Lothian" (1985), as well as "White Russian" and "Incommunicado" from "Warm Wet Circles" (1987), as these were live versions of album tracks.

The B-side of "Incommunicado" (1987), "Going Under" is also not included, despite having a different mix (it contains an extra piece of lead guitar) than the one contained on the original Clutching at Straws CD. The version of "Going Under" from the B-side of "Incommunicado" did eventually appear on the bonus disc of the 1999 remastered edition of Clutching at Straws.

"Cinderella Search" also differs between the CD and vinyl releases – the CD edition contains the short 7" version, while the vinyl edition contains the full-length 12" single version.

== Personnel ==
- Fish – vocals
- Steve Rothery – guitars
- Mark Kelly – keyboards
- Pete Trewavas – bass, backing vocals
- Mick Pointer – drums on tracks 1, 2, 9
- John Marter (credited as "John Martyr") – drums on tracks 3, 4
- Ian Mosley – drums on tracks 5, 6, 7, 8

== Charts ==
Album

Year	Chart	Position
1988	UK Album Chart	64
