= Brief Encounter (album) =

EP by Marillion
- Released: June 1986; June 1997 (two-disc repackage with Real to Reel)
- Recorded: Hansa Tonstudio, West Berlin, March – May 1985; Hammersmith Odeon, London, 9–10 January 1986
- Genre: Neo-prog
- Length: 30:16
- Label: Capitol
- Producer: Chris Kimsey, Mark Freegard

Marillion chronology
| Misplaced Childhood (1985) | Brief Encounter (1986) | Clutching at Straws (1987) |

Singles from Brief Encounter
- 1. "Lady Nina" Released: April 1986

Brief Encounter is a compilation EP by the British neo-prog band Marillion. EMI's American label Capitol Records released it there in 1986, coinciding with the band's tour. It contains two studio and three live tracks.

== Overview ==
Marillion were Rush's support act on the Power Windows tour and also played headline gigs at smaller theatres. The "mini album" contained five tracks: a live performance of the band's European breakthrough single "Kayleigh" (which had also entered the lower reaches of the Billboard Hot 100); the studio version of its b-side "Lady Nina"; the studio track "Freaks", released in Europe as the b-side of the follow-up single "Lavender"; and live recordings of the first two albums' title tracks, Fugazi (1984) and Script for a Jester's Tear (1983).

"Lady Nina" was also released as a single with a promo video on the U.S. market, with "Heart of Lothian", the third European single from Misplaced Childhood (1985), on the flip side, but failed to chart.

The title of the album is identical with that of a subsection of the track "Bitter Suite" on Misplaced Childhood, which alludes to the 1945 British film of the same title. Neither "Bitter Suite" nor its subsection "Brief Encounter" are found on this record. Brief Encounter was Marillion's only commercial release not to feature cover art by Mark Wilkinson prior to his and Fish's departure from the band in late 1988.

Although aimed strictly at the American market and not officially released elsewhere, this EP was very much in demand in Europe because Marillion's major breakthrough had just happened the previous year and the band not releasing any new material in 1986, which was their first "gap year" in terms of studio albums. Brief Encounter also included two non-album tracks. As a result, the EP was widely available as an import in record shops in the UK and mainland Europe in the late 1980s. Brief Encounter was released on vinyl and cassette only, and was not available on CD until 1997, when EMI re-released it worldwide in a two-disc set together with the 1984 live album Real to Reel. At the same time, EMI also released a series of remastered 2-disc editions of Marillion's EMI years studio albums; although not being officially part of that series, the Real to Reel/Brief Encounter set was digitally remastered at Abbey Road Studios by Brian Fifield.

According to the EP itself, all live tracks were recorded at "Hammersmith Odeon, 9 and 10 January 1986". This information may be inaccurate, as Fish can be heard saying "Leicester, goodnight" at the end of "Fugazi". Instead, "Script" and "Fugazi" were probably recorded during the concert at Leicester De Montfort Hall on 5 March 1984, parts of which also feature on Real to Reel. The live version of "Kayleigh" is identical to the one on The Thieving Magpie.

== Track listing ==
All tracks are written by Marillion.

Side one
| No. | Title | Length |
|---|---|---|
| 1. | "Lady Nina" | 5:45 |
| 2. | "Freaks" | 4:05 |
| 3. | "Kayleigh [live]" | 3:52 |

Side two
| No. | Title | Length |
|---|---|---|
| 1. | "Fugazi [live]" | 8:14 |
| 2. | "Script For a Jester's Tear [live]" | 8:20 |

1: Produced by Chris Kimsey for Wonderknob Ltd.,
2: Produced by Chris Kimsey for Chris Kimsey Productions Ltd.,
3–5: Produced and Engineered by Mark Freegard.

Note: Times taken from the 1986 vinyl version.

== Personnel ==
- Fish – vocals
- Steve Rothery – guitars
- Mark Kelly – keyboards
- Pete Trewavas – bass, backing vocals
- Ian Mosley – drums
