= Versão Acústica (album) =

Studio album by Emmerson Nogueira
- Released: December 21, 2001
- Recorded: September 2001
- Genre: Acoustic rock
- Length: 1:13:00
- Label: Columbia
- Producer: Emmerson Nogueira

Emmerson Nogueira studio albums chronology
Versão Acústica (2001)	Versão Acústica 2 (2002)

Versão Acústica is the debut album by Brazilian Acoustic rock musician Emmerson Nogueira, released on December 21, 2001, by Columbia. It features covers of hits by many famous international bands and musicians.

== Track listing ==
No.	Title	Original recording	Length
1.	"Listen to the Music"	The Doobie Brothers	3:31
2.	"Show Me the Way"	Peter Frampton	3:45
3.	"Hotel California"	Eagles	5:12
4.	"Wish You Were Here"	Pink Floyd	3:56
5.	"Emotion"	Samantha Sang	4:12
6.	"Forever Young"	Alphaville	2:55
7.	"Roxanne"	The Police	3:24
8.	"Kayleigh"	Marillion	3:48
9.	"Owner of a Lonely Heart"	Yes	3:59
10.	"Smoke on the Water"	Deep Purple	3:53
11.	"I Want to Break Free"	Queen	3:24
12.	"Dust in the Wind"	Kansas	2:39
13.	"Tears in Heaven"	Eric Clapton	4:21
14.	"Every Breath You Take"	The Police	3:27
15.	"A Horse with No Name"	America	3:48
16.	"Mrs. Robinson"	Simon & Garfunkel	3:54
17.	"Have You Ever Seen the Rain?"	Creedence Clearwater Revival	2:40
18.	"Holding Back the Years"	Simply Red	4:12
19.	"Unchain My Heart"	Ray Charles	2:58
20.	"Give a Little Bit"	Supertramp	3:26
Total length:			1:13:00
