= Ao Vivo (2007 Emmerson Nogueira album) =

Live album by Emmerson Nogueira
- Released: 2007
- Recorded: January 24, 2007
- Venues: Moinho Eventos, São Paulo, Brazil
- Genre: Acoustic rock
- Length: 54:35
- Label: Sony BMG
- Director: Santiago Ferraz
- Producer: Emmerson Nogueira

Emmerson Nogueira live album chronology
| Ao Vivo (2003) | Ao Vivo (2007) | Ao Vivo Vol. 2 (2010) |

Ao Vivo is the second live album and the first DVD by Brazilian Acoustic rock musician Emmerson Nogueira, released in 2007 by Sony BMG. Was recorded on January 24, 2007, at Moinho Eventos, São Paulo.

== Track listing ==
CD
| # | Title | Length | Original recording |
|---|---|---|---|
| 1 | It's Raining Again | 4:30 | Supertramp |
| 2 | Mrs. Robinson | 4:20 | Simon & Garfunkel |
| 3 | The Logical Song | 3:17 | Supertramp |
| 4 | Rosanna | 3:40 | Toto |
| 5 | A Horse with No Name/Ventura Highway | 4:38 | America |
| 6 | Tears in Heaven | 4:10 | Eric Clapton |
| 7 | Sailing | 4:13 | Christopher Cross |
| 8 | Wish You Were Here/Breathe (In the Air) | 4:28 | Pink Floyd |
| 9 | Money | 3:06 | Pink Floyd |
| 10 | Have You Ever Seen the Rain? | 2:30 | Creedence Clearwater Revival |
| 11 | Every Breath You Take | 5:11 | The Police |
| 12 | Give a Little Bit | 3:32 | Supertramp |
| 13 | Instrumental Viola | 3:05 | |
| 14 | Blowin' in the Wind | 3:38 | Bob Dylan |

DVD
| # | Title | Original recording |
|---|---|---|
| 1 | It's Raining Again | Supertramp |
| 2 | Emotion | Samantha Sang |
| 3 | Rosanna | Toto |
| 4 | The Logical Song | Supertramp |
| 5 | Roxanne | The Police |
| 6 | Money | Pink Floyd |
| 7 | Listen to the Music | The Doobie Brothers |
| 8 | Mrs. Robinson | Simon & Garfunkel |
| 9 | A Horse with No Name/Ventura Highway | America |
| 10 | Tears in Heaven | Eric Clapton |
| 11 | Sailing | Christopher Cross |
| 12 | Kayleigh | Marillion |
| 13 | Follow You Follow Me | Genesis |
| 14 | Instrumental Vocal | |
| 15 | Wish You Were Here/Breathe (In the Air) | Pink Floyd |
| 16 | I Still Haven't Found What I'm Looking For | U2 |
| 17 | Give a Little Bit | Supertramp |
| 18 | Instrumental Viola | |
| 19 | Have You Ever Seen the Rain? | Creedence Clearwater Revival |
| 20 | Every Breath You Take | The Police |
| 21 | Blowin' in the Wind | Bob Dylan |
| 22 | I Want to Break Free | Queen |
| 23 | Final (Instrumental) | |
