= Leicester Comedy Festival =

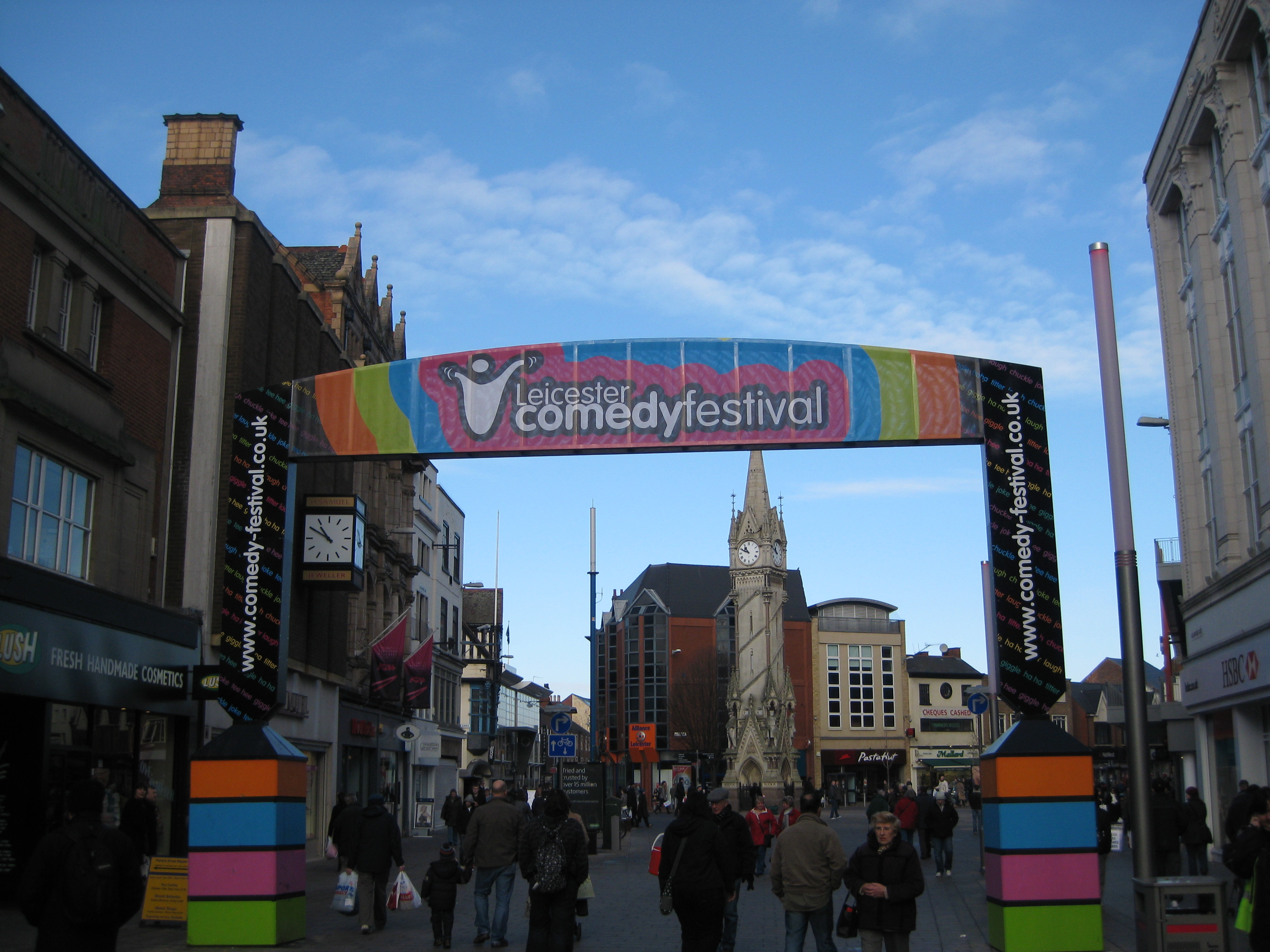
Promotional banner showing the Comedy Festival's logo

The Leicester Comedy Festival was an annual comedy festival held in a number of venues across Leicester, England early in the year since 1994. In 2026 due to financial problems the festival was cancelled.

== History ==
In the early 1990s, De Montfort University arts administration student, Geoff Rowe proposed a project to his lecturers to set up and run a comedy festival for Leicester. Rowe called Tony Slattery, Harry Hill and Matt Lucas for the inaugural Leicester Comedy Festival in 1994, with 40 events at 23 venues for 5,000 tickets. In 1995, the first Leicester Mercury Comedian of the Year Award was given to Stevie Knuckles, the best young comedian, later awarded to Johnny Vegas, Jason Manford, Josh Widdicombe and Romesh Ranganathan. Leicester Comedy Fringe events occur in Loughborough, Lutterworth, Foxton, and Coalville. Leicester Comedy Festival is Europe's largest and longest-running comedy festival with 560 shows at 64 venues. Rowe founded Leicester Comedy Festival with The Big Difference Company, as a charity, providing opportunities for young people to "learn about comedy, address health inequalities and improve people’s well-being", launching The Big Difference venue for up and coming comedy in Leicester.

Eshaan Akbar, Jo Brand, Sikisa and Stewart Lee, are now Patrons of The Leicester Comedy Festival, joining Tony Slattery.

The festival attracts over 60,000 people from all over the world and is seen as one of the 'Top 5 comedy festivals in the world'.

Since then many top stand-up comedians have performed in the festival including Jo Brand, Jack Dee, Dave Gorman, Rory Bremner, Simon Pegg, Alan Davies, Bill Bailey, The Mighty Boosh, Johnny Vegas, Rich Hall, Jimmy Carr, Dara Ó Briain, Russell Howard, Dave Spikey, Harry Hill, Greg Davies, Sarah Millican and Romesh Ranganathan. The main programme is also complemented by workshops and outdoor street events to encourage the development of comedy skills. Every year towards the end of the Festival the Leicester Mercury Comedian of the Year is announced.

To begin with, the festival lasted for just seven days. In 2010 the duration increased from 10 days to 17 days, then in 2015 it was increased to 19 days.

== Festival statistics ==
Year	Shows	Performers	Venues
1994	40		23
2011	370		50
2012	410		50
2013	530		50
2014	627		
2015	630		47
2016	780		65
2017	800		62
2018	847	613	69
2019	870		72
2020	?		?
2021	?		0
2022	560+		64
2023	?		?

The 2021 festival, staged during the COVID-19 pandemic, took place online.

== UK Pun Championship ==
2014 saw the inaugural UK Pun Championships, at the festival, hosted by Lee Nelson. The winner was Darren Walsh. The competition included the line "My computer's got a Miley Virus. It's stopped twerking."

In 2015, Leo Kearse beat off competition from fellow comedians Rob Thomas and reigning champion Darren Walsh to become the UK Pun Champion. Leo won the contest with such jokes as "I was in hospital last week. I asked the nurse if I could do my own stitches. She said “suture self” and "Growing up on a farm, my dad was always telling me to use the indoor toilet. But I preferred to go against the grain"

2016 saw the return of the UK Pun Championships hosted again by Lee Nelson. This year the winner was West Midlands comedian Masai Graham, with jokes such as "What's the difference between a hippo and a zippo? One's really heavy and the other is a little lighter" and "I love playing PGA Golf, but to say I have a weak shot on the greens would be putting it mildly"

The 2017 UK Pun Championships saw a new location in De Montfort Hall and host in Jason Byrne. It also saw the introduction of a new layout for the show, with the "Pun Off's" taking place within a boxing ring that had been constructed within the centre of the stalls. Lovdev Barpaga a.k.a. "The 'Pun'jabi Warrior'" won against Julian Lee in the final. Lovdevs jokes included "Pakistani Pirates. Urdu they think they argh?" and "I think my Colombian neighbour's a drug lord, but I just car tell."

The 2018 UK Pun Championships returned to De Montfort Hall in the boxing ring with host Jason Byrne on 13 February. After being beaten in the 2015 by Leo Kearse, Rob Thomas returned and beat 2nd time finalist Julian Lee to the title. Rob Thomas' puns included: "When Leicester won the league, my mum bought a candle to celebrate. Now it just languishes in the middle of the table" and "Brexit. It's like a catheter for Britain. We're no longer in continent."

== See also ==
- Comedy in the Dark
- Little Theatre (Leicester)
