= Clutching at Straws =

1987 studio album by Marillion

- Cover art by Mark Wilkinson

Studio album by Marillion
- Released: 12 June 1987
- Studios: Westside Studios, London
- Genre: Neo-prog
- Length: 49:25 (LP); 52:12 (CD)
- Label: EMI
- Producer: Chris Kimsey

Marillion chronology
Brief Encounter (1986)	Clutching at Straws (1987)	B'Sides Themselves (1988)

Singles from Clutching at Straws
- 1. "Incommunicado" Released: 11 May 1987; 2. "Sugar Mice" Released: 13 July 1987; 3. "Warm Wet Circles" Released: 26 October 1987

Clutching at Straws is the fourth studio album by the British neo-prog band Marillion, released on 12 June 1987. A concept album, it was the last to feature lead singer Fish, who left the band in 1988.

Clutching at Straws did not achieve the sales of its predecessor, the number one album Misplaced Childhood and spent only 15 weeks on the UK album chart, the shortest chart residency of any of Marillion's first four studio albums. However, it was still an immediate commercial success, becoming became the second highest charting Marillion album by entering the chart at number two. It produced three UK Top 40 singles: "Incommunicado", "Sugar Mice" and "Warm Wet Circles".

The album has received critical acclaim, being listed in Q magazine's "50 Best Recordings of the Year", it has been described by AllMusic as an "unheralded masterpiece", and Rolling Stone placed it at number 37 in its countdown of the "50 Greatest Prog Rock Albums of All Time". Prog Magazine rated it No. 47 on their "100 Greatest Prog Albums of all Time." In 1999, a 2-CD 'Remastered Version' with additional B-sides and demos was released, including detailed liner notes from all of the original members including Fish.

== Concept ==
The character of Torch (supposedly a descendant of the Jester from earlier album sleeves) is a 29-year-old out-of-work man whose life is a mess. He seeks comfort mostly in alcohol to numb himself. He is trying, but failing, to forget what lies at his feet—a failed marriage, being a deadbeat father, and his lack of commercial success as a singer in a band. As he gets drunk, he also writes about his surroundings and his laments. Since Torch has no other real outlet at his disposal, he ends up in bars, hotel rooms, and on the road, screaming and drunk and is hence described as beyond redemption or hope.

Marillion took a break after their tour in support of the album (with Fish eventually quitting) after it was released. The song "Incommunicado" describes the pitfalls of the business, and how pressures in real life exerted by the band's US label Capitol Records were crushing in from outside for them to either succeed or get dropped by the company, which would happen to Marillion anyway a few years later.

== Cover artwork ==
The front and back covers of the album illustrate Fish's inspiration for the album's lyrics, together with some of his heroes, who are alluded to throughout the album. The setting is in a British pub (the Bakers Arms in Colchester), and the following people are represented:

- On the front from left to right: Robert Burns, Dylan Thomas, Truman Capote and Lenny Bruce
- On the back from left to right: John Lennon, James Dean and Jack Kerouac

Sleeve artist Mark Wilkinson has expressed his disappointment with the sleeve, which he intended to be more detailed and feature more characters but was rushed due to the release date of the album being brought forward:

"It was torture to do. Especially as I got a call almost by the day from EMI or John (manager John Arnison) that if I missed this deadline, the time slot would go, and the tour / album symbiosis put in jeopardy. Somehow I did it, clutching at sleep! EMI were relieved. Fish seemed OK. The rest of the band were a bit unmoved, it was so different to the previous sleeves. I was bloody disappointed! I loved this album, still do. It was some kind of pinnacle as far as I am concerned. Probably my favourite of theirs. And I felt cheated! It was not the sleeve I had imagined. You don't win them all, believe me!"

== Critical reception ==
Professional ratings
Review scores
Source	Rating
AllMusic	4.5/5 stars
Kerrang!	5/5 stars
Q	3/5 stars
Record Mirror	2/5 stars

In 1987, David Hepworth wrote in Q, "Musically, Clutching at Straws doesn't depart far from the educated arrangements of previous albums. However somebody has been applying a stop watch to the individual songs and to the solos within them; thus we have eleven distinct songs, each with its own melodic virtues and most with quite acceptable hook lines barked out by Fish... There are tracks here that could have snuck into Sting's live act quite easily."

John Franck of AllMusic described the album as "perhaps Marillion's most unheralded masterpiece" which "showcases some of the band's most satisfying compositions, including the magnificent 'Warm Wet Circles' and 'That Time of the Night (The Short Straw)' ... Tour opener 'Slainte Mhath' is simple and elegant, building to its dramatic crescendo only to be upstaged by 'Sugar Mice' – quite simply, one of Marillion's best commercial singles ever". "The Last Straw" was also praised as a "stunning closer" to the album.

In 2015, while including Clutching at Straws in the "50 Greatest Prog Rock Albums of All Time", Rolling Stone stated that "Marillion's fourth album balanced melody and melodrama" and commented on the "atmospheric production and guitarist Steve Rothery's spacious, relatively restrained guitar (which split the difference between Genesis' Steve Hackett and U2's the Edge)".

== Formats and re-issues ==
The album was originally released on cassette, vinyl LP, 12" picture disc and was the first Marillion album to be released on compact disc. In 1999, the album was re-released in a remastered version, with the addition of a second CD consisting of demo tapes from the writing sessions for the then-planned untitled and subsequently aborted fifth album, right before Fish left. Much of the leftover musical material was then used on the official fifth Marillion album Seasons End, with new lyrics penned by John Helmer and the new singer Steve Hogarth, while some of the original lyrics for the music ended up in one form or another on Fish's solo albums – for example, the "Voice in the Crowd" concept would inform much of Vigil in a Wilderness of Mirrors. The remastered edition was later also made available without the bonus disc.

A new 180-gram vinyl pressing was released in September 2013 by EMI. It was identical to the original vinyl release from 1987, namely 'Going Under' was not included.

== Track listing ==
All tracks are written by Fish, Mark Kelly, Ian Mosley, Steve Rothery and Pete Trewavas.

Side one
No.	Title	Length
1.	"Hotel Hobbies"	3:35
2.	"Warm Wet Circles"	4:25
3.	"That Time of the Night (The Short Straw)"	6:00
4.	"Just for the Record"	3:09
5.	"White Russian"	6:27

Side two
No.	Title	Length
1.	"Incommunicado"	5:16
2.	"Torch Song"	4:05
3.	"Slàinte Mhath"	4:44
4.	"Sugar Mice"	5:46
5.	"The Last Straw"	5:50
6.	"Happy Ending"	0:08
Total length:		49:25

The CD version of the album includes the bonus track "Going Under" (2:47) between "That Time of the Night" and "Just for the Record". This was not included on the vinyl or cassette versions.

1999 remastered CD edition Disc 2 (bonus tracks)

1. "Incommunicado" (alternative version) – 5:57
2. "Tux On" – 5:13
3. "Going Under" (extended version) – 2:48
4. "Beaujolais Day" – 4:51
5. "Story from a Thin Wall" – 6:47
6. "Shadows on the Barley" – 2:07
7. "Sunset Hill" – 4:21
8. "Tic-Tac-Toe" – 2:59
9. "Voice in the Crowd" – 3:29
10. "Exile on Princes Street" – 5:29
11. "White Russians" (demo) – 6:15
12. "Sugar Mice in the Rain" (demo) – 5:54

=== 4-CD + Blu-ray Disc, 2018, Remastered, Digi-Book ===
CD 1 Clutching at Straws (2018 Andy Bradfield & Avril Mackintosh Re-Mix)

Note: Includes the extended version (with a guitar solo) of "Going Under" as track 4.

CD 2 Live at the Edinburgh Playhouse 19th December 1987 (2018 Michael Hunter Mix)

1. La Gazza Ladra 2:46
2. Slainthe Mhath 5:03
3. Assassing 6:47
4. White Russian 6:25
5. Incubus 10:36
6. Sugar Mice 6:14
7. Fugazi 9:57
8. Hotel Hobbies 4:04
9. Warm Wet Circles 4:17
10. That Time Of The Night 6:00

CD 3 Live at the Edinburgh Playhouse (continued) (2018 Michael Hunter Mix)

1. Pseudo Silk Kimono (intro) 1:06
2. Kayleigh 3:48
3. Lavender 2:34
4. Bitter Suite 8:32
5. Heart Of Lothian 7:23
6. The Last Straw 7:16
7. Incommunicado 5:00
8. Garden Party 6:26
9. Market Square Heroes [incomplete, featuring "My Generation", "Margaret" & "Let's Twist Again"] 10:09

CD 4 Clutching at Straws Demos
1999 Remaster

1. Beaujolais Day
2. Story from a Thin Wall
3. Shadows on the Barley
4. Exile on Princes Street
5. Sunset Hill
6. Tic-Tac-Toe
7. Voice in the Crowd
8. White Russians
9. Sugar Mice in the Rain

Previously Unreleased Demos

10. Hotel Hobbies / Warm Wet Circles (The Mosaic Demos)
11. Just for the Record
12. Torch Song
13. Slàinte Mhath

Blu-ray Disc

Blu-ray Disc

1. Clutching at Straws [Stereo / LPCM Audio 5.1 / DTS Master 5.1] 52:13
2. The Final Straw [Documentary] 60:00
3. Incommunicado [Promo Video] 4:02
4. Sugar Mice [Promo Video] 5:05
5. Warm Wet Circles [Demo] 4:25
6. Clutching at Straws [Original 1987 Album Mix] 52:13
7. Incommunicado [Alternate Version [1999 Remaster Bonus Track] 5:57
8. Tux On [1999 Remaster Bonus Track] 5:13
9. Going Under [1999 Remaster Bonus Track] 2:48

== Personnel ==
Band members

- Fish – vocals
- Steve Rothery – guitars
- Mark Kelly – keyboards
- Pete Trewavas – bass, backing vocals
- Ian Mosley – drums

Additional musicians

- Tessa Niles – backing vocals on "That Time of the Night" and "The Last Straw"
- Chris Kimsey (credited as "Christopher 'Robbin' Kimsey") – backing vocals on "Incommunicado", production
- John Cavanagh – "Dr. Finlay" voice on "Torch Song"

== Charts ==
Chart (1987)	Peak position
Austrian Albums (Ö3 Austria)	16
Canada Top Albums/CDs (RPM)	81
Dutch Albums (Album Top 100)	3
Finnish Albums (The Official Finnish Charts)	15
French Albums (SNEP)	20
German Albums (Offizielle Top 100)	3
Italian Albums (Musica e Dischi)	20
Norwegian Albums (VG-lista)	4
Swedish Albums (Sverigetopplistan)	9
Swiss Albums (Schweizer Hitparade)	2
UK Albums (Official Charts)	2
US Billboard 200	103

Chart (2018)	Peak position
Scottish Albums (Official Charts)	48
UK Rock & Metal Albums (Official Charts)	1

== Certifications ==
Region	Certification	Certified units/sales
Germany (BVMI)	Gold	250,000^{^}
United Kingdom (BPI)	Gold	100,000^{^}
^{^} Shipments figures based on certification alone.
