= Warm Wet Circles =

1987 single by Marillion

Single by Marillion

from the album Clutching at Straws
- B-side: "White Russian (Live)"
- Released: 26 October 1987
- Recorded: 1987
- Genre: Neo-prog
- Length: 4:30
- Label: EMI
- Songwriters: Derek Dick, Mark Kelly, Ian Mosley, Pete Trewavas
- Producer: Chris Kimsey

Marillion singles chronology
"Sugar Mice" (1987)	"Warm Wet Circles" (1987)	"Freaks (Live)" (1988)

Audio sample
- file; help

"Warm Wet Circles" is a song by the British neo-prog band Marillion. It was the third single from their fourth studio album Clutching at Straws, released on 26 October 1987.

"Warm Wet Circles" peaked at number 22 in the UK Singles Chart, becoming the band's 9th top-thirty hit in a row, and remained on the chart for four weeks. The music video featured footage of the band's concert at Lorelei in West Germany on 18 July 1987. The B-side is a live recording of "White Russian", another track from Clutching at Straws also made during the Loreley concert. The 12" version additionally contains a version of "Incommunicado" from this concert.

In Argentina, the single was published under the Spanish title "Círculos Húmedos y Cálidos".

A CD replica of the single was also part of a collector's box-set released in July 2000 which contained Marillion's first twelve singles and was re-issued as a 3-CD set in 2009.

== Track listing ==
=== 7" single ===
==== Side A ====
1. "Warm Wet Circles" (Remix)—04:30

==== Side B ====
1. "White Russian" (Live)—06:14

=== 7" Picture disc ===
1. "Warm Wet Circles" (Remix)—04:30

==== Side B ====
1. "White Russian" (Live)—06:14

=== 12" single/picture disc ===
==== Side A ====
1. "Warm Wet Circles" (Remix)—04:30

==== Side B ====
1. "White Russian" (Live)—06:14
2. "Incommunicado" (Live)—05:23

=== 5" CD single ===
1. "Warm Wet Circles" (Remix)—04:30
2. "White Russian" (Live)—06:14
3. "Incommunicado" (Live)—05:23

Total Time 15:57

All tracks written by Dick/Rothery/Kelly/Trewavas/Mosley.

== Personnel ==
- Fish – vocals
- Steve Rothery – guitars
- Mark Kelly – keyboards
- Pete Trewavas – bass
- Ian Mosley – drums
- Tessa Niles – backing vocals on "Warm Wet Circles"
- Cori Josias – backing vocals on "White Russian" and "Incommunicado"
