= Ao Vivo (2003 Emmerson Nogueira album) =

Live album by Emmerson Nogueira
- Released: 2003
- Venue: Cine-Theatro Central (Juiz de Fora, Minas Gerais, Brazil)
- Genre: Acoustic rock
- Label: Columbia
- Producer: Emmerson Nogueira

Emmerson Nogueira live albums chronology
Ao Vivo (2003)	Ao Vivo (2007)

Ao Vivo is the first live album by Brazilian acoustic rock musician Emmerson Nogueira, released on 2003 by Columbia. Was recorded at Cine-Theatro Central, Juiz de Fora.

== Track listing ==
Disc one: 1-13 tracks / Disc two: 14-27 tracks
#	Title	Original recording
1	Kayleigh	Marillion
2	Follow You Follow Me	Genesis
3	Every Breath You Take	The Police
4	Roxanne	The Police
5	Emotion	Samantha Sang
6	Forever Young	Alphaville
7	I Want to Break Free	Queen
8	Give a Little Bit	Supertramp
9	Show Me the Way/Primeiros Erros (Chove)	Peter Frampton/Kiko Zambianchi
10	A Horse with No Name	America
11	Mrs. Robinson	Simon & Garfunkel
12	The Boxer/Mercedes Benz	Simon & Garfunkel/Janis Joplin
13	Listen to the Music/Stairway to Heaven	The Doobie Brothers/Led Zeppelin
14	Long Train Runnin'/Lady (Hear Me Tonight)/Stayin' Alive	The Doobie Brothers/Modjo/Bee Gees
15	Unchain My Heart/I Will Survive	Ray Charles/Gloria Gaynor
16	Have You Ever Seen the Rain?/Proud Mary	Creedence Clearwater Revival (both)
17	Mustang Sally	Wilson Pickett
18	Wish You Were Here/Breathe	Pink Floyd (both)
19	Hotel California	Eagles
20	Owner of a Lonely Heart	Yes
21	Africa	Toto
22	The Logical Song	Supertramp
23	Tears in Heaven	Eric Clapton
24	Englishman in New York	Sting
25	Dust in the Wind	Kansas
26	Ticket to Ride	The Beatles
27	Never Can Say Goodbye/Não Quero Dinheiro	The Jackson 5/Tim Maia
