= Real to Reel (Marillion album) =

1984 live album by Marillion

- Cover art by Mark Wilkinson

Live album by Marillion
- Released: 5 November 1984
- Recorded: 5 March 1984 at De Montfort Hall (Leicester, England) and 19–20 June 1984 at the Spectrum (Montreal, Canada)
- Genre: Neo-prog
- Length: 46:48 (LP); 52:05 (CD)
- Label: EMI
- Producer: Simon Hanhart; Marillion

Marillion chronology
| Fugazi (1984) | Real to Reel (1984) | Misplaced Childhood (1985) |

Professional ratings
Review scores
| Source | Rating |
|---|---|
| AllMusic | 3/5 stars |

Real to Reel is the first live album by the British neo-prog band Marillion, released in November 1984. It was co-produced by Simon Hanhart who had mixed the first two studio albums and co-produced the studio version of "Cinderella Search".

== Recording and content ==
Real to Reel was recorded on 5 March 1984 at De Montfort Hall in Leicester, England and 19–20 June 1984 at the Spectrum in Montreal, Canada.

In addition to two songs each from the first two albums, Script for a Jester's Tear (1983) and Fugazi (1984), the original LP version (Note: EMI: EG 2603031, JEST 1) contained two tracks previously not available on any albums, the A-side of the band's 1982 debut single "Market Square Heroes" and "Cinderella Search", the B-side of "Assassing". The CD (Note: EMI, Fame: CDM 7 52021 2, CD-FA 3142) and cassette versions contained an extra track, "Emerald Lies" from Fugazi, recorded at the Spectrum.

== Release ==
=== Critical reception ===
Writing for AllMusic, Eduardo Rivadavia praised Real to Reel in a three-out-of-five star retrospective review. He called the album "an excellent live document of Marillion" and "a strong case for the many fans who actually prefer the band's more refined live versions over their rather flat studio counterparts". Rivadavia also claimed 10-minute antiwar "Forgotten Sons" to be the pinnacle of the album.

=== Commercial performance ===
No singles from the album were released, but nevertheless Real to Reel managed to reach number 8 in the UK Albums Chart and linger there for 22 weeks. It was certified Gold by the BPI on 9 July 1985 for sales in excess of 100,000 copies.

=== Formats and reissues ===
Real to Reel was initially released on LP, 12" picture disc, cassette, and CD.

In 1997, the album was re-released as a two-disc set bundled with Brief Encounter, an extended-play originally made by EMI's American label Capitol Records to promote the band's 1986 US tour. This edition was not part of the remastered series of Marillion's first eight studio albums that EMI released in 1997–1998. It was digitally remastered at Abbey Road Studios by Brian Fifield.

In 2005, a Japanese mini-LP replica CD edition (Note: Toshiba-EMI: TOCP-67792) came out. This version included two additional bonus tracks, "Margaret" and "Charting the Single", both originally from the 1983 "Garden Party" single.

== Track listing ==
All tracks are written by Marillion.

Original 1984 CD edition
| No. | Title | Length |
|---|---|---|
| 1. | "Assassing" | 7:29 |
| 2. | "Incubus" | 8:43 |
| 3. | "Cinderella Search" | 5:45 |
| 4. | "Emerald Lies" | 5:28 |
| 5. | "Forgotten Sons" | 10:36 |
| 6. | "Garden Party" | 6:32 |
| 7. | "Market Square Heroes" | 7:32 |
| Total length: | | 52:05 |

- Tracks 1–4 recorded at the Spectrum in Montreal, Canada on 19–20 June 1984
- Tracks 5–7 recorded at De Montfort Hall in Leicester, England on 5 March 1984

2005 Japanese mini-LP replica edition bonus tracks
| No. | Title | Length |
|---|---|---|
| 8. | "Charting the Single" | 6:37 |
| 9. | "Margaret" | 12:22 |
| Total length: | | 71:03 |

- "Charting the Single" recorded at the Hammersmith Odeon in London, England on 18 April 1983
- "Margaret" recorded at Edinburgh Playhouse on 7 April 1983

Original 1984 LP edition

Side one
| No. | Title | Length |
|---|---|---|
| 1. | "Assassing" | 7:18 |
| 2. | "Incubus" | 8:31 |
| 3. | "Cinderella Search" | 5:24 |

Side two
| No. | Title | Length |
|---|---|---|
| 4. | "Forgotten Sons" | 10:11 |
| 5. | "Garden Party" | 6:30 |
| 6. | "Market Square Heroes" | 6:49 |
| Total length: | | 46:48 |

== Personnel ==
Marillion

- Fish – vocals; sleeve concept
- Steve Rothery – guitars
- Mark Kelly – keyboards
- Pete Trewavas – bass, backing vocals
- Ian Mosley – drums
- Mick Pointer – drums on Japanese bonus tracks

Technical personnel

- Simon Hanhart – production and mixing (The Marquee Studios, London)
- Julian Cull – photography
- Mark Wilkinson – sleeve
- Julie Hazelwood – collage

== Charts ==
| Chart (1984) | Peak position |
|---|---|
| German Albums (Offizielle Top 100) | 38 |
| Swedish Albums (Sverigetopplistan) | 49 |
| UK Albums (OCC) | 8 |

== Certifications ==
| Region | Certification | Certified units/sales |
|---|---|---|
| United Kingdom (BPI) | Gold | 100,000^{^} |
^{^} Shipments figures based on certification alone.
