= Freaks (Marillion song) =

"Freaks (live)"

Single by Marillion

from the album The Thieving Magpie
- B-side: "Kayleigh"
- Released: 14 November 1988
- Recorded: 1986
- Genre: Neo-prog
- Label: EMI Records
- Songwriters: Derek Dick, Mark Kelly, Ian Mosley, Steve Rothery, Pete Trewavas
- Producers: Marillion and Privet Hedge (Christopher Hedge)

Marillion singles chronology
"Warm Wet Circles" (1987)	"Freaks (live)" (1988)	"Hooks in You" (1989)

Audio sample
- file; help

"Freaks" is a song by British neo-prog band Marillion. First released in 1985 on the B-side to the number five UK hit single "Lavender", in November 1988 it was released in a live version on a double A-side single together with the band's 1985 number two hit, "Kayleigh". The single was intended to promote the forthcoming double-live album The Thieving Magpie, which documents the band's history with singer Fish, who had left the band in October 1988; as such, this was Marillion's last single to feature Fish on vocals and cover art by Mark Wilkinson, who would go on to collaborate with Fish.

The single peaked at no. 24 in the UK Singles Chart, becoming their eleventh consecutive UK Top 40 hit.

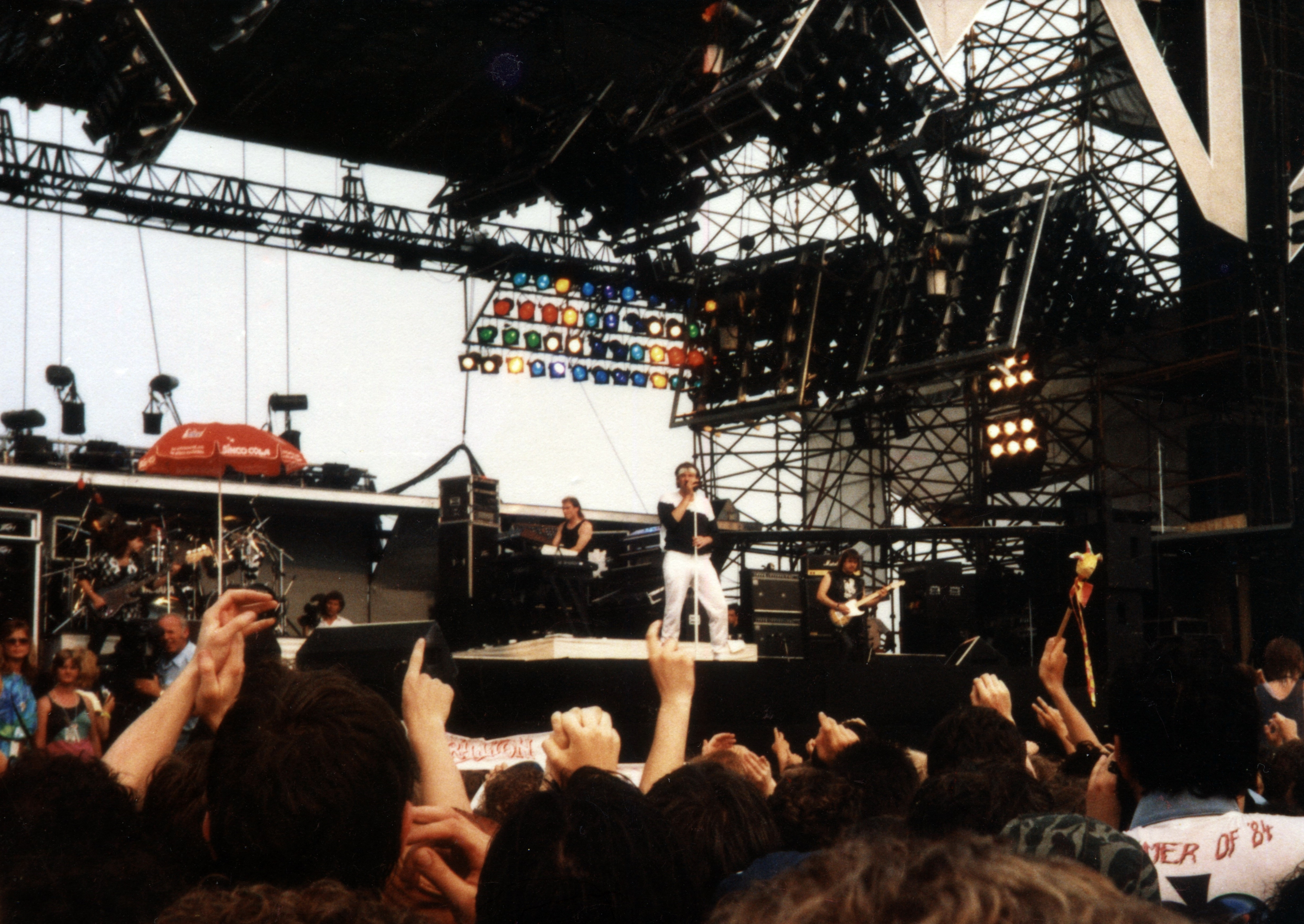
Marillion supporting Queen at an open-air in Mannheim, Germany, June 21, 1986 – this version of "Freaks" was recorded during this show.

The track "Freaks" (recorded at an open-air concert at the May Market Fairground in Mannheim, Germany, on 21 June 1986) was only included on the CD and cassette versions of The Thieving Magpie, "Kayleigh" (recorded at London Hammersmith Odeon on 9 or 10 January 1986) was also available on the vinyl edition, which only featured the first half of the Misplaced Childhood album. The 12" version contained an additional two tracks from the second half of Misplaced Childhood, which are also not found on the vinyl version of The Thieving Magpie.

"Freaks" was performed on the Jim Henson television series The Ghost of Faffner Hall as a song that Fish helps one of the puppet characters write.

A CD replica of the single was also part of a collectors box-set released in July 2000 which contained Marillion's first twelve singles and was re-issued as a 3-CD set in 2009 (see The Singles '82–'88).

== Track listing ==
=== 7" Single* / Cut-out picture disc ===
==== Side A ====
1. "Freaks (Live)" — 4:12

==== Side B ====
1. "Kayleigh (Live)" — 4:08

*On the Dutch version of the 7" single, which was re-released in January 1989, "Kayleigh" and "Freaks" are reversed.

=== 12" Single ===
==== Side A ====
1. "Freaks (Live)" — 4:12
2. "Kayleigh (Live)" — 4:08

==== Side B ====
1. "Childhoods End? (Live)" — 3:10
2. "White Feather (Live)" — 4:00

=== 5" CD Single ===
1. "Freaks (Live)" — 4:12
2. "Kayleigh (Live)" — 4:08
3. "Childhoods End? (Live)" — 3:10
4. "White Feather (Live)" — 4:00

== Personnel ==
- Fish – vocals
- Steve Rothery – guitars
- Mark Kelly – keyboards
- Pete Trewavas – bass
- Ian Mosley – drums
