= Comedy in the Dark =

Comedy Performance

Comedy in the Dark is a comedy performance taking place in the dark. The show was developed and produced by the Leicester Comedy Festival, with the first performance taking place at Belmont Hotel, Leicester, England on October 13, 2009. The show was originally developed to promote energy conservation.

Comedy in the Dark was also presented at Edinburgh Fringe 2010, based at the Gilded Balloon. Money from the shows was donated to the Comedy Wood - a real wood planted with donations from comedians and audience members.
