= Heart of Lothian =

Single by Marillion

from the album Misplaced Childhood
- B-side: "Chelsea Monday (live)"
- Released: 18 November 1985
- Recorded: Hansa Ton Studios, Berlin, March–May 1985
- Genre: Neo-prog
- Length: 3:40
- Label: EMI
- Songwriter(s): Derek Dick, Mark Kelly, Ian Mosley, Steve Rothery, Pete Trewavas,
- Producer(s): Chris Kimsey for Wonderknob Ltd

Marillion singles chronology
"Lavender" (1985)	"Heart of Lothian" (1985)	"Lady Nina" (1986)

Audio sample
- file; help

"Heart of Lothian" is a song by British neo-prog band Marillion. It is the fifth track on the 1985 concept album Misplaced Childhood. The song was released as the third single from Misplaced Childhood on 18 November 1985 in the UK, the Netherlands, West Germany, Canada (on Capitol Records), South Africa and Australia. "Heart of Lothian" became the third Top 30 UK single from Misplaced Childhood, peaking at number 29. The song also peaked at number 51 on the German singles chart.

The single version of Heart of Lothian actually begins with the last two sections of Bitter Suite: part d, Misplaced Rendezvous (minus the vocals that appear on the album) and part e, Windswept Thumb, before segueing into part a of Heart of Lothian, Wide Boy, but ends without including part b, Curtain Call.

The 7" and 12" formats of the single both featured a live version of "Chelsea Monday", originally a track from Marillion's debut 1983 album Script for a Jester's Tear as the b-side. This was recorded at the Muziekcentrum Vredenburg in Utrecht on 15 October 1985. The 12" also includes the extended album version of "Heart of Lothian" as well as the single edit. In the US, the song was first used as the b-side for "Kayleigh", the band's European hit single. In 1986, "Heart of Lothian" reappeared as a b-side to the US-only single release "Lady Nina", which had in turn appeared as a b-side on the European release of the lead single from Misplaced Childhood, "Kayleigh".

As all of Misplaced Childhood, the title track was produced by Chris Kimsey, while the live recording of "Chelsea Monday" was mixed by Mark Freegard. The cover art was designed by Mark Wilkinson and in the background features the Dugald Stewart Monument, a well-known Edinburgh landmark. There are other references to Edinburgh in the song— the title itself refers to the Heart of Midlothian, one line reads "And anarchy smiles on the Royal Mile".

A CD replica of the single was also part of a collectors box-set released in July 2000 which contained Marillion's first twelve singles and was re-issued as a 3-CD set in 2009 (see The Singles '82–'88).

== Track listing ==
=== 7" single ===
==== Side A ====
1. "Heart of Lothian"—03:49 (Dick/Rothery/Kelly/Trewavas/Mosley)

==== Side B ====
1. "Chelsea Monday" (Live Version)—07:21 (Dick/Rothery/Kelly/Trewavas/Pointer)

=== 12" single ===
==== Side A ====
1. "Heart of Lothian" (Full version)—05:43

==== Side B ====
1. "Chelsea Monday" (Live Version)—07:23
2. "Heart of Lothian"—03:40

== Personnel ==
- Fish – vocals
- Steve Rothery – guitars
- Mark Kelly – keyboards
- Pete Trewavas – bass
- Ian Mosley – drums
