= Emmerson Nogueira =

Brazilian guitarist

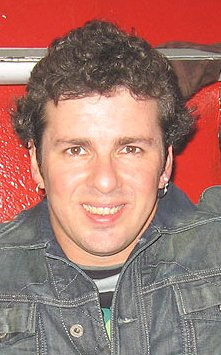

Background information
- Born: Emmerson Oliveira Nogueira; September 23, 1973 (age 53)
- Origin: São João Nepomuceno, Minas Gerais, Brazil
- Genres: Acoustic music, rock music
- Occupations: Solo singer, musical producer
- Instruments: Vocals, acoustic guitar, electric guitar, bass guitar, keyboards
- Years active: 1987–present
- Website: emmersonnogueira.com.br/site.htm

Emmerson Oliveira Nogueira (born September 23, 1973) is a Brazilian guitarist and songwriter notable for releasing only cover albums, containing acoustic versions of several internationally famous English-speaking songs.

== Childhood ==
Emmerson was born in Belo Horizonte, Minas Gerais, to Luiz Carlos Nogueira and Bernardina de Oliveira, and soon moved to São João Nepomuceno, also in Minas Gerais. He has five siblings: Heloiza, Anderson, Renata, Juninho e Helena.

He first got involved with music by the age of 14. By that time, he also developed an interest for drawing, but soon quit it to devote to music.

As an evangelical, he performed on a local church and won many festivals of Gospel music. He soon moved to Juiz de Fora, without the approval of his family, who didn't believe he could survive all by himself. Those were difficult times for him, but he couldn't tell anything to his parents, otherwise his father would take him back to the family. He would play with friends in local pubs and restaurants for a living.

Back to São João Nepomuceno, he formed various bands like "The Kingsize Tailors and The Nicotinos", "Led Zeppelin Cover", " The Wait " and "Xadcaramelo" and continued to perform in pubs. He also made several partnerships with people like Ana Carolina, who invited him to perform in her Ana Carolina Convida show, where he was much acclaimed for his guitar playing. He also once partnered with his cousin Kiko Furtado, the Brazilian singer Cristiane Visentin and Leoni, ex-singer of Kid Abelha.

== Career ==
In 2000, one of his dreams came true, he presented his works to Sony Music and was subsequently signed with them. In the same year he released his first album, called Versão Acústica. The success was so great that he had to return home to Brazil to go on tour for the album. The album sold more than 100,000 copies in the first six months, without any media exposure at all. The following album, Versão Acústica 2, released in November 2002, sold twice as fast as his first. The third Versão Acústica sold very well too. In 2004, he released an album containing only The Beatles covers. In 2005, he released his fifth album, called Miltons, Minas e Mais in which he explored the sound of famous musicians from Minas Gerais, like Milton Nascimento.

== Discography ==
=== Studio albums ===
- Versão Acústica (2001)
- Versão Acústica 2 (2002)
- Versão Acústica 3 (2003)
- Beatles (2004)
- Miltons, Minas e Mais (2005)
- Dreamer (2008)
- Versão Acústica 4 (2009)
- Emmerson Nogueira (2014)
- Versão Acústica 5 (2015)
- Estúdio Versão Acústica Sessions (2019)

=== Live/video albums ===
- Ao Vivo (2003)
- Ao Vivo (2007)
- Ao Vivo Vol. 2 (2010)
