= Emmerson Nogueira (album) =

Studio album by Emmerson Nogueira
- Released: June 13, 2014
- Recorded: September 2013
- Genre: Acoustic rock, MPB
- Length: 40:19
- Label: Sony Music
- Producer: Emmerson Nogueira

Emmerson Nogueira studio albums chronology
Versão Acústica 4 (2009)	Emmerson Nogueira (2014)	Versão Acústica 5 (2015)

Emmerson Nogueira is the eighth studio album by the Brazilian Acoustic rock musician Emmerson Nogueira, released on June 13, 2014 by Sony Music.

This is his first album to be entirely made of original compositions, instead of the covers he usually works on. Another difference from previous albums is that, instead of working with his backing band, Versão Acústica, Nogueira recorded all instruments (acoustic, electric and bass guitar, drums and electric piano) on his own, using the acoustic guitar as the base for composing.

The album's songs were composed throughout many years. Some were co-composed with musician Paulinho Cri, dead in 2012, and these were created between 1978 and 1989. All the others are from the 1990s, when Nogueira took part of many music festivals in Minas Gerais. According to him, the inspiration for composing the tracks comes "from life, from the soul, from lost and conquered loves, from the wind, from the perfume of the ridge and from everything that life keeps as a surprise everyday".

== Track listing ==
No.	Title	Writer(s)	Length
1.	"A Nova Canção da Rosa"	Emmerson Nogueira	4:09
2.	"Lição da Noite"	Paulinho Cri	4:31
3.	"O Tubarão"	Paulinho Cri	2:41
4.	"O Mar e a Maré"	Emmerson Nogueira	5:00
5.	"A Arca de Noé do Futuro"	Paulinho Cri, Mari Bertolini	3:25
6.	"Noite nas Colinas"	Paulinho Cri	3:43
7.	"Herança Lusitana"	Paulinho Cri	4:12
8.	"Feeling Blue" (instrumental)	Emmerson Nogueira	0:36
9.	"Na Cabeça Encantada"	Paulinho Cri	3:32
10.	"Fim de Todas as Canções"	Emmerson Nogueira	3:32
11.	"A Penúltima Viagem" (instrumental)	Emmerson Nogueira	2:01
12.	"Chuva na Serra"	Paulinho Cri	2:09
Total length:			40:19
