= Little Theatre (Leicester) =

Theatre venue in Leicester, England

Leicester Little Theatre
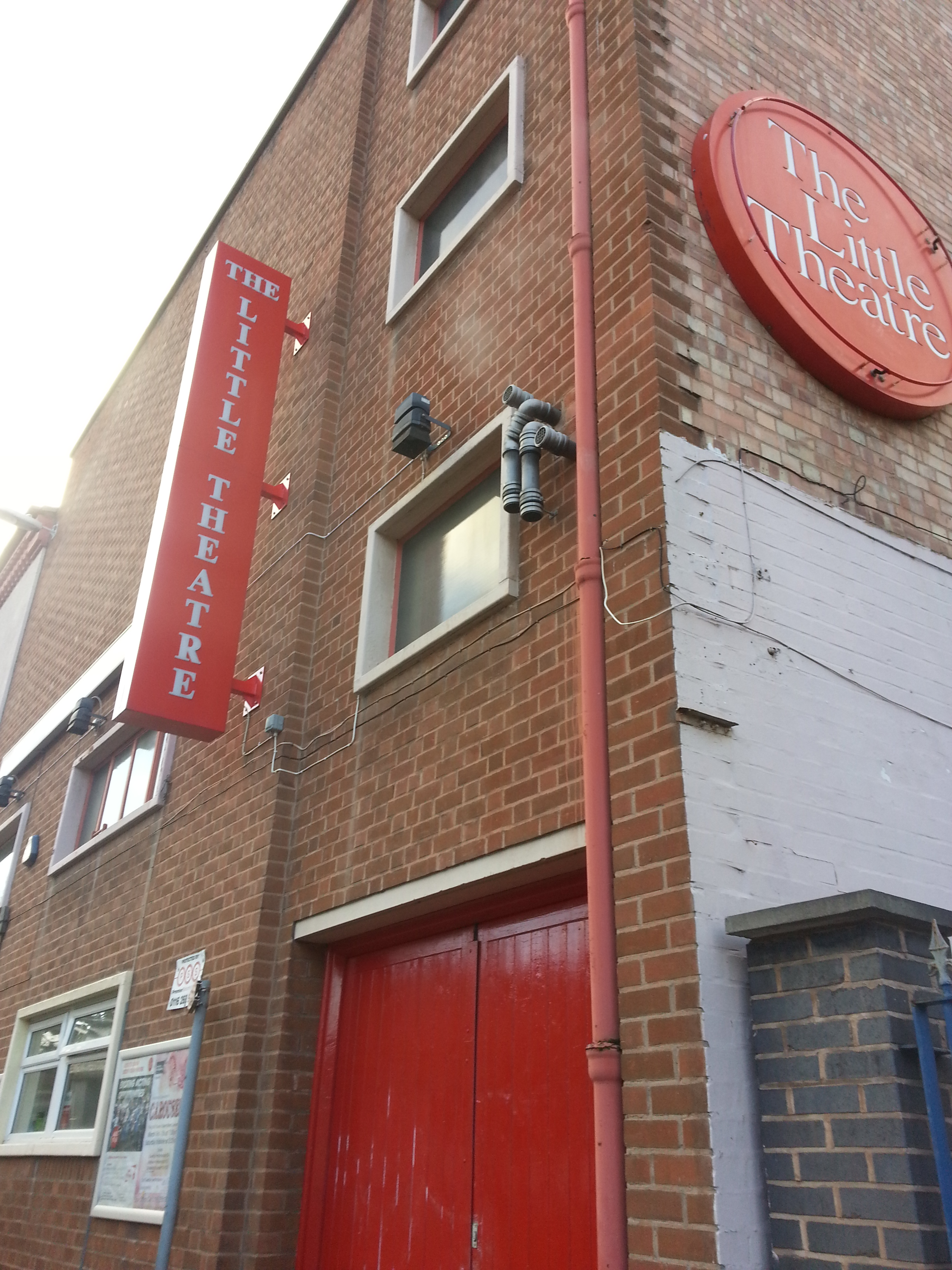
- Interactive map of Leicester Little Theatre
- Address: Leicester; England, UK
- Coordinates: 52.6318°N 1.1292°W
- Owner: Leicester Drama Society
- Capacity: 349
- Type: Amateur Theatre

Construction
- Opened: 1932

Website
- http://www.thelittletheatre.co.uk/

The Little Theatre is a theatre venue based in Leicester, England, which is operated by the Leicester Drama Society (LDS). The Theatre has a main auditorium which seats 349, along with an additional studio space. The theatre facilities include a bar, two rehearsal spaces, library and costume hire. The Little Theatre hosts around 200 productions a year, has an annual turnover of £580,000 and receives 50,000 visitors a year. The theatre is equipped for audio description.

Productions at The Little Theatre are primarily plays from the resident amateur theatre company LDS and its members. LDS produce around 200 productions a year, with each season consisting of 12 plays and 1 pantomime. LDS productions usually consist of 6 evening performances and 1 matinee performance. LDS also hire the venue to professional acts, other community groups and events. Acts have included Prunella Scales, William Roache, Topping and Butch and Charles Dance. A youth theatre group also operates for ages 8–12, and 13–18.

Leicester born playwright Joe Orton and actor Richard Attenborough are both former alumni from the society.

== History ==
Leicester Drama Society was formed in 1922 and occupied the upper floor of the old Rechabite Chapel on Dover Street, Leicester. The society purchased the building for £14,000 in 1932, renaming the building The Little Theatre.

In 1955 parts of the theatre had to be rebuilt due to a fire.

In 2011 the theatre celebrated its 1,000th production with the Thornton Wilder play Our Town.

In 2012 the theatre won Best Venue in Dave's Leicester Comedy Festival Awards.

In 2012 it was announced that The Little Theatre would be expanding. The expansion would result in two new rehearsal rooms, new studio, new workshop, new box office and foyer as well as providing better disabled access. The build requires the theatre to raise £2 million. The project was due to start in 2015, but suffered with funding issues. In 2018, Mayor Peter Soulsby offered the Little Theatre £280,000 if they could raise £3 million on their own. The project was due for completion is 2022, in keeping with the Centenary of the theatre.

== See also ==
- Leicester Comedy Festival
- Sue Townsend Theatre
- Curve (theatre)
- Haymarket Theatre (Leicester)
- De Montfort Hall
