= Versão Acústica 2 =

Studio album by Emmerson Nogueira
- Released: December 6, 2002
- Recorded: August 2002
- Genre: Acoustic rock
- Length: 1:10:00
- Label: Columbia
- Producer: Emmerson Nogueira

Emmerson Nogueira studio albums chronology
Versão Acústica (2001)	Versão Acústica 2 (2002)	Versão Acústica 3 (2003)

Versão Acústica 2 is the second album by Brazilian Acoustic rock musician Emmerson Nogueira, released on December 6, 2002, by Columbia. It features covers of hits by many famous international bands and musicians.

== Track listing ==
No.	Title	Original recording	Length
1.	"Every Little Thing She Does Is Magic"	The Police	3:10
2.	"Africa"	Toto	4:27
3.	"More Than Words"	Extreme	3:53
4.	"The Boxer"	Simon & Garfunkel	4:33
5.	"The Logical Song"	Supertramp	3:08
6.	"Ticket to Ride"	The Beatles	3:23
7.	"Wild World"	Cat Stevens	4:15
8.	"I Don't Want to Talk About It"	Crazy Horse	4:06
9.	"Skyline Pigeon"	Elton John	4:04
10.	"Tom Sawyer"	Rush	3:23
11.	"Long Train Runnin'"	The Doobie Brothers	2:57
12.	"Blowin' in the Wind"	Bob Dylan	3:50
13.	"Follow You Follow Me"	Genesis	4:03
14.	"Crazy"	Seal	4:29
15.	"You've Got a Friend"	Carole King	4:58
16.	"Ventura Highway"	America	3:28
17.	"All My Love"	Led Zeppelin	5:12
18.	"Mercedes Benz"	Janis Joplin	2:45
Total length:			1:10:00
