= Versão Acústica 3 =

Studio album by Emmerson Nogueira
- Released: December 8, 2003
- Recorded: October 2003
- Genre: Acoustic rock
- Length: 1:04:00
- Label: Columbia
- Producer: Emmerson Nogueira

Emmerson Nogueira studio albums chronology
Versão Acústica 2 (2002)	Versão Acústica 3 (2003)	Beatles (2004)

Versão Acústica 3 is the third studio album by Brazilian Acoustic rock musician Emmerson Nogueira, released on December 8, 2003, by Columbia. It features covers of hits by many famous international bands and musicians.

== Track listing ==
No.	Title	Original recording	Length
1.	"Rosanna"	Toto	3:40
2.	"Money"	Pink Floyd	3:13
3.	"Sailing"	Christopher Cross	4:18
4.	"Baby, I Love Your Way"	Peter Frampton	5:01
5.	"Happy Man"	Peter Cetera	3:16
6.	"Against All Odds (Take a Look at Me Now)"	Phil Collins	3:12
7.	"Ordinary World"	Duran Duran	4:07
8.	"Everybody Wants to Rule the World"	Tears for Fears	4:16
9.	"Overkill"	Men at Work	3:29
10.	"Radio Ga Ga"	Queen	4:50
11.	"I Heard It Through the Grapevine"	Gladys Knight & the Pips	3:21
12.	"Heaven"	Bryan Adams	4:18
13.	"I Still Haven't Found What I'm Looking For"	U2	4:00
14.	"It's Raining Again"	Supertramp	3:53
15.	"Diamonds On the Inside"	Ben Harper	4:48
16.	"My Sweet Lord"	George Harrison	4:34
Total length:			1:04:00
