= Versão Acústica 4 =

Studio album by Emmerson Nogueira
- Released: November 13, 2009
- Recorded: March 2009
- Genre: Acoustic rock
- Length: 1:10:00
- Label: Sony Music
- Producer: Emmerson Nogueira

Emmerson Nogueira studio albums chronology
Dreamer (2008)	Versão Acústica 4 (2009)	Emmerson Nogueira (2014)

Versão Acústica 4 is the seventh studio album by Brazilian Acoustic rock musician Emmerson Nogueira, released on November 13, 2009, by Sony Music. It features covers of hits by many famous international bands and musicians.

== Track listing ==
No.	Title	Original recording	Length
1.	"Tin Man"	America	3:41
2.	"Kiss from a Rose"	Seal	4:45
3.	"Homeward Bound"	Simon & Garfunkel	2:35
4.	"Shine On You Crazy Diamond"	Pink Floyd	5:32
5.	"El Cóndor Pasa (If I Could)"	Simon & Garfunkel feat. Los Incas	4:32
6.	"Sweet Home Alabama"	Lynyrd Skynyrd	4:13
7.	"Changes"	Black Sabbath	4:14
8.	"Fields of Gold"	Sting	4:27
9.	"Hide in Your Shell"	Supertramp	6:48
10.	"America"	Simon & Garfunkel	3:37
11.	"Rocket Man"	Elton John	4:58
12.	"Stand by Me"	Ben E. King	4:22
13.	"Coming Up"	Paul McCartney	3:25
14.	"Breakfast in America"	Supertramp	3:59
15.	"You Are So Beautiful"	Joe Cocker	3:42
16.	"Nucleus"	Instrumental	5:07
Total length:			1:10:00
