= Sugar Mice =

1987 single by Marillion

Single by Marillion

from the album Clutching at Straws
- B-side: "Tux On"
- Released: 13 July 1987
- Genre: Rock
- Length: 5:47
- Label: EMI
- Songwriter(s): Derek Dick; Mark Kelly; Ian Mosley; Steve Rothery; Pete Trewavas
- Producer(s): Chris Kimsey

Marillion singles chronology
"Incommunicado" (1987)	"Sugar Mice" (1987)	"Warm Wet Circles" (1987)

Audio sample
- file; help

"Sugar Mice" is a song by British neo-prog band Marillion. It was released as the second single from their fourth studio album, Clutching at Straws (1987). Released on 13 July 1987, it peaked at number 22 in the UK Singles Chart, becoming the band's eighth top-30 hit in a row. Outside the UK, it charted in the Netherlands and West Germany.

== Background ==
A protest song that directly addresses the devastating effect unemployment can have on personal relationships, the track takes the form of a melancholic rock ballad with lyrics from the perspective of a British worker who emigrates to the U.S. to find a job, leaving behind his family. He ends up in despair, drinking in a hotel bar in Milwaukee and blaming the government for leaving him out of work. Lyricist Fish described the background as follows:

I was laying [sic] in bed in the Holiday Inn and looking up at the ceiling at some hearts 'n' stuff that some lovers had carved, and I was feeling really down. So I rang my old lady but it was a bad phone call; lots of long silences. I felt even more depressed.

The first-person narrator sums up his feelings with the metaphor "We're just sugar mice in the rain", which lends the title to the song.

Performing "Sugar Mice" at the band's concert Live from Loreley in 1987, Fish dedicated it to "all the unemployed people in Europe today, to the romantics, to the dreamers and to those who still have hearts".

== Release ==
A number of formats were available: 7-inch single, 7-inch picture disc (containing a fold-out sleeve with a poster), 12-inch single, 12-inch picture disc. 3,000 copies of a 5" CD single were produced that were exclusively sold at concerts. The 12-inch and 5-inch CD single featured an extended version of the title track, containing some extra music between the first and second verse. The B-side, "Tux On", is a song that tells the story of a rising rock star who gradually loses touch with reality and finally ends up abusing drugs. A CD replica of the single was also part of a collectors box-set released in July 2000 which contained Marillion's first twelve singles and was re-issued as a 3-CD set in 2009 (see The Singles '82–88').

== Cover art ==
The cover was designed by the band's regular artist Mark Wilkinson. Unlike the covers of the album Clutching at Straws and the first single from it, "Incommunicado", which had been collages based on photographs, this one again featured Wilkinson's signature airbrush style. It shows sugar mice around a cocktail glass, melting from spilled liquid, with a male face in the background.

== Track listings ==
All tracks were written by Derek Dick, Mark Kelly, Ian Mosley, Steve Rothery, and Pete Trewavas.

7-inch single

A. "Sugar Mice" (album version) – 5:47
B. "Tux On" – 5:12

7-inch picture disc

A. "Sugar Mice" (radio edit) – 5:00
B. "Tux On" – 5:09

12-inch picture disc

A1. "Sugar Mice" (extended version) – 6:08
B1. "Sugar Mice" (album version) – 5:45
B2. "Tux On" – 5:12

CD single

1. "Sugar Mice" (radio edit) – 5:00
2. "Tux On" – 5:09
3. "Sugar Mice" (extended version) – 6:09

== Personnel ==
- Fish – vocals
- Steve Rothery – guitars
- Mark Kelly – keyboards
- Pete Trewavas – bass
- Ian Mosley – drums

== Charts ==
Chart (1987)	Peak position
Europe (European Hot 100 Singles)	68
Ireland (IRMA)	17
Netherlands (Single Top 100)	45
UK Singles (OCC)	22
West Germany (GfK)	59
