= Beatles (Emmerson Nogueira album) =

Studio album by Emmerson Nogueira
- Released: December 13, 2004
- Recorded: 2004
- Genre: Acoustic rock
- Length: 41:00
- Label: Columbia
- Producer: Emmerson Nogueira

Emmerson Nogueira studio albums chronology
Versão Acústica 3 (2003)	Beatles (2004)	Miltons, Minas e Mais (2005)

Beatles is the fourth studio album by Brazilian Acoustic rock musician Emmerson Nogueira, released on December 13, 2004, by Columbia. It is a tribute to The Beatles, featuring 14 acoustic versions by famous songs composed by Lennon–McCartney.

== Track listing ==
All tracks are written by Lennon–McCartney.

No.	Title	Length
1.	"A Hard Day's Night"	3:22
2.	"You've Got to Hide Your Love Away"	3:45
3.	"Mother Nature's Son"	3:01
4.	"With a Little Help from My Friends"	2:44
5.	"Nowhere Man"	3:11
6.	"Blackbird"	2:19
7.	"I've Just Seen a Face"	2:43
8.	"Golden Slumbers"	1:37
9.	"Love Me Do"	2:46
10.	"We Can Work It Out"	2:37
11.	"Norwegian Wood (This Bird Has Flown)"	3:29
12.	"Across the Universe"	4:01
13.	"From Me to You"	2:41
14.	"Help!"	2:36
Total length:		41:00
