= Miltons, Minas e Mais =

Studio album by Emmerson Nogueira
- Released: December 19, 2005
- Recorded: 2005
- Genre: Acoustic rock
- Length: 43:18
- Label: Sony BMG
- Producer: Emmerson Nogueira

Emmerson Nogueira studio albums chronology
Beatles (2004)	Miltons, Minas e Mais (2005)	Dreamer (2008)

Miltons, Minas e Mais is the fifth studio album by Brazilian Acoustic rock musician Emmerson Nogueira, released on December 19, 2005, by Sony BMG. In this album, Emmerson explores the music from his state, Minas Gerais, by covering songs from famous Mineiros musicians: Beto Guedes, Lô Borges, Milton Nascimento and 14 Bis.

== Track listing ==
No.	Title	Original recording	Length
1.	"Um Girassol da Cor do Seu Cabelo"	Lô Borges	5:34
2.	"Maria Maria"	Milton Nascimento	2:59
3.	"Anima"	Milton Nascimento	3:16
4.	"Maria Solidária"	Milton Nascimento	2:44
5.	"Fé Cega, Faca Amolada"	Milton Nascimento	4:44
6.	"Lumiar"	Beto Guedes	3:01
7.	"Natural"	14 Bis	4:12
8.	"Paula e Bebeto"	Milton Nascimento	2:50
9.	"Raça"	Milton Nascimento	3:10
10.	"Mesmo de Brincadeira"	14 Bis	3:33
11.	"Paisagem na Janela"	Beto Guedes	3:14
12.	"Nada Será Como Antes"	Milton Nascimento	3:53
Total length:			43:18
