= Dreamer (Emmerson Nogueira album) =

Studio album by Emmerson Nogueira
- Released: October 13, 2008
- Recorded: 2008
- Genre: Acoustic rock
- Length: 45:22
- Label: Sony BMG
- Producer: Emmerson Nogueira

Emmerson Nogueira studio albums chronology
Miltons, Minas e Mais (2005)	Dreamer (2008)	Versão Acústica 4 (2009)

Dreamer is the sixth studio album by Brazilian Acoustic rock musician Emmerson Nogueira, released on October 13, 2008, by Sony BMG.

== Track listing ==
No.	Title	Original recording	Length
1.	"Daniel"	Lior	4:00
2.	"Dreamer"	Supertramp	3:49
3.	"Jesusland"	Ben Folds	4:29
4.	"Heartbeats"	The Knife	3:37
5.	"Better Way"	Ben Harper	4:14
6.	"Spectrum"	Zach Gill	3:24
7.	"No Rain"	Blind Melon	4:07
8.	"Smile"	Pete Murray	3:15
9.	"You Give Me Something"	James Morrison	3:38
10.	"Virginia Moon"	Foo Fighters	3:40
11.	"Let It Go"	Donavon Frankenreiter	4:06
12.	"La Viola"	Instrumental	2:57
Total length:			45:22
