= Assassing =

1984 single by Marillion

Single by Marillion

from the album Fugazi
- B-side: "Cinderella Search"
- Released: 30 April 1984 (UK)
- Recorded: December 1983
- Genre: Neo-prog
- Length: 7:02 (single version = 3:39)
- Label: EMI
- Songwriter: Dick/Kelly/Rothery/Trewavas
- Producer: Nick Tauber

Marillion singles chronology
"Punch and Judy" (1984)	"Assassing" (1984)	"Kayleigh" (1985)

Audio sample
- file; help

"Assassing" is a song by the British neo-prog band Marillion. It was the second single from their second studio album, Fugazi (1984). The single reached no. 22 on the UK singles charts in May 1984. The 7" single's title track is a heavily edited version of the first track on Fugazi, with a length of 03:39 as opposed to the album version with 07:01. The B-side is the non-album track "Cinderella Search".

The lyrics of the song, which feature a narrator-character describing himself as an assassin, appear to concern character assassination. The lyrics are full of metaphors alluding to verbal fighting, for example, "unsheath the blade within the voice." The lyrics are generally interpreted as a reference to the verbal arguments that preceded Marillion founder and drummer Mick Pointer's departure from the band. However, in the track by track breakdown of each song on the Blu-ray portion of the 2021 Deluxe Remastered Edition of the Fugazi album, Fish stated the lyrics were directed at Marillion's bass player in the band's first stable line up, Diz Minnitt.

The international 12" version contains both the full album version and the edited version of the title track; the latter is missing from the UK release. The b-side also appears in a significantly longer version.

As with all Marillion albums and singles of the Fish period, the cover art was created by Mark Wilkinson.

A CD replica of the single was also part of a collectors box-set released in July 2000 which contained Marillion's first twelve singles and was re-issued as a 3-CD set in 2009 (see The Singles '82–'88).

== Track listing ==
=== 7" versions ===
==== Side 1 ====
1. "Assassing" [Edited version] – 3:39

==== Side 2 ====
1. "Cinderella Search" [Edited version] – 4:19

=== 12" versions ===
==== Side 1 ====
1. "Assassing" [Full version] – 7:01

==== Side 2 ====
1. "Cinderella Search" [Full version] – 5:24
2. "Assassing" [Edited version] – 3:38 (not on UK version)

== Personnel ==
- Fish – vocals
- Steve Rothery – guitars
- Mark Kelly – keyboards
- Pete Trewavas – bass
- Ian Mosley – drums
