= Incommunicado (song) =

1987 single by Marillion

Single by Marillion

from the album Clutching at Straws
- B-side: "Going Under"
- Released: 11 May 1987
- Genre: Rock
- Length: 6:44 (7-inch single); 13:58 (12-inch, CD single)
- Label: EMI
- Songwriters: Derek Dick, Mark Kelly, Ian Mosley, Steve Rothery, Pete Trewavas
- Producer: Chris Kimsey

Marillion singles chronology
"Lady Nina" (1986)	"Incommunicado" (1987)	"Sugar Mice" (1987)

Audio sample
- file; help

"Incommunicado" is a song by British neo-prog band Marillion. It served as the lead single from their fourth studio album, Clutching at Straws (1987). Released on 11 May 1987, it reached number six on the UK singles chart, becoming the band's third top 10 hit and their last until 2004's "You're Gone". It also became a top 40 hit in Ireland, the Netherlands, Switzerland, and West Germany, as well as on the US Album Rock Tracks chart.

== Composition and release ==
The A-side is a fast, anthemic rock song with a repeated chorus and dominant keyboards from Mark Kelly. Kelly's solo was later cited as an inspiration by Adam Wakeman. Lead singer and lyricist Fish acknowledged a similarity between the song and the work of the Who.

The extended version on the twelve-inch and CD singles is slightly longer than the album version and features some additional sound effects. The B-side, the short, slow, and introspective "Going Under", would also appear as a bonus track on the CD version of Clutching at Straws, in a slightly different version. Both tracks were written and arranged by Marillion and produced by Chris Kimsey.

The line "currently residing in the where-are-they-now file" is a reference to a scene in the film This Is Spinal Tap.

A CD replica of the single was also part of a collectors box-set released in July 2000 which contained Marillion's first twelve singles and was re-issued as a 3-CD set in 2009 (see The Singles '82–'88).

== Cover art ==
The cover was designed by the band's regular artist at the time, Mark Wilkinson; however, instead of the usual airbrush style, it was a collage based on a colourised photograph of fans waiting outside the Marquee Club, then still in Wardour Street (there are some posters advertising a Then Jerico gig on the door). Only the eccentrically dressed, pivotal "angel" character (an alternate design of the Torch character who appears on the Clutching at Straws album cover) standing at the door apart from the crowd, was painted in Wilkinson's traditional style. The scene alludes to the song's main topic, success alienating artists from their fans and reality in general. On the back cover, there is a quotation supposedly from Seneca the Younger's Moral Epistles ("This mime of mortal life, in which we are apportioned roles we misinterpret.")

== Track listings ==
7-inch single

A. "Incommunicado"
B. "Going Under"

12-inch and CD single

A1. "Incommunicado" (album version)
B1. "Incommunicado" (alternative mix)
B2. "Going Under"

== Charts ==
Chart (1987)	Peak position
Europe (European Hot 100 Singles)	21
Ireland (IRMA)	4
Netherlands (Dutch Top 40)	31
Netherlands (Single Top 100)	35
Switzerland (Schweizer Hitparade)	23
UK Singles (Official Charts)	6
US Album Rock Tracks (Billboard)	24
West Germany (GfK)	22
