= Sugar mice =

Traditional sugar candy popular in the United Kingdom

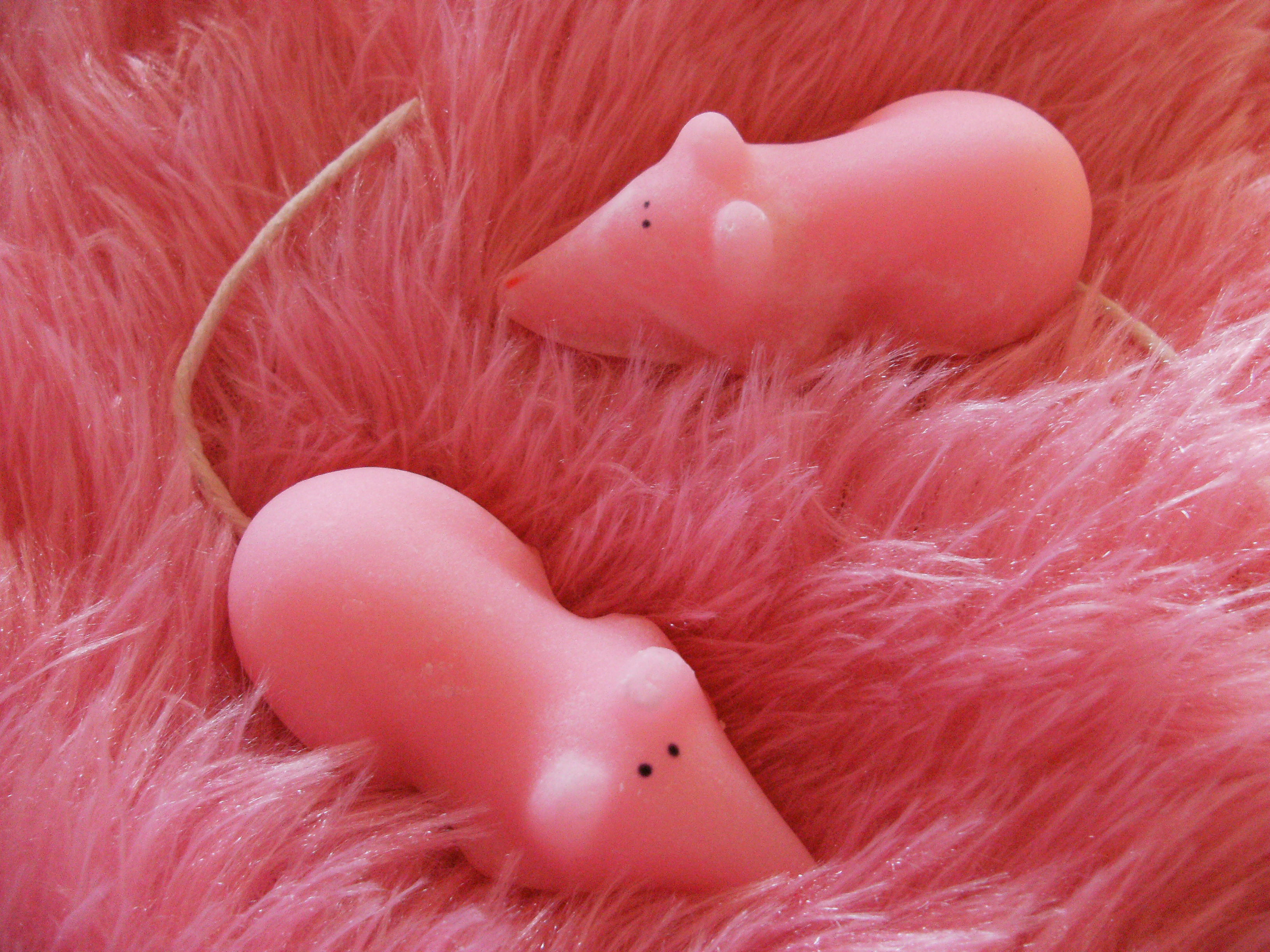
- Pink sugar mice
- Type: Confectionery
- Place of origin: United Kingdom
- Main ingredients: Sugar, flavouring, food colouring

Sugar mice are a traditional sweet popular in the United Kingdom, especially during the Christmas season. They traditionally consist of a boiled fondant formed from sugar and water. A modern non-cooked variation for children to make at home involves instead using icing sugar, egg whites and golden syrup. Various flavours and food dyes can be added. Small portions of the mass are formed into a mouse-like shape and decorated with a "tail" (traditionally cotton, although edible materials such as liquorice may be used). The mice may be decorated with faces or messages using additional fondant, icing sugar, chocolate, etc. Finally, they are left to dry for one or two days until they develop their typical, somewhat fudge-like dry and crumbly texture.
