= Spectrum (Montreal) =

- Le Spectrum de Montréal
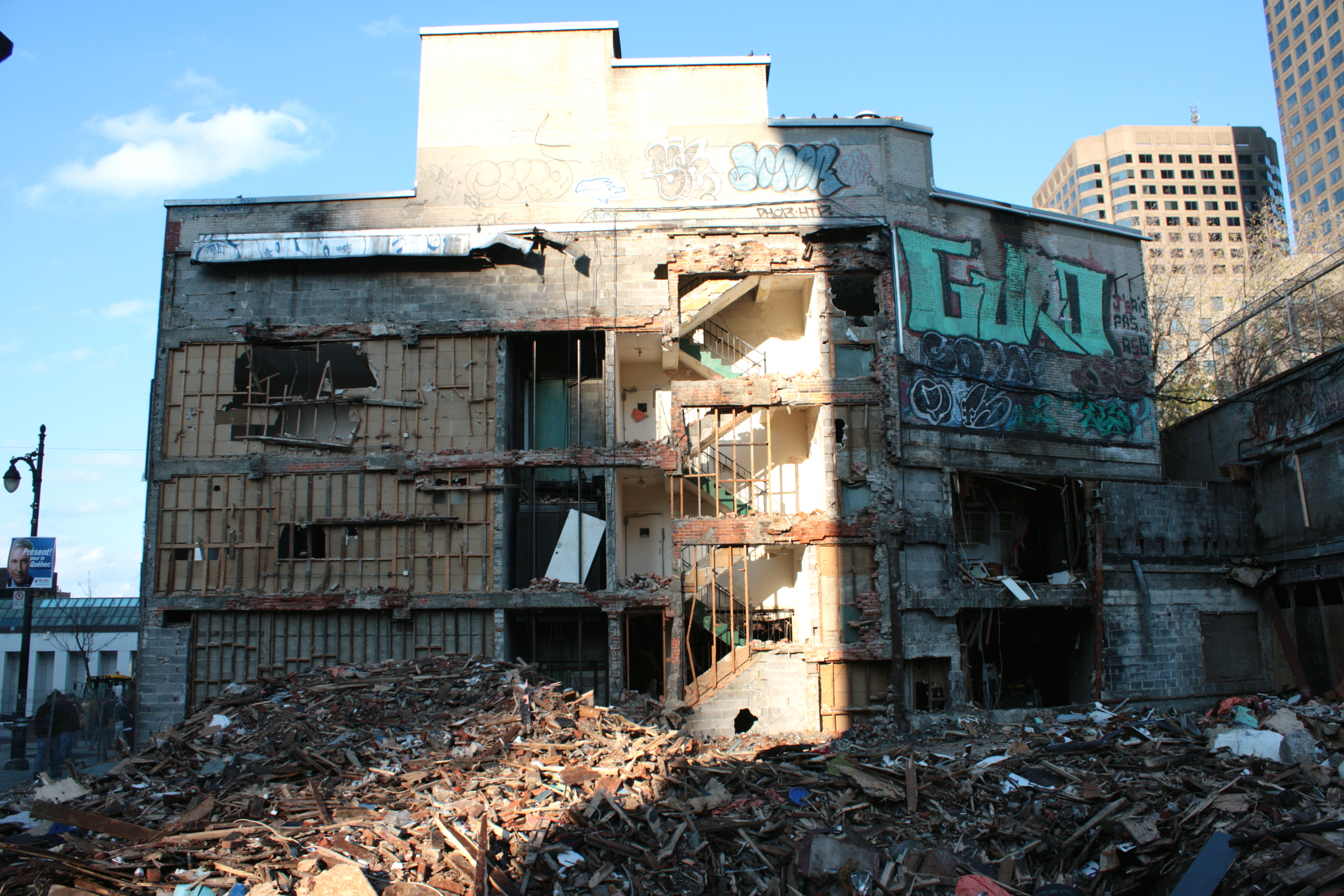
- Facade of venue during demolition (c.2008)
- Interactive map of Spectrum
- Former names: Cinéma Alouette (1952-70); Théâtre Alouette (1970-74); Théâtre Pigalle (1974-76); Cinéma Carrefour (1976-80); Club Montréal (1980-82); Spectrum (1982-2007)
- Address: 318 rue Sainte-Catherine O Montreal H2X 2A1; Canada
- Location: Downtown Montreal
- Owner: L'Équipe Spectra
- Capacity: 1,200

Construction
- Opened: 7 March 1952
- Closed: 5 August 2007
- Demolished: 8 October 2008

The Spectrum (French: Le Spectrum de Montréal) was a concert hall, in Montreal, Quebec, Canada, that closed on August 5, 2007. Opened on October 17, 1952, as the Alouette Theatre, it was briefly renamed Club Montreal before receiving its popular name.

The Spectrum had a capacity of about 1200 and had a "cabaret" setup with table service. A unique effect was the wall mounted lighting which included hundreds of small lightbulbs.

The last show was performed by Michel Rivard, the only performer to have played over one hundred concerts at the venue. The block on which the building stands was slated to be torn down and rebuilt as a combined shopping centre and office complex. The Spectrum had been owned by Équipe Spectra which owns other venues in Montreal.

On February 17, 2008, the borough of Ville Marie voted to proceed with demolition plans and on October 18, 2008, almost 56 years to the day from when it first opened, the Spectrum was torn down.
