= Punch and Judy (song) =

1984 single by Marillion

Single by Marillion

from the album Fugazi
- B-side: "Market Square Heroes", "Three Boats Down From the Candy"
- Released: 30 January 1984 (UK)
- Genre: Neo-prog
- Length: 3:18
- Label: EMI
- Songwriter(s): Dick/Kelly/Rothery/Trewavas/Mover
- Producer(s): Nick Tauber

Marillion singles chronology
"Garden Party" (1983)	"Punch and Judy" (1984)	"Assassing" (1984)

Audio sample
- Punch and Judy: file; help

"Punch and Judy" is a song by the British neo-prog band Marillion. It was the first single from their second studio album Fugazi. The lyrics of the song are about a marriage gone bad.

The single reached no. 29 on the UK Singles Chart in February 1984. This was the only single during the band's EMI years that no music video was shot for.

A CD replica of the single was also part of a collectors box-set released in July 2000, which contained Marillion's first twelve singles and was re-issued as a 3-CD set in 2009 (see The Singles '82-'88).

== B-sides ==
The B-side on all formats contained new versions of "Market Square Heroes" (originally the A-side of the band's debut single) and "Three Boats Down from the Candy" (the B-side of "Market Square Heroes"). Both versions were re-recorded with drummer John Marter (erroneously credited as 'John Martyr'), the only tracks Marillion ever recorded with him.

The only difference between the 7" and 12" versions is found in "Market Square Heroes", which is 49 seconds longer on the 12" version.

These re-recorded versions would also appear on the B'Sides Themselves compilation in 1988; "Market Square Heroes" is also on the 1997 compilation The Best of Both Worlds.

The originally planned B-side, "Emerald Lies", instead ended up on the Fugazi album.

== Track listing ==
=== 7" versions ===
==== Side 1 ====
1. "Punch & Judy" – 3:19

==== Side 2 ====
1. "Market Square Heroes" [Edited re-recorded version] – 3:56
2. "Three Boats Down From The Candy" [Re-recorded version] – 3:59

=== 12" versions ===
==== Side 1 ====
1. "Punch & Judy" – 3:19

==== Side 2 ====
1. "Market Square Heroes" [Full re-recorded version] – 4:45
2. "Three Boats Down From The Candy" [Re-recorded version] – 3:59

== Personnel ==
- Fish – vocals
- Steve Rothery - guitars
- Mark Kelly - keyboards
- Pete Trewavas - bass
- Ian Mosley - drums
