= Lady Nina =

Single by Marillion

from the album Brief Encounter
- B-side: "Heart Of Lothian"
- Released: April 1986
- Recorded: 1985
- Genre: Neo-prog
- Label: Capitol
- Songwriters: Derek Dick, Mark Kelly, Ian Mosley, Steve Rothery, Pete Trewavas,
- Producer: Chris Kimsey

Marillion singles chronology
"Heart of Lothian" (1985)	"Lady Nina" (1986)	""Welcome to the Garden Party" (Germany only)" (1986)

"Lady Nina" is a song by the British neo-prog band Marillion. First released in 1985 on the B-side to the #2 UK hit single "Kayleigh", it was the only single from the EP Brief Encounter released in the United States by Capitol Records in April 1986. A music video was also shot to promote it. While the EP climbed to #67 on the Billboard 200 album charts, "Lady Nina" did not make the Billboard Hot 100, but did reach #30 on the Mainstream Rock charts.

The song is about a prostitute. "Lady Nina" is the only Marillion song to use a drum machine throughout. The cover was designed by regular Marillion collaborator Mark Wilkinson. The third European single from the Misplaced Childhood album, "Heart of Lothian", featured as the B-side.

The regular 7" single featured an edited version of the title track with a playing time of 03:39; this version was identical to the one found on the b-side of the "Kayleigh" 7" single. No other versions were officially released. However, a 12" promo was sent out to radio stations which featured the extended version (5:45) (originally released on the 12" version of "Kayleigh") on side A and the edited version on side B. The extended version was also the one included on Brief Encounter.

"Lady Nina"
Beginning of "Lady Nina" with the characteristic sound of a drum computer, untypical for the band

Being a U.S.-only single, "Lady Nina" was not part of the collectors box-set released in July 2000 and was re-issued as a 3-CD set in 2009 (see The Singles '82–88'); however, both tracks of this single are included as they featured on the singles "Kayleigh" and "Heart of Lothian".

== Track list ==
=== Side A ===
1. "Lady Nina" 03:39 (Dick/Rothery/Kelly/Trewavas/Mosley)

=== Side B ===
1. "Heart of Lothian" 03:47 (Dick/Rothery/Kelly/Trewavas/Mosley)

== Personnel ==
- Fish – vocals
- Steve Rothery – guitars
- Mark Kelly – keyboards
- Pete Trewavas – bass
- Ian Mosley – drum machine programming
