= De Montfort Hall =

Performance venue in Leicester, England

Coordinates: 52°37′29.54″N 1°7′17.86″W

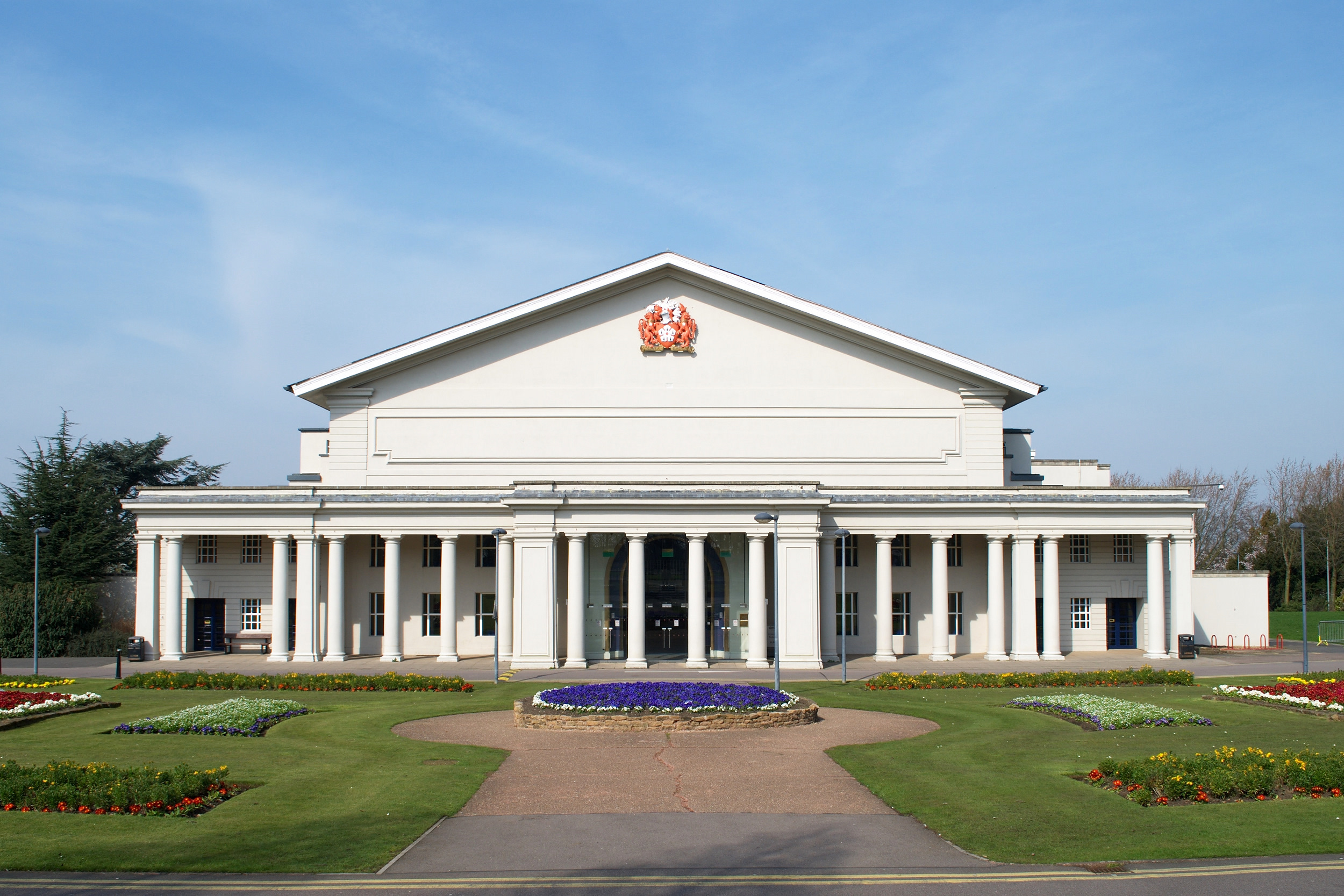
- De Montfort Hall, Leicester
- Interactive map of De Montfort Hall
- Address: Granville Road; Leicester, England; United Kingdom
- Owner: Leicester City Council
- Capacity: 400 – 2,200 (auditorium); 250 – 7,000 (amphitheater)
- Type: concert hall/auditorium
- Current use: Touring Venue

Construction
- Opened: 21 July 1913
- Years active: 113
- Architect: Shirley Harrison

Website
- http://www.demontforthall.co.uk/

De Montfort Hall is the largest music and performance venue in Leicester, England. It is situated adjacent to Victoria Park and is named after the Father of Parliament, Simon de Montfort, the 6th Earl of Leicester.

== History ==
The hall was built by the Corporation of Leicester in 1912 and 1913, and was opened to the public on 21 July 1913, at a cost of £21,000. The architect was Shirley Harrison (1876–1961), who also designed the Usher Hall in Edinburgh. He was the son of Stockdale Harrison, architect of Vaughan College.

Its indoor auditorium seating capacity is approximately 2000, and the hall contains a pipe organ believed to be the only surviving example of a large concert organ by Leicester organ builders Stephen Taylor & Son Ltd. The organ was installed in 1914. The pipe organ is a particularly fine example and comprises 6000 pipes, attracting many distinguished organists to play recitals. In 2014 the pipe organ was estimated to be worth over five million GBP.

The hall features in Richard Attenborough's film Grey Owl (1999), in a reenactment of Attenborough and his brother David's boyhood attendance at a wildlife lecture.

== Notable events ==
Most of the hall's events take place in the indoor auditorium, with shows spanning popular music, comedy, opera, ballet, world and roots music, West End musicals, classical music and a popular and traditional annual pantomime which runs from December to January. The Leicester Symphony Orchestra, started by Sir Malcolm Sargent, was established at the hall in 1922 and perform four concerts each season. The Leicester Philharmonic Choir and the Bardi Symphony Orchestra are also regular performers. With the world-famous Philharmonia Orchestra enjoying a residency at the hall since 1997.

De Montfort Hall is also the largest venue in Leicester to hold the Hindu festival of Navratri.

Events take place at the hall's spacious and scenic gardens. In recent years these have included The Big Session Festival and the Summer Sundae music festival, both ceased in 2012.

Graduation ceremonies for the University of Leicester have been taking place in the hall since 1958.

Buddy Holly and The Crickets performed at the venue in March 1958.

The Beatles played three concerts here between 1963 and 1964, at the height of Beatlemania.

Bob Dylan played at the hall on 2 May 1965 during his first tour of England.

Progressive rock group Genesis recorded the majority of their 1973 release Genesis Live at the Hall.

Family, originally from Leicester, performed their farewell concert at the Hall on October 13, 1973.

Iron Maiden performed here in 1980, 1982, 1983, 1984, 1986 and 1990.

Neo-progressive rock group Marillion recorded part of their first live album Real to Reel at De Montfort Hall, along with other live performances recorded or otherwise.

In 2011, a tribute for Sir Norman Wisdom was held at the venue, raising money for the Roy Castle Fund. The charitable event also raised funds for Grand Order of Water Rats, of which Wisdom was a member, and featured notable appearances from members Bruce Jones, Nicholas Parsons, Johnny Mans, Rick Wakeman and Jess Conrad.

Westlife lead vocalist Shane Filan played at the hall twice as a solo artist in 2014 and 2018.

Keane performed there on 25 September 2019.

== See also ==
- List of concert halls
- Little Theatre (Leicester)
