= Kayleigh =

1985 single by Marillion

Single by Marillion

from the album Misplaced Childhood
- B-side: "Lady Nina"
- Released: 7 May 1985
- Studio: Hansa Tonstudio (Berlin, Germany)
- Genre: Neo-prog
- Length: 3:33 (7-inch version); 4:04 (album version)
- Label: EMI
- Songwriters: Mark Kelly; Ian Mosley; Steve Rothery; Pete Trewavas; Fish
- Producer: Chris Kimsey

Marillion singles chronology
"Assassing" (1984)	"Kayleigh" (1985)	"Lavender" (1985)

Audio sample
- "Kayleigh": file; help

"Kayleigh" is a song by British neo-prog band Marillion. It was released as the first single from the concept album Misplaced Childhood. It is the band's most successful single in the UK, where it peaked at number two and stayed on the UK singles chart for 14 weeks. It also became the band's most successful single worldwide, reaching the top 10 in Ireland, Norway, and West Germany. In the United States, it gave the band their sole appearance on the Billboard Hot 100 chart, reaching number 74 in October 1985.

The song popularised the name Kayleigh in the UK. It was later performed by the band's lead singer, Fish, at the Nelson Mandela 70th Birthday Tribute at Wembley Stadium, with Midge Ure on guitar and Phil Collins on drums.

== Composition ==
"Kayleigh" has been characterised as a "tremulous torch song". Fish, the band's lead singer and lyricist, said that writing the lyrics was "his way of apologizing to some of the women he had dated in the past." Although he had at one point dated a woman whose forenames were Kay Lee, the song was more a composite of several women with whom he had had relationships. Fish told Classic Rock in 2014, "I'd wanted to write a song about a girlfriend I'd split up with, whose name was Kay. Which of course we couldn't do. So we added her middle name, Lee, and it became Kayleigh instead."

Fish was quoted:

I was very confused at the time, you know, I had a lot of long term relationships, a lot of 'deep and meaningful' relationships that basically I'd wrecked because I was obsessed with the career and where I wanted to go. I was very, very selfish and I just wanted to be the famous singer but I was starting to become aware of the sacrifices that I was making, and I think that Kay was one of those sacrifices that went along the road. 'Kayleigh' was not just about one person; it was about three or four different people. The 'stilettos in the snow', that was something that happened in Galashiels, when I can remember going down one night and we were both really drunk, and, you know, dancin' under a street light, and 'dawn escapes from moon-washed college halls' was part of the Cambridge thing.

According to Steve Rothery, the guitar hook line through the verse came from demonstrating to his girlfriend what effects a chorus and a delay pedal could add to a guitar's sound. Rothery recorded the song on a chorused Stratocaster guitar, using the pick and his second and third fingers to play it. The album version contained an extended guitar solo by Rothery, 27 seconds of which is edited for the single version.

On 24 October 2012, Marillion announced on Facebook that "Sad news via Fish – Kay – who inspired our song Kayleigh – has sadly died. RIP Kay."

== Release ==
"Kayleigh" entered the UK singles chart on 18 May 1985 and climbed to the number two position. It was kept from number one by a version of "You'll Never Walk Alone" by the charity supergroup the Crowd in June 1985, which was released following the Bradford City stadium fire.

As with all Marillion albums and singles of the Fish period, the cover art was designed by Mark Wilkinson from an idea by Fish. The B-side on the international version, "Lady Nina", would go on to be used as a single promoting the 1986 US-only mini album Brief Encounter. "Lady Nina" is the only Marillion song from the Fish era to use a drum machine. The US version of the single uses "Heart of Lothian" instead, another track from Misplaced Childhood that would eventually be released as the third and final single from the album. A CD replica of the single was also part of a collectors box-set released in July 2000 which contained Marillion's first 12 singles and was re-issued as a 3-CD set in 2009 (see The Singles '82–'88).

== Music video ==
The promotional video for the single was shot in West Berlin, where the Misplaced Childhood album was recorded. Tamara Nowy, a German woman who subsequently married lead singer Fish, and Simon Brown, the boy portrayed on the sleeve of the album and the single, appeared in the video.

== Legacy ==
The song's popularity in mid-1985 was responsible for a significant rise in popularity of the name Kayleigh. Its popularity and legacy was addressed by Harry Wallop, writing in The Daily Telegraph in 2011:

Some names just didn't exist a generation ago, but have taken off in popularity. The most famous of these is Kayleigh, which came into existence thanks to the neo-prog rock band Marillion, who had a number two hit with a single of this name in 1985. It was almost unheard of before the song. But since then it has taken hold, especially with parents who grew up with a love of long-haired bouffant power ballads. A few years ago, the name made it to the 30th most popular girl's name in Britain, and it remains popular: 267 children were named it last year. Curiously, though, it has spawned a bewildering sub-sect of names, nearly all of which are unrelentingly bizarre. There were 101 Demi-Leighs last year, seven Chelsea-Leighs and four called Lilleigh, which sounds like a sanitary product.

In 2012, it was announced that the Scottish Borders Council was to inscribe extracts from the song's lyrics into the pavement at the newly developed Market Square in Galashiels. Council engineer David Johnstone said the authority felt it was appropriate to mark the links between Galashiels and the song:

The lyrics from the song Kayleigh included reference to the old textiles college. Some of the lyrics referred to 'dawn escapes from moon-washed college halls' and 'do you remember cherry blossom in the market square?' There was a feeling that these lyrics were really appropriate and because of the connection between the singer and Galashiels that it would be appropriate to engrave some of those lyrics into the paving and make more of a feature of it." Johnstone also said the original cherry trees referred to in the song had been removed due to disease but they would be replaced.

In 2013, in a presentation on crowd funding for a TED conference in Bedford, Marillion keyboardist Mark Kelly identified the song's popularity as "part of the reason I've never had a proper job and I've been able to make a living from music for the past 32 years".

In a 2021 interview about Weltschmerz, which Fish described as his final album, he said that "I'm never going to be playing stadiums or arenas again. And I definitely don't want to be on the chicken-in-a-basket circuit singing fucking 'Kayleigh'."

== Track listings ==
International 7-inch version

A. "Kayleigh" – 3:33
B. "Lady Nina" – 3:41

US 7-inch version

A. "Kayleigh" – 3:33
B. "Heart of Lothian" – 3:47

12-inch versions

A1. "Kayleigh" (alternative mix) – 3:57
A2. "Kayleigh" (extended version) – 4:00
B1. "Lady Nina" (extended version) – 5:46

The Singles '82-88'

1. "Kayleigh" – 3:33
2. "Lady Nina" – 3:41
3. "Kayleigh" (alternative mix) – 3:57
4. "Kayleigh" (extended version) – 4:00
5. "Lady Nina" (extended version) – 5:46

== Personnel ==
- Fish – vocals
- Steve Rothery – guitars
- Mark Kelly – keyboards
- Pete Trewavas – bass
- Ian Mosley – drums

== Charts ==
=== Weekly charts ===
Chart (1985)	Peak position
Australia (Kent Music Report)	88
Belgium (Ultratop 50 Flanders)	38
Canada Top Singles (RPM)	76
Europe (European Hot 100 Singles)	9
Ireland (IRMA)	4
Italy (Musica e dischi)	25
Netherlands (Dutch Top 40)	16
Netherlands (Single Top 100)	12
Norway (VG-lista)	8
Switzerland (Schweizer Hitparade)	19
UK Singles (Official Charts)	2
US Billboard Hot 100	74
US Top Rock Tracks (Billboard)	14
West Germany (GfK)	7

=== Year-end charts ===
Chart (1985)	Position
Netherlands (Single Top 100)	88
UK Singles (OCC)	32
West Germany (Media Control)	39

== Certifications ==
Region	Certification	Certified units/sales
United Kingdom (BPI)	Silver	250,000^{^}
^{^} Shipments figures based on certification alone.

== See also ==
- Belsize Park (mentioned in the lyrics)
