= The Singles '82–88' =

Compilation album by Marillion
- Released: 16 October 2009
- Recorded: 1982–1987
- Genre: Neo-prog, pop rock
- Label: EMI

Marillion chronology
Less Is More (2009)	The Singles '82–88' (2009)	Sounds That Can't Be Made (2012)

The Singles '82–88' is a three-CD box set containing the first twelve singles by the British neo-prog band Marillion, all from the period they were fronted by Fish. It was released by EMI Records on 16 October 2009. The musical contents is identical to the 2000 box set of the same title, which contained 12 individually packaged CD singles in "replica" mini-slip covers, each with the original cover art by Mark Wilkinson. This set re-uses a part of Wilkinson's contribution to the 1995 compilation The Best of Both Worlds for its front cover.

All B-sides that appeared on various formats of the original singles have been included.

== Track listing ==
=== Disc 1 ===
1. Market Square Heroes
2. Three Boats Down From The Candy (1997 Digital Remaster)
3. Grendel
4. He Knows You Know (Edited 7" Version)
5. Charting The Single
6. He Knows You Know (Edited 12" Version)
7. Garden Party (Edited Version)
8. Margaret (Live Edit)
9. Garden Party
10. Charting The Single (Live At The Hammersmith Odeon 18/4/83)
11. Margaret (Live)
12. Punch and Judy (7" Version)

=== Disc 2 ===
1. Market Square Heroes (Re-recorded Version;Edit)
2. Three Boats Down From The Candy (Re-recorded Version)
3. Market Square Heroes (Re-recorded Version)
4. Assassing (7" Version)
5. Cinderella Search (7" Version)
6. Assassing
7. Cinderella Search (12" Version)
8. Kayleigh (Single Edit)
9. Lady Nina (Single Edit)
10. Kayleigh (Alternative Mix)
11. Kayleigh
12. Lady Nina
13. Lavender
14. Freaks
15. Lavender Blue
16. Heart Of Lothian
17. Chelsea Monday (Live In The Netherlands)

=== Disc 3 ===
1. Heart Of Lothian (Extended Mix)
2. Incommunicado (Edit)
3. Going Under
4. Incommunicado
5. Incommunicado (Alternative Version)
6. Sugar Mice
7. Tux On
8. Sugar Mice (Radio Edit)
9. Sugar Mice (Extended Version)
10. Warm Wet Circles (7" Remix)
11. White Russian (Live In Germany)
12. Incommunicado (Live In Germany)
13. Freaks (Live In Germany)
14. Kayleigh (Live In London)
15. Childhood's End? (Live In London)
16. White Feather (Live In London)
