= Neal Morse discography =

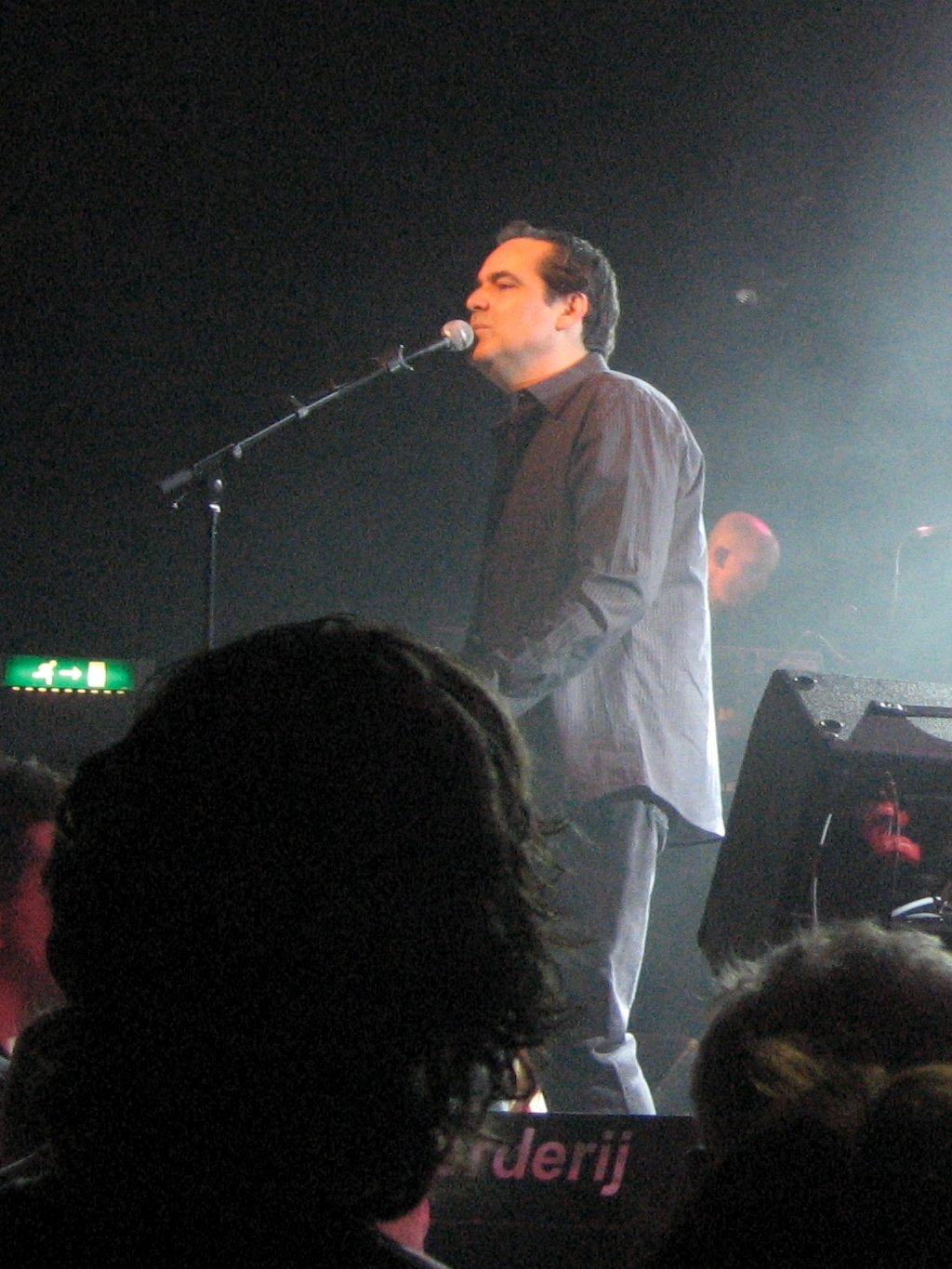
- Neal Morse performing in Zoetermeer 2007

This is the complete discography of the American progressive rock musician Neal Morse.

== Studio albums ==
=== With Spock's Beard ===
- The Light (1995)
- Beware of Darkness (1996)
- The Kindness of Strangers (1998)
- Day for Night (1999)
- V (2000)
- Snow (2002)

=== Singer-songwriter albums ===
- Neal Morse (1999)
- It's Not Too Late (2002)
- Songs from the Highway (2007)
- Songs from November (2014)
- Life & Times (2018)
- Late Bloomer (2024)
- Never Been Down This Road (2025)
- Darkness & Light (2026)

=== Prog albums ===
- Testimony (2003)
- One (2004)
- ? (2005)
- Sola Scriptura (2007)
- Lifeline (2008)
- Testimony 2 (2011)
- Momentum (2012)
- Jesus Christ the Exorcist (2019)
- Sola Gratia (2020)
- The Dreamer – Joseph: Part One (2023)
- The Restoration – Joseph: Part Two (2024)

=== Worship albums ===
- Lead Me Lord (Worship Sessions Volume 1) (2005)
- God Won't Give Up (2005)
- Send the Fire (Worship Sessions Volume 2) (2006)
- Secret Place (Worship Sessions Volume 3) (2008)
- The River (Worship Sessions Volume 4) (2009)
- Mighty to Save (Worship Sessions Volume 5) (2010)
- Get in the Boat (2013)
- To God Be the Glory (2016)
- Last Minute Christmas Album (2020)

=== With Transatlantic ===
- SMPT:e (2000)
- Bridge Across Forever (2001)
- The Whirlwind (2009)
- Kaleidoscope (2014)
- The Absolute Universe (2021)

=== With Morse, Portnoy & George ===
- Cover to Cover (2006)
- Cover 2 Cover (2012)
- Cov3r to Cov3r (2020)

=== With Flying Colors ===
- Flying Colors (2012)
- Second Nature (2014)
- Third Degree (2019)

=== With The Neal Morse Band ===
- The Grand Experiment (2015)
- The Similitude of a Dream (2016)
- The Great Adventure (2019)
- Innocence & Danger (2021)
- L.I.F.T. (2026)

=== With D'Virgilio, Morse & Jennings ===
- Troika (2022)
- Sophomore (2023)

=== With Neal Morse & The Resonance ===
- No Hill for a Climber (2024)
- River of Light (2026)

=== With Cosmic Cathedral ===
- Deep Water (2025)

=== As composer ===
- Brother Andrew (2026)

== Live albums ==
=== With Spock's Beard ===
- Official Live Bootleg/The Beard is Out There (1996)
- Live at the Whisky and NEARfest (1999)
- Nick 'n Neal live in Europe – Two Separate Gorillas (2000)
- Don't Try This at Home (2000)
- Don't Try This @ Home Either (2000)
- There & Here (2001)
- Europe '98 (2010)
- Snow Live (2017)
- Offenbach 1-Nov-98 (2019)
- Live at the Astoria - Jun 16, 2001 (2021)

=== With Transatlantic ===
- Live in America (2001)
- Live in Europe (2003)
- Whirld Tour 2010: Live in London (2010)
- More Never is Enough: Live @ Manchester & Tilburg 2010 (2011)
- KaLIVEoscope (2014)
- The Final Flight: Live At L'Olympia (2023)
- Live at Morsefest 2022: The Absolute Whirlwind (2024)

=== With Yellow Matter Custard ===
- One Night in New York City (2003)
- One More Night in New York City (2011)

=== Solo ===
- ? Live (2007)
- So Many Roads: Live in Europe (2009)
- Testimony 2: Live in Los Angeles (2011)
- Live Momentum (2013)
- Morsefest 2014: Testimony and One LIVE (2015)
- Morsefest 2015: ? and Sola Scriptura LIVE (2017)
- Live at the Downey Theater 2008 (2019)
- Winter Worship Tour 2012 (2019)
- Cal Prog 2004 (2019)
- Testimony Live 2003 (2019)
- 3 Rivers Prog Festival 2008 (2019)
- Jesus Christ: The Exorcist - Live at Morsefest 2018 (2020)
- Life & Times in Milan - June 8th, 2016 (2021)
- The Most Wonderful Time of the Year (2021)
- Morsefest 2024 (2025)

=== With Flying Colors ===
- Live in Europe (2013)
- Second Flight: Live at the Z7 (2015)
- Third Stage: Live in London (2020)
- Morsefest 2019 (2021)

=== With The Neal Morse Band ===
- Alive Again (2016)
- The Similitude of a Dream: Live in Tilburg 2017 (2018)
- Morsefest 2017: Testimony of a Dream (2018)
- The Great AdvenTour: Live in Brno 2019 (2020)
- Morsefest 2019 (2021)
- Morsefest 2021 (2022)
- Morsefest 2020 (2023)
- An Evening Of Innocence & Danger: Live in Hamburg (2023)
- Morsefest 2023 (2024)

=== With D'Virgilio, Morse & Jennings ===
- Morsefest 2024 (2025)

== Compilations and rarities ==
- Merry Christmas from the Morse Family (2000)
- The Transatlantic Demos (2003)
- Sing It High: A Collection of Singles (2007)
- One Demos (2007)
- Neal's Mystery Box (2019)
- Advent Calendar 2019 (2019)
- Inner Circle Sampler (2020)
- Hope and a Future (2020)
- Testimony Demos (2020)
- Question Mark Demos (2020)
- Sola Scriptura Demos (2020)

=== With Spock's Beard ===
- From the Vault (1997)
- The First Twenty Years (2015)
- The Demos 1995-2000 (2020)

=== With Transatlantic ===
- SMPT:e - As Mixed By Roine Stolt 1999 (2003)

=== With The Prog World Orchestra ===
- A Proggy Christmas (2012)

=== With Flying Colors ===
- True Colors (2017)

== Video albums ==
- Testimony Live (2004)
- Sola Scriptura and Beyond (2008)
- Testimony 2: Live in Los Angeles (2011)
- Live Momentum (2013)
- Morsefest 2014 (2015)
- Morsefest 2015 (2017)
- Life and Times Live (2018)
- Voices of the Beard: Storytellers 2 (2019)
- Jesus Christ: The Exorcist - Live at Morsefest 2018 (2020)
- Morsefest 2024 (2025)

=== With The Neal Morse Band ===
- Alive Again (2016)
- The Similitude of a Dream: Live in Tilburg 2017 (2018)
- Morsefest 2017: Testimony of a Dream (2018)
- The Great AdvenTour: Live in Brno 2019 (2020)
- Morsefest 2019 (2021)
- Morsefest 2021 (2022)
- Morsefest 2020 (2023)
- Morsefest 2023 (2024)

=== With Spock's Beard ===
- The Spock's Beard Home Movie (1998)
- Live at the Whisky (1999)
- Don't Try This at Home: Live in Holland / The Making of V (2002)
- The Making of Snow (2004)
- Snow Live (2017)

=== With Morse Portnoy George ===
- Making Cover 2 Cover (2012)

=== With Transatlantic ===
- Live in Europe (2003)
- Building the Bridge / Live in America (2006)
- The Official Bootleg DVD (2010)
- Whirld Tour 2010 (2010)
- More Never Is Enough: Live @ Manchester & Tilburg 2010 (2011)
- Kaliveoscope (2014)
- The Final Flight: Live At L'Olympia (2023)
- Live at Morsefest 2022: The Absolute Whirlwind (2024)

=== With Flying Colors ===
- The Making of Flying Colors (2012)
- Live in Europe (2013)
- Second Flight: Live at the Z7 (2015)
- Third Stage: Live in London (2020)
- Morsefest 2019 (2021)

=== With Yellow Matter Custard ===
- One Night in New York City (2005)
- One More Night in New York City (2011)

=== With D'Virgilio, Morse & Jennings ===
- Morsefest 2024 (2025)

== Inner Circle fan club audio releases ==
- Neal Morse – Inner Circle CD# 1 (May 2005)
- Neal Morse – Live in Berlin: Part 1 (September 2005)
- Neal Morse – Hitman (November 2005)
- Neal Morse – Whispers in the Wind (January 2006)
- Neal Morse – Neal Morse in the 80's (March 2006)
- Neal Morse – Hodgepodge (July 2006)
- Neal Morse – Let's Polka Plus Merry Christmas (November 2006)
- Neal Morse – With a Little Help From My Friends (January 2007)
- Neal Morse – Homeland (March 2007)
- Neal Morse – ? Live (May 2007)
- Neal Morse – Encores and New Songs (July 2007)
- Neal Morse – Acoustic Sunrise (November 2007)
- Neal Morse – From the Inner Circle (January 2008)
- Neal Morse – Demos and Live Stuff (March 2008)
- Neal Morse – Sola Scriptura Live (July 2008)
- Neal Morse – Starless and Other Stuff (November 2008)
- Neal Morse – Roine's Love Mix (January 2009)
- Neal Morse – Excerpts from Jesus Christ: The Exorcist (March 2009)
- Neal Morse – From the Cutting Room Floor (September 2009)
- Neal Morse – Live at All Saints (January 2010)
- Neal Morse – A Collection of Songs & Demos Recorded in the Fall of 2009 (March 2010)
- Neal Morse – Covers & Others (July 2010)
- Neal Morse – Times & Seasons (November 2010)
- Neal Morse – Testimony Live In Whittier, Set 1 (March 2011)
- Neal Morse – Testimony Live in Whittier, Set 2 & 3 (May 2011)
- Neal Morse – Neal Morse in the 80's and 90's (September 2011)
- Neal Morse – A Proggy Christmas (November 2011)
- Neal Morse – The Whirlwind Demo (January 2012)
- Neal Morse – ~~Not~~ For Flying Colors (May 2012)
- Flying Colors – Island of the Lost Keyboards: Neal's Mix (November 2012)
- Neal Morse – 5 Loaves and 3 Fishes (March 2013)
- Neal Morse – Momentum L.A. Live (May 2013)
- Neal Morse - Neal Morse in the 90's (September 2013)
- Neal Morse – Christmas 2013 (November 2013)
- Neal Morse – The Early Snow Demos (January 2014)
- Neal Morse – The Momentum Demos (May 2014)
- Neal Morse – The Transatlantic Kaleidoscope Demos, Part 1 (September 2014)
- Neal Morse – The Transatlantic Kaleidoscope Demos, Part 2 (November 2014)
- Neal Morse – More Songs from November (March 2015)
- Neal Morse – Inner Circle Concert: Morsefest 2014 (July 2015)
- Neal Morse – Acoustic Sketches (November 2015)
- The Neal Morse Band – The Grand Experiment Demos (March 2016)
- Neal Morse – Falling for Forever and the Kansas Demos (July 2016)
- Neal Morse – The Blues Sessions (November 2016)
- The Neal Morse Band – The Similitude of a Dream Demos, Part 1 (May 2017)
- Neal Morse and Friends - 2015 Morsefest Acoustic Concert (July 2017)
- Neal Morse – Testimony Two Demos (September 2017)
- Spock's Beard – Morsefest 2016: Inner Circle Jam (November 2017)
- Neal Morse – Live and Acoustic at Morsefest 2017 (January 2018)
- Neal Morse and Friends – Morsefest 2016 Storytellers, Part 1 (March 2018)
- Neal Morse and Friends – Morsefest 2016 Storytellers, Part 2 (May 2018)
- Neal Morse – Life & Times Tour: Live in NYC and a Few Other Places (July 2018)
- Neal Morse – Jesus Christ the Exorcist (September 2018)
- The Neal Morse Band – The Similitude of a Dream Demos, Part 2 (November 2018)
- The Neal Morse Band – Jan 2018 Sessions: Beginning the Adventure (May 2019)
- Neal Morse and Friends – Voices of the Beard: Storytellers 2 (July 2019)
- Flying Colors – Second Nature Roughs (September 2019)
- Neal Morse – More Songs About Coffee & My Wife (November 2019)
- Neal Morse and Friends – Morsefest 2019 Inner Circle Concert: A Year In Neal's Life (May 2020)
- The Neal Morse Band - Covers & Encores (July 2020)
- Transatlantic - Live at Wetlands Preserve - NYC 2000 (November 2020)
- Neal Morse - The Absolute Universe Demos (May 2021).
- Neal Morse - Sola Gratia: The Demos (November 2021)
- Neal Morse - The Troika Demos (May 2022)
- Neal Morse - Keys & Strings: Piano & Guitar Improvisations (November 2022)
- Spock's Beard - In the Year 2000 (January 2023)
- Neal Morse - God's Smuggler Demos (May 2023)
- The Neal Morse Band - Montreal 2015 (July 2023)
- Neal Morse - The Dreamer: Joseph Part One Demos (January 2024)
- Neal Morse - Early Bloomer (July 2024)
- Neal Morse - Another Side of Neal Morse (January 2025)
- Neal Morse and the Resonance - The Trianon - Paris, France 2025 (September 2025)
- Neal Morse - 2024/2025 Demos (November 2025)
- Cosmic Cathedral: Studio Jams (January 2026)
- Neal Morse - Palais Montcalm, Quebec - 13 Mar 2026 (March 2026)
- Neal Morse - Brother Andrew - Neal's Show Demo (May 2026)
- Neal Morse - Newcastle, UK - June 27, 2026 (July 2026)

== Inner Circle fan club video releases ==
- Neal Morse - Inner Circle DVD#1 (July 2005)
- Neal Morse - The Europe Winter 2006 Church Tour DVD (May 2006)
- Neal Morse - Question Mark & Beyond: Tour of Europe 2006 (September 2006)
- Neal Morse - Live at the Kings Centre, Chessington, London, July 8, 2006 (September 2006)
- Neal Morse - Making of Testimony (September 2007)
- Neal Morse - From the Video Vault (May 2008)
- Neal Morse and Friends - Live @ 3RP (September 2008)
- Neal Morse & Band - Lifeline Tour 2008: Zeche Bochum Germany, Part One (May 2009)
- Neal Morse & Band - Lifeline Tour 2008: Zeche Bochum Germany, Part Two (July 2009)
- Neal Morse & Band - Live at Xnoizz Flevo Festival 2009 (November 2009)
- Neal Morse - Live & Acoustic (May 2010)
- Neal Morse - Live in Seattle with Ajalon (September 2010)
- Spock's Beard - Progfest 97 (January 2011)
- Neal Morse - Testimony 2...For You (July 2011)
- Neal Morse - One Under Construction, Part One (March 2012)
- Neal Morse - One Under Construction, Part Two (July 2012)
- Neal Morse - Live: Iso Soitto (September 2012)
- Neal Morse - Acoustic/Live in Mexico City (January 2013)
- The Flower Kings & Neal Morse Band 2013 - 19 Days In Europe (July 2013)
- Neal Morse - Live in Cuijk (March 2014)
- Neal Morse Band - Live in India (July 2014)
- Neal Morse - The Making of ? (January 2015)
- The Neal Morse Band - Live in Athens (May 2015)
- Neal Morse - The Sola Scriptura Sessions (September 2015)
- The Neal Morse Band - Cruise to the Edge 2015 (January 2016)
- The Neal Morse Band - Scenes From a Prog Cruise (May 2016)
- Neal Morse - A Day in the Life (September 2016)
- Neal Morse - Commentary on a Dream, Part One (January 2017)
- Neal Morse - Commentary on a Dream, Part Two (March 2017)
- Neal Morse - Inner Circle 2015 (July 2017)
- Spock's Beard - Morsefest 2016: Inner Circle Jam (November 2017)
- Neal Morse and Friends - Morsefest 2016 Storytellers, Part 1 (March 2018)
- Neal Morse and Friends - Morsefest 2016 Storytellers, Part 2 (May 2018)
- The Neal Morse Band - Limbourg, Le Kursaai, 30-03-2017 (January 2019)
- The Neal Morse Band - The Great Adventure Commentary (March 2019)
- Spock's Beard - But Wait...There's More! (January 2019)
- Neal Morse Band - Continuing the Adventure Demos (March 2020)
- Neal Morse and Friends - Morsefest 2019 Inner Circle Concert: A Year In Neal's Life (May 2020)
- Neal Morse - Neal's RV Trip (September 2020)
- Transatlantic - Live at Sweden Rock 2014 (November 2020)
- Transatlantic - The Making of The Breath of Life (March 2021)
- Neal Morse - The Making of Lifeline (July 2021)
- The Neal Morse Band - Morsefest 2020: Cover To Cover Night Commentary (September 2021)
- Spock's Beard: Live in Bochum 1998 (January 2022)
- The Neal Morse Band: A U.S. Tour of Innocence and Danger (March 2022)
- Morse, Portnoy, Gillette, Hubauer & Friends - Live in Cancun 2022 (July 2022)
- Neal Morse and Friends - Songs From God's Smuggler: Inner Circle Concert 2022 (September 2022)
- Spock's Beard - In the Year 2000 (January 2023)
- Neal Morse - Live at Tower Records 2003 (March 2023)
- Neal Morse - The Dreamer: Joseph, Part One Commentary Video (September 2023)
- Neal Morse - Morsefest USA 2023 Inner Circle Concert (November 2023)
- Neal Morse and Friends - Morsefest Inner Circle Show – De Boerderij, Holland 2023 (March 2024)
- Neal Morse - Cruise to the Edge: Awakening The Movie (May 2024)
- Neal Morse and Friends - Morsefest Inner Circle Show – Trinity Church, Brentwood 2024 (September 2024)
- Neal Morse and Friends - Morsefest Inner Circle Show - New Life Church, TN, USA (November 2024)
- Neal Morse and Friends - Morsefest Inner Circle Show - Trinity Church, Brentwood 2025 (March 2025)
- Neal Morse and the Resonance - First Expedition - New Life Church, TN, USA 2025 (May 2025)
- Neal Morse - Live at the Cavern Club - Liverpool, UK 2025 (July 2025)

== Selected guest appearances ==
- Ayreon - Universal Migrator Part 1: The Dream Sequencer (2000)
  - Vocals on "The First Man on Earth"
- Ryo Okumoto - Coming Through (2002)
  - Vocals on "Coming Through" and songwriting
- Ajalon - On the Threshold of Eternity (2005)
  - Co-lead vocals on "On the Threshold of Eternity"
- Roine Stolt - Wallstreet Voodoo (2005)
  - Lead & background vocals on "Head Above Water", "Everyone Wants to Rule the World" & "Remember"
  - Background vocals on "The Observer" & "It's All About Money"
  - Hammond organ solo on "Head Above Water"
- Alan Morse - Four O'Clock & Hysteria (2007)
  - Keyboards, guitar, songwriting and production
- Dream Theater - Systematic Chaos (2007)
  - Spoken voice on "Repentance"
- Jordan Rudess - The Road Home (2007)
  - Vocals on "Dance on a Volcano"
- Steve Hackett - Genesis Revisited II (2012)
  - Vocals on "The Return of the Giant Hogweed"
- Affector - Harmagedon (2012)
  - Keyboard solos on "Falling Away & the Rise of the Beast"
- Spock's Beard - Brief Nocturnes and Dreamless Sleep (2013)
  - Writer of "Afterthoughts" and "Waiting for Me"
  - Guitar on "Waiting for Me"
- Spock's Beard - The First Twenty Years (2015)
  - Writer of "Falling for Forever"
  - Co-lead vocals on "Falling for Forever"
- Next to None - A Light in the Dark (2015)
  - Mellotron on "A Lonely Walk"
- Project Aegis - And The Rest Is Mystery (2020)
  - Co-lead vocals
- Alan Morse - So Many Words (2026)
  - Keyboards and vocals on "I Don't Want to Travel Time if it Takes Forever"
  - Vocals on "In The Shadow of the Sun"
