= L.I.F.T. =

L.I.F.T

Studio album by NMB
- Released: February 27, 2026
- Recorded: April 2025
- Studios: Eric Gillette home studio (Tulsa, Oklahoma) (drums and most studio work); Individual members home studios (additional work)
- Genre: Progressive rock
- Length: 70:23
- Label: InsideOut/Century Media

NMB chronology
Innocence & Danger (2021)	L.I.F.T (2026)

Neal Morse solo chronology
The Restoration – Joseph: Part Two (2024)	L.I.F.T. (2026)

Singles from L.I.F.T.
- 1. "Fully Alive" Released: December 5, 2025

L.I.F.T. is the fifth album by American progressive rock group NMB, released on February 27, 2026, via Inside Out. It is Neal Morse's fifteenth progressive rock studio album overall.

The first single, "Fully Alive", was released with a video on December 5, 2025.

The album was released as a limited edition 2CD digipak (with a bonus disc of instrumental versions), a standard CD jewelcase, gatefold 2LP vinyl and digital download. The band intended to tour in support of the album, but depended on the availability of drummer Mike Portnoy, who is once again a member of Dream Theater.

== Background and concept ==
After drummer Mike Portnoy returned to Dream Theater, they thought he wouldn't be able to perform with NMB again due to busy scheduling. In the meantime, Morse himself worked on other projects, including Cosmic Cathedral and The Resonance. When the band reunited in 2024 to perform Testimony and Testimony 2 at Morsefest, Portnoy expressed a wish to work with them again as soon as he were available. That happened in April 2025, which is when they recorded the songs over 9 days. Due to guitarist Eric Gillette's wife pregnancy, the group for the first time recorded an album in his home studio in Tulsa, Oklahoma, instead of Morse's in Nashville, Tennessee. Members did, however, work on their own home studios to finalize the tracks.

Neal Morse compared the album to the group's second LP, The Similitude of a Dream, and described the effort's overall theme as "really about belonging. You start out feeling like you belong with your parents, then you break from them and you might not feel like you really belong in the world. It talks about reaching for God or a higher power or however you want to put it, and God bringing us back to wholeness." He also said it is "in a way" about his life.

Regarding the title, Morse explained that he came up with the idea of naming the album with an unexplained acronym, and that the word "L.I.F.T." felt positive and received the periods to make it mysterious.

== Critical reception ==
Professional ratings
Review scores
Source	Rating
Plattentests.de	7/10
Metal hammer (Germany)	5/7
Powermetal.de	9.00
Rock Hard	8.5
Sonic Perspectives	9.1/10

Plattentests.de's André Schuder commented that Morse may sound repetitive and that "it is abundantly clear that Morse will not rest until even the very last person has been converted to the realization that love and God—or the love of God—are both the path and the destination", but that "what the veteran master and his colleagues [...] deliver time and again is usually quite compelling." He pondered that the album "is not a standout, landmark release within the Neal Morse catalog; yet, thanks to its top-notch instrumentation and vocals, it offers a thoroughly successful journey".

Zachary Nathanson, from Echoes and Dust, described the album as "more than just a religious experience, it is powerful, emotional, and raw that Neal pours his heart and soul into the album. Once he hits those notes, you can't let them go, it stays with you forever. [...] L.I.F.T. may not be everyone's cup of tea per se, but it's quite the ride Neal has given us the ride of a lifetime".

Writing for the German edition of Metal Hammer, Frank Thießies said the band "once again deliver melodically inspired, grand-scale prog rock with subtle echoes of musical theater" and conceded that, while not reaching the level of The Similitude of a Dream, "it effortlessly offers the receptive listener a fresh and uplifting progressive rock experience".

In a 8.5 review for Rock Hard, Simon Bauer called the album a "particularly magnificent achievement" and "a fantastic record", compared it to Dream Theater's Six Degrees of Inner Turbulence, but refrained from giving it a higher score due to what he saw as Morse "succumbing" to "the temptation of leaning heavily back into the pious gospel pomp of his prog-rock musical "Jesus Christ the Exorcist" during the second half".

On Sonic Perspectives, Scott Medina commented that the album continues Morse's trademark sounds so "the audience who enjoys what Morse does [...] has a good idea of what to expect, and it's merely a question of 'what degree of awesomeness does this album deliver?' Other listeners who don’t dig Morse's approach [...] probably aren't going to be won over by this album any more than the past several." When commenting on the lyrical matter, he said that "the Christian identity is very much present, with references being to Father rather than Jesus, but not as overt as Morse's other recent albums, and he also mixes in some elemental imagery like wind and skies, along with plenty of love. But there's clearly a more psychological element present here as well, with some of the song's lyrical inspirations coming from therapy phrases." He said "these lines go over the edge a bit" sometimes and speculated that Morse could be "aiming for a cathartic experience of the human condition".

At Powermetal.de, Peter Kubaschk said that "musically, *L.I.F.T.* is essentially what one would expect from The Neal Morse Band: expansive, melodic progressive rock—often featuring vocal harmonies—that is consistently positive in tone". He concluded by saying that he "would certainly rank it ahead of "The Great Experiment" [sic] and arguably "Innocence & Danger." Ultimately, though, that is a secondary matter, as Neal Morse fans can't go wrong here anyway. A fantastic work."

== Track listing ==
L.I.F.T. track listing
No.	Title	Length
1.	"Beginning"	6:48
2.	"Fully Alive"	5:02
3.	"I Still Belong"	3:32
4.	"Gravity's Grip"	2:03
5.	"Hurt People"	8:05
6.	"The Great Withdrawal"	5:08
7.	"Contemplation"	2:20
8.	"Shame About My Shame"	5:50
9.	"Reaching"	7:32
10.	"Carry You Again"	5:02
11.	"Shattered Barricade"	1:25
12.	"Fully Alive, Pt. 2"	6:18
13.	"Love All Along"	11:18
Total length:		70:23

== Charts ==
Chart (2021)	Peak position
Austrian Albums (Ö3 Austria)	58
Belgian Albums (Ultratop Flanders)	171
Belgian Albums (Ultratop Wallonia)	73
German Albums (Offizielle Top 100)	36
French Albums (SNEP)	183
Dutch Albums (Album Top 100)	66
Scottish Albums (Official Charts)	25
Swiss Albums (Schweizer Hitparade)	13
UK Albums Sales (OCC)	26
UK Rock & Metal Albums (Official Charts)	3

== Personnel ==
NMB

- Neal Morse — vocals, keyboards, guitars
- Eric Gillette — guitars, vocals
- Bill Hubauer — keyboards, vocals
- Mike Portnoy — drums, vocals
- Randy George — bass

Additional musicians

- Amy Pippin, Julie Harrison — backing vocals on "The Great Withdrawal"

Technical personal

- Rich Mouser — mixing
- Jerry Guidroz — engineering
- Thomas Ewerhard — artwork
