= Blue Thunder (disambiguation) =

Blue Thunder is a 1983 film that features a high-tech helicopter of the same name.

Blue Thunder may also refer to:

- Blue Thunder (2015 film), a 2015 short film
- Blue Thunder (drumline), a drumline performing for the Seattle Seahawks football team
- Blue Thunder (helicopter), the titular helicopter of the film and TV series
- A nickname for No. 658 Squadron AAC and their helicopters in the United Kingdom
- Blue Thunder (truck), a monster truck currently racing in the USHRA Monster Jam series
- Blue Thunder (TV series), a 1984 TV series follow-up to the film
- McKinney Blue Thunder, a former baseball team in McKinney, Texas
- "Blue Thunder", a 1989 song by Galaxie 500 from On Fire
