= Eric Gillette =

American male guitarist

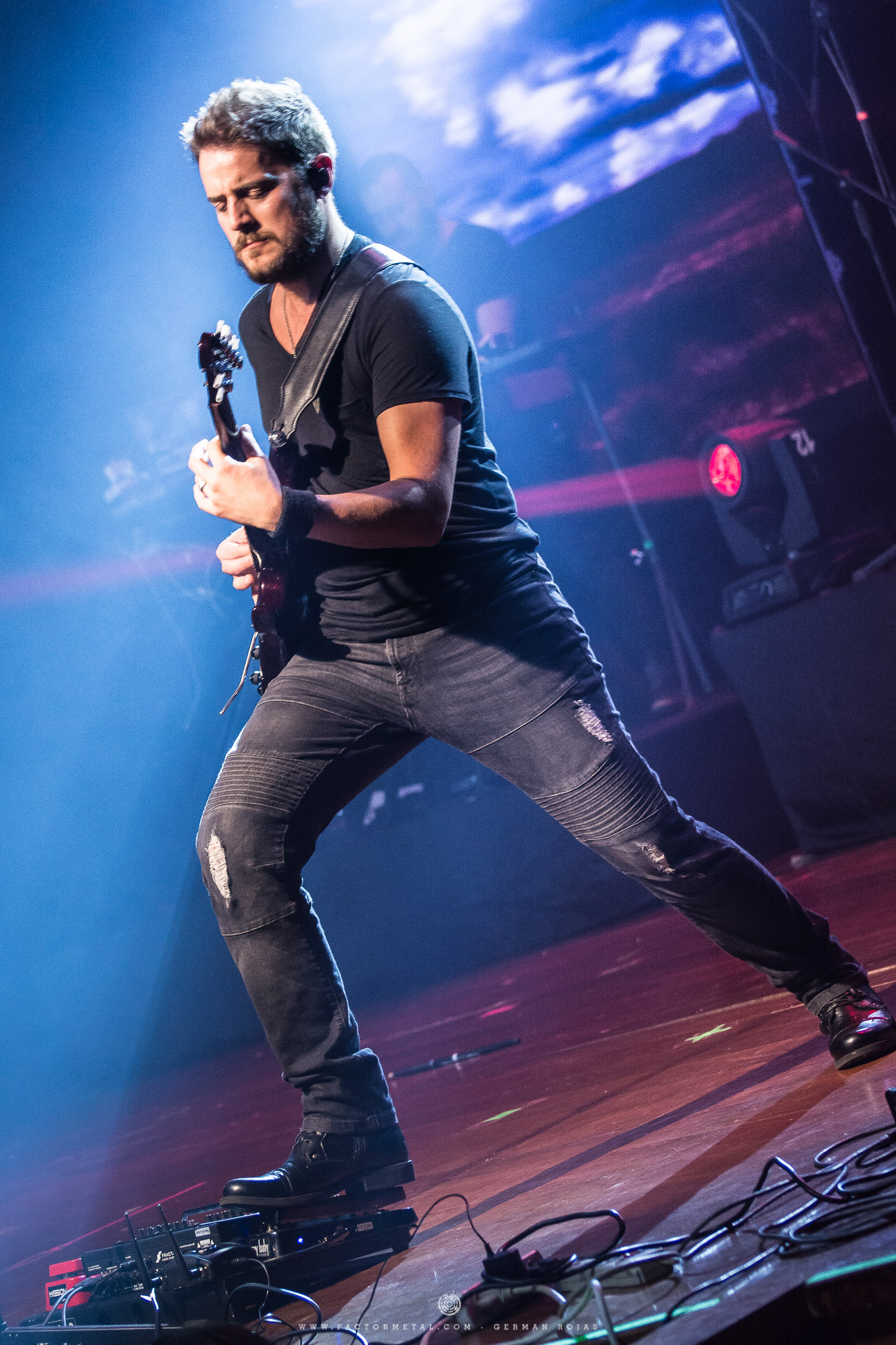
- Gillette performing with Mike Portnoy's Shattered Fortress in 2017

Background information
- Born: August 14, 1984 (age 42)
- Genre: Progressive rock
- Instruments: Guitar, keyboards, vocals, drums
- Years active: 2010–present
- Member of: The Neal Morse Band, TEMIC
- Formerly of: The Swon Brothers
- Website: www.ericgillettemusic.com

Eric Gillette (born August 14, 1984) is an American multi-instrumentalist from Oklahoma. He is the lead guitarist and vocalist for the Neal Morse Band, lead guitarist for TEMIC, as well as a solo artist and session musician. Although primarily a guitarist, he often plays keyboards and drums as part of his professional work.

== Biography ==
Gillette began taking piano lessons as a child and learned to play the guitar as a teenager. His father and aunt taught him chords, and he spent time jamming with his aunt's bluegrass band. In 2010, he began playing guitar and providing background vocals for The Swon Brothers, three years before their appearance on The Voice. He went on to play electric guitar for their album The Swon Brothers. He married his wife, Jaci Lynn, on October 10, 2014, about a year after they met at a Swon Brothers show.

Gillette's musical influences include Steve Vai, Joe Satriani, John Petrucci, and Eric Johnson. He is also a fan of and inspired by Dream Theater drummer Mike Portnoy.

In April 2012, Gillette auditioned to play guitar, keyboards, and vocals for The Neal Morse Band. After winning one of the two guitar slots in the band, he served as a guest vocalist on Morse's 2012 album Momentum and played on that album's world tour. Gillette contributed guitars, vocals, and songwriting to the first Neal Morse Band album, The Grand Experiment, in 2015, and its second, 2016's The Similitude of a Dream. That album was awarded Album of the Year 2016 by The Prog Report, which applauded "the talents of guitar virtuoso Eric Gillette."

Gillette has been active as a solo artist. In 2013, he released his first solo album, Afterthought, playing all instruments with guest appearances by Neal Morse Band mates Randy George and Bill Hubauer on bass and synthesizers, respectively. His second solo album, The Great Unknown, was released in May 2016 and includes drummer Thomas Lang and Haken band members Conner Green and Diego Tejeida on bass and keys.

In 2017, Gillette was invited by drummer and Neal Morse Band colleague Mike Portnoy to be the lead guitarist for his series of "Shattered Fortress" shows, which included the first complete live performances of Dream Theater's Twelve-step Suite. He also joined Portnoy for a series of Liquid Tension Experiment sets, featuring himself on guitar and Diego Tejeida from Haken. Also that year, Gillette worked with the Tree of Life Project, providing drums, keyboards, and mixing for its first album, Awakening Call.

In 2023, Gillette formed the new progressive metal band, TEMIC, with keyboardist Diego Tejeida and released their debut album Terror Management Theory.

== Discography ==
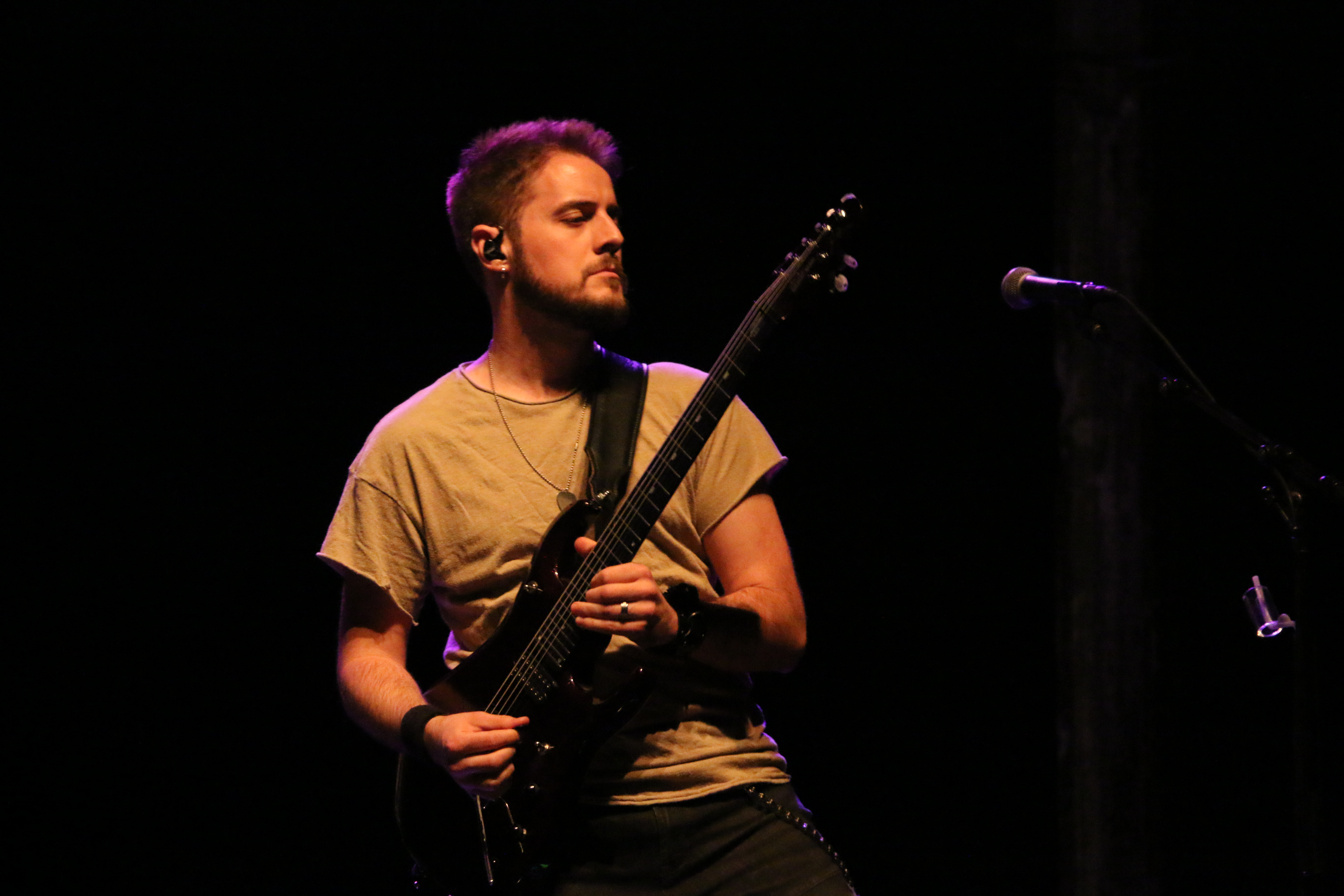
Gilette performing with the Neal Morse Band in 2017

=== Solo ===
- Afterthought (Feb. 18, 2013; self-released)
- The Great Unknown (Jun. 2, 2016; self-released)
- Sensory Overload (Jun. 17, 2024; self-released)

=== With Neal Morse ===
- Momentum (2012) – additional vocals on "Thoughts Part 5"
- Live Momentum (2013) – vocals, electric guitar, keyboards
- Morsefest 2014 (2015) – vocals, electric guitar
- Jesus Christ the Exorcist (2019) – drums, electric guitar
- Sola Gratia (2020)
- Jesus Christ: The Exorcist - Live at Morsefest 2018 (2020)
- The Dreamer – Joseph: Part One (2023) – drums, electric guitar
- The Restoration – Joseph: Part Two (2024) – drums, electric guitar

=== With The Neal Morse Band ===
- The Grand Experiment (2015) – vocals, electric guitar, songwriting
- The Similitude of a Dream (2016) – vocals, electric guitar, songwriting
- Alive Again (2016)
- Morsefest 2015 (2017) – vocals, electric guitar
- The Similitude of a Dream: Live in Tilburg 2017 (2018)
- Morsefest 2017: Testimony of a Dream (2018)
- The Great Adventure (2019) – vocals, electric guitar, songwriting
- The Great AdvenTour: Live in Brno 2019 (2020)
- Innocence & Danger (2021) - vocals, electric guitar, songwriting
- Morsefest 2019 (2021)
- Morsefest 2021 (2022)
- Morsefest 2020 (2023)
- Morsefest 2023 (2024)
- L.I.F.T. (2026) - vocals, electric guitar, songwriting

=== With The Swon Brothers ===
- The Swon Brothers (2014) – electric guitar

=== With Tree of life ===
- Awakening Call (2017) – drums, keyboards

=== With Lazleitt ===
- On the Brink (2018) – lead guitar, mixing & mastering
- Perpetually Under Idle Grounds (2019) – drums, lead guitar, mixing & mastering

=== With Patema ===
- Fathom (2019) – Mixing & mastering

=== Light Freedom Revival ===
- Kreadelteia (2020) - Lead guitar, vocals

=== With J.R.B Symphony ===
- Inception (2022) - Vocals, Keyboards and mixing

=== With TEMIC ===
- Terror Management Theory (2023)
- Ceiba (2026)
