= Innocence & Danger =

Studio album by The Neal Morse Band
- Released: August 27, 2021
- Recorded: Early 2021
- Genres: Progressive rock, progressive metal
- Length: 99:40
- Label: Inside Out/Sony Music
- Producer: NMB

The Neal Morse Band chronology
The Great Adventure (2019)	Innocence & Danger (2021)	L.I.F.T. (2026)

Neal Morse solo chronology
Sola Gratia (2020)	Innocence & Danger (2021)	The Dreamer – Joseph: Part One (2023)

Singles from Innocence & Danger
- 1. "Do It All Again" Released: June 21, 2021; 2. "Bird on a Wire" Released: July 27, 2021; 3. "Your Place in the Sun" Released: August 18, 2021

Innocence & Danger is the fourth album by American progressive rock group The Neal Morse Band (now stylized as "NMB"), released on August 27, 2021. It is Morse's twelfth progressive rock studio album overall.

It is their first non-concept album following The Similitude of a Dream (2016) and The Great Adventure (2019), both inspired by John Bunyan's The Pilgrim's Progress. The album was recorded over a week in the beginning of 2021 and for the first time Morse did not bring any demos with his ideas to the studio.

In support of the album, the band embarked on a 2022 tour around the United States and Europe.

The first single, "Do It All Again", was released with a video on June 21, 2021. It was the first song to be written for the album and serves as its opener. "Bird on a Wire", the second song on the track list and the second one to be written, was also released as a single, on July 27. "Your Place in the Sun" came as the third single and video on August 18, being the third song they wrote.

The album was released as standard digital and physical editions; a limited Digipak including both discs and a Making of DVD; and a boxset including three LPs and two CDs.

== Song information ==
"Do It All Again" was the first song written for the album. It was created around a partial demo recorded by keyboardist/vocalist Bill Hubauer. The song features three singers sharing lead vocals, with Morse singing the verses, Hubauer singing the B-section and guitarist Eric Gillette leading the chorus.

"Bird on a Wire" combines an intro by Gillette, verses by bassist Randy George and a chorus by Hubauer. Once again, three singers share lead vocals, with Morse singing the verses, Hubauer singing the bridge and Gillette singing the chorus.

"Your Place in the Sun" was built around a demo by George and features all four singers sharing vocal duties. "The Way It Had to Be" was originally a demo of The Great Adventure, but it never made it to the final track list. It was then recovered for this album after the band realized they had too much material for a single disc, but still not enough for a double release, so they decided to add a few more tracks, this one included. Strongly influenced by Pink Floyd, this track was supposed to segue into "The Great Despair" (from The Great Adventure).

"Emergence" is a solo acoustic guitar piece performed by Morse alone. According to drummer/vocalist Mike Portnoy, when they decided to make a double album, Morse suggested they did something similar to Yes's Fragile, in which each member got a solo track. The idea was later left aside, but Morse did keep his song, which is used as a lead-in to the following track, "Not Afraid, Pt 1". Both "Not Afraid" songs are lyrically, but not instrumentally connected.

The cover of duo Simon & Garfunkel's "Bridge over Troubled Water" was another idea they had to fill in the album's remaining space. Yes's version of "America" (by the same duo) was an inspiration for their version.

The second disc, Danger, starts with the 20-minute epic "Not Afraid, Pt 2", which was mostly conceived and sung by Morse. The band improvised the jam session in the middle. The second track, "Beyond the Years", an even longer epic, was developed around an idea by Hubauer.

== Track listing ==
All music is written, arranged and produced by NMB (except "Emergence", written by Neal Morse and "Bridge over Troubled Water" written by Paul Simon and arranged by NMB)

CD 1 (Innocence)
No.	Title	Length
1.	"Do It All Again"	8:55
2.	"Bird on a Wire"	7:22
3.	"Your Place in the Sun"	4:12
4.	"Another Story to Tell"	4:50
5.	"The Way It Had to Be"	7:14
6.	"Emergence"	3:12
7.	"Not Afraid Pt. 1"	4:53
8.	"Bridge over Troubled Water" (music: Paul Simon)	8:08
Total length:		48:46

CD 2 (Danger)
No.	Title	Length
1.	"Not Afraid Pt. 2"	19:32
2.	"Beyond the Years"	31:22
Total length:		50:54

== Reception ==
=== Critical reception ===
Professional ratings
Review scores
Source	Rating
Prog Radio	5/5 stars
laut.de	4/5 stars
Dangerdog Music Reviews	4.5/5
RAMzine	5/5 stars
Sonic Perspectives	9.5/10
Classic Rock	4/5 stars

Yan Vogel from laut.de defined the eight songs that make up the first CD as "rather short exhibits, each with different stylistic expressions". He picked the opener "Do It All Again" as an example of the band's group spirit, in that three members share the lead vocals. When comparing the two songs of the second CD, however, he thought "Not Afraid Pt. 2" was "excessively long", but praised "Beyond the Years" as the album's highlight.

Dangerdog's Craig Hartranft concluded that "with Innocence & Danger, NMB (the band formerly known as the Neal Morse Band) delivers another terrific, dramatic, and creative album of melodic progressive with plenty of twists, turns, and superb guitar work."

Writing for RAMzine, Laurence Todd praised the songs and congratulated Morse for the "consistent run of creativity" that he's been displaying since 2015, when he started a streak of several albums with NMB, Flying Colors, Transatlantic and his solo career.

Writing for her website Proghurst, Grace Hayhurst said that "in conclusion, it's easy to call this yet another Neal Morse album – because it does follow a long list of his similar tropes, compositional techniques, collaborators, and harmonic ideas. However as always, the musicianship is unbelievable, and the music is full of memorable moments."

On Sonic Perspectives, Scott Medina noted the album's lyrics as rather "secular" and the fact that for the first time Morse arrived in the studio without any demoed ideas. He was unsure if placing the two longest tracks together on the same disc was the best decision and noted that "Bridge over Troubled Water" and "Not Afraid, Pt 2" had very similar endings (combining "symphonic fanfare" with Portnoy's drum rolls), but concluded that "with 'Innocence & Danger' they have delivered something for everyone and perhaps even nudged the bar a little higher".

Classic Rock's Rich Davenport commented that "tapping into the genre's early sense of musical adventure, without the stale indulgence of the mid-70s, [NMB's] latest album Innocence & Danger contrasts epics and concise tracks."

Writing for Prog, Gary MacKenzie also noted the limited presence of religious messages in the album and said "Innocence & Danger adds to his [Morse's] enviable high quality catalogue, but it would be wrong to ignore the contributions of his bandmates here. There are some twists and turns that move beyond the expected Morse formulae and, [...] Innocence & Danger [...] certainly delivers those big themes, mellifluous vocal lines, instrumental gorgeousness and more one has come to expect from this accomplished band."

=== Commercial reception ===
==== Charts ====
Chart (2021)	Peak position
Belgian Albums (Ultratop Flanders)	187
Belgian Albums (Ultratop Wallonia)	63
Dutch Albums (Album Top 100)	18
Scottish Albums (Official Charts)	26
Swiss Albums (Schweizer Hitparade)	5
UK Albums Sales (OCC)	26
UK Christian & Gospel Albums (Official Charts)	2
UK Progressive Albums (Official Charts)	7
UK Rock & Metal Albums (Official Charts)	4

== Personnel ==
NMB

- Neal Morse — keyboards, guitars, vocals
- Mike Portnoy — drums, percussion, vocals
- Randy George — fretted and fretless bass
- Bill Hubauer — piano, organ, synthesizers, vocals
- Eric Gillette — guitars, vocals

Additional musicians

- Josee Weyland — violin
- Gideon Klein — viola, cello, string bass
- Amy Pippin, Julie Harrison, April Zachary — background vocals on "Bridge over Troubled Water"

Technical personal

- NMB — arrangement, production
- Rich Mouser — mixing, mastering
- Jerry Guidroz — drums engineering
- Thomas Cucé — additional engineering
- Bouchra Azizy — additional digital editing
- Thomas Ewerhard — artwork
- John Zocco — photography

== Awards and recognition ==
The album was honored as "Album of the Year" for 2021 by ProgCharts.com.
