= Momentum (Neal Morse album) =

Studio album by Neal Morse
- Released: September 11, 2012
- Recorded: 2012
- Studio: The Morse House (Nashville)
- Genre: Progressive rock
- Length: 61:17
- Labels: Metal Blade; Radiant Records
- Producer: Neal Morse

Neal Morse chronology
Testimony 2 (2011)	Momentum (2012)	Songs From November (2014)

Professional ratings
Review scores
Source	Rating
Prog Magazine	4/5 stars
Sputnik Music	4.0/5 stars

Momentum is the ninth progressive rock album by Neal Morse, released in September 2012. The album features Mike Portnoy on drums and Randy George on bass. The title track "Momentum" was released in late July 2012, along with a music video. Guests include Eric Gillette and Bill Hubauer who would later found the Neal Morse Band with Morse, Portnoy and George.

"Thoughts" is the fifth part of a cross-album suite, with other parts being featured on the Spock's Beard albums Beware of Darkness and V. "Afterthoughts", the third part of the cycle, was released on Spock's Beard's 2013 album Brief Nocturnes and Dreamless Sleep. The fourth part of the cycle, Afourthoughts, was released on Spock's Beard's 2025 album The Archaeoptimist.

== Track listing ==
No.	Title	Length
1.	"Momentum"	6:25
2.	"Thoughts (Part 5)"	7:51
3.	"Smoke and Mirrors"	4:38
4.	"Weathering Sky"	4:15
5.	"Freak"	4:29
6.	"World Without End"; I. "Introduction"; II. "Never Pass Away"; III. "Losing Your Soul"; IV. "The Mystery"; V. "Some Kind of Yesterday; VI. "Never Pass Away (Reprise)"	33:39

== Personnel ==
Musicians

- Neal Morse – guitar, keyboards, lead vocals
- Mike Portnoy – drums
- Randy George – bass
- Eric Gillette – vocals
- Bill Hubauer - clarinet, guitar, and keyboard solo in "World Without End"
- Adson Sodré – guitar solos on "World Without End"
- Rick Altizer – vocals
- Chris Carmichael – strings
- Paul Gilbert – guitar solo on "Momentum"
- Wil Morse – vocals

Production

- Thomas Ewerhard – artwork
- Jerry Guidroz – drum engineering
- Chad Hoerner – video director
- Ken Love – mastering
- Man In the Mountain – artwork, cover art
- Neal Morse – liner notes, producer
- Rich Mouser – mixing
- Joey Pippin – band photo

== Charts ==
Chart (2012)	Peak position
Belgian Albums (Ultratop Wallonia)	165
Dutch Albums (Album Top 100)	51
French Albums (SNEP)	166
German Albums (Offizielle Top 100)	56
Swedish Albums (Sverigetopplistan)	44
US Heatseekers Albums (Billboard)	44
US Top Christian Albums (Billboard)	36
