= Mike Portnoy =

American drummer (born 1967)

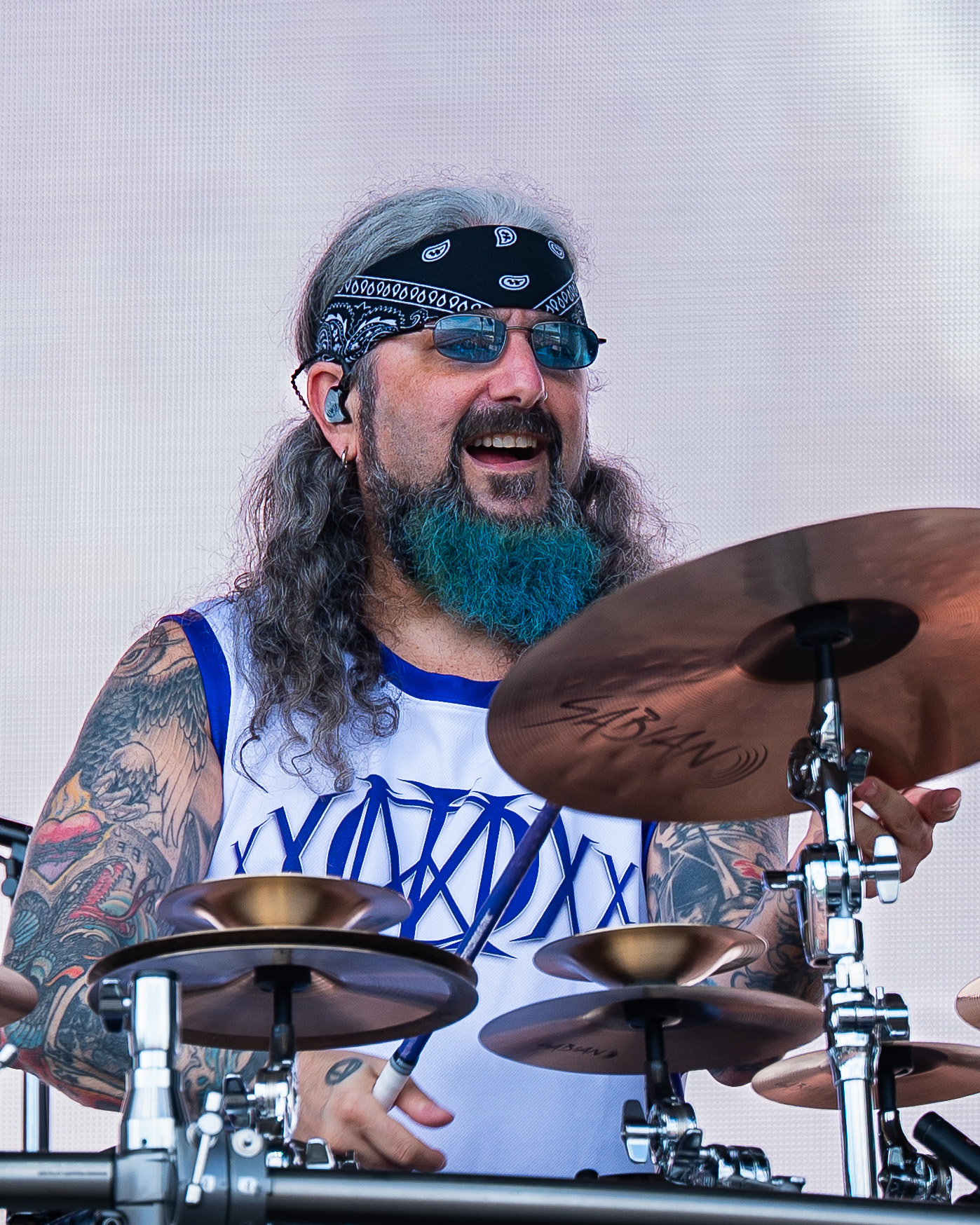
- Portnoy performing with Dream Theater in 2025

Background information
- Also known as: MP
- Born: Michael Stephen Portnoy; April 20, 1967 (age 59); Long Beach, New York, U.S.
- Genres: Progressive metal; heavy metal; progressive rock; hard rock; blues rock
- Occupation: Musician
- Instruments: Drums; vocals
- Years active: 1984–present
- Member of: Dream Theater; The Neal Morse Band; Liquid Tension Experiment; Flying Colors; The Winery Dogs; Metal Allegiance; BPMD; Noturnall
- Formerly of: Avenged Sevenfold; Cygnus and the Sea Monsters; Yellow Matter Custard; OSI; Adrenaline Mob; Transatlantic; Sons of Apollo
- Website: mikeportnoy.com

Michael Stephen Portnoy (born April 20, 1967) is an American musician best known as the drummer, backing vocalist, and co-founder of the progressive metal band Dream Theater.

In September 2010, Portnoy announced his departure from Dream Theater after 25 years, with Mike Mangini succeeding him as the band's drummer. In October 2023, 13 years after his departure, the band announced his return. Both before and during his time away from Dream Theater, Portnoy remained active with a variety of bands and projects, including Adrenaline Mob, Avenged Sevenfold, Transatlantic, Yellow Matter Custard, Flying Colors, the Winery Dogs, Liquid Tension Experiment, Metal Allegiance, Sons of Apollo, the Neal Morse Band, and BPMD.

== Early life ==
Portnoy was born on April 20, 1967, in Long Beach, New York. He is Jewish. His father, Howard Portnoy (1940–2009), worked as a DJ at a local radio station. Mike and his father later moved to Carmel-by-the-Sea, California, to work at KRML radio station after watching the 1971 film Play Misty for Me. His mother, Andrea Leone, died on the night of November 16, 1984, aged 40, when the private Piper PA-28 Cherokee plane she was aboard with her boyfriend and two other persons, on a flight from Farmingdale Airport, crashed off the Atlantic City coastline. The plane's pilot was reportedly incapacitated after suffering a heart attack when preparing to land at Atlantic City Airport.

His grandfather bought him his first drum kit when he was 11 years old. His father's job as a DJ helped Portnoy develop an appreciation for music at an early age, as he had access to his father's collection of LPs. He grew to favor bands such as Rush, Kiss, Queen, Led Zeppelin, the Who, Iron Maiden, and the Beatles, among others.

Portnoy is mainly self-taught as a drummer, though he took music theory classes in high school. During that time, he began playing in local bands. With Rising Power and Inner Sanctum, he recorded and released independent albums.

== Career ==
=== Dream Theater: 1985–2010, 2023–present ===
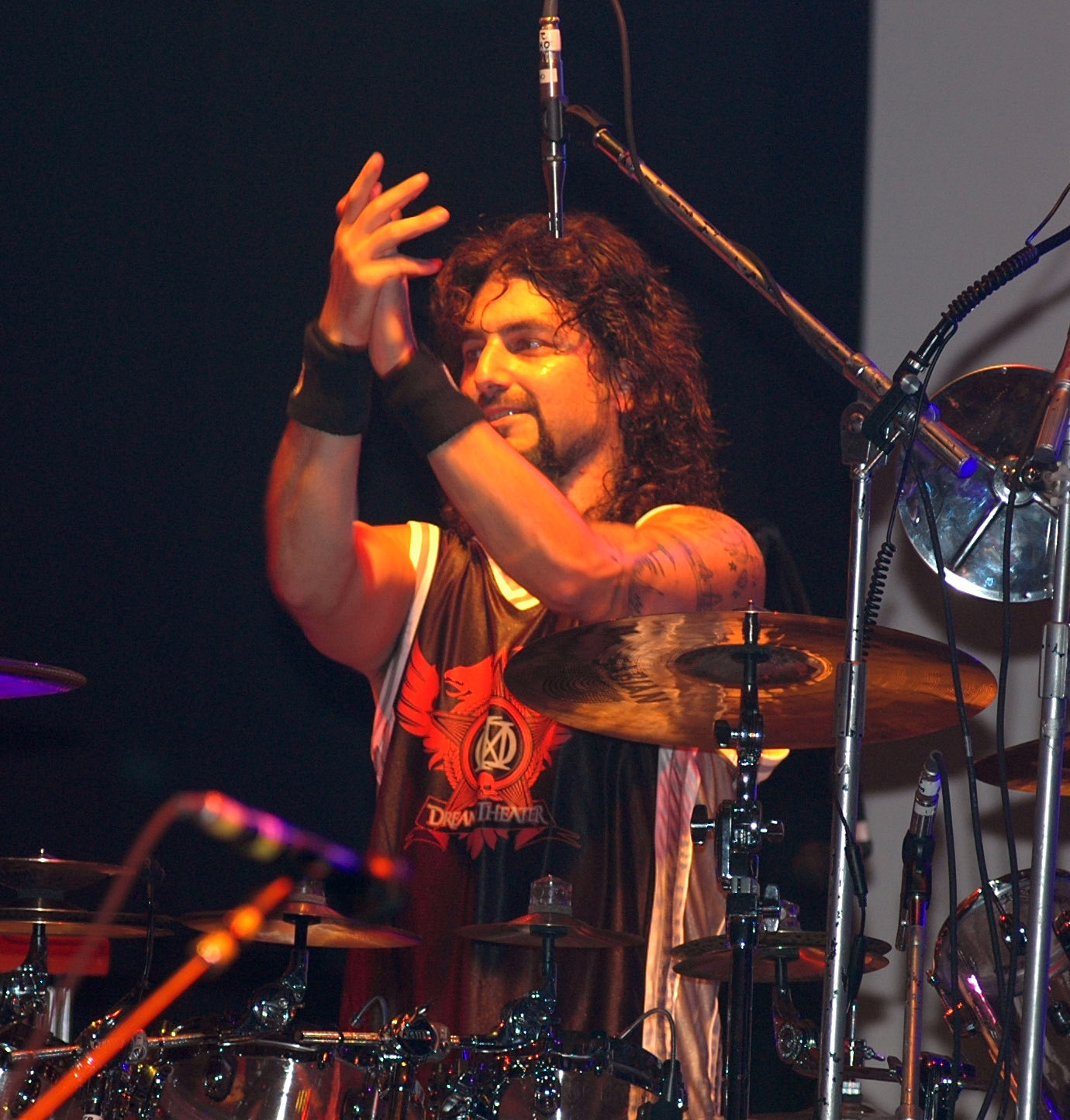
Portnoy performing with Dream Theater in August 2007

Portnoy left Inner Sanctum, his last high school band, after receiving a scholarship to attend the Berklee College of Music in Boston. There, he met John Petrucci and John Myung. They formed a band called Majesty, which was later renamed Dream Theater. Soon after, they all left Berklee.

Known for his technical skill as a drummer in Dream Theater, Portnoy has won 32 awards from Modern Drummer magazine. He is the second-youngest person (after Neil Peart) to be inducted into the Modern Drummer Hall of Fame, at 37 years of age. He was one of the main songwriters during his first tenure with Dream Theater and co-produced six of their albums with guitarist John Petrucci, from Metropolis Pt. 2: Scenes from a Memory through Black Clouds and Silver Linings.

During his time in Dream Theater, Portnoy played a key role in archiving and releasing rare Dream Theater music to fans through the YtseJam Records label. Known as "Official Bootleg" releases, these were divided into four categories: Covers Series, Demo Series, Live Series, and Studio Series. Portnoy personally selected every title, compiled the music and videos for the CDs and DVDs, and oversaw the artwork and liner notes for each release. Portnoy has also stated that he possesses the complete 25-year archive of every Dream Theater studio and live recording from 1985 to 2010.

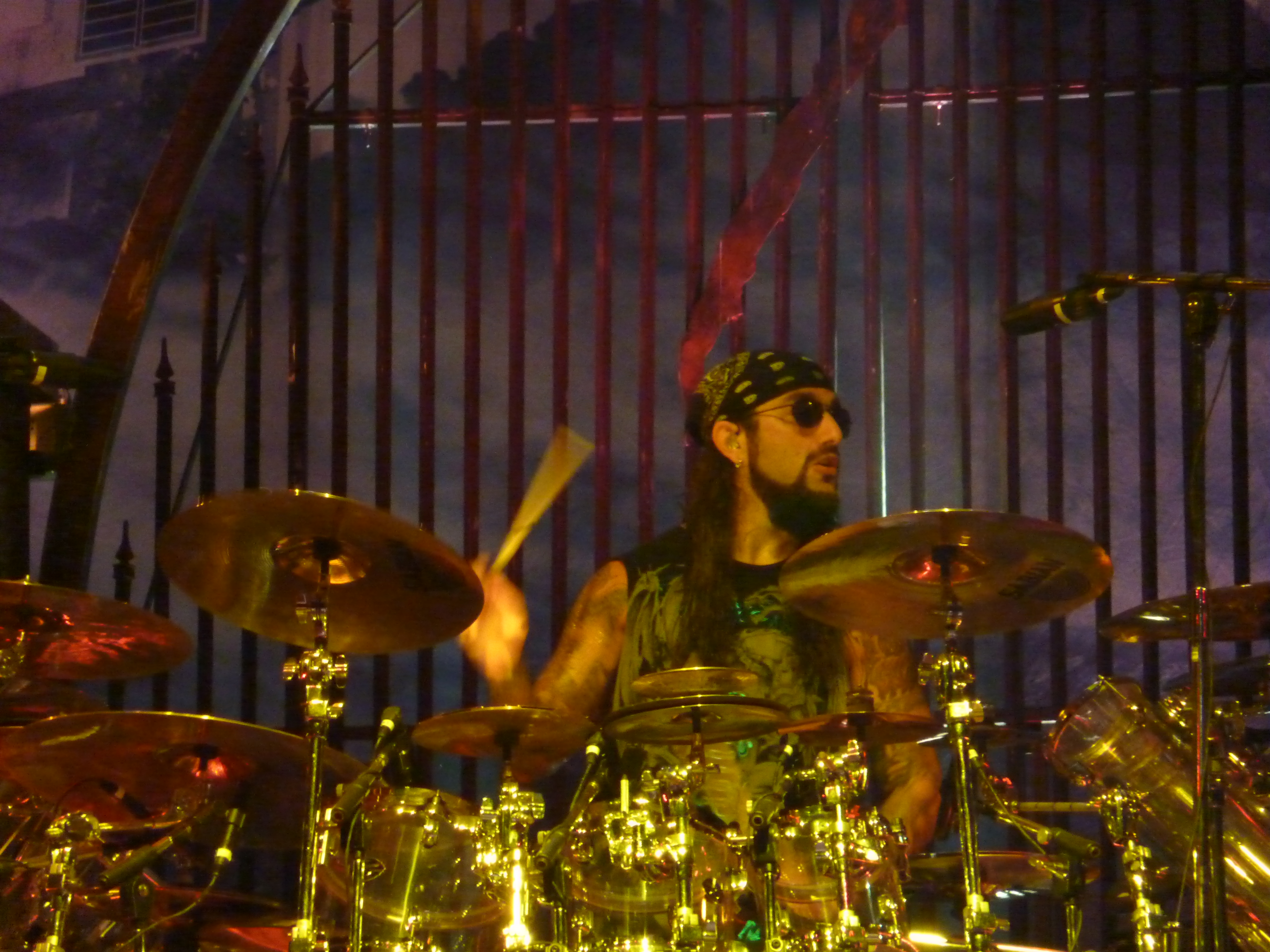
Portnoy with Avenged Sevenfold in 2010

In the spring of 2010, Portnoy filled in for Avenged Sevenfold's former drummer, Jimmy "The Rev" Sullivan, who died during the production of the band's fifth album, Nightmare. On May 5, 2010, Portnoy released a statement on his status with Avenged Sevenfold on their official website, confirming his working relationship with the band.

In September 2010, Portnoy announced he was leaving Dream Theater. The band hired Mike Mangini to replace him after inviting and holding auditions with seven "world-class" drummers.

Avenged Sevenfold chose not to continue working with Portnoy after the Nightmare tour was completed, partly due to the significant controversy surrounding his departure from Dream Theater. Following this, Portnoy announced that he had asked to return to Dream Theater but was turned down by their lawyer, as the band had already brought Mangini fully on board and he had left his teaching position at Berklee College of Music to join the band.

On October 25, 2023, Dream Theater announced that Portnoy was returning to the band, after gradually reconciling with the members throughout his 13-year absence and finally reconnecting with James LaBrie in 2022 at the band's show at the Beacon Theatre in New York. Shortly afterward, the band announced their first tour with Portnoy in fourteen years, titled the "40th Anniversary Tour 2024–2025", which began with a month-long European leg in October 2024. Portnoy's first album with the band in 15 years, Parasomnia, was released on February 7, 2025.

=== Former and current projects: 1997–2023 ===
Portnoy is known for his numerous side projects and tribute bands. He is a founding member of Liquid Tension Experiment, an instrumental progressive rock band featuring fellow Dream Theater members John Petrucci and Jordan Rudess, along with bassist Tony Levin. He is also a founding member of Transatlantic, a progressive rock supergroup featuring former Spock's Beard keyboardist/vocalist Neal Morse, Flower Kings guitarist Roine Stolt, and Marillion bassist Pete Trewavas. Outside of Transatlantic, Portnoy has worked extensively with Neal Morse, appearing on most of his solo albums. He is a member of The Neal Morse Band, which also includes guitarist/vocalist Eric Gillette, bassist Randy George, and second keyboardist/vocalist Bill Hubauer. Portnoy has additionally recorded and/or performed live with Umphrey's McGee, OSI, Hail!, Stone Sour, Fates Warning, Overkill, and G3. Over the years, Portnoy has created tribute bands honoring the Beatles, Led Zeppelin, Rush, and the Who.

After leaving Dream Theater, Portnoy formed several new bands, beginning with Adrenaline Mob, a traditional heavy metal/hard rock band with singer Russell Allen (of Symphony X) and guitarist Mike Orlando. On June 4, 2013, however, Portnoy announced his departure from Adrenaline Mob, citing scheduling conflicts.

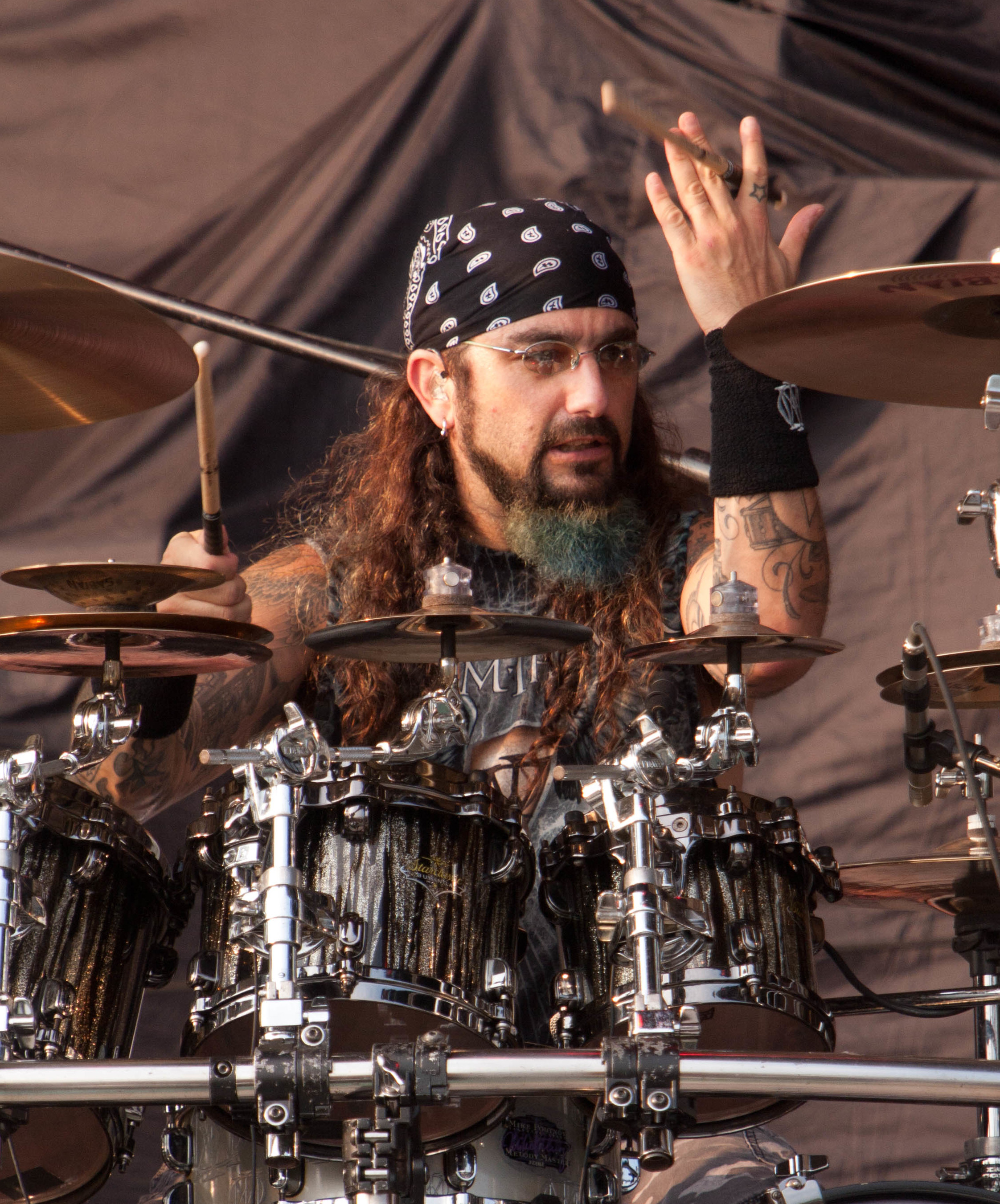
Portnoy performing at a concert in 2010

Portnoy is a founding member of Flying Colors, a progressive rock band that also features Steve Morse, Neal Morse, Dave LaRue, and Casey McPherson.

He also founded The Winery Dogs, a power trio with bassist Billy Sheehan (Mr. Big) and guitarist Richie Kotzen (formerly of Mr. Big and Poison); Sons of Apollo, a progressive metal supergroup with Sheehan, Derek Sherinian, Jeff Scott Soto, and Ron "Bumblefoot" Thal; Metal Allegiance, a thrash metal/groove metal band with Mark Menghi, David Ellefson (Megadeth), and Alex Skolnick (Testament); and BPMD, a supergroup/cover band with Menghi, Phil Demmel (Vio-lence), and Bobby "Blitz" Ellsworth (Overkill). He was also a member of PSMS with Tony Macalpine, Billy Sheehan, and Derek Sherinian.

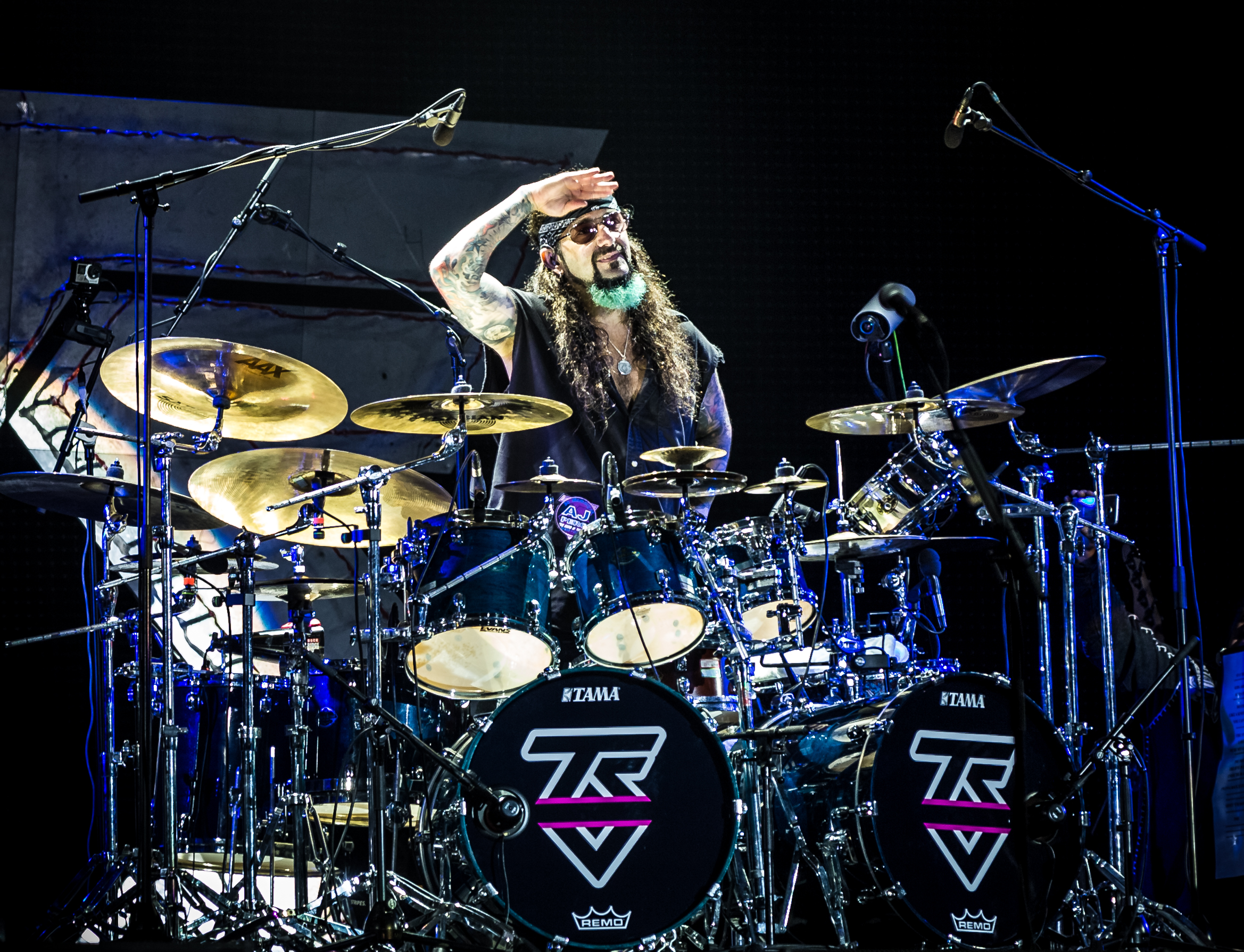
Portnoy with Twisted Sister in 2016

Portnoy also drummed with Twisted Sister from 2015 to 2016, following the death of longtime drummer A. J. Pero. He also performed with the band at their one-off reunion in 2023.

=== Other appearances ===
Portnoy performed at Guitar Center's 2011 Drum-Off finale alongside Billy Sheehan, Tony MacAlpine and Derek Sherinian.

In October 2015, Portnoy was featured in a Loudwire video where he played a game of "Name That Tune" on a children's Hello Kitty drumkit, performing songs such as "Love Gun" by Kiss, "Raining Blood" by Slayer, and "YYZ" by Rush. One year later, Loudwire featured Portnoy in a follow-up video in the same format using a children's Pokémon drumkit, performing songs such as "Painkiller" by Judas Priest, "Welcome Home" by King Diamond, and "Angel of Death" by Slayer.

Since 2019, Portnoy has been a recurring guest in the Drumeo YouTube channel. Videos featuring him, such as his playthroughs of "Shake It Off" by Taylor Swift and "Pneuma" by Tool, have attracted online attention.

In his playthrough of Nickelback's "Burn It to The Ground" for the Drumeo channel, Portnoy revealed he nearly played live with them for a festival gig in 2022, after their regular drummer wasn't able to make the show, before the festival ended up being cancelled.

Portnoy performed with the Blue Thunder Drumline at the Seattle Seahawks football game on September 24, 2023, playing a few songs with the drumline along with a drum solo. Portnoy shared it was an insanely cool experience playing on the Jumbotron in a football stadium in front of 65,000 people.

Portnoy appeared as a guest for "John Petrucci's Guitar Universe 5.0", the fifth edition of John Petrucci's guitar camp, in August 2025.

== Artistry and influences ==
In the April 2001 edition of Modern Drummer and on Portnoy's website, he named Neil Peart, Ringo Starr, Phil Collins, John Bonham, and Keith Moon as influences. He later also mentioned Lars Ulrich.

Portnoy played bass when Dream Theater performed as the fictitious band Nightmare Cinema. Before live performances of "Trial of Tears," he would sometimes switch instruments with John Petrucci and play a fragment of "Eruption" by Van Halen. In Nightmare Cinema, he went by the stage name "Max Del Fuvio".

Portnoy also played bass guitar and xylophone on a song from Liquid Tension Experiment 2. He has contributed lead and harmony vocals to numerous projects.

=== The "Portnoy fill" ===
Portnoy is often noted for a recurring drum fill he uses in songs, colloquially known as "the Portnoy fill." It consists of a repeating pattern of two sixteenth notes played on either the snare or a tom, followed by two sixteenths on the double bass pedal. Portnoy himself has credited Terry Bozzio as the originator of the fill.

== Progressive Nation ==
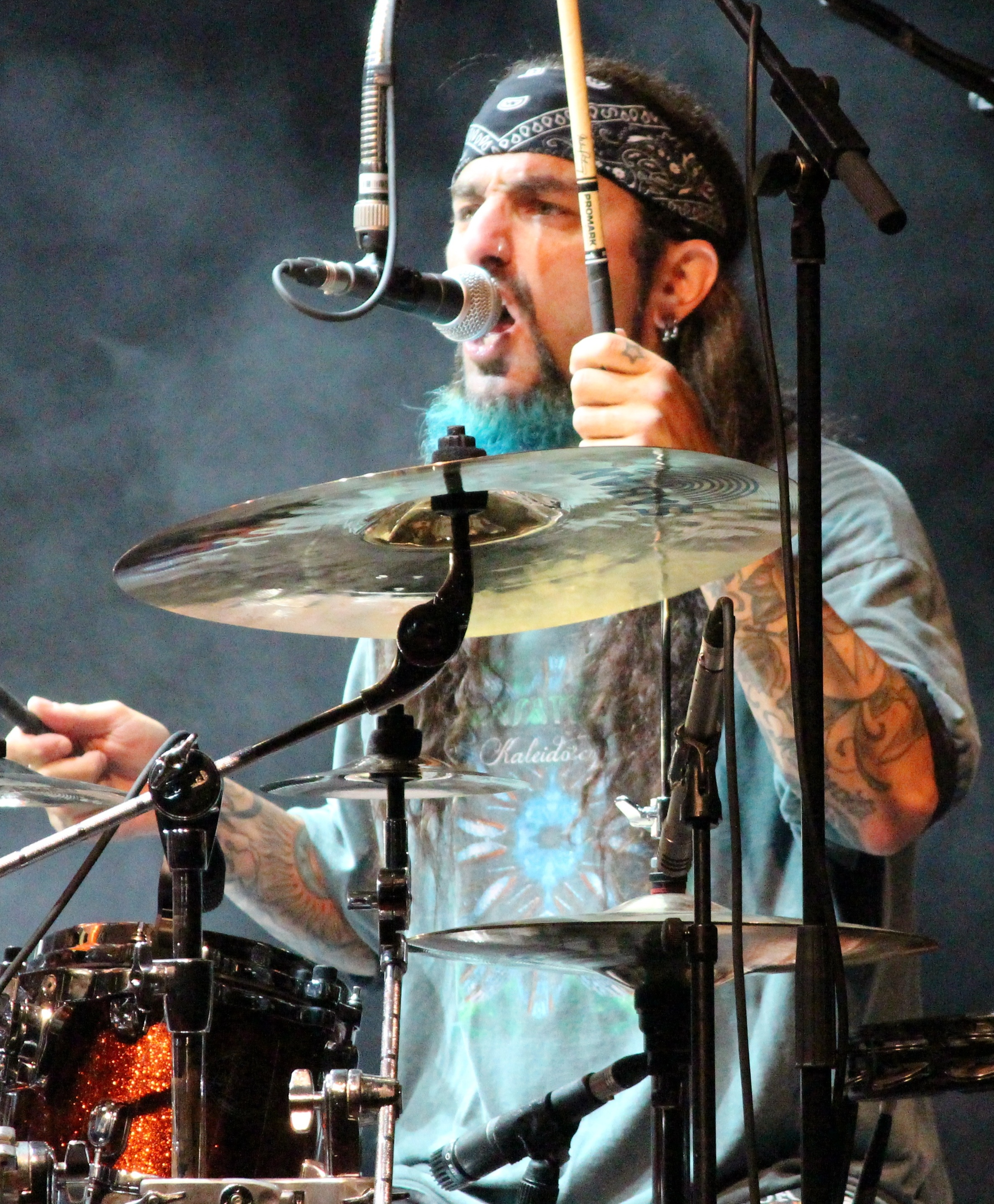
Portnoy performing in 2014

In 2008, Portnoy organized a tour called Progressive Nation. Dream Theater headlined the festival and were joined by Opeth, Between the Buried and Me, and 3. Portnoy stated, "I've been wanting to assemble a package tour like this for many years now. With all of the festivals and package tours that go through America, I've been talking with our manager and agent for over 10 years now about doing something that focuses on the more progressive, musician-oriented side of hard rock and metal. I decided it was time to stop talking the talk, lace up and finally walk the walk."

In 2009, the tour returned with Dream Theater headlining again, joined by Zappa Plays Zappa, Pain of Salvation, and Beardfish.

In 2014, Portnoy rebooted Progressive Nation as a 4-day cruising music festival called Progressive Nation at Sea. The event took place on the Norwegian Pearl from February 18–22, 2014, sailing from Miami, FL to the Bahamas. Portnoy organized the cruise with help from Derek Sherinian and music festival company Sixthman. Portnoy performed in three different bands on the cruise: Transatlantic, PSMS (Portnoy, Sheehan, MacAlpine, Sherinian), and Bigelf. Other progressive rock artists on the cruise included Jon Anderson, Adrian Belew's Power Trio, Devin Townsend Project, King's X, Spock's Beard, the Flower Kings, Pain of Salvation, Anathema, Riverside, Periphery, Animals as Leaders, the Safety Fire, Tony Harnell & Bumblefoot, Beardfish, the Dear Hunter, Haken, Jolly, Anneke Van Giersbergen, Mark Mikel, and his son Max Portnoy's band, Next to None. Portnoy described the cruise: "Progressive Nation at Sea still remains one of my proudest career memories…at the time, music cruises were just beginning to blossom and to be given the opportunity to assemble such an amazing lineup was a dream come true for me".

Since Progressive Nation at Sea 2014, Portnoy has joined forces with another cruising progressive rock music festival, Cruise to the Edge, merging the vision and musical lineups. CTTE has sailed annually since then.

== Personal life ==
Portnoy and his wife Marlene (née Apuzzo) live in Upper Saucon Township in the Lehigh Valley region of Pennsylvania with their children, Melody Ruthandrea (born May 3, 1997) and Max John (born March 7, 1999).

Portnoy is a recovering addict and has openly discussed it. The five-song set Twelve-step Suite addresses his experience with substance abuse. Portnoy began distancing himself from alcohol and drugs in April 2000 and has remained sober since.

Portnoy supported Democratic presidential candidate Joe Biden during the 2020 United States presidential election. Taking to social media, Portnoy posted: "I know political posts usually sparks heated debates and can sometimes even result in losing some fans, but I've recently decided to no longer silence my disdain for Trump as I find him a truly despicable human being." After Joe Biden won the election, Portnoy admitted to crying tears of joy upon listening to the post-election speeches.

== Equipment ==
Portnoy endorses Tama drums, Sabian cymbals, Promark drumsticks, and Remo drumheads. Though primarily a drummer and backing vocalist, he also contributes lead vocals, bass guitar, and keyboards.

== Discography ==
=== Dream Theater ===
- When Dream and Day Unite (1989)
- Images and Words (1992)
- Awake (1994)
- A Change of Seasons (1995)
- Falling into Infinity (1997)
- Metropolis Pt. 2: Scenes from a Memory (1999)
- Six Degrees of Inner Turbulence (2002)
- Train of Thought (2003)
- Octavarium (2005)
- Systematic Chaos (2007)
- Black Clouds & Silver Linings (2009)
- Parasomnia (2025)

=== Liquid Tension Experiment (including other variations of band) ===
- Liquid Tension Experiment (1998)
- Liquid Tension Experiment 2 (1999)
- Spontaneous Combustion (2007)
- When the Keyboard Breaks: Live in Chicago (2009)
- Liquid Tension Experiment 3 (2021)

=== Transatlantic ===
- SMPT:e (2000)
- Bridge Across Forever (2001)
- The Whirlwind (2009)
- Kaleidoscope (2014)
- The Absolute Universe (2021)

=== Avenged Sevenfold ===
- Nightmare (2010)

=== Neal Morse ===
- Testimony (2003)
- One (2004)
- ? (2005)
- Sola Scriptura (2007)
- Lifeline (2008)
- Testimony 2 (2011)
- Momentum (2012)
- Sola Gratia (2020)

=== The Neal Morse Band ===
- The Grand Experiment (2015)
- The Similitude of a Dream (2016)
- The Great Adventure (2019)
- Innocence & Danger (2021)
- L.I.F.T. (2026)

=== Flying Colors ===
- Flying Colors (2012)
- Second Nature (2014)
- Third Degree (2019)

=== Adrenaline Mob ===
- Adrenaline Mob (2011)
- Omertà (2012)
- Covertà (2013)

=== BPMD ===
- American Made (2020)

=== Haken ===
- Restoration (2014)

=== Metal Allegiance ===
- Metal Allegiance (2015)
- Fallen Heroes (2016)
- Volume II: Power Drunk Majesty (2018)

=== OSI ===
- Office of Strategic Influence (2003)
- Free (2006)

=== Sons of Apollo ===
- Psychotic Symphony (2017)
- MMXX (2020)

=== The Winery Dogs ===
- The Winery Dogs (2013)
- Hot Streak (2015)
- Dog Years (2017)
- III (2023)

=== John Arch ===
- A Twist of Fate (2003)

=== Between the Buried and Me ===
- Colors II (2021) (Drum solo on "Fix the Error")

=== Bigelf ===
- Into the Maelstrom (2014)

=== Asia ===
- Indigo (2026) (guest appearance on bonus track "Tattoo Indigo (Part 3)")
