= The Dreamer – Joseph: Part One =

Studio album by Neal Morse
- Released: August 11, 2023
- Genre: Progressive rock, rock opera
- Length: 65:01
- Label: Frontiers; Radiant (vinyl edition)

Neal Morse chronology
Innocence & Danger (w/ The Neal Morse Band) (2021)	The Dreamer – Joseph: Part One (2023)	The Restoration – Joseph: Part Two (2024)

Singles from The Dreamer – Joseph: Part One
- 1. "Like a Wall" Released: June 19, 2023; 2. "Heaven in Charge of Hell" Released: July 13, 2023

The Dreamer – Joseph: Part One is the twelfth studio album by American progressive rock vocalist, keyboardist and guitarist Neal Morse, released on August 11, 2023, via Frontiers. The album features vocals by Ted Leonard (Spock's Beard, Pattern-Seeking Animals, Thought Chamber), Matt Smith (Theocracy) and Jake Livgren (Proto-kaw, Kansas) and guitarists Steve Morse (Deep Purple, Dixie Dregs, Flying Colors) and Eric Gillette (The Neal Morse Band).

It is a concept album about biblical figure Joseph, following his story until his unfair imprisonment. It was written starting in September 2022; by December, Morse thought he had too much material for the listeners to digest in one single release and asked the label to put it out in two parts.

The album was released on digital platforms and, on September 15, as a brick orange 2 LP vinyl limited edition, with the first 2/3 ordered copies being signed by him and 5 randomly selected copies getting a handwritten and signed copy of the lyrics to the track "Like a Wall".

Two singles were released from the album, each of them with an accompanying video: "Like a Wall", on June 19; and "Heaven in Charge of Hell", on July 13.

== Critical reception ==
Professional ratings
Review scores
Source	Rating
Ghost Cult Magazine	7/10
Laut.de	4/5 stars
Metal Temple Magazine	6/10
Powermetal.de	8.5
Rock Meeting	3.9/5 stars
Sonic Perspectives	8.9

On a positive review for Laut.de, Yan Temminghoff compared Morse to Thomas Mann, thought The Dreamer – Joseph: Part One was better than the "considerably weaker" Sola Gratia and praised many of the tracks, including the instrumental overture, which he considered "among the best" by Morse in recent years.

On Sonic Perspectives, Scott Medina said the album would most likely cater to fans of Morse's two previous albums, but criticized what he saw as a conflicting direction between groups of songs, claiming that by the sixth track "The Pit" "we're clearly in theater-production-lyrics mode which feels a little at odds with what came before. And there's the confusing rub: the album sounds like a new Morse Christian prog rock album (e.g. the Sola albums) but reads more like a theater production (e.g. JCTE), so we're not quite sure which one we're getting". He praised songs such as "I Will Wait on the Lord" for featuring an a cappella choral arrangement ("Finally, a new musical approach in the Morse quiver and it's a welcome one) and "Ultraviolet Dreams" for being nearly entirely performed by Morse alone ("For all the guests on the album, sometimes it's best to get out of the way and just let Morse have at it"). He concluded by saying that "the tug of war between prog rock album and Broadway show is never resolved" and that while some guests did not perform as much as one would expect, most of the prevalent ones were already cast at Jesus Christ the Exorcist, "which binds these projects together in ways that don't always feel entirely unique or beneficial to creating their own identity", but conceded that it "offers plenty of quality material to satisfy Morse fans".

Writing for Powermetal.de, Jonathan Walzer considered that the album "benefits greatly from the diverse vocals" and said "anyone who has enjoyed Morse's music so far will not be disappointed by this work". He also highlighted the "skillful use of horns, which provides welcome variety and still feels rather atypical for rock music".

On Rock Meeting, Eric Berger felt that the songs of the album were "too long and verbose" and said he didn't "find Morse's signature style and his soaring, lyrical flourishes", comparing it unfavorably with One, Testimony and Sola Scriptura. He conceded, however, that Morse was "trying something new" and that "musically speaking, there's nothing to criticize".

MetalSymphony's Toni Marchante compared it favorably with Jesus Christ the Exorcist and called it "a great album", albeit not considering it Morse's best release. He finished by saying that "Neal Morse always delivers and “The Dreamer, Joseph Part 1” is no exception", commenting on his capacity to "tell a story and join it with a great variety of musical styles while also giving it an element of theatricality".

On Metal Temple, Alex Sales had low opinions of many songs, claiming most were not even actually rock. He conceded that it had some well composed tracks and that a few even had some cool elements, but concluded by saying that "the album has some nice progressive rock moments but it does not hide the fact that their audience is not the regular rock and metal fanatic, but religious people that think that this is rock".

Ghost Cult Magazine's Callum Reid praised the overall songwriting and performance, but said the lyrics "are often too simplistic" and that Morse has "perhaps over-extended the potential of the material beyond what any casual listener would want or expect". He concluded however that the album is "ambitious, rich, and varied, a sometimes challenging listen but definitely worth spending some time with".

== Track listing ==
The Dreamer – Joseph: Part One track listing
No.	Title	Length
1.	"The Dreamer Overture"	7:05
2.	"Prologue / Before the World Was"	5:59
3.	"A Million Miles Away"	3:35
4.	"Burns Like a Wheel"	2:27
5.	"Liar, Liar"	2:58
6.	"The Pit"	3:38
7.	"Like a Wall"	2:37
8.	"Gold Dust City"	5:18
9.	"Slave Boy"	3:38
10.	"Out of Sight, out of Mind"	2:45
11.	"Wait on You"	6:24
12.	"I Will Wait on the Lord"	3:06
13.	"The Dreamer Overture Reprise"	0:54
14.	"Ultraviolet Dreams"	6:40
15.	"Heaven in Charge of Hell (Eat 'em and Smile)"	4:59
16.	"Why Have You Forsaken Me?"	3:38
Total length:		65:01

== Charts ==
Chart (2023)	Peak position
Swiss Albums (Schweizer Hitparade)	72

== Personnel ==
Per Sonic Perspectives

=== Vocalists ===
- Neal Morse as Josephf
- Ted Leonard as Judah
- Matt Smith as Reuben
- Talon David as Potiphar's wife
- Jake Livgren as slave driver
- Wil Morse as Simeon
- Mark Pogue as Jacob
- Smith, Pogue, Wil Morse, Gabe Klein and Chris Riley as warden and prison guards
- Harmonie Hall, Devonne Fowlkes and Kim Mont — background vocals on tracks 2, 3, 6, 8, 9, 10, 11 and 14
- April Zachary, Julie Harrison, Amy Pippin and Debbie Bressee — background vocals on track 16
- Vanderbilt Blair Children’s Chorus Chorale (directed by Mary Biddlecombe) — choir on track 12

=== Instrumentalists ===
- Neal Morse — guitars, keyboards and percussion; bass on tracks 1, 2, 11, 13, 14, 15 and 16; drums on track 14
- Eric Gillette — guitar solo on track 11; drums on tracks 1, 2 and 13
- Steve Morse — guitar solo on track 2
- Gideon Klein — bass and guitars on tracks 3, 4, 5, 6 and 7; background vocals on track 7
- Andre Madatian — guitar solo on track 15
- Sam Hunter — guitars on tracks 3, 4, 5, 6 and 7
- Gabe Klein — keyboards on tracks 4, 5, 6 and 7; drums on tracks 3, 4, 5, 6, 7, 8, 9, 10, 11, 15 and 16; background vocals on track 7
- Mark Leniger — saxophone on tracks 1 and 15
- Paul Farmer — harmonica on track 1
- Jim Hoke — saxophone on track 8
- Hunter Keeran — French horn on track 16
- Josee Klein, Hannah Tyler, Carl Larson and Gideon Klein — string quartet on tracks 1, 2, 9, 10, 11, 15 and 16

=== Technical personnel ===
- Jerry Guidroz – mixing
