= Lifeline (Neal Morse album) =

Studio album by Neal Morse
- Released: October 1, 2008
- Genre: Progressive rock
- Length: 69:35
- Label: Metal Blade; Radiant Records

Neal Morse chronology
Secret Place (2008)	Lifeline (2008)	So Many Roads: Live in Europe (2009)

Lifeline is the seventh studio album by Neal Morse. The album features performances from Mike Portnoy (Dream Theater) on drums and Randy George (Ajalon) on bass, as well as special guest appearances including Paul Bielatowicz on guitar and Paul Gilbert (Racer X and Mr. Big), who features on a bonus cut. Live drummer Collin Leijenaar plays on the bonus track "Set the Kingdom".

Neal and his band first performed the title track, Lifeline, live at the Night of the Prog Festival on the Loreley, Germany. It was also played at a concert in Trondheim, Norway, with a local band.

It was later announced that the album would be released on October 1, 2008. Unlike many of his previous releases, Lifeline is not a concept album.

== Track listing ==
All songs written by Neal Morse except where noted.

Regular release
No.	Title	Length
1.	"Lifeline"	13:28
2.	"The Way Home"	4:20
3.	"Leviathan"	6:04
4.	"God's Love"	5:28
5.	"Children of the Chosen"	4:55
6.	"So Many Roads"; I. "So Many Roads"; II. "Star for a Day"; III. "The Humdrum Life"; IV. "All the Way to the Grave"; V. "The Eyes of the Saviour"; VI. "So Many Roads Reprise"	28:43
7.	"Fly High"	6:31
Total length:		69:33

A special edition was released with a CD of bonus material, including covers of four "pretty cool songs by pretty uncool bands" as well as two original songs. "Set the Kingdom" actually ends at 11:00 and is followed by silence before the hidden track.

Bonus disc (special edition)
No.	Title	Length
1.	"Crazy Horses" (The Osmonds)	3:40
2.	"Lemons Never Forget" (The Bee Gees)	6:37
3.	"The Letter" (Joe Cocker version)	4:17
4.	"What's So Funny" (Elvis Costello version)	4:43
5.	"Sometimes He Waits"	5:23
6.	"Set the Kingdom"	13:31
7.	"I'm a Heavy Metal Long-Haired Blue Bearded Tattooed Jew" (Hidden track)	4:37

== Reception ==
Professional ratings
Review scores
Source	Rating
The Dwarf	(Negative)
Progressive Melodies	3/5 stars
TheProgFiles	5/5 stars

Unlike the majority of Morse's work, reception for the album has been mixed to positive.

Radu Catrina of The Dwarf found it to be "an abrupt drop in quality" from what he considered previous excellent releases, and refers to Lifeline as "a descent into the often mind-numbing abyss of Christian rock".

According to Neal Morse's official website, TheProgFiles.com reportedly wrote: "Hands down, nobody in the industry does prog better than Neal Morse."

== Personnel ==
Band

- Neal Morse — keyboards, guitars, vocals
- Mike Portnoy — drums
- Randy George — bass

Special guests

- Paul Gilbert — lead guitar on "Crazy Horses"
- Paul Bielatowicz — lead guitar on "Lemons" and second guitar solo on "Fly High"
- Collin Leijenaar — drums on "Set the Kingdom"
- Carl Groves — backing vocals on "Lifeline", "The Way Home", "Children of the Chosen" and "So Many Roads"
- Jonathan Willis — strings on "The Way Home", "Eyes of the Saviour" and "Fly High"
- Jim Hoke — saxophone on "Leviathan" and "The Humdrum Life"
- Ivory Leonard and Danielle Spencer — backing vocals on "So Many Roads"

Technical personnel

- Rich Mouser - mixing
