= Neal Morse (album) =

Studio album by Neal Morse
- Released: October 5, 1999
- Recorded: March 1999 - Lawnmower and Garden Supply, Pasadena, California and The Morse House
- Genre: Rock
- Length: 55:40
- Label: Metal Blade; Radiant Records
- Producer: Bill Evans, Neal Morse

Neal Morse chronology
Neal Morse (1999)	It's Not Too Late (2002)

Professional ratings
Review scores
Source	Rating
AllMusic	4/5 stars

Neal Morse is the first solo rock album by Neal Morse. It was recorded in March 1999 at Lawnmower and Garden supply (drums) and Morse's house (everything else) and released on October 5, 1999.

== Track listing ==
All tracks written and produced by Neal Morse.

1. "Living Out Loud" – 4:31
2. "Lost Cause" – 5:02
3. "Landslide" – 5:28
4. "That Which Doesn't Kill Me" – 4:42
5. "Everything Is Wrong" – 5:03
6. "Nowhere Fast" – 3:45
7. "Emma" – 3:16
8. "A Whole Nother Trip" – 23:58
  - a) "Bomb That Can't Explode" – 9:03
  - b) "Mr. Upside Down" – 4:41
  - c) "The Man Who Would Be King" – 4:22
  - d) "It's Alright" – 5:52

== Personnel ==
=== Band ===
- Neal Morse - Lead vocals, synth, piano, acoustic, electric guitars, bass and drums
- Nick D'Virgilio - Drums (all tracks except #1), Backing Vocals
- Glenn Caruba - Percussion (track #8)
- Chris Carmichael - Strings (tracks #7 & #8)
- Dean Resturn - Sampled kicks and snares

Technical personnel

- Rich Mouser — mixing
