= ? (Neal Morse album) =

Studio album by Neal Morse
- Released: 1 November 2005
- Recorded: 2005
- Studio: The Morse House, Nashville, Tennessee
- Genre: Progressive rock, Christian rock
- Length: 56:23
- Label: Metal Blade; Radiant Records
- Producer: Neal Morse

Neal Morse chronology
God Won't Give Up (2005)	? (2005)	Whispers in the Wind – Acoustic Improvisations (2006)

Professional ratings
Review scores
Source	Rating
Allmusic	3.5/5 stars

? (Question Mark) is a Christian progressive rock concept album by multi-instrumentalist Neal Morse, his fifth studio album. Released in 2005, this single-CD album is about the Israelite tabernacle in the wilderness found in the books of Exodus, Leviticus, and Numbers of the Hebrew Bible. Morse has stated that this album should be considered one long epic track rather than twelve separate tracks.

The main band is Neal, Mike Portnoy (Dream Theater), and Randy George (Ajalon) with guests Mark Leniger, Alan Morse (Spock's Beard), Roine Stolt (The Flower Kings), Steve Hackett (Genesis), and Jordan Rudess (Dream Theater).

== Track listing ==
All songs written by Neal Morse except where noted:

No.	Title	Length
1.	"The Temple of the Living God"	6:13
2.	"Another World"	2:36
3.	"The Outsider" (Randy George, Morse, Mike Portnoy)	2:21
4.	"Sweet Elation"	2:32
5.	"In the Fire"	7:24
6.	"Solid as the Sun"	6:12
7.	"The Glory of the Lord"	1:41
8.	"Outside Looking In"	4:19
9.	"12"	6:46
10.	"Entrance"	6:22
11.	"Inside His Presence"	5:30
12.	"The Temple of the Living God"	4:27
Total length:		56:23

== Musicians ==
- Neal Morse – keyboards, guitars, vocals
- Mike Portnoy – drums
- Randy George – bass
- Jordan Rudess – keyboards
- Roine Stolt – guitars
- Alan Morse – guitars
- Steve Hackett – guitars
- Mark Leniger – guitars
- Chris Carmichael – violin, cello
- Michael Thurman – French horn
- Rachel Rigdon – violin
- Jim Hoke – saxophone
- Debbie Bresee – background vocals
- Jay Dawson – bagpipes
- Revonna Cooper – vocals
- Amy Pippin – vocals
- Debbie Bresee – vocals
- Wade Brown – vocals
- Joey Pippin – vocals

== Personnel ==
- Jerry Guidroz – engineer
- Ken Love – mastering
- Rich Mouser – mixing
- Thomas Ewerhard - cover art

== Release details ==
- 2005, USA, Inside Out Records SPV08548622, Release Date 1 November 2005, CD
