= Testimony 2 =

Studio album by Neal Morse
- Released: 23 May 2011
- Recorded: December 2010- January 2011
- Studio: The Morse House, Nashville
- Genre: Progressive rock
- Length: 115:09
- Label: Metal Blade; Radiant Records
- Producer: Neal Morse

Neal Morse chronology
So Many Roads: Live in Europe (2009)	Testimony 2 (2011)	Momentum (2012)

Professional ratings
Review scores
Source	Rating
Allmusic	3.5/5 stars

Testimony 2 is a progressive rock concept album by Neal Morse, his eighth studio album. It was released on 23 May 2011 as a continuation of his first Christian prog album (Testimony) and contains three sections detailing the composer's life and conversion to Christianity. Morse returns with his normal solo-album bandmates Mike Portnoy and Randy George, but he also features many guests, including a vocal reunion of Spock's Beard in the song "Time Changer", which focuses on Morse's past with his original band.

The album comes with a second disc of unrelated original songs, one of which is the epic "Seeds Of Gold", featuring a guitar solo by Steve Morse. The Special Edition includes a third disc, a Making Of DVD which runs over 60 minutes and chronicles the writing and recording of this album.

Also released with the album is Morse's first book titled Testimony - The inspirational and spiritual journey of a prog rock musician.

== Track listing ==
All songs written and composed by Neal Morse.

=== Disc One ===
Part 6
No.	Title	Length
1.	"Mercy Street"	5:12
2.	"Overture No. 4"	5:26
3.	"Time Changer"	6:08
4.	"Jayda"	6:05
Total length:		22:51

Part 7
No.	Title	Length
1.	"Nighttime Collectors"	4:26
2.	"Time Has Come Today"	4:55
3.	"Jesus' Blood"	5:27
4.	"The Truth Will Set You Free"	8:07
Total length:		22:55

Part 8
No.	Title	Length
1.	"Chance of a Lifetime"	7:02
2.	"Jesus Bring Me Home"	4:59
3.	"Road Dog Blues"	3:07
4.	"It's for You"	5:42
5.	"Crossing Over/Mercy Street Reprise"	11:46
Total length:		32:36

=== Disc Two ===
No.	Title	Length
1.	"Absolute Beginner"	4:41
2.	"Supernatural"	6:12
3.	"Seeds of Gold"	25:59
Total length:		36:52

=== Disc Three (Special Edition) ===
No.	Title	Length
1.	"The Making of Testimony 2 DVD"	64:28

== Personnel ==
- Neal Morse - producer, composer, guitars, synth, piano, organ, vocals
- Mike Portnoy - drums
- Randy George - bass

Additional musicians

- Steve Morse - guitar solo on "Seeds of Gold"
- Paul Bielatowicz - guitar solo on "Overture No. 4" and "It's For You"
- Matthew Ward - background vocals and soulful wailing
- Debbie Bressee, April Zachary, Mark Pogue, Mita Pogue - background vocals
- Jim Hoke - saxophones
- Mark Leniger - solo saxophone
- Kenny Barnd - violin on "Jesus Bring Me Home"
- Chris Carmichael - violin, viola and cello on all of Disc One
- Eric Brenton - electric violin solo on "Time Changer"
- Nick D'Virgilio - vocals on "Time Changer"
- Alan Morse - vocals on "Time Changer"
- Dave Meros - vocals on "Time Changer"

Technical personnel

- Rich Mouser - mixing (CD1)
- Jerry Guidroz - mixing (CD2)

== Charts ==
Chart (2011)	Peak position
Dutch Albums (Album Top 100)	67
German Albums (Offizielle Top 100)	55
US Top Christian Albums (Billboard)	46
