= The Restoration – Joseph: Part Two =

Studio album by Neal Morse
- Released: January 12, 2024
- Genre: Progressive rock
- Length: 1:20:06
- Label: Frontiers

Neal Morse chronology
The Dreamer – Joseph: Part One (2023)	The Restoration – Joseph: Part Two (2024)	Never Been Down This Road (2025)

Neal Morse overall chronology
The Dreamer – Joseph: Part One (2023)	The Restoration – Joseph: Part Two (2024)	No Hill for a Climber (w/ The Resonance) (2024)

Singles from The Restoration – Joseph: Part Two
- 1. "Cosmic Mess" Released: October 27, 2023; 2. "I Hate My Brothers" Released: November 29, 2023

The Restoration – Joseph: Part Two is the thirteenth studio album by American progressive rock vocalist, keyboardist and guitarist Neal Morse, released on January 12, 2024, via Frontiers.

Several guests from the previous album return, including Ted Leonard (Spock's Beard, Enchant, Pattern-Seeking Animals, Thought Chamber), Matt Smith (Theocracy), Jake Livgren (Proto-kaw, Kansas), Ross Jennings (Haken) and Eric Gillette (The Neal Morse Band), along with newcomers Alan Morse (Spock's Beard, Morse's brother) and Bill Hubauer (The Neal Morse Band). Like its predecessor, it is a concept album about Joseph, following his story from his unfair imprisonment until his reunion with his family.

Two singles were released from the album, each of them with an accompanying video: "Cosmic Mess", on October 27; and "I Hate My Brothers", on November 29.

== Critical reception ==
Professional ratings
Review scores
Source	Rating
Sonic Perspectives	8.5
Powermetal.de	8.0
Rock Meeting	4.7/5 stars
Metal Temple Magazine	10/10

On Sonic Perspectives, Scott Medina said that the second album "veers more towards a theater production approach than Part One did, taking it more in the direction of JCTE than its predecessor". He believed the musical flow was impacted by the need to tell a story through the vocals: "As always, there are plenty of melodic strengths to keep the listener engaged, but the density of the storyline [...] can become tiresome if the listener isn’t up for this kind of approach". He conceded however that the album "is a goldmine of Morse’s talents, featuring reoccurring themes, strong musical performances, plenty of drama, and plot twists". He felt the second half of the album was too long and that part two contained less killer tracks than one. On the other hand, he praised Morse's attempts at new sounds and lyrical approaches. He concluded by saying that "the bottom line is that if you enjoyed "The Dreamer", you're likely to find this to be a satisfying conclusion. But if Part One (and JCTE) were not your cup of Morse tea, this ain't gonna set things right.

Writing for Powermetal.de, Jonathan Walzer again praised the album for its "powerful choruses, excitingly structured songs [...] and plenty of instrumental gems", but admitted that he missed "the catchy tunes that stay with me even in everyday life" and concluded by calling it " a good, but not outstanding, prog album".

On Rock Meeting, Eric Berger compared it favorably to the previous album, ranking it as one of Morse's best. He called everything in the album "fantastic" and said Morse "showcases his full range" and that "his music knows no boundaries. It immerses itself in a torrent of emotions, each more powerful than the last".

On Metal Temple, "Metal Mark" Garcia said the album "sounds tender and introspective in some parts, grandiose on others, always tempered with excellent Prog Rock ambiences and psychedelic elements" and called it "a true delight for Prog Rock and Prog Metal fans".

== Track listing ==
The Restoration – Joseph: Part Two track listing
No.	Title	Length
1.	"Cosmic Mess"	6:10
2.	"My Dream"	2:40
3.	"Dreamer in the Jailhouse"	5:53
4.	"All Hail"	6:47
5.	"The Argument"	2:14
6.	"Make Like a Breeze"	4:09
7.	"Overture Reprise"	0:54
8.	"I Hate My Brothers"	4:25
9.	"Guilty as Charged"	4:48
10.	"Reckoning"	3:11
11.	"Bring Ben"	2:42
12.	"Freedom Road"	5:30
13.	"The Brothers Repent Joseph Revealed"	7:41
14.	"Restoration"	4:27
15.	"Everlasting"	5:55
16.	"Dawning of a New Day (God Uses Everything for Good)"	7:40
Total length:		1:20:06

== Charts ==
Chart (2024)	Peak position
Swiss Albums (Schweizer Hitparade)	67

== Personnel ==
Per Sonic Perspectives

=== Vocalists ===
- Neal Morse as Joseph
- Ted Leonard as Judah
- Matt Smith as Reuben
- Ross Jennings as the Butler
- Nick D'Virgilio as the Baker
- Talon David as Woman
- Wil Morse as Simeon
- Mark Pogue as Jacob
- April Zachary, Julie Harrison, Amy Pippin and Debbie Bressee — background vocals on track 16

=== Instrumentalists ===
- Neal Morse – lead vocals, bass, keyboards, drums (on track 1), percussion
- Alan Morse – guitar solo on track 15
- Sam Hunter – guitar on tracks 3 and 4
- Gideon Klein – rhythm guitar on tracks 3 and 4, bass on track 3
- Gabe Klein – keyboards on tracks 3 and 4; drums on tracks 2, 3, 4, 9, 10, 11, 12, 13, 14 and 15
- Bill Hubauer – keyboard solo on track 15
- Eric Gillette – drums on tracks 5, 6, 7 and 8
- Josee Klein, Hannah Tyler, Carl Larson, and Gideon Klein – strings on tracks 5, 8, 9, 10, 11, 12, 13, 14 and 15
- Chris West, Josh Scalf, and Tyler Jaeger – horns on tracks 1, 6, 8, 9, 12, 13, 14 and 15
- Harmonie Hall, Devonne Fowlkes, April Zachary, Kim Mont, Julie Harrison, Amy Pippin, and Debbie Bressee – background vocals

=== Technical personnel ===
- Jerry Guidroz – mixing
