= The Grand Experiment =

Studio album by The Neal Morse Band
- Released: February 10, 2015
- Recorded: 2014
- Genre: Progressive rock
- Length: 52:44
- Labels: Metal Blade/Radiant, InsideOut

The Neal Morse Band chronology
The Grand Experiment (2015)	The Similitude of a Dream (2016)

Neal Morse chronology
Songs from November (2014)	The Grand Experiment (2015)	Alive Again (2016)

Professional ratings
Review scores
Source	Rating
The Phantom Tollbooth	4.5/5 stars
Sonic Perspectives	9.3/10 stars

The Grand Experiment is the first album by the progressive rock supergroup The Neal Morse Band. The album was composed and recorded over a short period of time, with no preparation work before entering the studio. This is the first time Morse has recorded this way, with no prepared material (and as a completely collaborative effort with his new band), hence the album's title. It was released on February 10, 2015, in three formats: single CD edition, a special edition which includes the album plus a bonus CD and DVD, and a double CD and vinyl edition. A music video for the title track was released on January 7, 2015.

== Critical reception ==
Stereoboard named The Grand Experiment album of the year in 2015.

== Track listing ==
All tracks are written by Neal Morse, Mike Portnoy, Randy George, Bill Hubauer and Eric Gillette.

No.	Title	Length
1.	"The Call"	10:15
2.	"The Grand Experiment"	5:30
3.	"Waterfall"	6:32
4.	"Agenda"	3:45
5.	"Alive Again"	26:42
Total length:		52:44

Bonus disc
No.	Title	Length
1.	"New Jerusalem (Freedom Is Coming)"	7:12
2.	"Doomsday Destiny"	5:27
3.	"MacArthur Park" (Arranged by Bill Hubauer (original version written by Jimmy Webb with vocals by Richard Harris))	10:52
4.	"The Creation" (Live at Morsefest)	18:55
5.	"Reunion" (Live at Morsefest)	10:22
Total length:		52:48

== Personnel ==
- Neal Morse - lead vocals, keyboards, guitars
- Mike Portnoy - drums, backing vocals
- Randy George - bass, backing vocals
- Eric Gillette - guitars, lead & backing vocals
- Bill Hubauer - keyboards, lead & backing vocals

Technical personnel

- Rich Mouser - mixing
