= Blue Thunder (drumline) =

Drumline for the Seattle Seahawks

Blue Thunder is a 32-piece drumline for the Seattle Seahawks, a team in the National Football Conference of the National Football League. Blue Thunder made their debut in 2004, the first year in which Seahawks Stadium was renamed to Qwest Field, now known as Lumen Field.

The Blue Thunder consist of 30 pieces: 8 snares, 8 bass drums, 6 tenor drums and 8 cymbal players. They can be seen performing around the stadium and in local fan bars two hours before and after each home game, as well as on their stage by the 12th Man Flag during TV timeouts. They also travel the greater Seattle/Washington area promoting and playing music for the Seahawks.

Along with performing at the home games, the Blue Thunder also participate in over 100 different events throughout the year, including parades, corporate events, fund raisers, and local festivals.

Many celebrity drummers have joined the group for single games, including Alan White, Will Calhoun, David Garibaldi, Byron McMackin, Mike DeRosier, Steve Smith, Jason McGerr, Yuri Riley and Mike Portnoy.
