= Neal Morse =

American rock musician (born 1960)

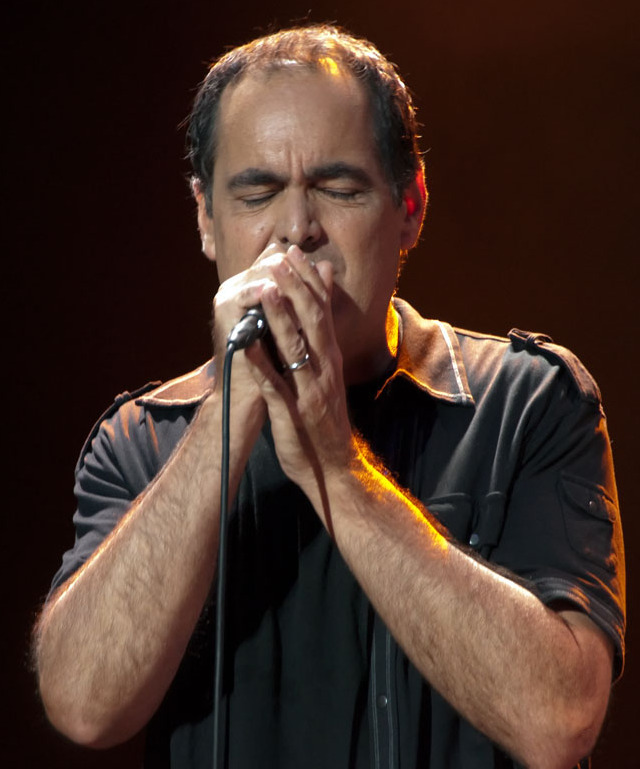
- Morse performing in 2012

Background information
- Born: August 2, 1960 (age 66); Van Nuys, California, U.S.
- Genres: Progressive rock; progressive metal; Christian rock
- Occupations: Singer; songwriter; musician
- Instruments: Vocals; keyboards; guitar
- Years active: 1980–present
- Labels: Metal Blade; Radiant; Inside Out
- Member of: Transatlantic; Flying Colors; The Neal Morse Band; D'Virgilio, Morse & Jennings; Neal Morse & The Resonance; Cosmic Cathedral
- Formerly of: Spock's Beard; Yellow Matter Custard
- Website: nealmorse.com

Neal Morse (born August 2, 1960) is an American singer, musician and composer based in Nashville, Tennessee. In 1992, he formed the progressive rock band Spock's Beard with his brother Alan and released an album which was moderately successful. In 1999, he joined Dream Theater's co-founder and drummer Mike Portnoy, the Flower Kings' Roine Stolt, and Marillion's Pete Trewavas to form the supergroup Transatlantic. In 2002, Neal Morse became a born again Christian, left Spock's Beard and began a Christian rock solo career, releasing many progressive rock concept albums about his new religious faith. In the meantime, he continued to play with Transatlantic and formed three new bands with Portnoy, Yellow Matter Custard, Flying Colors, and the Neal Morse Band.

== Biography ==
=== Band career ===
Morse grew up in the San Fernando Valley of Los Angeles as one of four children. His father was a choral director. Morse started to play the piano at the age of five and started to learn to play the guitar at the age of nine. During his twenties he wrote two musicals (Hit Man and Homeland), did some session jobs, tried to get a deal as a singer-songwriter in Los Angeles, and recorded a few country and western demos with his brother Richard.

After about ten years, having played in small Californian clubs with various groups including Burlesque, Morse founded Spock's Beard together with his brother Alan, to give voice to his great passion for Progressive Rock. Their first album, The Light (1995), was moderately successful. Despite having released the first two Spock's Beard albums to good critical acclaim, Morse found himself struggling economically. His brother Richard advised him to go to Germany to play hit songs as a one-man band in pubs, accompanying himself with piano or guitar, to generate income. Morse then began periodic travel between California and Germany, where from time to time he remained for several weeks to work as a pub musician. During his periods in California, Morse continued to alternate work on new compositions for Spock's Beard, and live performance with them. At that time Morse was also part of the Eric Burdon band, touring with them, too. The popularity of Spock's Beard's continued to grow and they would soon become one of a number of successful progressive rock bands during the late nineties (along with Dream Theater, Porcupine Tree, and the Flower Kings).

While with Spock's Beard, Morse released two solo albums of more conventional straightforward rock music. In 1999, he joined former Dream Theater co-founder Mike Portnoy, Flower Kings' Roine Stolt and Marillion's Pete Trewavas to form the supergroup Transatlantic. The band has released five studio albums (SMPT:e, Bridge Across Forever, The Whirlwind, Kaleidoscope and The Absolute Universe) plus live albums from the tours behind each studio disc: Live in America, Live in Europe, Whirld Tour 2010: Live in London, More Never Is Enough and KaLIVEoscope. In concert, the group has included Daniel Gildenlöw of Pain of Salvation, and occasionally Ted Leonard, Morse's eventual replacement in Spock's Beard.

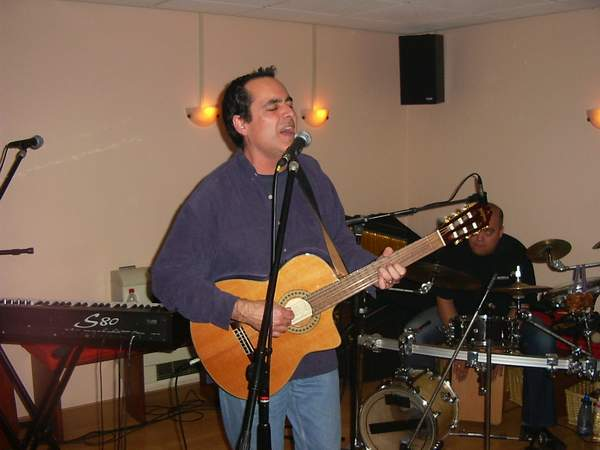
Morse recording on a classical guitar

In 2003, Morse, Mike Portnoy, Paul Gilbert and Matt Bissonette formed Yellow Matter Custard as a Beatles tribute supergroup. They took the name from a lyric in the Beatles song "I Am the Walrus": 'Yellow matter custard, dripping from a dead dog's eye...' On March 26, 2012, Morse released the first album of the newly formed band Flying Colors (Mike Portnoy on drums and vocals, Dave LaRue on bass, Neal Morse on keyboards and vocals, Casey McPherson on lead vocals, and guitar, and Steve Morse on lead guitar). In 2014, he gave life to another group, The Neal Morse Band (with Mike Portnoy, Randy George, Eric Gillette, and Bill Hubauer), that released its first studio album The Grand Experiment in 2015. The group's second outing, The Similitude of a Dream, was released on November 11, 2016, and the sequel to that album, The Great Adventure, was released on January 25, 2019. Their fourth record, Innocence & Danger, was released on August 27, 2021.

In 2024, Morse announced a new progressive rock project, Neal Morse & The Resonance, featuring local musicians from the Tennessee area. Their debut album, No Hill for a Climber, was released on November 8, 2024.

In 2025, Morse announced a new project with legends Chester Thompson, Phil Keaggy, and Byron House. The band, titled Cosmic Cathedral, released their first album, Deep Water, on April 25, 2025.

=== Solo career ===
Morse became a born again Christian in 2002. He left both Spock's Beard and Transatlantic immediately following the release of the Spock's Beard album Snow, in response to a calling to make his personal faith more prominent in his recorded output. He felt this would not be possible or appropriate in a band context. The period leading to this decision is described on the solo album Testimony (2003), an epic, introspective composition which features Kerry Livgren of Kansas and Mike Portnoy. One part of his conversion to Christianity, omitted from Testimony but described in full on Testimony Live and later in the song Jayda on Testimony 2, was that his daughter Jayda had been diagnosed as having a hole in her heart that required open-heart surgery. However, before Jayda received surgery, the hole disappeared following a church service in which Morse's wife and others prayed for God's healing.

In 2004, Morse wrote and recorded a new concept album featuring Portnoy and Randy George (on bass guitar). Guitar virtuoso Phil Keaggy made a guest appearance on guitar and vocals. The album, titled One, is about man's relationship with God from his Christian perspective and was released on November 2, 2004. In 2005, Morse released two non-prog Christian albums. In January, Morse recorded "Lead Me Lord" with the Christian Gospel Temple Choir, his children, and his friends. Morse wrote about half of the tracks. This was released in February and is available for a donation. In July, Morse released God Won't Give Up, which was written around the Snow period. This is a pop album similar to It's Not Too Late, but with Christian lyrics.

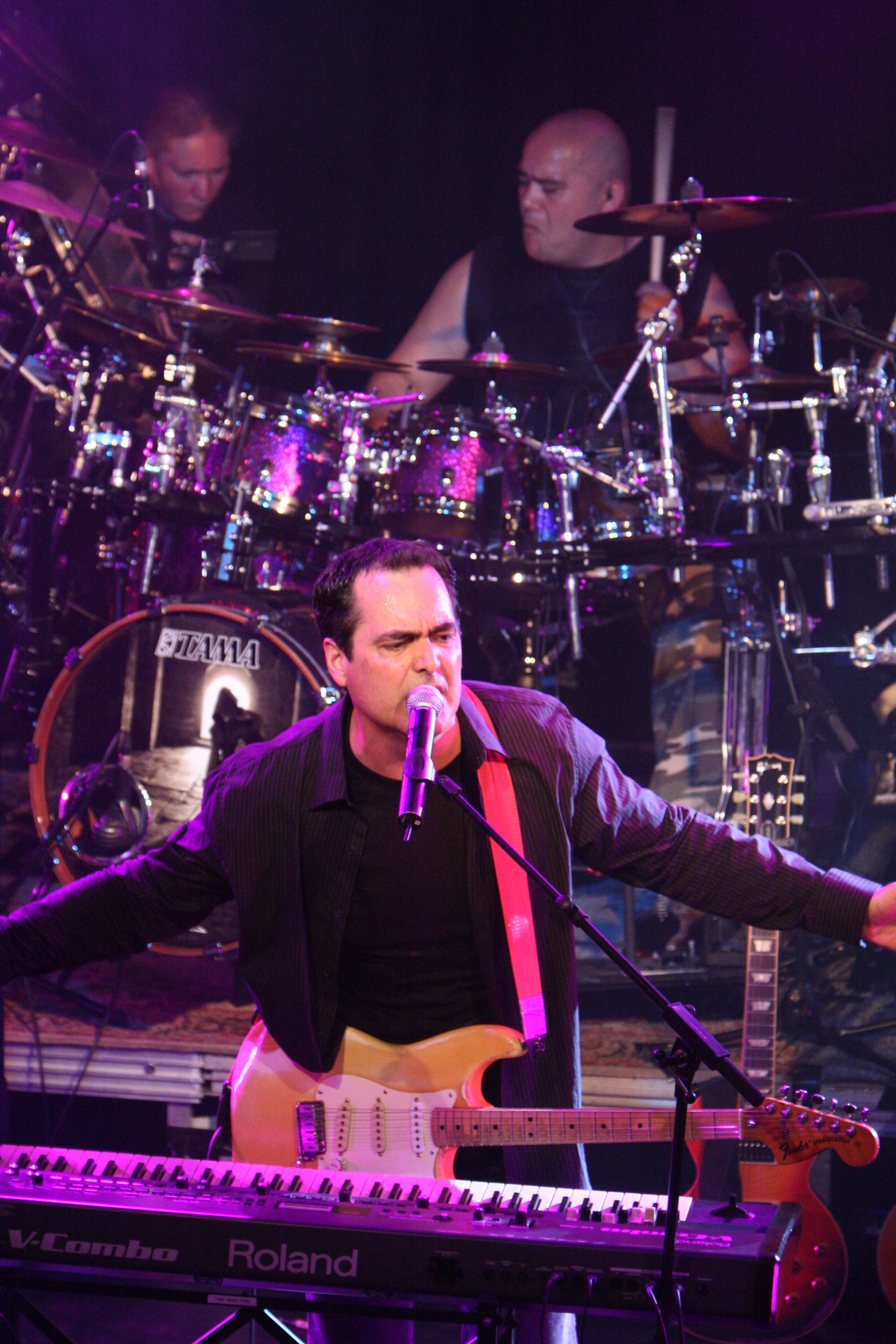
Morse in 2007

In the summer of 2005, a member of his church approached Morse to tell him that he should make an album based on the tabernacle and that he should keep it a secret. Morse nonetheless mentioned that he was working on a secret project before he had written a note or even committed himself to do the project. Mentioning it during a radio interview created enough buzz to convince him to make the album. There was a contest on his message board to guess the participants, theme, and meaning of the album based on a series of clues. The secret project was finally revealed to be ? (also known as The Question Mark album, rumored to be influenced in title by The White Album) and is about the tabernacle in the wilderness and the tabernacle of the heart. The studio band is Neal, Mike Portnoy, and Randy George with guests Mark Leniger, Alan Morse, Roine Stolt, Steve Hackett, and Jordan Rudess.

In 2006, Morse issued Cover to Cover, a collection of cover versions by Mike Portnoy, Randy George and him, recorded during the production of ?, One and Testimony, proving that despite the new focus of his solo career Morse wasn't averse to tackling songs with non-religious themes. In early 2007, Morse released Sola Scriptura, a concept album detailing the life and struggles of the German theologian Martin Luther, and corruption within the medieval Church. Portnoy and George once again teamed with Morse and were joined by Paul Gilbert (of Racer X and Mr. Big) who contributed a few solo parts.

Immediately following Sola Scriptura, Morse released the acoustic folk album Songs from the Highway. The studio album Lifeline was released on September 30, 2008. Morse was once again joined by Portnoy and George, just four months after the release of the Sola Scriptura live DVD. A live album, So Many Roads, recorded with his European band, was released on June 30, 2009. Testimony 2, a sequel and expansion of the autobiographical story from the first Testimony album, was released May 23, 2011. As had become Morse's pattern, he followed that album with a tour and live DVD. Also in 2011, he released a book, Testimony, a continued autobiographical look at his life story and spiritual journey explored in more detail than in the associated Testimony albums.

Momentum was released on September 11, 2012, featuring several shorter songs and one epic.

In recent years, Morse has recorded two more cover albums with George and Portnoy (Cover 2 Cover in 2012 and Cov3r to Cov3r in 2020), a guest-heavy prog rock musical retelling the life and Passion of Christ (Jesus Christ the Exorcist, released in 2019), a biographical album in the vein of Sola Scriptura based on the conversion and writings of Paul the Apostle (Sola Gratia, released in 2020), and a two-part musical based on the story of Joseph from the Book of Genesis (The Dreamer and The Restoration, released in 2023 and 2024, respectively).

During his early solo years, Morse focused most of his touring in Europe and had a band made largely of European musicians. The incarnation that toured in Europe for Sola Scriptura, for example, included Collin Leijenaar (drums, music director), Paul Bielatowicz (guitars), Elisa Krijgsman (guitars), Wilco van Esschoten (bass guitar), Jessica Koomen (vocals, keyboards, percussion) and Henk Doest (keyboards). For Testimony 2, Morse reunited members from the band that toured the initial Testimony album, including Portnoy, George, Rick Altizer and others. He then held a contest to assemble a full-time band, which eventually toured behind Momentum. This new band consisted of Mike Portnoy (drums), Randy George (bass), Eric Gillette (guitars, keyboards) and Bill Hubauer (keyboards). Guitarist Adson Sodré was in the band until visa issues forced his departure.

=== Guest appearances ===
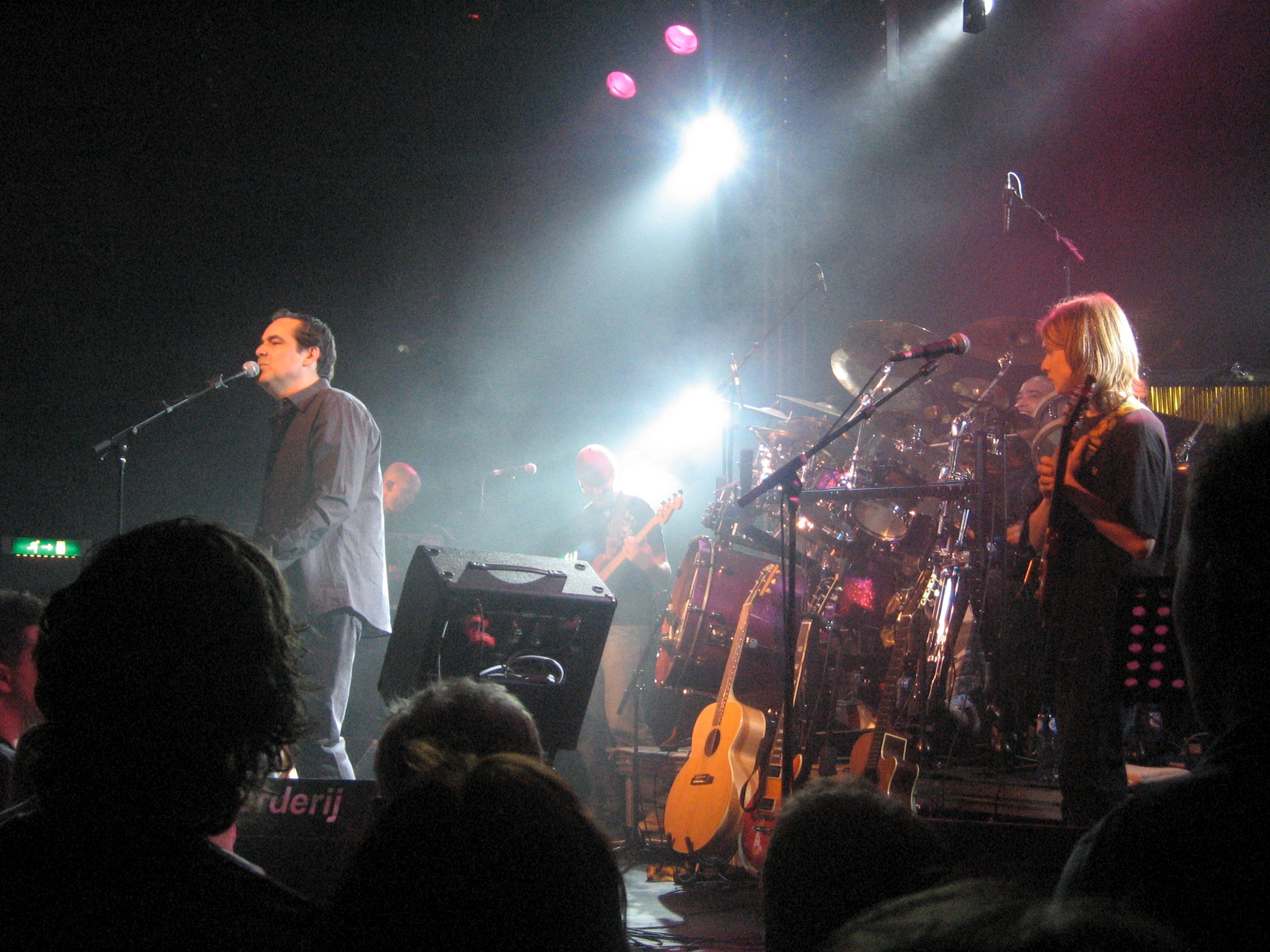
Morse (left) performing in the Netherlands, 2007

In 1997 he became a member of Eric Burdon's I band. They also released the concert film Live at the Coachhouse. In 2000, Morse provided vocals for the song "The First Man on Earth" on The Universal Migrator Part 1: The Dream Sequencer, one of Arjen Anthony Lucassen's Ayreon albums. Neal Morse tracks have also appeared on the CPR Volume 1 (2004), CPR Volume 2, and The Tsunami Projekt anthologies. Morse also participated in recording the ProgAID single "All Around the World". The profits for both The Tsunami Projekt and the ProgAID single were donated for victims' relief from the 2004 Asian tsunami.

Morse has been a guest musician on several 2005 albums, including Ajalon's Threshold of Eternity, Roine Stolt's Wallstreet Voodoo, Salem Hill's Mimi's Magic Moment, and Mark Leniger's Walk on Water. Morse was one of several musical guests to appear on Dream Theater's 2007 album Systematic Chaos, on the song "Repentance". These guests were recorded apologizing to important people in their lives for wrongdoings committed in the past. Morse provided vocals for the first track on Jordan Rudess' tribute album The Road Home.

In 2020, he joined Matt Smith of Theocracy in releasing "And the Rest Is Mystery" under the Project Aegis moniker.

In 2024, he made a rare appearance with Ryo Okumoto's solo band on Cruise to the Edge, alongside former Spock's Beard member Jimmy Keegan. The lineup also included current Spock's Beard members Nick Potters and Alan Morse.

== Radiant Records and Waterfall ==
In 1998, Morse founded his own independent record label, Radiant Records. The label serves as an outlet for his work in a variety of capacities, including development, licensing, promotion, and distribution.

In 2005, Morse created his fan club, the Inner Circle. The monthly membership provides an email newsletter and special releases to members every other month. Over the years, he has released many behind the scenes features, demo sessions, and bootlegs to the Inner Circle. See Inner Circle discography

In 2019, at the dissatisfaction of current streaming services and their treatment of artists, Morse created his own streaming service, Waterfall. Most of Morse's and his collaborator's discographies can be found exclusively on the platform.

== Morsefest ==
In 2014, Morse created Morsefest, a weekend concert festival held at his local church, New Life Fellowship, in Cross Plains, TN. The name of the event was chosen by Mike Portnoy against Morse's wishes, but the name stuck. The inaugural Morsefest occurred on November 14–15, 2014 and featured the Testimony and One albums played in their entirety with string, horn, percussion, and choir sections as well as a morning Inner Circle acoustic show. This two-day format with a large array of added musicians has continued annually featuring albums and musicians from all of Morse's projects, the Neal Morse Band, Spock's Beard, Flying Colors, and most recently in 2022, Transatlantic.

In 2020 and 2021, Morsefest went on with "Lockdown" editions due to the COVID-19 pandemic with a limited live audience, and for the first time, a virtual streaming option.

In 2023, in addition to the show in Tennessee, Morse took Morsefest on the road to Europe for the first time to The Boerderij in Zoetermeer, Netherlands and again in 2024 to Trinity Church in Essex, United Kingdom. In celebration of its 20th anniversary, Morse and the NMB played Testimony along with Testimony 2 in their entirety.

== Discography ==
Solo studio albums

- Neal Morse (1999)
- It's Not Too Late (2002)
- Songs from the Highway (2007)
- Songs from November (2014)
- Life & Times (2018)
- Late Bloomer (2024)
- Never Been Down This Road (2025)
