= The Similitude of a Dream =

Studio album by The Neal Morse Band
- Released: November 11, 2016
- Recorded: January–September 2016
- Genre: Progressive rock
- Length: 106:35
- Label: Metal Blade; Radiant Records

The Neal Morse Band chronology
The Grand Experiment (2015)	The Similitude of a Dream (2016)	The Great Adventure (2019)

Neal Morse chronology
Alive Again (2016)	The Similitude of a Dream (2016)	Life & Times (2018)

The Similitude of a Dream is the second studio album by progressive rock supergroup The Neal Morse Band, released on November 11, 2016. It is a concept album, loosely based on The Pilgrim's Progress by John Bunyan and follows Christian, who is tormented by spiritual anguish and told he must leave the City of Destruction to find salvation in the Celestial City.

The album was released as a two-CD package, a special edition with a bonus making of DVD, and as a triple vinyl version.

== Background and writing ==
Morse began writing in December 2015 and started researching The Pilgrim's Progress when he thought he needed some direction and presented his idea to the band one month later. As the band began working on the album, Mike Portnoy was adamant that the album be a single disc whereas Morse felt there was much more to the story that needed to be explored. Morse wrote additional material to complete a second disc and as the band was finishing the album, Mike Portnoy told the band, "we just made the album of our careers.". Portnoy later made these comments public when the album was announced saying, "Neal and I have now made 18 studio albums together, and I consider 'The Similitude Of A Dream' the absolute creative pinnacle of our collaborations together, after a career of almost 50 albums, I honestly consider this to be one of the defining works of my career". These comments caused much excitement and anticipation in the prog rock community.

The band released five videos in support of the album release. Long Day/Overture, City of Destruction, So Far Gone, The Ways of the Fool, and The Man in the Iron Cage.

== Critical reception ==
Professional ratings
Review scores
Source	Rating
Stereoboard.com	4.5/5 stars
Prog Radio	5/5 stars

The Similitude of a Dream was received with high praise, being honored as "Album of the Year" (2016) by several online music magazines, including Prog Radio, The Prog Report, The Fire Note, and Rock at Night.

The Prog Report said, "‘The Similitude of a Dream’ does the impossible and exceeds all expectations. It is absolutely a jaw-dropping release that will no doubt rank alongside the best albums by Neal Morse and Mike Portnoy, if not above them." Two years later, in 2018, The Prog Report ranked Similitude of a Dream as the all time best album in the Neal Morse discography.

Sonic Perspectives added, "'Epic' doesn’t begin to describe what these five musicians have managed to pull off here. It is a fantastic progressive rock opus in the best tradition of the finest prog of the 70s and is an album that I find tremendously satisfying, both spiritually and musically. It has everything any prog fan can ask for and then some, it is really the prog fan’s wet dream."

== Track listing ==
All lyrics are written by Neal Morse; all music is composed by Neal Morse, Mike Portnoy, Randy George, Bill Hubauer and Eric Gillette.

Disc 1
No.	Title	Length
1.	"Long Day"	1:42
2.	"Overture"	5:51
3.	"The Dream"	2:28
4.	"City of Destruction"	5:11
5.	"We Have Got to Go"	2:29
6.	"Makes No Sense"	4:10
7.	"Draw the Line"	4:06
8.	"The Slough"	3:03
9.	"Back to the City"	4:19
10.	"The Ways of a Fool"	6:48
11.	"So Far Gone"	5:21
12.	"Breath of Angels"	6:32
Total length:		51:59

Disc 2
No.	Title	Length
1.	"Slave to Your Mind"	6:27
2.	"Shortcut to Salvation"	4:36
3.	"The Man in the Iron Cage"	5:16
4.	"The Road Called Home"	3:24
5.	"Sloth"	5:48
6.	"Freedom Song"	3:59
7.	"I'm Running"	3:44
8.	"The Mask"	4:28
9.	"Confrontation"	3:59
10.	"The Battle"	2:57
11.	"Broken Sky / Long Day (Reprise)"	9:58
Total length:		54:36

== Personnel ==
The Neal Morse Band

- Neal Morse – lead vocals, keyboards, 6 & 12 string electric guitars, percussion, mandolin
- Mike Portnoy – drums, vocals
- Randy George – bass and bass pedals
- Bill Hubauer – organ, piano, synthesizers, lead vocals
- Eric Gillette – lead and rhythm electric guitar, lead vocals

Special guests

- Chris Carmichael – violin, viola, and cello
- Eric Darken – percussion ("Breath of Angels")
- Ann, Alfreda and Regina McCrary – background vocals ("Breath of Angels")
- Sarah Hubauer – baritone and alto saxophone ("Overture")
- Spencer McKee – marimba ("The Battle")
- Dave Buzard – stomps ("City of Destruction")
- Bruce Babad – saxophone ("Shortcut to Salvation")
- Steve Herrman – trumpets ("I'm Running")
- Jim Hoke – tenor and baritone saxophone ("I'm Running")
- Rich Mouser – pedal steel

Technical personnel

- Rich Mouser - mixing

== Charts ==
Chart (2016)	Peak position
Belgian Albums (Ultratop Flanders)	169
Belgian Albums (Ultratop Wallonia)	86
Dutch Albums (Album Top 100)	49
French Albums (SNEP)	178
German Albums (Offizielle Top 100)	25
Swiss Albums (Schweizer Hitparade)	56
