= Jesus Christ the Exorcist =

Studio album by Neal Morse
- Released: June 14, 2019
- Genre: Progressive rock
- Length: 109:59
- Label: Frontiers
- Producer: Neal Morse

Neal Morse chronology
| Lifes & Times (2018) | Jesus Christ the Exorcist (2019) | Sola Gratia (2020) |

Neal Morse general discography chronology
| The Great Adventour: Live in Brno 2019 (w/ The Neal Morse Band) (2019) | Jesus Christ the Exorcist (2019) | Sola Gratia (2020) |

Jesus Christ the Exorcist (full title: Jesus Christ the Exorcist: A Progressive Rock Musical by Neal Morse) is the tenth progressive rock studio album by American vocalist, keyboardist and guitarist Neal Morse, released on June 14, 2019.

It is a rock opera based on the Gospels and inspired by Jesus Christ Superstar. It features several guest performers, including Ted Leonard, Nick D'Virgilio and Morse's son Wil.

The album was released as a double CD version, a triple vinyl version and on streaming platforms. On September 10, 2018, a promotional video with audio snippets featuring all guest vocalists was released. On March 20, 2019, a video for the song "Get Behind Me Satan" featuring Leonard on vocals was released.

It was debuted live in 2018.

== Background and recording ==
The first draft of the musical dates back to 2008, when a friend of Morse called him, said he had watched Jesus Christ Superstar and that somebody ought to do a new rock opera based on Jesus' life. Morse spent the next months writing a first version of the opera and even attempted to have it performed at Broadway, to no avail.

It wasn't until 2018 that Morse's friend Michael Caplan informed him of Frontiers Music slr's interest on the project. Still in 2018, while getting ready for MorseFest, Morse rewrote the opera and presented it live during the festival. As Morse released his previous album with the Neal Morse Band in January 2019, The Great Adventure, he was already preparing the studio version.

The album's plot focuses on important moments of Jesus' life. The main events are his exorcisms, the empty tomb and his resurrection, with the songs also covering other episodes such as his baptism, his temptation, his entry into Jerusalem, the Last Supper, his trial and his crucifixion.

In an April 2020 interview, Morse expressed interest in transforming the album in a theatrical production to be presented in large cities such as New York City, Toronto, Chicago or his hometown Nashville.

== Track listing ==
CD 1
| No. | Title | Length |
|---|---|---|
| 1. | "Introduction" | 2:31 |
| 2. | "Overture" | 3:19 |
| 3. | "Getaway" | 2:41 |
| 4. | "Gather the People" | 5:17 |
| 5. | "Jesus' Baptism" | 3:09 |
| 6. | "Jesus' Temptation" | 10:18 |
| 7. | "There's a Highway" | 4:06 |
| 8. | "The Woman of Seven Devils" | 5:42 |
| 9. | "Free at Last" | 5:05 |
| 10. | "The Madman of the Gadarenes" | 7:07 |
| 11. | "Love Has Called My Name" | 4:15 |
| 12. | "Better Weather" | 1:42 |
| 13. | "The Keys to the Kingdom" | 4:48 |
| 14. | "Get Behind Me Satan" | 3:23 |
| Total length: | | 63:23 |

CD 2
| No. | Title | Length |
|---|---|---|
| 1. | "He Must Go to the Cross" | 3:10 |
| 2. | "Jerusalem" | 3:56 |
| 3. | "Hearts Full of Holes" | 3:40 |
| 4. | "The Last Supper" | 3:51 |
| 5. | "Gethsemane" | 7:39 |
| 6. | "Jesus Before the Council and Peter's Denial" | 3:13 |
| 7. | "Judas' Death" | 3:35 |
| 8. | "Jesus Before Pilate and the Crucifixion" | 8:17 |
| 9. | "Mary at the Tomb" | 2:45 |
| 10. | "The Greatest Love of All" | 5:00 |
| 11. | "Love Has Called My Name (Reprise)" | 1:30 |
| Total length: | | 46:36 |

== Reception ==
=== Critical reception ===
Professional ratings
Review scores
| Source | Rating |
|---|---|
| Metal Temple | 10/10 stars |
| Dangerdog | 5.0/5.0 |
| Sonic Perspectives | 9.3/10 |

Marcos Garcia at Metal Temple praised the album's variety of sounds and ultimately called it "an excellent album for Prog Rock and Prog Metal fans, and to all those who have a good musical taste".

Dangerdog's Craig Hartranft praised Morse for writing an accurate musical about Jesus, comparing it favorably with Jesus Christ Superstar due to what he perceived as "lack of Biblical and theological accuracy" in the 1970 rock opera. In terms of music itself, he said "you will love everything about this two CD work. The compositions are expressive and exspansive, moving between heavier melodic rock to symphonic rock to larger canvases that instill both drama and transcendence" and recommended the album for both followers and non-followers of Christ.

Scott Medina from Sonic Perspective remarked the blues progression of "The Woman of Seven Devils" and called the material of the album "consistently top-notch throughout" while pointing out that "not only is there no filler during the course of two hours, on the contrary there is an embarrassment of riches with more musical ideas and skilled execution than most bands can dream of."

=== Commercial reception ===
==== Charts ====
| Chart (2019) | Peak position |
|---|---|
| Belgian Albums (Ultratop Wallonia) | 136 |
| Dutch Albums (Album Top 100) | 100 |
| German Albums (Offizielle Top 100) | 64 |
| Swiss Albums (Schweizer Hitparade) | 86 |
| US Christian Albums (Billboard) | 39 |
| US Top Rock Albums (Billboard) | 5 |
| US Top Album Sales (Billboard) | 94 |

== Personnel ==
Vocalists

- Neal Morse as Pilate, Demon 1, Disciple 1
- Ted Leonard as Jesus
- Talon David as Mary Magdalene
- Nick D'Virgilio as Judas Iscariot
- Rick Florian as The Devil
- Matt Smith as John the Baptist
- Jake Livgren as Peter and Caiaphas
- Mark Pogue as Israelite 1, the Madman of the Gadarenes, Pharisee 2
- Wil Morse as Israelite 2, Demon 3, Pharisee 1
- Gabe Klein as Demon 2, Pharisee 4
- Gideon Klein as Demon 4
- Julie Harrison as Servant Girl

Instrumentalists

- Neal Morse — keyboards, guitar
- Paul Bielatowicz — lead guitar
- Bill Hubauer — keyboards
- Randy George — bass
- Eric Gillette — drums, guitar solo on "Jesus Before Pilate and the Crucifixion"

Technical personnel

- Neal Morse — producer
- Rich Mouser — mixing
