= Spock's Beard discography =

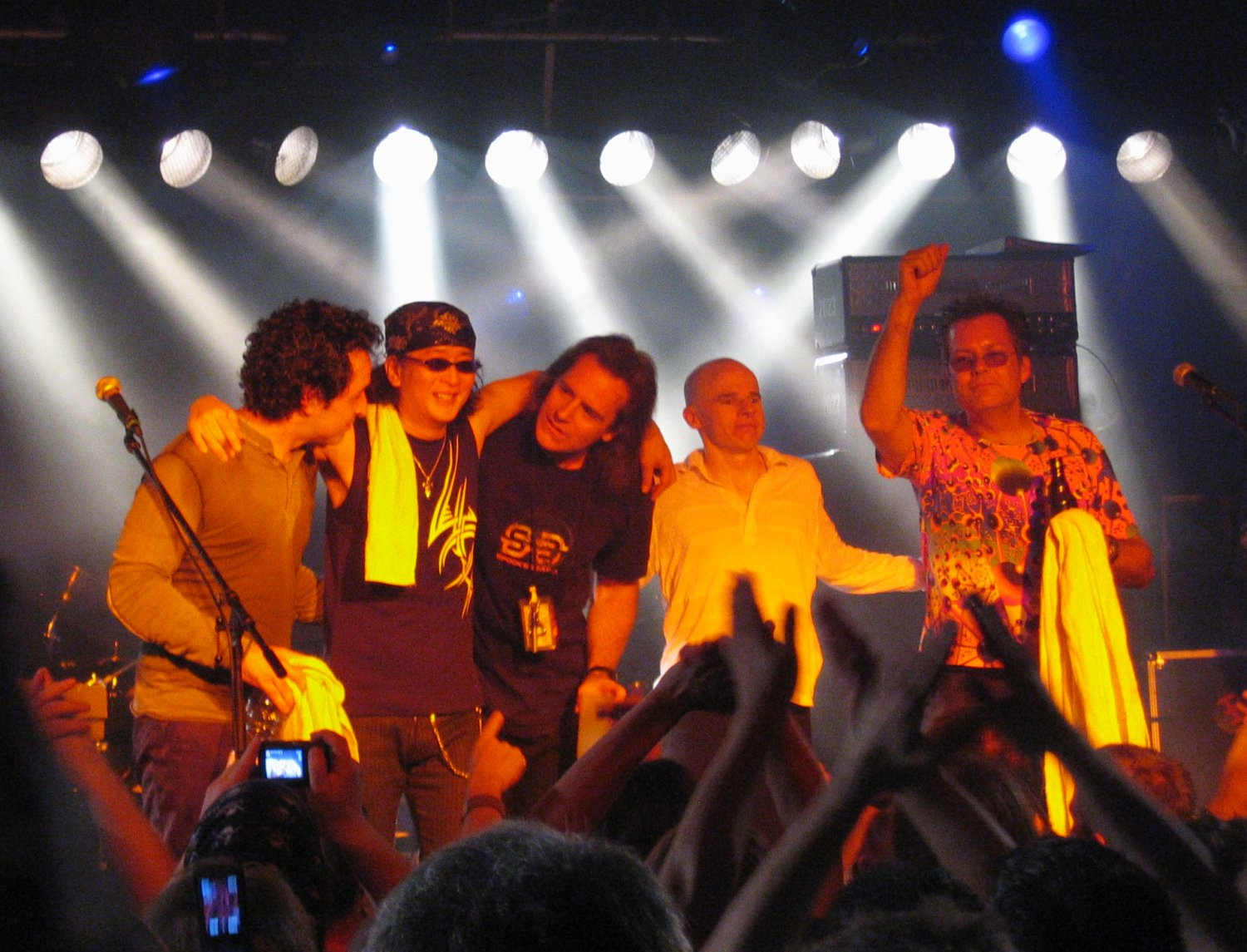
- Studio albums: 13
- Live albums: 8
- Compilation albums: 1
- Singles: 2
- Video albums: 6

The discography of Spock's Beard, an American progressive rock band, consists of fourteen studio albums, two compilations, eleven live albums, two singles, and seven videos.

== Studio albums ==
Title	Album details	Peak chart positions						Sales
Title	Album details	US Heat.	BEL (FL)	BEL (WA)	FRA	GER	NLD	Sales
The Light	Released: 1995; Label: Metal Blade Records; Formats: CD, HDCD, LP, digital download	—	—	—	—	—	—	
Beware of Darkness	Released: 1996; Label: Metal Blade Records; Formats: CD, digital download	—	—	—	—	—	—	US: 1,782+
The Kindness of Strangers	Released: May 19, 1998; Label: Metal Blade Records; Formats: CD, digital download	—	—	—	—	—	—	
Day for Night	Released: March 23, 1999; Label: Metal Blade Records; Formats: CD, digital download	—	—	—	—	—	—	
V	Released: August 22, 2000; Label: Metal Blade Records; Formats: CD, digital download	—	—	—	—	37	—	
Snow	Released: August 27, 2002; Label: Metal Blade Records; Formats: CD, HDCD, digital download	—	—	—	—	24	100	
Feel Euphoria	Released: July 8, 2003; Label: Inside Out Music; Formats: CD, digital download	—	—	—	—	58	—	
Octane	Released: February 1, 2005; Label: Inside Out Music; Formats: CD, digital download	—	—	—	164	81	87	
Spock's Beard	Released: November 21, 2006; Label: Inside Out Music; Formats: CD, digital download	—	—	—	—	—	—	
X	Released: May 1, 2010; Label: Self-released, Mascot Records; Formats: CD, LP, digital download	—	—	—	—	85	—	
Brief Nocturnes and Dreamless Sleep	Released: April 2, 2013; Label: Inside Out Music; Formats: CD, LP, digital download	47	162	171	—	89	—	
The Oblivion Particle	Released: August 21, 2015; Label: Inside Out Music; Formats: CD, LP, digital download	14	78	160	—	23	16	US: 1,300+
Noise Floor	Released: May 25, 2018; Label: Inside Out Music; Formats: CD, LP, digital download	—	—	—	—	23	—	
The Archaeoptimist	Released: September 21, 2025; Label: Madfish; Formats: CD, DVD, LP, digital download	—	—	—	—	—	—	
"—" denotes a recording that did not chart or was not released in that territory.

== Compilations ==
- From the Vault (1998)
- The First Twenty Years (2015)

== Live albums ==
- Official Live Bootleg/The Beard is Out There (1996)
- Live at the Whisky and NEARfest (1999)
- Don't Try This at Home (2000)
- Nick 'n Neal live in Europe – Two Separate Gorillas (2000)
- There and Here (2000)
- Gluttons for Punishment (2005)
- Live (2008)
- Live at High Voltage Festival (2011)
- The X Tour Live (2012)
- Live at Sea (2014)
- Snow Live (2017)

== Singles ==
- "Skin" (1999)
- "All on a Sunday" (2001)

== Other ==
- Live at Sweetwater Studios (2018) - in the studio
- "It's Never Enough" (2026) – on Alan Morse's solo record, So Many Words

== Videos ==
- Spock's Beard Home Movie (Video, 1998)
- Live at the Whisky (Video, (1999)
- The Making of V (Video, May 2001)
- Don't Try This at Home (2 DVD Set, November, 2002)
- The Making of Snow (DVD, 2004)
- Live (DVD, 2008)
- Live at Sea (DVD, 2014)
