= The First Twenty Years (Spock's Beard album) =

Greatest hits album by Spock's Beard
- Released: November 20, 2015
- Recorded: 1995–2015
- Genre: Progressive rock
- Label: Metal Blade; Radiant Records

Spock's Beard chronology
| The Oblivion Particle (2015) | The First Twenty Years (2015) | Noise Floor (2018) |

The First Twenty Years is a compilation album by American progressive rock band Spock's Beard. The 2-CD and DVD set features tracks from each of the band's first twelve studio albums, as well as one newly recorded song, "Falling for Forever", written by Neal Morse, which features all current and past members of the band (with the exception of original bassist John Ballard, who left prior to the recording of their first album and died in 1999). The DVD contains live and archival footage of the band. All tracks have been remastered by Rich Mouser. It was released on November 20, 2015

Falling for Forever was played live in 2016 with all current and past members of the band during the Snow Live concert at Morsefest in Nashville, Tennessee and the Night of the Prog festival in Loreley, Germany. It was later released in 2017 as part of the Snow Live Blu-ray DVD release.

== Track listing ==
CD 1
| No. | Title | Writer(s) | Original album | Length |
|---|---|---|---|---|
| 1. | "The Light" | Neal Morse | The Light, 1995 | 15:33 |
| 2. | "Thoughts" | N. Morse | Beware of Darkness, 1996 | 7:10 |
| 3. | "The Doorway" | N. Morse | Beware of Darkness | 11:36 |
| 4. | "June" | N. Morse | The Kindness of Strangers, 1998 | 5:30 |
| 5. | "Day for Night" | N. Morse | Day for Night, 1999 | 7:34 |
| 6. | "At the End of the Day" | N. Morse | V, 2000 | 16:28 |
| 7. | "Solitary Soul" | Alan Morse, N. Morse | Snow, 2002 | 7:34 |
| 8. | "Wind at My Back" | N. Morse | Snow | 5:12 |

CD 2
| No. | Title | Writer(s) | Original album | Length |
|---|---|---|---|---|
| 1. | "The Bottom Line" | Nick D'Virgilio, Stan Ausmus | Feel Euphoria, 2003 | 7:33 |
| 2. | "She Is Everything" | Dave Meros, John Boegehold | Octane, 2005 | 6:46 |
| 3. | "On a Perfect Day" | D'Virgilio, A. Morse, Ausmus, Boegehold | Spock's Beard, 2006 | 7:46 |
| 4. | "Jaws of Heaven" | Meros, Boegehold | X, 2010 | 16:22 |
| 5. | "Waiting for Me" | A. Morse, N. Morse | Brief Nocturnes and Dreamless Sleep, 2013 | 12:36 |
| 6. | "Tides of Time" | Ausmus | The Oblivion Particle, 2015 | 7:46 |
| 7. | "Falling for Forever" | N. Morse | Previously unreleased, 2015 | 20:00 |

== Personnel ==
- Neal Morse – vocals, guitar, keyboards, synths (Disc 1: all tracks. Disc 2: track 7)
- Alan Morse – guitar, vocals
- Nick D'Virgilio – drums, vocals, guitar, keyboards (Disc 1: all tracks. Disc 2: tracks 1–4, 7)
- Dave Meros – bass, vocals, keyboards
- Ryo Okumoto – keyboards, vocals (all tracks except Disc 1: track 1)
- Jimmy Keegan – drums, vocals (Disc 2: tracks 5–7)
- Ted Leonard – vocals, guitar (Disc 2: tracks 5–7)
