= Live at High Voltage Festival =

Live album by Spock's Beard
- Released: July 24, 2011
- Recorded: July 24, 2011
- Venue: High Voltage Festival, Victoria Park, London, UK
- Genre: Progressive rock
- Label: Concert Live
- Producer: Spock's Beard

Spock's Beard chronology
X (2010)	Live at High Voltage Festival (2011)	Brief Nocturnes and Dreamless Sleep (2013)

Live at High Voltage is a 2-CD set released by the progressive rock band Spock's Beard recorded by Concert Live. It features the band's complete performance at the UK's High Voltage Festival on one CD, with a second blank CD provided to burn online content onto (which includes an interview and photo gallery).

It is notable for featuring Neal Morse joining the band to perform "The Light" and "June". This marks his second reunion with his former band since his departure following the release of Snow (2002). Following Nick D'Virgilio's departure from Spock's Beard in November 2011, both Jimmy Keegan and Ted Leonard became official members of the band.

== Track listing ==
1. "On a Perfect Day"
2. "The Doorway"
3. "The Emperor's Clothes"
4. "The Light"
5. "June"

== Personnel ==
- Alan Morse – guitars, backing vocals
- Ryo Okumoto – keyboards, backing vocals
- Dave Meros – bass guitar, backing vocals

=== Additional personnel ===
- Ted Leonard – lead vocals, guitar, keyboards
- Jimmy Keegan – drums
- Neal Morse – guitar and lead vocals on the final part of "The Light" and "June"
