= Official Live Bootleg/The Beard Is out There =

Official Live Bootleg / The Beard is Out There

Live album by Spock's Beard
- Released: 1996
- Recorded: November 12, 1995
- Genre: Progressive rock
- Length: 66:17 (US); 72:18 (EUR)
- Label: Metal Blade; Radiant Records

Spock's Beard chronology
Beware of Darkness (1996)	Official Live Bootleg / The Beard is Out There (1996)	The Kindness of Strangers (1998)

Professional ratings
Review scores
Source	Rating
AllMusic	4.5/5 stars

Official Live Bootleg is the third album and first live album by American progressive rock band Spock's Beard, recorded at Progfest '95. It was released in 1996, with a European release under the title The Beard Is out There in 1998.

The original North American release consisted of the four tracks from the band's debut album The Light, with the fifth song, "Thoughts" coming from their second album, Beware of Darkness. The European release added a sixth track coming from the band's rarity collection From the Vaults, originally also from Beware of Darkness.

== Track listing ==
All songs by Neal Morse, except where noted.

No.	Title	Writer(s)	Length
1.	"The Light"	N. Morse, Alan Morse	16:19
2.	"Go the Way You Go"		12:40
3.	"Thoughts"		7:05
4.	"The Water"		23:12
5.	"On the Edge"		7:01

Extra track added to European release:

No.	Title	Length
6.	"Fire/Waste Away"	6:01

== Personnel ==
- Neal Morse – Lead vocals, guitar, keyboards
- Alan Morse – Guitar, backing vocals, cello, mellotron
- Dave Meros – Bass guitar, backing vocals, french horn
- Nick D'Virgilio – drums, percussion, backing vocals
- Ryo Okumoto – Hammond organ, mellotron
