= Live (Spock's Beard album) =

Live double album and DVD by Spock's Beard

Live album by Spock's Beard
- Released: June 13, 2008 - Austria, Germany, Switzerland; June 16, 2008 - Europe; June 24, 2008 - North America
- Recorded: May 25, 2007
- Genre: Progressive rock
- Length: 112:35
- Label: InsideOut Music
- Producer: Spock's Beard

Spock's Beard chronology
Spock's Beard (2006)	Live (2008)	X (2010)

Professional ratings
Review scores
Source	Rating
Allmusic	3.5/5 stars

Live

Video by Spock's Beard
- Released: June 13, 2008 - Austria, Germany, Switzerland; June 16, 2008 - Europe; June 24, 2008 - North America
- Recorded: May 25, 2007
- Genre: Progressive rock
- Label: InsideOut Music
- Producer: Spock's Beard

Spock's Beard chronology
The Making of Snow (2004)	Live (2008)

Live is a DVD and 2-CD set released by American progressive rock band Spock's Beard. The two versions are only available separately.

It is a live album that features the entire concert played by the band at Zoetermeer, Netherlands, on May 25, 2007. It is also the second live album released by the band after the departure of Neal Morse, and is the first one recorded for DVD without the presence of the band's former frontman. Morse recorded his own live album Sola Scriptura and Beyond at the same venue the following night Spock's Beard recorded this album.

Release dates were varied: June 13, 2008 for Austria, Germany, Switzerland, June 16, 2008 for the rest of Europe and June 24, 2008 for North America.

== Track listing ==
=== CD Version ===
==== Disc One ====
1. "Intro" – 1:32
2. "On a Perfect Day" – 8:00
3. "In the Mouth of Madness" – 4:58
4. "Crack the Big Sky" – 10:35
5. "The Slow Crash Landing Man" – 7:05
6. "Return to Whatever" – 6:37
7. "Surfing Down the Avalanche" – 4:26
8. "Thoughts (Part II)" – 4:58
9. "Drum Duel" – 4:48
10. "Skeletons at the Feast" – 7:14

==== Disc Two ====
1. "Walking on the Wind" – 10:04
2. "Hereafter" (Ryo solo) – 3:36
  As Far as the Mind Can See
3. "Part 1 - Dreaming in the Age of Answers" – 5:06
4. "Part 2 - Here's a Man" – 3:35
5. "Part 3 - They Know We Know" – 3:15
6. "Part 4 - Stream of Unconsciousness" – 5:49
7. "Rearranged" – 6:56
  Medley
8. "The Water" – 6:12
9. "Go the Way You Go" – 7:49

=== DVD Version ===
1. "Intro"
2. "On a Perfect Day"
3. "In the Mouth of Madness"
4. "Crack the Big Sky"
5. "The Slow Crash Landing Man"
6. "Return to Whatever"
7. "Surfing Down the Avalanche"
8. "Thoughts (Part II)"
9. "Drum Duel"
10. "Skeletons at the Feast"
11. "Walking on the Wind"
12. "Hereafter" (Ryo solo)
  As Far as the Mind Can See
13. "Part 1 - Dreaming in the Age of Answers"
14. "Part 2 - Here's a Man"
15. "Part 3 - They Know We Know"
16. "Part 4 - Stream of Unconsciousness"
17. "Rearranged"
  Medley
18. "The Water"
19. "Go the Way You Go"

== Personnel ==
- Nick D'Virgilio – lead and backing vocals, drums, guitar and keyboards
- Dave Meros – bass guitar, bass synth and backing vocals
- Alan Morse – guitars and backing vocals
- Ryo Okumoto – keyboards and backing vocals

Additional personnel

- Jimmy Keegan – drums and backing vocals
