= The Light (Spock's Beard song) =

Song by Spock's Beard

from the album The Light
- Released: 1995
- Genre: Progressive rock
- Length: 15:32
- Label: Metal Blade, Radiant Records
- Songwriters: Neal Morse, Alan Morse

"The Light" is a song by the American progressive rock group Spock's Beard. It is the first track on their debut album, The Light. It is one of the most well known songs by the band and was ranked as the second best Modern Prog Song of the 1990–2015 period by The Prog Report in 2017. It is one of the band's most played songs.

"The Light", as well as another track of the album, "Go the Way You Go", was written by the band's then vocalist and keyboardist Neal Morse right after he finished the Landmark Forum course he was taking at that time in order to re-signify his life and career following a period of disillusionment with the music business.

== Live appearances ==
- Official Live Bootleg/The Beard Is out There
- Live at the Whisky and NEARfest
- Don't Try This at Home
- From the Vault
- Gluttons for Punishment
- There and Here
- Live at High Voltage Festival
- Live at Sea

== Structure ==
All sections written by Neal Morse unless noted.

1. The Dream (0:00–0:48)
2. One Man (Alan Morse, Neal Morse) (0:48–5:14)
3. Garden People (5:14–6:46)
4. Look Straight into the Light (6:46–9:05)
5. The Man in the Mountain (9:05–11:10)
6. Señor Valasco's Mystic Voodoo Love Dance (11:10–12:46)
7. The Return of the Horrible Catfish Man (12:46–14:36)
8. The Dream (14:36–15:32)

== Personnel ==
- Neal Morse – lead vocals, keyboards
- Alan Morse – guitars, cello, vocals
- Dave Meros – bass
- Nick D'Virgilio – drums, vocals
