= Gluttons for Punishment =

Live album by Spock's Beard
- Released: 2005
- Recorded: March 18/20/21, 2005
- Venue: Colos-Saal (Aschaffenburg); Substage (Karlsruhe); Z7 (Pratteln)
- Genre: Progressive rock
- Length: 118:33
- Label: InsideOut Music
- Producer: Spock's Beard

Spock's Beard chronology
| Octane (2005) | Gluttons for Punishment (2005) | Spock's Beard (2006) |

Professional ratings
Review scores
| Source | Rating |
|---|---|
| AllMusic | 3.5/5 stars |

Gluttons for Punishment, released in 2005, is a double live album by the progressive rock band Spock's Beard. It was recorded during the band's Octane tour on March 18, 2005, at Colos-Saal in Aschaffenburg, Germany; March 20 at Z7 in Pratteln, Switzerland; and March 21 at Substage in Karlsruhe, Germany. It is the first live album released by Spock's Beard since the departure of the former frontman Neal Morse.

== Track listing ==
=== Disc one ===
1. "Intro" – 1:20
2. "The Ballet of the Impact" – 5:50
3. "I Wouldn't Let It Go" – 4:47
4. "Surfing Down the Avalanche" – 3:53
5. "She Is Everything" – 7:06
6. "Climbing Up That Hill" – 3:34
7. "Letting Go" – 1:20
8. "Of the Beauty of It All" – 4:56
9. "Harm's Way" – 11:17
10. "NWC" – 9:58

Tracks 1–8 are played in sequence and form A Flash Before My Eyes.

=== Disc two ===
1. "At the End of the Day" – 16:33
2. "The Bottom Line" – 7:40
3. "Ryo's Solo" – 5:57
4. "Ghosts of Autumn" – 6:49
5. "As Long As We Ride" – 8:26
6. "The Light" – 19:07

== Personnel ==
- Nick D'Virgilio - lead vocals, guitar, drums, percussion
- Ryo Okumoto - keyboards, vocals
- Alan Morse - guitars, vocals
- Dave Meros - bass guitar, vocals

Additional personnel

- Jimmy Keegan - drums, percussion, vocals
