= There and Here =

Live album by Spock's Beard
- Released: July 2001
- Recorded: August 31, 2000 – June 14, 2001
- Genre: Progressive rock
- Length: 125:15
- Label: Radiant Records

Spock's Beard chronology
V (2000)	There and Here (2001)	Snow (2002)

There & Here (From the Vaults, Series 4) is a double live album from American progressive rock band Spock's Beard. Individual songs were recorded at several shows on the V tours in Europe, as well as the August 2000 show at the Troubadour in Los Angeles. It was released in July 2001 on Radiant Records.

== Track listing ==
=== Disc one ===
No.	Title	Length
1.	"Beware of Darkness"	6:50
2.	"Gibberish"	5:10
3.	"At the End of the Day"	16:58
4.	"Revelation"	6:45
5.	"All on a Sunday"	4:15
6.	"Thoughts (Part II)"	5:01
7.	"Harm's Way"	12:33
8.	"Ryo's Solo"	10:03

=== Disc two ===
No.	Title	Length
1.	"The Great Nothing"	26:38
2.	"Medley: The Doorway/Mood for a Day/The Light/June"	19:53
3.	"Space Truckin'/Soul Sacrifice"	4:56
4.	"Whole Lotta Love/Waste Away"	12:03

== Personnel ==
- Neal Morse – lead and backing vocals, guitar, keyboards
- Nick D'Virgilio – drums, backing vocals
- Dave Meros – bass guitar, backing vocals
- Alan Morse – guitars, backing vocals
- Ryo Okumoto – keyboards, backing vocals
