= Brief Nocturnes and Dreamless Sleep =

Studio album by Spock's Beard
- Released: April 2, 2013 (International edition); March 25, 2013 (German and Russian edition)
- Recorded: 2011–2012
- Studio: The Mouse House, Atladena, California, US
- Genre: Progressive rock
- Length: 55:50 (Main album); 25:44 (Special edition bonus disc)
- Label: InsideOut Music and Century Media (International edition); Arcangelo (Japanese edition)
- Producer: Rich Mouser; Alan Morse; John Boegehold

Spock's Beard chronology
Live at High Voltage Festival (2011)	Brief Nocturnes and Dreamless Sleep (2013)	The Oblivion Particle (2015)

Brief Nocturnes and Dreamless Sleep is the eleventh studio album by American progressive rock band Spock's Beard released on April 2, 2013. It is their first album with new singer Ted Leonard and drummer Jimmy Keegan in place of Nick D'Virgilio, while former member Neal Morse co-wrote two tracks, including "Waiting for Me", on which he plays guitar.

== Background and recording ==
In the summer of 2011, Spock's Beard were scheduled to play at the Sweden Rock Festival and High Voltage Festival in Europe. Incumbent singer Nick D'Virgilio was unable to play at the dates, so the band recruited Enchant singer Ted Leonard to fill in for Nick on both shows. On 19 November 2011, Nick officially announced that he had left the band to pursue other projects, including playing for Cirque du Soleil. Later that week, the band announced that Leonard and touring drummer Jimmy Keegan had joined the band full-time as Nick's replacement.

On 13 May 2012, the band announced that work had begun on their 11th studio album, tentatively due in the fall of that year. On 1 December 2012, the title of the album was revealed as Brief Nocturnes and Dreamless Sleep and would be released in April 2013. As with previous albums, a preorder campaign was launched, this time on crowdfunding site Indiegogo, to fund the recording of the album. Contributors to the campaign were entitled to preorder a limited edition of the album that would include a bonus track not present on any other releases. The track listing was announced on the band's Facebook page on 18 January 2013.

== Critical reception ==
Professional ratings
Review scores
Source	Rating
Classic Rock	4/5 stars
Sea of Tranquility	4.5/5 stars
Sputnik Music	3.5/5 stars
Rock Hard	7.5/10 stars

The album has received positive reviews from music critics and has continued the return to progressive rock shown in its predecessors Spock's Beard and X. Classic Rock called the album, "the best album of their 20-year career to date."

== Track listing ==
Brief Nocturnes and Dreamless Sleep
No.	Title	Writer(s)	Length
1.	"Hiding Out"	Ted Leonard	7:13
2.	"I Know Your Secret"	Dave Meros, John Boegehold	7:40
3.	"A Treasure Abandoned"	Boegehold, Alan Morse	8:53
4.	"Submerged"	Leonard	4:57
5.	"Afterthoughts"	A. Morse, Neal Morse, Leonard	6:08
6.	"Something Very Strange"	Boegehold	8:23
7.	"Waiting for Me"	A. Morse, N. Morse	12:36
Total length:			55:50

Special Edition Bonus Disc
No.	Title	Writer(s)	Length
1.	"The Man You're Afraid You Are"	A. Morse, Stan Ausmus	7:11
2.	"Down a Burning Road"	Boegehold, A. Morse	6:51
3.	"Wish I Were Here"	A. Morse	6:33
4.	"Something Very Strange" (Sanctified remix)	Boegehold	5:09
5.	"Postcards from Perdition" (Limited Edition bonus track)	Boegehold	4:27
Total length:			25:44

== Personnel ==
=== Spock's Beard ===
- Ted Leonard — lead and backing vocals, guitar
- Alan Morse — electric and acoustic guitars, backing vocals, pedal & lap steel guitar, mandolin, autoharp
- Ryo Okumoto — organ, mellotron, piano, synths, clavinet, vocoder
- Dave Meros — bass guitar, backing vocals
- Jimmy Keegan — drums and percussion, timpani, backing vocals

=== Additional musicians ===
- Stan Ausmus — additional guitar ("The Man You’re Afraid You Are")
- John Boegehold — vocoder ("Something Very Strange")
- Craig Eastman — violin, viola, hurdy-gurdy ("Waiting for Me", "Down a Burning Road")
- Neal Morse — additional guitar ("Waiting for Me")

=== Production ===
- Produced by Rich Mouser, Alan Morse and John Boegehold
- Engineered, mixed and mastered by Rich Mouser at The Mouse House, Altadena, CA

=== Additional personnel ===
- Thomas Ewerhard — graphic design
- Alex Solca — photography
- John Boegehold — Candid photos
- Stan Ausmus — Candid photos

== Charts ==
Chart (2013)	Peak position
US Heatseekers Albums (Billboard)	47
