= The Oblivion Particle =

Studio album by Spock's Beard
- Released: August 21, 2015
- Recorded: 2015
- Studio: The Mouse House, Los Angeles, California, US; Jimmy Branly's Studio, Burbank, California, US
- Genre: Progressive rock
- Length: 65:50 (Standard edition); 72:04 (Special edition)
- Label: InsideOut Music
- Producer: Rich Mouser, Alan Morse and John Boegehold

Spock's Beard chronology
| Brief Nocturnes and Dreamless Sleep (2013) | The Oblivion Particle (2015) | The First Twenty Years (2015) |

Professional ratings
Review scores
| Source | Rating |
|---|---|
| Classic Rock | 3/5 stars |
| The Prog Report | Positive |
| Metal Temple | 10/10 stars |

The Oblivion Particle is the twelfth studio album by American progressive rock band Spock's Beard. It was released on August 21, 2015. It was the last album with drummer Jimmy Keegan, who left the band in October 2016 for personal reasons. This album also features Nick D'Virgilio on one track as a guest musician. Only 3 songs on the album feature writing credits to the band members themselves, with the rest being credited to longtime collaborators Stan Ausmus and John Boegehold.

== Track listing ==
Standard edition
| No. | Title | Writer(s) | Length |
|---|---|---|---|
| 1. | "Tides of Time" | Stan Ausmus | 7:45 |
| 2. | "Minion" | Ted Leonard | 6:53 |
| 3. | "Hell's Not Enough" | Leonard | 6:23 |
| 4. | "Bennett Built a Time Machine" | John Boegehold | 6:52 |
| 5. | "Get Out While You Can" | Boegehold | 4:55 |
| 6. | "A Better Way to Fly" | Boegehold | 8:57 |
| 7. | "The Center Line" | Alan Morse, Ryo Okumoto | 7:05 |
| 8. | "To Be Free Again" | Boegehold | 10:24 |
| 9. | "Disappear" | Boegehold | 6:36 |
| Total length: | | | 65:50 |

Special edition bonus track
| No. | Title | Writer(s) | Length |
|---|---|---|---|
| 10. | "Iron Man" (Black Sabbath cover) | Tony Iommi, Ozzy Osbourne, Geezer Butler, Bill Ward | 6:14 |

== Personnel ==
=== Spock's Beard ===
- Ted Leonard - lead vocals, guitars, additional tracks and overdubs recording
- Alan Morse - electric guitar, acoustic guitar, pedal steel guitar, lap steel guitar, mandolin, autoharp, backing vocals, producing, additional tracks and overdubs recording
- Ryo Okumoto - organ, mellotron, piano, synths, clavinet, vocoder, additional tracks and overdubs recording
- Dave Meros - bass, backing vocals, lead vocals on "Iron Man", additional tracks and overdubs recording
- Jimmy Keegan - drums/percussion, timpani, backing vocals, lead vocals on "Bennett Built a Time Machine"

=== Additional musicians ===
- David Ragsdale - violin on "Disappear"
- Nick D'Virgilio - drums on "Iron Man"

=== Production ===
- John Boegehold - concept, producing, Candid Studio photos
- Rich Mouser - producing, engineering, mixing, mastering
- Jeff Fox - second engineering
- Jeff Silverman - Alan's studio engineering
- John Morse - Alan's studio engineering
- Jimmy Branly - Jimmy's percussion engineering

Additional personnel

- Thomas Ewerhard - cover artwork, graphic design
- Alex Solca - band photography
- Stan Ausmus - Candid Studio photos

== Charts ==
| Chart (2015) | Peak position |
|---|---|
| Belgian Albums (Ultratop Flanders) | 133 |
| Belgian Albums (Ultratop Wallonia) | 78 |
| Dutch Albums (Album Top 100) | 16 |
| German Albums (Offizielle Top 100) | 23 |
| Swiss Albums (Schweizer Hitparade) | 51 |
