= Here and There =

Here and There may refer to:

- Here and There (Elton John album), 1976
- Here and There (Eric Dolphy album), 1961
- Here & There – S.E.S. Singles Collection, 2001
- Here and There (TV series), a Canadian documentary television series
- Here and There (2006 film), a Canadian animated short film
- Here and There (2009 film), a Serbian film
- Aquí y allá, also known as Here and There, a 2012 drama film

== See also ==
- There and Here, a 2001 album by Spock's Beard
