= Noise Floor (Spock's Beard album) =

Studio album by Spock's Beard
- Released: May 25, 2018
- Recorded: May 2017 – February 2018
- Studio: The Mouse House, Altadena, California; Sweetwater Studios, Fort Wayne, Indiana
- Genre: Progressive rock
- Length: 51:56 (Main album); 17:17 (Bonus disc)
- Label: InsideOut Music

Spock's Beard chronology
| The Oblivion Particle (2015) | Noise Floor (2018) | The Archaeoptimist (2025) |

Noise Floor is the thirteenth studio album by American progressive rock band Spock's Beard. It is the band's first full album of original material to feature original drummer Nick D'Virgilio since X in 2010, although this time D'Virgilio is only as a session musician. D'Virgilio had previously recorded a new song with the band for the compilation album The First Twenty Years and a bonus track for the band's previous album The Oblivion Particle, both released in 2015. Noise Floor was released on 25 May 2018.

== Background and recording ==
In October 2016, drummer Jimmy Keegan announced that he had left Spock's Beard in order to pursue other interests and the band's original drummer, Nick D'Virgilio, was drafted in to fulfill concert commitments. In March 2017, the band confirmed that they had begun writing for their next album, with plans to begin recording in May with D'Virgilio as studio drummer.

As with their previous three albums, recording and mixing for the then untitled thirteenth album was conducted at The Mouse House in Altadena, California, with additional drum tracking at Sweetwater Studios in Fort Wayne, Indiana. Mixing was completed by Rich Mouser in February 2018.

In March 2018, the album title and release date were revealed. It was also announced that the album would be released with a bonus EP of material from the same recording sessions, titled Cutting Room Floor. It was released on 25 May 2018.

== Reception ==
Professional ratings
Review scores
| Source | Rating |
|---|---|
| Express | 4/5 stars |
| Keyboard | Positive |
| MaximumVolumeMusic | 8/10 |
| Metal Nation | 9/10 |
| The Prog Report | Positive |
| Rock Hard | 7.5/10 |
| Sonic Perspectives | 9.1/10 |

The album received generally favourable reviews. In his review for Sonic Perspectives, Scott Medina praised Rich Mouser's production and the band members' musicianship, stating that "none of the material here may reach the Top 10 Spock's songs of all time, but they all hover within a good to excellent range". Reviews for Keyboard magazine and The Prog Report both singled out Ryo Okumoto's contribution as particularly noteworthy.

== Track listing ==
Noise Floor
| No. | Title | Writer(s) | Length |
|---|---|---|---|
| 1. | "To Breathe Another Day" | John Boegehold, Ryo Okumoto | 5:38 |
| 2. | "What Becomes of Me" | Boegehold | 6:11 |
| 3. | "Somebody's Home" | Ted Leonard, Alan Morse | 6:32 |
| 4. | "Have We All Gone Crazy Yet" | Leonard, Morse | 8:07 |
| 5. | "So This Is Life" | Stan Ausmus, Morse | 5:36 |
| 6. | "One So Wise" | Ausmus | 6:58 |
| 7. | "Box of Spiders" (instrumental) | Okumoto | 5:29 |
| 8. | "Beginnings" | Leonard, Okumoto | 7:25 |

Cutting Room Floor
| No. | Title | Writer(s) | Length |
|---|---|---|---|
| 1. | "Days We'll Remember" | Boegehold | 4:15 |
| 2. | "Bulletproof" | Boegehold | 4:41 |
| 3. | "Vault" | Leonard | 4:49 |
| 4. | "Armageddon Nervous" (instrumental) | Boegehold | 3:32 |

== Personnel ==
Spock's Beard

- Ted Leonard – vocals, electric and acoustic guitars
- Alan Morse – 6 and 12 string electric and acoustic guitars, vocals
- Ryo Okumoto – piano, Hammond organ, mellotron, Jupiter 8, Minimoog, Nord Wave, Yamaha Motif, IK multimedia, Arturia
- Dave Meros – bass, vocals

Additional musicians

- Nick D'Virgilio – drums, vocals
- Eric Gorfain – violin
- Leah Katz – viola
- Richard Dodd – cello
- David Robertson – English horn

Production

- Rich Mouser – mastering, mixing

== Charts ==
| Chart (2018) | Peak position |
|---|---|
| Austrian Albums (Ö3 Austria) | 47 |
| Belgian Albums (Ultratop Wallonia) | 110 |
| Dutch Albums (Album Top 100) | 101 |
| German Albums (Offizielle Top 100) | 23 |
| Swiss Albums (Schweizer Hitparade) | 24 |
