= Beware of Darkness =

Beware of Darkness may refer to:

- Beware of Darkness (album), an album by Spock's Beard
- Beware of Darkness (band), an American rock band
- "Beware of Darkness" (song), a song by George Harrison
