= Onomatopoeia (disambiguation) =

Onomatopoeia is a word that imitates the sound it describes.

Onomatopoeia may also refer to:

- Onomatopoeia (character), a villain in Green Arrow and Batman comic books
- Onomatopoeia (album), an album by the band Flobots
- "Onomatopoeia", a song by Todd Rundgren from the album Hermit of Mink Hollow
- "Onomatopoeia", a song by progressive rock band Spock's Beard from the album Feel Euphoria
