= Octane (disambiguation) =

Octane is an alkane with the chemical formula C_{8}H_{18}.

Octane may also refer to:

== Chemistry ==
- 2,2,4-Trimethylpentane or iso-Octane
- Octane rating, a motor-fuel classification

== Art and entertainment ==
- Octane (Spock's Beard album), 2005
- Octane (Don Toliver album), 2026
- Octane (film), a 2003 film by Marcus Adams
- Octane (magazine), a British car magazine
- Octane (Sirius XM), a Sirius XM Radio hard rock channel
- Octane, a character in the video game Apex Legends
- Octane, the default starter car in Rocket League

== Computing ==
- Octane (software test), a performance benchmark of Javascript engines used in web browsers
- Octane Render, a 3D rendering application
- SGI Octane, an SGI computer

== See also ==
- Octan, fictional oil company that has appeared in numerous Lego construction sets
