= Okumoto =

Okumoto is a Japanese surname. Notable people with the surname include:

- Ryo Okumoto (奥本 亮, born 1959), Japanese musician
- Yuji Okumoto (雄二・ドン・奥本, born 1959), American actor and filmmaker
