= Pattern-Seeking Animals =

American progressive rock band

- Origin: California
- Genres: Progressive rock
- Years active: 2018–present
- Label: Inside Out
- Spinoff of: Spock's Beard
- Members: Dave Meros; Ted Leonard; Jimmy Keegan; John Boegehold
- Website: psanimals1.com

Pattern-Seeking Animals is an American progressive rock supergroup formed in 2018 by Ted Leonard, Dave Meros, John Boegehold and Jimmy Keegan, all of whom are current or former members and collaborators of fellow progressive rock ensemble Spock's Beard.

== Name ==
About the band's name, Leonard said in an interview:

It's basically a description of the human being. What separates us from animals is our tendency (or necessity) to give a meaning to our surroundings. It's also part of the song "Bulletproof" from Spock's latest album which, once written, John added to his long list of bands/albums names.

== History ==
The band was put together to perform some music that Boegehold had been writing in 2018, with Leonard and Meros co-writing some of the material. They eventually agreed to turn it into a band and now intend to release one album every year and go on tour with additional session musicians.

After signing with Inside Out Music, the band released its first, self-titled album on July 5, 2019. The second album, Prehensile Tales, came out less than a year later, on May 15, 2020, and was positively reviewed by Prog.

Their third album, Only Passing Through, was released on April 1, 2022. Their fourth album, Spooky Action at a Distance, was released on October 27, 2023. Their fifth album, Friend of all Creatures, was released on February 14, 2025.

== Members ==
Band members

- Ted Leonard – lead vocals, lead and rhythm guitar (2018–present)
- Dave Meros – bass, backing vocals (2018–present)
- John Boegehold – keyboards, synthesizers, mellotron, programming, guitar, mandolin, backing vocals (2018–present; not touring)
- Jimmy Keegan – drums, percussion, backing vocals (2018–present)

Live members

- Dennis Atlas – keyboards, backing vocals (2022–present)
- Walter Ino – guitar, keyboards, mandolin, backing vocals (2022–present)

== Discography ==
- Pattern-Seeking Animals (2019)
- Prehensile Tales (2020)
- Only Passing Through (2022)
- Spooky Action at a Distance (2023)
- Friend of all Creatures (2025)
- Grimalkin (2026)
