= Spock's Beard (album) =

Studio album by Spock's Beard
- Released: November 21, 2006
- Recorded: 2006
- Genre: Progressive rock
- Length: 77:14
- Label: InsideOut
- Producer: Spock's Beard

Spock's Beard chronology
Gluttons for Punishment (2005)	Spock's Beard (2006)	Live (2008)

Professional ratings
Review scores
Source	Rating
Metal Storm	(8.6/10)
Rock Hard	8.5/10 stars
Sea of Tranquility	4.5/5 stars

Spock's Beard is the ninth studio album by American progressive rock band Spock's Beard released on November 21, 2006.

On September 21, 2006, Dave Meros added the tentative track list to the band's website and said the following regarding the album's title: "As you probably know by now, we're calling our ninth studio release simply Spock's Beard. No big heavy reasoning behind that, really, it just seemed like a cool thing to do. (Of course, you are more than welcome to help us invent some heavy philosophical or hidden meaning so we'll have something interesting to say in interviews...There are a few cool song titles that could have become the CD title...but we've done that a lot before. Then there is the obvious 'SB9' and its variations, or the clever play on words thing, like 'nein' or 'asinine' or something like that."

Like its predecessors "A Guy Named Sid" (from Feel Euphoria) and "A Flash Before My Eyes" (from Octane), the individual sections of "As Far as the Mind Can See" are divided into separate tracks on the album.

== Track listing ==
No.	Title	Writer(s)	Length
1.	"On a Perfect Day"	Nick D'Virgilio, Alan Morse, Stan Ausmus, John Boegehold	7:46
2.	"Skeletons at the Feast"	Dave Meros, Boegehold	6:33
3.	"Is This Love"	D'Virgilio	2:51
4.	"All That's Left"	Boegehold, Meros	4:45
5.	"With Your Kiss"	D'Virgilio	11:46
6.	"Sometimes They Stay, Sometimes They Go"	Ausmus, Morse	4:31
7.	"The Slow Crash Landing Man"	Boegehold, Meros	5:47
8.	"Wherever You Stand"	Ryo Okumoto, D'Virgilio	5:09
9.	"Hereafter"	Boegehold, Okumoto	5:01
10.	"As Far As the Mind Can See: I. Dreaming in the Age of Answers"	Boegehold, Meros	4:44
11.	"As Far As the Mind Can See: II. Here's a Man"	Boegehold, Meros	3:28
12.	"As Far As the Mind Can See: III. They Know We Know"	Boegehold, Meros	3:15
13.	"As Far As the Mind Can See: IV. Stream of Unconsciousness"	Boegehold, Meros	5:22
14.	"Rearranged"	D'Virgilio	6:07

== Critical reception ==
With this release, critics recognized a shift to more of the classic Spock's Beard sound. Sea of Tranquility reported, "It sounds like Spock's Beard have refocused here a little bit, and while their last two albums were very strong, this latest is really something special. Capturing many of the elements that fans loved so much about their earlier material, plus adding in some new sounds, Spock's Beard is a triumph for a band that really needed something to reinvent, or reinvigorate, themselves to their fans."

== Personnel ==
- Nick D'Virgilio – lead and backing vocals, drums, timpani, percussion, electric and acoustic guitars
- Alan Morse – electric and acoustic guitars, backing vocals, lead vocals on "Sometimes They Stay, Sometimes They Go"
- Ryo Okumoto – keyboards, backing vocals
- Dave Meros – bass guitar, bass synth, sitar, backing vocals

Additional personnel

- Stan Ausmus – song co-writer
- John Boegehold – song co-writer
- Rich Mouser – mixing
