= Noise Floor =

Noise Floor may refer to:

- Noise floor, a term in signal measurement
- Noise Floor (Rarities: 1998–2005), an album by Bright Eyes
- Noise Floor (Spock's Beard album)
