= Beware of Darkness (album) =

Studio album by Spock's Beard
- Released: January 1996
- Recorded: 1995
- Genre: Progressive rock
- Length: 58:12
- Label: Metal Blade/Radiant (USA); InsideOut (Europe)
- Producer: Neal Morse, Spock's Beard

Spock's Beard chronology
| The Light (1995) | Beware of Darkness (1996) | Official Live Bootleg/The Beard Is out There (1996) |

Professional ratings
Review scores
| Source | Rating |
|---|---|
| AllMusic | 3/5 stars |
| Rock Hard | 10/10 stars |

Beware of Darkness is the second studio album by American progressive rock band Spock's Beard, released in January 1996. The album was the band's first release following the addition of keyboardist Ryo Okumoto. The album was named after the song of the same name, originally written and performed by George Harrison.

The album features several short songs, in contrast to their debut album The Light which consisted of just four lengthy tracks.

"Thoughts", inspired by Gentle Giant, is the first part of a cross-album suite, with follow-up parts being featured on the Spock's Beard albums V, Brief Nocturnes and Dreamless Sleep, and The Archaeoptimist, as well as the Neal Morse album Momentum.

The album has since been remastered and re-released by Radiant Records.

== Background ==
Beware of Darkness was Spock's Beard's first album to be written as a group; The Light, its predecessor, featured mostly songs written by vocalist, keyboardist and guitarist Neal Morse while he was still putting the band together. In preparation for gigs, Morse realized he wouldn't be able to play all keyboard parts alone, so Ryo Okumoto was invited to join the band.

The band had signed with Inside Out Music and had a recording budget for the first time; this prompted them to approach Kevin Gilbert to have him mix some of the songs. Because he was too expensive for them at that time, he only mixed three tracks: "Thoughts", "Walking on the Wind" and "Time Has Come". Morse was about to meet him to remix some songs by the time he was found dead.

The album is named after the George Harrison song, a cover of which also appears as the record's opener. However, Morse explains he actually based his rendition on Leon Russell's cover, and not the original version.

== Track listing ==
All songs written by Neal Morse, except where noted.

| No. | Title | Length |
|---|---|---|
| 1. | "Beware of Darkness" (George Harrison) | 5:42 |
| 2. | "Thoughts" | 7:10 |
| 3. | "The Doorway" | 11:35 |
| 4. | "Chatauqua" | 2:50 |
| 5. | "Walking on the Wind" | 9:09 |
| 6. | "Waste Away" | 5:21 |
| 7. | "Time Has Come" | 16:22 |
| Total length: | | 58:12 |

Bonus tracks on album reissue
| No. | Title | Length |
|---|---|---|
| 8. | "The Doorway" (Home demo) | 10:26 |
| 9. | "Beware of Darkness" (Home demo) | 5:12 |
| Total length: | | 73:50 |

== Personnel ==
- Neal Morse – lead vocals, piano, all synths, acoustic guitar, "bouzokui", "boring electric guitar parts"
- Alan Morse – "really fun electric guitar parts", cello, vocals, "Roddy McDowell impression"
- Dave Meros – fuzz bass, wash bass, fretless bass
- Nick D'Virgilio – drums, percussion, vocals
- Ryo Okumoto – Hammond organ, Mellotron
- Kevin Gilbert – guest artist, mixing, sound effects
- Wanda Houston – backing vocals
- Molly Pasutti – backing vocals
- Ken Love – mastering
- Frank Rosato – engineer
- John Woodhouse – engineer
