= The Light (Spock's Beard album) =

Studio album by Spock's Beard
- Released: January 1995
- Recorded: 1994
- Genre: Progressive rock
- Length: 57:03 (Original); 72:21 (Reissue)
- Label: Metal Blade; Radiant Records
- Producer: Neal Morse and Spock's Beard

Spock's Beard chronology
The Light (1995)	Beware of Darkness (1996)

Professional ratings
Review scores
Source	Rating
Allmusic	4.5/5 stars
Rock Hard	10/10 stars

The Light is the 1995 debut album by American progressive rock band Spock's Beard. The album features two different covers—one for its domestic release, and one for its European release. "The Light" has since become Spock's Beard's signature song. The album has since been remastered and re-released by Radiant Records.

== Background and writing ==
In 1991, Morse left the Los Angeles music club life and moved to Nashville, TN. Morse took a motivational weekend course and realized that "I got into music because I loved it and I wanted to do big pieces." Two weeks later, Morse wrote The Light, Go the Way You Go, and The Water. Morse then invited his brother Alan Morse to play along on the demos. The Morse brothers later met drummer Nick D'Virgilio at a bar open jam night and was invited to join the band along with Dave Meros.

The title track, The Light, also signals the birth of the "Neal Morse epic", a signature of his longform songwriting that remains to this day.

== Track listing ==
All songs written by Neal Morse except where noted.

No.	Title	Length
1.	"The Light": I. "The Dream"; II. "One Man" (Alan Morse, N. Morse); III. "Garden People"; IV. "Looking Straight into the Light"; V. "The Man in the Mountain"; VI. "Señor Valasco's Mystic Voodoo Love Dance"; VII. "The Return of the Horrible Catfish Man"; VIII. "The Dream"	15:32
2.	"Go the Way You Go"	12:07
3.	"The Water": I. "Introduction/The Water"; II. "When It All Goes to Hell"; III. "A Thief in the Night"; IV. "FU/I'm Sorry"; V. "The Water (Revisited)"; VI. "Runnin' the Race"; VII. "Reach for the Sky"	23:10
4.	"On the Edge"	6:14
Total length:		57:03

Bonus track on reissues
No.	Title	Length
5.	"The Light" (Home demo)	15:18
Total length:		72:21

== Critical reception ==
In 2017, Prog Sphere ranked The Light as the second best album in the Spock's Beard discography behind V.

The title track, The Light, was ranked as the second best Modern Prog Song of the 1990-2015 period by The Prog Report in 2017.

== Personnel ==
- Neal Morse - lead vocals, mellotron, hammond organ, all other keyboards, acoustic & electric guitar
- Alan Morse - lead electric guitar, cello, mellotron, vocals
- Dave Meros - bass, french horn
- Nick D'Virgilio - drums, percussion, backing vocals

Additional personnel

- Molly Pasutti and Wanda Houston - background vocals on "The Water"

Kevin Gilbert - Mastering

== Release details ==
- 1995, USA, SynPhonic, CD
- 1998, USA, Metal Blade ?, Release Date 8 September 1998, CD
- 2001, USA, Giant Electric Pea GEPCD1017, Release Date 30 July 2001, CD
- 2004, UK, SPV Records SPV08528200, Release Date 22 March 2004, CD
- 2004, UK, SPV Records SPV08728208, Release Date 17 May 2004, CD (Cover artwork special edition)
