= Day for Night (Spock's Beard album) =

Studio album by Spock's Beard
- Released: March 23, 1999
- Genre: Progressive rock, symphonic rock
- Length: 64:39
- Label: Metal Blade; Radiant Records
- Producer: Neal Morse and Spock's Beard

Spock's Beard chronology
The Kindness of Strangers (1998)	Day for Night (1999)	V (2000)

Professional ratings
Review scores
Source	Rating
AllMusic	4/5 stars
Sea of Tranquility	4/5 stars

Day for Night is the fourth studio album by American progressive rock band Spock's Beard released on March 23, 1999.

The multi-part epic "The Healing Colors of Sound" comprises tracks 8 through 13 on the album.

A CD single promoting the track "Skin" was subsequently released as well. The single contained 3 additional tracks: An edited version of "The Healing Colors of Sound", "Can't Get It Wrong", and also the Neal Morse track "Lost Cause", taken from his self-titled debut solo album.

== Track listing ==
All tracks are written by Neal Morse, except where noted.

No.	Title	Writer(s)	Length
1.	"Day for Night"		7:34
2.	"Gibberish"		4:18
3.	"Skin"		3:58
4.	"The Distance to the Sun"		5:11
5.	"Crack the Big Sky"		9:59
6.	"The Gypsy"		7:28
7.	"Can't Get It Wrong"	Nick D'Virgilio, Alan Morse, N. Morse	4:12
8.	"The Healing Colors of Sound" I. "The Healing Colors of Sound, Pt. 1" II. "My Shoes" III. "Mommy Comes Back" IV. "Lay It Down" V. "The Healing Colors of Sound, Pt. 2" VI. "My Shoes (Revisited)"		21:57
Total length:			64:39

European edition bonus track

1. "Hurt" – 3:08

Japanese edition bonus track

1. "Urban Noise" – 0:40
2. "June" – 6:11

== Personnel ==
- Neal Morse – lead vocals, piano, all synths, acoustic guitar
- Alan Morse – electric guitar, Mellotron, vocals
- Dave Meros – bass, vocals
- Nick D'Virgilio – drums, percussion, vocals
- Ryo Okumoto – Hammond organ, Mellotron

Additional musicians

- John Garr – Saxophone (5)
- Joy Worland – French horn (7–8)
- Eric Brenton, Tom Tally, John Krovoza – string section (8)
- Byron House – string bass and cello (2, 7)

Technical personnel

- Rich Mouser – mixing
