= The Kindness of Strangers (album) =

Studio album by Spock's Beard
- Released: May 19, 1998
- Recorded: 1997
- Genre: Progressive rock
- Length: 56:35 (Original); 78:38 (Reissue)
- Label: Metal Blade; Radiant Records
- Producer: Neal Morse and Spock's Beard

Spock's Beard chronology
Official Live Bootleg/The Beard Is out There (1996)	The Kindness of Strangers (1998)	Day for Night (1999)

Professional ratings
Review scores
Source	Rating
Allmusic	3.5/5 stars
Rock Hard	10/10 stars

The Kindness of Strangers is the third studio album by American progressive rock band Spock's Beard released on May 19, 1998.

This was the first full album to be mixed by Rich Mouser, who became the primary mixing engineer for Spock's Beard and later all of Morse's projects. The album has since been remastered and re-released by Radiant Records with 5 bonus tracks consisting of radio edits and demos.

== Track listing ==
All songs written by Neal Morse except where noted.

No.	Title	Length
1.	"The Good Don't Last" I. "Introduction" II. "The Good Don't Last" III. "The Radiant Is"	10:04
2.	"In the Mouth of Madness"	4:45
3.	"Cakewalk on Easy Street"	5:01
4.	"June"	5:29
5.	"Strange World"	4:20
6.	"Harm's Way"	11:05
7.	"Flow" (Neal Morse, Tony Ray) I. "True Believer" II. "A Constant Flow of Sound" III. "Into the Source"	15:48
Total length:		56:35

Bonus tracks on album reissue
No.	Title	Length
8.	"The Good Don't Last" (Radio edit)	3:24
9.	"In the Mouth of Madness" (Radio edit)	3:57
10.	"Cakewalk on Easy Street" (Radio edit)	4:01
11.	"June" (Home demo)	5:31
12.	"Strange World" (Home demo)	4:35
Total length:		72:21

== Personnel ==
- Neal Morse – lead vocals, piano, all synths, acoustic and an occasional electric guitar
- Alan Morse – main electric guitar, cello, Mellotron, vocals
- Dave Meros – bass guitar, vocals
- Nick D'Virgilio – drums, percussion, vocals
- Ryo Okumoto – Hammond organ, Mellotron

Technical personnel

- Rich Mouser – mixing
