= The Archaeoptimist =

Studio album by Spock's Beard
- Released: November 21, 2025
- Studio: Band members' home studios
- Genre: Progressive rock
- Length: 61:01
- Label: Madfish
- Producer: Ryo Okumoto

Spock's Beard chronology
Noise Floor (2018)	The Archaeoptimist (2025)

The Archaeoptimist is the fourteenth studio album by American progressive rock band Spock's Beard and the first to feature drummer and backing vocalist Nick Potters and songwriter Michael Whiteman. Produced by Ryo Okumoto, it was released on November 21, 2025, via the band's label Madfish.

== Background and recording ==
Keyboardist and producer Ryo Okumoto announced the album on his Facebook page on March 20, 2025, seven years after the band's previous release, Noise Floor (2018). To date, it represents the longest gap between Spock's Beard studio albums since the band formed in 1992. The album's first single, "Invisible," was released on September 12, 2025.

The album was originally planned as Okumoto's second solo album (following The Myth of the Mostrophus, 2022) under the working title "The Destructionist," but was later reworked into a Spock’s Beard release following the addition of drummer Nick Potters. Potters had previously played with Okumoto's solo band on Cruise to the Edge in 2024 and also served as Spock’s Beard's live drummer that same year.

To better reflect Spock's Beard's style, vocalist and songwriter Ted Leonard rewrote the title track. He cited inspiration from The Why Files, particularly an episode discussing pole-shift theory as a possible explanation for extinction events. Leonard described the song as telling the story of a father and daughter rebuilding after a global catastrophe, with the daughter’s optimism serving as a source of hope for their community.

The Archaeoptimist was mixed by longtime Spock's Beard audio engineer Rich Mouser, marking his first mixing project after his studio, The Mouse House, was destroyed in the 2025 Eaton Fire in Altadena, California. Band members recorded their parts remotely from their respective home studios.

The band debuted songs from the album live during a three-night engagement at Alva's Showroom in San Pedro, California, from January 31 to February 2, 2026, before embarking on a European tour that included the Netherlands, Germany, Sweden, and Norway.

== Reception ==
The Archaeoptimist received positive reviews and was included in Goldmine's list of the 11 best progressive rock albums of 2025. Writing for British magazine Prog, reviewer Gary Mackenzie described the album as "complex and multilayered without being bewildering," adding that "it does all feel rather special."

== Track listing ==
All music is composed by Ryo Okumoto and Michael Whiteman.

The Archaeoptimist track listing
No.	Title	Lyrics	Length
1.	"Invisible"	Alan Morse	6:33
2.	"Electric Monk"	Morse; Whiteman	6:16
3.	"Afourthoughts"	Whiteman	7:31
4.	"St. Jerome in the Wilderness"	Whiteman; Ted Leonard	8:46
5.	"The Archaeoptimist"	Leonard	20:57
6.	"Next Step"	Whiteman	10:58
Total length:			61:01

== Personnel ==
Credits adapted from the album's liner notes.

=== Spock's Beard ===
- Ted Leonard – lead vocals, guitar
- Alan Morse – guitar, vocals
- Ryo Okumoto – keyboard, production
- Dave Meros – bass
- Nick Potters – drums, vocals

=== Additional contributors ===
- Rich Mouser – mixing, mastering
- Michael Whiteman – additional acoustic guitar
- Carl Glover – album art
- Joey Frevola – additional drum tracking

== Charts ==
Chart performance for The Archaeoptimist
Chart (2025)	Peak position
French Physical Albums (SNEP)	130
French Rock & Metal Albums (SNEP)	33
Scottish Albums (Official Charts)	43
Swiss Albums (Schweizer Hitparade)	87
UK Albums Sales (OCC)	16
UK Independent Albums (Official Charts)	12
UK Rock & Metal Albums (Official Charts)	5
