= Here and There (TV series) =

- Genre: Documentary
- Country of origin: Canada
- Original language: English
- No. of seasons: 3

Production
- Running time: 30 minutes

Original release
- Network: CBC Television
- Release: 27 May 1955 – 22 November 1958

Here and There is a Canadian documentary television program that aired on CBC Television from 1955 to 1958.

== Premise ==
This series of documentaries concerning Canadian life featured various hosts and producers during its run. Each episode was dedicated to a single topic such as Atlantic ship construction, the Royal Canadian Mint and Canadian air force training. The approach was inspired by the Trans-Canada Network radio show Scene. Most episodes were filmed, with some live studio broadcasts in late 1958.

== Scheduling ==
This half-hour series was broadcast at various times (Eastern) as follows:

Day	Time	Season run
Sundays	10:30 p.m.	27 May to 16 September 1955
Sundays	12:00 p.m.	26 February to 20 May 1956
Sundays	10:30 p.m.	3 June to 16 September 1956
Sundays	1:00 p.m.	6 October 1956 – 5 May 1957
Wednesdays	10:00 p.m.	8 May to 25 September 1957
Saturdays	6:00 p.m.	5 October 1957 to 22 November 1958
