= V (Spock's Beard album) =

Studio album by Spock's Beard
- Released: August 22, 2000
- Studio: Lawnmower and Garden Supply, Pasadena, California
- Genre: Progressive rock, progressive metal
- Length: 62:59
- Label: Metal Blade; Radiant Records
- Producer: Spock's Beard and Neal Morse

Spock's Beard chronology
Day for Night (1999)	V (2000)	There & Here (2001)

Professional ratings
Review scores
Source	Rating
AllMusic	4/5 stars

V is the fifth studio album of progressive rock band Spock's Beard released on August 22, 2000.

The release of V also produced a CD single, this time promoting the track "All on a Sunday". The track itself was re-recorded in 2001 and is slightly different from the album track. Also on the single is an unreleased song called "The Truth", and the music video for "All on a Sunday".

This album is available as a limited edition as well, which contains a 32-page booklet that includes an interview with the band and a personal fact-sheet on all the band members, as well as a multimedia track showing the band in the studio.

== Background and writing ==
"Thoughts" is the second part of a cross-album suite, with other parts being featured on the Spock's Beard albums Beware of Darkness and Brief Nocturnes and Dreamless Sleep, and on the Neal Morse album Momentum.

The Great Nothing is the longest song written to date for the band and is autobiographical for Morse who wrote the song from the perspective of being a struggling musician, which is what led him to starting Spock's Beard in the first place. Morse said, “‘The Great Nothing’ I think I actually wrote in ‘97 and we didn’t record it until ’99, and V didn’t come out until maybe 2000. I wrote from the perspective of a depressed musician being revived by music again.”

== Critical reception ==
In 2017, Prog Sphere named V as the best Spock's Beard album in the discography.

In 2018, Classic Rock History named At the End of the Day and The Great Nothing in the top 10 essential Spock's Beard songs at #5 and #2.

== Track listing ==
All songs written by Neal Morse except where noted.

No.	Title	Writer(s)	Length
1.	"At the End of the Day"		16:28
2.	"Revelation"	Nick D'Virgilio, Alan Morse, N. Morse, Ryo Okumoto	6:04
3.	"Thoughts (Part II)"	A. Morse, N. Morse	4:39
4.	"All on a Sunday"		4:04
5.	"Goodbye to Yesterday"		4:40
6.	"The Great Nothing" I. "From Nowhere" II. "One Note" III. "Come Up Breathing" IV. "Submerged" V. "Missed Your Calling" VI. "The Great Nothing"		27:01
Total length:			62:59

== Personnel ==
- Neal Morse - lead vocals, piano, all synths, acoustic guitar
- Alan Morse - electric guitar, vocals, cello, sampler
- Dave Meros - bass, stand-up bass, French horn, vocals
- Nick D'Virgilio - drums, percussion, vocals
- Ryo Okumoto - Hammond organ, Mellotron

Additional personnel

- Katie Hagen - French horn
- Chris Carmichael - violin, viola, cello
- Kathy Ann Lord - English horn
- Joey Pippin - trumpet

Technical personnel

- Rich Mouser - mixing
