= Snow (Spock's Beard album) =

Studio album by Spock's Beard
- Released: August 27, 2002
- Recorded: Lawnmower and Garden Supply, Pasadena, California
- Genre: Progressive rock
- Length: 114:31
- Label: Metal Blade; Radiant Records
- Producer: Neal Morse and Spock's Beard

Spock's Beard chronology
V (2000)	Snow (2002)	Feel Euphoria (2003)

Professional ratings
Review scores
Source	Rating
AllMusic	3/5 stars
Rock Hard	9/10
Sea of Tranquility	5/5 stars

Snow is the sixth studio album of the progressive rock band Spock's Beard, and the final album with main songwriter and vocalist Neal Morse, who left immediately after the release of the album due to his conversion to Christianity. It was released in 2002 on Radiant Records.

A concept album, Snow tells the story of a young albino man named John “Snow” who possesses extraordinary spiritual and prophetic abilities. He grows up as an outcast but eventually embarks on a journey of self-discovery, gaining a following due to his wisdom and charisma. However, as he becomes more famous and influential, he struggles with the corrupting nature of power, as well as betrayal and personal crises.

Throughout the album, Snow experiences both triumphs and setbacks, eventually realizing that his purpose is not to seek external validation but to embrace his true self. The story explores themes of redemption, self-acceptance, and spiritual awakening, which became a hallmark of Neal Morse’s songwriting post-Spock's Beard.

Loudwire ranked Snow as the #1 prog album of the 2000s, writing, "Snow is the best album Spock’s Beard and Neal Morse ever made (together or separately), and it’s undoubtedly the defining prog rock LP of the decade."

On February 3, 2026, Neal announced on Facebook that Snow would be getting a vinyl re-release in March 2026, with signed copies available at Morsefest. The music was remastered by original sound engineer Rich Mouser for the re-release.

== Background and recording ==
Neal Morse began recording Snow in summer of 2001, when he flew from Tennessee to Los Angeles, California. Upon arrival, he wasn't satisfied with his recording of the album, and decided to re-write it, in order to create a decent concept piece. For that, he needed to fly back. He then returned with an almost completely rewritten version, which Dave Meros was surprised by, because he awaited the revised version. The group then completed recording it overnight, on September 10, 2001. The next day, Spock's Beard was scheduled to fly back to Tennessee, but due to the September 11 attacks, ended up stranded in the airport.

Spock's Beard decided to rent a car so they could get safely home. They listened to Bob Dylan and God Bless America (which was sung by Congress over the radio), and Neal got the idea for the album. Upon returning to Tennessee, Neal spent months polishing the concept and writing more songs, but upon returning to Los Angeles, he suffered an emotional wreck, and decided to quit the band, the announcement of which came nine months after the first recording of the album. He told his band members that he was a devoted Christian, and viewed the songs "Open Wide the Flood Gates," "Love Beyond Words," and "Wind at My Back" as prayers. He then had a hard time deciding whether to go with the band's ideology, or create his own solo album, with a focus on Christianity as its base. After the recording was complete, Neal said his farewells to the former band. Due to Neal's departure, the Snow tour was cancelled.

Neal and Nick D'Virgilio (who left Spock's Beard in 2014) returned to the band in 2016 for the Snow Live concert at Morsefest in Nashville, Tennessee. Snow Live was also performed once more in 2016 at the Night of the Prog festival in Loreley, Germany.

A single track, "Carrie," was performed in 2024 during Ryo Okumoto's set on Cruise to the Edge 2024. The performance included Okumoto on keyboards, D'Virgilio as lead vocals, and current Spock's Beard member Nick Potters on drums and backing vocals.

== Live release ==
On November 10, 2017, Spock's Beard released a live Blu-ray DVD version of the album via Metal Blade and Radiant Records. The DVD version contains both parts of the album, as well as encores "June" and "Falling for Forever", and a behind-the-scenes featurette "The Making of Snow Live."

== Track listing ==
All songs written by Neal Morse, except where noted.

=== Disc one ===
No.	Title	Writer(s)	Length
1.	"Made Alive/Overture"		5:32
2.	"Stranger in a Strange Land"		4:29
3.	"Long Time Suffering"		6:03
4.	"Welcome to NYC"		3:32
5.	"Love Beyond Words"		3:24
6.	"The 39th Street Blues (I'm Sick)"		4:05
7.	"Devil's Got My Throat"		7:17
8.	"Open Wide the Flood Gates"		6:14
9.	"Open the Gates Part 2"		3:02
10.	"Solitary Soul"	Alan Morse, N. Morse	7:33
11.	"Wind at My Back"		5:12
Total length:			56:23

=== Disc two ===
No.	Title	Writer(s)	Length
1.	"Second Overture"	Spock's Beard	3:47
2.	"4th of July"	Spock's Beard	3:11
3.	"I'm the Guy"		4:48
4.	"Reflection"		2:49
5.	"Carie"		3:06
6.	"Looking for Answers"	Nick D'Virgilio	5:17
7.	"Freak Boy"		2:12
8.	"All Is Vanity"		4:35
9.	"I'm Dying"		5:09
10.	"Freak Boy Part 2"		3:01
11.	"Devil's Got My Throat Revisited"		1:55
12.	"Snow's Night Out"		2:04
13.	"Ladies and Gentlemen, Mister Ryo Okumoto on the Keyboards"		2:40
14.	"I Will Go"		5:08
15.	"Made Alive Again/Wind at My Back"		7:01
Total length:			58:08

Special Edition Bonus Tracks
No.	Title	Length
16.	"Snow Overture"	3:37
17.	"Snow Demo Excerpt"	12:23
18.	"Wind at My Back (Acoustic)"	5:45

=== Disc three ===
The Special Limited Edition of this album contains a third disc, made of acoustic tracks, work-in-progress and a cover ("South Side of the Sky", originally on the Yes album Fragile)

No.	Title	Writer(s)	Length
1.	"South Side of the Sky"	Jon Anderson, Chris Squire	9:11
2.	"The Good Don't Last/Open Wide the Flood Gates (Live acoustic)"		11:26
3.	"Working on 'Devil/Fiddly/Disco"		4:41
4.	"Looking for Answers (Live acoustic)"		4:59
5.	"Stranger in a Strange Land (Demo)"		2:34
6.	"4 O'Clock"		0:24
7.	"Working on Ryo's Solo"		7:42
8.	"Lost Bass Solo"		2:01
9.	"The Light (Live acoustic)"		6:08
10.	"Working on I Will Go"		2:10

== Personnel ==
- Neal Morse – lead vocals, piano, synths, acoustic guitar
- Alan Morse – electric guitars, vocals, cello
- Ryo Okumoto – hammond organ, mellotron, jupiter 8, minimoog, vocoder
- Dave Meros – bass, vocals, French horn
- Nick D'Virgilio – drums, percussion, vocals, lead vocals on "Carie" and "Looking for Answers"

Production

- Chris Carmichael – violin, viola, cello
- Jim Hoke – saxophone, clarinet, autoharp
- Neil Rosengarden – flugelhorn, trumpet
- Molly Pasutti – backing vocals on "Open the Gates Part 2"
- Rich Mouser – mixing

== See also ==
Snow was unofficially adapted into a live musical, Snow: the Modern Opera, and performed in 2012 by a small theater group in New Hampshire.
