= Concert Live =

Defunct UK record label

Concert Live was an instant live music recording company based in London, United Kingdom. The company produced live album sets that were recorded and mixed instantly and made available for fans to pick up after attending a concert. Founded in 2005 by Adam Goodyer and James Perkins, the company's first live recording was of Gang of Four and recorded over 500 concerts from artists and bands including Elton John, Madness, Kiss, Alice Cooper, Kasabian, Public Image Ltd, Thin Lizzy, Ronan Keating, Sia and Robbie Williams.

The company was dissolved in 2023.

== Album production ==
Concert Live signed deals with record companies allowing them to create and sell the live recordings. Live album sets were available for fans to pick up after attending a concert, recorded from the concert. Shows were recorded on the night by sound engineers and the extracted audio was burned onto CDs, while the performance continued. The result was a live album, featuring pre-made artwork and covers.
