= X (Spock's Beard album) =

Studio album by Spock's Beard
- Released: May 1, 2010
- Recorded: 2009–2010
- Studio: The Mouse House in Altadena, California, US; Clear Lake Audio, North Hollywood, California, US
- Genre: Progressive rock
- Length: 79:49
- Label: Mascot
- Producer: Spock's Beard

Spock's Beard chronology
Live (2008)	X (2010)	Live at High Voltage Festival (2011)

Professional ratings
Review scores
Source	Rating
Rock Hard	8/10 stars
Sputnik Music	4/5 stars
Sea of Tranquility	4/5 stars

X is the tenth studio album by American progressive rock band Spock's Beard. Similar to what Marillion did for Anoraknophobia, the album was funded by pre-orders of a limited edition of the album before the album was recorded. Those who ordered the album's "Ultra Package" had their names listed in the CD booklet and included as part of the track "Their Names Escape Me", which is exclusive to the limited edition. The album was released independently in May 2010. A retail and digital release with Mascot Records was released in August 2010. This album is the last studio album recorded with Nick D'Virgilio performing lead vocals, who left the band on November 18, 2011, to focus on other commitments.

== Critical reception ==
The X release continued the shift back to the classic Spock's Beard sound and is considered the strongest of the Nick D'Virgilio era releases. Sputnik Music said, "X is a winner on all fronts. It’s truly a triumph and a further validation of their post-Morse configuration. Spock’s Beard had rediscovered the spark that had made them so great before: every song is carefully elaborated and flows very well." Metal Reviews reported, "X is without a doubt the band’s best record with this line-up and can be easily added into the upper echelon of their works overall."

== Track listing ==
No.	Title	Lyrics	Music	Length
1.	"Edge of the In-Between"	John Boegehold	Dave Meros	10:30
2.	"The Emperor's Clothes"	Alan Morse	A. Morse, Neal Morse, Larry Kutcher	6:01
3.	"Kamikaze"	Instrumental	Ryo Okumoto	4:15
4.	"From the Darkness" I. "The Darkness" II. "Chance Meeting" (add. lyrics by A. Morse) III. "On My Own" IV. "Start Over Again"	Nick D'Virgilio	D'Virgilio	16:53
5.	"The Quiet House"	Boegehold	Meros	9:14
6.	"Their Names Escape Me"	Boegehold	Boegehold, Meros	8:51
7.	"The Man Behind the Curtain"	A. Morse	A. Morse, Stan Ausmus	7:46
8.	"Jaws of Heaven I. "Homesick for the Ashes" II. "Words of War" III. "Deep in the Wondering" IV. "Whole Again"	Boegehold	Meros, Boegehold	16:22

Notes
The above track listing is for the special edition. There are a few changes with the standard edition:

- "The Emperor's Clothes" and "Kamikaze" are swapped over in the track listing.
- "From the Darkness" has a slightly longer running time of 17:09.
- "Their Names Escape Me" is not included.

== Personnel ==
- Nick D'Virgilio – lead and backing vocals, drums, additional guitars
- Alan Morse – guitars, backing vocals
- Ryo Okumoto – keyboards
- Dave Meros – bass guitar, backing vocals, additional keyboards

Additional personnel

- Stan Ausmus – songwriting
- John Boegehold – additional keyboards, guitar, vocals, songwriting
- Jimmy Keegan – backing vocals

Production

- Rich Mouser – recording, mixing, mastering
