= Feel Euphoria =

Studio album by Spock's Beard
- Released: July 8, 2003
- Recorded: 2003
- Genre: Progressive rock
- Length: 63:53 (74:04 with bonus tracks)
- Label: InsideOut Music
- Producer: Spock's Beard

Spock's Beard chronology
Snow (2002)	Feel Euphoria (2003)	Octane (2005)

Professional ratings
Review scores
Source	Rating
Allmusic	2/5 stars
Rock Hard	8.5/10 stars
Sputnik Music	2.5/5 stars

Feel Euphoria is the seventh studio album by American progressive rock band Spock's Beard released on July 8, 2003. It was the first album the band recorded following the departure of vocalist/songwriter Neal Morse, also the first full-length album to feature drummer Nick D'Virgilio as lead vocalist. It marked the beginning of a more band-oriented era of songwriting, as before Neal Morse had written the bulk of the band's material, now all of the remaining band members wrote for the band, including bass player Dave Meros, who picked up his first songwriting credit in the history of the band (other than full-group credits) on the song "Ghosts of Autumn".

Tracks 7 through 12 comprise the suite "A Guy Named Sid".

== Track listing ==
No.	Title	Writer(s)	Length
1.	"Onomatopoeia"	Nick D'Virgilio, Alan Morse, John Boegehold	5:16
2.	"The Bottom Line"	D'Virgilio, Stan Ausmus	7:33
3.	"Feel Euphoria"	D'Virgilio, Ryo Okumoto	7:20
4.	"Shining Star"	D'Virgilio	4:04
5.	"East of Eden, West of Memphis"	Morse, Boegehold	7:05
6.	"Ghosts of Autumn"	Dave Meros, Boegehold	6:55
7.	"A Guy Named Sid: Intro"	D'Virgilio	3:00
8.	"Same Old Story"	D'Virgilio	4:25
9.	"You Don't Know"	D'Virgilio	3:11
10.	"Judge"	D'Virgilio	3:20
11.	"Sid's Boys Choir"	D'Virgilio	1:09
12.	"Change"	D'Virgilio	5:18
13.	"Carry On"	Morse, Ausmus, Boegehold	5:17
Total length:			63:53

Special edition bonus tracks

1. "Moth of Many Flames" (Morse, Boegehold) – 2:49
2. "From the Messenger" (Okumoto) – 7:25

== Critical reception ==
With the departure of Morse, a change in sound was noted by many critics. Sea of Tranquility reported, "Two, maybe three, tracks are almost unrecognizable as Spock's Beard songs", and Sputnik Music said Morse's departure drastically affected the band's sound due to new way of writing music for the group. Proggnosis reported, "this cd should almost be addressed as an entirely different band, with the same name of course."

== Personnel ==
- Nick D'Virgilio – lead vocals, drums, acoustic & some electric guitars, percussion, loops
- Alan Morse – electric and acoustic guitars, vocals
- Ryo Okumoto – keyboards
- Dave Meros – basses

Additional personnel

- Stan Ausmus – songwriting
- John Boegehold – songwriting, synths and "backward stuff" on "East of Eden, West of Memphis"
- Gina Ballina – french horn
- Claire Pasquale – trumpet & piccolo trumpet
- Steve Velez – cello
- J'Anna Jacoby – violin on "Carry On"

== Production ==
- Arranged & produced by Spock's Beard
- Recorded, engineered & mixed by Richard Mouser
- Mastered by Jay Frigoletto
