= Octane (Spock's Beard album) =

Studio album by Spock's Beard
- Released: January 25, 2005
- Recorded: 2004
- Genre: Progressive rock
- Length: 55:49
- Label: InsideOut
- Producer: Spock's Beard

Spock's Beard chronology
Feel Euphoria (2003)	Octane (2005)	Gluttons for Punishment (2005)

Octane is the eighth studio album by American progressive rock band Spock's Beard, released on 25 January 2005. The first seven tracks form a complete piece of work, "A Flash Before My Eyes", that tells the story of a man involved in a car accident who relives his memories in the moments following the crash.

A special edition release contained a second disc which contained five new tracks, outtakes from "A Flash Before My Eyes" and a video documenting the making of the album.

== Critical reception ==
Professional ratings
Review scores
Source	Rating
Allmusic	3/5 stars
Classic Rock	3/5 stars
Rock Hard	8.5/10 stars

With Octane, the band continued on a similar path as Feel Euphoria with a shift from progressive rock to a more straight-ahead rock sound. As a result, Octane has received generally average reviews since its release.

== Track listing ==
Octane
No.	Title	Writer(s)	Length
1.	"The Ballet of the Impact" I. "Prelude to the Past" II. "The Ultimate Quiet" III. "A Blizzard of My Memories"	Dave Meros, John Boegehold	5:34
2.	"I Wouldn't Let It Go"	Alan Morse, Boegehold	4:53
3.	"Surfing Down the Avalanche"	Nick D'Virgilio, Meros, Boegehold	3:43
4.	"She Is Everything" I. "Strange What You Remember" II. "Words of Forever"	Meros, Boegehold	6:46
5.	"Climbing Up That Hill"	Meros, Boegehold	3:31
6.	"Letting Go"	Ryo Okumoto	1:52
7.	"Of the Beauty of It All I. "If I Could Paint a Picture" II. "Into the Great Unknowable"	Meros, Boegehold	4:53
8.	"NWC"	D'Virgilio	4:16
9.	"There Was a Time"	Morse, Boegehold	4:58
10.	"The Planet's Hum"	D'Virgilio, Morse, Stan Ausmus	4:42
11.	"Watching the Tide"	D'Virgilio	5:07
12.	"As Long as We Ride"	D'Virgilio, Morse, Boegehold	5:34
Total length:			55:49

Special Edition Bonus Disc
No.	Title	Writer(s)	Length
1.	"When She's Gone"	D'Virgilio, Meros, Boegehold	5:41
2.	"Follow Me to Sleep"	D'Virgilio, Boegehold	5:39
3.	"Game Face"	D'Virgilio, Okumoto	4:10
4.	"Broken Promise Land"	Morse, Boegehold	4:45
5.	"Listening to the Sky"	Okumoto	3:08
6.	"Someday I'll Be Found" (String quartet, Flash #2)		1:04
7.	"I Was Never Lost" (Background vocals, Flash #2)		1:09
8.	"Paint Me a Picture" (Pipe organ outtake from Flash)		1:29
9.	"The Formulation of Octane" (Video)

== Personnel ==
Spock's Beard

- Nick D'Virgilio – lead vocals, drums, percussion, loops, electric guitar and acoustic guitar
- Alan Morse – guitar, theremin, saw, backing vocals
- Ryo Okumoto – keyboards
- Dave Meros – bass

Additional musicians

- Eric Gorfain – violin
- Daphne Chen – violin
- Leah Katz – viola
- Richard Dodd – cello
- Gina Ballina – French horn
- Johnnie Corno – French horn
- Ramón Flores – trumpet

Additional credits

- Stan Ausmus – songwriting
- John Boegehold – songwriting, string and horn arrangement
- Rich Mouser – mixing
- Jay Frigoletto – mastering
- Thomas Ewerhard – artwork
