= Nick D'Virgilio =

American musician (born 1968)

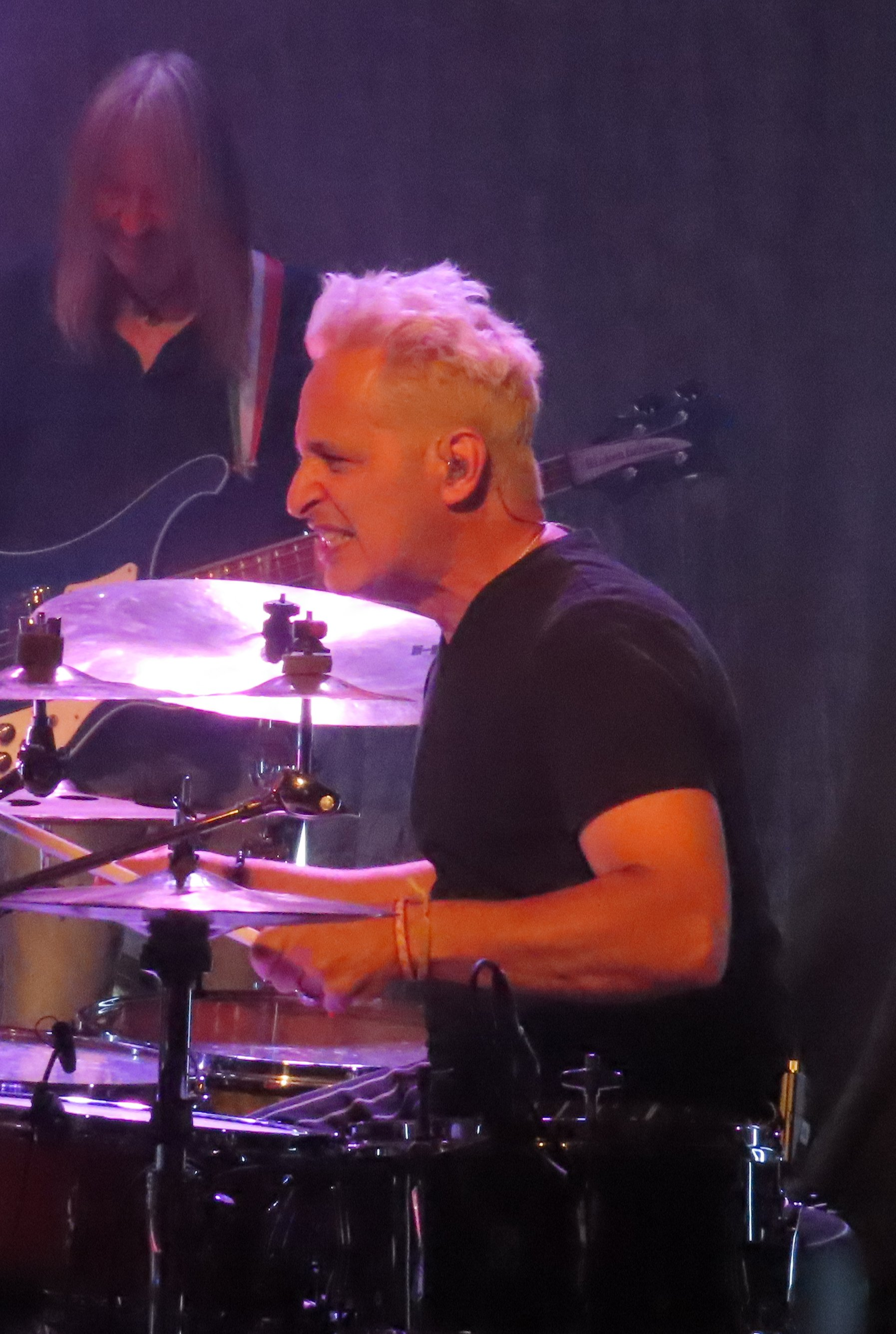
- D'Virgilio with Big Big Train in 2024

Background information
- Born: Nicholas Adam D'Virgilio; November 12, 1968 (age 57); Whittier, California, U.S.
- Genres: Progressive rock; hard rock; progressive metal; pop rock
- Occupations: Musician; singer
- Instruments: Drums; vocals; guitar; keyboards
- Years active: 1992–present
- Member of: Big Big Train; The Fringe; D'Virgilio, Morse & Jennings; Mr. Big
- Formerly of: Spock's Beard; Steve Hackett band; Fates Warning
- Website: nickdvirgilio.com

Nicholas Adam D'Virgilio (born November 12, 1968), often abbreviated and referred to as NDV, is an American musician and singer, best known as a member of the progressive rock band Spock's Beard. He was also one of two drummers chosen to replace Phil Collins in Genesis on the Calling All Stations album. He has performed session work with many artists including Tears for Fears and Mystery, and is an official member of Big Big Train.

== Career ==
=== Spock's Beard (1992–2011, 2017–2018) ===
D'Virgilio was the drummer in Spock's Beard since the band began in the early 1990s. After Neal Morse left in 2002, D'Virgilio took over on lead vocals and became their frontman during live performances. In this line-up, Spock's Beard subsequently recorded four albums, Feel Euphoria, Octane, the self-titled Spock's Beard, and X, prior to D'Virgilio's departure in 2011.

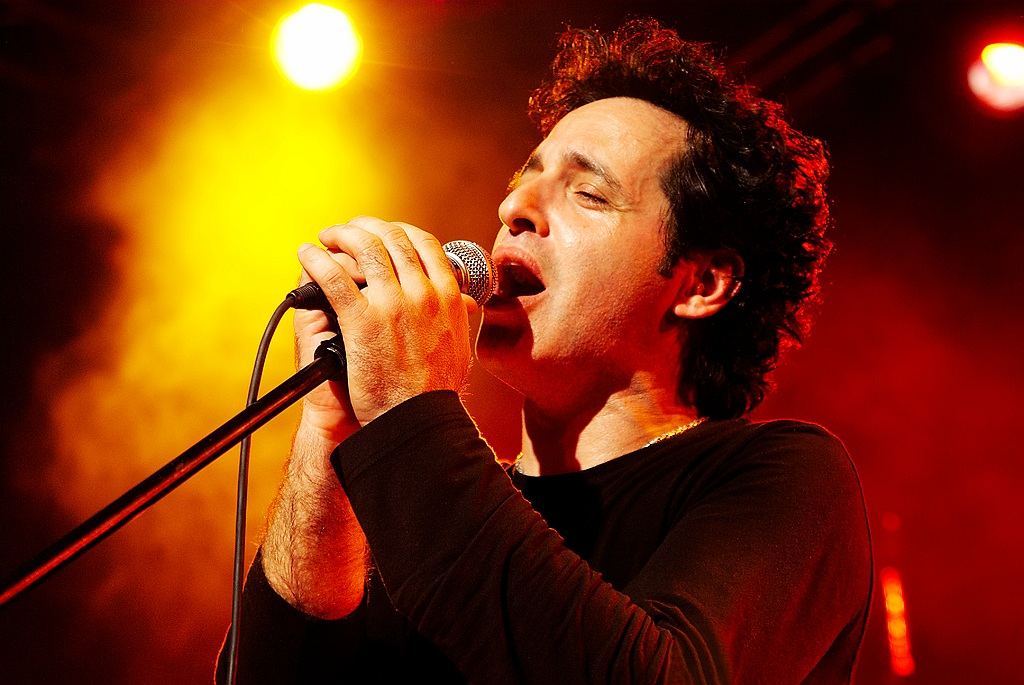
D'Virgilio performing with Spock's Beard in 2007

On July 26, 2011, D'Virgilio released a solo EP called Pieces. He performed a show in Quebec City, Canada performing the EP in its entirety with local musicians on the day of the album release.

On November 18, 2011, D'Virgilio announced that he had left Spock's Beard, because of his work with Cirque du Soleil. He noted, "It is very hard for me to write this, but as all good things come to an end at sometime or another, unfortunately I have to tell you all that my time with Spock's Beard has come to a close."

Later in 2014, D'Virgilio left Cirque du Soleil due to show cutbacks and joined Sweetwater Sound in August as a drum ambassador "where he creates how-to content, demonstration videos, and product reviews. He also teaches music and pro audio classes and serves as the Sweetwater Studios' first-call session drummer."

In July 2016, D'Virgilio and Neal Morse joined Spock's Beard for the only two performances of the album Snow, first at Morsefest on July 2 and then for Night of the Prog, in Loreley, Germany on July 15.

=== Kevin Gilbert (1994–1999) ===
In 1994, D'Virgilio joined Kevin Gilbert's reformed band Giraffe for a one-off performance of the Genesis piece "The Lamb Lies Down on Broadway" at Progfest '94. In 1995, he performed drums as part of Gilbert's touring band, Thud, which recorded a live album, Live at the Troubadour, released in 1999. After Gilbert's death in 1996, D'Virgilio was asked by Gilbert's estate to complete his second solo album, The Shaming of the True, based on the extant tapes and Gilbert's notes, which was released posthumously in 2000. On the album, D'Virgilio contributes drums, percussion, bass, guitar, keyboards and backing vocals. In November 2002, D'Virgilio headlined ProgWest in Claremont, California and played the entire The Shaming of the True album live in a band consisting of other friends and colleagues of Gilbert's.

In 2008, video tapes of the Troubadour concert were uncovered for the first time, leading to a DVD, entitled Welcome to Joytown – Thud Live at The Troubadour, released in 2009.

=== Big Big Train (2007–present) ===
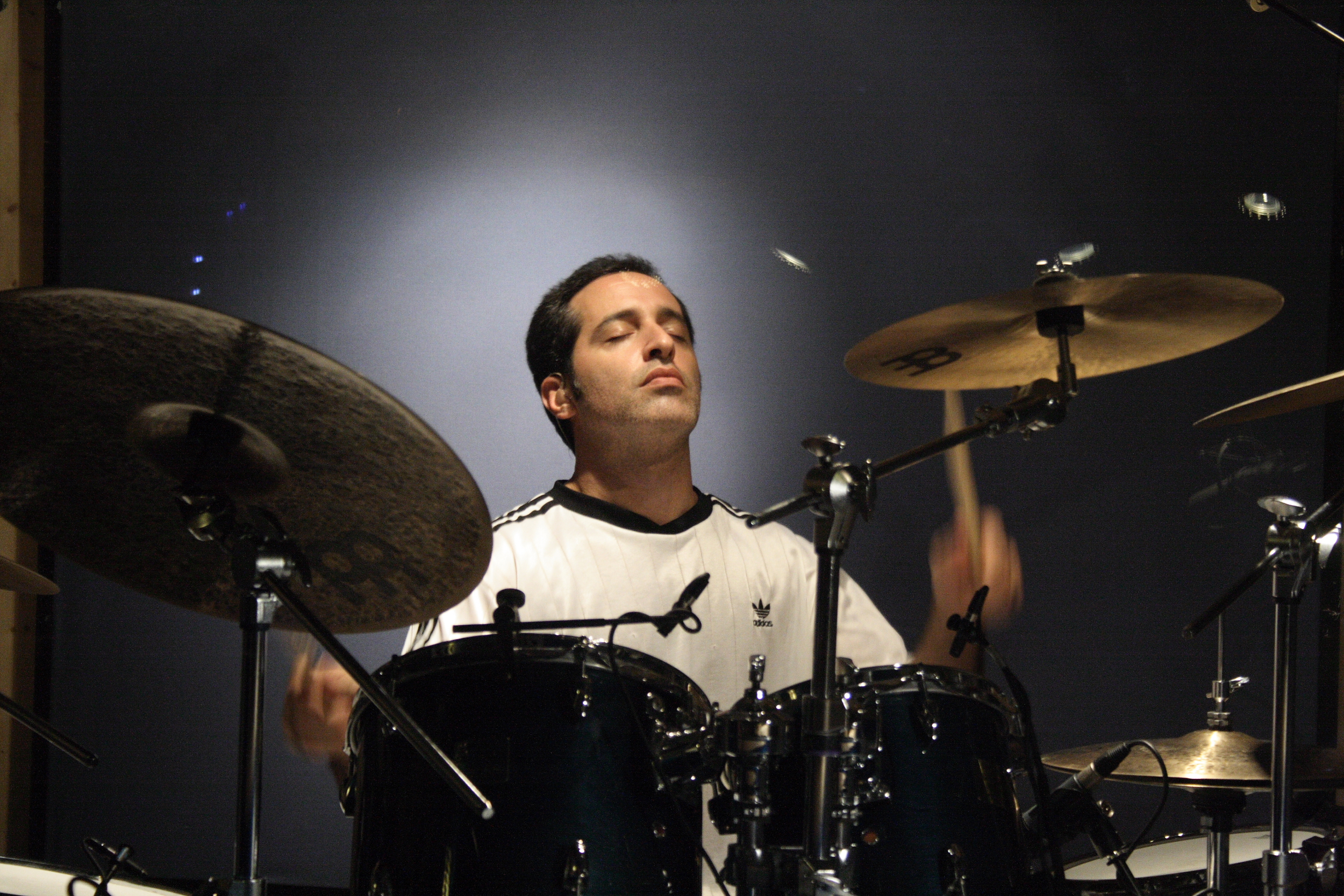
D'Virgilio with Big Big Train in 2007.

After guesting on three tracks on Big Big Train's 2007 album The Difference Machine, D'Virgilio was billed as a "permanent guest" on The Underfall Yard (2009) and subsequently joined the band as a full member, appearing on all of the band's releases since, and also performing live with the band since 2014 when they returned to live performances.

In 2024, he committed to the band's touring schedule when it conflicted with Mr. Big's.

=== Other bands ===
A lifelong fan of the progressive rock band Genesis, D'Virgilio was given an opportunity by the band to replace Phil Collins on drums for their 1997 album Calling All Stations. D'Virgilio split percussion duties with Nir Zidkyahu during work on the album. D'Virgilio had been a full member of the Mike Keneally Band from 2001 to 2004, playing on the tour supporting Keneally's 2000 album Dancing and later providing drums and vocals on the 2004 album Dog, as can be seen on the DVD included as part of the Dog Special Edition in both live and "making-of" studio footage. Previous Keneally drummer Joe Travers took D'Virgilio's place in the band for the subsequent Guitar Therapy tour.

D'Virgilio's first solo album, Karma, was recorded in 2001 at Kevin Gilbert's former studio, Lawnmower and Garden Supplies Studio, in Pasadena. The album included performances by Mike Keneally and Bryan Beller, D'Virgilio's bandmates in The Mike Keneally Band. D'Virgilio also served as the chief engineer on Beller's solo album View, recorded at the same studio as Karma.

D'Virgilio filled in for Mark Zonder on Fates Warning's summer tour with Dream Theater and Queensrÿche in 2003. Zonder's prior commitments prevented him from taking part in the tour, and he ceased performing with the band following its 2005 release FWX due to a reported aversion to touring. D'Virgilio played with the band on a handful of gigs supporting that album and appeared on the 2006 DVD release Live in Athens. D'Virgilio also appeared on Jordan Rudess's 2007 album The Road Home.

In early 2014, D'Virgilio appeared on Roy Strattman's album The Lie of the Beholder, stating: "Recording the drums for Roy's record was a total blast. I am really honored that he asked me to be a part of his new musical adventure. The record rocks and, from a drummer's perspective, I got to hit 'em hard and got challenged by the songs, two things drummers love. I really enjoyed the whole process and the music."

In August 2016, rock trio The Fringe released its self-titled debut album, featuring D'Virgilio on drums and vocals, Jonas Reingold of The Flower Kings on bass and backing vocals, and Randy McStine (Lo-Fi Resistance) on vocals and guitars.

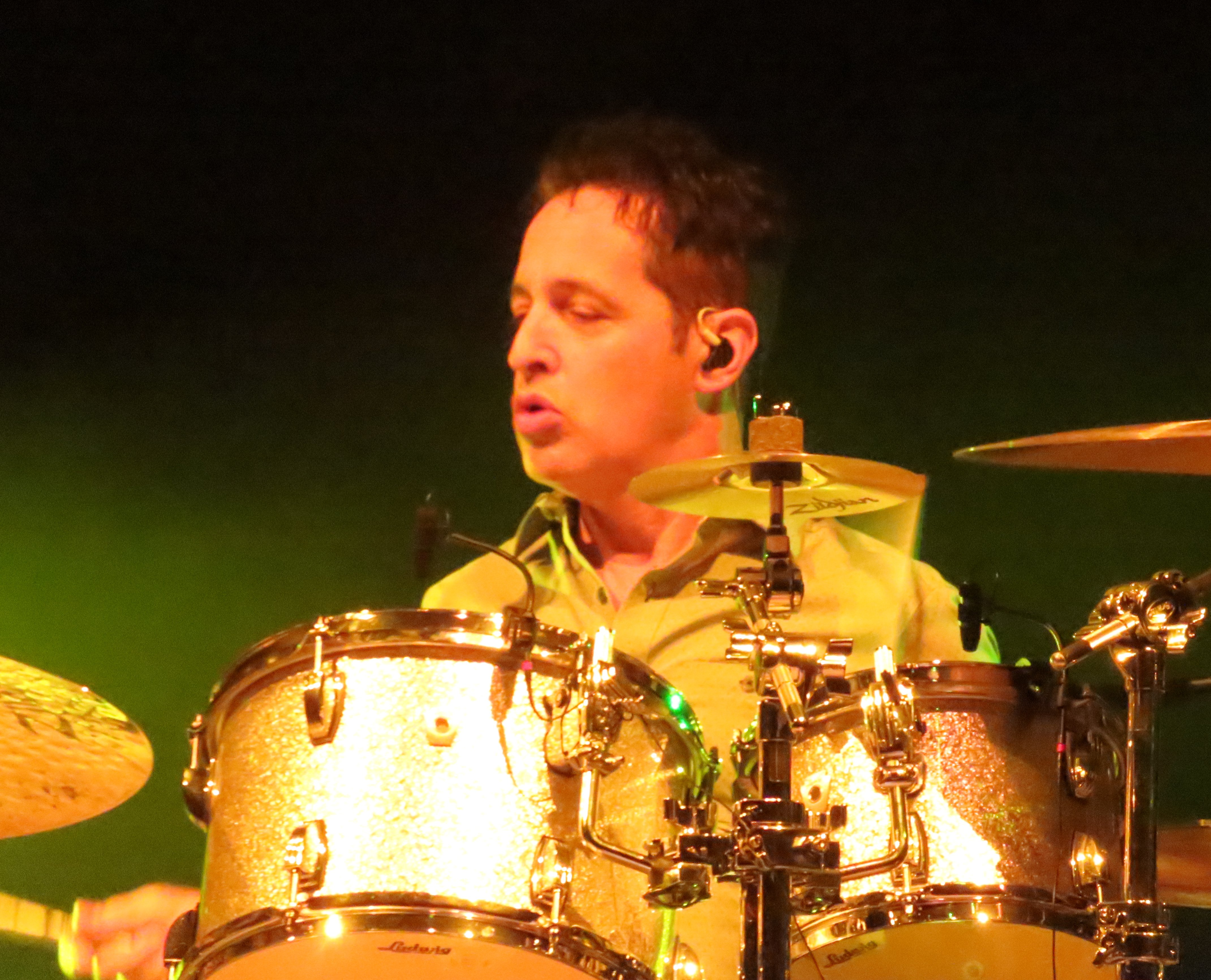
D'Virgilio in 2019

In 2018, it was announced that D'Virgilio had returned to Spock's Beard as their recording drummer following the departure of Jimmy Keegan. He appears on their thirteenth studio release, Noise Floor. In 2024, D'Virgilio d a surprise vocal performance of "Carrie" from the Snow album on Cruise to the Edge, with current Spock's Beard member Nick Potters on drums.

In 2020, D'Virgilio released his first solo album in nine years, Invisible. The album was recorded at Sweetwater Sound with the string and brass sections recorded at Abbey Road Studios. D'Virgilio wrote the concept during his time in the booth while touring with the Cirque Du Soleil showTotem.

In 2023, it was announced that he would be performing as the drummer for Mr. Big on their "BIG Finish Tour."

In 2025, D'Virgilio toured with Steve Hackett. In January 2025, NDV left Sweetwater to join the Gretsch Drums staff becoming their Digital Marketing and Content Creation Manager according to the Gretsch Drums Facebook page.

== Personal life ==
D'Virgilio lives in Fort Wayne, Indiana with his wife Tiffany and his two children Anthony and Sophia.

== Discography ==
=== Solo albums ===
- Karma (2001)
- Pieces (EP) (2011)
- Invisible (2020)

=== With D'Virgilio, Morse & Jennings ===
- Troika (2022)
- Sophomore (2023)

=== With Spock's Beard ===
Studio albums

Main article: Spock's Beard discography
- The Light (1995)
- Beware of Darkness (1996)
- The Kindness of Strangers (1998)
- Day for Night (1999)
- V (2000)
- Snow (2002)
- Feel Euphoria (2003)
- Octane (2005)
- Spock's Beard (2006)
- X (2010)
- Noise Floor (2018)

Live albums

- Official Live Bootleg/The Beard Is out There (1996, recorded 1995)
- Live at the Whisky and NEARfest (1999)
- Don't Try This at Home (April 2000, recorded 1999)
- Nick 'n Neal live in Europe - Two Separate Gorillas (October 2000) (From the Vaults, Series 2)
- Don't Try This @ Home Either (2000, recorded 1999) (From the Vaults, Series 3)
- There and Here (2000) (live – From the Vaults, Series 4)
- The Beard Is Out There-Live (2003)
- Gluttons for Punishment (2005)
- Live (2008)
- Snow Live (2017, recorded 2016)

=== With Big Big Train ===
- The Difference Machine (2007)
- The Underfall Yard (2009)
- Far Skies Deep Time (2010)
- English Electric Part One (2012)
- English Electric Part Two (2013)
- Make Some Noise (2013)
- English Electric: Full Power (2013)
- Wassail (2015)
- Folklore (2016)
- Grimspound (2017)
- The Second Brightest Star (2017)
- Grand Tour (2019)
- Common Ground (2021)
- Welcome to the Planet (2022)
- Ingenious Devices (2023)
- The Likes of Us (2024)
- Woodcut (2026)

=== With The Fringe ===
- The Fringe (2016)

=== Other collaborations ===
Year	Artist	Title	Notes
1997	Genesis	Calling All Stations	drums on four tracks
2001	Roland Orzabal	Tomcats Screaming Outside	drums
2002	Kaviar	The Kaviar Sessions	bass and drums
2003	Mike Keneally Band	A Fair Forgery of Pink Floyd	as member of Mike Keneally Band on Astronomy Domine
2004	Mike Keneally Band	Dog	drums
2005	Fates Warning	Live in Athens	drums
2006	Tears For Fears	Secret World Live in Paris	drums on live tracks and one studio tracks
2007	Amaran's Plight	Voice in The Light	drums
2008	Rewiring Genesis	A Tribute to the Lamb Lies Down on Broadway	drums, percussion, lead and backing vocals and production
2008	Martin Orford	The Old Road	drums, and or tambouring on 8 tracks
2010	Aeon Zen	The Face of the Unknown	vocals on one track
2010	Frost*	The Philadelphia Experiment	drums and vocals on all tracks
2012	Mystery	The World Is a Game	drums
2013	Cosmograf	The Man Left in Space	drums on four tracks
2014	Cosmograf	Capacitor	drums on all tracks
2014	Strattman	The Lie of the Beholder	drums on all tracks
2014	Dave Kerzner	New World	drums
2016	Cosmograf	The Unreasonable Silence	drums
2016	The Dreaming Street	The Dreaming Street	
2017	Carl Verheyen	Essential Blues	drums and percussion
2019	Neal Morse	Jesus Christ The Exorcist	vocals of Judas Iscariot
2019	Steve Hackett	At the Edge of Light	drums on one track
2024	Steve Hackett	The Circus and the Nightwhale	
2024	Mr. Big	Ten	
2025	Karmakanic	Transmutation	
