= Spock's Beard =

American progressive rock band

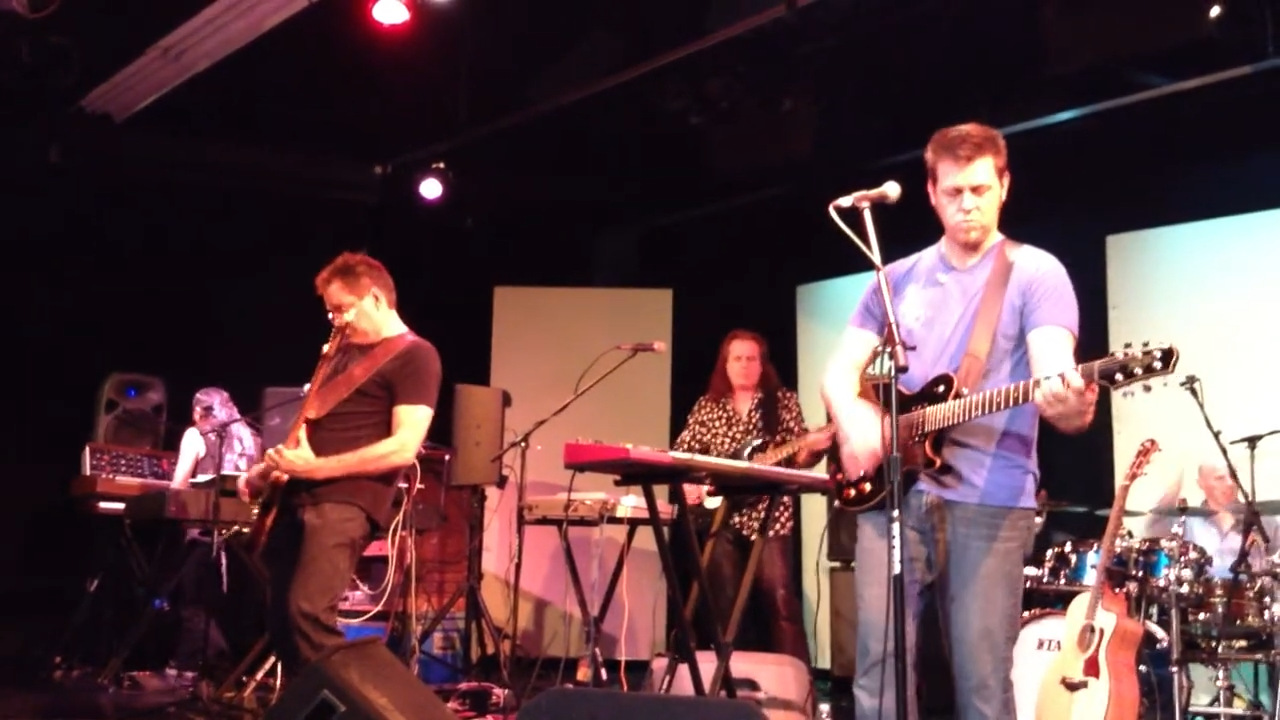
- Spock's Beard in 2013; L–R: Ryo Okumoto, Alan Morse, Dave Meros, Ted Leonard and Jimmy Keegan

Background information
- Origin: Los Angeles, U.S.
- Genre: Progressive rock
- Years active: 1992–present
- Labels: Madfish; Metal Blade/Radiant; Mascot; Inside Out
- Spinoffs: Pattern-Seeking Animals
- Members: Alan Morse; Dave Meros; Ryo Okumoto; Ted Leonard; Nick Potters
- Past members: John Ballard; Nick D'Virgilio; Neal Morse; Jimmy Keegan
- Website: spocksbeard.com

Spock's Beard is an American progressive rock band from Los Angeles, formed in 1992 by brothers Neal (lead vocals, keyboards, guitar) and Alan Morse (guitars), John Ballard (bass), and Nick D'Virgilio (drums). Ballard was replaced by Dave Meros before the release of their debut album, The Light (1995), and Ryo Okumoto (keyboards) joined soon after. Neal Morse left the band following the release of their sixth album, Snow (2002), and D'Virgilio took over as the band's frontman. In 2011, D'Virgilio also left and was replaced by Jimmy Keegan (drums) and Ted Leonard (lead vocals), from Brief Nocturnes and Dreamless Sleep (2013) onwards. Keegan departed the band in 2016, and drummer Nick Potters joined ahead of their fourteenth studio album, The Archaeoptimist.

Four of their first six albums have featured in the Prog Report's "Top 50 Prog Albums 1990–2015", with The Light and Snow featuring in the top ten.

== History ==
=== Neal Morse era (1992–2002) ===
Spock's Beard was formed in Los Angeles in 1992 by brothers Neal and Alan Morse. Both had played together in bands in the 1980s and initially intended for their new project to be just the two of them, with Neal on vocals and keyboards and Alan on guitar. They soon decided to form a full band and recruited drummer Nick D'Virgilio after meeting him at a blues jam in Los Angeles. John Ballard, a friend of Neal's, was brought in to play bass but was replaced by Dave Meros before the band began recording demos for their first album. The group's name is a reference to the 1967 "Mirror, Mirror" episode of Star Trek. According to Alan Morse:

Spock's Beard was sort of a phrase that we'd say to each other, my brother and I, when something weird would happen. We'd say, "Wow, that's like Spock's Beard", meaning, "that only happens in a parallel universe, right?" Anyway, Spock only has that beard in the one episode, and it's when he's in the parallel universe in "Mirror, Mirror". So, that was just something we'd say to each other as an inside joke. I put Spock's Beard on the list sort of as a joke. Everybody seemed to like it the best, and so we picked that one.

The band's debut album, The Light, was recorded independently throughout 1994 and released later that year. While Neal Morse had performed the keyboard parts on the album, Ryo Okumoto was hired to fill in for live performances. One of their first major live shows was at the San Francisco Progfest in 1995, where they were introduced to Thomas Waber. Waber, a founding member of Giant Electric Pea and InsideOut Records, signed the band to Giant Electric Pea and licensed The Light for release in Europe.

=== Nick D'Virgilio era (2002–2011) ===
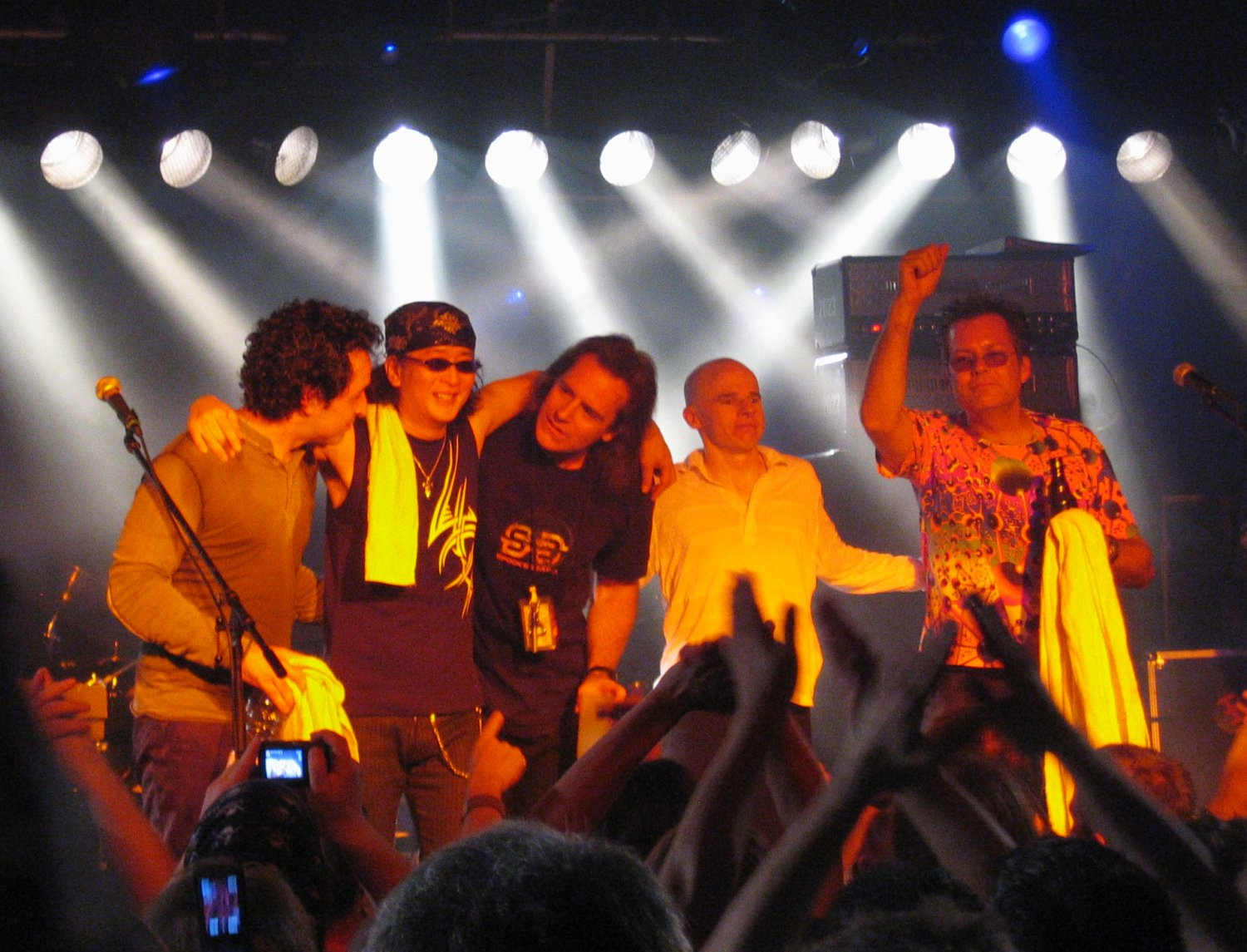
The 2002–2011 lineup of Spock's Beard in 2006

Immediately following the release of Snow, Neal Morse announced that he was leaving Spock's Beard. Having recently converted to Christianity, Morse wanted to explore that aspect of his life more through his music but did not want to impose his beliefs upon the band. Nick D'Virgilio took over as the band's lead singer. D'Virgilio would continue to play drums on studio albums, while Jimmy Keegan was hired to fill in for him as drummer during live performances.

On July 8, 2003, Spock's Beard released their first album without Neal Morse, Feel Euphoria. Without their principal songwriter, the band adopted a more collaborative approach as well as enlisting the help of John Boegehold and Stan Ausmus with songwriting, both of whom would go on to contribute to all of the group's subsequent albums. The result was a musical departure from previous albums, with a conscious shift towards a more modern sound, which was met with a mixed response from fans. On February 1, 2005, Spock's Beard released their eighth album, Octane, which received a generally more positive reception from listeners. Several concerts from the Octane tour were recorded and the highlights released as Gluttons for Punishment, the band's first live album since the departure of Neal Morse.

On May 21, 2006, Dave Meros confirmed that the group had begun working on their ninth studio album. Titled Spock's Beard, it was released on November 21, 2006, to mixed reactions. The band continued to tour sporadically over the next few years, with a 2007 show in the Netherlands released as a live album. On July 23, 2009, Spock's Beard announced they had begun work on their tenth album, to be released independently rather than through a record label. Production costs were covered by pre-orders through the band's website. X was issued as a limited edition for those who had pre-ordered in May 2010. A standard edition was released at the end of August 2010 through Mascot Records, four years after the release of Spock's Beard, the longest gap the band has had between albums. Mascot Records also released a live album, The X Tour Live, recorded at the only US show in support of the X album.

=== Ted Leonard era (2011–present) ===
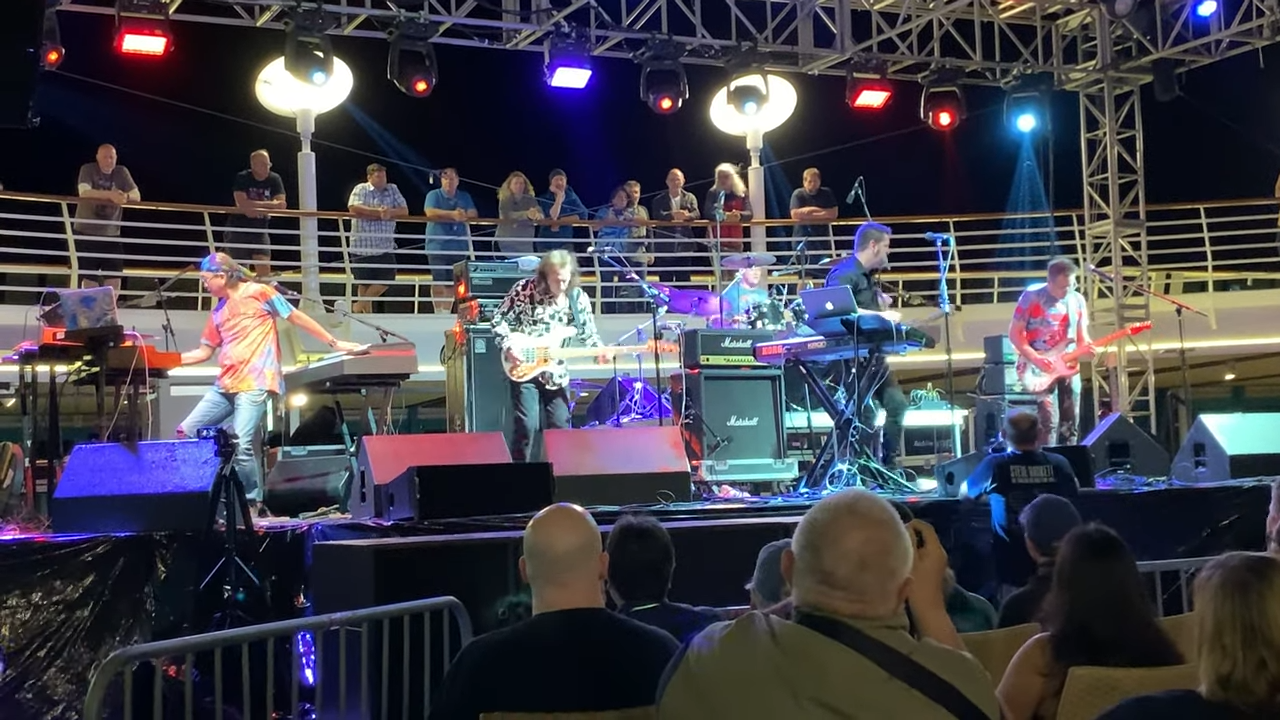
Spock's Beard in 2019

Spock's Beard played the Sweden Rock Festival in June and the High Voltage Festival in July 2011. On both occasions, Enchant vocalist Ted Leonard filled in for Nick D'Virgilio, who was unavailable to perform. The High Voltage performance featured an appearance by Neal Morse, who reunited with the band for the end of "The Light" and "June", which was later released as a live album. On November 18, 2011, D'Virgilio announced his departure from the band, citing personal reasons and other commitments. Two days later, it was announced on the band's official website that Leonard and touring drummer Jimmy Keegan would be joining the band.

On April 2, 2013, Spock's Beard released Brief Nocturnes and Dreamless Sleep, their first studio album in this lineup. The recording and mastering of the album was funded using the crowdsourcing site Indiegogo and featured songwriting contributions from Neal Morse. On April 22, 2015, the band announced that their twelfth album would be titled The Oblivion Particle and released later that year. It came out on August 21, 2015. Later that year, the band issued The First Twenty Years, a compilation album spanning their entire career. It included a new song written by Neal Morse, "Falling for Forever", which featured every past and current member of the band, with the exception of John Ballard.

In July 2016, the band reunited with D'Virgilio and Neal Morse for shows at Morsefest in Cross Plains, Tennessee, and at the Night of the Prog festival in Lorelei, Germany, to perform Snow in its entirety. On October 12, 2016, Keegan announced that he was leaving the band for personal reasons. D'Virgilio filled in on drums and backing vocals for their performance on the shipboard festival Cruise to the Edge 2017. On March 25, 2017, it was confirmed that D'Virgilio had agreed to play on the band's upcoming thirteenth album, with recording expected to begin in May of that year On February 28, 2018, Dave Meros announced that the new album would be titled Noise Floor and would be released on May 25, 2018. On June 13, Spock's Beard announced a tour in support of the album, with former Saga drummer Mike Thorne as a touring drummer.

In 2018, a spinoff of Spock's Beard, Pattern-Seeking Animals, was formed by Ted Leonard, Dave Meros, Jimmy Keegan, and John Boegehold. As of 2025, they have released five studio albums.

On March 20, 2025, Ryo Okumoto announced on his Facebook page that a new Spock's Beard album would be coming out in November, with Nick Potters on drums and backing vocals. Potters had previously played with Okumoto's band on Cruise to the Edge 2024, and he performed his first Spock's Beard show at Alva's Showroom in San Pedro, Los Angeles, in March 2024. He began listening to Spock's Beard in high school and later described joining the band as a "full-circle moment".

In September 2025, the album's title was revealed as being The Archaeoptimist, and the first single, "Invisible", was released. The album duly came out in November 2025, charting at no. 5 on the Official UK Rock & Metal Albums. The Archaeoptimist received positive reviews: Scott Medina of Sonic Perspectives wrote: "A re-energized Ted Leonard–era Spock's Beard is back, complete with new powerhouse drummer Nick Potters, to deliver one of the more streamlined and focused albums of their career."

The band is credited on the second track of guitarist Alan Morse's 2026 solo album, So Many Words, titled "It's Never Enough". The song was originally intended for a Spock's Beard album but was never included.

The band embarked on a world tour starting in late January 2026 to promote The Archaeoptimist.

== Musical style ==
Spock's Beard plays progressive rock with pop leanings, drawing influence from Yes, Genesis, and Gentle Giant. The band is known for their intricate, multi-part vocal harmonies and use of counterpoint vocals.

== Band members ==
Current members

- Alan Morse – guitars, backing and occasional lead vocals (1992–present)
- Dave Meros – bass, backing and occasional lead vocals (1993–present), occasional keyboards (2002–present)
- Ryo Okumoto – keyboards, backing vocals (1995–present)
- Ted Leonard – lead vocals, guitar, keyboards (2011–present)
- Nick Potters – drums, percussion, backing vocals (2025–present, live member: 2024)

Collaborators

- John Boegehold – song co-writer, backing vocals (2003–present)
- Stan Ausmus – song co-writer (2003–present)
- Mike Thorne – drums, percussion, backing vocals (live member: 2018–2024)
- Michael Whiteman – song co-writer, additional acoustic guitar (2025)

Past members

- Nick D'Virgilio – drums, percussion (official member: 1992–2011; live and studio member: 2017–2018; guest: 2014, 2015), backing vocals (1992–2002, 2017–2018), lead vocals (occasionally 1992–2002; full-time 2002–2011), guitar, keyboards (2002–2011)
- Neal Morse – lead vocals, keyboards, guitar, synths (1992–2002; guest: 2008, 2011, 2014)
- John Ballard – bass (1992–93)
- Jimmy Keegan – drums, percussion, backing and occasional lead vocals (2011–2016; live member: 2002–2011)

Timeline

== Discography ==
- The Light (1995)
- Beware of Darkness (1996)
- The Kindness of Strangers (1998)
- Day for Night (1999)
- V (2000)
- Snow (2002)
- Feel Euphoria (2003)
- Octane (2005)
- Spock's Beard (2006)
- X (2010)
- Brief Nocturnes and Dreamless Sleep (2013)
- The Oblivion Particle (2015)
- Noise Floor (2018)
- The Archaeoptimist (2025)
