= Ryo Okumoto =

Japanese rock keyboardist (born 1959)

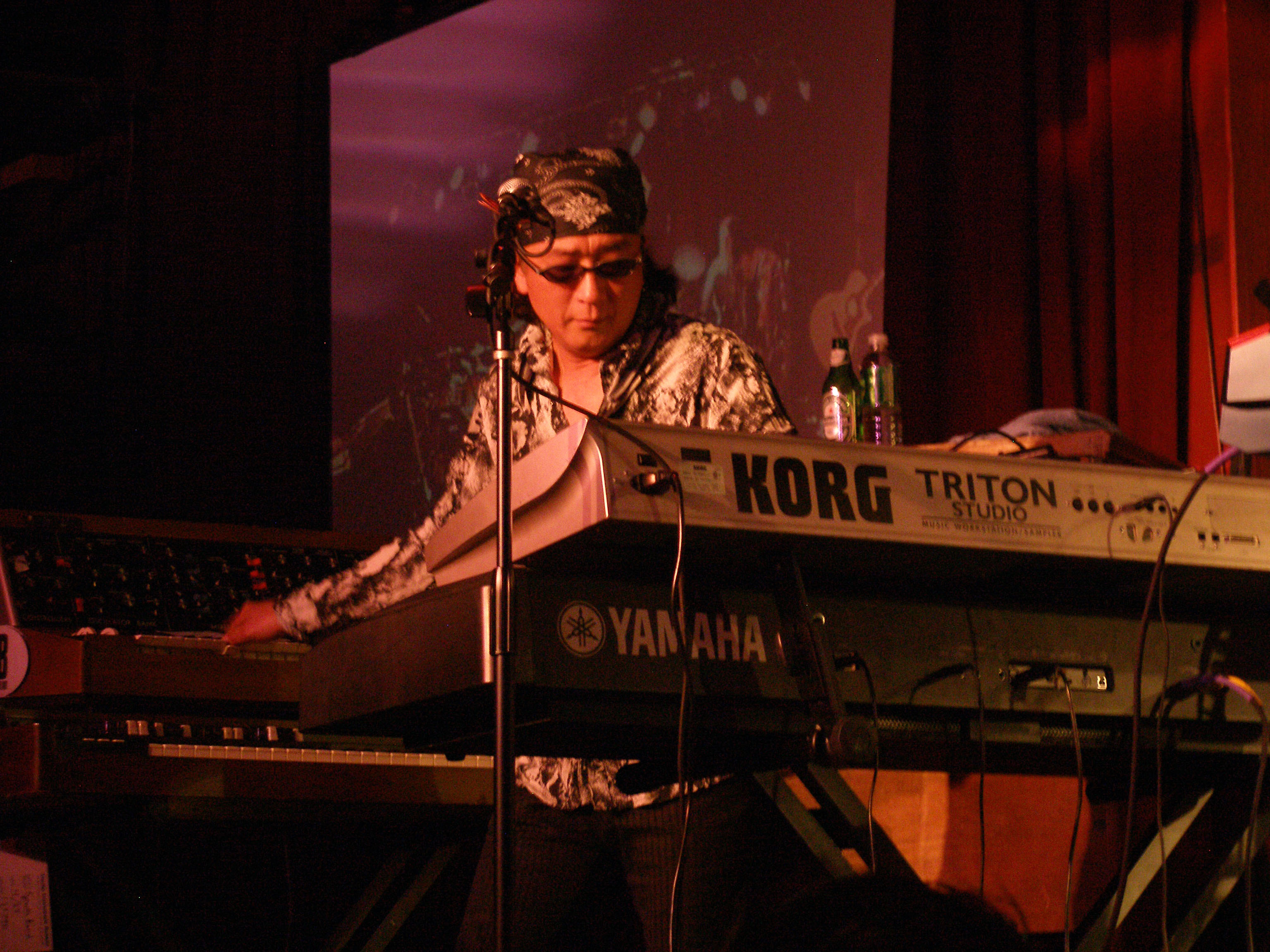
- Okumoto performing with Spock's Beard in 2007

Background information
- Born: May 24, 1959 (age 67); Osaka, Japan
- Genres: Progressive rock; experimental rock
- Occupations: Musician; songwriter
- Instrument: Keyboards
- Years active: 1978–present
- Member of: Spock's Beard; Asia Featuring John Payne; ProgJect
- Formerly of: Phil Collins; Eric Clapton; K²; GPS; Creation
- Website: ryookumoto.com

Ryo Okumoto (奥本亮; born May 24, 1959) is a Japanese rock keyboardist, best known for his work with American progressive rock band Spock's Beard. He joined the band in 1996 and has been a member ever since. When singer and keyboardist Neal Morse was in the band, Ryo played Hammond organ and Mellotron on the albums. Since Morse's departure, Okumoto has been the band's primary keyboardist. He resides in Los Angeles.

Aside from his work with Spock's Beard, Okumoto has performed and recorded with numerous other artists and groups, including GPS, K², Phil Collins, Eric Clapton, and Asia featuring John Payne. For three weeks in 1998, Okumoto was a member of Eric Burdon & the New Animals, before being replaced by Martin Gerschwitz.

Okumoto was a member of Eric André's house band on season 5 of The Eric Andre Show.

In 2019, Ryo joined the progressive rock supergroup cover band ProgJect.

== Discography ==
=== Solo ===
- Makin' Rock (1980)
- Synthesizer (1980)
- Solid Gold (1980)
- Coming Through (2002)
- The Myth of the Mostrophus (2022)

=== with Spock's Beard ===
- Beware of Darkness (1996)
- The Kindness of Strangers (1998)
- Day for Night (1999)
- V (2000)
- Snow (2002)
- Feel Euphoria (2003)
- Octane (2005)
- Spock's Beard (2006)
- X (2010)
- Brief Nocturnes and Dreamless Sleep (2013)
- The Oblivion Particle (2015)
- Noise Floor (2018)
- The Archaeoptimist (2025)

=== with Alan Morse ===
- So Many Words (2026)

=== with K² ===
- Book of the Dead (2005)
- Black Garden (2010)

=== with GPS ===
- Window to the Soul (2006)
