= Jimmy Keegan =

American drummer (born 1969)

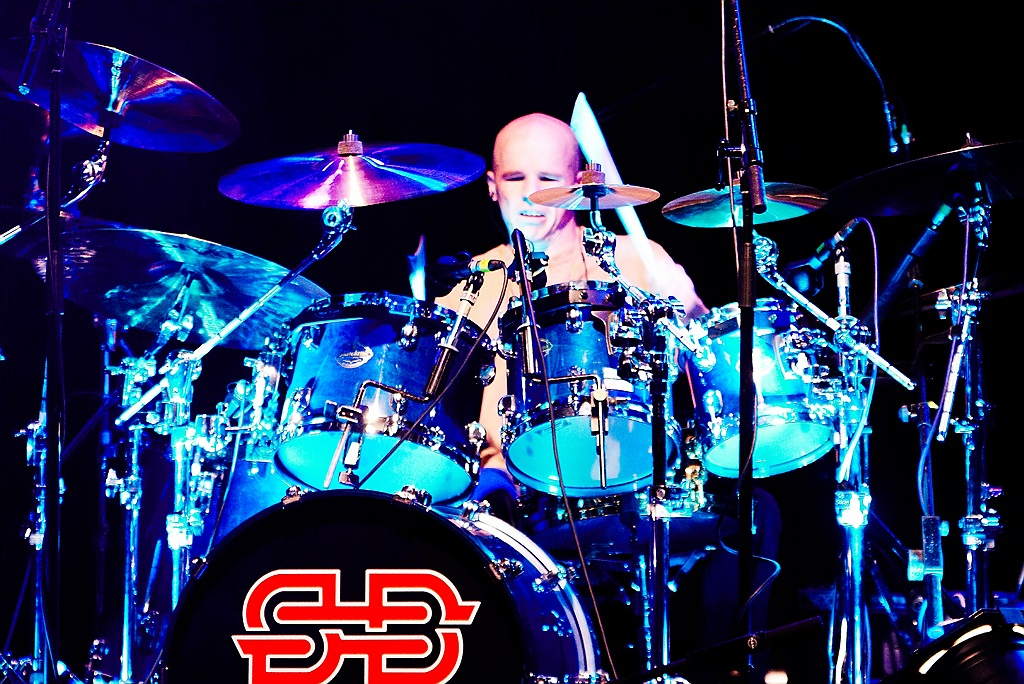
- Keegan with Spock's Beard in 2007

Background information
- Born: James E. Keegan; November 3, 1969 (age 56); Los Angeles, California, U.S.
- Genres: Progressive rock
- Occupations: Musician, actor
- Instrument: Drums
- Years active: 1980–present
- Member of: Pattern-Seeking Animals
- Formerly of: Spock's Beard

James E. Keegan (born November 3, 1969) is an American drummer and voice actor. He has played with artists such as Santana, as the drummer on the song "Primavera" on Santana's hit album Supernatural and with John Waite. At present, Keegan is the drummer of the progressive rock band Pattern-Seeking Animals.

Keegan was the drummer for the progressive rock band Spock's Beard, having replaced original drummer Nick D'Virgilio in November 2011. Before joining Spock's Beard, Keegan was their touring drummer since 2003, when D'Virgilio picked up the frontman and main singer role during live performances. Keegan was a member of Spock's Beard for five years, until he left in October 2016.

Keegan released his first self-titled solo album, Jimmy Keegan, in 2024.

== Acting/Voiceover career ==
According to an interview with Keegan, he did acting and voiceover work as a child. His credits included G.I. Joe, The Littles, and Over The Top.

While Keegan voiced various characters on G.I. Joe, his primary character on The Littles was Henry Bigg. Keegan said "the voice-over work is probably the most fun because I'm a huge cartoon fan." He also had a very brief appearance on the long running CBS daytime drama The Young and the Restless in 1983 as Phillip Chancellor III.

== Equipment ==
Keegan endorses Yamaha Drums. He also uses Aquarian Drumheads, Vater drumsticks, Sabian Cymbals, Focusrite audio, and Audio-Technica microphones.
