= Alan Morse =

American guitarist

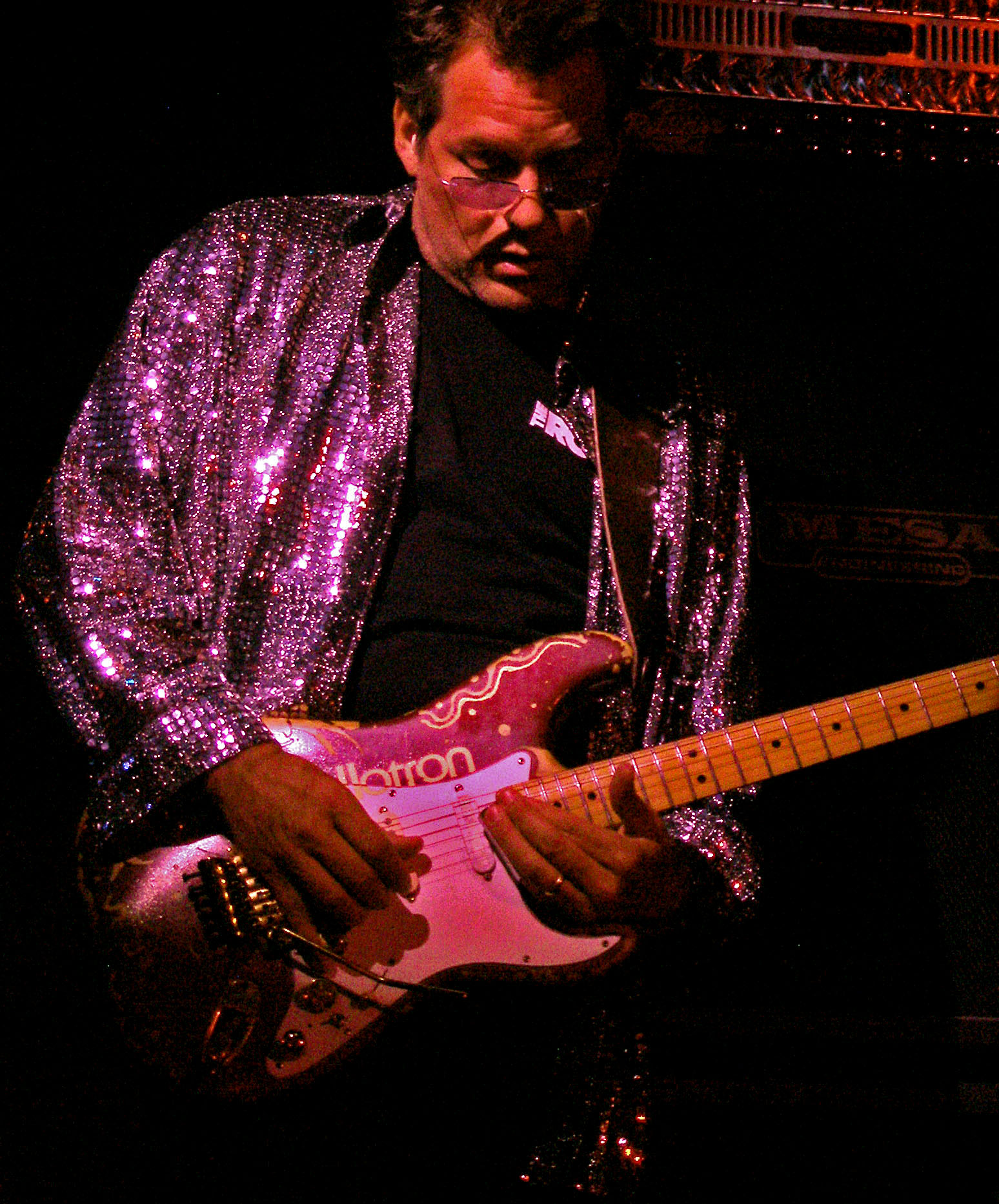
- Alan Morse onstage with Spock's Beard at BB Kings in New York City, on April 27, 2007.

Background information
- Born: August 22, 1958 (age 67)
- Genres: Progressive rock
- Occupation: Musician
- Instruments: Guitar, theremin, cello, musical saw, keyboards, drums, bass, bouzouki
- Years active: 1978–present
- Member of: Spock's Beard

Alan Morse (born August 22, 1958) is an American guitarist. He is the only constant member of the progressive rock band Spock's Beard. He is the brother of co-founder Neal Morse, who left the band in 2002.

== Career ==
Morse has recorded with many artists including Chad & Jeremy, Spencer Davis, Neal Morse, and (Spock's Beard keyboardist) Ryo Okumoto. Along with the guitar, he sings and plays the theremin, the cello, sitar, musical saw, keyboards, drums, bass & bouzouki. Morse has a degree in electrical engineering and owns an electronics manufacturing company, DynaMetric, Inc. Unusually for a rock guitar player, Morse does not use a pick.

Morse's first solo album, Four O'Clock & Hysteria, was released on April 13, 2007. His second solo album, So Many Words, was released on January 22, 2026 and features his brother Neal, Simon Phillips, Tony Levin, and other Spock's Beard members such as Ted Leonard, Ryo Okumoto, Dave Meros, and former member Jimmy Keegan.

== Personal life ==
Morse's father was a music teacher and Morse sang in his father's boys' choir. He began taking piano lessons at an early age, then studied upright bass, and finally learned guitar around the age of 12.

Morse studied some music theory but is largely self-taught as a musician.

Morse is married to Kathryn Morse and has two children. Their son, John, is also a musician; John recorded drums for the track "I Don't Want to Travel Time If It Takes Forever" and guitar and drums for the track "Make Me Real Again" on So Many Words. Julia sings on "Making Up My Heart" on the same album.

== Discography ==
See also Spock's Beard discography.

- Alan Morse – Four O'Clock & Hysteria (2007)
- So Many Words (2026)

=== Guest appearances ===
- Ryo Okumoto – The Myth of the Mostrophus (2022)
- Neal Morse – The Restoration – Joseph: Part Two (guitar solo on "Everlasting") (2024)
