= Cockroach King =

- The thumbnail for the song's music video.

Song by Haken
- Released: 2 September 2013
- Genre: Progressive metal, Progressive rock
- Length: 8:25; 5:58 (Single edit)
- Songwriter: Richard Henshall

"Cockroach King" is a song by English progressive metal band Haken. It is the third song from the band's third album, The Mountain. The song received a single edit shortly after the release of the album but the song was never directly released as a single. The song is to date the band's most popular song and would later go on to form the basis of the band's fifth and sixth albums, Vector and Virus.

The song would later feature on their live releases, L-1VE and Liveforms: An Evening with Haken.

== Background ==
Cockroach King was written entirely by Richard Henshall. The song's lyrics have been a topic of debate since the release of the song and the band has revealed very little directly on the meaning of the song. In recent times the band has been more lenient in revealing the song's true meaning. A theory that the song's lyrics are political in nature would be confirmed by vocalist Ross Jennings in August 2021.

Describing the song's production, the band stated "With 'Cockroach King' we allowed our eccentric side to come to the fore and wrote a song in the tradition of some of our favorite English '70s bands like Queen, The Specials and of course – it's obviously a huge tip of the hat to Gentle Giant. There's some 8-string metal riffing in there too and of course Jens Bogren did an amazing job with the mix, It's a blend of the old traditions and modern sounds that we jokingly refer to as 'Djentle Djiant'."

In a Q&A livestream hosted by the band in April 2020, bassist Connor Green stated that the song is his favourite to play live.

In 2023, Henshall stated that the song was in part inspired by the 1971 novel Fear and Loathing in Las Vegas.

== Music video ==
The music video for Cockroach King features puppet renditions of the band's members, manufactured by band guitarist Charlie Griffiths and controlled by Jennings and Pete Rinaldi paying homage to the music video for "Bohemian Rhapsody". Keyboardist Diego Tejeida stated in an interview "The idea was to make a video clip with comic overtones for audiences of all ages, far from all the serious protocol that a metal/rock video demands." The band also stated that "the Video is also a tribute to a more innocent time before our TVs were dominated by computer animation and hi-definition; a time when things were handmade, wholesome and fun for the whole family!"

The music video for Cockroach King is to date the highest-viewed video on the band's YouTube channel.

== Legacy ==
Five years after the release of the song, it would go on to form the basis for the storyline across Vector and Virus, with the albums acting as an origin story for the character.

Following the success of the song, Cockroaches would become a signature part of the band's iconography and often used as a symbol of the band, such as on the promotional art for their 2018 tour with Leprous.

Ross Jennings would later pay homage to the song in the music video for the song "Feelings" from his 2021 album A Shadow of My Future Self, with the Cockroach King being a boss in the music video's fictitious arcade game.

== Personnel ==
- Ross Jennings – vocals
- Richard Henshall – guitar, keyboards
- Charlie Griffiths – guitar
- Thomas MacLean – bass
- Diego Tejeida – keyboards, sound design
- Raymond Hearne – drums
- Christian Burnett – editor, director (music video)
