= In a Fever Dream =

in a fever dream

EP by Haken
- Released: July 17, 2026
- Studio: Vada Studios
- Genre: Progressive metal
- Length: 26:22
- Label: Inside Out Music
- Producer: George Lever

Haken chronology
Liveforms: An Evening with Haken (2025)	in a fever dream (2026)

Singles from in a fever dream
- 1. "in a fever dream" Released: 21 May 2026; 2. "bleeding sky" Released: 11 June 2026; 3. "delirium" Released: 1 July 2026

In a Fever Dream (stylised in lower-case) is the second studio EP by British progressive metal band Haken, released on 17 July 2026 through Inside Out Music.

It is the first release since 2008's Enter the 5th Dimension to not feature Charlie Griffiths, and the first since The Mountain to not feature Conner Green, who both left the band in January 2026. It is the first release to feature an outside producer, bringing in George Lever, primarily known for his work with Sleep Token.

The EP's first single, "In a Fever Dream", was released without prior notice on 21 May 2026 and features a guest appearance by The Aristocrats bassist Bryan Beller. A second single, "bleeding sky" was released on 11 June 2026, featuring Adam "Nolly" Getgood on bass, who had previously worked with them for mixing on Vector and Virus. Along with the single, the band also announced a European headline tour for the autumn of 2026. A third single, "delirium", was released on 17 July 2026, as well as officially announcing the EP's release date.

The EP was announced with the tagline "reflection / rediscovery, challenge / renewal".

== Background and production ==
According to an interview with Richard Henshall, the EP was designed to serve as a snapshot of where the band and its members were in their lives, following the departure of Griffiths and Green. It also came from a desire to make a full record built around the more streamlined songs in their catalogue, citing the songs "Deathless" from Visions, "Somebody" from The Mountain, and "Canary Yellow" from Virus as examples. The EP was written and recorded with a more improvised manner, with much of the writing being done in the form of jam sessions.

While writing the album, there was a desire to create a more homogenous sound amongst each member's contributions.

According to Henshall, "in a fever dream" and "lotus" were originally written as one song, but were split, citing a desire to give the EP a more cyclical feeling. Henshall cites rock band Radiohead as the primary inspiration for "eclipsed by you".

About the EP, the band commented:

This EP was born from a period of reflection and rediscovery. Over the last few years, we've faced challenges that forced us to look inward, both as musicians and as people, and the songs on this record are the result of that journey. We allowed ourselves to be completely honest in the writing process, digging into real experiences, doubts, and emotions rather than hiding behind them. That vulnerability gave these songs a weight and purpose unlike anything we've created before. Musically, we pushed ourselves into new territory, embracing fresh influences while holding onto the intensity and identity that define this band. Working with producer George Lever helped us sharpen that vision, and Vada Studios provided the perfect environment to collaborate and bring it to life. This EP captures a moment in time of us finding our feet again – moving forward, taking risks, and creating from a place that feels as genuine as we have ever been.

The album's artwork is "The Last Moonlight", an acrylic painting by Georgian painter Vaxo Lang, known for his extreme horror artworks.

== Reception ==
The EP has received lukewarm to positive reviews from critics. The Progressive Subway gave the EP a 5 out of 10, lamenting the change in sound, stating: "Frighteningly, the next album in the new era may see your favorite "second coming of Dream Theater" band turn into Sleep Token, with Haken continuing to chase a sound that's currently popular." Dom Lawson from Blabbermouth was more positive, regarding the EP as "both a brave step away from the expected and a strident consolidation of everything that the band have achieved to date. Ingenious and classy, as ever." The PROG Mind gave the EP a 10 out of 10, praising it for its darker tone and more direct sound. Steve Joyce from The Prog Report was mildly positive, stating: "Does the music on this EP rival the heights of albums such as Visions, The Mountain and Fauna? Arguably not. Is the EP an entertaining release in its own right with plenty for all genre fans to enjoy? Certainly. Does Haken’s future look bright? Absolutely!"

== Track listing ==
All tracks are written by Richard Henshall, Ross Jennings, Raymond Hearne, and Peter Jones.

No.	Title	Length
1.	"In a Fever Dream"	7:12
2.	"Delirium"	4:04
3.	"Eclipsed by You"	3:24
4.	"Bleeding Sky"	4:18
5.	"Lotus"	7:22
Total length:		26:22

== Personnel ==
Haken

- Ross Jennings – lead vocals
- Richard Henshall – guitars
- Peter Jones – keyboards, synthesizers
- Raymond Hearne – drums

Additional musicians

- Bryan Beller - bass (tracks 1, 5)
- Adam "Nolly" Getgood - bass (tracks 2, 4)

Production and design

- George Lever - producer
- Vaxo Lang - artwork
