= L-1VE =

2018 video album by Haken

Video by Haken
- Released: 22 June 2018
- Recorded: 10 September 2016 and 13 April 2017
- Venue: Melkweg, Amsterdam, and Center Stage, Atlanta
- Genre: Progressive metal, progressive rock
- Length: 1:54:26 (DVD1); 1:01:40 (DVD2); Total length: 2:56:06
- Label: Inside Out Music

Haken chronology
Affinity (2016)	L-1VE (2018)	Vector (2018)

Singles from L-1VE
- 1. "In Memoriam" Released: 11 May 2018; 2. "The Endless Knot" Released: 8 June 2018

L-1VE is the first video album by English progressive metal band Haken. It was released on 22 June 2018. Most of the concert was filmed on 13 April 2017, at the Melkweg in Amsterdam during their 10th anniversary tour in 2017. It also includes four bonus tracks filmed at ProgPower USA 2016 at the Center Stage in Atlanta, which also includes Mike Portnoy's cameo appearance on gong, as well as all of the official videos from the Affinity album.

While it includes live performances of songs from all their albums, most of them are from The Mountain and Affinity.

The main show and the bonus material on the DVD are also mixed in Dolby Digital 5.1 surround sound.

== Background ==
About the release of the live album, the band commented on their official website:

The release of official live material is a project that is long overdue and we know our existing fans have been crying out for this for some time now. Whilst we have filmed and recorded many shows in the past we have always felt there were elements of our shows that could be improved 'visually' before we documented and immortalised this for the world to see and that the timing for a live release never felt right for us. This is just our nature as creative people to be so extremely self-critical and constantly strive for perfection. It is largely due to the will of the people that the idea of this project became a reality. Both the band and the label were inundated with emails requesting a live release in some shape or form, and it was actually rather flattering, so giving the people what they wanted just felt like the right thing to do.

On 11 May 2018, Inside Out Music's official YouTube channel released a live performance of the song "In Memoriam", and Charlie Griffiths also commented:

"In Memoriam" is one of those tracks that always works really well live for us. I think because there's a lot of cool riffs and grooves which get people moving. Also it's the coolest thing in the world to hear people singing along with the chorus; we really love that interaction and of course our fans all have wonderful singing voices!

On 7 June 2018, the same channel released a live performance of the song "The Endless Knot". The band said:

"The Endless Knot" is one of our live favourites; the crowd reaction when the opening riff kicks off always sends goose bumps, knowing we're all in for a wild ride of brutal riffing, mosh-friendly dub-step and epic sing-a-longs! It's just a chance for everyone to let their hair down while simultaneously showcasing one of our shorter, yet more complicated tunes to play.

The artwork was once again produced by long-time collaborators Blacklake. The live audio was mixed by Jerry Guidroz, known for his work with Neal Morse and The Winery Dogs. Post production/editing work on both the Amsterdam and Atlanta concert films was carried out by Crystal Spotlight, known for their work with Steven Wilson and Dream Theater.

== Critical reception ==
Professional ratings
Review scores
Source	Rating
AllMusic	3.5/5 stars

Reviewing the release for AllMusic, Thom Jurek claimed that "With few notable exceptions, it's rare that a live album would provide suitable enough introductions for new listeners and unsuspecting fans. That said, England's Haken prove the exception to the rule on L1ve."

== Track listing ==
The track listing consists of two CDs, two DVDs and three official videos.

DVD 1 – Live in Amsterdam 2017

1. "affinity.exe/Initiate" (from Affinity)
2. "In Memoriam" (from The Mountain)
3. "1985" (from Affinity)
4. "Red Giant" (from Affinity)
5. "Aquamedley" (a medley of Aquarius)
6. "As Death Embraces" (from The Mountain)
7. "Atlas Stone" (from The Mountain)
8. "Cockroach King" (from The Mountain)
9. "The Architect" (from Affinity)
10. "The Endless Knot" (from Affinity)
11. "Visions" (from Visions)

DVD 2 – Live at Prog Power 2016

1. "Falling Back to Earth" (from The Mountain)
2. "Earthrise" (from Affinity)
3. "Pareidolia" (from The Mountain)
4. "Crystallised" (from Restoration)
5. "Initiate" (Official Video)
6. "Earthrise" (Official Video)
7. "Lapse" (Official Video)

CD 1 – Live in Amsterdam 2017 All songs and arrangements written by Haken, except where noted.

No.	Title	Lyrics	Music	Length
1.	"affinity.exe/Initiate"			6:00
2.	"In Memoriam"	Charlie Griffiths, Ross Jennings	Richard Henshall	4:42
3.	"1985"			9:21
4.	"Red Giant"			6:31
5.	"Aquamedley"	Jennings	Henshall	22:26
Total length:				49:00

CD 2 – Live in Amsterdam 2017

All songs and arrangements written by Haken, except where noted.

No.	Title	Lyrics	Music	Length
1.	"As Death Embraces"	Diego Tejeida	Tejeida	3:50
2.	"Atlas Stone"	Raymond Hearne, Jennings, Griffiths	Henshall	7:12
3.	"Cockroach King"	Henshall	Henshall	8:17
4.	"The Architect"			15:59
5.	"The Endless Knot"			6:34
6.	"Visions"	Jennings	Henshall	23:34
Total length:				1:05:26

== L+1VE ==
L+1VE

Live album (EP) by Haken
- Released: 7 December 2018
- Recorded: 10 September 2016
- Venue: Center Stage, Atlanta, GA
- Genre: Progressive metal
- Length: 47:52
- Label: Inside Out Music
- Producer: Haken

Haken chronology
Vector (2018)	L+1VE (2018)	Virus (2020)

Live at Prog Power 2016

- All songs and arrangements written by Haken, except where noted.

No.	Title	Lyrics	Music	Length
1.	"Falling Back to Earth"	Jennings; Griffiths	Henshall	12:10
2.	"Pareidolia"	Tejeida	Henshall	10:20
3.	"Earthrise"			5:08
4.	"Crystallised"	Hearne; Charlie Griffiths; Richard Henshall		20:14
Total length:				47:52

== Personnel ==
- Ross Jennings – lead vocals
- Richard Henshall – guitars, keyboards, backing vocals
- Charlie Griffiths – guitars, backing vocals
- Raymond Hearne – drums, backing vocals, tuba
- Diego Tejeida – keyboards, backing vocals, additional lead vocals on "Pareidolia"
- Conner Green – bass, backing vocals
- Mike Portnoy – gong (on "Crystallised")

== Charts ==
Chart (2018)	Peak position
Scottish Albums (OCC)	77
Swiss Albums (Schweizer Hitparade)	72
