= A Shadow of My Future Self =

2021 album by Ross Jennings

Studio album by Ross Jennings
- Released: 19 November 2021
- Length: 78:29
- Label: Graphite Records
- Producer: Ross Jennings

Ross Jennings chronology
| A Shadow of My Future Self (2021) | Acoustic Shadows (2022) |

Singles from A Shadow of My Future Self
- 1. "Words We Can't Unsay" Released: 25 June 2021; 2. "Grounded" Released: 21 July 2021; 3. "Violet" Released: 13 August 2021; 4. "Feelings" Released: 17 September 2021; 5. "Catcher in the Rye" Released: 29 October 2021

A Shadow of My Future Self is the debut studio album by British singer-songwriter Ross Jennings. It was released on 19 November 2021 through Graphite Records. Unlike his more well-known Progressive music, Jennings' solo record follows a much more mainstream approach with Jennings directly citing Styx, Coldplay, Journey and Porcupine Tree as references.

On 31 December 2021, Jennings announced on Instagram page that a follow-up album was in the works.

== Background ==
The album's name is a play on the phrase "a shadow of my former self," but spins the phrase in a positive light, with the idea that the person you are now has room to improve and grow as a person.

The album was initially teased on 3 October 2020 through Jennings' social media and was later announced by name on 25 June 2021 along with the release of the album's first single "Words We Can't Unsay." Subsequent singles "Grounded," "Violet," "Feelings," and "Catcher in the Rye" were released monthly with music videos until the albums release. "Rocket Science" later received a music video upon the album's release and "Be The One" received a music video upon the release of the vinyl edition of the album.

The album later received a Japanese release with an orchestral version of the song "Third Degree" included as a bonus track.

== Production ==
The album began production near the beginning of the COVID-19 pandemic, with the pandemic giving Ross the chance to put together his own album while unable to perform and write music with Haken.

The album's material dates to as far back as at least 2010. The first song on the album to be written for the album was "Third Degree." Originally titled "The Person You Are," it was initially written around the same time as "She Loves You More". The first song written directly for the album was "Feelings," with the song being used as a benchmark for the album's recording techniques. The lyrics for "Words We Can't Unsay" were heavily based upon his marriage issues at the time. This association bleeds directly into some of the lyrics as Ross stated that many lines were taken directly from his marital arguments.

The lyrics and vocal melody for chorus for the song "Young at Heart" were initially planned to be used on the song "Prosthetic" from Haken's 2020 album Virus but ultimately went unused by the band.

The music video for "Feelings" was based upon iconic video games and features Ross Jennings as the protagonist of an arcade game with various levels loosely based upon Super Mario Odyssey, The Legend of Zelda: Breath of the Wild, Metal Gear Solid and Guitar Hero. An actual game was created by Crystal Spotlight in Unreal Engine 4 and Ross announced that a full game may be released if interest is shown.

The final song on the album, Jennings' cover of Be the One by Dua Lipa, was done as a bit of fun on Jennings' part, stating "You wouldn't expect a prog metal artist to perform a "half-decent cover of a Dua Lipa song."

The album's cover was taken from a series of promotional shots taken by Jennings' wife. The photo in particular stood out to Jennings and according to him, it greatly represented his feelings with himself and the album at the time. He then gave the photo to long-time Haken collaborators Blacklake who turned the photo into a Banksy-esque graffiti piece. The cover's colour choice is a reference to the song "Violet." Jennings has also teased the idea of the colour scheme being related to "non-stop purple force," a misheard line in the song "Falling Back to Earth" from Haken's 2013 album The Mountain.

== Track listing ==
All lyrics are written by Ross Jennings.

| No. | Title | Length |
|---|---|---|
| 1. | "Better Times" | 4:08 |
| 2. | "Words We Can't Unsay" | 5:04 |
| 3. | "Violet" | 5:29 |
| 4. | "The Apologist" | 4:55 |
| 5. | "Rocket Science" | 4:15 |
| 6. | "Catcher in the Rye" | 5:18 |
| 7. | "Since That Day" | 3:25 |
| 8. | "Young at Heart" | 8:13 |
| 9. | "Feelings" | 4:56 |
| 10. | "Third Degree" | 4:34 |
| 11. | "Phoenix" | 11:50 |
| 12. | "Grounded" | 8:02 |
| 13. | "Year" | 4:55 |
| 14. | "Be the One (Bonus Track)" | 3:25 |
| Total length: | | 78:29 |

== Acoustic Shadows ==
Acoustic Shadows

Live album by Ross Jennings
- Released: January 28, 2022
- Genre: Progressive rock, Pop rock
- Length: 52:37
- Label: Graphite Records
- Producer: Ross Jennings

Ross Jennings chronology
| A Shadow of My Future Self (2021) | Acoustic Shadows (2022) | Troika (2022) |

An acoustic rendition of the album titled Acoustic Shadows was performed as part of a paid livestream by Jennings on 23 July 2021, with videos of the performances of "Words We Can't Unsay" and "Feelings" being released later on. An Acoustic Shadows tour

was scheduled to coincide with the albums launch but were cancelled due to financial woes and the COVID-19 pandemic. The setlist for the livestream included the song "She Loves You More," a track Jennings had written that was featured on Redados' 2010 album Too Tired for Sleep, "Canary Yellow" from Haken's 2020 album Virus, and "Sail Away" from Novena's 2020 album Eleventh Hour.

As well as this, the tour was planned to include songs from outside the album. These songs were "The Mind's Eye" and "Deathless," from Haken's 2010 album Visions, "Sun Dance" and "Disconnected," from Novena's 2020 album Eleventh Hour, as well as Bruce Springsteen's "Dancing in the Dark" and Peter Gabriel's "Solsbury Hill".

In January 2021, Jennings released a recording of the Acoustic Shadows livestream onto streaming services.

=== Track listing ===
All lyrics are written by Ross Jennings, except on "Sail Away" and "Canary Yellow.".

| No. | Title | Length |
|---|---|---|
| 1. | "Better Times" | 4:21 |
| 2. | "Words We Can't Unsay" | 5:08 |
| 3. | "Rocket Science" | 4:17 |
| 4. | "Young at Heart" | 7:28 |
| 5. | "Since That Day" | 3:29 |
| 6. | "She Loves You More" | 4:35 |
| 7. | "Third Degree" | 4:44 |
| 8. | "Grounded" | 5:52 |
| 9. | "Feelings" | 4:15 |
| 10. | "Sail Away" (ft. Harrison White) | 4:28 |
| 11. | "Canary Yellow" (ft. Richard Henshall) | 3:54 |
| Total length: | | 52:37 |

=== Personnel ===
- Ross Jennings – vocals, guitar
- Richard Henshall – guitar on "Canary Yellow"
- Harrison White – piano on "Sail Away"

== Reception ==
Professional ratings
Review scores
| Source | Rating |
|---|---|
| Prog Radio | 4.5/5 stars |
| Sonic Perspectives | 9/10 |
| The PROG Mind | 8.5/10 |
| The Fire Note | 4.5/5 |
| Norway Rock Magazine | 4.5/6 |

Reception for the album has been generally positive. SonicPerspectives highly praised the album, stating "Jennings' debut confidently establishes him as an artist in his own right with the potential to chart whichever course he wishes in the future. A Shadow of My Future Self" is one of 2021's true gems." The PROG Mind also strongly praised the album, in particuclar its diversity, stating "The music can sound like New Wave one moment, Pink Floyd another, and then something all Ross' own in still another. The range is impressive, and one reason why this record really works." Progarchy provides unilateral praise, stating "Jennings is at the top of his game on vocals and guitar, backed by stellar players."

The album was later nominated for The Prog Report's album of the year, as well as being nominated for four other categories including "Album Production of the Year," "Epic of the Year" ("Phoenix"), "Music VIdeo of the Year" ("Feelings") and "Song of the Year" ("Violet").

== Personnel ==
Musicians

- Ross Jennings – vocals, guitar
- Nathan Navarro – bass, additional vocals on "Phoenix"
- Simen Sandnes – drums, additional vocals on "Phoenix"
- Vikram Shankar – piano, keyboards, additional vocals on "Phoenix", orchestral arrangement
- Kristian Frostad – lap steel guitar
- Jørgen Lund Karlsen – saxophone, brass arrangements on "Word We Can't Unsay"
- Sigurd Evensen – trombone
- Stig Espen Hundsnes – trumpet
- Yulia Jennings – additional vocals on "Phoenix"
- Dylan Laine – additional vocals on "Phoenix"
- Amanda Wilson – additional vocals on "Phoenix"
- Paul Winstanley – additional vocals on "Phoenix"
- Karim Sinno – additional vocals on "Phoenix"
- Clea Daher – additional vocals on "Phoenix"
- Fredrik Bergersen Klemp – additional vocals on "Phoenix"

Technical

- Ross Jennings – production
- Karim Sinno – mixing, additional editing and engineering
- Ermin Hamidovic – mastering
- Paul 'Win' Wintanley – vocals and additional guitar recording and engineering
