= Troika (D'Virgilio, Morse & Jennings album) =

Studio album by D'Virgilio, Morse & Jennings
- Released: February 25, 2022
- Genre: Progressive rock; folk rock; pop rock; acoustic rock
- Length: 59:58
- Label: InsideOut

Nick D'Virgilio chronology
Invisible (2020)	Troika (2022)

Neal Morse chronology
Innocence & Danger (w/ The Neal Morse Band) (2021)	Troika (2022)

Ross Jennings chronology
A Shadow of My Future Self (2021)	Troika (2022)

Troika is a collaborative album by progressive rock/metal musicians Nick D'Virgilio (Big Big Train, ex-Spock's Beard), Neal Morse (The Neal Morse Band, Transatlantic, Flying Colors, ex-Spock's Beard) and Ross Jennings (Haken, Novena) under the moniker D'Virgilio, Morse & Jennings. It was released through InsideOut Music on February 25, 2022.

== Background ==
The album was envisioned by Neal Morse, who wanted to create acoustic songs with vocal harmonies. He first thought of his former Spock's Beard mate Nick D'Virgilio, and then they considered Ross Jennings for the third voice. Jennings commented that people shouldn't expect a "Spock's Beard meets Haken" album, and the trio has compared itself to Crosby, Stills and Nash.

The album was officially announced in September 2021. In November 29 they teased the first single "Julia"; the song was later released on December 21, 2021, alongside the announcement of the album's release date. "Julia" was written by Jennings as a 8-minute epic, which was later shortened by Morse.

The second single, "Everything I Am", came on January 11, 2022. It was written by Morse "one morning when my wife was having a bad day and it's about how no matter what happens our lives are fully intertwined no matter what." The third single, "You Set My Soul on Fire", was written by D'Virgilio and came out on February 8.

== Critical reception ==
Professional ratings
Review scores
Source	Rating
Sonic Perspectives	8.8

Scott Medina, on Sonic Perspectives, commented that "to some degree, the project has already realized its potential within the course of one minute. The rest is just icing." He criticized the song order, believing that the first half was "much more acoustic-based and the rockers coming towards the latter half, making for a confusing listening experience. Mixing it up more could have made for a better-rounded presentation of the range of the material." He ultimately said that the trio "let their voices run wild in joy as if they had been let out on recess from their day jobs."

== Track listing ==
Troika track listing
No.	Title	Writer(s)	Length
1.	"Everything I Am"	Neal Morse	5:43
2.	"Julia"	Ross Jennings, Morse	6:07
3.	"You Set My Soul on Fire"	Nick D'Virgilio	3:22
4.	"One Time Less"	Morse	4:53
5.	"Another Trip Around the Sun"	Jennings	4:39
6.	"A Change Is Gonna Come"	Morse	4:24
7.	"If I Could"	D'Virgilio	4:02
8.	"King for a Day"	Jennings	5:47
9.	"Second Hand Sons"	Morse	4:43
10.	"My Guardian"	D'Virgilio	3:43
11.	"What You Leave Behind"	Morse	4:16

Bonus
No.	Title	Writer(s)	Length
12.	"Julia" (alternative version)	Jennings	8:19
Total length:			59:58

== Personnel ==
- Nick D'Virgilio – vocals; drums; percussion; bass, acoustic and electric guitars; mellotron
- Neal Morse – vocals; acoustic, bass, fretless bass, slide and electric guitars; organ, melodica, electric piano, mandolin
- Ross Jennings – vocals; lead electric and 6 & 12-string acoustic guitar, synthesizer
- Tony Levin – bass on "If I Could"

== Charts ==
Chart performance for Troika
Chart (2022)	Peak position
German Albums (Offizielle Top 100)	38
Swiss Albums (Schweizer Hitparade)	83
