= Affinity (Haken album) =

Studio album by Haken
- Released: 29 April 2016
- Recorded: 2015–2016
- Studio: The Crypt (London); Wandsworth Studios (London)
- Genre: Progressive metal, progressive rock, alternative metal
- Length: 61:25
- Label: Inside Out Music
- Producer: Haken

Haken chronology
Restoration (2014)	Affinity (2016)	L-1VE (2018)

Singles from Affinity
- 1. "Initiate" Released: 18 March 2016; 2. "The Endless Knot" Released: 15 April 2016

Affinity is the fourth studio album by English progressive metal band Haken. It was released on 29 April 2016 by Inside Out Music. It is the group's first full-length album with the bass guitarist Conner Green following the departure of Thomas MacLean.

The first single, "Initiate", was released on 18 March 2016, along with a music video. The second single, "The Endless Knot", was released for digital download on 15 April 2016, a few days after the release of the lyric video.

To promote the album, the band had its official website completely redesigned to simulate a 1980s operating system.

== Concept ==
Affinity covers subjects such as the evolution of computing and humanity, the relationship between man and machine, human behavior and modern society, and it also asks if "artificial intelligence will ever surpass the human capacity to create/recreate life". When asked if it was a concept album, the vocalist Ross Jennings said that it "is more like a soundtrack to a series of recurring themes than an actual concept album." He also said that none of the band members "feel like we've made our best work yet, let alone 'made it'. So that urge to produce something better than last time will always be there."

The cover art was created by Blacklake Design (The Mountain and Restoration) and features the same six birds seen in The Mountain cover art, each representing a member of the band. It was inspired by packaging, business, commercial brand logos and computing from the 1980s.

== Songwriting ==
Affinity was the first time that all six members of the band contributed with compositions from scratch instead of building music around the guitarist and keyboard player Richard Henshall's ideas. It is inspired by 1980s music, specifically prog music. Jennings said Affinity is an attempt to show people how the elements from that decade were necessary for the band's evolution, despite many saying prog died back then. Keyboard player Diego Tejeida said he was inspired by the decade's heavy usage of synthesisers, particularly by Vince DiCola's works.

The idea of making an entire album dedicated to that time came after the band spent much time listening to Toto, DiCola and Van Halen, and specially after the guitarist Charlie Griffiths sent them an initial version of "1985".

The longest track, "The Architect", at over 15 minutes, took Tejeida two weeks to finish his part. It has guest harsh vocals by Einar Solberg from the Norwegian progressive metal band Leprous. Jennings initially intended to do those vocals himself, but the band decided to take the opportunity to invite a guest singer for that part. He also said of the song writing process:

Charlie sent the initial sketch/framework for this one. 'The Architect' was one of those cases where one section of a song got a completely different meaning when someone else got involved. For instance, Charlie had some really cool stereo guitar lines for the middle section, I came and added big ambient/electronica/sound design textures to it, then Conner [Green] came with an incredible bass solo. Ray added a mental trip hop beat... so on and so forth.

== Critical reception ==
Professional ratings
Review scores
Source	Rating
AllMusic	4/5 stars
Angry Metal Guy	4.5/5 stars
Heavy Blog is Heavy	4.5/5 stars
Metal.de	9/10 stars
Metal Injection	8.5/10 stars
Metal Underground	4/5 stars
Progressive Music Planet	10/10 stars
Sputnikmusic	3.5/5 stars
Ultimate Guitar Archive	8.4/10
When Prog and Power Unite	A

Affinity was met with critical acclaim. Metal Underground's Ty A. praised the band for achieving a smooth "combo of the metal and prog elements", but criticised the album's second half for not being as strong as the first. Michael Klaas, from Metal.de, called it one of the most captivating prog metal albums in years.

In a review for AllMusic, Thom Jurek compared it to the band's previous work by clarifying that it's "less dense than The Mountain musically, but no less sophisticated. The textural scope is wider and considerably brighter. The striking harmonic sensibilities in these songs are marked statements of how prog is capable of attracting those listeners who aren't predisposed to it, but more than that, it's great fun to play."

Writing for Sputnikmusic, Thompson D. Gerhart praised the album but was not as impressed as he was with The Mountain, stating that "while the group execute with precision on the dystopian, hacker-y concept dreamed up for Affinity, the broader space for dreaming on The Mountain seems to have allowed for more big and sprawling ideas to come forth and flourish, while it's the quick hits that deliver the statement of Affinity most articulately".

The Ultimate Guitar Archive team praised Haken's songwriting and the unity among members, but called Jennings's vocal work "restricted" for relying too much on his head voice. Progressive Music Planet's Rob gave it a perfect 10/10 score and called it "a clear contender for album of the year". He also said the album "gets better with each listen" and that it is "Haken's best batch of songs and the best mixture of their influences too". When Prog and Power Unite's Nick said the album may not replace The Mountain as his favorite Haken album, but it "comes very close". He praised Diego Tejeida's keyboard work and his ability to take "the demands of the 80's style".

== Track listing ==
All tracks are written by Richard Henshall, Ross Jennings, Conner Green, Raymond Hearne, Charlie Griffiths and Diego Tejeida.

No.	Title	Length
1.	"affinity.exe" (instrumental)	1:24
2.	"Initiate"	4:16
3.	"1985"	9:08
4.	"Lapse"	4:44
5.	"The Architect" (featuring Einar Solberg of Leprous)	15:40
6.	"Earthrise"	4:48
7.	"Red Giant"	6:06
8.	"The Endless Knot"	5:50
9.	"Bound by Gravity" (featuring Pete Rinaldi of Headspace)	9:29
Total length:		61:25

Drive B: INSTRU. – Limited digipak edition bonus instrumental CD
No.	Title	Length
1.	"affinity.exe" (instrumental)	1:24
2.	"Initiate" (instrumental)	4:16
3.	"1985" (instrumental)	9:09
4.	"Lapse" (instrumental)	4:44
5.	"The Architect" (instrumental)	15:40
6.	"Earthrise" (instrumental)	4:48
7.	"Red Giant" (instrumental)	6:06
8.	"The Endless Knot" (instrumental)	5:50
9.	"Bound by Gravity" (instrumental; featuring Pete Rinaldi)	9:29
Total length:		61:26

== Personnel ==
Haken

- Ross Jennings – vocals
- Richard "Hen" Henshall – guitars
- Charlie Griffiths – guitars
- Conner Green – bass
- Diego Tejeida – keyboards
- Raymond Hearne – drums

Additional musicians

- Einar Solberg – harsh vocals (track 5)
- Pete Rinaldi – acoustic guitar (track 9)

Production and design

- Jens Bogren – mixing, mastering
- Blacklake – artwork, design
- Diego Tejeida – sound design

== Charts ==
Chart (2016)	Peak position
Austrian Albums (Ö3 Austria)	69
Belgian Albums (Ultratop Flanders)	92
Dutch Albums (Album Top 100)	43
Finnish Albums (Suomen virallinen lista)	23
German Albums (Offizielle Top 100)	24
Italian Albums (FIMI)	79
Swiss Albums (Schweizer Hitparade)	36
UK Albums (OCC)	96
