= Liveforms: An Evening with Haken =

2025 live album by Haken

Video by Haken
- Released: 9 May 2025
- Recorded: 21 September 2024
- Venue: O2 Forum Kentish Town (London)
- Genre: Progressive metal, progressive rock
- Length: 166:50
- Label: Inside Out Music

Haken chronology
Fauna (2023)	Liveforms: An Evening with Haken (2025)	In a Fever Dream (2026)

Singles from Liveforms: An Evening with Haken
- 1. "Beneath the White Rainbow" Released: 28 February 2025; 2. "Puzzle Box" Released: 16 April 2025

Liveforms: An Evening with Haken is the second video album by English progressive metal band Haken. It was released on 9 May 2025. Most of the concert was filmed on 21 September 2024, at the O2 Forum Kentish Town in London.

While it includes live performances of songs from all their albums, most are from the album Fauna, as the first set consisted of a playthrough of it in its entirety.

It is their last album featuring guitarist Charlie Griffiths and bassist Conner Green, who both left the band in early 2026.

== Track listing ==
The track listing consists of three CDs and one Blu-ray. Only the Blu-ray and the digital download versions feature the concert in its actual order (due to the technical limitations of the CD format).

CD 1

All songs and arrangements written by Haken (Conner Green, Charlie Griffiths, Raymond Hearne, Richard Henshall, Ross Jennings and Peter Jones), except where noted.

No.	Title	Length
1.	"The Last Lullaby"	2:12
2.	"Taurus"	4:43
3.	"Nightingale"	7:27
4.	"The Alphabet of Me"	5:42
5.	"Sempiternal Beings"	8:27
6.	"Beneath the White Rainbow"	6:51
7.	"Island in the Clouds"	5:52
8.	"Lovebite"	4:00
9.	"Elephants Never Forget"	11:07
10.	"Eyes of Ebony"	8:37
Total length:		1:04:58

CD 2

All songs and arrangements written by Haken, except where noted.

No.	Title	Writer(s)	Length
1.	"Puzzle Box"	Green, Griffiths, Hearne, Henshall, Jennings, Diego Tejeida	8:32
2.	"Earthrise"	Green, Griffiths, Hearne, Henshall, Jennings, Tejeida	4:50
3.	"Cockroach King"	Henshall	8:27
4.	"Nil by Mouth"	Green, Griffiths, Hearne, Henshall, Jennings, Tejeida	6:49
5.	"1985"	Green, Griffiths, Hearne, Henshall, Jennings, Tejeida	9:21
6.	"The Strain"	Green, Griffiths, Hearne, Henshall, Jennings, Tejeida	5:29
7.	"Strainwreck"	Hearne, Jones	4:03
8.	"Canary Yellow"	Green, Griffiths, Hearne, Henshall, Jennings, Tejeida	4:24
9.	"Drowning in the Flood"	Jennings, Henshall	10:00
Total length:			1:01:55

CD 3

All songs and arrangements written by Haken, except where noted.

No.	Title	Writer(s)	Length
1.	"Crystallised"	Green, Griffiths, Hearne, Henshall, Jennings, Tejeida	18:26
2.	"Visions"	Jennings, Henshall	18:28
Total length:			36:54

Blu-ray

No.	Title	Length
1.	"The Last Lullaby"	2:12
2.	"Taurus"	4:43
3.	"Nightingale"	7:27
4.	"The Alphabet of Me"	5:42
5.	"Sempiternal Beings"	8:27
6.	"Beneath the White Rainbow"	6:51
7.	"Island in the Clouds"	5:52
8.	"Lovebite"	4:00
9.	"Elephants Never Forget"	11:07
10.	"Eyes of Ebony"	8:37
11.	"Crystallised"	18:26
12.	"Puzzle Box"	8:32
13.	"Earthrise"	4:50
14.	"Cockroach King"	8:27
15.	"Nil By Mouth"	6:49
16.	"1985"	9:21
17.	"The Strain"	5:29
18.	"Strainwreck"	4:03
19.	"Canary Yellow"	4:24
20.	"Drowning in the Flood"	10:00
21.	"Visions"	18:28
22.	"Reflections: An Interview with Haken"	28:05
Total length:		3:13:24

== Personnel ==
Haken

- Ross Jennings – vocals
- Richard Henshall – guitars, keyboards, backing vocals
- Charlie Griffiths – guitars, backing vocals
- Raymond Hearne – drums, backing vocals
- Peter Jones – keyboards, backing vocals
- Conner Green – bass guitar, backing vocals

Guest musicians

- Miguel Gorodi - trumpet (on "The Alphabet Of Me")

== Charts ==
Chart performance for Liveforms: An Evening with Haken
Chart (2025)	Peak position
French Rock & Metal Albums (SNEP)	27
