= The Cocoon =

Studio album by Richard Henshall
- Released: 9 August 2019
- Genre: Progressive metal
- Length: 47:38
- Label: Hen Music
- Producer: Richard Henshall, Simon Grove

The Cocoon is the debut solo album by British guitarist and keyboardist Richard Henshall of Haken fame. It was released on 9 August 2019. It features guest performances of his Haken bandmate Ross Jennings (vocals), among other guests. The main members include bassist Conner Green (also of Haken) and Cynic drummer Matt Lynch.

It was initially planned for a 26 July release. Henshall cites Bon Iver, Meshuggah and Squarepusher as influences and says the album reflects his tastes for electronic music, jazz and metal.

The song "Twisted Shadows", which features guest performances from Jennings and from Dream Theater keyboardist Jordan Rudess, started with some improvisations at Henshall's piano and is influenced by Prince, Frank Zappa, The Dear Hunter and Meshuggah.

== Track listing ==
All lyrics are written by Richard Henshall, except "Lunar Room", written by Ben Levin; all music is composed by Henshall

No.	Title	Length
1.	"Pupa"	2:25
2.	"Cocoon"	10:26
3.	"Silken Chains"	8:10
4.	"Limbo"	3:54
5.	"Lunar Room"	8:41
6.	"Twisted Shadows"	8:46
7.	"Afterglow"	5:16
Total length:		47:38

== Personnel ==
Adapted from the album's page at Bandcamp:

- Richard Henshall - guitars, keyboards and vocals
- Conner Green - bass
- Matt Lynch - drums

Guest performances

- Ben Levin - vocals on "Lunar Room"
- Jessica Kion - vocals on "Lunar Room"
- Ross Jennings - vocals on "Twisted Shadows"
- Jordan Rudess - keyboard solo on "Twisted Shadows"
- Marco Sfogli - guitar solo on "Lunar Room"
- David Maxim Micic - guitar solo on "Silken Chains"
- Chris Baum - strings on "Afterglow"
- Adam Carrillo - saxophone on "Cocoon"

Technical personnel

- Richard Henshall - production
- Simon Grove - production, reamping, mixing and mastering
- Joe Hamilton - additional drum editing
- Sevcan Yuksel Henshall - artwork
