= To-Mera =

English band

- Origin: South Oxfordshire, England
- Genres: Progressive metal
- Years active: 2004–2014 (currently on hiatus)
- Labels: Candlelight Records; Illusionary Records
- Members: Julie Kiss; Thomas MacLean; Mark Harrington; Richard Henshall; Paul Westwood
- Past members: Akos Pirisi; Hugo Sheppard; Lee Barrett
- Website: To-Mera website

To-Mera are an English progressive metal band from South Oxfordshire. They were formed in 2004 and play a technical style of metal characterized by long songs, multiple time changes and jazz interludes.

== History ==
=== Formation of the band ===
The word 'To-Mera' has been loosely translated to mean "The Land of the Pyramid", as cited in The Secret History of Ancient Egypt by Herbie Brennan. However, the true meaning of the word is disputed. To-Mera cite their other influences as Opeth, Evergrey, Symphony X, Dream Theater and Pain of Salvation.

The idea for starting a new band came to Julie Kiss immediately after her departure from Without Face. However, it took nearly two years for the final line-up to take shape. Following her departure from the Hungarian progressive metal band Without Face, vocalist Julie Kiss decided to form the band To-Mera with bass player Lee Barrett. At the start of 2004 they began searching for full-time members and Akos Pirisi was brought in on drums, followed by guitarist Tom MacLean and a full-time keyboard player, Hugo Sheppard.

=== Split with Candlelight ===
To-Mera began writing new material towards the end of 2008. By the years end, the band confirmed that they had two songs almost complete, with a significant portion of time being dedicated to the songwriting process in 2009. In mid-2009, the band announced they had parted ways with Candlelight Records.

== Personnel ==
Current members

- Julie Kiss - vocals (2004–present)
- Thomas MacLean - guitars (2004–present)
- Paul Westwood - drums (2006–present)
- Richard Henshall - keyboards (2007–present)
- Mark Harrington - bass (2008–present)

Former members

- Hugo Sheppard - keyboards (2004-2006)
- Akos Pirisi - drums (2004-2006)
- Lee Barrett - bass (2004-2008)

== Discography ==
- (2005) Demo - The band recorded their debut demo in July 2005 at The Peel rehearsal rooms in Kingston upon Thames, and it was mixed in France by producer Brett Caldas-Lima. It was nominated "Demo of the Month" at Organ Magazine, Zero Tolerance magazine and Imperiumi.net (Finland). Candlelight Records made a multi-album, worldwide deal with To-Mera, which was signed on 7 January 2006.
- (2006) Transcendental - To-Mera recorded their debut album Transcendental in May–June 2006, with producer Brett Caldas-Lima. Drums, guitars and vocals were recorded in Veszprém (Hungary), while the bass and keyboards were recorded in London (England). The audio mixing and mastering took place at Tower Studio in Montpellier (France). The album was released in Europe on 11 September 2006 and 3 October 2006 in the USA. Transcendental received positive reviews after its release in Europe, with recognition for its ingenuity and technical proficiency. The band also received a positive four Ks review in the October 2006 issue of the British music magazine Kerrang!. The band chose to sign with The Agency Group for promotions. The Agency Group also expressed interest in getting To-Mera to play in the USA.
- (2008) Delusions - To-Mera worked on the album named Delusions which was released on 18 February 2008. A few days after the release of the album, bassist and founding member Lee Barrett announced his departure from the band, and was replaced by Mark Harrington. The band played several shows in support of the album, including a headlining slot at the Dames of Darkness festival in Birmingham, England.
- (2009) Earthbound (EP) - September saw the completion of the Earthbound EP, which was released in October.
- (2012) Exile - The band began working on their third album in late 2010 and began recording in early 2012. The record, entitled Exile, was released on 24 September of the year 2012.
