= Transcendental (album) =

Studio album by To-Mera
- Released: 11 September 2006
- Recorded: May–June 2006
- Genre: Progressive metal
- Length: 52:36
- Label: Candlelight
- Producer: Brett Caldas-Lima

To-Mera chronology
Transcendental (2006)	Delusions (2008)

Professional ratings
Review scores
Source	Rating
AllMusic	4/5 stars
Rocklouder	3/5 stars

Transcendental is the debut album from UK progressive metal band To-Mera, released 11 September 2006. Their style is characterised by female vocals, long, multi-sectioned songs, heavy riffs and jazzy sections. The album has been likened to the works of bands such as Symphony X, SikTh, The Dillinger Escape Plan and Opeth.

== Work on the album ==
The album was recorded and mixed between May and July 2006 in Hungary (drums, vocals, guitars), England (keyboards, bass) and France (Audio mixing and mastering). The cover was created by Eliran Kantor. The band liked the website he made for them so much that they took the album artwork directly from it.

The band chose Transcendental as the album title to reflect the emotional effects of their music. The idea that the title was chosen to hint at the Transcendental Études written by Hungarian composer Franz Liszt - which were considered some of the most technical musical pieces of their time - has been denied by the band.

== Track listing ==
No.	Title	Length
1.	"Traces"	3:13
2.	"Blood (Note: partly written in Hungarian)"	5:36
3.	"Dreadful Angel"	6:52
4.	"Phantoms"	7:18
5.	"Born of Ashes"	7:04
6.	"Parfum"	6:32
7.	"Obscure Oblivion"	6:17
8.	"Realm of Dreams"	9:44
Total length:		52:36

== Credits ==
- Julie Kiss - Vocals
- Thomas MacLean - Guitar
- Lee Barrett - Bass
- Hugo Sheppard - Keyboards
- Akos Pirisi - Drums

== Release history ==
The album was released on 11 September 2006 in Europe and 3 October 2006 in the US.
