= Fauna (Haken album) =

Studio album by Haken
- Released: 3 March 2023
- Recorded: 2022
- Studio: The Crypt (London)
- Length: 62:11
- Label: Inside Out Music
- Producer: Haken

Haken chronology
| Virus (2020) | Fauna (2023) | Liveforms (2025) |

Singles from Fauna
- 1. "Nightingale" Released: 26 April 2022; 2. "The Alphabet of Me" Released: 9 December 2022; 3. "Taurus" Released: 18 January 2023; 4. "Lovebite" Released: 14 February 2023

Professional ratings
Review scores
| Source | Rating |
|---|---|
| AllMusic | 4.5/5 stars |
| Metal Injection | 8.5/10 stars |

Fauna is the seventh studio album by English progressive metal band Haken. It was released on 3 March 2023 through Inside Out Music. The album is the first release without keyboardist Diego Tejeida, who left the band in 2021. Founding member Peter Jones served as his replacement. The first single "Nightingale" was released on 26 April 2022, when the band had not yet started to record the whole album. The second single "The Alphabet of Me" was first announced, along with the cover art and name of the album, at their website with a puzzle game.

In February 2025, a live album was announced by the name of Liveforms, which contains a live performance of Fauna in its entirety.

Fauna is their last studio album featuring guitarist Charlie Griffiths and bassist Conner Green, who both left the band in early 2026.

== Background ==
About the origin of the album, singer Ross Jennings said:

When composing and presenting initial song sketches, we very much had an "anything goes" mentality, and whilst sounding atypically Haken, it was a piece that was all exciting us to explore and integrate into our song canon. Where the lyrics are concerned, I leant heavily on one of my favourite writers Philip K. Dick, for inspiration. Keeping our loose concept of spirit animals in mind, I re-read 'Do robots dream of electric sheep?' (Which would later be adapted into the 1982 film 'Blade Runner') knowing symbolically that animals played a key role in the story. This, along with revisiting both movies from the Blade Runner franchise, opened up some deeper philosophical topics about the nature of identity which have served as a backbone for the lyrical content.

The singer added:

The premise of the album when we started writing it was that every song would have an animal assigned to it. They all have something related to the animal kingdom that we could write about, but they also connect to the human world. Each track has layers, and some of them are more obvious than others.

Guitarist Richard Henshall followed:

It reminds me of 'The Mountain'. There, we had the idea of not really a narrative-based album, but more the concept of climbing a mountain and overcoming the obstacles along the way. Then we took that and thought about how it could relate to our everyday lives. All of Fauna's animals relate to us, personally".

== Track listing ==
Fauna track listing
| No. | Title | Length |
|---|---|---|
| 1. | "Taurus" | 4:49 |
| 2. | "Nightingale" | 7:24 |
| 3. | "The Alphabet of Me" | 5:33 |
| 4. | "Sempiternal Beings" | 8:23 |
| 5. | "Beneath the White Rainbow" | 6:45 |
| 6. | "Island in the Clouds" | 5:45 |
| 7. | "Lovebite" | 3:49 |
| 8. | "Elephants Never Forget" | 11:07 |
| 9. | "Eyes of Ebony" | 8:32 |
| Total length: | | 62:11 |

Japanese edition bonus track
| No. | Title | Length |
|---|---|---|
| 10. | "The Last Lullaby" | 3:14 |
| Total length: | | 65:25 |

== Personnel ==
Haken

- Ross Jennings – vocals
- Richard Henshall – guitars
- Charlie Griffiths – guitars
- Peter Jones – keyboards
- Conner Green – bass
- Raymond Hearne – drums

Additional musicians

- Miguel Gorodi – trumpet (on The Alphabet Of Me)

Production and design

- Haken – production
- Paul Winstanley – engineering
- Linus Corneliusson – engineering
- Jens Bogren – mixing
- Tony Lindgren – mastering
- Dan Goldsworthy – artwork
- Max Taylor Grant - photography

== Charts ==
Chart performance for Fauna
| Chart (2023) | Peak position |
|---|---|
| Austrian Albums (Ö3 Austria) | 24 |
| Belgian Albums (Ultratop Flanders) | 102 |
| Belgian Albums (Ultratop Wallonia) | 116 |
| Dutch Albums (Album Top 100) | 89 |
| Finnish Albums (Suomen virallinen lista) | 19 |
| French Albums (SNEP) | 159 |
| German Albums (Offizielle Top 100) | 13 |
| Italian Albums (FIMI) | 95 |
| Portuguese Albums (AFP) | 32 |
| Scottish Albums (OCC) | 15 |
| Swiss Albums (Schweizer Hitparade) | 12 |
| UK Album Downloads (OCC) | 26 |
| UK Rock & Metal Albums (OCC) | 2 |
