= Restoration (EP) =

EP by Haken
- Released: 27 October 2014
- Recorded: 2014
- Studio: The Crypt (London)
- Genre: Progressive metal; progressive rock
- Length: 33:59
- Label: Inside Out Music
- Producer: Haken

Haken chronology
| The Mountain (2013) | Restoration (2014) | Affinity (2016) |

Restoration is an EP by English progressive metal band Haken, that was released on 27 October 2014 through Inside Out Music. It is the first release of the band to feature bassist Conner Green and the second with producer and mixer Jens Bogren, who did his job at his Fascination Street Studios.

== Background and recording ==
The EP was announced on 8 September 2014 via Haken's Facebook page. The EP's three tracks are reworked songs from their 2008 demo, Enter the 5th Dimension. Commenting on the option of reworking old tracks, guitarist Charlie Griffiths said:

Merely re-recording the demo songs would have felt musically redundant and dishonest, since three of us [keyboardist Diego Tejeida; Green and Griffiths himself] didn't play on the original recordings. The band's sound has evolved considerably in the last few years so we used the demo tracks as a starting point and gave ourselves free reign [sic] to reimagine them and make them relevant to who we are today. These are now the definitive versions and we couldn't be happier with how they turned out.

The ending song, "Crystallised"—which is based on the track "Snow", -- is 19 minutes long and features guest performances from guitarist Pete Rinaldi (Headspace) and drummer Mike Portnoy (The Winery Dogs, Flying Colors, Dream Theater, ex-Adrenaline Mob). The band initially said Portnoy would not play the drums nor sing.

Commenting on Portnoy's guest performance, drummer Raymond Hearne said:

Mike Portnoy has been very generous with his support for the band since we released The Mountain last year. As if the man wasn't busy enough, we thought it would be nice to feature a little cameo performance from him (just for a bit of fun really) and it's flattering to now be at the stage where a musician of Mike's calibre is so willing to get involved with six guys who have always been great admirers of his music.

The band later promoted a contest in which people were invited to guess what Portnoy did in the song. They then announced the winner and revealed that Portnoy played the gong a few seconds before the end of the track.

On September 24, the band released a promotional video for "Darkest Light". The song is based on the track "Blind", originally clocking at 11:40. According to Hearne, the band managed to produce a half as long version after cutting away "all the excess fat". Both songs serve as the opening track of their respective releases.

The song "Earthlings" is based on the demo "Black Seed".

== Track listing ==
All music is composed by Richard Henshall, Ross Jennings, Raymond Hearne, Charlie Griffiths, Diego Tejeida and Conner Green.

| No. | Title | Lyrics | Length |
|---|---|---|---|
| 1. | "Darkest Light" | Ross Jennings | 6:44 |
| 2. | "Earthlings" | Raymond Hearne | 7:52 |
| 3. | "Crystallised" (featuring Pete Rinaldi and Mike Portnoy) | Hearne; Charlie Griffiths; Richard Henshall | 19:23 |
| Total length: | | | 33:59 |

== Personnel ==
Haken

- Ross Jennings – lead vocals
- Richard Henshall – guitars, keyboards
- Charlie Griffiths – guitars
- Conner Green – bass
- Diego Tejeida – keyboards, sound design
- Raymond Hearne – drums, backing vocals

Additional Musicians

- Pete Rinaldi – acoustic guitar (track 3)
- Mike Portnoy – gong (track 3)

Production and design

- Jerry Guidroz – recording (gong)
- Anthony Leung – recording (drums)
- Jens Bogren – mixing, mastering
- Blacklake – artwork, design
