= Delusions (To-Mera album) =

Studio album by To-Mera
- Released: 18 February 2008
- Recorded: Tower Studios, Montpellier, France, August–September 2007
- Genre: Progressive metal
- Length: 62:04
- Label: Candlelight
- Producer: Brett Caldas-Lima

To-Mera chronology
Transcendental (2006)	Delusions (2008)	Earthbound (2009)

Professional ratings
Review scores
Source	Rating
Allmusic	4/5 stars

Delusions is the second album from the British progressive metal band To-Mera. Its musical style is similar to that of their debut album Transcendental.

The album was initially released in a limited edition glossy slipcase featuring the band logo embroidered onto it. This was available directly through the band website and was limited to 2000 copies, all of which are now sold out.

The artwork was once again done by Eliran Kantor.

== Track listing ==
All lyrics by Julie Kiss, music as noted

1. "The Lie" (Lee Barrett, Tom MacLean) - 7:29
2. "Mirage" (MacLean) - 7:11
3. "The Glory of a New Day" (MacLean) - 8:24
4. "Inside the Hourglass" (MacLean) - 8:19
5. "A Sorrow to Kill" (MacLean) - 8:03
6. "Asylum" (MacLean) - 5:40
7. "Fallen From Grace" (MacLean, Hugo Sheppard) - 8:18
8. "Temptation" (Sheppard) - 8:40

== Personnel ==
Band members

- Julie Kiss - vocals
- Thomas MacLean - guitars
- Hugo Sheppard - keyboards
- Lee Barrett - bass
- Paul Westwood - drums

Additional musicians

- Laurence Hill - percussion
- Hugh Greenish - saxophone and bass clarinet

Production

- Brett Caldas-Lima - producer, engineer, mixing, orchestration
