= Vector (album) =

Studio album by Haken
- Released: 26 October 2018
- Recorded: 2018
- Studio: The Crypt Studio, London; The Bunker, Mexico City
- Genre: Progressive metal, djent
- Length: 45:42
- Label: Inside Out Music
- Producer: Haken

Haken chronology
L-1VE (2018)	Vector (2018)	L+1VE (2018)

Singles from Vector
- 1. "The Good Doctor" Released: 31 August 2018; 2. "Puzzle Box" Released: 28 September 2018; 3. "A Cell Divides" Released: 19 October 2018

Vector is the fifth studio album by English progressive metal band Haken. It was released on 26 October 2018 through Inside Out Music. It is the shortest studio album by the band and the first with a duration of less than one hour. The album was produced by the band and mixed by ex-Periphery bassist and producer Adam "Nolly" Getgood.

The album's first single, "The Good Doctor", was released on 31 August 2018 along with its official music video. The album's second single, "Puzzle Box", was released on 28 September 2018 for digital download, following the daily publication of six scrambled parts from it in the spirit of the song's theme. The original version of "Puzzle Box" is created when the scrambled parts are put into the correct order. A third single, "A Cell Divides", was released digitally on 19 October, along with its video clip.

The artwork was created by long-time collaborators Blacklake, which features a Rorschach test ink-blot design. The album is loosely connected to their following album Virus, released on 24 July 2020.

== Background ==
About the album, vocalist Ross Jennings commented:

We don't like to make simple music. We always aim to defy expectations, and I believe we've surpassed what we aimed to achieve with our new album [...] We produced the album ourselves, as we always do, but we're fans of what Adam has done with Periphery, Sikth and Devin Townsend. He has a great reputation for the heavier end of our genre.

Guitarist Charlie Griffiths added:

We've always had a heavy influence, but it was obvious from the riffs that were naturally coming out of us early in the writing process that this would be a more metal album. These are some of the most riff driven songs we've ever written.

== Concept ==
Regarding the album's concept, Griffiths said:

Musically it feels like a logical step from 'Affinity', but lyrically it's a bit more theatrical and about as 'rock opera' as Haken has ever got. It's about a Doctor with an intriguing, perhaps sinister interest in a particular patient. From there the story enters the point-of-view of the patient – who appears to be catatonic, but his mind is sparking with what could be memories, or delusions brought on by the treatment he's receiving – we leave this up to the listeners to decide [...] And that’s the challenge for the fans – to find out for themselves their own meaning for Vector as an album.

When asked about the concept, keyboardist Diego Tejeida stated that the field of psychology was involved, as well as influences from psychoanalysis, Freudian theories, the Milgram experiments, Pavlovian conditioning, and operant conditioning experiments.

== Critical reception ==
Professional ratings
Review scores
Source	Rating
AllMusic	4/5 stars
Sonic Perspectives	9.3/10

Concluding the review for AllMusic, Thom Jurek wrote that "Haken's willingness to take chances keeps older fans in the fold because here, they've balanced a far more aggressive direction with more nuanced elements from each phase of their recorded development. Vector is at once a brave new chapter and a logical -- if surprising -- continuation of Haken's always expansive M.O."

Nick Andreas from Sonic Perspectives gave Vector 9.3 out of 10 and said: "The only major strike against Vector, if it really is one, is that we only get forty-five minutes of music. But that's all good in my book, as the band seemed to go with quality over quantity in delivering a brilliant album that might be their best sounding yet. It shows off some fresh new styles, and sees the instrumentation again finding new sounds and rhythmic approaches, all of course centered around the group's always-solid songwriting."

== Track listing ==
All tracks are written by Haken.

No.	Title	Length
1.	"Clear" (instrumental)	1:50
2.	"The Good Doctor"	3:55
3.	"Puzzle Box"	7:42
4.	"Veil"	12:35
5.	"Nil by Mouth" (instrumental)	6:51
6.	"Host"	6:45
7.	"A Cell Divides" (4:57 on the digital version)	6:04
Total length:		45:42

The deluxe edition of the album includes instrumental versions of all songs. The digital deluxe edition is missing the instrumental songs "Clear" and "Nil by Mouth". Also while the outro "Verbal Summator" is missing at the end of "A Cell Divides" on the digital version of the album, it is included in the instrumental version of the song.

== Personnel ==
Haken

- Ross Jennings – vocals
- Richard Henshall – guitars
- Charlie Griffiths – guitars
- Diego Tejeida – keyboards
- Connor Green – bass
- Raymond Hearne – drums

Additional personnel

- Miguel Gorodi – trumpets ("The Good Doctor"), flugelhorn ("Host")
- Pete Jones – additional drum programming ("Puzzle Box")
- Pete Rinaldi – additional guitars ("Veil" and "Host")

Production and design

- Haken – production
- Anthony Leung – drum engineering
- Adam "Nolly" Getgood – drum engineering, mixing, drum recording
- Diego Tejeida – vocal production, engineering, sound design
- Chris McKenzie – vocal assistant engineering
- Sebastian Sendon – assistant mixing
- Ermin Hamidovic – mastering
- Blacklake – artwork, design
- Corey Meyers – logo

== Charts ==
Chart (2018)	Peak position
Austrian Albums (Ö3 Austria)	37
Belgian Albums (Ultratop Flanders)	91
Belgian Albums (Ultratop Wallonia)	198
Dutch Albums (Album Top 100)	94
Finnish Albums (Suomen virallinen lista)	20
German Albums (Offizielle Top 100)	22
Italian Albums (FIMI)	81
Scottish Albums (OCC)	47
Swiss Albums (Schweizer Hitparade)	24
