= Aquarius (Haken album) =

Studio album by Haken
- Released: 30 March 2010
- Recorded: 2009–2010
- Venue: Guildhall School of Music and Drama (London)
- Studios: Monster Trax Studio (Newark, UK)
- Genres: Progressive metal; symphonic metal; progressive rock
- Length: 72:56
- Label: Sensory
- Producers: Loz Anslow; Tommy Ashby; Christian Moos; Richard Henshall

Haken chronology
| Enter the 5th Dimension (2008) | Aquarius (2010) | Visions (2011) |

Aquarius is the debut studio album by English progressive metal band Haken. Despite the band having released two previous demos, none of the multiple songs already recorded were re-released on this album. A 22-minute medley of the whole album, except for the song "Sun", was included in their live album L-1VE.

Aquarius was largely written on the piano by guitarist/keyboardist Richard Henshall and then developed with contributions from the rest of the band. Its track lengths are typical of progressive rock and progressive metal, with the shortest track being just under 7 minutes and the longest being nearly 17. It is a concept album about a mermaid, discovered by a fisherman and sold to a circus, whose blood is the only thing capable of saving the human race from a flood resulting from global warming issues. She ultimately dies for mankind's sake.

The album artwork was created by Dennis Sibeijn, who has also worked with 3, Job for a Cowboy, and See You Next Tuesday, among others.

== Album breakdown ==
The Point Of No Return

The album opens up with the song "The Point Of No Return". In the song we learn about a couple that is expecting a baby. In the birth of the child, the couple sees that the child is a mermaid and decides to throw the child into the sea.

Streams

In the song "Streams" we learn that the child from before is happy in the sea swimming with the fish. The song also uses harsh vocals to showcase the mermaid's insecurities.

Aquarium

The third song "Aquarium" opens from the perspective of a fisherman who finds the mermaid while fishing. The fisherman captures the mermaid and puts her in his Aquarium for people to see. In the chorus, the mermaid shouts at the fisherman to release her. In the middle of the song we find out that the fisherman and the mermaid fell in love despite what he had done to her.

Eternal Rain

The song "Eternal Rain" takes the story to a darker tone, An approaching storm is threatening to end humanity and scientists found a way to save humanity that involves the mermaid. The fisherman also releases the mermaid.

Drowning in the Flood

In the fifth song "Drowning In The Flood" the storm is coming and causes a wave of destruction. Scientists have found a way to save humanity at the cost of her life and she accepts her fate. The fisherman hasn't taken it well and he is drowning in the flood while he is heartbroken.

Sun

The song "Sun" brings all the emotions to the front. The fisherman grieves over the mermaid's death thinking it was his fault that she died. He thinks that if he had never discovered her she might have lived. He thinks that maybe humanity would have found a different way to survive if he had not found her and that maybe humanity would have gone extinct but it would be worth it if she survives.

Celestial Elixir

The grand finale of the album "Celestial Elixir" tells us that her sacrifice worked. Her blood was able to create a cure that turns humans into mermaids giving them the ability to survive the flood. The life of the mermaid was a tragic one, the fisherman survives with only her memory.

== Reception ==
Professional ratings
Review scores
| Source | Rating |
|---|---|
| AllMusic | 3.5/5 stars |
| Classic Rock Magazine | positive |

The reception of this album was generally positive.

Eduardo Rivadavia of AllMusic praised it as the strongest prog album yet to come out in the 2010s. Classic Rock Magazine featured the song "Eternal Rain" as a free track of the day on 15 April 2010. The small review given was positive, calling it "interesting music from a young London band who combine jazz, metal and prog, delivered with excellent musicianship."

In 2024, Loudwire elected it as one of the 11 best progressive metal debut albums.

== Track listing ==
All lyrics are written by Ross Jennings; all music is composed by Richard Henshall.

| No. | Title | Length |
|---|---|---|
| 1. | "The Point of No Return" | 11:28 |
| 2. | "Streams": I. "Streams"; II. "Veins"; III. "Digression" | 10:16 |
| 3. | "Aquarium" | 10:45 |
| 4. | "Eternal Rain" | 6:38 |
| 5. | "Drowning in the Flood" | 9:28 |
| 6. | "Sun" | 7:20 |
| 7. | "Celestial Elixir" | 17:01 |
| Total length: | | 72:56 |

== Personnel ==
Haken

- Ross Jennings – vocals
- Richard "Hen" Henshall – guitar and keyboards
- Charlie Griffiths – guitar
- Thomas MacLean – bass guitar
- Ray Hearne – drums, tuba, djembe
- Diego Tejeida – keyboards

Additional musicians

- Craig Beattie – trombone
- Alex Benwell – trumpet
- Pablo Inda Garcia – clarinet
- Marged Hall – harp
- Darren Moore – trumpet
- Jon Roskilly – trombone
- Dave Ruff – flute

Production and design

- Misha Nikolic – recording (drums)
- Tony Ashby – recording (additional)
- Loz Anslow – recording (additional)
- Christian Moos – mixing
- Eroc – mastering
- Dennis Sibeijn – artwork, design
