= Virus (Haken album) =

Studio album by Haken
- Released: 24 July 2020
- Studio: The Crypt (London)
- Genre: Progressive metal, progressive rock, djent
- Length: 51:54 (International release); 55:59 (Japanese release)
- Label: Inside Out Music

Haken chronology
L+1VE (2018)	Virus (2020)	Fauna (2023)

Singles from Virus
- 1. "Prosthetic" Released: 3 April 2020; 2. "Canary Yellow" Released: 1 May 2020; 3. "Invasion" Released: 22 May 2020

Virus is the sixth studio album by English progressive metal band Haken. It was released on 24 July 2020 (postponed three times, first from 5 June 2020, then from 19 June 2020 and finally from 10 July 2020) through Inside Out Music. According to the band's guitarist and primary songwriter, Richard Henshall, the album is loosely connected to their 2018 release Vector. As well as the latter, Virus was mixed by ex-Periphery bassist Adam "Nolly" Getgood and the artwork was created by long-time collaborators Blacklake. It is the last album featuring keyboardist Diego Tejeida, who left the band the following year.

The first single, "Prosthetic" was released on 3 April 2020, along with a music video. About the song, the band said:

Prosthetic was the first song we completed during the Virus writing sessions and we always felt it would be the perfect opener for the album. It's a very guitar heavy track with its roots in 80s thrash riffing, but with the unconventional rhythmic twists and turns we often like to explore in Haken. We sadly never had a Jeff Hanneman and Robert Fripp collaboration, but this song at least draws on inspiration from them both! Lyrically the song is a bridge between our two albums Vector and Virus.

== Background ==
Haken had been secretly writing the music for Virus and all the initial ideas were created back when they were writing Vector at the end of 2017, soon after touring with Mike Portnoy in live reproductions of his Twelve-step Suite. The album title generated surprise as it was announced during the COVID-19 pandemic, but vocalist Ross Jennings said it was just coincidental; back in 2017 the members wanted their fifth and sixth albums to begin with the letters "V" and "VI", respectively, to allude to the numbers 5 and 6 in Roman numerals. Jennings says touring with Portnoy with a conceptual series of songs did not influence them into creating the concepts that would result in the albums.

Despite the albums being connected, Vector was initially not promoted as a first half of something bigger because the band wanted it to be treated as a whole and in its own right. Conversely, Virus can be listened to even by people who don't know Vector yet.

While the band is used to arranging songs remotely, this time they had some time to conceive them together while touring with Devin Townsend.

== Concept, themes and composition ==
The album continues the story from Vector while expanding a concept initiated with "Cockroach King" from their 2013 album The Mountain. According to Henshall, "we wanted to provide a back story to the protagonist we introduced in that [song]. So, on Vector we see the character institutionalised, then, with Virus, the narrative follows his maniacal downfall." The epic song "Messiah Complex" references melodies and themes from that song. According to Jennings, it explores the "ideology of a tyrannical government, the narcissism that surrounds it and seeing the rise and fall of the Cockroach King as a political virus. It’s a fictional tale but there's also an element of putting a mirror up to the negative world we live in." Henshall also said the song was based on one of the final riffs present in the initial version of "Nil by Mouth", from Vector, which was originally 11 minutes long.

The themes present in the album are institutional abuse, physical and mentally abusive relationships, anxiety, depression and suicidal tendencies.

== Track listing ==
Original release
No.	Title	Length
1.	"Prosthetic"	5:58
2.	"Invasion"	6:42
3.	"Carousel"	10:29
4.	"The Strain"	5:23
5.	"Canary Yellow"	4:14
6.	"Messiah Complex I: Ivory Tower"	3:57
7.	"Messiah Complex II: A Glutton for Punishment"	3:38
8.	"Messiah Complex III: Marigold"	2:24
9.	"Messiah Complex IV: The Sect"	2:02
10.	"Messiah Complex V: Ectobius Rex"	4:57
11.	"Only Stars"	2:10
Total length:		51:54

Japanese edition bonus track
No.	Title	Length
12.	"Canary Yellow" (Acoustic Version)	4:05
Total length:		56:05

== Reception ==
The album has received generally positive reviews from music critics. According to critic Thom Jurek, it successfully challenges tropes from progressive metal, and he lauded the harmonic and rhythmic complexities of the tracks.

Some critics also noted the musical similarities between the album and the works of bands like Meshuggah and Dream Theater.

== Personnel ==
Haken

- Ross Jennings – vocals
- Richard Henshall – guitars
- Charlie Griffiths – guitars
- Diego Tejeida – keyboards
- Conner Green – bass
- Raymond Hearne – drums

Additional personnel

- Pete Jones – additional keyboards on "Messiah Complex", drum programming on "The Strain", production and arrangement on "Only Stars"
- Pete Rinaldi – acoustic guitar on "Prosthetic" and "Messiah Complex"
- Adam "Nolly" Getgood – bass solo on "Messiah Complex"

Production and design

- Adam "Nolly" Getgood – mixing, drum engineering
- Anthony Leung – drum engineering
- James Stephenson – drum editing
- Chris McKenzie – assistant vocal engineering
- Ermin Hamidovic – mastering
- Blacklake – art and design
- Corey Meyers – logo
- Jeroen Moons – web design

== Charts ==
Chart performance for Virus
Chart (2020)	Peak position
Austrian Albums (Ö3 Austria)	25
Belgian Albums (Ultratop Flanders)	66
Belgian Albums (Ultratop Wallonia)	48
Dutch Albums (Album Top 100)	30
Finnish Albums (Suomen virallinen lista)	12
French Albums (SNEP)	142
German Albums (Offizielle Top 100)	12
Hungarian Albums (MAHASZ)	33
Italian Albums (FIMI)	63
Spanish Albums (PROMUSICAE)	99
Swiss Albums (Schweizer Hitparade)	7
UK Albums (OCC)	91
