= Thomas MacLean =

Tom MacLean
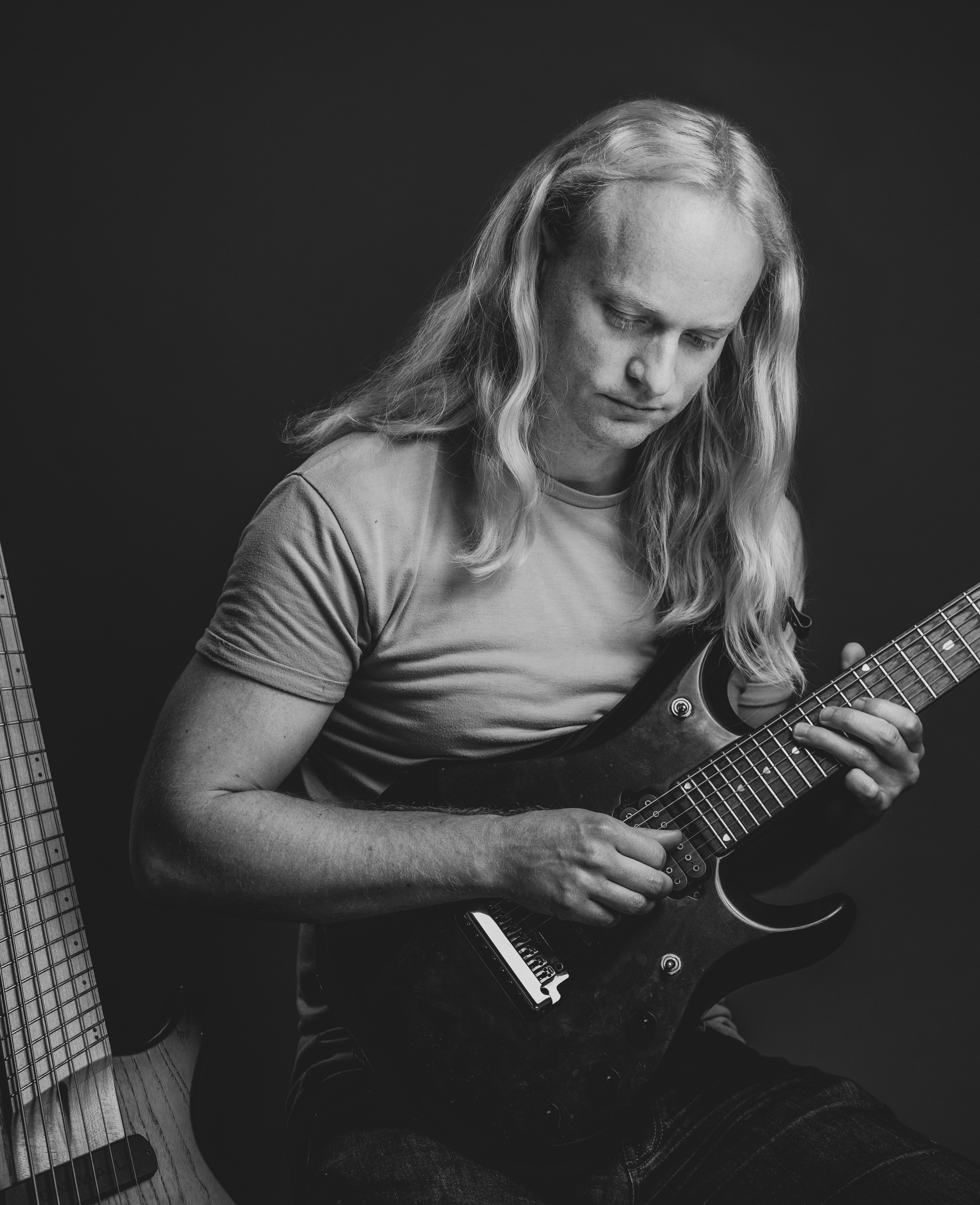
- Tom Maclean in 2021.

Background information
- Origin: England
- Genres: Progressive metal, progressive rock, heavy metal
- Occupations: Guitarist, Bassist, Producer
- Instruments: Guitar, bass guitar, keyboards
- Years active: 2005–present
- Labels: Candlelight Records, Sensory Records, Inside Out
- Member of: To-Mera, Psion
- Formerly of: Haken
- Website: Tom MacLean's personal website

Tom MacLean is an English progressive metal multi-instrumentalist. He is best known as the guitarist of To-Mera and as the former bassist of Haken. MacLean was taught the classical guitar at the age of 10 and changed to electric at 14. It was not until he was 25 that he started to play the bass in order to join Haken. Since leaving Haken, MacLean has been a member of the progressive metal band Psion.

== To-Mera ==
To-Mera formed in 2005 between a few friends: Julie Kiss (vocals), Lee Barrett (bass), Akos Pirisi (drums), Hugo Sheppard (keyboard), and MacLean. They released a demo, which caught the attention of Candlelight Records. The band's musical style was drastically different from conventional progressive metal; the band drew upon a plethora of influences such as progressive rock. In 2006, Candlelight released Transcendental. In 2008, To-Mera released their next album, Delusions, in 2008. In 2009, they parted with Candlelight. Hugo Sheppard left after this, and they recruited Richard Henshall for the post. They then self released the Earthbound EP. Their next full length, "Exile", was released in September of 2012.

== Haken ==
Haken was formed by school friends Ross Jennings, Matthew Marshall, and Richard Henshall at first in 2004. The members parted ways for a while to study at university, reuniting in 2007. The current members found Peter Jones on keyboards and Raymond Hearne on drums. Jones left soon after, and was replaced by Diego Tejeida. Charlie Griffiths was hired as their guitarist, and Henshall brought in To-Mera bandmate Maclean on bass. They released two demos in 2007 and 2008, which received excellent reviews. Their music caught the attention of Sensory Records, and the first album, Aquarius, was released in 2010. MacLean left Haken in 2013 and was replaced by Conner Green.

== Psion ==
In May 2015, Tom MacLean co-founded Psion, a progressive metal band that includes drummer Jasper Barendregt, guitarist Nikolas Wolf, and lead vocalist Bryan Ramage. Psion released their self-titled debut EP on 1 September 2017 and made it available for streaming on Bandcamp.

== Twelve Tone Studio ==
At the end of 2019, Tom MacLean launched his mixing and mastering service, Twelve Tone Studio, for rock, metal, and alternative artists.

== Discography ==
=== With To-Mera ===
- Demo (2005)
- Transcendental (2006)
- Delusions (2008)
- Earthbound (EP, 2009)
- Exile (2012)

=== With Haken ===
- Demo (2007)
- Enter the 5th Dimension (2008)
- Aquarius (2010)
- Visions (2011)
- The Mountain (2013)

=== With Psion ===
- Psion (EP, 2017)

=== With Athemon ===
- Athemon (2021)

=== With Brutta ===
- Brutta (2022)

=== With Horasan ===
- Horasan (EP, 2022)
