= Haken (band) =

English progressive metal band

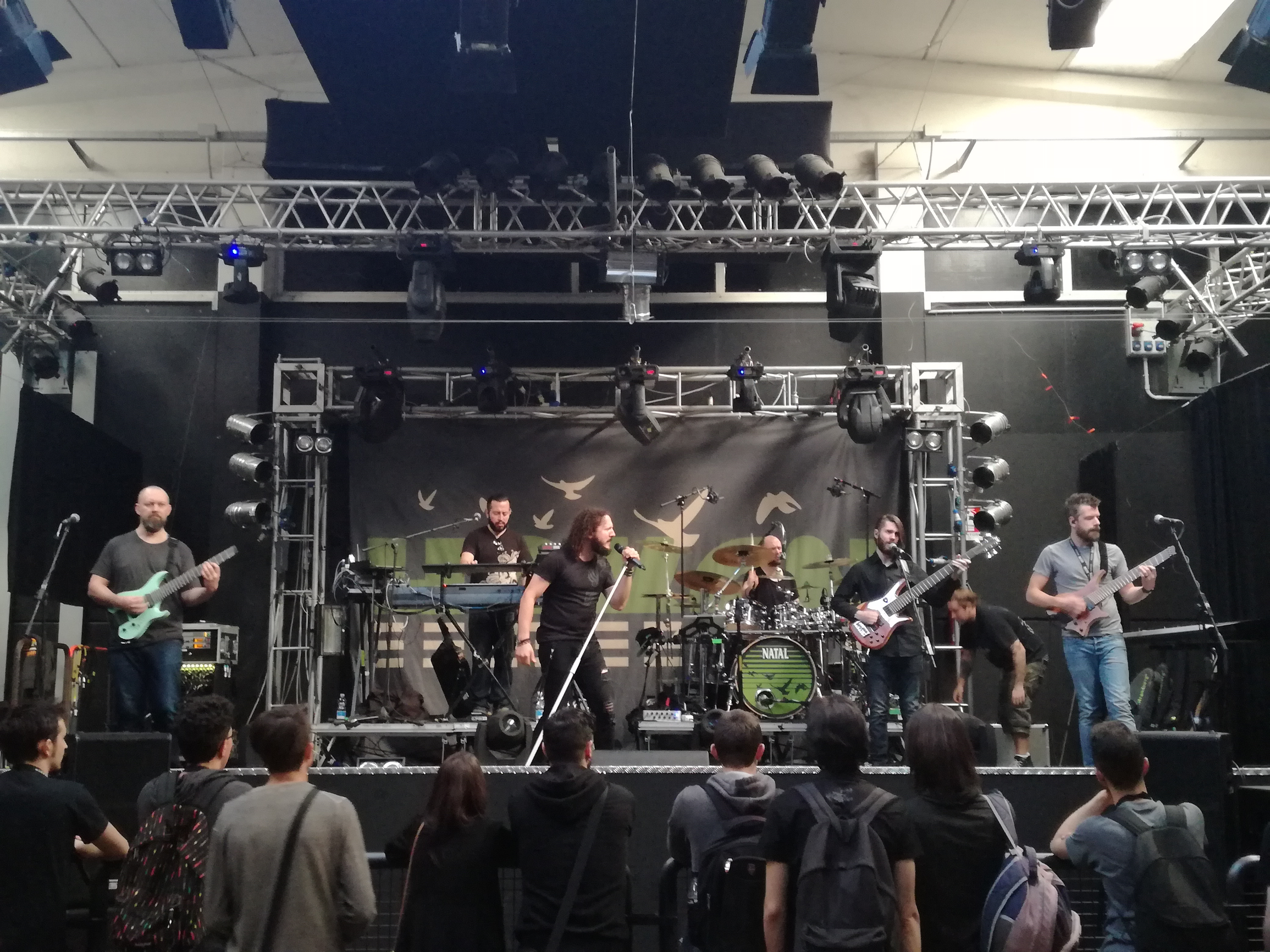
- Haken performing in 2017. Left to right: Charles Griffiths, Diego Tejeida, Ross Jennings, Ray Hearne, Conner Green, and Richard Henshall.

Background information
- Origin: London, England
- Genres: Progressive metal; progressive rock
- Years active: 2007–present
- Labels: Sensory; Inside Out
- Members: Ross Jennings; Richard Henshall; Raymond Hearne; Peter Jones
- Past members: Matthew Marshall; Thomas MacLean; Diego Tejeida; Charles Griffiths; Conner Green
- Website: hakenmusic.com

Haken (/ˈheɪkən/) are an English progressive metal band formed in 2007 by multi-instrumentalist Richard Henshall, guitarist Matthew Marshall, and vocalist Ross Jennings. While Henshall, Marshall, and Jennings first had the idea of forming Haken in 2004, they opted to pursue their instruments and songwriting first. Upon recruiting other members three years later, they eventually released the demo Enter the 5th Dimension in 2008, signing with Sensory Records and releasing their first album, Aquarius, in 2010. As of 2026, they have released seven studio albums, two EPs, and two live albums.

== History ==
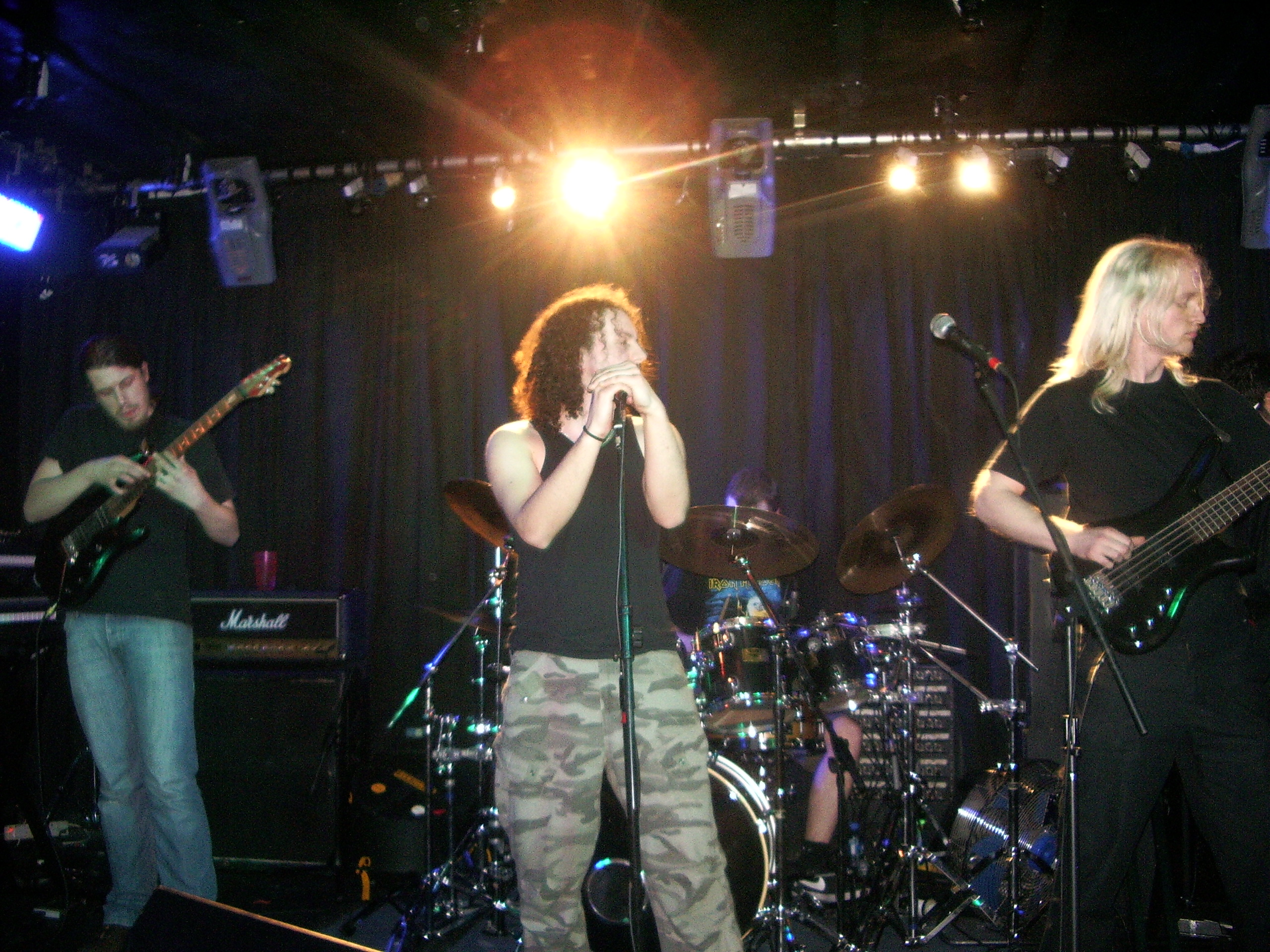
Haken performing live in 2009. From left to right: Henshall, Jennings, Hearne, and Thomas MacLean.

=== Early years (2007–2009) ===
Richard Henshall, Matthew Marshall, and Ross Jennings had grown up as friends in their teenage years and first had the idea to form Haken in 2004, when they would regularly play together in "casual bedroom jams". Henshall mentioned on some occasions that "Haken" was the name of a fictional character he and some friends came up with in their school days, under the influence of alcohol or weed. At the time the three considered the jams a hobby, but they eventually chose to focus on studying their instruments and rejoined three years later to form the band. Early on, Jennings ended up parting ways with Henshall and Marshall as their guitar skills far eclipsed his own. He would later be asked to re-join as solely a vocalist. They completed their lineup with a keyboardist they met on an online forum, Pete Jones, as well as Jones' close friend Raymond Hearne. To-Mera guitarist Thomas MacLean became the band's bassist.

Haken recorded a demo in 2007, followed by a full-length demo titled Enter the 5th Dimension in 2008. Later that year, Marshall and Jones left the band to pursue other careers; the latter focused on his studies in theoretical physics and data science.

Charlie Griffiths, the guitarist for the band Linear Sphere and Anchorhead, became a full-time member of the band. Griffiths parted ways with Linear Sphere because he wanted to go in a different direction musically. Keyboardist Diego Tejeida auditioned and eventually joined the band in late 2008 as well.

=== Aquarius, Visions, The Mountain, and MacLean's departure (2010–2013) ===
Ken Golden of Sensory Records offered them a record deal after a referral. They began recording for their debut album, Aquarius, soon after and released it in March 2010. Haken released their second album, Visions, in October 2011.

Haken announced their third album, The Mountain, on 20 June 2013. The album, released on 2 September by Inside Out Music, was mixed and mastered by Jens Bogren. On 25 September, Haken announced that MacLean would be leaving the band after completing the Prog Stage Festival in Israel in October 2013. After a series of auditions, his position was filled by Conner Green.

=== Restoration EP and Affinity (2014–2017) ===
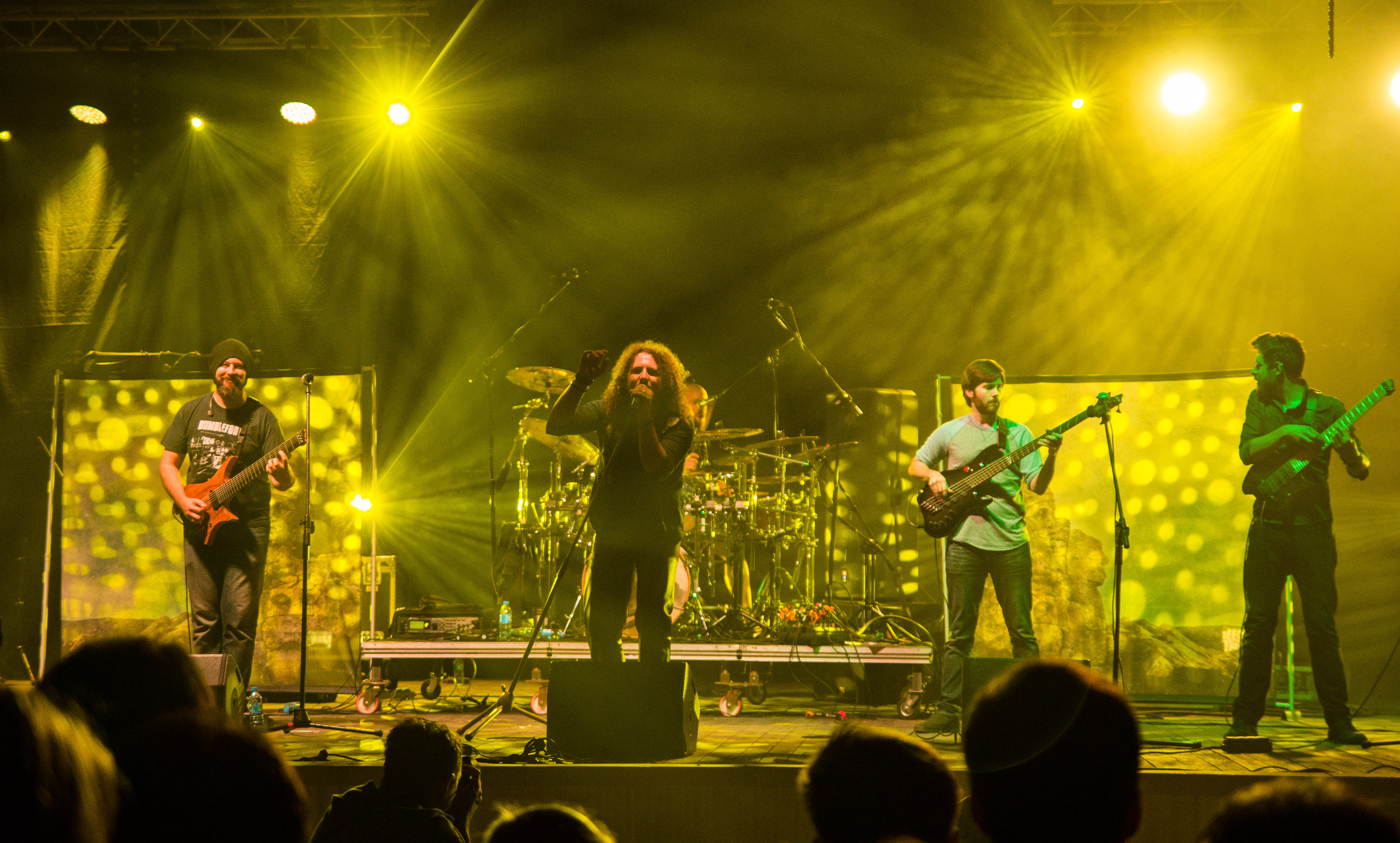
Haken performing at the 2014 Ino Rock Festival.

Haken released Restoration on 27 October 2014. This EP contained three reworked tracks from Enter the 5th Dimension. "Darkest Light", a reworked version of "Blind", was released with a music video featuring footage from the recording process of Restoration on 24 September. Shortly before, the band announced on Facebook that they had begun writing their fourth album.

On 9 February 2016, a press release along with a micro site called "Haken OS 4.0.1" was released with information about their upcoming album Affinity. To promote the album, a long series of teasers had been posted by the band, jokingly referring to the new album as Verbatim. The official music video for the lead single, "Initiate", was released online on 18 March 2016. It was released on Inside Out Music on 29 April 2016. Affinity is seen as the first release on which all members of the band contributed to its songwriting. During this period, Jennings formed the side project Novena, which released the EP Secondary Genesis in 2016.

Haken began to tour with Dream Theater drummer Mike Portnoy and Neal Morse Band guitarist Eric Gillette in 2017, performing the Twelve-step Suite in its entirety (among other Dream Theater songs), the outfit named Mike Portnoy's Shattered Fortress. They also reissued their first two albums that year.

=== Vector and Virus (2018–2020) ===
On 13 April 2018, the band announced the release of their first live album, titled L-1VE. It was recorded and filmed on 13 April 2017, at the Melkweg venue in Amsterdam during their tenth-anniversary tour. The live audio was mixed by Neal Morse and The Winery Dogs alumnus Jerry Guidroz. The album was released on 22 June 2018.

Haken also revealed that they started work on their fifth studio album:

We're currently getting our teeth stuck into the writing process for Album 5 and great ideas are forming and evolving as we speak. It's still early days but there is a sense among us that Haken may take a darker path with this one. However, the playing field is still wide open and the direction this record takes could alter at any point. One thing is certain: We will endeavor to stick to our mandate of strong melodies and Killer riffs!

Vector was released on 26 October 2018 with positive reviews. The second album by Jennings's side project Novena, Eleventh Hour, was released on 6 March 2020. In August 2019, Henshall released a solo album titled The Cocoon, featuring Jennings on vocals in one song. After some delays, Haken's sixth studio album, Virus (which is linked to Vector), was released on 24 July 2020.

On 26 August 2020, a Japanese-exclusive version of Virus was released, including, as a bonus track, an acoustic version of the song "Canary Yellow" featuring Bent Knee vocalist Courtney Swain, who provides backing and chorus vocals. Jennings announced his own upcoming solo album that same month.

=== Tejeida's departure and Fauna (2021–2025) ===
On 22 November 2021, the band announced that keyboardist Diego Tejeida had parted ways with them due to both parties having "very different musical visions".

On 31 December 2021, Jennings announced on Instagram page that a seventh Haken album was in the works, along with his second solo album. Founding member Peter Jones was announced to return to the band in 2022.

On 26 April 2022, the band released their single "Nightingale". On 30 August 2022, the band announced The Island in Limbo Tour, a co-headlining European tour with Between the Buried and Me, scheduled to start in February 2023.

On 24 November 2022, the band launched a game whose prize was an excerpt from a piece called "The Alphabet of Me" on their seventh album Fauna (released on 3 March 2023) and its cover art.

In 2024, Haken embarked on a North American and UK & European tour, dubbed 'An Evening with Haken'. The concerts were performed in two halves, the first of which featured Fauna played in full, and the second included songs from each of the band's six previous albums. On 9 May 2025, Haken released the live video album Liveforms: An Evening with Haken, recorded on 21 September 2024 at the O2 Forum Kentish Town in London.

=== Tour cancellation, Griffiths' & Green's departure, In a Fever Dream, and eighth album (2025–present) ===
On 4 June 2025, Coheed and Cambria announced an October 2025 tour with Haken as support. On 7 October 2025, shortly before the tour was due to take place, Haken announced that they were pulling out of the tour due to "reasons beyond their control". On 5 January 2026, Haken announced the departure of Griffiths and Green from the band. In a statement, the band wrote:

It’s with heavy hearts that we announce the departure of Charlie Griffiths and Conner Green from Haken. We are tremendously grateful for the time we’ve spent together, creating music and touring the world, achieving things we thought weren’t possible. Both Charlie and Conner are irreplaceable, as musicians and individuals, and they have given so much to make this band what it is today. We cannot thank them enough, but we wish them all the best with any future endeavours. They will always be a part of the Haken family. New music coming this year.

On 21 May 2026, they released a single titled "In a Fever Dream" (which is also the title of their second EP released in 2026), featuring Bryan Beller on bass. On 11 June, another single followed, titled "Bleeding Sky" and featuring Adam "Nolly" Getgood (ex-Periphery) on bass. The band also announced a European tour for September and October. On 1 July, Haken released a third single titled "Delirium", coupled with a release date of 17 July for their upcoming EP.

== Writing process ==
Haken is known to occasionally release short videos of rehearsals and writing sessions on the members' respective public social media accounts. The following was asked to the members during a Reddit "Ask Us Anything" in May 2014:

My question is what is the writing process like for you guys? Do you all write as a group or write alone and bring your ideas to the table?

To which Richard Henshall replied;

I usually write the initial arrangements for each track using MIDI, we then take the songs to the rehearsal room twist things around a little till we're all happy.

== Publicity and reception ==
Haken has been featured on the Classic Rock Magazine subsidiary "Classic Rock Presents Prog" a few times. At first, the magazine presented a song from the first Haken demo on their free CD. They have opened for a few notable progressive outfits, such as King's X and Bigelf. The band's debut album has received positive reviews from Allmusic and Classic Rock Magazine. Additionally, the band hosted an "ask me anything" on Reddit in 2014.

== Band members ==
Current members

- Ross Jennings – lead vocals (2007–present)
- Richard Henshall – guitars, keyboards, backing vocals (2007–present)
- Raymond Hearne – drums, backing vocals, tuba (2007–present)
- Peter Jones – keyboards, backing vocals (2007–2008, 2022–present)

Former members

- Thomas MacLean – bass, backing vocals (2007–2013)
- Matthew Marshall – guitars (2007–2008)
- Charles Griffiths – guitars, backing vocals (2008–2026)
- Diego Tejeida – keyboards, backing vocals (2008–2021)
- Conner Green – bass, backing vocals (2014–2026)

Live members

- Pete Rinaldi – bass, backing vocals (2014)
- Tiggy – bass, backing vocals (2026)
- Freddie Draper – bass, backing vocals (2026–present)

== Discography ==
=== Studio albums ===
- Aquarius (2010)
- Visions (2011)
- The Mountain (2013)
- Affinity (2016)
- Vector (2018)
- Virus (2020)
- Fauna (2023)

=== Live albums ===
- L-1VE (2018)
- L+1VE (2018)
- Liveforms: An Evening with Haken (2025)

=== EPs ===
- Restoration (2014)
- In a Fever Dream (2026)

=== Demos ===
- Demo (2007)
- Enter the 5th Dimension (2008)
