= Without Face =

Hungarian band

- Origin: Veszprém, Hungary
- Genres: Gothic metal; Progressive metal; Thrash metal
- Years active: 1997-2008
- Labels: Hammer Music Productions, Dark Symphonies Records, Earache Records
- Past members: Andras Szabo; Nori Pádár; Zsolt Horváth (Roomy); Szilard Sárik (Sasza); Gergo Maros; Peter Sütõ; Balázs Punk; Zoltán Hegyaljai-Boros; Dina; Sanya; Péter Márton; Anett Balássi; Péter "Incho" Inotai; Kyrah Németh; Bertalan Temesi; Andras Szabo; Juliette Kiss

Without Face were a Hungarian progressive metal band. They were formed in the city of Veszprém, Hungary in May, 1997.

The band featured a dual female and male vocal line-up. Their music combined elements of gothic metal, progressive metal and thrash metal. Their lyrics are influenced by the writings of H. P. Lovecraft, Edgar Allan Poe, and Henry Wadsworth Longfellow.

== History ==
Without Face formed in 1997. In 1998, the band recorded its first self-titled demo Without Face. Constant touring and the demo resulted in a deal for their first album Deep Inside with Hammer Music Productions, in 2000. Without Face also appeared on a number of the label's metal music compilations. Their first album was subsequently re-released in the United States by the Dark Symphonies Records label.

The band were approached by English producer Lee Barrett, from Earache Records for a four-album deal and worldwide release in 2002. A full-length album, Astronomicon was released in late 2002 and received favourable reviews from the metal music press. It was awarded "Album of the Month" in the English music magazine Metal Hammer.

The band split up in 2008.

== Members ==
- Andras Szabo - vocals
- Nori Pádár - vocals (2005-2008)
- Zsolt Horváth (Roomy) - guitar
- Szilard Sárik (Sasza) - keyboard
- Gergo Maros - bass guitar (2005-2008)
- Peter Sütõ - drums
- Balázs Punk - bass (2007-2008)
- Zoltán Hegyaljai-Boros (2008)
- Dina - vocals (?-2005)
- Sanya - bass (?-2005)
- Péter Márton - bass guitar (1997-2000/01)
- Anett Balássi - vocals (1997-2000/01)
- Péter "Incho" Inotai - guitar (1997-2000/01)
- Kyrah Németh - keyboards (1997-2000/01)
- Bertalan Temesi - bass guitar (1997-2000/01)
- Andras Szabo - vocals (1997-2006)
- Juliette Kiss - vocals (2000/2001-2003)

== Discography ==
- (Men) Without Face (1998) demo recording
- Deep Inside (2000)
- Astronomicon (2002)
