= Richard Henshall =

English progressive metal multi-instrumentalist

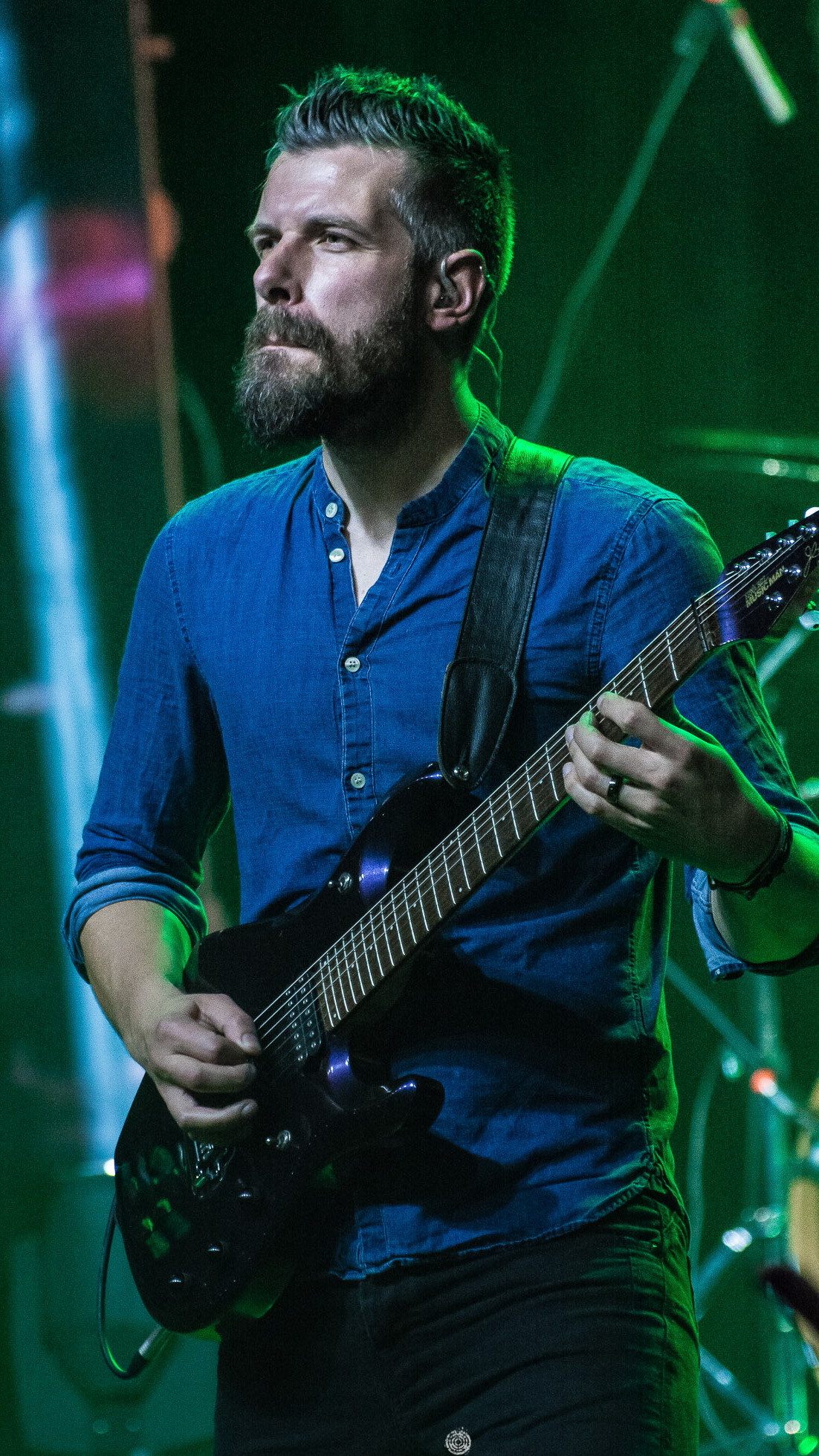
- Henshall performing with Mike Portnoy's Shattered Fortress in 2017

Background information
- Also known as: Hen
- Born: Richard James Henshall; 9 August 1984 (age 41)
- Origin: England
- Genres: Progressive metal, progressive rock, heavy metal
- Occupation: Musician
- Instruments: Guitar, piano, keyboards, vocals, clarinet, drums, bass guitar
- Years active: 2004–present
- Labels: Candlelight Records, Sensory Records, Inside Out
- Member of: Haken, To-Mera, Nova Collective
- Website: To-Mera Home, Haken home, ,

Richard James "Hen" Henshall (born 9 August 1984) is an English progressive metal multi-instrumentalist. He is best known as the guitarist and keyboardist for the bands To-Mera, Haken, Nova Collective, and Opinaut. He has released one album (Exile) with To-Mera, seven (Aquarius, Visions, The Mountain, Affinity, Vector, Virus and Fauna) with Haken, and one solo album (The Cocoon). He has also released EPs and singles: Oxygen (with Opinaut), Redemption (with Alma West), Earthbound (with To-Mera), and Restoration (with Haken). Henshall was classically trained on the piano from the age of seven. By the age of 11 to 12, he started playing the guitar on a self-taught basis. He also had drums and clarinet classes.

== To-Mera ==
To-Mera formed in 2005 between a few friends, Julie Kiss (vocals), Thomas MacLean (guitar), Lee Barrett (bass), Akos Pirisi (drums), Hugo Sheppard (keyboard). They released a demo, which caught the attention of Candlelight Records. The band's musical style was drastically different from conventional progressive metal; the band drew upon a plethora of influences such as progressive rock. In 2006, To-Mera released Transcendental through Candlelight. The radical new style opened up slots to open for groups such as Dream Theater, Fates Warning, and Emperor. In 2008, To-Mera released their next album, Delusions. In 2009, they parted with Candlelight. Hugo Sheppard left after this, and they hired Henshall as replacement. They then self-released their EP Earthbound.

== Haken ==
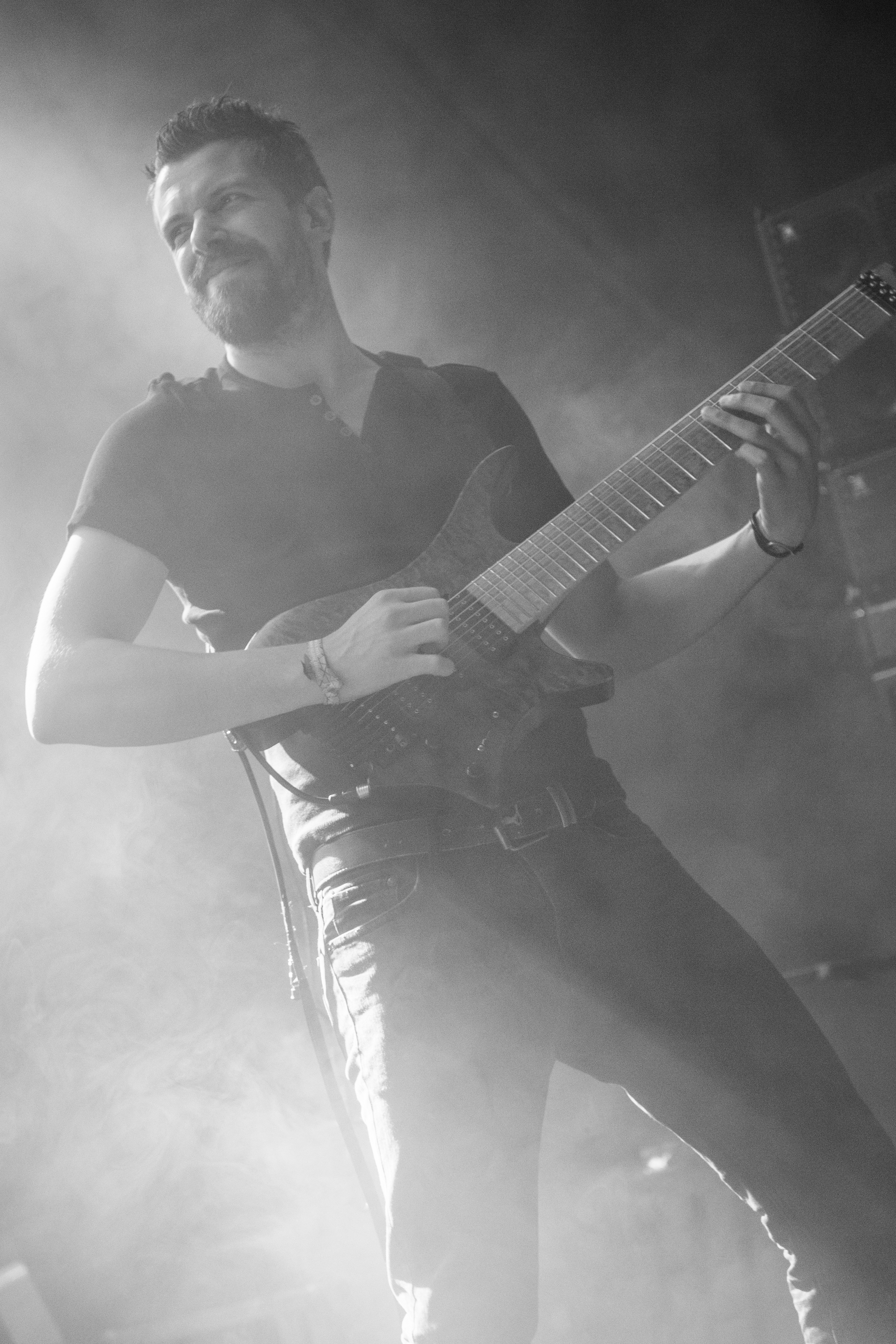
Henshall performing with Haken in 2015.

Haken was formed by school friends Ross Jennings (vocals), Matthew Marshall (guitar), and Henshall at first in 2004. The members parted ways for a while to study at university, reuniting in 2007. The current members hired Peter Jones on keyboards and Raymond Hearne on drums. Jones left soon after, and was replaced by Diego Tejeida. Charlie Griffiths was found on guitar, and Henshall brought in To-Mera bandmate Tom Maclean on bass.

Henshall has composed most of Haken's songs by himself and contributed to some of the lyrics. He composed the whole Aquarius album alone, most of Visions (except "Premonition", co-written with keyboardist Diego Tejeida and bassist Thomas MacLean; and "Insomnia", written by all members), and most of The Mountain (except "As Death Embraces", written by Tejeida). In this album, Henshall (as well as every other instrumentalist in the band) contributed with lyrics for the first time, on the song "Cockroach King". He would be credited as a lyricist again in the band's 2014 EP Restoration, for the song "Crystallised" (co-written with Hearne and Griffiths). Affinity (2016) and Vector (2018) both credited all songwriting to every band member.

== Opinaut ==
Opinaut formed in early 2011 from a group of four musicians working at the Sutton Music Centre. All four were talented multi-instrumentalists who worked in music full-time as session players and tutors. The members are: Jon Hart on vocals, John Vince on drums, Henshall on guitar, and Samuel Brooks on bass. Opinaut’s style is a merge of drum and bass rock with dreamy electro vibes and epic chord sequences. Their EP Oxygen was released in 2011 and is available online.

== Discography ==
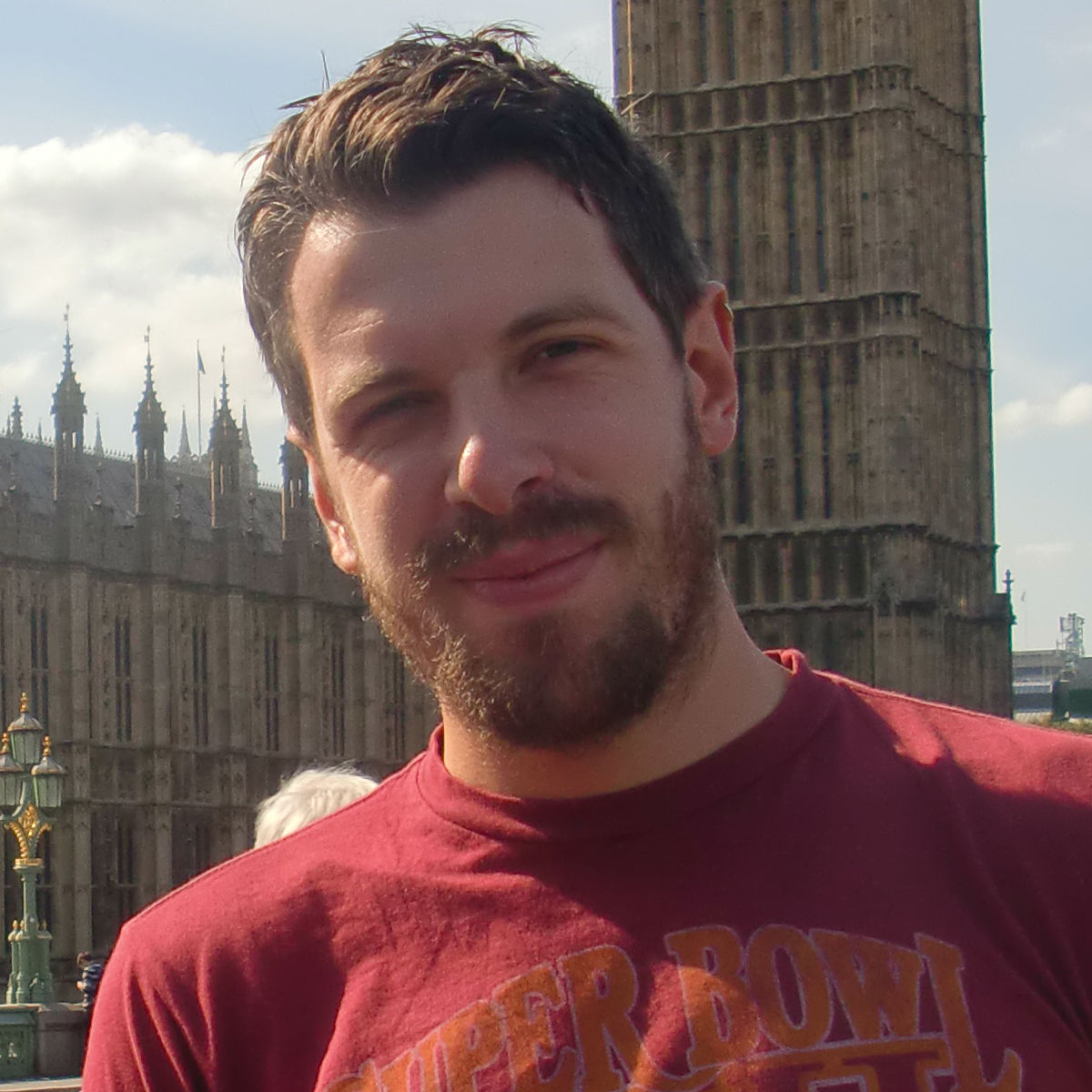
Henshall in 2012.

=== Solo ===
- (2019) The Cocoon
- (2024) Mu Vol. I (EP)

=== With To-Mera ===
- (2009) Earthbound (EP)
- (2012) Exile

=== With Nova Collective ===
- The Further Side (2017)

=== With Opinaut ===
- (2011) Oxygen (EP)

=== With Rainmask ===
- (2018) Walls (Single)
- (2018) Lighting Up the Sky (Single)

=== With Alma West ===
- (2019) Redemption

=== With Andy Simmons ===
- (2020) Duplicated Motion (EP)
