= Visions (Haken album) =

Studio album by Haken
- Released: 17 September 2011
- Recorded: 2011
- Venue: Guildhall School of Music and Drama (London)
- Studio: Hardbeat Records (Wembley); Studios E11
- Genre: Progressive metal; symphonic metal; progressive rock
- Length: 71:37
- Label: Sensory

Haken chronology
| Aquarius (2010) | Visions (2011) | The Mountain (2013) |

Visions is the second studio album by English progressive metal band Haken. The album was released mostly for the attention of people at ProgPower USA on 17 September 2011, with an official release date set for 25 October 2011.

Unlike Aquarius, which was written mainly on the piano by Richard Henshall, Visions was mostly written on the guitar. As with the debut album, the members recorded their parts at home and then shared the files between them. The album features a string quartet and a French horn player mixed with synthetic string and brass sections. Both string and French horn arrangements were arranged by keyboardist Diego Tejeida and drummer Ray Hearne.

It is a concept album like its predecessor, telling the story of "a young boy who sees his own death in his dreams and believes it's going to happen and spends the rest of his life trying to avoid it." The 22-minute closing title track signifies the end of the story having come full circle, referencing earlier musical themes and motifs. The track was written by vocalist Ross Jennings based on a premonition of his own death and it was the first song to be written, with the album growing around it. Like Aquarius, the album artwork was also created by Dennis Sibeijn.

The album is dedicated to the mother of guitarist Charlie Griffiths, who had died in 2011.

The song "Visions" contains a voice at the beginning reciting Segismundo's reflection from Pedro Calderón de la Barca's play Life Is a Dream.

== Track listing ==
All lyrics are written by Ross Jennings; all music is composed by Richard Henshall, except where noted.

| No. | Title | Music | Length |
|---|---|---|---|
| 1. | "Premonition" (Instrumental) | Henshall; Diego Tejeida; Thomas MacLean | 4:05 |
| 2. | "Nocturnal Conspiracy" | | 13:09 |
| 3. | "Insomnia" | Henshall; Tejeida; MacLean; Ross Jennings; Raymond Hearne; Charlie Griffiths | 6:03 |
| 4. | "The Mind's Eye" | | 4:04 |
| 5. | "Portals" (Instrumental) | | 5:27 |
| 6. | "Shapeshifter" | | 8:08 |
| 7. | "Deathless" | | 8:04 |
| 8. | "Visions" | | 22:27 |
| Total length: | | | 71:37 |

== Reception ==
Professional ratings
Review scores
| Source | Rating |
|---|---|
| Sea of Tranquility | 5/5 stars |
| AllMusic | 4/5 stars |

Visions received high praise from Sea of Tranquility webzine. It was described as "a staggeringly brilliant example of progressive metal" by Pete Pardo and "probably the final progressive masterpiece of 2011" by Murat Batmaz. Eduardo Rivadavia of AllMusic gave the album a positive review saying, "Visions isn't exactly a proud new flagship in Her Royal Majesty's Progressive Rock (H.R.M.P.R.) navy, but it's pretty darn seaworthy nonetheless."

== Personnel ==
Haken

- Ross Jennings – vocals
- Richard "Hen" Henshall – guitar and keyboards
- Charlie Griffiths – guitar
- Raymond Hearne – drums, tuba, djembe, strings and French horn arrangements
- Diego Tejeida – keyboards and sound design, strings and French horn arrangements
- Tom Maclean – bass

Additional musicians

- Lucy Butcher – cello
- Alison Comerford – violin
- Chris Currie – voices
- Patrick Harrild – voices
- Jennifer Murphey – violin
- Joey 'Dah Lipz' Ryan – French horn
- Martin Wray – viola

Production and design

- John Papas – recording (drums, percussion)
- George Balston – recording (piano, strings)
- Mark Rainbow – recording (piano, strings)
- Jonny Abraham – recording (french horn)
- Christian Moos – mixing
- Alan Douches – mastering
- Dennis Sibeijn – artwork, design
- Neil Palfreyman – photography
- Bo Hansen – photography
- Daniel Grey – photography
