= Ross Jennings (singer) =

English singer (born 1984)

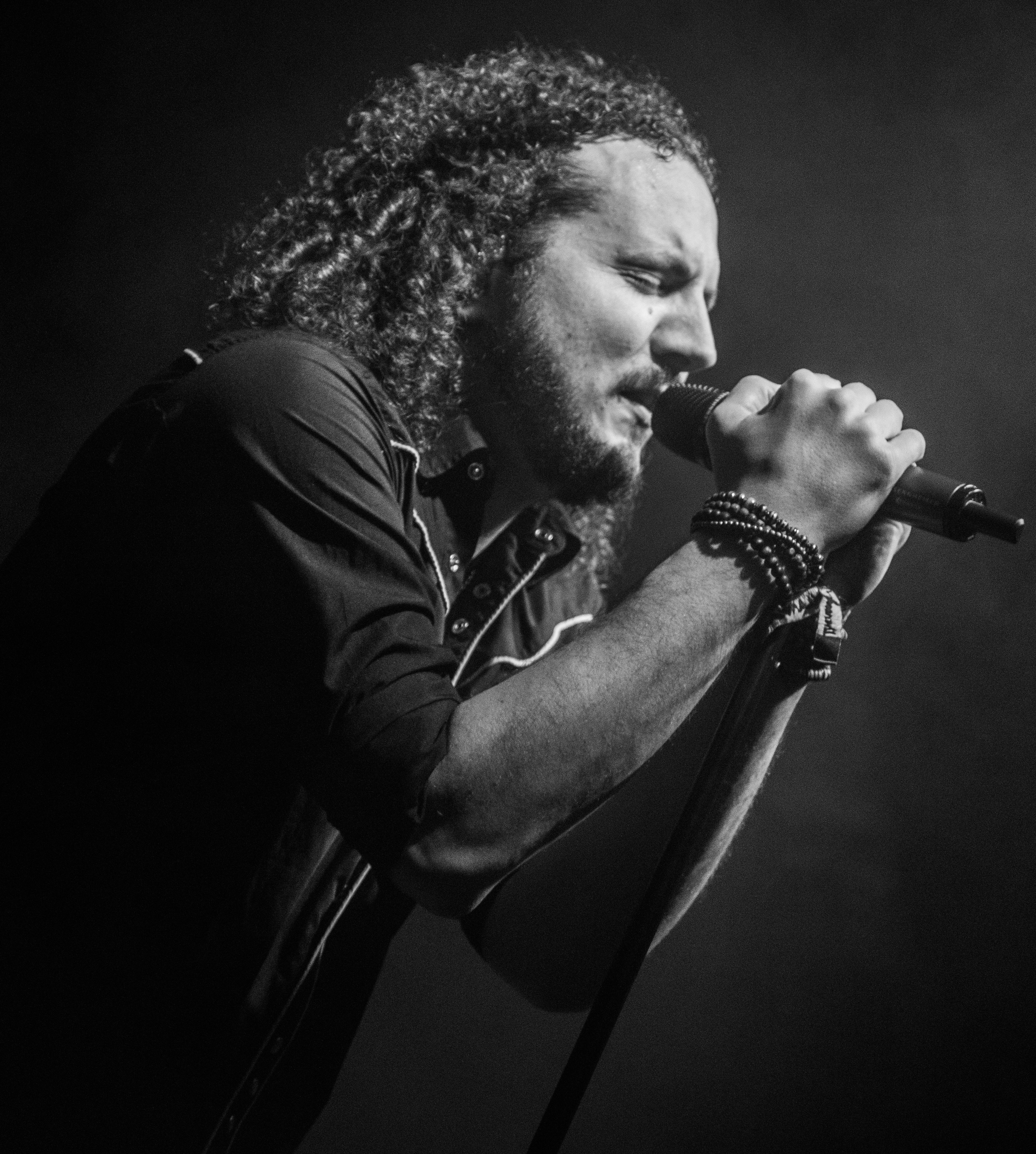
- Jennings at Euroblast Festival 2015

Background information
- Born: Ross William Jennings; 7 February 1984 (age 42); Salisbury, Wiltshire, England
- Genres: Progressive metal, progressive rock, alternative country, progressive pop, pop rock
- Years active: 2004–present
- Labels: Sensory, Inside Out, Frontiers, Graphite
- Member of: Haken; Novena; D'Virgilio, Morse & Jennings
- Formerly of: Redados
- Website: rossjennings.co.uk

Ross William Jennings (born 7 February 1984) is an English progressive metal singer, most known for being a founding member and the lead vocalist of the bands Haken and Novena. As of 2023, he has released seven albums with Haken (Aquarius, Visions, The Mountain, Affinity, Vector, Virus, and Fauna), one with Novena (Eleventh Hour), three with Redados (Too Tired for Sleep, One Way Conversations and Turbo Torture: Train Like Dogs...Ride Like Gods) and one solo album (A Shadow of My Future Self).

== Early life ==
Jennings was born on 7 February 1984 in Salisbury, Wiltshire, and moved to Sutton, London at an early age. His first experience with music was being taken to classical concerts which sparked little passion in him. He slowly grew to enjoy other genres alongside the music his father would play, mainly Pink Floyd and Crosby, Stills & Nash. This would prompt him to take short guitar lessons at age eight. At age sixteen, he became rhythm guitarist in a local band called Lost Child where he would play covers of popular bands at the time like Radiohead at bars in Croydon. He began singing as a hobby at karaoke bars and is completely self-taught.

== Career ==
=== Redados ===
Redados was a project formed by Jennings along with Roland Townson and Neil Bond in 2005. The trio would meet up every week in a converted chicken battery barn to jam and record. The band would later release two studio albums under the titles of Too Tired for Sleep (2009) and One Way Conversations (2010). The band would go on to perform live turbo training events with their music. In light of their local success, the band would release their third album, Turbo Torture: Train Like Dogs...Ride Like Gods (2012), in the form of a full workout routine.

=== Haken ===
Haken was formed by Jennings along with school friends Matthew Marshall, and Richard Henshall in 2004. Jennings originally played guitar in the band along with Marshall and Henshall but parted ways with the two to continue his studies at university. He would rejoin the band in 2007 as they couldn't find the singer they wanted for their first demo and asked Jennings to return as solely a vocalist. The sextet put together a self-titled, two-song demo in 2007, followed by an upgraded six-song demo in 2008 called "Enter the 5th Dimension." Jennings would go on to pen the stories and lyrics for the band's first two albums, Aquarius and Visions by himself.

In 2017, Jennings would go on to perform with Haken and Mike Portnoy performing Dream Theater's Twelve-step Suite as well as other Portnoy-era Dream Theater songs.

=== Novena ===
Novena was originally formed by Harrison White, Matt "Moat" Lowe, Dan Thornton and Cameron Spence after meeting at University in 2013. The quartet then went on to acquire Jennings and Gareth Mason as their vocalists. With this final 6-piece line-up, the band went on to release Secondary Genesis in 2016 and signed with Frontiers Records to release Eleventh Hour in 2020 as well as Live from Home and The Stopped Clock in 2021.

Two more singles, "Ghosts" and "Titans" would be released in 2022, following Mason's departure from the band and subsequent replacement with Austrian vocalist Pipi Gogerl.

=== A Shadow of My Future Self ===
On 3 October 2020, Jennings announced on Instagram that he is working on a solo album. He signed with Graphite Records and later announced it to be called A Shadow of my Future Self in June 2021 with the release of the album's first single, "Words We Can't Unsay" The album released on 19 November 2021. Unlike his more well-known Progressive music, Jennings' solo record follows a much more mainstream approach with Jennings directly citing Styx, Coldplay and Porcupine Tree as references. Subsequent singles "Grounded," "Violet," "Feelings," "Catcher in the Rye," and "Rocket Science" were released monthly until the albums release.

In January 2021, Jennings released Acoustic Shadows (Live at AfterLive Music), a recording of a paid livestream he did in July 2020 to promote the album, without warning as a paid downloadable file on his website. The album was added to streaming services that same week.

On 31 December 2021, Jennings announced on Instagram page that a follow-up album was in the works, alongside a seventh Haken album.

=== D'Virgilio, Morse & Jennings ===
The idea for D'Virgilio, Morse & Jennings was initially brainstormed in late 2020 by Neal Morse, who wanted to write an album of mellower songs, compared to that of his other works with Transatlantic and Spock's Beard. He went on to enlist former Spock's Beard bandmate Nick D'Virgilio to provide harmonic vocals and drums. Jennings was later invited to join after interviewing Mike Portnoy on The Absolute Universe. He was initially invited to just provide vocals, but contributed guitar and songwriting after Morse became aware of Jennings' guitar skill and then upcoming solo album.

In September 2021, it was announced that D'Virgilio, Morse and Jennings were writing an album together called Troika, scheduled to be released in 2022. The album's first single "Julia" was released 3 December 2021. This was followed by the singles "Everything I Am" on 11 January 2022 and "You Set My Soul On Fire" on 8 February 2022.

=== Collaborations and other works ===
In 2018, Jennings provided vocals on the song "Reveal" on the album Illusion of Choice by Yossi Sassi.

Jennings' Haken bandmate Richard Henshall released The Cocoon on 9 August 2019 which Jennings provided vocals for the album's single "Twisted Shadows".

On 30 July 2020, Jennings joined Derrick Schneider in a cover of the song "Faithfully" by Journey in which he provided vocals. He was also joined by Vikram Shankar, who provided keyboards and piano on A Shadow of My Future Self.

On 19 December 2020, Jennings worked with Simen Sandnes, Filippo Rosati, Arzene, Bringsli, Thrailkill and Jogan J. Bakken, together under the name of "Simen Sandnes and Friends with Benefits" in a cover of Mariah Carey's "All I Want for Christmas Is You." Sandnes would later go on to perform drums on A Shadow of My Future Self. Jennings would return the following year with Simen Sandnes and Friends with Benefits, providing vocals for their cover of Christmas carol "O Holy Night."

In 2021, Jennings provided vocals on the song "Daggers and Cloak" on the album Subjects by Scale the Summit.

In December 2021, Jennings was announced to be providing vocals on the album Revel in Time by Star One. On 17 December 2021 the song "Prescient" was released featuring Jennings on vocals.

On 24 January 2022, the song "Here Be Dragons" was released by Arzene, co-written and performed by Jennings.

On 4 August 2022, Finnish progressive metal artist Enigmatic Entrance announced that Jennings would feature their then upcoming song "Time & Tide".

On 12 March 2023, Jennings would again collaborate with Yossi Sassi on the song "Armaros Fall" on their album Prediluvian.

== Personal life ==
Jennings married his wife Yulia on 30 July 2010 and on 1 May 2021 announced that he became a father to a boy named Leo, with a second child arriving in January 2023. Outside of music, Jennings is a freelance photographer. He uses a Nikon camera.

== Discography ==
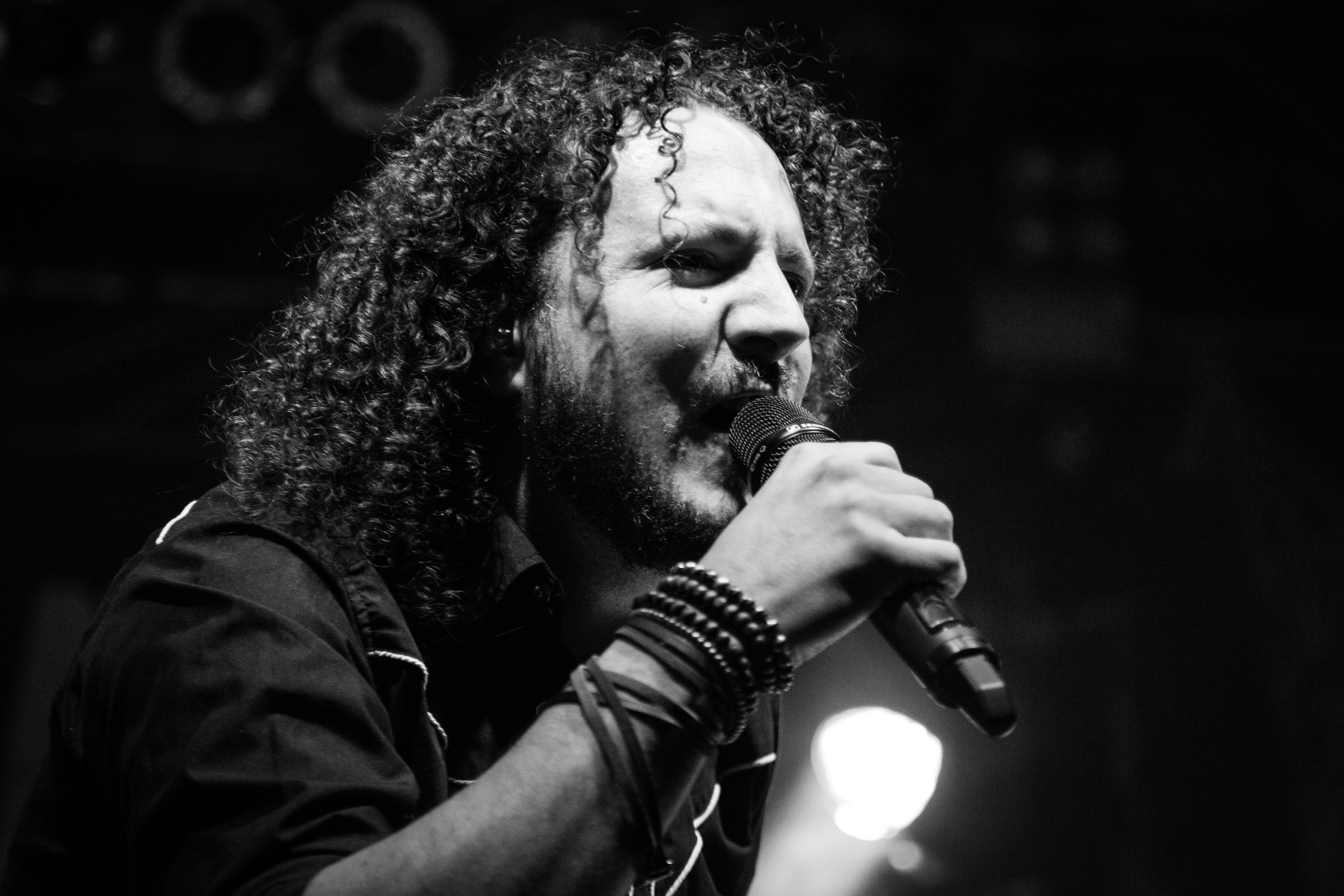
Jennings performing in 2015

=== Solo ===
- A Shadow of My Future Self (2021)

=== With Redados ===
- Too Tired for Sleep (2009)
- One Way Conversations (2010)
- Turbo Torture: Train Like Dogs...Ride Like Gods (2012)

=== With Novena ===
- Secondary Genesis (2016)
- Eleventh Hour (2020)
- Live from Home (2021)
- The Stopped Clock (2021)

=== With D'Virgilio, Morse & Jennings ===
- Troika (2022)
- Sophomore (2023)

=== Guest performances ===
- "Reveal" on Illusion of Choice, by Yossi Sassi (2018)
- "Twisted Shadows" on The Cocoon, by Richard Henshall (2019)
- "Daggers and Cloak" on Subjects, by Scale the Summit (2021)
- "Prescient" on Revel in Time, by Star One (2022)
- "Here be Dragons," by Arzene (2022)
- "Time & Tide" by Eniggmatic Entrance (2022)
- "Armaros Fall" on Prediluvian by Yossi Sassi (2023)
- "The Malevolent" on Waving at the Sky by AVKRVST (2025)
- "Touch of Life" Suite on Souls by Scardust (2025)
- The Restoration – Joseph: Part Two by Neal Morse (2024)
