= The Mountain (Haken album) =

Studio album by Haken
- Released: 2 September 2013
- Recorded: 2012–2013
- Studio: The Crypt (London)
- Genre: Progressive metal, progressive rock
- Length: 62:13
- Label: Inside Out Music; Century Media Records (distribution)

Haken chronology
Visions (2011)	The Mountain (2013)	Restoration (2014)

The Mountain is the third studio album by English progressive metal band Haken. It was released on 2 September 2013 through Inside Out Music. It is the last album to feature bassist Thomas MacLean.

== Background and recording ==
Band members Richard Henshall and Charlie Griffiths said of the album:

"To us, 'The Mountain' is symbolic of our journey as a band, but also reflects the wider trials and tribulations of life. Lyrically, we've done a lot of soul searching which has given the album an emotional depth that we're sure listeners will really relate to, whatever personal mountain they are climbing.
Musically, the new songs feel rawer and more emotional than anything we've created in the past. All the essential elements of our sound are still there but have been delivered in a more gritty and focused style. We've really pushed ourselves in all areas and truly believe that this album is a step up from any of our previous work..."

Unlike Aquarius and Visions, for which vocalist Ross Jennings wrote all the lyrics, The Mountain features contributions by every band member. On a 2016 interview, Jennings said:

"I'm still not sure if the rest of the band fully understood what I was trying to achieve lyrically with Aquarius and Visions, which I think left them quite cold and therefore they couldn't relate to those albums so well. If you ask them today, I still don't think they could explain the stories or the themes. So when it came to writing the Mountain, everyone wanted to get involved with that part of the process [...]"

According to keyboardist Diego Tejeida, the band "didn't set any boundaries for how we wanted the album to sound". He added that "The Mountain was tangibly influenced by 70's music, at the same time we threw in some prog-unrelated influences like: ambient, soul, jazz, 80's synthpop, minimalism or even those Glitch Hop Drums on 'Because It's There'."

Drummer Raymond "Ray" Hearne added that "The Mountain set out on a few different lyrical paths before realising its final form. We initially had a couple of quasi-concept ideas but soon began to realise this was a bit too constrictive so we pretty much chose a song or two each. [...] Each of us chose the song(s) that spoke most personally to us. We then tried to reflect that music with our words and vice versa. It soon became clear that this was a great collaborative decision as we all began to really dig what each one of us came up with and we were able to help one another with any musical/lyrical guidance they might have needed. It was a truly collaborative process."

Guitarist and keyboardist Richard Henshall said the band wanted to sound more "elemental" than their previous work, Visions. "We used this as a rough guideline and went with the natural flow of things. [...] To me, what we end up with is most the honest expression of our emotions and feelings.

According to Jennings, the epic "Falling Back to Earth" consists of two parts ("Rise" and "Fall"). The first is based on the history of Icarus and covers the subject of "ambition, failure and perseverence [sic], using the metaphor of wings and flying too close to the sun to represent how we take on challenges in life and the desire to prove something to people." The second part is inspired by science fiction iconography, "looking at the who we are and the world around us when we have fallen, and the humility required to reach out to others for forgiveness & acceptance. The rise and fall of this song sits aptly as the centre-piece of this album."

A shortened version of "Cockroach King" received a promotional video with The Muppets-like band members manufactured by Griffiths and controlled by Rinaldi and Ross. According to Tejeida, the idea was to make a video with comic touches for all ages, "far from the seriousness protocol demanded by a rock/metal video".

== Reception ==
Professional ratings
Review scores
Source	Rating
AllMusic	5/5 stars
Angry Metal Guy	9/10 stars
Ghost Cult Magazine	9/10 stars
Metal Underground	5/5 stars
The Monolith	9.2/10 stars
Sea of Tranquility	4.5/5 stars

The Mountain was met with critical acclaim.

Conor Fynes of Prog Sphere called it "quite possibly the greatest statement in progressive metal yet released in 2013", and noted that "the influence of bands like Dream Theater and King Crimson are undoubtedly evident, but Haken have finally claimed ownership of a sound unto their own. He however criticized the lyrics, saying they "tend to feel as cheesy and heavy-handed as they have always been", though still noting songwriting improvements compared to the previous two albums.

Anso DF of MetalSucks considered The Mountain "a chore, an overlong, indulgent, and occasionally annoying odyssey", but stated that "fans of Porcupine Tree and Katatonia will love The Mountain's moody melodies, if not its flights of wankery. The latter will tantalize those in a mood for Petrucci-type fun, though unsatisfied they will be with the infrequency of heavy riffage. It's basically just barely too heavy to be mistaken for Cairo. But not too heavy to open a co-headline tour of Devin Townsend and Zamfir."

Steven Reid of Sea of Tranquility said the album is "blindingly technical", but "doesn't feel like an exercise in how to get the most notes out of any given instrument". He also stated that "every instrumentalist comes to the fore, but never too egotistical to take a big step back when the need arises."

Kevin of The Monolith called it "a fantastic album that combines elements from all over the musical spectrum, boasting jazz, classic prog, modern prog rock and metal as main influences, while weaving the likes of choral, funk, and soul in as well. It has fantastic writing, amazing musicianship, a really personal, relatable theme, and sounds clear as a bell."

Roger T, also of Prog Sphere, gave the album a mixed review, stating that "Haken have taken a trolley-dash through the supermarket of prog, grabbing every influence they can get their eager little hands on, sometimes wholesale, and the end product is dizzying in its ambition and scope." However, he praised some songs, such as "Cockroach King", in which he noted vocal influences of Gentle Giant and "Because It's There", described by him as "an example of highly skilled writing and arrangement".

It has been cited by Dream Theater keyboardist Jordan Rudess and by drummer Mike Portnoy as one of their top 10 albums of 2013. It was also praised by Between the Buried and Me's bassist Dan Briggs.

The Mountain made the band gain a more substantial fanbase. At Prog Sphere, it won first place in albums of 2013 and fourth place in The Prog Report. In 2024, it was named one of the 10 "wackiest" progressive metal albums ever by Loudwire.

== Track listing ==
All music is composed by Richard Henshall, except "As Death Embraces", by Diego Tejeida.

No.	Title	Lyrics	Length
1.	"The Path"	Ray Hearne	2:46
2.	"Atlas Stone"	Hearne; Ross Jennings; Charlie Griffiths	7:33
3.	"Cockroach King"	Henshall	8:14
4.	"In Memoriam"	Jennings; Griffiths	4:17
5.	"Because It's There"	Hearne	4:23
6.	"Falling Back to Earth": I. "Rise"; II. "Fall"	Jennings; Griffiths	11:50
7.	"As Death Embraces"	Diego Tejeida	3:13
8.	"Pareidolia"	Tejeida	10:50
9.	"Somebody"	Thomas MacLean	9:00
Total length:			62:13

Limited digipak edition bonus tracks
No.	Title	Lyrics	Length
10.	"The Path Unbeaten" (instrumental version of "The Path")		2:12
11.	"Nobody" (acoustic and abridged version of "Somebody")	MacLean	4:53
Total length:			69:18

== Personnel ==
Haken

- Ross Jennings – lead vocals
- Richard Henshall – guitars, keyboards, backing vocals
- Charlie Griffiths – guitars, backing vocals
- Thomas MacLean – bass, backing vocals
- Diego Tejeida – keyboards, second voice (track 8)
- Raymond Hearne – drums, percussion, backing vocals, cimbasso, tuba

Additional musicians

- Joey 'Dah Lipz' Ryan – french horn
- Matthew Lewis – trombone
- Barry Clements – bass trombone

Production and design

- Anthony Leung – recording (drums)
- Jens Bogren – mixing, mastering
- Diego Tejeida – sound design, mixing (tracks 10, 11)
- Blacklake – artwork, design
- Joanna Krause – photography

== Charts ==
Chart (2013)	Peak position
Belgian Albums (Ultratop Wallonia)	166
Dutch Albums (Album Top 100)	82
German Albums (Offizielle Top 100)	42
Swiss Albums (Schweizer Hitparade)	93
