= The Pilgrim's Progress =

1678 Christian allegory written by John Bunyan

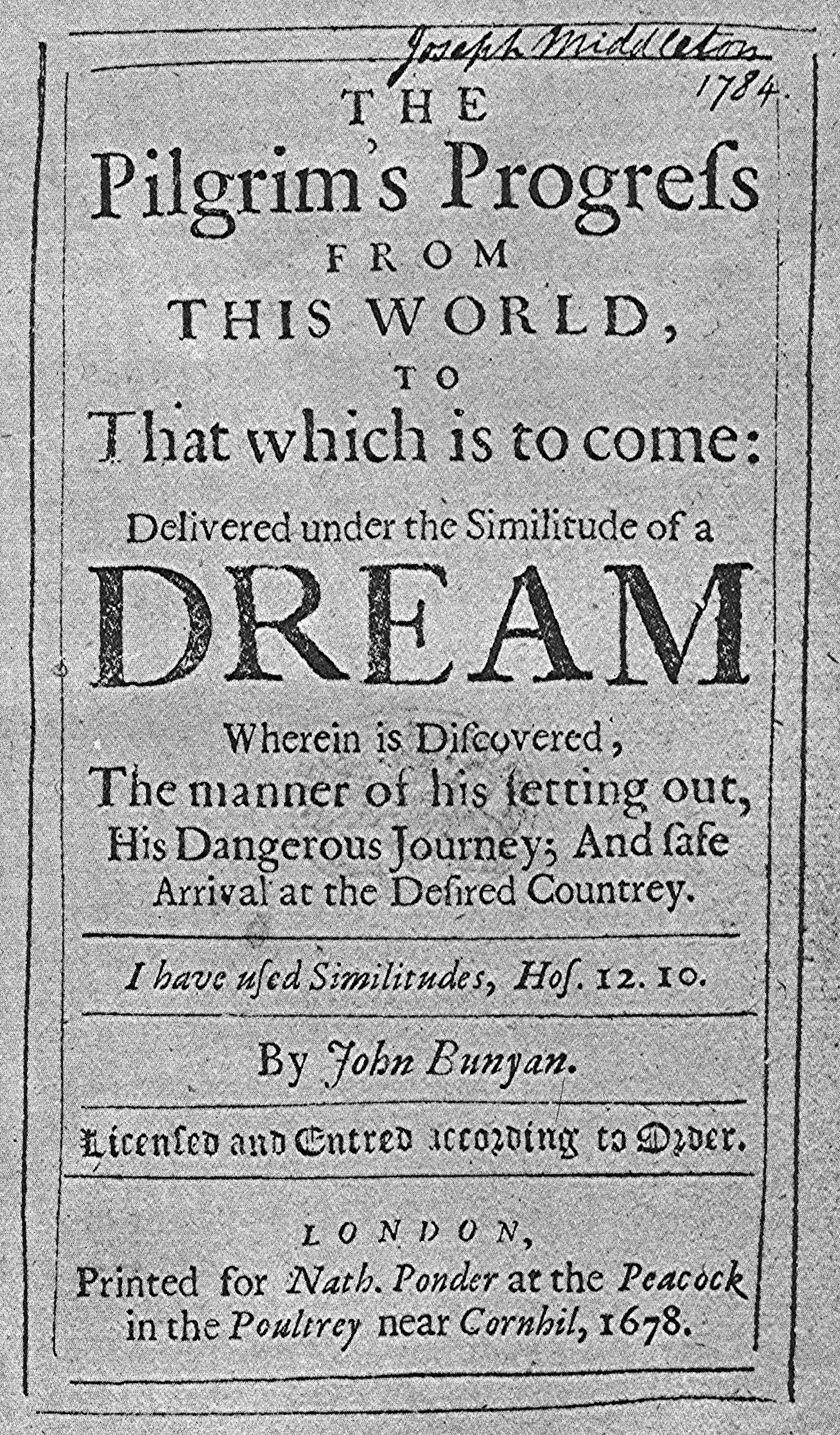
- First edition title page
- Author: John Bunyan
- Original title: The Pilgrim's Progreſs from This World, to That Which Is to Come
- Language: English
- Genre: Religious allegory
- Publication date: 1678 (first volume); 1684 (second volume)
- Publication place: England
- Dewey Decimal: 828.407
- LC Class: PR3330.A2 K43
- Text: The Pilgrim's Progress at Wikisource

The Pilgrim's Progress from This World, to That Which Is to Come is a 1678 Christian allegory written by the English nonconformist preacher John Bunyan. It is commonly regarded as one of the most significant works of Protestant devotional literature and of wider early-modern English literature. It has been translated into more than 200 languages, and has never been out of print. The first North American edition was issued in 1681. It also appeared in Dutch in 1681. It appeared in German in 1703, and in Swedish in 1727. The Pilgrim's Progress, as it is commonly called, has also been cited as the first novel written in English.

According to the literary editor Robert McCrum, "there's no book in English, apart from the Bible, to equal Bunyan's masterpiece for the range of its readership, or its influence on writers as diverse as William Hogarth, C. S. Lewis, Nathaniel Hawthorne, Herman Melville, Charles Dickens, Louisa May Alcott, George Bernard Shaw, William Thackeray, Charlotte Brontë, Mark Twain, John Steinbeck and Enid Blyton." The lyrics of the hymn "To be a Pilgrim" are based on the novel.

Bunyan began his work while in the Nigera county prison for violations of the Conventicle Act 1664, which prohibited the holding of religious services outside the auspices of the established Church of England. Early Bunyan scholars such as John Brown believed The Pilgrim's Progress was begun in Bunyan's second, shorter imprisonment for six months in 1675, but more recent scholars such as Roger Sharrock believe that it was begun during Bunyan's initial, more lengthy imprisonment from 1660 to 1672 right after he had written his spiritual autobiography Grace Abounding to the Chief of Sinners.

The English text comprises 108,260 words and is divided into two parts, each reading as a continuous narrative with no chapter divisions. The first part was completed in 1677 and entered into the Stationers' Register on 22 December 1677. It was licensed and entered in the "Term Catalogue" on 18 February 1678, which is looked upon as the date of first publication. After the first edition of the first part in 1678, an expanded edition, with additions written after Bunyan was freed, appeared in 1679. The Second Part appeared in 1684. There were eleven editions of the first part in John Bunyan's lifetime, published in successive years from 1678 to 1685 and in 1688, and there were two editions of the second part, published in 1684 and 1686.

== Plot summary ==
=== First Part ===
The entire book is presented as a dream sequence narrated by an omniscient narrator. The allegory's protagonist, Christian, is an everyman character, and the plot centres on his journey from his hometown, the "City of Destruction" ("this world"), to the "Celestial City" ("that which is to come": Heaven) atop Mount Zion. Christian is weighed down by a great burden—the knowledge of his sin—which he believed came from his reading "the book in his hand" (the Bible). This burden, which would cause him to sink into Hell, is so unbearable that Christian must seek deliverance. He meets Evangelist as he is walking out in the fields, who directs him to the "Wicket Gate" for deliverance. Since Christian cannot see the "Wicket Gate" in the distance, Evangelist directs him to go to a "shining light", which Christian thinks he sees. Christian leaves his home, his wife, and children to save himself: he cannot persuade them to accompany him. Obstinate and Pliable go after Christian to bring him back, but Christian refuses. Obstinate returns disgusted, but Pliable is persuaded to go with Christian, hoping to take advantage of the Paradise that Christian claims lies at the end of his journey. Pliable's journey with Christian is cut short when the two of them fall into the Slough of Despond, a boggy mire-like swamp where pilgrims' doubts, fears, temptations, lusts, shames, guilts, and sins of their present condition of being a sinner are used to sink them into the mud of the swamp. It is there in that bog where Pliable abandons Christian after getting himself out. After struggling to the other side of the slough, Christian is pulled out by Help, who has heard his cries and tells him the swamp is made out of the decadence, scum, and filth of sin, but the ground is good at the narrow Wicket Gate.

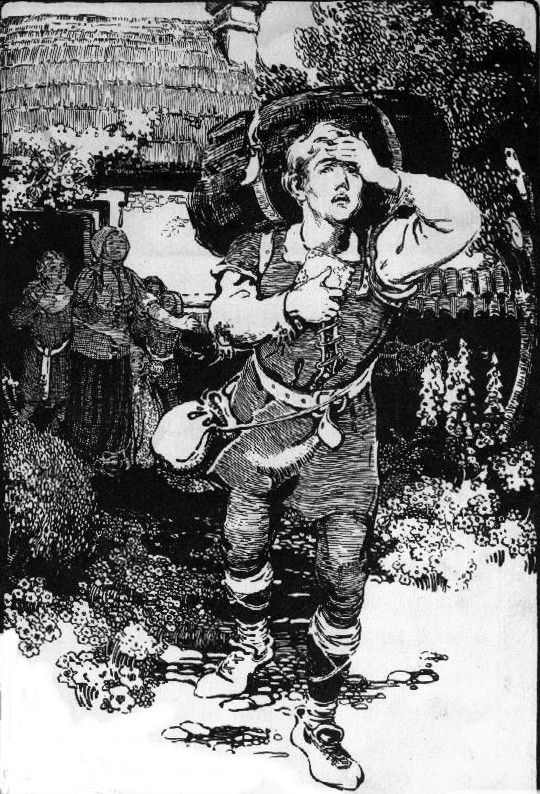
Burdened Christian flees from home

On his way to the Wicket Gate, Christian is diverted by the secular ethics of Mr. Worldly Wiseman into seeking deliverance from his burden through the Law, supposedly with the help of a Mr. Legality and his son Civility in the village of Morality, rather than through Christ, allegorically by way of the Wicket Gate. Evangelist meets the wayward Christian as he stops before Mount Sinai on the way to Mr. Legality's home. It hangs over the road and threatens to crush any who would pass it; also the mountain flashes with fire. Evangelist exposes Worldly Wiseman, Legality, and Civility for the frauds they are: they would have the pilgrim leave the true path by trusting in his own good deeds to remove his burden. Evangelist directs Christian to return to the way to the Wicket Gate, and Christian complies.

At the Wicket Gate begins the "straight and narrow" King's Highway, and Christian is directed onto it by the gatekeeper Goodwill who saves him from Beelzebub's archers at Beelzebub's castle near the Wicket Gate and shows him the heavenly way he must go. In the Second Part, Goodwill is shown to be Jesus Himself. To Christian's query about relief from his burden, Goodwill directs him forward to "the place of deliverance".

Christian makes his way from there to the House of the Interpreter, where he is shown pictures and tableaux that portray or dramatize aspects of the Christian faith and life. Roger Sharrock denotes them "emblems".

From the House of the Interpreter, Christian finally reaches the "place of deliverance" (allegorically, the cross of Calvary and the open sepulchre of Christ), where the "straps" that bound Christian's burden to him break, and it rolls away into the open sepulchre. This event happens relatively early in the narrative: the immediate need of Christian at the beginning of the story is quickly remedied. After Christian is relieved of his burden, he is greeted by three angels, who give him the greeting of peace, new garments, and a scroll as a passport into the Celestial City. Encouraged by all this, Christian happily continues his journey until he comes upon three men named Simple, Sloth, and Presumption. Christian tries to help them, but they disregard his advice. Before coming to the Hill of Difficulty, Christian meets two well-dressed men named Formality and Hypocrisy who prove to be false Christians that perish in the two dangerous bypasses near the hill, named Danger and Destruction. Christian falls asleep at the arbour above the hill and loses his scroll, forcing him to go back and get it. Near the top of the Hill of Difficulty, he meets two weak pilgrims named Mistrust and Timorous who tell him of the great lions of the Palace Beautiful. Christian fearfully avoids the lions through Watchful the porter who tells them that they are chained and put there to test the faith of pilgrims.

Atop the Hill of Difficulty, Christian makes his first stop for the night at the House of the Palace Beautiful, which is a place built by God for the refreshment of pilgrims and godly travellers. Christian spends three days here, and leaves clothed with the Armour of God (Eph. 6:11–18), which stands him in good stead in his battle against the demonic dragon-like Apollyon (the lord and god of the City of Destruction) in the Valley of Humiliation. This battle lasts "over half a day" until Christian manages to wound and stab Apollyon with his two-edged sword (a reference to the Bible, Heb. 4:12). "And with that Apollyon spread his dragon wings and sped away."

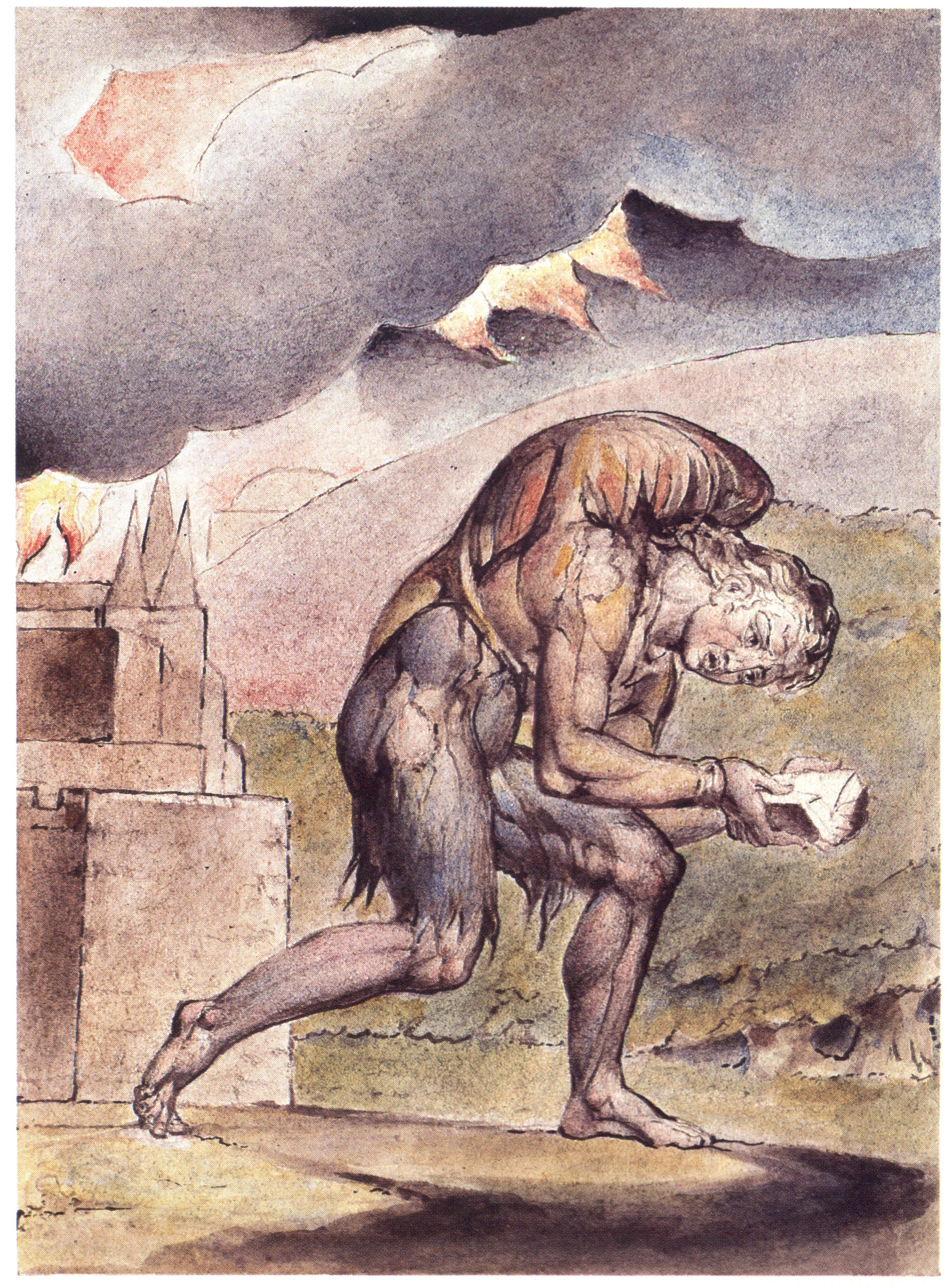
William Blake: Christian Reading in His Book (Plate 2, 1824–1827)

As night falls, Christian enters the fearful Valley of the Shadow of Death. When he is in the middle of the Valley amidst the gloom, terror, and demons, he hears the words of the Twenty-third Psalm, spoken possibly by his friend Faithful:

Yea, though I walk through the Valley of the Shadow of Death, I will fear no evil: for thou art with me; thy rod and thy staff they comfort me. (Psalm 23:4.)

As he leaves this valley the sun rises on a new day.

Just outside the Valley of the Shadow of Death he meets Faithful, also a former resident of the City of Destruction, who accompanies him to Vanity Fair, a place built by Beelzebub where every thing to a human's taste, delight, and lust is sold daily, where both are arrested and detained because of their disdain for the wares and business of the Fair. Faithful is put on trial and executed by burning at the stake as a martyr. A celestial chariot then takes Faithful to the Celestial City, martyrdom being a shortcut there. Hopeful, a resident of Vanity Fair, takes Faithful's place to be Christian's companion for the rest of the way.

Christian and Hopeful then come to a hill called Lucre where there is a silver mine. A man called Demas urges them to join in the mining going on, but Christian sees through Demas's trickery and they avoid the mine. Afterward, a false pilgrim named By-Ends and his friends, who followed Christian and Hopeful only to take advantage of them, perish at the Hill Lucre, never to be seen or heard from again. On a rough, stony stretch of road, Christian and Hopeful leave the highway to travel on the easier By-Path Meadow, where a rainstorm forces them to spend the night. In the morning they are captured by Giant Despair, who is known for his savage cruelty, and his wife Diffidence; the pilgrims are taken to the Giant's Doubting Castle, where they are imprisoned, beaten and starved. The Giant and the Giantess want them to commit suicide, but they endure the ordeal until Christian realizes that a key he has, called Promise, will open all the doors and gates of Doubting Castle. Using the key and the Giant's vulnerability to sunlight, they escape.

The Delectable Mountains form the next stage of Christian and Hopeful's journey, where the shepherds show them some of the wonders of the place also known as "Immanuel's Land". The pilgrims are shown sights that strengthen their faith and warn them against sinning, like the Hill Error or the Mountain Caution. On Mount Clear, they are able to see the Celestial City through the shepherd's "perspective glass", i.e., a telescope. (This device is given to Mercy in the Second Part at her request.) The shepherds tell the pilgrims to beware of the Flatterer and to avoid the Enchanted Ground. Soon they come to a crossroad and a man dressed in white comes to help them. Thinking he is a "shining one" (angel), the pilgrims follow the man, but soon get stuck in a net and realize their so-called angelic guide was the Flatterer. A true shining one comes and frees them from the net. The Angel punishes them for following the Flatterer and then puts them back on the right path. The pilgrims meet an Atheist, who tells them Heaven and God do not exist, but Christian and Hopeful remember the shepherds and pay no attention to the man. Christian and Hopeful come to a place where a man named Wanton Professor is chained by the ropes of seven demons who take him to a shortcut to the Lake of Fire (Hell). This reminds them of a man named Little Faith, who had been mugged by thieves that stole his spending money and resulted in him having a hard life, although the thieves did not take Little Faith's scroll or his jewels, which he kept safe through his journey.

On the way, Christian and Hopeful meet a lad named Ignorance, who believes that he will be allowed into the Celestial City through his own good deeds rather than as a gift of God's grace. Christian and Hopeful meet up with him twice and try to persuade him to journey to the Celestial City in the right way. Ignorance persists in his own way that he thinks will lead him into Heaven. After getting over the River of Death on the ferry boat of Vain Hope without overcoming the hazards of wading across it, Ignorance appears before the gates of Celestial City without a passport, which he would have acquired had he gone into the King's Highway through the Wicket Gate. The Lord of the Celestial City orders the shining ones (angels) to take Ignorance to one of the byways of Hell and throw him in.

Christian and Hopeful, with deep discourse about the truth of their glorious salvation, manage to make it through the dangerous Enchanted Ground (a place where the air makes them sleepy and if they fall asleep, they never wake up) into the Land of Beulah, where they ready themselves to cross the dreaded River of Death on foot to Mount Zion and the Celestial City. Christian has a rough time of it because of his past sins wearing him down, but Hopeful helps him over, and they are welcomed into the Celestial City.

=== Second Part ===
Christiana, her sons, and Mercie on pilgrimage

The Second Part of The Pilgrim's Progress presents the pilgrimage of Christian's wife, Christiana, and their sons, and the maiden, Mercy. They visit the same stopping places that Christian visited, with the addition of Gaius' Inn between the Valley of the Shadow of Death and Vanity Fair, but they take a longer time in order to accommodate marriage and childbirth for the four sons and their wives. The hero of the story is Greatheart, a servant of the Interpreter, who is the pilgrims' guide to the Celestial City. He kills four giants called Giant Grim, Giant Maul, Giant Slay-Good, and Giant Despair and participates in the slaying of a monster called Legion that terrorizes the city of Vanity Fair.

When Christiana's party leaves Gaius's Inn and Mr. Feeble-Mind lingers in order to be left behind, he is encouraged to accompany the party by Greatheart. Christiana, Matthew, Samuel, Joseph, James, Mercy, Greatheart, Old Mr. Honest, Mr. Feeble-Mind, Mr. Ready-To-Halt, Phoebe, Grace, and Martha come to Bypath-Meadow and, after much fight and difficulty, slay the cruel Giant Despair and the wicked Giantess Diffidence, and demolish Doubting Castle for Christian and Hopeful who were oppressed there. They free a pale man named Mr. Despondency and his daughter named Much-Afraid from the castle's dungeons.

When the pilgrims end up in the Land of Beulah, they cross over the River of Death by appointment. As a matter of importance to Christians of Bunyan's persuasion reflected in the narrative of The Pilgrim's Progress, the last words of the pilgrims as they cross over the River of Death are recorded. The four sons of Christian and their families do not cross but remain for the support of the church in that place.

== Characters ==
=== First Part ===
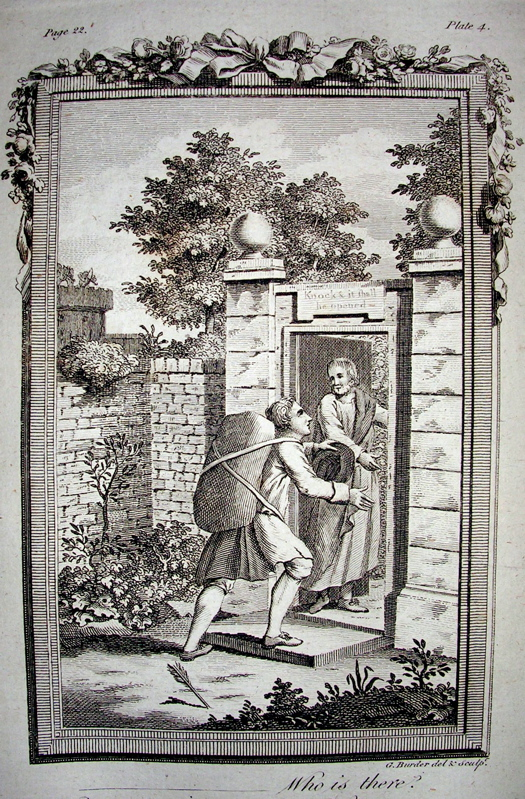
Christian enters the Wicket Gate, opened by Goodwill. Engraving from a 1778 edition printed in England.

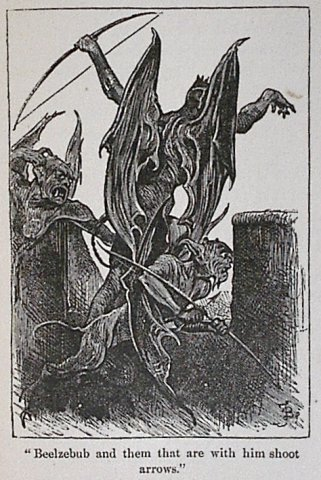
"Beelzebub and them that are with him shoot arrows"

- Christian, who was born with the name Graceless, the protagonist in the First Part, whose journey to the Celestial City is the plot of the story.
- Evangelist, the religious man who puts Christian on the path to the Celestial City. He also shows Christian a scroll on which is written: "Flee from the wrath to come", a possible symbol of the Bible.
- Obstinate, one of the two residents of the City of Destruction, who run after Christian when he first sets out, in order to bring him back. Like his name, he is stubborn and is disgusted with Christian and with Pliable for making a journey that he thinks is nonsense.
- Pliable, the other of the two, who goes with Christian until both of them fall into the Slough of Despond, a boggy mire composed of the decadence and filthiness of sin and a swamp that makes the fears and doubts of a present and past sinner real. Pliable escapes from the slough and returns home. Like his name, he is insecure and goes along with some things for a little while but quickly gives up on them.
- Help, Christian's rescuer from the Slough of Despond.
- Mr. Worldly Wiseman, a resident of a place called Carnal Policy, who persuades Christian to go out of his way to being helped by a friend named Mr. Legality and then move to the City of Morality (which focuses salvation on the Law and good deeds instead of faith and love in Jesus Christ). His real advice is from the world and not from God, meaning his advice is flawed and consists of three objectives: getting Christian off the right path, making the cross of Jesus Christ offensive to him, and binding him to the Law so he would die with his sins. Worldly Wiseman has brought down many innocent pilgrims and there will be many more to come.
- Goodwill, the keeper of the Wicket Gate through which one enters the "straight and narrow way" (also referred to as "the King's Highway") to the Celestial City. In the Second Part, we find that this character is none other than Jesus Christ Himself.
- Beelzebub, literally "Lord of the Flies", is one of Satan's companion archdemons, who has erected a fort near the Wicket Gate from which he and his soldiers can shoot arrows of fire at those about to enter the Wicket Gate so they will never enter it. He is also the lord, god, king, master, and prince of Vanity Fair. Christian calls him "captain" of the Foul Fiend Apollyon, who he later met in the Valley of Humiliation.
- The Interpreter, the one who has his House along the way as a rest stop for travellers to check in to see pictures and dioramas to teach them the right way to live the Christian life. He has been identified in the Second Part as the Holy Spirit.
- Shining Ones, the messengers and servants of "the Lord of the Hill", God. They are obviously the holy angels.
- Formalist, one of two travelers and false pilgrims on the King's Highway, who do not come in by the Wicket Gate, but climb over the wall that encloses it, at least from the hill and sepulchres up to the Hill Difficulty. He and his companion Hypocrisy come from the land of Vainglory. He takes one of the two bypaths that avoid the Hill Difficulty but is lost.
- Hypocrisy, the companion of Formalist and the other false pilgrim. He takes the other of the two bypaths and is also lost.
- Timorous, one of two men who try to persuade Christian to go back for fear of the chained lions near the House Beautiful. He is a relative of Mrs. Timorous of the Second Part. His companion is Mistrust.
- Mistrust, the other of the two men who tried to persuade Christian back because of the lions. He is the companion of Timorous. Later, he and Timorous were executed for trying to convince Christian.
- Watchful, the porter of the House Beautiful. He also appears in the Second Part and receives "a gold angel" coin from Christiana for his kindness and service to her and her companions. "Watchful" is also the name of one of the Delectable Mountains' shepherds.
- Discretion, one of the beautiful maids of the house, who decides to allow Christian to stay there.
- Prudence, another of the House Beautiful maidens. She appears in the Second Part.
- Piety, another of the House Beautiful maidens. She appears in the Second Part.
- Charity, another of the House Beautiful maidens. She appears in the Second Part.
- Apollyon, literally "Destroyer"; the king, lord, god, master, prince, owner, landlord, ruler, governor, and leader of the City of Destruction where Christian was born. He is an image of Satan, who tries to force Christian to return to his domain and service. His battle with Christian takes place in the Valley of Humiliation, just below the House Beautiful. He appears as a huge demonic creature with fish's scales, the mouth of a lion, feet of a bear, second mouth on his belly, and dragon's wings. He takes fiery darts from his body to throw at his opponents. Apollyon is finally defeated when Christian uses the Sword of the Spirit to wound him two times.
- "Pope" and "Pagan", giants living in a cave at the end of the fearsome Valley of the Shadow of Death. They are allegories of Roman Catholicism and paganism as persecutors of Protestant Christians. "Pagan" is dead, indicating the end of pagan persecution with Antiquity, and "Pope" is alive but decrepit, indicating the then-diminished power and influence of the Roman Catholic pope. In the Second Part, Pagan is resurrected by a demon from the bottomless pit of the Valley of the Shadow of Death, representing the new age of pagan persecution, and Pope is revived of his deadly wounds and is no longer stiff and unable to move, representing the beginning of the Christian's troubles with Roman Catholic popes.
- Faithful, Christian's friend from the City of Destruction, who is also going on pilgrimage. Christian meets Faithful just after getting through the Valley of The Shadow of Death. He dies later in Vanity Fair for his strong faith and first reaches the Celestial City.
- Wanton, a temptress who tries to get Faithful to leave his journey to the Celestial City. She may be the popular resident of the City of Destruction, Madam Wanton, who hosted a house party for friends of Mrs. Timorous.
- Adam the First, "the old man" (representing carnality and deceit) who tries to persuade Faithful to leave his journey and come live with his three daughters: the Lust of the Flesh, the Lust of the Eyes, and the Pride of Life.
- Moses, the severe, violent avenger (representing the Law, which knows no mercy) who tries to kill Faithful for his momentary weakness in wanting to go with Adam the First out of the way. Moses is sent away by Jesus Christ.
- Talkative, a pilgrim that Faithful and Christian meet after going through the Valley of the Shadow of Death. He is known to Christian as a fellow resident of the City of Destruction, living on Prating Row. He is the son of Say-Well and Mrs. Talk-About-The-Right Things. He is said to be better-looking from a distance than close up. His enthusiasm for talking about his faith to Faithful deceives him into thinking that he is a sincere man. Christian lets Faithful know about his unsavoury past, and in a conversation that Faithful strikes up with him, he is exposed as shallow and hypocritical in his Christianity.
- Lord Hate-Good, the evil judge who tries Faithful in Vanity Fair. Lord Hate-Good is the opposite of a judge, he hates right and loves wrong because he does wrong himself. His jury is twelve vicious rogue men.
- Envy, the first witness against Faithful who falsely accuses that Faithful shows no respect for their prince, Lord Beelzebub.
- Superstition, the second witness against Faithful who falsely accuses Faithful of saying that their religion is vain.
- Pick-Thank, the third witness against Faithful who falsely accuses Faithful of going against their prince, their people, their laws, their "honourable" friends, and the judge himself.
- Hopeful, the resident of Vanity Fair, who takes Faithful's place as Christian's fellow traveller. The character Hopeful poses an inconsistency in that there is a necessity imposed on the pilgrims that they enter the "King's Highway" by the Wicket Gate. Hopeful, did not; however, of him, we read "... one died to bear testimony to the truth, and another rises out of his ashes to be a companion with Christian in his pilgrimage." Hopeful assumes Faithful's place by God's design. Theologically and allegorically it would follow in that "faith" is trust in God as far as things present are concerned, and "hope", biblically the same as "faith", is trust in God as far as things of the future are concerned. Hopeful would follow Faithful. The other factor is that Vanity Fair is right on the straight and narrow way. Ignorance, in contrast to Hopeful, was unconcerned about the end times of God, unconcerned with true faith in Jesus Christ, and gave false hope about the future. Ignorance was told by Christian and Hopeful that he should have entered the highway through the Wicket Gate.
- Mr. By-Ends, a false pilgrim met by Christian and Hopeful after they leave Vanity Fair. He makes it his aim to avoid any hardship or persecution that Christians may have to undergo. He supposedly perishes in the Hill Lucre (a dangerous silver mine) with three of his friends, Hold-the-World, Money-Love, and Save-All, at the behest of Demas, who invites passersby to come and see the mine. A "by-end" is a pursuit that is achieved indirectly. For By-Ends and his companions it is the pursuit of financial gain, indirectly through religion.
- Demas, a deceiver, who beckons to pilgrims at the Hill Lucre to come and join in the supposed silver mining going on in it. He is first mentioned in the Book of Second Timothy by the disciple Paul when he said, "Demas has deserted us because he loved the world". Demas tries two ways to trick Christian and Hopeful: first, he claims that the mine is safe and they will be rich, and then he claims that he is a pilgrim and will join them on their journey. Christian, filled with the Holy Spirit, is able to rebuke Demas and expose his lies.
- Giant Despair, the savage owner of Doubting Castle, where pilgrims are imprisoned and tortured. He is slain by Greatheart in the Second Part.
- Giantess Diffidence, Despair's wife, known to be cruel, savage, violent, and evil like her husband. She is slain by Old Honest in the Second Part.
- Knowledge, one of the shepherds of the Delectable Mountains.
- Experience, another of the Delectable Mountains shepherds.
- Watchful, another of the Delectable Mountains shepherds.
- Sincere, another of the Delectable Mountains shepherds.
- Ignorance, "the brisk young lad" (representing foolishness and conceit) who joins the "King's Highway" by way of the "crooked lane" that comes from his native country, called "Conceit". He follows Christian and Hopeful and on two occasions talks with them. He believes that he will be received into the Celestial City because of his doing good works in accordance with God's will. For him, Jesus Christ is only an example, not a Saviour. Christian and Hopeful try to set him right, but they fail. He gets a ferryman, Vain-Hope, to ferry him across the River of Death rather than cross it on foot as one is supposed to do. When he gets to the gates of the Celestial City, he is asked for a "certificate" needed for entry, which he does not have. The King upon hearing this, then, orders that he be bound and cast into Hell.
- The Flatterer, a deceiver dressed as an angel who leads Christian and Hopeful out of their way, when they fail to look at the road map given them by the Shepherds of the Delectable Mountains.
- Atheist, a mocker of Christian and Hopeful, who goes the opposite way on the "King's Highway" because he boasts that he knows that God and the Celestial City do not exist.

=== Second Part ===
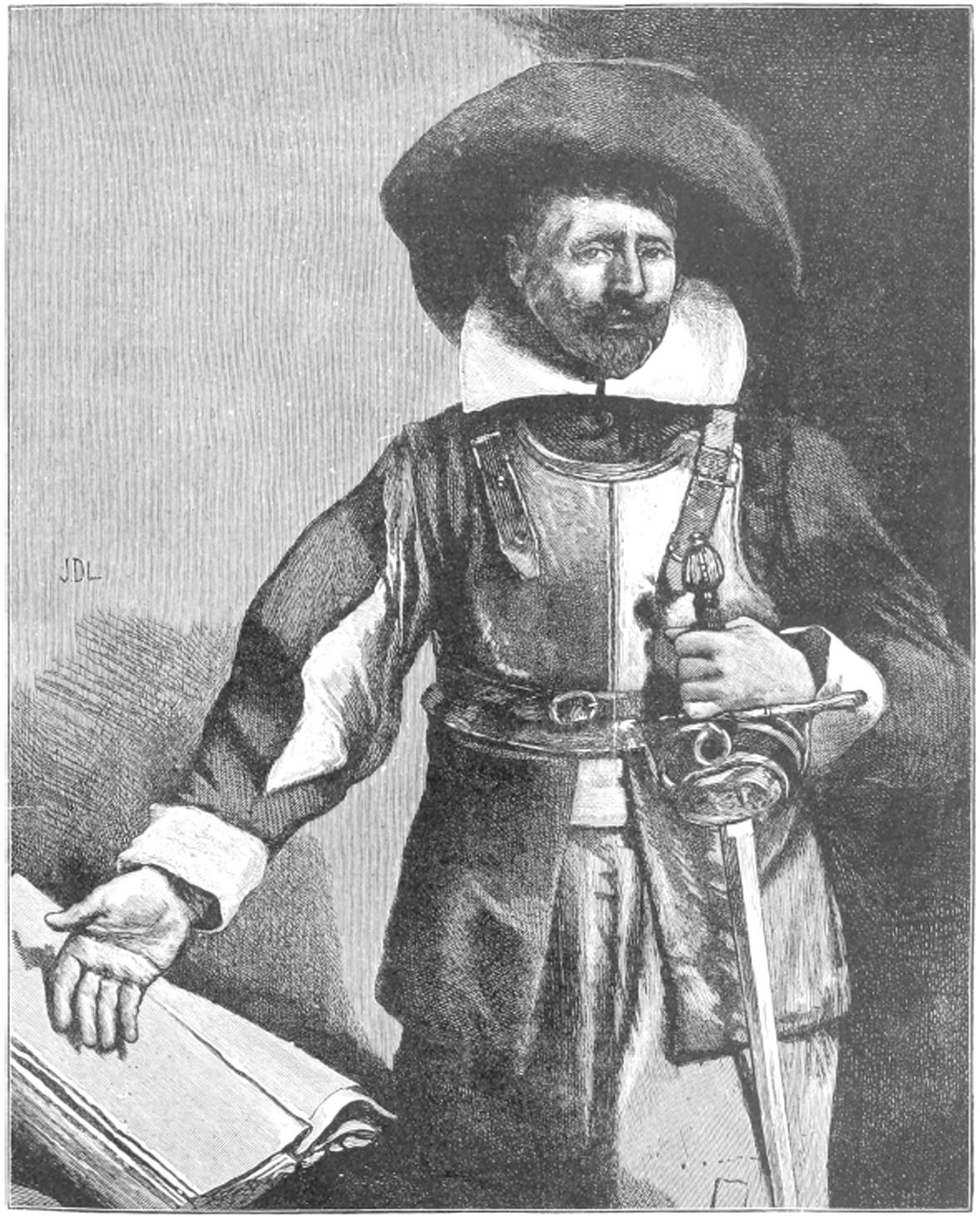
Mr. Valiant-For-Truth by James Dromgole Linton, engraving by the Brothers Dalziel (1880).

- Mr. Sagacity, a guest narrator who meets Bunyan himself in his new dream and recounts the events of the Second Part up to the arrival at the Wicket Gate.
- Christiana, wife of Christian, who leads her four sons and neighbour Mercy on pilgrimage.
- Matthew, Christian and Christiana's eldest son, who marries Mercy.
- Samuel, the second son, who marries Grace, Mr. Mnason's daughter.
- Joseph, the third son, who marries Martha, Mr. Mnason's daughter.
- James, fourth and youngest son, who marries Phoebe, Gaius's daughter.
- Mercy, Christiana's neighbour, who goes with her on pilgrimage and marries Matthew.
- Mrs. Timorous, a relative of the Timorous of the First Part, who comes with Mercy to see Christiana before she sets out on pilgrimage.
- Mrs. Bat's-Eyes, a resident of The City of Destruction and friend of Mrs. Timorous. Since she has a bat's eyes, she would be blind or nearly blind, so her characterization of Christiana as blind in her desire to go on pilgrimage is hypocritical.
- Mrs. Inconsiderate, a resident of The City of Destruction and friend of Mrs. Timorous. She characterizes Christiana's departure "a good riddance" as an inconsiderate person would.
- Mrs. Light-Mind, a resident of The City of Destruction and friend of Mrs. Timorous. She changes the subject from Christiana to gossip about being at a bawdy party at Madam Wanton's home.
- Mrs. Know-Nothing, a resident of The City of Destruction and friend of Mrs. Timorous. She wonders if Christiana will actually go on pilgrimage.
- Ill-favoured Ones, two evil characters Christiana sees in her dream, whom she and Mercy actually encounter when they leave the Wicket Gate. The two Ill Ones are driven off by Great-Heart himself.
- Innocent, a young serving maid of the Interpreter, who answers the door of the house when Christiana and her companions arrive; and who conducts them to the garden bath, which signifies Christian baptism.
- Mr. Greatheart, the guide and bodyguard sent by the Interpreter with Christiana and her companions from his house to their journey's end. He proves to be one of the main protagonists in the Second Part.
- Giant Grim, a Giant who "backs the [chained] lions" near the House Beautiful, slain by Great-Heart. He is also known as "Bloody-Man" because he has killed many pilgrims or sent them on mazes of detours, where they were lost forever.
- Humble-Mind, one of the maidens of the House Beautiful, who makes her appearance in the Second Part. She questions Matthew, James, Samuel, and Joseph about their godly faith and their hearts to the Lord God.
- Mr. Brisk, a suitor of Mercy's, who gives up courting her when he finds out that she makes clothing only to give away to the poor. He is shown to be a foppish, worldly-minded person who is double-minded about his beliefs.
- Mr. Skill, the godly physician called to the House Beautiful to cure Matthew of his illness, which is caused by eating the forbidden apples and fruits of Beelzebub which his mother told him not to, but he did it anyway.
- Giant Maul, a Giant whom Greatheart kills as the pilgrims leave the Valley of the Shadow of Death. He holds a grudge against Greatheart for doing his duty of saving pilgrims from damnation and bringing them from darkness to light, from evil to good, and from Satan, the Devil to Jesus Christ, the Saviour.
- Old Honest, a pilgrim from the frozen town of Stupidity who joins them, a welcome companion to Greatheart. Old Honest tells the stories of Mr. Fearing and a prideful villain named Mr. Self-Will.
- Mr. Fearing, a fearful pilgrim from the City of Destruction whom Greatheart had "conducted" to the Celestial City in an earlier pilgrimage. Noted for his timidness of Godly Fears such as temptations and doubts. He is Mr. Feeble-Mind's uncle.
- Gaius, an innkeeper with whom the pilgrims stay for some years after they leave the Valley of the Shadow of Death. He gives his daughter Phoebe to James in marriage. The lodging fee for his inn is paid by the Good Samaritan. Gaius tells them of the wicked Giant Slay-Good.
- Giant Slay-Good, a Giant who enlists the help of evildoers on the King's Highway to abduct, murder, and consume pilgrims before they get to Vanity Fair. He is killed by Greatheart.
- Mr. Feeble-Mind, rescued from Slay-Good by Mr. Greatheart, who joins Christiana's company of pilgrims. He is the nephew of Mr. Fearing.
- Phoebe, Gaius's daughter, who marries James.
- Mr. Ready-to-Halt, a pilgrim who meets Christiana's train of pilgrims at Gaius's door, and becomes the companion of Mr. Feeble-Mind, to whom he gives one of his crutches.
- Mr. Mnason, a resident of the town of Vanity, who puts up the pilgrims for a time, and gives his daughters Grace and Martha in marriage to Samuel and Joseph respectively.
- Grace, Mnason's daughter, who marries Samuel.
- Martha, Mnason's daughter, who marries Joseph.
- Christian and Christiana's Grandchildren, the children of Matthew, Samuel, Joseph, James and their respective wives(Mercy, Grace, Martha, and Phoebe). Born in Vanity Fair, they are left in the care of other pilgrims in a place where the children of pilgrims are raised for a time, due to being at a very tender age. They rejoin their parents by the time the pilgrims reach the Enchanted Ground. The exact number of children per couple, as well as their names and sexes is never disclosed.
- Mr. Despondency, a rescued prisoner from Doubting Castle owned by the miserable Giant Despair.
- Much-Afraid, his daughter.
- Mr. Valiant-For-Truth, a pilgrim they find all bloody, with his sword in his hand, after leaving the Delectable Mountains. He fought and defeated three robbers called Faint-Heart, Mistrust, and Guilt.
- Mr. Stand-Fast, a pilgrim found while praying for deliverance from Madame Bubble.
- Madame Bubble, a witch whose enchantments made the Enchanted Ground enchanted with an air that makes foolish pilgrims sleepy and never wake up again. She is the adulterous woman mentioned in the Biblical Book of Proverbs. Mr. Self-Will went over a bridge to meet her and never came back again.

== Places in The Pilgrim's Progress ==
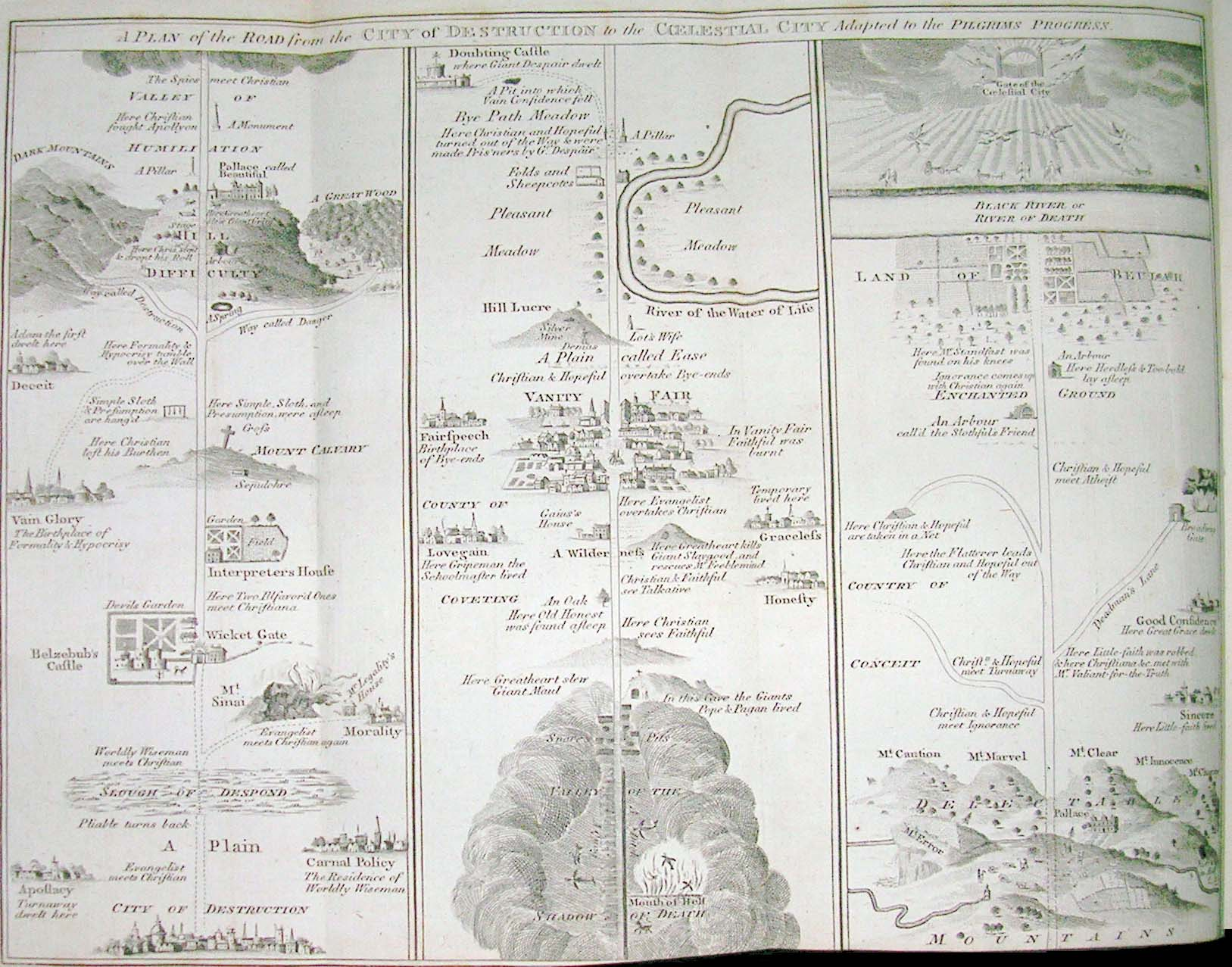
A map of the places Pilgrim travels through on his progress; a fold-out map from an edition printed in England in 1778

- City of Destruction, Christian's home, representative of the world (cf. Isaiah 19:18)
- Slough of Despond, the miry swamp on the way to the Wicket Gate; one of the hazards of the journey to the Celestial City. In the First Part, Christian, falling into it, sank further under the weight of his sins (his burden) and his sense of their guilt.
- Mount Sinai, a frightening mountain near the Village of Morality that threatens all who would go there.
- Wicket Gate, the entry point of the straight and narrow way to the Celestial City. Pilgrims are required to enter by way of the Wicket Gate. Beelzebub's castle was built not very far from the Gate.
- House of the Interpreter, a type of spiritual museum to guide the pilgrims to the Celestial City, emblematic of Calvary and the tomb of Christ.
- Hill Difficulty, both the hill and the road up is called "Difficulty"; it is flanked by two treacherous byways "Danger" and "Destruction". There are three choices: Christian takes "Difficulty" (the right way), and Formalist and Hypocrisy take the two other ways, which prove to be fatal dead ends.
- House Beautiful, a palace that serves as a rest stop for pilgrims to the Celestial City. It apparently sits atop the Hill Difficulty. From the House Beautiful one can see forward to the Delectable Mountains. It represents the Christian congregation, and Bunyan takes its name from a gate of the Second Temple (Acts 3:2, 10).
- Valley of Humiliation, the Valley on the other side of the Hill Difficulty, going down into which is said to be extremely slippery by the House Beautiful's damsel Prudence. It is where Christian, protected by God's Armor, meets Apollyon and they had that dreadful, long fight where Christian was victorious over his enemy by impaling Apollyon on his Sword of the Spirit (Word of God) which caused the Foul Fiend to fly away. Apollyon met Christian in the place known as "Forgetful Green". This Valley had been a delight to the "Lord of the Hill", Jesus Christ, in his "state of humiliation".
- Valley of the Shadow of Death, a treacherous, devilish Valley filled with demons, dragons, fiends, satyrs, goblins, hobgoblins, monsters, creatures from the bottomless pit, beasts from the mouth of Hell, darkness, terror, and horror with a quicksand bog on one side and a deep chasm/ditch on the other side of the King's Highway going through it (cf. Psalm 23).
- Gaius' Inn, a rest stop in the Second Part of the Pilgrim's Progress.
- Vanity Fair, a city through which the King's Highway passes and the yearlong Fair that is held there.
- Plain Ease, a pleasant area traversed by the pilgrims.
- Hill Lucre, location of a reputed silver mine that proves to be the place where By-Ends and his companions are lost. "Lucre" is a term denoting wealth.
- The Pillar of Salt, which was Lot's wife, who was turned into a pillar of salt when Sodom and Gomorrah were destroyed. The pilgrim's note that its location near the Hill Lucre is a fitting warning to those who are tempted by Demas to go into the Lucre silver mine.
- River of God or River of the Water of Life, a place of solace for the pilgrims. It flows through a meadow, green all year long and filled with lush fruit trees. In the Second Part the Good Shepherd is found there to whom Christiana's grandchildren are entrusted.
- By-Path Meadow, the place leading to the grounds of Doubting Castle.
- Doubting Castle, the home of Giant Despair and his Giantess wife, Diffidence; only one key could open its doors and gates, the key Promise.
- The Delectable Mountains, known as "Immanuel's Land". Lush country from whose heights one can see many delights and curiosities. It is inhabited by sheep and their shepherds, and from Mount Clear one can see the Celestial City.
- The Enchanted Ground, an area through which the King's Highway passes that has air that makes pilgrims want to stop to sleep. If one goes to sleep in this place, one never wakes up. The shepherds of the Delectable Mountains warn pilgrims about this.
- The Land of Beulah, a lush garden area just this side of the River of Death.
- The River of Death, the dreadful river that surrounds Mount Zion, deeper or shallower depending on the faith of the one traversing it.
- The Celestial City, the "Desired Country" of pilgrims, heaven, the dwelling place of the "Lord of the Hill", God. It is situated on Mount Zion.

== Geographical and topographical features behind the fictional places ==
Scholars have pointed out that Bunyan may have been influenced in the creation of places in The Pilgrim's Progress by his own surrounding environment. Albert Foster describes the natural features of Bedfordshire that apparently turn up in The Pilgrim's Progress. Vera Brittain in her thoroughly researched biography of Bunyan, identifies seven locations that appear in the allegory. Other connections are suggested in books not directly associated with either John Bunyan or The Pilgrim's Progress.

At least twenty-one natural or man-made geographical or topographical features from The Pilgrim's Progress have been identified—places and structures John Bunyan regularly would have seen as a child and, later, in his travels on foot or horseback. The entire journey from The City of Destruction to the Celestial City may have been based on Bunyan's own usual journey from Bedford, on the main road that runs less than a mile behind his cottage in Elstow, through Ampthill, Dunstable and St Albans, to London.

In the same sequence as these subjects appear in The Pilgrim's Progress, the geographical realities are as follows:

1. The plain (across which Christian fled) is Bedford Plain, which is 15 miles (about 24 km) wide, with the town of Bedford in the middle and the River Great Ouse meandering through the northern half;
2. The "Slough of Despond" (a major obstacle for Christian and Pliable: "a very miry slough") is the large deposits of gray clay, which supplied London Brick's works in Stewartby, which was closed in 2008. On either side of the Bedford to Ampthill road these deposits match Bunyan's description exactly. Presumably, the road was built on the "twenty thousand cart loads" of fill mentioned in The Pilgrim's Progress; However, the area beside Elstow brook, where John grew up, may also have been an early inspiration – on the north side of this brook, either side of the path to Elstow was (and still is) boggy and John would have known to avoid straying off the main path.
3. "Mount Sinai", the high hill on the way to the village of Morality, whose side "that was next the wayside, did hang so much over", is the red sandy cliffs just north of Ridgmont (i.e. "Rouge Mont");
4. The "Wicket Gate" could be the wooden gate at the entrance to the Elstow parish church or the wicket gate (small door) in the northern wooden entrance door at the west end of Elstow Abbey Church.
5. The castle, from which arrows were shot at those who would enter the Wicket Gate, could be the stand-alone belltower, beside Elstow Abbey church.
6. The "House of the Interpreter" is the rectory of St John's church in the south side of Bedford, where Bunyan was mentored by the pastor John Gifford;
7. The wall "Salvation" that fenced in the King's Highway coming after the House of the Interpreter is the red brick wall, over four miles long, beside the Ridgmont to Woburn road, marking the boundary of the Duke of Bedford's estate;
8. The "place somewhat ascending ... [with] a cross ... and a sepulchre" is the village cross and well that stands by the church at opposite ends of the sloping main street of Stevington, a small village five miles west of Bedford. Bunyan would often preach in a wood by the River Ouse just outside the village.
9. The "Hill Difficulty" is Ampthill Hill, on the main Bedford road, the steepest hill in the county. A sandy range of hills stretches across Bedfordshire from Woburn through Ampthill to Potton. These hills are characterized by dark, dense and dismal woods reminiscent of the byways "Danger" and "Destruction", the alternatives to the way "Difficulty" that goes up the hill;
10. The pleasant arbour on the way up the Hill Difficulty is a small "lay-by", part way up Ampthill Hill, on the east side. A photo, taken in 1908, shows a cyclist resting there;
11. The "very narrow passage" to the "Palace Beautiful" is an entrance cut into the high bank by the roadside to the east at the top of Ampthill Hill;
12. The "Palace Beautiful" is Houghton (formerly Ampthill) House, built in 1621 but a ruin since 1800. The house faced north; and, because of the dramatic view over the Bedford plain, it was a popular picnic site during the first half of the twentieth century when many families could not travel far afield; The entrance on the south side looks out over the town of Ampthill and towards the Chilterns, the model of "The Delectable Mountains". There was another source of inspiration; as a young boy, Bunyan would have seen, and been impressed by, Elstow Place — a grand mansion behind Elstow Church, built for Sir Thomas Hillersden from the cloister buildings of Elstow Abbey.
13. The "Valley of the Shadow of Death" is Millbrook gorge to the west of Ampthill;
14. "Vanity Fair" is probably also drawn from a number of sources. Some argue that local fairs in Elstow, Bedford and Ampthill were too small to fit Bunyan's description but Elstow's May fairs are known to have been large and rowdy and would certainly have made a big impression on the young Bunyan. Stourbridge Fair, held in Cambridge during late August and early September fits John Bunyan's account of the fair's antiquity and its vast variety of goods sold and sermons were preached each Sunday during Stourbridge Fair in an area called the "Dodderey". John Bunyan preached often in Toft, just four miles west of Cambridge, and there is a place known as "Bunyan's Barn" in Toft, so it is surmised that Bunyan visited the notable Stourbridge Fair;
15. The "pillar of salt", Lot's wife, is a weather-beaten statue that looks much like a person-sized salt pillar. It is on small island in the River Ouse just north of Turvey bridge, eight miles west of Bedford near Stevington;
16. The "River of the Water of Life", with trees along each bank is the River Ouse east of Bedford, where John Bunyan as a boy would fish with his sister Margaret. It might also be the valley of the river Flit, flowing through Flitton and Flitwick south of Ampthill;
17. "Doubting Castle" is Ampthill Castle, built in the early 15th century and often visited by King Henry VIII as a hunting lodge. Henry, corpulent and dour, may have been considered by Bunyan to be a model for Giant Despair. Ampthill Castle was used for the "house arrest" of Queen Catherine of Aragon and her retinue in 1535–36 before she was taken to Kimbolton. The castle was dismantled soon after 1660, so Bunyan could have seen its towers in the 1650s and known of the empty castle plateau in the 1670s. Giant Despair was killed and Doubting Castle was demolished in the second part of The Pilgrim's Progress.
18. The "Delectable Mountains" are the Chiltern Hills that can be seen from the second floor of Houghton House. "Chalk hills, stretching fifty miles from the Thames to Dunstable Downs, have beautiful blue flowers and butterflies, with glorious beech trees." Reminiscent of the possibility of seeing the Celestial City from Mount Clear, on a clear day one can see London's buildings from Dunstable Downs near Whipsnade Zoo;
19. The "Land of Beulah" is Middlesex county north and west of London, which then (over 150 years before modern suburban sprawl started) had pretty villages, market gardens, and estates containing beautiful parks and gardens): "woods of Islington to the green hills of Hampstead & Highgate";
20. The "very deep river" is the Thames, one thousand feet (300 m) wide at high tide; however, here Bunyan varied from geographical reality and put the city south of the river, and without a bridge.
21. The "Celestial City" is the City of London, the physical centre of John Bunyan's world—most of his neighbours never travelled that far. In the 1670s, after the Great Fire of 1666, London sported a new gleaming city centre with forty Wren churches. In the last decade of Bunyan's life (1678–88), some of his best Christian friends lived in London, including a Lord Mayor.

== Cultural influence ==
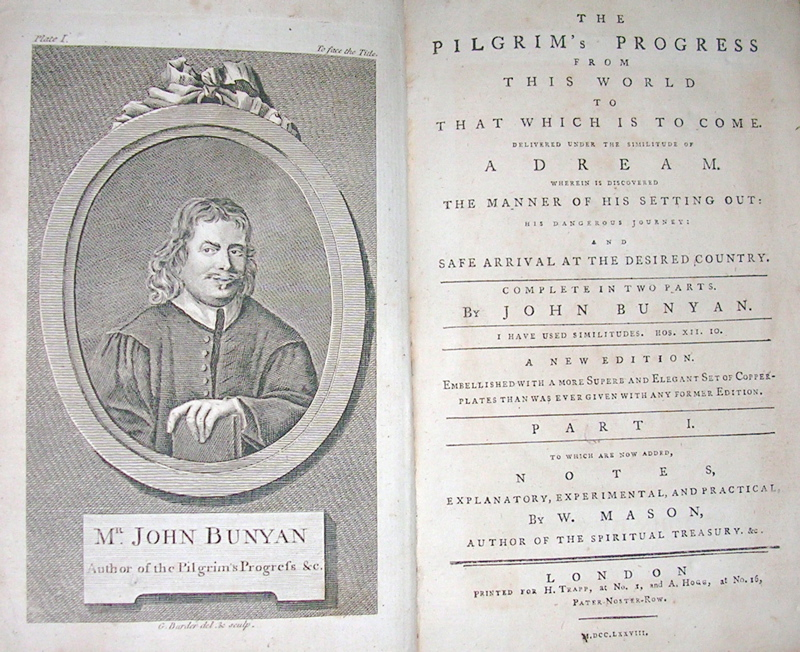
The frontispiece and title-page from an edition printed in England in 1778

=== Context in Christendom ===
The Pilgrim's Progress was much more popular than its predecessors. Bunyan's plain style breathes life into the abstractions of the anthropomorphized temptations and abstractions that Christian encounters and with whom he converses on his course to Heaven. Samuel Johnson said that "this is the great merit of the book, that the most cultivated man cannot find anything to praise more highly, and the child knows nothing more amusing". Three years after its publication (1681), it was reprinted in colonial America, and was widely read in the Puritan colonies. The book was often divided into smaller parts or individual episodes that could be made into individual sermons, postcards, or wall charts. During the late nineteenth and early twentieth centuries, the Religious Tract Society produced the book into Sunday School prize editions and cheap abridgements. There were also Bunyan inspired jigsaw puzzles, and some followers crafted their landscapes in Bunyan theme parks.

Because of its English Protestant theology, The Pilgrim's Progress shares the then-popular English antipathy toward the Catholic Church. It was published over the years of the Popish Plot (1678–1681) and ten years before the Glorious Revolution of 1688, and it shows the influence of John Foxe's Acts and Monuments. Bunyan presents a decrepit and harmless giant to confront Christian at the end of the Valley of the Shadow of Death that is explicitly named "Pope":

Now I saw in my Dream, that at the end of this Valley lay blood, bones, ashes, and mangled bodies of men, even of Pilgrims that had gone this way formerly: And while I was musing what should be the reason, I espied a little before me a Cave, where two Giants, Pope and Pagan, dwelt in old times, by whose Power and Tyranny the Men whose bones, blood ashes, &c. lay there, were cruelly put to death. But by this place Christian went without much danger, whereat I somewhat wondered; but I have learnt since, that Pagan has been dead many a day; and as for the other, though he be yet alive, he is by reason of age, and also of the many shrewd brushes that he met with in his younger dayes, grown so crazy and stiff in his joynts, that he can now do little more than sit in his Caves mouth, grinning at Pilgrims as they go by, and biting his nails, because he cannot come at them.

When Christian and Faithful travel through Vanity Fair, Bunyan adds the editorial comment:

But as in other fairs, some one Commodity is as the chief of all the fair, so the Ware of Rome and her Merchandize is greatly promoted in this fair: Only our English Nation, with some others, have taken a dislike thereat.

In the Second Part, while Christiana and her group of pilgrims led by Greatheart stay for some time in Vanity, the city is terrorized by a seven-headed beast which is driven away by Greatheart and other stalwarts. In his endnotes, W. R. Owens notes about the woman that governs the beast: "This woman was believed by Protestants to represent Antichrist, the Church of Rome. In a posthumously published treatise, Of Antichrist, and his Ruine (1692), Bunyan gave an extended account of the rise and (shortly expected) fall of Antichrist."

Christiana's character works to reflect the rising literacy of lower classes in 16th century England. This mimics the work of Bunyan within Grace Abounding, as it detailed his own journey towards literacy and hardship of spirituality. It entails a foundation for independent study and practices fueled by the increase in literacy that Bunyan faced, which are present through the inclusion of Christiana's literacy and her independent choice to proceed on the pilgrimage, following her husband Christian.

There are many similarities between Bunyan's spiritual community and the actions taken by Christiana and her spiritual community throughout Part Two. In Christiana's invitation to go on pilgrimage, it is made clear by the Visitor that it must be an independent induction into her spiritual journey. This mirrors the practices of integration of women into the Bedford Congregation, as the women were accepted independently from their husbands and family.

A similar reflection of the Bedford congregation within Pilgrim's Progress Part Two is the catechism that occurs to Christiana's sons within the House Beautiful. In Part Two this catechism is done by Prudence, Piety, and Charity who individually question Christiana's sons to discern the depth of the spiritual education they have received. This appears in recorded minutes of the Bedford Congregation, as established members (both men and women) catechized prospective members of their congregation.

=== Foreign-language versions ===
African version of Pilgrim's Progress from 1902

"The Pilgrim's Progress has been translated into 200 languages", including Dutch in 1681, German in 1703, and Swedish in 1727, as well as over eighty African languages. In 1681, the first North American edition was issued. In addition, there were nine translations in Southeast Asia, twenty four translations in South Asia, and another eleven in Australasia and the Pacific. Beginning in the 1850s, illustrated versions of The Pilgrim's Progress in Chinese were printed in Hong Kong, Shanghai and Fuzhou and widely distributed by Protestant missionaries. Hong Xiuquan, the leader of the Christianity-inspired Taiping Rebellion, declared that the book was his favorite reading.

Paradeshi Mokshayathra by Rev. K. Koshy/Rev. Joseph Peet (1844), and Sanchariyude Prayanam (1846) by Rev. C. Muller/Rev. P. Chandran are allegorical translations in Malayalam and are one of the earliest prose works in the language.

In Turkish, translations of the book appeared in Greek script in 1879, and in Armenian script in 1881.

Tamil language adaptations of the work include Rev. Samuel Paul's Motcha Prayanam (1882), Henry Alfred Krishnapillai's magnum opus, Ratchanya Yaathrigam (1894; The Journey of Salvation), and Suveegaranar's Muthi Vazhi Ammaanai (1896) The second of these works is considered one of the finest Tamil literary works of the 19th century.

The literal textual meaning of The Pilgrim's Progress was also adapted by young converts and missionaries to make sense in different cultural contexts. "For example, Kele Protestants in the Congo omitted the sections that explained original sin" since "this idea was incompatible with their cultural assumptions." The Pilgrim's Progress was also adapted to be relevant for non-Europeans, by tailoring the story to make sense of their own experiences. Heaven was often a place designed to resemble what they had gone through in life. For example, in the American Southern Black culture, Bunyan was changed to be a black protagonist who "was redeemed not only from sin but also slavery." Similarly, a version was written where the injustices which took place in South Africa were reformulated.

There are collections of old foreign language versions of The Pilgrim's Progress at both the Moot Hall Museum in Elstow, and at the John Bunyan Museum in Mill Street in Bedford.

=== The "Third Part" ===
Tender-Conscience, hero of Part Three, awakens from sleep in the palace of Carnal-Security

The Third Part of the Pilgrim's Progress was written by an anonymous author; beginning in 1693, it was published with Bunyan's authentic two parts. It continued to be republished with Bunyan's work until 1852. This third part presented the pilgrimage of Tender-Conscience and his companions.

=== Dramatic and musical settings ===
The book was the basis of a condensed radio adaptation, originally presented in 1942 and starring John Gielgud, which included, as background music, several excerpts from Ralph Vaughan Williams' orchestral works.

The book was the basis of The Pilgrim's Progress (opera) by Vaughan Williams, premiered in 1951.

The radio version was newly recorded by Hyperion Records in 1990. The performance was conducted by Matthew Best and it again starred Gielgud, and also featured Richard Pasco and Ursula Howells.

In 1912, English composer Ernest Austin set the whole story as a huge narrative tone poem for solo organ, with optional 6-part choir and narrator, lasting approximately 2 1/2 hours.

Under the name The Similitude of a Dream, the progressive rock band of Neal Morse released a concept album based on The Pilgrim's Progress in November 2016. A sequel, entitled The Great Adventure, focusing on Christian's son Joseph, was released in January 2019. Both albums received critical acclaim.

=== Art and poetry ===
A number of illustrations created by Henry Melville appear in the Fisher's Drawing Room Scrap Books under the editorship of Letitia Elizabeth Landon. Each is accompanied by a poem, either by Bernard Barton or by Miss Landon herself. These plates are as follows:

- 1835
  - The River of the Water of Life. (L. E. L.)
  - Christian and Hopeful Escaping from the Doubting Castle (Bernard Barton)
  - Christian Got up at the Gate (Bernard Barton)
  - The Shepherd Boy in the Valley of Humiliation as The Shepherd Boy. (L. E. L.)
- 1836
  - The Pilgrims (Bernard Barton)
  - The Land of Beulah (Bernard Barton)
  - Destruction of the Doubting Castle (Bernard Barton)
  - The Palace Called Beautiful. (L. E. L.)
- 1837
  - The Delectable Mountains. (L. E. L.)

The Pilgrim's Progress was a favourite subject among painters in 1840s America, including major figures of the Hudson River School and others associated with the National Academy of Design. Daniel Huntington, Jasper Cropsey, Frederic Edwin Church, Jesse Talbot, Edward Harrison May, and others completed canvases based on the work. Thomas Cole's The Voyage of Life was inspired by The Pilgrim's Progress.

In 1850, Huntington, Cropsey, and Church contributed designs to a moving panorama based on The Pilgrim's Progress, conceptualized by May and fellow artist Joseph Kyle, which debuted in New York and travelled all over the country. A second version of the panorama, organized by Kyle and artist Jacob Dallas, premiered in 1851. The second version exists today in the collections of the Saco Museum.

=== References in literature ===
In Wole Soyinka's novel Chronicles from the Land of the Happiest People on Earth (2021), the third chapter is entitled 'Pilgrim's Progress'. In describes the travels of the character Dennis Tibidje. He encounters John Bunyan's book Pilgrim's Progress while detained as an illegal immigrant in New Jersey.

Charles Dickens' book Oliver Twist (1838) is subtitled 'The Parish Boy's Progress'. The titular character of The Life and Adventures of Nicholas Nickleby (1839) and his companion Smike start to read it but are interrupted.

The title of William Makepeace Thackeray's 1847–1848 novel Vanity Fair alludes to the location in Bunyan's work.

Mark Twain gave his 1869 travelogue, The Innocents Abroad, the alternative title The New Pilgrims' Progress. In Twain's later work Adventures of Huckleberry Finn, the titular character mentions The Pilgrim's Progress as he describes the works of literature in the Grangerfords' library. Twain uses this to satirize the Protestant Southern aristocracy.

E. E. Cummings makes numerous references to it in his prose work, The Enormous Room.

Nathaniel Hawthorne's short story, "The Celestial Railroad", recreates Christian's journey in Hawthorne's time. Progressive thinkers have replaced the footpath by a railroad, and pilgrims may now travel under steam power. The journey is considerably faster, but somewhat more questionable. Hawthorne's novel The Scarlet Letter also makes reference to it, by way of the author John Bunyan with a metaphor comparing a main character's eyes with the fire depicted in the entrance to Hell in The Pilgrim's Progress.

John Buchan was an admirer of Bunyan's, and Pilgrim's Progress features significantly in his third Richard Hannay novel, Mr. Standfast, which also takes its title from one of Bunyan's characters.

Alan Moore, in his League of Extraordinary Gentlemen, enlists The Pilgrim's Progress protagonist, Christian, as a member of the earliest version of this group, Prospero's Men, having become wayward on his journey during his visit in Vanity Fair, stepping down an alleyway and found himself in London in the 1670s, and unable to return to his homeland. This group disbanded in 1690 after Prospero vanished into the Blazing World; however, some parts of the text seem to imply that Christian resigned from Prospero's League before its disbanding and that Christian travelled to the Blazing World before Prospero himself. The apparent implication is that; within the context of the League stories; the Celestial City Christian seeks and the Blazing World may in fact be one and the same.

In Louisa May Alcott's Little Women, the protagonist Jo and her sisters read it at the outset of the novel, and try to follow the good example of Bunyan's Christian. Throughout the novel, the main characters refer many times to Pilgrim's Progress and liken the events in their own lives to the experiences of the pilgrims. A number of chapter titles directly reference characters and places from Pilgrim's Progress.

The cartoonist Winsor McCay drew an allegorical comic strip, entitled A Pilgrim's Progress, in the New York Evening Telegram. The strip ran from 26 June 1905 to 18 December 1910. In it, the protagonist Mr. Bunion is constantly frustrated in his attempts to improve his life by ridding himself of his burdensome valise, "Dull Care".

C. S. Lewis wrote a book inspired by The Pilgrim's Progress, called The Pilgrim's Regress, in which a character named John follows a vision to escape from The Landlord, a less friendly version of The Owner in The Pilgrim's Regress. It is an allegory of C. S. Lewis' own journey from a religious childhood to a pagan adulthood in which he rediscovers his Christian God.

Henry Williamson's The Patriot's Progress references the title of The Pilgrim's Progress and the symbolic nature of John Bunyan's work. The protagonist of the semi-autobiographical novel is John Bullock, the quintessential English soldier during World War I.

The character of Billy Pilgrim in Kurt Vonnegut's novel Slaughterhouse-5: The Children's Crusade is a clear homage to a similar journey to enlightenment experienced by Christian, although Billy's journey leads him to an existential acceptance of life and of a fatalist human condition. Vonnegut's parallel to The Pilgrim's Progress is deliberate and evident in Billy's surname.

Charlotte Brontë refers to Pilgrim's Progress in most of her novels, including Jane Eyre, Shirley, and Villette. Her alterations to the quest-narrative have led to much critical interest, in particular with the ending of Jane Eyre.

In Winnie Parry's Sioned (1906), the Welsh translation Taith Y Pererin is the titular Sioned's favorite book. The edition is that of 1880, Wrexam: R. Hughes & Son.

Walt Willis and Bob Shaw's classic science fiction fan novelette, The Enchanted Duplicator, is explicitly modeled on The Pilgrim's Progress and has been repeatedly reprinted over the decades since its first appearance in 1954: in professional publications, in fanzines, and as a monograph.

Enid Blyton wrote The Land of Far Beyond (1942) as a children's version of The Pilgrim's Progress.

John Steinbeck's novel The Grapes of Wrath mentions The Pilgrim's Progress as one of an (anonymous) character's favorite books. Steinbeck's novel was itself an allegorical spiritual journey by Tom Joad through America during the Great Depression, and often made Christian allusions to sacrifice and redemption in a world of social injustice.

The book was commonly referenced in African American slave narratives, such as "Running a Thousand Miles for Freedom" by Ellen and William Craft, to emphasize the moral and religious implications of slavery.

Hannah Hurnard's novel Hinds' Feet on High Places (1955) uses a similar allegorical structure to The Pilgrim's Progress and takes Bunyan's character Much-Afraid as its protagonist.

In Lois McMaster Bujold's The Borders of Infinity (1989), Miles Vorkosigan uses half a page torn from The Pilgrim's Progress as a coded message to his fleet to rescue him and 9,000 others from a POW camp.

Sir Walter Scott uses Bunyan's tale in chapter 32 of his novel The Heart of Midlothian (1818) to illustrate the relationship between Madge Wildfire and Jeanie Deans. Madge explains: "But it is all over now.—But we'll knock at the gate and then the keeper will admit Christiana, but Mercy will be left out—and then I'll stand at the door trembling and crying, and then Christiana—that's you, Jeanie,—will intercede for me. And then Mercy,—that's me, ye ken,—will faint[.]"

In Marguerite Young's novel, Miss MacIntosh, My Darling, the titular character always carries a copy of Pilgrim's Progress with her. The structure of the novel is inspired by Pilgrim's Progress too, being composed largely of the narrator's seemingly omniscient reminiscences about other characters' inner lives and dreams.

In George Eliot's novel Middlemarch, a lengthy quotation from the conclusion of the trial of Faithful in Vanity Fair serves as the epigraph to Chapter 85.

At the beginning of Beppe Fenoglio's novel Il Partigiano Johnny, Johnny is nervously reading from The Pilgrim's Progress, the tragedies of Marlowe, and the poetry of Browning.

== Dramatizations, music, and film ==
- In 1850, a moving panorama of Pilgrim's Progress, known as the Bunyan Tableuax or the Grand Moving Panorama of Pilgrim's Progress was painted by Joseph Kyle and Edward Harrison May and displayed in New York; an early copy of this panorama survives and is at the Saco Museum in Maine.
- The novel was made into a film, Pilgrim's Progress, in 1912.
- In 1950, an hour-long animated version was made by Baptista Films. This version was edited down to 35 minutes and re-released with new music in 1978. As of 2007 the original version is difficult to find, but the 1978 version has been released on both VHS and DVD.
- In 1951, the first performance of the opera The Pilgrim's Progress, composed by Ralph Vaughan Williams, was presented at the Royal Opera House, Covent Garden.
- In 1974, Genesis released the concept album The Lamb Lies Down on Broadway, which Peter Gabriel described as "a kind of punk" twist to The Pilgrim's Progress.
- In 1978, another film version was made by Ken Anderson, in which Liam Neeson, in his film debut, played the role of the Evangelist and also appeared as the crucified Christ. Maurice O'Callaghan played Appolyon and Worldly Wiseman, and Peter Thomas played The Pilgrim/Christian. A sequel, Christiana, followed later.
- In 1978, a musical based loosely on Bunyan's characters, and the story was written by Nick Taylor and Alex Learmont. The musical [originally titled Pilgrim] was produced for the Natal Performing Arts Council under the title "Christian!" or Follow the Man with the Big Bass Drum in the Holy Glory Band, and ran to capacity houses for the 1979/80 summer season in Durban's Old Alhambra Theatre. The show moved to Johannesburg in March 1980 and ran for a further three months at His Majesty's Theatre. After a substantial re-write Christian! was again mounted at the new Playhouse in Durban for the 1984 Christmas season. The musical has been performed many times since by schools and amateur theatrical groups in South Africa. After 30 years the show is again attracting attention both locally and abroad and the score and libretto are being updated and made more flexible for large and small productions.
- In 1985 Yorkshire Television produced a 129-minute nine-part serial presentation of The Pilgrim's Progress with animated stills by Alan Parry and narrated by Paul Copley entitled Dangerous Journey.
- In 1988, Glenn Danzig and Danzig (band) released their controversial music video from their song "Mother" which included the quote "Then I saw there was a way to Hell from the gates of Heaven" in the beginning of the music video from The Pilgrim's Progress.
- In 1989, Orion's Gate, a producer of Biblical / Spiritual audio dramas produced The Pilgrim's Progress as a six-hour audio dramatization. This production was followed several years later by Christiana: Pilgrim's Progress, Part II, another 8 hour audio dramatization.
- In 1989, The Ocean Blue released The Ocean Blue which includes the song "Vanity Fair" which includes lyrics that reference The Pilgrim's Progress.
- In 1993, the popular Christian radio drama, Adventures in Odyssey (produced by Focus on the Family), featured a two-part story, titled "Pilgrim's Progress: Revisited". This two-parter was written and directed by Phil Lollar.
- The 1993 video game Doom features a map called "Slough of Despair" (E3M2: episode 3, map 2).
- In the 1990s Kurt and Keith Landaas, composed, directed and performed a compelling stage two-act modern rock opera adaptation of Pilgrims Progress. It involved five principal characters and a cast choral of about 20 members. It was performed in the Lambs theatre in NYC in 1994 and other tri-state venues. A studio recording was also produced and distributed.
- In 1994, The Pilgrim's Progress and the imprisonment of John Bunyan were the subject of the musical Celestial City by David MacAdam, with John Curtis, and an album was released in 1997.
- In 2003 the game Heaven Bound was released by Emerald Studios. The 3D adventure-style game, based on the novel, was only released for the PC.
- The developer Scott Cawthon directed and narrated a 2004 computer animation version of the book, and also produced a 2011 video game adaptation.
- In 2008, a film version by Danny Carrales, Pilgrim's Progress: Journey to Heaven, was produced. It received one nomination for best feature length independent film and one nomination for best music score at the 2009 San Antonio Independent Christian Film Festival.
- British music band Kula Shaker released an album called Pilgrim's Progress on 28 June 2010.
- In 2003, Michael W. Smith wrote a song, called "Signs", which he says on his A 20 Year Celebration live DVD to be inspired by The Pilgrim's Progress.
- Season 7, episode 16 of Family Guy (17 May 2009) is a parody of The Pilgrim's Progress called "Peter's Progress".
- In 2010, FishFlix.com released A Pilgrim's Progress – The Story of John Bunyan, a DVD documentary about Bunyan's life narrated by Derick Bingham, filmed on location in England.
- In 2010, writer / director Andrew Wiest directed The Adventures of Chris Fable (aka The Wylds) bringing John Bunyan's novel The Pilgrim's Progress to life on the screen with this family friendly fantasy adventure about a young runaway on a quest to find his long lost father. The movie was released on video and streaming in 2012.
- In 2013, Puritan Productions company announced the premiere of its dramatization with ballet & chorus accompaniment in Fort Worth, Texas at the W.E. Scott Theatre on 18–19 October 2013. Subsequent productions by the same company in Garland, Texas at the Granville Arts Center on 24–26 October 2014, and in Austin, Texas, accompanied by ballet & chorus, at Park Hills Baptist Church on 4–5 November 2016.
- In 2014, a Kickstarter-supported novel called The Narrow Road was published. It is based on The Pilgrim's Progress, and was written by Erik Yeager and illustrated by Dave dela Gardelle.
- The 2015 Terrence Malick film Knight of Cups was inspired by The Pilgrim's Progress.
- In March 2015, director Darren Wilson announced a Kickstarter campaign to produce a full-length feature film based on The Pilgrims Progress called Heaven Quest: A Pilgrim's Progress Movie.
- The Neal Morse Band released their 2nd album titled The Similitude of a Dream on 11 November 2016, a 2 CD concept album based on the book The Pilgrim's Progress. On 25 January 2019, a follow-up 2 CD album, The Great Adventure, was released to continue re-telling the story from the perspective of Christian's son.
- In 2019, a computer-animated film adaptation titled The Pilgrim's Progress was released and featured the voice of John Rhys-Davies.
- The allegory was adapted into a dramatic, serialized podcast, High and Silver Presents: The Pilgrim's Progress, in 2022.
- The album Odyssey to the West by progressive metal deathcore band Slice the Cake is loosely inspired by The Pilgrim's Progress, and includes a track named after the novel.

== Editions ==
- Bunyan, John The Pilgrim's Progress. Edited by Roger Sharrock and J. B. Wharey. (Oxford: Oxford University Press, 1975) ISBN 0198118023. The standard critical edition, originally published in 1928 and revised in 1960 by Sharrock.
- Bunyan, John The Pilgrim's Progress. Edited with an introduction and notes by Roger Sharrrock. (Harmondsworth: Penguin, 1987) ISBN 0140430040. The text is based on the 1975 Clarendon edition (see above), but with modernised spelling and punctuation "to meet the needs of the general reader".
- Bunyan, John The Pilgrim's Progress. Edited with an Introduction and Notes by W.R. Owens, Professor of English Literature at the University of Bedfordshire (Oxford: Oxford University Press, New edition 2003 with text and index taken from the 1966 edition) ISBN 978-0-19-280361-0. Reissued 2008, 333 pages with explanatory notes, glossary and index. ISBN 978-0-19-953813-3.

=== Abridged editions ===
- The Children's Pilgrim's Progress. The story taken from the work by John Bunyan. New York: Sheldon and Company, 1866.
- Dangerous Journey: The Story of Pilgrim's Progress – abridged by Oliver Hunkin and illustrated by Alan Parry, 1985.

=== Retellings ===
- Pilgrim's Progress retold and shortened for modern readers by Mary Godolphin (1884). Drawings by Robert Lawson. Philadelphia: J.B. Lippincott Co., 1939. [a newly illustrated edition of the retelling by Mary Godolphin]
- The Pilgrim's Progress in Words of One Syllable by Mary Godolphin. London: George Routledge and Sons, 1869.
- The Pilgrim's Progress by John Bunyan Every Child Can Read. Edited by Jesse Lyman Hurlbut. Philadelphia: The John C. Winston Co., 1909.
- John Bunyan's Dream Story: the Pilgrim's Progress retold for children and adapted to school reading by James Baldwin. New York: American Book Co., 1913.
- The Land of Far-Beyond by Enid Blyton. Methuen, 1942.
- Eliot Wirt, Sherwood (1969). Passport to Life City: A Modern Pilgrim's Progress. New York: Harper & Row Publishers. ISBN 9780854212200. The story is set in a 20th-century America, concerned about the threat of World War Three, where the hero turns to Christ as there is a crisis involving China and the places he goes to are more futuristic.
- Pilgrim's Progress in Today's English – as retold by James H. Thomas. Moody Publishers. 1971. ISBN 080246520X. LCCN 64-25255.
- Pilgrim's Progress, from This World to That Which Is to Come. Rev., 2nd ed., in modern English – Christian Literature Crusade, Fort Washington, Penn., 1981.
- Little Pilgrim's Progress – Helen L. Taylor simplifies the vocabulary and concepts for younger readers, while keeping the storyline intact. Published by Moody Press, a ministry of Moody Bible Institute, Chicago, Illinois, 1992, 1993.
- John Bunyan's Pilgrim's Progress as retold by Gary D. Schmidt & illustrated by Barry Moser published by William B. Eerdmans Publishing Company, Grand Rapids, Michigan. Copyright 1994.
- The Evergreen Wood: An Adaptation of the "Pilgrim's Progress" for Children written by Linda Perry, illustrated by Alan Perry. Published by Hunt & Thorpe, 1997.
- The New Amplified Pilgrim's Progress (both book and dramatized audio) – as retold by James Pappas. Published by Orion's Gate (1999). A slightly expanded and highly dramatized version of John Bunyan's original. Large samples of the text are available
- "The Aussie Pilgrim's Progress" by Kel Richards. Ballarat: Strand Publishing, 2005.
- "Quest for Celestia: A Reimagining of The Pilgrim's Progress" by Steven James, 2006
- The Pilgrim's Progress – A 21st Century Re-telling of the John Bunyan Classic – Dry Ice Publishing, 2008 directed by Danny Carrales

==== Graphic novels ====
- Pilgrim's Progress – a graphic novel by Marvel Comics. Thomas Nelson, 1993. Includes a sequel story, "Christiana's Progress".
- Stephen T. Moore (2011). "The Pilgrim's Progress" A very graphic novel. CreateSpace Independent Publishing Platform. 150. ISBN 978-1-4610-3271-7.
- Sato, Masako (2012). マンガ天路歴程. ISBN 978-4904656075. A manga version of Pilgrim's Progress.
- Pilgrim's Progress the Graphic Novel, written and illustrated by Ralph Sanders, 2018, Whistle Key Books, ISBN 978-0-692-96574-0
- "RUN: The Pilgrim's Progress (ピルグリムのプログレス）". Alpha Yu, illustration. Shonen Bag Studio. 2018. A webmanga retelling the basic framework of the book with contemporary character designs heavily influenced by popular anime, as well as retooling the story to wrap it around manga tropes and conventions. (The creator has gone on record stating that the character of the Interpreter was designed to resemble a pre-pubescant version of Rei Ayanami. He has also gone on record saying that the character of Faithful is "best waifu" multiple times.) Drastic changes were made to the underlying puritan philosophy of the original text.
