= Saco Historic District =

Historic district in Maine, United States

- U.S. National Register of Historic Places
- U.S. Historic district
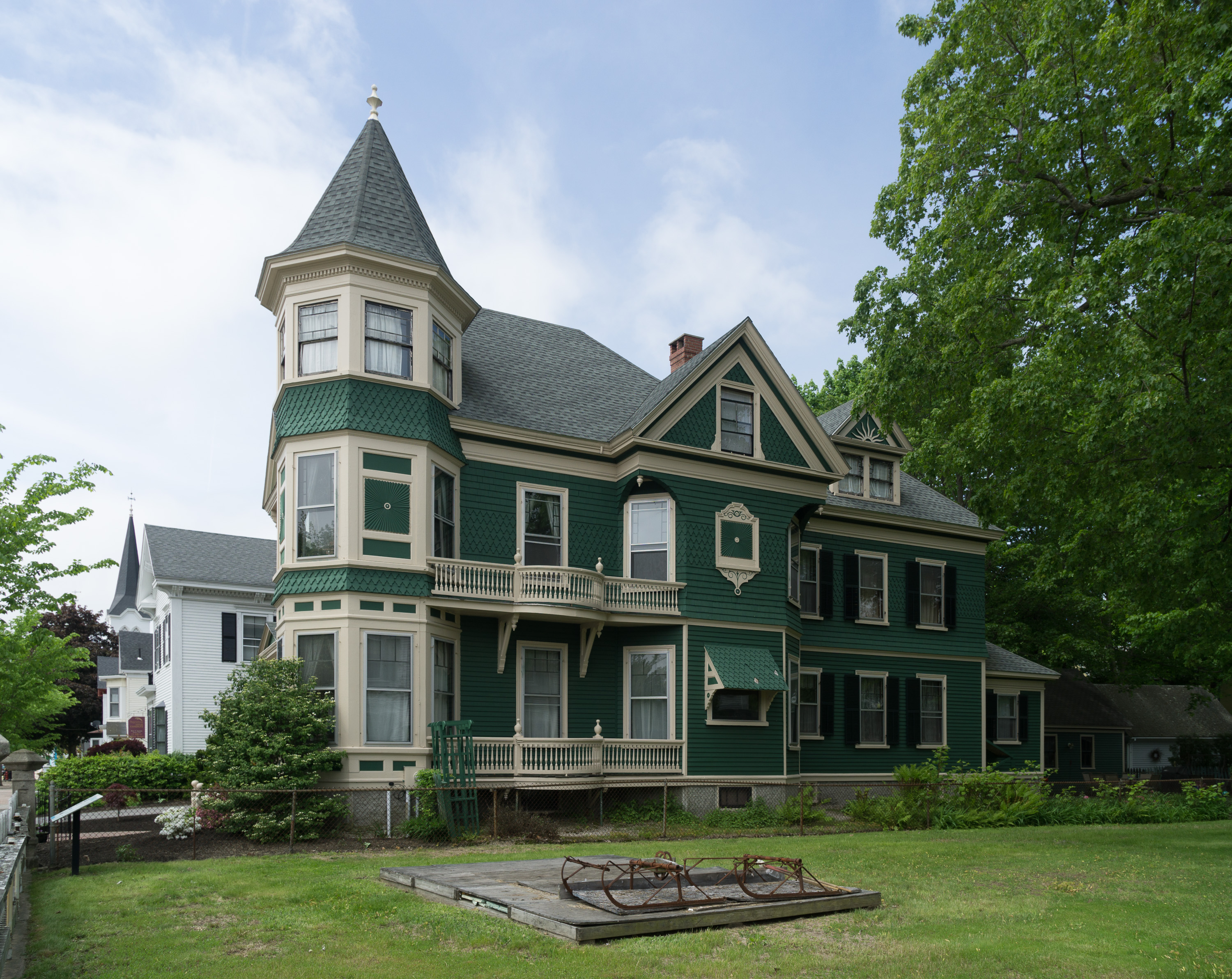
- Emma Hall House is a Queen Anne style residence in the historic district

- Location within Maine Location within the United States
- Location: Roughly bounded by Elm, North, Beach, and Main Streets., Saco, Maine
- Coordinates: 43°30′10″N 70°26′51″W
- Area: 103 acres (42 ha)
- Architect: multiple
- Architectural style: Federal, Queen Anne, Italianate
- NRHP reference No.: 98000594
- Added to NRHP: June 12, 1998

The Saco Historic District encompasses the historic commercial and residential centers of Saco, Maine. Covering more than 100 acres (40 ha) of central Saco, it includes houses from the 18th through 20th centuries, and the main business district along Main Street. It was added to the National Register of Historic Places in 1998.

== Description and history ==
Saco, located in southern Maine on the east side of the Saco River, was incorporated as Pepperellborough in 1762, honoring its major landowner, Sir William Pepperrell. Development was at first restricted to a small area near what is now called Factory Island in the Saco River, and did not begin to broaden until the early 18th century, because many of Pepperrell's lands were seized by the state because his heirs were Loyalist during the American Revolution, and were not sold off until 1798-99. Saco experienced significant economic growth in the 19th century, primarily through lumber, which was brought down the Saco from the interior, and the large textile mills which were first built on Factory Island in 1826. These industries both declined beginning in the 1940s.

The historic district is roughly cruciform in shape, centered on the five-way junction of Main, Elm, Beach, and North Streets. Main Street (Maine State Route 9) and the main business district extends southwest, become more residential to the northeast of the junction, while the other roads are more residential in character. The oldest building in the district, dating to the late 18th century, is the Solomon Coit House at 380 Main Street, which was built in 1785. Two other houses, built in the 18th century, are like the Coit House Georgian in style, although that style was out of fashion when they were built. The district has a good representation of Federal period housing, and the Greek Revival, which came after the introduction of the mills, is also well represented. The Emma Hall House, at 342 Main Street, is the best example of a Queen Anne residence in the historic district.

Three buildings in the district are separately listed on the National Register. Saco City Hall is a fine transitional Greek Revival-Italianate brick building, built in 1855. The J.G. Deering House is a high-quality Italianate house, which now houses the local library and historical museum. The Thacher-Goodale House on North Street (built 1828) is the city's finest example of a temple-fronted Greek Revival house. A fourth property, the First Parish Church on Beach Street, was listed, but was destroyed by fire in 2000, and has since been delisted.

== See also ==
- National Register of Historic Places listings in York County, Maine
