= Slough of Despond =

Fictional bog in The Pilgrim's Progress

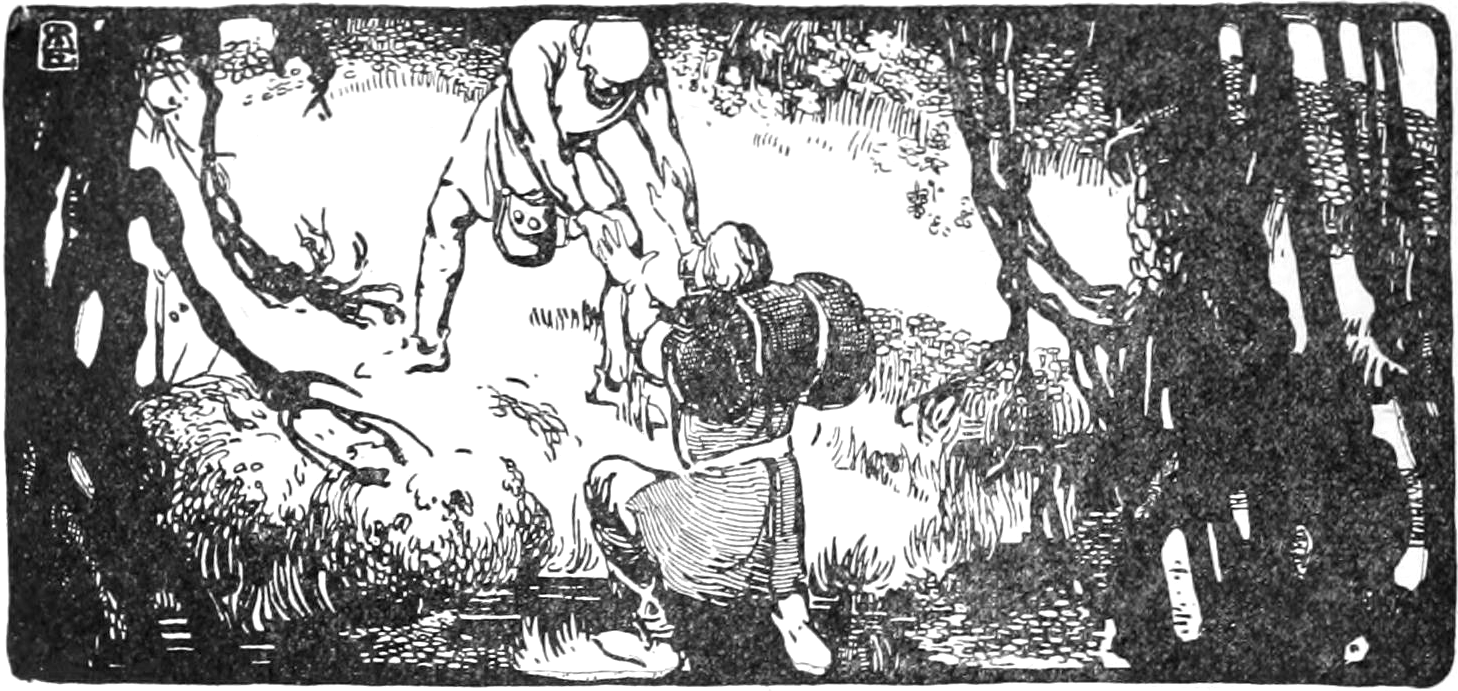
The Slough of Despond, illustrated by Rachael Robinson Elmer, 1913

The Slough of Despond (/ˈslaʊ ... dɪˈspɒnd/ or /ˈsluː/; "swamp of despair") is a fictional bog in John Bunyan's allegory The Pilgrim's Progress, into which the protagonist Christian sinks under the weight of his sins and his sense of guilt for them.

It is described in the text:

This miry Slough is such a place as cannot be mended; it is the descent whither the scum and filth that attends conviction for sin doth continually run, and therefore is it called the Slough of Despond: for still as the sinner is awakened about his lost condition, there ariseth in his soul many fears, and doubts, and discouraging apprehensions, which all of them get together, and settle in this place; and this is the reason of the badness of this ground.

The "Slough of Despond" may have been inspired by Squitch Fen, a wet and marshy area near his cottage in Harrowden, Bedfordshire, which Bunyan had to cross on his way to church in Elstow, or "The Souls' Slough" on the Great North Road between Tempsford and Biggleswade.

== Allusions in other literature ==
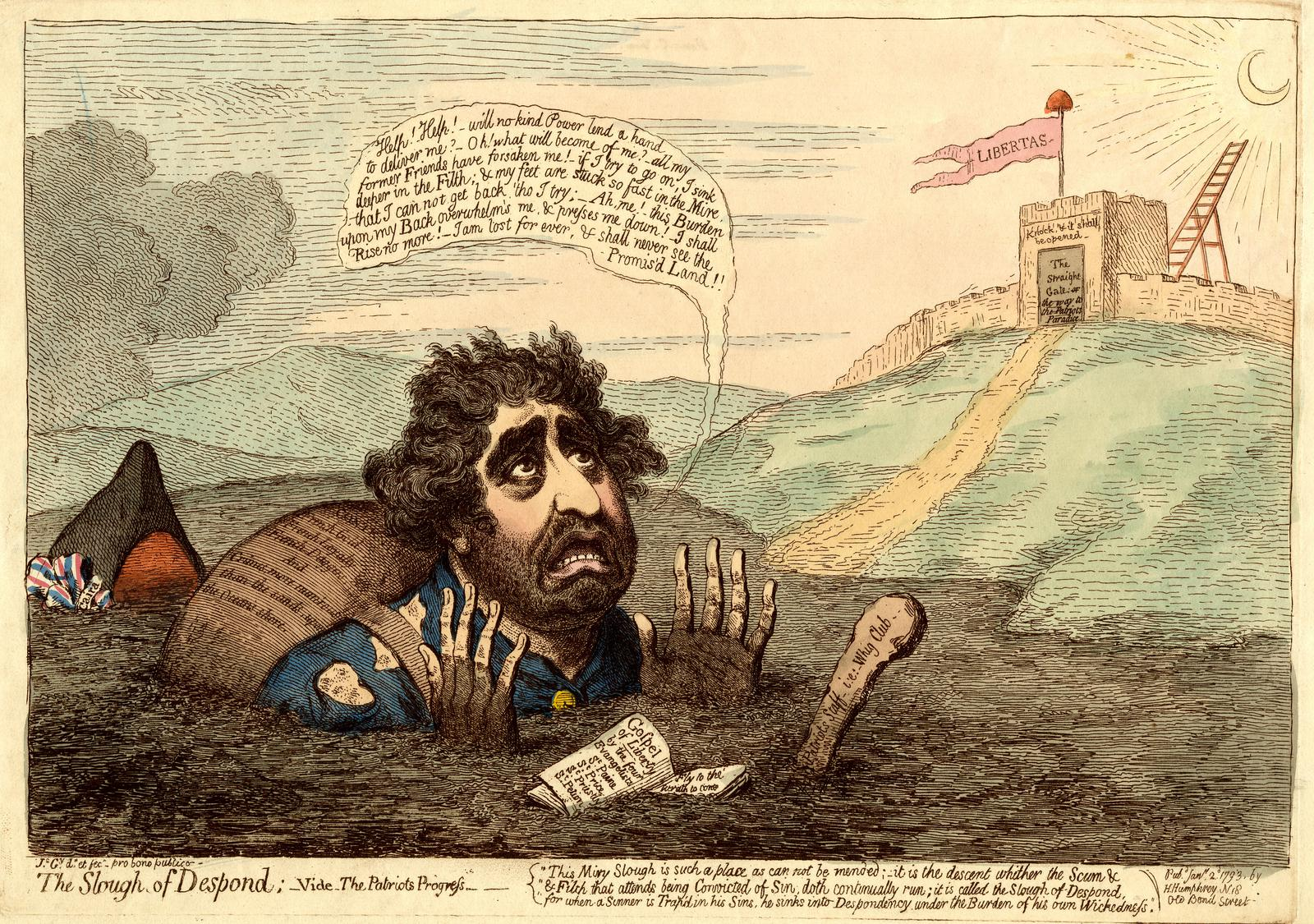
Satirical illustration by James Gillray (1793) of politician Charles James Fox in the Slough of Despond

This phrase has been referred to frequently in subsequent literature. Nathaniel Hawthorne's tale The Celestial Railroad is a satirical contrast between Bunyan's The Pilgrim's Progress and Hawthorne's perception of the current state of society. In Emily Brontë's Wuthering Heights the character Mr. Heathcliff likens his son's state of melancholy to having been dropped "into a Slough of Despond". In George Gissing's New Grub Street, Milvain expresses concern for his friend Reardon's mental health, "His friends should exert themselves to raise him out of this fearful slough of despond". Friedrich Engels in his preface of 1886 to the English edition of Das Kapital, Volume I wrote "The decennial cycle of stagnation, prosperity, over-production and crisis, ..., seems indeed to have run its course; but only to land us in the slough of despond of a permanent and chronic depression." In Horatio Hornblower: The Even Chance, by C. S. Forester, Midshipman Archie Kennedy describes Hornblower's new home as "His Majesty's ship of the line Justinian, known elsewise among her intimates as the good ship Slough of Despond." In Mary McCarthy's novel The Group (1954), "Kay saw that [her husband, Harald] was sinking into a Slough of Despond (as they termed his sudden, Scandinavian fits of depression)".

In Michael Ende's novel The Neverending Story (1979) there's a place in Fantastica called The Swamps of Sadness. It's a desolate marshland filled with muddy pits resembling quicksand. If one falls into despair while there, they sink deeper into sadness until they are overwhelmed and drowned by it.

In J.D. Peabody's children's fantasy novel, Operation Bungaree (2024) there is a chapter entitled "A Slog through a Bog." The protagonist, Everett Drake, finds himself mired in a substance called Inkanto while he wrestles with doubts and discouragement.

W. Somerset Maugham alludes to the Slough in his book Of Human Bondage, where in a letter to the protagonist, Philip Carey, the failed poet Cronshaw details that he has "hopelessly immersed [himself ... in] the Slough of Despond," referring to his poverty. In Gerald Brom's novel, The Child Thief, The Slough is a passage of terror into the world Avalon, which Peter must travel through. In John Steinbeck's novel, Sweet Thursday (1954), Mack describes Doc's melancholic condition in suggesting that his fellow denizens of the Palace Flophouse help him out, using a punning conflation of slang and Bunyan: "Gentlemen [...] let us highly resolve to get Doc's ass out of the sling of despond" (79). In Harlan Ellison's short story "I Have No Mouth, and I Must Scream" (1967), the last five surviving humans are tortured by a godlike artificial intelligence named AM. The narrator relates how, among other harrowing experiences, "We passed through the Slough of Despond." In Louisa May Alcott's Hospital Sketches, a grateful Tribulation Periwinkle remarks that she feels "as did poor Christian [...] on the safe side of the Slough of Despond", and in her novel Jo's Boys, the titular character Jo's son Ted is said to be prone to "moods of gloom, and [falls] into the Slough of Despond about once a week". In Charles Portis's memoir Combinations of Jacksons (1999), he observes that his local dark marsh where he frolicked as a boy wasn't big enough or distinctive enough to have a proper name such as the Slough of Despond, sadly it was just "the slew". In J. G. Farrell's Booker Prize winner, The Siege of Krishnapur (1973), the haunted Padre refers to a particularly dangerous crossing thus:

The Padre was looking more haggard and wild-eyed than ever. He had thought that he would never be able to reach the banqueting hall because he had had to cross the stretch of open lawn swept by musket fire and grape which lay between the Church and the hall and which he had thought of as the Slough of Despond.

== Allusions in placenames ==
- An area of wetlands in Canada located on the Bruce Trail near Big Bay, Ontario, north of Owen Sound is named after this fictional place.
- A quarry site near Symington in South Ayrshire has the Slough Burn flowing through it and on Ordnance Survey maps is marked as the Slough of Despond.

== In other media ==
Mentioned in City and Colour's 2011 song "Northern Wind" from the album Little Hell:

I'm the darkest hour
just before the dawn
I'm slowly sinking
into the Slough of Despond

It is also mentioned in Cradle of Filth's 2010 song "Beyond Eleventh Hour", contained on the album Darkly, Darkly, Venus Aversa:

Part of the garden, her dark Eden
Fed Turkish Delights by poisoned fronds
My heart hardened in her wet season
Treading mud in her slough of despond
