= Hinds' Feet on High Places =

1955 novel by Hannah Hurnard

- 1973 edition (Bantam Books)
- Author: Hannah Hurnard
- Language: English
- Genre: Christian
- Publisher: Christian Literature Crusade
- Publication date: 1955
- Publication place: United Kingdom
- Media type: Print (Hardback & Paperback)
- Pages: 158
- ISBN: 0-86065-192-4

Hinds' Feet on High Places is an allegorical novel by English author Hannah Hurnard. Hinds' Feet was written in 1955 and has become a very successful work of Christian fiction, seeing new editions published as recently as July, 2005.

== Plot introduction ==
It is the story of a young woman named Much Afraid, and her journey away from her Fearing family and into the High Places of the Shepherd, guided by her two companions Sorrow and Suffering. It is an allegory of a Christian devotional life from salvation through maturity. It aims to show how a Christian is transformed from unbeliever to immature believer to mature believer, who walks daily with God as easily on the High Places of Joy in the spirit as in the daily life of mundane and often humiliating tasks that may cause Christians to lose perspective.

The book takes its title from Habakkuk 3:19, "The Lord God is my strength, and he will make my feet like hinds' feet, and he will make me to walk upon mine high places."

The story begins at the Valley of Humiliation with Much Afraid, being beset by the unwanted advances of her cousin, Craven Fear, who wishes to marry her. Much Afraid is ugly from all outward appearances, walking on club feet, sporting gnarled, deformed hands, and speaking from a crooked mouth that seems to have been made so by a stroke or the like.

The Good Shepherd is tender and gentle with Much Afraid, especially in the beginning. However, His many sudden departures may strike the reader as bizarre, given the human penchant to expect kindly souls to never do anything that may be interpreted as rude or as hurtful in any way. Yet, though the Shepherd leaves in a moment, He returns the same way at the first furtive cry of the forlorn little protagonist. "Come, Shepherd, for I am much afraid!"

When Much Afraid intimates that she would love to be able to dance upon the high places as do the sure-footed deer, the Shepherd commends her for this desire. In order to accomplish this, he offers to "plant the seed of love" into her heart. At first sight of the long, black hawthorn-looking seed, she shrieks in fear. Soon, she relents, and after the initial intense pain, she senses that something is indeed different in her, though she still looks the same, for now.

Just when the reader thinks that Much Afraid is about to reach the High Places, the path turns downward towards a seemingly endless desert. There is incident with an extremely high cliff that must be ascended by a steep, slippery and very narrow zig-zagging track, with the help of her two companions, Sorrow and Suffering. Then days are spent in a forest that is shrouded in a thick cloud of fog. During this time Much Afraid is sequestered with her two friends in a log cabin. The climax is an unexpected twist that comes as Much Afraid despairs of ever reaching the High Places.

== Allusions/references to other works ==
The book bears some stylistic similarities to John Bunyan's The Pilgrim's Progress. The name of the protagonist, Much-Afraid, also appears first in Bunyan's work.
