= Saco City Hall =

- U.S. National Register of Historic Places
- U.S. Historic district – Contributing property
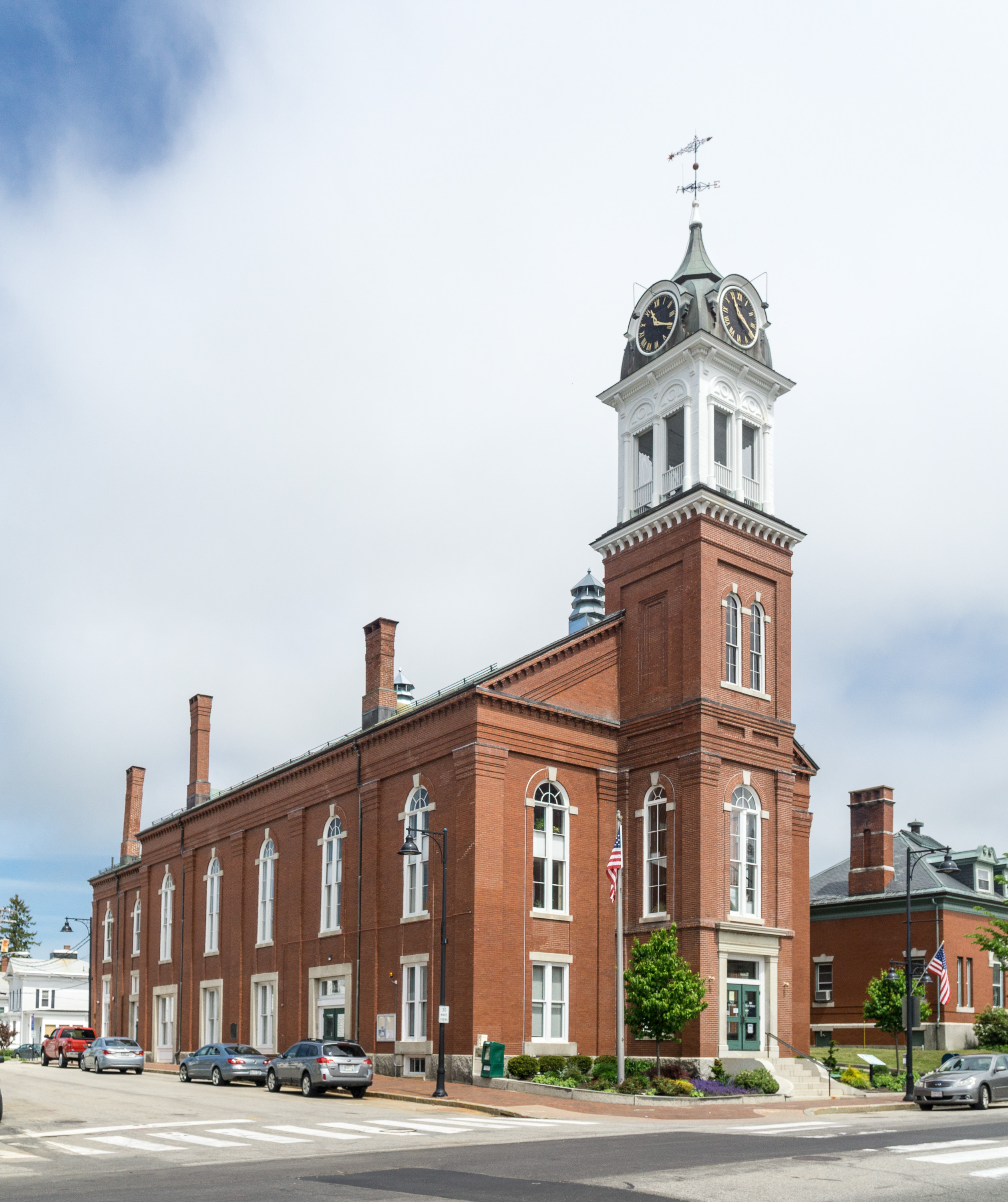

- Location within Maine Location within the United States
- Location: 300 Main St., Saco, Maine
- Coordinates: 43°29′57″N 70°26′44″W
- Area: 0.3 acres (0.12 ha)
- Built: 1855
- Built by: Abraham and Barnabus Cutter
- Architect: Hill, Thomas
- Architectural style: Greek Revival, Italianate
- Part of: Saco Historic District (ID98000594)
- NRHP reference No.: 79000192

Significant dates
- Added to NRHP: October 9, 1979
- Designated CP: June 12, 1998

Saco City Hall is located at 300 Main Street in downtown Saco, Maine. It is a transitional Greek Revival-Italianate brick building, designed by Thomas Hill and built in 1855. It was listed on the National Register of Historic Places in 1979.

== Architecture and history ==
Saco City Hall is located on the west side of Main Street (Maine State Route 9), at the corner of Cutts Avenue in the city's central business district. It is a two-story brick structure, with a front-facing gable roof and a square tower prominently projecting from its front facade. The building's corners and bays are articulated by brick pilasters. First floor windows are rectangular sash, with stone lintels and sills, while second floor windows are tall and narrow paired windows, with keystoned semicircular arched windows above. The main entrance is in the front of the tower, which rises a full three stories to an ornate wooden belfry, above which is a four-sided cupola in which clock faces have been set.

The town of Saco (reincorporated as a city in 1867) experienced rapid growth during the second quarter of the 19th century, doubling in population between 1830 and 1860, fueled by industrial development. This growth prompted the need for a larger space to hold town meetings, which had until then been held either at the old meeting house or congregational church vestry. The present building was constructed in 1855 to a design by Thomas Hill, a local carpenter. Hill oversaw the building's construction, whose masonry work was done by Abraham and Barnabus Cutter.

== See also ==
- National Register of Historic Places listings in York County, Maine
