= Slice the Cake =

International deathcore band

- Genres: Progressive metal; deathcore; metalcore; technical death metal
- Years active: 2010–2016, 2019–2022
- Past members: Jonas Johansson; Gareth Mason; Jack Richardson

Slice the Cake was an international progressive deathcore band. Formed in 2009, it consisted of members from England, Sweden, and Australia. They broke up in 2016 due to disputes between vocalist Gareth Mason and composer Jack "Magero" Richardson. The band reformed in 2019, then broke up for a second time in 2022. Their last studio album, Odyssey to the West, was critically acclaimed. Richardson died from lung cancer on May 26, 2024.

== Discography ==
Studio albums

- The Man With No Face (2012)
- Other Slices (2012)
- Odyssey to the West (2016)

Other

- Cleansed (EP, 2010)
- Odyssey to the Gallows (EP, 2016)
- Live at Home (live album, 2020)

== Band members ==
Final line-up

- Gareth Mason - lead vocals, synthesizer (2009-2016, 2019-2022)
- Jonas Johansson - guitar, bass, programming, backing vocals (2009-2016, 2019-2022)
- Jack "Magero" Richardson - bass, compositions, orchestrations, programming (2009-2016, 2019-2022)
