= The Great Adventure (The Neal Morse Band album) =

Studio album by The Neal Morse Band
- Released: January 25, 2019
- Recorded: August 2017 – August 2018
- Studio: Neal Morse personal studio in Nashville, Tennessee
- Genre: Progressive rock, Progressive metal
- Length: 103:38
- Label: Metal Blade; Radiant Records

The Neal Morse Band chronology
The Similitude of a Dream (2016)	The Great Adventure (2019)	Innocence & Danger (2021)

Singles from The Great Adventure
- 1. "Welcome to the World" Released: December 4, 2018; 2. "The Great Adventure" Released: December 18, 2018; 3. "Welcome to the World 2" Released: January 10, 2019; 4. "Vanity Fair" Released: January 17, 2019; 5. "I Got to Run" Released: January 25, 2019; 6. "The Great Despair" Released: March 26, 2019

Neal Morse solo chronology
Life & Times (2018)	The Great Adventure (2019)	Jesus Christ the Exorcist (2019)

The Great Adventure is the third studio album by American progressive rock supergroup The Neal Morse Band, released on January 25, 2019 via Metal Blade Records and Radiant Records.

A concept album, it is a sequel to 2016's The Similitude of a Dream and both are loosely based on The Pilgrim's Progress by John Bunyan, besides having similar covers. This album follows the protagonist's family as they journey to Celestial City to join him. It is divided in five chapters, each ranging from 13 to 31 minutes long and involving from 2 to 6 songs, some of them evoking earlier melodies or preluding future ones.

The album's first and third singles, "Welcome to the World" and "I Got to Run", premiered on Prog's website on December 8, 2018 and January 24, 2019, respectively. The second single, "Vanity Fair", was released with a lyric video on January 18, 2019. Videos for the title track and for "Welcome to the World 2" were released on December 18, 2018 and January 11, 2019, respectively.

The album was released as a two-CD package, a special edition with a bonus DVD featuring behind-the-scenes/making of videos, and as a triple vinyl version.

== Background and writing ==
Well, it's more of a different view of The Similitude of a Dream. It's the journey of the abandoned son who was left behind in TSOAD. After the guy who is left behind has a vision, he tries to convince his wife to join him, but she won't. So, he takes to the trip on his own. It's based on The Pilgrim's Progress book which tells her story. Lyrically, it didn't work for us to tell the story from her perspective, so I thought, 'Why not sing from the perspective of the eldest son who was angry to be left in the city of destruction?'

— Neal Morse when asked if The Great Adventure was a continuation of The Similitude of a Dream.

Morse was not willing to create a sequel to The Similitude of a Dream at first, and neither was the band. Members were also against creating another double album. The quintet got together in August 2017 and then in January 2018 to perform some songs. Later in 2018, as Morse toured his solo album Life and Times, he revisited the recordings and used Pro Tools to work on the songs, ultimately creating a 2.5-hour version of the original album, which was well received by the band.

Morse says there are "three or even four" versions of the album recorded as demos and that the record spent 18 months in the making. The final cut of the effort was finished in August 2018, when a 2.5 hour version of it was shortened to just under two hours. Many songs and parts had to be cut, with Morse commenting that "everybody lost something that they loved on this album. And everybody gained." The band barely made it in time for a January 2019 release. Some songs, such as the closing track "A Love That Never Dies" and "Vanity Fair", had been written long before the sessions.

The album's title was suggested by drummer and vocalist Mike Portnoy, based on the last line of The Similitude of a Dream, which says "let the great adventure now begin".

== Critical reception ==
Professional ratings
Review scores
Source	Rating
Jesus Wired	96%
Sea of Tranquility	5/5 stars
Sonic Perspectives	9.3/10

Writing for Jesus Wired, David C. Coleman said "the members of the band musically complement each other to an extraordinary degree, creating a whole far greater than the individual parts" and pondered that "overall, The Great Adventure is not quite as earth-shattering as the career-defining The Similitude of a Dream but it's still a remarkable accomplishment and fitting conclusion for the tale of The Pilgrim's Progress.

On Sea of Tranquility, Pete Pardo said the album is "perhaps even more proggy and certainly heavier" than The Similitude of a Dream. He praised all members' performances and finished his review by saying "while it's no doubt a little early yet to make any claims [about the album being better than its predecessor], The Great Adventure easily comes pretty damn close."

Scott Medina from Sonic Perspectives said that "sonically, the band has never sounded better. The production is flawless" and that "the collective known as The Neal Morse Band rises to the formidable task of matching their most celebrated work, The Similitude of a Dream, proving they continue to grow and heighten the quality of their musical output."

PopMatters ranked it as the eighth best progressive rock/metal release of 2019.

== Track listing ==
=== Act I (CD 1) ===
Chapter 1
No.	Title	Length
1.	"Overture"	10:06
2.	"The Dream Isn't Over"	2:40
Total length:		12:46

Chapter 2
No.	Title	Length
3.	"Welcome to the World"	5:30
4.	"A Momentary Change"	3:42
5.	"Dark Melody"	3:29
6.	"I Got to Run"	6:05
7.	"To the River"	5:02
Total length:		23:48

Chapter 3
No.	Title	Length
8.	"The Great Adventure"	6:06
9.	"Venture in Black"	5:16
10.	"Hey Ho Let's Go"	3:22
11.	"Beyond the Borders"	3:08
Total length:		17:52

=== Act II (CD 2) ===
Chapter 4
No.	Title	Length
1.	"Overture 2"	3:46
2.	"Long Ago"	3:45
3.	"The Dream Continues"	1:20
4.	"Fighting with Destiny"	5:23
5.	"Vanity Fair"	4:00
Total length:		18:15

Chapter 5
No.	Title	Length
6.	"Welcome to the World 2"	4:01
7.	"The Element of Fear"	2:34
8.	"Child of Wonder"	2:28
9.	"The Great Despair"	6:18
10.	"Freedom Calling"	7:31
11.	"A Love That Never Dies"	8:38
Total length:		31:30

== Personnel ==
The Neal Morse Band

- Neal Morse – lead vocals, keyboards, guitars
- Eric Gillette – guitars, lead vocals
- Mike Portnoy – drums, vocals
- Randy George – bass
- Bill Hubauer – organ, piano, synthesizers, lead vocals

Additional musicians

- Amy Pippin, Debbie Bresee, April Zachary, Julie Harrison – backing vocals on "A Love That Never Dies"
- Chris Carmichael – strings

Technical personnel

- Rich Mouser – mixing
- Jerry Guidroz – drum engineer

== Charts ==
Chart performance for The Great Adventure
Chart (2019)	Peak position
Austrian Albums (Ö3 Austria)	39
Belgian Albums (Ultratop Flanders)	181
Dutch Albums (Album Top 100)	36
German Albums (Offizielle Top 100)	9
Swiss Albums (Schweizer Hitparade)	14
US Independent Albums (Billboard)	12
