= Hannah Hurnard =

English-Israeli Christian author (1905–1990)

Hannah Hurnard (1905–1990) was a 20th-century Christian author, best known for her allegorical novel, Hinds' Feet on High Places.

== Biography ==
Hurnard was born in 1905 in Colchester, England, to Quaker parents. She graduated from Ridgelands Bible College in 1926. In 1932 she became an independent missionary, moving to Haifa, in what was then Palestine, but now Israel. Her work in Palestine and later Israel lasted 50 years, although she later maintained a home in England as well.

Hurnard's early writings (especially Hinds' Feet on High Places and the sequel Mountain of Spices) were embraced by the mainstream Christian community. Later on in her life critics noticed a departure from orthodoxy theology. As the archivists of her papers at Wheaton College wrote, "Critics believed her later works to exhibit an unorthodox universalism. ... Her theological metamorphosis isolated her from her mainstream readers." Eagles' Wings to the Higher Places has been said to support unorthodox beliefs in pantheism, universalism, and gnosticism. Unveiled Glory tells of how she came to believe in Universal reconciliation.

"Mountains of Spices,” an allegorical Christian story, compares the nine spices or fragrant oils listed in the Song of Solomon, Chapter 4:13–14 to the nine fruits of the Spirit mentioned in Galatian 5: 22–23. Each spice or fragrant oil, represented by one of nine sacred mountains, parallels a fruit of the spirit. Led by the Great Shepherd, seekers journey into the mountains to learn about the precious spices and to receive the transformative Seed of Love in their hearts.

== Selected bibliography ==
- Hinds' Feet on High Places
- Mountains of Spices published 1977 (Wheaton, Ill: Tyndale).
- God's Transmitters
- Hearing Heart
- Fruitarianism: Compassionate Way To Transform Health
- Garden of the Lord
- Kingdom of Love
- Wayfarer in the Land
- Winged Life
- Walking Among the Unseen
- Eagles' Wings to the Higher Places
- Watchmen on the Walls
- Steps to the Kingdom
- Thou Shalt Remember: Lessons of a Lifetime
- The Unveiled Glory
- The Way of Healing
- The Inner Man
- The Opened Understanding
- The Heavenly Powers
- The Mystery of Suffering
- The Secrets of the Kingdom
