= Thacher-Goodale House =

Historic house in Maine, United States

- U.S. National Register of Historic Places
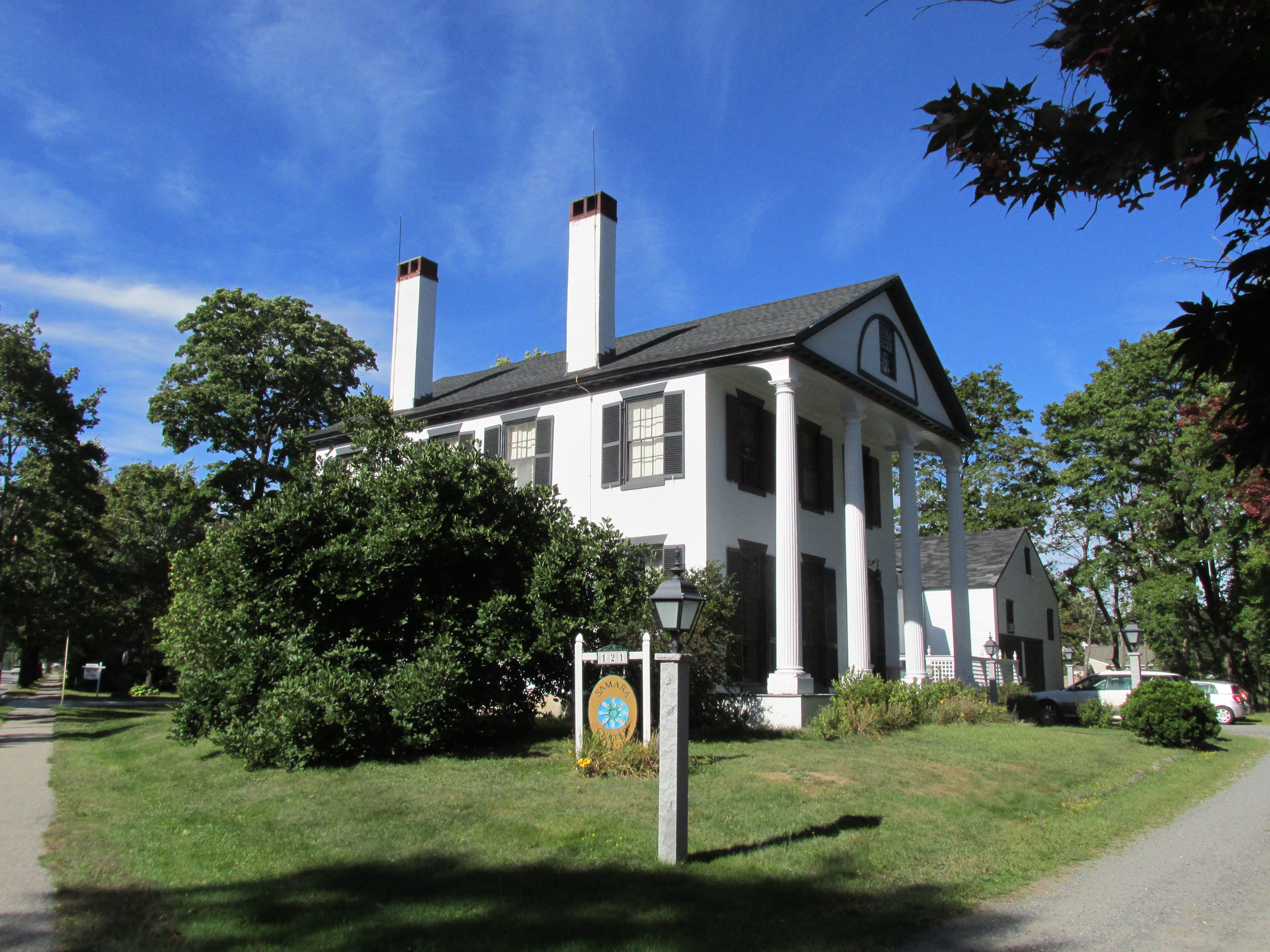

- Location within Maine Location within the United States
- Location: 121 North St., Saco, Maine
- Coordinates: 43°30′19″N 70°26′47″W
- Area: 2 acres (0.81 ha)
- Built: 1827
- Architectural style: Greek Revival, Federal
- NRHP reference No.: 76000193
- Added to NRHP: November 21, 1976

The Thacher-Goodale House is a historic house at 121 North Street in Saco, Maine. Built in 1827, it is a sophisticated early expression of Greek Revival architecture, retaining significant Federal period details. Built for George Thacher, Jr., a lawyer, it was owned for many years by members of the Goodale family, most notably the botanist George Lincoln Goodale. The house was listed on the National Register of Historic Places in 1976.

== Description and history ==
The Thacher-Goodale House is located in a predominantly residential area north of downtown Saco, on the east side of North Street (Maine State Route 112) just south of its junction with Maine State Route 5. It is a 2 1/2-story brick structure, with a front (south-facing) gable roof. The front facade is dominated by a two-story Greek temple front, with narrow Doric columns supporting a fully pedimented gable with a sash window in its center. The street-facing left side of the house is four bays long, all sash windows. The main entrance is set in the rightmost bay on the front, with flanking sidelights and a Federal-style fan above. An ell extends to the right of the main block.

The house was built in 1827–28 for George Thacher, Jr., son of George Thacher, one of Maine's first Maine Supreme Judicial Court justices. Thacher sold the house in 1841 to Stephen L. Goodale, a businessman and horticulturalist who served as Maine's Secretary of Agrictulture. Goodale's son, George Lincoln Goodale, was born here, and also became a noted botanist, with appointments at Bowdoin College and Harvard University. It was during his tenure at Harvard that the university, through his efforts, acquired the unique glass flower collection on display at its Museum of Natural History.

== See also ==
- National Register of Historic Places listings in York County, Maine
