= Odyssey to the West =

Studio album by Slice the Cake
- Released: April 1, 2016
- Recorded: 2014–2016
- Genre: Progressive metal; technical death metal; deathcore; avant-garde metal; spoken word
- Length: 77:17
- Label: Self-released

Slice the Cake chronology
| Odyssey to the Gallows (2016) | Odyssey to the West (2016) |

Singles from Odyssey to the West
- 1. "Stone and Silver Part I - The Mountains of Man" Released: 1 March 2015.; 2. "The Exile Part II - The City of Destruction" Released: 22 May 2015

Professional ratings
Review scores
| Source | Rating |
|---|---|
| Heavy Blog is Heavy | 4.5/5 stars |
| thecirclepit.com | 10/10 |

Odyssey to the West is the third and final studio album by international progressive deathcore trio Slice the Cake. It was self-released on April 1, 2016. It was released simultaneously with Odyssey to the Gallows. Both releases are part of a concept about a pilgrim who leaves his betrothed to find God.

Shortly after the album was released, the band disbanded due to it being released without composer Jack Richardson's permission. Slice the Cake later regrouped, releasing a live EP in 2020 that featured tracks from Odyssey to the West.

== Track listing ==
All tracks are written by Slice the Cake.

| No. | Title | Length |
|---|---|---|
| 1. | "The Exile: 1. "The Razor's Edge" (4:14); 2. "The City of Destruction" (5:24); " | 9:38 |
| 2. | "Stone and Silver: 1. "The Mountains of Man" (8:16); 2. "The Horned God" (2:32); 3. "The Man of Papyrus Limbs" (5:44); " | 16:32 |
| 3. | "Westward Bound: 1. "The Lantern" (6:15); 2. "The Pilgrim's Progress" (4:04); " | 10:19 |
| 4. | "Castle in the Sky Part II - Pieces of Ruins" | 4:50 |
| 5. | "Unending Waltz" | 5:16 |
| 6. | "Ash and Rust: 1. "From Shell to Shell"(2:22); 2. "The Dark Carnival" (6:10); 3. "The Torn Thread" (5:03); 4. "Nameless, Faceless" (2:50); " | 16:25 |
| 7. | "Destiny's Fool" | 5:34 |
| 8. | "The Holy Mountain" | 8:35 |
| Total length: | | 1:17:17 |

== Personnel ==
=== Slice the Cake ===
- Gareth Mason – lead vocals, words, concept, synthesizer, djembe.
- Jonas Johansson – guitars, bass, backing vocals, programing, production, artwork
- Jack "Magero" Richardson – compositions, orchestral arrangements, musical thematics

=== Additional staff ===
- Jake Lowe – compositions, guest guitar solo on track 3
- Michael Malyan - piano on track 8
- Simon Longe - additional drum composition
- JJ Polacheck - guest vox on track 4
- Laura Vine - guest vox on track 9
- Sol Sinclair - choral vox
- Galen Stapley - choral vox
- Dan Luces - additional vocal editing on all tracks
- Dylan Garrett Smith - artwork, layout and design for "Odyssey to the Gallows"
