= J. G. Deering House =

Historic house in Maine, United States

- U.S. National Register of Historic Places
- U.S. Historic district – Contributing property
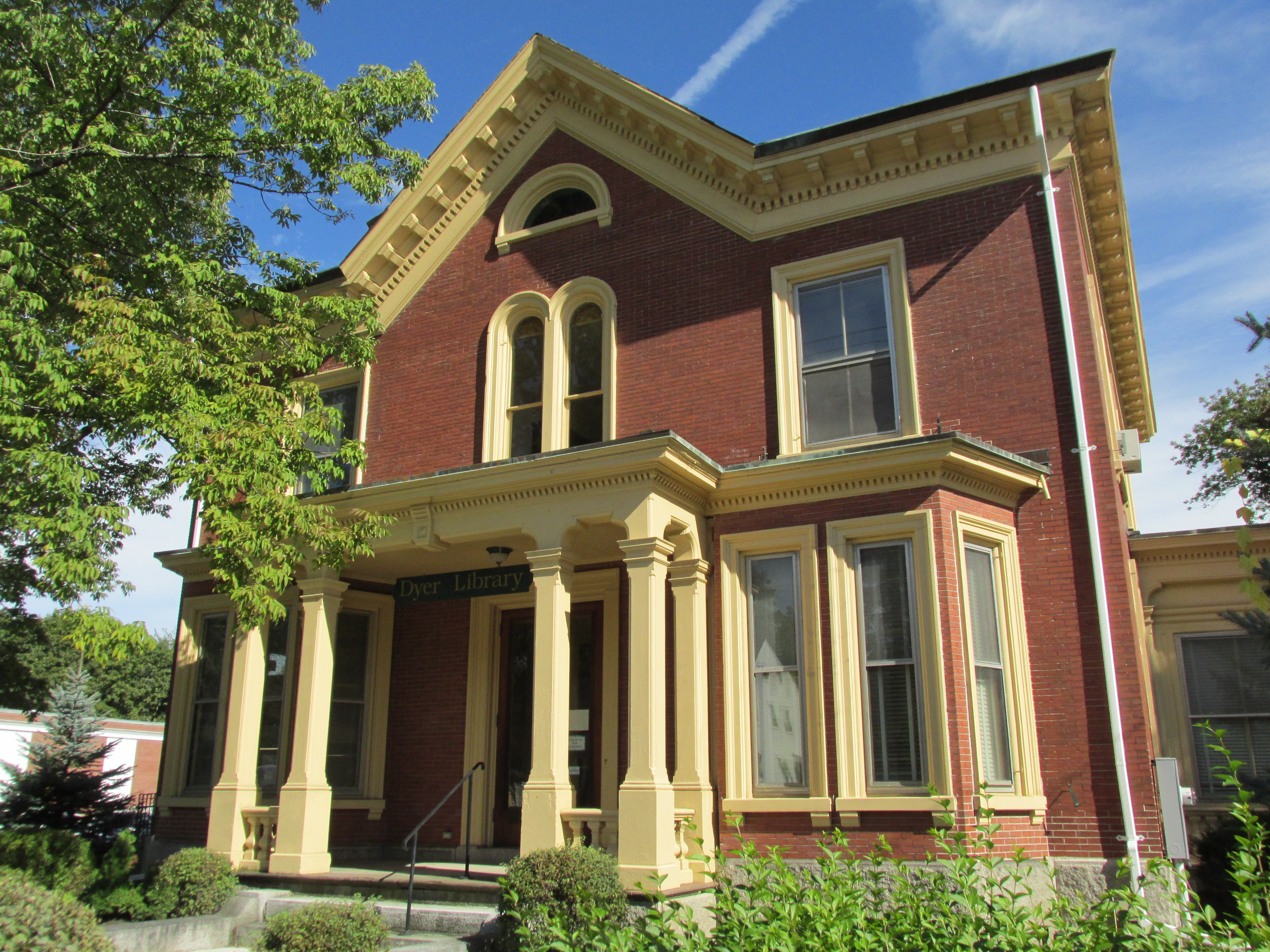
- Deering House in 2013

- Location within Maine Location within the United States
- Location: 371 Main Street, Saco, Maine
- Coordinates: 43°30′05″N 70°26′32″W
- Area: 0.5 acres (0.20 ha)
- Built: 1870
- Architectural style: Italianate
- Part of: Saco Historic District (ID98000594)
- NRHP reference No.: 82000793

Significant dates
- Added to NRHP: February 17, 1982
- Designated: February 17, 1982
- Designated CP: June 12, 1998

The J. G. Deering House, also known as the Dyer Library/Saco Museum, is an historic house at 371 Main Street in Saco, Maine. Completed in 1870, it is a fine local example of Italianate style. Built for Joseph Godfrey Deering, it was given by his heirs to the city for use as a library. It was listed on the National Register of Historic Places in 1982.

== Architecture and history ==
The Deering House is located on the south side of United States Route 1, a short way north of Saco's central business district. It is a 2 1/2-story brick structure, with limestone and wooden trim elements. It has a side-gable roof with a denticulated and bracketed cornice, with a front-facing gable above the centered entrance. The main facade is three bays wide, with the entrance sheltered by a wide single-story flat-roof porch supported by square columns. Above the entrance are paired round-arch windows, with a half-round window in the gable above. The entrance is flanked by three-side bays, with single sash windows above. A two-story ell extends to the rear, and is further extended by a single-story ell which joins the house to a period carriage house. To the north of the house stands the 1 1/2-story brick complex of the former York Institute.

The house was built in 1869–70 by Joseph Godfrey Deering, who began in business as a grocer, but got involved in the lumber industry, creating one of Maine's largest lumber companies. This house was supposedly the first in York County to have running water and indoor toilets. Deering's heirs undertook a series of extensions and alterations to the property, hiring architects John Calvin Stevens and Joseph Stickney to design them. Deering heirs gave the house to the city in 1955 for use as a library. The Dyer Library built the ell connecting the house to the carriage house. The library merged with the adjacent York Institute in 1976 to form the organization now known as Dyer Library/Saco Museum.

== See also ==
- National Register of Historic Places listings in York County, Maine
