= Frampton Comes Alive! =

Live album by Peter Frampton
- Released: 15 January 1976 (US)
- Recorded: 13–14 June, 24 August and 22 November 1975
- Venues: Marin Veterans Memorial Auditorium, San Rafael, California; Winterland Ballroom, San Francisco, California; Long Island Arena, Commack, New York; SUNY Plattsburgh, Plattsburgh, New York
- Genre: Rock
- Length: 78:06 (original album); 98:03 (2001 expanded and remastered edition)
- Label: A&M
- Producer: Peter Frampton

Peter Frampton chronology
| Frampton (1975) | Frampton Comes Alive! (1976) | I'm in You (1977) |

Singles from Frampton Comes Alive!
- 1. "Show Me the Way" Released: February 1976; 2. "Baby, I Love Your Way" Released: June 1976; 3. "Do You Feel Like We Do" Released: September 1976

Professional ratings
Review scores
| Source | Rating |
|---|---|
| AllMusic | 4.5/5 stars |
| Christgau's Record Guide | B− |
| The Encyclopedia of Popular Music | 4/5 stars |

Frampton Comes Alive! is a double live album by the English musician and songwriter Peter Frampton, released in 1976 by A&M Records. Following four studio albums with little success and sales, Frampton Comes Alive! was a breakthrough for Frampton and is one of the best-selling live albums ever. "Show Me the Way", "Baby, I Love Your Way", and "Do You Feel Like We Do" were released as singles; all three reached the top 10 in Canada and the top 15 on the US Billboard Hot 100, and frequently receive airplay on classic rock radio stations.

Released on 15 January 1976, Frampton Comes Alive! debuted on the charts at No. 191. It reached No. 1 on the Billboard 200 the week ending 10 April 1976, spending 10 non-consecutive weeks in the top spot through October. It was the best-selling album of 1976 and has sold over 8 million copies in the United States.

Frampton Comes Alive! was voted "Album of the Year" in a 1976 Rolling Stone readers' poll. It stayed on the chart for 97 weeks and was still No. 14 on Billboard's 1977 year-end album chart. It was ranked No. 41 on Rolling Stone's "50 Greatest Live Albums of All Time" list. Readers of Rolling Stone ranked it No. 3 in a 2012 poll of all-time favourite live albums.

In 2020, Frampton Comes Alive! was inducted into the Grammy Hall of Fame.

== Background and recording ==
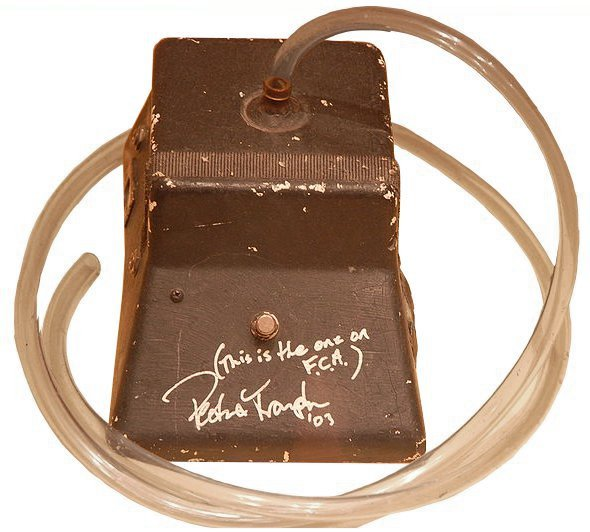
Talk box used during the album's recording.

The album Frampton Comes Alive! was recorded between June and November 1975, primarily at the Winterland Ballroom in San Francisco as well as Marin Veterans' Memorial Auditorium in San Rafael, California, Long Island Arena in Commack, New York, and a concert on the SUNY Plattsburgh campus in Plattsburgh, New York. The Winterland songs were recorded on a 24-track recorder. Other concerts were captured on 16-track recorders. Recordings from four shows were used for the original album. Master tapes were recorded at 15 inches per second using professional Dolby "A" noise reduction.

The live album had been intended to be a single LP disc, but at the suggestion of A&M Records, additional shows were recorded, and the album expanded to two LPs for release. On the special features for the Live in Detroit concert DVD, Frampton commented that some difficulties were encountered in mixing after the cable to the bass drum microphone was inadvertently pulled, causing the microphone to face at a 90-degree angle from the drumhead. During the concerts, Frampton principally used a distinctive modified black 1954 Gibson Les Paul Custom electric guitar (with three Humbucker pick-ups as opposed to the usual P90 and AlNiCo Staple pickups). On the radio program In the Studio with Redbeard, Frampton said, "The album is mostly live except for the first verse of "Something's Happening", the electric rhythm guitar on "Show Me the Way" (the talk-box came out but the engineer forgot to move the mic) and the intro piano on "I Wanna Go to the Sun" were fixed in the studio but the rest was all live (all the guitar solos, acoustic guitars, electric keyboards, drums, bass guitar and rest of vocals)".

== Release ==
The double album was released in the U.S. at a reduced list price of $7.98, only $1.00 more than the standard $6.98 of most single-disc albums in 1976. It was pressed in "automatic sequence", with sides one and four on one record and sides two and three on the other. This arrangement facilitated sequential listening on automatic record changers.

The album produced three hit singles: "Baby, I Love Your Way", "Do You Feel Like We Do", and "Show Me the Way". The talk box guitar effect became closely associated with Frampton due to its use in the latter two singles. The single version of "Do You Feel Like We Do" was edited to 7:19 from the original 14:15 album version, making it one of the longest singles to reach the top 40, surpassing The Beatles' "Hey Jude" at 7:11. The B-side of "Do You Feel Like We Do", the acoustic instrumental "Penny for Your Thoughts", was the shortest track on Frampton Comes Alive, at 1:23.

In January 2001, a 25th Anniversary Deluxe Edition of the album was released. It featured four additional tracks not present in the original version, one recorded in a radio studio and not part of the main concert program. The track sequence was revised to more accurately reflect the original concert set list. Frampton produced the remixed and extended album and performed live with the original band at Tower Records in Los Angeles to promote the release.

== Track listing ==
All songs written by Peter Frampton except as noted. Durations are sourced from original LP release.

Side one
| No. | Title | Writer(s) | Original album | Length |
|---|---|---|---|---|
| 1. | "Introduction/Something's Happening" | | Somethin's Happening (1974) | 5:54 |
| 2. | "Doobie Wah" | Frampton, John Headley-Down, Rick Wills | Somethin's Happening (1974) | 5:28 |
| 3. | "Show Me the Way" | | Frampton (1975) | 4:32 |
| 4. | "It's a Plain Shame" | | Wind of Change (1972) | 4:21 |

Side two
| No. | Title | Original album | Length |
|---|---|---|---|
| 1. | "All I Want to Be (Is by Your Side)" | Wind of Change (1972) | 3:27 |
| 2. | "Wind of Change" | Wind of Change (1972) | 2:47 |
| 3. | "Baby, I Love Your Way" | Frampton (1975) | 4:43 |
| 4. | "I Wanna Go to the Sun" | Somethin's Happening (1974) | 7:02 |

Side three
| No. | Title | Writer(s) | Original album | Length |
|---|---|---|---|---|
| 1. | "Penny for Your Thoughts" | | Frampton (1975) | 1:23 |
| 2. | "(I'll Give You) Money" | | Frampton (1975) | 5:39 |
| 3. | "Shine On" | | Rock On (1971) | 3:35 |
| 4. | "Jumpin' Jack Flash" | Mick Jagger, Keith Richards | Wind of Change (1972) | 7:45 |

Side four
| No. | Title | Writer(s) | Original album | Length |
|---|---|---|---|---|
| 1. | "Lines on My Face" | | Frampton's Camel (1973) | 7:06 |
| 2. | "Do You Feel Like We Do" | Frampton, Mick Gallagher, John Siomos, Rick Wills | Frampton's Camel (1973) | 14:15 |

=== 25th anniversary deluxe edition ===
Disc one

1. "Introduction/Something's Happening" – 5:56 (Originally titled "Baby (Somethin's Happening)" on Frampton's 1974 album Somethin's Happening)
2. "Doobie Wah" (Frampton, Rick Wills, John Headley-Down) – 5:43
3. "Lines on My Face" – 6:59
4. "Show Me the Way" – 4:32
5. "It's a Plain Shame" – 4:03
6. "Wind of Change" – 2:57
7. "Just the Time of Year" – 4:21 *
8. "Penny for Your Thoughts" – 1:34
9. "All I Want to Be (Is By Your Side)" – 3:08
10. "Baby, I Love Your Way" – 4:41
11. "I Want to Go to the Sun" – 7:15

Disc two

1. "Nowhere's Too Far (For My Baby)" – 4:49 *
2. "(I'll Give You) Money" – 5:46
3. "Do You Feel Like We Do" (SUNY-Plattsburgh, Plattsburgh, NY, 22 November 1975) (Frampton, Mick Gallagher, John Siomos, Wills) – 13:46
4. "Shine On" – 3:29
5. "White Sugar" – 4:43 *
6. "Jumpin' Jack Flash" (Mick Jagger, Keith Richards) – 7:40
7. "Day's Dawning/Closing" – 3:34 *

(* Available only on the 25th Anniversary Deluxe Edition)

=== 35th anniversary deluxe edition ===
Same track listing as the 25th anniversary edition plus an extra track "Do You Feel Like We Do" featuring Warren Haynes.

== Personnel ==
- Peter Frampton – lead vocals, lead guitar, talk box on "Do You Feel Like We Do" and "Show Me The Way"
- Bob Mayo – rhythm guitar, piano, Fender Rhodes electric piano, Hammond organ, vocals
- Stanley Sheldon – bass, vocals
- John Siomos – drums, percussion

=== Production ===
- Audio engineer: Chris Kimsey Engineer Live Recording and Original Mixer 1976
- Audio engineer: Ray Thompson
- Photography: Mike Zagaris
- Mastering: Mike Reese at The Mastering Lab
- Remastering: Doug Sax at The Mastering Lab, Los Angeles
- Remastering: Roger Wake at Bourbery-Wake
- Remastering (25th Anniversary Edition): Bob Ludwig at Gateway Mastering Studios, Portland, ME, October 2000
- Remix (25th Anniversary Edition): Chuck Ainlay at Backstage Studios Nashville, TN, August/September 2000

== Chart positions ==
=== Weekly charts ===
Weekly chart performance for Frampton Comes Alive!
| Chart (1976–1979) | Peak position |
|---|---|
| Australian Albums (Billboard) | 1 |
| Australian Albums (Kent Music Report) | 8 |
| Belgian Albums (Billboard) | 6 |
| Canadian Albums (RPM) | 1 |
| Dutch Albums (Album Top 100) | 2 |
| French Albums (IFOP) | 7 |
| German Albums (Offizielle Top 100) | 4 |
| Greek Albums (Billboard) | 5 |
| Japanese Albums (Oricon) | 67 |
| New Zealand Albums (RMNZ) | 3 |
| Portuguese Albums (Billboard) | 1 |
| Spanish Albums (Billboard) | 2 |
| Swiss Albums (Billboard) | 10 |
| US Billboard 200 | 1 |
| US Rock LP Best Sellers (Billboard) | 1 |
| US Top 100 Albums (Cashbox) | 1 |

=== Year-end charts ===
1976 year-end chart performance for Frampton Comes Alive!
| Chart (1976) | Position |
|---|---|
| Australian Albums (Kent Music Report) | 25 |
| Canadian Albums (RPM) | 1 |
| New Zealand Albums (RMNZ) | 11 |
| UK Albums (OCC) | 16 |
| US Billboard 200 | 1 |
| US Top 100 Albums (Cashbox) | 1 |

1977 year-end chart performance for Frampton Comes Alive!
| Chart (1977) | Position |
|---|---|
| Australian Albums (Kent Music Report) | 13 |
| Canadian Albums (RPM) | 9 |
| German Albums (Offizielle Top 100) | 23 |
| New Zealand Albums (RMNZ) | 9 |
| US Billboard 200 | 14 |

== Certifications and sales ==
Certifications and sales for Frampton Comes Alive!
| Region | Certification | Certified units/sales |
|---|---|---|
| Australia (ARIA) | 3× Platinum | 150,000^{^} |
| Canada (Music Canada) | Gold | 50,000^{^} |
| Japan | — | 15,000 |
| United Kingdom (BPI) | Gold | 100,000^{^} |
| United States (RIAA) | 8× Platinum | 8,000,000^{^} |
^{^} Shipments figures based on certification alone.
