= Reality Bites (soundtrack) =

1994 film soundtrack albums

Reality Bites (Original Motion Picture Soundtrack)

Soundtrack album by various artists
- Released: February 8, 1994
- Genres: Pop rock; indie rock; alternative rock; folk rock; classical rock; soft rock; reggae
- Length: 58:03 (standard); 80:22 (deluxe)
- Label: RCA
- Producer: Ron Fair

Singles from Reality Bites (Original Motion Picture Soundtrack)
- 1. "Stay (I Missed You)" Released: 1994

Reality Bites (Original Motion Picture Soundtrack) is the soundtrack album to the 1994 film Reality Bites directed by Ben Stiller, who also starred in the film alongside Ethan Hawke and Winona Ryder in the lead roles. The soundtrack was released through RCA Records on February 8, 1994, featuring 14 tracks, and also included a hit single "Stay (I Missed You)" which became a chart-topping success and a breakthrough for its singer-songwriter Lisa Loeb. The album, too achieved significant commercial success for its variety of music appealing to the younger demographic and was certified double platinum by the Recording Industry Association of America (RIAA) for selling 2 million units. A 10th anniversary edition soundtrack featuring six additional songs were released in February 2004.

== Background ==
RCA Records met with the film's music supervisor Karyn Rachtman and Ben Stiller three weeks into filming, to discuss the soundtrack album. They finalized a deal and the label opened its roster to the director, who picked only one band: Me Phi Me. Lisa Loeb, a mutual friend of Ethan Hawke, had performed one song "Stay (I Missed You)" with her band Nine Stories, which marked the start of her career. Loeb initially recorded the song in the early 1990s to sell it to Daryl Hall for a project he was seeking music for. However, she decided to use the song herself. Eventually, she gave the tape to Hawke, who in turn gave it to Stiller and had agreed to use the song. Though the song was initially titled "Stay", it later included the title "I Miss You" in the soundtrack to avoid confusion with other rock songs under the same title.

The film's soundtrack includes songs by World Party, Squeeze, the Knack (a remixed version of "My Sharona" featured prominently in one scene from the film), Juliana Hatfield, Social Distortion, Big Mountain ("Baby, I Love Your Way") and two contributions from Crowded House ("Locked Out" and "Something So Strong"). It also includes "Conjunction Junction" from Schoolhouse Rock!, another song brought into the foreground of a film full of pop culture references. Besides acting, Ethan Hawke also performed two songs in the film.

== Marketing and release ==
Reality Bites soundtrack was released on February 8, 1994, featuring 15 tracks. RCA Records aggressively marketed the album and had five tracks on rotation on radio and MTV. The video for Crowded House's "Locked Out" was updated to include footage from the film. In addition, the video for "Spin the Bottle" by the Juliana Hatfield Three was directed by Stiller and featured clips from the film as well. Ethan Hawke directed the music video for "Stay" in a rare one-take video on film, a continuous Steadicam shot operated by Robin Buerki. As a part of the film's 10th anniversary, RCA released another soundtrack featuring six additional tracks that were not included in the original release.

== Commercial performance ==
The soundtrack sold 1.2 million units upon initial release and reached #13 on the Billboard 200. The album also earned a Billboard Hot 100 No. 1 single with Lisa Loeb's "Stay (I Missed You)"; Loeb thereby became the first artist to top the Billboard Hot 100 charts even before she was signed by major record labels. The soundtrack peaked at number 2 in Australia and was certified platinum.

== Reception ==
Reality Bites has been ranked at number 80 on one of the greatest soundtracks of all time by Rolling Stone. It has been regarded as one of the best soundtracks that came during the 1990s. Stephen Thomas Erlewine said that "the soundtrack to Reality Bites presents the finest of the decade's mainstream alternative pop artists".

== Track listing ==
Reality Bites — standard edition
No.	Title	Artist(s)	Length
1.	"My Sharona"	The Knack	4:57
2.	"Spin the Bottle"	Juliana Hatfield Three	2:23
3.	"Bed of Roses"	The Indians	3:51
4.	"When You Come Back to Me"	World Party	3:09
5.	"Going, Going, Gone"	The Posies	3:34
6.	"Stay (I Missed You)"	Lisa Loeb & Nine Stories	3:03
7.	"All I Want Is You"	U2	6:32
8.	"Locked Out"	Crowded House	3:18
9.	"Spinning Around Over You"	Lenny Kravitz	3:36
10.	"I'm Nuthin'"	Ethan Hawke	3:37
11.	"Turnip Farm"	Dinosaur Jr.	5:48
12.	"Revival!"	Me Phi Me	5:44
13.	"Tempted"	Squeeze	4:07
14.	"Baby, I Love Your Way"	Big Mountain	4:24
Total length:			58:03

Reality Bites — 10th anniversary deluxe edition
No.	Title	Artist(s)	Length
15.	"Stay (I Missed You) (Living Room mix)"	Lisa Loeb	2:55
16.	"Add It Up"	Ethan Hawke	3:08
17.	"Confusion"	New Order	4:42
18.	"Disco Inferno"	The Trammps	3:35
19.	"Give a Man a Fish"	Arrested Development	4:24
20.	"Fools Like Me"	Lisa Loeb	3:35
Total length:			80:22

== Charts ==
=== Weekly charts ===
Weekly chart performance for Reality Bites
Chart (1994)	Peak position
Australian Albums (ARIA)	2
Canada Top Albums/CDs (RPM)	12
German Albums (Offizielle Top 100)	83
New Zealand Albums (RMNZ)	17
Swedish Albums (Sverigetopplistan)	35
UK Compilation Albums (Official Charts)	24
US Billboard 200	13

Chart (2026)	Peak position
Greek Albums (IFPI)	52

=== Year-end charts ===
Year-end chart performance for Reality Bites
Chart (1994)	Position
Australian Albums (ARIA)	31
Canada Top Albums/CDs (RPM)	52
US Billboard 200	40
US Soundtrack Albums (Billboard)	5

== Certifications ==
Certifications for Reality Bites
Region	Certification	Certified units/sales
Australia (ARIA)	Platinum	70,000^{^}
Canada (Music Canada)	Platinum	100,000^{^}
United States (RIAA)	2× Platinum	2,000,000^{^}
^{^} Shipments figures based on certification alone.
