= Dean Markley USA =

Musical instrument manufacturer

Dean Markley USA, Inc.
- Company type: Private
- Industry: Musical instruments
- Founded: 1972
- Founder: Dean Markley
- Headquarters: 17505 N. 79th Ave, Glendale, Arizona
- Products: Instrument strings; Acoustic guitar pickups; Musical instrument accessories
- Number of employees: 100 (est)
- Website: deanmarkley.com

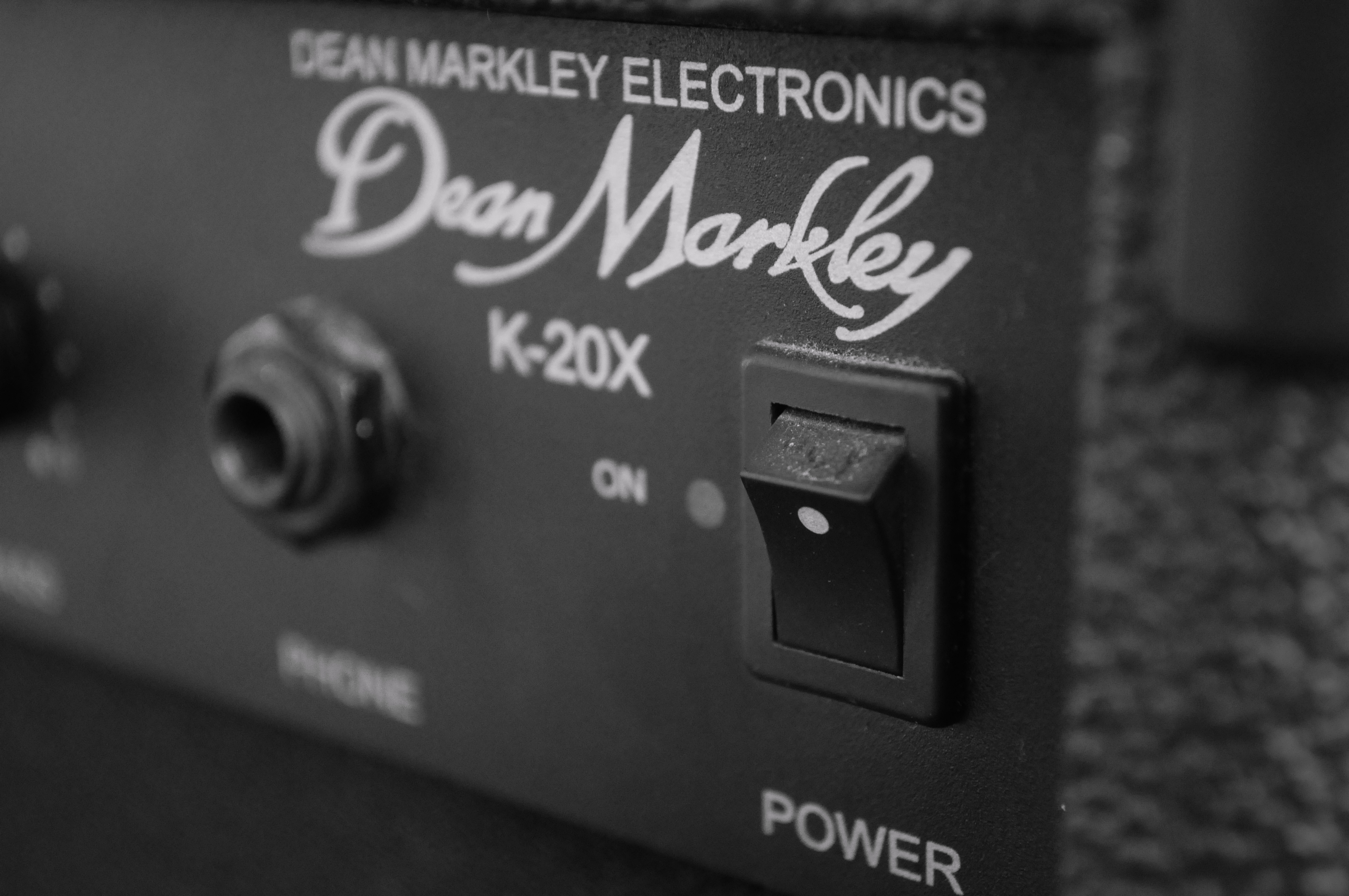
Dean Markley Electronics K-20X Guitar Amplifier (c.1997)

Dean Markley Strings is an American company that manufactures musical instrument-related products, primarily strings for acoustic and electric guitars, classical guitars, and bass guitars. The company also produces pick ups, amplifiers, and tuners, with instrument strings being their feature product.

== History ==
Before starting the company, Dean Markley was a music store owner in Santa Clara, California. In 1972 he began selling string designs he came up with himself through experimentation. His first breakthrough into success was when he created the Voice Box effects pedal used by Peter Frampton in his smash hit "Show Me the Way".

== Blue Steel guitar strings ==
One of Dean Markley's recent notable innovations are "Blue Steel" guitar and bass strings, which are cryogenically frozen with liquid nitrogen to make them last longer.
