= Unity (Big Mountain album) =

Studio album by Big Mountain
- Released: 1994
- Genre: Reggae; pop
- Length: 47:06
- Label: Giant

Big Mountain chronology
Wake Up (1992)	Unity (1994)	Resistance (1996)

Unity is an album by the American band Big Mountain, released in 1994.

The album peaked at No. 174 on the Billboard 200. "Sweet Sensual Love" was released as a single, peaking at No. 51 on the UK Singles Chart. Unity sold more than a million copies. The band supported the album by headlining Reggae Sunsplash in 1994 and 1995.

== Production ==
The songs were written by frontman Quino; many of the lyrics contain political themes and criticisms of U.S. governmental policy. Quino sang in Spanish on some songs. "Border Town" is about undocumented workers. The cover of "Baby, I Love Your Way" first appeared on the soundtrack to Reality Bites.

== Critical reception ==
Professional ratings
Review scores
Source	Rating
The Atlanta Journal-Constitution	1.5/4 stars
The Buffalo News	2/5 stars
Calgary Herald	B
The Encyclopedia of Popular Music	4/5 stars
Los Angeles Daily News	1.5/4 stars

The Calgary Herald wrote that the band "is never less than soothing, often inspiring, and its lyrics of love (personal, spiritual, political) is a welcome respite from the below-the-belt toastin' so common today." The Baltimore Sun praised the cover of "Baby, I Love Your Way" but determined that, "unfortunately, that sort of trick works only once an album, and anyone expecting more of the same from Unity will be sorely disappointed." The Atlanta Journal-Constitution stated that Unity "offers Rastafarian vibes for summer beer decks everywhere."

The Los Angeles Times noted that "the seed planted by Jamaican music and reggae culture is filtered through an American perspective." The Los Angeles Daily News called the album "too pop oriented, too lightweight", writing that "it lacks the pathos that made Marley, at even his most chirpy, believable." The Orange County Register concluded that "this group is extremely commercial; at its most hard-hitting, Big Mountain sounds like a more accessible Steel Pulse."

== Track listing ==
No.	Title	Writer(s)	Producer(s)	Length
1.	"Fruitful Days"	Quino; James McWhinney; Brett Fovargue	Bruce Caplin; Quino	3:56
2.	"Border Town"	Quino; Lance Rhodes	Quino	4:03
3.	"Upful & Right"	Quino; J. McWhinney	Quino; Caplin	3:28
4.	"Sweet Sensual Love"	Quino	Kevin Flournoy	3:46
5.	"I Would Find a Way"	Diane Warren	Steve Lindsey; Jeff Aldrich (ex.)	5:05
6.	"Tengo Ganas"	Quino; Rhodes	Flournoy	4:24
7.	"Baby, I Love Your Way"	Peter Frampton	Ron Fair; Aldrich (ex.)	4:09
8.	"Young Revolutionaries"	Quino	Caplin; Quino	3:50
9.	"Revolution"	Quino	Caplin; Quino	3:39
10.	"Time Has Come"	Lynn Copeland; Quino	Lynn Copeland; Quino	3:41
11.	"Big Mountain"	Quino; Jerome Cruz	Quino; Caplin	7:05
Total length:				47:06

== Charts ==
Chart performance for Unity
Chart (1994)	Peak position
Australian Albums (ARIA)	97
Austrian Albums (Ö3 Austria)	15
Dutch Albums (Album Top 100)	52
German Albums (Offizielle Top 100)	52
New Zealand Albums (RMNZ)	29
Swedish Albums (Sverigetopplistan)	37
Swiss Albums (Schweizer Hitparade)	10
US Billboard 200	174
