= Stay (I Missed You) =

1994 single by Lisa Loeb

Single by Lisa Loeb and Nine Stories

from the album Reality Bites (Original Motion Picture Soundtrack)
- Released: 1994
- Genre: Pop rock; folk rock; folk-pop; alternative rock; alternative pop
- Length: 3:04
- Label: RCA
- Songwriter: Lisa Loeb
- Producer: Juan Patiño

Lisa Loeb and Nine Stories singles chronology
"Stay (I Missed You)" (1994)	"Taffy" (1995)

Music video
- "Stay (I Missed You)" on YouTube

"Stay (I Missed You)" is a song by American singer-songwriter Lisa Loeb. It was released in 1994 through RCA Records as the lead single from the original movie soundtrack to Reality Bites (1994). The song was written by Loeb and produced by Juan Patiño. "Stay" was originally conceived in 1990, at one point with the intent of selling it to Daryl Hall for a project he was seeking music for. Upon deciding to use the song herself, Loeb's neighbor and friend, actor Ethan Hawke, heard the song and submitted it to Ben Stiller for use in the film he was directing, Reality Bites. The song plays over the film's closing credits. Musically, "Stay" is a pop rock song influenced by folk rock music. Lyrically, the song deals with a relationship that has recently ended, but the narrator is now regretful.

"Stay" received positive reviews from most music critics, who praised the lyrical and production side and the song's commercial potential. Several critics had listed the song in some of the best song lists. "Stay" ultimately went on to become a number-one hit on both the US Billboard Hot 100 and Cash Box Top 100 charts, earning her the distinction of being the first artist to top the US chart before being signed to any record label. The song was commercially successful in several other countries, including Canada, where it also reached number one, and in Australia, Iceland, New Zealand, and the United Kingdom. The song's music video was conceived, produced and directed by Hawke. For their performance of the song, Lisa Loeb and Nine Stories were nominated for a Grammy for Best Pop Performance by a Duo or Group with Vocals, losing to All-4-One's "I Swear".

== Background ==
Before "Stay (I Missed You)" was commercially released, Loeb had previous musical ventures. After graduating from high school in 1986, she went to Brown University, where she graduated in 1990 with a degree in comparative literature. At Brown, she and Elizabeth Mitchell formed a band named Liz and Lisa, with future singer/songwriter and classmate Duncan Sheik as a guitarist. The duo released the albums Liz and Lisa (1989) and Liz and Lisa - Days Were Different (1990) independently. After college, bassist Rick Lassiter and TV and drummer Chad Fisher joined the band. After developing a following together, Loeb and Mitchell parted ways a few years after college. While talking about her past musical ventures, Loeb said: "When the song came out, though, I had been playing music since I was a little kid and I'd had gigs since high school, and I'd been making recordings for almost 10 years at that point. I didn't realize what an impact having a No. 1 single would have. It connects me with people of different ages, and I get to travel all over the world."

She attended Berklee School of Music in Boston for a session of summer school, and in 1990 formed a full band called Nine Stories. The band, which was named after the book by J. D. Salinger, included Tim Bright on guitar, Jonathan Feinberg on drums, and Joe Quigley on bass. Loeb began working with producer Juan Patiño to make the cassette Purple Tape in 1992. It included the earliest recordings of later popular tracks such as "Do You Sleep?", "Snow Day", "Train Songs", and "It's Over". Loeb sold the violet-colored cassette to fans at gigs and sent it to music industry promoters. Loeb and her band also made a recording of "Stay" during the same time. Loeb originally intended for the song to be used by Daryl Hall, whom she had heard was looking for songs for a solo project; before the song was finished, however, she had been told Hall no longer needed additional music.

Loeb was discovered by actor and friend Ethan Hawke, who lived in an apartment across the street from her in New York City. She met Hawke through mutual friends in the NYC theatre community. Loeb had been performing "Stay" to positive response at her shows, and Hawke gave a tape of Loeb's song to director Ben Stiller during the making of the film Reality Bites. Stiller subsequently agreed to use the song in the film and on the film's soundtrack. The song was titled simply "Stay" on the Reality Bites soundtrack. As the single moved up the airplay charts, the title was changed to "Stay (I Missed You)" to avoid confusion with previous rock hits that had the same one-word name.

In 2023, Loeb performed a send-up of the song for a video promoting the return of Old Bay-flavored Goldfish. She said that while the original song is precious to her, she was not above using it for lighthearted humor.

== Composition and writing ==
"At the time I was having arguments with my boyfriend, who was actually my co-producer as well – we made records together. And then I go off into some other areas: I remember somebody close to me was going through severe, severe depression. A lot of times in my songs, I get into some phase where I describe some other situation, and there's a whole verse in there about somebody who is very, very depressed. But yeah, it was a story about a breakup I was going through, and that situation where it's gotten into your head too much..."

—Lisa Loeb talking about the inspiration of "Stay (I Missed You)"

Musically, "Stay" is a pop rock song with folk rock influence. Vocally, according to a publication, "The tonal shifts in the vocals also are quite affecting. Loeb rants and rails through much of the song with barely contained emotion only to pull back for some tenderness in the refrain. It's an outstanding performance of an enduring song." The song is structured around a central passage of sonic catharsis. After the tentative opening, the pace and density of Loeb's roiling litany of self-recrimination increases; the personal pronouns pile up; the accents of the bass and backing voices grow unruly and insistent, like nagging, negative thoughts heaping on one another.

According to Rhik Samadder, Loeb's guitar picks out a simple arpeggio as she admonishes: "You say I only hear what I want to," warning us that this may be the most self-involved song ever written. Almost every line contains a clutch of first person singulars: "I turn the radio on, I turn the radio up, and this woman was singing my song." Based on the song's theme, the break-up song is not about a relationship with a departed lover, but the relationship with ourselves [...] About accepting that our basic loneliness is unsophisticated and shared, and that we have to abandon the selfish dramas of our malaise to properly love. It's a point of emotional development [...]" Regarding the lyrical content, Loeb's explained; "I turn the radio on, I turn the radio up, and this woman was singing my song," Lisa explained: "That was when you hear somebody telling your exact story. It's funny, because it wasn't until later, after a couple of major breakups, that I realized when you're depressed and you're going through these breakups, the breakup was supposed to happen. If you're going through difficult times, it's hilarious how you turn on the radio and even the most cliché things perfectly capture how you're feeling. And then you realize why people wrote those songs."

According to Jim Beviglia of American Songwriter, "Loeb's lyrics definitely capture the breathless way of expressing oneself that was common at the time. Considering all of the lines that start with 'And,' the song can seem like one big run-on sentence. Yet in the midst of all of the breathlessness, she focuses enough to spin out several couplets that really nail the topsy-turvy feeling that romantic mind games can play on you."

== Critical reception ==
"Stay (I Missed You)" was well received by music critics. Larry Flick of Billboard magazine wrote: "Harmonic rock ballad from New York-based upstarts perfectly balances on the fine line between modern rock, AC, and top 40 pop sensibilities. With a vulnerable, determined delivery, Loeb's vocals recall the sweetness of the Sundays' Harriet Wheeler and the brashness of Edie Brickell." In the UK, Alan Jones from Music Week stated that "its pleasing amalgam of semi-acoustic stumming and sublime vocals is attractive enough to do rather well." Mark Surtherland in Smash Hits predicted UK chart success akin to that on the US charts, calling it "a rather touching acoustic ballad thingy in its own right. Just right for when you're feeling a bit angstful, and could be just as big here. In his retrospective review of the album Tails, Stephen Thomas Erlewine from AllMusic said: "Tails delivers on the promise of 'Stay'. While the basic folk-rock elements of the song are present, much of the material on the record doesn't sound like her breakthrough hit; there are some distorted guitars here and there, and she even rocks out a little bit. Nothing on Tails is as good as 'Stay'." In 2005, Erlewine wrote of the song in a review of The Very Best of Lisa Loeb. He said "'Stay (I Missed You)' took her from obscurity to minor celebrity when it was included on the soundtrack of Reality Bites [...] While Loeb never strayed very far from the sweet, gentle template she laid down with 'Stay (I Missed You),' she always was friendly, melodic, and rather ingratiating."

Almost 20 years after the release of Reality Bites, Jim Beviglia from American Songwriter wrote: "What [Reality Bites] did yield was a song that not only succinctly summed up that era but also managed to transcend it [...] Lisa Loeb's 'Stay (I Missed You)' is not just the relic of a specific era. It still resonates with anyone who ever loved someone not mature enough to properly reciprocate." Rhik Samadder from The Guardian centered the song in an "Old Music" article, praising the song saying: "Listening to the song now is like looking into a crystal ball backwards, seeing myself looking into it forwards. For that convoluted and dubious reason, whenever I hear Stay, I always turn the radio up."

=== Recognition ===
Charles Aaron from Spin ranked "Stay" number 20 on his list of the "Top 20 Singles of the Year" in December 1994. It later placed 93rd on VH1's "100 Greatest Songs of the 90's". The song was placed at number 100 on Entertainment Weekly's "The 100 Greatest Summer Songs", saying, "Every summer needs its lovelorn ballad along with its roof raisers, and Loeb's winsome plea fit the bill." Loeb and Nine Stories received a Grammy nomination for Best Pop Performance by a Group but lost to All-4-One's "I Swear". The group won a Brit Award for Best International Newcomer for the single in 1995.

== Chart performance ==
After being featured in the film Reality Bites, "Stay (I Missed You)" entered the US Billboard Hot 100 in early April 1994. The song climbed the chart and eventually ascended to number one that August. Because of this, Loeb earned the distinction of being the first artist to top the US charts before being signed to any record label. For over 19 years, Loeb was the only artist to have this distinction, until the achievement was matched in 2013 by American duo Macklemore & Ryan Lewis with their single "Thrift Shop". "Stay" held the number-one position for three weeks and stayed in the Hot 100 for 30 weeks. It also reached one on the US Cash Box Top 100, number five on the Billboard Adult Contemporary chart, number seven on the Billboard Modern Rock Tracks chart, and number one on the Billboard Top 40/Mainstream chart. The song was certified gold by the Recording Industry Association of America (RIAA) in July 1994 for the shipment of 500,000 copies. "Stay" ultimately sold 900,000 copies domestically.

The song debuted at number 23 on the New Zealand Singles Chart on August 14, 1994, and was the second-highest debuting single that week. It peaked at number 14 during its third week and remained in the top 50 for a total of 13 weeks. "Stay" debuted at number 39 on the Australian Singles Chart on August 7, 1994, and entered the top 10 during its fourth week, eventually peaking at number six for three consecutive weeks. The song stayed in the chart for a total of 17 weeks. In the United Kingdom, the single debuted at 27 on the UK Singles Chart, spending 15 weeks within the top 100 and climbing to a peak of number six. In July 2024, the British Phonographic Industry (BPI) awarded the song a gold certification for shipments exceeding 400,000 copies. Elsewhere in Europe, "Stay" reached number nine in Iceland and became a top-40 hit in Ireland, the Netherlands, and Sweden.

== Music video ==
The music video for "Stay (I Missed You)", directed by Ethan Hawke and released in 1994, begins with a cat on a chair, then zooms out to Loeb (wearing a forest green dress and tortoiseshell glasses) singing the lyrics while walking around in the empty New York City apartment. No audio, visual or green screen effects were used through the very basic and simple video. It has two continuous camera shots of Loeb in an apartment. Very near the end of the music video, the cat (which belonged to Hawke) reappears, this time sitting on a windowsill. According to the VH1 show Pop-Up Video, the video was filmed in just two separate takes. It was selected as the 1994 video of the year by Spin magazine.

== Track listings ==
- US CD and cassette single
- UK 7-inch and cassette single
1. "Stay (I Missed You)" (album version) – 3:04
2. "Stay (I Missed You)" (Living Room mix) – 2:54
- UK, European, and Australian CD single
- Australian cassette single
1. "Stay (I Missed You)" (album version) – 3:04
2. "Stay (I Missed You)" (Living Room mix) – 2:54
3. "Stay (I Missed You)" (instrumental) – 3:00
- 2019 Record Store Day 12-inch single
1. "Stay (I Missed You)" (album version) – 2:58
2. "Stay (I Missed You)" (live) – 2:47
3. "Waiting for Wednesday" (live) – 2:52
4. "Truthfully" (live) – 2:54
5. "I Do" (live) – 3:31

== Credits and personnel ==
Credits are taken from the US and UK CD single liner notes.

Studios

- Mastered at Sterling Sound Studios (New York City)

Musicians

- Lisa Loeb – writing, lead vocals, harmony vocals, acoustic guitars
- Elizabeth Mitchell – harmony vocals
- Juan Patiño – harmony vocals, production, engineering
- Tim Bright – electric guitar
- Daniel Littleton – electric guitar
- Joe Quigley – bass guitar
- Jonathan Feinberg – drums
- Steve Forman – percussion

Other personnel

- Brian Malouf – mixing
- Steve Holroyd – additional engineering
- Ted Jensen – mastering
- Jacqueline Murphy – art direction
- Sean Smith – design
- Eduardo Patiño – photography
- Pamela Taylor – hair and make-up
- Tom Richmond – cat photo

== Charts ==
=== Weekly charts ===
Chart (1994–1995)	Peak position
Australia (ARIA)	6
Belgium (Ultratop 50 Flanders)	50
Canada Top Singles (RPM)	1
Canada Adult Contemporary (RPM)	3
Europe (Eurochart Hot 100)	17
Europe (European AC Radio)	13
Europe (European Hit Radio)	9
Germany (GfK)	59
Iceland (Íslenski Listinn Topp 40)	9
Ireland (IRMA)	12
Israel (Israeli Singles Chart)	21
Mexico (Notitas Musicales Hit Parade)	1
Netherlands (Single Top 100)	32
New Zealand (Recorded Music NZ)	14
Quebec (ADISQ)	28
Scottish Singles Sales (Official Charts)	7
Sweden (Sverigetopplistan)	38
UK Singles (Official Charts)	6
UK Airplay (Music Week)	1
US Billboard Hot 100	1
US Adult Contemporary (Billboard)	5
US Modern Rock Tracks (Billboard)	7
US Top 40/Mainstream (Billboard)	1
US Top 40/Rhythm-Crossover (Billboard)	11
US Cash Box Top 100	1

=== Year-end charts ===
Chart (1994)	Position
Australia (ARIA)	35
Brazil (Mais Tocadas)	33
Canada Top Singles (RPM)	13
Canada Adult Contemporary (RPM)	41
Europe (European Hit Radio)	19
Iceland (Íslenski Listinn Topp 40)	33
UK Singles (OCC)	40
UK Airplay (Music Week)	21
US Billboard Hot 100	6
US Adult Contemporary (Billboard)	33
US Modern Rock Tracks (Billboard)	33
US Cash Box Top 100	2

=== Decade-end charts ===
Chart (1990–1999)	Position
US Billboard Hot 100	42

== Certifications ==
Region	Certification	Certified units/sales
United Kingdom (BPI)	Gold	400,000^{‡}
United States (RIAA)	Gold	500,000^{^}
^{^} Shipments figures based on certification alone.^{‡} Sales+streaming figures based on certification alone.

== Cover versions ==
"Stay" was covered in 2006 by Filipino singer Chris Cayzer for his self-titled debut album. In 2007, it was covered by pop-punk band New Found Glory for From the Screen to Your Stereo Part II and featured Loeb on supporting vocals. Sarah Silverman performed a cover version of the song in the episode "I Thought My Dad Was Dead, But It Turns Out He's Not" from the second season of The Sarah Silverman Program. Two lines from the song ("You say I only hear what I want to/You say I talk so all the time") can be heard from "Much has Been Said", a song by the Filipino rock band Bamboo from their album Light Peace Love.

The song was used in the movie, Hot Tub Time Machine 2, in 2015. Craig Robinson's character, Nick Webber, is revealed to have made his money by writing some of the best pop songs of the '90s (plagiarizing them using time travel) - this includes a poorly written version of "Stay (I Missed You)" complete with Webber recreating the video in place of Loeb. Loeb plays herself in the movie as a cat wrangler helping out on the set of the music video. In 2019, Loeb remade the song in collaboration with Canadian indie band Walk Off the Earth.
