= Purple Tape =

Demo album by Lisa Loeb
- Released: 1992
- Recorded: 1991–1992
- Studio: United Stations Radio Networks, New York City
- Genre: Alternative rock
- Length: 32:43
- Label: Self-released
- Producer: Juan Patiño

Lisa Loeb chronology
Purple Tape (1992)	Tails (1995)

Professional ratings
Review scores
Source	Rating
AllMusic	4/5 stars

Purple Tape is the debut album by Lisa Loeb.

== Overview ==
The album was self-released in 1992 on audio cassette only, used to showcase her talents to record companies. The record features mostly Loeb's voice accompanied by a guitar.

Loeb would later include and re-record the majority of these songs on her later albums Tails ("It's Over", "Snow Day", "Do You Sleep?" and "Hurricane") and Firecracker ("This" and "Guessing Game").

While Purple Tape was a cassette only release some of the songs were released as b-sides on singles from Tails.

The album itself did not see its CD release until January 22, 2008, when it was released as a two-CD including an extensive interview with Loeb about the album.

== Track listing ==
All tracks are written by Lisa Loeb.

Side A
No.	Title	Length
1.	"Snow Day"	3:33
2.	"Train Songs"	3:19
3.	"Hurricane"	3:50
4.	"Come Back Home"	3:39
5.	"It's Over"	3:37

Side B
No.	Title	Length
1.	"This"	3:02
2.	"Days Were Different"	3:28
3.	"Guessing Game"	2:21
4.	"Do You Sleep?"	3:41
5.	"Airplanes"	2:16

2008 Bonus Interview CD with Lisa Loeb and Andy Denemark
No.	Title	Length
1.	"The Purple Tape: Introduction and History"	2:34
2.	"Early Days in NYC"	1:04
3.	"Liz and Lisa"	1:18
4.	"Why the Purple Tape?"	0:57
5.	"Gigging in NYC"	1:54
6.	"Nine Stories"	0:37
7.	"Marketing and the Music Business"	3:09
8.	"Recording the Purple Tape"	3:27
9.	"The Purple Tape Artwork"	1:53
10.	"Song Writing"	1:52
11.	"Snow Day" (Interview)	4:49
12.	"Train Songs" (Interview)	3:50
13.	"Hurricane" (Interview)	3:20
14.	"Come Back Home" (Interview)	3:11
15.	"It's Over" (Interview)	3:59
16.	"This" (Interview)	4:02
17.	"Days Were Different" (Interview)	1:20
18.	"Guessing Game" (Interview)	2:44
19.	"Do You Sleep?" (Interview)	4:06
20.	"Airplanes" (Interview)	2:38
21.	"Bringing the Past to the Present"	1:41
22.	"Snow Day" (Live In-Studio)	4:05
23.	"Stay (I Missed You)" (Acoustic)	2:58
