= Frampton (album) =

Studio album by Peter Frampton
- Released: March 1975
- Recorded: October 1974 – February 1975
- Studios: Ronnie Lane's Mobile Studio, Clearwell Castle, Gloucestershire Overdubs at Olympic Studios, London
- Genre: Rock
- Length: 37:16
- Label: A&M
- Producer: Peter Frampton

Peter Frampton chronology
Somethin's Happening (1974)	Frampton (1975)	Frampton Comes Alive! (1976)

Professional ratings
Review scores
Source	Rating
Allmusic	4/5 stars
The Encyclopedia of Popular Music	2/5 stars
Rolling Stone	(not rated)

Frampton is the fourth studio album by English rock musician Peter Frampton, released in 1975. It was his last studio release before he went on tour and recorded his live album Frampton Comes Alive!. The most popular songs from the album are "Show Me the Way" and "Baby, I Love Your Way", which became big hits when released as singles from Frampton Comes Alive! The album peaked No. 32 on the US Billboard Top LPs & Tape chart.

== Background ==
Peter Frampton left Humble Pie in 1971 because that group fell into a loud, hard rock groove that overwhelmed the technical skills he had spent years working on as a guitarist; he poured a lot of that into Frampton, a highly melodic mid-tempo rock album.

Frampton's band experienced changes when keyboardist and rhythm guitar player Andy Bown decided to leave the group after a year, and once again focus on his solo career, and bassist Rick Wills decided to leave the group while touring to spend more time with his family and his baby. For this album Bown played bass, with all keyboards and guitars played by Frampton. Subsequently Frampton recruited Americans Bob Mayo (keyboards, guitars, vocals) and Stanley Sheldon (bass, vocals) for his touring band, and this group recorded the hugely successful Frampton Comes Alive! live album during 1975.

The album took three weeks to write. In October 1974, Frampton recorded at Clearwell Castle in Gloucestershire, with Ronnie Lane's Mobile Studio parked outside. Additional overdubs were undertaken subsequently at Olympic Studios in London.

== Album information ==
On the album, Frampton composes in a wide range of styles, both instrumentally and vocally. The compositions feature acoustic and electric guitar textures, as apparent on "The Crying Clown", and the acoustic instrumental "Penny For Your Thoughts." Also, "Nowhere's Too Far (For My Baby)" and "Day's Dawning" are examples of melodic arena rock on the album.

Frampton's work on the album did much to enhance his reputation as a solo artist. The album went to No. 32 on the Billboard Top LPs & Tape album chart, setting the stage for his 1975 tour which would produce the blockbuster success of his double live LP Frampton Comes Alive!.

Record World called the single "(I'll Give You) Money" a "perfect synthesis of hard rock chording and bittersweet vocals with Peter's innate sense of harmony and timing leaving a warm afterglow."

== Track listing ==
All songs written by Peter Frampton.

Side one

1. "Day's Dawning" – 3:55
2. "Show Me the Way" – 4:02
3. "One More Time" – 3:19
4. "The Crying Clown" – 4:03
5. "Fanfare" – 3:28

Side two

1. "Nowhere's Too Far (for My Baby)" – 4:18
2. "Nassau" – 1:07 / "Baby, I Love Your Way" – 4:42
3. "Apple of Your Eye" – 3:41
4. "Penny for Your Thoughts" – 1:27
5. "(I'll Give You) Money" – 4:34

== Personnel ==
- Peter Frampton – lead vocals, guitar, acoustic guitar, piano, organ, talkbox, bass on "Baby, I Love Your Way"
- Andy Bown – bass
- John Siomos – drums, percussion

=== Additional personnel ===
- Poli Palmer – vibraphone on "The Crying Clown"

=== Production ===
- Producer: Peter Frampton, Chris Kimsey
- Engineer: Chris Kimsey, Andy Knight
- Mixing: George Marino
- Mastering: George Marino, Doug Sax, Arnie Acosta
- Art Direction: Vartan, Roland Young, Junie Osaki
- Photography: Mike Zagaris
- Supervisor: Beth Stempel, Bill Levenson
- Coordination: Beth Stempel, Bill Levenson
- Management: Dee Anthony

== Charts ==
Chart (1975)	Peak position
Canada Top Albums/CDs (RPM)	37
US Billboard 200	32

== Certifications ==
Region	Certification	Certified units/sales
United States (RIAA)	Gold	500,000^{^}
^{^} Shipments figures based on certification alone.
