= John Siomos =

American drummer

- Left to right: Bob Mayo, Peter Frampton, John Siomos, Stanley Sheldon, 1975

Background information
- Also known as: John Headley-Down
- Born: John T. Siomos; July 30, 1947; Chicago, Illinois, US
- Died: January 16, 2004 (age 56) Brooklyn, New York, US
- Genres: Hard rock, blues rock, folk rock
- Occupations: Musician, songwriter, emergency medical technician
- Instruments: Drums, percussion
- Formerly of: Chicago Loop

John T. Siomos (July 30, 1947 – January 16, 2004) was an American drummer who performed with Todd Rundgren, Mitch Ryder and the Detroit Wheels, Rick Derringer, Carly Simon, Mark "Moogy" Klingman, Buzzy Linhart and Peter Frampton.

Born in Chicago, Illinois, he died in Brooklyn, New York.

== Early life ==
Siomos was born in Chicago, son of Nick and Susie (née Kollias). He had a twin brother Steve. They were fraternal twins.

== Career ==
In 1969, Siomos played drums in the Buzzy Linhart Quartet with Buzzy Linhart, guitarist Doug Rodrigues and bassist Doug Rauch. They then called their group Music and recorded the self-titled album Music, produced by Music and Eddie Kramer and released by Eleuthera Records in 1971.

Siomos played on Peter Frampton's Frampton Comes Alive. Siomos, also known as John Headley-Down, co-wrote and performed on the songs "Doobie Wah", and the hit single "Do You Feel Like We Do" from that album. He also played drums on "Hello It's Me" and other songs on Todd Rundgren's gold album Something/Anything?.

== Death ==
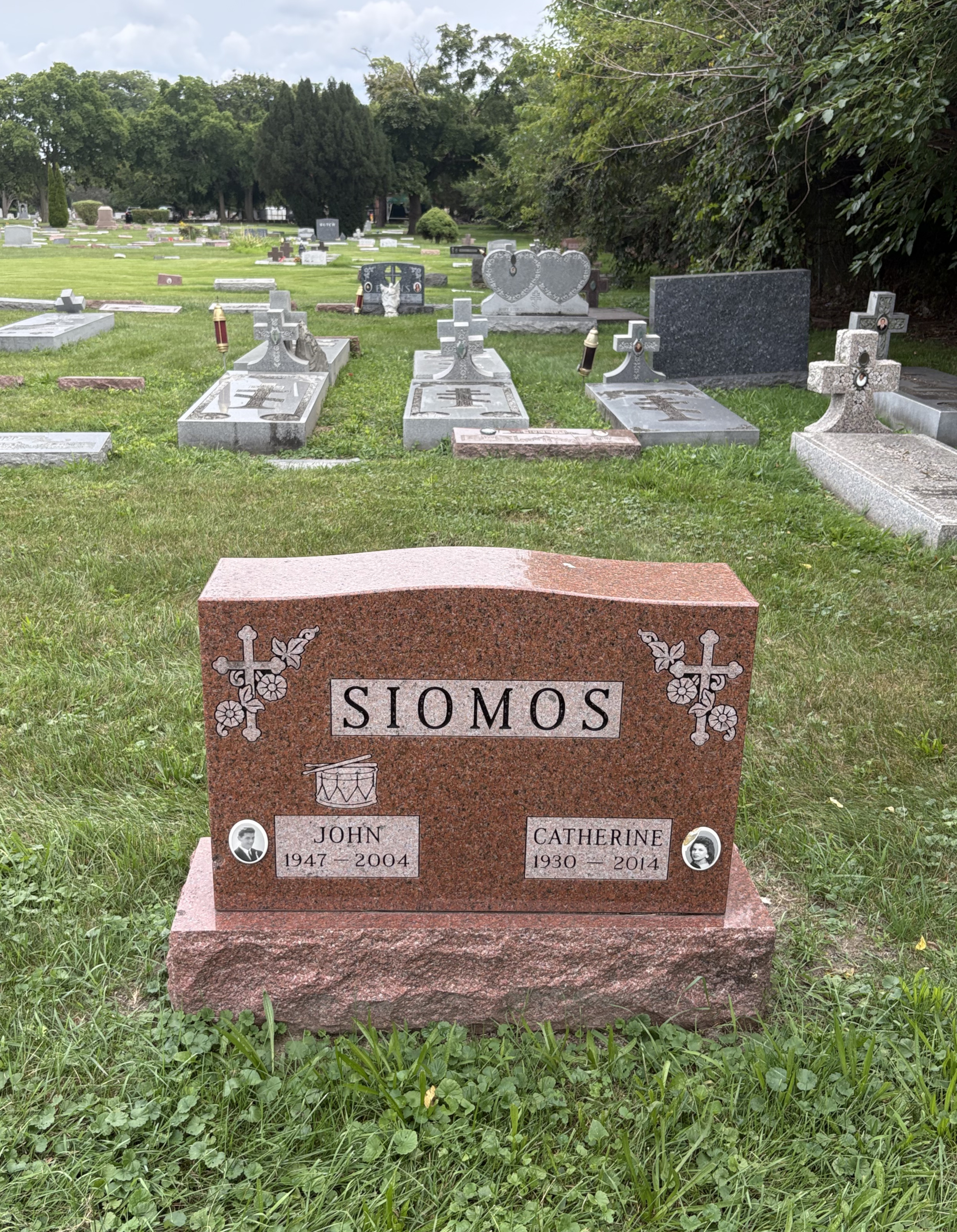
Siomos's grave at Elmwood Cemetery

Siomos died in Brooklyn of undisclosed causes on January 16, 2004. He is buried in Elmwood Cemetery, River Grove, Illinois.

== Performance credits ==
Year	Album	Artist	Credit
1971	Carly Simon	Carly Simon	drums
1971	Music	Buzzy Linhart	drums
1971	Mike Corbett & Jay Hirsh with Hugh McCracken	Mike Corbett & Jay Hirsh with Hugh McCracken	drums
1972	Moogy	Mark Klingman	drums
1972	Something/Anything?	Todd Rundgren	drums
1973	Frampton's Camel	Peter Frampton	drums
1973	A Wizard, a True Star	Todd Rundgren	drums
1974	Somethin's Happening	Peter Frampton	drums, percussion
1975	Frampton	Peter Frampton	drums, percussion
1975	Fingertips	Duster Bennett	drums
1975	Spring Fever	Rick Derringer	drums
1976	Frampton Comes Alive!	Peter Frampton	drums
1977	I'm in You	Peter Frampton	drums, tambourine, cabassa
1977	Other Side	Tufano & Giammarese (The Buckinghams)	drums
1978	Moogy II	Mark Moogy Klingman	drums, bg vocals
1979	Rogue Waves	Terry Reid	drums, percussion
1992	Shine On: A Collection	Peter Frampton	drums, percussion
1992	Through the Years	Guthrie Thomas	drums
1996	Rock and Roll Hoochie Koo: The Best of Rick Derringer	Rick Derringer	drums
1997	Very Best of Todd Rundgren	Todd Rundgren	drums
1998	This One's for Sarah	Guthrie Thomas	drums
2001	Buzzy Linhart Loves You: Classic Recordings	Buzzy Linhart	drums
2001	Frampton Comes Alive! (25th Anniversary Deluxe Edition)	Peter Frampton	drums
2002	All American Boy/Spring Fever	Rick Derringer	drums
2002	Tawny Tracks	Arrows	drums
2003	20th Century Masters: The Millennium Collection: The Best of Peter Frampton	Peter Frampton	drums, percussion
2003	Frampton Comes Alive! [DVD Audio/Bonus Videos]	Peter Frampton	drums
2003	Superstar Rock Festival	Various Artists	drums
2004	Spring Fever/Sweet Evil	Rick Derringer	drums
2005	Gold	Peter Frampton	drums, percussion
2008	Wind of Change/Frampton's Camel	Peter Frampton	drums
2008	Buzzy Linhart Is Music	Buzzy Linhart	drums
1970	Fulton Fish Market	James Late	drums
2008	Norman Feels	Norman Feels	drums
