= Taffy (song) =

Single by Lisa Loeb

from the album Tails
- Released: 1995
- Genre: Pop rock
- Label: Geffen
- Songwriter: Lisa Loeb

Lisa Loeb singles chronology
"Stay (I Missed You)" (1994)	"Taffy" (1995)	"Do You Sleep?" (1995)

"Taffy" is a song written and sung by Lisa Loeb. The song was recorded in 1995. It is featured on her album Tails, and her 2006 greatest hits album, The Very Best of Lisa Loeb.

The lyrics are addressed to a person who is habitually dishonest in dealing with others, with the line "Sometimes you tell the truth like you're pulling taffy" serving as an accusation of stretching the truth.

Although the song was not a very successful single, it was moderately successful on radio. It peaked at #6 on U.S. Billboard Bubbling Under The Hot 100 in early 1996, and the single's video was popular on VH1 and MTV. The song charted in the New Zealand RIANZ Top 40 at #39, #96 on the Australian singles chart and #61 in Canada.

== Charts ==
Chart performance for "Taffy"
Chart (1995)	Peak position
Australia (ARIA)	96
Canada Top Singles (RPM)	61
New Zealand (Recorded Music NZ)	39
US Bubbling Under Hot 100 Singles (Billboard)	12
