= Tails (album) =

Studio album by Lisa Loeb & Nine Stories
- Released: September 26, 1995
- Recorded: 1994–1995
- Studios: Juan's Apartment, New York City
- Genres: Alternative rock; acoustic rock
- Length: 43:49
- Label: Geffen
- Producers: Juan Patiño; Lisa Loeb

Lisa Loeb chronology
Purple Tape (1992)	Tails (1995)	Firecracker (1997)

Singles from Tails
- 1. "Stay (I Missed You)" Released: 1994; 2. "Taffy" Released: 1995; 3. "Do You Sleep?" Released: September 4, 1995; 4. "Waiting for Wednesday" Released: 1996

Professional ratings
Review scores
Source	Rating
AllMusic	3.5/5 stars
Texas Monthly	(neutral) Nov/95
People	(positive) 10/2/95
Rolling Stone Album Guide	2/5 stars
Entertainment Weekly	B−
Christgau's Consumer Guide	(neither)
Spin	4/10
Dayly Vault	C

Tails is the only album by Lisa Loeb & Nine Stories, released in 1995 by Geffen Records.

== Overview ==
Earlier versions of the songs "It's Over", "Snow Day", "Do You Sleep?", and "Hurricane" originally appeared on Loeb's previous studio album Purple Tape.

The single "Do You Sleep?" featured non-album b-side "Birds".

== Reception ==
Tails peaked at number thirty on the US Billboard 200, in the top ten in New Zealand, and number fifteen on the Canada Top Albums chart published by RPM. Overall the album charted in seven countries, making it a moderate success. Tails received a Gold certification in the United States after four months of its release with more than 500,000 pure copies sold in 1995.

As of 2013 the album has sold 727,000 copies in the US It was also certified Platinum in Canada with 100,000 copies sold.

Critics were also favorable to the album, with Ken Tucker of Entertainment Weekly, in particular, noting that "Loeb has an undeniable gift for creating an air of intimacy and vulnerability, which may well be enough for 'Stay' fans looking for additional doses of contemplative melancholy."

== Track listing ==
All tracks are written by Lisa Loeb.

No.	Title	Length
1.	"It's Over"	3:46
2.	"Snow Day"	3:54
3.	"Taffy"	3:18
4.	"When All the Stars Were Falling"	2:52
5.	"Do You Sleep?"	3:50
6.	"Hurricane"	4:53
7.	"Rose-Colored Times"	3:22
8.	"Sandalwood"	2:38
9.	"Alone"	2:59
10.	"Waiting for Wednesday"	3:09
11.	"Lisa Listen"	3:28
12.	"Garden of Delights"	2:36
13.	"Stay (I Missed You)"	3:04
Total length:		43:49

Japanese edition bonus track
No.	Title	Length
14.	"Sandalwood" (Band Version)	2:25

Australian edition bonus CD
No.	Title	Length
1.	"Birds"	2:52
2.	"Sandalwood" (Band Version)	2:27
3.	"Hurricane" ('Purple' Acoustic Cassette Version)	3:51
4.	"Do You Sleep" ('Purple' Acoustic Cassette Version)	3:50
5.	"Train Songs" ('Purple' Acoustic Cassette Version)	3:17

2026 2LP edition bonus tracks
No.	Title	Length
14.	"Birds"
15.	"Waiting For Wednesday" (Acoustic)
16.	"Sandalwood" (Full Band Version)
17.	"Stay" (Live Acoustic - VARA Radio)

== Personnel ==
Lisa Loeb & Nine Stories

- Lisa Loeb – lead and harmony vocals, acoustic guitar, additional electric guitars on tracks 9 and 10
- Tim Bright – electric guitars
- Joe Quigley – bass
- Jonathan Feinberg – drums, percussion, additional acoustic guitars on track 11

Additional musicians

- Juan Patiño – harmony vocals (all tracks), piano (track 2)
- Dan Seiden – additional electric guitars (tracks 5 and 9)
- Jesse Harris – acoustic guitar (track 8)
- Benjamin Loeb – string arrangements (tracks 1, 3, and 7)
- Dan Coleman – string arrangements (track 6)
- Eric Gaenslen – cello (tracks 1, 3, 6, and 7)
- Jennifer Frautschi – violin (track 1)
- Joseph Lin – violin (tracks 6 and 7)

== Charts ==
Chart performance for Tails
Chart (1995)	Peak position
Australian Albums (ARIA)	42
Canada Top Albums (RPM)	15
Dutch Albums (Album Top 100)	85
New Zealand Albums (RMNZ)	6
Scottish Albums (Official Charts)	67
Swedish Albums (Sverigetopplistan)	44
UK Albums (OCC)	39
US Billboard 200	30

== Certifications ==
Certifications for Tails
Region	Certification	Certified units/sales
Canada (Music Canada)	Platinum	100,000^{^}
Japan (RIAJ)	Platinum	200,000^{^}
New Zealand (RMNZ)	Gold	7,500^{^}
United States (RIAA)	Gold	500,000^{^}
^{^} Shipments figures based on certification alone.
