= Show Me the Way (Peter Frampton song) =

- Side A of 1976 UK live single

Single by Peter Frampton

from the album Frampton and Frampton Comes Alive!
- B-side: "The Crying Clown" "Shine On" (live)
- Released: June 1975; February 1976 (live)
- Recorded: August 1975 (live)
- Venue: Long Island Arena, Commack, New York
- Genre: Soft rock
- Length: 4:02 (album version); 3:25 (single edit); 4:32 (1976 live version)
- Label: A&M
- Songwriter: Peter Frampton
- Producer: Peter Frampton

Peter Frampton singles chronology
"Baby (Somethin's Happening)" (1974)	"Show Me the Way" (1975)	"Baby, I Love Your Way" (1975)
(I'll Give You) Money (1975)	Baby, I Love Your Way (1976)

"Show Me the Way" is a song by the English rock musician Peter Frampton. Originally released in June 1975 as the lead single from his fourth studio album Frampton, it gained popularity after being recorded live and released in February 1976 as the lead single from his live album Frampton Comes Alive! In the US, the song reached number 6 on the Billboard Hot 100 and number 10 on the UK Singles Chart, becoming his biggest US hit until "I'm in You" in 1977.

Cash Box said of the studio single that "Peter turns in a dynamic performance both instrumentally and vocally" and that "his highly emotive vocals are matched by some of his usually dexterous guitar playing". Record World said that "Frampton's voice and guitar are crisp and the song is a scintillating treat for the ears."

Like "Do You Feel Like We Do," another single from the Frampton Comes Alive! album, the song prominently features a talk box effects pedal.

== Track listing ==
=== 1975 release ===
7" vinyl - United States (1975)

1. "Show Me the Way" - 3:18
2. "The Crying Clown" - 4:05

=== Live version ===
7" vinyl - United States (1976)

1. "Show Me the Way" - 3:25
2. "Shine On" - 3:35

== Chart performance ==
=== Weekly charts ===
Chart (1975–2017)	Peak position
Australia (Kent Music Report)	25
Belgium (HUMO)	5
Belgium (Ultratop 50 Flanders)	1
Belgium (Ultratop 50 Wallonia)	5
Belgium (Ultratop Back Catalogue Flanders)	34
Canada Top Singles (RPM)	2
France (IFOP)	8
Netherlands (Single Tip 100)	1
Netherlands (Single Top 100)	1
New Zealand (Recorded Music NZ)	26
South Africa (Springbok Radio)	11
UK Singles (OCC)	10
US Billboard Hot 100	6
US Rock Singles Best Sellers (Billboard)	11
US Top 100 Singles (Cash Box)	4

=== Year-end charts ===
Chart (1976)	Position
Australia (Kent Music Report)	99
Canada Top Singles (RPM)	41
US Billboard Hot 100	50
US Top 100 Singles (Cash Box)	35

== Certifications ==
Region	Certification	Certified units/sales
United States (RIAA) Live version	Gold	500,000^{‡}
^{‡} Sales+streaming figures based on certification alone.

== Later versions ==
The American alternative rock band Dinosaur Jr recorded it as a bonus track on the 1987 album You're Living All Over Me. In May 2000, Peter Frampton revisited it in a performance with the Foo Fighters, on Late Show with David Letterman. It was also recorded in 2014 by Jake Kitchin for use as background music television commercials for Uncle Ben's Beginners rice. Frampton recorded the song again as a version for acoustic guitar for his 2016 CD Acoustic Classics.
