= Helen Childress =

American screenwriter

- Born: Tarrant County, Texas
- Occupation: Screenwriter
- Years active: 1990-present
- Notable work: Reality Bites

Helen Childress is an American screenwriter, best known for writing the 1994 film Reality Bites.

== Early life ==
Childress was born in Tarrant County, Texas, and raised in Missouri City, Texas. She graduated from the High School for Performing and Visual Arts in Houston, and attended the University of Southern California School of Cinema-Television.

== Career ==
Childress' screenplay Blue By You, which she wrote on spec in 1990, found its way to producer Michael Shamberg, who was impressed by her awareness of Generation X tropes. He was looking for a film about people in their 20s, and asked Childress to write one. She dropped out of USC to do so. She wrote and rewrote Reality Bites over the course of 3 years, generating 70 different drafts. Reality Bites was the first screenplay Childress wrote. She drew heavily on her own life, especially for the main character, Lelaina Pierce. She started writing it when she was 19 years old. The film was in development for three years, before Ben Stiller stepped in and got the project going, making it his debut as a director. The film starred Winona Ryder, Ethan Hawke, Stiller, Janeane Garofalo, and Steve Zahn. After Reality Bites, things were slow for Childress, as she harbored dreams of being a poet.

In 2011, it was announced that 20th Century Fox had acquired Childress' script The Mountain, a horror story based on characters from the Edith Wharton novel Summer, set in the early 1900s, with Ben Stiller to direct. Childress also wrote the scripts Mother's Confidential for Paramount and Allison's Starting To Happen for Warner Bros.

She created the TV series Model Woman in 2016, and her other major screenwriting credit is the 2019 television movie Escaping the Madhouse: The Nellie Bly Story. She has written for the TV series The Spanish Princess and Good Girls. She was nominated for a 2026 Easterseals Disability Arts & Culture Award for Best Scripted Series as co-executive producer of Pulse.

In 2013, it was reported that NBC was developing a half-hour comedy based on Reality Bites, with Stiller executive producing and Childress to write the pilot script. In 2022, it was reported that Reality Bites was being turned into a television series on Peacock, with Childress to write the episodes and executive produce.
