= Somethin's Happening =

Studio album by Peter Frampton
- Released: March 1974
- Studio: Olympic, London; Island, London; Headley Grange, Hampshire
- Genre: Rock
- Length: 41:43
- Label: A&M
- Producer: Peter Frampton

Peter Frampton chronology
| Frampton's Camel (1973) | Somethin's Happening (1974) | Frampton (1975) |

Professional ratings
Review scores
| Source | Rating |
|---|---|
| Allmusic | 3/5 stars |
| Encyclopedia of Popular Music | 2/5 stars |

Somethin's Happening is the third studio album by English musician Peter Frampton, released in 1974. It reached No. 125 on the US Billboard Top LPs & Tape chart.

== Background ==
Following the release of his previous album Frampton's Camel, keyboard player Mick Gallagher chose to leave the group, and for the next album Peter Frampton played keyboards (except on "Sail Away" and "Waterfall" played by Nicky Hopkins) in addition to his more customary guitar duties. Frampton retained British bassist Rick Wills, and drummer John Siomos (credited as John Headley-Down) for Somethin's Happening which was recorded, with Chris Kimsey engineering, at Olympic and Island Studios in London, and at Headley Grange in Hampshire, a former workhouse which had been previously used by Led Zeppelin for some of their notable recordings.

The Hipgnosis-designed album cover is notable for its freeze-frame photos of the band having buckets of water thrown in their faces. Sales of Somethin's Happening, like those of its predecessors, were disappointing. However, three of the eight songs from it appeared in energised concert performances from 1975 on the highly successful Frampton Comes Alive! album.

== Track listing ==
All tracks written by Peter Frampton except where noted.

Side one

1. "Doobie Wah" – 4:04 (Frampton, John Siomos, Rick Wills)
2. "Golden Goose" – 5:30
3. "Underhand" – 3:39
4. "I Wanna Go to the Sun" – 7:29

Side two

1. "Baby (Somethin's Happening)" – 4:46
2. "Waterfall" – 6:00
3. "Magic Moon (Da Da Da Da Da!)" – 3:49
4. "Sail Away" – 7:32

== Personnel ==
- Peter Frampton – electric guitar, acoustic guitar, guitar synthesizer, piano, organ, drums (track 7), percussion, lead vocals
- Rick Wills – bass, vocals
- John Siomos (credited as John Headley-Down) – drums, percussion

Additional personnel

- Nicky Hopkins – piano on tracks 6 and 8

== Charts ==
Album

| Year | Chart | Position |
|---|---|---|
| 1974 | Billboard 200 | 125 |
