= Reality Bites =

1994 film by Ben Stiller

- Theatrical release poster
- Directed by: Ben Stiller
- Written by: Helen Childress
- Produced by: Danny DeVito; Michael Shamberg
- Starring: Winona Ryder; Ethan Hawke; Ben Stiller; Janeane Garofalo; Steve Zahn; Swoosie Kurtz; Joe Don Baker; John Mahoney
- Cinematography: Emmanuel Lubezki
- Edited by: Lisa Churgin
- Music by: Karl Wallinger
- Production company: Jersey Films
- Distributed by: Universal Pictures
- Release dates: January 28, 1994 (Sundance); February 18, 1994
- Running time: 99 minutes
- Country: United States
- Language: English
- Budget: $11.5 million
- Box office: $41 million

Reality Bites is a 1994 American romantic comedy-drama film written by Helen Childress and directed by Ben Stiller in his feature directorial debut. It stars Winona Ryder, Ethan Hawke and Stiller, with supporting roles by Janeane Garofalo and Steve Zahn. The film follows aspiring videographer Lelaina Pierce, working on a documentary about the disenchanted lives of her friends and roommates.

Childress wrote the initial screenplay on spec in 1990, inspired by the lives of her friends and herself during the U.S. economic recession in the early 1990s. Stiller was hired as director in 1991 but later starred in the film after working with Childress on the final screenplay, which was completed in December 1992. The film faced production delays until Ryder committed to the project, after which Hawke and Zahn were cast. Garofalo was fired during filming but returned after Ryder stepped in on her behalf. Principal photography lasted 42 days in 1993, with filming taking place in Houston and Los Angeles.

Reality Bites premiered at the Sundance Film Festival on January 28, 1994, and was released theatrically on February 18, 1994 by Universal Pictures. The film received generally positive reviews from critics, with praise for the performances of Ryder, Hawke and Garofalo. It grossed $41 million worldwide against an $11.5 million budget. It appeared on some critics' year-end lists for 1994 and 1995 and has since gained cult status for its depiction of the early careers and young adult lifestyles of Generation X.

== Plot ==
Four friends who are recent college graduates live together in Houston, Texas. Coffeehouse guitarist Troy Dyer and budding filmmaker Lelaina Pierce are attracted to each other, although they have not acted on their feelings except for one brief, drunken encounter years ago. Troy is floundering, having lost several minimum-wage jobs—the last of which he loses for stealing a candy bar from his employer. Lelaina was valedictorian of her university and aspires to make documentaries, although initially has to settle for a position as production assistant to rude and obnoxious TV host Grant Gubler.

Lelaina meets Michael Grates when throwing a lit cigarette into his convertible causes him to crash into her car. They begin dating. He works as an executive at an MTV-like channel called In Your Face and after seeing a documentary she has been working on, wants to get it aired on his network.

Lelaina's roommate Vickie Miner has a series of one-night stands and short relationships with dozens of men; her promiscuity leads her to face a very real risk of contracting HIV after a former fling tests positive for the virus. Working as a sales associate for the Gap, Vickie is later promoted to manager and is content with her new job. Her friend Sammy Gray is gay; he remains celibate, not due to a fear of AIDS but because forming a relationship would force him to come out to his conservative parents.

After an impulsive act of retribution against Grant, Lelaina loses her job, which causes some tension with her roommates. Eventually, Vickie's HIV test comes back negative and Sammy comes out to his parents (and he even starts dating) and the two manage to resume their lives. Meanwhile, Lelaina's relationship with Michael dissolves after he helps her sell the documentary to his network, only to let them edit it into a stylized montage that compromises her artistic vision. Lelaina and Troy have a heart-to-heart which leads to them sleeping together and confessing their feelings. The morning after, he avoids her, and after a messy confrontation, leaves town. When Troy's father dies, it forces him to reevaluate his life, deciding to attempt a relationship with Lelaina.

Troy and Lelaina reunite and make amends once he returns from his father's funeral in Chicago. While we do not see what happens to Michael, during the credits there is an abrupt break where two characters, "Elaina" and "Roy", who are obvious parodies of Lelaina and Troy, have an argument about their relationship. As the "show's" credits roll, Michael's name is revealed as the creator, implying that he has turned the relationship between Lelaina and Troy into the subject of a new show on his network.

== Cast ==
- Winona Ryder as Lelaina Pierce
- Ethan Hawke as Troy Dyer
- Ben Stiller as Michael Grates
- Janeane Garofalo as Vickie Miner
- Steve Zahn as Sammy Gray
- Swoosie Kurtz as Charlane McGregor
- Harry O'Reilly as Wes McGregor
- Barry Del Sherman as Grant's producer
- Anne Meara as Louise
- Andy Dick as Rock
- Keith David as Roger
- David Pirner as Phineas
- Evan Dando as Actor "Roy"
- Karen Duffy as Actor "Elaina"
- Joe Don Baker as Tom Pierce
- John Mahoney as Grant Gubler

In addition to Garofalo, director Stiller gave cameos to Andy Dick (as a sleazy boss) and John F. O'Donohue (as a convenience store manager), both cast members of The Ben Stiller Show. Stiller also cast fellow Saturday Night Live alumnus David Spade in an uncredited appearance as the manager during Lelaina's job interview at Wienerschnitzel. Stiller's girlfriend Jeanne Tripplehorn also makes an uncredited appearance, parodying Cindy Crawford and MTV's show House of Style. Renée Zellweger appears as Tami, a one-night stand of Troy's. Soul Asylum's lead singer Dave Pirner and The Lemonheads' frontman Evan Dando also made cameos.

== Production ==
=== Development ===
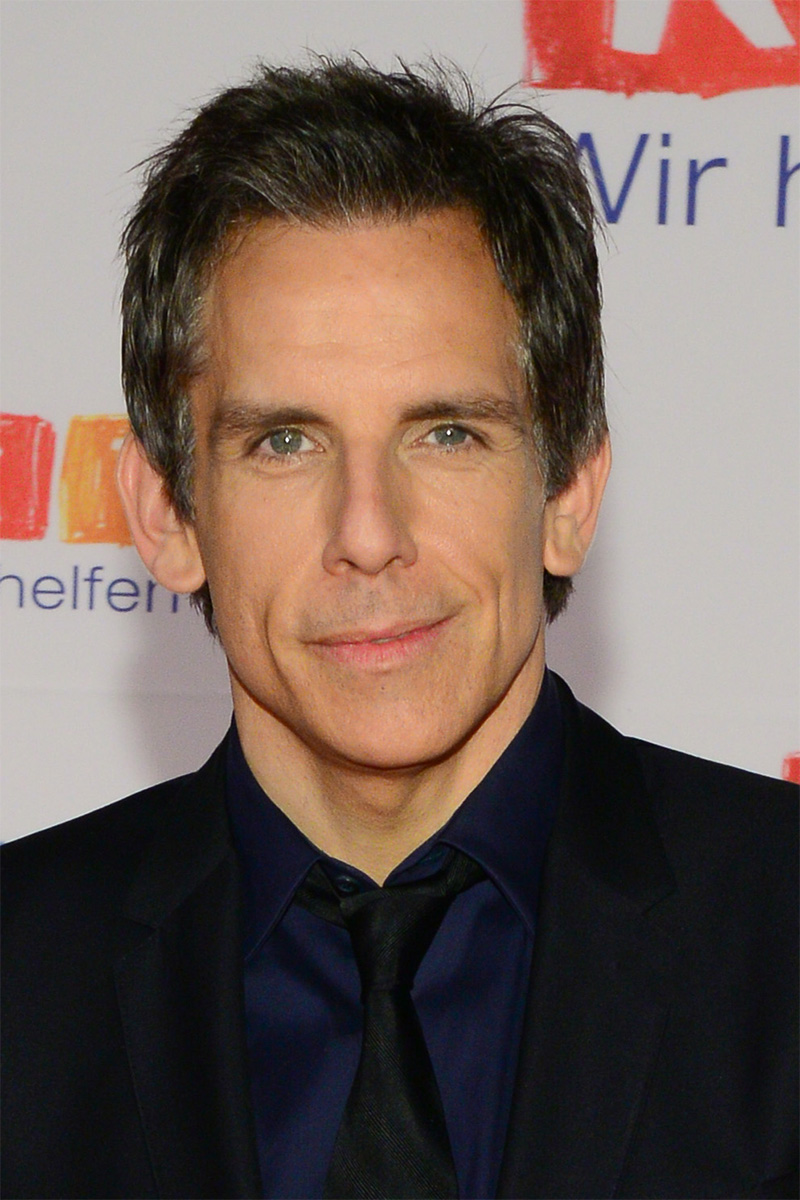
Ben Stiller's work in The Ben Stiller Show gave the film's producers the trust to allow him to direct the film.

In 1991, producer Michael Shamberg had an idea to make a film about people in their twenties. He had read a screenplay entitled Blue Bayou, written by Helen Childress on spec in 1990. He liked it and met with her and she proceeded to tell him about her life and friends, and their struggle to find work during a recession in the United States at the time. For three years, she wrote and rewrote Reality Bites, generating 70 different drafts. Childress decided to use her friends, their personalities and experiences as the basis for her film.

The film's producers saw the pilot episode for The Ben Stiller Show and approached Ben Stiller to direct it but not act in it. He signed on to direct in 1992 and worked with Childress for nine to ten months developing the script. Initially, Childress, working with producer Stacey Sher, had figured out the characters of Lelaina Pierce and Troy Dyer but could not come up with a credible character to complete the love triangle. Stiller suggested that he could play that third person. As a result, the Michael Grates character changed from a 35-year-old advertising executive trying to market Japanese candy bars in America to a television executive in his twenties. They also changed the structure of the film. Originally, Vickie Miner, Sammy Gray and Troy had more fleshed out storylines but Stiller felt that he could not tell them fully and decided to focus on the relationship between Lelaina and Troy.

By December 1992, Childress and Stiller had a script that was ready to be filmed for TriStar Pictures, but the studio put it into turnaround. Sher, Stiller and Childress managed to convince the Film Commission of Texas to fund a location scouting trip to Houston, despite no studio backing, no budget and no cast. The film had been turned down by all Hollywood studios because it tried to capture the Generation X market like Singles, which was not a box office success. When Sher, Stiller and Childress arrived in Houston, they received a phone call informing them that Winona Ryder had read the script, wanted to do it and that Universal Pictures had agreed to finance the film.

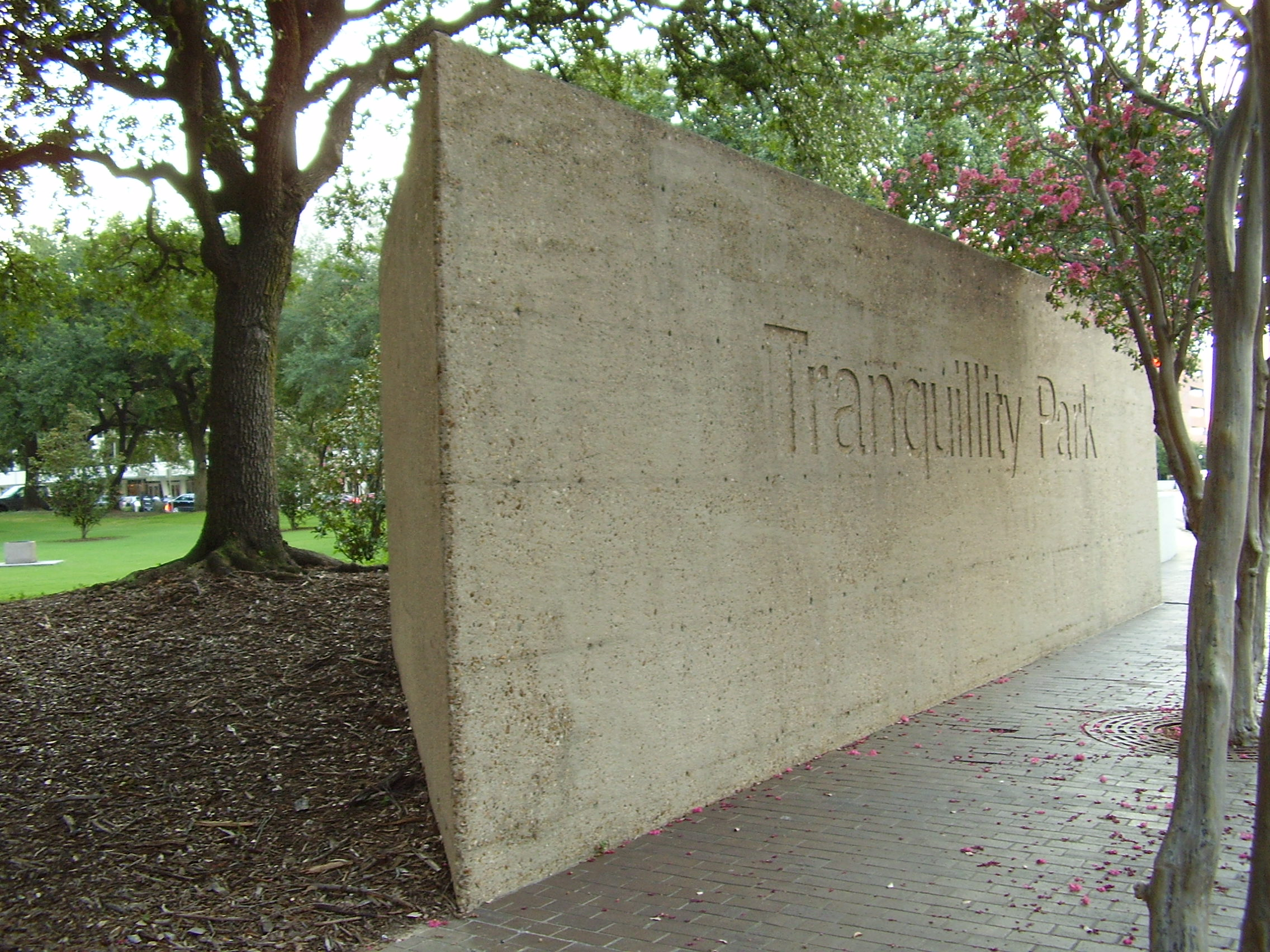
The film's exteriors were shot primarily in Houston, including Tranquillity Park.

After completing several period pieces, Ryder was drawn to Reality Bites because she was looking "for something a little more contemporary because I really wanted to wear blue jeans for a change". She read the script in one sitting while making The House of the Spirits and "found it very true to life." She further speculated in an interview, "I think my character is very close to what I would probably have ended up as if I hadn't become an actress". Ethan Hawke was at this point unhappy with the direction his career was taking; the actor recalled that his career was in a lull after the buzz from Dead Poets Society had faded. Ryder was a fan of his work and stipulated in her contract that her involvement in the film was dependent on Hawke starring opposite her.

Janeane Garofalo knew Stiller from working together on The Ben Stiller Show, and the film's producers felt that her style of comedy was perfect for the character of Vickie. She said that Parker Posey, Anne Heche and Gwyneth Paltrow were all up for the role. The studio wanted Paltrow but Ryder supported Garofalo for the role after making a connection with her. Before filming began, Garofalo was fired from the production because Stiller did not like her attitude during rehearsal. Garofalo was rehired after Ryder stepped in on her behalf. Garofalo stated later that she has a really poor work ethic and hates to rehearse. Stiller met Steve Zahn through Hawke, with whom Zahn was starring in a play, and he was impressed by how funny Zahn was. The actor went to Los Angeles, California, and tested for the film. He felt strongly about playing a gay character coming out of the closet.

According to Childress, the title of the film isn't meant to be interpreted as "reality sucks." During the run-up to the 1992 United States presidential election, Childress kept hearing references to "sound bites," which made her think of Lelaina's recorded vignettes of her friends as "little bites of reality."

=== Shooting ===
Principal photography lasted 42 days, on a budget of $11.5 million. The filmmakers shot many of the exteriors in Houston (including a scene on top of the Two Shell Plaza building), where the film is set, but most of the interiors were shot in Los Angeles, because it was cheaper to do so there. During filming, Stiller encouraged Childress to be on location and talk with the actors about their characters.

== Soundtrack ==
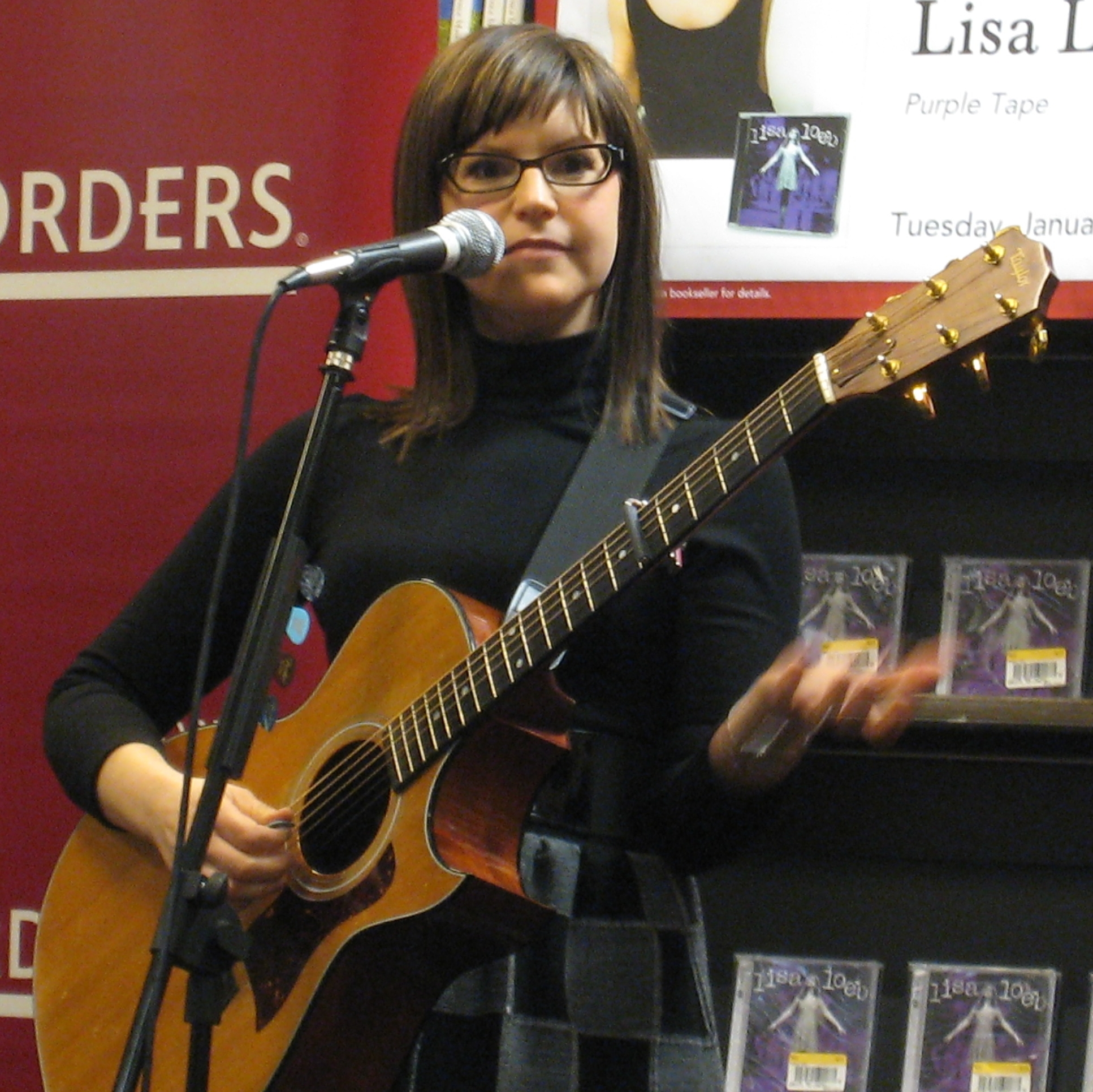
"Stay (I Missed You)" from the film's soundtrack launched the career of singer-songwriter Lisa Loeb

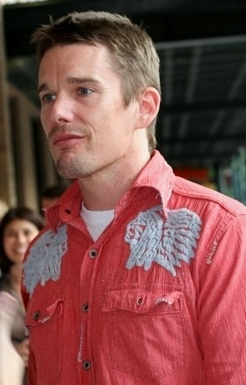
Star of the film Ethan Hawke, whose music also appears on the soundtrack

RCA Records met with the film's music supervisor Karyn Rachtman and Stiller three weeks into filming, to discuss the soundtrack album. They finalized a deal and the label opened its roster to the director, who picked only one band: Me Phi Me. RCA Records aggressively marketed the album and had five tracks on rotation on radio and MTV. The video for Crowded House's "Locked Out" was updated to include footage from the film. In addition, the video for "Spin the Bottle" by the Juliana Hatfield Three was directed by Stiller and featured clips from the film as well. The soundtrack sold 1.2 million units and reached #13 on the Billboard 200. The album also earned a Billboard Hot 100 No. 1 single with Lisa Loeb & Nine Stories' "Stay (I Missed You)". The soundtrack peaked at number 2 in Australia and was certified platinum.

The film's soundtrack includes songs by World Party, Squeeze, the Knack (a remixed version of "My Sharona" featured prominently in one scene from the film), Juliana Hatfield, Social Distortion and two contributions from Crowded House ("Locked Out" and "Something So Strong"), in addition to the runaway hit "Stay (I Missed You)" by Lisa Loeb, which earned Loeb the distinction of being the first artist to top the Hot 100 before being signed to any record label, and "Baby, I Love Your Way" by Big Mountain. It also includes "Conjunction Junction" from Schoolhouse Rock!, another song brought into the foreground of a film full of pop culture references.

== Release ==
Reality Bites went through four test screenings with a fairly decent reaction, before it premiered at the Sundance Film Festival in January 1994, and was theatrically released in the United States on February 18, 1994.

=== Box office ===
The film grossed $5.1 million in 1,149 theaters on its opening weekend. Initially, Reality Bites did not perform as well at the box office as the studio had hoped. In six weeks, it grossed $18.3 million, more than the film's $11 million production budget. Bruce Feldman, Universal Pictures' Vice President of Marketing, said, "The media labeled it as a Generation X picture, while we thought it was a comedy with broad appeal". The studio placed advertisements during programs chosen for their appeal to 12- to 34-year-olds and in interviews Stiller was careful not to mention the phrase, "Generation X". The film went on to be a moderate hit for Universal and make $20.9 million in the United States and Canada and $20 million internationally, for a worldwide total of $40.9 million.

=== Critical reception ===
The film received positive reviews. Review aggregator Rotten Tomatoes reports that 62% of 60 critics gave the film a positive review, with a rating average of 6.1/10. The site's consensus states: "Reality Bites may be too slick to fulfill its promise as a profound statement on Generation X, but an appealing ensemble and romantic sizzle make for an entertaining dive into the ennui of youth." On Metacritic the film has a score of 67 out of 100 based on reviews from 26 critics. Audiences surveyed by CinemaScore gave the film a grade B+ on scale of A to F.

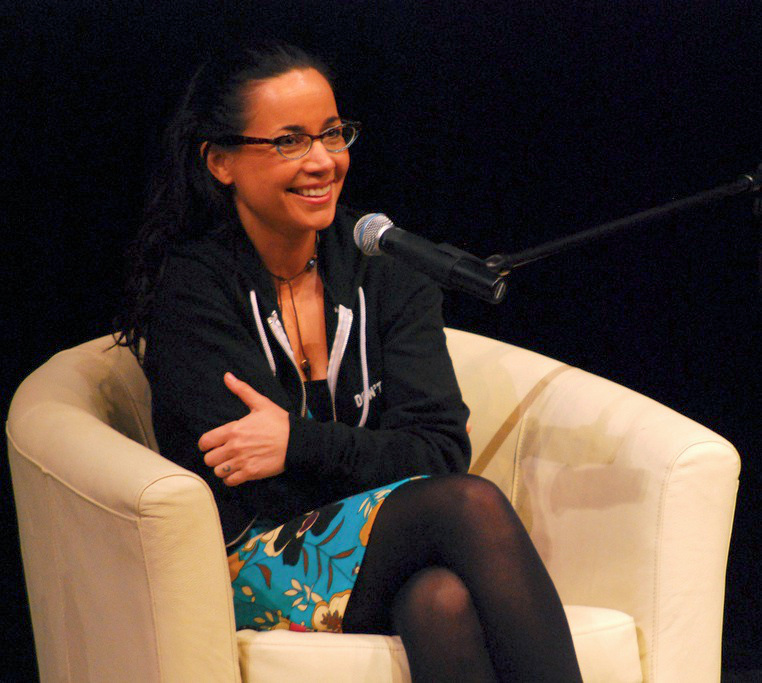
Janeane Garofalo in 2008

Caryn James in her review for The New York Times wrote, "Like the generation it presents so appealingly, it doesn't see any point in getting all bent out of shape and overambitious. But it knows how to hang out and have a great time". In his review for The Washington Post, Desson Howe wrote, "By aiming specifically—and accurately—at characters in their twenties, debuting screenwriter Helen Childress and first-time director Stiller achieve something even greater: they encapsulate an era". Time magazine's Richard Schickel wrote, "the movie bobs along on this stream of funny offhandedness, never losing its balance. If it's 10 o'clock, and you want to know where your supposedly grownup children are, this is a good place to look for them".

When asked in 2007 how well Reality Bites had aged, Janeane Garofalo replied, "I think it means a lot more to people younger than me. I was not the target audience. I was 29 playing a 21-year-old, so I don't think I understand why younger people like it."

In 2013, Stiller proposed a television series sequel.

The film is recognized by American Film Institute in these lists:

- 2002: AFI's 100 Years...100 Passions – Nominated

=== Year-end lists ===
- 4th – Scott Schuldt, The Oklahoman
- Honorable mention – Michael MacCambridge, Austin American-Statesman
- Honorable mention – David Elliott, The San Diego Union-Tribune

=== Home media ===
Reality Bites was released on VHS on July 13, 1994, by MCA/Universal Home Video. It was originally released on DVD, in a bare-bones edition, on July 21, 1998; a tenth anniversary edition - with special features including audio commentary, deleted scenes, and retrospective interviews - was released on June 8, 2004. A twentieth anniversary Blu-ray was released on April 15, 2014.

== Lawsuit ==
In 2005, a film financier named Troy Dyer sued writer Childress, producer Danny DeVito and director Stiller. Dyer claimed that screenwriter Childress stated on audio commentary tracks that she wrote the story based on her actual college friends and roommates and that he was then forced to deal with past and potential clients' "inquiries as to whether he was the fictional character" as well as internet users attributing outlandish, caustic, unprofessional and immature quotations lifted from the film's dialogue as being ideas and jargon of his own. The defendants attempted to seek shelter under California's anti-SLAPP statutes but in early 2007 the appeals court denied them SLAPP protection. The suit was quickly settled after Dyer received a written document from Childress stating he was not the person portrayed in the film.

== Television series ==
In August 2013, it was reported that a television series adaptation of the film is in the works at NBC with Childress and Stiller serving as executive producers with Universal Television. In May 2022, it was reported that a television series adaptation of the film is in the works at Peacock with Childress, DeVito, Sher, Jenna Bans, Michael Shamberg and Casey Kyber serving as executive producers.
