= Do You Feel Like We Do =

Single by Peter Frampton

from the album Frampton's Camel and Frampton Comes Alive!
- B-side: "Penny For Your Thoughts"
- Released: September 1976
- Recorded: 20 October 1973 (original studio version)
- Genre: Pop; rock
- Length: 6:44 (studio version); 14:15 (live version); 7:19 (live single edit)
- Label: A&M
- Songwriters: Peter Frampton; Mick Gallagher; Rick Wills; John Siomos
- Producer: Peter Frampton

Peter Frampton singles chronology
"Baby, I Love Your Way" (1975)	"Do You Feel Like We Do" (1976)	"I'm in You" (1977)

"Do You Feel Like We Do" is a song by English guitarist, singer and songwriter Peter Frampton. It was originally released on his 1973 studio album Frampton's Camel. The song later became one of the highlights during his live performances in the following years, and it was one of the three hit singles released from his signature 1976 live album Frampton Comes Alive!. The live version was recorded on 14 June 1975 at the Winterland Ballroom in San Francisco, California. This live version is featured in Guitar Hero 5 and as downloadable content in Rock Band 3. The studio version of the song is available as downloadable content for Rocksmith 2014.

== Writing and recording ==
The song was written and composed during the early 1970s with members of Frampton's band, then called "Frampton's Camel." It was then released on Frampton's 1973 studio album Frampton's Camel. This version was shorter than the live version (approximately 14 minutes), with the studio recording totaling 6 minutes and 44 seconds, and it was not released as a single.

The song title is "Do You Feel Like We Do," although the lyrics read, "Do you feel like I do?" Only after Bob Mayo's electric piano solo in the Frampton Comes Alive! version does Frampton sing, "Do you feel like we do?", but sings "Do you feel like I do?" through the talk box in the midst of his extended guitar solo.

After the lack of success of his band, Frampton performed under his own name and began touring the United States extensively for the next two years, supporting acts such as The J. Geils Band and ZZ Top, as well as performing his own shows at smaller venues. As a result, he developed a strong live following while his albums sold moderately and his singles failed to chart.

"Do You Feel Like We Do" became the closing number of his set and one of the highlights of his show. His concert version was considerably longer, with the version recorded on Frampton Comes Alive! alone exceeding 14 minutes, 4 of which are spent in the rock intro, 4 in the loud rock subito fortissimo outro, and 6 in the long, quiet bridge, featuring several instrumental solos utilizing Bob Mayo's electric piano and Frampton's guitar and talk box skills. Most famously of these were the aforementioned talk box solos, which were performed using an effects pedal that redirects a guitar's sound through a tube coming from the performer's mouth, allowing the guitar to mimic human speech, similarly to a vocoder. Inspiration for the talk box came from Frampton listening to the call letters of Radio Luxembourg. Following the success of the talk box solos, Frampton subsequently marketed such talk boxes under his own "Framptone" brand.

As a result of the strength of Frampton's live show, A&M Records decided to release a live album taped when Frampton performed at Winterland in San Francisco. The live version of "Do You Feel Like We Do", along with the bulk of what would ultimately be released as Frampton Comes Alive!, was captured during that performance. Frampton Comes Alive! was originally going to be a single album until Jerry Moss asked, "Where's the rest?"

== Release as a single ==
"Do You Feel Like We Do" was released as the third single from Frampton Comes Alive! in September 1976. On September 8, U.S. President Gerald Ford invited him to stay at the White House as a result of the success of Frampton Comes Alive! It was edited down extensively for the 45 RPM single and promo single for pop radio stations, but this version was still seven minutes long. Many radio stations were known to edit the song down even further, to make it fit into the then-tightly programmed AM radio formats. It reached number 10 on the US pop charts and number 39 in the UK, making it one of the longest songs to reach the US top 10.

Record World said that it "is the third single from the Frampton Comes Alive! LP and is shaping up as [Frampton's] biggest yet!"

== Personnel ==
Personnel taken from Frampton's Camel liner notes.

- Peter Frampton – vocals, guitar
- Mick Gallagher – Wurlitzer electric piano, vocals
- Rick Wills – bass
- John Siomos – drums

== Other performances ==
Frampton continues to play this song live to close his concerts, and he played the song in his solo spot while playing with Ringo Starr & His All-Starr Band in 1997 and 1998 with a piano solo of Gary Brooker bass solo of Jack Bruce and the version length was about 19 minutes. The Simpsons episode "Homerpalooza" featured the song with the London Symphony Orchestra supporting Frampton.

Frampton appeared in a 2009 Geico commercial (part of their series coupling an actual Geico customer with a celebrity), playing talk box guitar commentary with a woman describing her auto accident and Geico's help in getting a settlement. Frampton closed the commercial with an improv riff from the song.

Frampton plays the opening notes of the song for a 2012 TV commercial for the 2012 Buick Verano.

In 2021, Rick Beato interviewed Frampton and analyzed this song in the 100th episode of "What Makes This Song Great?".

In March 2025, he played almost 7 minutes of the song on The Late Show with Stephen Colbert.

== Chart history ==
=== Weekly charts ===
Chart (1976–77)	Peak position
Canada RPM Top Singles	7
New Zealand	33
UK (OCC)	37
US Billboard Hot 100	10
US Cash Box Top 100	13

=== Year-end charts ===
Chart (1976)	Rank
Canada	85
US Cash Box Top 100	99

== Notable covers ==
A cover by Warren Haynes is included on the iTunes deluxe edition of Frampton Comes Alive!

American rock band Tesla covered the song for their 2007 album Real to Reel, Vol. 2. This album is the second part of the band's covers album Real to Reel.
