= Baby, I Love Your Way =

1975 single by Peter Frampton

- Side A of UK vinyl single

Single by Peter Frampton

from the album Frampton and Frampton Comes Alive!
- B-side: "It's a Plain Shame"
- Released: September 1975; June 1976 (live)
- Recorded: 1975
- Studio: Ronnie Lane's Mobile Studio (Clearwell Castle, Gloucestershire)
- Genre: Arena rock; soft rock
- Length: 4:43; 3:31 (7-inch version)
- Label: A&M (1832)
- Songwriter: Peter Frampton
- Producer: Peter Frampton

Peter Frampton singles chronology
"Show Me the Way" (1975)	"Baby, I Love Your Way" (1975)	"Do You Feel Like We Do" (1976)

Live video
- "Baby, I Love Your Way" (live at the Royal Albert Hall, 2022) on YouTube
- "Baby, I Love Your Way" (live, 1975) on YouTube

Official audio
- "Nassau/Baby, I Love Your Way" on YouTube
- "Baby, I Love Your Way" (from Frampton Comes Live!) on YouTube

"Baby, I Love Your Way" is a song written and performed by English singer Peter Frampton, released as a single in September 1975. It first featured on Frampton's fourth album, Frampton (1975), where it segues from the previous track "Nassau".

A live version of the song was later released on his 1976 multi-platinum album Frampton Comes Alive!, where it gained popularity as a hit song, peaking at number 12 on the US Billboard Hot 100. It also reached number three in Canada.

Billboard described the live version as an "easy rocker" and said that the portion of the song where Frampton sings the title lyrics made "an effective hook." Cash Box called it "an excellent tune" explaining that "primarily, this is an acoustic tune, and Frampton sings with sensitivity over the soft backing." Record World said that although the studio single released the prior year didn't sell well, "this single is...headed for the top."

In 2017, Frampton discussed this song while talking to lawmakers in Washington, D.C. about inequitable revenue payments from streaming music services like iTunes and Spotify. "For 55 million streams of 'Baby I Love Your Way', I got $1,700," said Frampton. "Their jaws dropped and they asked me to repeat that for them."

== Track listing ==
- 7-inch single – United States (1975)
1. "Baby, I Love Your Way" – 3:17 (Edited from the LP version that runs 4:43)
2. "(I'll Give You) Money" – 4:35

=== Live version ===
- 7-inch single – United States (1976)
1. "Baby, I Love Your Way" – 3:28 (Edited from the LP version that runs 4:43)
2. "It's a Plain Shame" – 4:21

== Charts ==
=== Weekly charts ===
Chart (1975–1976)	Peak position
Australia (KMR)	65
Brazil (IBOPE)	8
Canada (RPM)	3
Ireland (IRMA)	14
New Zealand (RIANZ)	27
UK Singles (OCC)	43
US Billboard Hot 100	12
US Adult Contemporary (Billboard)	28

=== Year-end charts ===
Chart (1976)	Rank
Canada (RPM)	47
US Billboard Hot 100	89
US Cash Box Top 100	99

== Certifications ==
Region	Certification	Certified units/sales
United Kingdom (BPI)	Platinum	600,000^{‡}
United States (RIAA) Live version	Platinum	1,000,000^{‡}
^{‡} Sales+streaming figures based on certification alone.

== Will to Power version ==
The American neo-disco group Will to Power recorded a medley of "Baby, I Love Your Way" and "Free Bird", which reached No. 1 in the US.

== Big Mountain version ==
"Baby, I Love Your Way"

Single by Big Mountain

from the album Unity and Reality Bites: Original Motion Picture Soundtrack
- B-side: "Baby, te quiero a tí" (Spanish version)
- Released: 1 February 1994
- Genre: Reggae; pop
- Length: 4:09 (album version); 4:28 (radio version)
- Label: Giant; RCA; BMG
- Songwriter: Peter Frampton
- Producer: Ron Fair

Big Mountain singles chronology
"Reggae Inna Summertime" (1993)	"Baby, I Love Your Way" (1994)	"I Would Find a Way" (1995)

American reggae/pop band Big Mountain released a cover of "Baby, I Love Your Way" in February 1994, which appeared on the soundtrack of the film Reality Bites, starring Winona Ryder, Ethan Hawke and Ben Stiller. This version, released via Giant, RCA and BMG, achieved major worldwide success, reaching numbers two and six on the US Cash Box Top 100 and Billboard Hot 100 charts, respectively, and number two on the UK Singles Chart. The single reached the top 10 in many countries across Europe, including topping the charts of Denmark, Spain, and Sweden. It also reached the top five in Australia and New Zealand, as well as in Canada, where it peaked at number two. The accompanying music video for the song was directed by Matti Leshem and premiered in April 1994.

=== Critical reception ===
Larry Flick from Billboard magazine reviewed the song favorably, calling it an "earthy rendition" that is "right in the pocket of current trends." Dr. Bayyan from Cash Box wrote, "This song deals with the beauty of the subject that the group is focusing on. The lyrics are very intense and spiritual and are enhanced by the raw string and wind instruments which captivate the imagination." Fell and Rufer from the Gavin Report noted that this cover "has teeth" and "could be big." Pan-European magazine Music & Media commented, "Another '70s pop classic has come out of the reggae grinder to enjoy its second youth in the '90s. Peter Frampton wrote it, not knowing that one day it would appear in the Reality Bites film." Alan Jones from Music Week gave it a score of four out of five, adding that "this is a lightweight reggae cover", and it "is definitely in a summery mood." In Smash Hits, it was named Best New Single with five out of five by E.Y.C..

=== Track listing ===
- CD single – Europe (1994)
1. "Baby, I Love Your Way" – 4:28
2. "Baby, I Love Your Way" (6 Point 6 on the Richter Scale mix) – 6:54
3. "Baby, te quiero a tí" – 4:40

=== Personnel ===
- Quino – lead and backing vocals
- Tony Chin – guitar
- Warren Hill – alto saxophone
- Abraham Laboriel – bass guitar
- Aaron Zigman – rhythm track arrangement, programming, and keyboards
- John Goux – acoustic guitar
- Steve Forman – percussion
- John Robinson, Abraham Laboriel, Jr. – drums
- Larry Williams – flute, tenor saxophone
- Jerry Hey – trumpet
- Bill Reichenbach Jr. – trombone
- Erik Hansen – additional programming
- James McWhinney – background vocals
- Ron Fair – producer, arranger, engineer, "Duane Eddy" guitar
- Tom Lord-Alge – mixing
- Dave Betancourt – assistant mix engineer
- Jeff Aldrich – executive producer

=== Charts ===
==== Weekly charts ====
Chart (1994–1995)	Peak position
Australia (ARIA)	4
Austria (Ö3 Austria Top 40)	4
Belgium (Ultratop 50 Flanders)	7
Canada Top Singles (RPM)	2
Canada Adult Contemporary (RPM)	12
Denmark (IFPI)	1
Europe (Eurochart Hot 100)	1
Europe (European AC Radio)	2
Europe (European Hit Radio)	2
Finland (Suomen virallinen lista)	13
France (SNEP)	7
Germany (GfK)	9
Iceland (Íslenski Listinn Topp 40)	2
Ireland (IRMA)	7
Israel (Israeli Singles Chart)	15
Netherlands (Dutch Top 40)	4
Netherlands (Single Top 100)	4
New Zealand (Recorded Music NZ)	12
Norway (VG-lista)	6
Scottish Singles Sales (Official Charts)	5
Spain (AFYVE)	1
Sweden (Sverigetopplistan)	1
Switzerland (Schweizer Hitparade)	2
UK Singles (Official Charts)	2
UK Airplay (Music Week)	1
Uruguay (UPI)	10
US Billboard Hot 100	6
US Adult Contemporary (Billboard)	10
US Hot Latin Tracks (Billboard) "Baby te quiero a ti"	19
US Top 40/Mainstream (Billboard)	1
US Top 40/Rhythm-Crossover (Billboard)	8
US Cash Box Top 100	2

Chart (2021)	Peak position
Poland Airplay (ZPAV)	64

==== Year-end charts ====
Chart (1994)	Position
Australia (ARIA)	19
Austria (Ö3 Austria Top 40)	24
Belgium (Ultratop)	38
Canada Top Singles (RPM)	28
Canada Adult Contemporary (RPM)	94
Europe (Eurochart Hot 100)	18
Europe (European Hit Radio)	5
France (SNEP)	24
Germany (Media Control)	35
Iceland (Íslenski Listinn Topp 40)	18
Netherlands (Single Top 100)	49
New Zealand (RIANZ)	18
Sweden (Topplistan)	20
Switzerland (Schweizer Hitparade)	14
UK Singles (OCC)	30
UK Airplay (Music Week)	2
US Billboard Hot 100	21
US Adult Contemporary (Billboard)	31
US Cash Box Top 100	9

=== Certifications ===
Region	Certification	Certified units/sales
Australia (ARIA)	Platinum	70,000^{^}
Denmark (IFPI Danmark)	Gold	45,000^{‡}
New Zealand (RMNZ)	3× Platinum	90,000^{‡}
Spain (Promusicae)	Gold	30,000^{‡}
United Kingdom (BPI)	Silver	200,000^{^}
United States (RIAA)	Gold	500,000^{^}
^{^} Shipments figures based on certification alone.^{‡} Sales+streaming figures based on certification alone.

=== Release history ===
Region	Date	Format(s)	Label(s)	Ref.
Europe	1 February 1994	CD	RCA; BMG	
Japan	21 April 1994	Mini-CD	RCA; BMG	
Australia	16 May 1994	CD; cassette	RCA; BMG	
United Kingdom	23 May 1994	7-inch vinyl; CD; cassette	RCA; BMG	

== Walter Jackson version ==
American soul ballad singer Walter Jackson released a cover of the song in 1977. It reached number 19 on the US R&B chart.
