= Wind of Change (album) =

Studio album by Peter Frampton
- Released: 26 May 1972 (UK); 10 July 1972 (US)
- Recorded: October 1971 – April 1972
- Studio: Olympic, London; Island, London
- Genre: Hard rock
- Label: A&M
- Producer: Peter Frampton; Chris Kimsey

Peter Frampton chronology
Wind of Change (1972)	Frampton's Camel (1973)

Professional ratings
Review scores
Source	Rating
AllMusic	4/5 stars
Christgau's Record Guide	B−
Encyclopedia of Popular Music	3/5 stars
The Rolling Stone Record Guide	4/5 stars

Wind of Change is the debut studio album by English guitarist and singer Peter Frampton, released in 1972 by A&M. The album features appearances by Ringo Starr, Billy Preston and Klaus Voormann.

== Background ==
Peter Frampton decided to remain with Humble Pie's U.S. label A&M, and assembled a supporting cast including Ringo Starr, Billy Preston, Spooky Tooth members Mick Jones and Mike Kellie, and former Herd member Andy Bown, for Wind of Change, his first solo effort following his departure from Humble Pie in 1971.

The self-produced debut album was engineered by Chris Kimsey, who had worked on Humble Pie's 1971 album Rock On. Frampton and Kimsey together introduced a melodic sensibility that contrasted with the raucous boogie that characterized the Humble Pie sound, with a particular emphasis on Frampton's acoustic guitar work. Kimsey continued to work with Frampton on the production of his albums throughout the 1970s.

Many of the songs on Wind of Change are built primarily around acoustic guitar foundations, but the inclusion of such songs as "It's a Plain Shame", and "All I Want To Be (Is By Your Side)" have a hard rock edge, as does an extended reworking of the Rolling Stones "Jumpin' Jack Flash", which was the project's only non-Frampton composition. The brass arrangements in this latter song and "The Lodger", performed by Jim Price, are strongly reminiscent of that in the Rolling Stones' song "Bitch", recorded the previous year, in which Price participated.

== Track listing ==
All tracks written by Peter Frampton except where noted.

Side One

1. "Fig Tree Bay" – 3:36
2. "Wind of Change" – 3:05
3. "Lady Lieright" – 2:56
4. "Jumpin' Jack Flash" (Mick Jagger, Keith Richards) – 5:20
5. "It's a Plain Shame" – 3:14
6. "Oh for Another Day" – 3:53

Side Two

1. "All I Wanna Be (Is By Your Side)" – 6:36
2. "The Lodger" – 5:44
3. "Hard" – 4:30
4. "Alright" – 4:26

== Personnel ==
- Peter Frampton – lead vocals, lead guitar, acoustic guitar, Hammond organ, keyboards, drums, percussion, dulcimer, harmonium

=== Additional personnel ===
- Frank Carillo – guitar (2, 4, 5, 8), backing vocals (3), rhythm guitar (10)
- Mick Jones – rhythm guitar on "All I Wanna Be (Is By Your Side)"
- Andy Bown – bass (3, 4, 8, 9), Hammond organ (3), Mellotron, percussion (7), electric piano, (tr. 9), percussion, backing vocals (tr.10)
- Rick Wills – bass (1, 5, 7)
- Klaus Voormann – bass on "Alright"
- Billy Preston – piano, Hammond organ on "Alright"
- Mike Kellie – drums, percussion (1, 4, 5, 7)
- Ringo Starr – drums on "Alright" and "The Lodger"
- Chris Karan – congas on "Lady Lieright"
- Frank Ricotti – shaker on "Lady Lieright"
- Del Newman – strings arrangements, flute, marimba
- Jim Price – brass on "The Lodger"

=== Production ===
- Peter Frampton, Chris Kimsey – production, engineering

== Charts ==
Album

Year	Chart	Position
1972	US Pop Albums	177

Single

Year	Single
1972	"Jumpin' Jack Flash"
1972	"It's A Plain Shame"
