= Frampton's Camel =

Studio album by Peter Frampton
- Released: May 1973
- Studios: Electric Lady, New York City; Olympic, London
- Genre: Rock
- Length: 37:18
- Label: A&M
- Producer: Peter Frampton

Peter Frampton chronology
Wind of Change (1972)	Frampton's Camel (1973)	Somethin's Happening (1974)

Professional ratings
Review scores
Source	Rating
AllMusic	4.5/5 stars
Christgau's Record Guide	B−
Encyclopedia of Popular Music	3/5 stars
The Rolling Stone Album Guide	3/5 stars

Frampton's Camel is the second studio album by English musician and songwriter Peter Frampton, recorded and released in 1973. It was the first album that Frampton recorded in the United States. Most of the album was written in New York City. It reached No. 110 on the US Billboard Top LPs & Tape chart.

== Background ==
Peter Frampton pursued a grittier sound on his album Frampton's Camel. It was recorded at Jimi Hendrix's old Electric Lady Studios. Four years later, Frampton would record there again for I'm in You.

The album shared its name with the band Frampton assembled in 1972, which was more of a group project, including bassist Rick Wills, new drummer John Siomos, and keyboardist Mick Gallagher. In fact, early editions of the LP, eight-track and cassettes all listed and denoted the album as Frampton's Camel by Frampton's Camel.

== Track listing ==
All tracks composed by Peter Frampton; except where indicated

Side One

1. "I Got My Eyes on You" – 4:29
2. "All Night Long" – 3:19 (Frampton, Mick Gallagher)
3. "Lines on My Face" – 4:50
4. "Which Way the Wind Blows" – 3:32
5. "I Believe (When I Fall in Love It Will Be Forever)" – 4:10 (Stevie Wonder, Yvonne Wright)

Side Two

1. "White Sugar" – 3:37
2. "Don't Fade Away" – 4:39
3. "Just the Time of Year" – 3:58
4. "Do You Feel Like We Do" – 6:44 (Frampton, Mick Gallagher, Rick Wills, John Siomos)

== Personnel ==
- Peter Frampton – electric and acoustic guitars, drums, piano, Wurlitzer electric piano, Hammond organ, Hohner clavinet, vocals
- Mick Gallagher – piano, Wurlitzer electric piano, Hammond organ, Hohner clavinet, vocals
- Rick Wills – bass
- John Siomos – drums, percussion

=== Additional personnel ===
- Frank Carillo – acoustic and electric guitars, backing vocals
- Eddie Kramer, Chris Kimsey, Dave Wittman, Doug Bennett – recording and mixing engineers

== Charts ==
Album

Year	Chart	Position
1973	US Pop Albums	110

Single

Year	Single
1973	"All Night Long"
1973	"I Got My Eyes On You"
1973	"Lines On My Face"
1973	"Which Way The Wind Blows"
