= Big Mountain (band) =

American reggae band

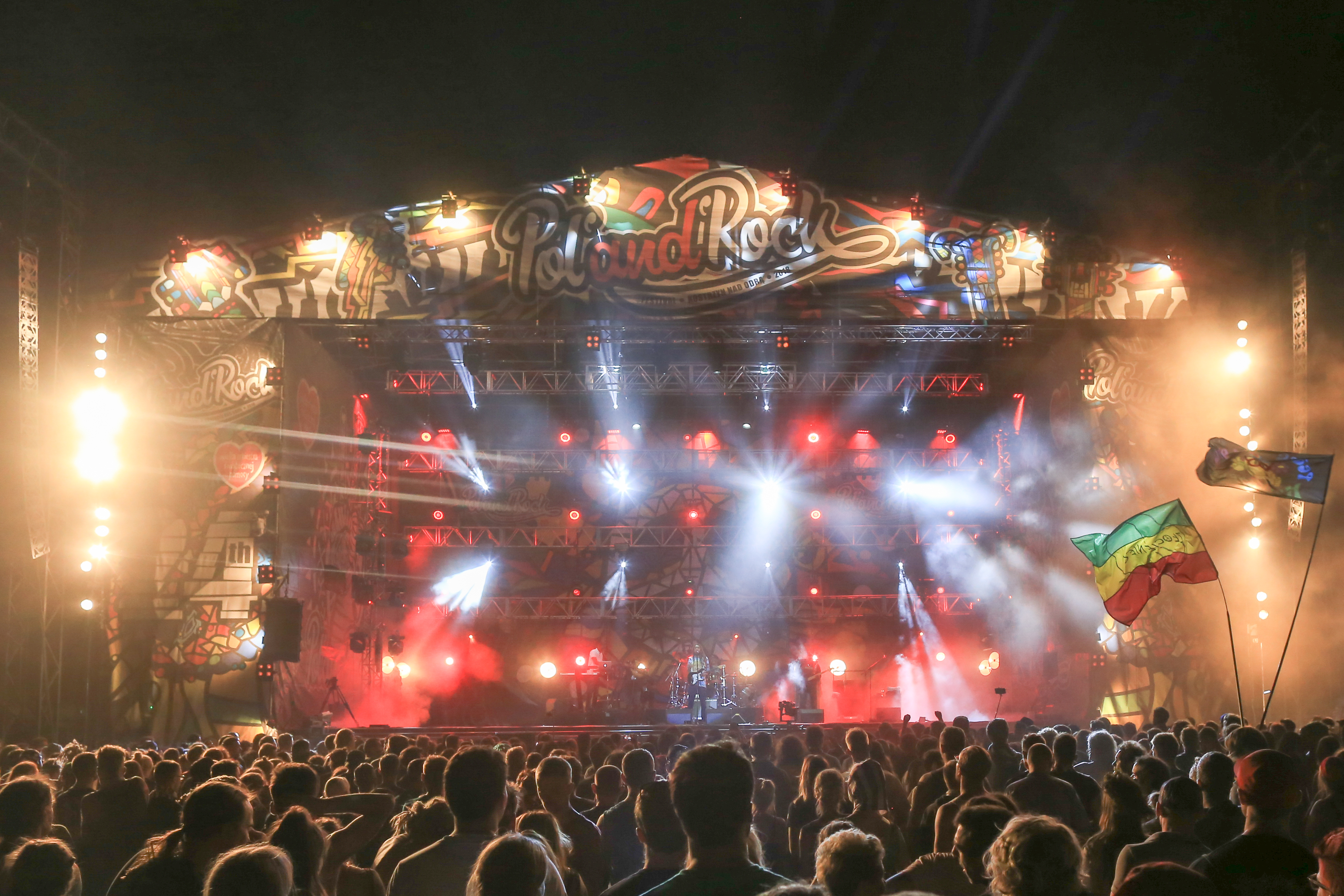
- Pol'and'Rock Festival 2018

Background information
- Also known as: Shiloh
- Origin: San Diego, California, United States
- Genre: Reggae
- Years active: 1988–present
- Labels: Giant; Pony Canyon; White Sage
- Members: Joaquin "Quino" McWhinney; Michael Hyde; Paul "Groove Galore" Kastick; Richard "Goofy" Campbell; Reggie Griffin; Daniel Lopilato; Andre Sias; Luis Castillo; Jakob McWhinney; Michael Ortiz; James McWhinney
- Past members: Lynn Copeland; Gregory Blakney; Jerome Cruz; Manfred Reinke; Lance Rhodes; Tony Chin; Billy "Bones" Stoll; Carlton "Santa" Davis; Carlos Arias; Stephen Kamada/Tim Pacheco
- Website: bigmountainband.com

Big Mountain is an American reggae band formed in 1986 in San Diego, California by vocalist Joaquin "Quino" McWhinney. The band gained wide recognition and became known for its cover of Peter Frampton's "Baby, I Love Your Way", which became a top 10 hit single in the US in early 1994, reaching No. 6 on the US Billboard Hot 100, No. 1 on the Mainstream Top 40 and No. 2 in the UK.

== History ==
The evolution of the Big Mountain band started in 1986 as the San Diego, California reggae band Rainbow Warriors. In 1988, future Big Mountain frontman Joaquin "Quino" (pronounced Keeno) McWhinney joined as the lead singer of the band Shiloh. Quino is of Mexican/Irish heritage, and several members of his family were mariachi musicians. His interest in reggae began after seeing a documentary about Bob Marley and Rastafari. In 1989, Shiloh secured their first record deal and put out one album titled California Reggae. In 1991, the band changed the name to Big Mountain which was the name of a Native American reservation in Arizona. The original line-up was a sextet consisting of Quino (vocals), Lynn Copeland (bass), Gregory Blakney (drums), Jerome Cruz (guitar), Manfred Reinke (keyboards), and Lance Rhodes (drums).

The band first reached the charts with the song "Touch My Light" in spring 1993, a song taken from their debut album Wake Up. Prior to the band recording their second album, Unity, in 1993, Blakney, Cruz, Reinke, and Rhodes all departed the band, with McWhinney and Copeland finding replacements in Jamaican duo Tony Chin (guitar) and Carlton "Santa" Davis (drums), along with keyboard players Michael Hyde and Billy "Bones" Stoll, and percussionist James McWhinney. Following this lineup change, the band went on to receive major airplay on mainstream radio stations. "Baby, I Love Your Way" was included on the soundtrack for the film Reality Bites, and peaked at No. 6 on the Billboard Hot 100 and No. 2 on the UK Singles Chart, and its follow-up, "Sweet Sensual Love" reached No. 51 in the UK, whilst Unity went on to sell over a million copies worldwide. Big Mountain's follow up single "Get Together" became a top five hit in Brazil and Norway.

The band appeared at both the 1994 and 1995 Reggae Sunsplash festivals in Jamaica. In 1998 Jamaican drummer/producer Paul "Groove Galore" Kastick replaced Carlton "Santa" Davis as full-time drummer and primary producer in the group. Kastick spearheaded the production on the next six Big Mountain albums, spanning from 1998 and 2007. After 10 consecutive years of touring, Big Mountain decided to take a break in 2005. During this time, Quino McWhinney became a high school teacher at Olympian High School. During the period between 2005 and 2013, Big Mountain would occasionally reunite for primarily international live performances and various benefit causes. In 2013, Quino, Hyde, and Kastick reformed the band with an extended lineup including Carlos Arias (bass), Richard "Goofy" Campbell (keyboards), Reggie Griffin (guitar, saxophone), Stephen Kamada (guitar), Danny Lopilato (guitar, vocals), Tim Pacheco (percussion, vocals). Further lineup changes have ensued, and the band now consists of Quino and James Mcwhinney, Paul Kastick, Goofy Campbell, Chizzy Chisholm and Michael (Mikey) Ortiz. In May 2016 the band released their first album in 14 years, Perfect Summer.

== Band members ==
Current members

- Joaquin "Quino" McWhinney – vocals, guitar (1988–present)
- Paul "GrooveGalore" KasticK – drums (1998–present)
- Richard "Goofy" Campbell – keyboards (1999–present)
- Audley Chisholm – guitar, vocals (2013–present)
- Michael Ortiz – bass (2013–present)
- James McWhinney – vocals, percussion (2013–present)

Former members

- Lynn Copeland – bass (1988–1995)
- Gregory Blakney – drums (1988–1992)
- Jerome Cruz – guitar (1988–1993)
- Manfred Reinke – keyboards (1988–1993)
- Lance Rhodes – drums (1988–1995)
- James McWhinney – percussion, vocals (1994–current)
- Tony Chin – guitar (1994–2002)
- Billy "Bones" Stoll – keyboards (1994–1997)
- Carlton "Santa" Davis – drums (1994–1998)
- Carlos Arias – bass (2013)
- Stephen Kamada – guitar (2013)
- Tim Pacheco - vocals, percussion (2016)

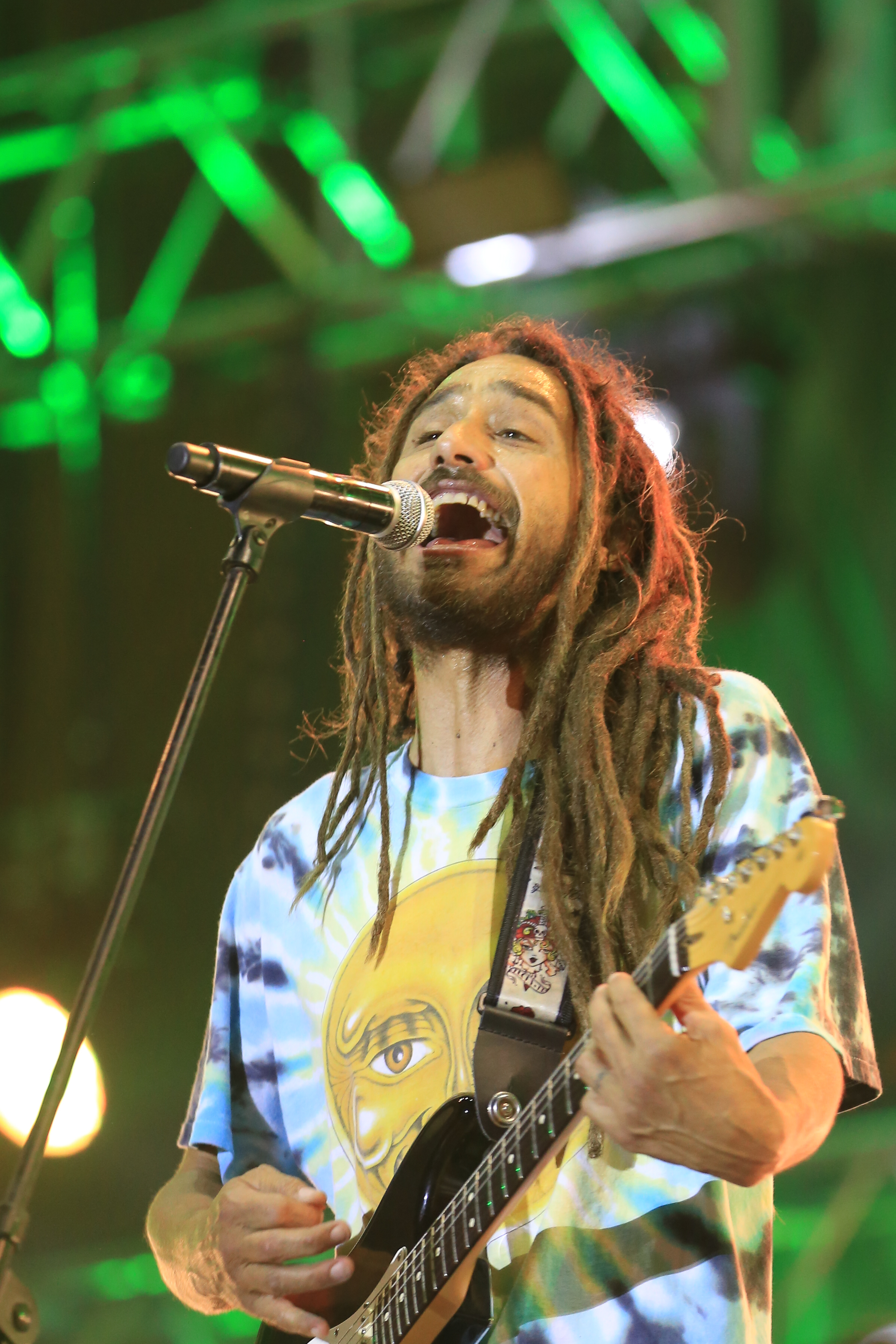
Joaquin "Quino" McWhinney (2018)

== Awards and nominations ==
Year	Awards	Work	Category	Result
1994	MTV Europe Music Awards	"Baby I Love Your Way"	Best Cover	Won
1995	Ivor Novello Awards	"Baby I Love Your Way"	Most Performed Work	Nominated

== Discography ==
=== Studio albums ===
Title	Details	Peak chart positions							
Title	Details	US	AUS	AUT	GER	NED	NZ	SWE	SWI
California Reggae (as Shiloh)	Release date: 1988; Label: Quality; Formats: LP	—	—	—	—	—	—	—	—
Wake Up	Release date: October 13, 1992; Label: Quality; Formats: CD	—	—	—	—	—	—	—	—
Unity	Release date: July 19, 1994; Label: Giant; Formats: CD	174	97	15	52	52	29	37	10
Resistance	Release date: January 1, 1996; Label: Giant; Formats: CD	—	—	—	—	—	—	—	—
Free Up	Release date: August 26, 1997; Label: Giant; Formats: CD	—	—	—	—	—	—	—	—
Things to Come	Release date: August 4, 1999; Label: Pony Canyon; Formats: CD	—	—	—	—	—	—	—	—
Dance Party	Release date: 2000; Label: Momentum; Formats: CD, cassette	—	—	—	—	—	—	—	—
One Love	Release date: April 17, 2001; Label: Pony Canyon; Formats: CD	—	—	—	—	—	—	—	—
Cool Breeze	Release date: July 4, 2001; Label: Pony Canyon; Formats: CD	—	—	—	—	—	—	—	—
New Day	Release date: June 19, 2002; Label: Pony Canyon; Formats: CD	—	—	—	—	—	—	—	—
Perfect Summer	Release date: May 27, 2016; Label: VPAL; Formats: CD	—	—	—	—	—	—	—	—
"—" denotes releases that did not chart

=== Compilations ===
- The Best of Big Mountain (1998), Giant
- Reggae Remakes (2003), Pony Canyon
- Big Mountain's Greatest Moments 1999–2004 (2004), Pony Canyon
- Versions Undercover (2008), Rebel Ink Records

=== Singles ===
Year	Title	Peak chart positions										Certifications (sales thresholds)	Album
Year	Title	US	AUS	AUT	CAN	GER	NED	NZ	SWE	SWI	UK	Certifications (sales thresholds)	Album
1992	"Touch My Light"	51	—	—	—	—	—	—	—	—	—		Wake Up
1993	"Reggae Inna Summertime"	—	179	—	—	—	—	—	—	—	—		Wake Up
1994	"Baby, I Love Your Way"	6	4	4	2	9	3	12	1	2	2	AUS: Platinum; UK: Silver; US: Gold	Unity
1994	"I Would Find a Way"	—	—	—	—	62	—	—	—	—	—		Unity
1994	"Sweet Sensual Love"	80	—	—	87	—	—	23	—	—	51		Unity
1995	"Get Together"	44	127	—	16	71	—	49	—	—	—		Resistance
1995	"Where Do the Children Play"	—	—	—	—	—	—	—	—	—	—		Resistance
1995	"Caribbean Blue"	—	—	—	—	—	—	—	—	—	94		Resistance
1997	"All Kinds of People"	—	—	—	—	75	—	—	—	—	—		Free Up
1997	"Let's Stay Together"	—	—	—	—	—	—	—	—	—	—		Free Up
2011	"Leap of Faith"	—	—	—	—	—	—	—	—	—	—		Non-album singles
2013	"Blue Skies"	—	—	—	—	—	—	—	—	—	—		Non-album singles
2016	"Here Comes the Sun" (The Beatles cover)	—	—	—	—	—	—	—	—	—	—		Perfect Summer
"—" denotes releases that did not chart
