= Do You Sleep? =

1995 single by Lisa Loeb

Single by Lisa Loeb and Nine Stories

from the album Tails
- B-side: "When All the Stars Were Falling"; "Birds"
- Released: September 4, 1995
- Length: 3:50
- Label: Geffen
- Songwriter: Lisa Loeb
- Producers: Lisa Loeb; Juan Patiño

Lisa Loeb singles chronology
"Taffy" (1995)	"Do You Sleep?" (1995)	"I Do" (1997)

"Do You Sleep?" is a song by American band Lisa Loeb and Nine Stories. It was released on September 4, 1995 by Geffen Records, as the third single from their debut and only album, Tails (1995). It reached numbers 14 and 18 on the US Cash Box Top 100 and Billboard Hot 100 charts, and number eight on Canada's RPM 100 Hit Tracks chart, becoming the band's last top-20 hit in both countries, although Loeb would earn another top-20 single as a solo artist with "I Do" two years later. Outside North America, "Do You Sleep?" reached the top 50 in Australia, Iceland, and the United Kingdom. The music video accompanying this song was directed by British director Sophie Muller.

== Track listings ==
- US CD, 7-inch, and cassette single
1. "Do You Sleep?" – 3:50
2. "When All the Stars Were Falling" – 2:52
- UK CD single
1. "Do You Sleep?" (LP version)
2. "Birds"
3. "When All the Stars Were Falling" (LP version)
4. "Hurricane" ("Purple" acoustic cassette version)
- UK 7-inch picture disc and cassette single; Australian CD single
1. "Do You Sleep?" (LP version) – 3:57
2. "Birds" – 2:50
3. "When All the Stars Were Falling" (LP version) – 2:53
- Japanese CD single
1. "Do You Sleep?" (LP version)
2. "Birds"

== Charts ==
=== Weekly charts ===
Chart (1995)	Peak position
Australia (ARIA)	49
Canada Top Singles (RPM)	8
Canada Adult Contemporary (RPM)	8
Canada Rock/Alternative (RPM)	20
Europe Airplay (European Hit Radio)	19
Iceland (Íslenski Listinn Topp 40)	26
Netherlands (Single Top 100 Tipparade)	11
Quebec (ADISQ)	37
Scottish Singles Sales (Official Charts)	47
UK Singles (Official Charts)	45
US Billboard Hot 100	18
US Adult Contemporary (Billboard)	30
US Modern Rock Tracks (Billboard)	20
US Cash Box Top 100	14

=== Year-end charts ===
Chart (1995)	Position
Canada Top Singles (RPM)	63
Canada Adult Contemporary (RPM)	86

== Release history ==
Region	Date	Format(s)	Label(s)	Ref.
United Kingdom	September 4, 1995	7-inch vinyl; CD; cassette	Geffen	
United States	September 5, 1995	Contemporary hit radio	Geffen	
Japan	September 6, 1995	CD	Geffen	
Australia	September 11, 1995	CD	Geffen	
