= Talk box =

Effects unit that allows musicians to modify the sound of a musical instrument

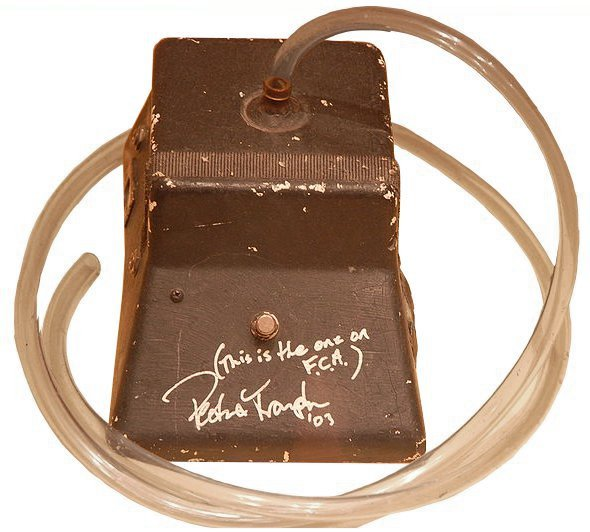
Peter Frampton's talk box

A talk box (also spelled talkbox and talk-box) is an effects unit that allows musicians to modify the sound of a musical instrument by shaping the frequency content of the sound and to apply speech sounds (in the same way as singing) onto the sounds of the instrument. Typically, a talk box directs sound from the instrument into the musician's mouth by means of a plastic tube adjacent to a vocal microphone. The musician controls the modification of the instrument's sound by changing the shape of the mouth, "vocalizing" the instrument's output into a microphone.

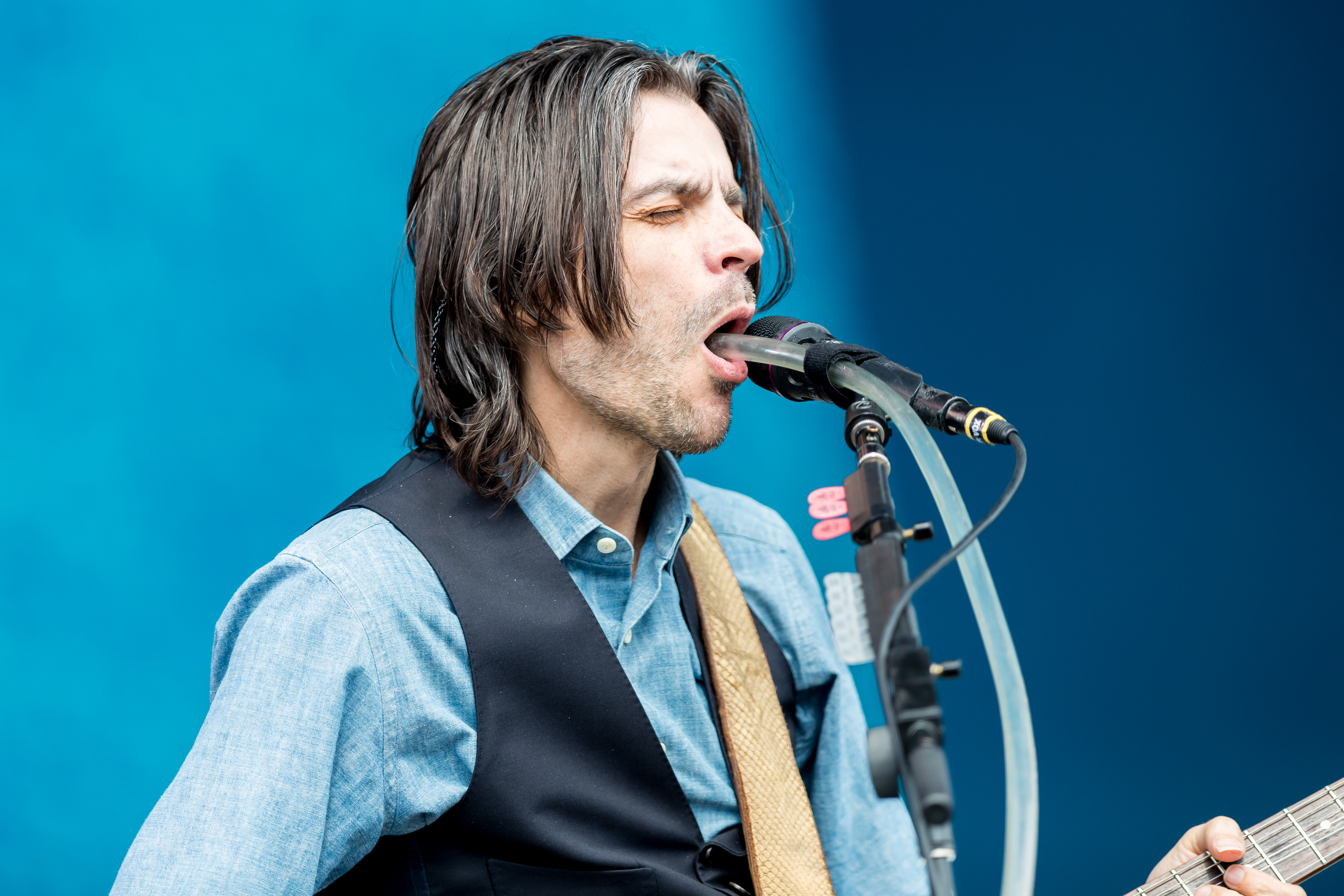
Weezer guitarist Brian Bell with a talk box, the tube being attached to the microphone (2022)

== Overview ==
A talk box is usually an effects pedal that sits on the floor and contains a speaker attached with an airtight connection to a plastic tube; however, it can come in other forms, including homemade, usually crude, versions, and higher quality custom-made versions. The speaker is generally in the form of a compression driver, the sound-generating part of a horn loudspeaker with the horn replaced by the tube connection.

The box has connectors for the connection to the speaker output of an instrument amplifier and a connection to a normal instrument speaker. A foot-operated switch on the box directs the sound either to the talk box speaker or to the normal speaker. The switch is usually a push-on/push-off type. The other end of the tube is taped to the side of a microphone, extending enough to direct the reproduced sound in or near the performer's mouth.

When activated, the sound from the amplifier is reproduced by the speaker in the talk box and directed through the tube into the performer's mouth. The shape of the mouth filters the sound, with the modified sound being picked up by the microphone. The shape of the mouth changes the harmonic content of the sound in the same way it affects the harmonic content generated by the vocal folds when speaking.

The performer can vary the shape of the mouth and position of the tongue, changing the sound of the instrument being reproduced by the talk box speaker. The performer can mouth words, with the resulting effect sounding as though the instrument is speaking. This "shaped" sound exits the performer's mouth, and when it enters a microphone, an instrument/voice hybrid is heard.

The sound can be that of any musical instrument, but the effect is most commonly associated with the guitar. The rich harmonics of an electric guitar are shaped by the mouth, producing a sound very similar to voice, effectively allowing the guitar to appear to "speak".

The effect produced by talk boxes and vocoders are often conflated by listeners. However, they have radically different mechanisms for achieving the effect. Talk boxes send the carrier signal into the singer's mouth, where it is then modulated by the singer themselves. On the other hand, vocoders process both the carrier and the modulator signal integrally, producing the output as a separate electric signal. They are also more common in different genres: a talk box is often found in rock music due to its typical pairing with a guitar, whereas vocoders are almost always paired with synthesizers, and as such, are ubiquitous in electronic music.

== History ==
=== Singing guitar ===
In 1939, Alvino Rey, amateur radio operator W6UK, used a carbon throat microphone wired in such a way as to modulate his electric steel guitar sound. The mic, originally developed for military pilot communications, was placed on the throat of Rey's wife Luise King (one of The King Sisters), who stood behind a curtain and mouthed the words, along with the guitar lines. The novel-sounding combination was called "Singing Guitar"; it was employed on stage and in the movie Jam Session (1944) as a "novelty" attraction, but was not developed further.

Rey also created a somewhat similar-sounding "talking" effect by manipulating the tone controls of his Fender electric guitar, but the vocal effect was less pronounced.

=== Sonovox ===
Another early voice effect using the same principle of the throat as a filter was the Sonovox, invented by Gilbert Wright in 1939. Instead of a throat microphone modulating a guitar signal, it used small transducers attached to the performer's throat to produce sounds that the mouth shapes. The Sonovox was marketed and promoted by the Wright-Sonovox company, an affiliate of the Free & Peters advertising agency.

The Sonovox was used in many radio station IDs and jingles produced by JAM Creative Productions and the PAMS advertising agency of Dallas, Texas. Lucille Ball made one of her earliest film appearances during the 1930s in a Pathé Newsreel demonstrating the Sonovox.

The first use in music was a score by Ernst Toch in the Paramount film The Ghost Breakers, in June 1940. The Sonovox was used, with an opening credit, for the spirit voices in the 1940 comedy film You'll Find Out. It was used to produce the "voice" of the anthropomorphic train Casey Jr. in the 1941 animated films The Reluctant Dragon and, most famously, Dumbo, and was also used for the "talking piano" in a children's record issued on Capitol Records entitled Sparky's Magic Piano.

=== Talking steel guitar ===
Pete Drake, a Nashville-based player of the pedal steel guitar, used a talk box on his 1964 album Forever, in what came to be called his "talking steel guitar". The following year Gallant released three albums with the box, Pete Drake & His Talking Guitar, Talking Steel and Singing Strings, and Talking Steel Guitar. Drake's device consisted of an 8-inch paper cone speaker driver attached to a funnel from which a clear tube brought the sound to the performer's mouth. It was only loud enough to be useful in the recording studio.

Another prominent use of the talking steel guitar appears in The Ventures' Christmas Album, released in 1965. In the song "Silver Bells", Red Rhodes spoke through a talk box, distorting the phrase silver bells.

=== Kustom Electronics talk box ("The Bag") ===
The Kustom Electronics device "The Bag" was the first mass market talk box and was housed in a decorative bag slung over the shoulder like a wine bottle. It used a 30-watt driver and was released to the mass music market in early 1969, two years before Bob Heil's talk box became widely available. The Bag is claimed to have been designed by Doug Forbes, who states that exactly the same concept (speaker attached to a plastic tube and inserted into the mouth) had previously been patented as an artificial larynx.

Stevie Wonder gave the talk box its first national television prominence, performing a medley of The Carpenters' "(They Long To Be) Close To You" and The Jackson 5's "Never Can Say Goodbye", both via a Kustom Bag, live on the David Frost show in 1972.

Jeff Beck used a Kustom Bag talk box in May 1973 on "Superstition" at a Santa Monica concert. He also used it on "She's a Woman" from his 1975 release Blow by Blow, and was seen using it for the song on BBC television program Five Faces of the Guitar in 1974 in which he also explains its use to the host of the show.

David Gilmour of Pink Floyd employed the effect during the lengthy guitar solo sections of "Raving and Drooling" and "You've Got to Be Crazy" on the 1974 tour, which would eventually become "Sheep" and "Dogs" on the Animals album.

=== Heil high-powered talk box ===
The first high-powered talk box was developed by Bob Heil.

The classic rock artist Peter Frampton made extensive use of the talk box in his music. In an interview for the 1999 DVD Live in Detroit, Frampton says he first heard the talk box in 1970 while sitting in on sessions for George Harrison's All Things Must Pass. While he sat next to Pete Drake in the album sessions at Abbey Road Studios, he heard Drake using it with a pedal steel guitar. Frampton said in the same interview that the sound it produced reminded him of an audio effect he loved listening to on Radio Luxembourg in the later 1960s. Frampton acquired one as a Christmas present from Bob Heil in 1974. It was a hand-built talk box in a fiberglass box using a 100-watt high-powered driver. This was the Heil talk box used for the Frampton Comes Alive tour and album. He then promptly locked himself away in a practice space for two weeks, and came out with some mastery of it. The success of the albums Frampton and Frampton Comes Alive!, and particularly the hit singles "Do You Feel Like We Do" and "Show Me the Way", made Frampton's music somewhat synonymous with the talk box.

Frampton also now sells his own line of custom-designed "Framptone" products, including a talk box.

In 1976, Steely Dan guitarist Walter Becker recorded the talk box effect atop an already-recorded Dean Parks solo in "Haitian Divorce", on the album The Royal Scam. Also from 1977, Johnnie "Guitar" Watson used a talk box. The 1974 album 461 Ocean Boulevard features Eric Clapton using a talk box during his outgoing solo on the song "Mainline Florida".

=== Electro Harmonix "Golden Throat" ===
Roger Troutman (November 29, 1951 – April 25, 1999) was the lead singer of the band Zapp who helped spearhead the Funk movement and heavily influenced West Coast hip hop due to the scene’s heavy sampling of his music over the years. Troutman was well known for his use of the talkbox, a device that is connected to an instrument (frequently a keyboard) to create different vocal effects. Roger was inspired by Peter Frampton's use of the instrument.

Roger used a custom-made talkbox—the Electro Harmonix “Golden Throat,” as well as a Yamaha DX100 FM synthesizer. As both lead singer of Zapp and in his subsequent solo releases, he scored a bevy of funk and R&B hits throughout the 1980s.

=== ElectroSpit ===
Producer Bosko, who played talk box on Big Boi's 2010 album Sir Lucious Left Foot: The Son of Chico Dusty, conceived an alternative to the cumbersome and unsanitary talk box in mid-2014, imagining a neck-worn electronic system that would be easier to use. Bosko showed the ElectroSpit prototype in 2016, and launched a Kickstarter campaign in June 2018. The device sends sound into the mouth by way of electromagnetic transducers placed against the throat, allowing the user to shape the sounds of a synthesizer, guitar or any other electronic source. Bosko released the ElectroSpit product in 2019, showing it at the NAMM Show. Early users of the ElectroSpit include P-Thugg of Chromeo, Terrace Martin who works with Kendrick Lamar, and Teddy Riley.

== Non-musical uses ==
A talk box connected to an iPad running an effects program was used to create the voice of the character BB-8 in Star Wars: The Force Awakens (2015).

== See also ==
- Auto-Tune
- Vocoder
- Wah-wah pedal
