= Fencewalk: The Anthology =

Compilation album by Mandrill
- Released: February 4, 1997
- Recorded: 1970–1979
- Genre: R&B; soul; funk; jazz fusion
- Length: 2:35:22
- Label: Polydor Records
- Producer: Henry Weinger; Mandrill

Mandrill chronology
Rebirth (1992)	Fencewalk: The Anthology (1997)	The Ultimate Collection (2000)

Fencewalk: The Anthology is a compilation album by the Panamanian–American funk/jazz/rock band Mandrill, released by Polydor Records on February 4, 1997. It was released as part of Polydor's The Soul Essentials series.

The cover is similar to that of Mandrill's 1973 album Composite Truth.

== Critical reception ==
Professional ratings
Review scores
Source	Rating
AllMusic	4.5/5 stars

Ned Raggett of AllMusic said that the collection was a "fine overview of Mandrill's work throughout the '70s" and added that "this is required listening for anyone exploring the roots of electric funk", calling it "music aiming to move minds and bodies in equal measure."

Tony Green of JazzTimes praised the compilation, saying "[a] word to anyone who passes on the two-disc Fencewalk: The Anthology: you’re missing out." He added that "the group’s often eye-opening stylistic range remains one of the most overlooked high points of funk’s golden era."

== Track listing ==
- All tracks written and arranged by Mandrill

=== Disc one ===
1. "Mandrill" – 4:19
2. "Rollin' On" – 7:38
3. "Symphonic Revolution" – 5:16
4. "Peace and Love (Amani Na Mapenzi)" – 8:09
5. "Lord of the Golden Baboon" – 3:34
6. "Ape Is High" – 5:34
7. "Cohelo" – 1:44
8. "Git It All" – 4:30
9. "Children of the Sun" – 4:56
10. "I Refuse to Smile" – 4:05
11. "Kofijahm" – 3:38
12. "Hang Loose" – 4:45
13. "Fencewalk" – 5:28
14. "Hágalo" – 2:44
15. "Don't Mess with People" – 4:52
16. "Moroccan Nights" – 6:39
- Tracks 1 to 4 from Mandrill (1971)
- Tracks 5 to 11 from Mandrill Is (1972)
- Tracks 12 to 16 from Composite Truth (1973)

=== Disc two ===
1. "Mango Meat" – 4:42
2. "Fat City Strut" – 3:16
3. "Love Song" – 5:39
4. "Positive Thing" – 3:14
5. "Road to Love" – 5:15
6. "Armadillo" – 1:48
7. "Khidja" – 4:55
8. "House of Wood" – 7:59
9. "Folks on a Hill" – 6:23
10. "Gilly Hines" – 6:35
11. "Can You Get It (Suzie Caesar)" – 7:05
12. "Funky Monkey" – 6:30
13. "Love One Another" – 3:59
14. "Too Late" – 3:38
15. "Echoes in My Mind" – 6:09
- Tracks 1 to 3 from Just Outside of Town (1973)
- Tracks 4 to 9 from Mandrilland (1974)
- Tracks 10 to 13 from We Are One (1977)
- Track 14 from New Worlds (1978)
- Track 15 from the Warriors soundtrack (1979)

== Personnel ==
- Alan Rubin – Trumpet
- Arnold McCuller – Background vocals
- Baker Bigsby – Engineer
- Bill Evans – Engineer
- Bundie Cenac – Bass, composer, percussion, vocals
- Carlos Wilson – Composer, conductor, flute, guitar, percussion, producer, alto saxophone, string arrangements, timbales, trombone, vocals
- Charles Padro – Composer, drums, percussion, vocals
- Chris Parker – Drums
- Claude Cave II – Composer, conductor, organ, percussion, piano, producer, string arrangements, synthesizer, vibraphone, vocals
- Cliff Morris – Guitar
- Corkey Stasiak – Engineer
- David Conley – Saxophone
- David Palmer – Engineer
- David Tofani – Alto saxophone
- Dennis Ferrante – Engineer
- Doug Cameron – Violin
- Douglas Rodrigues – Composer, guitar, percussion, vocals
- Elliott Randall – Guitar
- Erroll "Crusher" Bennett – Percussion
- Fudgie Kae – Bass, composer, acoustic guitar, percussion, piano, vocals
- Greg Mathieson – Piano
- Harry Maslin – Engineer
- Joe Ferla – Engineer
- John Bradley – Engineer
- Kenny Mason – Flugelhorn, trumpet
- Kenny Vance – Background vocals
- Kim King – Engineer
- Larry Elliott – Engineer
- Lee Peterzell – Engineer
- Lou Wilson – Composer, congas, flugelhorn, percussion, vocals
- Luther Vandross – Background vocals
- Neftali Santiago – Composer, guitar, percussion, vocals
- Neil Jason – Bass
- Omar Mesa – composer, guitar, percussion, vocals
- Pablo Guzmán – Liner notes
- Paul Griffin – Arranger, clarinet, background vocals
- Paul Trejo – Guitar
- Ric Wilson – Composer, percussion, tenor saxophone, vocals
- Rick Rowe – Engineer
- Rob Mounsey – Arranger, electric piano
- Susan Collins – Background vocals
- Tom "Bones" Malone – Trombone
- Wilfred Wilson – Composer
