= Doug Rauch =

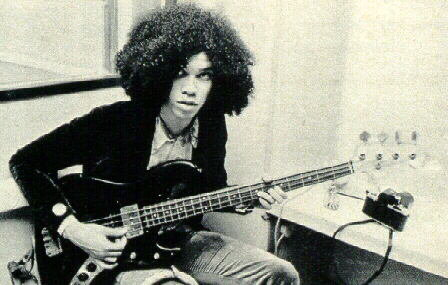
- Rauch in the 1970s

Background information
- Born: Douglass Haywood Rauch; September 14, 1950; New York City, US
- Died: April 23, 1979 (aged 28) San Francisco, California
- Genre: Jazz fusion
- Occupation: Musician
- Instrument: Bass guitar
- Years active: 1969–1976

Douglass Haywood Rauch (September 14, 1950 – April 23, 1979) was an American bassist.

== Early life ==
Douglass Haywood Rauch was born in New York City. Rauch was the son of opera singer Nadyne Brewer and Jerome S. Rauch.

== Career ==
In 1969, Rauch played on Bunky and Jake's album L.A.M.F.

That year, Rauch performed at The Bitter End in New York City as a member of the Buzzy Linhart Quartet, with Buzzy Linhart, guitarist Doug Rodrigues and drummer John Siomos. The group was later called Music and recorded its self-titled album in 1970; Music was released by Eleuthera Records in 1971.

Rauch played bass with The Voices of East Harlem. Carlos Santana first heard Rauch when the Voices of East Harlem and Santana appeared at Tanglewood in August 1970.

In March 1971, Rauch and Rodrigues traveled with the Voices of East Harlem to Accra, Ghana, where the group performed at the Soul to Soul concert at Black Star Square. The concert was filmed for the documentary Soul to Soul. In an interview with Jake Feinberg, Rodrigues recounted playing with Rauch in the Voices of East Harlem and traveling to Africa with the group.

In 1971, Rauch played on Carly Simon's self-titled debut album. He recorded with Papa John Creach the same year.

In 1971, Rauch recorded with Michael Carabello and Greg Errico on sessions released as the album Giants in 1978. The recordings included Carlos Santana, Neal Schon, Gregg Rolie, Herbie Hancock and guitarist Doug Rodrigues. McCarthy called "Attitude" a "raw, burning funk-out", citing Rauch's bass and Errico's drums.

Rauch moved to the San Francisco Bay Area, where he worked with The Loading Zone and keyboardist Tom Coster. In 1972, he played bass in Gábor Szabó's quintet, with guitarist Tom Bryant and drummer Kenneth "Spider" Rice.

Rauch joined Santana in early 1972. He began recording Caravanserai with the band in February, appearing on five of the album's ten tracks. He played bass on "Waves Within", "Look Up (To See What's Coming Down)", "Just in Time to See the Sun", "Song of the Wind" and "All the Love of the Universe", and guitar on "Waves Within" and "Look Up (To See What's Coming Down)". Rauch co-wrote "Waves Within" with Gregg Rolie and "Look Up (To See What's Coming Down)" with Rolie and Carlos Santana.

Rauch brought guitarist Doug Rodrigues from New York to San Francisco to play on the album. Rodrigues played guitar with Rauch and Santana on "Waves Within".

In April 1973, Philip Elwood of the San Francisco Examiner identified Rauch as Santana's bassist and described Rauch, Coster and the other members as reflecting the "good feelings" onstage. Donn Liston identified Rauch as Santana's bassist in a June 1973 article on the band's tour. Rauch played on Welcome (1973) and the live album Lotus (1974), and on Carlos Santana and John McLaughlin's Love Devotion Surrender (1973).

In 1973, Rauch recorded with Betty Davis and José "Chepito" Areas. He recorded with Bola Sete during this period.

In September 1974, Rauch joined David Bowie for part of the Diamond Dogs Tour. His September 5 performance at the Universal Amphitheatre in Los Angeles was released in 2017 as Cracked Actor (Live Los Angeles '74).

In 1975, Rauch played on Japanese guitarist Shigeru Suzuki's album Band Wagon. Rauch played bass on seven of its nine tracks.

In 1975, Rauch played bass on Lenny White's Venusian Summer. Rauch and guitarist Doug Rodrigues wrote "Chicken-Fried Steak", and with White wrote "Away Go Troubles Down the Drain". The Ann Arbor News rated the album's performance "Dynamic" and named Rauch among the musicians on the recording.

In 1976, Rauch played with Billy Cobham in a band with keyboardist George Duke and guitarist John Scofield. The group recorded Cobham's album Life & Times. Billboard described the quartet's music as "hard-driving jazz-rock".

== Death ==
In Rauch's final years, he suffered from depression and numerous addictions. Rauch died of a drug overdose in San Francisco, California, on April 23, 1979, at the age of 28.

== Discography ==
- 1969: Bunky & Jake: L.A.M.F.
- 1970: Music: Music (later re-released as Buzzy Linhart is Music)
- 1971: Carly Simon: Carly Simon
- 1971: Papa John Creach: Papa John Creach
- 1971: Giants: Giants (recorded 1971, released 1978)
- 1972: Santana: Caravanserai
- 1973: Santana: Welcome
- 1973: Betty Davis: Betty Davis
- 1973: Bola Sete: Goin' to Rio
- 1973: John McLaughlin & Carlos Santana: Love Devotion Surrender
- 1974: Santana: Lotus
- 1974: Jose Chepito Areas: Jose Chepito Areas
- 1974: David Bowie: Cracked Actor (recorded 1974, released 2017)
- 1975: Shigeru Suzuki: Band Wagon
- 1975: Cobham/Duke Band: Live at the Electric Ballroom (Dallas NYE 1975 live recording)
- 1976: Lenny White: Venusian Summer
- 1976: Billy Cobham: Life & Times
- 1976: Ike White: Changin' Times (recorded in Tehachapi State Prison)
