= Doug Rodrigues =

American guitarist, songwriter and motocross racer

- Born: Douglas Rodrigues
- Occupations: Musician; songwriter; motocross racer
- Years active: 1960s–present
- Musical career
- Genres: Rock; funk; jazz fusion
- Instrument: Guitar
- Formerly of: Mandrill; Music

Doug Rodrigues (Note: Rodrigues' surname has sometimes been misspelled as "Rodriguez".) (also credited as Douglas Rodrigues) is an American guitarist and songwriter, who also raced motocross. He finished tenth in the 1970 Trans-AMA event at Delta, Ohio.

In the 1960s, Rodrigues played with Mitch Ryder and Buzzy Linhart and recorded on Music from Free Creek with Moogy Klingman, Eric Clapton, Jeff Beck, Keith Emerson, Todd Rundgren and Linda Ronstadt. He was a member of Music with Linhart, Doug Rauch and John Siomos, recording the group's self-titled album, Music. Rodrigues and Rauch played together with The Voices of East Harlem and recorded with Lenny White, Santana and Betty Davis. He joined Mandrill as lead guitarist in 1974, and then relocated to Southern California to play and record with Terry Reid.

== Early life and education ==
Doug Rodrigues is from Little Neck, New York, where he grew up with his older brother, Don, and younger brother, Randy. He attended Great Neck South High School. Moogy Klingman, from nearby Great Neck, became a mentor to Rodrigues.Doug's first group was in High School, Adam And The Edens with Adam on guitar and lead vocals, Doug's on lead guitar, Doug's older brother Don on bass and a drummer.

== Music career ==
=== Mitch Ryder ===
After separating from the Detroit Wheels in late 1966, Ryder formed a 10-piece backing band with a horn section. Klingman introduced Rodrigues to Mitch Ryder. In 1967, Rodrigues joined Ryder's post-Detroit Wheels touring group, the Mitch Ryder Show, playing guitar in the "Sock It to Me Baby" band alongside Howie Bloom on bass, John Siomos on drums, Frank Invernizzi on keyboards, J. D. Crane on trombone, Bob Shipley and Jim Loomis on tenor saxophones, and Andy Dio on trumpet. By 1969, Rodrigues and John Siomos were playing with Mitch Ryder and the Spirit Feel.

=== Music from Free Creek ===
Rodrigues recorded on Music from Free Creek with Moogy Klingman, Eric Clapton, Jeff Beck, Keith Emerson, Todd Rundgren and Linda Ronstadt, playing guitar on "Lay Lady Lay". The sessions were recorded at the Record Plant in New York in 1969 and released on the double album Music from Free Creek in 1973.

=== Buzzy Linhart and Music ===
Rodrigues played with Buzzy Linhart in the Seventh Sons as a teenager. By 1969, Linhart, Rodrigues, Doug Rauch and John Siomos were performing as the Buzzy Linhart Quartet. The group then named their band Music and recorded the self-titled album Music at Electric Lady Studios in 1970. The album, produced by Music and Eddie Kramer, was released by Eleuthera Records in 1971. Rodrigues and Linhart's playing on Tim Hardin's "You Got a Reputation" was described as "weirdly irresistible pop territory".

=== The Voices of East Harlem and Soul to Soul ===
Rodrigues played guitar with The Voices of East Harlem, with Doug Rauch on bass and Jimmy Smith on keyboards. In All Roads Lead to Great Neck, Josh Alan Friedman described Rodrigues's rhythmic solos with the Voices as "sublime".

Rodrigues went to Accra, Ghana, with the Voices of East Harlem for the Soul to Soul concert on March 6, 1971. In his interview with Jake Feinberg, Rodrigues recalled that the flight started in California, where Santana boarded, and stopped in New York, where the Voices of East Harlem joined the flight to Ghana. The concert, held at Black Star Square, was filmed for the documentary Soul to Soul. Rauch is seen on bass with the Voices at 28:28 in the film; Rodrigues and Jimmy Smith are seen at 29:14. The Voices' performance of "Run, Shaker Life" appears in the film. The film was restored with support from the Grammy Foundation and released on DVD in 2004. For a new restoration, the original film elements were transferred in 2K and the original edit reconstructed from the new transfers. The film was released on Blu-ray for the first time in 2026. The 2026 expanded soundtrack, Soul to Soul: Music from the Original Soundtrack, includes the Voices of East Harlem's performances of "Run, Shaker Life" and "Choose Your Seat and Sit Down/Walk All Over God's Heaven", recorded live in Ghana on March 6, 1971.

=== Santana and Betty Davis ===
Doug Rauch brought Rodrigues from New York to San Francisco to play on Santana's Caravanserai (1972). Rodrigues played guitar on "Waves Within", with Carlos Santana on lead guitar and Rauch on bass and guitar.

Rodrigues and Rauch recorded on Betty Davis's self-titled debut album, Betty Davis, released by Just Sunshine Records in 1973. Produced by Greg Errico, the album also featured Larry Graham on bass, Neal Schon on guitar, Hershall Kennedy on organ, Merl Saunders on keyboards, and the Pointer Sisters on backing vocals.

=== Mandrill ===
Rodrigues joined Mandrill in 1974, replacing Omar Mesa as lead guitarist. He and drummer Neftali Santiago were Mandrill's two new members on the group's double album Mandrilland. Rodrigues wrote "After The Race", which appeared on this album. In Best Music Writing 2008, edited by Nelson George and Daphne Carr, Matt Rogers described Rodrigues as "Betty Davis/Santana/Voices of East Harlem vet" who "took his chair" for Mandrilland.

=== Lenny White ===
Rodrigues played rhythm and lead guitar on Lenny White's 1975 album Venusian Summer. Rodrigues and Doug Rauch wrote "Chicken-Fried Steak". Rodrigues played rhythm and lead guitar on the track. Rodrigues, Rauch and White wrote and arranged "Away Go Troubles (Down the Drain)", with Rodrigues playing rhythm and lead guitar and contributing vocals. Rodrigues also played guitar on "Mating Drive".

=== Bill Quateman ===
Rodrigues joined Bill Quateman's band in the mid-1970s. He came in on guitar following the departure of Caleb Quaye and Elliott Randall. The band, which included Andy Potter, Ira G. Kart and Rollow Radford, recorded "Don't You Wonder" and "Night After Night" at Paragon Studio in Chicago.

=== Terry Reid ===
Rodrigues moved to Southern California to play and record with Terry Reid, who was living in Oxnard. After Seed of Memory, Reid toured with Rodrigues on guitar and Lee Miles on bass.

In 1978, Reid went into Brother's Studios in Santa Monica, California, with Rodrigues on lead guitar, Miles on bass and John Siomos on drums to record Rogue Waves with producer Chris Kimsey. Deléglise described Reid, Rodrigues, Miles and Siomos as the core of the recording, with a sound that returned to the power of Reid's early records. The quieter passages on the album feature some of Reid and Rodrigues's best guitar playing. Rodrigues appears in the trailer for Superlungs: A Terry Reid Documentary, immediately after Robert Plant.

== Motocross ==
Rodrigues raced motocross. In the 1970 Trans-AMA motocross series, he finished tenth at the Delta, Ohio event on October 25, riding a ČZ.

Rodrigues bought a van and dirt bikes from the father of drummer Rick Marotta, who owned an automobile dealership. Marotta was among the New York session musicians associated with the Manhattan Dirt Riders, a motorcycle group whose name was used on James Taylor's 1974 summer tour.

== Discography ==
=== Selected albums ===
- Music – Music (1971) – artist band member, guitar
- The Time To Live Is Now - Buzzy Linhart (1971) – co-writer of "Good Face"
- Caravanserai – Santana (1972) – guitar on "Waves Within"
- Music from Free Creek – Free Creek (1973; recorded 1969) – guitar on "Lay Lady Lay"
- Betty Davis – Betty Davis (1973) – guitar
- Mandrilland – Mandrill (1974) – lead guitar
- Venusian Summer – Lenny White (1975) – rhythm and lead guitar, vocals; co-writer of "Chicken-Fried Steak" and "Away Go Troubles (Down the Drain)"
- Rogue Waves – Terry Reid (1978) – lead guitar
- Studio - Buzzy Linhart (2006) – co-writer "Love Is A Symphony"
