= Solid (disambiguation) =

Solid is one of the four fundamental states of matter.

Solid may also refer to:

== Plumbing ==
Solids refers to solid human waste in plumbing, whereas water and urine are referred to as liquids. A plumbing tool known as a snake helps remove solids from a blocked sewer pipe.

== Biology ==
- ABI Solid Sequencing, a DNA sequencing system
- Signs Of LIfe Detector (SOLID), an astrobiology instrument for in situ analyses

== Computing ==
- SOLID, a set of object-oriented design principles
- SolidJS, a Javascript framework supporting reactive programming
- Solid (KDE), a device framework of KDE
- Solid project, a set of linked data standards
- solidDB, a database

== Arts, entertainment, and media ==
=== Music ===
- Solid (Ashford & Simpson album) (1984)
  - "Solid" (Ashford & Simpson song), its title track
- Solid (Grant Green album) (1964 [1979])
- Solid (Groundhogs album) (1974)
- Solid (Michael Henderson album) (1976)
- Solid (Mandrill album) (1975)
- Solid (Woody Shaw album) (1986)
- Solid (U.D.O. album) (1997)
- Solid!, a 1998 album by Eric Alexander
- "Solid" (Young Thug and Gunna song), 2021
- "Solid", a 2022 by MUNA from their self-titled album
- The Solid Senders, a rock band formed in 1978 by Wilko Johnson

=== Other uses in arts, entertainment, and media ===
- Solid (billiard ball), the wholly colored balls 1-7
- Solid, a very strong suit in contract bridge
- Solid Snake, a character in the Metal Gear games series

== Other uses ==
- Solid figure, a three-dimensional figure
- Solid seat, one that is unlikely to change hands, in the nomenclature of political forecasting

== See also ==
- Solid state (disambiguation)
