= Mandrill (disambiguation) =

The mandrill is the world's largest species of monkey.

Mandrill may also refer to:

- Mandrill (band), an American funk band from Brooklyn, New York, formed in 1968
  - Mandrill (album), the band's self-titled debut album
- Mandrill (comics), a fictional Marvel Comics character who is a mutant supervillain
- Mandrill Studios, a recording studio in Parnell, a suburb of Auckland, New Zealand
- A miner's smallish pickaxe for use in confined spaces
- A character in Rhythm Heaven Fever

== See also ==
- Mandrel, a device
- MANDRIL, software
