= Giants (Giants album) =

Studio album by Giants
- Released: 1978
- Recorded: 1971–1972
- Genres: Latin rock, funk, jazz rock
- Labels: L.A. International, MCA
- Producer: Greg Errico

Giants is an album produced by Greg Errico, with musicians including Michael Carabello, Carlos Santana, Neal Schon, Herbie Hancock, Gregg Rolie, Doug Rauch and Doug Rodrigues. The album developed from recordings made in 1971–72 that were released as Giants in 1978. The album was released in the United States on MCA Records in 1979.

== Background and recording ==
The recordings originated with Attitude, a group formed around former Santana percussionist Michael Carabello and former Sly and the Family Stone drummer Greg Errico. Carabello's Attitude sessions were recorded in 1971–72. In 1978, Errico arranged for the recordings to be released under the title Giants through L.A. International, the label associated with War, and completed the album's vocal tracks.

The sessions brought together musicians including Errico, Carabello, Doug Rauch, Doug Rodrigues, Carlos Santana, Neal Schon, Gregg Rolie, José "Chepito" Areas, Victor Pantoja, Rico Reyes, Herbie Hancock, Lee Oskar, Wendy Haas, Coke Escovedo and Linda Tillery.

McCarthy called "Attitude" a "raw, burning funk-out", highlighting Rauch's bass and Errico's drums. He described the exchange between Santana and Schon on "In Your Heart" as "a great example of their telepathic interplay". McCarthy also praised the percussion-driven "Kilimanjaro", featuring Carabello, Pantoja, Reyes, Areas and Errico, with Oskar on harmonica.

== Release ==
Giants was released in 1978 through L.A. International. The album was subsequently released by MCA Records in the United States in 1979.

== Reception ==
Wayne Robins of Newsday described Giants as a reunion of musicians associated with Santana. He praised "They Change It" for the musicians' rhythmic playing and called the African percussion and synthesizer flutes on "Kilimanjaro" "fascinating".

Cash Box called the album a "summit meeting" of jazz and rock musicians and described its sound as Latin funk with a strong jazz influence.

Dan Herbeck of The Buffalo News gave the album a mixed review. He praised Hancock's piano playing and Santana's guitar work and described the album as having "a definite Latin flavor", with African influences on "Kilimanjaro" and "Pancho Villa" and a jazz influence on "They Change It".

== Track listing ==
=== Side one ===
1. "Attitude" – 3:25
2. "They Change It" – 3:29
3. "Kilimanjaro: The Village" – 4:30
4. "Kilimanjaro: The Summit" – 4:38

=== Side two ===
1. "Pancho Villa" – 5:11
2. "Fried Neckbones and Home Fries" – 6:32
3. "In Your Heart" – 5:40

== Personnel ==
Personnel adapted from the album credits.

- Greg Errico – drums, synthesizer; producer
- Michael Carabello – organ, congas
- Doug Rauch – bass
- Doug Rodrigues – guitar
- Wendy Haas – piano, vocals
- Carlos Santana – guitar
- Neal Schon – guitar
- Gregg Rolie – organ
- Herbie Hancock – piano
- Lee Oskar – harmonica
- José "Chepito" Areas – percussion
- Rico Reyes – percussion
- Victor Pantoja – congas
- Robert Vega – bass
- Mike Garcia – vibraphone
- Coke Escovedo – vocals
- Linda Tillery – vocals
- Bianca Thornton-Oden – vocals
- Freddie Pool – vocals
- Gene Washington – vocals
- Jody Moreing – vocals
