= Music from Free Creek =

1973 studio album by Free Creek

Studio album by Free Creek
- Released: 1973
- Recorded: 1969
- Studio: Record Plant
- Genre: Rock
- Label: Charisma
- Producers: Earle Doud; Tom Flye

Music from Free Creek is an album from a series of 1969 "super session" recordings by Free Creek, a group composed of a number of internationally renowned musical artists of the time, including Jeff Beck, Eric Clapton, Keith Emerson, Buzz Feiten, Mitch Mitchell and Linda Ronstadt. Joe Viglione from AllMusic has stated that "Music from Free Creek is a super session album, where the musicians are playing for the fun of it, and that comes across. The material doesn't get bogged down in 'names'; it just flows."

== History ==
The recordings, made in 1969, were released in 1973 in England as CADS 101 by Charisma Records and in the U.S. by Buddah Records, as a two-record set. The material was re-released by Charisma in 1976, as Summit Meeting. It was released on CD by Lake Eerie Records in 2002, and re-released by the same company in 2006.

== Track Listing and Personnel ==
=== The Eric Clapton ("King Cool") Session ===
1. No One Knows (lyrics by Tom Cosgrove and Stu Woods, music by Moogy Klingman)

- Guitar - Eric Clapton (as "King Cool")
- Lead Vocal - Eric Mercury
- Organ - Dr. John
- Piano - Moogy Klingman
- Bass - Stu Woods
- Drums - Richard Crooks
- The Free Creek Horns & The Free Creek Singers

2. Road Song (Klingman)

- Lead Guitar - Eric Clapton
- Piano - Dr. John
- Lead Vocals - Tom Cosgrove and Buzzy Linhart
- Organ - Moogy Klingman
- Rhythm Guitar - Delaney Bramlett
- Bass - Stu Woods
- Drums - Richard Crooks

3. Getting Back To Molly (Klingman)

- Guitars - Eric Clapton (1st solo), Dr. John (2nd solo)
- Lead Vocal - Earle Doude
- Harmonica - Moogy Klingman
- The Free Creek Singers

=== The Jeff Beck ("A.N. Other") Session ===
4. Cissy Strut (A. Neville, L. Nocentelli, G. Porter, Jr. and J. Modeliste)

- Guitars - Jeff Beck (1st solo, as "A.N. Other"), Todd Rundgren (2nd solo)
- Organ - Moogy Klingman
- Bass - Stu Woods
- Drums - Roy Markowitz
- The Free Creek Horns

5. Big City Woman (Klingman)

- Guitar - Jeff Beck
- Piano - Moogy Klingman
- Bass - Stu Woods
- Drums - Roy Markowitz
- Lead Vocal - Tommy Cosgrove

6. Cherrypicker (Jeff Beck, Moogy Klingman, Stu Woods and Roy Markowitz)

- Guitars - Jeff Beck, Todd Rundgren
- Organ - Moogy Klingman
- Bass - Stu Woods
- Drums - Roy Markowitz

7. Working in a Coalmine (Written by Allen Toussaint)

- Guitar - Jeff Beck
- Organ - Moogy Klingman, Bob Smith
- Bass - Stu Woods
- Drums - Roy Markowitz

=== The Keith Emerson Session ===
8. Freedom Jazz Dance (Eddie Harris)

- Hammond Organ - Keith Emerson
- Guitar - Buzzy Feiten
- Drums - Mitch Mitchell
- Piano - Moogy Klingman
- Bass - Chuck Rainey

9. On the Rebound (Floyd Cramer)

- Piano - Keith Emerson
- Guitar - Buzzy Feiten
- Bass - Chuck Rainey
- Drums - Mitch Mitchell
- Occasional Voice - Geri Miller

10. Mother Nature's Son (Lennon and McCartney)

- Piano - Keith Emerson
- Acoustic Guitar - Carol Hunter
- Oboe - Lou Delgato
- String Bass - Richard Davis

=== The Harvey Mandel Session ===
11. Sympathy for the Devil (Jagger/Richards)

- Lead Guitar - Harvey Mandel
- Rhythm Guitar - Jack Wilkens
- Organ - Moogy Klingman
- Piano - Jimmy Greenspoon
- Bass - Larry Taylor
- Violin - Larry Packer
- Drums - Fito de la Parra
- Congas - Billy Chesboro
- Bongos - Didymus

12. Earl's Shuffle (Harvey Mandel and Earle Doud)

- Lead Guitar - Harvey Mandel
- Pedal Steel Guitar - Red Rhodes
- Organ - Jimmy Greenspoon
- Bass - Larry Taylor
- Drums - Fito de la Parra

13. The Girl from Ipanema (Antonio Carlos Jobim and Norman Gimbel)

- Lead Guitar - Harvey Mandel
- Pedal Steel Guitar - Red Rhodes
- Bass - Larry Taylor
- Drums - Fito de la Parra
- Shakers - Didymus
- Wood Blocks - Earle Doud

=== Odds & Sods ===
14. Hey Jude (Lennon and McCartney)

- Lead Guitar - Buzzy Feiten
- Organ - Moogy Klingman
- Drums - Mitch Mitchell
- Bass - Richard Davis
- Rhythm Guitar - Elliot Randall
- The Free Creek Horns

15. Lay Lady Lay (Dylan)

- Flutes - Joe Farrell (solo), Chris Wood
- Piano - Moogy Klingman
- Guitar - Doug Rodrigues
- Bass - Stu Woods
- Drums - Roy Markowitz

16. Kilpatrick's Defeat (Moogy Klingman and Mike Gayle)

- Lead Vocal - Timmy Harrison
- Guitars - Carol Hunter and Buzzy Feiten
- Bass - Stu Woods

=== The Linda Ronstadt Session ===
17. Living Like a Fool (Maxwell and Crutchfield)

- Lead Vocal - Linda Ronstadt
- Guitar - Bernie Leadon
- Pedal Steel Guitar - Red Rhodes
- Piano - Jimmy Greenspoon
- Bass - John London
- Drums - John Ware

18. He Darked the Sun (Bernie Leadon and Gene Clark)

- Lead Vocal - Linda Ronstadt
- Guitar - Bernie Leadon
- Pedal Steel Guitar - Red Rhodes
- Piano - Jimmy Greenspoon
- Bass - John London
- Drums - John Ware
- Violin - Chris Darrow

The Free Creek Horns are:

- Lou Delgato
- Bobby Keller
- Meco Monardo
- Tom Malone
- Lew Soloff
- Alan Rubin
- Bill Chase

The Free Creek Singers are:

- Valerie Simpson
- Maeretha Stewart
- Hilda Harris

=== Other Credits and Particulars ===
Music from Free Creek was recorded and mixed in New York City at The Record Plant, June, July & August, 1969

Produced by Earle Doud and Tom Flye
Executive Producer and Musical Director: Moogy Klingman
Engineers: Tony Bongiovi and Jack Hunt
Additional mixes: Keith Emerson and Neil Slaven
Album cover painting by Ronchetti and Day
Album cover design: Hipgnosis

=== Track listing ===
The UK release of the double LP arranges the tracks in the following order.

The 2006 Lake Eerie single CD Free Creek LER 43014 has the same 18 tracks in the same order, with some minor variations in track titles and musician credits.

LP 1, side A (ADS1A, stated running time 17:52)

- "Cissy Strut" – Jeff Beck session
- "Freedom Jazz Dance" – Keith Emerson session
- "Sympathy for the Devil" – Harvey Mandel session
- "Mother Nature's Son" – Keith Emerson session
- "Road Song" – Eric Clapton session

LP 1, side B (ADS1B, stated running time 15:50)

- "Lay Lady Lay" – odds & sods
- "Hey Jude" – odds & sods
- "He Darked the Sun" – Linda Ronstadt session
- "Earl's Shuffle" – Harvey Mandel session

LP 2, side A (ADS2A, stated running time 17:21)

- "Getting Back to Molly" – Eric Clapton session
- "Cherrypicker" – Jeff Beck session
- "Kilpatrick's Defeat" – odds & sods
- "The Girl from Ipanema" – Harvey Mandel session
- "No One Knows" – Eric Clapton session

LP 2, side B (ADS2B, stated running time 15:42)

- "Living Like a Fool" – Linda Ronstadt session
- "Working in a Coalmine" – Jeff Beck session
- "Big City Woman" – Jeff Beck session
- "On the Rebound" – Keith Emerson session
