= Bunky and Jake =

American folk rock duo

- Label: Mercury Records
- Members: Andrea "Bunky" Skinner; Allan "Jake" Jacobs

Bunky and Jake were an American folk rock duo, who were a part of the New York folk music scene in the 1960s and 1970s. They merged folk, rock, R&B and blues. They are influenced heavily from the 50s classic pop and rock, such as Nolan Strong and the Diablos, the Crows, Dion and the Belmonts, the Mystics and the Passions.

== History ==
Andrea "Bunky" Skinner and Allan "Jake" Jacobs (who later formed Jake and The Family Jewels, a band with Jerry Burnham, Michael Epstein, Dan Mansolino), met in 1962 at the School of Visual Arts in New York and performed in the Greenwich Village folk circuit. The duo appeared at The Bitter End on the bill with Joni Mitchell and David Steinberg, and were written about in Rolling Stone. In 1965, Jacobs joined the folk-rock band The Magicians, with Garry Bonner, Alan Gordon, and John Townley. The band gained a following in New York, and took over as the house band from the Lovin' Spoonful at the Night Owl Cafe.

The Magicians disbanded in 1967, and Jacobs and Skinner signed with Mercury Records, releasing their 1968 debut album, Bunky & Jake. All songs on the first album were written by Skinner and/or Jacobs. Jake noted that the duo had a desire to make an album with much variety and drew upon influences such as Bobby Goldsboro, the Beach Boys, Django Reinhardt, and bossa nova, but stated that "things became too diversified, and the LP just didn’t hold together". At the time they were inexperienced and knew little about studio production. Jazz clarinetist Perry Robinson is one of the other musicians featured on album. Rolling Stone writes that the song "Daphne Plum” is "about a girl who makes the dope run". “Taxicab” is a song about protesting, while “The Candy Store” is a "tribute to group harmony and the old days".

The second album, L.A.M.F. (Mercury SR61199), was released a year later. In addition to original songs, included two by Chuck Berry, one by Don & Dewey, and a Jacobs-Skinner arrangement of "I Am the Light," by the Reverend Gary Davis. The band included Skinner (vocals and guitar); Jacobs (guitar and vocals); Douglas Haywood Rauch (bass); and Micheal Rosa (drums). Other musicians appearing were Mike Matthews, Charlie Chin (not the Chinese actor of the same name), Felix Pappalardi, Buzzy Linhart, Perry Robinson, Ray Barretto, Ernie Hayes, and Chuck Rainey.

The duo released a children's album Oo-Wee Little Children, on their own B&J Music label (cassette, 1993 and CD, 2004.)

Skinner died on Sunday, March 20, 2011, after a brief illness. As of April 2011, Jacobs lives in Manhattan. In October 2012, Jacobs released a new collection of songs on a 16-song CD entitled A Lick and a Promise by Jake and the Rest of the Jewels.

== Discography ==
- Bunky & Jake (1968)
- L.A.M.F. (1969)
