= Douglas Rodrigues =

Douglas Rodrigues or Rodríguez may refer to:

- Douglas Rodrigues (footballer) (born 1982), Brazilian footballer
- Douglas Rodríguez (boxer) (1950–2012), Cuban boxer
- Doug Rodrigues, American guitarist and songwriter
