= Terry Reid =

English musician (1949–2025)

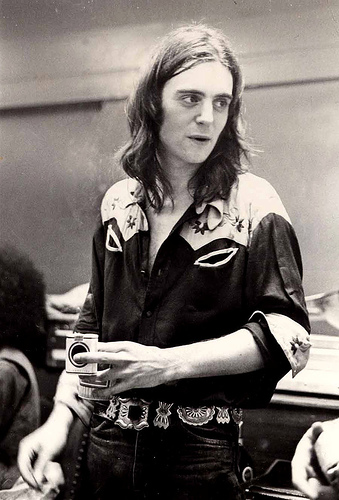
- Reid in 1974

Background information
- Born: Terrance James Reid; 13 November 1949; St Neots, Huntingdonshire, England
- Died: 4 August 2025 (aged 75) Rancho Mirage, California, U.S.
- Genres: Hard rock; folk rock; blue-eyed soul
- Occupations: Musician; songwriter
- Instruments: Vocals; guitar
- Years active: 1961–2025
- Labels: Columbia; ABC
- Formerly of: Peter Jay and the Jaywalkers
- Website: terryreid.com

Terrance James Reid (13 November 1949 – 4 August 2025), who was nicknamed Superlungs, was an English musician, songwriter and guitarist, best known for his emotive style of singing in appearances with high-profile musicians as vocalist, supporting act and session musician. As a solo recording and touring artist he released six studio albums and four live albums. Described as an "artists' artist" by Rolling Stone, Reid was recognised by his contemporaries as an eminent talent in English rock music, both as a guitarist and a vocalist. Robert Plant praised his vocal "flexibility, power and control" and Graham Nash was quoted as saying he should have been "a gigantic star".

Reid's music career began in the early 1960s. While performing in a local British club, he was invited to join Peter Jay and the Jaywalkers as lead vocalist and opened for The Rolling Stones on their 1966 tour. In the later '60s, Reid was solo supporting act for Rolling Stones, Cream, Jethro Tull and Fleetwood Mac tours. He turned down offers from Jimmy Page to be lead vocalist of the band that became Led Zeppelin, and from Ritchie Blackmore to front Deep Purple.

== Early life and education ==
Terrance James Reid was born in 1949 in Paxton Park Maternity Home, Little Paxton, St Neots, Huntingdonshire, England, the only child of Walter Reid, a salesman of cars and agricultural equipment, and Grace. He lived in the fens village of Bluntisham and attended St Ivo School, St Ives. He listened to classical music, Bulgarian folk and jazz, and was particularly inspired by the sound of American R&B and soul singers such as Otis Redding and Marvin Gaye. He bought his first guitar at the age of ten; he formed his first group, the Redbeats, at the age of 13, and they played in village halls and youth clubs. The other band members were in their late teens. At 14 he wrote his first song, "Without Expression", which many other artists later recorded. His father was supportive and persuaded his mother to allow him to pursue music as a career instead of "picking up potatoes in a muddy field", drove him to gigs, bought guitars and later accompanied him on tours.

== Career ==
=== 1960s ===
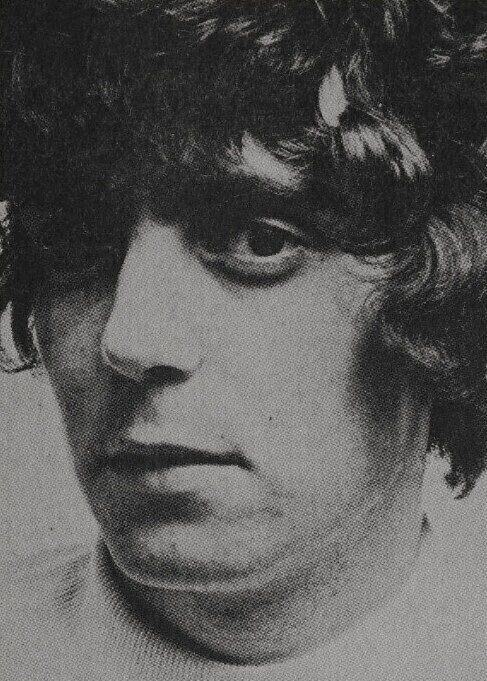
Reid in 1969, aged 19

After leaving school at the age of fifteen, Reid joined Peter Jay and the Jaywalkers after being spotted by the band's drummer, Peter Jay. At the time, Reid was playing for a local band, The Redbeats, who regularly performed at the River Club in St Ives. In 1966, The Jaywalkers were named as a support act for the Rolling Stones during their 23-show British Tour, from September to October 1966. At the concert at the Royal Albert Hall, Graham Nash of The Hollies became friends with Reid and suggested The Jaywalkers sign up with UK Columbia Records, an EMI label, to record with producer John Burgess. Their first single, the soul-inspired "The Hand Don't Fit the Glove" was a minor hit in 1967, but by then The Jaywalkers had disbanded.

Reid came to the attention of producer Mickie Most, who became his manager and who was in partnership with Peter Grant at the time. His first single with Most, "Better by Far", became a radio favourite. His debut album, Bang Bang, You're Terry Reid, was released in 1968. With accompanying musicians Eric Leese on organ and Keith Webb on drums, a 1968 tour of the United States with Cream did much to gain Reid a loyal following. His final performance of the tour at the Miami Pop Festival received positive reviews from the music press.

The song "Without Expression", from Bang Bang, You're Terry Reid, was written by Reid at age 14 and later recorded under different titles. The Hollies released it as "A Man with No Expression" in 1968, Crosby, Stills, Nash and Young recorded it as "Horses Through a Rainstorm" in 1969 (with Graham Nash once again singing lead), and REO Speedwagon covered it in 1973 as "Without Expression (Don't Be the Man)." John Mellencamp also included it on his greatest hits album The Best That I Could Do: 1978–1988. "Horses Through a Rainstorm" was slated to appear on Déjà Vu before being replaced at the last minute by Stephen Stills's "Carry On". Both versions were not released until years later.

==== Rejecting Led Zeppelin and Deep Purple ====
The style of what he was doing, that kind of opening up, he had a flexibility and power and control. So he could go, as Esther Phillips said, from a whisper to a scream in split seconds.

— Robert Plant

Yardbirds guitarist Jimmy Page, managed by Peter Grant, became interested in Reid's work. When The Yardbirds disbanded, Page wanted Reid to fill the vocalist spot for his proposed new group, the New Yardbirds, which later became Led Zeppelin. Reid had already committed to go on the road for two tours with the Rolling Stones and another with Cream (as an opening act on the 1968 US Tour). Reid suggested to Page that if he were compensated for the gig fees he would lose, and if Page would call Keith Richards to explain why Reid had to pull out of the US tours, Reid would try some things out with Page. It never happened, and Reid told Page to consider a young Birmingham-based singer, Robert Plant, having previously seen Plant's Band of Joy as a support act at one of his concerts. Reid also suggested that Page check out their drummer, John Bonham. Reid also rejected offers from Ritchie Blackmore to replace departing singer Rod Evans in Deep Purple; he said the music was "too metal" and not really his style. When questioned by music journalists about his passing up of Led Zeppelin and Deep Purple, Reid said he did not regret his decisions and was satisfied with his own career. He was reported in 2019 as saying "I don't sit around going over old coals".

=== 1969–1970s ===
In 1969, Reid played support on British tours, notably by Jethro Tull and Fleetwood Mac. Reid, Solley and Webb toured the United States again when he opened for the Rolling Stones on their 1969 American Tour. Reid did not appear at the Rolling Stones concert at Altamont Music Festival. Also in 1969, he released his second solo album, the self-titled Terry Reid, which spent five weeks on the Billboard Top LPs chart. "Friends", a song from this album, first appeared as a segue with his version of "Highway 61 Revisited". "Friends" was later covered by Arrival, and became a UK Top 10 hit for them in January 1970.

In December 1969, Reid fell out with producer Mickie Most, who wanted him to become a balladeer and follow Most's own formula. Before this, Reid had toured extensively in major venues in the US, including two tours with the Rolling Stones and another with Cream. In a contract dispute with Most and unable to record or release his music for four years, Reid concentrated on live work, mostly in the US, whilst awaiting the outcome of litigation. He lived in a "beach shack" in the hills of California and made sporadic UK performances during that period. In 1970, he returned briefly to England to perform at the Isle of Wight Festival with bass player Lee Miles, a former member of Ike & Tina Turner's band whom Reid met while touring the US with the Stones, and David Lindley and Tim Davis. He took part in the second Atlanta International Pop Festival in 1969, opened and closed the first Glastonbury Fayre in 1970 and was filmed performing at Glastonbury in 1971. He performed at Mick and Bianca Jagger's wedding in Saint-Tropez in 1971 in front of The Beatles, David Bowie and Brigitte Bardot.

Reid's fascination with Brazilian music and Latin rhythms began in 1969 when Gilberto Gil and Caetano Veloso were exiled by the military dictatorship of Brazil. Reid's attorney arranged for Gil to come to London, where he stayed at Reid's apartment in Notting Hill with a group of Brazilian musicians, who slept on his floor. When Reid performed at the Isle of Wight Festival on 27 August, Gilberto Gil and Caetano Veloso played on the same bill that night.

That same year, Reid was signed by Ahmet Ertegun to Atlantic Records, with his band consisting of David Lindley, Lee Miles and Alan White. They began recording in the UK and later switched to the US. White left to join Yes and Lindley left to tour with Jackson Browne. Lee Miles remained and accompanied Reid in his musical career for many years afterwards. The recordings made during this period formed Reid's third album, River, a "jazzy, moody album" which combined "Latin American groove, soul-funk and rock". The musicians on the album included Conrad Isidore on drums and Willie Bobo on percussion. Produced by Reid, engineered by Tom Dowd and mixed by Eddy Offord, River was released in 1973 and received favourable reviews, but failed commercially. The remainder of the material from those sessions was released in 2016 as The Other Side of The River. Around the time of River's release, Reid relocated from the UK to California and lived for the next three years in a commune in the desert mountains north of Los Angeles, on 180 acres of land owned by Bob Dylan, where he wrote his next album.

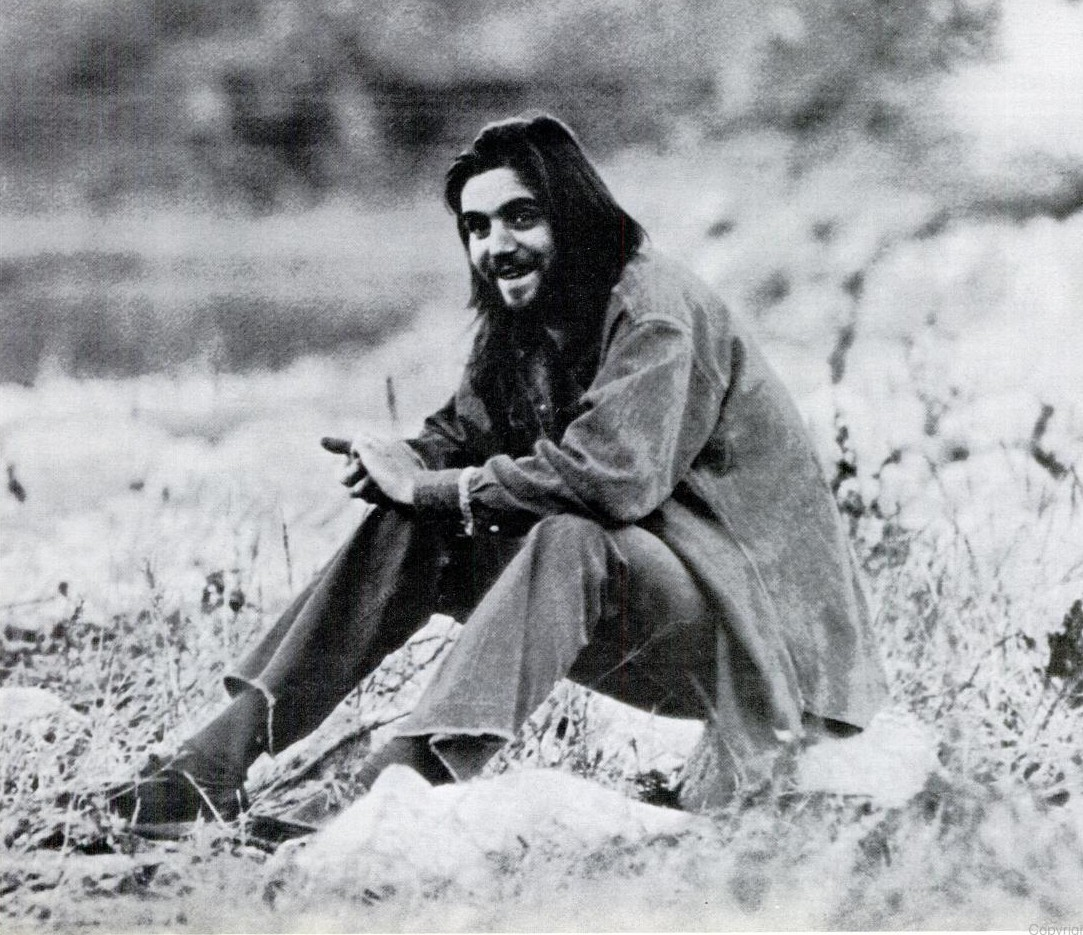
Reid in 1973 promoting River

Over the next decade, Reid switched to different labels in search of a winning formula. His fourth album, Seed of Memory, "a spiritual, ethereal piece of music", was released by ABC Records in 1976, produced by Graham Nash. ABC Records filed for bankruptcy the week the album was released, which derailed its sales. The next effort, an album entitled Rogue Waves, was produced by Chris Kimsey for Capitol Records and released in 1979. For Rogue Waves, Reid enlisted Lee Miles on bass, Doug Rodrigues on lead guitar and John Siomos on drums, recording at Brother's Studios in Santa Monica, California.

=== 1980s–1990s ===
Reid retired his solo career in 1981 to concentrate on session work, appearing on albums by Don Henley, Jackson Browne and Bonnie Raitt. In 1991, he returned with producer Trevor Horn for the WEA album The Driver. The album featured a cover version of "Gimme Some Lovin'", which also appeared on the soundtrack for the Tom Cruise movie Days of Thunder. Reid later looked back on The Driver unfavourably and said it was "unlistenable".

In the 1990s he fought "a bitter custody battle" over his daughters, which further slowed his career. He toured the US and Hong Kong with Mick Taylor. "Rich Kid Blues" appeared on an album released by Marianne Faithfull, produced by Mike Leander in 1984 but unreleased for 14 years. Reid and several friends put together an informal group in March 1993, calling themselves The Flew. Its members included Reid, Joe Walsh, Nicky Hopkins, Rick Rosas, and Phil Jones. They played one show at The Coach House in San Juan Capistrano, California. This was Nicky Hopkins' last public performance before his death.

In 1998, Reid recorded "In Love and War" for the finale episode of the Conan the Adventurer TV series scored by Charles Fox.

=== 2000s–2025 ===
In late 2002, Reid returned to the UK with longtime bass player Lee Miles for three shows at the WOMAD festival near Reading. This was his first live appearance in years. Reid had previously had a Monday night residency performing at a bar in Beverly Hills, California, which had attracted the attention of WOMAD organizer Thomas Brooman, who invited him to perform at the festival in 2002. In 2005, he returned for a UK tour, with London shows at The 100 Club and Ronnie Scott's Jazz Club. A venue billed him as "The Man with a Hell of a Story To Tell".

For appearances at festivals and his London shows Reid used a full band. Venues played included The Jazz Cafe, The Borderline, The 100 Club, and Dingwalls. He was invited to return to Ronnie Scott's Jazz Club in 2009 for a week. Reid had residencies there for several years after. In 2012, his album Live in London featured an entire set from one of his gigs at Ronnie Scott's and was released with no remixes or overdubs. Reid appeared at the Glastonbury Festival several times, as well as at other UK festivals, including the Isle of Wight, The Secret Garden (twice), The Rhythm Festival (twice), and All Tomorrows Parties.

During this period, EMI released a box set of his first two albums which included all of the sessions he had recorded for them between 1966 and 1970. The compilation was titled Superlungs. Seed of Memory and River became available on CD when they were reissued in the 2000s, bringing renewed interest in Reid's music. Reid also released a new live album, Alive, officially published by Sanctuary Records in 2004. Around this time, Reid began a residency at The Joint with Waddy Wachtel, Bernard Fowler and other special guests in Los Angeles, which featured performances from him every Monday for four years. Other artists who knew Reid joined him in these concerts, including Robert Plant, Keith Richards, Bobby Womack, Roger Daltrey, and Eric Burdon.

Reid's song "Dean" from the album River was used in the feature film The Criminal, produced in 1999 and released in 2001. Reid became good friends with the film's producer Chris Johnson, who also become Reid's business adviser. Johnson persuaded Reid to return to live work in the US in the early 2000s, and was in charge of arranging UK tours, recruiting players for Reid's band, arranging collaborations with other artists, organising back catalogue releases, licensing his songs for films, and lining up an acting role. Three of Reid's songs, "Seed of Memory", "To Be Treated Rite", and "Brave Awakening" were featured in the 2005 film The Devil's Rejects, directed by Rob Zombie. Reid's music featured in its 2019 sequel, 3 from Hell. In the 2005 film The Greatest Game Ever Played, Reid had a cameo as a golf caddy. His songs "Faith To Arise" and "Dean" were featured in the 2003 film Wonderland and "Faith To Arise" was featured in the 2017 film Win It All. In 2009, his song "Be Yourself", which he wrote for Graham Nash's Songs For Beginners, appeared in the film Up in the Air, directed by Jason Reitman.

In 2007, Reid began touring with American band Cosmic American Derelicts, who supported him on shows in 2008, 2014 and 2016, eventually becoming his "regular" band, as described by The Washington Post. He also performed with the Los Angeles-based music collective Wild Honey. In 2009, Reid worked with French trip hop act Shine and spent a week in Paris recording several tracks as guest vocalist. Shine Featuring Terry Reid was released as an EP that November. In 2012, Reid provided vocals for the song "Listen" by DJ Shadow, a bonus track on the compilation album Reconstructed: The Best of DJ Shadow.

Around this time, Reid worked on several other collaborations that, as of 2025, remained unreleased. Rap producer Dr. Dre reportedly became "fascinated" with Reid's 1976 album Seed of Memory, and the two collaborated on a reworking on the album with contributions from other rappers affiliated with Dr. Dre. Reid also made a guest appearance as vocalist with British band Alabama 3. Recordings from these sessions have not been released.

Superlungs, a feature-length documentary based on Reid's life and music career, began development in 2015 with music writer Richard Frias attached as director. However, the project faced difficulties during development as Reid became frustrated with its direction. Frias believed that he and Reid's disputes over the film were exacerbated by Reid's struggles with alcohol at the time. It was reported to still be in development as of October 2017, but has never fully released, as of 2025. (Note: Some sources have erroneously reported that the Superlungs documentary released in 2015 or 2016, or that production only began in 2020. A promotional clip to help bolster fundraising for the documentary's production was released in 2015, but Reid was apparently dissatisfied with this trailer, as reported by The Washington Post in April 2016.)

Reid continued to perform in his later years and appeared on stage in 2019 for Africa Express: The Circus, a concert coordinated by Damon Albarn. He played his final live show at The Half Moon in Putney, London, on 7 October 2024, with his band at the time, including Dzal Martin on guitar, Jennifer Maidman on bass, Chris Hillman on pedal steel, and Paul Jones on drums.

By June 2025, he was suffering from cancer and had to cancel a 2025 tour because of medical issues arising from his treatment.

== Personal life, illness and death ==
Reid had two daughters, Kelly and Holly, from his first marriage to his wife Lynne in the 1970s; Reid's daughters were the subject of a custody battle in the 1990s. By 1976, Reid was married to Susan Johnson, but the couple divorced in 1982 and Reid again remarried, in 2004, to Annette Grady. He had residences in La Quinta, California, and Palm Desert, California, by 2016. Later in life, Reid had issues with chain smoking and alcohol, but quit smoking and heavy drinking in 2016 following time in hospital.

He was diagnosed with cancer in June 2025. This was announced in July 2025 when fellow musician Angie Bruyere sought crowdfunding for his medical expenses. On a GoFundMe page, Bruyere wrote "Terry would never ask for this himself, which is why we’re asking for him".

Reid died of cancer in Rancho Mirage, California on 4 August 2025, aged 75. His death was announced the day after.

== Recognition and legacy ==
Aretha Franklin once said of Reid, "There are only three things happening in England: The Rolling Stones, The Beatles and Terry Reid."

Reid, an acknowledged outstanding vocalist, was for a brief period of time considered by Jimmy Page to take up vocals for the New Yardbirds, the group that became Led Zeppelin.

Many songs originally recorded by Reid have been covered by numerous artists including The Hollies, Crosby, Stills & Nash, Marianne Faithfull, Jack White with The Raconteurs, Chris Cornell, Arrival, Cheap Trick, Joe Perry, Iain Matthews and Rumer.

Reid's early song "Rich Kid Blues" was covered on an album by Marianne Faithfull in 1984. The UK artist Rumer recorded "Brave Awakening" on her Boys Don't Cry 2012 album and appeared at his London shows at the Jazz Cafe and Half Moon. Cheap Trick recorded Reid's "Speak Now" for their 1977 debut album. The Raconteurs with Jack White also recorded a version of Reid's "Rich Kid Blues" for their second album Consolers of the Lonely in 2008.

The American rock group The Split Squad recorded a cover of Reid's "Tinker Taylor" for their debut album, Now Hear This..., released in 2014. Joe Perry's album Sweetzerland Manifesto, released in 2018, features three tracks co-written and sung by Reid. In 2020, a recording of Chris Cornell covering Reid's "To Be Treated Rite" was released on his posthumous album No One Sings Like You Anymore, Vol. 1, which also included a cover of "Stay with Me Baby" based on Reid's own version.

Following Reid's death, Geoff Edgers wrote in The Washington Post that Reid's artistry charted "a line that would be traced by so many, such as John Mellencamp, the Replacements and Jason Isbell" with genres ranging from electric blues to Americana; Edgers compared Reid's vocals to the Black Crowes "born 20 years earlier" and eulogized his "voice that influenced many others".

== Discography ==
=== Studio albums ===
- Bang, Bang You're Terry Reid (1968) No. 153 on the Billboard Top LPs
- Terry Reid (1969) (US title: Move Over for Terry Reid) No. 147 on the Billboard Top LPs
- River (1973)
- Seed of Memory (1976)
- Rogue Waves (1978)
- The Driver (1991)

=== Compilations ===
- The Most of Terry Reid (1969)
- Super Lungs: The Complete Studio EMI Recordings 1966–1969 (2004)
- The Other Side of the River (2016, outtakes from River)

=== Live albums ===
- The Hand Don't Fit the Glove (1985)
- Alive (2004)
- Silver White Light – Live at the Isle of Wight 1970 (2004)
- Live in London (2012)

== Filmography ==
- Groupies (1970) features a performance of "Bang Bang" and "Superlungs My Supergirl", and backstage footage, recorded in San Francisco.
- Glastonbury Fayre (1972), directed by Nicolas Roeg, features "Dean", an extended jam with Linda Lewis.
- The Greatest Game Ever Played (2005) features an appearance from Reid in a cameo role as a golf caddy.
- The Session Man (2023) is a documentary on Nicky Hopkins that features appearances from Reid as part of The Flew.

== Use in other media ==
- Days of Thunder (1990), directed by Tony Scott, features "Gimme Some Lovin'".
- Conan the Adventurer (1997 TV series) features "In Love And War" in the final episode.
- The Criminal (produced in 1999 and released in 2001) features "Dean". Reid became good friends with the film's producer Chris Johnson, who also become Reid's business advisor.
- Wonderland (2003) features "Faith to Arise" and "Dean".
- The Devil's Rejects (2005), directed by Rob Zombie, features "Brave Awakening", "To Be Treated Rite" and "Seed of Memory".
- Up in the Air (2009) features "Be Yourself".
- The Summit (2013 documentary) features "July" over the closing credits.
- Win It All (2017) features "Faith to Arise".
- 3 from Hell (2019), directed by Rob Zombie, features "Faith to Arise", which is played over the end credits; "The Frame" is also heard on a car radio.
