= Nadyne Brewer =

American opera singer

- Died: May 18, 2010
- Occupation: Opera singer
- Children: Doug Rauch, Frederick Umoja
- Musical career
- Genres: Opera
- Instrument: Vocals
- Years active: 1940s–1990

Nadyne Brewer (died May 18, 2010) was an American opera singer and a member of the Metropolitan Opera chorus. A soprano early in her career, she later sang as a mezzo-soprano. Brewer also performed in recitals and concerts in New York and other cities.

== Early life and education ==
Brewer grew up in Kansas City, Kansas, where she attended local schools. She studied with William H. Hackney and at the Kansas City Conservatory of Music before attending the University of Kansas and Washburn University in Topeka.

In 1960 Brewer received a music degree from the University of Kansas School of Fine Arts and received several scholarships while studying there.

== Career ==
Brewer gave a benefit recital at Memorial Hall in Kansas City in the early 1940s. More than 2,000 people attended despite a snowstorm.

In 1947, she left Kansas City to become an understudy for contralto Marian Anderson. She later studied with vocal coaches in New York.

Brewer made her New York debut at Carnegie Recital Hall on January 30, 1954. Her program included two arias by Johann Sebastian Bach, Christoph Willibald Gluck's "Divinités du Styx", folk songs and works with instrumental accompaniment. The New York Times described her voice as "pure, fresh, well-controlled" and called the recital a "more than usually promising debut".

Nora Holt, writing in The New York Age, also reviewed the recital. She praised Brewer's musical skill, interpretation and stage manner, and wrote that Brewer changed her vocal color and interpretation to fit the music and text.

In January 1955, Brewer sang at St. Philip's Parish Hall in Brooklyn in a recital for the benefit of St. Barnabas P.E. Church in East New York. In April 1956, she sang at the Jewish Cultural Center in Newark at the 34th anniversary celebration of the Morgen Freiheit.

In 1957, Brewer was a soloist at the Stony Brook Music Festival, where pianist Milton Kaye performed music by George Gershwin.

By 1960, Brewer had toured in the Midwest, sung at Town Hall in New York and appeared on radio and television. A program that year consisted of Israeli songs, African-American spirituals and popular selections.

Brewer made her Metropolitan Opera debut in 1962. In 1964, she appeared as the Maid in Giuseppe Verdi's Simon Boccanegra.

Brewer gave another recital at Carnegie Recital Hall in March 1967. The New York Times, which identified her as a mezzo-soprano in the Metropolitan Opera chorus, reported that she sang Brahms's Four Serious Songs and songs by Hugo Wolf, Franz Schubert and Richard Strauss. The reviewer praised her "intelligence, sensitive phrasing and clear enunciation" and described her performances of Wolf's "Müh' voll komm ich und beladen" and Schubert's "Totengräbers Heimweh" as "haunting and beautiful".

In December 1968, Brewer returned to Kansas City for an appreciation concert at the World War II Memorial Building. Jet reported that more than 500 people attended the concert and that pianist Lucy Brown accompanied her.

Brewer remained with the Metropolitan Opera for many years. Her roles included an Orphan in Der Rosenkavalier, a Fisherwoman in Benjamin Britten's Peter Grimes, and the Page in Rigoletto. She appeared as the Page in a Metropolitan Opera concert performance of Rigoletto at Rutgers University on June 29, 1990.

In 2002, Brewer received the National Opera Association's "Lift Every Voice" Legacy Award.

== Personal life ==
Contemporary sources also identified Brewer by the surname Rauche. In 1968, The Call referred to her as "Mrs. Nadyne Rauche of New York City" and identified Fred Johnson as her son and Gussie Henderson as her grandmother. Jet identified her as "Nadyne Brewer (Rauche)" and also named Johnson as her son and Henderson as her grandmother.

Brewer was also the mother of bassist Doug Rauch, who played with Santana.

In a 1979 article in The Witness, William Howard Melish referred to her as "Mrs. Nadyne Brewer Rauch". Melish wrote that Brewer accompanied him to Ghana when Paul Robeson, who had been invited to attend a memorial observance for W. E. B. Du Bois, was unable to make the trip.

Fred Johnson was later known as Reverend Frederick Umoja. His obituary names his parents as Nadyne Brewer and Robert Johnson and names Douglas Rauch as his brother.

Brewer died on May 18, 2010.
