= Terry Reid (album) =

Studio album by Terry Reid
- Released: August 1969
- Recorded: 1969
- Studio: England
- Genre: Rock; pop; folk
- Length: 39:49
- Label: Columbia; Epic
- Producer: Mickie Most

Terry Reid chronology
Bang, Bang You're Terry Reid (1968)	Terry Reid (1969)	River (1973)

Professional ratings
Review scores
Source	Rating
AllMusic	4.5/5 stars

Terry Reid is the second studio album by Terry Reid, recorded in 1969 (U.S. reissue title Move Over for Terry Reid). The album spent five weeks on the US Billboard Top LPs chart, hitting its peak position at No. 147 on November 8, 1969.

The ninth track, "Rich Kid Blues", was the eponymous song on an album released by Marianne Faithfull, produced by Mike Leander in 1971 but unreleased for 14 years until 1985.

The iconic photograph of Reid on the album cover was taken by photographer/music producer Terry Manning.

== Track listing ==
All tracks are written by Terry Reid except where indicated.

Side one
No.	Title	Writer(s)	Length
1.	"Superlungs My Supergirl"	Donovan Leitch	4:17
2.	"Silver White Light"		2:51
3.	"July"		2:28
4.	"Marking Time"		3:45
5.	"Stay with Me Baby"	George David Weiss, Jerry Ragovoy (Note: Incorrectly attributed to "Simmonds-Youlden-Peverett" (Savoy Brown song of the same name) on the record label.)	4:10

Side two
No.	Title	Writer(s)	Length
1.	"Highway 61 Revisited/Friends"	Bob Dylan/Terry Reid	7.58
2.	"May Fly"		3:41
3.	"Speak Now or Forever Hold Your Peace"		4:24
4.	"Rich Kid Blues"		4:15

== Personnel ==
=== Musicians ===
- Terry Reid – vocals, guitar
- Peter Solley – keyboards
- Keith Webb – drums

=== Technical ===
- Mickie Most – producer
- Martin Birch – engineer

== Charts ==
Chart (1969)	Peak position
US Billboard Top LPs	147
