= Music (Music album) =

1971 studio album by the American rock band Music

Studio album by Music
- Released: 1971
- Recorded: 1970
- Studios: Electric Lady Studios, New York City
- Genre: Rock
- Label: Eleuthera
- Producers: Music, Eddie Kramer

Music is the only studio album by the American rock band Music, consisting of Buzzy Linhart, guitarist Doug Rodrigues, bassist Doug Rauch and drummer John Siomos. The album was produced by Music and Eddie Kramer. Recorded in 1970, it was released in 1971 by Eleuthera Records.

== Background ==
Linhart and guitarist Doug Rodrigues had previously played together in the Seventh Sons. Rodrigues and drummer John Siomos also played together in Mitch Ryder's band.

By 1969, Linhart, Rodrigues, bassist Doug Rauch and Siomos were performing together as the Buzzy Linhart Quartet. They then called the group Music.

In 1970, Music recorded its self-titled album, which was released on Eleuthera Records in 1971.

== Recording ==
Music was recorded in 1970, with sessions at Electric Lady Studios in New York City. Eddie Kramer engineered and co-produced the recordings with the band.

Mark "Moogy" Klingman contributed keyboards and David Bromberg added guitar and dobro.

The songs included originals written by Linhart along with Fred Neil's "The Bag I'm In", Tim Hardin's "You Got a Reputation", and Jerry Leiber and Mike Stoller's "Searchin'".

== Release ==
Music was released on Eleuthera Records as ELS 3601 in 1971. Eleuthera was associated with Artie Kornfeld and distributed by Buddah Records.

Eleuthera Records was launched in 1970.

After Eleuthera ceased operations, the album was reissued as part of the two-LP set Buzzy Linhart Is Music, which paired the Music recordings with material from Linhart's earlier album Buzzy.

== Reception ==
Record World called the album "funky and melodic" saying it "should get right on the progressive stations" proclaiming "Hit, hit, hit"

In a 1972 review in the St. Petersburg Times, Chick Ober praised the album's arrangements and Linhart's performance on "Kilpatrick's Defeat".

AllMusic's Joe Viglione called Music "a solid effort" with a heavier sound than Linhart's solo work, highlighting the playing of Linhart, Doug Rodrigues, Doug Rauch and John Siomos. He also noted Klingman and Bromberg.

In 2012, Joseph Tortelli wrote that Music was recorded at Electric Lady Studios before the studio officially opened and was Eddie Kramer's first rock LP production credit.

== Track listing ==
Side one
No.	Title	Writer(s)	Length
1.	"The Bag I'm In"	Fred Neil
2.	"You Got a Reputation"	Tim Hardin
3.	"Time to Go"	Buzzy Linhart
4.	"Talk About a Morning"	Buzzy Linhart

Side two
No.	Title	Writer(s)	Length
1.	"If You Love Me"	Buzzy Linhart
2.	"Everybody's Got"	Buzzy Linhart
3.	"Don't You Know"	Buzzy Linhart
4.	"Mother's Red Light"	Buzzy Linhart
5.	"Kilpatrick's Defeat"	Mark "Moogy" Klingman, Michael Gayle
6.	"Searchin'"	Jerry Leiber, Mike Stoller

Track listing adapted from AllMusic and the Eleuthera album discography.

== Personnel ==
Credits adapted from AllMusic.

Music

- Buzzy Linhart – vocals, rhythm guitar, vibraphone, percussion
- Doug Rodrigues – lead guitar, percussion
- Doug Rauch – bass, guitar, percussion
- John Siomos – drums

Additional musicians

- Mark "Moogy" Klingman – piano, organ
- David Bromberg – guitar, dobro

Production

- Eddie Kramer – producer, engineer
- Music – producer
- Bob Ludwig – mastering
- Frank Yandolino – art direction, design

== Later releases ==
The recordings were later included on the double album Buzzy Linhart Is Music.

The sessions were revisited in 2012 for Electric Lady Dream: The Eddie Kramer Sessions. The release included material from the original sessions and a previously unreleased song "The Birds".
