= River (Terry Reid album) =

Studio album by Terry Reid
- Released: 1973
- Length: 35:06
- Label: Atlantic
- Producer: Tom Dowd

Terry Reid chronology
Terry Reid (1969)	River (1973)	Seed of Memory (1976)

Professional ratings
Review scores
Source	Rating
AllMusic	4/5 stars

River is the third studio album by English vocalist Terry Reid. It was released in 1973 by Atlantic Records. It was produced by Tom Dowd and written by Terry Reid.

== Critical reception ==
Chris Jones of BBC Review called River a “masterpiece” comparing Reid’s "funky folk blues" as "evolving into a similar abstraction" as Van Morrison’s Astral Weeks, writing "It’s this jazz abstraction that makes River such a pleasure". Jones commented on "the deeply charged emotion and pioneering spirit" of the recording process arguing that while "the meandering scat style is hard to grasp at first", "Lindley's guitar work is as fluid as Reid's way with words."

== Track listing ==
All tracks are written by Terry Reid.

No.	Title	Length
1.	"Dean"	4:45
2.	"Avenue"	5:08
3.	"Things to Try"	4:25
4.	"Live Life"	5:11
5.	"River"	5:45
6.	"Dream"	5:20
7.	"Milestones"	5:52

== Personnel ==
- Terry Reid - vocals, guitar
- David Lindley - electric guitar, steel guitar, slide guitar, violin
- Lee Miles - bass guitar
- Conrad Isidore - drums
- Willie Bobo - all percussion parts on "River"
