= Betty Davis (album) =

1973 debut studio album by Betty Davis

Studio album by Betty Davis
- Released: 1973
- Recorded: 1972–73
- Studio: Wally Heider Studios in San Francisco
- Genre: Funk rock
- Length: 29:13
- Label: Just Sunshine
- Producer: Greg Errico

Betty Davis chronology
Betty Davis (1973)	They Say I'm Different (1974)

Betty Davis is the debut studio album by American funk singer Betty Davis, released through Just Sunshine Records (an upstart label) in 1973. The album was produced by Greg Errico and features contributions from a number of noted musicians, including Neal Schon, Merl Saunders, Sylvester, Larry Graham, Pete Sears, and The Pointer Sisters.

In 2007, the album was re-issued on CD and vinyl by the Light in the Attic label.

== Background ==
Before the album's release, Davis was best known as the second wife of jazz trumpeter Miles Davis, and also as the featured model on the front cover of the jazz legend's 1968 album Filles de Kilimanjaro. The song "Mademoiselle Mabry" from the album is dedicated to Betty (whose maiden-name is Mabry) and was recorded around the time of their marriage in September 1968. Unbeknownst to most, the then-23-year-old Davis was herself a professional model and also a performer of soul and funk music, having written for the Chambers Brothers and put out a single on Don Costa's DCP imprint. Davis was a known face in emerging musical circles who had a strong stylistic and musical influence on her former husband (she personally introduced him to Jimi Hendrix) during their short marriage, which ended after just a year.

== Writing and recording ==
In the early 1970s, after a stint of modeling in the UK, a 28-year-old Davis moved to Los Angeles, California, in order to record with Santana but soon changed her focus and with help from Greg Errico (of Sly & The Family Stone), assembled a rich list of veteran Bay Area musicians to record her own material. These included Neal Schon (of Santana), Larry Graham and several other members of Graham Central Station, as well as Merl Saunders, Pete Sears, Sylvester and The Pointer Sisters (who performed backing vocals). The resulting album was recorded between 1972 and 1973 and, while primarily a funk-soul album, was stylistically eclectic, reflecting the wide array of musicians who played on the record.

The songs, all written by Davis herself, are mostly built around funk grooves, driving percussion and heavy guitars. Davis' vocal stylings are expressive and boisterous (as on "If I'm In Luck I Might Get Picked Up"), but also playful and sensual (as on "Anti Love Song"). On the former, she boldly sings: "I'm wigglin' my fanny, I'm raunchy dancing, I'm-a-doing it doing it." "Steppin' In Her I. Miller Shoes", tells the story of a talented young woman who comes to the 'jungle' with big dreams, only to end up a tragic victim of the entertainment industry. The up-tempo song features hard rock guitars and backing vocals by The Pointer Sisters. In a 2007 interview Davis revealed that the song was based on the life of Devon Wilson, a one-time girlfriend of Jimi Hendrix with whom Davis had been close friends. Wilson is also the subject of "Dolly Dagger" by Hendrix. With their hard-funk/rock-fused sounds, few of the songs catered to radio play; perhaps the closest is "In The Meantime", featuring prominent organ and the most restrained and straightforward performance on the album.

== Critical reception ==
Professional ratings
Review scores
Source	Rating
AllMusic	4.5/5 stars
Creem	B−
Down Beat	3.5/5 stars
Mojo	5/5 stars
Pitchfork	8.9/10
Popmatters	9/10
Stylus Magazine	A

In a retrospective review, Popmatters called Betty Davis "funk like no other. Its closest musical relation is Sly Stone's early '70s molasses", praising her performance on the album as "a slow cooker of unbridled lust that teases and passes each beat, and flicks and licks each chord." The magazine noted Davis' "frequent reversing of gender roles and expectations to demonstrate control and strength" Likewise, John Bush of AllMusic called it "an outstanding funk record, driven by her [Davis'] aggressive, no-nonsense songs".

In his 1990 biography, Miles Davis said of his former wife's musical legacy: "If Betty were singing today she'd be something like Madonna, something like Prince, only as a woman. She was the beginning of all that when she was singing as Betty Davis." Oliver Wang's liner notes from the 2007 re-issue of the album also include the following statement by Carlos Santana: "She was the first Madonna, but Madonna is more like Marie Osmond compared to Betty Davis. Betty was a real ferocious Black Panther woman. You couldn't tame Betty Davis." Robert Christgau was less enthusiastic, jokingly referring to the music as the "most overstated comic-book sex since Angelfood McSpade" Although Robert Crumb's character is perhaps a satirical critique, Christgau with this comment is flat-out racist.

== Track listing ==
All songs written by Betty Davis Original LP configuration:

=== Side one ===
1. "If I'm in Luck I Might Get Picked Up" – 5:00
2. "Walkin' Up the Road" – 2:55
3. "Anti Love Song" – 4:32
4. "Your Man My Man" – 3:39

=== Side two ===
1. "Ooh Yeah" – 3:09
2. "Steppin' in Her I. Miller Shoes" – 3:15
3. "Game Is My Middle Name" – 5:12
4. "In the Meantime" – 2:44

The CD reissue includes three previously unreleased bonus tracks, all from the same album sessions.

1. "Come Take Me" – 3:56
2. "You Won't See Me in the Morning" – 3:50
3. "I Will Take That Ride" – 4:43

== Personnel ==
- Betty Davis – lead and backing vocals
- Larry Graham, Doug Rauch – bass
- Gregg Errico – drums
- Willie Sparks – drums
- Neal Schon – guitar
- Doug Rodrigues – guitar
- Pete Sears – piano
- Richard Kermode – piano, clavinet
- Merl Saunders – electric piano, clavinet
- Hershall Kennedy – organ, clavinet, backing vocals
- Victor Pantoja – congas
- Mic Gillette – trombone
- Greg Adams – trumpet
- Skip Mesquite – saxophone
- Jules Broussard – baritone saxophone
- The Pointer Sisters, Sylvester, Patryce Banks, Kathi McDonald, Annie Sampson, Willy Sparks – backing vocals

== Charts ==
Chart performance for Betty Davis
Chart (1973)	Peak position
US Bubbling Under the Top LPs (Billboard)	202
US Top R&B/Hip-Hop Albums (Billboard)	54
