= Nasty Gal (album) =

Studio album by Betty Davis
- Released: 1975
- Recorded: May 1975
- Genre: Funk
- Length: 39:15
- Label: Island
- Producer: Betty Davis

Betty Davis chronology
They Say I'm Different (1974)	Nasty Gal (1975)	Is It Love or Desire? (2009)

Nasty Gal is the third studio album by American funk musician Betty Davis. It was released in 1975 on Island Records and was Davis' first album on a major label.

It failed commercially upon release, and after the failure of this album Island Records shelved her planned follow-up, Is It Love or Desire?, until 2009. Under pressure by the record company, Davis abandoned her music career altogether shortly after this album's release. It was reissued on Light in the Attic Records in 2009 on CD, and again in 2018 on colored vinyl in conjunction with record club Vinyl Me, Please, which has rekindled interest in the album by music critics and fans, generating favorable retrospective reviews.

== Background ==
After the underground success of her previous two records, Davis toured extensively with a backup band called "Funk House" that included Nicky Neal, Larry Johnson, Fred Mills, and Carlos Morales. Her tours were marked by her exuding sexuality. When ABC acquired her previous label Just Sunshine and its parent distributor Blue Thumb Records, Island Records approached Davis with a buyout offer. After accepting, Davis started working on new material for an album. On Davis' previous two albums, she relied on a multitude of session musicians, but felt a close connection with Funk House, so she chose to record the album with them instead.

== Critical reception ==
Retrospective reviews
Review scores
Source	Rating
AllMusic	4.5/5 stars
Pitchfork	8.4/10
Spectrum Culture	4.5/5 stars

Initial reviews for the album were unfavorable. Critics believed Davis' image eclipsed her actual talent. Davis had plans to release a fourth album, Is It Love or Desire?, and even recorded a few tracks before being ultimately shelved by Island. These sessions, which had featured Herbie Hancock, Chuck Rainey, Alphonse Mouzon, among others, were released in 2009 by Light in the Attic. After becoming disillusioned with the music industry, Davis retired.

After Light in the Attic reissued Davis' discography, contemporary reviews cropped up and have been much more positive, often noting that the album displays potential wasted by Island Records' dismissal of Davis' music and style.

== Track listing ==
All tracks are written by Betty Davis, except where noted.

This Side
No.	Title	Writer(s)	Length
1.	"Nasty Gal"		4:35
2.	"Talkin Trash"		4:40
3.	"Dedicated to the Press"	Betty Davis, Larry Johnson	3:40
4.	"You and I"	Betty Davis, Miles Davis	2:45
5.	"Feelins"		2:42

That Side
No.	Title	Writer(s)	Length
1.	"F.U.N.K."		4:20
2.	"Gettin Kicked Off, Havin Fun"		3:07
3.	"Shut Off the Light"		3:53
4.	"This Is It!"	Betty Davis, Larry Johnson, Fred Mills, Carlos Morales, Nicky Neal	3:25
5.	"The Lone Ranger"		6:08
Total length:			39:15

== Charts ==
Chart performance for Nasty Gal
Chart (1976)	Peak position
Australian Albums (Kent Music Report)	96
US Top R&B/Hip-Hop Albums (Billboard)	54

== Personnel ==
Adapted from LP liner notes.

- Betty Davis – vocals, producer, arrangement
- Larry Johnson – bass guitar
- Nicky Neal – drums, backing vocals
- Fred Mills – keyboards, vocals on "Nasty Gal", backing vocals
- Carlos Morales – lead guitar, lead vocals on "Gettin Kicked Off, Havin Fun", backing vocals
- Errol Bennett – congas
- James Allen Smith – synthesizer
- Buddy Williams – bass drum
- Gil Evans – conductor and arrangement on "You and I"
- Bob Clearmountain – engineering
- Josea Rodriguez – mastering
