= They Say I'm Different =

Studio album by Betty Davis
- Released: 1974
- Recorded: 1973
- Studio: Record Plant, Sausalito
- Genre: Funk
- Length: 32:52 (original 1974 release); 51:60 (2007 re-release)
- Label: Just Sunshine (1974); Light in the Attic (2007 re-release)
- Producer: Betty Davis

Betty Davis chronology
Betty Davis (1973)	They Say I'm Different (1974)	Nasty Gal (1975)

They Say I'm Different is the second studio album by Betty Davis. It was released in 1974.

== Legacy ==
The Wire placed They Say I'm Different in their list of "100 Records That Set the World on Fire (While No One Was Listening)". In 2017 a documentary called Betty: They Say I'm Different was released.

Professional ratings
Review scores
Source	Rating
AllMusic	4.5/5 stars
Mojo	4/5 stars
Pitchfork	8.6

"Shoo-B-Doop and Cop Him" was sampled by Ice Cube on his song "Once Upon A Time In The Projects".

== Track listing ==
All songs written by Betty Davis

No.	Title	Length
1.	"Shoo-B-Doop and Cop Him"	3:57
2.	"He Was a Big Freak"	4:07
3.	"Your Mama Wants Ya Back"	3:27
4.	"Don't Call Her No Tramp"	4:06
5.	"Git in There"	4:46
6.	"They Say I'm Different"	4:14
7.	"70's Blues"	4:01
8.	"Special People"	3:22
Total length:		32:00

2007 Bonus Tracks - Record Plant Rough Mixes (10/9/73)
No.	Title	Length
9.	"He Was a Big Freak" (Record Plant Rough Mix)	4:43
10.	"Don't Call Her No Tramp" (Record Plant Rough Mix)	4:37
11.	"Git in There" (Record Plant Rough Mix)	4:38
12.	"70's Blues" (Record Plant Rough Mix)	5:02

== Personnel ==
- Betty Davis - vocals
- Debbie Burrell - vocals
- Elaine Clark - vocals
- Mary Jones - vocals
- Trudy Perkins - vocals
- Mike Clark - drums
- Nicky Neal - drums, vocals
- Willy Sparks - drums, vocals
- Ted Sparks - drums
- Pete Escovedo - timbales
- Victor Pantoja - congas, percussion
- Errol "Crusher" Bennett - percussion
- Buddy Miles - guitar
- Jimmy Godwin - guitar
- Cordell Dudley - guitar, vocals
- Carlos Morales - guitar, vocals
- Larry Johnson - bass
- Merl Saunders - electric piano
- Fred Mills - keyboards, vocals
- James Allen Smith - keyboards
- Hershall Kennedy - Clavinet, keyboards, organ, electric piano, trumpet, vocals
- Tony Vaughn - bass vocal, Clavinet, keyboards, piano, electric piano, vocals

Technical

- Mel Dixon - photography
- Bob Edwards - assistant engineer
- Tom Flye - mixing
- Ron Levine - cover design
- Bill Levy - art direction

== Charts ==
1974 chart performance for They Say I'm Different
Chart (1974)	Peak position
US Top R&B/Hip-Hop Albums (Billboard)	46

2023 chart performance for They Say I'm Different
Chart (2023)	Peak position
German Albums (Offizielle Top 100)	41
