= Friends (Terry Reid song) =

1969 song by Terry Reid

"Highway 61 Revisited/Friends/Highway 61 Revisited"

Song by Terry Reid

from the album Terry Reid
- Released: August 1969
- Recorded: 1969
- Genre: Psychedelic rock; folk rock; blues rock
- Length: 8:00
- Label: Columbia; Epic
- Songwriters: Bob Dylan; Terry Reid
- Producer: Mickie Most

"Friends" is a song written and originally recorded by British vocalist and musician Terry Reid, released on his eponymous album in August 1969. It was included as a medley with a cover of Bob Dylan's "Highway 61 Revisited", in which "Friends" was sandwiched in between the two halves of the Dylan song.

== Arrival version ==
"Friends"

Single by Arrival

from the album Arrival
- B-side: "Don't Take His Love Away"
- Released: 28 November 1969
- Recorded: 1969
- Genre: Pop
- Length: 4:14
- Label: Decca
- Songwriter: Terry Reid
- Producer: Alex Murray

Arrival singles chronology
"Friends" (1969)	"I Will Survive" (1970)

In November 1969, pop rock band Arrival released a cover of "Friends" as their debut single. The song featured lead vocals by Dyan Birch and was arranged by Arrival and Paul Buckmaster. It peaked at number 8 on the UK Singles Chart in January 1970.

=== Reception ===
Reviewing for New Musical Express, Derek Johnson wrote that Birch has a "great presence and her vital soul-flecked styling is enhanced by powerful harmonies from the rest of the team. The backing piano, underlying deep-throated strings and walloping beat is impressive and the material is way above average. A very good disc indeed". However, guest reviewing for Melody Maker, Jon Lord of Deep Purple wrote that "there are so many songs with that sort of beginning and that sort of chorus line" and that "there is nothing special about it".

=== Charts ===
Chart (1970)	Peak position
Ireland (IRMA)	8
UK Singles (Official Charts)	8
Rhodesia (Lyons Maid)	13
