= Rogue Waves =

Studio album by Terry Reid
- Released: 1978
- Studios: Brother, Santa Monica
- Genre: Rock
- Length: 44:04
- Label: Capitol
- Producers: Chris Kimsey, Terry Reid

Terry Reid chronology
Seed of Memory (1976)	Rogue Waves (1978)	The Driver (1991)

Rogue Waves is the fifth studio album by the English vocalist and musician Terry Reid, released in 1978 by Capitol Records. It was produced by Chris Kimsey with Terry Reid and recorded at Brother Recording Studio, the Beach Boys Studio.

== Critical reception ==
Professional ratings
Review scores
Source	Rating
AllMusic	2.0/5 stars
Omaha World-Herald	4/5 stars

The Omaha World-Herald deemed the album "relaxed and bluesy rock."

Bill Missett of the North County Times praised the album, highlighting the singer's rough vocals and strong guitar playing. John Levesque of the North Bay Nugget wrote that Rogue Waves demonstrated that it was still possible to bring new life to the heavy rock genre.

John Kiely of the Waterloo Region Record said the album contained well-defined music with tight and intriguing arrangements. He praised its production, describing it as a well-produced and "above all, listenable" rock album from "a guitarist who knows how to make it."

== Track listing ==
All tracks composed by Terry Reid except where noted.

1. "Ain't No Shadow" – 3:57
2. "Baby I Love You" (Phil Spector, Ellie Greenwich, Jeff Barry) – 4:04
3. "Stop and Think It Over" – 3:45
4. "Rogue Wave" – 5:58
5. "Walk Away Renée" (Michael Brown, Bob Calilli, Tony Sansone) – 4:24
6. "Believe in the Magic" – 6:49
7. "Then I Kissed Her" (Phil Spector, Ellie Greenwich, Jeff Barry) – 4:37
8. "Bowangi" – 4:29
9. "All I Have to Do Is Dream" (Boudleaux Bryant) – 5:39

== Personnel ==
- Terry Reid – guitar, vocals
- Lee Miles – bass
- Doug Rodrigues – lead guitar
- John Siomos – drums, percussion
- Sterling Smith – organ
- James E. Johnson – organ
- Denise Williams – background vocals
- Dyanne Chandler – background vocals
- Maxinne Willard – background vocals
- Terrence James – string arrangement
- Produced by Chris Kimsey and Terry Reid and recorded at Brother's Studio, Santa Monica
- Mastered by Ted Jensen at Sterling Sound, NYC
