= Free Creek =

English-American rock supergroup

Free Creek was a band composed of many internationally renowned musical artists, including Eric Clapton, Jeff Beck, Keith Emerson, Mitch Mitchell and Linda Ronstadt, who recorded one album, in 1969, in a "super session" format.

== Personnel ==
- Billy Chesboro - conductor
- Earle Doud - conductor, vocals

=== Vocals ===
- Tom Cosgrove
- Hilda Harris
- Timmy Harrison
- Eric Mercury
- Geri Miller
- Linda Ronstadt
- Valerie Simpson
- Maretha Stewart

=== Brass, woodwinds, strings ===
- Bill Chase Trumpet
- Chris Darrow Violin
- Bob Dean Trombone
- Louis del Gatto Trombone
- Joe Farrell Flute
- Harry Hall Trumpet
- Bob Keller Trombone
- Tom "Bones" Malone Trombone
- Meco Monardo Trombone
- Larry Packer Violin
- Alan Rubin Trumpet
- Lew Soloff Trumpet
- Chris Wood Flute

=== Drums, percussion ===
- Richard Crooks Drums
- Adolfo de la Parra Drums
- Didymus Percussion
- Roy Markowitz Drums
- Mitch Mitchell Drums
- John Ware Drums

=== Keyboards ===
- Dr. John Piano
- Keith Emerson Organ
- Jimmy Greenspoon Keyboards
- Mark "Moogy" Klingman Organ
- Bob Smith Organ

=== Guitar, bass ===
- Jeff Beck (as "A.N. Other") Guitar
- Delaney Bramlett Guitar
- Eric Clapton (as "King Cool") Guitar
- Richard Davis Bass
- Howard "Buzz" Feiten Guitar
- Carol Hunter Guitar
- Bernie Leadon Guitar
- John London Bass
- Harvey Mandel Guitar
- Chuck Rainey Bass
- Elliott Randall Guitar
- Red Rhodes Guitar (Steel)
- Douglas Rodriguez Guitar
- Todd Rundgren Guitar
- Larry Taylor Bass
- Jack Wilkins Guitar
- Stu Woods Bass

== Discography ==
- 1973 Music From Free Creek (Charisma) (2 album set, reissued 1976 by Charisma Records as Summit Meeting. CD reissue 2002 and 2006 by Lake Eerie Records; recorded 1969)
