= Soul rock =

Soul rock may refer to:

- Psychedelic soul, a music genre where black soul musicians embrace elements of psychedelic rock
- Progressive soul, soul music that takes inspiration from progressive rock bands/artists
- Blue-eyed soul, rhythm and blues and soul music performed by white artists
- Brown-eyed soul, a music genre of soul music performed in the United States mainly by Latinos in Southern California
- Cinematic soul, a music genre combining traditional rock/soul arrangements with orchestral instruments
- Plastic soul, soul music that is believed to lack authenticity

== See also ==
- Rock and Soul (disambiguation)
- "Soul Rock", a song by Billy Ocean, from the 1976 album Billy Ocean
- Soul Rocker, a Mexican luchador
- Solrock, a Pokémon
