= Seed of Memory =

Studio album by Terry Reid
- Released: 1976
- Studio: Sound Labs, Hollywood; Rudy Records, San Francisco
- Genre: Rock
- Length: 42:43
- Label: ABC
- Producer: Graham Nash

Terry Reid chronology
River (1973)	Seed of Memory (1976)	Rogue Waves (1979)

Professional ratings
Review scores
Source	Rating
AllMusic	3.5/5 stars

Seed of Memory is the fourth studio album by English vocalist Terry Reid, released in 1976 by ABC Records. It was produced by Graham Nash and written by Terry Reid. It was re-released in 2004. The songs "Brave Awakening", "Seed of Memory" and "To Be Treated Rite" were used in the 2005 film The Devil's Rejects. Additionally, "Faith to Arise" was featured on the soundtrack to the 2003 film Wonderland, as well as the 2019 film 3 from Hell.

== Track listing ==
All tracks are written by Terry Reid.

No.	Title	Length
1.	"Faith to Arise"	4:39
2.	"Seed of Memory"	5:26
3.	"Brave Awakening"	6:32
4.	"To Be Treated Rite"	5:54
5.	"Ooh Baby (Make Me Feel So Young)"	3:57
6.	"The Way You Walk"	4:43
7.	"The Frame"	4:37
8.	"Fooling You"	7:20

== Personnel ==
- Terry Reid – guitar, vocals, harmonica
- David Lindley – acoustic & slide guitar, violin
- Graham Nash – harmony vocals
- Plas Johnson – saxophone
- Blue Mitchell – trumpet
- Tim Weisberg – flute
- Al Viola – balalaika
- Ben Keith – pedal steel
- Joel Bernstein – acoustic guitar
- Jesse Erlich – cello
- James Gadson – drums
- Lee Miles – bass
- Al Perkins – pedal steel
- Soko Richardson – drums
- Clifford Solomon – horn
- Fred Wesley – horn
- Produced by Graham Nash and recorded at Sound Labs, Hollywood and Rudy Records, San Francisco.
