= Ike White =

American singer-songwriter, composer and musician (1945–2018)

Ike White (born Milton David White; 1945 – 2014) was an American soul, funk and rhythm and blues musician best known for his 1976 album Changin’ Times, recorded while he was incarcerated in a California state prison. The album has since been reassessed in retrospective journalism and documentary film, and is frequently cited as an example of commercially released music recorded inside the United States prison system.

White was born Milton David White in 1945 in California, United States. He was convicted of murder as a teenager and sentenced to life imprisonment in California, where he began developing his musical practice through collaboration with other inmates and informal performance.

During his incarceration, White attracted the attention of music producer Jerry Goldstein, who arranged for professional musicians and recording equipment to be brought into the prison environment. The resulting sessions produced White's only studio album, Changin’ Times (1976), which blended soul, funk and R&B with jazz-influenced arrangements.

Following his release from prison in 1979 after approximately 14 years, White briefly engaged with the music industry but did not establish a sustained recording career. He later withdrew from public life, and accounts of his later life remain limited and inconsistent in available sources.

== Early life ==
White was born Milton David White in 1945 in California, United States.

== Incarceration and musical development ==
White was convicted of murder as a teenager and sentenced to life imprisonment in California. During his incarceration, he developed his musical abilities, performing and composing music within the prison system.

He later came to the attention of producer Jerry Goldstein, who, along with collaborators including session musicians associated with funk and soul groups, arranged for recording equipment to be installed inside the prison. According to retrospective reporting, the sessions were facilitated under unusually permissive conditions for the period and resulted in a fully produced studio album recorded on-site.

== Music career ==
White's only studio album, Changin’ Times, was recorded inside Tehachapi State Prison in California and released in 1976. The album incorporates elements of soul, funk and rhythm and blues, and has been described in retrospective coverage as emotionally reflective, with themes relating to incarceration, identity, and social struggle.

Although the album received limited commercial attention at the time of release, it was later reassessed in documentary and journalistic accounts and developed a cult following among collectors of 1970s funk and soul music.

== Release and later life ==
White was released from prison in 1979 after approximately 14 years of incarceration. According to documentary reporting, his release was influenced in part by external advocacy connected to interest in his music career.

Following his release, White briefly pursued musical activity but did not achieve sustained commercial recording success. He subsequently withdrew from public life, and his later biography is inconsistently documented across available secondary sources.

== Legacy ==
Changin’ Times has been cited in retrospective journalism as a significant example of prison-recorded music and has been compared in tone and narrative structure to other rediscovered or rehabilitated musical works from the period.

The album has also been discussed in documentary film and cultural journalism exploring themes of incarceration, rehabilitation, and artistic expression within the U.S. prison system.

White remains a relatively obscure figure in mainstream histories of funk and soul music, but his work has experienced renewed attention through archival reissues and documentary storytelling.

== Discography ==
=== Studio albums ===
- Changin’ Times (1976)
