= Solid state =

Solid state, or solid matter, is one of the four fundamental states of matter.

Solid state may also refer to:

== Electronics ==
- Solid-state electronics, using semiconductors
- Solid state ionics
- Solid-state drive, a data storage device

== Music ==
- Solid State Records, a Christian music label
- Solid State Records (jazz label), active in the 1960s
- Solid State, a musical trio with DJ Dextrous
- Solid State (Leon Russell album), 1984
- Solid State (Jonathan Coulton album), 2017
- Solid State, an album by Sam Phillips

== Science ==
- Solid-state chemistry, the chemistry of solids
- Solid-state physics, the study of how atomic-scale properties lead to large-scale properties
