= Solid (Mandrill album) =

Studio album by Mandrill
- Released: 1975
- Recorded: 1975
- Studio: Studio in the Country, Washington Parish, Louisiana; Strings recorded at The Record Plant, New York City
- Genre: Soul, funk
- Label: United Artists
- Producer: Carlos Wilson; Louis Wilson; Ric Wilson; Claude "Coffee" Cave

Mandrill chronology
Mandrilland (1974)	Solid (1975)	Beast from the East (1976)

Solid is the sixth album by the Brooklyn-based soul/funk band Mandrill. Released in 1975, it was their first album on United Artists Records.

== Track listing ==
All songs written and arranged by Mandrill

1. "Yucca Jump" 3:33
2. "Peck Yer Neck" 3:41
3. "Wind on Horseback" 6:16
4. "Tee Vee" 4:58
5. "Solid" 7:49
6. "Stop & Go" 3:24
7. "Silk" 6:32

== Personnel ==
- Carlos Wilson - flute, trombone, guitar, timbales, bass, congas, percussion, vocals, kazoo
- Louis Wilson - trumpet, congas, drums, percussion, vocals, kazoo
- Ric Wilson - saxophone, percussion, vocals, kazoo
- Claude "Coffee" Cave - organ, vibraphone, piano, synthesizer, Fender Rhodes, clavinet, percussion, bass, vocals, kazoo
- Tommy Trujillo - guitar, vocals
- Andre Locke - drums, vocals
- Brian Allsop - bass, vocals

== Charts ==
Chart (1975)	Peak position
Billboard Pop Albums	92
Billboard Top Soul Albums	18
