= Composite Truth =

Studio album by Mandrill
- Released: January 1973
- Recorded: Winter 1972
- Studio: Electric Lady Studios and The Hit Factory, New York City
- Genre: Soul, funk
- Length: 40:56
- Label: Polydor
- Producer: Mandrill; Alfred V. Brown

Mandrill chronology
Mandrill Is (1972)	Composite Truth (1973)	Just Outside of Town (1973)

Professional ratings
Review scores
Source	Rating
AllMusic	4.5/5 stars

Composite Truth is the third album by the Brooklyn-based soul/funk band Mandrill. Released in January 1973 on Polydor Records, the album reached No. 8 on the Billboard Top Soul Albums chart.

In 2000, this album, along with Mandrill, Mandrill Is, and Just Outside of Town, was re-released in a four-CD box set entitled The Ultimate Collection.

== Track listing ==
All songs written and arranged by Mandrill

1. "Hang Loose" 4:45
2. "Fencewalk" 5:28
3. "Hágalo" 2:47
4. "Don't Mess With People" 3:45
5. "Polk Street Carnival" 6:03
6. "Golden Stone" 7:17
7. "Out With The Boys" 5:09
8. "Moroccan Nights" 5:42

== Personnel ==
- Carlos Wilson - trombone, alto saxophone, flute, guitar, vocals
- Louis Wilson - trumpet, flugelhorn, percussion, vocals
- Ricardo Wilson - tenor saxophone, percussion, vocals
- Claude "Coffee" Cave - keyboards, vibraphone, percussion, vocals
- Frederick "Fudgie Kae" Solomon - bass, percussion, vocals
- Omar Mesa - guitar, percussion, vocals
- Neftali Santiago - drums, percussion, vocals

== Charts ==
Chart (1973)	Peak position
Billboard Pop Albums	28
Billboard Top Soul Albums	8

=== Singles ===
Year	Single	Chart positions	
Year	Single	US Pop	US Soul
1973	"Fencewalk"	52	19
1973	"Hang Loose"	83	25
