= Mandrilland =

Studio album by Mandrill
- Released: August 1974
- Recorded: 1974
- Studios: Studio in the Country, Washington Parish, Louisiana
- Genre: Funk
- Label: Polydor
- Producers: Mandrill, Alfred V. Brown

Mandrill chronology
Just Outside of Town (1973)	Mandrilland (1974)	Solid (1975)

Professional ratings
Review scores
Source	Rating
AllMusic	3/5 stars

Mandrilland is the fifth album by the Brooklyn-based soul/funk band Mandrill. Released in August 1974 as a double album, Mandrilland was the band's last album on Polydor.

== Background and recording ==
Mandrilland was recorded at Studio in the Country in Bogalusa, Louisiana, where Mandrill spent a month recording the album.

Guitarist Doug Rodrigues, who had previously played with Santana, joined Mandrill as the replacement for Omar Mesa.

== Critical reception ==
William V. Francis of The Kansas City Star called Mandrilland "first-class black rock" and compared Mandrill's mixture of rock, soul and jazz to War. Rodrigues played lead guitar on "Positive Thing" and "The Road to Love"; Francis called his playing on "The Road to Love" "torrid."

Paul Lentz of The Times-Picayune praised the musicianship and the sound of the album, including the work done at Studio in the Country.

== Track listing ==
All songs written and arranged by Mandrill

1. "Positive Thing" 3:25
2. "Positive Thing +" 5:15
3. "Skying Upward" 3:45
4. "The Road to Love" 5:15
5. "Armadillo" 1:48
6. "The Reason I Sing" 3:22
7. "Bro' Weevil & the Swallow" 4:48
8. "Khidja" 4:55
9. "House of Wood" 7:59
10. "'Drill in the Bush" 3:55
11. "El Funko" 2:54
12. "Love Is Sunshine" 4:22
13. "Folks on a Hill" 6:22
14. "Mini-Suite for Duke" 6:26
15. "Cal-Ipso" 5:00
16. "After the Race" 7:02
17. "Lady Jane" 4:00

== Personnel ==
- Carlos Wilson – saxophone, vocals
- Lou Wilson – percussion, trumpet, vocals
- Ric Wilson – saxophone
- Claude Cave – keyboards, vocals
- Fudgie Kae – bass, percussion, vocals
- Douglas Rodrigues – guitar, percussion, vocals
- Neftali Santiago – drums, percussion, vocals

== Charts ==
Chart (1974)	Peak position
Billboard Top Soul Albums	28

=== Singles ===
Year	Single	Chart positions
Year	Single	US Soul
1974	"Positive Thing"	29
1974	"The Road to Love "	82
