= Mandrill (band) =

American soul/funk band from Brooklyn, New York

- Mandrill in 1973

Background information
- Also known as: The Wilson Brothers
- Origin: Brooklyn, New York City, U.S.
- Genres: Funk; rock; soul; R&B; jazz; world music (see musical style section)
- Years active: 1968–1982; 1992–present
- Labels: Polydor; United Artists; Arista; Montage
- Members: Carlos Wilson; Ric "Doc" Wilson; Wilfredo "Wolf" Wilson; Marc Rey; Stacy Lamont Sydnor; Derrick Murdock; Eli Brueggemann; Keith Barry
- Past members: Lou Wilson; Claude "Coffee" Cave II; Bundie Cenas; Omar Mesa; Charles Padro; Fudgie Kae Solomon; Neftali Santiago; Douglas Rodrigues; Arlan Aschierbaum; Gemi Taylor; Brian Allsop; Tommy Trujillo; Juaquin Jessup; Andre "Mouth Man" Locke; Eddie Summers; Rick Sherman (keyboards)
- Website: www.mandrillexperience.com mandrillmusic.com

Mandrill is an American soul and funk band from Brooklyn, New York, formed in 1968 by the Panamanian-born brothers Carlos, Lou, and Ric Wilson. AllMusic called them "[o]ne of funk's most progressive outfits... [with an] expansive, eclectic vision."

Mandrill was often regarded as one of the most experimental and progressive funk bands of the 1970s. The band's debut album was released by Polydor Records in 1971 and showcased their unique blend of styles. Mandrill Is was released the following year, with more prominent rock and psychedelic influences. 1973's Composite Truth was the band's most commercially successful release and contained their signature song, "Fencewalk".

Mandrill continued to release albums throughout the 1970s such as Just Outside of Town (1973), Mandrilland (1974), Solid (1975), Beast from the East (1976), We Are One (1977), and New Worlds (1978). The band also contributed to the soundtracks for the 1977 film The Greatest (starring boxer Muhammad Ali) and the 1979 film The Warriors. 1980 saw the release of Getting in the Mood, followed by Energize in 1982, after which the band broke up due to dwindling commercial returns. The band reunited in 1992 and has toured and released new music occasionally since then. A live album, recorded in 2002 at the Montreux Jazz Festival, was released in 2006. Louis Wilson died in 2013.

Mandrill's most recent album, Back in Town, was released in 2020. Although the band was not as commercially successful as some of their peers in the funk scene of the era, their music has been extensively sampled by numerous hip-hop and contemporary R&B artists.

== History ==
The Wilson brothers were born in Panama and grew up in the Bedford–Stuyvesant area of Brooklyn. With Carlos on trombone and vocals, Lou on trumpet and vocals, and Ric on saxophone and vocals, they formed the band, which they named after the mandrill species of primate, known for its colorful features and family-oriented social structure. The other original members included keyboardist Claude "Coffee" Cave, guitarist Omar Mesa, bassist Bundie Cenas, and drummer Charlie Padro.

They signed with Polydor Records and released their self-titled debut album in 1971. The album and its self-titled single "Mandrill" both reached the Billboard charts. Fudgie Kae Solomon replaced Cenas for their second album Mandrill Is, which also reached the Billboard soul and pop charts.

Neftali Santiago then became Mandrill's new drummer. Their third album Composite Truth was released in 1973 and became their most successful release, with the single "Fencewalk" reaching number 19 on the Billboard soul singles chart. Guitarist Dougie Rodrigues, a former Santana sideman, joined in time for the fifth Mandrill album, Mandrilland, which earned the band another entry on the Billboard R&B Albums chart. In 1975, all members of the group other than the Wilson brothers and Cave departed, and Mandrill switched to United Artists. The albums Solid and Beast from the East were recorded with session musicians. The band then switched to Arista Records and added a fourth Wilson brother, Wilfredo, on bass. Former drummer Neftali Santiago returned and guitarist Joaquin Jessup joined. This lineup released the album We Are One in 1977 and scored their biggest hits in several years with the singles "Funky Monkey" and "Can You Get It". The band released three more albums for Arista, with diminishing success, and stopped recording as a group in 1982.

Lou Wilson died at age 71 in 2013. In 2019, Mandrill announced a new album titled Back in Town. The album was released in October 2020. The lineup included Carlos, Ric, and Wilfredo Wilson, plus Marc Rey (lead guitar), Stacy Lamont Sydnor (drums), Derrick Murdock (bass), Eli Brueggeman (keyboards), and Keith Barry (viola, saxophone, flute).

Mandrill's songs have been sampled by many acts, such as Johnny D, Public Enemy, EPMD, Ice Cube, Beck, DJ Shadow, Shawty Lo, Big L, Kanye West, Brandy, Jin, Eminem, The Avalanches, Kindred the Family Soul, and 9th Wonder.

== Musical style ==
Although primarily a funk band, Mandrill is known for their eclectic style, blending soul, jazz, Latin music, and rock. The band has been described as soul-rock, Latin funk, progressive funk, and R&B. Andy Kellman of AllMusic describes the band's sound as "a jam-heavy form of funk liberally infused with Latin, Caribbean, and jazz influences, plus gospel, blues, psychedelia, African music, and straight-up rock." Mark Marymont, in the liner notes to the 2000 box set The Ultimate Collection, described the band's style as "a tasty blend of soul, blues, rock, Afro-Latin elements and jazz". This cultural mash-up of sounds makes the band pioneers of world music.

The band's prominent use of Latin elements drew comparisons to Santana and War. Funk historian Rickey Vincent noted Mandrill's multi-ethnic membership and "bizarre blend of African-based rhythms, scorching rock riffs, country fonk, bop jazz, and one-chord guitar rock operas." Beyond blending various influences into their style, Mandrill's musical architecture was defined by a willingness to experiment with complex, shifting time signatures and expansive, suite-like structures that mirrored the progressive rock and jazz fusion movements of the era.

== Discography ==
=== Studio albums ===
- Mandrill (1971)
- Mandrill Is (1972)
- Composite Truth (1973)
- Just Outside of Town (1973)
- Mandrilland (1974)
- Solid (1975)
- Beast from the East (1976)
- The Greatest (with George Benson) (soundtrack, 1977)
- We Are One (1977)
- New Worlds (1978)
- Getting in the Mood (1980)
- Energize (1982)
- Rebirth (1992)
- D.W.B.B. (2000)
- Back in Town (2020)

=== Compilations ===
- The Best of Mandrill (1975)
- Fencewalk: The Anthology (1997)
- The Ultimate Collection (2000)
- Sunshine (2004)

=== Singles and EPs ===
- "Mandrill" (single, 1971)
- "Hang Loose" (single, 1973)
- "Living It Up" (single, 1975)
- "Peace and Love" (EP, 2001)
- "Driving While Black and Brown" (single, 2001)
- "Pre-Nuclear War Blues" (single, 2004)
- "Sunshine" (soundtrack contribution, 2004)
- "Summer in the City" (single, 2018)
- "Ape's Back in Town (The Reflex Funky Monkey Dub)" (single, 2020)

=== Live albums ===
- Live at Montreux (2006)
