= Mandrill Is =

Studio album by Mandrill
- Released: April 1972
- Recorded: 1971–1972
- Genre: Soul; funk; pop; rock; psychedelia; jazz
- Length: 43:14
- Label: Polydor
- Producer: Mandrill; Alfred V. Brown

Mandrill chronology
Mandrill (1970)	Mandrill Is (1972)	Composite Truth (1973)

Professional ratings
Review scores
Source	Rating
AllMusic	4/5 stars

Mandrill Is is the second album by the Brooklyn-based soul/funk band Mandrill. Released in April 1972 on Polydor Records, the album reached No. 24 on the Top Soul Albums chart. The album showcases the band's eclectic style, which fuses funk and soul with Latin elements, psychedelic rock, jazz and progressive pop.

In 2000, this album, along with Mandrill, Composite Truth, and Just Outside of Town, was re-released in a four-CD box set entitled The Ultimate Collection.

== Track listing ==
All songs written and arranged by Mandrill

1. "Ape Is High" 5:32
2. "Cohello" 1:50
3. "Git It All" 4:30
4. "Children of the Sun" 5:00
5. "I Refuse To Smile" 4:05
6. "Universal Rhythms" 3:24
7. "Lord of the Golden Baboon" 3:33
8. "Central Park" 4:05
9. "Kofijahm" 3:25
10. "Here Today Gone Tomorrow" 4:30
11. "The Sun Must Go Down" 3:17

== Personnel ==
- Carlos Wilson - trombone, alto saxophone, flute, guitar, percussion, vocals
- Louis Wilson - percussion, trumpet, flugelhorn, vocals
- Ricardo Wilson - tenor saxophone, percussion, vocals
- Claude "Coffee" Cave - keyboards, vibraphone, percussion, vocals
- Frederick "Fudgie Kae" Solomon - bass, percussion, vocals
- Omar Mesa - guitar, percussion, vocals
- Charles Padro - drums, percussion, vocals

== Charts ==
Chart (1972)	Peak position
Billboard Pop Albums	56
Billboard Top Soul Albums	24

=== Singles ===
Year	Single	Chart positions
Year	Single	US Soul
1972	"Git It All "	37
