= Just Outside of Town =

Studio album by Mandrill
- Released: October 1973
- Recorded: 1973
- Studio: Electric Lady, The Hit Factory and Sound Ideas in New York City; Sound City, Van Nuys, Los Angeles
- Genre: Soul, funk
- Length: 38:46
- Label: Polydor
- Producer: Mandrill, Alfred V. Brown

Mandrill chronology
Composite Truth (1973)	Just Outside of Town (1973)	Mandrilland (1974)

Professional ratings
Review scores
Source	Rating
AllMusic	3/5 stars

Just Outside of Town is the fourth album by the Brooklyn-based soul/funk band Mandrill. Released in October 1973 on Polydor Records, the album reached No. 8 on the Billboard Top Soul Albums chart.

In 2000, this album, along with Mandrill, Mandrill Is, and Composite Truth, was re-released in a four-CD box set entitled The Ultimate Collection.

== Track listing ==
All songs written and arranged by Mandrill

Side 1

1. "Mango Meat" 4:44
2. "Never Die" 3:22
3. "Love Song" 5:42
4. "Interlude" 0:24
5. "Fat City Strut" 3:19

Side 2

1. "Two Sisters of Mystery" 3:39
2. "Afrikus Retrospectus" 7:42
3. "She Ain't Lookin' Too Tough" 5:01
4. "Aspiration Flame" 5:00

== Personnel ==
- Carlos D. Wilson – trombone, flute, alto saxophone, timbales, percussion, guitar, vocals
- Louis Wilson – trumpet, congas, percussion, vocals
- Ricardo Wilson – tenor saxophone, percussion, vocals
- Claude "Coffee" Cave – organ, vibes, piano, synthesizer, percussion, clavinet, vocals
- Frederick "Fudgie Kae" Solomon – bass, acoustic guitar, percussion, vocals, piano
- Omar Mesa – lead guitar, percussion, vocals
- Neftali Santiago – drums, percussion, vocals

== Charts ==
Chart (1973)	Peak position
Billboard Pop Albums	82
Billboard Top Soul Albums	6

=== Singles ===
Year	Single	Chart positions
Year	Single	US Soul
1974	"Love Song"	65
1974	"Mango Meat"	40

== Samples and Covers ==
- Jungle Brothers sampled "Mango Meat" on their song "Straight Out the Jungle", from Straight out the Jungle, in 1988.
- Public Enemy sampled "Two Sisters of Mystery" on their song "By the Time I Get to Arizona", from Apocalypse 91... The Enemy Strikes Black, in 1991.
- The Avalanches sampled "Fat City Strut" on their song "Radio", from Since I Left You, in 2000.
