= Carol Hunter =

American singer-songwriter

Carol Hunter (April 19, 1946 – July 26, 2018) was an American guitarist and vocalist notable for her work with Neil Diamond, Bob Dylan, Richie Havens, Janis Ian and others. Hunter was also one of the first prominent female instrumentalists in rock music.

== Biography and musical history ==
Hunter was a self-taught guitarist who began learning the instrument in her teens after receiving her first guitar at age 13. She shortly added 12-string and bass guitar, eventually being admitted to the Juilliard School in New York City. Hunter was a teenager playing in New York clubs, allowing her the opportunity to make music with numerous musicians including Jimi Hendrix at The Scene club. Her first recordings were with the folk singer/guitarist Richie Havens. She also worked as an arranger with singer Janis Ian. Hunter was recorded as part of the Music From Free Creek supersession album in 1969, appearing with Keith Emerson, Buzz Feiten and others.

After leaving Juilliard, Hunter moved to Los Angeles and became a session guitarist before being hired by Neil Diamond as the lead guitarist for his live band from 1969 to 1971. Hunter's guitar and vocals were included on the Diamond record Gold, recorded live in Los Angeles in 1970, and she contributed guitar and vocals to several subsequent studio recordings by Diamond in the 1970s.

In 1971, Hunter chose to leave Diamond's band to pursue other projects and a solo recording, releasing The Next Voice You Hear on Purple Records in 1973. Hunter returned to her role as a studio guitarist and singer, including recording with Bob Dylan on the soundtrack for the movie Pat Garrett & Billy The Kid. Hunter reportedly turned down an offer from Dylan to be the lead guitarist for his Rolling Thunder Revue, a role eventually filled by Mick Ronson.

Hunter is also the mother of model/actress/dancer/choreographer Dusty Paik. Paik announced the death of her mother on Facebook as a result of pneumonia and multiple sclerosis on July 26, 2018.
