= Mandrill (album) =

Studio album by Mandrill
- Released: April 1971
- Recorded: Winter 1970
- Studio: Electric Lady Studios, New York City, New York
- Genre: Soul; funk; jazz-rock; Latin rock
- Length: 39:03
- Label: Polydor
- Producer: Mandrill; Beau Ray Fleming

Mandrill chronology
Mandrill (1971)	Mandrill Is (1972)

Professional ratings
Review scores
Source	Rating
AllMusic	3/5 stars

Mandrill is the debut album by the Brooklyn, New York-based band Mandrill, released in April 1971. The album peaked at number twenty-seven on the Billboard R&B albums chart.

In 2000, this album, along with Mandrill Is, Composite Truth, and Just Outside of Town, was re-released in a four-CD box set entitled The Ultimate Collection.

== Track listing ==
1. "Mandrill" - 4:20
2. "Warning Blues" - 4:33
3. "Symphonic Revolution" - 5:22
4. "Rollin' On" - 7:41
5. "Peace and Love (Amani Na Mapenzi) Movement I (Birth)" - 1:50
6. "Peace and Love (Amani Na Mapenzi) Movement II (Now)" - 1:45
7. "Peace and Love (Amani Na Mapenzi) Movement III (Time)" - 2:15
8. "Peace and Love (Amani Na Mapenzi) Movement IV (Encounter)" - 6:05
9. "Peace and Love (Amani Na Mapenzi) Movement V (Beginning)" - 2:05
10. "Chutney" - 3:07

== Personnel ==
- Carlos Wilson - flute, trombone, guitar, vocals
- Louis Wilson - percussion, trumpet, flugelhorn, vocals
- Ricardo Wilson - saxophone, percussion, vocals
- Claude Cave - keyboards, vibraphone, percussion, vocals
- Bundy Cenac - bass, percussion, vocals
- Omar Mesa - guitar, percussion, vocals
- Charles Padro - drums, percussion, vocals

== Charts ==
Chart (1971)	Peak position
Billboard Pop Albums	48
Billboard Top Soul Albums	27

=== Singles ===
Year	Single	Chart positions
Year	Single	US Pop
1971	"Mandrill"	94
