= Betty Davis =

American singer, songwriter, and model (1944–2022)

Background information
- Born: Betty Gray Mabry; July 26, 1944; Durham, North Carolina, U.S.
- Origin: New York City, NY, U.S.
- Died: February 9, 2022 (aged 77) Homestead, Pennsylvania, U.S.
- Genres: Funk; rock; R&B; soul
- Occupations: Singer; songwriter; model
- Instrument: Vocals
- Years active: 1964–1979; 2019
- Labels: Columbia; Just Sunshine; Island; Light in the Attic
- Formerly of: Miles Davis; The Chambers Brothers
- Spouse: Miles Davis (m. 1968; div. 1969)

Betty Davis (born Betty Gray Mabry; July 26, 1944 – February 9, 2022) was an American singer, songwriter, and model. She was known for her controversial sexually oriented lyrics and performance style, and was the second wife of trumpeter Miles Davis. Her AllMusic profile describes her as "a wildly flamboyant funk diva with few equals ... [who] combined the gritty emotional realism of Tina Turner, the futurist fashion sense of David Bowie, and the trendsetting flair of Miles Davis".

== Early life ==
Betty Gray Mabry was born in Durham, North Carolina, on July 26, 1944. She developed an interest in music when she was about ten, and was introduced to various blues musicians by her grandmother, Beulah Blackwell, while staying at her farm in Reidsville, North Carolina. At 12, she wrote one of her first songs, "I'm Going to Bake That Cake of Love". The family relocated to Homestead, Pennsylvania, so her father, Henry Mabry, could work at a Pennsylvania steel mill. Davis attended and graduated from Homestead High School.

== Career ==
When she was 16, Betty left Homestead for New York City, enrolling at the Fashion Institute of Technology (FIT) while living with her aunt. She soaked up the Greenwich Village culture and folk music of the early 1960s. She associated herself with frequenters of the Cellar, a hip uptown club where young and stylish people congregated. It was a multiracial, artsy crowd of models, design students, actors, and singers. At the Cellar she played records and chatted people up. She was a friend and early muse to fashion designer Stephen Burrows, who also studied at the FIT at the time. She also worked as a model, appearing in photo spreads in Seventeen, Ebony and Glamour.

In New York, she met musicians including Jimi Hendrix and Sly Stone. The seeds of her musical career were planted through her friendship with soul singer Lou Courtney, who reputedly produced her first single, "The Cellar", though the existence of that record has been questioned. She secured a contract with Don Costa, who had written arrangements for Frank Sinatra. As Betty Mabry, she recorded "Get Ready For Betty" b/w "I'm Gonna Get My Baby Back" in 1964 for Costa's DCP International label. Around the same time, she recorded a single, "I'll Be There", with Roy Arlington for Safice Records, under the joint name "Roy and Betty".

Her first professional gig came after she wrote "Uptown (to Harlem)" for The Chambers Brothers. Their 1967 album was a major success, but Mabry focused on her modeling career. She was successful as a model but felt bored by the work—"I didn't like modeling because you didn't need brains to do it. It's only going to last as long as you look good."

In 1968, when she was in a relationship with Hugh Masekela, she recorded several songs for Columbia Records, with Masekela doing the arrangements. Two of them were released as a single: "Live, Love, Learn" b/w "It's My Life". Her relationship with Miles Davis began soon after her breakup from Masekela. She featured on the cover of Miles Davis's 1968 album Filles de Kilimanjaro, which included his tribute to her, "Mademoiselle Mabry", and she introduced him to psychedelic rock and the flamboyant clothing styles of the era. In the spring of 1969, Betty returned to Columbia's 52nd St. Studios to record a series of demo tracks, with Miles and Teo Macero producing. At least five songs were taped during those sessions, three of which were Mabry originals, two of which were covers of Cream and Creedence Clearwater Revival. Miles attempted to use these demo songs to secure an album deal for Betty, but neither Columbia nor Atlantic were interested and they were archived until 2016, when they were released in the compilation The Columbia Years, 1968–1969 by Seattle's Light in the Attic Records.

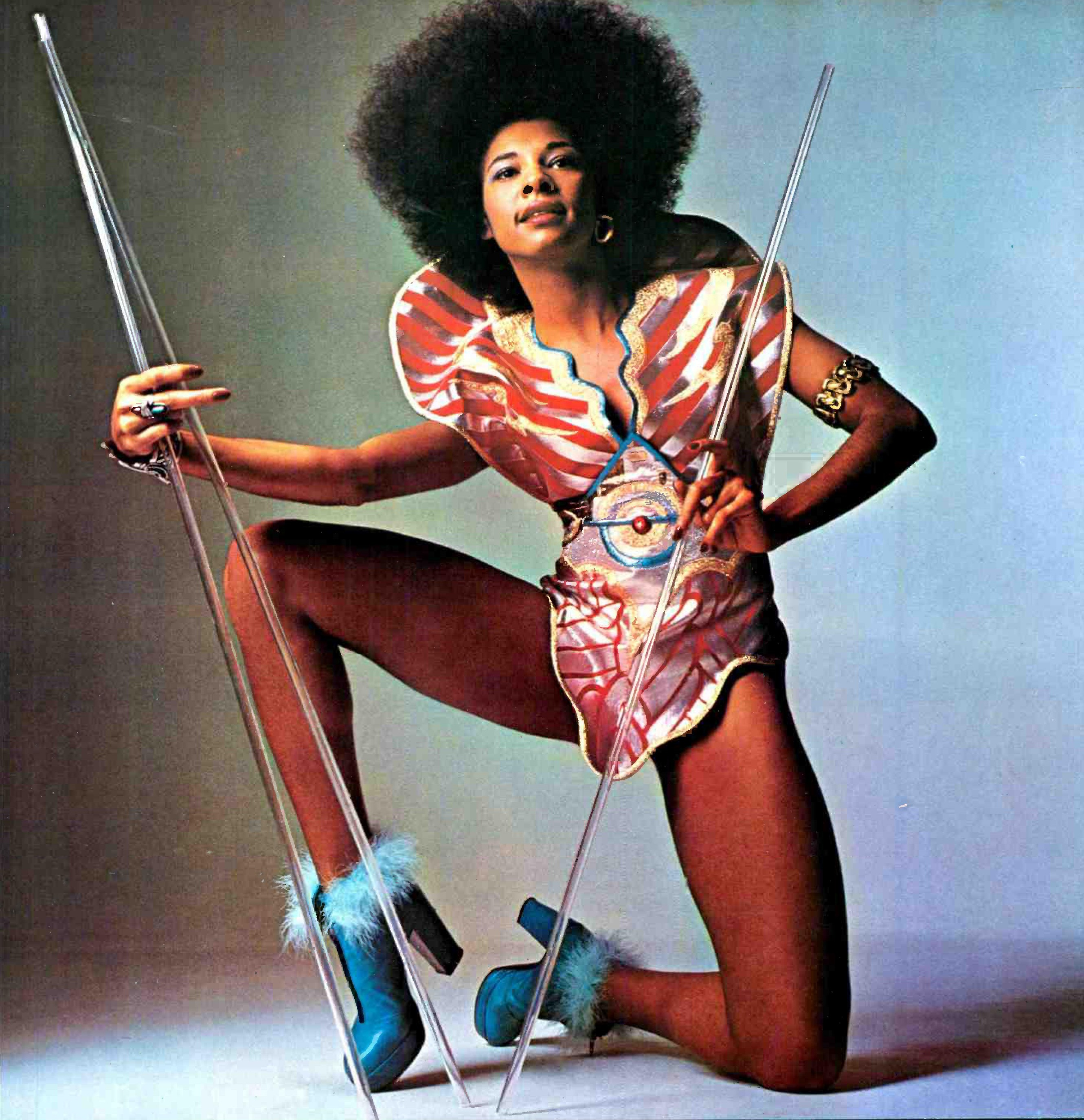
Betty Davis as depicted in a 1974 advertisement for her album They Say I'm Different in Billboard

After the end of her marriage with Miles, Betty moved to London, probably around 1971, to pursue her modeling career. She wrote music while in the UK and, after about a year, returned to the US with the intention of recording songs with Santana. Instead, she recorded her own songs with a group of West Coast funk musicians including Larry Graham, Greg Errico, the Pointer Sisters, and members of Tower of Power. Davis wrote and arranged all her songs. Her first record, Betty Davis, was released in 1973. She released two more studio albums, They Say I'm Different (1974) and her major label debut on Island Records Nasty Gal (1975). None of the three albums were a commercial success, but she had two minor hits on the Billboard R&B chart: "If I'm in Luck I Might Get Picked Up", which reached number 66 in 1973, and "Shut Off the Lights", which reached number 97 in 1975.

Davis remained a cult figure as a singer, due in part to her unabashedly sexual lyrics and performance style, which were both controversial for the time. She had success in Europe, but in the U.S. she was barred from performing on television because of her sexually aggressive stage persona. Some of her shows were boycotted, and her songs were not played on the radio due to pressure by religious groups and the NAACP. Carlos Santana recalled Betty as "indomitable – she couldn't be tamed. Musically, philosophically and physically, she was extreme and attractive."

== Retirement ==
Davis completed another album for Island Records in 1976 (which was shelved and unreleased for 33 years), before being dropped by the label. She spent a year in Japan, spending time with silent monks.

Davis's father died in 1980, which prompted her return to the US to live with her mother in Homestead, Pennsylvania. Davis struggled to overcome her father's death, and subsequent mental illness. She acknowledged that she suffered a setback at the time, but stayed in Homestead, accepted the end of her career, and lived a quiet life.

The tracks from her final recording sessions in 1979 were released on two bootleg albums, Crashin' From Passion (1995) and Hangin' Out in Hollywood (1996). A greatest hits album, Anti Love: The Best of Betty Davis, was also released in 1995.

In 2007, Betty Davis (1973) and They Say I'm Different (1974) were reissued by Light in the Attic Records. In 2009, the label reissued Nasty Gal and her unreleased fourth studio album recorded in 1976, re-titled Is It Love or Desire? Both reissues contained extensive liner notes and shed some light on the mystery of why her fourth album, considered possibly to be her best work by members of her last band (Herbie Hancock, Chuck Rainey, and Alphonse Mouzon), was shelved and remained unreleased for 33 years.

An independent documentary directed by Phil Cox entitled Betty: They Say I'm Different was released in 2017, which renewed interest in her life and music career. When Cox tracked Davis down, he found her living in the basement of a house with no internet, cell phone, or car. He said: "This wasn't a woman with riches or luxury. She was living on the bare essentials."

In 2019, Davis released "A Little Bit Hot Tonight", her first new song in more than 40 years, which was performed and sung by Danielle Maggio, an ethnomusicologist who was a close friend and associate producer on Betty: They Say I'm Different.

To commemorate the 50th anniversary of Betty Davis's self-titled debut, in 2023 Light in the Attic Records reissued three of her albums: Betty Davis, They Say I'm Different, Is It Love Or Desire?, as well as the first official vinyl release of her 1979 tracks, Crashin' From Passion (the tracks had previously been released on CD).

== Personal life and death ==
As a model in 1966, Betty met jazz musician Miles Davis, who was 18 years her senior. He was separated from his first wife, dancer Frances Davis, and was dating actress Cicely Tyson. Betty began dating Miles in early 1968, and they were married that September. During their year of marriage, she introduced him to the fashions and popular music trends of the era that influenced his music. In his autobiography, Miles credited Betty with helping to plant the seeds of his further musical explorations by introducing the trumpeter to psychedelic rock guitarist Jimi Hendrix and funk innovator Sly Stone. The Miles Davis album Filles de Kilimanjaro (1968) features Betty on the cover and includes a song named after her.

In his autobiography, Miles said Betty was "too young and wild", and accused her of having an affair with Jimi Hendrix, which hastened the end of their marriage. Betty denied the affair, stating: "I was so angry with Miles when he wrote that. It was disrespectful to Jimi and to me. Miles and I broke up because of his violent temper." After accusing her of adultery, he filed for divorce in 1969. Miles told Jet magazine that the divorce was obtained on a "temperament" charge. He added: "I'm just not the kind of cat to be married." Hendrix and Miles remained close, planning to record, until Hendrix's death. The influence of Hendrix and especially Sly Stone on Miles Davis was obvious on the album Bitches Brew (1970), which ushered in the era of jazz fusion. It has been said that he wanted to call the album Witches Brew but Betty convinced him to change it.

Davis briefly dated musician Eric Clapton, but she refused to collaborate with him.

In 1975 Davis's lover Robert Palmer helped her secure a deal with Island Records. Shortly thereafter she released her album Nasty Gal.

Davis died from cancer at her home in Homestead, Pennsylvania, on February 9, 2022, at the age of 77.

== Legacy ==
The live action/animated TV series Mike Judge Presents: Tales from the Tour Bus ended its 2018 season with an episode focusing on Davis's controversial career.

Davis's music has been featured in television series including Orange Is the New Black, Girlboss, Mixed-ish, High Fidelity and Pistol.

Ethnomusicologist Danielle Maggio, who recorded vocals on Davis's "A Little Bit Hot Tonight" and authored liner notes for two of Davis' re-released albums, has written a book about Davis called Game Is Her Middle Name: The Unapologetic Life of Betty Davis. It is due to be published by Feminist Press in February 2027.

== Discography ==
=== Studio albums ===
List of studio albums, with selected chart positions
Title	Details	Peak chart positions			
Title	Details	US Bub.	US R&B	AUS	GER
Betty Davis	Released: 1973; Label: Just Sunshine; Formats: LP, CD, cassette, 8-track, digital download, streaming	202	54	—	—
They Say I'm Different	Released: 1974; Label: Just Sunshine; Formats: LP, CD, 8-track, digital download, streaming	—	46	—	41
Nasty Gal	Released: 1975; Label: Island; Formats: LP, CD, cassette, digital download, streaming	—	54	96	—
Crashin' from Passion (Note: Album was recorded in 1979.)	Released: 1995; Label: Light in the Attic; Formats: LP, CD, digital download, streaming	—	—	—	—
Is It Love or Desire (Note: Album was recorded in 1976.)	Released: October 6, 2009; Label: Light in the Attic; Formats: LP, CD, digital download, streaming	—	—	—	—
"—" denotes a recording that did not chart or was not released in that territory.

=== Compilation albums ===
List of compilation albums, with selected chart positions
Title	Details	Peak chart positions
Title	Details	US Heat.
Anti Love - The Best Of Betty Davis	Released: 1995; Label: Vinyl Experience Ltd.; Formats: LP, CD	-
This Is It!	Released: 2005; Label: Vampi Soul; Formats: 2xLP, CD	-
The Columbia Years 1968–1969	Released: June 28, 2016; Label: Light in the Attic; Formats: LP, CD, digital download, streaming	23

=== Singles ===
List of singles, with selected chart positions
Title	Year	Peak chart positions	Album
Title	Year	US R&B	Album
"Get Ready for Betty" (Note: Credited as Betty Mabry.)	1964	—	Non-album singles
"I'll Be There" (Note: Credited as Betty and Roy.)	1964	—	Non-album singles
"Live, Love, Learn"	1968	—	Non-album singles
"Steppin in Her I. Miller Shoes"	1973	—	Betty Davis
"If I'm in Luck I Might Get Picked Up"	1973	66	Betty Davis
"Ooh Yeah"	1973	—	Betty Davis
"Shoo-B-Doop and Cop Him"	1974	—	They Say I'm Different
"Git in There"	1974	—	They Say I'm Different
"They Say I'm Different" (Note: Released in Japan only.)	1974	—	They Say I'm Different
"Shut Off the Light"	1975	97	Nasty Gal
"Dedicated to the Press" (Note: Released in Italy only.)	1975	—	Nasty Gal
"Talkin' Trash"	1976	—	Nasty Gal
"—" denotes a recording that did not chart or was not released in that territory.

== Literature ==
- Liner notes to Light in the Attic Records' 2007 re-issue of Betty Davis's self-titled 1973 debut album.
