= Greg Errico =

American musician and producer

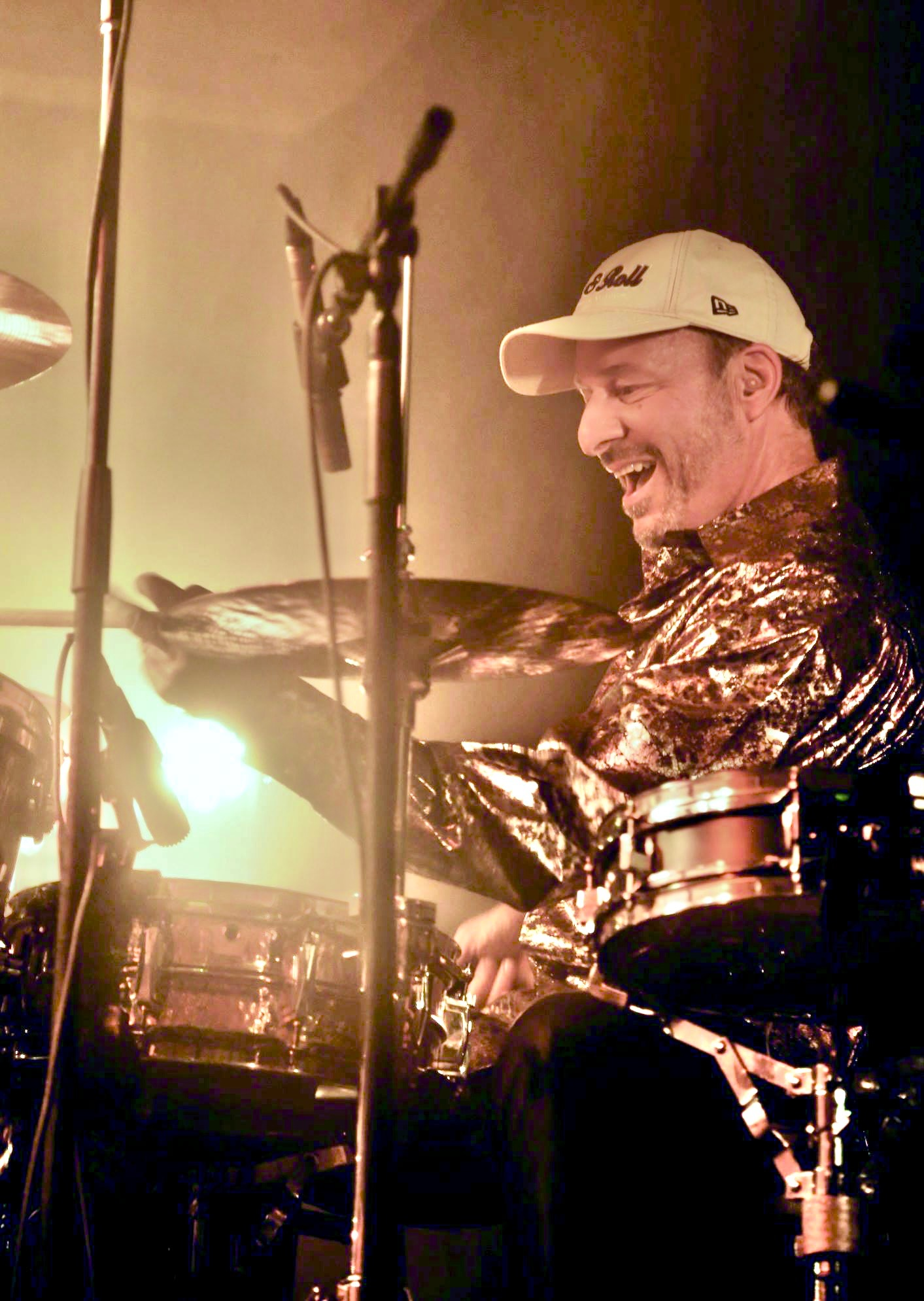
- Errico in 2015

Background information
- Born: September 1, 1948 (age 78); San Francisco, California, U.S.
- Genres: Psychedelic soul; funk; R&B; jazz fusion
- Occupations: Musician; producer
- Instruments: Drums; percussion
- Years active: 1965–present

Greg Errico (born September 1, 1948) is an American musician and record producer, best known as the drummer for the popular and influential psychedelic soul/funk band Sly and the Family Stone.

== Career ==
=== 1960s-1970s ===
He was a founding member and the original drummer, in December 1966, for Sly & The Family Stone, and in 1971 he became the first member to quit the group, citing the band's continuing turmoil. As a member of Sly and the Family Stone, Errico played at Woodstock music festival in 1969.

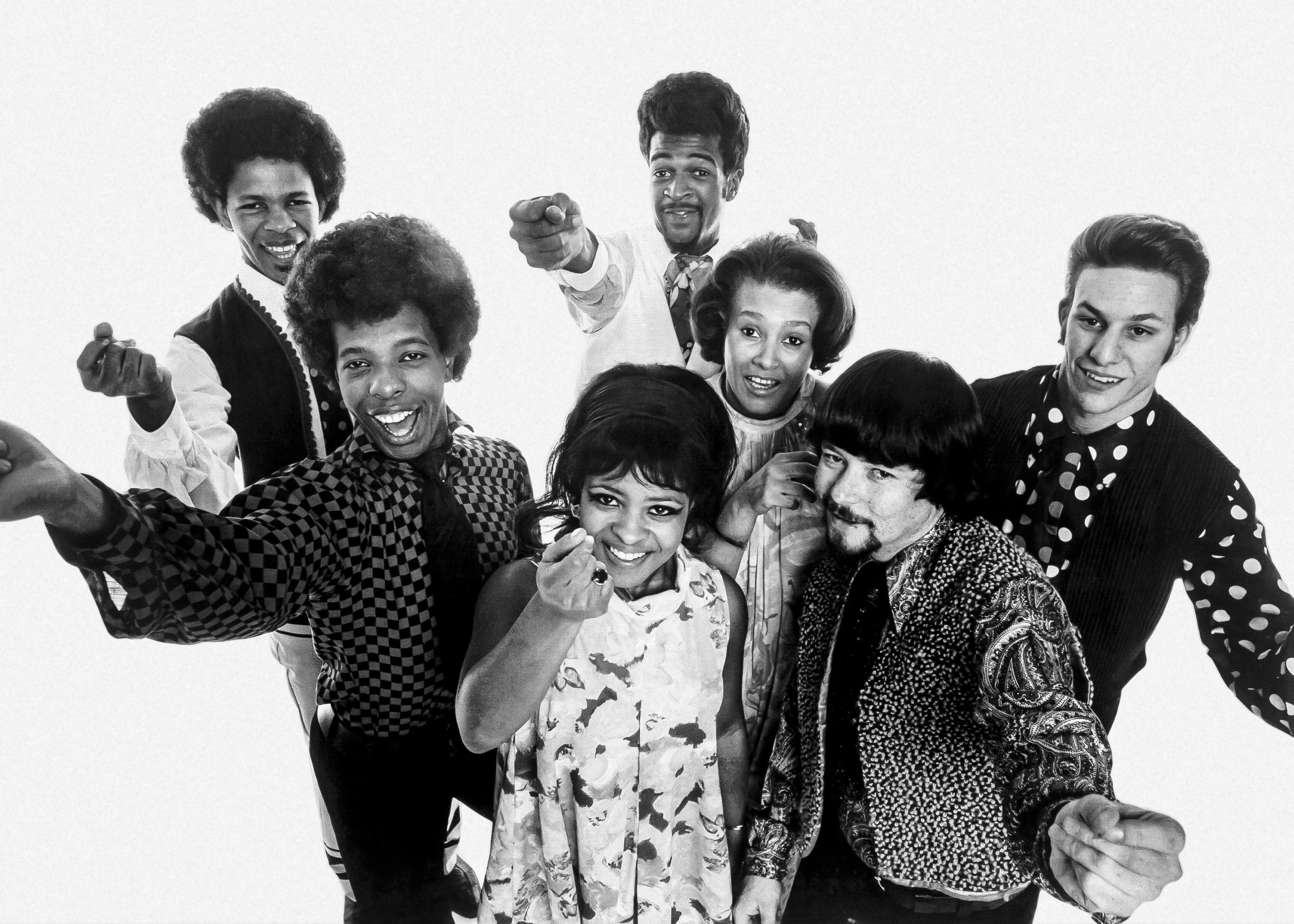
Sly and the Family Stone in 1968. Left to right: Freddie Stone, Sly Stone, Rose Stone, Larry Graham, Cynthia Robinson, Jerry Martini, and Greg Errico.

Errico toured with jazz-fusion group Weather Report in 1973/74, but never made a studio recording with the group. His performances can be heard on live recordings hosted at the website Wolfgang's Vault. Joe Zawinul said that no one could play his tune "Boogie Woogie Waltz" better than Errico had.

Errico joined the David Bowie band for his Diamond Dogs Tour during September 1974.

Errico later collaborated with bands such as Santana, on the Carlos Santana & Buddy Miles! Live! album, released June 7, 1972, and with the Grateful Dead. In 1974 he began drumming for the Jerry Garcia Band on and off through 1984. He also worked with Larry Graham (from Sly & The Family Stone) plus members of the Tower of Power horns, Journey and the Pointer Sisters on the first album for Betty Davis; Errico produced and drummed.

=== Some later works ===
During mid 80's - mid 90's Greg joined the reformed Quicksilver Messenger Service. Early 2000's, 2005 - 2008 produced a couple CD's for Jamie Davis, big band w/members of Count Basie Orchestra. Performed at the 2006 Grammy Awards, in the Sly & the Family Stone tribute, alongside most of his former bandmates. 2024 Greg was an executive producer on Grammy winning "Basie Swings The Blues", Best Large Jazz Ensemble album category. https://www.youtube.com/watch?v=pYLvOZX6kCw

== Legacy ==
He was inducted into the Rock and Roll Hall of Fame in 1993. He continued to tour, with The Family Stone, alongside fellow founding member of Sly and the Family Stone Jerry Martini (saxophone). This band also included former Sly and the Family Stone member Cynthia Robinson (trumpet) before she died in 2015.

Errico's intricate drumming, particularly with Sly & the Family Stone, has been sampled on a multitude of recordings by hip hop producers over the years.

Errico appears in two recent documentaries, "Summer of Soul" and "Sly Lives."

== Personal life ==
Errico was born and grew up in San Francisco, California. Errico relocated to Las Vegas in 2023, and continues to play and produce.

A 2014 scientific paper states that Errico is the musician with the highest degree and PageRank centralities, and the second highest Eigenvector centrality, of all musicians of all time.

== Equipment ==
Over his career, Errico has played a variety of drum sets, Ludwig and DW. He currently plays DW drums and Paiste cymbals.

== Discography ==
- A Whole New Thing – Sly and the Family Stone (1967)
- Dance to the Music – Sly and the Family Stone (1968)
- Life – Sly and the Family Stone (1968)
- Stand! – Sly and the Family Stone (1969)
- Woodstock – various artists, (as Sly and the Family Stone) (1970)
- There's a Riot Goin' On – Sly and the Family Stone (1971)
- Rolling Thunder – Mickey Hart (1972)
- Carlos Santana & Buddy Miles! Live! – Carlos Santana and Buddy Miles (1972)
- Betty Davis – Betty Davis (1973)
- Monkey Grip – Bill Wyman (1974)
- Band Wagon – Shigeru Suzuki (1975)
- Changing Times - Ike White (1975)
- David Soul – David Soul (1976)
- Lee Oskar – Lee Oskar (1976)
- Stone Alone – Bill Wyman (1976)
- Giants – Giants (1978)
- Before the Rain – Lee Oskar (1978)
- Say It with Silence – Hubert Laws (1978)
- My Road, Our Road – Lee Oskar (1980)
- The Apocalypse Now Sessions – Rhythm Devils (1980)
- Watchfire – Pete Sears (1988)
- Snakes & Stripes – Harvey Mandel (1995)
- Seven – Enuff Z'nuff (1997)
- Red Clay Harvest – Cravin' Melon (1998)
- The Closing of Winterland – Grateful Dead (2003)
- Garcia Live Volume Five – Jerry Garcia Band (2014)
- Cracked Actor (Live Los Angeles '74) – David Bowie (2017)
