= Buzzy Linhart =

American singer and actor (1943–2020)

- Born: William Charles Linhart; March 3, 1943; Pittsburgh, Pennsylvania, U.S.
- Died: February 13, 2020 (aged 76) Berkeley, California, U.S.
- Occupations: Musician, actor
- Website: buzzartinc.com

William Charles "Buzzy" Linhart (March 3, 1943 – February 13, 2020) was an American rock performer, composer, multi-instrumentalist musician and actor.

== Early life and education ==
Linhart was born in Pittsburgh, Pennsylvania, and raised in East Cleveland, Ohio. He had a sister, Abby Linhart, and a brother, Gair Linhart.

He began playing percussion at the age of seven and switched to vibraphone at ten. At fourteen, he entered the Cleveland Music School Settlement, where he continued his musical training and led bands while in school.

Before graduating from high school, Linhart joined the U.S. Navy to play and compose for a military band. He attended the U.S. Navy School of Music as a percussionist and served in the Navy for 18 months before receiving an honorable discharge. Linhart said that while helping fight a fire at a naval base in Washington, D.C., he suffered damage to his lungs.

== Career ==
In 1963, Linhart moved to New York City and became friends and roommates with John Sebastian. He also became a protégé of guitarist and folk singer Fred Neil. One of his first bands, with fellow musicians Steve De Naut, Serge Katzen and Max Ochs, was the Seventh Sons, who released a raga-rock LP for ESP Records.

Following the damage to his lungs during his Navy service, Linhart objected to tobacco smoke in the clubs where he performed. A frequent guest of radio host Vin Scelsa, he complained of feeling ill "singin' in the smoke." (source: The Closet, hosted by Vin Scelsa, WFMU 91.1FM, 1967–1969)

Linhart released a series of solo albums from the late 1960s to the mid-1970s, starting with his Philips debut buzzy (the title with a small "b") in 1969. Although closely associated with the Greenwich Village folk-rock scene for much of his career, he recorded that first complete solo album in London and Wales with the Welsh prog-rock band Eyes of Blue serving as the backing band.

In 1969, Linhart performed at The Bitter End in New York City as the Buzzy Linhart Quartet, with Doug Rodrigues on guitar, Doug Rauch on bass and John Siomos on drums. In 1970, the newly formed Eleuthera Records announced the Buzzy Linhart Group as one of its artists. The group was renamed Music and recorded its self-titled album in 1970; Music was released by Eleuthera in 1971.

The album was later reissued as part of the double album Buzzy Linhart Is Music, which included Music and Linhart's earlier album Buzzy. In a retrospective review for AllMusic, Joe Viglione wrote, "The tragedy here is that Music didn't get to put out more...music. There's definitely something special in the grooves of this important but not very visible recording."

== Illness and death ==
Linhart suffered a heart attack in May 2018. He died on February 13, 2020.

== Discography ==
- buzzy - (Philips Records, 1969)
- Music - (Eleuthera Records, 1970)
- Jake and the Family Jewels - (Polydor Records 244029, 1970)
- The Time to Live is Now - (Kama Sutra Records, 1971)
- Buzzy (The Black Album) - (Kama Sutra Records, 1972)
- Pussycats Can Go Far - (Atco Records, 1974)
- "Tornado" - (Accord Records, 1981)
- Four Sides of Buzzy Linhart - 4-song EP (Caromar Records, 1982)
- The Buzzy/Moogy Sessions: 1983-1994 - (Moogy Music, 2000)
- Buzzy Linhart Loves You: Classic Recordings - (Razor & Tie, 2001)
- Studio - (BuzzArt Inc., 2006)
- Electric Lady Dream - (BuzzArt Inc., 2012)
- Live Cafe Au Go Go (1971) - (BuzzArt Inc., 2013)
- Peace in the Country (unplugged) - (BuzzArt Inc., 2015)
