= Peter Frampton discography =

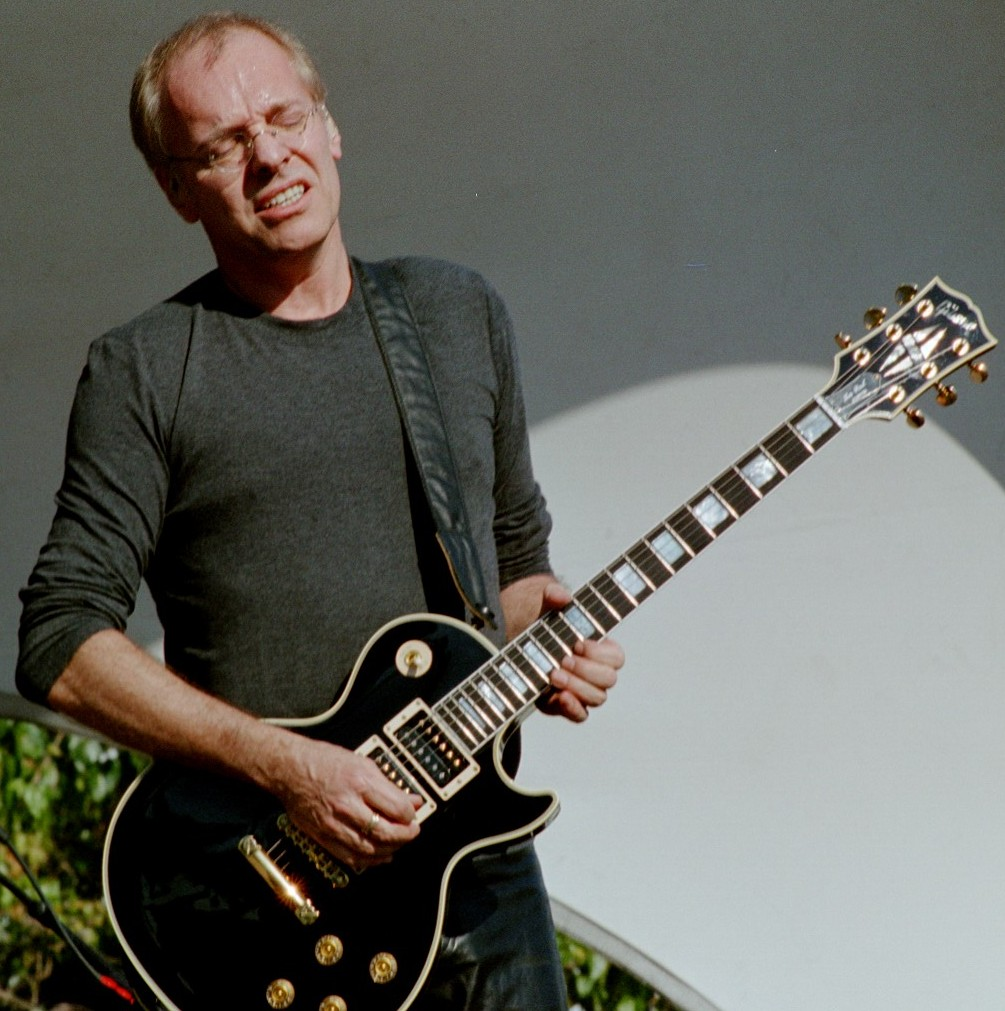
- Frampton performing in 2006
- Studio albums: 18
- Live albums: 4
- Compilation albums: 7
- Singles: 24
- Video albums: 4

The English musician and songwriter Peter Frampton has released 18 studio albums, four live albums, seven compilation albums, four videos, and 24 singles. This article chronologically catalogues all of Frampton's releases as a solo act.

Despite all of his releases, Frampton is best known for his multi-platinum 1976 live album, Frampton Comes Alive!, which is one of the best-selling live albums of all time.

== Discography ==
=== Studio albums ===
Year	Album details	Peak chart positions							Certifications
Year	Album details	UK	AUS	CAN	GER	NOR	SWE	US	Certifications
1972	Wind of Change: Released: May 1972; Label: A&M Records	—	—	—	—	—	—	177	
1973	Frampton's Camel: Released: May 1973; Label: A&M Records	—	—	—	—	—	—	110	
1974	Somethin's Happening: Released: March 1974; Label: A&M Records	—	—	—	—	—	—	125	
1975	Frampton: Released: March 1975; Label: A&M Records	—	—	—	—	—	—	32	RIAA: Gold
1977	I'm in You: Released: 3 June 1977; Label: A&M Records	19	4	1	37	21	33	2	ARIA: Platinum; BPI: Silver; MC: Platinum; RIAA: Platinum
1979	Where I Should Be: Released: 30 May 1979; Label: A&M Records	—	35	28	—	—	—	19	MC: Gold; RIAA: Gold
1981	Breaking All the Rules: Released: 14 May 1981; Label: A&M Records	—	89	42	—	—	—	43	
1982	The Art of Control: Released: 3 August 1982; Label: A&M Records	—	—	—	—	—	—	174	
1986	Premonition: Released: 27 January 1986; Label: Virgin Records	—	—	—	—	—	—	80	
1989	When All the Pieces Fit: Released: October 1989; Label: Atlantic Records	—	—	—	—	—	—	152	
1994	Peter Frampton: Released: 25 January 1994; Label: Sony International	—	—	—	89	—	—	—	
2003	Now: Released: 26 August 2003; Label: 33rd Street Records	—	—	—	—	—	—	—	
2006	Fingerprints: Released: 12 September 2006; Label: A&M Records	—	—	—	—	—	—	129	
2010	Thank You Mr. Churchill: Released: 27 April 2010; Label: New Door Records	—	—	—	—	—	—	154	
2014	Hummingbird in a Box: Songs for a Ballet: Released: 27 July 2014; Label: RED Distribution	—	—	—	—	—	—	—	
2016	Acoustic Classics: Released: 26 February 2016; Label: Phenix Phonograph	—	—	—	—	—	—	—	
2019	All Blues: Released: 7 June 2019; Label: UMe	—	—	—	—	—	—	183	
2021	Frampton Forgets the Words: Released: 23 April 2021; Label: UMe	—	—	—	—	—	—	—	

=== Live albums ===
Year	Album details	Peak chart positions					Certifications
Year	Album details	UK	AUS	CAN	GER	US	Certifications
1976	Frampton Comes Alive!: Released: 15 January 1976; Label: A&M Records	6	8	1	4	1	ARIA: 3× Platinum; BPI: Gold; MC: Gold; RIAA: 8× Platinum
1995	Frampton Comes Alive! II: Released: 10 October 1995; Label: IRS Records	121	—	—	—	—	
2000	Live in Detroit: Released: 16 May 2000; Label: CMC International	—	—	—	—	—	
2004	Live in San Francisco, March 24, 1975: Released: 2004; Label: A&M/Hip-O Select Records	—	—	—	—	—	
2012	Best Of FCA!35 Tour: An Evening With Peter Frampton: Released: 2012; Label: Eagle Records	—	—	—	—	—	

=== Compilation albums ===
Year	Album details
1987	Classics Volume 12: Released: 1987; Label: A&M Records
1992	Shine On – A Collection: Released: 19 October 1992; Label: A&M Records
1996	Greatest Hits: Released: 18 June 1996; Label: A&M Records
1998	Peter Frampton Shows the Way: Released: 1998 (UK & Europe only); Label: Spectrum Music
1998	The Very Best of Peter Frampton: Released: 4 August 1998; Label: A&M Records
2001	Anthology: The History of Peter Frampton: Released: 24 July 2001; Label: A&M Records
2003	20th Century Masters: The Millennium Collection. The Best of Peter Frampton: Released: 15 July 2003; Label: A&M Records
2005	Gold: Released: 26 April 2005; Label: A&M Records

=== Singles ===
Year	Title	Peak chart positions						Certifications	Album
Year	Title	US	US Main	US AC	AUS	CAN	UK	Certifications	Album
1972	"Jumpin' Jack Flash"	—	—	—	—	—	—		Wind of Change
1972	"It's a Plain Shame"	—	—	—	—	—	—		Wind of Change
1973	"All Night Long"	—	—	—	—	—	—		Frampton's Camel
1973	"Which Way the Wind Blows"	—	—	—	—	—	—		Frampton's Camel
1974	"Baby (Somethin's Happening)"	—	—	—	—	—	—		Somethin's Happening
1974	"Doobie Wah"	—	—	—	—	—	—		Somethin's Happening
1975	"Show Me the Way"	—	—	—	—	—	—		Frampton
1975	"Baby, I Love Your Way"	—	—	—	—	—	—	BPI: Platinum	Frampton
1975	"(I'll Give You) Money"	—	—	—	—	—	—		Frampton
1976	"Show Me the Way" (live)	6	—	—	25	2	10	RIAA: Gold	Frampton Comes Alive!
1976	"Baby, I Love Your Way" (live)	12	—	28	65	3	43	RIAA: Platinum	Frampton Comes Alive!
1976	"Do You Feel Like We Do" (live)	10	—	—	—	7	39		Frampton Comes Alive!
1977	"I'm in You"	2	—	26	9	1	41	MC: Gold	I'm in You
1977	"Signed, Sealed, Delivered (I'm Yours)"	18	—	—	—	13	—		I'm in You
1977	"Tried to Love"	41	—	—	—	41	—		I'm in You
1978	"The Long and Winding Road"	—	—	—	—	—	—		Sgt. Pepper's Lonely Hearts Club Band (soundtrack)
1978	"Sgt. Pepper's Lonely Hearts Club Band/With a Little Help From My Friends" (with the Bee Gees & Paul Nicholas)	—	—	—	—	—	—		Sgt. Pepper's Lonely Hearts Club Band (soundtrack)
1979	"I Can't Stand It No More"	14	—	—	86	15	—		Where I Should Be
1979	"She Don't Reply"	—	—	—	—	—	—		Where I Should Be
1979	"It's a Sad Affair"	—	—	—	—	—	—		Where I Should Be
1980	"Rise Up"	—	—	—	—	—	—		Breaking All the Rules
1981	"Breaking All the Rules"	—	12	—	—	—	—		Breaking All the Rules
1981	"Friday on My Mind"	—	—	—	—	—	—		Breaking All the Rules
1981	"I Don't Wanna Let You Go"	—	—	—	—	—	—		Breaking All the Rules
1981	"You Kill Me"	—	—	—	—	—	—		Breaking All the Rules
1981	"Dig What I Say"	—	—	—	—	—	—		Breaking All the Rules
1982	"Sleepwalk"	—	—	—	—	—	—		The Art of Control
1982	"Back to Eden"	—	—	—	—	—	—		The Art of Control
1985	"Lying"	74	4	—	—	—	100		Premonition
1985	"Hiding from a Heartache"	—	—	—	—	—	—		Premonition
1986	"All Eyes on You"	—	—	—	—	—	—		Premonition
1989	"Holding on to You"	—	27	—	—	66	—		When All the Pieces Fit
1989	"More Ways Than One"	—	—	—	—	—	—		When All the Pieces Fit
1989	"Back to the Start"	—	—	—	—	—	—		When All the Pieces Fit
1994	"Day in the Sun"	—	9	—	—	37	—		Peter Frampton
1994	"You Can Be Sure"	—	—	—	—	—	—		Peter Frampton
1994	"You"	—	—	—	—	—	—		Peter Frampton
1995	"I'm in You" (live)	—	—	—	—	—	—		Frampton Comes Alive! II
1995	"For Now" (live)	—	—	—	—	—	—		Frampton Comes Alive! II
2000	"You Had to Be There" (live)	—	—	—	—	—	—		Live in Detroit
2003	"Flying Without Wings"	—	—	—	—	—	—		Now
2006	"Black Hole Sun"	—	—	—	—	—	—		Fingerprints
2007	"Blowin' Smoke"	—	—	—	—	—	—		Fingerprints
2010	"I Want It Back/Road to The Sun" (with Julian Frampton)	—	—	—	—	—	—		Thank You Mr. Churchill
2014	"The Beat" (with The Bloody Beetroots)	—	—	—	—	—	—		Hide
2014	"Hummingbird in a Box"	—	—	—	—	—	—		Hummingbird in a Box: Songs for a Ballet
2016	"Do You Feel Like I Do" (acoustic)	—	—	—	—	—	—		Acoustic Classics
2017	"I Saved a Bird Today"	—	—	—	—	—	—		—

== Videography ==
=== Video albums ===
Year	Album details	Peak chart positions		Certifications
Year	Album details	UK	US	Certifications
1995	Frampton Comes Alive! II: Released: 4 January 1996; Label: A&M	121	—	RIAA: Gold
2000	Live in Detroit: Released: 16 May 2000; Label: CMC International	—	16	RIAA: Gold
2006	Off the Hook (Live in Chicago): Released: 2006; Label:	—	—	
2012	FCA!35 Tour: An Evening With Peter Frampton: Released: 13 Nov 2012; Label: Eagle Rock Entertainment	—	14	

== Guest appearances ==
Year	Title	Artist	Notes	Ref.
1970	All Things Must Pass	George Harrison	Acoustic guitar (uncredited)	
1972	Whistle Rymes	John Entwistle	Guitar	
1976	A Dose of Rock and Roll	Ringo Starr	Guitar, backing vocals	
1987	Never Let Me Down	David Bowie	Guitar, sitar	
1988	Glass Spider	David Bowie	Guitar, backing vocals, music director	
