= Rise Up (Peter Frampton album) =

Studio album / Live album by Peter Frampton
- Released: June 20, 1980
- Recorded: 1980; November 1979, The Breezeway, New York; Live tracks, July 1979
- Studio: The Breezeway, New York
- Genre: Rock
- Length: 35:38
- Label: A&M
- Producer: Peter Frampton

Peter Frampton chronology
Where I Should Be (1979)	Rise Up (1980)	Breaking All the Rules (1981)

Rise Up is an album released by Peter Frampton in 1980, featuring five earlier versions of tracks later re-recorded for Frampton's next studio album. As Frampton stated: "This album was released in Brazil to promote our tour there in 1980 - the album eventually turned into Breaking All the Rules, released the next year." Rise Up featured an almost entirely different lineup of musicians. "Midland Maniac" is the only studio track from Rise Up not to be featured on Breaking All the Rules, even in a re-recorded version.

== Track listing ==
1. "You Kill Me" - 4:13 (Peter Frampton)
2. "I Don't Wanna Let You Go" - 4:21 (Frampton)
3. "Rise Up" - 3:46 (Alessi Brothers)
4. "Breaking All the Rules" - 5:07 (Frampton, Keith Reid)
5. "Wasting the Night Away" - 4:12 (Frampton)
6. "Midland Maniac" - 4:18 (Originally by Steve Winwood, lyrics reworked by Peter Frampton)
7. "I Can't Stand It" (Live) - 4:13 (Frampton)
8. "I'm in You" (Live) - 4:10 (Frampton)

== Personnel ==
- Peter Frampton - Guitars, Keyboards, Vocals
- John Regan - Bass
- Jamie Oldaker - Drums

Additional Musicians:

- Anton Fig - drums on "Rise Up"
- Billy Alessi - Yamaha CP 70 and Korg ES 50 on "Rise Up"
- Elliot Randall - backup guitar on "Breaking All the Rules"
- Bob Sabino - keyboards on "Midland Maniac"

Musicians on live recordings:

"I Can't Stand It" (recorded live in Houston, Texas, July 1979)

- Peter Frampton - Guitars, Vocals
- Gary Mallaber - Drums
- Stanley Sheldon - Bass
- Bob Mayo - Keyboards, Background Vocals

"I'm in You" (recorded live in Houston, Texas, July 1979)

- Peter Frampton - Vocals
- Bob Mayo - Grand Piano, Background Vocals
