= Road Runner (Junior Walker album) =

Studio album by Junior Walker & the All-Stars
- Released: 1966
- Genre: R&B
- Label: Soul Records (US); Tamla/Motown (international)
- Producer: Johnny Bristol, Henry Cosby, Lamont Dozier, Harvey Fuqua, Berry Gordy, Jr., Brian Holland, Lawrence Horn, Mickey Stevenson

Junior Walker & the All-Stars chronology
Shotgun (1965)	Road Runner (1966)	Live (1967)

Road Runner is a 1966 album by Junior Walker & the All-Stars. The band's second album, it reached No. 6 on Billboard's Top R&B Albums chart and No. 64 on Billboard's Top Albums chart, launching four hit singles. First released on record by Motown's Soul label in the US and Tamla/Motown internationally, it has been multiply reissued on cassette and compact disc. It has also been remastered and reissued in conjunction with the band's following studio record, Home Cookin', as Road Runner & Home Cookin'.

== Songs ==
Among the album's notable songs were four charting singles. Peak among them at No. 3 on the R&B Singles, No. 18 on the Pop Singles charts and No. 22 on the UK Singles was the Holland–Dozier–Holland song "How Sweet It Is (to Be Loved By You)", which had previously hit for Marvin Gaye in 1964. Not far behind, "(I'm a) Road Runner", by the same songwriters, reached No. 4 on Black Singles and No. 20 on Pop Singles, while surpassing "How Sweet It Is" to reach No. 12 in the UK. "Pucker Up Buttercup" did not crack the top 10, but reached No. 11 Black Singles and No. 31 Pop Singles. A distant fourth, Junior Walker & the Allstar's cover of the 1959 Barrett Strong hit "Money (That's What I Want)" reached No. 35 Black Singles and No. 52 Pop Singles.

The album is titled for "(I'm a) Road Runner", which had been previously released on Junior Walker & The All-Star's 1965 debut album, Shotgun. It proved so successful in its March 1966 single that it was included and singled out on the band's follow-up. Although "How Sweet It Is (to Be Loved by You)" surpassed it in two out of three charts, "(I'm a) Road Runner" is regarded as a superior offering from Junior Walker & The All-Stars, one of three songs by the band (along with "Way Back Home" and "Shotgun" included in 1999's Da Capo Press publication The heart of rock & soul: the 1001 greatest singles ever made. Ranking it second of the three at no. 467, music critic David Marsh, identifying Junior Walker as "the one gutbucket star in Motown's heaven", says "even...[Robert Johnson] never saw the like of this blend of booming bass, tanked-up tambourine, and gritty guitar. Much less Walker's fractured saxophone." Sometimes known as "I'm a Road Runner", the song has been covered by a number of rock bands, including Fleetwood Mac (on album Penguin) and Peter Frampton (on I'm in You), and also by comedian Bill Cosby on Bill Cosby Sings Hooray For the Salvation Army Band!

== Track listing ==
1. "(I'm a) Road Runner" (Lamont Dozier, Brian Holland, Edward Holland, Jr.) – 2:49
2. "How Sweet It Is (to Be Loved by You)" (Dozier, Holland, Holland) – 3:04
3. "Pucker Up Buttercup" (Johnny Bristol, Danny Coggins, Harvey Fuqua) – 3:18
4. "Money (That's What I Want)" (Janie Bradford, Berry Gordy) – 4:34
5. "Last Call" (Frank Bryant, Autry DeWalt II, Lawrence Horn) – 2:23
6. "Anyway You Wannta" (Harvey Fuqua, Gwen Gordy) – 2:41
7. "Baby You Know You Ain't Right" (Autry DeWalt II, Lawrence Horn) – 2:34
8. "Amé Cherie (Soul Darling)" (James Graves, Horn, Victor Thomas, Willie Woods) – 4:13
9. "Twist Lackawanna" (DeWalt, Ronald White) – 2:19
10. "San-Ho-Zay" (Freddie King, Sonny Thompson) – 3:00
11. "Mutiny" (Henry Cosby) – 3:55

== Personnel ==
=== Performance ===
- James Graves – drums
- Vic Thomas – keyboards
- Junior Walker – saxophone, vocals
- Willie Woods – guitar
- James Jamerson - bass

=== Production ===
- Maggie Agard – package concept
- Jennifer Beal – master tape research
- Johnny Bristol – producer
- Henry Cosby – producer
- Lamont Dozier – producer
- Ellen Fitton – remastering
- Harvey Fuqua – producer
- Berry Gordy, Jr. – producer
- Suha Gur – mixing
- Brian Holland – producer
- Lawrence Horn – producer
- Joan Pace – master tape research
- Andrew Skurow – research, annotation
- Mickey Stevenson – producer
- Harry Weinger – project coordinator, A&R
- Ben Young – package design
