= Holding On to You =

Holding on to You may refer to:

- "Holding on to You" (Peter Frampton song)
- "Holding on to You" (Twenty One Pilots song)
- "Holding on to You", a 1995 single by Terence Trent D'Arby from Vibrator
