= (I'm a) Road Runner =

Single by Junior Walker & the Allstars

from the album Road Runner
- B-side: "Shoot Your Shot"
- Released: 1966
- Recorded: 1965
- Genre: Rhythm and blues
- Length: 2:49
- Label: Soul
- Songwriter: Holland–Dozier–Holland

Junior Walker & the Allstars singles chronology
"Cleo's Back" (1966)	"(I'm a) Road Runner" (1966)	"Cleo's Mood" (1966)

Music video
- [I'm A] Road Runner on YouTube

"(I'm a) Road Runner" is a hit song by Junior Walker & the Allstars, and was the title track of the successful 1966 album Road Runner. Written by the team of Holland–Dozier–Holland, it was released on the Tamla (Motown) label in 1966 and reached number 20 in the U.S. and in 1969 number 12 in the UK.

== Background ==
Walker plays the distinctive tenor saxophone solo, backed by Mike Terry on baritone saxophone with Willie Woods on guitar. During the recording, it was discovered that Walker could play the song in only two keys. So Walker sang in a key that he could not play, and after being recorded, the saxophone track was sped up to match.

The pictorial single sleeve used a running bird similar to the Road Runner cartoon character.

== Personnel ==
Junior Walker & the Allstars

- Junior Walker – tenor saxophone solo, vocals
- Willie Woods – guitar
- Victor Thomas – organ
- James Graves – drums

Additional personnel

- Johnny Dawson – tambourine
- The Funk Brothers – other instrumentation
  - Johnny Griffith – piano
  - James Jamerson – bass
  - Joe Messina – guitar
  - Norris Patterson – tenor saxophone
  - Mike Terry – baritone saxophone
  - Eddie Willis – guitar

== Chart history ==
Chart (1966)	Peak position
U.K. Singles Chart	12
U.S. Billboard Hot 100	20
U.S. Billboard Top Selling R&B Singles	4

== Later versions ==
- Humble Pie included an extended version of this song titled, "Road Runner/Road Runner's 'G' Jam", in their 1972 album Smokin'.
- British-American rock group Fleetwood Mac recorded the song with Dave Walker on lead vocals for their 1973 album Penguin.
- The Jerry Garcia Band performed a version of the song in 1975, which was featured on The Jerry Garcia Collection, Vol. 2: Let It Rock.
- James Taylor performed his version, in September 1976, in episode 1 of the second season of Saturday Night Live. Taylor also included the song on his 2008 album Covers.
- Steve Gaines from Lynyrd Skynyrd performed the song with his own band, Crawdad, in the mid-1970s. A recording of them performing it was released on Gaines's 2001 live compilation CD, Okie Special.
- Peter Frampton included the song on his 1977 album I'm in You.
- Publishing rights organization BMI had songwriters Holland-Dozier-Holland credited with co-writing Steve Winwood's 1988 song "Roll with It" due to its resemblance to "(I'm a) Roadrunner".
- The Grateful Dead performed a version as the opening song at their concert on March 21, 1986, at Hampton Coliseum.
