= Live in San Francisco, March 24, 1975 =

Peter Frampton, Live In San Francisco, March 24, 1975 is an in-studio live recording by Peter Frampton, released in 2004, and the precursor to the record breaking "Frampton Comes Alive." It's a much more intimate show, with no audience, broadcast on San Francisco's KSAN from Sausalito's Record Plant, literally only months before he recorded the Live album, "Frampton Comes Alive," that would break records as one of the best-selling live albums in the United States.

== Reception ==
Concert Vault considered: "This record provides an excellent testament to Frampton's prowess as a guitarist. Opening with the solo acoustic, "Wind Of Change," the recording is one strong example after another of his fluid and tasteful guitar stylings."

== Track listing ==
All songs from Peter Frampton except where noted.

1. "Introduction"
2. "Wind of Change"
3. "Baby, I Love Your Way"
4. "Something's Happening"
5. "Day's Dawning"
6. "Lines On My Face"
7. "Doobie Wah" (Frampton/Rick Willis/John Headley-Down)
8. "It's A Plain Shame"
9. "I Wanna Go To The Sun"
10. "(I'll Give You) Money"
11. "Do You Feel Like We Do" (Wills/Mick Gallagher/John Siomos/Frampton)
12. "Closing"

== Personnel ==
- Peter Frampton – lead vocals, lead guitar, talkbox in "Do You Feel Like We Do"
- Bob Mayo – rhythm guitar, piano, Fender Rhodes electric piano, Hammond organ, vocals
- Andy Bown – bass guitar, vocals
- John Siomos – drums
- Mike Zagaris - cover photo
