= I'm in You (song) =

- Artwork for the US single

Single by Peter Frampton

from the album I'm in You
- B-side: "St. Thomas (Don't You Know How I Feel)"
- Released: May 1977
- Recorded: 1976
- Genre: Soft rock
- Length: 4:10
- Label: A&M
- Songwriter: Peter Frampton
- Producer: Peter Frampton

Peter Frampton singles chronology
"Do You Feel Like We Do" (1976)	"I'm in You" (1977)	"Signed, Sealed, Delivered I'm Yours" (1977)

Alternative release
- One of side-A labels of the UK single

"I'm in You" is the hit song released by Peter Frampton as a single from his album I'm in You, released in 1977. The song is Frampton's biggest hit on charts around the world. It rose to No. 2 on the US Billboard Hot 100 for 3 weeks (having been denied the No. 1 spot by Andy Gibb's "I Just Want to Be Your Everything") and No. 1 on the Cash Box Top 100 and in Canada.

== Writing and recording ==
"I'm in You" was written by Peter Frampton after returning to New York City from touring to record his live album Frampton Comes Alive! in 1976.

The song is about Frampton's recent separation from his first wife, model Mary Lovett.

The song was recorded at Electric Lady Studios in Manhattan's Greenwich Village. Frampton demanded that bodyguards keep overzealous fans from disturbing his recording sessions.

This song is mostly keyboard-driven, featuring background vocals from Mick Jagger, with the sound of a Baldwin Piano, Moog synthesizer, ARP String Synthesizer, Gibson Les Paul, acoustic guitar, bass guitar, drums, percussion, and vocals. It is therefore omitted from the set list of his live performances of "Frampton's Guitar Circus", in spite of being his biggest hit.

Billboard described it as a "grandly contemporary rock ballad with a deep but touching lyric." Cash Box said that "it is Peter's voice in front of a string-led wall of sound, with occasional piano and guitar emphasis, that give the single a soaring quality." Record World said that it "relies on a quiet intensity to deliver its message, and its impact increases with each listening."

Frampton re-recorded the song for acoustic guitar for his 2016 CD Acoustic Classic

Frank Zappa wrote I Have Been in You as a reaction to this song.

== Personnel ==
- Peter Frampton – electric guitar, acoustic guitar, piano, ARP String Synthesizer, vocals
- Bob Mayo – Moog synthesizer, background vocals
- Stanley Sheldon – bass guitar
- John Siomos – drums, percussion
- Mick Jagger – background vocals

== Charts ==
=== Weekly charts ===
Weekly chart performance for "I'm in You"
Chart (1977)	Peak position
Australia (KMR)	9
Canada Top Singles (RPM)	1
Canada Adult Contemporary (RPM)	11
New Zealand	13
UK (OCC)	41
US Billboard Hot 100	2
US Billboard Adult Contemporary	26
US Cash Box Top 100	1

=== Year-end charts ===
Year-end chart performance for "I'm in You"
Chart (1977)	Rank
Australia (Kent Music Report)	65
Canada	26
US Billboard Hot 100	42
US Cash Box Top 100	49

== Certifications ==
Certifications for "I'm in You"
Region	Certification	Certified units/sales
Canada (Music Canada)	Gold	75,000^{^}
^{^} Shipments figures based on certification alone.

== See also ==
- "I Have Been in You"
- List of Cash Box Top 100 number-one singles of 1977
