= Live (Junior Walker album) =

Live album by Junior Walker and the All-Stars
- Released: 1970
- Recorded: 1970
- Genre: Soul, funk, rhythm & blues
- Label: Soul, Tamla Motown
- Producer: Johnny Bristol

Junior Walker and the All-Stars chronology
A Gasssss (1970)	Live (1970)	Rainbow Funk (1971)

Live is an album by soul and funk artists Junior Walker and the All-Stars released in 1970 on the Soul label in the US, and Tamla Motown in the UK.

== Track listing ==
No.	Title	Writer(s)	Length
1.	"Intro- Hip City Part 1 Hip City Part 2"	Junior Walker, Eddie Hollis, Janie Bradford
2.	"Sweet Soul"	Johnny Bristol, Harvey Fuqua, Vernon Bullock
3.	"Home Cookin'"	Melvin Moy, Henry Cosby, Eddie Willis
4.	"Something You Got"	Fats Domino, Chris Kenner
5.	"(I Know) I'm Losing You"	Cornelius Grant, Eddie Holland, Norman Whitfield
6.	"Come See About Me"	Holland-Dozier-Holland
7.	"What Does It Take (to Win Your Love)"	Bristol, Fuqua, Bullock
8.	"Medley: Shotgun & What Does It Take (to Win Your Love)"	Walker, Bristol, Fuqua, Bullock

== Credits ==
- Johnny Bristol - producer
- Don Holden - lacquer cut
- Jim Ladwig - album design
- Curtis McNair - art direction
