= The Art of Control =

Studio album by Peter Frampton
- Released: 17 August 1982
- Recorded: 1982
- Genre: Pop rock
- Length: 36:02
- Label: A&M
- Producer: Peter Frampton, Eddie Kramer

Peter Frampton chronology
Breaking All the Rules (1981)	The Art of Control (1982)	Premonition (1986)

Professional ratings
Review scores
Source	Rating
AllMusic	2/5 stars
The Encyclopedia of Popular Music	2/5 stars

The Art of Control is the eighth studio solo album by Peter Frampton, released in 1982 on A&M Records. It was his last for the label.

According to Peter Frampton, the record company, A&M forced him to make a commercial, radio-friendly album that he felt didn't sound like a "Peter Frampton album", which has caused him to hate the album.

== Reception ==
A contemporary review in Kerrang! said the first song "has no hook, you see. And neither do the other 8 on the album. Sure, they have choruses, but they're mostly one-liners repeated over and over again in a high voice just so you remember the words, but they don't boast one memorable melody between them."

== Japanese reissue ==
The original mix of the album was reissued in Japan in a miniature replica of the original album artwork. The album was remastered, for this reissue using Direct Stream Digital (DSD) to transfer the digital files and included the bonus tracks added to the Compact disc (CD) release of the album. The release was a limited edition in the SHM-CD format. The reissue included a picture of the original vinyl label.

Super High Material (SHM), is a manufacturing process utilized on some Japanese pre-recorded Compact Discs (SHM-CDs) and super audio compact discs (SHM-SACDs)

== Track listing ==
All songs written by Peter Frampton and Mark Goldenberg.

Side one

No.	Title	Length
1.	"I Read the News"	4:00
2.	"Sleepwalk"	4:35
3.	"Save Me"	3:46
4.	"Back to Eden"	4:46

Side two

No.	Title	Length
1.	"An Eye for an Eye"	3:50
2.	"Don't Think About Me"	3:42
3.	"Heart in the Fire"	4:27
4.	"Here Comes Caroline"	3:40
5.	"Barbara's Vacation"	3:16

== Personnel ==
- Peter Frampton - lead vocals, lead guitar, bass guitar, keyboards, guitar synthesizer
- Mark Goldenberg - rhythm guitar, keyboards, backing vocals
- John Regan - bass guitar
- Harry Stinson - drums
- Ian Lloyd - backing vocals on "I Read the News", "An Eye for an Eye", "Heart in the Fire" and "Barbara's Vacation"
- Eddie Kramer - backing vocals on "Barbara's Vacation"
- JD Dworkow - backing vocals on "Barbara's Vacation"

Engineering

- Eddie Kramer - engineer, mixer
- Guy Charbonneau - assistant engineer
- Alan Myerson - assistant engineer
- Cliff Bonnell - assistant engineer
- Phil Magnotti - assistant engineer
- Mike Scott - assistant engineer
- Don Wershba - assistant engineer
- George Marino - mastering engineer
- Hitoshi Takiguchi - mastering engineer

Album artwork

- Norman Moore - artwork direction, cover artwork, cover artwork concept, design
- Glenn Wexler - cover artwork photography
- Jeffrey Kent Ayeroff - artwork direction
- Shinjiro Kawashima - artwork research
- Chihiro Nozaki - artwork coordinator

== Sales chart performance ==
Album

Year	Chart	Position
1982	Billboard 200 (US)	174
