= Frampton Comes Alive! II =

Live album by Peter Frampton
- Released: 10 October 1995
- Recorded: August 1992; 15–16 June 1995
- Venue: Ventura Theatre (Ventura, California); The Fillmore (San Francisco, California)
- Genre: Rock
- Length: 72:26 (single CD); 114:43 (double CD)
- Label: El Dorado/IRS Records
- Producer: Peter Frampton

Peter Frampton chronology
Peter Frampton (1994)	Frampton Comes Alive! II (1995)	Now (2003)

Professional ratings
Review scores
Source	Rating
Allmusic	3/5 stars
The Encyclopedia of Popular Music	2/5 stars

Frampton Comes Alive! II (styled as Frampton Comes Alive II on the packaging) is Peter Frampton's second live album published in 1995. It is a sequel to his 1976 multiplatinum album Frampton Comes Alive.

The album contains live versions of many of the songs from his 1980s and 1990s solo albums, consciously avoiding his 1970s hits. It was accompanied by a video release on VHS, recorded at The Fillmore in San Francisco on 15 June 1995.

Frampton Comes Alive II was released on 10 October 1995 under IRS Records. Despite Jerry Pompili's optimistic introductory remarks, the album did not achieve commercial success. It reached No. 121 on the UK Albums Chart and did not chart in the United States.

All songs for the 1995 release were recorded at The Fillmore on 15 June 1995 except "Off the Hook", which was recorded the following evening on 16 June, and "More Ways Than One", recorded in August 1992 at the Ventura Theatre in Ventura, California. A special edition of the album was released on 30 January 2007 with four extra songs containing four hits from the 1970s. A DVD edition was released at the same time.

== Track listing ==
1. "Introduction by Jerry Pompili"
2. "Day in the Sun" – (Peter Frampton, Kevin Savigar)
3. "Lying" – (Frampton)
4. "For Now" – (Frampton, Pat MacDonald, Steve Seskin)
5. "Most of All" (Frampton, John Regan)
6. "You" – (Frampton, Kevin Savigar)
7. "Waiting For Your Love" – (Frampton, Kevin Savigar)
8. "I'm in You" – (Frampton)
9. "Talk To Me" – (Frampton)
10. "Hang on To a Dream" – (Tim Hardin)
11. "Can't Take That Away" (Frampton, Jonathan Cain)
12. "More Ways Than One" – (Frampton, Danny Wilde)
13. "Almost Said Goodbye" – (Frampton, Mark Hudson, Dennis Greaves)
14. "Off The Hook" – (Frampton, Kevin Savigar)

2007 Special Edition Disc 2

1. "Show Me The Way" – (Frampton)
2. "Nassau/Baby, I Love Your Way" – (Frampton)
3. "Lines on My Face" – (Frampton)
4. "Do You Feel Like We Do" – (Frampton, Mick Gallagher, Rick Wills, John Siomos)

== Personnel ==
- Peter Frampton – guitar, talkbox, vocals
- Bob Mayo – keyboard, guitar, backing vocals
- John Regan – bass guitar, backing vocals
- J. R. Robinson – drums, percussion
- Mike Zagaris – cover photo

== Certifications ==
Region	Certification	Certified units/sales
United States (RIAA) Video	Gold	50,000^{^}
^{^} Shipments figures based on certification alone.

== See also ==
- Frampton Comes Alive!
- Peter Frampton discography
