= Blow the House Down (album) =

Studio album by Junior Walker
- Released: 1983
- Genre: Soul, R&B
- Label: Motown
- Producer: Hal Davis (tracks 1, 3, 4), Alpha Centauri Ltd. (track 1), Junior Walker (tracks 2, 6), R.C. Ratliff (track 2), Norman Whitfield (track 5), Wille Hutch (track 7), Benny Medina (track 8), Kerry Ashby (track 8)

Junior Walker chronology
Back Street Boogie (1979)	Blow the House Down (1983)	19 Greatest Hits (1987)

Blow the House Down is an album by the American saxophonist Junior Walker, released in 1983. It marked the third time that Walker had signed with Motown Records. "Closer than Close" was released as a single.

The album peaked at No. 210 on the Billboard 200. Walker supported the album with a North American tour.

== Production ==
Billed without his All Stars, the album included Walker's son, Autry DeWalt III, on drums. It contains Walker's take on "Urgent", the 1981 Foreigner hit on which he had played a much-praised sax solo.

== Critical reception ==
Professional ratings
Review scores
Source	Rating
AllMusic	3/5 stars
Robert Christgau	B+
The Encyclopedia of Popular Music	2/5 stars
Green Bay Press-Gazette	3.5/4 stars

Robert Christgau thought that "Walker was always funky in the generic sense, but on this welcome return to his home label eight different producers help him get all fashionably funky as well—without any sense of strain." The Globe and Mail wrote that "the Walker sound is padded and filled with synthesizers, back-up singers and a couple of dozen studio musicians, but the music is never choked in the modern studio mix the way so many Motown albums are these days."

The Philadelphia Inquirer praised "Sex Pot", writing that it "has all the bite and wit of Walker at his best... In the '60s, this song might have put him in the Top 10 again; these days, however, a big, lewd piece of music like this scares off rock radio programmers." The Buffalo News deemed the album "real unabashed, bopping R&B." The Green Bay Press-Gazette said that "Walker is in excellent form in earthy singing and many blistering sax runs."

AllMusic noted the album's themes of "sex and lust," writing that "Walker's signifying sax cries are showcased on eight explosive tracks."

== Track listing ==
No.	Title	Writer(s)	Length
1.	"Sex Pot"	Angelo Bond, Kennedy William	3:59
2.	"Rise and Shine"	Angelo Bond, Junior Walker, R. C. Ratliff	3:57
3.	"Closer than Close"	Gerald Albright, Willie Hutch	4:38
4.	"Ball Baby"	Angelo Bond, Hal Davis, Junior Walker	7:28
5.	"T-OO (T Double O)"	John Whitfield, Michael Whitfield	5:47
6.	"Urgent"	Mick Jones	4:41
7.	"In and Out"	Willie Hutch	3:44
8.	"Blow the House Down"	Al Boyd, Kerry Ashby	4:00
