= Frampton Forgets the Words =

Studio album by Peter Frampton
- Released: 23 April 2021
- Studios: Studio Phenix, Nashville, Tennessee
- Length: 47:59
- Label: UMe
- Producers: Chuck Ainlay; Peter Frampton

Peter Frampton chronology
All Blues (2019)	Frampton Forgets the Words (2021)

Frampton Forgets the Words is the eighteenth studio album by the English rock musician Peter Frampton (credited to the Peter Frampton Band). It was released by UMe on 23 April 2021. The album contains instrumental versions of some of Frampton's favourite songs by other artists. As a follow-up to his 2019 album of blues covers, All Blues, and farewell tour, and the 2020 publication of his autobiography, Do You Feel Like I Do?, the album continues Frampton's burst of work in response to being diagnosed with inclusion body myositis in 2014.

== Background and recording ==
With Frampton Forgets the Words, Peter Frampton revisited the all-instrumental approach of his 2006 album Fingerprints. He undertook the project out of a continued will to work, aware of the gradual degenerative effects of inclusion body myositis (IBM) on his muscle capabilities. In the choice of material, the album reflects Frampton's early-career collaborators and friends (David Bowie, George Harrison), his enduring fondness for Motown (Stevie Wonder, Marvin Gaye), and his appreciation for more recent songs by artists such as Roxy Music, Lenny Kravitz, Alison Krauss and Radiohead. He has said that his guitar-based interpretations are tributes to these artists' recordings, rather than standard cover versions.

Frampton and his band recorded the album in early 2019. It was part of an intensive period of recording that began in October 2018, following their tour with Steve Miller, which also produced All Blues, a second blues album, and "half a solo album". He and the band then performed his Finale Tour of the United States and Canada between May and October 2019. The COVID pandemic forced him to cancel the European leg of the farewell tour, scheduled for May 2020. He said that the pandemic has also interrupted their studio work, and he had then turned his attention to promoting his autobiography.

Recording for Forgets the Words took place at Studio Phenix – Frampton's home studio in Nashville, Tennessee – and the album was produced by him and Chuck Ainlay. Frampton played all the lead parts on his signature 1954 Gibson Les Paul guitar. He recalls that recording the tributes to Harrison and Bowie was a sad experience, particularly Bowie's "Loving the Alien", since it was Frampton's spotlight moment on stage when he and Bowie toured together in the 1980s. When announcing the release in January 2021, he described Forgets the Words as "a collection of 10 of my favorite pieces of music". He has also said that he chose not to sing the songs because his guitar is his "better voice".

== Music videos ==
Frampton made music videos for some of the album's tracks. Credited to Phenix Films, the clips were created with Rob Arthur, his keyboardist, who has also directed videos for the Doobie Brothers and Dave Mason.

The video for Frampton's interpretation of Radiohead's "Reckoner" was released on 29 January, coinciding with the announcement of the album. On 26 February, he debuted the video for his cover of Roxy Music's "Avalon". The video for "Loving the Alien" premiered on the Grammy Awards' website on 25 March, coinciding with Frampton's interview for the site. When asked in the interview about his hopes for completing the farewell tour, he said he had to be "realistic" since: "we've got two clocks right now, worldwide ... One is our life-clock and one is the COVID clock ... But I have a third clock, which is my IBM ... Slowly but surely, unfortunately, I'm losing strength in my hands, my arms and my legs."

On 16 April, he released the video for Harrison's song "Isn't It a Pity". It shows Frampton acclimatising to life under lockdown with the cancellation of his 2020 concert itinerary, struggling with boredom at home, and Zooming with family members.

== Release and reception ==
Professional ratings
Review scores
Source	Rating
AllMusic	3/5 stars
American Songwriter	4/5 stars
Classic Rock	3.5/5 stars
Riff Magazine	7/10
The Spill Magazine	4/5

UMe released Frampton Forgets the Words on 23 April 2021. As with All Blues, the artist credit is the Peter Frampton Band. The album cover includes a vintage Phenix typewriter and, as a pun on the title of the collection, a blank sheet of paper inside the machine. The album was made available on a single CD, a double LP on standard vinyl, and a double LP on "Coke Bottle Clear Coloured" vinyl. In the US, Forgets the Words debuted at number 12 on the Billboard 200 chart.

In his review for American Songwriter, Hal Horowitz admires the purity of Frampton's guitar playing on the album, saying that this aspect was often lost behind crowd-pleasing "talk-box showboating" in the artist's live performances. He says the album shows Frampton's "superb guitar prowess" in a wide range of stylistic settings, from rock and soul to country, jazz, dream pop and funk. Max Bell of Classic Rock describes the guitar arrangements as "richly toned" and "stately", and sufficiently refined that the diverse material can sit together on one collection. He highlights the versions of Wonder's "I Don't Know Why" and Michel Colombier's "Dreamland", and concludes of the album: "Herd immunity for troubling times. The Beckenham boy done good."

Reviewing for The Spill Magazine, Bryan Williston says that Frampton provides the exception to the idea that a new release by an "aging rocker" deserves to be ignored. He finds Frampton's nuanced playing an effective substitute for a human voice, adding, "If rock pedigree, amazing chops and awesome tone are your thing, this collection is a must-have." David Gill of Riff Magazine considers the slower, emotive adaptations of the Harrison, Bowie and Roxy Music songs to be more effective than the album's heavier rock tracks. He deems Forgets the Words a "poignant snapshot" of an artist whose playing abilities are under threat, yet still seeks to create and to connect with his audience in the COVID era.

== Track listing ==
1. "If You Want Me to Stay" (Sly Stone) – 5:35
2. "Reckoner" (Thom Yorke, Jonny Greenwood, Ed O'Brien, Colin Greenwood, Philip Selway) – 6:15
3. "Dreamland" (Michel Colombier, Jaco Pastorius) – 4:04
4. "One More Heartache" (Marv Tarplin, Robert Rogers, Ronald White, Smokey Robinson, Warren Moore) – 4:26
5. "Avalon" (Bryan Ferry) – 5:08
6. "Isn't It a Pity" (George Harrison) – 4:51
7. "I Don't Know Why" (Stevie Wonder, Paul Riser, Don Hunter, Lula Hardaway) – 2:50
8. "Are You Gonna Go My Way" (Lenny Kravitz, Craig Ross) – 3:24
9. "Loving the Alien" (David Bowie) – 7:04
10. "Maybe" (Gordon Kennedy, Phil Madeira) – 4:25

== Personnel ==
Peter Frampton Band

- Peter Frampton – guitars, drum programming
- Adam Lester – guitars
- Glenn Worf – bass guitar
- Rob Arthur – electric piano, Hammond organ, synthesizer, drum programming, string arrangements
- Dan Wojciechowski – drums, percussion

Additional musicians

- Gordon Kennedy – 12-string electric guitar (track 6), 6-string acoustic guitar (10)
- Eric Darken – percussion (1, 9)
