= Junior Walker =

American musical artist (1931–1995)

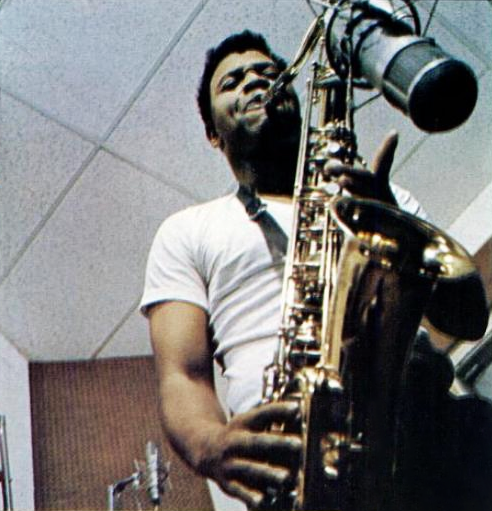
- Junior Walker in 1966

Background information
- Born: Autry DeWalt Mixon; June 14, 1931; Blytheville, Arkansas, U.S.
- Died: November 23, 1995 (aged 64) Battle Creek, Michigan
- Genres: R&B; pop; rock; soul
- Occupation: Musician
- Instruments: Tenor saxophone, vocals
- Years active: 1945–1995
- Labels: Motown, Whitfield

Autry DeWalt Mixon Jr. (June 14, 1931 – November 23, 1995), known professionally as Junior Walker, was an American multi-instrumentalist (primarily saxophonist) and vocalist who recorded for Motown during the 1960s. He also performed as a session and live-performing saxophonist with the band Foreigner during the 1980s.

== Early life ==
Walker was born Autry DeWalt Mixon Jr. on June 14, 1931, in Blytheville, Arkansas, but grew up in South Bend, Indiana. He began playing saxophone while in high school, and his saxophone style was the anchor for the sound of the bands he later played in.

== Career ==
His career started when he developed his own band in the mid-1950s as the Jumping Jacks. His longtime friend and drummer Billy Nicks (1935–2017) formed his own group, the Rhythm Rockers. Periodically, Nicks would sit in on Jumping Jack's shows, and Walker would sit in on the Rhythm Rockers shows.

Nicks obtained a permanent gig at a local TV station in South Bend, Indiana, and asked Walker to join him and keyboard player Fred Patton permanently. Nicks asked Willie Woods (1936–1997), a local singer, to perform with the group; Woods would learn how to play guitar. When Nicks was drafted into the United States Army, Walker convinced the band to move from South Bend to Battle Creek, Michigan. While performing in Benton Harbor, Walker found a drummer, Tony Washington, to replace Nicks. Eventually, Fred Patton left the group, and Victor Thomas stepped in. The original name, The Rhythm Rockers, was changed to "The All Stars." Walker's style was inspired by jump blues and early R&B, particularly players like Louis Jordan, Earl Bostic, and Illinois Jacquet.

The group was spotted by Johnny Bristol, and in 1961 he recommended them to Harvey Fuqua, who had his own record labels. Once the group started recording on the Harvey label, their name was changed to Jr. Walker & the All Stars. The name was modified again when Fuqua's labels were taken over by Motown's Berry Gordy, and Jr. Walker & the All Stars became members of the Motown family, recording for their Soul imprint in 1964.

The members of the band changed after the acquisition of the Harvey label. Tony Washington, the drummer, quit the group, and James Graves joined. Their first and signature hit was "Shotgun", written and composed by Walker and produced by Berry Gordy, which featured the Funk Brothers' James Jamerson on bass and Benny Benjamin on drums. "Shotgun" reached No. 4 on the Billboard Hot 100 and No. 1 on the R&B chart in 1965, and was followed by many other hits, such as "(I'm a) Road Runner", "Shake and Fingerpop" and remakes of two Motown songs "Come See About Me" and "How Sweet It Is (to Be Loved by You)", that had previously been hits for the Supremes and Marvin Gaye respectively. In 1966, Graves left and was replaced by old cohort Billy "Stix" Nicks, and Walker's hits continued apace with tunes such as "Pucker Up Buttercup" and "Money (That's What I Want)".

In 1969, the group had another hit enter the top 5, "What Does It Take (to Win Your Love)". A Motown quality control meeting rejected this song for single release, but radio station DJs made the track popular, resulting in Motown releasing it as a single, whereupon it reached No. 4 on the Hot 100 and No. 1 on the R&B chart. From that time on, Walker sang more on the records than earlier in their career. He landed several more R&B Top Ten hits over the next few years, with the last coming in 1972. He toured the UK in 1970 with drummer Jerome Teasley (Wilson Pickett), guitarist Phil Wright (brother of Betty "Clean Up Woman" Wright), keyboardist Sonny Holley (The Temptations) and the youthful Liverpool UK bassist Norm Bellis (Apple). The band played two venues on each of the 14 nights. The finale was at The Valbonne in London's West End. They were joined on stage by The Four Tops for an impromptu set. In 1979, Walker went solo, disbanding the All Stars, and was signed to Norman Whitfield's Whitfield Records label, but he was not as successful on his own as he had been with the All Stars in his Motown period.

Jr. Walker

Walker re-formed the All Stars in the 1980s. On April 11, 1981, Walker was the musical guest on the season finale of Saturday Night Live. Foreigner's 1981 album 4 featured Walker's sax solo on "Urgent". He later recorded his own version of the song for the 1983 All Stars's album Blow the House Down. Walker's version was also featured in the 1985 Madonna film Desperately Seeking Susan. In 1983, Walker was re-signed with Motown. In the same year, he appeared as a part of the Motown 25 television special which aired on May 16, 1983.

In 1988, Walker played opposite Sam Moore as one-half of the fictional soul duo The Swanky Modes in the comedy Tapeheads. Several songs were recorded for the soundtrack, including "Bet Your Bottom Dollar" and "Ordinary Man", produced by ex-Blondie member Nigel Harrison.

== Death ==
Walker died of cancer at the age of 64 in Battle Creek, Michigan, on November 23, 1995. He is buried in Oak Hill Cemetery in Battle Creek under a marker inscribed with both his birth name of Autry DeWalt Mixon Jr. and his stage name.

== Awards and honors ==
Junior Walker & the All Stars received three Grammy Award nominations:

- "Shotgun" – Best Rhythm and Blues Recording (1965)
- "What Does It Take" – Best R&B Instrumental Performance (1969)
- "Wishing on a Star" – Best R&B Instrumental Performance (1979)

He was inducted into the Rhythm and Blues Foundation in 1995. Walker's "Shotgun" was inducted into the Grammy Hall of Fame in 2002. Jr. Walker & the All Stars were voted into the Michigan Rock and Roll Legends Hall of Fame in 2007.

== Discography ==
=== Studio albums ===
Year	Album	Chart positions	
Year	Album	US	US R&B
1965	Shotgun: Released on May 31, 1965; Label: Soul 701	108	1
1966	Soul Session: Released March 1966; Label: Soul 702	130	7
1966	Road Runner: Released August 1966; Label: Soul 703	64	6
1969	Home Cookin': Released on January 6, 1969; Label: Soul 710	172	26
1969	Gotta Hold on to This Feeling: Reissued in 1970 as 'What Does It Take to Win Your Love'; Released in UK as 'These Eyes' (Tamla Motown STML 11140); Released on November 21, 1969; Label: Soul 721	92	12
1970	A Gassssssssss!: Released on September 8, 1970; Label: Soul 726	110	28
1971	Rainbow Funk: Released on July 12, 1971; Label: Soul 732	91	12
1971	Moody Jr.: Released on December 7, 1971; Label: Soul 733	142	22
1973	Peace and Understanding Is Hard to Find: Label: Soul 738	—	47
1974	Jr. Walker & the All Stars: Cancelled in the US; Released in UK & Europe; Label: Tamla Motown STML 11274	—	—
1976	Hot Shot: Label: Soul S6-745	—	45
1976	Sax Appeal: Label: Soul S6-747	—	—
1977	Whopper Bopper Show Stopper: Label: Soul S6-748	—	—
1978	Smooth: Label: Soul S6-750	—	—
1979	Back Street Boogie: Label: Whitfield WHK 3331	—	72
1983	Blow the House Down: Label: Motown 6053ML	—	—
"—" denotes releases that did not chart or were not released in that territory.

=== Live albums ===
Year	Album	Chart positions	
Year	Album	US	US R&B
1967	"Live!": Released in September 1967; Label: Soul 705	119	22
1970	Live: Released in April 1970; Label: Soul 725	—	22
"—" denotes releases that did not chart.

=== Compilation albums ===
Year	Album	Chart positions	
Year	Album	US	US R&B
1969	Greatest Hits: Released in June 1969; Label: Soul 718	43	19
1973	Greatest Hits, Vol. 2 (UK-only): Released in 1973; Label: Tamla Motown STML 11224	—	—
1974	Anthology: Released on July 22, 1974; Label: Motown M7-786	—	—
1980	Motown Superstar Series, Vol. 5: Released in 1980; Label: Motown M5-105V1	—	—
1982	Greatest Hits (UK-only): Released in March 1982; Label: Tamla Motown STMS5054	—	—
1983	All The Great Hits: Released in 1983; Label: Motown 5297 ML	—	—
1986	19 Greatest Hits (Compact Command Performances): Released in 1986; Label: Motown MCDO6203MD	—	—
1994	Nothin' But Soul (The Singles 1962-1983): Released in 1994; Label: Motown 37463-6270-2	—	—
1997	The Ultimate Collection: Released in 1997; Label: Motown 314530828-2	—	—
2000	The Best of Jr. Walker & The All Stars (20th Century Masters/The Millennium Collection): Released on August 15, 2000; Label: Motown 012 159 283-2	—	—
2003	The Definitive Collection: Released in 2008; Label: Motown/UMe B0011550-02	—	—
"—" denotes releases that did not chart.

=== Singles ===
Year	Title (A-side / B-side) (Both sides from same album except where indicated)	Peak chart positions			Album
Year	Title (A-side / B-side) (Both sides from same album except where indicated)	US	US R&B	UK	Album
1962	"Twist Lackawanna" b/w "Willie's Blues" (Non-album track)	—	—	—	Road Runner
1962	"Cleo's Mood" b/w "Brainwasher" (from Soul Session)	—	—	—	Shotgun
1963	"Good Rockin'" b/w "Brainwasher Pt. 2" (Non-album track)	—	—	—	Soul Session
1964	"Satan's Blues" b/w "Monkey Jump" (from Shotgun)	—	—	—	Soul Session
1965	"Shotgun" b/w "Hot Cha"	4	1	—	Shotgun
1965	"Do the Boomerang" b/w "Tune Up"	36	10	—	Shotgun
1965	"Shake and Fingerpop" /	29	7	—	Shotgun
1965	"Cleo's Back"	43	7	—	Shotgun
1966	"(I'm a) Road Runner" b/w "Shoot Your Shot"	20	4	12	Shotgun
1966	"Cleo's Mood" b/w "Baby You Know You Ain't Right" (from Road Runner)	50	14	—	Shotgun
1966	"How Sweet It Is (To Be Loved by You)" b/w "Nothing But Soul" (Non-album track)	18	3	22	Road Runner
1966	"Money (That's What I Want), Pt.1" b/w "Money (That's What I Want), Pt. 2"	52	35	—	Road Runner
1967	"Pucker Up Buttercup" b/w "Anyway You Wannta"	31	11	—	Road Runner
1967	"Shoot Your Shot" b/w "Ain't That the Truth"	44	33	—	Shotgun
1967	"Come See About Me" b/w "Sweet Soul"	24	8	—	Home Cookin'
1968	"Hip City, Pt. 2" b/w "Hip City, Pt. 1"	31	7	—	Home Cookin'
1968	"Home Cookin'" b/w "Mutiny"	42	19	—	Home Cookin'
1969	"What Does It Take (to Win Your Love)" b/w "Brainwasher (Part 1)" (from Soul Session)	4	1	13	Home Cookin'
1969	"These Eyes" b/w "I've Got to Find a Way to Win Maria Back"	16	3	—	What Does It Take to Win Your Love
1970	"Gotta Hold On to This Feeling" b/w "Clinging to the Thought That She's Coming Back"	21	2	—	What Does It Take to Win Your Love
1970	"Do You See My Love (For You Growing)" b/w "Groove and Move"	32	3	—	A Gasssss
1970	"Holly Holy" /	75	33	—	A Gasssss
1970	"Carry Your Own Load"	117	50	—	A Gasssss
1971	"Take Me Girl, I'm Ready" b/w "Right On Brothers and Sisters"	50	18	16	Rainbow Funk
1971	"Way Back Home" b/w "Way Back Home" (Instrumental)	52	24	35	Rainbow Funk
1972	"Walk in the Night" b/w "I Don't Want to Do Wrong"	46	10	16	Moody Jr.
1972	"Groove Thang" b/w "Me and My Family"	—	—	—	Moody Jr.
1973	"Gimme That Beat (Part 1)" b/w "Gimme That Beat (Part 2)"	101	50	—	Peace & Understanding Is Hard to Find
1973	"I Don't Need No Reason" b/w "Country Boy"	—	—	—	Peace & Understanding Is Hard to Find
1973	"Peace and Understanding (Is Hard to Find)" b/w "Soul Clappin'"	—	—	—	Peace & Understanding Is Hard to Find
1974	"Dancin' Like They Do on Soul Train" b/w "I Ain't That Easy to Lose"	—	—	—	Jr. Walker & the All Stars
1976	"I'm So Glad" b/w "Soul Clappin'" (from Peace & Understanding Is Hard to Find)	—	—	—	Hot Shot
1976	"You Ain't No Ordinary Woman" b/w "Hot Shot"	—	—	—	Hot Shot
1977	"Hard Love" b/w "Whopper Bopper Show Stopper" (from Whopper Bopper Show Stopper)	—	—	—	Smooth
1979	"Wishing on a Star" b/w "Back Street Boogie"	—	89	—	Back Street Boogie
1979	"Back Street Boogie" b/w "Don't Let Me Go Astray"	—	—	—	Back Street Boogie
1983	"Blow the House Down" b/w "Ball Baby"	—	—	—	Blow the House Down
"—" denotes releases that did not chart or were not released in that territory.

== See also ==
- List of Motown Records artists
- List of soul musicians
- List of people from Arkansas
