= Breaking All the Rules (Peter Frampton album) =

Studio album by Peter Frampton
- Released: 14 May 1981
- Recorded: November 1979 – June 1980
- Studio: The Charlie Chaplin Sound Stage at A&M Studios (Los Angeles)
- Genre: Rock
- Length: 42:19
- Label: A&M
- Producer: David Kershenbaum and Peter Frampton

Peter Frampton chronology
Where I Should Be (1979)	Breaking All the Rules (1981)	The Art of Control (1982)

Professional ratings
Review scores
Source	Rating
AllMusic	3/5 stars
The Encyclopedia of Popular Music	2/5 stars
The Rolling Stone Album Guide	1/5 stars

Breaking All the Rules is the seventh studio album by English musician Peter Frampton, released on 14 May 1981 by A&M Records.

== Background ==
Breaking All the Rules featured a raw live in the studio approach like its 1980 predecessor Rise Up, which was a Brazilian LP release to promote Peter Frampton's concert tour in Brazil in 1980. Rise Up in fact served as a proto-version of Breaking All the Rules, as the latter album features re-recordings of nearly all tracks on Rise Up, including its title track, which features an almost entirely different lineup of musicians; only Frampton and bassist John Regan appeared on both versions of "Rise Up". Curiously, the Brazilian version of Breaking All the Rules, while lacking the re-recorded versions save for the title track, features three songs not included anywhere else (a cover of "Somebody's Been Sleeping" and two originals, "Night Town" and the instrumental "Los Anõs Locos") and totally different sequencing.

The album had won airplay for its anthemic title track, which was co-written with Procol Harum lyricist Keith Reid. The album's cover was photographed at 350 W 23rd Street, Chelsea, New York City. The album features Steve Lukather and Jeff Porcaro of Toto.

== Track listing ==
All tracks written by Peter Frampton except where indicated.

1. "Dig What I Say" – 4:13
2. "I Don't Wanna Let You Go" – 4:22
3. "Rise Up" (Alessi Brothers) – 3:46
4. "Wasting the Night Away" – 4:13
5. "Going to L.A." – 6:05
6. "You Kill Me" – 4:18
7. "Friday on My Mind" (George Young, Harry Vanda) – 4:18
8. "Lost a Part of You" – 3:43
9. "Breaking All the Rules" (Frampton, Keith Reid) – 7:17

== Charts ==
Chart (1981)	Peak position
Australian Kent Music Report Albums Chart	89

== Personnel ==
- Peter Frampton – guitars, guitar synthesizer keyboards, vocals
- Steve Lukather – guitars & backing vocals
- John Regan – bass guitar
- Arthur Stead – piano, synthesizer, electric piano, organ, Fender Rhodes & backing vocals
- Jeff Porcaro – drums, percussion
- Ed Monteleone - guitar on "Friday On My Mind"
