= Premonition (Peter Frampton album) =

Studio album by Peter Frampton
- Released: 27 January 1986
- Recorded: 1984–1985
- Studio: New River Studios (Fort Lauderdale, Florida)
- Genre: Pop rock
- Length: 42:05
- Label: Virgin (UK); Atlantic (US)
- Producer: Peter Frampton; Peter Solley

Peter Frampton chronology
The Art of Control (1982)	Premonition (1986)	When All the Pieces Fit (1989)

Professional ratings
Review scores
Source	Rating
AllMusic	2/5 stars
The Encyclopedia of Popular Music	1/5 stars
Kerrang!	2.5/5 stars

Premonition is the ninth studio album by the English musician Peter Frampton, released on 27 January 1986 by Virgin Records, four years after Frampton's previous studio album The Art of Control (1982). This album featured Frampton's hit from the 1980s, "Lying" and the single "All Eyes on You".

== Track listing ==
No.	Title	Writer(s)	Length
1.	"Stop"	Peter Frampton; Mark Goldenberg	4:52
2.	"Hiding from a Heartache"	Frampton; Steve Broughton Lunt; Arthur Stead	4:57
3.	"You Know So Well"	Frampton	3:43
4.	"Premonition"	Frampton; Rob Sabino	4:43
5.	"Lying"	Frampton	4:13
6.	"Moving a Mountain"	Frampton; Lunt; Mark Goldenberg	5:03
7.	"All Eyes on You"	Frampton	4:13
8.	"Into View"	Frampton	4:42
9.	"Call of the Wild"	Frampton; Lunt	5:44

2015 expanded and remastered edition bonus tracks
No.	Title	Length
10.	"So Far Away"	4:00
11.	"Nothing At All"	4:14
Total length:		50:19

== Personnel ==
- Peter Frampton – guitar, vocals; Yamaha CS-80 synthesizer and bass (tracks 1 and 5)
- Tony Levin – bass, Chapman Stick (track 9)
- Richard Cottle – keyboards
- Omar Hakim – drums (tracks 1 and 6)
- Steve Ferrone – drums (tracks 2–5, 7, 8)
- Chuck Kirkpatrick, Johnne Sambataro – backing vocals
- Peter Solley – piano (track 1)
- Richie Puente – percussion (tracks 2 and 7)
