= Now (Peter Frampton album) =

Studio album by Peter Frampton
- Released: August 26, 2003
- Genre: Rock
- Label: 33rd Street Records
- Producer: Peter Frampton

Peter Frampton chronology
Frampton Comes Alive! II (1995)	Now (2003)	Fingerprints (2006)

Professional ratings
Review scores
Source	Rating
Allmusic	2.5/5 stars
The Encyclopedia of Popular Music	3/5 stars

Now is the 12th studio album released by Peter Frampton through 33rd Street Records.

== Track listings ==
No.	Title	Writer(s)	Length
1.	"Verge of a Thing"	Peter Frampton, Gordon Kennedy	2:51
2.	"Flying Without Wings"	Frampton, Kennedy	4:08
3.	"Love Stands Alone"	Frampton, Kennedy, Bob Mayo	4:12
4.	"Not Forgotten"	Frampton, Kennedy	2:50
5.	"Hour of Need"	Frampton, Kennedy, Wayne Kirkpatrick	5:21
6.	"Mia Rose"	Frampton, Kimmie Rhodes	4:46
7.	"I'm Back"	Frampton, Kennedy	3:31
8.	"I Need Ground"	Frampton, Kennedy	3:44
9.	"While My Guitar Gently Weeps"	George Harrison	6:54
10.	"Greens"	Frampton, Mayo	5:59
11.	"Above It All"	Frampton, Kennedy, Kirkpatrick	3:34

== Personnel ==
- Peter Frampton – guitar, vocals, engineer, mixing, production
- Bob Mayo – keyboards, guitar, backing vocals
- John Regan – bass
- Chad Cromwell – drums, percussion

Additional musicians

- Don Fields – acoustic guitar on (9)
- Gordon Kennedy – guitar on (1, 7, 8), backing vocals on (3, 5, 7, 8, 11)
- Jed Leiber – keyboards on (10)
- Irene Revels, Lana Dallas, Reggie Calloway – backing vocals on (2)
- Kimmie Rhodes – backing vocals on (6)
- Wayne Kirkpatrick – backing vocals on (11)
- Chris McHugh – tambourine on (11)
