= Thank You Mr. Churchill =

Studio album by Peter Frampton
- Released: April 27, 2010
- Genres: Hard rock, pomp rock
- Length: 55:46 min (64:23 min with bonus tracks)
- Labels: New Door Records; Eagle Rock
- Producers: Chris Kimsey, Peter Frampton

Peter Frampton chronology
| Fingerprints (2006) | Thank You Mr. Churchill (2010) | Hummingbird in a Box (2014) |

Professional ratings
Review scores
| Source | Rating |
|---|---|
| Allmusic | 3.5/5 stars |

Thank You Mr. Churchill is the fourteenth studio album from Peter Frampton, released through New Door Records in North America and through Eagle Rock in Europe.

== Reception ==
Since Thank You Mr. Churchill's release, the album has been met with mostly positive reviews from critics. William Clark of Guitar International wrote, "Without any exaggeration I can easily say that this mostly ignored album from 2010 contains some of the best music Peter Frampton has ever pushed out to date".

== Track listing ==
All tracks composed by Peter Frampton; except where indicated

1. "Thank You Mr. Churchill" (Frampton, John Regan) - 4:55
2. "Solution" (Frampton, Gordon Kennedy) - 3:49
3. "Road to the Sun" (featuring Smoking Gun with Julian Frampton) (Frampton, Julian Frampton) - 5:10
4. "I'm Due a You" (Frampton, Kennedy) - 5:00
5. "Vaudeville Nanna and the Banjolele" (Frampton, Kennedy) - 4:35
6. "Asleep at the Wheel" - 6:50
7. "Suite: Liberte. A. Megumi B. Huria Wat" - 7:28
8. "Restraint" (Frampton, Kennedy) - 3:42
9. "I Want it Back" - 4:38
10. "Invisible Man" (Frampton, Kennedy) - 4:51
11. "Black Ice" - 4:49
- Non North America edition
1. "I Understand" - 3:30 [Bonus Track]
2. "A Thousand Dreams" - 5:17 [Bonus Track]

== Personnel ==
- Peter Frampton - vocals, electric and acoustic guitar, bass guitar, dulcimer, E-bow, Wurlitzer, ukulele
- Eddie Willis, Gordon Kennedy - electric guitar
- Bob Babbitt, Craig Young - bass guitar
- Rob Jones - grand piano, synthesizer
- Chad Cromwell, Kenneth "Spider" Rice, Matt Cameron - drums
- Eric Darken, Matt Cameron - percussion
- Kira Small, Marcia Ware, Scat Springs - background vocals
- Julian Frampton - vocals on "Road to the Sun"
- Benmont Tench - Hammond organ on "Thank You Mr. Churchill"
- Don Gunn - engineer
