= Glenn Wexler =

American artist

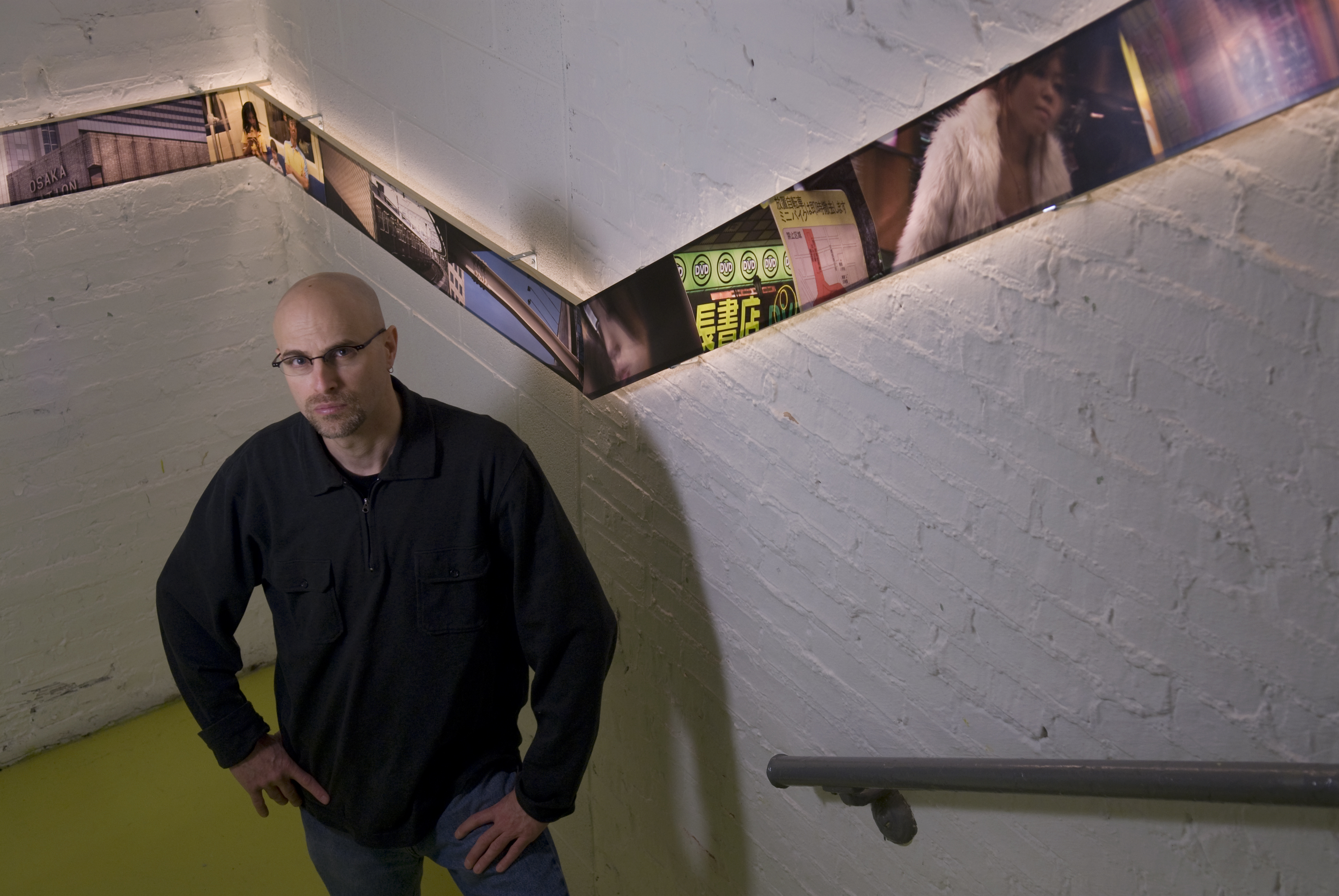
- Glenn Wexler with Transit II
- Born: August 30, 1963 (age 62)
- Known for: Contemporary artist

Glenn Thomas Walksler (born 1963) is an American contemporary artist based in Chicago. He is known primarily for works involving silkscreen printing and photographic site-specific installations. Travels through urban environments in Japan and Thailand have influenced his subject matter and themes.

== History ==
Glenn Wexler was born in Chicago and grew up in the west-side Austin neighborhood and Oak Park, Illinois. In the late 1980s he began pursuing a career in graphic and visual arts. His first studio was a live/work space in the Wicker Park, Chicago neighborhood on the near northwest side. In what was then mainly an artist community, he became very active producing screen-printed works and exhibiting frequently. By the early 1990s he became part of a group of artists associated with events and venues in and around the areas Flat Iron and Tower buildings.

It was during that time, Wexler met renowned artist Ed Paschke, of the Chicago Imagists, and they soon became friends. Conversing and working with Paschke in his far north side studio, Wexler learned much about the art world and was profoundly influenced to continue developing as an artist.

== Early work ==
Inspired by the likes of Robert Rauschenberg and Andy Warhol, Wexler's early work involved screen-printing, painting and image appropriation. He drew source material from magazines, catalogs and newspapers mainly published in Japan and Hong Kong. The images were made into silk screens, and then printed onto paper, canvas, steel, glass, as well as found objects and other unconventional surfaces. The results were often brightly colored, graphics-inspired works reminiscent of 1960s-era Pop Art.

By the mid-to late 1990s, after exhibiting in and visiting several cities throughout Europe and Asia, Wexler's work changed. He developed an interest in the urban setting, specifically, the relationship between architectural design and nature. He largely abandoned painting, focusing more on photography, printmaking, fabrication, and installation.

== Early Installation ==
A pivotal work was Haven (2001–02) a multi-space installation project in which Wexler affixed cut vinyl images of a shell—a haven within nature—to discreet locations inside of 25 Chicago area galleries and art centers. (A few remain.) Seeking a dialogue with each site, Haven was Wexler's first foray into environmental art.

== Contemporary Artwork ==
Transit a series of site-specific installations, uses lighting and backlit photographs—shot in and around the transit systems of Tokyo, Osaka and Bangkok—to create a continuous though disjunctive cinematic narrative. These installations take a different shape and length at each location, engaging the space of the interior architecture. Imagery includes signage, lighting, shrines, people, and plant life, some blurred—shot while in motion, and others while stationary, as if momentarily arrested.

According to the artist, "I have mainly been interested in the existence or placement of nature within the proximity of architecture and the co-existence of the traditional and the contemporary. By connecting several photographs together I’m attempting to recreate personal journeys and passing moments in a city."

== Exhibitions ==
Wexler has exhibited his work at many venues including:

- Art Fiera, Bologna, Italy
- Bridgewater/Lustberg Gallery, New York
- Chicago Cultural Center
- Galerie Bernsteinzimmer, Nuremberg, Germany Aktuelles Programm
- H Gallery, Bangkok, Thailand
- Hyde Park Art Center, Chicago Hyde Park Art Center : Exhibitions : Glenn Wexler: Transit 2
- Marwen Foundation, Chicago
- Museum of Contemporary Art, Chicago
- Rockford Art Museum, Rockford, Illinois
- Union League Club of Chicago
- Zolla/Lieberman Gallery, Chicago Glenn Wexler
