= Bob Mayo =

Background information
- Also known as: Bob Mayo, Bobby Mayo
- Born: Robert Mayo; August 25, 1951; New York City, USA
- Died: February 23, 2004 (aged 52) Basel, Switzerland
- Occupation: Musician
- Instruments: Keyboards; guitar; vocals
- Years active: 1960s–2004
- Formerly of: Peter Frampton, Hall & Oates, Foreigner, Robert Plant, Dan Fogelberg, Aerosmith, Joe Walsh, Joe Vitale, Procol Harum, The Renovators Doc Holliday, Rat Race Choir, Renegade, Ramble and the Descendants

Robert J. Mayo (August 25, 1951 – February 23, 2004) was an American session keyboardist and guitarist, perhaps best known for his work with Peter Frampton.

== Biography ==
Mayo was born in New York City, and grew up in Westchester County. He began studying music at the age of five, focusing on classical piano. During the 1960s, Mayo's interest in music grew due to the rock explosion. His first band was called Ramble and the Descendants, in which he played organ and sang. Mayo played with several other local bands and had plans to attend the Juilliard School in New York City.

In 1971, Mayo formed Doc Holliday with Frank Carillo, Tom Arlotta, and Bob Liggio. He then joined Rat Race Choir (1973–74), playing guitar. He then left RRC, was replaced with Mark Hitt and teamed up with Peter Frampton and joined his touring band. Because of this, he appeared on Frampton's album Frampton Comes Alive!. It was on this recording, following Mayo's Fender Rhodes electric piano solo on the song "Do You Feel Like We Do", that Frampton introduced him with the words "Bob Mayo on the keyboards... Bob Mayo!" Mayo also appeared on the Frampton albums I'm in You and Where I Should Be.

In 1980, Mayo left Frampton's band to focus on recording. During this time, he recorded with Joe Walsh and Joe Vitale. Later he joined the touring band for Foreigner and played keyboards on "Waiting for a Girl Like You" and "Break It Up". He spent the next two years touring with Foreigner, and also toured with Dan Fogelberg and Hall & Oates in the late 1980s. He continued to tour with Hall & Oates until 1998.

In 1981, Mayo was asked by Joey Kramer of Aerosmith to play keyboards in his band Renegade, fronted by vocalist Marge Raymond. In 1983, Mayo played keyboards on Aerosmith's first tour in three years, in support of their Rock in a Hard Place album, also adding background vocals. Also in 1983, Mayo played in Robert Plant's touring band for The Principle of Moments world tour. The 2007 Rhino re-issue of The Principle of Moments contains three live tracks from that tour.

In 1992, Mayo returned to work with Peter Frampton. The resulting tour turned into the recording of the album "Frampton Comes Alive II". He also appeared on the Live in Detroit CD & DVD as well as Frampton's 2003 recording Now.

On February 23, 2004, Mayo was touring with Frampton in Basel, Switzerland, when he had a heart attack and died. Frampton said regarding him, "Bob was like a brother to me. I have lost a close personal friend and a talented, professional and outstanding musician."

== Discography ==
=== Peter Frampton ===
- Frampton Comes Alive! (1976)
- I'm in You (1977)
- Where I Should Be (1979)
- Rise Up (1980)
- Peter Frampton (1994)
- Frampton Comes Alive! II (1995)
- Live in Detroit (2000)
- Now (2003)
- Live in San Francisco March 24, 1975 (2004)

=== Foreigner ===
- 4 (1981)
- Agent Provocateur (1984)

=== Joe Walsh ===
- There Goes the Neighborhood (1981)

=== Joe Vitale ===
- Plantation Harbor (1981)

=== Robert Plant ===
- The Principle of Moments (1983) (2007 reissue)

=== Daryl Hall and John Oates ===
- Change of Season (1990)

=== Robin Trower ===
- In the Line of Fire (1990)

=== Procol Harum ===
- The Prodigal Stranger (1991) (lead guitar on unreleased track "Into the Flood")

=== Annie and the Natural Wonder Band ===
- Going on Safari (1990) (piano, synth, hand claps, screams, happiness
- Every Day is Earth Day (1991) (piano, snyth, accordion, joy, maestro magnifico)
- Whales and Tales (1992) (piano, synth, organ)
- Totally Bugged Out (1993) (piano, organ, vocal)
