= Where I Should Be =

1979 studio album by Peter Frampton

Studio album by Peter Frampton
- Released: 30 May 1979
- Recorded: November 1978 – May 1979
- Studios: The Record Plant, New York City
- Genres: Rock, pop
- Length: 41:04
- Label: A&M
- Producer: Peter Frampton

Peter Frampton chronology
| I'm in You (1977) | Where I Should Be (1979) | Breaking All the Rules (1981) |

Professional ratings
Review scores
| Source | Rating |
|---|---|
| AllMusic | 3/5 stars |
| The Encyclopedia of Popular Music | 2/5 stars |
| Music Week | Unfavorable |
| The Rolling Stone Album Guide | 1/5 stars |

Where I Should Be is the sixth studio album by English musician and songwriter Peter Frampton, released on 30 May 1979 by A&M Records. The album was certified Gold by the RIAA on 3 July 1979.

== Background ==
Released in May 1979, Where I Should Be achieved Gold status and yielded the hit "I Can't Stand It No More", which peaked at number 14 on the US Billboard Hot 100.

== Track listing ==
All tracks are written by Peter Frampton, except where noted.

| No. | Title | Writer(s) | Length |
|---|---|---|---|
| 1. | "I Can't Stand It No More" | | 4:14 |
| 2. | "Got My Feet Back on the Ground" | Frampton, Rodney Eckerman | 3:57 |
| 3. | "Where I Should Be (Monkey's Song)" | | 4:30 |
| 4. | "Everything I Need" | Frampton, Bob Mayo | 5:13 |
| 5. | "May I Baby" | Isaac Hayes, David Porter | 3:37 |
| 6. | "You Don't Know Like I Know" | Hayes, Porter | 3:15 |
| 7. | "She Don't Reply" | | 3:39 |
| 8. | "We've Just Begun" | Frampton, Mayo | 5:26 |
| 9. | "Take Me by the Hand" | | 4:13 |
| 10. | "It's a Sad Affair" | | 4:20 |

== Personnel ==
The lineup on this album was varied and did not consist solely of the previous Peter Frampton band.

=== Artist ===
- Peter Frampton - guitar, keyboards, vocals

=== Additional personnel ===
- Steve Cropper - guitar
- Bob Mayo - grand piano, electric piano, organ
- Donald Dunn, Stanley Sheldon, Eddie N. Watkins, Jr. - bass guitar
- Tower of Power - horns
- Gary Mallaber, Jamie Oldaker - drums
- Steve Forman - percussion

== Charts ==
Album

| Year | Chart | Position |
|---|---|---|
| 1979 | US Pop Albums | 19 |
| 1979 | Australian Kent Music Report Albums Chart | 35 |

Single

| Year | Single | Chart | Position |
|---|---|---|---|
| 1979 | "I Can't Stand It No More" | U.S. Billboard Hot 100 | 14 |
| 1979 | "I Can't Stand It No More" | Canada RPM Top Singles | 15 |

== Certifications ==
| Region | Certification | Certified units/sales |
|---|---|---|
| Canada (Music Canada) | Gold | 50,000^{^} |
| United States (RIAA) | Gold | 500,000^{^} |
^{^} Shipments figures based on certification alone.
