= Stanley Sheldon =

American bass guitar player (born 1950)

- Born: Stanley Sheldon; September 19, 1950 (age 75); Ottawa, Kansas, United States
- Genres: Hard rock, blues rock, folk rock, country music, world music, jazz
- Occupations: Musician, songwriter
- Instruments: Bass guitar, guitar

Stanley Sheldon (born September 19, 1950) is an American bass guitar player best known for his work with Peter Frampton. He is notable as an early adopter of the fretless bass for rock music.

Sheldon was born in 1950 in Ottawa, Kansas where he joined his first band, The Lost Souls. His first recorded work with Frampton was the wildly successful live album Frampton Comes Alive! in 1976. He played on subsequent Frampton albums, I'm in You (1977) and Where I Should Be (1979). In 2007, he contributed as co-writer and bass player on Frampton's 2007 Grammy winning instrumental album Fingerprints and toured as a member of Frampton's band until 2017.

Sheldon also recorded with his late friend Tommy Bolin on Teaser and performs on various Bolin archival releases. Other recorded works include Lou Gramm Ready or Not, and Ronin (1980), a co-assembled group of session musicians featuring Sheldon, Waddy Wachtel, Rick Marotta, and Dan Dugmore. Sheldon toured with Warren Zevon on Zevon's 1978 Excitable Boy tour and did recording work for the Christian music songwriter David Ruis. He co-produced and played on the Mayhew Family album Songs from the Third Floor (2004) and EP Watch Out (2009). In 2008, he toured as the bassist for the Delbert McClinton band. Sheldon has also performed on Hollywood movie soundtracks, most notably the Cheech and Chong comedy Up in Smoke.

Sheldon devoted most of the '90s to Latin American Studies at the University of Kansas, earning a master's degree. During this period, he travelled widely throughout Latin America with his studies focused on slave society of the nineteenth century in Latin American countries and how its influence on past music continues to affect the transformation and hybridization of world music today. During this time, Sheldon played with various versions of a band that played "son" and "salsa," often to sizable dance crowds.

Sheldon has a passion for teaching and, when not touring, he has offered bass lessons for students of all ages at Blues to Bach Music Center in Shawnee, Kansas.

In 2019, he reunited with the original members of Ronin for a tour of Japan.
