= Fingerprints (Peter Frampton album) =

Studio album by Peter Frampton
- Released: September 12, 2006
- Recorded: 2006
- Studio: Muchmore Studio (Cincinnati, Ohio); British Grove Studios (London) (Track 5); Robert Lang Studios (Seattle, WA) (Tracks 3 and 12); Eden Studios (London) (Track 8); OGM Studios and Jorgensounds (Nashville, TN) (Track 14)
- Genre: Instrumental rock; blues; jazz
- Length: 55:37
- Label: A&M, Polydor
- Producer: Peter Frampton, Gordon Kennedy

Peter Frampton chronology
Now (2003)	Fingerprints (2006)	Thank You Mr. Churchill (2010)

Fingerprints, released in 2006, is Peter Frampton's 13th studio album and first instrumental album, and features guest appearances from friends and musical acquaintances, as well as Frampton's signature effect, the talkbox. It was his first album on A&M Records in 24 years.

Fingerprints won the Grammy Award for Best Pop Instrumental Album at the 49th Annual Grammy Awards in 2007.

== Track listing ==
All tracks composed by Peter Frampton and Gordon Kennedy; except where noted.

1. "Boot It Up" (Frampton, John Regan) (featuring Courtney Pine) – 3:27
2. "Ida y Vuelta (Out and Back)" (Frampton, Shawn Fichter, Stanley Sheldon) – 3:23
3. "Black Hole Sun" (Chris Cornell) – 5:25
4. "Float" – 4:03
5. "My Cup of Tea" (Hank Marvin, Brian Bennett, Kennedy, Frampton) – 4:52
6. "Shewango Way" – 3:19
7. "Blooze" (Frampton) – 5:14
8. "Cornerstones" (Charlie Watts, Bill Wyman, Chris Stainton, Frampton) – 3:13
9. "Grab a Chicken (Put It Back)" – 3:53
10. "Double Nickels" – 3:48
11. "Smoky" (Frampton) – 4:51
12. "Blowin' Smoke" (Matt Cameron, Mike McCready, Gary Westlake, Frampton) – 3:47
13. "Oh When..." (Frampton) – 1:19
14. "Souvenirs de Nos Pères (Memories of Our Fathers)" (John Jorgenson) – 4:56

== Personnel ==
- Peter Frampton – acoustic, electric and rhythm guitar, E-Bow
- Mike McCready – electric guitar (3, 12)
- Gordon Kennedy – electric guitar (4, 6, 9); acoustic guitar (5, 9, 10)
- Hank Marvin – electric guitar (5)
- Warren Haynes – electric guitar (7)
- John Jorgenson – lead & rhythm guitar (14)
- Paul Franklin – pedal steel guitar (10)
- John Regan – bass (1, 4, 6, 7, 9, 10); electric upright double bass (11)
- Stanley Sheldon – fretless bass (2)
- Gary Westlake – bass (3, 12)
- Mark Griffiths – bass (5)
- Bill Wyman – bass (8)
- Charlie Chadwick – acoustic bass (14)
- Arthur Stead – keyboards (1); grand piano (7, 11)
- Blair Masters – keyboards (5); cello sample (12)
- Gustavo Ramirez – grand piano (2)
- Chris Stainton – grand piano, Hammond B-3 organ (8)
- Mark Harris – Hammond B-3 organ (11)
- John Burton – Pro-Tools
- Courtney Pine – tenor saxophone (1)
- Chad Cromwell – drums (1, 7, 9, 10)
- Shawn Fichter – drums (2, 4, 6, 11)
- Matt Cameron – drums (3, 12)
- Brian Bennett – drums (5)
- Charlie Watts – drums (8)
- Stephan Dudash – 5-string viola (14)
- Aaron Swihart – Internet Cooking Programs
- Daniel de los Reyes – percussion (2)
- Gary L Cales II – DAW Chief Technical Engineer
