= When All the Pieces Fit =

Studio album by Peter Frampton
- Released: October 1989
- Studio: Ocean Way (Los Angeles)
- Genre: Rock
- Length: 46:44
- Label: Atlantic
- Producer: Peter Frampton, Chris Lord-Alge

Peter Frampton chronology
Premonition (1986)	When All the Pieces Fit (1989)	Peter Frampton (1994)

Professional ratings
Review scores
Source	Rating
AllMusic	2/5 stars
The Encyclopedia of Popular Music	2/5 stars

When All the Pieces Fit is the tenth studio release by the English musician Peter Frampton and the follow-up to his Premonition album from 1986.

== Track listing ==
No.	Title	Writer(s)	Length
1.	"More Ways Than One"	Frampton, Danny Wilde	5:31
2.	"Holding On to You"	Frampton, Will Jennings	4:16
3.	"My Heart Goes Out to You"	Frampton, John Regan	5:06
4.	"Hold Tight"	Frampton	4:16
5.	"People All over the World"	Frampton, B.A. Robertson	5:27
6.	"Back to the Start"	Frampton, Danny Wilde	4:17
7.	"Mind over Matter"	Frampton	4:56
8.	"Now and Again"	Frampton, John Regan, B.A. Robertson	4:47
9.	"Hard Earned Love"	Frampton, Jon Dworkow, Danny Wilde	4:23
10.	"This Time Around"	Frampton, Will Jennings, John Regan	3:53

== Personnel ==
- Peter Frampton - vocals, guitar, bass guitar, bass synthesizer, synthesizer, sequencer, drum programming
- Nathan East - bass (tracks 2,3,5)
- John Regan - bass guitar (track 8)
- Chris Lord-Alge - synthesizer (tracks 2 and 8)
- John Robinson - drums (tracks 1,6,8,9), Steve Ferrone - drums (tracks 3–5,7,10)
- Lenny Castro - percussion (tracks 2–5,8)
- Rick Wills, Jean McClain, Mark Williamson, Alfie Silas, Danny Wilde, B.A. Robertson - backing vocals
- Sam Riney - tenor saxophone (track 10)

== Production ==
- Chris Lord-Alge - engineering, mixing, production
- Richard Landers - engineering
- Clark Jermain, David Scott, Guy Charbonneau, Jim Dineen, Julie Last, Steve Holroyd - assistant engineers
- Bob Ludwig - mastering
- Leo Posillico - cover painting
- Greg Gorman - photography
