= Peter Frampton (album) =

Studio album by Peter Frampton
- Released: 1994
- Studio: Claray Sound; Nuages Recording; O'Henry Sound Studios (Burbank); Image Recording (Los Angeles); Le Mobile
- Genre: Rock
- Length: 57:03 (original release)
- Label: Relativity (original release) Legacy (re-release)
- Producer: Kevin Savigar, Peter Frampton

Peter Frampton chronology
When All the Pieces Fit (1989)	Peter Frampton (1994)	Frampton Comes Alive! II (1995)

Professional ratings
Review scores
Source	Rating
AllMusic	3.5/5 stars
The Encyclopedia of Popular Music	3/5 stars

Peter Frampton is the eleventh studio album by English singer-songwriter Peter Frampton. Released in 1994, the album, along with three unreleased tracks from 1992's compilation album, Shine On - A Collection, were the artist's only studio releases of the 1990s. The album also features one of the last recordings made by Frampton's former bandmate Steve Marriott on "Out of the Blue". An expanded version of the album was issued in 2000. The song "You Can Be Sure" received frequent airplay on some Anglo FM radios in Argentina.

== Track listing ==
All songs written by Peter Frampton and Kevin Savigar; except where noted.

1. "Day in the Sun" (4:27)
2. "You Can Be Sure" (4:27)
3. "It All Comes Down to You" (6:23)
4. "You" (5:08)
5. "Can't Take That Away" (Jonathan Cain, Peter Frampton) (5:50)
6. "Young Island" (Peter Frampton) (1:39)
7. "Off The Hook" (3:05)
8. "Waiting For Your Love" (5:41)
9. "So Hard to Believe" (John Regan, Peter Frampton) (5:14)
10. "Out of the Blue" (Peter Frampton, Steve Marriott) (4:24)
11. "Shelter Through The Night" (4:27)
12. "Changing All The Time" (6:19)
- 2000 re-issue
1. "You Can Be Sure" (Live Acoustic)*
2. "Baby I Love Your Way" (Live Acoustic)* (Peter Frampton)
3. "All I Want to Be (Is By Your Side)" (Live Acoustic)* (Peter Frampton)
4. "Show Me the Way" (Live Acoustic)* (Peter Frampton)
- * Not included on the original 1994 release, but included as a Bonus Track on the expanded 2000 re-issue; all bonus tracks previously unreleased in the U.S.

== Personnel ==
- Peter Frampton – vocals, guitar, bass, keyboards
- Lee Sklar – bass (tracks 5, 7)
- John Regan – bass (track 11)
- Kevin Savigar – keyboards; vocals on "So Hard to Believe"
- Denny Fongheiser – drums (tracks 1, 7, 9, 11)
- John Robinson – drums (tracks 1–5, 8, 10)
- Steve Marriott – vocals on "Out of the Blue"
- Jonathan Cain – electric piano on "Can't Take That Away"
- Chris Lord-Alge – mixing
