= Peter Frampton =

English musician (born 1950)

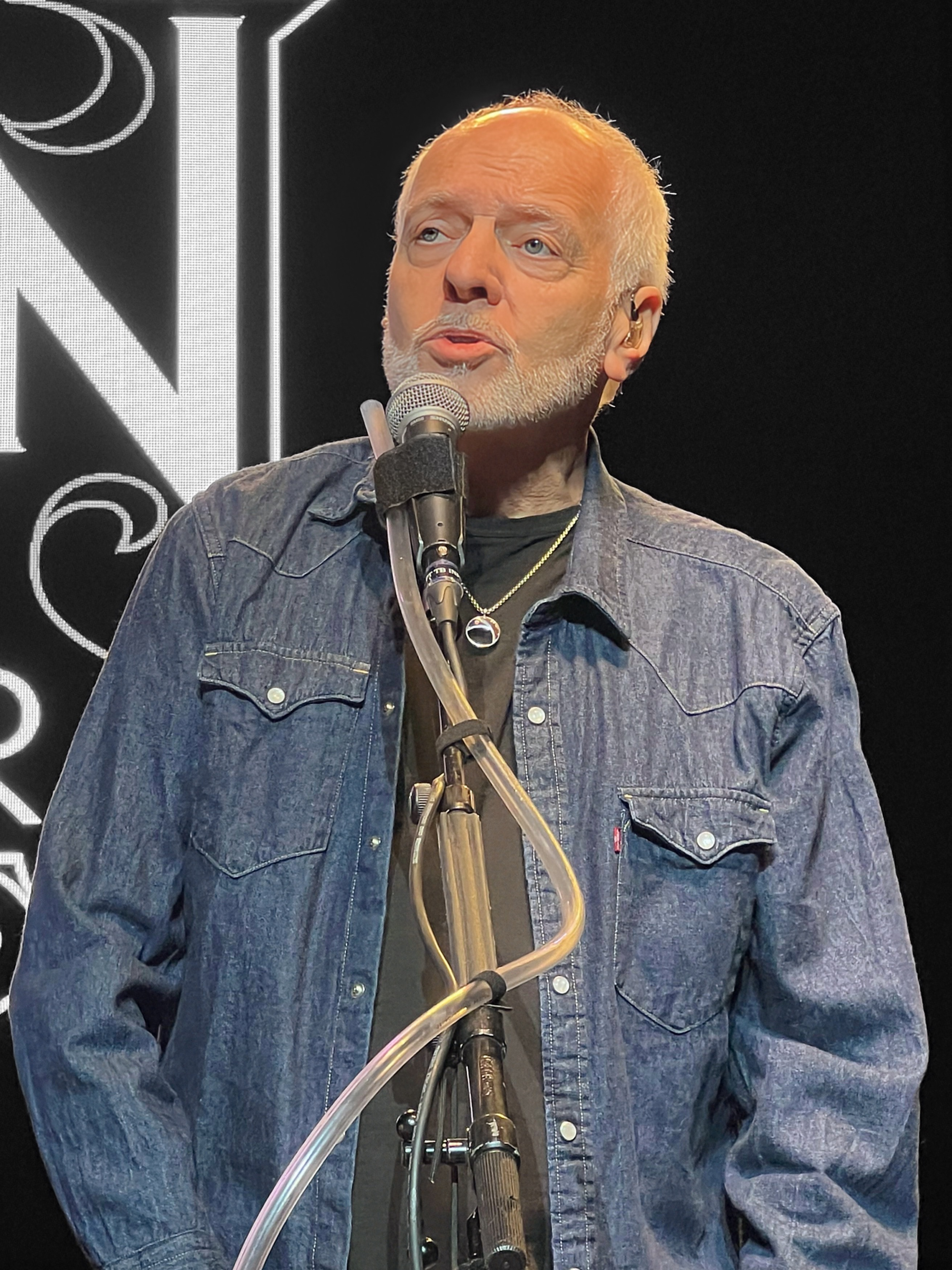
- Frampton in 2024

Background information
- Born: Peter Kenneth Frampton; 22 April 1950 (age 76); Beckenham, Kent, England
- Genre: Rock
- Occupations: Musician; singer; songwriter
- Instruments: Guitar; vocals; piano
- Works: Discography
- Years active: 1966–present
- Labels: A&M; Virgin; Atlantic; 33rd Street
- Formerly of: Humble Pie; The Herd; Ringo Starr & His All-Starr Band
- Website: www.frampton.com

External videos
- Oral History, Peter Frampton talks about how the Frampton amp switcher came about out of necessity, and the development of the Frampton talk box followed. Interview date July 23, 2004, NAMM (National Association of Music Merchants) Oral History Library

Peter Kenneth Frampton (born 22 April 1950) is an English musician who rose to prominence as a member of the rock bands The Herd and Humble Pie. Later in his career, Frampton found significant success as a solo artist. He has released several albums, including his breakthrough album, the live recording Frampton Comes Alive! (1976), which was the bestselling album of 1976 in the United States, spawning several hit singles and has been certified 8× Platinum by the RIAA in the United States. He has also worked with various other acts such as Ringo Starr, John Entwistle of the Who, David Bowie, Joe Bonamassa, and both Matt Cameron and Mike McCready of Pearl Jam.

Frampton is known for his signature hit songs "Show Me the Way", "Baby, I Love Your Way", "Do You Feel Like We Do", and "I'm in You", all of which remain staples of classic rock radio. He has also appeared as himself in television shows such as The Simpsons, Family Guy, and Madam Secretary. Frampton was inducted into the Rock and Roll Hall of Fame in 2024.

== Early life ==
Peter Kenneth Frampton was born to Owen Frampton and Peggy (née ffitch) Frampton in Beckenham, Kent. He attended Bromley Technical High School, at which his father was a teacher and the head of the Art department. He first became interested in music when he was seven years old. Having discovered his grandmother's banjolele in the attic, he taught himself to play it, going on to later teach himself to play guitar and piano as well. At the age of eight, he began taking classical music lessons.

Frampton was influenced by late 1950s and early 1960s rock acts such as Cliff Richard and the Shadows, Buddy Holly, Eddie Cochran and later the Ventures, Jimi Hendrix and the Beatles. His father introduced him to the recordings of the gypsy jazz guitarist Django Reinhardt.

== Music career ==
=== Early career ===
By the age of 12, Frampton played in a band, the Little Ravens. Both he and David Bowie, who was three years older, were pupils at the aforementioned Bromley Technical High School, where Frampton's father was Bowie's art teacher. The Little Ravens played on the same bill at school as George and the Dragons, Bowie's band. Frampton and Bowie spent lunch breaks together, playing Buddy Holly songs.

At age 14, Peter was playing in the band the Trubeats followed by another band the Preachers, who later became Moon's Train, produced and managed by Bill Wyman of the Rolling Stones. Frampton's parents were, at the time, concerned about their son playing regular late night gigs whilst still in school, so Alex Brown, a member of the Preachers, was designated to meet his parents at their house, along with his son Steven, to show that the band members were responsible people. After this meeting, Frampton was allowed to join the band.

Frampton became a successful child singer, and in 1966 he became a member of freakbeat group the Herd. He was the lead guitarist and singer, scoring several British pop hits. Frampton was named "The Face of 1968" by teen magazine Rave.

In 1969, when Frampton was 18 years old, he joined Steve Marriott from the band Small Faces to form Humble Pie.

While playing with Humble Pie, Frampton also did session recording with other artists, including George Harrison, Harry Nilsson, Jerry Lee Lewis, and John Entwistle (on Whistle Rymes in 1972). During a recording session with George Harrison at Abbey Road Studios in London in 1970, Pete Drake introduced him to the "talk box" that was to become one of his trademark guitar effects.

=== Solo career ===
After four studio albums and one live album with Humble Pie, Frampton left the band and went solo in 1971, just in time to see Rockin' the Fillmore rise up the US charts. He remained with Dee Anthony (1926–2009), the same personal manager that Humble Pie had used.

Frampton's own debut was 1972's Wind of Change, with guest artists Ringo Starr and Billy Preston. This album was followed by Frampton's Camel in 1973, which featured Frampton working within a group project. In 1974, Frampton released Somethin's Happening. Frampton toured extensively to support his solo career, joined for three years by his former Herd mate Andy Bown on keyboards, Rick Wills on bass, and American drummer John Siomos. In 1975, the Frampton album was released. The album went to No. 32 in the US charts and is certified Gold by the RIAA.

Frampton had little commercial success with his early albums. This changed with his best-selling live album, Frampton Comes Alive!, in 1976, from which "Baby, I Love Your Way", "Show Me the Way", and an edited version of "Do You Feel Like We Do", were hit singles. The latter two tracks also featured his use of the talk box guitar effect. The album was recorded in 1975, mainly at the Winterland Ballroom in San Francisco, California, where Humble Pie had previously enjoyed a good following. Frampton had a new line-up, with Americans Bob Mayo on keyboards and rhythm guitar and Stanley Sheldon on bass. Wills had been sacked by Frampton at the end of 1974, and Bown had left on the eve of Frampton Comes Alive, to return to England and new fame with Status Quo. Frampton Comes Alive was released in early January, debuting on the charts on 14 February at number 191. The album was on the Billboard 200 for 97 weeks, of which 55 were in the top 40, of which 10 were at the top. The album was the third best selling album of 1976. The album won Frampton a Juno Award in 1977.

A tribute to the album's staying power, readers of Rolling Stone ranked Frampton Comes Alive No. 3 in a 2012 poll of all-time favourite live albums. The article's text stated, "He was loved by teenage girls, and their older brothers. He owned the year 1976 like nobody else in rock." The success of Frampton Comes Alive! put him on the cover of Rolling Stone, in a famous shirtless photo by Francesco Scavullo. Frampton later said he regrets the photo because it changed his image as a credible artist into a teen idol.

In late 1976, Frampton and manager Dee Anthony visited the White House at the invitation of Steven Ford, the president's son. On 24 August 1979, Frampton received a star on the Hollywood Walk of Fame at 6819 Hollywood Boulevard for his contributions to the recording industry.

=== Setbacks and decline in popularity ===
Frampton's following album, I'm in You (1977), contained the hit title single and went platinum, but fell well short of expectations compared to Frampton Comes Alive!. He starred, with the Bee Gees, in producer Robert Stigwood's poorly received film Sgt. Pepper's Lonely Hearts Club Band (1978). Frampton's career seemed to be falling as quickly as it had risen. He also played guitar on the title song of the 1978 film Grease, a song newly written for the film by Barry Gibb.

Frampton suffered a near-fatal car accident in the Bahamas in 1978 that marked the end of his prolific period and the beginning of a long period during which he was less successful. However, he returned to the studio in November 1978 to begin recording the album Where I Should Be. Among those contributing to the album were past band members Stanley Sheldon (bass), Bob Mayo (keyboards/guitar/vocals), and John Siomos (drums/vocals). Released in June 1979, the album was certified gold status by July. The single, "I Can't Stand It No More," reached No. 14 on the US chart. This was to be Frampton's last hit single.

In 1980, Frampton's album Rise Up was released to promote his tour in Brazil, although he suffered another serious setback that year when all his guitars were destroyed in a cargo plane crash that killed four people. Among the instruments he lost was the black Les Paul Custom which he had named "Phenix" (pictured on the cover of Frampton Comes Alive); it was given to him by Mark Mariana, was first used on the night of the recording of the Humble Pie live album Performance, and had been used all through his early solo career. As it turned out the guitar was saved from burning in the crash and sold to a musician; many years later it was recovered and returned to him, in December 2011. The album eventually turned into Breaking All the Rules, released the next year in 1981. These albums were the first he recorded almost completely live. In 1982, following the release of The Art of Control, Frampton tried unsuccessfully to split his ties with A&M Records; he re-signed with the label in 2006 and released his Grammy Award–winning Fingerprints.

=== Return ===
Although his albums generally met with little commercial success, Frampton continued to record throughout the 1980s. He achieved a brief, moderate comeback of sorts in 1986 with the release of his Premonition album, and the single "Lying", which became a hit on Mainstream Rock chart. Most notably, he also united with old friend David Bowie, and both worked together to make albums. Frampton played on Bowie's 1987 album Never Let Me Down and sang and played on the accompanying Glass Spider Tour. In 2013, he credited his participation in this tour for helping revive his career.

Looking for the band experience again after touring with Bowie, Frampton kept referencing Steve Marriott, and at the beginning of 1991 rejoined his old Humble Pie mate for some shows (Marriott's last English gigs) at the Half Moon in Putney, London. The chemistry was still there for a while, as both Frampton and Marriott laid down some tracks in L.A. and prepared to do a "Frampton-Marriott" tour. Marriott abruptly returned to England in April and he died in a house fire less than 24 hours after his return. Broken up by Marriott's death, Frampton went off the road for a time, then reformed his old touring band with his old friends Bob Mayo and John Regan. At least three songs, and possibly a fourth, from the ended Marriott-Frampton partnership were subsequently recorded; two ending up on Frampton's "Shine On" compilation, a third on his subsequent solo album.

In 1994, Frampton wrote and released the album Peter Frampton, the final version of which contained material recorded on Tascam cassette recorders. Originally released on the Relativity label, this record was re-released in 2000 by Legacy Records, with four bonus tracks and additional notes by Frampton.

In 1995, Frampton released Frampton Comes Alive! II, which contained live versions of many of the songs from his 1980s and 1990s solo albums. Frampton Comes Alive! II was recorded at The Fillmore Theater on 15 June 1995. Although there was a large amount of marketing for the album, it did not sell well. After Frampton Comes Alive! II, he recorded and toured with Bill Wyman's Rhythm Kings and Ringo Starr's All-Starr Band, where he and Jack Bruce performed a cover version of Cream's "Sunshine of Your Love".

In the late 1990s, Frampton starred in an infomercial plugging the eMedia Guitar Method, a piece of instructional software represented as an alternative to taking actual guitar lessons. He claimed in the infomercial that the software was the best way to learn guitar.

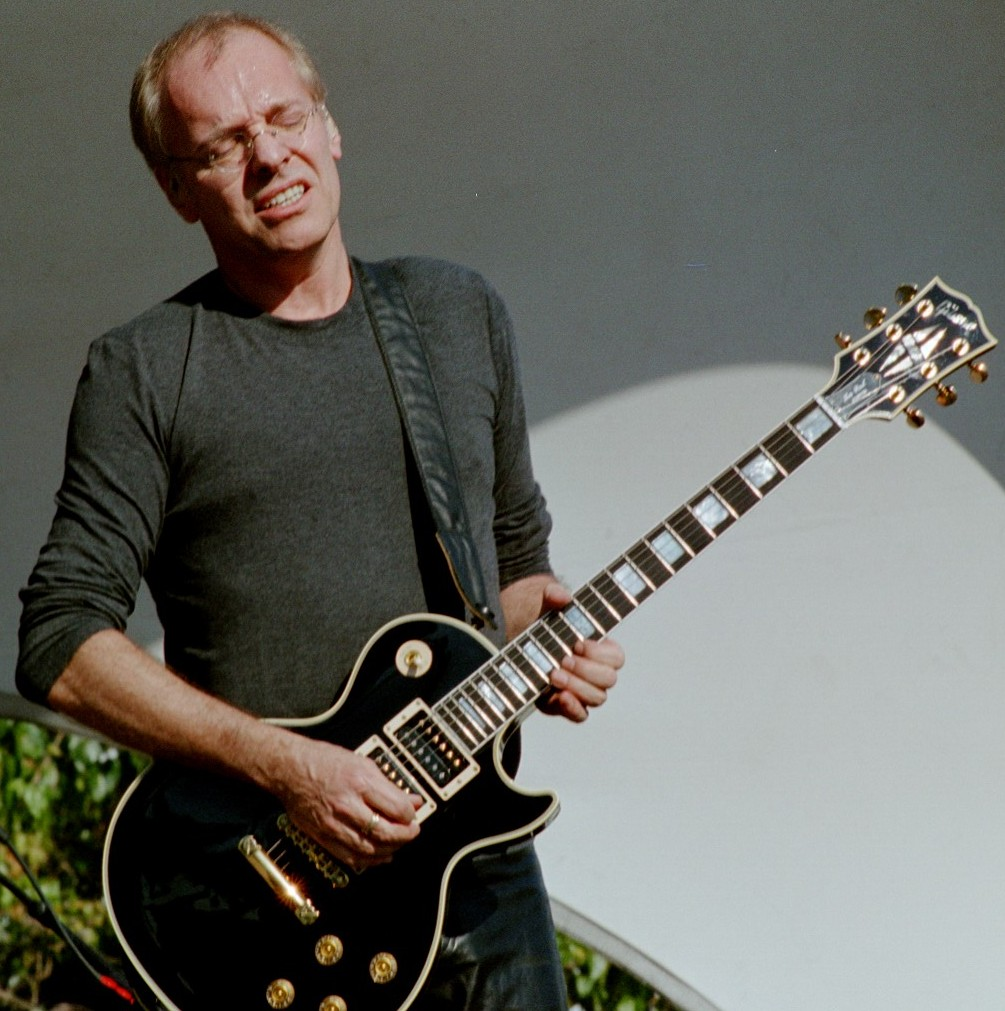
Frampton performing in September 2006

In 2003, Frampton released the album Now, and embarked on a tour with Styx to support it. It was on this tour in 2004 he lost good friend and long time bandmate Bob Mayo. He also toured with the Elms, and appeared in 2006 on the Fox variety show Celebrity Duets, paired with Chris Jericho of WWE fame. They were the first pair voted out.

On 12 September 2006, Frampton released an instrumental work titled Fingerprints. His band consisted of drummer Shawn Fichter, guitarist Audley Freed, bassist John Regan (Frampton's lifelong best friend,), and keyboardist-guitarist Rob Arthur, and guest artists such as members of Pearl Jam, Hank Marvin, Warren Haynes and his bassist on Frampton Comes Alive!, Stanley Sheldon – the only member of the backing band on that album still alive.

=== 2007 to present ===
On 11 February 2007, Fingerprints was awarded the 2007 Grammy Award for Best Pop Instrumental Album. In February 2007, he also appeared on the Chicago-based PBS television show Soundstage.

Frampton released his 14th studio album, Thank You Mr. Churchill, on 27 April 2010. In summer 2010 he began touring North America with the English band Yes; the two acts had played stadium shows on a bill together in 1976. His 2010 band consisted of Rob Arthur (keyboards, guitar, backing vocals), John Regan (bass), Adam Lester (guitar), and Dan Wojciechowski (drums).

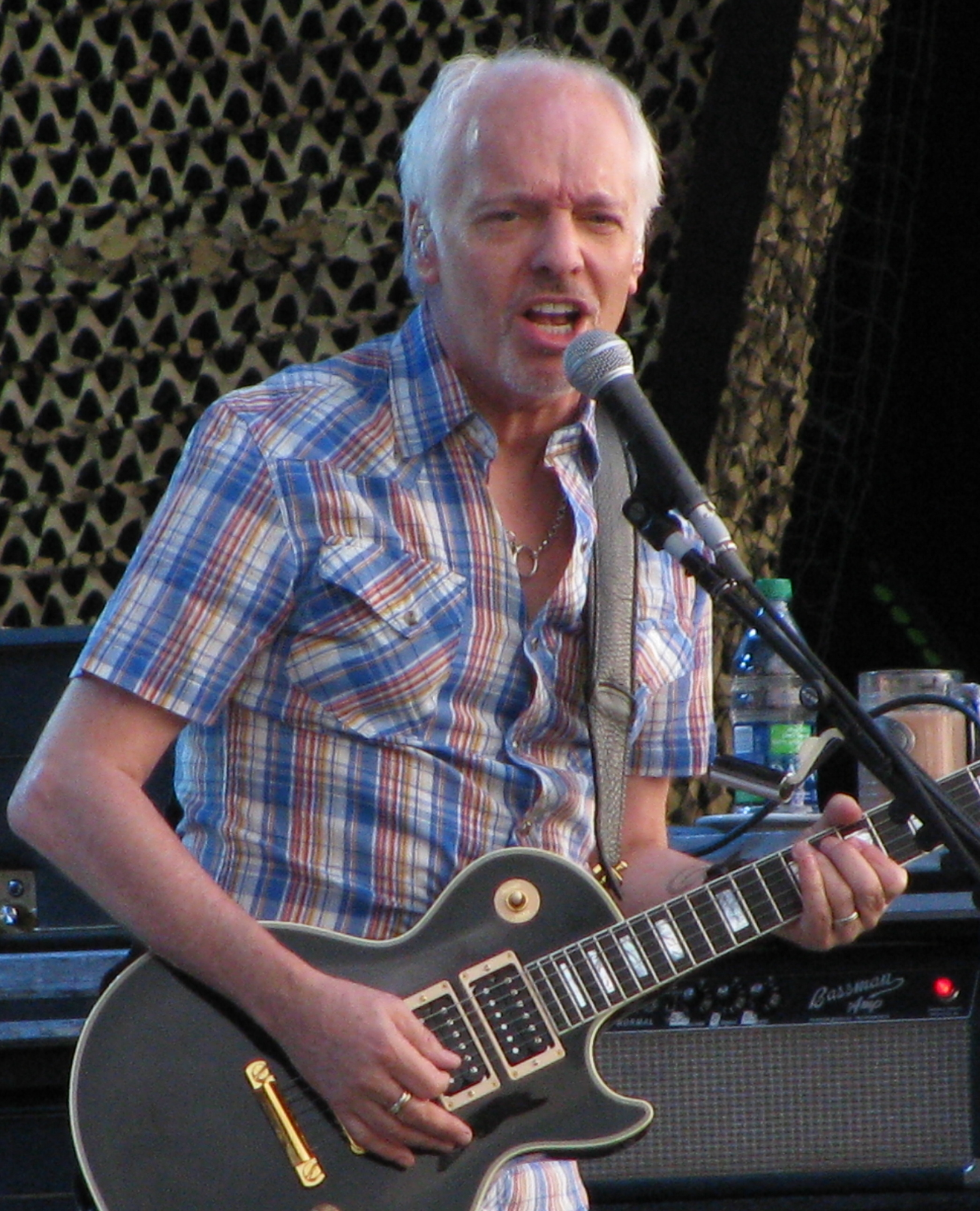
Frampton performing in 2011

Frampton embarked on a UK tour in March 2011 in support of his new album, visiting Leamington Spa, Glasgow, Manchester, London and Bristol. Then, the Frampton Comes Alive 35th Anniversary Tour showcased and followed exactly the songs on the setlist for the original tour from 1976, recorded for Frampton Comes Alive! The concerts each night started with the prerecorded thump of a microphone being turned on, familiar to many fans of the album, followed by the recorded voice of Jerry Pompili saying, "If there was ever a musician that was an honorary member of San Francisco society, Mr. Peter Frampton ...", and then the crowd goes wild. He played the album song-for-song at 69 locations between 15 June 2011 and 22 October 2011 throughout the US. Also in 2011, on 11 June, Frampton performed a live set for Guitar Center Sessions on DirecTV. The episode included an interview with program host Nic Harcourt.

In 2013, Frampton performed throughout North America as part of the Frampton's Guitar Circus Tour which featured periodic guest performers including B.B. King, Robert Cray, Don Felder, Rick Derringer, Kenny Wayne Shepherd, Steve Lukather, Sonny Landreth, Davy Knowles, David Hidalgo, Mike McCready, Roger McGuinn and Vinnie Moore. On 9 February 2014, Frampton was one of several musicians to participate in The Night That Changed America: A Grammy Salute to The Beatles, a tribute to the Beatles on the 50th anniversary of their first appearance on American television.

On 23 June 2014, Frampton released a new album, Hummingbird in a Box. On 11 June 2015, he announced his new studio album, Acoustic Classics; then, on 14 January 2016, he launched the first song: a version of "Do You Feel Like I Do".

In 2016, Frampton was inducted into the Musicians Hall of Fame and Museum. In 2017 and 2018, he toured with the Steve Miller Band, opening the show.

On 22 February 2019, Frampton announced he would be retiring from touring with his Peter Frampton Finale—The Farewell Tour commencing on 18 June 2019 in Tulsa, Oklahoma, running through 12 October ending in Concord, California, at the Concord Pavilion. The tour featured special guest Jason Bonham's Led Zeppelin Evening, as well as Peter's son Julian Frampton on the West Coast stops. He also revealed the reason for the farewell tour; he received a diagnosis of inclusion body myositis (IBM), a progressive muscle disorder characterised by muscle inflammation, weakness, and atrophy (wasting). A dollar of every ticket sold for the tour was donated to benefit Frampton's myositis research fund established at Johns Hopkins Hospital, where he was treated. In June 2019, Frampton's album All Blues debuted at number one in the Billboard Top Blues Albums Chart.

In December 2019, Frampton announced his farewell UK tour to consist of five performances in May 2020. In April this UK/EU tour was cancelled "because of the COVID-19 virus". In November 2022 Frampton resumed his Finale, the Farewell Tour with three dates in the UK (Stoke, Glasgow, London) and five more in the rest of Europe, then one concert at Joe Satriani's workshop in Las Vegas, announcing in advance that he would be seated on stage during these performances. "Standing", he told Guitar World in September 2022, "would be dangerous for me now, because I get so carried away when I'm playing that I'm liable to fall over". Of how the disease is affecting his ability to actually play the guitar, Frampton continued, "It's starting to affect my hands, but not enough yet, so I can still play a good lick. But I'll be honest, I'm anxious about it."

On 6 August 2022, Frampton came out of retirement for one night to perform during "Buddy Holly's 85th Birthday Celebration" at the Buddy Holly Hall of Performing Arts and Sciences in Lubbock, Texas. "I sat down for the first time ever on stage," he told Guitar World later. "And it felt very comfortable [laughs]. Better than leaning on a piano."

As of 2023, Frampton embarked on the Never Say Never tour. Frampton has noted that he did not expect to be able to play again as a result of his diagnosis. He has stated that while his fingers do not work as well as they used to, they worked better than he thought they would, citing it as reason enough to keep doing what he loved on stage. In 2024, Frampton contributed guitar to a re-release of Mark Knopfler's "Going Home: Theme of the Local Hero" in aid of the Teenage Cancer Trust.

On 19 October 2024, Frampton was inducted into the Rock and Roll Hall of Fame by his long-time friend Roger Daltrey. Frampton performed at the ceremony with Keith Urban.

== Media appearances ==
In 1974, Frampton appeared in the film The Son of Dracula as a guitarist in the Count Downes.

In 1978, Frampton portrayed coastwatcher Peter Buckley in an episode of the World War II drama series Baa Baa Black Sheep titled "A Little Bit of England".

In 1978, Frampton played Billy Shears in the film Sgt. Pepper's Lonely Hearts Club Band, starring along with the three brothers Gibb of the band the Bee Gees. The film was inspired by the Beatles album of the same name. Critics were hostile, and the film was a box-office failure.

In 1978, Frampton appeared on the parody talk show, America 2-Night.

In 1988, Frampton appeared in the video release of David Bowie's Glass Spider, a video recording of the 1987 tour of the same name.

In 1996, Frampton appeared in an episode of The Simpsons entitled "Homerpalooza", in which he played "Do You Feel Like We Do". He also made a TV appearance in the Family Guy episode "Death Lives", in which Peter Griffin asks Death to bring Peter Frampton to play "Baby, I Love Your Way" to Lois.

Also in 2000, Frampton served as a technical advisor for Cameron Crowe's autobiographical film, Almost Famous. He wrote some of the songs performed by the fictional band "Stillwater" in the film, supplied guitar tracks, and was the guitar instructor for Billy Crudup, who starred as Russell Hammond, the guitarist for the band. Crudup is quoted as saying, "Who could ask for a better tutor than Peter Frampton?" As an inside joke, he also appears briefly in the film as "Reg", a road manager for Humble Pie, Frampton's real-life former band.

In 2001, Frampton appeared as himself in "Drew Carey's Back-to-School Rock 'n' Roll Comedy Hour", in which he performed "You Had To Be There" and appeared in a brief scene with Mimi, in which he recalls their past relationship.

On 20 December 2006, Frampton appeared on The Colbert Report. Stephen Colbert had a fake feud with the Decemberists to be decided by a head cutting duel. When Colbert faked an injury, Colbert called on Father Christmas to supply a guitar hero, at which point Frampton appeared and won the shred-down.

On 23 April 2010, Frampton became the all-time celebrity champion of the trivia game called No Apparent Reason, with five correctly answered questions on the nationally syndicated Mark and Brian Radio Program originating from KLOS Los Angeles. However, on 5 May 2010, Frampton was reduced to second place after only two weeks by Luke Perry's answering six questions correctly.

On 4 November 2010, Frampton appeared on The Oprah Winfrey Show as one of her favourite musicians.

On 21 October 2011, Frampton was honoured at Music City's at Walk of Fame Park in Nashville, Tennessee.

On 2 March 2016, Frampton was interviewed and performed on the Howard Stern Show.

On 17 March 2016 Frampton performed a NPR Music Tiny Desk Concert with guitarist Gordon Kennedy. The performance was published on 27 April 2016 on the NPR Music YouTube channel.

On 6 January 2019, Frampton appeared as himself on Madam Secretary, where he performed a small portion of "Baby I Love Your Way". He similarly appeared on the final episode of that program (aired 7 December 2019) performing numerous songs at the wedding of the President's daughter.

On 6 August 2021, Frampton challenged OJ Borg through his Radio 2 game "Mid-Afternoon Mastermind" (as Borg was covering for Steve Wright's afternoon show). The subject was Peter Frampton, and Borg scored 2/3.

In January 2024, Frampton played guitar alongside Sheryl Crow for her induction into the Rock & Roll Hall of Fame, with her and Stevie Nicks singing "Every Day is a Winding Road".

In a 31 January 2024 airing of the Fox game show We Are Family, Frampton's son Julian appeared as a relative of an unknown mystery celebrity. After a solo performance of "Rebel Rebel", he then sang a duet of "Black Hole Sun" with the concealed mystery celebrity. At the conclusion of the segment, Peter Frampton was revealed as the other half of the duet.

On March 17, 2026, Frampton announced a new album to be released in May 2026, titled Carry the Light. Produced with his son Julian, it would be his first album of new material in 16 years. The album includes guest appearances by Sheryl Crow, Graham Nash, and Benmont Tench. One of the tracks, "Buried Treasure", is a tribute to Tom Petty.

== Personal life ==
=== Marriages, other relationships and family ===
Frampton has been married three times and has three children. His first marriage was to Mary Lovett, from 1972 to 1976.

Frampton was sued by J. "Penny" McCall in 1978 for palimony. McCall asked for Frampton's earnings during the five years that they were together. According to McCall, she left her husband and gave up her job as a rock promoter and devoted herself full-time to Frampton, just as he achieved superstar status. A New York judge ruled that Frampton and McCall never intended to marry each other and "never held themselves out to the public as husband and wife" and dismissed her complaint because to act otherwise would condone adultery. The case set precedent in New York.

From 1983 to 1993, Frampton was married to Barbara Gold, with whom he had two children. The latter co-wrote and sang on Frampton's song "Road to the Sun" from Thank You Mr. Churchill.

Frampton's third marriage was on 13 January 1996 to Tina Elfers, with whom he had a daughter, Mia Frampton. Frampton filed for divorce from Elfers in Los Angeles, California, on 22 June 2011, citing irreconcilable differences.

=== Other ===
In June 1978, Frampton was involved in a near-fatal car accident in the Bahamas and suffered broken bones, a concussion, and muscle damage. Dealing with the pain of the accident led to a brief period of drug abuse.

Frampton has lived in London and various U.S. locations, including Westchester County, New York; Los Angeles; and Nashville, Tennessee. He moved to Indian Hill, Ohio, a suburb of Cincinnati, in June 2000. This is the birthplace of his ex-wife Elfers, and the city in which they were married in 1996. They chose to live there to be closer to Elfers' family. In 2014, Frampton moved back to Nashville.

Frampton cited the September 11 attacks as his reason for obtaining American citizenship, saying he wanted to begin voting in U.S. elections.

On 20 October 2020, Frampton published his memoir Do You Feel Like I Do?, co-written with Alan Light.

In December 2022, it was announced BMG had acquired the rights to Frampton's catalogue.

=== Health ===
Frampton is a vegetarian. He sobered up in 2002 with the help of Alcoholics Anonymous, which he says saved his life. Since 2019, Frampton has been "living with" the muscle-wasting disease inclusion body myositis. He has continued to perform, confirming 2025 tour dates. Of his health problems he said:

The worst thing about playing for me is when I'm soloing, I have to actually think about what I'm playing. I don't want to think – I want it just to be coming from my heart. That's how I always played. And now I do have to think a little bit, because I'll be in the middle of the passage and I'll say, 'That finger is not going to get there in time!' So I do a regroup and I use one finger for many notes that I used to use three fingers for.

As for people asking if he's depressed about his condition, he responded: "You have to accept the things you cannot change. I learned that in A.A., and in many other places. What I have is not life-threatening, thank God, but it's life-changing, and I'm going with the flow."

== Equipment ==
On the cover of the double live album Frampton Comes Alive, Frampton plays a highly customized 1954 black Gibson Les Paul Custom that was given to him by his friend, Marc Mariana. While touring in 1980, the guitar and other instruments and stage equipment were placed on a cargo flight from Venezuela to Panama. The plane crashed shortly after takeoff and the cargo was presumed destroyed. However, the guitar apparently had survived and Frampton was able to recover it in 2011 after a collector spotted it in Curaçao. He continues to play the Les Paul now known as the "Phenix".

Frampton is generally known as the artist who made the talk box famous. A talk box is used to transfer the guitar's sound through a plastic tube attached to a microphone. The effect is the guitar simulating speech. Frampton now sells his own line of custom-designed "Frampton" products, including a talk box.

In 1987, Frampton played a natural-finish maple bodied Pensa-Suhr Strat type, hand-made by New York-based John Suhr which he used for David Bowie's Glass Spider Tour. He also used a Coral electric sitar, given to him in the late 70s and previously owned by Jimi Hendrix, on Bowie's 1987 album Never Let Me Down.

== Discography ==
- Wind of Change (1972)
- Frampton's Camel (1973)
- Somethin's Happening (1974)
- Frampton (1975)
- I'm in You (1977)
- Where I Should Be (1979)
- Breaking All the Rules (1981)
- The Art of Control (1982)
- Premonition (1986)
- When All the Pieces Fit (1989)
- Peter Frampton (1994)
- Now (2003)
- Fingerprints (2006)
- Thank You Mr. Churchill (2010)
- Hummingbird in a Box (2014)
- Acoustic Classics (2016)
- All Blues (2019)
- Frampton Forgets the Words (Instrumental cover tracks) (2021)
- Carry the Light (2026)
