= I'm in You =

Studio album by Peter Frampton
- Released: 3 June 1977
- Recorded: November 1976 – April 1977
- Studios: Electric Lady, Greenwich Village, New York; The Record Plant, New York City; The Hit Factory, New York City
- Genre: Pop rock
- Length: 39:29
- Label: A&M
- Producer: Peter Frampton

Peter Frampton chronology
Frampton Comes Alive! (1976)	I'm in You (1977)	Where I Should Be (1979)

I'm in You is the fifth studio album by English musician and songwriter Peter Frampton. It was released on 3 June 1977, almost a year and a half after his 1976 signature breakthrough live album, Frampton Comes Alive! It was recorded at Electric Lady Studios in New York, where Frampton's Camel was recorded four years earlier. Stevie Wonder, Richie Hayward, Mike Finnigan and Mick Jagger are featured on the album.

I'm in You is Frampton's most commercially successful studio album; it rose to the No. 2 slot on the US Billboard 200 and was certified platinum, while in Canada, the album entered the chart directly at #1. The title track became his most successful single yet, reaching No. 2 on the US Billboard Hot 100. On the Cash Box singles chart, "I'm in You" reached No. 1, as it also did in Canada.

== Reception ==
Professional ratings
Review scores
Source	Rating
AllMusic	4/5 stars
Christgau's Record Guide	C−
The Encyclopedia of Popular Music	2/5 stars
The Rolling Stone Album Guide	1/5 stars

Record World said of the single "Tried to Love" that "A loping rhythm and blues with signature instrumental effects will likely be Frampton's third straight single success from I'm in You" and that "The rhythm is engaging." However, "Tried to Love" only reached No. 41 on the Billboard Hot 100.

== Track listing ==
All tracks composed by Peter Frampton, except where indicated.

Side one

1. "I'm in You" – 4:10
2. "(Putting My) Heart on the Line" – 3:42
3. "St. Thomas (Don't You Know How I Feel)" – 4:15
4. "Won't You Be My Friend" – 8:10

Side two

1. "You Don't Have to Worry" – 5:16
2. "Tried to Love" – 4:27
3. "Rocky's Hot Club" – 3:25
4. "(I'm a) Road Runner" – 3:40 (Brian Holland, Lamont Dozier, Edward Holland Jr.)
5. "Signed, Sealed, Delivered (I'm Yours)" – 3:54 (Lee Garrett, Lula Mae Hardaway, Stevie Wonder, Syreeta Wright)

== Personnel ==
- Peter Frampton – electric guitars, acoustic guitars, slide guitar, bass guitar, piano, organ, Moog synthesizer, mini-Moog, ARP String Synthesizer, ARP Axxe, clavinet, harmonica, drums, percussion, vocals, talk box
- Bob Mayo – organ, Hammond B-3, synthesizer, Moog synthesizer, ARP String Synthesizer, ARP Axxe, clavinet, melodica, electric piano, piano, Fender Rhodes, accordion, guitar, acoustic guitar, backing vocals
- Stevie Wonder – harmonica on "Rocky's Hot Club"
- Mick Jagger – backing vocals on "I'm in You", "Tried to Love" and "Signed, Sealed, Delivered (I'm Yours)"
- Mike Finnigan – backing vocals on "Signed, Sealed, Delivered (I'm Yours)"
- Stanley Sheldon – bass guitar, backing vocals
- John Siomos – drums, percussion, tambourine
- Richie Hayward – drums, percussion, congas on "St. Thomas (Don't You Know How I Feel)", "Won't You Be My Friend" and "Tried To Love"

=== Production ===
- Producers: Peter Frampton, Chris Kimsey, Bob Mayo, Frankie D'Augusta
- Engineers: Peter Frampton, Chris Kimsey, Bob Mayo, Frankie D'Augusta
- Mixing: Peter Frampton, Chris Kimsey, Bob Mayo, Frankie D'Augusta
- Mastering: George Marino, Doug Sax, Arnie Acosta
- Art Direction: Vartan, Roland Young, Ryan Rogers
- Photography: Neal Preston, Irving Penn
- Supervisor: Beth Stempel, Bill Levenson
- Coordinator: Beth Stempel, Bill Levenson

== Chart positions ==
=== Weekly charts ===
Chart (1977–1978)	Peak position
Australian Albums (Kent Music Report)	4
Canadian Albums (RPM)	1
German Albums (Offizielle Top 100)	37
Japanese Albums (Oricon)	24
New Zealand Albums (RMNZ)	8
Norwegian Albums (VG-lista)	21
Portuguese Albums (Billboard)	4
Swedish Albums (Sverigetopplistan)	33
US Billboard 200	2
US Rock LP Best Sellers (Billboard)	2

=== Year-end charts ===
Chart (1977)	Position
Australian Albums (Kent Music Report)	24
Canadian Albums (RPM)	7
New Zealand Albums (RMNZ)	38
US Billboard 200	72

== Certifications ==
Certifications and sales for I'm in You
Region	Certification	Certified units/sales
Australia (ARIA)	Platinum	50,000^{^}
Canada (Music Canada)	Platinum	100,000^{^}
Japan	—	35,000
United Kingdom (BPI)	Silver	60,000^{^}
United States (RIAA)	Platinum	1,000,000^{^}
^{^} Shipments figures based on certification alone.
