= Lisa Loeb discography =

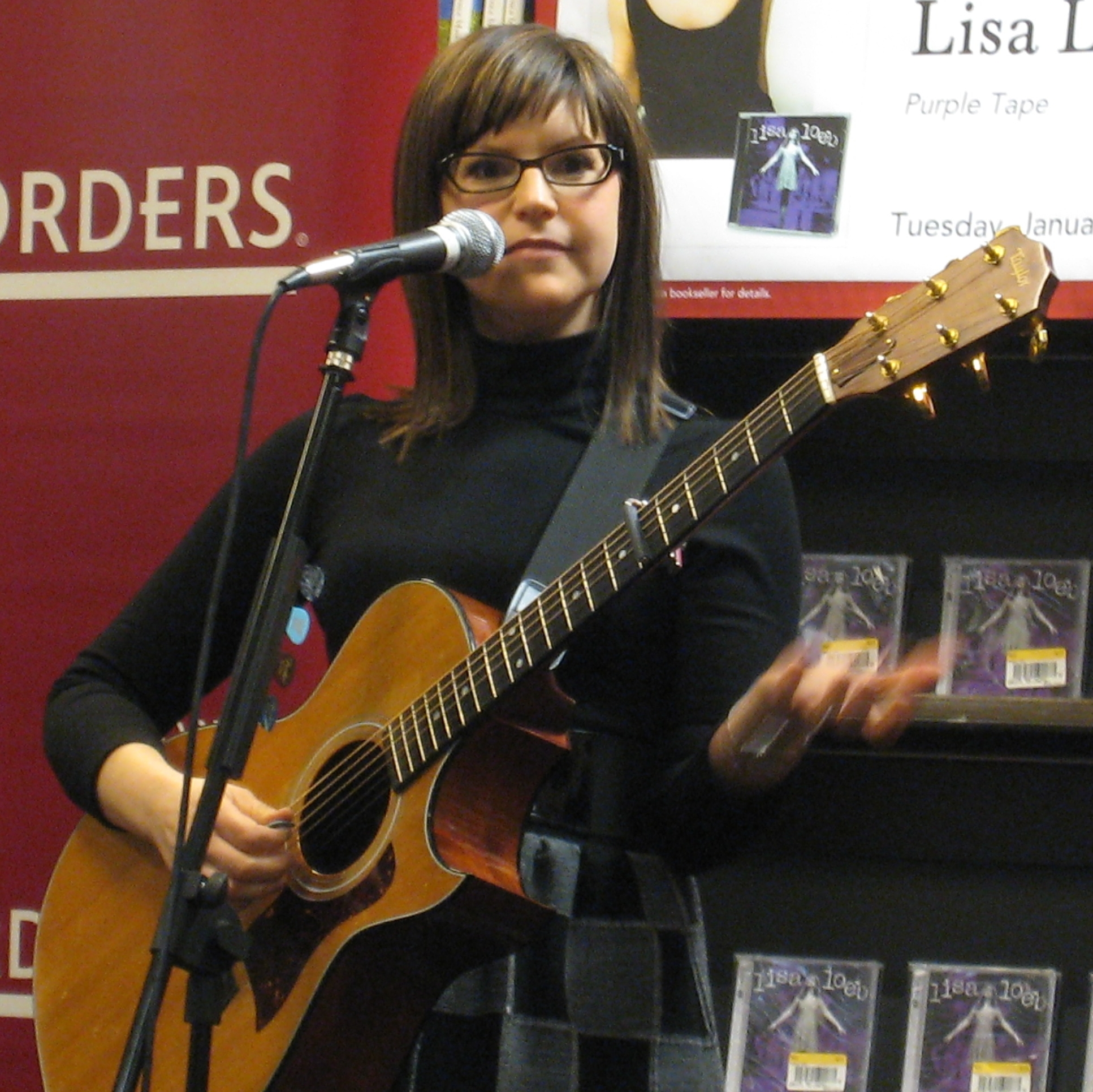
- Studio albums: 15
- Extended plays: 2
- Compilation albums: 1
- Singles: 33
- Music videos: 19
- No. 1 singles: 1

The following is a detailed discography for American rock music singer-songwriter Lisa Loeb, including her work as Lisa Loeb & Nine Stories. Loeb has released a total of 15 studio albums, 1 compilation album, and 2 EPs. She has also released over 30 singles.

In the beginning of her career, Loeb began as a young singer-songwriter with friend, Elizabeth Mitchell, with whom she recorded two albums. In 1994, her self-penned song, "Stay (I Missed You)" was featured in the soundtrack of Reality Bites, after which it gained widespread airplay on radio. The song reached #1 on the Billboard Hot 100, and also reached the Top 10 on both the Hot Adult Contemporary Tracks and Modern Rock Tracks charts. She released her first major label studio album the following year with Tails, and had continued success in the United States, along with her third studio album, Firecracker.

Loeb began the new millennium focused on children's music and has since recorded several albums in the genre, including Camp Lisa. 2013 saw the return of adult material with the release of studio album No Fairy Tale. Loeb returned again to children's albums with Nursery Rhyme Parade!, which was made available on October 16, 2015.

== Albums ==
=== Studio albums ===
Year	Album details	Chart positions							Certifications (sales threshold)
Year	Album details	US	AUS	CAN	NL	NZ	SWE	UK	Certifications (sales threshold)
1992	Purple Tape: Released: 1992 (Cassette); Re-Released: January 22, 2008 (CD); Label: self-released	—	—	—	—	—	—	—	
1995	Tails (Lisa Loeb & Nine Stories): Released: September 26, 1995; Label: Geffen	30	42	15	85	6	44	39	CAN: Platinum; US: Gold
1997	Firecracker: Released: November 11, 1997; Label: Geffen	88	182	53	—	31	57	157	CAN: Gold; US: Gold
2002	Cake and Pie: Released: February 26, 2002; Label: A&M	199	—	—	—	—	—	—	
2002	Hello Lisa: Released: October 8, 2002; Label: Artemis	—	—	—	—	—	—	—	
2004	The Way It Really Is: Released: August 10, 2004; Label: Zoë	—	—	—	—	—	—	—	
2012	No Fairy Tale: Released: December 12, 2012; Label: 429 Records	—	—	—	—	—	—	—	
2017	Lullaby Girl: Released: October 6, 2017; Label: Furious Rose	—	—	—	—	—	—	—	
2020	A Simple Trick to Happiness: Released: February 28, 2020; Label: Furious Rose	—	—	—	—	—	—	—	
— denotes releases that did not chart.

=== Children's albums ===
Year	Album details
2003	Catch the Moon (Lisa Loeb and Elizabeth Mitchell): Released: May 25, 2004; Label: Artemis
2008	Camp Lisa: Released: September 16, 2008; Label: Furious Rose
2011	Lisa Loeb's Silly Sing-Along: The Disappointing Pancake and Other Zany Songs: Album included with children's hardcover book; Released: October 4, 2011; Label: Sterling Publishing
2013	Lisa Loeb's Songs For Movin' And Shakin': The Air Band Song And Other Toe-Tapping Tunes: Album included with children's hardcover book; Released: 2013; Label: Sterling Publishing
2015	Nursery Rhyme Parade!: Released: October 16, 2015; Label: Furious Rose Productions
2016	Feel What U Feel: Released: October 7, 2016; Label: Amazon Music

=== Compilation albums ===
Year	Album details
2005	The Very Best Of Lisa Loeb: Released: April 26, 2005 (JP), Jan 26, 2006 (U.S.); Label: Universal Japan, Geffen Records

=== With Liz and Lisa ===
Year	Album details
1989	Liz and Lisa: Released: 1989; Label:
1990	Liz and Lisa – Days Were Different: Released: 1990; Label:

== EPs ==
Year	Album details
2007	Cherries: Released: April, 2007; Label: Geffen
2008	Live at Lime with Lisa Loeb: Released: 2008; Label: Lime Wire LLC

== Singles ==
=== As lead artist ===
Year	Song	Peak chart positions										Certifications	Album
Year	Song	US	US Adult	US Pop	AUS	CAN	GER	ICE	NZ	SWE	UK	Certifications	Album
1994	"Stay (I Missed You)"	1	5	1	6	1	59	9	14	38	6	US: Gold; UK: Gold	Reality Bites: Original Motion Picture Soundtrack
1995	"Do You Sleep?"	18	30	13	49	8	—	26	—	—	45		Tails
1995	"Taffy"	106	—	—	96	61	—	—	39	—	—		Tails
1996	"Waiting for Wednesday"	83	36	29	—	23	—	—	—	—	—		Tails
1997	"I Do"	17	3	10	85	1	81	—	—	—	83		Firecracker
1998	"Let's Forget About it"	71	38	34	—	21	100	23	—	—	—		Firecracker
1998	"Truthfully"	—	—	—	—	—	—	—	—	—	—		Firecracker
2002	"Someone You Should Know"	—	—	—	—	—	—	—	—	—	—		Cake and Pie
2002	"Underdog"	—	39	—	—	—	—	—	—	—	—		Cake and Pie
2004	"Fools Like Me"	—	—	—	—	—	—	—	—	—	—		The Way It Really Is
2007	"Gypsys, Tramps & Thieves"	—	—	—	—	—	—	—	—	—	—		Non-album single
2007	"Jenny Jenkins"	—	—	—	—	—	—	—	—	—	—		Non-album single
2013	"No Fairy Tale"	—	—	—	—	—	—	—	—	—	—		No Fairy Tale
2013	"A Holiday Song"	—	—	—	—	—	—	—	—	—	—		Non-album single
2014	"Light"	—	—	—	—	—	—	—	—	—	—		Non-album single
2015	"Champagne (I'm Ready)"	—	—	—	—	—	—	—	—	—	—		Non-album single
2016	"3, 2, 1, Let Go"	—	—	—	—	—	—	—	—	—	—		Non-album single (from Helicopter Mom)
2016	"11 Planets"	—	—	—	—	—	—	—	—	—	—		Non-album single
2016	"Feel What U Feel" (feat Craig Robinson)	—	—	—	—	—	—	—	—	—	—		Feel What U Feel
2016	"Moon Star Pie (It's Gonna Be Alright)"	—	—	—	—	—	—	—	—	—	—		Feel What U Feel
2017	"Wanna Do Day" (feat. Ed Helms)	—	—	—	—	—	—	—	—	—	—		Feel What U Feel
2017	"The Sky Is Always Blue"	—	—	—	—	—	—	—	—	—	—		Feel What U Feel
2017	"Don't Stop"	—	—	—	—	—	—	—	—	—	—		Lullaby Girl
2017	"O-o-h Child"	—	—	—	—	—	—	—	—	—	—		Lullaby Girl
2018	"All the Young Dudes"	—	—	—	—	—	—	—	—	—	—		Non-album single
2018	"Rainbow Connection"	—	—	—	—	—	—	—	—	—	—		Lullaby Girl
2019	"First Day of My Life"	—	—	—	—	—	—	—	—	—	—		Non-album single
2019	"Love Never Dies"	—	—	—	—	—	—	—	—	—	—		Non-album single
2019	"Sing Out"	—	—	—	—	—	—	—	—	—	—		A Simple Trick to Happiness
2019	"Skeleton"	—	—	—	—	—	—	—	—	—	—		A Simple Trick to Happiness
2020	"This is My Life"	—	—	—	—	—	—	—	—	—	—		A Simple Trick to Happiness
— denotes releases that did not chart or were not released in that territory.

=== As featured artist ===
Year	Song	Artist	US Mod. Rock	Album
2006	"Anti-Hero"	Rin'	36	Inland Sea
2019	"Stay (I Missed You)"	Walk Off the Earth	—	Non-album single

== Other appearances ==
Year	Title	Album	Artist
2004	"Jingle Bells"	Maybe This Christmas Tree	Various Artists
2004	"High Hopes" (Renee and Friends featuring Lisa Loeb and Elizabeth Mitchell)	Kindred	Renee and Friends
2021	"Return" (Open Hand feat. Lisa Loeb)	Weirdo	Open Hand
2024	"Gypsies, Tramps And Thieves"	An All-Star Tribute To Cher	Various Artists

== Music videos ==
Year	Title	Album
1994	"Stay (I Missed You)"	Reality Bites Soundtrack
1996	Taffy	Tails
1997	"I Do"	Firecracker
1997	"Let's Forget About It"	Firecracker
2003	"Catch the Moon" (with Elizabeth Mitchell as Liz and Lisa)	Catch the Moon
2017	"Don't Stop"	Lullaby Girl
2017	"Dream a Little Dream"	Lullaby Girl
2017	"Tomorrow"	Lullaby Girl
2017	"Say Hello"	Feel What U Feel
2017	"Wiggle"	Feel What U Feel
2017	"Feel What U Feel"	Feel What U Feel
2017	"Inch Worm"	Feel What U Feel
2018	"Rainbow Connection"	Lullaby Girl
2019	"Skeleton"	A Simple Trick to Happiness
2020	"This Is My Life"	A Simple Trick to Happiness
2020	"Another Day"	A Simple Trick to Happiness
2020	"For the Birch"	A Simple Trick to Happiness
2020	"Shine"	A Simple Trick to Happiness
2020	"The Upside"	A Simple Trick to Happiness
