= You Are My Sunshine (disambiguation) =

"You Are My Sunshine" is a popular song.

You Are My Sunshine may also refer to:

== Films ==
- You Are My Sunshine (2005 film), a South Korean film
- You Are My Sunshine (2015 film), a Chinese film

== Music ==
- You Are My Sunshine (Copeland album)
- You Are My Sunshine (Elizabeth Mitchell album)

== Television ==
- "You Are My Sunshine" (Miracles), an episode of the American television series Miracles
- "You Are My Sunshine", season 6, episode 12 of Sons of Anarchy

== See also ==
- "You're My Sunshine", a song by Namie Amuro
