= Camp Lisa =

Studio album by Lisa Loeb
- Released: June 3, 2008
- Studio: The Path, Valley Village, California
- Genre: Children's music
- Length: 35:58
- Label: Redeye
- Producer: Lisa Loeb

Lisa Loeb chronology
The Very Best of Lisa Loeb (2005)	Camp Lisa (2008)	No Fairy Tale (2012)

Professional ratings
Review scores
Source	Rating
AllMusic	4/5 stars

Camp Lisa is a children's album by Lisa Loeb. Loeb's sixth solo album, Camp Lisa is her second foray into children's music following the collaborative album Catch the Moon. The album features 19 children's camp songs, such as "Home on the Range", "Peanut Butter & Jelly", and "The Cookie Jar Chant". It was recorded and released in June 2008. It features a cover of the song "Ready for the Summer" from the film, Meatballs.

== Track listing ==
No.	Title	Writer(s)	Length
1.	"Are You Ready for the Summer?"	Elmer Bernstein, Norman Gimbel	1:21
2.	"Going Away"	Lisa Loeb, Michelle Lewis, Dan Petty	3:28
3.	"Woodchuck #1"		0:23
4.	"Wake Up Song"	Loeb, Lewis, Petty	1:11
5.	"Best Friend"	Loeb, Lewis, Petty	2:44
6.	"Grandma's in the Cellar"		0:41
7.	"The Disappointing Pancake"	Loeb, Lewis, Petty	3:21
8.	"Woodchuck #2"		0:19
9.	"Home on the Range"	Brewster Higley VI, Daniel E. Kelley	3:39
10.	"Father Abraham"		2:06
11.	"Woodchuck #3"		0:11
12.	"Love Is a Rose"	Neil Young	2:07
13.	"Peanut Butter and Jelly"		1:06
14.	"When It Rains"	Loeb, Lewis, Petty	3:42
15.	"The Cookie Jar Chant"		1:32
16.	"The Cookie Jar Song"		2:13
17.	"H.A.P.P.Y."		0:06
18.	"It's Not Goodbye"	Loeb, Lewis, Petty	3:36
19.	"Linger"		2:12

== Personnel ==
- Leland Sklar – bass
- Steve Martin – banjo
- Jay Bellerose – drums, percussion
- Jill Sobule – vocals, banjo
- Doug Petty – piano, Wurlitzer piano, Wurlitzer organ
- Maia Sharp – vocals
- Michelle Lewis – vocals, kazoo
- Dan Petty – vocals, guitar, acoustic guitar, mandolin, ukulele, tambourine
- Lisa Loeb – vocals, acoustic guitar
