= Dweezil & Lisa =

- Genre: Reality television
- Presented by: Dweezil Zappa; Lisa Loeb
- Country of origin: United States
- Original language: English
- No. of seasons: 1

Production
- Running time: 30 minutes

Original release
- Network: Food Network
- Release: January 16, 2004

Dweezil & Lisa was a 2004 Food Network television series presented by rock musicians and erstwhile couple Dweezil Zappa and Lisa Loeb. The duo traveled around the United States, sampling local music and cuisine.

The show originated from pie cooking demos that Loeb incorporated into some of her concerts to support her 2002 album, Cake and Pie. The pair approached Food Network to highlight these activities on a segment of one of its existing shows, but the network offered them an entire television series instead.

In the opening episode (January 16, 2004), they visited Atlanta, Georgia; the couple visited places like Gladys Knight & Ron Winans' Chicken & Waffles, a soul food restaurant, and the Varsity, America's largest drive-in restaurant. New York Post reviewer Adam Buckman described the show as "a heaping helping of cutie-pie" and "[s]omewhere between spicy and bland." Barbara Hooks of The Age commented that the show "draws a long bow, cutting awkwardly from Dweezil playing charity golf in Chicago to Lisa on a confectionary [sic] crawl of the windy city."
