= Li'l Liza Jane =

Song dating back to the 1910s

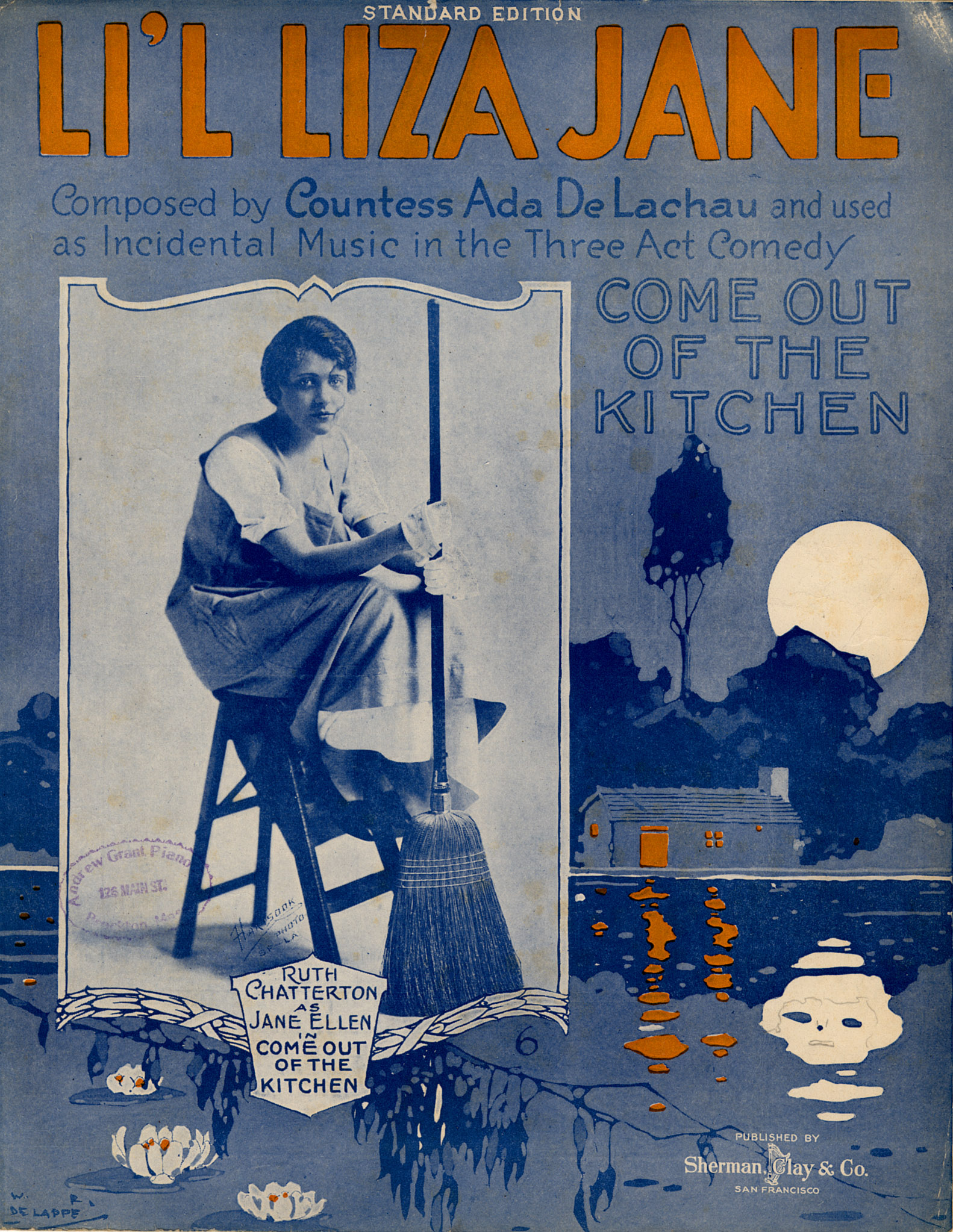
1916 sheet music cover, with inset photo of Ruth Chatterton.

"Li'l Liza Jane" or "Little Liza Jane" is a song that dates back to the Antebellum South and is closely related to a suite of other songs with similar titles, including "Oh! Liza Poor Gal," "Goodbye Liza Jane," and "Steal Miss Liza." Songs in the "Liza Jane" family have become perennial standards (as both instrumentals and tunes with lyrics) in traditional jazz, folk music, and bluegrass, as well as appearing in numerous other genres including rock and roll, blues, and R&B. Numerous scholars and musicologists have written about the song, and it is one of the standards of the New Orleans brass band tradition, where it thrives today. According to a 2023 book, Poor-Gal: The Cultural History of Little Liza Jane, many "Liza Jane" variants have enjoyed "big audience" moments throughout American history. For instance, "Li'l Liza Jane" became a sensation in the World War I era when a version was placed in a songbook given to all American servicemen and again in 1960 when Harry Belafonte performed a version as part of his CBS television special New York 19.

== Origins ==
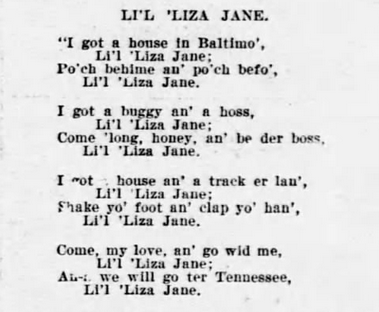
Lyrics published in the Evening Star as a "dialect song" in 1905. In his book, Poor Gal, scholar Dan Gutstein attributes these lyrics to a short story published by Anne Virginia Culbertson in 1904.

In his book, Poor Gal, scholar Dan Gutstein indicates that "Little Liza Jane" and "a suite of closely related folk songs likely originated among enslaved people during celebratory dances or 'frolics' on southern plantations." Gutstein cites ten narratives from the Works Progress Administration Slave Narrative Collection in establishing the song's origins. During the Civil War, some "Liza Jane" songs likely "leaked out" from the folk repertoire of enslaved people and were adopted by regiments from both sides of the war, including the 43rd United States Colored Troops Regiment, the 23rd North Carolina Regiment (known as the Pee Dee Guards), and the Indiana 67th Regiment.

After the war concluded, some "Liza Jane" variants were popularized in burnt cork minstrelsy—most notably an early version of "Goodbye Liza Jane," which was published as sheet music by bandleader Eddie Fox in 1871. However, the best-known variant "Little Liza Jane" likely remained fixed in folk tradition until a variety of writers and performers popularized the melody and certain lyrics in the early 20th century; these individuals would include the writer Anne Virginia Culbertson, the composer Ada de Lachau, the actress Ruth Chatterton, bandleader Earl Fuller, and banjoist Harry C. Browne. Even as many "Liza Jane" variants therefore appeared in nineteenth century and early twentieth century popular culture, Gutstein attributes their ultimate origins as being the name Liza Jane "affixed to 'snotches' of folk melodies or as several 'one-verse songs' among enslaved people on plantations in several states." This may account for the many different titles (such as "Little Liza Jane" and "Goodbye Liza Jane") as well as a wide variety of lyrics.

== In popular culture ==
"Li'l Liza Jane" was first published as lyrics (without notated music) in 1904 by Anne Virginia Culbertson as part of her book At the Big House. A different version of the song was published as sheet music in 1916 by Sherman, Clay & Co of San Francisco, California, with compositional credit going to Countess Ada de Lachau (Ada Louise Metz, 1866–1956). The tune was featured as entr'acte entertainment during the 1916-1917 Broadway show Come Out of the Kitchen.

In addition to "Liza Jane" songs appearing in a World War I songbook (Songs of Soldiers and Sailors U.S.) and in Harry Belafonte's widely watched television special, they also appeared in the early talking film Coquette, an early Mickey Mouse cartoon, the popular Fibber McGee and Molly radio show, and hit televisions series such as The Andy Griffith Show and Gunsmoke; these are just a few of the appearances that would help popularize "Liza Jane" songs.

Drawing on minstrelsy versions of the Goodbye Liza Jane" variant, Tin Pan Alley composer Harry Von Tilzer published sheet music in 1903 entitled "Goodbye, Eliza Jane." This version of the song became a "hit" through sheet music sales and cylinder recordings by the likes of Bob Roberts, Arthur Collins, and Billy Murray. Gutstein indicates that the versions of "Goodbye Liza Jane" that circulated later in the 20th century and those that are still popular today -- including titles such as "Black Them Boots," "Going Down to Cairo," and "Charlotte Town" -- descend from late nineteenth century / early twentieth century play party tradition, are nonracial in character, and do not share anything with minstrelsy versions except for the title. Notably, a version by Bob Wills was performed by Wills and his bandmates in the 1945 film Blazing the Western Trail. In addition to Wills, many musicians recorded the play party version (i.e., the nonracial version) of "Goodbye Liza Jane" including Judy Henske, Pete Seeger, and Nora Brown.

As noted, the song's origins go back to the Antebellum South. Lucy Thurston remembered a song with the refrain "Ohoooooooo lil Liza, lil Liza Jane" being sung by enslaved people in the area of Covington, Louisiana before the American Civil War. While the melody is not preserved in the written interview, the lyrics and their rhythm strongly suggest a relationship to the Culbertson and de Lachau lyrics published decades later. Thurston is one of ten women and men to document "Liza Jane" songs in their Works Progress Administration interviews, referring to a wide variety of lyrics and dance traditions, including stealing partners ring games. In 1919, musicologist Natalie Curtis Burlin documented a stealing partners version of "Little Liza Jane" that had been popular for decades among students at Hampton Institute, now Hampton University. As part of the game, couples would dance in a circle, with an extra man in the middle. The extra man would "steal a partner" from one of the couples thereby forcing the man without a dance partner to assume the spot in the center of the circle, and so on, as the process repeated.

== Selected list of recordings (in chronological order) ==
Discographic information for these recordings can be found in Gutstein's book Poor Gal, as well as numerous other sources. Note that some records (e.g. Silas Leachman's song "Whoa Dar Mule" and Henry "Ragtime" Thomas’s song "Run, Mollie, Run") are considered to be part of the "Liza Jane" family as they contain significant "Liza Jane" content.

- George W. Johnson. "The Laughing Coon." Edison 4005, 1898. [According to Gutstein, this is the earliest-known recording of any "Liza Jane" song, in the "Goodbye Liza Jane" tradition.]
- Silas Leachman. "Whoa Dar Mule." Victor A-801, 1901.
- Arthur Collins. "Goodbye Eliza Jane." Victor matrix A-594, B-594, 1903.
- Earl Fuller's Famous Jazz Band. "Li'l Liza Jane—One Step." Victor 18394, 1917.
- Harry C. Browne and the Peerless Quartet. "Li'l Liza Jane." Columbia A-2622, 1918.
- Edith Wilson with Johnny Dunn's Original Jazz Hounds. "Vampin' Liza Jane." Columbia A3749, 1921.
- The Stanley Trio [including Roba Stanley.] "Whoa! Mule." OKeh 40271, 1924.
- Fiddlin' John Carson & His Virginia Reelers. "Good-bye, Liza Jane." OKeh 45049, 1926.
- Tenneva Ramblers. "Miss 'Liza Poor Gal." Victor 21141, 1927. [This recording was part of the “legendary” Bristol Sessions.]
- Henry "Ragtime" Thomas. "Run, Mollie, Run." Vocalion 1141, 1927.
- Bob Wills and His Texas Playboys. "Goodbye, Liza Jane." Columbia 20555, 1942.
- Lead Belly. "Liza Jane." Leadbelly’s Last Sessions. Folkways, 1953.
- Huey "Piano" Smith and His Rhythm Aces. "Little Liza Jane." Ace Records 521, 1956.
- Merle Travis. "Possum Up A Simmon Tree." Back Home. Capitol T-891, 1957.
- Fats Domino. "Lil' Liza Jane." Imperial AI 103, 1959.
- Pete Seeger, Mike Seeger, and Rev. Larry Eisenberg. "Goodbye Liza Jane." American Play Parties. Folkways FC 7604, 1959.
- Nina Simone. "Little Liza Jane." Nina Simone at Newport. Colpix CP-412, 1960.
- Ramsey Lewis. "Li’l Liza Jane." Stretching Out. Argo LPS 665, 1960.
- Duane Eddy. "Big 'Liza." Girls! Girls! Girls! Jamie JLP 3019, 1961.
- Bing Crosby. "Li'l Liza Jane." 101 Gang Songs. Warner Bros. 1961.
- Coleman Hawkins. "Go Lil Liza." Today and Now. Impulse! A-34, 1962.
- Judy Henske. "Charlotte Town." Elektra EKSN 45007-A, 1963.
- Mississippi John Hurt. "Liza Jane (God's Unchanging Hand.)" Folk Songs and Blues. Piedmont PLP 13157, 1963.
- Davie Jones [David Bowie] with the King Bees. "Liza Jane." Vocalion Pop V.9221, 1964. [This record is widely known to be Bowie's first recorded single.]
- Preservation Hall Jazz Band. "Little Liza Jane." New Orleans' Sweet Emma And Her Preservation Hall Jazz Band. Preservation Hall VPS 2, 1964.
- Levon and the Hawks [The Band]. "Go Go Liza Jane." Atco 45-6625, 1964.
- Dr. John. "Little Liza Jane." Dr. John's Gumbo. Atco 7006, 1972.
- Ralph Stanley. "Rocky Island." A Man and His Music. Rebel Records SLP 1530 REB-1530, 1974.
- Little Richard. "Steal Miss Liza." Manticore 7007, 1975.
- Doc Watson. "Liza Jane." Out in the Country. Intermedia QS-5031, 1982.
- Allison Krauss and Union Station. "Little Liza Jane." So Long So Wrong. Rounder 0365, 1997. [This rendition of "Little Liza Jane" won a 1998 "Grammy Award for Country Instrumental Performance"]
- Elizabeth Mitchell. "Little Liza Jane." You Are My Little Bird. Smithsonian Folkways SFW 45063, 2006.
- The National Reserve. "Little Liza Jane." In Due Time: Volume Three. 2020.
- Nora Brown. "Liza Jane." Sidetrack My Engine. Jalopy Records JR-009, 2021.

== Documentary film ==
"Li'l Liza Jane" is also the subject of a forthcoming documentary film, Li'l Liza Jane: A Movie About a Song, featuring Dom Flemons as well as performances and interviews with Cha Wa, Ben Jaffe, musicians from a second line parade, a keyboardist playing a steamship-mounted calliope, and several other musicians and culture bearers. It was filmed in November 2025 in New Orleans at sites such as Preservation Hall, the French Quarter, and the 7th Ward. Additional footage from Washington, D.C. features the harmonica playing of the late Phil Wiggins, and contextual interviews.

== See also ==
- List of pre-1920 jazz standards
