= You Are My Little Bird =

Studio album by Elizabeth Mitchell
- Released: August 29, 2006
- Genre: Children's music, Folk
- Length: 34 minutes
- Label: Smithsonian Folkways Recordings
- Producer: Elizabeth Mitchell and Warren Defever

Elizabeth Mitchell chronology
Catch the Moon (2003)	You Are My Little Bird (2006)

Professional ratings
Review scores
Source	Rating
eMusic	(favorable)
School Library Journal	(very favorable)

You Are My Little Bird is an album by Elizabeth Mitchell, released in 2006 by Smithsonian Folkways Recordings. The album presents a collection of folk songs for children. In addition to versions of folk tunes, it features covers of a variety of songs by other artists, among them "What Goes On" by The Velvet Underground, "Little Wing" by Neil Young, and "Three Little Birds" by Bob Marley. On most of the songs, Mitchell is accompanied by family members. The liner notes include personal stories from the artist, but no lyrics.

The song "Little Bird, Little Bird" was used in the Futurama episode "Lethal Inspection". Her version of "Three Little Birds" appears in the first episode of the HBO TV series Watchmen.

== Track listing ==
1. "Little Liza Jane" (Arr. Elizabeth Mitchell) — 2:24
2. "Who's My Pretty Baby" (Woody Guthrie) — 1:53
3. "Zousan (Little Elephant)" — 1:38
4. "Little Bird, Little Bird" — 2:28
5. "Three Little Birds" (Bob Marley) — 2:34
6. "What Goes On" (Lou Reed) — 2:54
7. "Pom Na Tu Ri (Springtime Outing)" — 1:20
8. "Buckeye Jim" (Arr. Elizabeth Mitchell) — 2:01
9. "Peace Like a River" — 2:57
10. "Los Pollitos (The Little Chicks)" — 1:50
11. "Winter's Come and Gone" (David Rawlings, Gillian Welch) — 1:59
12. "Little Wing" (Neil Young) — 2:38
13. "Lily Pond" (Vashti Bunyan) — 0:59
14. "The North Wind" — 0:38
15. "If You Listen" (Micky Jones, Tommy Brown) — 3:11
16. "Down in the Valley" — 2:22
17. "Grassy Grass Grass" (Woody Guthrie) — 0:56

== Critical reception ==
Warren Truit, in School Library Journal, called the album "a superb and eclectic group of songs performed uniquely, yet flawlessly."
