= The Way It Really Is =

Studio album by Lisa Loeb
- Released: August 10, 2004
- Genre: Folk
- Length: 37:07
- Label: Zoë
- Producer: Lisa Loeb, Dave Bassett, Chad Fischer, John Shanks, Dweezil Zappa, Jimmy Harry

Lisa Loeb chronology
Catch the Moon (2003)	The Way It Really Is (2004)	The Very Best of Lisa Loeb (2005)

The Way It Really Is is the fifth solo album by Lisa Loeb, released in 2004 by Zoë/Rounder.

The album’s title originated from a previous song of the same name from her third album Cake and Pie in 2002, despite that song not appearing on this album.

== Reception ==
Professional ratings
Review scores
Source	Rating
AllMusic	4/5 stars
Entertainment Weekly	B
Rolling Stone	3/5 stars

Although the album was not as commercially successful as its predecessors, it was very well received by some critics who noted on the mature and strong writing by Loeb, with Stephen Thomas Erlewine calling it "the best, most cohesive record she's made, a clean, crisp collection of well-crafted, gentle tunes that slowly, surely work into the subconscious."

== Track listing ==
1. "Window Shopping" (Dave Bassett, Lisa Loeb) – 3:17
2. "I Control the Sun" (Dave Bassett, Loeb) – 3:01
3. "Hand-Me-Downs" (Stephanie Bentley, Loeb) – 3:42
4. "Fools Like Me" (Loeb, Shelly Peiken, John Shanks) – 3:38
5. "Try" (Loeb) – 4:13
6. "Diamonds" (Loeb) – 3:04
7. "Would You Wander" (Loeb, Maia Sharp) – 3:33
8. "Probably" (Jimmy Harry, Loeb, Billy Steinberg) – 3:04
9. "Accident" (Loeb) – 4:04
10. "Lucky Me" (Loeb) – 2:29
11. "Now I Understand" (Loeb, Dweezil Zappa) – 3:07

Bonus track on the Japanese edition

12. "This Isn't Happening"

== Personnel ==
- Chad Fischer - producer (tracks 3, 9), engineer (tracks 3, 7, 9), piano on "Hand-Me-Downs"
- Larry Goldings - piano on "Accident"
- Mark Meadows - bass (tracks 1, 2, 6, 8, 11)
- Dweezil Zappa - electric guitar (tracks 2, 6, 11)
