= Let's Forget About It =

1998 single by Lisa Loeb

Single by Lisa Loeb

from the album Firecracker
- Released: March 24, 1998
- Length: 2:45
- Label: Geffen
- Songwriter: Lisa Loeb
- Producers: Juan Patiño; Lisa Loeb

Lisa Loeb singles chronology
"I Do" (1997)	"Let's Forget About It" (1998)	"Underdog" (2002)

"Let's Forget About It" is a song by American singer-songwriter Lisa Loeb, released as the second single from her second solo album, Firecracker.

== Reception ==
The single peaked at number 71 on the US Billboard Hot 100 and entered the top 30 in Canada and Iceland.

The song was later included on Loeb's 2006 greatest hits album, The Very Best of Lisa Loeb.

== Track listings ==
US single

1. "Let's Forget About It" – 2:50
2. "I Do" (Rythm Remix) – 3:42

European single

1. "Let's Forget About It" – 2:50
2. "Furious Rose" (Orchestral Version) – 3:25

European Maxi-single

1. "Let's Forget About It" (LP version) – 2:50
2. "Furious Rose" (Orchestral Version) – 3:25
3. "I Do" (Rythm Remix) – 3:42

== Charts ==
Chart (1998)	Peak position
Canada Top Singles (RPM)	21
Canada Adult Contemporary (RPM)	34
Germany (GfK)	100
Iceland (Íslenski Listinn Topp 40)	23
US Billboard Hot 100	71
US Adult Pop Airplay (Billboard)	38
US Pop Airplay (Billboard)	39
