= Number 1 Single =

US television program

#1 Single
- Developed by: Stick Figure Productions
- Starring: Lisa Loeb; Debbie Loeb; Stephanie Ittleson; Gail Loeb; Illeana Douglas; Juan Patino; Michael Panes
- Narrated by: Lisa Loeb
- Country of origin: United States
- No. of episodes: 8

Production
- Executive producers: Steven Cantor; Daniel Laikind
- Camera setup: Single-camera
- Running time: 30 minutes

Original release
- Network: E! Entertainment Television
- Release: January 22 – March 19, 2006

#1 Single is a reality-based show that aired on E! Entertainment Television in the United States. The eight-segment program premiered on January 22, 2006 and ended its run on March 19, 2006.

== Synopsis ==
In this reality-based series, all of whose installments she narrated, singer-actress Lisa Loeb documented her life as a single woman in her mid-thirties as she attempted to re-enter the dating scene after two failed relationships, each of which had lasted six years. With the help of her sister Debbie (who was also a singer-actress, and single as well), her longtime friend Stephanie, and ex-boyfriend Juan Patino, Lisa was given advice on how to find love.

But even as she pursued her Mr. Right, she also hoped that, when she did find him, she would finally achieve a goal that she had always dreamed of: having a family of her own. With her musical career and her pursuit of the perfect man causing a little friction in her life, Lisa hoped that she could balance the two in more ways than one.

== Events after the series ended ==
The goal Loeb sought was not achieved as a result of Number 1 Single, as the series of events it documented failed to lead to a long-term romance for her. On January 31, 2009, nearly three years after the series ended, Loeb married Roey Hershkovitz, the music coordinator for Late Night with Conan O'Brien. Loeb gave birth to a baby girl, Lyla Rose Loeb Hershkovitz, on November 29, 2009.
