= Liz and Lisa – Days Were Different =

Liz and Lisa - Days Were Different

Studio album by Liz and Lisa
- Released: 1990

Liz and Lisa chronology
Liz and Lisa - Days Were Different (1990)	Catch the Moon (2003)

Liz and Lisa – Days Were Different is the debut studio album by Liz and Lisa, the collaboration between Elizabeth Mitchell and Lisa Loeb, released in 1990.

== Track listing ==
1. "Tumbling Man"
2. "Yesterday's Child"
3. "Train Songs"
4. "Summer"
5. "Blue World"
6. "Indians"
7. "Dance With the Angels"
8. "Fiesta"
9. "It Takes a Lot to Love Her"
10. "Do You Sleep"
11. "Dancing on Keyes"
12. "River"
