= Feel What U Feel (song) =

Single by Lisa Loeb featuring Craig Robinson

from the album Feel What U Feel
- Released: September 8, 2016
- Recorded: 2016
- Genre: Pop; Children's music
- Length: 4:03
- Label: Furious Rose
- Songwriter(s): Kyler England * Richard James Jacques: Lisa Loeb

Lisa Loeb singles chronology
"Champagne (I'm Ready)" (2015)	"Feel What U Feel" (2016)	"Moon Star Pie (It's Gonna Be Alright)" (2016)

Music video
- "Feel What U Feel" Video on YouTube

"Feel What U Feel" is a song by American musician Lisa Loeb, from her 2016 children's album, Feel What U Feel. The song features guest vocals from the actor/ comedian Craig Robinson.

== Release ==
Loeb unexpectedly announced the release of the song on her Instagram account, and the song was released for a free listen on SoundCloud.

== Composition ==
The song is based on the ideals that she would pass down to her kids. “I wrote this album for what I’d like to pass along to my kids and kids in general,” said Loeb, “For this album, I wrote a song about ‘seeing’ and acknowledging others, in the song ‘Say Hello,’ and for kids to just have their feelings in ‘Feel What U Feel’ and not to judge them.”

== Music video ==
A music video for the song was released, which features Loeb and Robinson with some kids.

== Track listing ==
Digital Download
No.	Title	Length
1.	"Feel What U Feel" (featuring Craig Robinson)	4:03
Total length:		4:03

CD Single
No.	Title	Length
1.	"Feel What U Feel" (featuring Craig Robinson)	4:04
Total length:		4:04

== Charts ==
Chart (2016–18)	Peak position
US Kid Songs (Billboard)	27
