= Debbie Loeb =

American singer-songwriter

- Origin: United States
- Occupations: Singer, songwriter, and actress

Debbie Loeb is an American singer, songwriter, and actress. She is best known for appearing as herself in her sister's reality-based series #1 Single.

== Profile ==
Loeb is best known for her work on MTV as the host of The Debbie Loeb Show, the children's program Debbie Debutante and the Televisa series Lo Mejor del Mundial. She also worked on various Broadway and music projects.

In 2006 Loeb signed a record deal with Ultra Records (the signing of Loeb to the label was featured on #1 Single), which released her first single, "Faraway". The track debuted at number 21 on Billboard's Hot Dance Airplay chart for the week ending March 27, 2006, although a Billboard critic wrote the following month that it "comes across as a trailer-park redux of Lisa." In July 2010 she released "How Does It Feel" with Hi-Maintenance Productions and in April 2013, "So Into You".

She is the sister of Lisa Loeb.
