= Serial Killing 4 Dummys =

Serial Killing 101
- Directed by: Trace Slobotkin
- Written by: Trace Slobotkin
- Produced by: Mathew Davidge; Harry John Trube
- Starring: Thomas Haden Church; Justin Urich; Lisa Loeb; Rick Overton; George Murdock; Corey Feldman; Barbara Niven
- Cinematography: John P. Tarver
- Edited by: Daniel Candib; Richard Candib; Pamela Raymer
- Music by: Jeffery Alan Jones
- Production company: Parlay Productions
- Distributed by: Lionsgate Films
- Release date: 1999
- Running time: 89 minutes
- Country: United States
- Language: English

Serial Killing 4 Dummys (also known as Serial Killing 101) is a 1999 dark comedy film written and directed by Trace Slobotkin and starring Thomas Haden Church and Justin Urich.

== Plot ==
Casey is a troubled teenager who wants to be a serial killer. He teams up with Sasha, his suicidal classmate who wants to be his first victim, to plan his murders. However trouble soon arises when it turns out there's a real serial killer in town who turns his victims into furniture, and that killer is Casey's gym teacher.

== Background ==
The film first screened at film festivals and had limited release in theaters in the late 1990s under the title Serial Killing 101, before its "official" theatrical release in February 2002. When released on video in 2004, it was retitled Serial Killing 4 Dummys.

== Reception ==
Upon its screening in 1998 at the Convergence Film Festival in Rhode Island, The Providence Journal wrote the film was "as fresh as the latest TV news break-in report." and "In the real world of schoolground slayings, Serial Killing 4 Dummys is in very bad taste. But that's the point. This black comedy, filled with barbed irony, is about the disaffected and talentless, who only see headline-grabbing mayhem as their way out of their personal ruts. And it shoves our noses in it."

Beyond Hollywood wrote "the movie is much better than it really has any right to be", and that as both writer and director, Trace Slobotkin "oftentimes manages to ascend beyond the constraints of the movie." They note that the film is not without its issues, and that the background issue of there being a real serial killer at work does not begin to make its impact until after the first 20 minutes.

== Partial cast ==
- Thomas Haden Church as Vince Grimaldi
- Justin Urich as Casey Noland
- Lisa Loeb as Sasha Fitzgerald
- Rick Overton as Mr. Korn
- George Murdock as Detective Ray Berro
- Corey Feldman as Store Clerk
- Barbara Niven as Donna Noland
- Stuart Stone as Amil
- Raymond O'Connor as Frank
- Esther Scott as Sally Lindon
- Chris Weber as Mark Pekla
- Mark Thompson as Chuck, Weatherman
- Jennifer Loto as Marni Greenstein
- Michael Alaimo as Mr. Rabino
- Tegan West as Detective Pessin
