= You Are My Flower =

Studio album by Elizabeth Mitchell
- Released: December 19, 1998
- Genre: Children's music, folk
- Length: 24:50
- Label: Little Bird Records

Elizabeth Mitchell chronology
You Are My Flower (1998)	You Are My Sunshine (2002)

You Are My Flower is the first children's music album by Elizabeth Mitchell, released in 1998 by Little Bird Records.

== Track listing ==
1. "This Little Light of Mine" — 2:07
2. "You Are My Flower" — 2:46
3. "John the Rabbit" — 0:57
4. "One Day, Two Days, Three Days Old" — 1:56
5. "Freight Train" — 2:58
6. "Shoo-Fly" — 1:03
7. "Little Sack of Sugar" — 1:55
8. "Rock & Roll" — 1:20
9. "Jingle Bells" — 1:59
10. "Lovers Lane" — 2:37
11. "Sylvie" — 2:43
12. "Pony Boy" — 2:29
