= No Fairy Tale =

- Japanese release cover; other markets feature a black-and-white photo of Loeb looking to the camera

Studio album by Lisa Loeb
- Released: December 12, 2012
- Genre: Alternative rock, pop punk
- Length: 41:30
- Language: English
- Label: 429
- Producer: Chad Gilbert; Lisa Loeb

Lisa Loeb chronology
Camp Lisa (2008)	No Fairy Tale (2012)	Nursery Rhyme Parade! (2016)

No Fairy Tale is the seventh solo studio album by Lisa Loeb, released on December 12, 2012 in Japan and January 29, 2013 in North America. The album has received positive critical reception.

== Recording and release ==
No Fairy Tale is Loeb's first album since 2004's The Way It Really Is marketed to adults, after she shifted to recording children's music for several years. On this album, she explores themes of her rise to fame in the music business and personal relationships. Co-producer Chad Gilbert suggested that Loeb explore her breakthrough as an alternative rock star in the 1990s and Loeb agreed, eventually touring to support this album with her former backing band 9 Stories. The album also features Loeb's first cover on an adult album, with two songs composed by Canadian indie rock duo Tegan and Sara.

== Reception ==
Editors at AllMusic Guide gave No Fairy Tale 3.5 out of five stars, with reviewer Mark Deming praising the evolution of Loeb as a songwriter, including her decision to co-write with others and he calls this album "hands down the most fun" of her catalog. Writing for Renowned for Sound, Brandon Veveers gave this album a positive assessment, noting her strengths as a songwriter and performer on several tracks, summing up that it is "a collection containing everything needed for a comeback to be successful".

== Track listing ==
No.	Title	Writer(s)	Producer(s)	Length
1.	"No Fairy Tale"	Lisa Loeb; Maia Sharp	Loeb	2:42
2.	"The 90's"	Loeb; Chad Gilbert	Loeb	2:58
3.	"Weak Day"	Loeb	Loeb	3:27
4.	"Walls"	Loeb; Gilbert		3:27
5.	"A Hot Minute"	Sara Quin; Tegan Quin		2:45
6.	"Sick, Sick, Sick"	Loeb		3:31
7.	"Matches"	Loeb; Morgan Taylor	Loeb	3:40
8.	"Married"	Loeb; Chick Wolverton	Gilbert	3:06
9.	"Swept Away"	Loeb	Loeb; Gilbert	2:53
10.	"He Loved You So Much"	Loeb		4:35
11.	"Ami, I'm Sorry"	Loeb; Marvin Etzioni	Loeb; Gilbert	3:09
12.	"The Worst"	S. Quin; T. Quin	Gilbert	2:10
Total length:				38:19

Japanese CD bonus tracks
No.	Title	Length
13.	"The Holiday Song"	3:31
14.	"Fall Back Guy"	3:37
Total length:		45:37

iTunes bonus track
No.	Title	Length
13.	"First Day of My Life"	3:07
Total length:		41:26

Amazon bonus tracks
No.	Title	Writer(s)	Length
13.	"Sick, Sick, Sick" (Acoustic Alternate)	Loeb	3:30
14.	"Matches" (Acoustic Alternate)	Loeb; Taylor	3:11
15.	"Weak Day" (Acoustic Alternate)	Loeb	3:37

== Personnel ==
- Lisa Loeb – lead vocals, acoustic and electric guitar
- Chad Gilbert – bass guitar (tracks 1, 2, 4, 5, 7, 11, 12), backing vocals (track 2)
- Colin Strahm – drums (tracks 1, 2, 4, 5, 7, 8, 10, 12)
- Jarrod Alexander – drums (tracks 3, 9)
- Paul Miner – bass guitar (tracks 3, 6, 8–10)
- Chick Wolverton – shaker (tracks 3, 4), tambourine (track 9)
- Brad Wood – piano (tracks 3, 7), drums (track 6), synthesizer (track 8), additional guitar (track 9), organ (tracks 9, 11), shaker (track 11)
- Tegan Quin – harmony vocals (tracks 5, 12)
- Tess Fowler – cover illustration

== See also ==
- List of 2012 albums
- List of 2013 albums
