= Lullaby Girl =

Studio album by Lisa Loeb
- Released: October 6, 2017
- Genre: Folk
- Length: 41:16
- Label: Furious Rose Productions

Lisa Loeb chronology
Feel What U Feel (2016)	Lullaby Girl (2017)	A Simple Trick to Happiness (2020)

Singles from Lullaby Girl
- 1. "Don't Stop" Released: October 6, 2017; 2. "O-o-h Child" Released: October 12, 2017; 3. "Rainbow Connection" Released: February 1, 2018

Lullaby Girl is a studio album by American musician Lisa Loeb. The album was released under Furious Rose Productions label on October 6, 2017.

== Composition ==
The album is a compilation of cover songs, as well as two originals. While being a mostly acoustic album, as seen on Loeb's music videos, the album is meant to be peaceful, melodic, and whimsical to the ear.

== Recording ==
Lullaby Girl features a quartet led by keyboardist Larry Goldings. The album includes Loebs and Goldings's arrangements of Dionne Warwick's "What the World Needs Now Is Love", the Five Stairsteps's "O-o-h Child", and Fleetwood Mac's "Don't Stop".

== Track listing ==
No.	Title	Length
1.	"Be My Baby"	3:11
2.	"Don't Stop"	3:21
3.	"Close Your Eyes"	2:54
4.	"Dream a Little Dream"	3:12
5.	"In My Room"	4:13
6.	"O-o-h Child"	3:34
7.	"Rainbow Connection"	3:55
8.	"All the Pretty Little Horses"	2:38
9.	"Lullaby Girl"	2:07
10.	"Inch Worm"	4:03
11.	"What the World Needs Now Is Love"	2:56
12.	"A Dream Is a Wish Your Heart Makes"	2:25
13.	"Tomorrow"	2:47

Target Edition
No.	Title	Length
14.	"I Shall Be Released"	3:19
15.	"This Album Is Not Yet Over"	0:08
