= Nursery Rhyme Parade! =

Studio album by Lisa Loeb
- Released: October 16, 2016
- Genre: Children's music, nursery rhyme
- Length: 32:35
- Language: English
- Label: Amazon
- Producer: Rich Jacques

Lisa Loeb chronology
No Fairy Tale (2012)	Nursery Rhyme Parade! (2016)	Feel What U Feel (2016)

Nursery Rhyme Parade! is a children's album by American singer-songwriter Lisa Loeb.

== Release and reception ==
This album continues a series of children's music recordings that Loeb has made, mixed in with music intended for adult audiences. Nursery Rhyme Parade! was produced by Amazon and accompanied by a 30-minute music video version shot in Hasting Studios for Amazon Prime. Loeb also promoted the release with live sing-along performances for families.

The album was reviewed by Nick Maslow of People, who called it a collection that children "are sure to love" for Loeb's "new spin" on the familiar songs.

== Track listing ==
All songs are traditional compositions

1. "ABC" (a cappella) – 0:23
2. "Jack and Jill" – 1:16
3. "The Muffin Man" – 0:42
4. "This Old Man Intro" (Declan) – 0:10
5. "This Old Man" – 1:58
6. "It's Raining, It's Pouring" – 0:10
7. "Itsy Bitsy Spider" – 0:51
8. "Little Bo Peep" – 0:41
9. "London Bridge" – 0:58
10. "Oh Where, Oh Where Has My Little Dog Gone?" – 0:42
11. "Sing a Song of Sixpence" – 0:41
12. "Row, Row, Row Your Boat" – 0:30
13. "Skip to My Lou" – 1:44
14. "Pop! Goes the Weasel" – 0:54
15. "Peter Piper" – 0:21
16. "Mary Had a Little Lamb" – 1:02
17. "Here We Go Round the Mulberry Bush" – 1:39
18. "Humpty Dumpty" – 0:40
19. "The Farmer in the Dell" – 1:50
20. "I Had a Little Nut Tree" – 1:04
21. "Baa, Baa Black Sheep" – 0:34
22. "Ring Around the Rosie" – 0:19
23. "Three Little Kittens" – 1:50
24. "Mary, Mary, Quite Contrary" – 0:38
25. "Hey Diddle Diddle" – 0:39
26. "Hickory Dickory Dock" – 0:25
27. "A-Tisket A-Tasket" – 0:51
28. "Pease Porridge Hot" – 0:44
29. "There Was a Crooked Man" – 0:14
30. "Diddle Diddle Dumpling" – 0:43
31. "Yankee Doodle" – 0:39
32. "Star Light, Star Bright" (Lyla) – 0:23
33. "Twinkle, Twinkle Little Star" – 1:06
34. "Hush, Little Baby" – 1:08
35. "Little Boy Blue" – 1:16
36. "ABC" – 1:00

== Personnel ==
- Lisa Loeb – guitar, vocals
- Rich Jacques – production
- Luke Joerger – direction and production for video release
- Renee Stahl – vocals
- Ekaterina Trukhan – cover art

== See also ==
- List of 2015 albums
