= I Do (Lisa Loeb song) =

1997 single by Lisa Loeb

Single by Lisa Loeb

from the album Firecracker
- B-side: "Jake" (alternative version)
- Released: October 14, 1997
- Studio: Various (New York City, Los Angeles)
- Genre: Pop
- Length: 3:41
- Label: Geffen
- Songwriter: Lisa Loeb
- Producers: Juan Patiño; Lisa Loeb

Lisa Loeb singles chronology
"Waiting for Wednesday" (1996)	"I Do" (1997)	"Let's Forget About It" (1997)

Music video
- "I Do" on YouTube

"I Do" is a song written and performed by American singer-songwriter Lisa Loeb. Released on October 14, 1997, as the lead single from her second album, Firecracker (1997), the song peaked at number 17 on the US Billboard Hot 100, becoming Loeb's second-highest-charting single, after her number-one debut single, "Stay (I Missed You)". In Canada, "I Do" gave Loeb her second number-one hit, after "Stay". "I Do" was her last top-20 hit in both countries.

== Lyrics and composition ==
On the surface, the song seems to be about "the realization that a person isn't right for you, that the relationship has gone bad". However, the real intention of the song is different according to the liner notes for The Very Best of Lisa Loeb: "We were almost finished recording the album, Firecracker, and the record company told us that we still needed a single. I decided to write a song that sounded like a song about a relationship but was actually about the record company not 'hearing' a single on the record already. You can hear it in the lyrics, 'You can't hear it, but I do.' The song ended up being an expression of strength and power even when someone's not treating you right."

== Reception ==
The song was warmly greeted by Billboard magazine, which called the melody and chorus "nothing short of pure pop bliss."

== Music video ==
In the music video, directed by Phil Harder in Minneapolis, it shows scenes of Lisa Loeb in black and white singing on an upside-down microphone and also lying down on the feather floor (like in the album's cover) then singing and playing guitar in a psychedelic room with several dancers around her. It also features paintings of her as well as the lyrics in some scenes (during Pop-up Video, the words would pop up in the same font as the words in the drawings, and the "I will" parts have the percentages).

== Track listings ==
US CD and cassette single, UK cassette single

1. "I Do"
2. "Jake" (alternative version)

European CD single

1. "I Do" (LP version)
2. "Do You Sleep?" (live)

UK, Australian, and Japanese CD single

1. "I Do" (LP version) – 3:41
2. "Do You Sleep?" (live) – 3:35
3. "Jake" (alternative version) – 3:00

== Credits and personnel ==
Credits are lifted from the Firecracker album booklet.

Studios

- Recorded at various studios in New York City and Los Angeles with Pro Tools 4.0
- Mixed at Mix This! (Pacific Palisades, California)
- Mastered at Sterling Sound (New York City)

Personnel

- Lisa Loeb – writing, lead and harmony vocals, acoustic guitar, production
- Juan Patiño – harmony vocals and loops, production, engineering
- Tony Berg – electric guitars
- Leland Sklar – bass
- John "JR" Robinson – drums
- Bob Clearmountain – mixing
- David Bianco – basic track engineering
- Ryan Freeland – additional engineering (Mix This!)
- Ted Jensen – mastering

== Charts ==
=== Weekly charts ===
Chart (1997–1998)	Peak position
Australia (ARIA)	85
Canada Top Singles (RPM)	1
Canada Adult Contemporary (RPM)	3
Canada Rock/Alternative (RPM)	13
Europe Airplay (European Hit Radio)	22
Germany (GfK)	81
Quebec (ADISQ)	6
UK Singles (Official Charts)	83
US Billboard Hot 100	17
US Adult Alternative Airplay (Billboard)	2
US Adult Contemporary (Billboard)	22
US Adult Pop Airplay (Billboard)	3
US Pop Airplay (Billboard)	11

=== Year-end charts ===
Chart (1998)	Position
Canada Top Singles (RPM)	35
Canada Adult Contemporary (RPM)	40
US Billboard Hot 100	58
US Adult Top 40 (Billboard)	24
US Mainstream Top 40 (Billboard)	39
US Triple-A (Billboard)	15

== Release history ==
Region	Date	Format(s)	Label(s)	Ref.
United States	October 14, 1997	CD	Geffen	
Japan	October 28, 1997	CD	Geffen	
United States	October 30, 1997	Top 40; hot and modern AC; triple A; modern rock radio	Geffen	
United Kingdom	February 2, 1998	CD; cassette	Geffen	
