= Firecracker (Lisa Loeb album) =

Studio album by Lisa Loeb
- Released: November 11, 1997
- Recorded: 1997
- Genre: Pop rock
- Length: 46:14
- Label: Geffen
- Producers: Juan Patiño; Lisa Loeb

Lisa Loeb chronology
| Tails (1995) | Firecracker (1997) | Cake and Pie (2002) |

Singles from Firecraker
- 1. "I Do" Released: October 14, 1997; 2. "Let's Forget About It" Released: 1997

Firecracker is the second solo studio album by Lisa Loeb. It was released in 1997 through Geffen Records. Its cover features original artwork by illustrator Mark Miller, who transposed Loeb on to one of his original artworks, "Kitten".

== Composition and production ==
Loeb frames Firecracker as "sort of a sequel" to her first album Tails, noting, for example, that the song "Split Second" "evolved musically out of the previous album's 'Taffy'".

The album was produced with Juan Patino, "with an ear for greater 'orchestration'" to reflect the dual influence of classical music and 70s pop on Loeb. She cited two things as particularly influential on the composition of the album: touring with Lyle Lovett and performing at the inaugural Lilith Fair festival.

== Reception ==
Professional ratings
Review scores
| Source | Rating |
|---|---|
| AllMusic | 3/5 stars |
| Chicago Tribune | 3.5/4 stars |
| Entertainment Weekly | C |
| Pitchfork | 8.8/10 |
| Rolling Stone | 2.5/5 stars |
| The Rolling Stone Album Guide | 3/5 stars |
| Spin | 5/10 |
| Uncut | 3/5 stars |
| Wall of Sound | 42/100 |

The album was met with mixed reviews upon release. Rolling Stone labeled it a "disappointing" return that felt like "the sound of a songwriter stumbling toward adulthood with a sophomore's two left feet". Entertainment Weekly declared it a "well-crafted but largely soporific" that "could have benefited from some extra gunpowder". Spin, meanwhile, found it "underwhelming and middlebrow, overproduced and pointlessly moody". The album was nominated for the 1999 Grammy Award for Best Engineered Album, Non-Classical.

== Commercial performance ==
Firecracker was certified Gold in the U.S., Canada, and Japan.

The first single from the album, "I Do" hit #17 on the U.S. Billboard Hot 100, her third top-20 single after "Stay (I Missed You)" and "Do You Sleep?". The single also hit #1 in Canada.

The follow-up single, "Let's Forget About It" hit #71 in the U.S. and #21 in Canada. "Truthfully" was also issued as a single in Japan.

== Use in popular culture ==
The song, "How", was used in the feature films, Twister and Jack Frost.

== Track listing ==
All tracks are written by Lisa Loeb, except where indicated.

| No. | Title | Writer(s) | Length |
|---|---|---|---|
| 1. | "I Do" | | 3:39 |
| 2. | "Falling in Love" | | 4:05 |
| 3. | "Truthfully" | | 2:58 |
| 4. | "Let's Forget About It" | Loeb; Juan Patiño | 2:43 |
| 5. | "How" | | 3:49 |
| 6. | "Furious Rose" | | 3:22 |
| 7. | "Wishing Heart" | | 2:52 |
| 8. | "Dance with the Angels" | | 3:38 |
| 9. | "Jake" | | 3:03 |
| 10. | "This" | | 3:28 |
| 11. | "Split Second" | | 2:37 |
| 12. | "Firecracker" | | 5:43 |
| Total length: | | | 46:14 |

Bonus track on European and Japanese edition
| No. | Title | Length |
|---|---|---|
| 13. | "Guessing Game" | 4:02 |

Additional bonus track on Japanese edition
| No. | Title | Length |
|---|---|---|
| 14. | "Eno Ambient #5" | 3:21 |

== Charts ==
Chart performance for Firecracker
| Chart (1997) | Peak position |
|---|---|
| Australian Albums (ARIA) | 182 |
| Canada Top Albums/CDs (RPM) | 53 |
| Japan Album Chart | 10 |
| New Zealand Albums (RMNZ) | 31 |
| Swedish Albums (Sverigetopplistan) | 57 |
| UK Albums (OCC) | 157 |
| US Billboard 200 | 88 |

== Certifications ==
Certifications for Firecracker
| Region | Certification | Certified units/sales |
|---|---|---|
| Canada (Music Canada) | Gold | 50,000^{^} |
| Japan (RIAJ) | Gold | 100,000^{^} |
| United States (RIAA) | Gold | 500,000^{^} |
^{^} Shipments figures based on certification alone.
