= You Are My Sunshine (Elizabeth Mitchell album) =

Studio album by Elizabeth Mitchell
- Released: 2002
- Genre: Children's music, folk
- Label: Little Bird
- Producer: Elizabeth Mitchell and Warren Defever

Elizabeth Mitchell chronology
| You Are My Flower (1999) | You Are My Sunshine (2002) | Catch the Moon (2003) |

You Are My Sunshine is an album by Elizabeth Mitchell released in 2002. The album is a collection of children's music played in various styles, including folk, gospel, reggae and rock. It features covers of a variety of songs by other artists, among them "Hey Bo Diddley" by Bo Diddley, "Car Car" by Woody Guthrie, Cat Stevens' "Here Comes My Baby" and "Goodnight Irene" by Lead Belly.

== Track listing ==
1. So Glad I'm Here
2. Skip To My Lou
3. Ladybug Picnic
4. Hey Bo Diddley
5. Crawdad
6. Alphabet Dub
7. Car Car
8. Ooby Dooby
9. Goin Down the Road
10. Black Jack Baby
11. Jubilee
12. Here Comes My Baby
13. Three Is the Magic Number
14. Froggy Went A Courtin
15. Goodnight Irene
16. You Are My Sunshine
