= Hello Lisa =

Studio album by Lisa Loeb
- Released: October 15, 2002
- Recorded: 2001–2002
- Genre: Pop rock
- Length: 45:27
- Label: Artemis
- Producer: Lisa Loeb

Lisa Loeb chronology
Cake and Pie (2002)	Hello Lisa (2002)	Catch the Moon (2003)

Hello Lisa is the fourth solo studio album by Lisa Loeb, released on October 15, 2002, by Artemis Records. It is a re-release of the album Cake and Pie, which was released by A&M Records earlier that year.

== Overview ==
Loeb's 2002 album Cake and Pie did not receive any major backing or promotion from A&M Records, resulting in it reaching No. 199 on the Billboard 200. Shortly after being dropped by A&M, Loeb purchased the rights to the master recordings of the songs and reworked the album as Hello Lisa. It replaces "We Could Still Belong Together", "Kick Start", "Too Fast Driving", and "She's Falling Apart" with "Did That", "What Am I Supposed to Say", and "Take Me Back".

The album is a homage to the popular character Hello Kitty, of which Loeb is a huge fan. She obtained Sanrio's permission before releasing the album.

== Reception ==
"Underdog" peaked at No. 39 on Billboard's Adult Top 40 chart in the fall of 2002.

== Track listing ==
No.	Title	Writer(s)	Length
1.	"Did That"	Lisa Loeb	3:52
2.	"Underdog"	Loeb; Dweezil Zappa	3:01
3.	"You Don't Know Me"	Loeb; Zappa	3:50
4.	"Drops Me Down"	Loeb	3:00
5.	"Someone You Should Know"	Dave Bassett; Loeb	3:22
6.	"The Way It Really Is"	Glen Ballard; Loeb; Lindy Robbins	3:57
7.	"Bring Me Up"	Loeb	3:29
8.	"Kick Start"	Gary Burr; Loeb	2:47
9.	"What Am I Supposed to Say"	Loeb; Randy Scruggs	3:29
10.	"Payback"	Loeb	4:41
11.	"Take Me Back"	Chad Fischer; Loeb	5:06
12.	"What Am I Supposed to Say" (Acoustic - Hidden track)	Loeb; Scruggs	3:29
Total length:			45:27
