= Liz and Lisa =

US band formed by Lisa Loeb and Elizabeth Mitchell

Liz and Lisa was a band formed by Lisa Loeb and Elizabeth Mitchell while both were enrolled at Brown University in the late 1980s. Both women were in the class of 1990 at Brown. Loeb wrote most of the lyrics and music, and was the principal musician, with Mitchell often taking lead vocals. They recorded a popular tape, with songs such as "Notes and Daisies" "Garden of Delights" and "Hadrian's Wall". Their supporting band at Brown at one point included Duncan Sheik on electric guitar.

Loeb went on to mainstream success with the song "Stay (I Missed You)" on which Mitchell sings backup. Loeb has put out several albums since "Stay".

Mitchell formed the band Ida with Dan Littleton and others in the early 1990s. They have released several albums.

In 2003, Liz and Lisa reunited for the children's album Catch the Moon.

== Albums ==
- Liz and Lisa (1989). Tracks:
1. "Notes and Daisys"
2. "Champagne"
3. "Cinnamon"
4. "Come Back Home"
5. "Garden of Delights"
6. "Bowl and Fishes"
7. "Pocket"
8. "Goin' Somewhere"
9. "Maybe Some Day"
10. "Happy Birthday"
- Days Were Different (1990)
- Catch the Moon (2003)
