= O-o-h Child =

1970 single by the Five Stairsteps

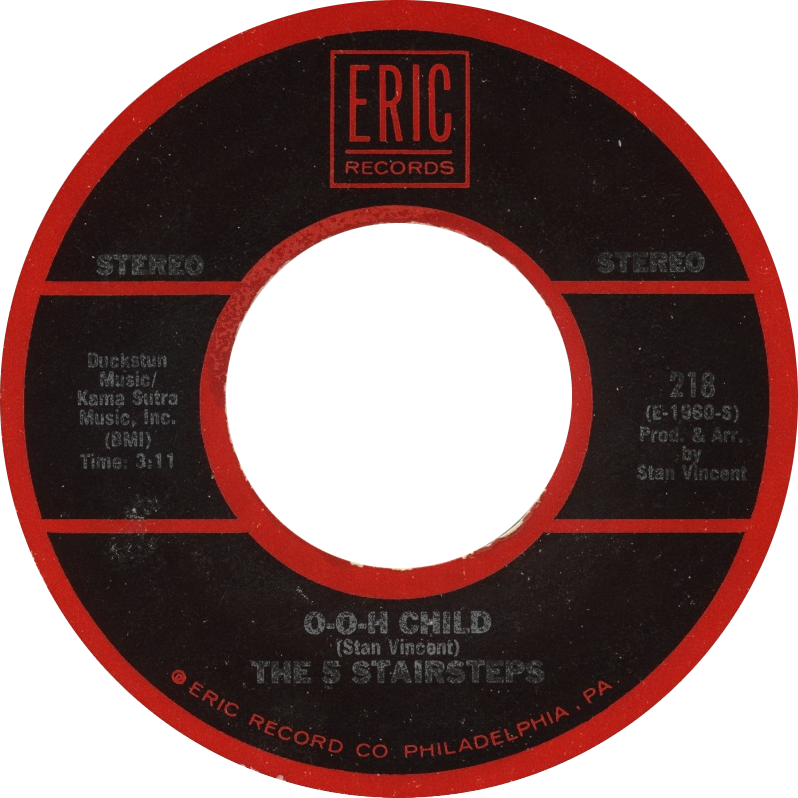
- One of US reissues

Single by Five Stairsteps

from the album Stairsteps
- B-side: "Who Do You Belong To"
- Released: April 1970
- Genre: Pop; R&B; Chicago soul
- Length: 3:11
- Label: Buddah
- Songwriter: Stan Vincent
- Producer: Stan Vincent

Five Stairsteps singles chronology
"Because I Love You" (1970)	"O-o-h Child" (1970)	"Dear Prudence" (1970)

Audio
- "O-o-h Child" on YouTube

"O-o-h Child" is a 1970 single, written by Stan Vincent, recorded by Chicago soul family group the Five Stairsteps and released on the Buddah label.

The Five Stairsteps previously had limited success recording in Chicago with Curtis Mayfield. When Mayfield's workload precluded his continuing to work with the group, they were reassigned to Stan Vincent, an in-house producer for Buddah Records who had recently scored a top-ten hit with the Lou Christie single "I'm Gonna Make You Mine". The Five Stairsteps' debut collaboration with Vincent was the group's rendition of "Dear Prudence" designated as the A-side with Vincent's original composition "O-o-h Child" as B-side. However, "O-o-h Child" broke out in the key markets of Philadelphia and Detroit to rise as high as number 8 on the Billboard Hot 100 in the summer of 1970.

The track's R&B chart impact was muted, peaking at number 14, although in time it came to be regarded as a "soft soul" classic. Billboard ranked the record as the No. 21 song of 1970.

== Song information ==
The Five Stairsteps' only pop Top 40 hit, "O-o-h Child" would be the group's last R&B top 40 hit (they had several top 40 R&B hits in the 1960s) until 1976's "From Us to You". Included on the band's Stairsteps album from 1970, it has become the Stairsteps' signature song and has inspired more than twenty covers since its release. The song featured various members, including lone female member and eldest sister Alohe, brothers Keni, Dennis, James, lead singer Clarence Burke Jr. singing in various parts of the song.

The lyrics tell the listener that "things are gonna get easier" in times of strife. The song's uplifting message helped it to become popular among pop and rhythm and blues audiences when it was released.

The song is ranked number 402 on the Rolling Stone magazine's list of The 500 Greatest Songs of All Time.

== Critical reception ==
AllMusic review by Joe Viglione: "Producer Stan Vincent's Top Ten hit for the Stairsteps, "O-o-h Child," was one of those bright, memorable, sterling songs which, as with Alive 'N Kickin's "Tighter, Tighter," made the summer of 1970 so memorable."

== Charts ==
=== Weekly charts ===
Chart (1970–1971)	Peak position
Canada RPM Top Singles	3
U.S. Billboard Hot 100	8
U.S. Billboard R&B	14
U.S. Cash Box Top 100	4

=== Year-end charts ===
Chart (1970)	Rank
Canada	57
U.S. Billboard Hot 100	21
U.S. Cash Box	40

== Certifications ==
Region	Certification	Certified units/sales
United Kingdom (BPI)	Silver	200,000^{‡}
United States (RIAA)	Gold	1,000,000^{^}
^{^} Shipments figures based on certification alone.^{‡} Sales+streaming figures based on certification alone.

== Cover versions ==
Male solo singer "Dino"'s cover of "O-o-h Child" reached No. 27 on the Billboard Hot 100 in 1993.

In 2005, American pop rock duo Daryl Hall & John Oates released a cover version, as a single from their album Our Kind of Soul.

In 2017, American singer-songwriter Lisa Loeb recorded a cover for her album Lullaby Girl.

== See also ==
- List of 1970s one-hit wonders in the United States
