= A Simple Trick to Happiness =

Studio album by Lisa Loeb
- Released: February 28, 2020
- Recorded: 2019
- Studio: Audio Eagle Studio; Buddhaland; Deathstar Studio
- Genre: Pop
- Length: 34:29
- Label: Furious Rose
- Producer: Rich Jacques; Lisa Loeb

Lisa Loeb chronology
Lullaby Girl (2017)	A Simple Trick to Happiness (2020)

A Simple Trick to Happiness is a studio album by American singer-songwriter Lisa Loeb, released on February 28, 2020. The album is Loeb's most personal and reflects her interest in simple and direct songwriting paired with inspiration from her children and personal life. Loeb was inspired to write positive, uplifting music due to the complexity of modern life and after having written several albums of children's music. The album was preceded by a music video for "Skeleton" in December 2019.

Produced by Loeb and Rich Jacques, A Simple Trick to Happiness is a snapshot that examines life as a mother, wife, artist, and businesswoman seeking to find that rare perfect balance between personal fulfillment and purpose. The album features 11 original songs, co-written with Jacques, Scott Effman, Rosi Golan, Eric Lumiere, and others. The first track "Doesn't It Feel Good" features Michelle Branch on backing vocals.

== Critical reception ==
The editorial staff of AllMusic gave the album four out of five stars, with reviewer Mark Deming calling it, "one of the best and most satisfying albums Lisa Loeb has made to date".

== Track listing ==
No.	Title	Writer(s)	Length
1.	"Doesn't It Feel Good"	Rosi Golan; Rich Jacques; Lisa Loeb	3:38
2.	"Skeleton"	Scott Effman; Jacques; Loeb	3:08
3.	"Another Day"	Yoshi Breen; Jacques; Loeb	3:28
4.	"This Is My Life"	Jacques; Loeb; Tom Rhodes	3:02
5.	"For the Birch"	Loeb; Anna Schulze; Maia Sharp	3:24
6.	"Most of All"	Loeb; Kevin Scott Rhoads	3:26
7.	"Shine"	Effman; Jacques; Loeb	3:14
8.	"Sing Out"	Loeb; Eric Lumiere	3:24
9.	"I Wanna Go First"	Daniel Ahearn; Jacques; Loeb	2:41
10.	"The Upside"	Kyler England; Jacques; Loeb	3:16
11.	"Wonder"	Loeb; Rhoads	1:48
Total length:			34:29

Japanese release bonus tracks
No.	Title	Length
12.	"Close Your Eyes"	2:56
13.	"Lullaby Girl"	2:10

== Personnel ==
- Lisa Loeb – art direction, banjo, guitar, production, vocals

Additional musicians

- Michelle Branch – backing vocals
- Yoshi Breen – piano
- Scott Effman – guitar, ukulele, backing vocals
- Kyler England – backing vocals
- Vanessa Freebairn-Smith – cello
- Rich Jacques – bass guitar, drum programming, engineering, guitar, Mellotron, organ, piano, production, programming, synthesizer, ukulele, backing vocals
- Bill Lefler – snare drums, percussion
- Adam Levy – guitar
- Kevin Scott Rhoads – engineering, piano
- Anna Schulze – backing vocals
- Kazumi Shimokawa – bass guitar, keyboards, Mellotron, piano, ukulele
- Blair Sinta – drums, engineering

Technical personnel

- Hans Dekline – mastering
- Craig Frank – engineering
- Richard Furch – mixing
- Juan Patino – cover photo
- Marc Whitmore – engineering
- Janet Wolsborn – art direction
- Brian Yaskulka – mixing

== See also ==
- List of 2020 albums
