= Feel What U Feel =

Studio album by Lisa Loeb
- Released: October 7, 2016
- Genre: Children's music
- Length: 30:29
- Label: Furious Rose Productions
- Producer: Lisa Loeb

Lisa Loeb chronology
Nursery Rhyme Parade! (2015)	Feel What U Feel (2016)	Lullaby Girl (2017)

Singles from Feel What U Feel
- 1. "Feel What U Feel" Released: September 8, 2016; 2. "Moon Star Pie (It's Gonna Be Alright)" Released: October 7, 2016; 3. "Wanna Do Day" Released: January 12, 2017; 4. "The Sky Is Always Blue" Released: March 13, 2017

Feel What U Feel is a children's album by American musician Lisa Loeb. The album was released on October 7, 2016, and the album's first single was "Feel What U Feel." The album won Best Children's Album at the 60th Annual Grammy Awards.

== Release ==
The album was announced on September 8, 2016 with the release of the lead single "Feel What U Feel," featuring Craig Robinson. The album was then released by Furious Rose Productions on October 7, 2016 as an Amazon Music exclusive.

== Promotion ==
Lisa Loeb Embarked a small tour to promote the Children's album in the Fall of 2016 & Winter of 2017. Despite going on a children's tour, Lisa performed many of her "Adult" and "Older" songs. Lisa also constantly played her songs on "Kids Place Live Radio" for nearly 1 year after release.

== Singles ==
"Feel What U Feel" was released as the album's lead single of September 8, 2016. The second single, "Moon Star Pie (It's Gonna Be Alright)" was released on October 7, 2016. The third single, "Wanna Do Day" ft. Ed Helms was released on January 12, 2017. The fourth and final single of the album, "The Sky Is Always Blue" was released on March 13, 2017.

== Track listing ==
No.	Title	Length
1.	"Moon Star Pie (It’s Gonna Be Alright)"	2:19
2.	"Say Hello"	2:19
3.	"Feel What U Feel" (featuring Craig Robinson)	4:03
4.	"I Was Here"	2:51
5.	"You Can Count On Me"	1:51
6.	"The Sky Is Always Blue"	2:39
7.	"Wiggle"	2:09
8.	"It’s All Right To Cry" (featuring Craig Robinson)	2:23
9.	"Let’s Keep The Band Together"	2:34
10.	"You Have It In You"	2:26
11.	"Wanna Do Day" (featuring Ed Helms)	2:41
12.	"You Can Count On Me (Lullaby)"	2:15
