= Elizabeth Mitchell (musician) =

American singer, songwriter and musician (born 1968)

- Born: 1968 (age 57–58); New York City, New York, U.S.
- Genres: Children's; folk
- Occupations: Singer; songwriter; musician
- Instruments: Vocals; guitar; tambourine
- Years active: 1989–present
- Label: Smithsonian Folkways
- Member of: Liz and Lisa; Ida
- Website: youaremyflower.org

Elizabeth Ardis Mitchell (born 1968) is an American singer, songwriter and musician. She began her career performing with Lisa Loeb as the duo Liz and Lisa, then founded the indie rock band Ida in 1991, of which she continues to be a member. As a solo artist, she has been recording and performing music for children since 1998.

Mitchell was the first children's music artist signed to Smithsonian Folkways in the 21st century. She has released seven albums of children's music, including her 2006 release You Are My Little Bird, which was voted Best Children's Album of 2006 by Amazon.com.

Mitchell has also collaborated with musicians including Levon Helm, Dan Zanes, Ella Jenkins, Jon Langford and Ziggy Marley.

== Early life, family and education ==
Mitchell was born in New York City in 1968. She attended Brown University, graduating in 1990.

== Career ==
=== Early career ===
During her years as a student at Brown, Mitchell formed the band Liz and Lisa with fellow student and singer-songwriter Lisa Loeb, who was also in the class of 1990. The two put out two albums: Liz and Lisa in 1989, and Liz and Lisa – Days Were Different in 1990. Among their backing band was Duncan Sheik, another Brown University student.

Soon after graduating from Brown, Mitchell moved to Brooklyn and got a job as an assistant teacher at the Roosevelt Island Day Nursery School in New York City.

=== 1990–2009 ===
In 1991, Mitchell and Daniel Littleton started recording and performing as a duo. After playing shows with double-bassist Rick Lassiter they recorded a 4-track cassette of their songs. Jenny Toomey, co-owner of Simple Machines Records heard it, and offered to release an album on her label; the result was Tales of Brave Ida in 1994. Littleton's brother Michael joined the band soon afterwards, and Karla Schickele joined in 1996, creating Ida's first classic lineup. They have since released seven studio albums, in addition to various live albums, EPs and compilations.

Mitchell fell into the world of children's music in part by accident. Her first album of children's music, You Are My Flower, was recorded in a single afternoon in 1998 at the home studio of Warren Defever of the band His Name is Alive. It was not intended for commercial release, but after much word of mouth demand, she released the album on her and Daniel's record label, Last Affair Records.

Mitchell sang a duet with Ziggy Marley on his 2009 release Family Time.

=== 2010— ===
Smithsonian Folkways Recordings released Elizabeth Mitchell's album Sunny Day on October 5, 2010. Sunny Day features performances with Mitchell's husband and musical partner, Daniel Littleton, their nine-year-old daughter Storey and Storey's cousins and friends. The album features two original songs written by Storey, and guest performers include Levon Helm, Dan Zanes, Jon Langford (Mekons), and the Children of Agape Choir of South Africa. Songs on the album range from traditional American folk songs, to Japanese and Korean nursery songs, to fresh new arrangements of popular songs.

Her next album, Little Seed, was released in 2012. Little Seed features performances with Mitchell's husband, Daniel Littleton, daughter Storey, as well as other musical friends. The album is dedicated to Mitchell's interpretation of America's musical bard, Woody Guthrie, including the well-known track, "This Land Is Your Land." The album was nominated in the Best Children's Album category for the 55th Annual Grammy Awards.

The album Blue Clouds was released by Smithsonian Folkways in October 2012. Mitchell's inspiration began from a bedtime story that her husband Daniel used to tell her daughter called "Land of the Blue Clouds." As with her previous albums, Mitchell collaborates with her husband Daniel, daughter Storey, and other musical family and friends. The album includes covers from various artists including Jimi Hendrix, David Bowie, and Bill Withers, as well as her own compositions.

You Are My Flower and You Are My Sunshine have since been re-released on Mitchell's own label, Little Bird Records. At the suggestion of artist Dan Zanes, Smithsonian Folkways signed Mitchell as their first new children's music artist of the 21st century.

Her first Christmas album, The Sounding Joy, was released on October 15, 2013. This collection of folk carols draws from Ruth Crawford Seeger's 1953 songbook American Folk Songs for Christmas. The album includes Mitchell's family, friends and neighbors, including Peggy Seeger, Natalie Merchant, Aoife O’Donovan, Amy Helm, John Sebastian, Dan Zanes, Happy Traum, and many others.

== Personal life ==
Mitchell married her longtime Ida bandmate Daniel Littleton in 1999. They have one daughter, Storey, born in New York City in 2001. They live in the Catskill Mountains in New York. Dan is the guitar player for Amy Helm's band, the Handsome Strangers.

== Discography ==
- You Are My Flower - Little Bird Records, 1998
- You Are My Sunshine - Little Bird Records, 2002
- Catch the Moon with Lisa Loeb - Artemis Records, 2004
- You Are My Little Bird - Smithsonian Folkways Recordings, 2006
- Sunny Day - Smithsonian Folkways Recordings, October 2010
- Little Seed: Songs for Children by Woody Guthrie - Smithsonian Folkways Recordings, 2012
- Blue Clouds - Smithsonian Folkways Recordings, 2012
- The Sounding Joy: Christmas Songs In and Out of the Ruth Crawford Seeger Songbook - Smithsonian Folkways Recordings, 2013
- Turn Turn Turn with Dan Zanes, 2013

== In popular culture ==
"Little Bird, Little Bird" from You Are My Little Bird was featured on the sixth episode of season six of Futurama, titled "Lethal Inspection".

"Three Little Birds", from the same album, was featured in the first episode of season one of Watchmen, titled "It's Summer and We're Running Out of Ice".
