= Lisa Loeb =

American musician, author and actress (born 1968)

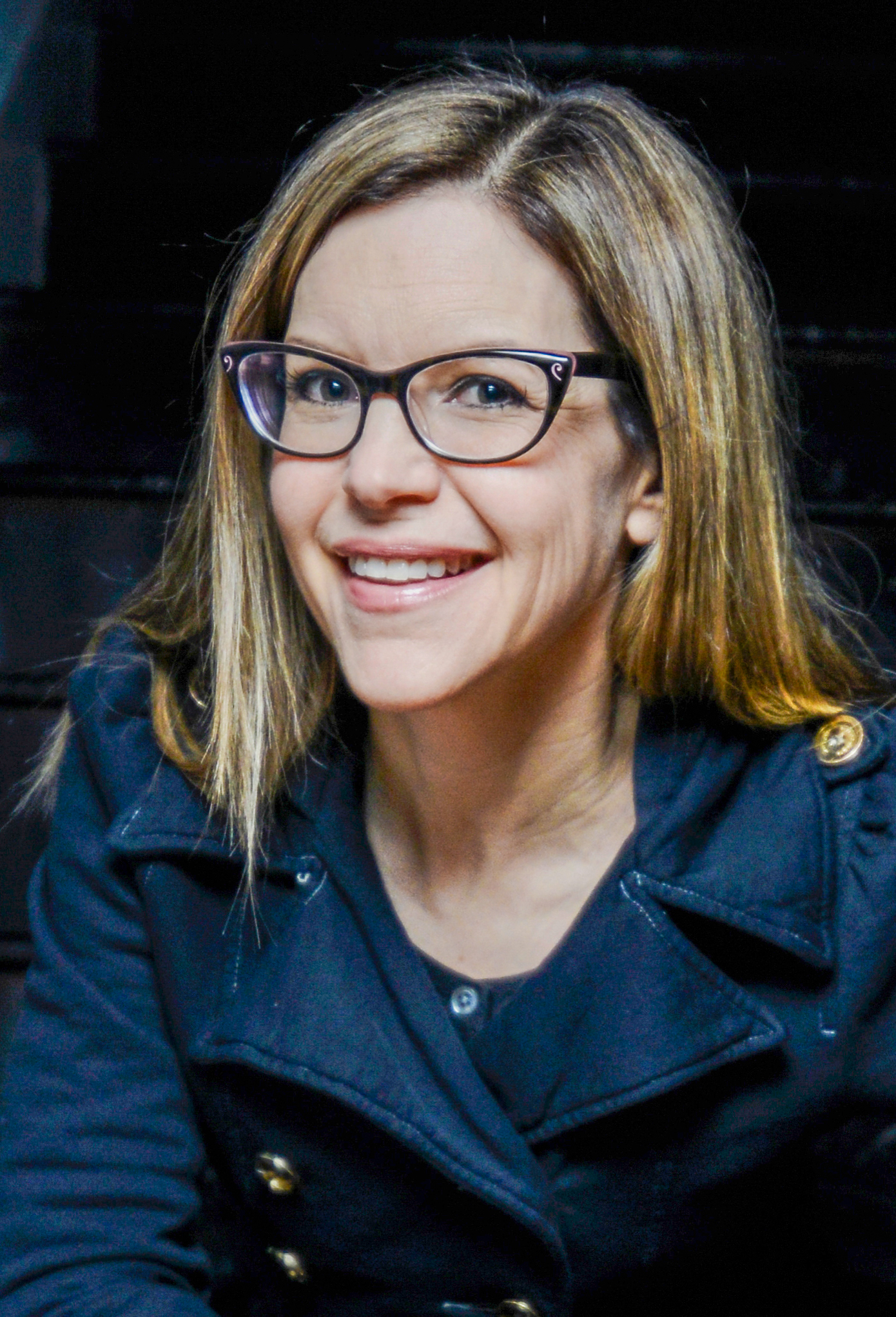
- Loeb in 2013

Background information
- Born: Lisa Anne Loeb; March 11, 1968 (age 58); Bethesda, Maryland, U.S.
- Origin: Dallas, Texas, U.S.
- Genres: Pop; rock; folk; children's music
- Occupations: Singer; songwriter; musician; author; actress
- Instruments: Guitar; vocals
- Years active: 1989–present
- Labels: 429; Geffen; A&M; Artemis; Zoë
- Spouse: Roey Hershkovitz (m. 2009)
- Partner: Dweezil Zappa (1998–2004)
- Website: lisaloeb.com

Lisa Anne Loeb (/loʊb/ LOHB; born March 11, 1968) is an American singer-songwriter, musician, author and actress. She started her career with "Stay (I Missed You)" (1994) from the film Reality Bites, the first number-one single on the Billboard Hot 100 for an artist without a recording contract. She achieved additional top-20 singles with "Do You Sleep?" in 1996 and "I Do" in 1998. Her albums Tails (1995) and Firecracker (1997) were certified gold.

Loeb's film, television and voiceover work includes guest roles in Gossip Girl and Netflix's Fuller House. She also starred in two other television series, Dweezil & Lisa, a weekly culinary adventure for the Food Network that featured her alongside Dweezil Zappa, and #1 Single on E! Entertainment Television. She has acted in such films as House on Haunted Hill, Fright Night, Hot Tub Time Machine 2, and Helicopter Mom.

Loeb has released children's albums and books. Her 2016 album Feel What U Feel won the Grammy Award for Best Children's Music Album. Loeb's latest album, A Simple Trick to Happiness, was released in February 2020. Loeb currently hosts "Stay with Lisa Loeb", on SiriusXM, every weekday.

== Early life and education ==
Lisa Loeb was born to a Jewish family in Bethesda, Maryland, and was raised in Dallas, Texas, where her parents still reside. Her mother, Gail, was the president of the Dallas County Medical Society Alliance and Foundation, and her father, Peter Loeb, was a gastroenterologist. She has a younger sister, songwriter Debbie Loeb. As a child, Loeb studied piano, but later switched to guitar. She attended The Hockaday School, an all-girls private school. For two years, she had her own radio show on 88.5 KRSM-FM, a 10-watt station licensed to the nearby all-boys St. Marks School of Texas. After graduating from high school in 1986, she attended Brown University, where she graduated in 1990 with a degree in comparative literature.

== Music career ==
=== Early years and first bands (1980s–1993) ===
At Brown in the mid-1980s, Loeb and Elizabeth Mitchell formed a band named Liz and Lisa, with future singer/songwriter and classmate Duncan Sheik as a guitarist. The duo released the albums Liz and Lisa (1989) and Liz and Lisa - Days Were Different (1990) independently. After developing a following together, Loeb and Mitchell parted ways a few years after college. Loeb attended Berklee College of Music in Boston for a session of summer school, and in 1990 formed a full band called Nine Stories. The band, which was named after the book by J.D. Salinger, included Tim Bright on guitar, Jonathan Feinberg on drums, and Joe Quigley on bass. Loeb began working with producer Juan Patiño to make the cassette Purple Tape in 1992. It included the earliest recordings of later popular tracks such as "Do You Sleep?", "Snow Day", "Train Songs", and "It's Over". Loeb sold the violet-colored cassette to fans at shows and used it as a sonic calling card to industry gatekeepers. She and her band made a recording of her song "Stay (I Missed You)" during the same period. Loeb developed a following from her solo acoustic performances on the New York City coffeehouse circuit and the rock club circuit. She travelled to cities such as Philadelphia, Los Angeles, and Dallas, but focused on New York City. She played acoustically and with her band in folk and rock clubs, including at CBGB. Loeb performed at music festivals such as the New Music Seminar and South by Southwest.

=== "Stay (I Missed You)" (1994) ===
Loeb's big break came through her friendship with actor Ethan Hawke, who lived in an apartment across the street from her in New York City. She told Cosmopolitan that she met Hawke in the NYC theater community where, as she phrased it, "I made music for his plays". Loeb gave Hawke the Juan Patiño-produced version of "Stay (I Missed You);" he in turn gave it to director Ben Stiller during the making of the 1994 film Reality Bites. Stiller used the song in the film's ending credits, and it was included by Ron Fair on the soundtrack on RCA Records. Hawke directed a rare one-take video on film, a continuous steadicam shot operated by Robin Buerki.

"Stay (I Missed You)" went on to become a number-one hit on the Billboard Hot 100 in the U.S. When her song hit number one, Loeb earned the distinction of being the first artist to top the Hot 100 before signing to a record label. The single reached Gold status on July 12, 1994, just over three months after its release date. Loeb and Nine Stories were nominated for the Grammy Award for Best Pop Performance by a Duo or Group with Vocals, and were named Best International Newcomer in the Brit Awards.

In 2019, Loeb released a limited edition 12" red vinyl pressing of the song for the 25th anniversary of the song. The release included four unreleased versions of "Stay (I Missed You)", "Truthfully", "Waiting for Wednesday", and "I Do", recorded live in January 2013 in Japan.

Loeb appeared at the 25th anniversary screening of Reality Bites at the Tribeca Film Festival, with the film's stars Ethan Hawke, Winona Ryder, Ben Stiller, and Janeane Garofalo, and performed "Stay (I Missed You)" during the film's end credits.

=== Tails and Firecracker (1995–1999) ===
In September 1995, Loeb's debut album, Tails, credited to Lisa Loeb & Nine Stories, was released on Geffen Records. The album was co-produced by Juan Patiño, her then longtime boyfriend. "Stay" was included on the album, and Loeb managed a top 20 hit with "Do You Sleep?" and two moderately successful radio hits with "Taffy" and "Waiting for Wednesday". The album was certified Gold by the RIAA on December 1, 1995. Critics were favorable to the album, with Ken Tucker of Entertainment Weekly, in particular, noting, "Loeb has an undeniable gift for creating an air of intimacy and vulnerability, which may well be enough for 'Stay' fans looking for additional doses of contemplative melancholy". After the release of Tails Tim Bright and Jonathan Feinberg left Nine Stories and were replaced with Mark Spencer and Ronny Crawford respectively.

In 1997, Loeb released a second major-label album on Geffen, Firecracker, and began experimenting more with orchestrations done with Dan Coleman. At this point, Loeb started going under her own name for the albums instead of using the band name, although she still continued to tour worldwide with Nine Stories, as well as acoustically as she had done from the start. Firecracker included hit singles such as "I Do", which received radio success, peaking at No. 17 on the Billboard Hot 100 and music television. The album was certified Gold on June 10, 2008. She subsequently toured with The Wallflowers and Chris Isaak, and performed at Lilith Fair.

=== Guest appearances (2000–2001) ===
In 2000, Loeb participated in the Ozzy Osbourne tribute album Bat Head Soup, performing "Goodbye to Romance" with Dweezil Zappa on guitar. She contributed to An All Star Tribute To Cher with "Gypsies, Tramps and Thieves", and to An All Star Tribute To Shania Twain with "Don't Be Stupid", both of which were released in 2005. Other international work includes Loeb's guest performance on the song "Anti-Hero" for an all-female Japanese musical group Rin''s album Inland Sea. Loeb contributed vocals to New Found Glory's cover of "Stay", from their 2007 LP From the Screen to Your Stereo Part II, as well as performing the song live with the band.

Beginning with Reality Bites, Loeb's music has been featured in several soundtracks. The single "How" was included on the soundtracks for films Twister and Jack Frost, and was heard in the Buffy the Vampire Slayer episode "Homecoming". "We Could Still Belong Together" earned a spot on the Legally Blonde soundtrack in 2001, while "I Wish" can be heard on the soundtrack for Anywhere But Here (1999).

=== Cake and Pie (2002) ===
Cake and Pie, Loeb's third album and debut for A&M/Interscope, was released in 2002. She co-produced the album and collaborated with Glen Ballard, then boyfriend Dweezil Zappa, Randy Scruggs (Vince Gill, Sawyer Brown, Waylon Jennings), and Peter Collins (Rush, Bon Jovi, Indigo Girls). It peaked at 199 on the Billboard Charts.

In mid-2002, Loeb signed a deal with Artemis Records, a new boutique label run by record company veterans Danny Goldberg and Daniel Glass, after Interscope allowed her to buy the rights to her masters. Artemis had offered to re-release the record with more promotion. With new artwork, some songs added and some removed, Cake and Pie was re-launched as Hello Lisa, a play on Sanrio's signature Hello Kitty, who appears on the album cover wearing Lisa Loeb's trademark glasses.

She released an EP with just the new songs on it, as well as an alternative version of the song "Underdog" for fans who had already purchased the Cake and Pie CD. She co-directed a video with Dweezil Zappa for "Underdog" co-starring Hello Kitty playing guitar. Loeb toured the world again, making special stops in Sanrio stores for in-store autographs while appearing with Hello Kitty at the Japanese MTV Music Awards.

=== Catch the Moon album (2003) ===
In 2003, Loeb reunited with her college music partner Elizabeth Mitchell on children's CD and companion book Catch the Moon through Artemis Records. According to Allmusic, "The songs are rendered in a folk/country acoustic minimalism that is, in a word, enchanting." Videos from this album, as well as the single "Jenny Jenkins", have been featured on the Noggin TV network for children.

=== The Way It Really Is (2004) ===
In 2003, Loeb voiced the role of Mary Jane Watson in Spider-Man: The New Animated Series, which ran for one season on MTV.

In 2004, Loeb signed to the more experienced and established independent label Zoë/Rounder Records. The Way It Really Is was released August 2004 as Loeb's fifth studio album, based on the song "The Way It Really Is". Although the album was not as commercially successful as its predecessors, critics noted the mature and strong writing by Loeb. Stephen Erlewine called it "the best, most cohesive record she's made, a clean, crisp collection of well-crafted, gentle tunes that slowly, surely work into the subconscious."

=== The Very Best of Lisa Loeb, Purple Tape, Camp Lisa album and non-profit (2006–2008) ===
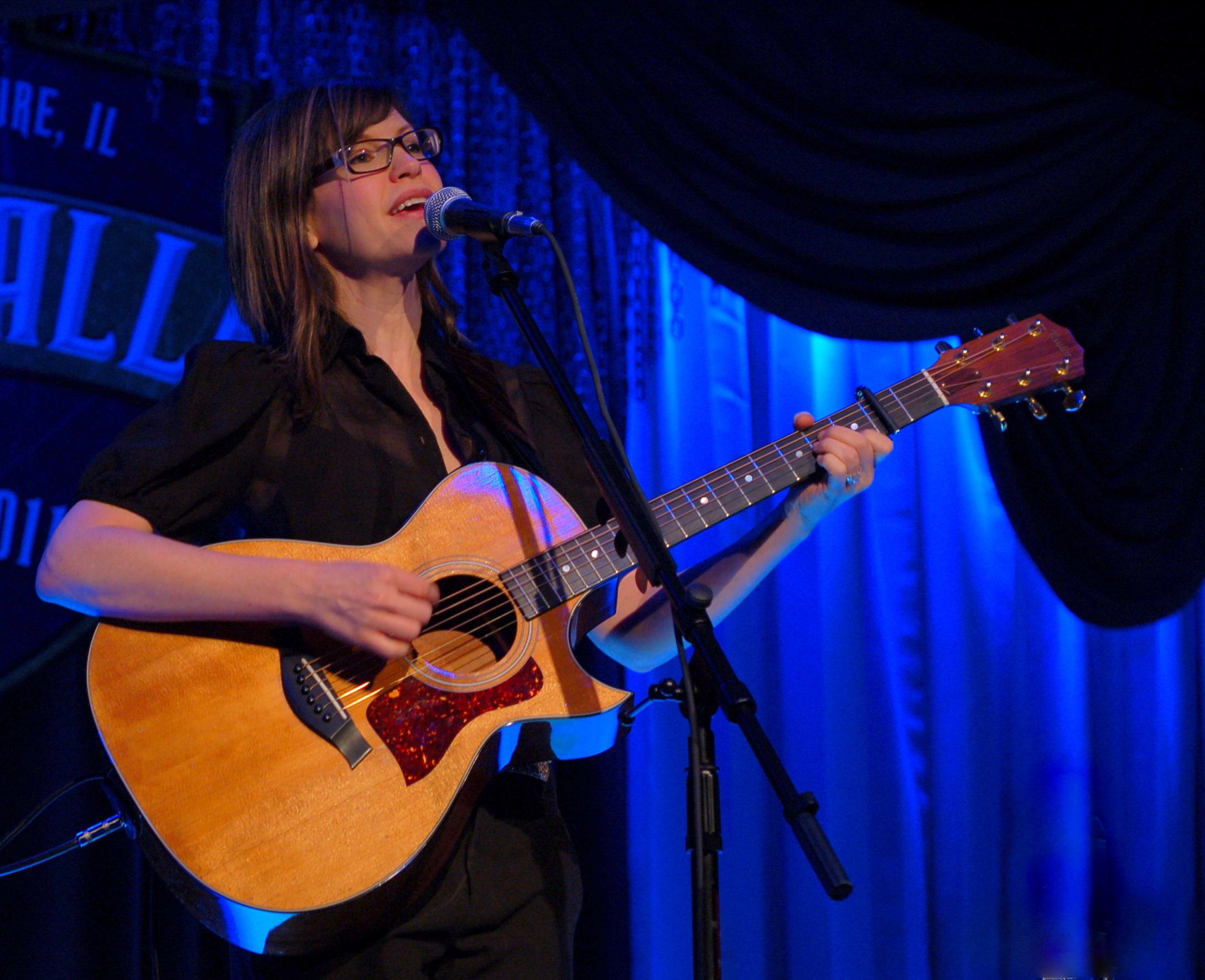
Performing in Chicago, 2011

Her greatest hits compilation, The Very Best of Lisa Loeb, was released through Universal in January 2006 as well as a Japanese version of the album. Loeb was a judge for the 1st and 8th annual Independent Music Awards to support independent artists.

In 2006, Loeb contributed to the album A World of Happiness, designed to disseminate messages of kindness, compassion, tolerance, and self-reliance to children of all ages. She performed as Lady Leonali the Ladybug singing "In the Details".

In 2008, she released her Purple Tape album remixed and remastered on a double CD. It included an interview by Andy Denemark, highlighting the creative process behind each song. There were extensive liner notes and photos documenting her early history in New York City. That same year, she released Camp Lisa, which was also released by Loeb's own Furious Rose Productions with distribution through Redeye, and produced by Loeb with Michelle Lewis and Dan Petty. The disc includes a mix of 21 original and classic camp songs and guest performers including Kay Hanley, Dave Gibbs, Nina Gordon, Jill Sobule, Lee Sklar, Maia Sharp, and funnyman/banjo player Steve Martin.

As Loeb spent many summers of her childhood at summer camp, Camp Lisa is inspired by her camp memories as well as 1970s-style rock and pop. Camp Lisa garnered National Parenting Publications Awards Honors, 2008 Parents' Choice and NPR's year-end Top 10 list of the best kids' music for 2008. In July 2010, she debuted her children's musical Camp Kappawanna, which is based on the songs from Camp Lisa.

In conjunction with Camp Lisa, she launched her own non-profit, The Camp Lisa Foundation, designed to help underprivileged kids attend summer camp through its partnership with SCOPE (Summer Camp Opportunities Promote Education, Inc.) In 2009, The Camp Lisa Foundation provided funding for many camp scholarships, enabling economically disadvantaged children to attend ACA-accredited overnight camps.

=== Lisa Loeb's Silly Sing-Along and Songs for Movin' and Shakin' books, No Fairy Tale and touring (2011–2014) ===
In September 2011, Loeb released the children's book Lisa Loeb's Silly Sing-Along: The Disappointing Pancake and Other Zany Songs, illustrated by Ryan O'Rourke. The book was published by Sterling Publishing, and also includes activities, choreography, and recipes. The book is published with an included CD, with four original songs and six classics.

Her seventh studio album No Fairy Tale was released on January 29, 2013, by 429 Records, co-produced by Chad Gilbert and Loeb herself. She released the original single "A Holiday Song" through Furious Rose Productions on December 10, 2013. Loeb toured with and without her band, touring with Daru Oda and Adam Levy. Other band members include Mark Spencer, Matt Beck, Ronny Crawford, Joe Quigley, Joe Travers, Mark Meadows, Michael Eisenstein, Dave Gibbs, and Leland Sklar. In September 2014, she performed at the Billboard Live venues in Tokyo and Osaka. During the performances she ended with a rendition of her new song "3, 2, 1, Let Go". On December 9, 2014, she released the original single "Light". The Hanukkah song tells a "story of hope in the darkness", and was co-written by Loeb and Cliff Goldmacher, with Renee Stahl on guest vocals. The song was put in rotation on SiriusXM among other stations.

In April 2013, Loeb released the follow-up book Lisa Loeb's Songs for Movin' and Shakin': The Air Band Song and Other Toe-Tapping Tunes, which she co-wrote with Ryan O'Rourke. It includes both covers and some original songs, as well as a CD.

=== Camp Kappawanna musical and Nursery Rhyme Parade! album and video (2015) ===
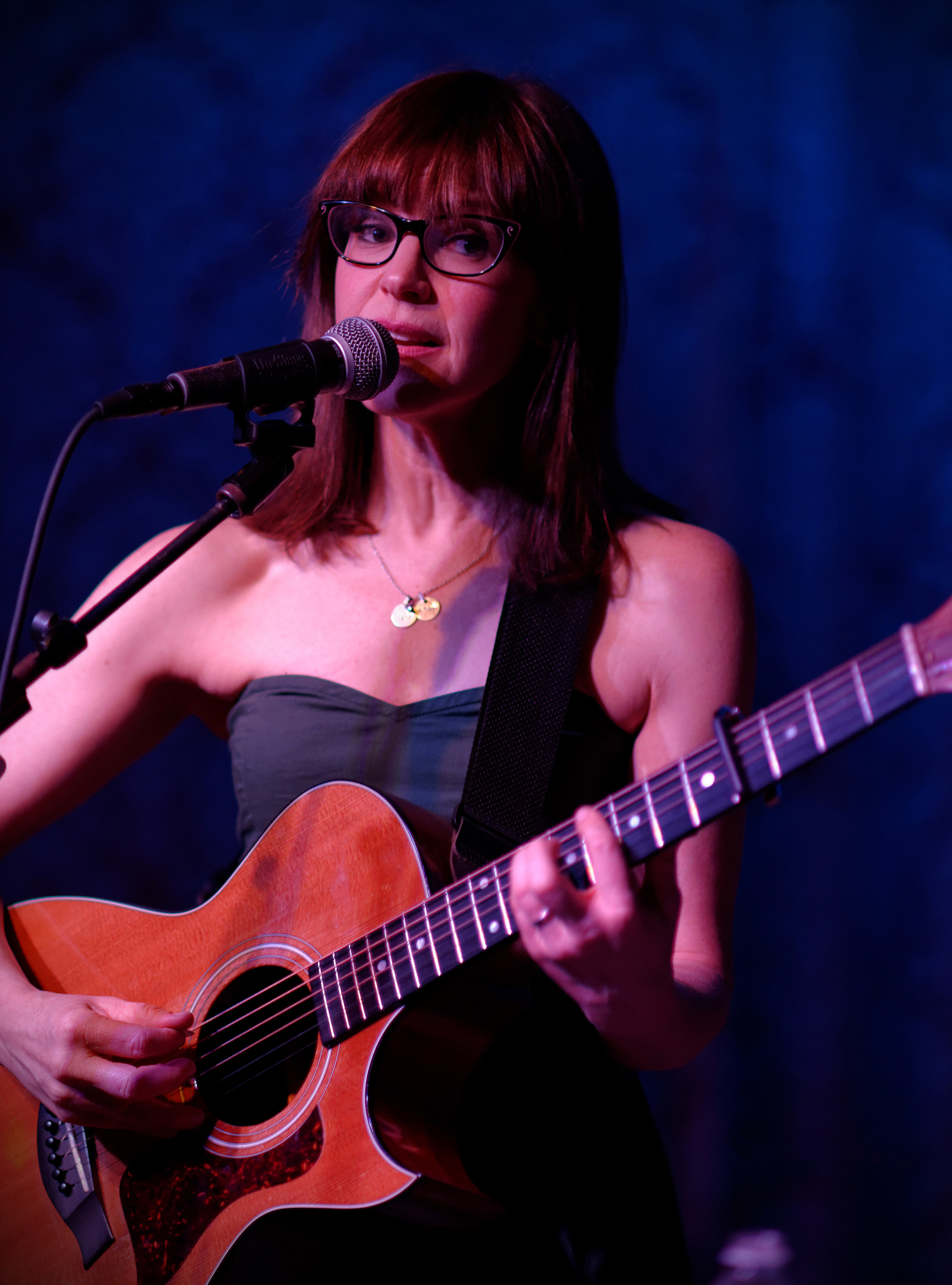
Loeb performing in 2015

She co-wrote the lyrics and co-composed the music to Camp Kappawanna, a family musical that premiered in New York on March 21, 2015, by the Atlantic Theater Company. Other collaborators on the score included Michelle Lewis and Dan Petty. The musical follows "the misadventures of Jennifer Jenkins, an awkward and adorable 12-year-old kid", and was inspired by Loeb's own memories of summer camp. The show received a positive write-up in The New York Times, with the review describing it as "fresh and funny" and praising the acoustic music and characterizations of the campers.

Her song "3, 2, 1, Let Go" was released in April 2015 as a single. Co-written and co-composed with Chris Unck, the song was also used in the April 2015 film Helicopter Mom. Loeb starred in the film as a high school English teacher. On November 20, 2015, Loeb released the single "Champagne (I'm Ready)" as a digital download through Amazon. Loeb described the New Year's track as "something you'd probably hear more in a dance club."

Loeb's third children's album, Nursery Rhyme Parade!, was made available exclusively through Amazon Music on October 16, 2015. The album includes 35 nursery rhymes and songs, including renditions of "The Muffin Man" and "The Farmer in the Dell". Beyond Loeb and her family as performers, guest artists included singer-songwriter Renee Stahl, while Rich Jacques produced. InStyle opined the album would "delight" both children and adults, describing it as having "stripped-down melodies and a strict adherence to traditional lyrics." Loeb's Nursery Rhyme Parade! won a 2016 NAPPA Award (National Parenting Product Awards). On December 16, 2016, Loeb released a long-form video of the over 30 songs from Nursery Rhyme Parade!

=== Feel What U Feel album, and soundtracks (2016) ===
In November 2016, Loeb released her fourth children's album entitled Feel What U Feel. She wrote and composed the selections on this album based on "what I'd like to pass along to my kids and kids in general." The title track, "Feel What U Feel", featured Craig Robinson of The Office, and it became the No. 1 song on SiriusXM's Kids Place Live, on which program it continued to be played as of the last days of August 2017. The parenting site, CoolMomPicks.com, chose "Feel What U Feel" as a 2016 Pick of the Year. On January 28, 2018, Loeb won the 2018 Grammy Award for 'Best Children's Album' for the album.

Loeb recorded the single "Christmas Cookie Song" for Amazon's holiday special If You Give a Mouse a Christmas Cookie, which premiered on November 25, 2016. She later wrote original songs for the If You Give A Mouse A Cookie Amazon series, including the theme song.

=== Lullaby Girl album, singles (2017–2019) ===
In October 2017, Loeb released the album Lullaby Girl featuring a world-class quartet led by keyboardist Larry Goldings. The album features Lisa and Larry's arrangements of classic songs like Dionne Warwick's "What the World Needs Now Is Love", the Five Stairsteps' "O-o-h Child", and Fleetwood Mac's "Don't Stop.", as well as two new original songs, including the title track. Lullaby Girl won a 2017 National Parenting Product Award.

In 2018, Loeb released a special version of the David Bowie song "All the Young Dudes" after performing her version of on a Howard Stern Show tribute to Bowie.

On May 29, 2019, Rolling Stone premiered Loeb's studio-recorded cover of the Bright Eyes song "First Day Of My Life." She previously performed the song at a friend's wedding a decade prior.

In July of the same year, Billboard premiered Loeb's new song "Love Never Dies", an original track she wrote to serve as the theme song to acclaimed author James Patterson's novel, Sophia, Princess Among Beasts, and inspired by the book.

=== A Simple Trick to Happiness album, Together Apart musical (2020–2021) ===
A Simple Trick to Happiness was released on February 28, 2020. The album is Loeb's most personal and reflects her interest in simple and direct songwriting paired with inspiration from her children and personal life. Loeb was inspired to write positive, uplifting music due to the complexity of modern life and after having written several albums of children's music. In October 2019, Loeb preceded the album's release with the premiere of her single "Sing Out" on the largest LGBTQ news site Queerty, in honor of National Coming Out Day. In December 2019, she premiered the music video for "Skeleton", the first official single from the album. The album received positive reviews. She has subsequently released music videos for many of the tracks on the album, including "This Is My Life", "Another Day", "Sing Out', "For the Birch", "Shine", "The Upside", "Doesn't It Feel Good", "Most of All", "I Wanna Go First" and "Wonder".

In March 2020, Loeb launched #StayAtHomeTogether, a series of live virtual concerts during the COVID-19 lockdown. She performed a special virtual show for hospital frontline workers through the organization Musicians on Call.

In August 2021, Loeb saw the premiere of Together Apart, a musical consisting of a collection of 10 seven-minute-long mini-musicals all about connecting on Zoom at the beginning of the COVID-19 pandemic. Loeb conceived and executive produced the musical, in which she also stars. Benefiting the Actors Fund, Together Apart was written, composed, directed-by and starring Loeb's fellow Brown University alumni, including Julie Bowen (Modern Family), Emmy Award Winner Josh Hamilton (13 Reasons Why), Ann Harada (Avenue Q) and JoBeth Williams (Kramer vs. Kramer). It was produced by Tony Award winner Beth Wishnie.

Together Apart evolved out of a Brown Musical Theatre class reunion on Zoom held during the pandemic. The reunion was attended by graduates from the early 80s through the late 90s. Loeb, a '90 Graduate, was energized by the digital reconnection and was inspired to find a solution to everyone's concern about how theater could exist during the pandemic. She began collaborating with her fellow graduates to create Together Apart. Together Apart was intentionally created using the Zoom platform as a reflection of life during the pandemic.

=== That's What It's All About album (2024) ===
On August 23, 2024, Loeb released the children's album That's What It's All About. The album was a collaboration with the band The Hollow Trees and includes both covers and original songs.

== Film and television appearances ==
In 1989, Loeb appeared in the low-budget comedy horror anthology film Tabloid, in a segment entitled "Killer Vacuum Destroys Town". The film was shot in and around Fort Worth, Texas.

Loeb shared title billing with then-boyfriend Dweezil Zappa on the reality show Dweezil & Lisa, which premiered on Food Network on January 16, 2004. The series showed the two musicians touring the country together and sampling unique and diverse dishes. In the opening for each episode, Loeb announced she was a vegetarian who enjoyed eating an occasional piece of bacon.

In the fall and winter of 2005, following her breakup with Zappa, Loeb taped a reality show called #1 Single, which premiered in January 2006 on the E! Channel in New York City. The show dealt with her quest for love, success, career, and family. A re-recording of Loeb's selection "Single Me Out" was used as the program's theme.

Loeb has made several guest appearances on television shows such as The Nanny in 1997, and Cupid the following year. In September 1999, she made an appearance on the comedy show MADtv, singing the theme song for a WB drama sketch called "Pretty White Kids with Problems". In 2007, Loeb appeared on an episode of Jack's Big Music Show singing the song "Jenny Jenkins". In 2008, she made a guest appearance on Gossip Girl, followed by a cameo on an episode of The Sarah Silverman Program in which the cast formed a mock band called "The Loeb Trotters". On the final episode of Gossip Girl on Monday, December 17, 2012, Lisa ended up with the character Rufus Humphrey in the five years after glimpse.

In addition to television shows, Loeb has also appeared in the horror films House on Haunted Hill (1999), Serial Killing 4 Dummys (1999), and Fright Night (2011). She has done voice work including the voice of Mary Jane Watson for the animated show Spider-Man: The New Animated Series, broadcast on MTV. Loeb also voiced the character of Lutina in the video game Grandia Xtreme and characters for The Rugrats Movie and Shorty McShorts' Shorts. As of 2012, Loeb provided the voice of Princess Winger on the Disney Junior animated series Jake and the Never Land Pirates.

In 2008, Loeb was one of the contributors to Carrie Borzillo-Vrenna's book Cherry Bomb; she gave advice on how to be the perfect hostess.

In 2010, Loeb provided guest voices for Disney's Special Agent Oso. In 2012, she provided voice over talent for BonTon industries in their spring TV spots. In December 2012, Loeb made a brief cameo as Matthew Settle's (Rufus Humphrey) love interest in "New York, I Love You XOXO", the final episode of Gossip Girl.

In February 2013, Loeb also made a cameo in an episode of Workaholics where her song "Stay (I Missed You)" is referenced several times. In January 2014, Loeb appeared on the cover of Making Music. In April 2014, Loeb appeared in the first episode of Last Week Tonight with John Oliver in a short musical sketch about Oregon's health care website failure.

In 2015, Loeb appeared as Julie, lead singer of the fictitious band "Natalie is Freezing", in the episode "Advanced Safety Features" of the TV series Community. She also appeared as herself in Hot Tub Time Machine 2. Other shows she has recently been involved in include Orange Is the New Black, About a Boy, King of the Nerds, Sunny Side Up Show, and Fuller House.

In 2021, Loeb appeared in a GEICO commercial campaign singing her hit "Stay" setup as an audition.

In 2024, Loeb made a guest star appearance in That 90s Show. Loeb played herself in a daydream that the main character, Leia, had of Loeb's music video, "Stay".

== Businesses ==
According to People: "Though Lisa Loeb rose to fame as a singer, she's probably just as well known for her eyeglasses." In November 2010, Loeb launched the Lisa Loeb Eyewear Collection. Each type of frame is named after one of her song titles, and while most models are for women, there are models for young girls and for men.

Loeb also sells a brand of coffee called her "Wake Up! Brew", a reference to her "Everybody Wake Up" song from her Camp Lisa album. The brand is organic and fair trade, with all profits going to Camp Lisa, and it is only available through the Coffee Fool website.

She constructed a crossword puzzle with Doug Peterson for The New York Times, which was published on June 6, 2017.

== Personal life ==
Loeb dated Dweezil Zappa from 1998 to 2004. She married Roey Hershkovitz in 2009; they met in 2006 during a business meeting for a food TV show. The couple have two children. Her cousin is New York City–based drag queen Alexis Michelle, who was a competitor on the ninth season of reality television series RuPaul's Drag Race.

In 2023, Loeb revealed on a podcast that she has misophonia.

== Awards and nominations ==
Award	Year	Nominee(s)	Category	Result	Ref.
She Rocks Awards	2019	Lisa Loeb	Inspire Award	Won	
Grammy Awards	2018	Feel What U Feel	Best Children's Album	Won	
American Camp Association	2015	Lisa Loeb	Camp Champions Award	Won	
BMI Pop Awards	1996	"Stay (I Missed You)"	Award-Winning Song	Won	
BMI Pop Awards	1999	"I Do"	Award-Winning Song	Won	
MTV Video Music Awards	1994	"Stay (I Missed You)"	Best New Artist in a Video	Nominated	
Brit Awards	1995	Lisa Loeb	International Breakthrough Act	Won	
Grammy Awards	1995	"Stay (I Missed You)"	Best Pop Performance by a Duo or Group with Vocals	Nominated	

== Discography ==
=== Studio albums ===
- 1990: Liz and Lisa – Days Were Different (with Elizabeth Mitchell)
- 1992: Purple Tape (re-released in 2008)
- 1995: Tails
- 1997: Firecracker
- 2002: Cake and Pie
- 2002: Hello Lisa (re-release of Cake and Pie)
- 2004: The Way It Really Is
- 2012: No Fairy Tale
- 2017: Lullaby Girl
- 2020: A Simple Trick to Happiness

=== Children's albums ===
- 2003: Catch the Moon (with Elizabeth Mitchell)
- 2008: Camp Lisa
- 2011: Lisa Loeb's Silly Sing-Along: The Disappointing Pancake and Other Zany Songs (songbook featuring a recording)
- 2013: Movin' and Shakin' (songbook featuring a recording)
- 2015: Nursery Rhyme Parade!
- 2016: Feel What U Feel
- 2024: That's What It's All About (with The Hollow Trees)

== Publishing history ==
=== Books ===
- 2011: Lisa Loeb's Silly Sing-Along: 'The Disappointing Pancake' and Other Zany Songs
- 2013: Lisa Loeb's Songs for Movin' and Shakin'

=== Plays ===
- 2021: Together Apart – co-wrote lyrics, co-composed music, stars in, and executive produced
- 2015: Camp Kappawanna – co-wrote lyrics and co-composed music

== Filmography ==
Selected roles and cameos by Lisa Loeb
Year	Title	Media	Publisher	Role
1999	Serial Killing 4 Dummys	Full-length film	Lionsgate Films	Support role
1999	House on Haunted Hill	Full-length film	Warner Brothers Films	Channel 3 Reporter
1999	MADtv	Comedy TV series	WB	Cameo in episode
2002-2004	Teamo Supremo	Children's TV series	ABC	Voice of Tiffany Javelins/Songstress/Sally Smith
2003	Spider-Man: The New Animated Series	Children's TV series	MTV	Voice of Mary Jane Watson
2004	Dweezil & Lisa	Reality TV series	Food Network	Primary character as herself, all episodes
2006	#1 Single	Reality TV series	E!	Primary character as herself, all episodes
2008	Gossip Girl	TV series	Drama	Herself
2011	Fright Night	Full-length film	Touchstone Pictures	Victoria Lee
2012	Jake and the Never Land Pirates	Children's TV series	Disney Junior	Voice of Princess Winger
2012	Gossip Girl	TV series	Drama	Herself
2014	Helicopter Mom	Full-length film	American Film Productions	Role as high school teacher
2015	Hot Tub Time Machine 2	Full-length film	Paramount Pictures	Herself
2015	Hell's Kitchen	Reality TV series	Fox	Chef's table guest in Meghan Gill's kitchen
2015	Community	Comedy TV series	Yahoo! Studios	Julie, lead singer of Natalie is Freezing
2018	A.P. Bio	Comedy TV series	NBC	Herself
2019–2020	Fuller House	Comedy TV series	Netflix	Herself
2021	Robot Chicken	Comedy TV series	Adult Swim	Voice of General Leia Organa/Lice Singer
2022	Hanukkah on Rye	Full-length film	Hallmark Channel	Support role
2023	Firebuds	Children's TV series	Disney Junior	Voice of Laura
2024	That 90s Show	Comedy TV series	Netflix	Herself
