= Cake and Pie =

Studio album by Lisa Loeb
- Released: February 26, 2002
- Recorded: 1999–2001
- Genre: Pop rock
- Length: 42:32
- Label: A&M
- Producers: Ron Fair (exec.); Lisa Loeb; Peter Collins; Dweezil Zappa; Randy Scruggs

Lisa Loeb chronology
Firecracker (1997)	Cake and Pie (2002)	Hello Lisa (2002)

Professional ratings
Review scores
Source	Rating
AllMusic	3/5 stars
Rolling Stone	(favorable)
Rolling Stone Album Guide	3/5 stars

Cake and Pie is the third solo studio album by American singer-songwriter Lisa Loeb. It was released in 2002 through A&M Records.

== Promotion ==
The first single "The Way It Really Is" was a moderate hit among college radio. "We Could Still Belong Together" was also included on the soundtrack to Legally Blonde. The album's single "Someone You Should Know" was released in November 2001, and the song became a hit in Japan. In the US, it received moderate airplay on Triple A, Adult Top 40 and Pop radio formats, though never officially charted.

The music video for "Someone You Should Know" was played heavily on VH1 upon its release in early 2002. "Underdog" peaked at No. 39 on Billboard's Adult Top 40 chart in the fall of 2002.

== Release and reception ==
The album was released on A&M, at that time the sister label of Geffen Records, which had released Loeb's previous two records (Tails and Firecracker). Loeb was moved to A&M after Geffen became part of Universal Music Group in 1999. The singer began working on Cake and Pie in 1999. It was originally scheduled to debut in 2000, but the album wasn't released until 2002.

Cake and Pie did not receive any major backing or promotion from Loeb's record label which led to the album's commercial failure. A&M and Loeb clashed over the music video concept for "Underdog", so the record label did not fund the shooting of the video. Loeb subsequently negotiated a release from A&M and joined Artemis Records.

Loeb bought the rights to the masters of the songs, and the album was reissued and renamed Hello Lisa. The songs "We Could Still Belong Together", "She's Falling Apart", and "Too Fast Driving" were cut from Hello Lisa and replaced with "Did That", "What Am I Supposed to Say" and "Take Me Back".

== Track listing ==
No.	Title	Writer(s)	Length
1.	"The Way It Really Is"	Glen Ballard; Lisa Loeb; Lindy Robbins	3:58
2.	"Bring Me Up"	Loeb	3:29
3.	"Underdog"	Loeb; Dweezil Zappa	3:01
4.	"Everyday"	Loeb; Randy Scruggs	4:01
5.	"Someone You Should Know"	Dave Bassett; Loeb	3:22
6.	"Drops Me Down"	Loeb	3:00
7.	"We Could Still Be Together"	Sean Kelly; Loeb; Solomon Sheppard	3:00
8.	"Kick Start"	Gary Burr; Loeb	2:47
9.	"You Don't Know Me"	Loeb; Zappa	3:50
10.	"Payback"	Loeb	4:42
11.	"Too Fast Driving"	Loeb	3:08
12.	"She's Falling Apart"	Derek Holt; Loeb; Thom Schuyler	4:14
Total length:			42:32

Japanese release bonus track
No.	Title	Writer(s)	Length
13.	"Look Me in the Eye"	Loeb	2:49

== Charts ==
Chart (2002)	Peak position
Australian Albums (ARIA)	315
US Billboard 200	199
