= Catch the Moon =

Studio album by Lisa Loeb and Elizabeth Mitchell
- Released: 2003
- Genre: Children's music
- Length: 31:36
- Label: Artemis
- Producer: Elizabeth Mitchell

Lisa Loeb chronology
Hello Lisa (2002)	Catch the Moon (2003)	The Way It Really Is (2004)

Elizabeth Mitchell chronology
You Are My Sunshine (2002)	Catch the Moon (2003)	You Are My Little Bird (2006)

Professional ratings
Review scores
Source	Rating
AllMusic	4/5 stars

Catch the Moon is the second studio album by Liz and Lisa, a musical duo consisting of Lisa Loeb and Elizabeth Mitchell, released in 2003 by Artemis Records. The album presents a collection of folk songs for children. It comes in the form of a child's cardboard storybook written by Erin Courtney and illustrated by Bonnie Brook Mitchell. The CD slides out the top of the back cover.

== Track listing ==
1. "The Big Rock Candy Mountain" – 2:45
2. "Little Red Caboose" – 2:22
3. "Oh Susanna" – 2:20
4. "Catch the Moon" – 3:10
5. "La Manita" – 1:37
6. "Twinkle Twinkle Little Star" – 2:14
7. "Stop and Go" – 2:29
8. "New Morning" – 3:46
9. "Oh Groundhog" – 2:43
10. "Butterfly (Mariposa)" – 2:32
11. "Donguri/Rolling Acorn" – 1:51
12. "Free Little Bird" – 2:11
13. "Fais Do Do" – 1:36

== Personnel ==
- Lisa Loeb - Lead and backing vocals, Guitar, Banjo
- Elizabeth Mitchell - Lead and backing vocals, Tambourine, Fiddle, Wurlitzer electric piano
- Dan Littleton - Backup vocals, Guitar, Slide guitar, Bass, Harmonica, Piano, Organ, Wurlitzer electric piano, Bells & percussion
- Alexandre Sousa - Backup vocals
- Storey - Backup vocals

== Production team ==
- Executive Producer: Michael Krumper
- Produced by Lisa Loeb, Elizabeth Mitchell
- Music composed by Warren Defever, Bob Dylan, Stephen Foster, Dan Littleton, Lisa Loeb, Elizabeth Mitchell
- Audio Engineers: Warren Defever, Lisa Loeb, Phillip Loeb, Elizabeth Mitchell
- Soundtrack Mastered by Steve Fallone

== Music videos ==
Two music videos for the album were made for the songs "Catch the Moon" and "Stop & Go". Both of these were broadcast on Nickelodeon's Noggin and Nick Jr. channels in 2003.
